= 2021–22 Lebanese FA Cup =

Tournament details
- Country: Lebanon
- Dates: 16 December 2021 – 11 June 2022
- Teams: 16

Final positions
- Champions: Nejmeh
- Runners-up: Ansar

Tournament statistics
- Matches played: 15
- Goals scored: 36 (2.4 per match)
- Top goal scorer(s): Hassan Maatouk (3 goals)

The 2021–22 Lebanese FA Cup was the 49th edition of the national football cup competition of Lebanon. It started with the round of 16 on 16 December 2021, and ended on 11 June 2022 with the final.

Lebanese Premier League side Ansar were the defending champions, having won the 2020–21 edition. They lost to cross-city rivals Nejmeh 2–1 in the final.

== Teams ==
Round	Dates	Number of fixtures	Clubs remaining	New entries this round	Divisions entering this round
Round of 16	16–18 December 2021	8	16 → 8	16	12 Lebanese Premier League teams 4 Lebanese Second Division teams
Quarter-finals	21–22 December 2021	4	8 → 4	None	none
Semi-finals	26–27 February 2022	2	4 → 2	None	none
Final	11 June 2021	1	2 → 1	None	none

== Round of 16 ==
16 December 2021	Racing Beirut (2)	1–0	Tripoli (1)	Jounieh
12:30 UTC+3	Sabra 63'	Report		Stadium: Fouad Chehab Stadium; Referee: Kazem El Khansa

16 December 2021	Sagesse (1)	0–0 (5–3 p)	Shabab Sahel (1)	Bhamdoun
12:30 UTC+3		Report		Stadium: Amin Abdelnour Stadium; Referee: Ali Al Ashkar

16 December 2021	Shabab Bourj (1)	1–0	Safa (1)	Beirut
12:30 UTC+3	Awada 71'	Report		Stadium: Al Ahed Stadium; Referee: Hussein Abo Yehia

17 December 2021	Tadamon Sour (1)	2–2 (6–7 p)	Nejmeh (1)	Bhamdoun
12:30 UTC+3	Honeine 7'; Mazbouh 40'	Report	Siblini 18'; Takaji 26'	Stadium: Amin Abdelnour Stadium; Referee: Samer Kassem

17 December 2021	Akhaa Ahli Aley (1)	0–3	Ahed (1)	Jounieh
12:30 UTC+3		Report	El-Helwe 45' (pen.), 56' (pen.); Monzer 69'	Stadium: Fouad Chehab Stadium; Referee: Mohamad Issa

17 December 2021	Salam Zgharta (2)	1–1 (9–8 p)	Sporting (1)	Beirut
12:30 UTC+3	Abdelwahhab 85'	Report	Hamdar 62'	Stadium: Al Ahed Stadium; Referee: Ali Reda

18 December 2021	Nabi Chit (2)	2–2 (3–4 p)	Bourj (1)	Bhamdoun
12:30 UTC+3	El Moussawi 27' (pen.); Chouman 71'	Report	Matar 47' (o.g.); Bitar 90+4'	Stadium: Amin Abdelnour Stadium; Referee: Maher Al Ali

18 December 2021	Chabab Ghazieh (2)	0–3	Ansar (1)	Jounieh
12:30 UTC+3		Report	Osman 27'; El Dor 33'; Bou Saleh 90+1'	Stadium: Fouad Chehab Stadium; Referee: Mohamad Haddad

== Quarter-finals ==
21 December 2021	Shabab Bourj (1)	1–2	Sagesse (1)	Beirut
12:30 UTC+3	El Housseini 86'	Report	Hammoud 64'; Al Azzi 82'	Stadium: Al Ahed Stadium; Referee: Samer Kassem

21 December 2021	Ahed (1)	1–1 (2–4 p)	Nejmeh (1)	Jounieh
15:45 UTC+3	Nasser 56'	Report	Sabra 33'	Stadium: Fouad Chehab Stadium; Referee: Mohamad Issa
	Penalties
	Kdouh (penalty missed); Dakik (penalty missed); Haidar (penalty scored); El-Helwe (penalty scored)		(penalty scored) Al Saadi; (penalty missed) El Zein; (penalty scored) Chehade; (penalty scored) Annan; (penalty scored) Siblini

22 December 2021	Salam Zgharta (2)	0–6	Ansar (1)	Jounieh
12:30 UTC+3		Report	Maatouk 18', 34', 80' (pen.); Ali 48'; Nassar 83'; Hijazi 86'	Stadium: Fouad Chehab Stadium; Referee: Ali Reda

22 December 2021	Bourj (1)	3–0	Racing Beirut (2)	Beirut
12:30 UTC+3	Mehanna 2'; Markabawi 86' (pen.), 88'	Report		Stadium: Al Ahed Stadium; Referee: Hadi Salame

== Semi-finals ==
26 February 2022	Nejmeh (1)	1–0	Sagesse (1)	Jounieh
15:45 UTC+3	Siblini 85'	Report		Stadium: Fouad Chehab Stadium; Referee: Ali Reda

27 February 2022	Ansar (1)	0–0 (3–2 p)	Bourj (1)	Jounieh
15:45 UTC+3		Report		Stadium: Fouad Chehab Stadium; Referee: Mohamad Issa
	Penalties
	Ayoub (penalty missed); Osman (penalty scored); Maatouk (penalty scored); El Dor (penalty scored)		(penalty scored) Qasem; (penalty missed) Moghrabi; (penalty missed) Al-Mel; (penalty scored) Damej; (penalty missed) Atriss

== Final ==
11 June 2022
15:30 UTC+3

Ansar (1)	1–2	Nejmeh (1)
Diarra 61'	Report	Alaaeddine 38'; Ghaddar 84'

Fouad Chehab Stadium, Jounieh
Referee: Abdulhadi Al Asmar Al Ruaile (Qatar)

== Bracket ==
The following is the bracket which the Lebanese FA Cup resembled. Numbers in parentheses next to the score represents the results of a penalty shoot-out.

Round of 16; 16–18 December 2021
Salam Zgharta	1 (9)
Sporting	1 (8)
Chabab Ghazieh	0
Ansar	3
Nabi Chit	2 (3)
Bourj	2 (4)
Racing Beirut	1
Tripoli	0
Akhaa Ahli Aley	0
Ahed	3
Tadamon Sour	2 (6)
Nejmeh	2 (7)
Shabab Bourj	1
Safa	0
Sagesse	0 (5)
Shabab Sahel	0 (3)

Quarter-finals; 21–22 December 2021
Salam Zgharta	0
Ansar	6
Bourj	3
Racing Beirut	0
Ahed	1 (2)
Nejmeh	1 (4)
Shabab Bourj	1
Sagesse	2

Semi-finals; 26–27 February 2022
Ansar	0 (3)
Bourj	0 (2)
Nejmeh	1
Sagesse	0

Final; 11 June 2022
Ansar	1
Nejmeh	2

== Season statistics ==
=== Top scorers ===
Rank	Player	Club	Goals
1	(Lebanon) Hassan Maatouk	Ansar	3
2	(Lebanon) Hilal El-Helwe	Ahed	2
2	(Lebanon) Mahmoud Siblini	Nejmeh	2
2	(Lebanon) Ali Markabawi	Bourj	2
