= Hussein Awada (footballer, born 1990) =

Lebanese footballer

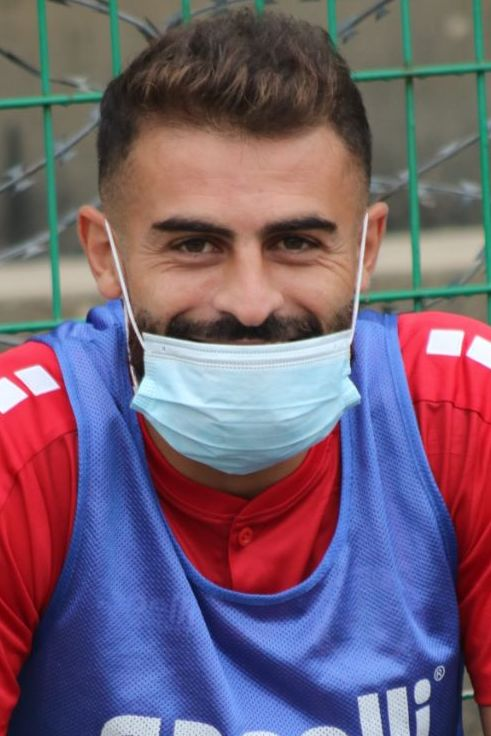
- Awada with Nejmeh in 2020

Personal information
- Full name: Hussein Melhem Awada
- Date of birth: 22 March 1990 (age 36)
- Place of birth: Baalbek, Lebanon
- Height: 1.77 m (5 ft 10 in)
- Position: Forward

Senior career*
Years	Team	Apps	(Gls)
2006–2007	Nahda Barelias		
2007–2011	Mabarra		
2011–2012	Salam Sour	19	(5)
2012–2016	Ahed	65	(11)
2016–2017	Safa	18	(4)
2017–2018	Shabab Arabi	14	(1)
2018–2020	Ansar	14	(0)
2020–2021	Nejmeh	7	(3)
2021–2022	Sagesse	13	(0)
2022	Nejmeh	2	(0)
2023–2024	Ansar	1	(0)
Total		153	(24)

International career
2008	Lebanon U19	2	(0)
2011	Lebanon U23	1	(0)
2013–2016	Lebanon	20	(1)
- * Club domestic league appearances and goals as of 13:09, 6 January 2024 (UTC)

Hussein Melhem Awada (Arabic: حسين ملحم عواضة; born 22 March 1990) is a Lebanese former footballer who played as a forward.

Awada began his career at Nahda Barelias, before moving to Mabarra in 2007. Four seasons later, in 2011, Awada moved to Salam Sour, before joining Ahed in 2012, with whom he won a league title in 2014–15. In 2016 Awada joined Safa, before joining Shabab Arabi after one season. He moved to Ansar in 2018, then to rivals Nejmeh two years later, and then moved to Sagesse in summer 2021. Awada returned to Nejmeh (2022) and Ansar (2023–2024), where he finished his career.

Between 2013 and 2016, Awada represented Lebanon internationally; he played 20 games, scoring one goal.

== Club career ==
Awada began his senior career at Nahda Barelias, before moving to Lebanese Premier League club Mabarra during the 2007–08 season. Following four seasons at the club, Awada moved to Salam Sour in 2011. He scored five league goals in 19 games during the 2011–12 season. In 2012 Awada joined Ahed; in his first season at the club (2012–13), he scored six goals in 19 league games. In 2013 Awada won his first major trophy, helping Ahed win the 2013 Lebanese Elite Cup. During his four-season stay at Ahed, Awada would lift a league title (2014–15), another Elite Cup (2015), and a Super Cup (2015).

On 11 August 2016, defending champions Safa acquired Awada from Ahed. The forward remained at Safa for one season, scoring four goals in 18 games. On 29 August 2017, Awada moved to Shabab Arabi; he scored 1 goal in 14 matches during the 2017–18 season. On 11 September 2018, Awada moved to Ansar.

On 29 September 2020, Awada joined cross-city rivals Nejmeh. He moved to Sagesse on 8 September 2021, and terminated his contract on mutual terms in December 2022.

On 29 December 2023, Awada returned to Ansar ahead of the second leg of the 2023–24 season.

== International career ==
Awada made his international debut for Lebanon on 29 May 2013, in a friendly against Oman; the match ended in a 1–1 draw. Awada's first international goal came on 19 February 2014, in a friendly against Pakistan. The Lebanese forward helped his side win 3–1.

== Career statistics ==
=== International ===
Scores and results list Lebanon's goal tally first, score column indicates score after each Awada goal.

List of international goals scored by Hussein Awada
No.	Date	Venue	Opponent	Score	Result	Competition	Ref.
1	19 February 2014	Camille Chamoun Sports City Stadium, Beirut, Lebanon	Pakistan	2–0	3–1	Friendly	

== Honours ==
Ahed

- Lebanese Premier League: 2014–15
- Lebanese Elite Cup: 2013, 2015
- Lebanese Super Cup: 2015
- Lebanese FA Cup runner-up: 2020–21

Nejmeh

- Lebanese Elite Cup: 2021
- Lebanese Super Cup runner-up: 2021

Ansar

- Lebanese FA Cup: 2023–24

Individual

- Lebanese Premier League Best Goal: 2011–12
