= Hassan Chaito =

Lebanese footballer (born 1989)

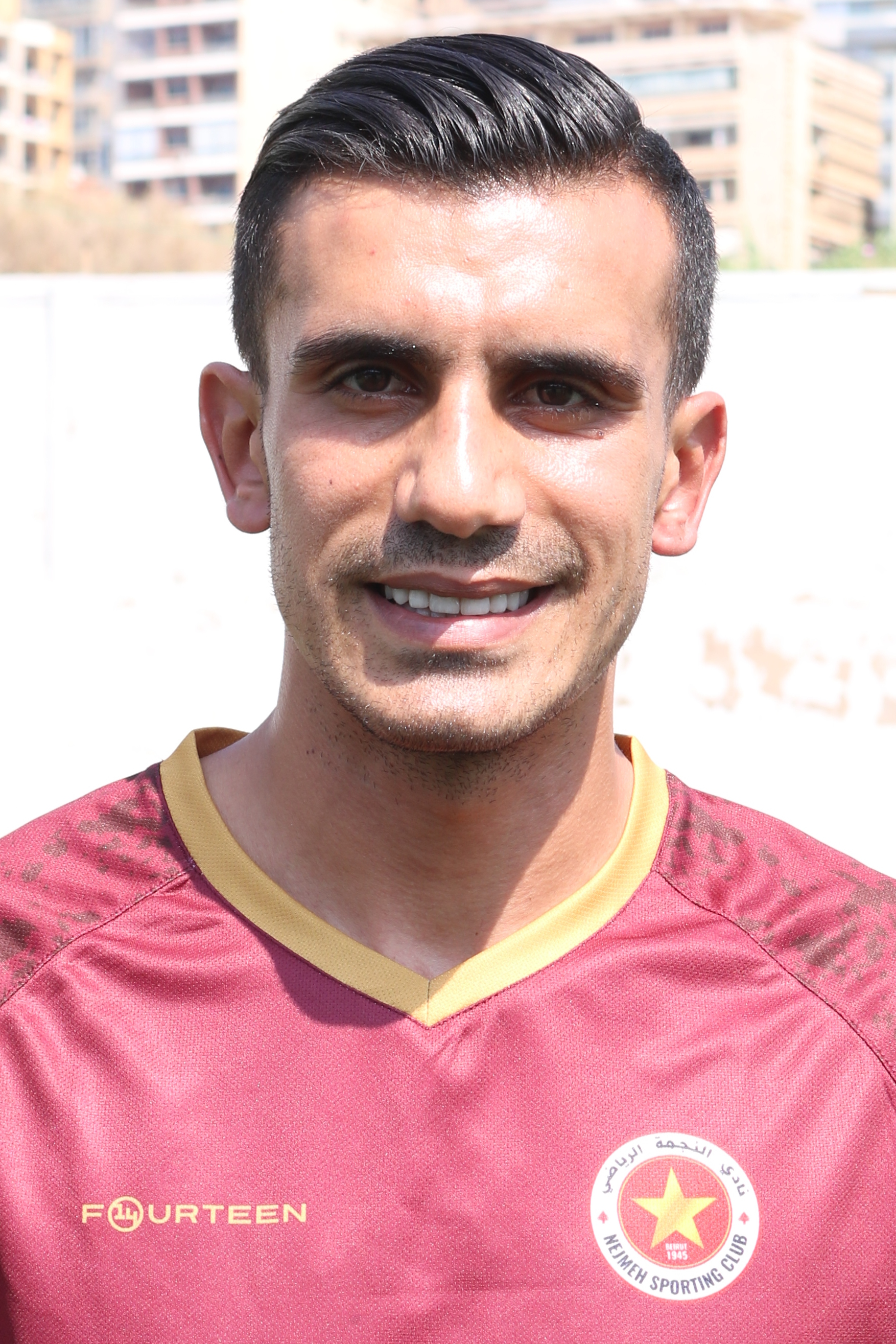
- Chaito with Nejmeh in 2021

Personal information
- Full name: Hassan Ali Chaito
- Date of birth: 20 March 1989 (age 37)
- Place of birth: At Tiri, Lebanon
- Height: 1.82 m (6 ft 0 in)
- Position: Attacking midfielder

Team information
- Current team: Rissala Toura
- Number: 7

Senior career*
| Years | Team | Apps | (Gls) |
| 2008–2009 | Jihad Hay Sellom | | |
| 2009–2013 | Ahed | 63 | (24) |
| 2009–2010 | Lebanese Canadian Bank (futsal) | | |
| 2010–2013 | Sadaka (futsal) | | |
| 2013–2014 | Ansar | 1 | (0) |
| 2014 | Al-Shabab | 14 | (5) |
| 2014–2015 | Terengganu | 0 | (0) |
| 2015–2018 | Ahed | 58 | (22) |
| 2018–2021 | Ansar | 40 | (13) |
| 2021–2023 | Nejmeh | 9 | (0) |
| 2023–2025 | Bourj | 27 | (3) |
| 2025–2026 | Mabarra | 21 | (1) |
| 2026– | Rissala Toura | 6 | (0) |

International career^{‡}
| 2010 | Lebanon (futsal) | | (2) |
| 2011 | Lebanon U23 | 2 | (0) |
| 2011–2021 | Lebanon | 63 | (6) |
- * Club domestic league appearances and goals as of 01:40, 17 November 2026 (UTC) ‡ National team caps and goals as of 13:35, 7 September 2021 (UTC)

Hassan Ali Chaito (Arabic: حسن علي شعيتو, Lebanese Arabic pronunciation: [ˈħasan ˈʕali ˈʃʕajto, -tu]; born 20 March 1989), also known as Moni (Arabic: موني, [ˈmoːni]), is a Lebanese professional footballer and former futsal player who plays as an attacking midfielder for Lebanese Second Division club Rissala Toura.

Chaito began his career in the Lebanese Third Division at Jihad Hay Sellom, before moving to the Lebanese Premier League at Ahed in 2009. Simultaneously he began his futsal career, first playing at the Lebanese Canadian Bank, then at Sadaka from 2010 to 2014, before going back to playing football. He joined Ansar, before moving to Bahrain the following year at Al-Shabab. Chaito moved to Malaysian side Terengganu, before returning to Ahed in 2015. In 2018. Chaito joined Ansar, and later switched to cross-city rivals Nejmeh in 2021. He then played for Bourj, Mabarra, and Rissala Toura.

Starting his international career with Lebanon in 2011, Chaito participated in the 2014, 2018, and 2022 FIFA World Cup qualifiers, and the 2015, 2019, and 2023 AFC Asian Cup qualifiers. Chaito also helped Lebanon qualify to the 2019 AFC Asian Cup, their first participation through qualification.

== Club career ==
Chaito started his football career at Jihad Hay Sellom in the Lebanese Third Division before moving to Lebanese Premier League side Ahed in 2009, winning two league titles and two FA Cups in his four-year stay.

In 2009 Chaito had begun his career in futsal, first playing for the Lebanese Canadian Bank, and then moving to Sadaka in 2010. He won the Lebanon Futsal League twice, in 2011 and 2013, and played in the 2011 and 2013 editions of the AFC Futsal Club Championship for the Lebanese side, scoring seven goals in total during the two tournaments.

Chaito joined Ansar in 2013, before moving abroad to Bahrain the following year to Al-Shabab. In 2014 he moved to Malaysia at Terengganu, before moving back to Ahed in 2015. Chaito helped his side win three more league titles and one FA Cup, finishing as the league's second top goalscorer during the 2017–18 season.

On 17 August 2018, Chaito returned to Ansar. On 23 October 2020, it was announced that Chaito had refused an offer from Iraqi club Al-Talaba. In 2020–21, he helped Ansar win their first league title since 2007, and their 14th overall. Chaito also helped Ansar win the double, beating Nejmeh in the 2020–21 Lebanese FA Cup final on penalty shoot-outs.

Chaito moved to cross-city rivals Nejmeh on 21 June 2021. On 12 September, during a league game against Tripoli, Chaito sustained an ACL injury which kept him on the sidelines for six months.

On 21 June 2023, Bourj announced the signing of Chaito. On 5 August 2025, he signed for Mabarra. On 31 August 2026, Chaito joined Lebanese Second Division side Rissala Toura.

== International career ==
Chaito represented Lebanon in the 2010 AFC Futsal Championship, before being called up for the under-23 football team for the 2012 Olympics Qualifiers in 2011.

Chaito's senior football international debut came on 15 November 2011, in a 2–1 home win against South Korea. On 22 March 2013, Chaito scored his first two goals in the 2015 AFC Asian Cup qualifiers against Thailand, with the match ending 5–2 to Lebanon. His second brace came against Laos on 12 November 2015 in the 2018 World Cup qualifiers, with the match ending 7–0 to Lebanon. In December 2018, Chaito was called up for the 2019 AFC Asian Cup, playing in the final group stage game against North Korea, with Lebanon winning 4–1.

== Style of play ==
A versatile player, Chaito mainly plays as an attacking midfielder, but can also play as a left midfielder and in a false nine role. His main attribute is his finishing.

== Personal life ==
Chaito's nickname "Moni" comes from his sister who, as a kid, mispronounced his name "Hassan" as "Moni". Indeed, in Chaito's first game broadcast on TV, the commentator Mahmoud Tarhini – who was aware of Chaito's nickname – called him "Moni" throughout the match.

== Career statistics ==
=== International ===
As of match played 7 September 2021

Appearances and goals by national team and year
| National team | Year | Apps | Goals |
|---|---|---|---|
| Lebanon | 2011 | 2 | 0 |
| Lebanon | 2012 | 16 | 0 |
| Lebanon | 2013 | 13 | 3 |
| Lebanon | 2014 | 0 | 0 |
| Lebanon | 2015 | 9 | 2 |
| Lebanon | 2016 | 5 | 0 |
| Lebanon | 2017 | 0 | 0 |
| Lebanon | 2018 | 7 | 0 |
| Lebanon | 2019 | 7 | 1 |
| Lebanon | 2020 | 1 | 0 |
| Lebanon | 2021 | 3 | 0 |
| Total | | 63 | 6 |

Scores and results list Lebanon's goal tally first, score column indicates score after each Chaito goal.

List of international goals scored by Hassan Chaito
| No. | Date | Venue | Opponent | Score | Result | Competition |
|---|---|---|---|---|---|---|
| 1 | 22 March 2013 | Camille Chamoun Sports City Stadium, Beirut, Lebanon | Thailand | 1–0 | 5–2 | 2015 AFC Asian Cup qualification |
| 2 | 22 March 2013 | Camille Chamoun Sports City Stadium, Beirut, Lebanon | Thailand | 2–0 | 5–2 | 2015 AFC Asian Cup qualification |
| 3 | 8 October 2013 | Camille Chamoun Sports City Stadium, Beirut, Lebanon | Iraq | 1–0 | 1–1 | Friendly |
| 4 | 12 November 2015 | Saida Municipal Stadium, Sidon, Lebanon | Laos | 3–0 | 7–0 | 2018 FIFA World Cup qualification |
| 5 | 12 November 2015 | Saida Municipal Stadium, Sidon, Lebanon | Laos | 7–0 | 7–0 | 2018 FIFA World Cup qualification |
| 6 | 2 August 2019 | Karbala Sports City, Karbala, Iraq | Syria | 2–1 | 2–1 | 2019 WAFF Championship |

== Honours ==
Sadaka (Note: Futsal)

- Lebanon Futsal League: 2010–11, 2012–13

Ahed

- Lebanese Premier League: 2009–10, 2010–11, 2016–17, 2017–18
- Lebanese FA Cup: 2010–11, 2017–18
- Lebanese Elite Cup: 2010, 2011, 2015
- Lebanese Super Cup: 2010, 2011, 2015, 2017, 2018

Ansar

- Lebanese Premier League: 2020–21
- Lebanese FA Cup: 2020–21; runner-up: 2018–19
- Lebanese Elite Cup runner-up: 2019
- Lebanese Super Cup runner-up: 2019

Nejmeh

- Lebanese FA Cup: 2021–22, 2022–23
- Lebanese Elite Cup: 2021
- Lebanese Super Cup runner-up: 2021

Individual

- Lebanese Premier League Team of the Season: 2012–13, 2013–14

== See also ==
- List of Lebanon international footballers
