= Nader Matar =

Association football player (born 1992)

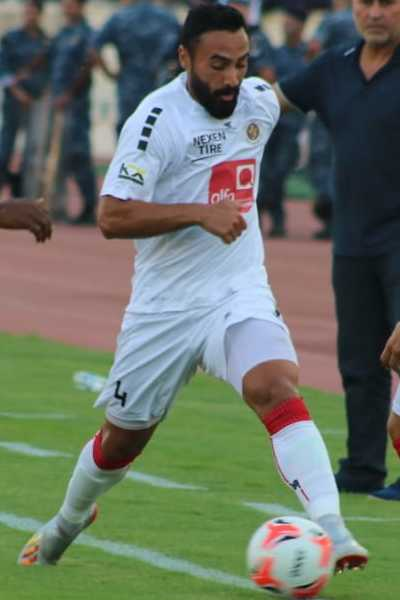
- Matar with Nejmeh in 2019

Personal information
- Full name: Nader Charbel Matar
- Date of birth: 12 May 1992 (age 34)
- Place of birth: Abidjan, Ivory Coast
- Height: 1.75 m (5 ft 9 in)
- Position: Midfielder

Team information
- Current team: Ansar
- Number: 4

Youth career
- Alcorcón

Senior career*
Years	Team	Apps	(Gls)
2008–2009	Sporting CP B		
2009–2010	Oeiras		
2010–2011	Atlético Madrid C		
2011–2012	Canillas		
2012–2014	Asante Kotoko		
2014	Beira-Mar	3	(0)
2016–2020	Nejmeh	60	(8)
2020–2021	Ansar	14	(2)
2021–2022	Muaither	6	(0)
2022–	Ansar	64	(14)

International career^{‡}
2012–2024	Lebanon	71	(4)
- * Club domestic league appearances and goals as of 19 July 2025 ‡ National team caps and goals as of 11 June 2024

Nader Charbel Matar (Arabic: نادر شربل مطر, Lebanese Arabic pronunciation: [ˈneːdir ˈʃarbil ˈmɑtˤɑr, ˈnæː-]; born 12 May 1992) is a professional footballer who plays as a midfielder for Lebanese Premier League club Ansar. Born in the Ivory Coast, Matar has played for the Lebanon national team.

Matar began his senior career in 2008 in Portugal, playing for Sporting CP B and Oeiras. He moved to Spain in 2010, where he played for Atlético Madrid C and Canillas, before moving to Ghana-based Asante Kotoko in 2012. He returning to Portugal in 2014, playing six months at Beira-Mar. Matar signed for his first Lebanese club in 2016, Nejmeh, where he won three Lebanese Elite Cups and one Lebanese Super Cup in his four-year stay. In 2020, Matar moved to cross-city rivals Ansar, helping them win their first league title in 14 years in his first season. He then moved back abroad, joining Qatar-based Muaither, before returning to Ansar in 2022.

Matar made his debut for Lebanon in a friendly against Iraq in 2012, and also played in the 2014 FIFA World Cup qualifiers. Matar helped Lebanon qualify to the 2019 AFC Asian Cup, where he played. His first goal came at the 2019 WAFF Championship, against Syria.

== Early life ==
Matar was born in Abidjan, Ivory Coast, to a Lebanese father and Moroccan mother. He grew up in Angola, and played for several local clubs.

== Club career ==
=== Early career ===
After playing at youth level for Alcorcón in Spain, in 2008 Matar moved to Portugal, playing one year for Sporting CP B, and one year for Oeiras. He returned to Spain in 2010, joining Atlético Madrid C, before moving to Canillas, Real Madrid's de facto C team.

Matar signed for Ghana Premier League side Asante Kotoko in 2012. In 2014 he returned to Portugal, at Beira-Mar in the Liga Portugal 2, where he was released after six months.

=== Nejmeh ===
On 2 September 2016, Matar moved to Lebanon and signed for Nejmeh. He scored one goal in 17 league games in 2016–17, helping his team win the Lebanese Super Cup and Lebanese Elite Cup. He was included in the Lebanese Premier League Team of the Year. In 2017–18 Matar improved his tally, scoring four in 19, winning the Lebanese Elite Cup once again. He renewed his contract for an additional season on 28 March 2018.

The following season, in 2018–19, Matar scored three goals in 20 games, and helped Nejmeh win the Lebanese Elite Cup for the third time in a row. He renewed his contract for three more years on 21 March 2019. On 25 October 2019, Matar was warned and fined by Nejmeh for throwing his kit on the floor following a substitution against Racing Beirut in a friendly. On 20 January 2020, Matar's contract was terminated by mutual consent following financial disputes between the two parties.

=== Ansar ===
Matar joined cross-city rivals Ansar on 21 September 2020. In 2020–21, he helped them win their first league title since 2007, and their 14th overall. Matar scored two goals and made three assists in 14 games. He also helped Ansar win the double, scoring a long-distance goal against Nejmeh in the 2020–21 Lebanese FA Cup final, which Ansar won on penalty shoot-outs.

=== Muaither ===
On 16 August 2021, Matar moved to Qatari Second Division side Muaither on a free transfer. He made his debut on 15 September, in a 1–0 defeat to Lusalil.

=== Return to Ansar ===
On 17 January 2022, Matar returned to Ansar in the Lebanese Premier League, signing a contract until the end of the 2021–22 season. He renewed his contract for two years until the end of the 2023–24 season, and once more for two years until end of 2025–26 season.

== International career ==
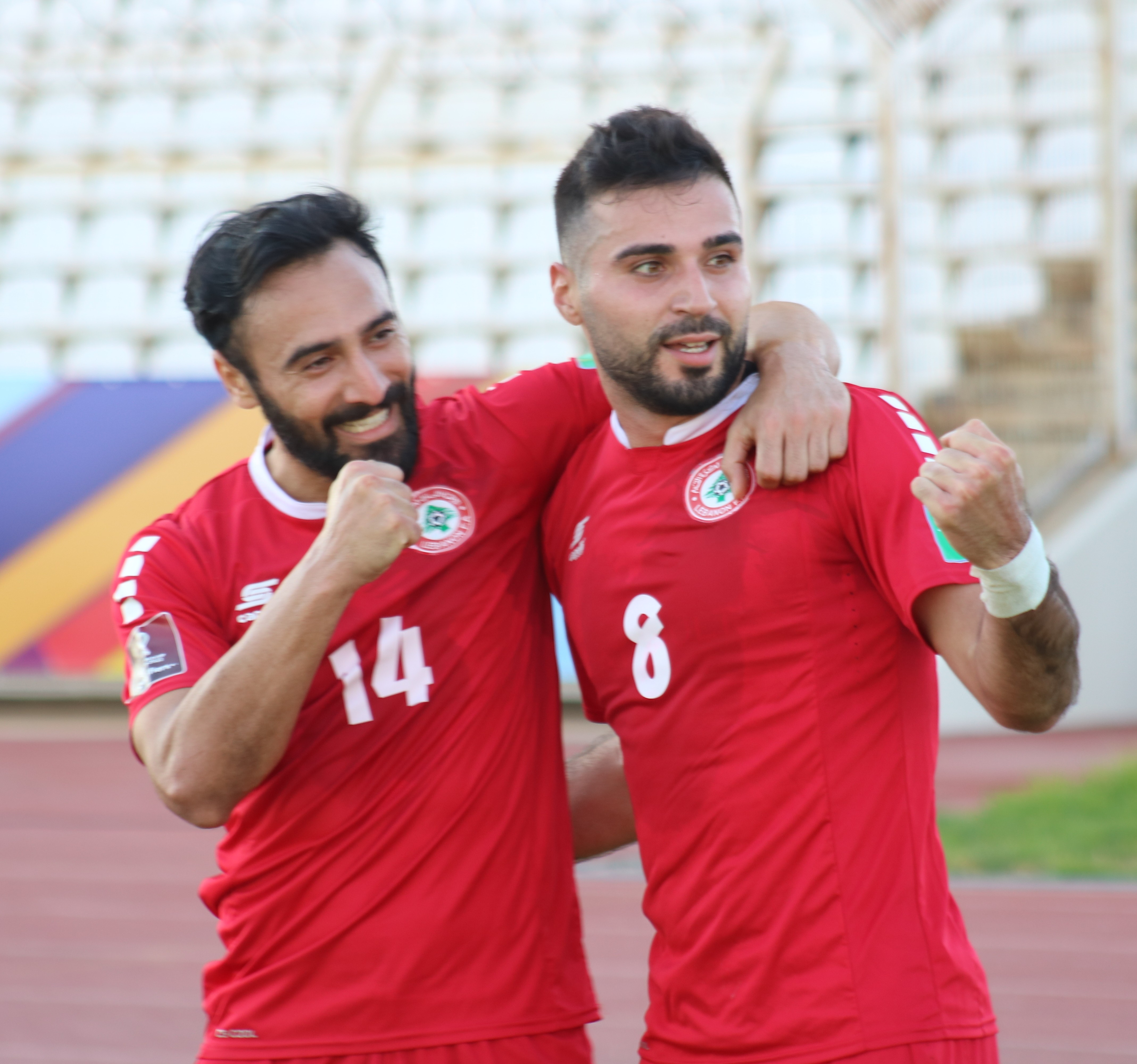
Matar (left) celebrating teammate Soony Saad's (right) goal for Lebanon against Iran in 2021

Matar made his debut for Lebanon in a 1–0 home win against Iraq in a friendly on 22 January 2012. He was called up for the 2019 AFC Asian Cup squad, playing in all three group stage games. Matar's first international goal came on 2 August 2019, in a 2–1 win against Syria at the 2019 WAFF Championship.

== Style of play ==
An attacking-minded midfielder, Matar's main characteristics are his dribbling and flair; he is also a set-piece specialist. Starting out as an attacking midfielder, Matar developed into a more central role during his stay at Nejmeh.

== Personal life ==
On 9 January 2021, Matar and his Moroccan wife got married in Casablanca, Morocco.

== Career statistics ==
=== International ===
As of match played 11 June 2024

Appearances and goals by national team and year
National team	Year	Apps	Goals
Lebanon	2012	8	0
Lebanon	2013	6	0
Lebanon	2014	0	0
Lebanon	2015	0	0
Lebanon	2016	0	0
Lebanon	2017	5	0
Lebanon	2018	6	0
Lebanon	2019	11	2
Lebanon	2020	1	0
Lebanon	2021	14	0
Lebanon	2022	4	0
Lebanon	2023	12	1
Lebanon	2024	4	1
Total		71	4

Scores and results list Lebanon's goal tally first, score column indicates score after each Matar goal.

List of international goals scored by Nader Matar
No.	Date	Venue	Opponent	Score	Result	Competition
1	2 August 2019	Karbala Sports City, Karbala, Iraq	Syria	1–1	2–1	2019 WAFF Championship
2	10 October 2019	Camille Chamoun Sports City Stadium, Beirut, Lebanon	Turkmenistan	2–1	2–1	2022 FIFA World Cup qualification
3	9 June 2023	Kalinga Stadium, Bhubaneswar, India	Vanuatu	1–0	3–1	2023 Intercontinental Cup
4	11 June 2024	Khalifa International Stadium, Al Rayyan, Qatar	Bangladesh	2–0	4–0	2026 FIFA World Cup qualification

== Honours ==
Asante Kotoko

- Ghana Premier League: 2011–12, 2012–13, 2013–14
- Ghanaian FA Cup: 2014
- Ghana Super Cup: 2012, 2013

Nejmeh

- Lebanese Super Cup: 2016
- Lebanese Elite Cup: 2016, 2017, 2018

Ansar

- Lebanese Premier League: 2020–21, 2024–25, 2025–26
- Lebanese FA Cup: 2020–21, 2023–24; runner-up: 2021–22
- Lebanese Elite Cup runner-up: 2022

Individual

- Lebanese Premier League Team of the Season: 2016–17

== See also ==
- List of Lebanon international footballers
- List of Lebanon international footballers born outside Lebanon
