= 2018–19 Lebanese FA Cup =

Tournament details
- Country: Lebanon
- Dates: 12 October 2018 – 25 May 2019
- Teams: 28

Final positions
- Champions: Ahed
- Runners-up: Ansar

Tournament statistics
- Matches played: 27
- Goals scored: 71 (2.63 per match)
- Top goal scorer(s): El Hadji Malick Tall (3 goals) (Note: Only Second Phase matches are taken into consideration.)

The 2018–19 Lebanese FA Cup was the 47th edition of the national football cup competition of Lebanon. It started with the First Round on 12 October 2018 and concluded with the final on 25 May 2019.

Defending champions Ahed beat Ansar in the final to win their second consecutive Lebanese FA Cup, their sixth in total. The winner qualified for the 2020 AFC Cup play-off round; however, as Ahed also won the Lebanese Premier League, the AFC Cup spot went to second-placed Ansar.

== Teams ==
Phase	Round	Dates	Clubs remaining	Clubs involved	Winners from previous round	New entries this round	Leagues entering at this round
First Phase	First Round	12–14 October 2018	28	16	none	16	12 Second Division teams 4 Third Division teams
First Phase	Second Round	17–18 November 2018	20	8	8	none	none
Second Phase	Round of 16	29–30 January 2019	16	16	4	12	12 Lebanese Premier League teams
Second Phase	Quarter-finals	27 April –10 May 2019	8	8	8	none	none
Second Phase	Semi-finals	18–19 May 2019	4	4	4	none	none
Second Phase	Final	25 May 2019	2	2	2	none	none

== First phase ==
=== First round ===
12 October 2018	Taqadom Anqoun (3)	1–0	Islah Borj Shmali (2)

12 October 2018	Shabab Bourj (2)	2–0	Sagesse (2)

12 October 2018	Sporting (3)	1–2	Ahli Saida (2)

13 October 2018	Mabarrah (2)	0–2	Homenetmen (2)

13 October 2018	Bourj (2)	1–1 (a.e.t.) (3–4 p)	Nasser Bar Elias (2)

13 October 2018	Noujoum Beirut (3)	1–4	Shabab Arabi (2)

14 October 2018	Ahli Nabatieh (2)	4–1	Nahda Barelias (2)

14 October 2018	Irshad Shhim (3)	2–1	Egtmaaey (2)

=== Second round ===
17 November 2018	Taqadom Anqoun (3)	2–1	Irshad Shhim (3)

18 November 2018	Ahli Saida (2)	0–1	Shabab Arabi (2)

18 November 2018	Shabab Bourj (2)	2–2 (a.e.t.) (5–6 p)	Homenetmen (2)

18 November 2018	Ahli Nabatieh (2)	2–0	Nasser Bar Elias (2)

== Second phase ==
=== Round of 16 ===
29 January 2019	Ahli Nabatieh (2)	0–1	Akhaa Ahli (1)	Beirut
11:30 GMT			Hijazi	Stadium: Ahed Stadium

29 January 2019	Racing Beirut (1)	0–0 (a.e.t.) (4–1 p)	Bekaa (1)	Bhamdoun
11:30 GMT				Stadium: Amin Abdelnour Stadium

29 January 2019	Salam Zgharta (1)	3–2	Chabab Ghazieh (1)	Jounieh
11:30 GMT	Niass; Boutros; Mahfoud		Maouli; Keke	Stadium: Fouad Chehab Stadium

29 January 2019	Taqadom Anqoun (3)	0–6	Nejmeh (1)	Sidon
11:30 GMT			Al Hajj; Bako; Jaafar	Stadium: Saida Municipal Stadium

30 January 2019	Shabab Arabi (2)	1–4	Ansar (1)	Beirut
11:30 GMT	Zayat		El Baba; Tall; Awada; Onika	Stadium: Ahed Stadium

30 January 2019	Homenetmen (2)	1–3	Safa (1)	Bhamdoun
11:30 GMT	Najarian (pen.)		Tahan; El Outa; Saadi	Stadium: Amin Abdelnour Stadium

30 January 2019	Tadamon Sour (1)	0–1	Tripoli (1)	Beirut
11:30 GMT			Wilson	Stadium: Safa Stadium

30 January 2019	Shabab Sahel (1)	0–1	Ahed (1)	Jounieh
11:30 GMT			Kdouh	Stadium: Fouad Chehab Stadium

=== Quarter-finals ===
27 April 2019	Racing Beirut (1)	1–0	Salam Zgharta (1)	Jounieh
13:00 GMT	Said 12' (pen.)			Stadium: Fouad Chehab Stadium

28 April 2019	Safa (1)	0–1	Akhaa Ahli (1)	Sidon
13:00 GMT			Carlos Alberto 8' (pen.)	Stadium: Saida Municipal Stadium

5 May 2019	Tripoli (1)	0–1	Ahed (1)	Bhamdoun
13:00 GMT			Sylla 109' (o.g.)	Stadium: Amin Abdelnour Stadium

10 May 2019	Ansar (1)	2–1	Nejmeh (1)	Beirut
19:30 GMT	Tall 25'; Saad 44'		Zein 77'	Stadium: Camille Chamoun Sports City Stadium

=== Semi-finals ===
18 May 2019	Ansar (1)	2–1 (a.e.t.)	Akhaa Ahli (1)	Jounieh
19:30 GMT	Tall 2'; Abo Atik 44' (o.g.)		Darwiche 44'	Stadium: Fouad Chehab Stadium

19 May 2019	Racing Beirut (1)	1–4	Ahed (1)	Bhamdoun
13:00 GMT	Mekkaoui 78'		Toshev 32', 70' (pen.); Kdouh 46'; Zreik 84'	Stadium: Amin Abdelnour Stadium

=== Final ===
25 May 2019
19:30 GMT

Ansar	0–1	Ahed
		Zreik 75'

Camille Chamoun Sports City Stadium, Beirut
Referee: Loukas Sotiriou (Cyprus)

== Bracket ==
The following is the bracket which the Lebanese FA Cup resembled. Numbers in parentheses next to the score represents the results of a penalty shoot-out.

Round of 16; 29–30 January 2019
Shabab Arabi	1
Ansar	4
Taqadom Anqoun	0
Nejmeh	6
Homenetmen	1
Safa (a.e.t.)	3
Ahli Nabatieh	0
Akhaa Ahli	1
Racing Beirut (p)	0 (4)
Bekaa	0 (1)
Salam Zgharta	3
Chabab Ghazieh	2
Tadamon Sour	0
Tripoli	1
Shabab Sahel	0
Ahed	1

Quarter-finals; 27 April–10 May 2019
Ansar	2
Nejmeh	1
Safa	0
Akhaa Ahli	1
Racing Beirut	1
Salam Zgharta	0
Tripoli	0
Ahed	1

Semi-finals; 18–19 May 2019
Ansar (a.e.t.)	2
Akhaa Ahli	1
Racing Beirut	1
Ahed	4

Final; 25 May 2019
Ansar	0
Ahed	1

== Top scorers ==
Only Second Phase matches are taken into consideration.

Rank	Player	Club	Goals
1	(Senegal) El Hadji Malick Tall	Ansar	3
2	(Lebanon) Ali Al Hajj	Nejmeh	2
2	(Lebanon) Abou Bakr Al-Mel	Nejmeh	2
2	(Syria) Mohamad Jaafar	Nejmeh	2
2	(Lebanon) Mohamad Kdouh	Ahed	2
2	(Bulgaria) Martin Toshev	Ahed	2
2	(Lebanon) Ahmad Zreik	Ahed	2
