= 2020–21 Lebanese FA Cup =

Tournament details
- Country: Lebanon
- Dates: 28 April – 12 May 2021
- Teams: 16

Final positions
- Champions: Ansar
- Runners-up: Nejmeh

Tournament statistics
- Matches played: 15
- Goals scored: 39 (2.6 per match)
- Attendance: 0 (0 per match)
- Top goal scorer(s): Mahmoud Kojok (5 goals)

The 2020–21 Lebanese FA Cup was the 48th edition of the national football cup competition of Lebanon. It started with the round of 16 on 28 April 2021, and ended on 12 May with the final.

Lebanese Premier League side Ahed were the defending champions, having won the 2018–19 edition; they lost to finalists Nejmeh in the quarter-finals. Ansar beat cross-city rivals Nejmeh on the penalty shoot-out in the final, after drawing 1–1 in regular time.

The edition followed a new format; starting directly from the round of 16, the 12 Lebanese Premier League and the top 4 Lebanese Second Division teams from the 2020–21 season participated.

== Teams ==
Round	Dates	Number of fixtures	Clubs remaining	New entries this round	Divisions entering this round
Round of 16	28–30 April 2021	8	16 → 8	16	12 Lebanese Premier League teams 4 Lebanese Second Division teams
Quarter-finals	4 May 2021	4	8 → 4	None	none
Semi-finals	8 May 2021	2	4 → 2	None	none
Final	12 May 2021	1	2 → 1	None	none

== Round of 16 ==
29 April 2021 Match 1	Bourj (1)	0–0 (5–4 p)	Sporting (2)	Beirut
16:00 UTC+3		Report		Stadium: Al Ahed Stadium; Attendance: 0 Referee: Mohammad Haddad
	Penalties
	Antar (penalty missed); Damej (penalty scored); Abboud (penalty scored); Abou Hamdan (penalty scored); Hallak (penalty scored); El Khatib (penalty scored)		(penalty scored) M. Hammoud; (penalty scored) H. Hammoud; (penalty missed) Termos; (penalty scored) Zayyat; (penalty scored) Farkouh; (penalty missed) Abbas

30 April 2021 Match 2	Akhaa Ahli Aley (1)	0–0 (4–1 p)	Sagesse (2)	Beirut
16:00 UTC+3		Report		Stadium: Al Ahed Stadium; Attendance: 0 Referee: Maher Al Ali
	Penalties
	Awada (penalty scored); Shweikh (penalty scored); Hassan (penalty scored); Nader Marrouch (penalty scored)		(penalty missed) Jawad; (penalty missed) Chehine; (penalty scored) Abdalhadi

29 April 2021 Match 3	Ansar (1)	6–1	Ahli Nabatieh (2)	Bhamdoun
16:00 UTC+3	Honeine 9'; Nassar 14'; Kojok 31', 56'; Atwi "Onika" 63'; Ayoub 77'	Report	Halawe 74'	Stadium: Amin Abdelnour Stadium; Attendance: 0 Referee: Mostafa Saifan

29 April 2021 Match 4	Chabab Ghazieh (1)	2–1	Islah Borj Shmali (2)	Ansar
16:00 UTC+3	Abou Zeid 3'; Ghaddar 12'	Report	Mannaa 36'	Stadium: Ansar Stadium; Attendance: 0 Referee: Ali Al Askhar

28 April 2021 Match 5	Ahed (1)	3–0	Tadamon Sour (1)	Sidon
16:00 UTC+3	El Ali 30'; Zein 53'; Shour 75'	Report		Stadium: Saida Municipal Stadium; Attendance: 0 Referee: Hadi Salame

29 April 2021 Match 6	Tripoli (1)	1–3	Nejmeh (1)	Jounieh
16:00 UTC+3	Ah. Moghrabi 90' (pen.)	Report	Hamam 17'; Siblini 26'; Alaaeddine 64'	Stadium: Fouad Chehab Stadium; Attendance: 0 Referee: Ali Reda

30 April 2021 Match 7	Safa (1)	1–0	Salam Zgharta (1)	Jounieh
16:00 UTC+3	Zein Tahan	Report		Stadium: Fouad Chehab Stadium; Attendance: 0 Referee: Ahmad Alaaeddine

30 April 2021 Match 8	Shabab Bourj (1)	2–1	Shabab Sahel (1)	Bhamdoun
16:00 UTC+3	Melhem 64', 89'	Report	Haidar 88'	Stadium: Amin Abdelnour Stadium; Attendance: 0 Referee: Samer Al Sayyed Kassem

== Quarter-finals ==
4 May 2021 Match 9	Bourj (1)	4–1	Akhaaa Ahli Aley (1)	Beirut
16:00 UTC+3	Antar; El Khatib; Outa	Report	Marrouch (pen.)	Stadium: Al Ahed Stadium; Attendance: 0

4 May 2021 Match 10	Ansar (1)	2–1	Chabab Ghazieh (1)	Bhamdoun
16:00 UTC+3	Kojok	Report	Abou Zeid	Stadium: Amin Abdelnour Stadium; Attendance: 0

4 May 2021 Match 11	Ahed (1)	0–1	Nejmeh (1)	Jounieh
16:00 UTC+3		Report	Mansour (o.g.)	Stadium: Fouad Chehab Stadium; Attendance: 0

4 May 2021 Match 12	Safa (1)	1–0	Shabab Bourj (1)	Sidon
16:00 UTC+3	Khreis	Report		Stadium: Saida Municipal Stadium; Attendance: 0

== Semi-finals ==
8 May 2021 Match 13	Bourj (1)	0–2	Ansar (1)	Bhamdoun
16:00 UTC+3		Report	Kojok 45+2'; El Dor 84'	Stadium: Amin Abdelnour Stadium; Attendance: 0 Referee: Hadi Salame

8 May 2021 Match 14	Nejmeh (1)	4–0	Safa (1)	Jounieh
15:45 UTC+3	Zein 13'; Awada 70'; Chehade 80'; Sabra 88'	Report		Stadium: Fouad Chehab Stadium; Attendance: 0 Referee: Ali Reda

== Final ==
12 May 2021
15:40 UTC+3

Ansar (1)	1–1	Nejmeh (1)
Matar 23'	Report	Hamam 84'
Penalties
Maatouk (penalty scored); Ayoub (penalty scored); Nassar (penalty scored)	3–1	(penalty missed) Atwi; (penalty missed) Chehade; (penalty scored) Kourani; (penalty missed) Alaaeddine

Fouad Chehab Stadium, Jounieh
Attendance: 0
Referee: Mohamad Issa

== Bracket ==
The following is the bracket which the Lebanese FA Cup resembled. Numbers in parentheses next to the score represents the results of a penalty shoot-out.

Round of 16; 28–30 April 2021
Bourj	0 (5)
Sporting	0 (4)
Akhaa Ahli Aley	0 (4)
Sagesse	0 (1)
Ansar	6
Ahli Nabatieh	1
Chabab Ghazieh	2
Islah Borj Shmali	1
Ahed	3
Tadamon Sour	0
Tripoli	1
Nejmeh	3
Safa	1
Salam Zgharta	0
Shabab Bourj	2
Shabab Sahel	1

Quarter-finals; 4 May 2021
Bourj	4
Akhaa Ahli Aley	1
Ansar	2
Chabab Ghazieh	1
Ahed	0
Nejmeh	1
Safa	1
Shabab Bourj	0

Semi-finals; 8 May 2021
Bourj	0
Ansar	2
Nejmeh	4
Safa	0

Final; 12 May 2021
Ansar	1 (3)
Nejmeh	1 (1)

== Season statistics ==
=== Top scorers ===
Rank	Player	Club	Goals
1	(Lebanon) Mahmoud Kojok	Ansar	5
2	(Lebanon) Fadel Antar	Bourj	2
2	(Lebanon) Haidar Abou Zeid	Chabab Ghazieh	2
2	(Lebanon) Adnan Melhem	Shabab Bourj	2
2	(Lebanon) Ali Hamam	Nejmeh	2
