= Ghazi Honeine =

Lebanese footballer (born 1995)

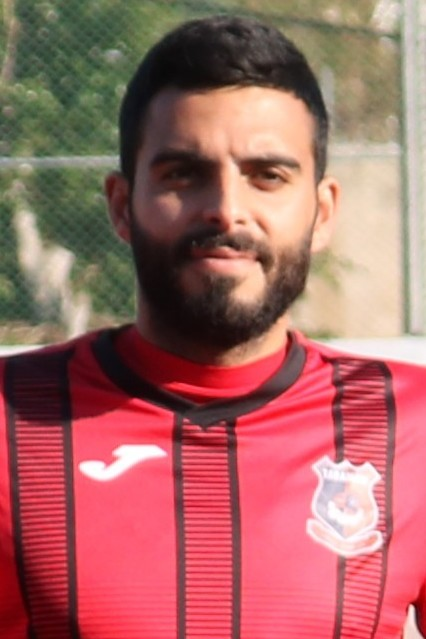
- Honeine with Tadamon Sour in 2022

Personal information
- Full name: Ghazi Youssef Honeine
- Date of birth: 12 January 1995 (age 31)
- Place of birth: Sidon, Lebanon
- Height: 1.81 m (5 ft 11 in)
- Position: Midfielder

Team information
- Current team: Hilal Nasr
- Number: 8

Youth career
- –2009: Fajr Saida
- 2009–2012: Ahed

Senior career*
Years	Team	Apps	(Gls)
2012–2018	Ahed	13	(0)
2015–2018	→ Racing Beirut (loan)	51	(0)
2018–2023	Ansar	18	(2)
2021–2022	→ Tadamon Sour (loan)	17	(0)
2023–2025	Safa	28	(0)
2026–	Hilal Nasr	10	(0)

International career
2013	Lebanon U19	3	(0)
2015–2017	Lebanon U23	5	(0)
2014–2016	Lebanon	8	(0)
- * Club domestic league appearances and goals as of 26 June 2026

Ghazi Youssef Honeine (Arabic: غازي يوسف حنيني; born 12 January 1995) is a Lebanese footballer who plays as a midfielder for Lebanese Second Division club Hilal Nasr.

Coming through the youth system, Honeine started his senior career at Ahed in 2012. In 2015 he was sent on a three-year loan to Racing Beirut, playing over 50 games. In 2018 he joined Ansar in a swap deal involving Rabih Ataya. After winning multiple titles with Ansar, he joined Safa in 2023. Honeine also represented Lebanon internationally between 2014 and 2016, playing a game at the 2018 FIFA World Cup qualifiers.

== Club career ==
=== Ahed ===
Starting his youth career at Fajr Saida, Honeine moved to Ahed in 2009, winning the youth championship on several occasions. He made his senior debut for Ahed during the 2012–13 season, coming on as a substitute against Safa on 19 May 2013.

==== Loan to Racing Beirut ====
On 25 August 2015, Racing Beirut announced the signing of Honeine on loan. He stayed at the club for three seasons, playing over 50 league games.

=== Ansar ===
On 17 August 2018, Honeine, Hassan Bittar, and Hassan Chaito moved to Ansar from Ahed, with Rabih Ataya moving the other way. On 8 July 2019, Honeine announced his decision to retire from football to pursue a future in mechanical engineering. However, on 7 October Honeine retracted his decision. In 2020–21, he helped Ansar win their first league title since 2007, and their 14th overall. Honeine also helped Ansar win the double, beating Nejmeh in the 2020–21 Lebanese FA Cup final on penalty shoot-outs.

==== Loan to Tadamon Sour ====
On 9 July 2021, Honeine was sent on loan to Tadamon Sour.

=== Safa ===
Honeine joined Safa following the 2022–23 season.

== International career ==
Honeine was first called up to the Lebanon national team in October 2014, as part of a mixed squad of senior and Olympic players for friendly matches against Qatar and Saudi Arabia. He made his international debut on 9 October 2014, against Qatar. He also represented Lebanon in the 2018 FIFA World Cup qualifiers, playing against South Korea on 24 March 2016.

== Honours ==
Ahed

- Lebanese Premier League: 2014–15
- Lebanese Elite Cup: 2013

Racing Beirut

- Lebanese Challenge Cup: 2016, 2017

Ansar

- Lebanese Premier League: 2020–21
- Lebanese FA Cup: 2020–21
- Lebanese Elite Cup: 2019
