= Jihad Ayoub =

Footballer (born 1995)

- Ayoub with Lebanon in 2024

Personal information
- Full name: Jihad Khaled Ayoub
- Date of birth: 30 March 1995 (age 31)
- Place of birth: Porlamar, Venezuela
- Height: 1.87 m (6 ft 2 in)
- Positions: Defensive midfielder; centre-back

Team information
- Current team: Jwaya
- Number: 5

Youth career
- Margarita
- Millwall
- Notts County
- Melita

Senior career*
Years	Team	Apps	(Gls)
2017–2018	Ahed	1	(1)
2017–2018	→ Shabab Sahel (loan)		
2018–2019	Bekaa	20	(2)
2019–2022	Ansar	31	(2)
2022–2024	PSS Sleman	46	(6)
2024–2025	Safa	22	(2)
2025–	Jwaya	21	(1)

International career^{‡}
2021–	Lebanon	26	(2)
- * Club domestic league appearances and goals as of 09:43, 3 August 2026 (UTC) ‡ National team caps and goals as of 4 June 2026

Jihad Khaled Ayoub (Arabic: جهاد خالد أيوب; born 30 March 1995) is a professional footballer who plays as a defensive midfielder or centre-back for Lebanese Premier League club Jwaya. Born in Venezuela, he plays for the Lebanon national team.

== Club career ==
=== Early career ===
Ayoub played at youth level for academies in Venezuela, Argentina, England, and Malta. He played for his university team in Venezuela before moving on to professional clubs. His youth career includes stints at Margarita in Venezuela, Millwall and Notts County in England, and Melita in Malta, where he played for their under-21 team.

Ayoub joined Lebanese Premier League side Ahed in January 2017, helping them lift the league title in 2016–17. He was sent on a one-year loan to Lebanese Second Division side Shabab Sahel for the 2017–18 season, where they finished in first place and were promoted to the Premier League.

=== Bekaa ===
He moved to Bekaa on a free transfer in summer 2018. On 24 February 2019, Ayoub assisted both of Bekaa's goals against Ansar in a 2–2 draw. He finished the season with two goals in 20 games, and was regarded as one of the club's best-performing players in the 2018–19 season.

=== Ansar ===
Following a trial with the club, Ayoub joined Ansar on a two-year contract in May 2019. Having extended his contract in July 2020, Ayoub announced his decision to end his contract in March 2021. He returned to the club the same month, and helped Ansar win the domestic double (league and Lebanese FA Cup) in 2020–21. Ayoub renewed his contract in July 2021.

=== PSS Sleman ===
On 6 July 2022, Ayoub joined Indonesian club PSS Sleman.

=== Safa and Jwaya ===
Ayoub returned to Lebanon on 20 July 2024, joining Lebanese Premier League club Safa.

On 7 August 2025, Ayoub joined newly promoted side Jwaya.

== International career ==
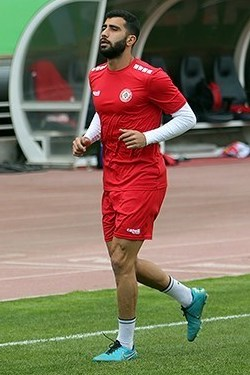
Ayoub training with the Lebanon national team in 2022

Ayoub made his international debut for Lebanon on 1 December 2021, as a substitute in a 1–0 defeat to Egypt at the 2021 FIFA Arab Cup. In December 2023, Ayoub was included in the Lebanese squad for the 2023 AFC Asian Cup. He scored his first international goal on 4 September 2024 against Tajikistan during the 2024 Merdeka Tournament.

== Career statistics ==
=== International ===
As of match played 4 June 2026

Appearances and goals by national team and year
National team	Year	Apps	Goals
Lebanon	2021	2	0
Lebanon	2022	2	0
Lebanon	2023	9	0
Lebanon	2024	8	1
Lebanon	2025	4	1
Lebanon	2026	1	0
Total		26	2

Scores and results list Lebanon's goal tally first, score column indicates score after each Ayoub goal.

List of international goals scored by Jihad Ayoub
No.	Date	Venue	Opponent	Score	Result	Competition
1	4 September 2024	Bukit Jalil National Stadium, Kuala Lumpur, Malaysia	Tajikistan	1–0	1–0	2024 Merdeka Tournament
2	9 October 2025	Grand Hamad Stadium, Doha, Qatar	Bhutan	2–0	2–0	2027 AFC Asian Cup qualification

== Honours ==
Ahed

- Lebanese Premier League: 2016–17

Shabab Sahel

- Lebanese Second Division: 2017–18

Ansar

- Lebanese Premier League: 2020–21
- Lebanese FA Cup: 2020–21; runner-up: 2021–22
- Lebanese Elite Cup: 2019
- Lebanese Super Cup: 2021

== See also ==
- List of Lebanon international footballers born outside Lebanon
