= 2019 Lebanese Elite Cup =

2019 edition of the Lebanese Elite Cup

Tournament details
- Country: Lebanon
- Dates: 20 July – 25 August
- Teams: 6

Final positions
- Champions: Shabab Sahel (1st title)
- Runners-up: Ansar

Tournament statistics
- Matches played: 9
- Goals scored: 27 (3 per match)
- Attendance: 15,000 (1,667 per match)
- Top goal scorer(s): Hassan Maatouk (4 goals)

The 2019 Lebanese Elite Cup was the 22nd edition of the Lebanese Elite Cup. The competition included the six best teams from the 2018–19 Lebanese Football League season. The first matchday was played on 20 July, one day after the start of the 2019 Lebanese Challenge Cup. Nejmeh were the defending champions, having won the 2018 final. The final was held on 25 August, with Shabab Sahel beating Ansar on penalty shoot-outs.

== Group stage ==
=== Group A ===
Pos	Team	Pld	W	D	L	GF	GA	GD	Pts	Qualification
1	Shabab Sahel	2	2	0	0	4	0	+4	6	Qualification for the semi-finals
2	Chabab Ghazieh	2	0	1	1	2	3	−1	1	Qualification for the semi-finals
3	Ahed	2	0	1	1	2	5	−3	1	

Source: Goalzz
20 July 2019
17:00 UTC+3

Ahed	0–3	Shabab Sahel
	Report	Awada 56'; Nasreddine 74'; Daouda 87'

Amin Abdelnour Stadium, Bhamdoun
Attendance: 300
Referee: Mohamed Ghadar

24 July 2019
17:00 UTC+3

Ahed	2–2	Chabab Ghazieh
Fahes 45'; Majed 60'	Report	R. Fakih 36'; A. Fakih 68'

Amin Abdelnour Stadium, Bhamdoun
Attendance: 100
Referee: Mohamed Haddad

28 July 2019
17:00 UTC+3

Shabab Sahel	1–0	Chabab Ghazieh
Coulibaly 16'	Report

Amin Abdelnour Stadium, Bhamdoun
Attendance: 600
Referee: Sheikh Ahmed Alaeddin

=== Group B ===
Pos	Team	Pld	W	D	L	GF	GA	GD	Pts	Qualification
1	Ansar	2	2	0	0	4	1	+3	6	Qualification for the semi-finals
2	Akhaa Ahli	2	1	0	1	1	1	0	3	Qualification for the semi-finals
3	Nejmeh	2	0	0	2	1	4	−3	0	

Source: Goalzz
20 July 2019
17:00 UTC+3

Ansar	1–0	Akhaa Ahli
Kojok 80'	Report

Fouad Chehab Stadium, Jounieh
Attendance: 1,000
Referee: Mohamed Haddad

24 July 2019
17:00 UTC+3

Ansar	3–1	Nejmeh
Chaito 28'; Maatouk 44'; Louati 54'	Report	Abudu 90+1'

Tripoli Municipal Stadium, Tripoli
Attendance: 5,000
Referee: Maher Al-Ali

14 August 2019
17:00 UTC+3

Akhaa Ahli	1–0	Nejmeh
Darwiche 50'	Report

Tripoli Municipal Stadium, Tripoli
Attendance: 1,000
Referee: Mohammed Haddad

== Final stage ==
Semi-finals; 18 August 2019
Shabab Sahel	2
Akhaa Ahli	0
Ansar	5
Chabab Ghazieh	0

Final; 25 August 2019
Shabab Sahel (p)	3 (5)
Ansar	3 (3)

=== Semi-finals ===
18 August 2019
16:30 UTC+3

Shabab Sahel	2–0	Akhaa Ahli
Ndaye 25'; Kourani 58'	Report

Fouad Chehab Stadium, Jounieh
Referee: Mohammed Issa

18 August 2019
16:30 UTC+3

Ansar	5–0	Chabab Ghazieh
Maatouk 9' (pen.), 67'; Saad 20', 62'; Moisés Lucas 33'	Report

Amin Abdelnour Stadium, Bhamdoun Stadium
Attendance: 1,000
Referee: Hadi Salama

=== Final ===
25 August 2019
21:30 UTC+3

Shabab Sahel	3–3 (a.e.t.)	Ansar
A. Atwi 41'; Daouda 48'; Coulibaly 55'	Report	Onika 18'; Maatouk 60'; Hadji Malick 65'
Penalties
A. Atwi (penalty scored); Coulibaly (penalty scored); Assi (penalty scored); Kourani (penalty scored); Daouda (penalty scored)	5–3	(penalty scored) Maatouk; (penalty missed) Louati; (penalty scored) Hadji Malick; (penalty scored) Kojok

Camille Chamoun Sports City Stadium, Beirut
Attendance: 6,000
Referee: Ali J. Reda

== Top scorers ==
Rank	Player	Club	Goals
1	(Lebanon) Hassan Maatouk	Ansar	4
2	(Lebanon) Soony Saad	Ansar	2
2	(Senegal) Bakary Coulibaly	Shabab Sahel	2
2	(Ghana) Daouda Diémé	Shabab Sahel	2
3	17 players		1
