= Mahmoud Kojok (footballer, born 1991) =

Lebanese footballer (born 1991)

- Kojok with Lebanon in 2013

Personal information
- Full name: Mahmoud Mohammad Kojok
- Date of birth: 1 April 1991 (age 35)
- Place of birth: Jieh, Lebanon
- Height: 1.83 m (6 ft 0 in)
- Position: Striker

Team information
- Current team: Ansar
- Number: 22

Senior career*
Years	Team	Apps	(Gls)
2008–2021	Ansar	102+	(14)
2015–2016	→ Racing Beirut (loan)	20	(2)
2018–2019	→ Shabab Sahel (loan)	17	(1)
Total		139+	(17)

International career
2012	Lebanon U22	5	(2)
2011	Lebanon U23	2	(0)
2012–2016	Lebanon	8	(0)
- * Club domestic league appearances and goals

Mahmoud Mohammad Kojok (Arabic: محمود محمد كجك; born 1 April 1991) is a Lebanese former footballer who played as a striker.

Starting his career at Ansar in 2008, remained at the club until his retirement in 2021. He also had stints at Racing Beirut and Shabab Sahel on loan. With Ansar, Kojok won multiple titles, namely a Lebanese Premier League title, four Lebanese FA Cups, and two Lebanese Super Cups.

Having already represented Lebanon internationally at youth level, Kojok made his senior debut at the 2012 WAFF Championship. He also participated in the 2014 FIFA World Cup qualifiers.

== Club career ==
Kojok began his career at Ansar during the 2008–09 Lebanese Premier League. He was sent on a one-year loan to Racing Beirut on 16 September 2015, scoring two goals in 20 games in the 2015–16 season. On 10 August 2018, Kojok joined Shabab Sahel on loan for one year.

Kojok scored two braces in a row in the 2020–21 Lebanese FA Cup for Ansar, against Ahli Nabatieh and Chabab Ghazieh on 29 April and 4 May 2021 respectively. With five goals, Kojok helped Ansar lift the cup as the competition's top goalscorer. On 21 May, Kojok scored a bicycle kick goal against Markaz Balata in the 2021 AFC Cup group stage, to help Ansar win 2–0.

On 27 September 2021, Kojok announced his retirement from football.

== International career ==
Kojok made his debut for Lebanon at the 2012 WAFF Championship, in a 1–0 defeat to Palestine on 11 December 2012. He featured in the 2014 FIFA World Cup qualifiers, in a game against Iran on 11 June 2013. Kojok played eight games for Lebanon internationally.

== Personal life ==
Kojok holds a master's degree in financial engineering. Following his retirement as a footballer, Kojok moved to Saudi Arabia for work.

== Honours ==
Ansar

- Lebanese Premier League: 2020–21
- Lebanese FA Cup: 2009–10, 2011–12, 2016–17, 2020–21
- Lebanese Super Cup: 2012, 2021; runner-up: 2017, 2019
- Lebanese Elite Cup runner-up: 2010, 2016, 2019

Individual

- Lebanese FA Cup top goalscorer: 2020–21
