= Elhadji Malick Tall =

Senegalese footballer (born 1995)

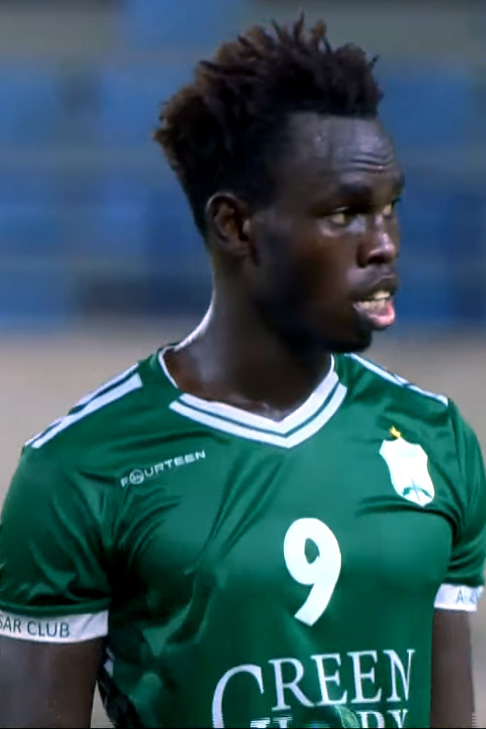
- Tall with Ansar in 2019

Personal information
- Full name: Elhadji Malick Tall
- Date of birth: 25 January 1995 (age 31)
- Place of birth: Thiaroye-sur-Mer, Senegal
- Height: 1.77 m (5 ft 10 in)
- Position: Striker

Team information
- Current team: Ansar
- Number: 9

Senior career*
Years	Team	Apps	(Gls)
2013–2014	Atlantic FC		
2014–2016	Al-Wehdat		(15)
2016–2017	Al-Ahli Amman		(9)
2017–2018	Ansar	22	(15)
2018	Ohod	0	(0)
2018–2020	Ansar	23	(24)
2020–2022	Al-Riyadh		(39)
2022–2024	Ansar	47	(43)
2025	Al-Nahda	11	(7)
2025–2026	Naft Maysan	1	(0)
2026–	Ansar	11	(12)
- * Club domestic league appearances and goals as of 2 August 2026

Elhadji Malick Tall (born 25 January 1995) is a Senegalese professional footballer who plays as a striker for Lebanese Premier League club Ansar.

After playing for three seasons in Jordan, first for Al-Wehdat and then for Al-Ahli, he joined Lebanese side Ansar in 2017. He was the top scorer in the Lebanese Premier League in his first two seasons, scoring 15 and 20 goals respectively. In 2020, Tall joined Al-Riyadh in Saudi Arabia, where he was the Saudi Second Division top scorer with 22 goals in 2020–21. He returned to Ansar in 2022, where he was crowned top scorer of the Lebanese Premier League in 2023 and 2024, before leaving in 2024.

Tall is considered the best foreign striker to have played in Lebanon, having been crowned Lebanese Premier League top scorer in all four seasons he played.

== Career ==
=== Al-Wehdat ===
Tall played for Jordanian team Al-Wehdat for two seasons, scoring 15 league goals in total (eight in the first season and seven in the second). On 10 March 2015, he scored his first AFC Cup goal against Saudi club Al-Nahda in the group stage. His first AFC Champions League goal came one year later, on 9 February 2016, in a 2–1 loss to Al-Ittihad.

=== Al-Ahli Amman ===
In 2016, Tall joined Syrian club Al-Ahli on a one-year contract after having played with Al-Wehdat for two years. On 30 December 2016, he scored a hat-trick in a 4–0 win against Al-Baqa'a. On 6 March 2017, he scored his first AFC Cup goal for his team in a 1–1 draw to Al-Zawra'a. He ended the 2016–17 season as the league's joint second top scorer, scoring nine goals throughout the season.

=== Ansar ===
==== 2017–18 season ====
On 26 July 2017, it was announced that Tall had joined Lebanese club Ansar. On 17 September 2017, he scored on his league debut against Tripoli in a 5–1 away win. His first league brace, hat-trick and haul came simultaneously in the Beirut derby against Nejmeh on 2 October 2017, scoring four goals in a 5–1 away win. He was the first player to score four goals in one match against Nejmeh. On 27 February 2018 he scored his first AFC Cup goal for Ansar, in a 1–3 home loss against Jordanian side Al-Faisaly.

He scored a total of 15 league goals in 22 games, making him the top scorer of the 2017–18 season. He was also part of the 2017–18 Lebanese Premier League Team of the Season for his performances.

==== 2018–19 season ====
In August 2018, Tall signed for Saudi Arabian club Ohod for $120,000 on a three-year contract, after passing his medical. However, the club was unable to register him after filling its foreign-player quota, and he returned to Ansar without making an official appearance.

On his first league game of the season, played on 21 September 2018, he scored a goal against Nejmeh in a 4–2 away loss. He scored three consecutive braces in three league games, from 4 to 25 November 2018, against Chabab Ghazieh, Bekaa and Tripoli, scoring six of Ansar's nine goals in those games. On 15 February 2019, in Beirut Municipal Stadium's first game in over two years, Tall scored a brace against Salam Zgharta. On 19 May 2019, Tall scored against Akhaa Ahli in the Lebanese FA Cup semi-final in a 2–1 win, helping his team reach the final.

Tall finished the season as the league top scorer for the second time in a row, with 20 goals in 20 appearances. He became only the fourth player to retain the Golden Boot in the Lebanese Premier League. Tall also scored three goals in the Lebanese FA Cup, bringing his total seasonal tally to 22. He was included in the 2018–19 Lebanese Premier League Team of the Season.

==== 2019–20 season ====
Tall scored four goals in the 2019–20 season's first three games. In the 2020 AFC Cup, Tall scored a brace, his first in the AFC Cup, against Al-Faisaly on 24 February 2020. After scoring in the first half, Tall scored a 96th minute penalty to help his side win 4–3. On 13 March 2020, Ansar terminated Tall's contract due to administrative issues within the club.

=== Al-Riyadh ===
On 15 September 2020, Tall joined Saudi Second Division club Al-Riyadh; he reunited with former Ansar teammate Houssem Louati. Tall finished the season as the league top scorer, with 22 goals in the 2020–21 season. He scored 17 goals in the following season.

=== Return to Ansar ===
On 1 July 2022, Tall returned to Ansar in the Lebanese Premier League ahead of the 2022–23 season, reportedly on a $USD180,000 per season contract. He finished top scorer in the 2022–23 and 2023–24 seasons, becoming the only player to be crowned Lebanese Premier League top scorer more than twice, for a total of four times. With 19 goals against Nejmeh, Tall became the leading top scorer in the Beirut derby. Tall left Ansar in December 2024, as a result of the suspension of the 2024–25 Lebanese Premier League due to Israel's aggression on Lebanon.

=== Al-Nahda and Naft Maysan ===
In January 2025, Tall signed for Al-Nahda in Oman. In August 2025, he signed for Naft Maysan in Iraq, with whom he terminated his contract in January 2026.

=== Second return to Ansar ===
In January 2026, Tall returned to Ansar mid-2025–26 season. On 29 June 2026, he scored a hat-trick against Mabarra in a 7–0 win. He scored in the last matchday of the season, a 2–1 win against Nejmeh, winning his first league title. Tall finished the season with 12 goals in 11 appearances.

== Honours ==
Al-Wehdat

- Jordanian Pro League: 2014–15, 2015–16
- Jordan Super Cup runner up: 2015, 2016

Ansar

- Lebanese Premier League: 2025–26
- Lebanese FA Cup: 2023–24; runner up: 2018–19
- Lebanese Elite Cup runner up: 2019, 2022
- Lebanese Super Cup runner up: 2017, 2019

Individual

- Lebanese Premier League Team of the Season: 2017–18, 2018–19
- Lebanese Premier League top scorer: 2017–18, 2018–19, 2022–23, 2023–24
- Lebanese FA Cup top scorer: 2018–19
- Lebanese Elite Cup top scorer: 2022
- Saudi Second Division top scorer: 2020–21
