= Khaled Takaji =

Lebanese footballer (born 1986)

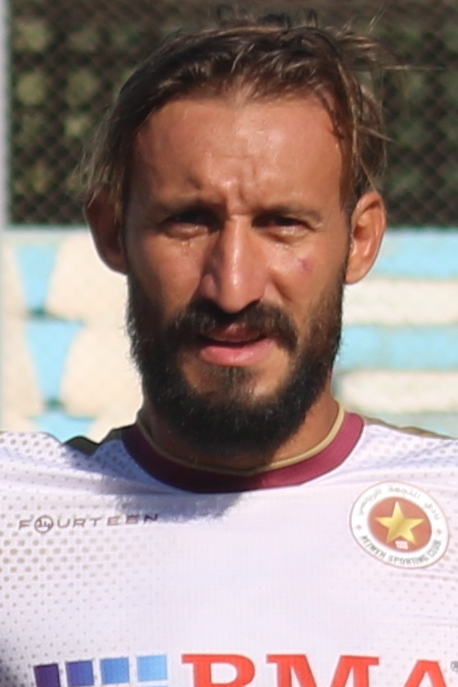
- Takaji with Nejmeh in 2021

Personal information
- Full name: Khaled Mohamad Takaji
- Date of birth: 18 November 1986 (age 39)
- Place of birth: Beirut, Lebanon
- Height: 1.76 m (5 ft 9 in)
- Position: Forward

Team information
- Current team: Tripoli
- Number: 10

Youth career
- 2000–2006: Nejmeh

Senior career*
Years	Team	Apps	(Gls)
2006–2008	Nejmeh		
2008–2010	Pro's Cafe Beirut (futsal)		
2011	Sadaka (futsal)		
2012	All Sports Club (futsal)		
2012–2017	Nejmeh	96	(24)
2016	Mayadeen (futsal)		
2017–2018	Ansar	19	(5)
2018–2019	Akhaa Ahli Aley	17	(2)
2019–2022	Nejmeh	32	(7)
2022–2023	Bourj	21	(4)
2023–2025	Safa	36	(4)
2025–	Tripoli	24	(9)

International career
2007–2013	Lebanon (futsal)		(63)
2015	Lebanon	3	(0)
- * Club domestic league appearances and goals as of 26 July 2026

Khaled Mohamad Takaji (Arabic: خالد محمد التكه جي; born 18 November 1986) is a Lebanese footballer and former futsal player who plays as a forward for Lebanese Premier League club Tripoli.

== Club career ==
Takaji signed for Lebanese Premier League side Nejmeh's youth sector on 4 August 2000; he was promoted to the first team ahead of the 2006–07 season.

In 2008, Takaji decided to pursue a career as a futsal player, joining Pro's Cafe Beirut, with whom he played at the 2010 AFC Futsal Club Championship. He then played for Sadaka and All Sports Club at the 2011 and 2012 AFC Futsal Club Championships, respectively.

On 23 August 2012, Takaji returned to Nejmeh. In June 2016, Takaji played at the 2016 AFC Futsal Club Championship for Mayadeen. He moved to Ansar, Nejmeh's rivals, on 3 August 2017. After one season, on 28 August 2018, Takaji joined Akhaa Ahli Aley.

Takaji returned to Nejmeh for a second time ahead of the 2019–20 season. He renewed his contract for one year on 4 August 2020, and for another year on 1 July 2021, following the 2020–21 season where he scored four goals and made six assists.

On 23 August 2022, Takaji signed for Bourj on a free transfer. He moved to Safa on 23 July 2023.

== International career ==
Takaji represented Lebanon internationally in futsal, playing at the 2007, 2008, 2010, and 2012 AFC Futsal Championships, captaining Lebanon in the last edition. With 13 goals, Takaji was the 2008 Arab Futsal Championship top scorer, and was awarded the Best Player award. He also helped Lebanon to a sixth-place finish at the 2010 Mediterranean Futsal Cup.

Takaji also played for the Lebanon national football team in 2015, in two friendly games against Syria and Jordan, and a 2018 FIFA World Cup qualifying game against Laos.

== Style of play ==
A versatile forward, Takaji is capable of playing as a second striker or a winger.

== Personal life ==
Takaji is married to Mariam Hamadani. She gave birth to their daughter Celine on 2 October 2018.

== Honours ==
Nejmeh

- Lebanese Premier League: 2013–14
- Lebanese FA Cup: 2015–16, 2021–22; runner-up: 2014–15, 2020–21
- Lebanese Elite Cup: 2014, 2016, 2021; runner-up: 2013
- Lebanese Super Cup: 2014, 2016; runner-up: 2021

Individual

- Lebanese Premier League Team of the Season: 2013–14, 2014–15
