= Nassar Nassar =

Lebanese footballer (born 1992)

- Nassar with Lebanon in 2024

Personal information
- Full name: Nassar Mahmoud Nassar
- Date of birth: 1 January 1992 (age 34)
- Place of birth: Tyre, Lebanon
- Height: 1.69 m (5 ft 7 in)
- Position: Right-back

Team information
- Current team: Ansar
- Number: 5

Senior career*
Years	Team	Apps	(Gls)
2010–2014	Salam Sour	34+	(2+)
2014–2015	Tadamon Sour	21	(2)
2015–2016	Nabi Chit	21	(2)
2016–	Ansar	184	(3)

International career^{‡}
2016–	Lebanon	34	(0)
- * Club domestic league appearances and goals as of 09:27, 3 August 2026 (UTC) ‡ National team caps and goals as of 4 June 2026

Nassar Mahmoud Nassar (Arabic: نصار محمود نصار, Lebanese Arabic pronunciation: [nɑsˤˈsˤɑːr maħˈmuːd nɑsˤˈsˤɑːr]; born 1 January 1992) is a Lebanese footballer who plays as a right-back for Lebanese Premier League club Ansar and the Lebanon national team.

== Club career ==
Nassar began his career with hometown club Salam Sour, before moving to cross-city rivals Tadamon Sour. In July 2014, Nassar joined Nabi Chit.

In June 2016, Nassar joined Ansar. On 2 February 2019, his contract was renewed for three years. On 6 February, Nassar suffered an ACL injury during a match against Tripoli. He recovered in August. On 14 August 2021, Ansar renewed his contract for three years. On 10 May 2024, Ansar renewed his contract for three more years.

== International career ==
Nassar's first international game for Lebanon came as a starter against Equatorial Guinea on 11 October 2016, playing the whole 90 minutes in a 0–0 home draw. In December 2018, Nassar was called up for the preliminary squad in view of the 2019 AFC Asian Cup. However, he was forced to abandon the group early due to injury. In December 2023, Nassar was included in the Lebanese squad for the 2023 AFC Asian Cup.

== Style of play ==
Mainly a right-back, Nassar can also play as a left-back or as a winger. He is known for his speed.

== Personal life ==
Nassar's favourite club worldwide is Spanish side Real Madrid, while is favourite club in the Arab world is Jordanian club Al-Wehdat, due to being a fan of Jordanian coach Abdullah Abu Zema.

== Career statistics ==
=== International ===
As of match played 4 June 2026

Appearances and goals by national team and year
National team	Year	Apps	Goals
Lebanon	2016	3	0
Lebanon	2017	3	0
Lebanon	2018	5	0
Lebanon	2019	0	0
Lebanon	2020	1	0
Lebanon	2021	1	0
Lebanon	2022	0	0
Lebanon	2023	4	0
Lebanon	2024	12	0
Lebanon	2025	4	0
Lebanon	2026	1	0
Total		34	0

== Honours ==
Ansar

- Lebanese Premier League: 2020–21, 2024–25, 2025–26
- Lebanese FA Cup: 2016–17, 2020–21, 2023–24; runner-up: 2021–22
- Lebanese Super Cup: 2021; runner-up: 2017
- Lebanese Elite Cup runner-up: 2016, 2022

Individual

- Lebanese Premier League Team of the Season: 2016–17
