= Edmond Chehade =

Lebanese footballer (born 1993)

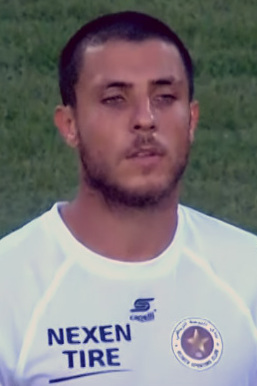
- Chehade with Nejmeh in 2019

Personal information
- Full name: Edmond Joseph Chehade
- Date of birth: 30 September 1993 (age 33)
- Place of birth: Zgharta, Lebanon
- Height: 1.76 m (5 ft 9 in)
- Position: Forward

Team information
- Current team: Tripoli
- Number: 77

Senior career*
Years	Team	Apps	(Gls)
- Chekka
- Tripoli Fayhaa (futsal)
–2015	Sadaka (futsal)		
2015–2019	Salam Zgharta	83	(12)
2019–2023	Nejmeh	36	(2)
2023–2024	Ansar	3	(0)
2024–2025	Racing Beirut	25	(4)
2025	Sagesse	10	(0)
2026–	Tripoli	8	(0)

International career
- Lebanon (futsal)
2016–2018	Lebanon	2	(0)
- * Club domestic league appearances and goals as of 21 June 2026

Edmond Joseph Chehade (Arabic: إدمون جوزيف شحادة; born 30 September 1993) is a Lebanese footballer and former futsal player who plays as a forward for Lebanese Premier League club Tripoli.

== Club career ==
Born in Zgharta, Lebanon, Chehade moved to Batroun. He began playing football for Chekka in the Lebanese Third Division, before moving to futsal, playing for Tripoli Fayhaa and Sadaka, with whom he won the 2012–13 league title.

Chehade returned to play football, joining Salam Zgharta in the 2015–16 Lebanese Premier League. On 11 September 2019, Nejmeh announced the signing of Chehade for a fee of USD$150,000. He moved to cross-city rivals Ansar on 4 May 2023. After having played only five games with Ansar, Chehade moved to Racing Beirut in August 2024.

== International career ==
Chehade played for the Lebanon national futsal team. He made his international debut for the national football team in 2016, in a friendly against Palestine.

== Personal life ==
In 2014, Chehade represented Lebanon for the first season of the reality show The Victorious, finishing among the finalists.

== Honours ==
Sadaka (futsal)

- Lebanese Futsal League: 2012–13

Nejmeh

- Lebanese FA Cup: 2021–22, 2022–23; runner-up: 2020–21
- Lebanese Elite Cup: 2021
- Lebanese Super Cup runner-up: 2021

Ansar

- Lebanese FA Cup: 2023–24
