= Hussein El Dor =

Lebanese footballer (born 1994)

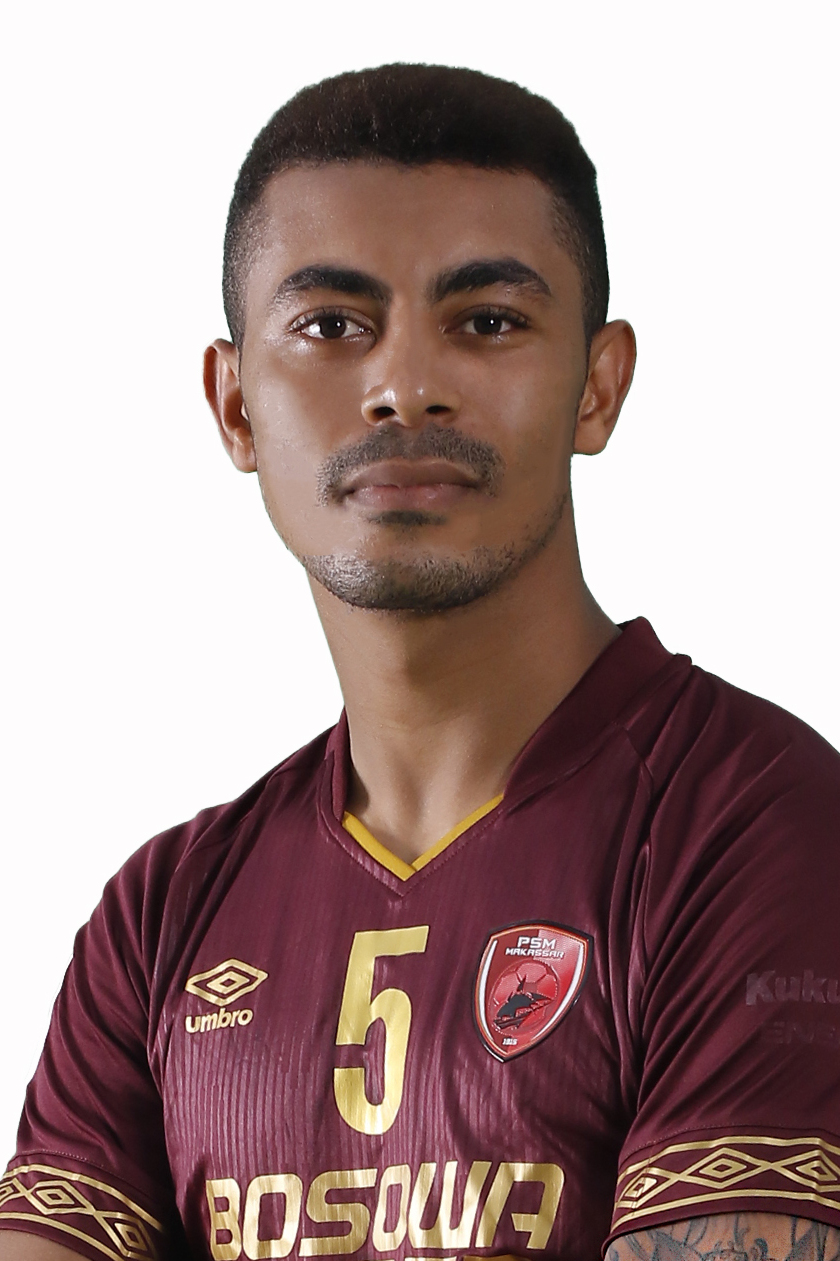
- El Dor with PSM Makassar in 2020

Personal information
- Full name: Hussein Mohamed El Dor
- Date of birth: 18 January 1994 (age 32)
- Place of birth: Tanda, Ivory Coast
- Height: 1.89 m (6 ft 2 in)
- Position: Centre-back

Team information
- Current team: Sagesse
- Number: 5

Youth career
- 2008–2013: Ahed

Senior career*
Years	Team	Apps	(Gls)
2013–2014	Ahed	11	(0)
2014–2017	Shabab Sahel	32	(2)
2017–2018	New Radiant		
2018–2019	Churchill Brothers	25	(0)
2019	Perak	6	(0)
2020	PSM Makassar	3	(1)
2020–2023	Shabab Sahel	0	(0)
2020–2023	→ Ansar (loan)	35	(2)
2023–2025	Safa	8	(1)
2025–	Sagesse	16	(1)

International career^{‡}
2009	Lebanon U16	4	(0)
2011	Lebanon U19	4	(0)
2013	Lebanon U20		
2015	Lebanon U23	2	(0)
2021–2022	Lebanon	5	(0)
- * Club domestic league appearances and goals as of 8 July 2026 ‡ National team caps and goals as of 29 March 2022

Hussein Mohamed El Dor (Arabic: حسين محمد الدر, Lebanese Arabic pronunciation: [ħ(u)seːn dˈdorr]; born 18 January 1994) is a Lebanese professional footballer who plays as a centre-back for Lebanese Premier League club Sagesse.

Making his senior debut in 2013 at Ahed in Lebanon, El Dor moved to Shabab Sahel in 2014. After three years, El Dor moved to the Maldives, playing for New Radiant for six months and winning the 2017 Dhivehi Premier League. In 2018, he moved to Churchill Brothers in India where he stayed for one year and a half. El Dor moved to Malaysian side Perak in summer 2019, before joining PSM Makassar in Indonesia six months later. In September 2020, El Dor moved back to Lebanon, joining Ansar. After winning a league, FA Cup and Super Cup title, El Dor moved to Safa in 2023 and to Sagesse in 2025.

Born in the Ivory Coast to an Ivorian mother and a Lebanese father, El Dor holds dual-citizenship. He played for Lebanon internationally at youth level between 2009 and 2015, making his senior-team debut in 2021.

== Early life ==
Born on 18 January 1994 in Tanda, Ivory Coast, El Dor moved to Lebanon aged five. Playing football in the streets from an early age, his family decided to register him at Ahed's youth academy in Beirut.

== Club career ==
=== Ahed ===
Hussein El Dor began his senior career in the 2012–13 season, at Lebanese Premier League side Ahed. El Dor made his league debut on 31 March 2013, in an 8–0 home win against Salam Sour. He ended the season with five appearances. In the 2013–14 season, El Dor made six appearances.

=== Shabab Sahel ===
In July 2014, El Dor joined Shabab Sahel. His debut for his new club came on 2 November 2014 against Tadamon Sour, in a 3–0 home win. He made eight league appearances during the 2014–15 season. In 2015–16, El Dor made four appearances.

As the runner-up of The Victorious, a reality TV show showcasing football talent in the Middle East, for the second half of the 2015–16 season, El Dor tested for Portuguese club Benfica under Hélder Cristóvão.

El Dor's first league goal came in the 2016–17 season, scoring against Salam Zgharta on 4 November 2016. El Dor scored a second goal, on 25 February 2017, against Tripoli. He ended the season with two goals in 20 appearances.

=== New Radiant ===
Amidst offers from Lebanese clubs Nejmeh and Ansar, on 12 July 2017 El Dor moved to New Radiant in the Maldives on a six-month contract. There, he won the domestic treble: the Dhivehi Premier League, the Maldives FA Cup and the President's Cup.

=== Churchill Brothers ===
On 13 January 2018, El Dor joined I-League side Churchill Brothers. He made his league debut on 19 January 2018 against Shillong Lajong, in a 2–0 home win. El Dor ended the 2017–18 season with 11 appearances for the club. The following season, in 2018–19, El Dor made 14 appearances.

=== Perak ===
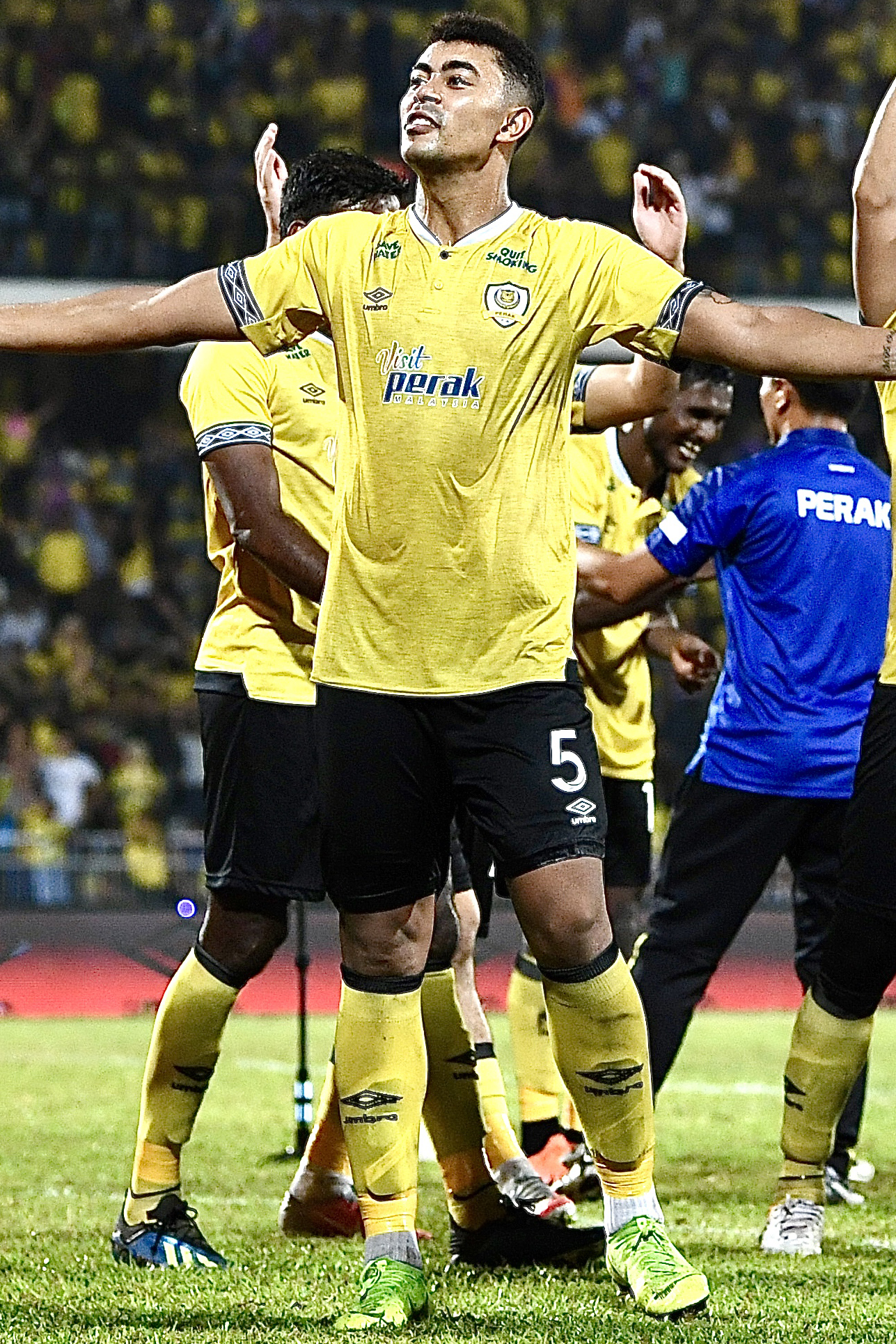
El Dor with Perak in 2019

On 17 May 2019, El Dor joined Malaysian side Perak on a six-month contract. Regarding his choice on moving to Malaysia, El Dor stated that he was "really excited about the success of compatriot Mohammed Ghaddar". He made his Super League debut on 19 May 2019, in a 0–0 draw against Pahang. El Dor ended the 2019 season with six appearances in the league, and three in the Malaysia FA Cup.

=== PSM Makassar ===
On 10 January 2020, El Dor moved to Indonesian side PSM Makassar. On 1 March 2019, El Dor scored a header on his league debut, helping his side win 2–1 against PSS Sleman. El Dor helped PSM Makassar qualify to the group stage of the 2020 AFC Cup, beating Lalenok United 7–2 on aggregate in the play-off round on 22 and 29 January. He played three games in the group stage, before the competition was cancelled due to the COVID-19 pandemic.

=== Ansar ===
On 30 September 2020, El Dor moved back to Lebanon, joining Lebanese Premier League side Ansar on a two-year loan from Shabab Sahel ahed of the 2020–21 season. He made his debut on 18 October 2020, playing the whole 90 minutes in a 3–0 league win over Chabab Ghazieh. El Dor helped Ansar win their first league title since 2007, and their 14th overall. He also helped Ansar win the double, beating Nejmeh in the 2020–21 Lebanese FA Cup final on penalty shoot-outs. On 5 August 2022, Ansar extended El Dor's loan from Sahel for an additional year.

=== Safa and Sagesse ===
On 1 July 2023, El Dor moved to Safa. He moved to Sagesse in August 2025.

== International career ==
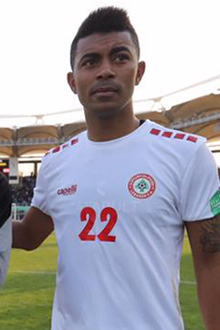
El Dor with the Lebanon national team in 2022

El Dor represented all Lebanon youth national teams, playing four times for the under-16 team at the 2010 AFC Championship qualification, four times for the under-19 team at the 2012 AFC Championship qualification, and twice for the under-23 team at the 2016 AFC Championship qualification. He was also called up to the Lebanon national under-20 team for the 2013 Jeux de la Francophonie.

El Dor was first called up to the Lebanon national team in November 2014, as part of a mixed squad of senior and Olympic players for a friendly match against the United Arab Emirates. On 12 October 2021, El Dor made his senior debut as a second-half substitute in a 3–2 win against Syria, in the third round of qualification for the 2022 FIFA World Cup.

== Personal life ==
Growing up, El Dor's idol was Thierry Henry, while his favorite compatriot player is Lebanese national team captain Hassan Maatouk. He also admires Saudi player Fahad Al-Muwallad, who he faced while playing for the Lebanon national under-23 team. While playing in India, El Dor stated that Nigerian player Kalu Uche was the toughest player he had ever faced.

In 2015, El Dor represented Lebanon for the second season of the reality show The Victorious. Through 12 episodes, the Lebanese player was the overall runner-up. He was trained and evaluated by former football stars such as Michel Salgado, Alessandro Del Piero, Ronaldinho, Thierry Henry and Edgar Davids.

== Career statistics ==
=== International ===
As of match played 29 March 2022

Appearances and goals by national team and year
National team	Year	Apps	Goals
Lebanon	2021	4	0
Lebanon	2022	1	0
Total		5	0

== Honours ==
Ahed

- Lebanese Elite Cup: 2013

New Radiant

- Dhivehi Premier League: 2017
- Maldives FA Cup: 2017
- President's Cup: 2017

Ansar

- Lebanese Premier League: 2020–21
- Lebanese FA Cup: 2020–21; runner-up: 2021–22
- Lebanese Super Cup: 2021

== See also ==
- List of Lebanon international footballers born outside Lebanon
