= Hussein Awada =

Hussein Awada may refer to:

- Hussein Awada (footballer, born 1990), Lebanese association football forward
- Hussein Awada (footballer, born 2000), Lebanese association football midfielder
