= Ali Alaaeddine =

Lebanese footballer (born 1993)

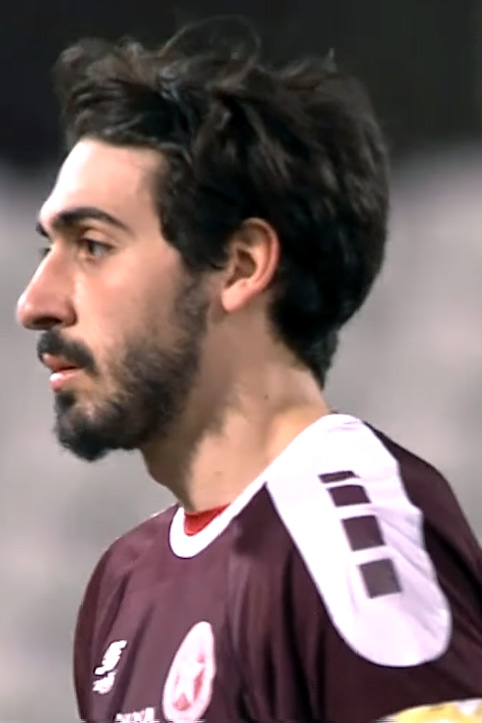
- Alaaeddine with Nejmeh in 2019

Personal information
- Full name: Ali Salman Alaaeddine
- Date of birth: 8 September 1993 (age 33)
- Place of birth: Kuwait City, Kuwait
- Height: 1.89 m (6 ft 2 in)
- Position: Forward

Team information
- Current team: Sulaibikhat

Youth career
- 2009–2015: Al-Arabi

Senior career*
Years	Team	Apps	(Gls)
2015–2017	Al-Arabi	0	(0)
2015–2017	→ Al-Sahel (loan)		
2017–2023	Nejmeh	70	(18)
2023–2024	Ansar	11	(0)
2024–2025	Al-Fahaheel	2	(0)
2025–	Sulaibikhat		

International career
2019	Lebanon	1	(0)
- * Club domestic league appearances and goals as of 20 February 2025

Ali Salman Alaaeddine (Arabic: علي سلمان علاء الدين, Lebanese Arabic pronunciation: [ˈʕali salˈmeːn ʕaˈlæːʔ‿dˈdiːn]; born 8 September 1993) is a footballer who plays as a forward for Kuwaiti club Sulaibikhat. Born in Kuwait, he has played for the Lebanon national team.

Coming through the youth system, Alaaeddine made his senior debut with Al-Arabi in Kuwait in 2015. After a loan period at Al-Sahel, he signed for Lebanese club Nejmeh in 2017, with whom he won two Lebanese FA Cups and three Lebanese Elite Cups. Alaaeddine played for Ansar during the 2023–24 season, before returning to Kuwait, first at Al-Fahaheel then at Sulaibikhat. Internationally, he made his only cap for Lebanon at the 2019 WAFF Championship.

== Club career ==
Born in Kuwait, Alaaeddine began his youth career in 2009 with Kuwaiti club Al-Arabi, winning the title of best emerging player, before moving on loan to Al-Sahel in 2015, where he made his senior debut.

On 29 June 2017, Alaaeddine joined Lebanese Premier League side Nejmeh. In June 2020, he renewed his contract with the club until 2022. At the time, he had scored 10 goals in 24 matches for the club. He was noted for his positive performances during the 2021–22 season. Thanks to his goal in the 2021–22 Lebanese FA Cup final, Nejmeh won 2–1 against rivals Ansar and lifted their seventh title.

On 10 July 2023, Alaaeddine signed for Ansar on a free transfer, following the expiration of his contract with Nejmeh.

In the summer of 2024, Alaaeddine returned to Kuwait, joining Al-Fahaheel in the Kuwaiti Premier League. He subsequently joined Sulaibikhat, where he continued his career in Kuwait.

== International career ==
Alaaeddine made his debut for Lebanon on 2 August 2019, in a 2–1 win against Syria at the 2019 WAFF Championship.

== Style of play ==
Mainly a striker, Alaaeddine is also capable of playing as a right winger on occasion.

== Honours ==
Nejmeh

- Lebanese FA Cup: 2021–22, 2022–23; runner-up: 2020–21
- Lebanese Elite Cup: 2017, 2018, 2021
- Lebanese Super Cup runner-up: 2021

Ansar

- Lebanese FA Cup: 2023–24

== See also ==
- List of Lebanon international footballers born outside Lebanon
