= 2021 Lebanese Super Cup =

21st edition of the Lebanese Super Cup

Ansar	Nejmeh
2	2
- Ansar won 5–4 on penalties
- Date: 7 August 2021
- Venue: Fouad Chehab Stadium, Jounieh
- Referee: Ali Reda

The 2021 Lebanese Super Cup was the 21st Lebanese Super Cup, an annual football match played between the winners of the previous season's Lebanese Premier League and Lebanese FA Cup. As Ansar won both competitions in 2021, their opponents were the 2020–21 league runners-up Nejmeh.

The match was played at the Fouad Chehab Stadium on 7 August 2021. Ansar won their sixth title, defeating rivals Nejmeh on penalties, following a 2–2 draw after regular time.

== Match ==
=== Summary ===
Mahdi Zein of Nejmeh opened the scoring in the 39th minute, assisted by Khalil Bader. In the 42nd minute, Nejmeh were close to doubling the lead through a free kick by Khaled Takaji, which was saved by Ansar's goalkeeper Nazih Assaad. In the second half, despite Ansar coming close to scoring the equalizer, Nejmeh made it 2–0 in the 59th minute thanks to Takaji's goal. In the 68th minute, Ahmad Hijazi of Ansar reduced the deficit, scoring a backheel goal via a pass from Hassan Maatouk. Ansar equalized in stoppage time, after Jihad Ayoub scored in the fourth minute of added time. The game went directly to a penalty shoot-out; after Ansar scored all five of their penalties, Nejmeh's fifth penalty, taken by Mohamad Ghaddar, was saved by Assaad: Ansar were crowned Super Cup champions for the sixth time.

=== Details ===
7 August 2021
16:00 UTC+3

Ansar	2–2	Nejmeh
Hijazi 68'; Ayoub 90+4'	Report	Zein 39'; Takaji 59'
Penalties
Maatouk (penalty scored); Ayoub (penalty scored); Tneich (penalty scored); Al Haj (penalty scored); Darwich (penalty scored)	5–4	(penalty scored) Al Saadi; (penalty scored) El Zein; (penalty scored) Kanso; (penalty scored) Kourani; (penalty missed) Ghaddar

Fouad Chehab Stadium, Jounieh
Referee: Ali Reda

Ansar	Nejmeh

GK	91	(Lebanon) Nazih Assaad
DF	3	(Lebanon) Mootaz El Jounaidi (c)		(substituted off) 83'
DF	5	(Lebanon) Nassar Nassar		(substituted off) 83'
DF	27	(Lebanon) Hussein El Dor	(yellow card) 42'
MF	6	(Lebanon) Jihad Ayoub	(yellow card) 23'
MF	7	(Lebanon) Majed Osman		(substituted off) 60'
MF	8	(Lebanon) Youssef Barakat		(substituted off) 70'
FW	9	(Lebanon) Karim Darwich
FW	10	(Lebanon) Hassan Maatouk
FW	24	(Lebanon) Hassan Kaafarani
FW	99	(Lebanon) Ahmad Hijazi
Substitutes:
GK	31	(Lebanon) Hadi Mortada
DF	4	(Lebanon) Anas Abou Saleh
DF	19	(Lebanon) Ahmad Mansour		(substituted in) 83'
DF	21	(Lebanon) Khaled Ali
MF	11	(Lebanon) Youssef Al Haj		(substituted in) 60'
MF	20	(Lebanon) Ali Tneich		(substituted in) 83'
MF	45	(Lebanon) Ahmad Zein El Dinne
MF	77	(Lebanon) Ahmad Hamed
FW	22	(Lebanon) Mahmoud Kojok		(substituted in) 70'
Manager:
(Germany) Robert Jaspert

GK	90	(Lebanon) Ali Hallal
DF	2	(Lebanon) Ali Al Saadi
DF	18	(Lebanon) Kassem El Zein
DF	24	(Lebanon) Maher Sabra
DF	33	(Lebanon) Andrew Sawaya
MF	14	(Lebanon) Hassan Annan	(substituted off) 90+4'
MF	20	(Lebanon) Hassan Kourani
MF	77	(Lebanon) Mahdi Zein	(substituted off) 70'
FW	11	(Lebanon) Khaled Takaji (c)	(substituted off) 70'
FW	17	(Lebanon) Mahmoud Siblini	(substituted off) 90+4'
FW	27	(Lebanon) Khalil Bader	(substituted off) 85'
Substitutes:
GK	71	(Lebanon) Karim Salame
DF	5	(Lebanon) Mostafa Al Shamaa
DF	12	(Lebanon) Abdallah Aich	(substituted in) 90+4'
MF	6	(Lebanon) Hassan Chaito
MF	7	(Lebanon) Mahmoud Kaawar
MF	8	(Lebanon) Moustafa Kanso	(substituted in) 85'
MF	10	(Lebanon) Abbas Ahmad Atwi	(substituted in) 70'
FW	9	(Lebanon) Ali Alaaeddine	(substituted in) 90+4'
FW	22	(Lebanon) Mohamad Ghaddar	(substituted in) 70'
Manager:
(Lebanon) Youssef Al Jawhari

Assistant referees:
Hassan Kanso
Bilal Orfi
Fourth official:
Mohammad Issa
Video assistant referee:
Bahaa Nasr
Assistant video assistant referee:
Mohammad Al Mawla

Match rules

- 90 minutes
- Penalty shoot-out if scores level
- Seven named substitutes, of which five may be used

== See also ==
- Beirut derby
