= 2017–18 Lebanese Premier League =

Lebanese Premier League
- Season: 2017–18
- Champions: Al Ahed
- Relegated: Al Shabab Al Arabi, Al Islah
- AFC Cup: Al Ahed (group stage); Al Nejmeh (Playoff)
- Matches: 132
- Goals: 335 (2.54 per match)
- Top goalscorer: El Hadji Malick Tall (15 goals)
- Biggest home win: Al Ahed 6-0 Al Islah
- Biggest away win: Al Islah 1-6 Al Ahed
- Highest scoring: Salam Zgharta 1-6 Al Nabi Sheet

The 2017–18 Lebanese Premier League, officially known as the Alfa Lebanese Football League (Arabic: دوري ألفا اللبناني لكرة القدم) for sponsorship reasons, was the 57th season of top-tier football in Lebanon. A total of twelve teams competed in the league, with Al Ahed the defending champions. After 21 rounds, Al Ahed won the league for the 6th time in its history.

== Teams ==
Shabab Al-Sahel and Al Egtmaaey Tripoli were relegated to the second level of Lebanese football after ending the 2017–18 season in the bottom two places. They were replaced by Al Shabab Al Arabi and Al Islah Al Bourj Al Shimaly who won promotion from the second tier.

=== Stadia and locations ===
Locations of teams in the 2017–18 Lebanese Premier League
Locations of teams in the 2017–18 Lebanese Premier League within Beirut

Club	Location	Stadium	Stadium capacity	Coach
Al Ahed	Beirut	Beirut Municipal Stadium	22,500	(Lebanon) Bassem Marmar
Al Akhaa Al Ahli	Aley	Amin Abdelnour Stadium	3,500	(Iraq) Abdul-Wahab Abu Al-Hail
Al Ansar	Beirut	Beirut Municipal Stadium	22,500	(Lebanon) Sami El Choum
Al Islah Al Bourj Al Shimaly	Tyre	Sour Stadium	22,000	(Lebanon) Khalil Watfa
Al Nejmeh	Beirut	Rafic El-Hariri Stadium	5,000	(Armenia) Armen Sanamyan
Al Nabi Sheet	Al Nabi Sheet	Al-Nabi Shayth Stadium	5,000	(Venezuela) Quique Garcia
Racing Beirut	Beirut	Bourj Hammoud Stadium	8,000	(Lebanon) Roda Antar
Safa	Beirut	Safa Stadium	4,000	(Lebanon) Mohammad Dakka
Salam Zgharta	Zgharta	Zgharta Stadium	5,000	(Tunisia) Maher Essederi
Shabab Al-Arabi	Beirut	Beirut Municipal Stadium	22,500	(Lebanon) Jalal Rodwan
Tadamon Sour	Tyre	Sour Stadium	6,500	(Lebanon) Mohammed Zouheir
Tripoli SC	Tripoli	Tripoli Municipal Stadium	22,000	(Germany) Theo Bücker

== Table ==
Pos	Team	Pld	W	D	L	GF	GA	GD	Pts	Promotion or relegation
1	Al Ahed	22	16	6	0	50	9	+41	54	Qualification to 2019 AFC Cup group stage
2	Al Nejmeh	22	15	2	5	40	22	+18	47	Qualification to 2019 AFC Cup group stage
3	Safa	22	10	6	6	31	25	+6	36	
4	Al Ansar	22	9	6	7	33	24	+9	33	
5	Al-Akhaa Al-Ahli	22	7	12	3	23	19	+4	33	
6	Salam Zgharta	22	9	5	8	30	31	−1	32	
7	Tadamon Sour	22	8	5	9	28	27	+1	29	
8	Tripoli SC	22	6	7	9	28	33	−5	25	
9	Racing Beirut	22	7	4	11	21	29	−8	25	
10	Al Nabi Sheet	22	5	5	12	21	35	−14	20	
11	Al Shabab Al Arabi	22	4	5	13	16	31	−15	17	Relegation to Lebanese Second Division
12	Al Islah	22	2	5	15	14	50	−36	11	Relegation to Lebanese Second Division

Source: FIFA
Rules for classification: 1) Points; 2) Goal difference; 3) Number of goals scored

== Season statistics ==
=== Top goalscorers ===
As of 15 April 2018.

Rank	Player	Club	Goals	Games
1	(Senegal) Elhadji Malick Tall	Ansar	15	22
2	(Lebanon) Hassan Maatouk	Nejmeh	13	21
2	(Lebanon) Hassan Chaito	Ahed	13	22
4	(Ivory Coast) Lorougnon Christ Remi	Tadamon Sour	10	20
5	(Lebanon) Ahmad Hijazi	Akhaa Ahli Aley	9	21
5	(Ivory Coast) Idrissa Kouyaté	Ahed	9	22
7	(Lebanon) Omar Zeineddine	Salam Zgharta	8	18
7	(Mauritania) Mamadou Niass	Salam Zgharta	8	21
9	(Lebanon) Alexis Khazzaka	Akhaa Ahli Aley	7	15
9	(Cameroon) Ernest Thierry Anang	Safa	7	22
11	(Lebanon) Ahmad Zreik	Ahed	6	14
11	(Lebanon) Wasim Abdelhady	Tadamon Sour	6	18
11	(Nigeria) Musa Kabiru	Nejmeh	6	20
11	(Lebanon) Adnan Melhem	Racing Beirut	6	20
