= 2024 Merdeka Tournament =

Pestabola Merdeka 2024

Tournament details
- Host country: Malaysia
- Dates: 4–8 September 2024
- Teams: 4
- Venue: 1 (in 1 host city)

Final positions
- Champions: Malaysia (13th title)
- Runners-up: Lebanon
- Third place: Tajikistan
- Fourth place: Philippines

Tournament statistics
- Matches played: 4
- Goals scored: 5 (1.25 per match)

The 2024 Merdeka Tournament (Malay: Pestabola Merdeka 2024) was the 43rd edition of the tournament organized by Football Association of Malaysia (FAM). The tournament took place on September 4–8, 2024 featuring four participants.

The host nation, Malaysia emerged champion for the record 13th time after defeating Lebanon 1–0 in the final. Defending champions Tajikistan, were defeated by Lebanon in the semi-finals. Tajikistan however managed to salvage a podium finish by winning the third place match against the Philippines via a penalty shootout after regulation time.

== Participating nations ==
Team	FIFA Ranking (Note: The ranking of participating national teams as of 20 June 2024.)	Confederation
Lebanon	117	AFC
Malaysia (Host)	134	AFC
Philippines	147	AFC
Tajikistan	102	AFC

== Venue ==
All matches will be played at the following venue.

Kuala Lumpur
Bukit Jalil National Stadium
Capacity: 87,411
2024 Merdeka Tournament is located in Malaysia

== Knockout stage ==
Semi-finals
4 September – Kuala Lumpur
Lebanon	1
Tajikistan	0
4 September – Kuala Lumpur
Malaysia	2
Philippines	1

Final
8 September – Kuala Lumpur
Lebanon	0
Malaysia	1
Third place
8 September – Kuala Lumpur
Tajikistan (p)	0 (4)
Philippines	0 (3)

=== Semi-finals ===
4 September 2024
16:30 UTC+8

Lebanon	1–0	Tajikistan
Ayoub 13'	Report

Bukit Jalil National Stadium, Kuala Lumpur
Attendance: 460
Referee: Mohamad Kamil Zakaria Bin Ismail (Malaysia)
4 September 2024
21:00 UTC+8

Malaysia	2–1	Philippines
Syamer 43'; Safawi 73' (pen.)	Report	J. Tabinas 27'

Bukit Jalil National Stadium, Kuala Lumpur
Attendance: 15,800
Referee: Yudi Nurcahya (Indonesia)

=== Third place ===
8 September 2024
16:30 UTC+8

Tajikistan	0–0	Philippines
	Report
Penalties
Nazarov (penalty scored); Umarbayev (penalty missed); Sharipov (penalty scored); Safarov (penalty scored); Shukurov (penalty scored)	4–3	(penalty missed) J. Tabinas; (penalty missed) Gayoso; (penalty scored) P. Tabinas; (penalty scored) Monis; (penalty scored) Rontini

Bukit Jalil National Stadium, Kuala Lumpur
Referee: Razlan Joffri Ali (Malaysia)

=== Final ===
8 September 2024
21:00 UTC+8

Malaysia	1–0	Lebanon
Morales 33'	Report

Bukit Jalil National Stadium, Kuala Lumpur
Attendance: 10,000
Referee: Thoriq Alkatiri (Indonesia)

== Winners ==
2024 Merdeka Tournament winner

Malaysia
13th title

== Goalscorers ==
There were 5 goals scored in 4 matches, for an average of 1.25 goals per match.

1 goal

- (Lebanon) Jihad Ayoub
- (Malaysia) Romel Morales
- (Malaysia) Safawi Rasid
- (Malaysia) Syamer Kutty Abba
- (Philippines) Jefferson Tabinas
