= Hassan Kourani =

Lebanese footballer (born 1995)

- Kourani with Nejmeh in 2021

Personal information
- Full name: Hassan Mohamad Kourani
- Date of birth: 22 January 1995 (age 31)
- Place of birth: Yater, Lebanon
- Position: Attacking midfielder

Team information
- Current team: Nejmeh
- Number: 20

Youth career
- Shabab Sahel

Senior career*
Years	Team	Apps	(Gls)
2013–2020	Shabab Sahel	90	(8)
2017–2018	→ Tripoli (loan)	18	(2)
2020–	Nejmeh	101	(12)
2025	→ Al-Shabab (loan)	5	(0)

International career^{‡}
2013	Lebanon U20	3	(0)
2015–2017	Lebanon U23	4	(2)
2022–2025	Lebanon	12	(1)
- * Club domestic league appearances and goals as of 10:17, 3 August 2026 (UTC) ‡ National team caps and goals as of 20 March 2025

Hassan Mohamad Kourani (Arabic: حسن محمد كوراني; born 22 January 1995) is a Lebanese professional footballer who plays as an attacking midfielder for Lebanese Premier League club Nejmeh.

== Club career ==
Kourani made his debut for Shabab Sahel under coach Jamal Taha in the 2013–14 Lebanese Premier League season. With six games in the league, Kourani was awarded the Lebanese Young Player of the Year award. On 18 August 2017, Tripoli announced the signing of Kourani on a one-year loan. In May 2020, Kourani's contract with Shabab Sahel expired.

On 15 July 2020, Kourani joined Nejmeh on a two-year contract. In May 2022, he renewed his expiring contract a further three years. In January 2025, he moved to Al-Shabab in Oman on a five-month contract. Kourani returned to Nejmeh in August 2025, ahead of the 2025–26 season.

== International career ==
Kourani was first called up to the Lebanon national team in November 2014, as part of a mixed squad of senior and Olympic players for a friendly match against the United Arab Emirates. He made his debut for the Lebanon national team on 19 November 2022, as a substitute in a 2–0 friendly defeat to Kuwait in Dubai, United Arab Emirates. His first goal came on 9 June 2023, in a 3–1 win against Vanuatu in the 2023 Intercontinental Cup.

== Career statistics ==
=== International ===
As of match played 20 March 2025

Appearances and goals by national team and year
National team	Year	Apps	Goals
Lebanon	2022	1	0
Lebanon	2023	8	1
Lebanon	2024	2	0
Lebanon	2025	1	0
Total		12	1

Scores and results list Lebanon's goal tally first, score column indicates score after each Kourani goal.

List of international goals scored by Hassan Kourani
No.	Date	Venue	Opponent	Score	Result	Competition	Ref.
1	9 June 2023	Kalinga Stadium, Bhubaneswar, India	Vanuatu	2–1	3–1	2023 Intercontinental Cup	

== Honours ==
Shabab Sahel

- Lebanese Elite Cup: 2019
- Lebanese Challenge Cup: 2014, 2015

Nejmeh

- Lebanese Premier League: 2023–24
- Lebanese FA Cup: 2021–22, 2022–23, 2025–26
- Lebanese Elite Cup: 2021
- Lebanese Super Cup: 2023, 2024

Individual

- Lebanese Premier League Best Young Player: 2013–14
