= Nabi Chit Stadium =

Stadium in Lebanon

- ملعب النبي شيت
- Interactive map of Nabi Chit Stadium
- Address: Al-Nabi Shayth, Lebanon
- Coordinates: 33.865467°N 36.094070°E
- Capacity: 5,000

Tenant
- Shabab Baalbeck

Nabi Chit Stadium (Arabic: ملعب النبي شيت) is a 5,000 capacity multi-purpose stadium in Al-Nabi Shayth, Lebanon. It is currently used mostly for football matches.
