= Ali Markabawi =

Lebanese footballer (born 2000)

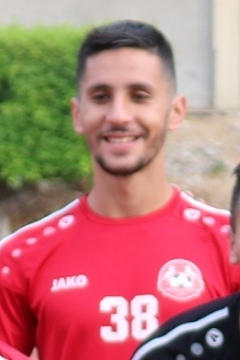
- Markabawi for Akhaa Ahli Aley in 2020

Personal information
- Full name: Ali Nasser Markabawi
- Date of birth: 19 December 2000 (age 25)
- Place of birth: Halba, Lebanon
- Position: Striker

Youth career
- –2019: Ahed

Senior career*
Years	Team	Apps	(Gls)
2019–2021	Akhaa Ahli Aley	18	(0)
2021–2024	Bourj	34	(1)
2024–2026	Safa	3	(0)
2025–2026	→ Racing Beirut (loan)	6	(0)

International career^{‡}
2021	Lebanon U23		
2023	Lebanon	6	(0)
- * Club domestic league appearances and goals as of 21 June 2026 ‡ National team caps and goals as of 1 July 2023

Ali Nasser Markabawi (Arabic: علي ناصر مرقباوي; born 19 December 2000) is a Lebanese footballer who plays as a striker.

== Club career ==
A youth player for Ahed, Markabawi joined Akhaa Ahli Aley's senior team in July 2019, ahead of the 2019–20 Lebanese Premier League season. After two years, in May 2021, he moved to Bourj for the 2021–22 season.

== International career ==
In June 2021, Markabawi was called up to play for Lebanon U23 in two friendly games against the United Arab Emirates U23.

Markabawi made his senior international debut on 9 June 2023, in a 2023 Intercontinental Cup game against Vanuatu.

== Career statistics ==
=== International ===
As of match played 1 July 2023

Appearances and goals by national team and year
National team	Year	Apps	Goals
Lebanon	2023	6	0
Total		6	0
