= Houssem Louati =

Tunisian footballer (born 1992)

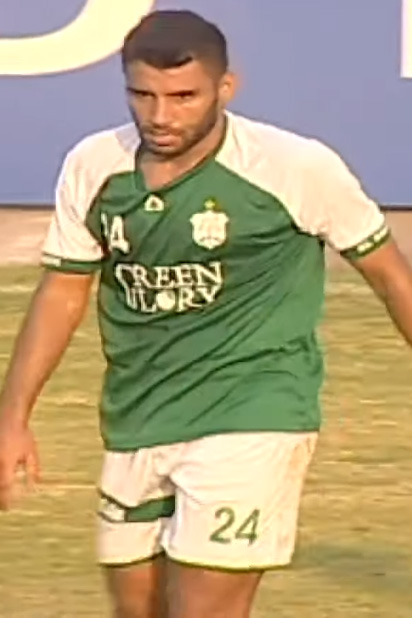
- Louati with Ansar in 2019

Personal information
- Full name: Houssem Louati
- Date of birth: 12 May 1992 (age 34)
- Place of birth: Sfax, Tunisia
- Height: 1.75 m (5 ft 9 in)
- Position: Attacking midfielder

Youth career
- –2011: CS Sfaxien

Senior career*
| Years | Team | Apps | (Gls) |
| 2011–2018 | CS Sfaxien | 69 | (5) |
| 2018–2020 | Ansar | 24 | (6) |
| 2020–2021 | Al-Riyadh | | (6) |
| 2021–2022 | US Tataouine | 14 | (4) |
| 2022–2023 | Ansar | 21 | (4) |
| 2023–2024 | Bourj | 22 | (2) |
| 2024–2025 | Safa | 9 | (1) |
- * Club domestic league appearances and goals as of 15:21, 4 October 2025 (UTC)

Houssem Louati (Arabic: حسام اللواتي; born 12 May 1992) is a Tunisian professional footballer who plays as an attacking midfielder.

== Career ==
On 16 September 2020, Louati moved to Saudi Second Division side Al-Riyadh on a one-year contract; he reunited with former Ansar teammate El Hadji Malick Tall. Louati scored six goals during the 2020–21 season. After returning to Tunisia, where he played for US Tataouine during the 2021–22 Tunisian Ligue Professionnelle 1, Louati moved back to Ansar in July 2022. In April 2023, he moved to Bourj.

In June 2024, it was announced that Louati would remain for two more years in the Lebanese league, this time with Safa.

== Honours ==
Ansar

- Lebanese Elite Cup runner-up: 2022

Individual

- Lebanese Premier League Team of the Season: 2018–19
- Lebanese Premier League top assist provider: 2018–19
