= 2014–15 Lebanese Premier League =

Lebanese Premier League
- Season: 2014–15
- Champions: Al Ahed
- Relegated: Tadamon Sour; Al Akhaa Al Ahli

The 2014–15 Lebanese Premier League, officially known as the Alfa Lebanese Football League (Arabic: دوري ألفا اللبناني لكرة القدم) for sponsorship reasons, was the 54th season of top-tier football in Lebanon. A total of twelve teams are competing in the league, with Al Nejmeh the defending champions. The season kicked off on 26 September 2014 and will finish around June 2015.

Al Ahed won the league, while Tadamon Sour and Al-Akhaa Al-Ahli Aley were relegated to the second tier.

== Teams ==
Al-Mabarrah and Al Egtmaaey Tripoli were relegated to the second level of Lebanese football after ending the 2013–14 season in the bottom two places. They were replaced by Nabi Sheet and Shabab Al-Ghazieh. Shabab Al-Ghazieh return after one season away whilst Nabi Sheet enter for the first time

=== Stadia and locations ===
Locations of teams in the 2014–15 Lebanese Premier League

| Club | Location | Stadium | Stadium capacity | Coach |
|---|---|---|---|---|
| Al Ahed | Beirut | Beirut Municipal Stadium | 22,500 | (Lebanon) Mohammad Hammoud |
| Al Akhaa Al Ahli | Aley | Amin Abdelnour Stadium | 3,500 | (Syria) Hussein Afash |
| Al Ansar | Beirut | Beirut Municipal Stadium | 22,500 | (France) Richard Tardy |
| Al Nejmeh | Beirut | Rafic El-Hariri Stadium | 5,000 | (Germany) Theo Bucker |
| Al Nabi Sheet | Zahlé | Al-Nabi Shayth Stadium | 5,000 | (Lebanon) Mohammed Al-Dekka |
| Racing Beirut | Beirut | Bourj Hammoud Stadium | 8,000 | (Lebanon) Moussa Hojeij |
| Safa | Beirut | Safa Stadium | 4,000 | (Turkey) Can Vanli |
| Salam Zgharta | Zgharta | Zgharta Stadium | 5,000 | (Netherlands) Peter Meindertesma |
| Shabab Al-Sahel | Beirut | Beirut Municipal Stadium | 22,500 | (Czech Republic) Libor Pala |
| Shabab Al-Ghazieh | Sidon | Saida Municipal Stadium | 22,600 | (Lebanon) Malek Hassoun |
| Tadamon Sour | Tyre | Sour Stadium | 6,500 | (Lebanon) Zouheir Mohammed |
| Tripoli SC | Tripoli | Tripoli Municipal Stadium | 22,000 | (Palestine) Ismael Qurtam |

== Table ==
=== League table ===
| Pos | Team | Pld | W | D | L | GF | GA | GD | Pts | Promotion, qualification or relegation |
|---|---|---|---|---|---|---|---|---|---|---|
| 1 | Al Ahed (C) | 22 | 16 | 3 | 3 | 42 | 10 | +32 | 51 | Qualification to 2016 AFC Champions League preliminary round |
| 2 | Al Ansar | 22 | 13 | 4 | 5 | 31 | 19 | +12 | 43 | |
| 3 | Al Nejmeh | 22 | 11 | 6 | 5 | 26 | 18 | +8 | 39 | |
| 4 | Tripoli SC | 22 | 10 | 3 | 9 | 36 | 24 | +12 | 33 | Qualification to 2016 AFC Cup Play-off round |
| 5 | Safa | 22 | 8 | 6 | 8 | 26 | 28 | −2 | 30 | |
| 6 | Al Nabi Sheet | 22 | 8 | 6 | 8 | 30 | 36 | −6 | 30 | |
| 7 | Salam Zgharta | 22 | 7 | 6 | 9 | 32 | 40 | −8 | 27 | |
| 8 | Shabab Al-Sahel | 22 | 7 | 3 | 12 | 25 | 28 | −3 | 24 | |
| 9 | Shabab Al-Ghazieh | 22 | 6 | 6 | 10 | 29 | 38 | −9 | 24 | |
| 10 | Racing Beirut | 22 | 6 | 5 | 11 | 18 | 30 | −12 | 23 | |
| 11 | Tadamon Sour (R) | 22 | 5 | 7 | 10 | 17 | 30 | −13 | 22 | Relegation to Lebanese Second Division |
| 12 | Al Akhaa Al Ahli (R) | 22 | 5 | 5 | 12 | 18 | 29 | −11 | 20 | Relegation to Lebanese Second Division |

Updated to match(es) played on 22 May 2015. Source: FIFA
Rules for classification: 1) Points; 2) Goal difference; 3) Number of goals scored
(C) Champions; (R) Relegated
