= Beirut derby (football) =

Rivalry between Ansar and Nejmeh

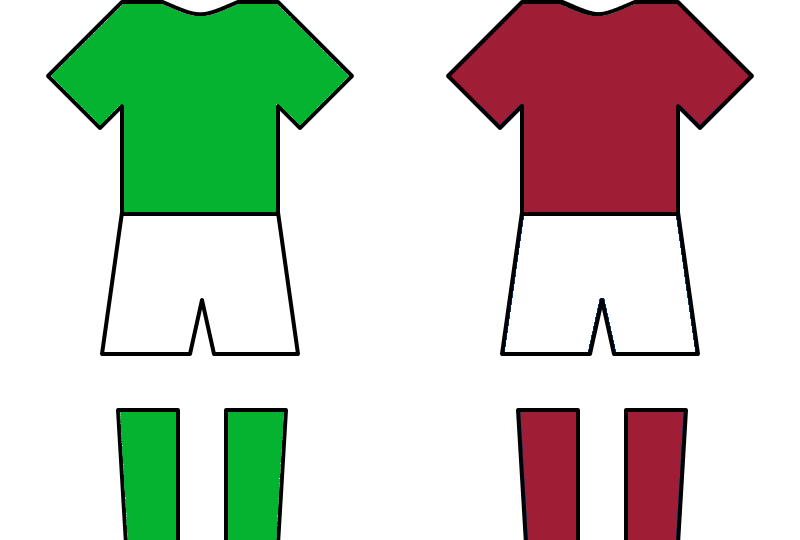
- Team kits – Ansar in green, Nejmeh in burgundy
- Other names: Lebanese Clásico
- Location: Beirut, Lebanon
- Teams: Ansar; Nejmeh
- First meeting: Nejmeh 2–0 Ansar; Lebanese FA Cup (21 June 1964)
- Latest meeting: Nejmeh 1–2 Ansar; Lebanese Premier League (2 August 2026)
- Stadiums: Various (neutral) (Note: Various stadiums across Lebanon have hosted the Beirut derby, namely the Camille Chamoun Sports City Stadium, Tripoli Municipal Stadium, and Saida Municipal Stadium, among others.)

Statistics
- Total meetings: League matches: 87; Cup matches: 41; Total matches: 128
- Most wins: League matches: Ansar (30); Cup matches: Ansar (16); Total matches: Ansar (46)
- Top scorer: Elhadji Malick Tall (22)
- Largest victory: Nejmeh 1–6 Ansar; Lebanese Premier League (8 July 2025)

The Beirut derby (Arabic: ديربي بيروت) is the name given in football to any match between cross-city rivals Ansar and Nejmeh.

The derby has historically been the most anticipated game in Lebanon: both located in Beirut, Nejmeh and Ansar have shared the majority of Lebanese Premier League titles. Ansar holds 16 league titles, the most in the country, and Nejmeh have won nine, the second most. Ansar leads the head-to-head results in competitive matches with 46 wins to Nejmeh's 41.

== History ==
Nejmeh and Ansar were both formed in the post-World War II period. Nejmeh, Arabic for "Star", were founded in 1945 in Beirut, shortly after the independence of Lebanon. Ansar, Arabic for "the supporters", were established in 1951 outside Beirut, because the Lebanese capital already had one sports club per 10,000 inhabitants, as designated by the authorities; thus, the club set up in Mount Lebanon to the south of the city. In 1965, as Beirut’s population grew, they switched bases to the capital, establishing a rivalry between the burgundy of Nejmeh and the green of Ansar.

The Beirut Municipal Stadium played host to the inaugural Lebanese Premier League derby game between Nejmeh and Ansar on 8 December 1968, during the first leg of the 1968–69 season. The match was won by Nejmeh 2–1. Saadeddine Berjawi scored the derby's first goal in the 10th minute for Nejmeh, with Ansar's Abdullah Tabash drawing the score in the 23rd minute. Ali Safa scored the winning goal for Nejmeh in the 80th minute. The game was led by the referee Krikor Tchinian.

In the 1997–98 season, the Beirut Municipal Stadium hosted an important derby, with Ansar two points ahead of Nejmeh at the top of the league table. A crowd of 22,000 made their way to the stadium from the early hours of the morning and thousands more gathered outside after tickets were sold out. Ansar won the encounter 4–2, and went on to win their ninth consecutive league title.

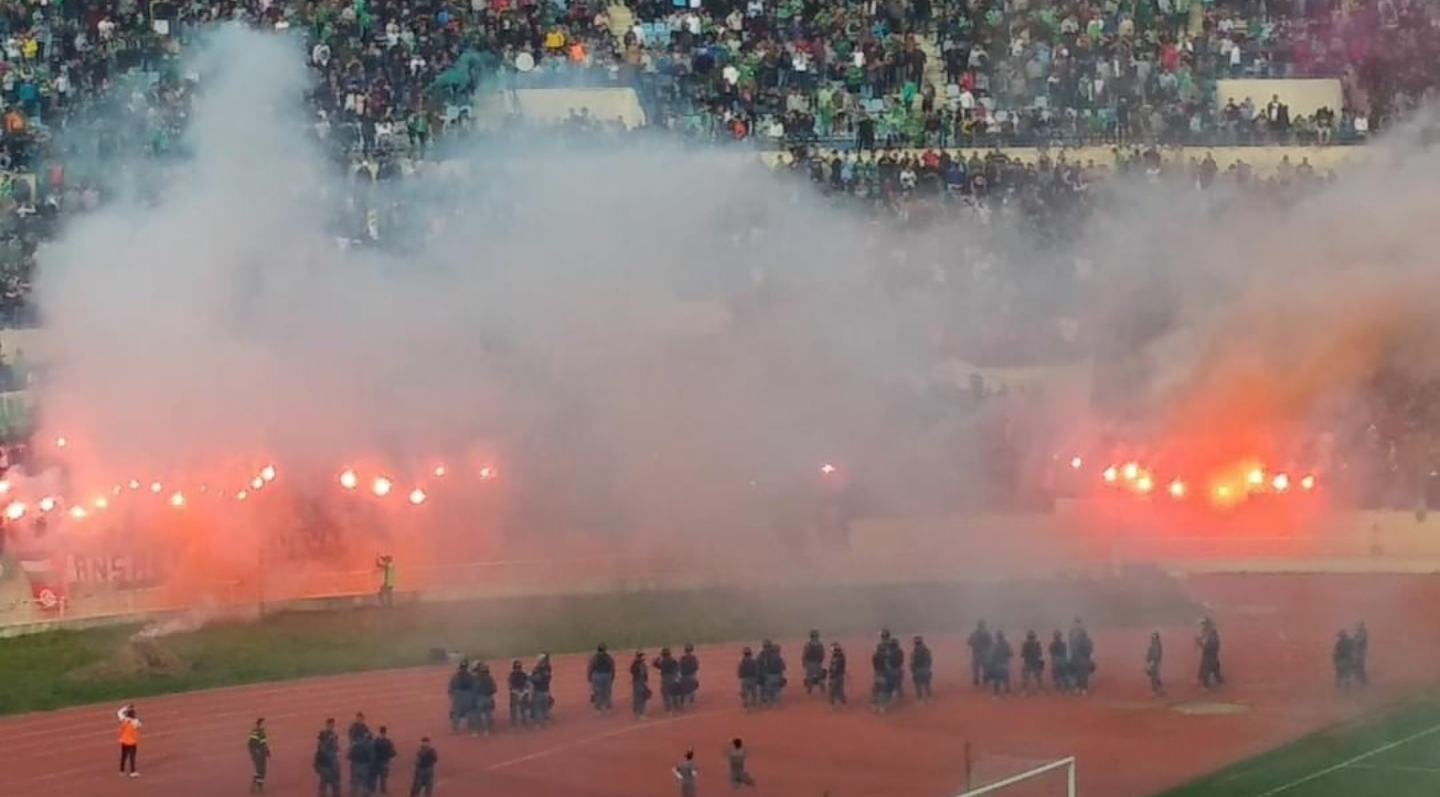
Ansar fans at the Camille Chamoun Sports City Stadium during a Beirut derby in 2018

On 24 April 2021, the Beirut derby was once again decisive for the fate of the title, as both sides were leading the table, with Ansar having a two-point advantage over Nejmeh. The game, which was played at the Fouad Chehab Stadium in Jounieh, saw Ansar win 2–1 and win the title, in a match that saw nine yellow cards being issued. The two teams had already played each other in the last matchday of the season three times in decisive title-deciding games, in 2005, 2006, and 2008, all ending in draws. Ansar won their first league title since 2007, and their 14th overall, a domestic record. Over 15,000 Ansar fans gathered in front of the Beirut Municipal Stadium to celebrate their team's victory, despite there being preventive measures in place to combat the ongoing COVID-19 pandemic.

Similarly to 2021, the 2025–26 league title was also decided in the last matchday: Ansar won 2–1 against Nejmeh on 2 August 2026, and lifted their 16th league title.

== Statistics ==
As of match played 2 August 2026

Competition	Matches	Wins		Draws	Goals	
Competition	Matches	ANS	NEJ	Draws	ANS	NEJ
Lebanese Premier League	87	30	26	31	102	89
Lebanese FA Cup	18	10	7	1	29	21
Lebanese Elite Cup	17	4	7	6	20	25
Lebanese Super Cup	5	2	1	2	9	8
National Solidarity Tournament	1	0	0	1	2	2
Total	128	46	41	41	162	145

== Records ==
=== Biggest wins ===
GD	Result	Date	Competition
5	Nejmeh 1–6 **Ansar**	8 July 2025	Lebanese Premier League
4	**Nejmeh** 4–0 Ansar	22 March 1970	Lebanese Premier League
4	**Ansar** 4–0 Nejmeh	24 April 2002	Lebanese FA Cup
4	**Nejmeh** 6–2 Ansar	30 September 2004	Lebanese Elite Cup
4	Nejmeh 1–5 **Ansar**	2 October 2017	Lebanese Premier League
4	Nejmeh 1–5 **Ansar**	8 December 2023	Lebanese Premier League

=== Goalscoring ===
==== Top goalscorers ====
- Players in **bold** are still active for Ansar or Nejmeh.

Player	Club	League	FA Cup	Elite Cup	Super Cup	Solidarity	Total
(Senegal) **Elhadji Malick Tall**	Ansar	16	3	2	0	1	22
(Lebanon) Moussa Hojeij	Nejmeh	4	2	3	2	0	11
(Lebanon) Khaled Takaji	Nejmeh / Ansar	7	0	1	1	0	9
(Lebanon) Ali Nasseredine	Nejmeh / Ansar	6	1	1	0	0	8
(Trinidad and Tobago) Peter Prosper	Ansar	3	2	2	0	0	7
(Lebanon) Hassan Maatouk	Nejmeh / Ansar	4	1	2	0	0	7
(Lebanon) Fadi Ghosn	Ansar	4	3	0	0	0	7
(Trinidad and Tobago) Errol McFarlane	Nejmeh	4	3	0	0	0	7
(Lebanon) **Nader Matar**	Nejmeh / Ansar	4	1	1	0	0	6
(Lebanon) Mohamad Ghaddar	Nejmeh	4	1	1	0	0	6
(Lebanon) Fadi Alloush	Ansar	5	1	0	0	0	6

==== Consecutive goalscoring ====
- Players in **bold** are still active for Ansar or Nejmeh.

Player	Club	Consecutive matches	Total goals in the run
(Senegal) Elhadji Malick Tall	Ansar	7	11
(Lebanon) Khaled Takaji	Nejmeh	4	4
(Lebanon) Jamal Daher	Ansar	3	4
(Lebanon) Fadi Ghosson	Ansar	3	3

==== Most hauls (4 goals) ====
- One player has scored a haul (4 goals in a game): Elhadji Malick Tall (Ansar).

==== Most hat-tricks (3 goals) ====
- Three players have scored a hat-trick (3 goals in a game): Salah Rushdy (Nejmeh), Errol McFarlane (Nejmeh), and Hichem Houssam Eddine (Ansar).

== Honours ==
The rivalry reflected in Beirut derby matches comes about as Ansar and Nejmeh are the most successful football clubs in Lebanon. Ansar leads Nejmeh 43 to 38 in terms of official overall trophies.

Ansar	Competition	Nejmeh
16	Lebanese Premier League	9
16	Lebanese FA Cup	9
2	Lebanese Federation Cup	0
6	Lebanese Super Cup	8
1	National Solidarity Tournament	0
2	Lebanese Elite Cup (defunct)	12
43	Aggregate	38

== See also ==
- List of association football rivalries
- Football in Lebanon
- Nationalism and sport
- Religion in football
- Beirut derby (basketball)
