= Amin Abdelnour Stadium =

Stadium in Bhamdoun, Lebanon

- ملعب أمين عبد النور الدولي
- Bhamdoun Municipal Stadium
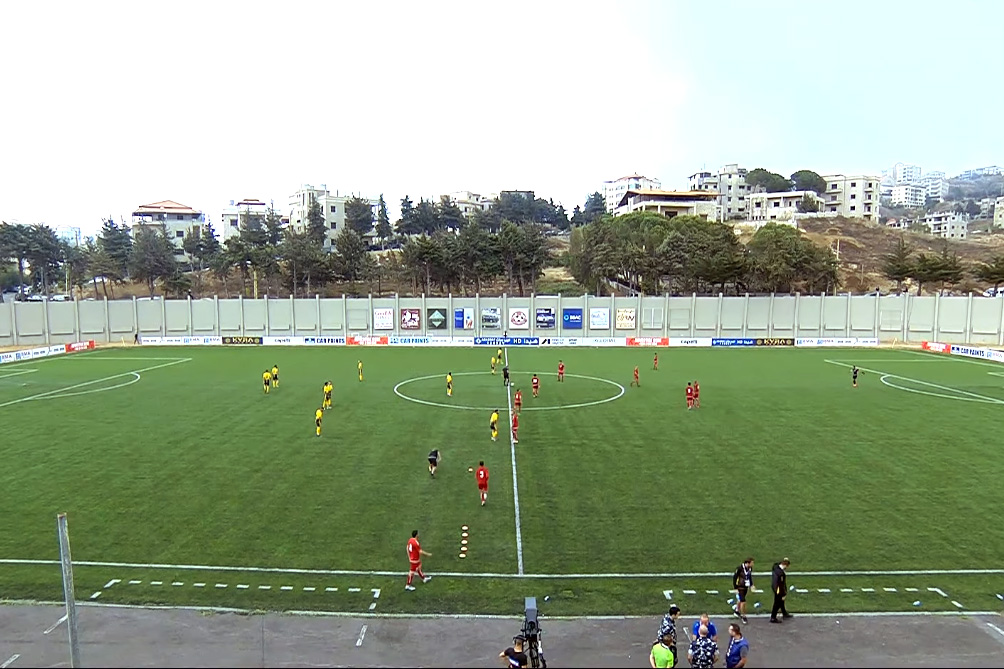
- Amin Abdelnour Stadium in 2019
- Interactive map of Amin Abdelnour Stadium
- Coordinates: 33.803102°N 35.655715°E
- Owner: Lebanese Government
- Operator: Lebanese Government
- Capacity: 3,500
- Surface: Artificial

Construction
- Renovated: 2018

Tenant
- Akhaa Ahli Aley

Amin Abdelnour Stadium (Arabic: ملعب أمين عبد النور الدولي), also known as Bhamdoun Municipal Stadium (Arabic: ملعب بحمدون البلدي), is a football field located in Bhamdoun, Lebanon. With a total capacity of 3,500, it is the home stadium of Akhaa Ahli Aley.
