= Shabab Baalbek SC =

Association football club in Lebanon

Shabab Baalbek
- Full name: Shabab Baalbek Sport Club
- Founded: 1986; 40 years ago (as Al Nabi Chit Sport Club)
- Ground: Baalbek Municipal Stadium; Nabi Chit Stadium
- Capacity: 5,000
- Chairman: Rakan Dika
- Manager: Hasan Mashhour "Mido"
- League: Lebanese Second Division
- 2025–26: Lebanese Second Division, 9th of 12

Shabab Baalbek Sport Club (Arabic: نادي تجمع شباب بعلبك الرياضي) is a football club based in Baalbek, Lebanon, that competes in the Lebanese Second Division Founded in 1986 as Nabi Chit Sport Club (Arabic: نادي النبي شيت الرياضي), the club was known as Bekaa Sport Club (Arabic: نادي البقاع الرياضي) between 2018 and 2020, and is primarily supported by the Shia Muslim community.

== History ==
Nabi Chit Sport Club first played in the Lebanese Premier League in the 2014–15 season, after winning Group B of the 2013–14 Lebanese Second Division: they became the first team to represent the Beqaa Governorate in the first division. In 2018, the club changed their name to Bekaa SC; they were relegated back to the Second Division in 2019. In 2020, they changed their name back to Nabi Chit SC.

The club changed its name to Shabab Baalbek SC on 7 June 2022. They were promoted to the first division for the first time, as Shabab Baalbek, after finishing second in the 2023–24 Lebanese Second Division season.

== Current squad ==
As of 23 September 2024

Note: Flags indicate national team as defined under FIFA eligibility rules; some limited exceptions apply. Players may hold more than one non-FIFA nationality.

No.	Pos.	Nation	Player
1	GK	LBN	Ali Hajj Hassan
2	DF	LBN	Ali Moussa Hazimeh
4	DF	SLE	Suleiman Keita
5	DF	LBN	Ismael Fakhreddine
6	MF	LBN	Yasser Dimashk
7	MF	LBN	Hussein Outa (captain)
8	DF	LBN	Hassan Mallah
9	FW	LBN	Hadi Faitarouni
10	FW	LBN	Hussein Ghanem
11	FW	LBN	Ibrahim Abou Hamdan
14	DF	LBN	Mohammad Kheireddine

No.	Pos.	Nation	Player
15	MF	GUI	Ibrahima Sauma
19	FW	NGA	Collins Anigbo
20	MF	LBN	Mohammad Chokor
21	FW	LBN	Mohammad Al Jammal
22	DF	LBN	Mohammad El-Moussa
23	DF	LBN	Hamza Hassan
31	GK	LBN	Youssef Jishi
77	FW	LBN	Hikmat Zein
80	MF	LBN	Ahmad Hamed
90	FW	SLE	Ibrahim Kamara
99	MF	LBN	Mohammad Mouma

== Honours ==
- Lebanese Second Division
  - Winners (1): 2013–14 (Group B) (Note: As Nabi Chit)
  - Runners-up (1): 2023–24
- Lebanese Challenge Cup (defunct)
  - Runners-up (1): 2014

== See also ==
- List of football clubs in Lebanon
