= Fouad Chehab Stadium =

Multi-purpose stadium in Jounieh, Lebanon

- ملعب فؤاد شهاب
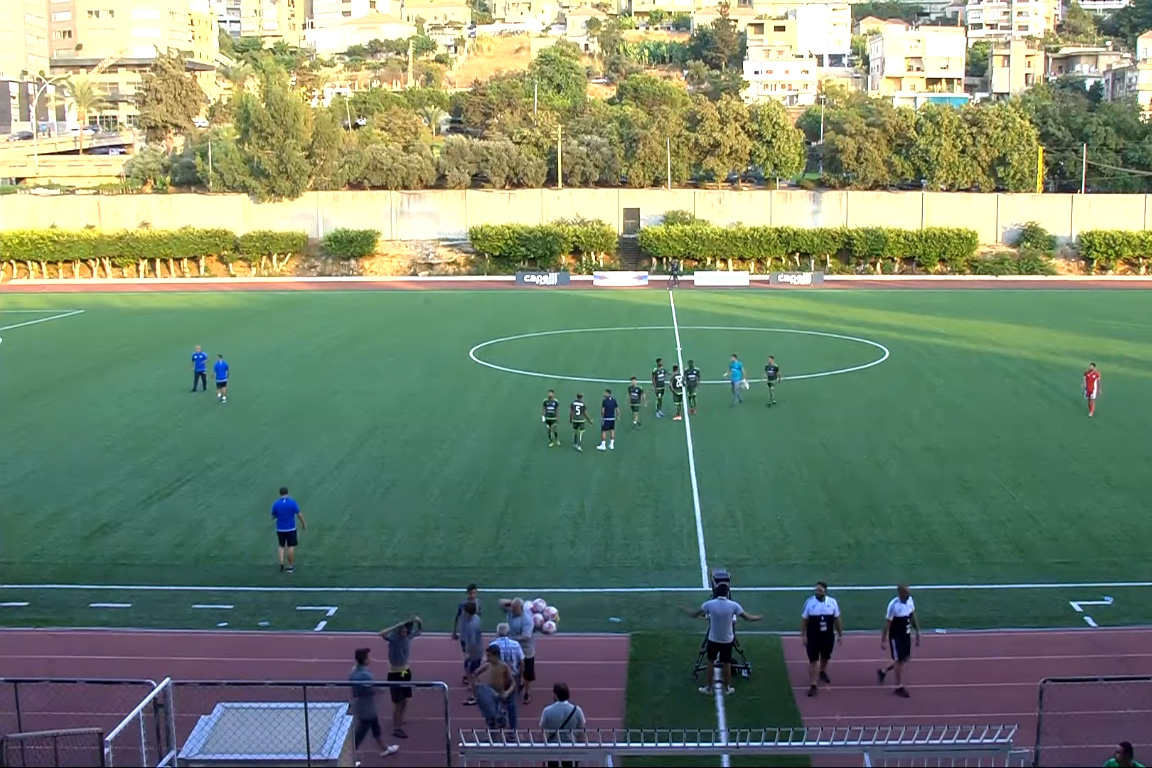
- The stadium on a matchday in 2019
- Interactive map of Fouad Chehab Stadium
- Former names: Jounieh Municipal Stadium (1964–1994)
- Location: Jounieh, Lebanon
- Coordinates: 33°59′15.4″N 35°38′19.1″E
- Owner: Jounieh Municipality
- Operator: Jounieh Municipality
- Capacity: 5,000
- Type: Stadium
- Surface: Artificial turf
- Parking: 2,000

Construction
- Groundbreaking: 1964
- Built: 1959–1964
- Architect: Michel Écochard

Tenant
- Sagesse SC

Fouad Chehab Stadium (Arabic: ملعب فؤاد شهاب), also known as Jounieh Municipal Stadium (Arabic: ملعب جونية البلدي), is a multi-use stadium in Jounieh, Lebanon. It is used mostly for football matches, and has a capacity of 5,000 people.

== History ==
In 1959, president Fouad Chehab commissioned the French architect Michel Écochard to develop a plan for the stadium.

In 1964, the construction of the Jounieh Municipal Stadium was completed, surrounded by an Olympic-sized track and a covered grandstand with a capacity of 7,500 spectators. The complex also included a basketball and volleyball hall, with two stands accommodating 2,000 seated and 3,500 standing spectators.

In 1994, at the initiative of minister Georges Frem, the stadium was renamed Fouad Chebab Stadium in honor of the late president.

The stadium hosted the majority (60%) of 2024–25 Lebanese Premier League matches.
