= Felix Michel Melki =

Association football player (born 1994)

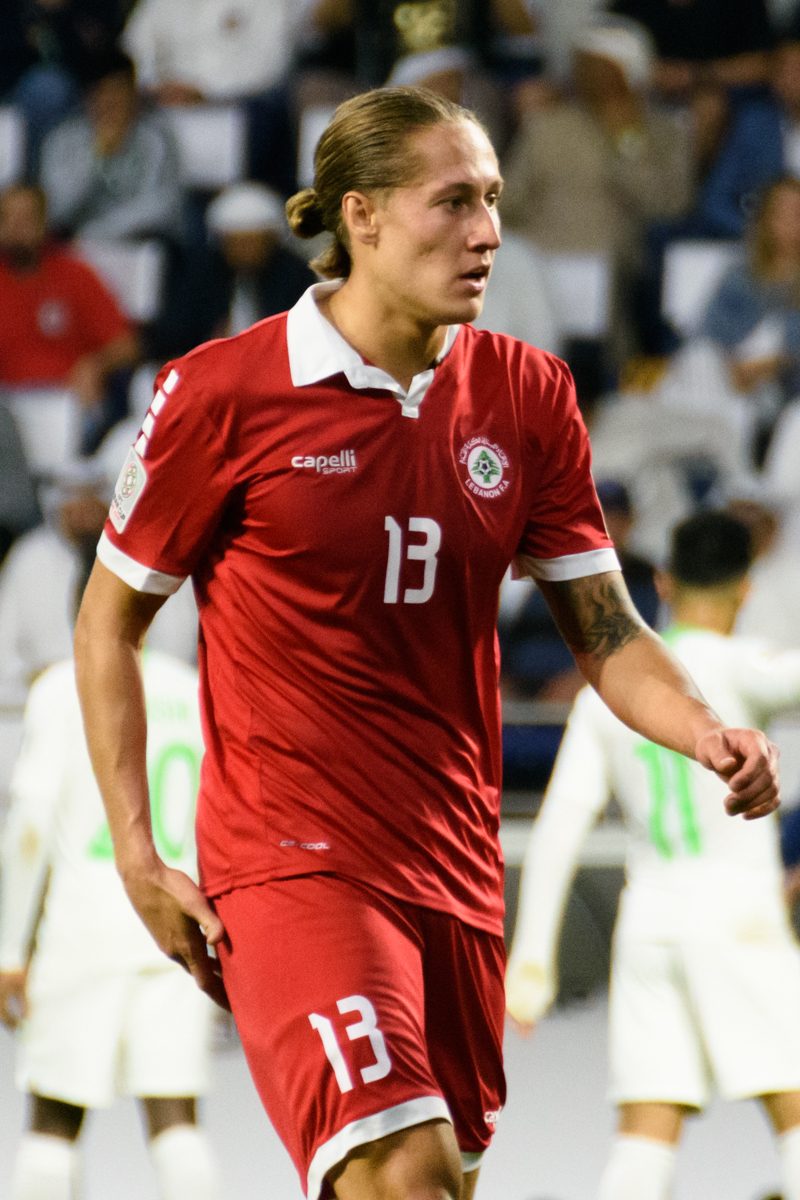
- Michel Melki with Lebanon in 2019

Personal information
- Full name: George Felix Robert Michel Melki
- Date of birth: 23 July 1994 (age 32)
- Place of birth: Södertälje, Sweden
- Height: 1.93 m (6 ft 4 in)
- Positions: Defender; midfielder

Youth career
- 2001–2013: Syrianska FC

Senior career*
Years	Team	Apps	(Gls)
2013–2016	Syrianska FC	21	(1)
2016–2018	Eskişehirspor	10	(1)
2018–2019	AFC Eskilstuna	29	(0)
2019–2022	AIK	16	(0)
2021	→ Sarpsborg 08 (loan)	1	(0)
2021–2022	→ AFC Eskilstuna (loan)	23	(2)
2022	AFC Eskilstuna	13	(0)
2023–2024	Ahed	28	(1)
2024–2025	Safa	25	(5)
2025–2026	Nejmeh	9	(2)

International career^{‡}
2018–2024	Lebanon	33	(1)
- * Club domestic league appearances and goals as of 24 July 2026 ‡ National team caps and goals as of 6 June 2024

George Felix Robert Michel Melki (Arabic: جورج فيليكس روبير ميشيل ملكي, Lebanese Arabic pronunciation: [ʒorʒ feˈli(ː)ks ˈmelki, -ke]; born 23 July 1994), known as Felix Michel Melki, (Note: Known as Felix Michel in Sweden, or George Melki (Arabic: جورج ملكي) in Arabic.) is a professional footballer who plays as a defender or midfielder. Born in Sweden, he has played for the Lebanon national team.

After following his father's tracks playing at Syrianska for three years, Michel Melki moved to Turkish side Eskişehirspor in 2016. In 2018, he moved back to Sweden signing for AFC Eskilstuna and helped them gain promotion back to the Allsvenskan. In 2019 he transferred to Swedish champions AIK, who loaned him out to Sarpsborg 08 in Norway in 2021, before returning to AFC Eskilstuna the same year. In January 2023, Michel Melki moved to Lebanon, playin for Ahed, Safa, and Nejmeh.

Michel Melki made his international debut for Lebanon in 2018, and played in all three group stage games for "the Cedars" at the 2019 AFC Asian Cup; he scored against North Korea and was named Man of the Match.

== Early life ==
Michel Melki was born in Sweden to a Swedish mother, Carina, and an Assyrian father, Robert, who played for Syrianska, a Swedish club founded by Assyrian immigrants. He has an older brother, Alexander, who also plays football.

In an interview with Aftonbladet, Alexander mentioned that despite their Assyrian roots, the two brothers' connection to Lebanon is through their grandfather, George Michel Melki, who lived there before moving to Sweden in 1967 as one of the first refugees from the Middle East to Sweden. Two of their father's sisters were born in Lebanon.

== Club career ==
=== Syrianska ===
At age seven Michel began his football career in the youth team of the Swedish side Syrianska FC, the club of the local Assyrian community. Starting from 2013, he played in the first team and made some sporadic appearances in the league and domestic cup. He only began to establish himself as a starter in the 2016 season, making 10 league appearances.

=== Eskişehirspor ===
In August 2016 he moved to the TFF First League side Eskişehirspor. Michel played 10 league matches for the Turkish club.

=== AFC Eskilstuna ===
In March 2018 Michel signed for Superettan side AFC Eskilstuna, where he would be reunited with his brother Alexander. He made his debut on 24 April, as a 61st-minute substitute in a 2–0 win to Helsingborgs IF. In his first season, he made 21 league appearances and one cup appearance; he helped his side gain promotion to the Allsvenskan through the play-offs.

In the 2019 season, he started in 13 league and cup matches. Michel Melki scored the decisive goal in a penalty shoot-out against AIK, in the semi-finals of the Svenska Cupen on 17 March. He played the whole 90 minutes in the final, where they lost 3–0 to BK Häcken on 30 May.

=== AIK ===
On 25 July 2019, Allsvenskan champions AIK announced the signing of Michel on a three-year deal. He made his league debut on 27 July 2019 as an attacking midfielder, in a 2–0 away win against IK Sirius. On 18 August 2019, Michel was placed as a striker against Kalmar, losing 2–1 at home. With eight league appearances (three as a starter), Michel helped his side reach fourth place in the 2019 Allsvenskan.

In the 2020 season, Michel Melki played all three Svenska Cupen group stage games, helping his side qualify for the quarter-finals. He played 11 games for AIK in 2020, six as a starter. In 2021, Michel Melki played two Svenska Cupen games.

==== Loan to Sarpsborg 08 ====
On 10 May 2021, Michel Melki was loaned out to Norwegian Eliteserien side Sarpsborg 08 until 2 August. He made his debut in the first match of the 2021 season on 16 May, as a second-half substitute in a 0–0 draw against Haugesund. He ended his loan with only one appearance, and returned to AIK.

=== AFC Eskilstuna ===
Michel Melki returned to AFC Eskilstuna in the Superettan on 11 August 2021, joining them on loan until the end of the 2021 season. He made his debut on 14 August, as a 76th-minute substitute in a 4–1 win against Norrby. Michel Melki's first goal came on 22 August, scoring a backheel volley from a corner against GIF Sundsvall; the game ended in a 3–1 defeat.

Following the end of his loan period, AIK re-loaned Michel Melki to AFC Eskilstuna for a further six months on 11 January 2022, until the end of his contract with AIK. On 10 July, he joined AFC Eskilstuna permanently on a contract valid until the end of the 2022 season.

=== Lebanon ===
On 5 January 2023, Michel Melki joined Ahed ahead of the second round of the 2022–23 Lebanese Premier League. He moved to Safa on 11 August 2024. In August 2025, Michel Melki joined Nejmeh ahead of the 2025–26 season. He departed the club in September 2026.

== International career ==
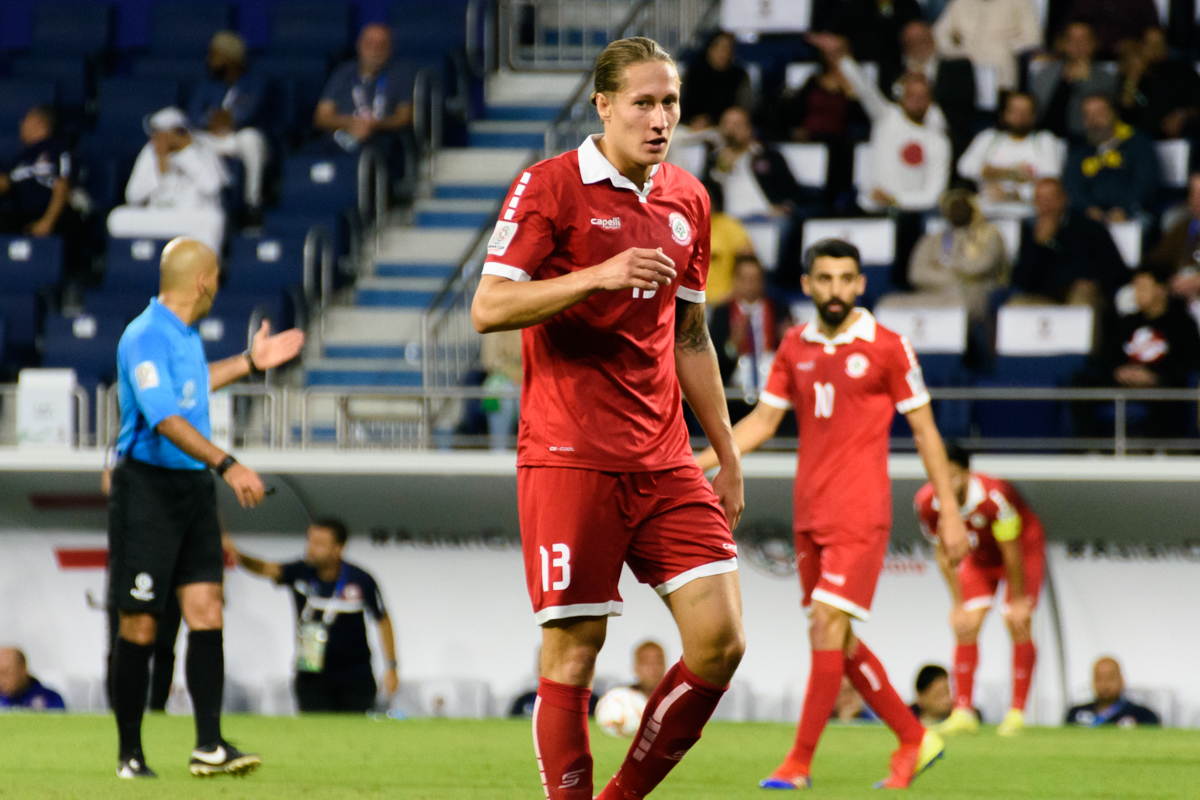
Michel Melki with Lebanon at the 2019 AFC Asian Cup

In 2018, Michel Melki acquired a Lebanese citizenship due to his family's origins being from Lebanon, making him eligible for the Lebanon national team. He made his international debut for Lebanon on 15 November 2018, playing the whole 90 minutes in a goalless draw against Uzbekistan.

Michel Melki was called up for the 2019 AFC Asian Cup, alongside his brother Alexander, one month later. On 17 January 2019, he scored the equaliser in an eventual 4–1 win against North Korea in the final group stage game, and was nominated Man of the Match for his performance.

In December 2023, Michel Melki was initially included in the Lebanese squad for the 2023 AFC Asian Cup. However, he withdrew injured in January 2024 before the competition and was replaced by Khalil Khamis.

== Style of play ==
A versatile defensive-minded player, Michel Melki can mainly be deployed as either a centre-back or a defensive midfielder. His main characteristics are his physicality and his ball-winning capabilities. While at AIK, Michel Melki was also used as an attacking midfielder.

== Career statistics ==
=== Club ===
As of match played 24 July 2026

Appearances and goals by club, season and competition
Club	Season	League			National cup (Note: Includes Svenska Cupen, Turkish Cup, Norwegian Football Cup, Lebanese FA Cup)		League cup (Note: Includes Lebanese Federation Cup)		Continental		Other		Total	
Club	Season	Division	Apps	Goals	Apps	Goals	Apps	Goals	Apps	Goals	Apps	Goals	Apps	Goals
Syrianska	2013	Allsvenskan	3	0	3	1	—		—		—		6	1
Syrianska	2014	Superettan	5	0	—		—		—		—		5	0
Syrianska	2015	Superettan	2	0	4	0	—		—		—		6	0
Syrianska	2016	Superettan	11	1	—		—		—		—		11	1
Syrianska	Total		21	1	7	1	0	0	0	0	0	0	28	2
Eskişehirspor	2016–17	TFF First League	3	0	1	0	—		—		—		4	0
Eskişehirspor	2017–18	TFF First League	7	1	1	0	—		—		—		8	1
Eskişehirspor	Total		10	1	2	0	0	0	0	0	0	0	12	1
AFC Eskilstuna	2018	Superettan	21	0	7	2	—		—		2 (Note: Appearances in Superettan promotion play-offs)	0	30	2
AFC Eskilstuna	2019	Allsvenskan	8	0	—		—		—		—		8	0
AFC Eskilstuna	Total		29	0	7	2	0	0	0	0	2	0	38	2
AIK	2019	Allsvenskan	8	0	3	0	—		0	0	—		11	0
AIK	2020	Allsvenskan	8	0	2	0	—		—		—		10	0
AIK	2021	Allsvenskan	0	0	—		—		—		—		0	0
AIK	Total		16	0	5	0	0	0	0	0	0	0	21	0
Sarpsborg 08 (loan)	2021	Eliteserien	1	0	—		—		—		—		1	0
AFC Eskilstuna (loan)	2021	Superettan	13	1	1	0	—		—		—		14	1
AFC Eskilstuna (loan)	2022	Superettan	10	1	0	0	—		—		—		10	1
AFC Eskilstuna (loan)	Total		23	2	1	0	0	0	0	0	0	0	24	2
AFC Eskilstuna	2022	Superettan	13	0	0	0	—		—		—		13	0
Ahed	2022–23	Lebanese Premier League	7	0	3	1	—		—		—		10	1
Ahed	2023–24	Lebanese Premier League	21	1	1	0	3	0	9 (Note: Appearances in AFC Cup)	0	1 (Note: Appearance in Lebanese Super Cup)	0	35	1
Ahed	Total		28	1	4	1	3	0	9	0	1	0	45	2
Safa	2024–25	Lebanese Premier League	25	5	—		—		—		—		25	5
Nejmeh	2025–26	Lebanese Premier League	9	2	0	0	—		—		2 (Note: Appearances in National Solidarity Tournament)	0	11	2
Career total			175	12	26	4	3	0	9	0	5	0	218	16

=== International ===
As of match played 6 June 2024

Appearances and goals by national team and year
National team	Year	Apps	Goals
Lebanon	2018	2	0
Lebanon	2019	9	1
Lebanon	2020	0	0
Lebanon	2021	13	0
Lebanon	2022	3	0
Lebanon	2023	5	0
Lebanon	2024	1	0
Total		33	1

Scores and results list Lebanon's goal tally first, score column indicates score after each Michel Melki goal.

List of international goals scored by Felix Michel Melki
No.	Date	Venue	Opponent	Score	Result	Competition	Ref.
1	17 January 2019	Sharjah Stadium, Sharjah, United Arab Emirates	North Korea	1–1	4–1	2019 AFC Asian Cup	

== Honours ==
AFC Eskilstuna

- Svenska Cupen runner-up: 2018–19

Ahed

- Lebanese Premier League: 2022–23
- Lebanese Federation Cup: 2023
- Lebanese FA Cup runner-up: 2022–23, 2023–24
- Lebanese Super Cup runner-up: 2023
- AFC Cup runner-up: 2023–24

Nejmeh

- Lebanese FA Cup: 2025–26

== See also ==
- List of Lebanon international footballers born outside Lebanon
- List of association football families
