= Hasan Srour =

Lebanese footballer (born 2001)

- Srour with Lebanon in 2024

Personal information
- Full name: Hasan Bassem Srour
- Date of birth: 18 December 2001 (age 24)
- Place of birth: Haret Hreik, Lebanon
- Height: 1.76 m (5 ft 9 in)
- Position: Midfielder

Team information
- Current team: Jwaya
- Number: 8

Youth career
- Ahed

Senior career*
Years	Team	Apps	(Gls)
2020–2024	Ahed	70	(4)
2024–2025	Al-Zawraa	4	(0)
2025	Al-Hudood	15	(1)
2025–	Jwaya	20	(0)

International career^{‡}
2019	Lebanon U19	3	(0)
2021–2022	Lebanon U23	9	(0)
2022–	Lebanon	23	(0)
- * Club domestic league appearances and goals as of 09:41, 3 August 2026 (UTC) ‡ National team caps and goals as of 1 October 2026

Hasan Bassem Srour (Arabic: حسن باسم سرور; born 18 December 2001) is a Lebanese footballer who plays as a midfielder for Lebanese Premier League club Jwaya and the Lebanon national team.

== Club career ==
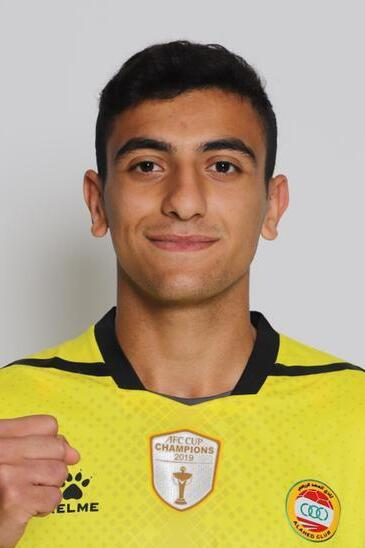
Srour with Ahed in 2021

Coming through the youth system, Srour began his senior career at Ahed in the Lebanese Premier League. He scored his first goal on 12 December 2020, helping his side beat Safa 2–1 in the league.

Srour moved to Iraqi side Al-Zawraa ahead of the 2024–25 Iraq Stars League season on a one-season contract. In January 2025, he joined fellow Iraq Stars League club Al-Hudood.

On 14 July 2025, Srour joined newly promoted club Jwaya.

== International career ==
Srour represented the Lebanon national under-19 team at the 2020 AFC U-19 Championship qualification, playing three games in 2019. He also played for the under-23 team in the 2020 AFC U-19 Championship qualification in 2019, and the 2021 and 2022 WAFF U-23 Championship tournaments.

On 30 December 2022, Srour made his international senior debut in a 1–0 friendly defeat to the United Arab Emirates. In December 2023, Srour was included in the Lebanese squad for the 2023 AFC Asian Cup.

== Style of play ==
Srour was noted as a promising player in his youth by local media.

== Career statistics ==
=== International ===
As of match played 1 October 2026

Appearances and goals by national team and year
National team	Year	Apps	Goals
Lebanon	2022	1	0
Lebanon	2023	8	0
Lebanon	2024	11	0
Lebanon	2025	1	0
Lebanon	2026	2	0
Total		23	0

== Honours ==
Ahed

- Lebanese Premier League: 2021–22, 2022–23
- Lebanese Federation Cup: 2023
- Lebanese Elite Cup: 2022
- Lebanese FA Cup runner-up: 2023–24
- Lebanese Super Cup runner-up: 2023
- AFC Cup runner-up: 2023–24
