= 2024 Lebanese Super Cup =

23rd edition of the Lebanese Super Cup

Nejmeh	Ansar
3	1
- Date: 14 September 2024
- Venue: Tripoli Municipal Stadium, Tripoli
- Referee: Hussein Abo Yehia

The 2024 Lebanese Super Cup was the 23rd Lebanese Super Cup, an annual association football match contested by the winners of the previous season's Lebanese Premier League and Lebanese FA Cup competitions.

It was played at the Tripoli Municipal Stadium on 14 September 2024, and featured the 2023–24 Lebanese Premier League champions Nejmeh and the 2023–24 Lebanese FA Cup winners Ansar. Nejmeh defended their title be defeating Ansar 3–1, winning their eighth Lebanese Super Cup title.

== Match ==
=== Summary ===
Nejmeh took the lead in the 9th minute through Collins Opare after an early spell of attacking pressure. The team doubled its advantage in the 26th minute when Rabih Ataya scored to extend the lead. Ansar reduced the deficit in the 36th minute via Ali Tneich, bringing the score to 2–1 and briefly re-establishing competitive balance. However, Nejmeh restored its two-goal advantage shortly before half-time, with Collins scoring again in first-half stoppage time (45+7) to complete his brace and make it 3–1.

No further goals were scored in the second half. Ansar applied offensive pressure early after the interval, including a disallowed goal, while Nejmeh maintained defensive organisation and managed the remainder of the match without significant threat. The scoreline remained unchanged until the final whistle.

=== Details ===
14 September 2024
16:30 UTC+3

Nejmeh	3–1	Ansar
Opare 9', 45'; Ataya 26'	Report	Tneich

Tripoli Municipal Stadium, Tripoli
Referee: Hussein Abo Yehia

Nejmeh	Ansar

GK	21	(Lebanon) Mohamad Bechara
DF	16	(Lebanon) Mohamad Safwan	(yellow card) 48'
DF	18	(Lebanon) Kassem El Zein (c)
DF	19	(Ghana) Darko Nyanteh
DF	77	(Lebanon) Said Awada
MF	6	(Lebanon) Hussein Monzer		(substituted off) 65'
MF	8	(Lebanon) Bilal Al Sabbagh		(substituted off) 70'
MF	15	(Ghana) Baba Musah	(yellow card) 42'
MF	20	(Lebanon) Hassan Kourani	(yellow card) 85'	(substituted off) 90+10'
MF	37	(Ghana) Collins Opare	(yellow card) 90+8'
FW	30	(Lebanon) Rabih Ataya		(substituted off) 90+10'
Substitutes:
GK	1	(Lebanon) Ali Sabeh
DF	2	(Lebanon) Ali Alrida Ismail
DF	13	(Lebanon) Abdallah Moughrabi		(substituted on) 70'
DF	24	(Lebanon) Maher Sabra
MF	10	(Lebanon) Mahdi Zein		(substituted on) 65'
MF	23	(Lebanon) Hassan Sherkawi
FW	7	(Lebanon) Mohamad Omar Sadek
FW	9	(Lebanon) Fadel Antar		(substituted on) 90+10'
FW	11	(Lebanon) Mohammad Markabawi		(substituted on) 90+10'
Manager:
(Serbia) Dragan Jovanović

GK	91	(Lebanon) Nazih Assaad
DF	5	(Lebanon) Nassar Nassar (c)		(substituted off) 84'
DF	6	(Lebanon) Maxime Aoun
DF	35	(Tunisia) Rafik Mednini
MF	7	(Palestine) Mohamad Hebous		(substituted off) 67'
MF	8	(Lebanon) Ali Tneich	(yellow card) 90+5'
MF	12	(Lebanon) Ahmad Kheir El Dine		(substituted off) 46'
MF	31	(Algeria) Hicham Khalf Allah		(substituted off) 84'
FW	9	(Senegal) Elhadji Malick Tall
FW	10	(Lebanon) Hassan Maatouk		(substituted off) 67'
FW	24	(Lebanon) Hassan Kaafarani	(yellow card) 80'
Substitutes:
GK	1	(Lebanon) Hadi Kanj
DF	2	(Lebanon) Mohamad El Dor
DF	3	(Lebanon) Mohamad Al Mahdi Al Moussawi
DF	16	(Lebanon) Abbas Ballout
MF	4	(Lebanon) Nader Matar		(substituted on) 46'
MF	11	(Lebanon) Youssef Al Haj		(substituted on) 67'
MF	17	(Palestine) Hamza Hussein		(substituted on) 67'
FW	22	(Lebanon) Mohammad Al Massri		(substituted on) 84'
FW	30	(Lebanon) Mohammad El Saleh		(substituted on) 84'
Manager:
(Lebanon) Youssef Al Jawhari

Match rules

- 90 minutes
- Penalty shoot-out if scores level
- Nine named substitutes, of which five may be used

== See also ==
- 2024–25 Lebanese Premier League
