= Hasan Farhat =

Lebanese footballer (born 2004)

Personal information
- Full name: Hasan Nadim Farhat
- Date of birth: 21 September 2004 (age 22)
- Place of birth: Ghobeiry, Lebanon
- Height: 1.82 m (6 ft 0 in)
- Position: Centre-back

Team information
- Current team: Jwaya
- Number: 30

Youth career
- –2024: Ahed

Senior career*
Years	Team	Apps	(Gls)
2021–2025	Ahed	44	(2)
2025–	Jwaya	13	(1)

International career^{‡}
2023–2026	Lebanon U23	7	(2)
2025–	Lebanon	5	(0)
- * Club domestic league appearances and goals as of 09:31, 3 August 2026 (UTC) ‡ National team caps and goals as of 17 November 2026

Hasan Nadim Farhat (Arabic: حسن نديم فرحات; born 21 September 2004) is a Lebanese footballer who plays as a centre-back for Lebanese Premier League club Jwaya and the Lebanon national team.

== Club career ==
Coming through the youth system at Ahed, Farhat established himself as a starter during the 2024–25 Lebanese Premier League. In January 2025, he was among the young players highlighted for their performances in Ahed's 2–1 victory over Nejmeh. On 25 December, he scored his first goal of the 2025–26 season in a 4–1 victory over Bourj.

On 30 December 2025, Farhat transferred to Jwaya for the second half of the 2025–26 season.

== International career ==
Farhat played for the Lebanon national under-23 team at the 2023 Arab Games and the 2025 WAFF U-23 Championship. He took part in the 2026 AFC U-23 Asian Cup qualification, scoring two headers against Thailand and contributing to the team's first-ever qualification for the final tournament. He was called up for the final tournament, held in Saudi Arabia in January 2026.

Farhat was first called up to the Lebanon national team ahead of a friendly match against Oman on 28 May 2025, and made his debut as a second-half substitute.

== Career statistics ==
=== Club ===
As of match played 1 August 2026

Appearances and goals by club, season and competition
Club	Season	League			Lebanon Cup		League cup (Note: Includes Lebanese Elite Cup, Lebanese Federation Cup)		Continental		Other		Total	
Club	Season	Division	Apps	Goals	Apps	Goals	Apps	Goals	Apps	Goals	Apps	Goals	Apps	Goals
Ahed	2020–21	Lebanese Premier League	1	0	—		—		—		—		1	0
Ahed	2021–22	Lebanese Premier League	1	0	—		—		—		—		1	0
Ahed	2022–23	Lebanese Premier League	2	0	0	0	—		—		—		2	0
Ahed	2023–24	Lebanese Premier League	6	0	3	0	0	0	0 (Note: Appearances in AFC Cup)	0	0 (Note: Appearance in Lebanese Super Cup)	0	9	0
Ahed	2024–25	Lebanese Premier League	24	1	—		—		—		—		24	1
Ahed	2025–26	Lebanese Premier League	10	1	0	0	—		—		—		10	1
Ahed	Total		44	2	3	0	0	0	0	0	0	0	47	2
Jwaya	2025–26	Lebanese Premier League	13	1	1	0	—		—		2 (Note: Appearances in National Solidarity Tournament)	0	16	1
Career total			57	3	4	0	0	0	0	0	2	0	63	3

=== International ===
As of match played 17 November 2026

Appearances and goals by national team and year
National team	Year	Apps	Goals
Lebanon	2025	2	0
Lebanon	2026	3	0
Total		5	0

== Honours ==
Ahed

- Lebanese Premier League: 2021–22, 2022–23
- Lebanese FA Cup runner-up: 2023–24
