= Said Awada =

Lebanese footballer (born 1992)

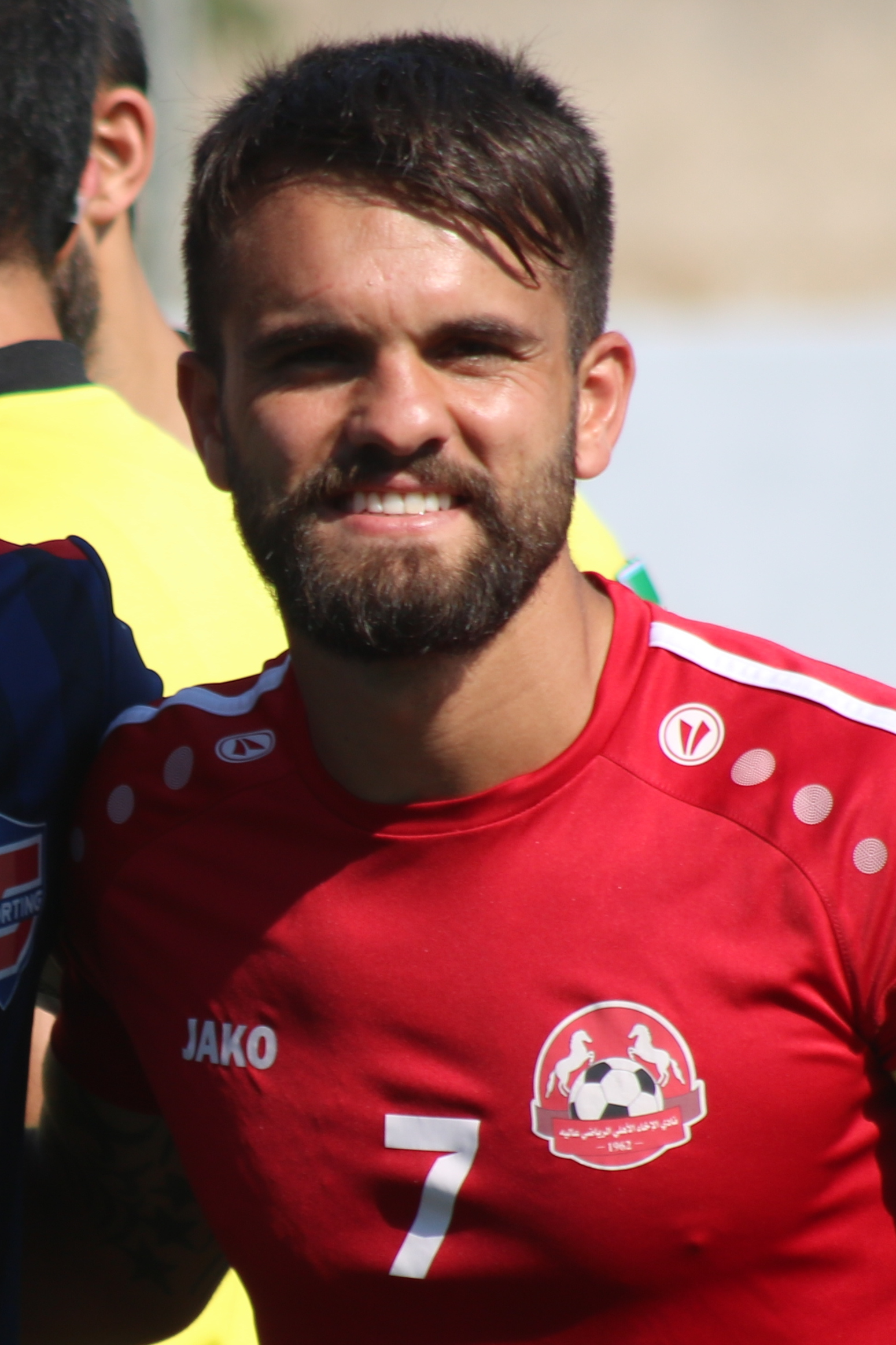
- Awada with Akhaa Ahli Aley in 2021

Personal information
- Full name: Said Abdul Hassan Awada
- Date of birth: 7 November 1992 (age 34)
- Place of birth: Jwaya, Lebanon
- Position: Full-back

Team information
- Current team: Jwaya
- Number: 7

Senior career*
Years	Team	Apps	(Gls)
2012–2014	Tadamon Sour	25	(5)
2014–2022	Akhaa Ahli Aley	107+	(11+)
2022–2025	Nejmeh	34	(2)
2025–	Jwaya	24	(1)

International career^{‡}
2022–2023	Lebanon	2	(0)
- * Club domestic league appearances and goals as of 13 September 2026 ‡ National team caps and goals as of 31 December 2023

Said Abdul Hassan Awada (Arabic: سعيد عبد الحسن عواضة; born 7 November 1992) is a Lebanese footballer who plays as a full-back for Lebanese Premier League club Jwaya.

== Club career ==
Starting his career with Tadamon Sour, Awada helped them win the 2013 Lebanese Challenge Cup.

He joined Akhaa Ahli Aley in 2014; in 2018–19, he helped them to a fourth-place finish in the Lebanese Premier League and a semi-final in the Lebanese FA Cup, both club records for Akhaa. In November 2018, following an injury that kept him on the sidelines for eight months, Awada returned to training with Akhaa. Awada was eventually made club captain.

In April 2022, Awada signed for Nejmeh on a three-year contract, ahead of the 2022–23 season. On 30 June 2024, he assisted a decisive goal to Kassem El Zein in the 95th minute in the last game of the 2023–24 Lebanese Premier League against Ansar, helping Nejmeh to win the league for the first time in 10 years.

== International career ==
Awada made his debut for the Lebanon national team on 30 December 2022, in a 1–0 friendly defeat to the United Arab Emirates.

== Career statistics ==
=== International ===
As of match played 12 October 2023

Appearances and goals by national team and year
National team	Year	Apps	Goals
Lebanon	2022	1	0
Lebanon	2023	1	0
Total		2	0

== Honours ==
Tadamon Sour

- Lebanese Challenge Cup: 2013

Nejmeh

- Lebanese Premier League: 2023–24
- Lebanese FA Cup: 2022–23
- Lebanese Super Cup: 2023, 2024
