= Adnan Melhem =

Lebanese footballer (born 1989)

- Melhem in 2019

Personal information
- Full name: Adnan Ghaleb Melhem
- Date of birth: 29 April 1989 (age 37)
- Place of birth: Machghara, Lebanon
- Height: 1.76 m (5 ft 9 in)
- Position: Striker

Team information
- Current team: Ittihad Haret Naameh
- Number: 19

Senior career*
Years	Team	Apps	(Gls)
2011–2012	Ahed	10	(1)
2012–2018	Racing Beirut	93	(33)
2014–2015	→ Naft Maysan (loan)		(1)
2018–2019	Salam Zgharta	14	(3)
2019–2020	Tadamon Sour	3	(1)
2020–2021	Shabab Bourj	16	(10)
2021–2023	Tadamon Sour	20	(6)
2023–2024	Sagesse	14	(1)
2024–2025	Jwaya	16	(3)
2025–2026	Ahly Nabatieh	10	(1)
2026–	Ittihad Haret Naameh	10	(5)

International career
2013	Lebanon	2	(0)
- * Club domestic league appearances and goals as of 27 June 2026

Adnan Ghaleb Melhem (Arabic: عدنان غالب ملحم; born 29 April 1989) is a Lebanese footballer who plays as a striker for Lebanese Second Division club Ittihad Haret Naameh.

== Club career ==
Melhem began playing football in Meidoun, Beqaa Governorate, Lebanon, playing for local teams before signing for Ahed. In 2012, he signed for Racing Beirut. Melhem finished top scorer in the 2013–14 Lebanese Premier League with 13 goals. He signed for Iraqi club Naft Maysan in summer 2014 for one season. During the 2014–15 season, Melhem returned from Naft Maysan to Racing Beirut, but the club was unable to register him because his international transfer certificate did not arrive within the required period.

In July 2018, Melhem signed for Salam Zgharta on a three-year deal. In June 2019, he joined Tadamon Sour on a one-year contract. In July 2020, Shabab Bourj announced the signing of Melhem on a free transfer, on a one-year contract. He scored 10 goals in the 2020–21 season, finishing as the second-top goalscorer, behind Hassan Maatouk with 14 goals, and helping his side avoid relegation.

In May 2021, Melhem returned to Tadamon Sour on a two-year deal. In April 2023, Melhem joined Sagesse from Tadamon Sour, and was included in the club's squad for the 2023–24 season. After helping Jwaya win the 2024–25 Lebanese Second Division title, the club parted ways with the player in August 2025 on mutual terms.

In August 2025, Melhem joined Second Division side Ahly Nabatieh. Melhem signed for Second Division side Ittihad Haret Naameh in January 2026.

== International career ==
After leading the goalscoring chart mid-2013–14 Lebanese Premier League season, with eight goals in the first 10 matchdays, Melhem was called up to the Lebanon national team by head coach Giuseppe Giannini ahead of the 2013 WAFF Championship in Qatar. He played both group-stage games, against Jordan and Kuwait.

== Honours ==
Ahed

- Lebanese Elite Cup: 2011
- Lebanese Super Cup: 2011

Jwaya

- Lebanese Second Division: 2024–25

Individual

- Lebanese Premier League Team of the Season: 2013–14
- Lebanese Premier League top scorer: 2013–14
