= Mohamad Safwan =

Lebanese footballer (born 2003)

- Safwan with Lebanon in 2024

Personal information
- Full name: Mohamad Hussein Safwan
- Date of birth: 10 March 2003 (age 23)
- Place of birth: El Ain, Lebanon
- Height: 1.80 m (5 ft 11 in)
- Position: Left-back

Team information
- Current team: Jwaya

Youth career
- –2019: Hoops
- 2019–2022: Bourj

Senior career*
Years	Team	Apps	(Gls)
2021–2023	Bourj	1	(0)
2022	→ Akhaa Ahli Aley (loan)	10	(0)
2023–2026	Nejmeh	58	(5)
2026–	Jwaya	0	(0)

International career^{‡}
2021	Lebanon U18		
2022	Lebanon U20	3	(2)
2023–2026	Lebanon U23	7	(0)
2024–	Lebanon	12	(1)
Medal record
Men's football
Representing Lebanon
WAFF U-18 Championship
Silver medal – second place	2021	U-18 Team
- * Club domestic league appearances and goals as of 10:14, 3 August 2026 (UTC) ‡ National team caps and goals as of 13 January 2026

Mohamad Hussein Safwan (Arabic: محمد حسين صفوان; born 10 March 2003) is a Lebanese footballer who plays as a left-back for Lebanese Premier League club Jwaya and the Lebanon national team.

== Club career ==
Having played for Hoops's youth team, Safwan moved Bourj in August 2019, initially joining their youth team. In March 2022, he was loaned to Akhaa Ahli Aley for the rest of the 2021–22 season. Safwan helped Bourj lift the youth league title in 2021–22, and played a few games with the senior team in the 2022–23 season.

After having been released by Bourj in the summer of 2023, Safwan joined Nejmeh as a free agent in June. He helped Nejmeh lift the 2023–24 Lebanese Premier League title and the 2023 Lebanese Super Cup in his first season. In April 2026, Safwan suffered a foot fracture during a friendly match.

Following five months of contract negotiations with Nejmeh, Safwan decided to depart from the club and joined Jwaya in August 2026.

== International career ==
Safwan represented Lebanon at various youth levels. In 2021, he was part of Lebanon's squad for the WAFF U-18 Championship, where the team reached the final before finishing as runners-up to Iraq. Safwan was called up to the Lebanon national under-23 team for the 2026 AFC U-23 Asian Cup, held in Saudi Arabia in January 2026.

Safwan received his first call-up to the Lebanon national team in August 2024 for the Merdeka Tournament. He made his international debut on 19 November 2024, in a 3–2 friendly victory over Myanmar, being substituted at halftime. By 25 March 2025, he had recorded four assists in his first five international appearances, including two during Lebanon's 2027 Asian Cup qualification match against Brunei. On 14 October 2025, he scored his first international goal in a 4–0 win against Bhutan in the 2027 Asian Cup qualifiers.

== Style of play ==
Safwan is a modern left-back known for his technical ability, attacking-mindedness and pace, often overlapping with attackers. His versatility allows him to adapt to roles in central midfield or on the wing.

== Career statistics ==
=== Club ===
As of match played 9 March 2025

Appearances and goals by club, season and competition
Club	Season	League			Lebanon Cup		League cup (Note: Includes Lebanese Elite Cup, Lebanese Federation Cup)		Continental		Other		Total	
Club	Season	Division	Apps	Goals	Apps	Goals	Apps	Goals	Apps	Goals	Apps	Goals	Apps	Goals
Bourj	2020–21	Lebanese Premier League	0	0	2	0	—		—		—		2	0
Bourj	2021–22	Lebanese Premier League	—		—		—		—		—		0	0
Bourj	2022–23	Lebanese Premier League	1	0	2	0	0	0	—		—		3	0
Bourj	Total		1	0	4	0	0	0	0	0	0	0	5	0
Akhaa Ahli Aley (loan)	2021–22	Lebanese Premier League	10	0	—		—		—		—		10	0
Nejmeh	2023–24	Lebanese Premier League	22	0	1	0	0	0	4 (Note: Appearances in AFC Cup)	0	1 (Note: Appearance in Lebanese Super Cup)	0	28	0
Nejmeh	2024–25	Lebanese Premier League	5	0	0	0	—		3 (Note: Appearances in AFC Challenge League)	0	1	0	9	0
Nejmeh	Total		27	0	1	0	0	0	7	0	2	0	37	0
Career total			38	0	5	0	0	0	7	0	2	0	52	0

=== International ===
As of match played 26 November 2025

Appearances and goals by national team and year
National team	Year	Apps	Goals
Lebanon	2024	3	0
Lebanon	2025	9	1
Total		12	1

Scores and results list Lebanon's goal tally first, score column indicates score after each Safwan goal.

List of international goals scored by Mohamad Safwan
No.	Date	Venue	Opponent	Score	Result	Competition
1	14 October 2025	Saoud bin Abdulrahman Stadium, Al Wakrah, Qatar	Bhutan	3–0	4–0	2027 Asian Cup qualification

== Honours ==
Nejmeh

- Lebanese Premier League: 2023–24
- Lebanese FA Cup: 2025–26
- Lebanese Super Cup: 2023, 2024

Lebanon U18

- WAFF U-18 Championship runner-up: 2021
