= 2023 Lebanese Super Cup =

22nd edition of the Lebanese Super Cup

Nejmeh	Ahed
0	0
- Nejmeh won 4–1 on penalties
- Date: 30 July 2023
- Venue: Fouad Chehab Stadium, Jounieh
- Referee: Ahmad Alaeddin

The 2023 Lebanese Super Cup was the 22nd Lebanese Super Cup, an annual football match played between the winners of the previous season's Lebanese Premier League and the winners of the previous season's Lebanese FA Cup.

The match was played at the Fouad Chehab Stadium on 30 July 2023. Nejmeh won their seventh title, defeating Ahed on penalties, following a 0–0 draw after regular time.

== Match ==
=== Summary ===
Ahed began the match on the offensive, with Nejmeh's goalkeeper Ali Sabeh saving several efforts, most notably a shot by Lee Erwin in the 15th minute. Three minutes later, successive shots by Mohammad Abu Hasheesh and Erwin were dealt with by Sabeh and defender Kassem El Zein, respectively. In the second half, Nejmeh took control of the game, with Hassan Kourani's free kick effort finishing just above the goal. Ahed's most dangerous chance came in the 72nd minute: Karim Darwich crossed to Erwin, who headed the ball just wide. Nejmeh's Khalil Bader also tried to score after dribbling past several players in the 88nd minute, but his shot was too weak. After a goalless draw in regular time, the match directly progressed into a penalty shoot-out. Nejmeh scored four penalties to Ahed's one, and won their seventh Super Cup title.

=== Details ===
30 July 2023
17:00 UTC+3

Ahed	0–0	Nejmeh
	Report
Penalties
Haidar (penalty missed); Melki (penalty scored); Mansour (penalty missed)	1–4	(penalty scored) Kourani; (penalty scored) El Zein; (penalty scored) Embaló; (penalty scored) Ismail

Fouad Chehab Stadium, Jounieh
Referee: Ahmad Alaeddin

Ahed	Nejmeh

GK	95	(Lebanon) Mostafa Matar
DF	4	(Lebanon) Nour Mansour
DF	19	(Syria) Mohammad Abu Hasheesh		(substituted off) 80'
DF	23	(Lebanon) Ali Hadid
MF	6	(Syria) Mohammad Al Marmour		(substituted off) 90'
MF	7	(Lebanon) Ali Al Haj
MF	10	(Lebanon) Mohamad Haidar
MF	18	(Lebanon) George Felix Melki
MF	22	(Lebanon) Walid Shour	(yellow card) 12'	(substituted off) 46'
FW	9	(Scotland) Lee Erwin		(substituted off) 80'
FW	17	(Lebanon) Zein Farran		(substituted off) 70'
Substitutes:
GK	13	(Lebanon) Shaker Wehbe
GK	21	(Lebanon) Shareef Azaki
DF	8	(Lebanon) Hussein Dakik		(substituted in) 80'
DF	70	(Lebanon) Hassan Farhat
MF	12	(Lebanon) Hasan Srour		(substituted in) 46'
MF	30	(Lebanon) Mahmoud Zbib		(substituted in) 80'
FW	11	(Lebanon) Karim Darwich		(substituted in) 70'
FW	15	(Syria) Mohammad Al Hallak		(substituted in) 90'
FW	20	(Lebanon) Karim Fadel
Manager:
(Syria) Raafat Mohammad

GK	1	(Lebanon) Ali Sabeh
DF	13	(Lebanon) Abdallah Moughrabi		(substituted off) 84'
DF	18	(Lebanon) Kassem El Zein
DF	24	(Lebanon) Maher Sabra
DF	77	(Lebanon) Said Awada
MF	6	(Lebanon) Bilal Najdi	(yellow card) 31'	(substituted off) 84'
MF	20	(Lebanon) Hassan Kourani
MF	21	(Portugal) Gilson da Costa		(substituted off) 38'
MF	26	(Ukraine) Dmytro Bilonoh		(substituted off) 63'
FW	7	(Lebanon) Khalil Bader
FW	70	(Lebanon) Mohamad Omar Sadek		(substituted off) 84'
Substitutes:
GK	25	(Lebanon) Mohammad Zahr
DF	2	(Lebanon) Ali Alrida Ismail		(substituted in) 84'
DF	3	(Lebanon) Houssein Mortada
MF	10	(Lebanon) Mahdi Zein
MF	12	(Lebanon) Mohamad Saad
MF	16	(Lebanon) Mohamad Safwan		(substituted in) 84'
FW	8	(Australia) Louis Khoury		(substituted in) 38'
FW	9	(Lebanon) Hassan Mehanna		(substituted in) 63'
FW	88	(Guinea-Bissau) José Embaló		(substituted in) 84'
Manager:
(Portugal) Paulo Menezes

Match rules

- 90 minutes
- Penalty shoot-out if scores level
- Nine named substitutes, of which five may be used

== See also ==
- 2023–24 Lebanese Premier League
- 2023–24 Lebanese FA Cup
- 2023 Lebanese Federation Cup
