= Hussein Monzer =

Lebanese footballer (born 1997)

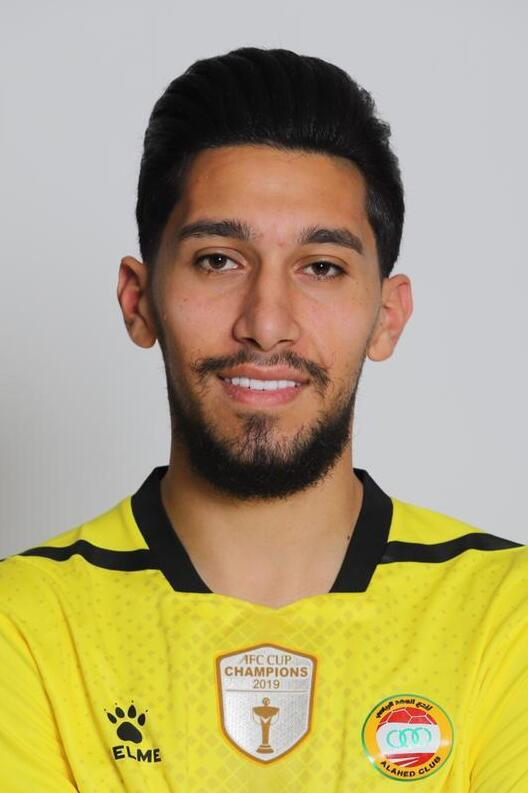
- Monzer with Ahed in 2021

Personal information
- Full name: Hussein Ali Monzer
- Date of birth: 20 March 1997 (age 29)
- Place of birth: Odaisseh, Lebanon
- Height: 1.72 m (5 ft 8 in)
- Position: Midfielder

Team information
- Current team: Jwaya
- Number: 6

Senior career*
Years	Team	Apps	(Gls)
2016–2023	Ahed	82	(8)
2023–2024	Shabab Sahel	17	(0)
2024–2025	Nejmeh	17	(0)
2025–	Jwaya	13	(0)

International career^{‡}
2015	Lebanon U19	3	(1)
2017–2019	Lebanon U23	5	(1)
2019–	Lebanon	14	(0)
- * Club domestic league appearances and goals as of 13 September 2026 ‡ National team caps and goals as of 17 November 2026

Hussein Ali Monzer (Arabic: حسين علي منذر, Lebanese Arabic pronunciation: [ħ(u)seːn ˈmonzir]; born 20 March 1997) is a Lebanese footballer who plays as a midfielder for Lebanese Premier League club Jwaya and the Lebanon national team..

== Club career ==
On 24 May 2023, Monzer joined Shabab Sahel on a five-year contract. One year later, Monzer moved to Nejmeh ahead of the 2024–25 season. He joined newly promoted club Jwaya on 1 August 2025, on a two-year contract.

== International career ==
Monzer played for the Lebanon national under-19 team during the 2016 AFC U-19 Championship qualification, playing three times and scoring once. He also played for the U23 team during the 2018 AFC U-23 Championship qualification, playing in all three games, as well as in two 2020 qualifications games, scoring against the Maldives in a 6–0 victory.

He made his debut for the senior team on 30 July 2019, in a 1–0 defeat against Iraq at the 2019 WAFF Championship.

== Career statistics ==
=== International ===
As of match played 17 November 2026

Appearances and goals by national team and year
National team	Year	Apps	Goals
Lebanon	2019	7	0
Lebanon	2020	1	0
Lebanon	2021	4	0
Lebanon	2022	0	0
Lebanon	2023	0	0
Lebanon	2024	0	0
Lebanon	2025	0	0
Lebanon	2026	2	0
Total		14	0

== Honours ==
Ahed

- AFC Cup: 2019
- Lebanese Premier League: 2016–17, 2017–18, 2018–19, 2021–22, 2022–23
- Lebanese FA Cup: 2017–18, 2018–19; runner-up: 2022–23
- Lebanese Elite Cup: 2022; runner-up: 2021
- Lebanese Super Cup: 2017, 2018, 2019

Nejmeh

- Lebanese Super Cup: 2024

Individual

- Lebanese Premier League Team of the Season: 2016–17, 2018–19
