= 2025–26 Lebanese FA Cup =

Tournament details
- Country: Lebanon
- Dates: 16 November 2025 – 8 July 2026
- Teams: 16

Final positions
- Champions: Nejmeh (9th title)
- Runners-up: Sagesse

Tournament statistics
- Matches played: 15
- Goals scored: 36 (2.4 per match)
- Top goal scorer: Ali El Fadl (3 goals)

The 2025–26 Lebanese FA Cup was the 52nd season of the Lebanese FA Cup, the national domestic cup competition for football in Lebanon.

The competition began on 16 November 2025 with the round of 16. Due to the breakout of the 2026 Lebanon war on 2 March 2026, the Lebanese Football Association (LFA) suspended all football activities on 18 March.

Defending champions Ansar, who beat Ahed in the 2024 final to win their 16th title, were eliminated in the quarter-finals by Nejmeh. Nejmeh won their ninth title, after defeating Sagesse 2–0 in the final on 8 July 2026.

== Teams ==
Round	Dates	Number of fixtures	Clubs remaining	New entries this round	Divisions entering this round
Round of 16	16–22 November 2025	8	16 → 8	16	12 Lebanese Premier League teams 4 Lebanese Second Division teams
Quarter-finals	17–18 January 2026	4	8 → 4	none	none
Semi-finals	11 February 2026	2	4 → 2	none	none
Final	TBD 2026	1	2 → 1	none	none

== Round of 16 ==
The round of 16 saw all 12 teams from the 2025–26 Lebanese Premier League participate, as well as the top four-ranked teams from the 2024–25 Lebanese Second Division.

Number of teams per tier still in competition
Premier League	Second Division	Total
12 / 12	4 / 12	16 / 24

16 November 2025	Nejmeh (1)	3–0 (w/o)	Okhwa Kharayeb (2)	Tyre
14:00 UTC+2		Report		Stadium: Sour Municipal Stadium

21 November 2025	Jwaya (1)	3–0	Chabab Ghazieh (2)	Tyre
--:-- UTC+2	Jawad 26'; Kitwa 33'; Kdouh 80' (pen.)	Report		Stadium: Sour Municipal Stadium; Referee: Zaher Boutary

21 November 2025	Safa (1)	4–1	Shabab Baalbek (2)	Bhamdoun
14:00 UTC+2	Haidar 28'; Camara 54' (pen.), 77'; Mehanna 57'	Report	Younes 75'	Stadium: Amin Abdelnour Stadium; Referee: Kazem El Khansa

21 November 2025	Tadamon Sour (1)	2–1	Shabab Sahel (1)	Ansar
14:00 UTC+2	Bazzi 71' (pen.); El Hourani 83'	Report	Markabawi 45'	Stadium: Imam Mousa Sader Stadium; Referee: Maher Al Ali

22 November 2025	Bourj (1)	0–3	Mabarra (1)	Beirut
14:00 UTC+2		Report	Mrad 35'; Koné 89'; Chmouri 90+6'	Stadium: Safa Stadium; Referee: Hadi Salame

22 November 2025	Ansar (1)	1–0	Ahly Nabatieh (2)	Bhamdoun
14:00 UTC+2	Bou Saleh 23'	Report		Stadium: Amin Abdelnour Stadium; Referee: Mohamad Haddad

22 November 2025	Ahed (1)	1–0	Riyadi Abbasiyah (1)	Ansar
14:00 UTC+2	Ezeddine 61'	Report		Stadium: Imam Moussa Sader Stadium; Referee: Wael Haidar

22 November 2025	Racing Beirut (1)	0–4	Sagesse (1)	Jounieh
14:00 UTC+2		Report	Konaté 21'; Bahlawan 23', 25'; Diop 63'	Stadium: Fouad Chehab Stadium; Referee: Ali Al Ashkar

== Quarter-finals ==
Number of teams per tier still in competition
Premier League	Second Division	Total
8 / 12	0 / 12	8 / 24

17 January 2026	Sagesse (1)	1–1 (5–4 p)	Mabarra (1)	Beirut
13:30 UTC+2	Diop 22' (pen.)	Report	Soumaré 45+3'	Stadium: Safa Stadium; Referee: Hussein Abo Yehia

17 January 2026	Jwaya (1)	1–1 (3–0 p)	Safa (1)	Jounieh
16:00 UTC+2	Ayoub 38'	Report	Haidar 9'	Stadium: Fouad Chehab Stadium; Referee: Maher Al Ali

18 January 2026	Ahed (1)	3–1	Tadamon Sour (1)	Bhamdoun
13:30 UTC+2	Anez 75'; Al Massri 83'; Antar 90+1'	Report	Geraldo 72'	Stadium: Amin Abdelnour Stadium; Referee: Wael Haidar

18 January 2026	Nejmeh (1)	1–0	Ansar (1)	Jounieh
14:45 UTC+2	El Fadl 90+3'	Report		Stadium: Fouad Chehab Stadium; Referee: Mohamad Issa

== Semi-finals ==
Number of teams per tier still in competition
Premier League	Second Division	Total
4 / 12	0 / 12	4 / 24

11 February 2026	Ahed (1)	0–0 (2–4 p)	Sagesse (1)	Beirut
13:30 UTC+2		Report		Stadium: Camille Chamoun Sports City Stadium; Referee: Ali Al Ashkar

11 February 2026	Nejmeh (1)	1–1 (4–3 p)	Jwaya (1)	Jounieh
16:00 UTC+2	El Fadl 10'	Report	Kaafarani 22'	Stadium: Fouad Chehab Stadium; Referee: Wael Haidar

== Final ==
Number of teams per tier still in competition
Premier League	Second Division	Total
2 / 12	0 / 12	2 / 24

8 July 2026
21:30 UTC+3

Sagesse (1)	0–2	Nejmeh (1)
	Report	El Fadl 45+3'; Kassas 90+3'

Fouad Chehab Stadium, Jounieh
Referee: Hussein Abo Yehia

== Bracket ==
The following is the bracket which the Lebanese FA Cup resembled. Numbers in parentheses next to the score represent the results of a penalty shoot-out.

Round of 16; 16–22 November 2025
Ahed	1
Riyadi Abbasiyah	0
Tadamon Sour	2
Shabab Sahel	1
Racing Beirut	0
Sagesse	4
Bourj	0
Mabarra	3
Nejmeh	3 (w/o)
Okhwa Kharayeb	0
Ansar	1
Ahly Nabatieh	0
Jwaya	3
Chabab Ghazieh	0
Safa	4
Shabab Baalbek	0

Quarter-finals; 17–18 January 2026
Ahed	3
Tadamon Sour	1
Sagesse	1 (5)
Mabarra	1 (4)
Nejmeh	1
Ansar	0
Jwaya	1 (3)
Safa	1 (0)

Semi-finals; 11 February 2026
Ahed	0 (2)
Sagesse	0 (4)
Nejmeh	1 (4)
Jwaya	0 (3)

Final; 8 July 2026
Sagesse	0
Nejmeh	2

== Top goalscorers ==
Rank	Player	Club	Goals
1	(Lebanon) Ali El Fadl	Nejmeh	3
2	(Senegal) Tidiane Camara	Safa	2
2	(Lebanon) Omar Bahlawan	Sagesse	2
2	(Senegal) Baffa Diop	Sagesse	2
2	(Lebanon) Hussein Haidar	Safa	2

== See other ==
- 2025–26 Lebanese Premier League
