= Hassan Kaafarani =

Lebanese footballer (born 2001)

Personal information
- Full name: Hassan Ali Kaafarani
- Date of birth: 17 December 2001 (age 24)
- Place of birth: Tyre, Lebanon
- Height: 1.80 m (5 ft 11 in)
- Position: Left-back

Team information
- Current team: Jwaya
- Number: 3

Youth career
- Ansar

Senior career*
Years	Team	Apps	(Gls)
2020–2025	Ansar	32	(1)
2022–2023	→ Tadamon Sour (loan)	16	(2)
2025	Riyadi Abbasiyah	12	(0)
2025–	Jwaya	23	(1)

International career^{‡}
2021–2022	Lebanon U23	4	(0)
2026–	Lebanon	4	(0)
- * Club domestic league appearances and goals as of 13 September 2026 ‡ National team caps and goals as of 17 November 2026

Hassan Ali Kaafarani (Arabic: حسن علي قعفراني; born 17 December 2001) is a Lebanese footballer who plays as a left-back for Lebanese Premier League club Jwaya and the Lebanon national team.

== Early life ==
Kaafarani's family comes from Burj Rahal, Tyre District, Lebanon.

== Club career ==
Coming through the youth system, Kaafarani began his senior career at Ansar. In August 2022, he joined Tadamon Sour on loan from Ansar for the 2022–23 season. In March 2025, he signed for Riyadi Abbasiyah for the rest of the 2024–25 season. In July 2025, Kaafarani transferred to Jwaya.

== International career ==
In October 2020, Kaafarani was called up to a Lebanon national under-22 team training camp. He participated with the under-23 team at the 2021 WAFF U-23 Championship and 2022 WAFF U-23 Championship.

Kaafarani received his first call-up to the senior national team from head coach Madjid Bougherra in September 2026, ahead of friendly matches against the Maldives and Kyrgyzstan in October. He made his debut on 1 October, in a 6–0 win against the Maldives.

== Style of play ==
Kaafarani started his career as a right winger, before Ansar coach Abdul-Wahab Abu Al-Hail moved him to left-back. A defender, Kaafarani primarily plays as a left-back. He can also be deployed as a centre-back or midfielder.

== Career statistics ==
=== Club ===
As of match played 13 September 2026

Appearances and goals by club, season and competition
Club	Season	League			Lebanon Cup		League cup (Note: Includes Lebanese Elite Cup, Lebanese Federation Cup)		Continental		Other		Total	
Club	Season	Division	Apps	Goals	Apps	Goals	Apps	Goals	Apps	Goals	Apps	Goals	Apps	Goals
Ansar	2020–21	Lebanese Premier League	5	0	0	0	—		1 (Note: Appearance in AFC Cup)	0	—		6	0
Ansar	2021–22	Lebanese Premier League	9	0	1	0	3	0	0	0	1 (Note: Appearance in Lebanese Super Cup)	0	14	0
Ansar	2022–23	Lebanese Premier League	—		—		—		—		—		0	0
Ansar	2023–24	Lebanese Premier League	18	1	2	0	2	0	—		—		22	1
Ansar	2024–25	Lebanese Premier League	0	0	—		—		—		1	0	1	0
Ansar	Total		32	1	3	0	5	0	1	0	2	0	43	1
Tadamon Sour (loan)	2022–23	Lebanese Premier League	16	2	1	0	—		—		—		17	2
Riyadi Abbasiyah	2024–25	Lebanese Premier League	12	0	—		—		—		—		12	0
Jwaya	2025–26	Lebanese Premier League	23	1	2	1	—		—		2 (Note: Appearances in National Solidarity Tournament)	0	27	2
Jwaya	2026–27	Lebanese Premier League	0	0	2	2	—		—		—		2	2
Jwaya	Total		23	1	4	3	0	0	0	0	2	0	29	4
Career total			83	4	8	3	5	0	1	0	4	0	101	7

=== International ===
As of match played 17 November 2026

Appearances and goals by national team and year
National team	Year	Apps	Goals
Lebanon	2026	4	0
Total		4	0

== Honours ==
Ansar

- Lebanese Premier League: 2020–21
- Lebanese FA Cup: 2023–24
- Lebanese Super Cup: 2021
