= Zein Farran =

Lebanese footballer (born 1999)

- Farran with Lebanon in 2024

Personal information
- Full name: Zein Al Abdine Ghassan Farran
- Date of birth: 21 July 1999 (age 27)
- Place of birth: Tyre, Lebanon
- Height: 1.76 m (5 ft 9 in)
- Position: Winger

Team information
- Current team: Jwaya
- Number: 71

Senior career*
Years	Team	Apps	(Gls)
2017–2020	Islah Borj Shmali	20	(6)
2020–2021	Bourj	14	(3)
2021–2025	Ahed	51	(13)
2022–2023	→ Shabab Sahel (loan)	18	(7)
2025–	Jwaya	26	(2)

International career^{‡}
2021	Lebanon U23	5	(2)
2022–	Lebanon	12	(1)
- * Club domestic league appearances and goals as of 09:46, 3 August 2026 (UTC) ‡ National team caps and goals as of 14 October 2025

Zein Al Abdine Ghassan Farran (Arabic: زين العابدين غسان فران; born 21 July 1999) is a Lebanese footballer who plays as a winger for Lebanese Premier League club Jwaya and the Lebanon national team.

== Club career ==
Farran began his career at Islah Borj Shmali, signing on 2 August 2017. On 15 August 2020, he joined Lebanese Premier League side Bourj.

Farran moved to Ahed on 7 May 2021 on a free transfer, and was loaned out to Shabab Sahel for one year on 28 June 2022. By November, Farran had scored five goals and assisted four in the 2022–23 Lebanese Premier League. He finished the season with seven goals and five assists, and was noted as one of the best players of the season.

On 18 August 2023, in a league game against Ahly Nabatieh, Farran suffered an ACL injury and was forced to sit out the rest of the 2023–24 season.

On 17 July 2025, Farran joined newly promoted club Jwaya.

== International career ==
Farran represented Lebanon internationally at under-23 level. He made his senior debut for the Lebanon national team on 19 November 2022, as a substitute in a 2–0 friendly defeat to Kuwait in Dubai, United Arab Emirates. On 14 October 2025, he scored his first international goal in a 4–0 win against Bhutan in the 2027 Asian Cup qualifiers.

== Style of play ==
Farran was noted as one of Lebanon's top prospects in his youth.

== Career statistics ==
=== International ===
As of match played 14 October 2025

Appearances and goals by national team and year
National team	Year	Apps	Goals
Lebanon	2022	2	0
Lebanon	2023	8	0
Lebanon	2024	0	0
Lebanon	2025	2	1
Total		12	1

Scores and results list Lebanon's goal tally first, score column indicates score after each Farran goal.

List of international goals scored by Zein Farran
No.	Date	Venue	Opponent	Score	Result	Competition
1	14 October 2025	Saoud bin Abdulrahman Stadium, Al Wakrah, Qatar	Bhutan	4–0	4–0	2027 AFC Asian Cup qualification

== Honours ==
Ahed

- Lebanese Premier League: 2021–22
- Lebanese Federation Cup: 2023
- Lebanese FA Cup runner-up: 2023–24
- Lebanese Elite Cup runner-up: 2021
- Lebanese Super Cup runner-up: 2023
- AFC Cup runner-up: 2023–24
