= Rabih Ataya =

Lebanese footballer (born 1989)

- Ataya with Lebanon in 2024

Personal information
- Full name: Rabih Mohammad Ataya
- Date of birth: 16 July 1989 (age 37)
- Place of birth: Tyre, Lebanon
- Height: 1.80 m (5 ft 11 in)
- Position: Right winger

Team information
- Current team: Sagesse
- Number: 30

Senior career*
Years	Team	Apps	(Gls)
2006–2008	Tadamon Sour		
2008–2017	Ansar		(20)
2014	→ Masafi Al-Wasat (loan)		
2017–2018	Zob Ahan	29	(1)
2018–2023	Ahed	28	(2)
2020	→ UiTM (loan)	9	(2)
2021	→ Kedah Darul Aman (loan)	18	(2)
2022	→ Ajman (loan)	1	(0)
2023–2025	Nejmeh	34	(7)
2023–2024	→ TP Mazembe (loan)	3	(1)
2025–	Sagesse	10	(3)

International career^{‡}
2008–2009	Lebanon U19	3	(1)
2011	Lebanon U23	2	(0)
2012–2024	Lebanon	56	(5)
- * Club domestic league appearances and goals as of 13:50, 22 December 2025 (UTC) ‡ National team caps and goals as of 15 December 2024

Rabih Mohammad Ataya (Arabic: ربیع محمد عطایا, Lebanese Arabic pronunciation: [raˈbiːʕ mˈħammad ʕɑˈtˤɑːja]; born 16 July 1989) is a Lebanese professional footballer who plays as a right winger for Lebanese Premier League club Sagesse.

Starting his career at Tadamon Sour in 2006, Ataya moved to Ansar, where he played for nine seasons. He helped them win a Lebanese FA Cup and a Lebanese Super Cup. In 2016, he moved to Iranian side Zob Ahan; Ataya returned to Lebanon two years later, joining Ahed. He won the 2019 AFC Cup, among other domestic titles. Ataya then moved to Malaysia, on loan to UiTM and Kedah Darul Aman in 2020 and 2021, respectively. He also had a one-match stint at Ajman in the United Arab Emirates. In 2023, Ataya joined Nejmeh who promptly sent him on loan to TP Mazembe in DR Congo. He then moved to Sagesse in 2025.

Having represented Lebanon internationally at youth level, Ataya made his senior debut in 2012. He helped Lebanon qualify for the 2019 AFC Asian Cup, in which he played.

== Club career ==
=== Early career ===
Ataya began his career at hometown club Tadamon Sour in the Lebanese Premier League in 2006. He then moved to Ansar in 2008. On 5 February 2015, Ataya joined Iraqi Premier League club Masafi Al-Wasat for the rest of the season. He remained at Ansar until 2017, scoring 20 league goals, and appearing in the 2013 AFC Cup.

=== Zob Ahan ===
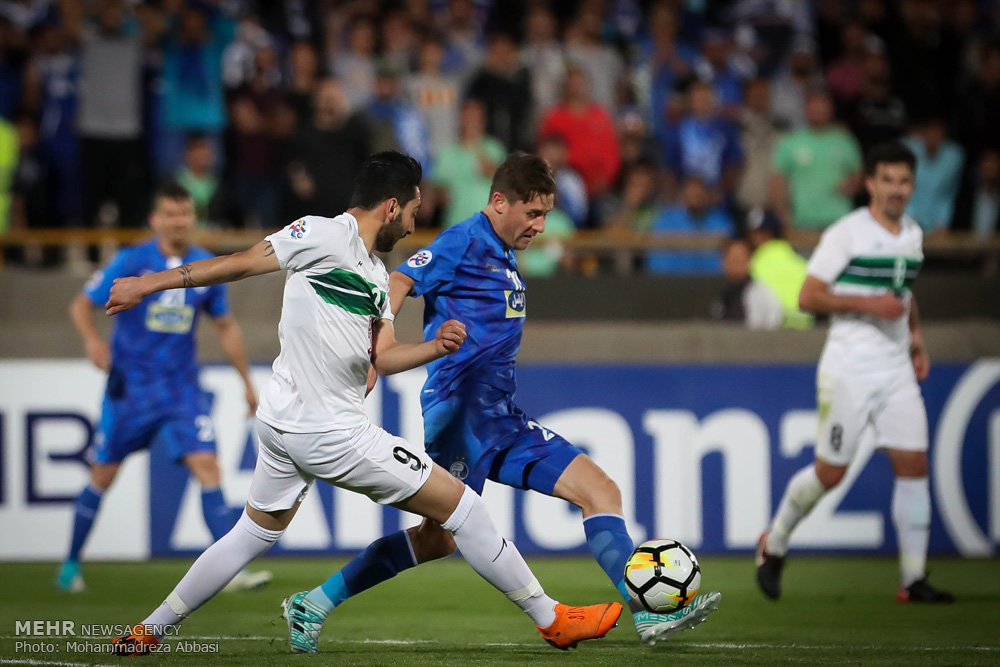
Ataya (left) with Zob Ahan against Esteghlal in 2018

On 16 January 2017, it was announced that Iranian club Zob Ahan had completed the transfer of Ataya. He joined on an 18-month contract for an undisclosed fee, and reunited with fellow Lebanese player Ali Hamam.

=== Ahed ===
On 17 August 2018, Ataya returned to Lebanon, joining reigning champions Ahed in a deal involving Hassan Chaito, Ghazi Honeine, and Hassan Bitar, who moved from Ansar to Ahed.

==== Loan to UiTM ====
On 14 February 2020, Ataya was sent on loan to newly promoted Malaysia Super League club UiTM. He made his debut on 29 February 2020, in a 2–0 defeat to Melaka United. Ataya scored his first goal and made his first assist on 15 March 2020, against PDRM, helping his side win 3–1.

On 26 September 2020, Ataya scored and assisted in a 3–3 draw against Selangor. He finished the season with two goals and two assists in nine games, helping his side reach sixth place in their first season in the top division.

==== Loan to Kedah Darul Aman ====
On 19 November 2020, Ataya moved on loan to league runners-up Kedah Darul Aman for the 2021 season, until November 2021. He made his debut on 5 March 2021, in the opening game of the season – which was also the final of the 2021 Piala Sumbangsih; his team lost 2–0 against Johor Darul Ta'zim.

On 17 and 20 March, Ataya made two assists in two consecutive games, helping his team beat Petaling Jaya City and his former club UiTM. He scored his first goal on 21 August, helping his side win 2–1 against Terengganu. Ataya's second goal came four days later, scoring a long-distance shot off a free kick in a 4–1 win to Petaling Jaya City. He helped Kedah finish in second place, and qualify for the 2022 AFC Cup.

==== Loan to Ajman ====
In January 2022, Ataya moved to UAE Pro League side Ajman on a one-match contract; the nature of the contract is due to the temporary absence of Tunisian midfielder Firas Ben Larbi from Ajman's squad, as he would be competing in the 2021 Africa Cup of Nations. He played the whole 90 minutes in the game against Emirates on 8 January, losing 1–0 at home. He returned to Ahed on 7 February.

=== Nejmeh ===
On 23 March 2023, Ataya joined Nejmeh after the end of the 2022–23 Lebanese Premier League season. He was sent on loan to TP Mazembe in the Congolese Linafoot on 4 July 2023. He returned to Nejmeh in January 2024. In July 2024, Ataya renewed his contract with Nejmeh for three further years.

=== Sagesse ===
In summer 2025, Ataya joined Sagesse.

== International career ==
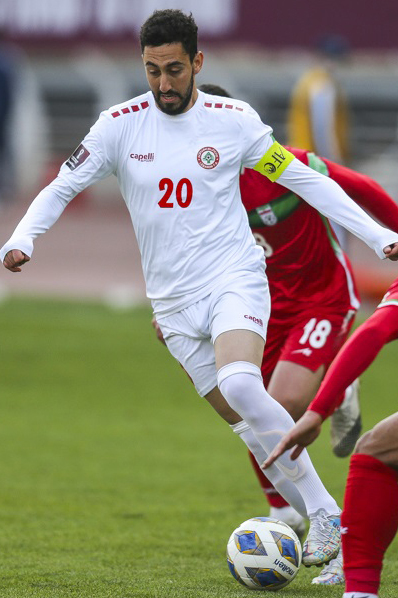
Ataya with Lebanon in 2022

Ataya made his senior international debut for Lebanon on 11 May 2012, in a 4–1 friendly defeat to Egypt. He scored his first goal against Jordan on 31 August 2016. On 13 June 2017, Ataya scored his first international brace in a 2019 AFC Asian Cup qualification match, helping Lebanon beat Malaysia 2–1. Ataya was called up for the 2019 AFC Asian Cup; he featured in two games, against Saudi Arabia and North Korea.

== Style of play ==
Ataya's main qualities are his dribbling and technical ability, alongside his finishing and crossing. He has been likened to Algerian player Riyad Mahrez for his skilful play.

== Career statistics ==
=== International ===
As of match played 15 December 2024

Appearances and goals by national team and year
National team	Year	Apps	Goals
Lebanon	2012	1	0
Lebanon	2013	3	0
Lebanon	2014	2	0
Lebanon	2015	0	0
Lebanon	2016	6	1
Lebanon	2017	6	3
Lebanon	2018	7	0
Lebanon	2019	12	0
Lebanon	2020	0	0
Lebanon	2021	11	1
Lebanon	2022	1	0
Lebanon	2023	0	0
Lebanon	2024	7	0
Total		56	5

Scores and results list Lebanon's goal tally first, score column indicates score after each Ataya goal.

List of international goals scored by Rabih Ataya
No.	Date	Venue	Opponent	Score	Result	Competition
1	31 August 2016	Camille Chamoun Sports City Stadium, Beirut, Lebanon	Jordan	1–0	1–1	Friendly
2	13 June 2017	Tan Sri Dato' Haji Hassan Yunos Stadium, Johor Bahru, Malaysia	Malaysia	1–1	2–1	2019 AFC Asian Cup qualification
3	13 June 2017	Tan Sri Dato' Haji Hassan Yunos Stadium, Johor Bahru, Malaysia	Malaysia	2–1	2–1	2019 AFC Asian Cup qualification
4	10 October 2017	Camille Chamoun Sports City Stadium, Beirut, Lebanon	North Korea	5–0	5–0	2019 AFC Asian Cup qualification
5	9 June 2021	Goyang Stadium, Goyang, South Korea	Turkmenistan	1–1	2–3	2022 FIFA World Cup qualification

== Honours ==
Ansar

- Lebanese FA Cup: 2011–12
- Lebanese Super Cup: 2012

Ahed

- AFC Cup: 2019
- Lebanese Premier League: 2018–19, 2021–22, 2022–23
- Lebanese FA Cup: 2018–19; runner-up: 2022–23
- Lebanese Elite Cup: 2022
- Lebanese Super Cup: 2018, 2019

Kedah Darul Aman

- Piala Sumbangsih runner-up: 2021

Nejmeh

- Lebanese Premier League: 2023–24
- Lebanese Super Cup: 2024

Individual

- Lebanese Premier League Team of the Season: 2015–16
- Lebanese Premier League Best Goal: 2018–19

== See also ==
- List of Lebanon international footballers
