= Walid Shour =

Association football player (born 1996)

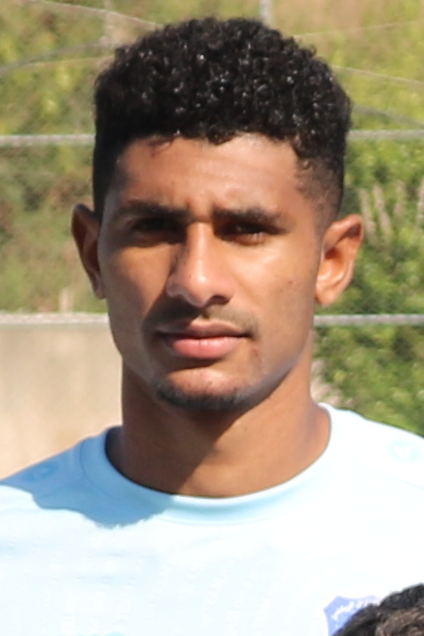
- Shour with Shabab Sahel in 2021

Personal information
- Full name: Walid Adel Shour
- Date of birth: 10 June 1996 (age 30)
- Place of birth: Freetown, Sierra Leone
- Height: 1.85 m (6 ft 1 in)
- Positions: Defensive midfielder; centre-back

Team information
- Current team: Jwaya
- Number: 21

Youth career
- 2010–2011: Kallon
- 2011–2014: Luton Town

Senior career*
Years	Team	Apps	(Gls)
2018–2024	Ahed	51	(4)
2018–2019	→ Racing Beirut (loan)	13	(0)
2021–2022	→ Shabab Sahel (loan)	13	(1)
2024–2025	Brisbane Roar	20	(0)
2025–	Jwaya	20	(2)

International career^{‡}
2021–	Lebanon	41	(1)
- * Club domestic league appearances and goals as of 09:28, 3 August 2026 (UTC) ‡ National team caps and goals as of 4 October 2026

Walid Adel Shour (Arabic: وليد عادل شور; born 10 June 1996) is a footballer who plays as a defensive midfielder or centre-back for Lebanese Premier League club Jwaya. Born in Sierra Leone, he plays for the Lebanon national team.

Starting his senior career at Ahed, he was loaned out to Racing Beirut for one season in 2018–19. Upon his return to Ahed he helped them win the 2019 AFC Cup, before being sent on a one-year loan to Shabab Sahel in 2021–22. In summer 2024, Shour joined Brisbane Roar in Australia.

Shour was called up to represent Sierra Leone internationally at senior level in 2019, without making an appearance. He opted to represent Lebanon, making his senior debut in 2021 and playing at the 2023 AFC Asian Cup.

== Early life ==
Born in Freetown, Sierra Leone, Shour began playing at hometown club Kallon in 2010. In 2011, he moved to English club Luton Town, staying until 2014. Between 2015 and 2018, Shour had been a student at Beihang University while playing amateur football in China, and went on trial at Chinese football clubs Chongqing Lifan and Sichuan Jiuniu. He was named Best Player of the 2016 China International Football League Summer Cup.

== Club career ==
=== Ahed and loans ===
On 27 July 2018, Shour signed for Lebanese Premier League side Ahed; he was sent on loan to Racing Beirut on 11 September. During his time on loan, Shour played 13 league games.

Upon his return to Ahed, Shour played in the cancelled 2019–20 Lebanese Premier League. He played his first game of the 2020–21 season on 4 October 2020, as a starter in a 0–0 league draw against Bourj. Shour scored his first senior goal on 10 April 2021, helping Ahed win 2–1 against Shabab Sahel. Shour also played one game in the 2019 AFC Cup, which Ahed won.

On 7 July 2021, Shour moved to Shabab Sahel on a one-year loan. He played 13 league games and scored once.

=== Brisbane Roar ===
On 25 June 2024, A-League side Brisbane Roar announced the signing of Shour on a two-year deal. Shour made 20 appearances for the Roar in his first season before agreeing a mutual termination of his contract, a year ahead of its expiry.

=== Jwaya ===
On 14 July 2025, Shour joined newly promoted club Jwaya.

== International career ==
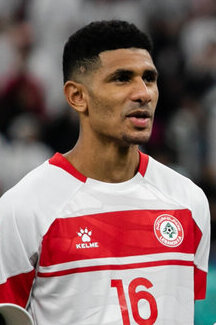
Shour with Lebanon at the 2023 AFC Asian Cup

Born in Sierra Leone to a Lebanese father and a Sierra Leonean mother, Shour was eligible to represent both Sierra Leone and Lebanon internationally. In August 2019, he was called up to Sierra Leone's preliminary squad ahead of the first round of qualification for the 2022 FIFA World Cup, but was eventually dropped from the final selection.

On 2 September 2021, Shour made his international debut for Lebanon in the 2022 FIFA World Cup third qualifying round, coming on as a 90th-minute substitute in a 0–0 away draw to the United Arab Emirates. In December 2023, Shour was included in the Lebanese squad for the 2023 AFC Asian Cup. On 9 October 2025, he scored his first international goal in a 2027 AFC Asian Cup qualification match against Bhutan, helping Lebanon win 2–0.

== Career statistics ==
=== International ===
As of match played 4 October 2026

Appearances and goals by national team and year
National team	Year	Apps	Goals
Lebanon	2021	5	0
Lebanon	2022	1	0
Lebanon	2023	15	0
Lebanon	2024	8	0
Lebanon	2025	9	1
Lebanon	2026	3	0
Total		41	1

Scores and results list Lebanon's goal tally first, score column indicates score after each Shour goal.

List of international goals scored by Walid Shour
No.	Date	Venue	Opponent	Score	Result	Competition
1	9 October 2025	Grand Hamad Stadium, Doha, Qatar	Bhutan	1–0	2–0	2027 AFC Asian Cup qualification

== Honours ==
Ahed

- Lebanese Premier League: 2022–23
- Lebanese Elite Cup: 2022
- Lebanese Super Cup: 2019; runner-up: 2023
- Lebanese FA Cup runner-up: 2022–23, 2023–24
- AFC Cup: 2019; runner-up: 2023–24

== See also ==
- List of Lebanon international footballers born outside Lebanon
