= Mohamad Hebous =

Footballer (born 2001)

Personal information
- Full name: Mohamad Anwar Ali Hebous
- Date of birth: 25 July 2001 (age 25)
- Place of birth: Sidon, Lebanon
- Height: 1.66 m (5 ft 5 in)
- Position: Left winger

Team information
- Current team: Jwaya (on loan from Ansar)
- Number: 7

Youth career
- 2009–2015: FC Saida
- 2015–2019: Ukhuwa Saida

Senior career*
Years	Team	Apps	(Gls)
2019–	Ansar	98	(21)
2026–	→ Jwaya (loan)	0	(0)

International career^{‡}
2025	Palestine	1	(0)
- * Club domestic league appearances and goals as of 2 August 2026 ‡ National team caps and goals as of 10 June 2025

Mohamad Anwar Ali Hebous (Arabic: محمد أنور علي حبوس; born 25 July 2001) is a footballer who plays as a left winger for Lebanese Premier League club Jwaya, on loan from Ansar. Born in Lebanon, he has played for the Palestine national team.

== Early life ==
Hebous was born in Sidon, Lebanon, to a Palestinian father and a Lebanese mother. His father's family originated from Sa'sa', near Safad, and left the village during the Nakba in 1948.

== Club career ==
=== Youth ===
Hebous started playing football aged seven in his local neighbourhood. At age eight, he joined FC Saida's youth academy. Six years later, aged 14, Hebous joined Ukhuwa Saida, a club playing in an amateur "Palestinian diaspora" league in Lebanon. He also spent part of his youth at Romanista Football Academy.

=== Ansar ===
In 2019, at age 18, Hebous joined Ansar. By January 2021, he was described as one of the club's Palestinian stars and said he was working to improve his technical and physical level in pursuit of a call-up to either the Lebanon or Palestine national teams. He subsequently spent about a year away from the club before returning to training in January 2022, and formally rejoined the squad in March ahead of the league championship play-off stage. He scored his first goal of the 2022–23 Lebanese Premier League season in Ansar's 3–0 victory over Akhaa Ahli Aley on 30 October 2022.

In September 2023, Hebous briefly stopped training because of internal issues at the club, but returned to team training after the matter was resolved. He scored in several important matches during the 2023–24 season, including goals against Ahed in February and Racing Beirut in May 2024. In March 2024, he told Ad-Diyar that manager Youssef El Johary had restored his confidence and that he intended to remain with Ansar. On 7 April 2025, Hebous renewed his contract with Ansar until 2028.

==== Loan to Jwaya ====
On 6 August 2026, Hebous was sent on a two-year loan to Jwaya.

== International career ==
Hebous earned his first call-up to the Palestine national team in June 2025, making his debut in a 2026 FIFA World Cup qualification match against Kuwait.

In October 2026, Palestinian national team coach Ihab Abu Jazar declared that Hebous will not be summoned again to the national team because of "the player's unwillingness to travel," noting that he had declined several call-ups to the Olympic team since 2021.

== Honours ==
Ansar

- Lebanese Premier League: 2020–21, 2024–25, 2025–26
- Lebanese FA Cup: 2020–21, 2023–24
- Lebanese Elite Cup: 2022
- Lebanese Super Cup: 2021
