= Wehbi Fawaz =

Lebanese footballer (born 2006)

Personal information
- Full name: Wehbi Jihad Fawaz
- Date of birth: 5 May 2006 (age 20)
- Place of birth: Abidjan, Ivory Coast
- Height: 1.85 m (6 ft 1 in)
- Positions: Attacking midfielder; winger

Team information
- Current team: Jwaya
- Number: 15

Youth career
- –2024: Tawfeer (Note: Sporting Qlaileh changed its name to Tawfeer in January 2024.)

Senior career*
Years	Team	Apps	(Gls)
2021	Sporting Qlaileh	1	(0)
2025	Atlas Paillade		
2025–	Jwaya	21	(2)

International career^{‡}
2026–	Lebanon	4	(0)
- * Club domestic league appearances and goals as of 19 September 2026 ‡ National team caps and goals as of 17 November 2026

Wehbi Jihad Fawaz (Arabic: وهبي جهاد فواز; born 5 May 2006) is a footballer who plays as an attacking midfielder or winger for Lebanese Premier League club Jwaya. Born in the Ivory Coast, he plays for the Lebanon national team.

== Early life ==
Fawaz was born and raised in the Marcory suburb of Abidjan, Ivory Coast, to a Lebanese family originally from Jwaya.

== Club career ==
Fawaz began his youth career at Sporting Qlaileh, making one senior appearance in the 2021–22 Lebanese Second Division, before the club changed its name to Tawfeer in January 2024. In January 2025, he signed for French club Atlas Paillade in the Régional 1, and also played at university level, winning the French University Championship in Montpellier.

In July 2025, Fawaz returned to Lebanon, signing for hometown club Jwaya. On 18 October 2025, Fawaz scored his first goal for Jwaya in a 5–0 win against Racing Beirut.

== International career ==
Fawaz was called up to the Lebanon national under-23 team for training camps in February and September 2026.

Fawaz received his first call-up to the Lebanon national team from head coach Madjid Bougherra in September 2026, ahead of friendly matches against the Maldives and Kyrgyzstan in October. He made his debut on 1 October, providing two assists to Ali Kassas in a 6–0 win against the Maldives, becoming the first player to record two assists on his international debut for Lebanon.

== Style of play ==
Fawaz plays in midfield. He has been described as having good game awareness, quick decision-making and technical ability, while also being noted for his physical strength and ability to contribute to attacking moves.

== Career statistics ==
=== Club ===
As of match played 19 September 2026

Appearances and goals by club, season and competition
Club	Season	League			Lebanon Cup		Other		Total	
Club	Season	Division	Apps	Goals	Apps	Goals	Apps	Goals	Apps	Goals
Sporting Qlaileh	Lebanese Second Division	2021–22	1	0	—		—		1	0
Jwaya	Lebanese Premier League	2025–26	21	2	1	0	1 (Note: Appearance in National Solidarity Tournament)	0	23	2
Jwaya	Lebanese Premier League	2026–27	0	0	3	1	—		3	1
Jwaya	Total		21	2	4	1	1	0	26	3
Career total			22	2	4	1	1	0	27	3

=== International ===
As of match played 17 November 2026

Appearances and goals by national team and year
National team	Year	Apps	Goals
Lebanon	2026	4	0
Total		4	0

== See also ==
- List of Lebanon international footballers born outside Lebanon
