= Hussein Sharafeddine =

Lebanese footballer (born 1997)

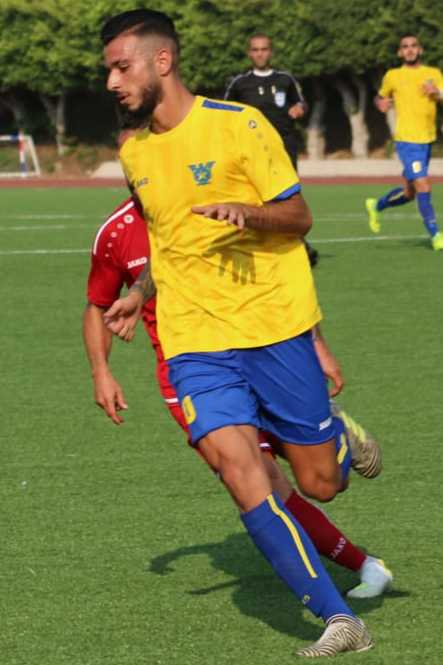
- Sharafeddine with Safa in 2019

Personal information
- Full name: Hussein Hamid Sharafeddine
- Date of birth: 13 October 1997 (age 29)
- Place of birth: Baalbek, Lebanon
- Position: Centre-back

Team information
- Current team: Jwaya
- Number: 30

Senior career*
Years	Team	Apps	(Gls)
2016–2022	Nejmeh	20	(0)
2019–2020	→ Safa (loan)	0	(0)
2020	→ Sevan (loan)	6	(0)
2021	→ Naft Al-Basra (loan)	5	(0)
2021–2022	→ Safa (loan)	14	(0)
2022–2026	Safa	53	(1)
2026–	Jwaya	0	(0)

International career^{‡}
2017	Lebanon U20		
2019	Lebanon U23	3	(0)
2024–	Lebanon	5	(0)
- * Club domestic league appearances and goals as of 09:33, 3 August 2026 (UTC) ‡ National team caps and goals as of 26 November 2025

Hussein Hamid Sharafeddine (Arabic: حسين حميد شرف الدين; born 13 October 1997) is a Lebanese professional footballer who plays as a centre-back for Lebanese Premier League club Jwaya and the Lebanon national team.

== Club career ==
=== Nejmeh ===
==== Loan to Sevan ====
On 9 September 2020, Sharafeddine moved to Sevan in the Armenian First League. Sharafeddine made his debut on 13 September, in a 4–1 win over Ararat-2. He played six league games and one Armenian Cup game in the first half of the season, and returned to Lebanon on 26 December due to the Nagorno-Karabakh war.

==== Loan to Naft Al-Basra ====
On 8 February 2021, Sharafeddine joined Iraqi Premier League side Naft Al-Basra. He made his debut on 14 February, but was subbed out for injury; the match ended in a 1–1 draw to Al-Naft. Sharafeddine decided to end his contract on 16 May, and returned to Lebanon after having played five league games.

==== Loan to Safa ====
Following his loan in Iraq, Shafareddine was loaned out to Safa for the 2021–22 Lebanese Premier League, playing 14 league games. He then returned to Nejmeh from his loan in July 2022, and renewed his contract in August 2022.

=== Safa ===
Following Nejmeh's termination of Sharefeddine's contract after the first half of the 2022–23 Lebanese Premier League, the player returned to Safa in December 2022. On 31 May 2024, Sharafeddine renewed his contract with Safa for three years, until 2027.

=== Jwaya ===
On 13 August 2026, Sharafeddine joined Jwaya.

== International career ==
In June 2017, Sharafeddine was called up to the Lebanon national under-20 team for the 2017 Jeux de la Francophonie.

Sharafeddine made his international debut for Lebanon on 26 March 2024, as a starter in a 5–0 defeat to Australia in the 2026 FIFA World Cup qualifiers.

== Career statistics ==
=== International ===
As of match played 26 November 2025

Appearances and goals by national team and year
National team	Year	Apps	Goals
Lebanon	2024	2	0
Lebanon	2025	3	0
Total		5	0

== Honours ==
Nejmeh

- Lebanese Elite Cup: 2016, 2017, 2018
- Lebanese Super Cup: 2016
