= Kassem El Zein =

Lebanese footballer (born 1990)

- El Zein with Lebanon in 2024

Personal information
- Full name: Kassem Mohammed El Zein
- Date of birth: 2 December 1990 (age 35)
- Place of birth: Maarakeh, Lebanon
- Height: 1.80 m (5 ft 11 in)
- Position: Defender

Team information
- Current team: Nejmeh
- Number: 18

Youth career
- Nejmeh

Senior career*
Years	Team	Apps	(Gls)
2011–	Nejmeh	226	(18)
2020	→ Al-Mina'a (loan)	4	(0)
2020–2021	→ Al-Nasr (loan)	17	(1)

International career
2014–2025	Lebanon	56	(2)
- * Club domestic league appearances and goals as of 09:29, 3 August 2026 (UTC)

Kassem Mohammed El Zein (Arabic: قاسم محمد الزين, Lebanese Arabic pronunciation: [ˈʔæːsim mˈħammad zˈzeːn]; born 2 December 1990) is a Lebanese footballer who plays as a defender for Lebanese Premier League club Nejmeh, whom he captains.

El Zein began his senior career in 2011 at Nejmeh, playing over 100 league matches. In 2020 he was sent on loan, to Iraqi club Al-Mina'a and Kuwaiti club Al-Nasr, respectively. El Zein made his international debut for Lebanon in 2014, and was part of the 2019 and 2023 AFC Asian Cup squads.

== Club career ==
=== Al-Mina'a ===
On 28 January 2020, El Zein was sent on a three-month loan to Iraqi Premier League side Al-Mina'a. He made his debut on 17 February 2020, in a 1–0 home win over Naft Al-Janoob in the first matchday of the season. El Zein played four league games for Al-Mina'a; however, the season was cancelled due to the COVID-19 pandemic.

=== Al-Nasr ===
On 18 June 2020, El Zein was sent on a one-year loan to Kuwaiti club Al-Nasr. He made his debut on 16 October, in a 2–1 win against Al-Shabab in the classification league between Kuwait Premier League and Kuwaiti Division One clubs. El Zein helped his side finish first in the qualifying stage.

His debut in the 2020–21 Kuwaiti Premier League came on 22 January 2021, in a 1–0 away win against Al-Shabab. El Zein scored a goal on 25 April, helping his side to a 2–1 away win against Al-Fahaheel. He finished the season with 17 league games.

=== Nejmeh ===
El Zein returned to Nejmeh for the 2021–22 season. His contract was renewed in 2022. On 30 June 2024, El Zein scored the decisive goal in the 95th minute in the last game of the 2023–24 Lebanese Premier League against rivals Ansar, allowing Nejmeh to win the league for the first time in 10 years.

== International career ==
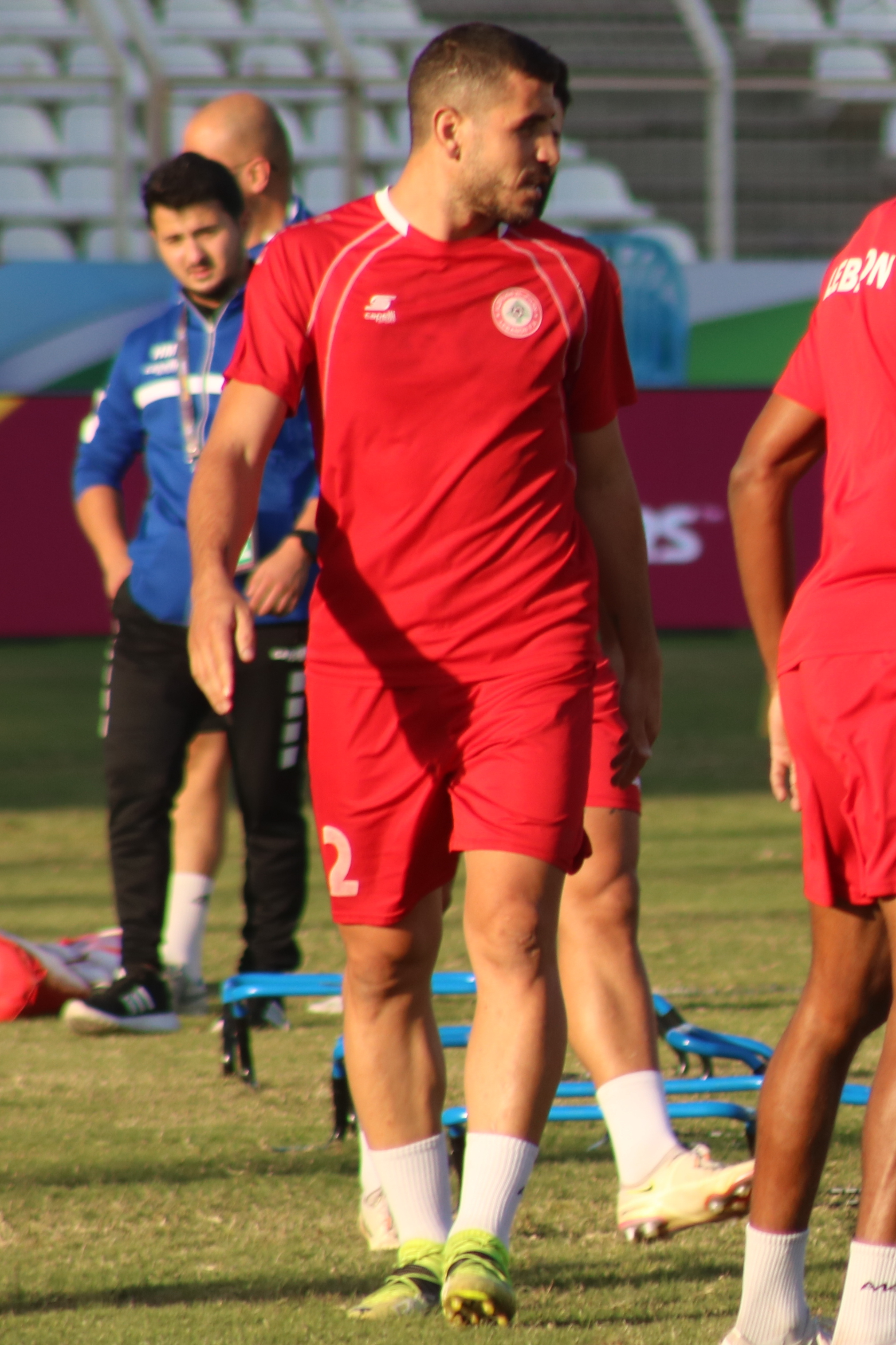
El Zein training with the Lebanon national team in 2021

El Zein was first called up to the Lebanon national team in October 2014, as part of a mixed squad of senior and Olympic players for friendly matches against Qatar and Saudi Arabia. He made his on 14 October 2014, against Saudi Arabia.

In December 2018, he was called up for the 2019 AFC Asian Cup, where he played a group stage game against Saudi Arabia. El Zein scored his first international goal against India on 10 September 2023, to help Lebanon finish third in the 2023 King's Cup. In December 2023, El Zein was included in the Lebanese squad for the 2023 AFC Asian Cup.

Following Lebanon's missed qualification to the 2027 AFC Asian Cup, following a 2–0 defeat to Yemen on 4 June 2026, El Zein announced his retirement from the national team.

== Style of play ==
Initially starting out as a full-back, El Zein progressed into a centre-back with the years; his main abilities are his tackling and reading of the game.

== Personal life ==
As of 2019, El Zein was working as a part-time chef at L'Avenue Du Parc, a restaurant in Beirut. He stated that "while in other countries football can be a full-time job, in Lebanon it is necessary for a player to have a second job."

El Zein's favourite club is Manchester United, while his favourite player is former Manchester United defender Nemanja Vidić.

== Career statistics ==
=== International ===
As of match played 26 November 2025

Appearances and goals by national team and year
National team	Year	Apps	Goals
Lebanon	2014	1	0
Lebanon	2015	0	0
Lebanon	2016	0	0
Lebanon	2017	4	0
Lebanon	2018	7	0
Lebanon	2019	7	0
Lebanon	2020	0	0
Lebanon	2021	10	0
Lebanon	2022	3	0
Lebanon	2023	7	1
Lebanon	2024	12	1
Lebanon	2025	5	0
Total		56	2

Scores and results list Lebanon's goal tally first, score column indicates score after each El Zein goal.

List of international goals scored by Kassem El Zein
No.	Date	Venue	Opponent	Score	Result	Competition
1	10 September 2023	700th Anniversary Stadium, Chiang Mai, Thailand	India	1–0	1–0	2023 King's Cup
2	12 December 2024	Hamad bin Khalifa Stadium, Doha, Qatar	Kuwait	1–1	2–1	Friendly

== Honours ==
Nejmeh

- Lebanese Premier League: 2013–14, 2023–24
- Lebanese FA Cup: 2015–16, 2021–22, 2022–23, 2025–26
- Lebanese Elite Cup: 2014, 2016, 2017, 2018, 2021
- Lebanese Super Cup: 2014, 2016, 2023, 2024

Individual

- Lebanese Premier League Team of the Season: 2018–19
