= 2024–25 Lebanese Second Division =

Lebanese Second Division
- Season: 2024–25
- Dates: 20 September 2024 – 6 June 2025
- Champions: Jwaya
- Promoted: Jwaya; Mabarra
- Relegated: Wehda Saadnayel; Nahda Barelias
- Matches: 105
- Goals: 274 (2.61 per match)
- Top goalscorer: Karim Tarhini (14 goals)

The Lebanese Second Division (Arabic: الدوري اللبناني الدرجة الثانية) is the second division of Lebanese football. It is controlled by the Lebanese Football Association. The top two teams are promoted to the Lebanese Premier League, while the bottom teams are relegated to the Lebanese Third Division.

== Summary ==
The league was played between 20 September 2024 and 6 June 2025. Jwaya won the league for the first time, while Mabarra finished second; both were promoted to the Lebanese Premier League. Jwaya secured the championship on the final matchday with a 2–0 victory over Tripoli, while Mabarra lost 6–4 to Okhwa Kharayeb. Jwaya finished with 33 points, four points ahead of Mabarra on 29. Nahda Barelias finished bottom of the relegation round and were relegated to the Lebanese Third Division. Wehda Saadnayel withdrew from the competition without playing a match. Karim Tarhini of Okhwa Kharayeb was the league's top scorer with 14 goals.

The season was played in two phases. The 11 active teams first played each other once, after which the league was divided into a promotion round and a relegation round. The top six teams advanced to the promotion round, while the remaining five active teams entered the relegation round. The results from the first phase were carried over into the second phase. Wehda Saadnayel withdrew before playing a match and therefore did not participate in either round.

== League table ==
Pos	Team	Pld	W	D	L	GF	GA	GD	Pts	Promotion or relegation (Note: Teams played each other once (10 matches), before the league was split into two groups (the top six and the bottom five). Teams in the promotion group played each other twice (10 matches), while teams in the relegation group played each other twice (8 matches). Teams carried over their results from the first phase into the second phase.)
1	Jwaya (C, P)	20	12	5	3	34	14	+20	41	Promotion to Lebanese Premier League
2	Mabarra (P)	20	10	7	3	32	20	+12	37	Promotion to Lebanese Premier League
3	Ahli Nabatieh	20	8	7	5	27	24	+3	31	
4	Okhwa Kharayeb	20	7	6	7	39	35	+4	27	
5	Tripoli	20	5	8	7	22	25	−3	23	
6	Salam Zgharta	20	6	4	10	15	26	−11	22	
7	BFA Sporting	18	6	7	5	26	22	+4	25	
8	Rissala Toura	18	6	5	7	22	27	−5	23	
9	Akhaa Ahli Aley	18	5	7	6	19	18	+1	22	
10	Irshad Chehim	18	5	4	9	19	29	−10	19	
11	Nahda Barelias (R)	18	3	4	11	19	34	−15	13	Relegation to Lebanese Third Division
12	Wehda Saadnayel (Note: Wehda Saadnayel withdrew and did not play a match.) (R)	0	0	0	0	0	0	0	0	Withdraw

Source: Global Sports Archive
Rules for classification: 1) Points; 2) Head-to-head points; 3) Head-to-head goal difference; 4) Goal difference; 5) Goals scored; 6) Draw.
(C) Champions; (P) Promoted; (R) Relegated

== Goalscorers ==
Rank	Player	Club	Goals
1	(Lebanon) Karim Tarhini	Okhwa Kharayeb	14
2	(Nigeria) Stephen Ayuba	BFA Sporting	10
2	(Ghana) Bismark Asante	Mabarra	10
4	(Nigeria) Stephen Uzoma Chinonso	Rissala Toura	8
5	(Senegal) Adramé Diallo	Jwaya	7
5	(Ivory Coast) Chris-Calvin Nawatta	Ahli Nabatieh	7
7	(Lebanon) Mohammad Yehya	Okhwa Kharayeb	6
8	(Lebanon) Fouad Eid	Tripoli	5
8	(Lebanon) Ali Alhadi Reda	Ahli Nabatieh	5
8	(Brazil) Vinícius Calamari	Jwaya	5
8	(Lebanon) Mohammad Jawad	Jwaya	5
8	(Nigeria) Robert Odu	Jwaya	5
8	(Senegal) Baba Cissé	Mabarra	5
