= 2023 Lebanese Federation Cup =

Tournament details
- Country: Lebanon
- Dates: 1–23 July 2023
- Teams: 12

Final positions
- Champions: Ahed (2nd title)
- Runners-up: Ahli Nabatieh

Tournament statistics
- Matches played: 15
- Goals scored: 32 (2.13 per match)
- Top goal scorer: Lee Erwin (5 goals)

The 2023 Lebanese Federation Cup was the sixth season of the Lebanese Federation Cup. The competition, held as a preparatory tournament prior to the start of the 2023–24 Lebanese Premier League season, was open to all clubs participating in the Lebanese Premier League. It started on 1 July 2023, and ended on 23 July with the final.

After a 19-year hiatus, the competition was held for the first time since the 2004 edition. In 2023, the Lebanese Federation Cup replaced the Lebanese Elite Cup and Lebanese Challenge Cup as the pre-season preparatory tournament. Ahed won the title, after defeating Ahli Nabatieh 4–0 in the final.

== Format ==
The first phase consisted of four groups of three teams, with the top four clubs of the previous league season as the seeded teams. The top-ranked team of each group qualified for the semi-finals; the two winners qualified for the final. A penalty shoot-out was held in the case of a tie after 90 minutes in the knockout stages.

In the competition, teams were allowed to register 10 players, with no limit of nationality, who were outside the club's player list. The rules also allowed for the registration of players from other clubs, provided they had obtained written approval from their clubs.

== Group stage ==
=== Group A ===
Pos	Team	Pld	W	D	L	GF	GA	GD	Pts	Qualification
1	Ahli Nabatieh	2	1	1	0	2	1	+1	4	Qualification for the semi-finals
2	Tripoli	2	0	2	0	1	1	0	2	
3	Shabab Sahel	2	0	1	1	0	1	−1	1	

Source: Global Sports Archive
1 July 2023
17:00 UTC+3

Shabab Sahel	0–0	Tripoli
	Report

Safa Stadium, Beirut
Referee: Ali Chamas

6 July 2023
17:00 UTC+3

Ahli Nabatieh	1–0	Shabab Sahel
Sbeity 43'	Report

Al Ahed Stadium, Beirut
Referee: Maher Al Ali

11 July 2023
17:00 UTC+3

Tripoli	1–1	Ahli Nabatieh
Youssef 90'	Report	Awada 27'

Al Ahed Stadium, Beirut
Referee: Samer Kassem

=== Group B ===
Pos	Team	Pld	W	D	L	GF	GA	GD	Pts	Qualification
1	Ahed	2	2	0	0	7	0	+7	6	Qualification for the semi-finals
2	Sagesse	2	0	1	1	0	2	−2	1	
3	Chabab Ghazieh	2	0	1	1	0	5	−5	1	

Source: Global Sports Archive
2 July 2023
17:00 UTC+3

Chabab Ghazieh	0–0	Sagesse
	Report

Amin Abdelnour Stadium, Bhamdoun
Referee: Wael Haidar

7 July 2023
17:00 UTC+3

Sagesse	0–2	Ahed
	Report	Erwin 45+1', 90+5'

Safa Stadium, Beirut
Referee: Ali Chamas

11 July 2023
17:00 UTC+3

Ahed	5–0	Chabab Ghazieh
Farran 5'; Erwin 43', 90+4'; Nasser 60'; Haidar 84'	Report

Amin Abdelnour Stadium, Bhamdoun
Referee: Mohamad Haddad

=== Group C ===
Pos	Team	Pld	W	D	L	GF	GA	GD	Pts	Qualification
1	Racing Beirut	2	1	1	0	5	4	+1	4	Qualification for the semi-finals
2	Ansar	2	1	0	1	4	4	0	3	
3	Tadamon Sour	2	0	1	1	1	2	−1	1	

Source: Global Sports Archive
1 July 2023
17:00 UTC+3

Ansar	1–0	Tadamon Sour
Tall 51'	Report

Ansar Stadium, Ansar
Referee: Ahmad Alaeddin

7 July 2023
17:00 UTC+3

Racing Beirut	4–3	Ansar
Kdouh 9', 11', 38'; Haidar 50' (pen.)	Report	Al Haj 34', 37'; Tall 51'

Amin Abdelnour Stadium, Bhamdoun
Referee: Wael Haidar

11 July 2023
17:00 UTC+3

Tadamon Sour	1–1	Racing Beirut
Ezzeddine 38'	Report	Kdouh 35' (pen.)

Kfarjoz Municipal Stadium, Kfar Jouz
Referee: Ali Chamas

=== Group D ===
Pos	Team	Pld	W	D	L	GF	GA	GD	Pts	Qualification
1	Nejmeh	2	1	1	0	2	0	+2	4	Qualification for the semi-finals
2	Bourj	2	0	2	0	1	1	0	2	
3	Safa	2	0	1	1	1	3	−2	1	

Source: Global Sports Archive
1 July 2023
17:00 UTC+3

Nejmeh	0–0	Bourj
	Report

Amin Abdelnour Stadium, Bhamdoun
Referee: Ali Al Ashkar

6 July 2023
17:00 UTC+3

Safa	0–2	Nejmeh
	Report	Markabawi 59'; Sabra 71'

Amin Abdelnour Stadium, Bhamdoun
Referee: Mohamad Haddad

12 July 2023
17:00 UTC+3

Bourj	1–1	Safa
Louati 90+6'	Report	Bruijn 42'

Amin Abdelnour Stadium, Bhamdoun
Referee: Ali Al Ashkar

== Knockout stage ==
=== Bracket ===
The following is the bracket which the knockout stage of the Lebanese Federation Cup resembles. Numbers in parentheses next to the score represents the results of a penalty shoot-out.

Semi-finals; 17–18 July 2023
Racing Beirut	0 (4)
Ahli Nabatieh	0 (5)
Ahed	3
Nejmeh	1

Final; 23 July 2023
Ahli Nabatieh	0
Ahed	4

=== Semi-finals ===
17 July 2023
17:00 UTC+3

Racing Beirut	0–0	Ahli Nabatieh
	Report
Penalties
	4–5

Al Ahed Stadium, Beirut

18 July 2023
17:00 UTC+3

Ahed	3–1	Nejmeh
Darwich 4', 58'; Dakik 63'	Report	Kourani 81'

Amin Abdelnour Stadium, Bhamdoun

=== Final ===
23 July 2023
16:30 UTC+3

Ahli Nabatieh	0–4	Ahed
	Report	Fahes 4' (o.g.); Farran 29'; Erwin 38'; Brown 46' (o.g.)

Fouad Chehab Stadium, Jounieh

== See other ==
- 2023–24 Lebanese Premier League
- 2023–24 Lebanese FA Cup
- 2023 Lebanese Super Cup
