= Jwaya SC =

Lebanese association football club

Jwaya
- Full name: Jwaya Sporting Club
- Founded: 1963; 63 years ago, as Bint Jbeil FC
- Ground: Mohamad Said Saad Stadium
- Capacity: 6,500
- Chairman: Wissam Saad
- Manager: Miloud Hamdi
- League: Lebanese Premier League
- 2025–26: Lebanese Premier League, 3rd of 12
| Home colours | Away colours |

Jwaya Sports Club (Arabic: نادي جويا الرياضي), commonly referred to as Jwaya, is a football club based in Jwaya, South Governorate, Lebanon. Founded in 1963 as Bint Jbeil FC, the club competes in the Lebanese Premier League, the top tier of Lebanese football. They achieved promotion to the top flight for the first time in 2025.

== History ==
=== Bint Jbeil ===
Bint Jbeil FC was established in 1963, representing the city of Bint Jbeil in southern Lebanon. In the 2010s, Bint Jbeil competed in the Lebanese Third Division, including during the 2017–18 season, when it reached the qualification round for promotion to the Second Division.

Bint Jbeil reached the Lebanese Second Division for the first time in 2022 after finishing second in the promotion playoff of the 2021–22 Lebanese Third Division, behind Riyadi Abbasiyah. The decisive match ended in a goalless draw between the two teams, securing promotion for both clubs. In its first Second Division season, Bint Jbeil competed near the top of the table and entered the promotion playoff, but ultimately failed to secure promotion to the Lebanese Premier League.

In the 2023–24 season, Bint Jbeil again challenged for promotion. It finished the first phase in second place and entered the promotion playoff, where it remained in contention alongside Riyadi Abbasiyah, Mabarra and Shabab Baalbek. Bint Jbeil won several matches in the playoff, including a 3–1 victory over Akhaa Ahli Aley in February 2024, but Riyadi Abbasiyah ultimately won the division and secured promotion.

The club subsequently faced financial and logistical difficulties as fighting in southern Lebanon affected Bint Jbeil and prevented the team from regularly training at its home ground. Players reported having to travel to other towns to find suitable training facilities, including using mini-football pitches in Tyre.

=== Jwaya ===
Following financial and logistical difficulties faced by the club, particularly after the Israeli attacks on southern Lebanon, head coach Hussein Soufan oversaw its relocation to Jwaya in 2024. With support from the Saad family, including future club president Wissam Saad, the club was restructured and renamed Jwaya SC.

Ahead of the 2024–25 season, the club signed experienced players including Ali Hamam, Adnan Melhem, and Karim Abou Zeid, aiming for promotion to the Lebanese Premier League. Jwaya won the Lebanese Second Division with 30 points, finishing ahead of Mabarra to secure promotion to the Lebanese Premier League for the first time.

Before the 2025–26 season, Jwaya appointed Youssef Al Jawhari as head coach after he had led Ansar to the league title. The club also signed Lebanon internationals Walid Shour, Hasan Srour, Zein Farran, and, most notably, Hassan Maatouk. In their first season in the Premier League, Jwaya finished third after drawing 2–2 with Ahed on the final matchday.

== Crest and colours ==
In 2025, Jwaya introduced a new club crest as part of a rebranding. The new design features the letter "J", a star and a shield. The club also adopted gold and white as its colours.

== Players ==
=== Current squad ===
As of 7 November 2026

Note: Flags indicate national team as defined under FIFA eligibility rules; some limited exceptions apply. Players may hold more than one non-FIFA nationality.

| No. | Pos. | Nation | Player |
|---|---|---|---|
| 1 | GK | LBN | Ali Sabeh |
| 2 | MF | LBN | Badreddine Kawam |
| 3 | FW | LBN | Hassan Kaafarani |
| 4 | DF | LBN | Hasan Farhat |
| 5 | MF | LBN | Jihad Ayoub |
| 6 | MF | LBN | Hussein Monzer |
| 7 | MF | PLE | Mohamad Hebous (on loan from Ansar) |
| 8 | MF | LBN | Hasan Srour |
| 9 | FW | COD | Jonathan Bolingi |
| 10 | FW | LBN | Hassan Maatouk (captain) |
| 11 | MF | NGR | Morice Chukwu |
| 14 | FW | SEN | Djibril Guèye |
| 15 | MF | LBN | Wehbi Fawaz |
| 17 | MF | LBN | Said Saad |

| No. | Pos. | Nation | Player |
|---|---|---|---|
| 18 | FW | LBN | Hassan Fouani |
| 19 | FW | LBN | Hassan Bazzi |
| 20 | FW | LBN | Ali Fakieh |
| 21 | MF | COD | Jean Benoît Tukumbane |
| 22 | MF | LBN | Walid Shour |
| 24 | GK | LBN | Hadi Mortada |
| 27 | FW | LBN | Jeme Kazan |
| 30 | DF | LBN | Hussein Sharafeddine |
| 40 | MF | COD | Jonathan Kanu |
| 71 | FW | LBN | Zein Farran |
| 77 | DF | LBN | Said Awada |
| — | DF | LBN | Mohamad Safwan |
| — | DF | COD | Ordy Simete |

== Coaching staff ==
| Position | Staff |
|---|---|
| Sporting director | (Lebanon) Abbas Zeidan |
| Team manager | (Lebanon) Hassan Hammoud |
| Head coach | (Algeria) Miloud Hamdi |
| Assistant head coach | (Algeria) Mohamed Aymen Hbibi |
| Performance analyst | (Algeria) Nizar Ben Atitallah |
| Fitness coach | (Algeria) Khaled El-Said |
| Head of goalkeeping | (Lebanon) Khaled Homsi |
| Head of medical staff | (Lebanon) Ibrahim Al-Abed |
| Physio assistant | (Lebanon) Mohamad Jaafar |
| Photographer | (Lebanon) Ali Baflani |
| Youth director | (Lebanon) Khalil Watfa |

== Honours ==
- Lebanese Second Division
  - Winners (1): 2024–25

== See also ==
- List of football clubs in Lebanon
