= 2025–26 Lebanese Premier League =

64th season of the Lebanese Premier League

Lebanese Premier League
- Season: 2025–26
- Dates: 19 September 2025 – 2 August 2026
- Champions: Ansar (16th title)
- Relegated: Bourj; Racing Beirut
- AFC Challenge League: Ansar; Nejmeh
- Matches: 139
- Goals: 333 (2.4 per match)
- Top goalscorer: Hicham Khalf Allah (18 goals)
- Best goalkeeper: Mostafa Matar (15 clean sheets)
- Biggest win: Jwaya 7–0 Racing Beirut (18 October 2025); Mabarra 0–7 Ansar (29 June 2026)
- Highest scoring: Jwaya 7–0 Racing Beirut (18 October 2025); Racing Beirut 1–6 Safa (2 December 2025); Mabarra 0–7 Ansar (29 June 2026)

The 2025–26 Lebanese Premier League was the 64th season of the Lebanese Premier League, the top Lebanese league for football clubs since its establishment in 1934.

The season began on 19 September 2025. Following the outbreak of the 2026 Lebanon war, the Lebanese Football Association (LFA) suspended all football activities on 18 March 2026. The LFA subsequently announced that league competitions would resume in May following a ceasefire, but the Premier League ultimately resumed on 12 June. The season concluded on 2 August, with Ansar defeating Nejmeh 2–1 in the final matchday to secure their 16th league title.

On 4 May, the LFA launched the National Solidarity Tournament, a preparatory tournament for the top six teams of the suspended Premier League. It was intended to provide players with competitive matches before the Lebanon national team's 2027 AFC Asian Cup qualification match against Yemen. The tournament was held from 12 to 21 May.

== Summary ==
=== Regulations ===
The Lebanese Football Association (LFA) retained the requirement for clubs to give playing time to under-21 players. Each club was required to give at least one player under the age of 21 a minimum of 750 minutes of playing time during the season, while two such players were required to accumulate 1,200 minutes between them. A club that failed to meet the required playing-time quotas was subject to a three-point deduction from its league total.

The limit of foreign players remained at four per club, having been increased from three beginning with the 2023–24 season. The video assistant referee (VAR) system had been introduced to the Premier League during the second half of the 2023–24 season.

=== Format ===
The LFA announced a new competition format for the 2025–26 season in July 2025. The regular stage was scheduled to be played on a home-and-away basis, after which each club's points total would be halved. The four highest-ranked teams were then to enter a championship group, while the next four teams were to enter a relegation group. Both groups were scheduled to be played over two rounds, with each team facing the other teams in its group home and away.

The announced format was subsequently affected by the withdrawal of Bourj during the regular stage. The LFA ruled that Bourj would be placed last in the 2025–26 league and relegated to the Lebanese Second Division for the following season. After Bourj's withdrawal, its remaining fixtures were cancelled and the regular stage continued with the other 11 clubs. The remaining clubs played one another twice, while each played Bourj once before its withdrawal. Following the regular stage, the LFA placed the four highest-ranked active clubs in the championship group and the three lowest-ranked active clubs in the relegation group. Bourj had already been relegated following its withdrawal.

The championship group was played over two rounds, with each team playing the other three teams twice, for six additional matches per team. The relegation group consisted of three teams, with each team playing the other two teams twice, for four additional matches per team. Points carried over from the regular stage were calculated as half of each club's total, with fractions rounded upwards. Ansar won the championship group and the 2025–26 Lebanese Premier League title. Lebanon was allocated two direct places in the 2026–27 AFC Challenge League, with the league champion and runner-up occupying the country's two league places.

== Teams ==
Twelve teams competed in the league – the top ten teams from the previous season and the two teams promoted from the Lebanese Second Division. The promoted teams were Jwaya, who played their first season in the Lebanese Premier League, and Mabarra, who returned to the top flight after an absence of 11 years. They replaced Chabab Ghazieh and Shabab Baalbek, who were relegated to the Lebanese Second Division after respective spells of three and one years in the top flight.

=== Stadiums and locations ===
Locations of the 2025–26 Lebanese Premier League teams
Beirut Lebanese Premier League clubs

The following table lists teams in alphabetical order. Locations refer to where the clubs were based, not necessarily where their stadiums were. The stadiums listed are where clubs typically trained, but are not necessarily club-owned. League games were usually held in a few neutral stadiums, which may have differed from those listed.

Team	Location	Stadium
Ahed	Beirut (Ouzai)	Al Ahed Stadium
Ansar	Beirut (Tariq el-Jdideh)	Al Ansar Stadium
Bourj	Beirut (Bourj el-Barajneh)	Bourj el-Barajneh Stadium
Jwaya	Jwaya	Mohamad Said Saad Stadium
Mabarra	Beirut (Tariq el-Matar)	Mabarra Field
Nejmeh	Beirut (Ras Beirut)	Rafic Hariri Stadium
Racing Beirut	Beirut (Achrafieh)	Sharek Stadium
Riyadi Abbasiyah	Al-Aabbassiyah	Abbas Kazem Nasser Stadium
Safa	Beirut (Wata el-Msaytbeh)	Safa Stadium
Sagesse	Beirut (Achrafieh)	Fouad Chehab Stadium
Shabab Sahel	Beirut (Haret Hreik)	Shabab Al Sahel Stadium
Tadamon Sour	Tyre	Sour Municipal Stadium

=== Personnel and kits ===
Team	Head coach	Captain	Kit manufacturer	Shirt sponsor
Ahed	(Egypt) Ahmed Hafez	(Lebanon) Hussein Dakik	(Spain) Kelme	
Ansar	(Serbia) Dragan Jovanović	(Lebanon) Nazih Assaad	(Spain) Kelme	Green Glory
Bourj	(Lebanon) Ahmad Atwi	(Lebanon) Youssef Anbar	(Spain) Kelme	Royal
Jwaya	(Lebanon) Youssef Al Jawhari	(Lebanon) Hassan Maatouk	(Spain) Kelme	
Mabarra	(Lebanon) Malek Hassoun	(Lebanon) Ahmad Taktouk	(Spain) Kelme	
Nejmeh	(Tunisia) Lassaad Dridi	(Lebanon) Kassem El Zein	(United States) Capelli Sport	Tawfeer
Racing Beirut	(Switzerland) James Hemaid	(Lebanon) Ali Ayoub	(Spain) Joma	
Riyadi Abbasiyah	(Lebanon) Mohammed Zouheir	(Lebanon) Fadel Ajami	(Germany) Jako	La Fabrica
Safa	(Lebanon) Hussein Tahan	(Lebanon) Hussein Sharafeddine	(Spain) Kelme	Tawfeer
Sagesse	(Lebanon) Paul Rustom	(Lebanon) Hatem Eid	(United States) Capelli Sport	OMT Pay
Shabab Sahel	(Lebanon) Said Iskandar	(Lebanon) Ibrahim Mokdad	(Germany) Jako	Xglobal Group
Tadamon Sour	(Lebanon) Khalil Watfa	(Mali) Ichaka Diarra	(Germany) Jako	GCB Exchange

== League table ==
Pos	Team	Pld	W	D	L	GF	GA	GD	Pts	Qualification or relegation (Note: The regular stage was affected by Bourj's withdrawal after 11 matchdays. The remaining 11 clubs played one another twice, while each played Bourj once. The four highest-ranked active clubs then entered a championship group and the three lowest-ranked active clubs entered a relegation group. Each group was played over two rounds, with the four-team championship group producing six matches per team and the three-team relegation group producing four matches per team. Points carried over from the regular stage were halved, with fractions rounded upwards.)
1	Ansar	27	20	5	2	64	16	+48	39	Qualification for the AFC Challenge League group stage
2	Nejmeh	27	17	6	4	50	15	+35	34	Qualification for the AFC Challenge League group stage
3	Jwaya	27	12	7	8	37	22	+15	24	
4	Ahed	27	13	4	10	41	34	+7	23	
5	Safa	21	11	3	7	30	17	+13	36	
6	Sagesse	21	9	3	9	29	27	+2	30	
7	Shabab Sahel	21	7	6	8	22	21	+1	27	
8	Mabarra	21	5	7	9	12	36	−24	22	
9	Riyadi Abbasiyah	25	8	6	11	24	32	−8	20	
10	Tadamon Sour	25	5	9	11	17	29	−12	16	
11	Racing Beirut (R)	25	0	1	24	6	71	−65	1	Relegation to Lebanese Second Division
12	Bourj (Note: Bourj withdrew after matchday 11 due to financial difficulties.) (R)	11	3	1	7	8	20	−12	10	Withdraw

Updated to match(es) played on completed. Source: Global Sports Archive
Rules for classification: 1) Points; 2) Head-to-head points; 3) Head-to-head goal difference; 4) Goal difference; 5) Goals scored; 6) Disciplinary points.
(R) Relegated

== Season statistics ==
=== Goalscorers ===
Rank	Player	Club	Goals
1	(Algeria) Hicham Khalf Allah	Ansar	18
2	(Senegal) Elhadji Malick Tall	Ansar	12
2	(Lebanon) Ali Kassas	Nejmeh	12
4	(Senegal) Sékou Traoré	Sagesse	10
4	(Lebanon) Ali Tneich	Ansar	10
6	(Kenya) Juma Masud	Nejmeh	9
6	(Lebanon) Hassan Maatouk	Jwaya	9
8	(Ghana) Issah Akuka	Riyadi Abbasiyah	6
8	(Senegal) Tidiane Camara	Safa	6
8	(Lebanon) Hassan Salami	Shabab Sahel	6
8	(Lebanon) Fadel Antar	Ahed	6
8	(Lebanon) Mohammad Nasser	Ansar	6

=== Hat-tricks ===
Player	For	Against	Result	Date
(Ghana) Issah Akuka	Riyadi Abbasiyah	Tadamon Sour	3–1	17 October 2025
(Senegal) Elhadji Malick Tall	Ansar	Mabarra	7–0	29 June 2026

== 2026 National Solidarity Tournament ==
2026 National Solidarity Tournament
Tournament details
- Country: Lebanon
- Dates: 12–21 May 2026
- Teams: 6

Final positions
- Champions: Ansar (1st title)
- Runners-up: Nejmeh

Tournament statistics
- Matches played: 7
- Goals scored: 21 (3 per match)
- Top goal scorer(s): Mohamad Bou Saleh; Elhadji Malick Tall (3 goals each)

The 2026 National Solidarity Tournament (Arabic: بطولة التضامن الوطني) was a football tournament organized by the Lebanese Football Association from 12 to 21 May 2026, following the suspension of the 2025–26 Lebanese Premier League due to the 2026 Lebanon war. Contested by the top six clubs in the league at the time of its suspension, the tournament was created to help players regain match fitness and prepare members of the Lebanon national team ahead of the team's Asian Cup qualification match against Yemen in June 2026.

=== Group A ===
Pos	Team	Pld	W	D	L	GF	GA	GD	Pts	Qualification
1	Ansar	2	1	0	1	5	3	+2	3	Qualification for the final
2	Ahed	2	1	0	1	3	3	0	3	
3	Safa	2	1	0	1	3	5	−2	3	

Source: Global Sports Archive
12 May 2026
14:00 UTC+3

Ansar	1–2	Ahed
Bou Saleh 55'	Report	Haidar 27'; Zbib 57'

Fouad Chehab Stadium, Jounieh
Referee: Ahmad Alaeddin
15 May 2026
21:00 UTC+3

Ansar	4–1	Safa
Tall 5', 82'; Matar 32'; Bou Saleh 87'	Report	Shweikh 48'

Fouad Chehab Stadium, Jounieh
Referee: Wael Haidar
18 May 2026
15:00 UTC+3

Ahed	1–2	Safa
Zbib 83'	Report	Dwek 9'; Mehanna 62'

Fouad Chehab Stadium, Jounieh
Referee: Ali Al Ashkar

=== Group B ===
Pos	Team	Pld	W	D	L	GF	GA	GD	Pts	Qualification
1	Nejmeh	2	1	1	0	3	2	+1	4	Qualification for the final
2	Jwaya	2	1	1	0	2	1	+1	4	
3	Sagesse	2	0	0	2	1	3	−2	0	

Source: Global Sports Archive
12 May 2026
21:00 UTC+3

Nejmeh	1–1	Jwaya
Lucumí 59' (pen.)	Report	Badamassi 21'

Fouad Chehab Stadium, Jounieh
Referee: Hussein Abo Yehia
15 May 2026
16:00 UTC+3

Nejmeh	2–1	Sagesse
Kassas 42'; El Fadl 45'	Report	Trad 34'

Fouad Chehab Stadium, Jounieh
Referee: Maher Al Ali
18 May 2026
22:00 UTC+3

Jwaya	1–0	Sagesse
Kanu 59'	Report

Fouad Chehab Stadium, Jounieh
Referee: Ali Chams

=== Final ===
21 May 2026
21:00 UTC+3

Ansar	2–2	Nejmeh
Tall 17'; Bou Saleh 85'	Report	Kassas 40'; Masud 90+2'
Penalties
	14–13

Fouad Chehab Stadium, Jounieh
Referee: Mohamad Issa

== See also ==
- 2025–26 Lebanese FA Cup
