= 2022–23 Lebanese FA Cup =

Tournament details
- Country: Lebanon
- Dates: 16 December 2022 – 30 April 2023
- Teams: 16

Final positions
- Champions: Nejmeh
- Runners-up: Ahed

Tournament statistics
- Matches played: 15
- Goals scored: 35 (2.33 per match)
- Top goal scorer(s): Bobby Clement; Lee Erwin; Ali Haidar Ahmad; Mohammad Nasser (2 goals each)

The 2022–23 Lebanese FA Cup was the 50th edition of the national football cup competition of Lebanon. It started with the round of 16 on 16 December 2022, and ended on 30 April 2023 with the final.

Lebanese Premier League side Nejmeh were the defending champions, having won the 2021–22 edition. They defeated Ahed on penalties in the final to claim their second consecutive title, and eighth overall.

== Teams ==
Round	Dates	Number of fixtures	Clubs remaining	New entries this round	Divisions entering this round
Round of 16	16–18 December 2022	8	16 → 8	16	12 Lebanese Premier League teams 4 Lebanese Second Division teams
Quarter-finals	17 March – 2 April 2023	4	8 → 4	None	none
Semi-finals	23–24 April 2023	2	4 → 2	None	none
Final	30 April 2023	1	2 → 1	None	none

== Round of 16 ==
16 December 2022	Racing Beirut (2)	1–4	Shabab Sahel (1)	Beirut
13:30 UTC+2	Moussawi 71'	Report	Clement 9', 25'; Nettey 34'; Farran 39'	Stadium: Al Safa SC Stadium; Referee: Ali Al Ashkar

17 December 2022	Tadamon Sour (1)	0–2	Nejmeh (1)	Bhamdoun
13:30 UTC+2		Report	Ezzo 70'; Markabawi 90+5'	Stadium: Amin Abdelnour Stadium; Referee: Mohamad Haddad

17 December 2022	Chabab Ghazieh (1)	2–1	Salam Zgharta (1)	Beirut
13:30 UTC+2	Gideou 19'; Abou Zeid 85'	Report	Calamari 22'	Stadium: Al Safa SC Stadium; Referee: Ali Reda

17 December 2022	Islah Borj Shmali (2)	0–2	Bourj (1)	Ansar
13:30 UTC+2		Report	Baffour 39'; Chaito 84'	Stadium: Ansar Stadium; Referee: Maher Al Ali

17 December 2022	Ahed (1)	2–0	Ansar (1)	Jounieh
16:00 UTC+2	Nasser 28'; Kdouh 90+7'	Report		Stadium: Fouad Chehab Stadium; Referee: Hussein Abo Yehia

18 December 2022	Shabab Baalbeck (2)	0–2	Akhaa Ahli Aley (1)	Beirut
13:30 UTC+2		Report	Haidar Ahmad 43'; Saad 67'	Stadium: Al Safa SC Stadium; Referee: Wael Haidar

18 December 2022	Sagesse (1)	0–1	Safa (1)	Jounieh
13:30 UTC+2		Report	Keita 69'	Stadium: Fouad Chehab Stadium; Referee: Mohamad Issa

18 December 2022	Ahli Nabatieh (2)	0–0 (5–4 p)	Tripoli (1)	Beirut
13:30 UTC+2		Report		Stadium: Al Ahed Stadium; Referee: Ali Chamas

== Quarter-finals ==
17 March 2023	Akhaa Ahli Aley (1)	1–2	Bourj (1)	Beirut
12:30 UTC+3	Haidar Ahmad 38'	Report	Skaf 52'; Tetteh 77'	Stadium: Al Ahed Stadium; Referee: Mohamad Haddad

17 March 2023	Shabab Sahel (1)	3–0	Ahli Nabatieh (2)	Beirut
12:30 UTC+3	El Fadl 36'; Haidar 39' (pen.); Khalife 65'	Report		Stadium: Safa Stadium; Referee: Ali Al Ashkar

1 April 2023	Nejmeh (1)	2–1	Safa (1)	Bhamdoun
13:30 UTC+3	Hamam 50'; Kourani 90+4'	Report	Diallo 18'	Stadium: Amin Abdelnour Stadium; Referee: Ali Chamas

2 April 2023	Chabab Ghazieh (1)	0–3	Ahed (1)	Bhamdoun
13:30 UTC+3		Report	Haidar 27' (pen.); Nasser 59'; Erwin 69'	Stadium: Amin Abdelnour Stadium; Referee: Ali Al Ashkar

== Semi-finals ==
23 April 2023	Bourj (1)	0–2	Nejmeh (1)	Jounieh
14:00 UTC+3		Report	El Zein 16'; Barata 33'	Stadium: Fouad Chehab Stadium; Referee: Maher Al Ali

24 April 2023	Shabab Sahel (1)	0–4	Ahed (1)	Jounieh
14:00 UTC+3		Report	Erwin 19'; Melki 29'; Al Haj 85' (pen.); Zein 90+3'	Stadium: Fouad Chehab Stadium; Referee: Hussein Abo Yehia

== Final ==
30 April 2023
14:00 UTC+3

Ahed (1)	0–0	Nejmeh (1)
	Report
Penalties
Haidar (penalty missed); Mansour (penalty scored); Melki (penalty scored); Al Haj (penalty scored); Erwin (penalty missed)	3–4	(penalty scored) Jefinho; (penalty scored) Barata; (penalty scored) Kourani; (penalty scored) Zein

Fouad Chehab Stadium, Jounieh
Referee: Mohamad Issa

== Bracket ==
The following is the bracket which the Lebanese FA Cup resembled. Numbers in parentheses next to the score represents the results of a penalty shoot-out.

Round of 16; 16–18 December 2022
Racing Beirut	1
Shabab Sahel	4
Ahli Nabatieh	0 (5)
Tripoli	0 (4)
Chabab Ghazieh	2
Salam Zgharta	1
Ahed	2
Ansar	0
Shabab Baalbeck	0
Akhaa Ahli Aley	2
Islah Borj Shmali	0
Bourj	2
Tadamon Sour	0
Nejmeh	2
Sagesse	0
Safa	1

Quarter-finals; 17 March – 2 April 2023
Shabab Sahel	3
Ahli Nabatieh	0
Chabab Ghazieh	0
Ahed	3
Akhaa Ahli Aley	1
Bourj	2
Nejmeh	2
Safa	1

Semi-finals; 23–24 April 2023
Shabab Sahel	0
Ahed	4
Bourj	0
Nejmeh	2

Final; 30 April 2023
Ahed	0 (3)
Nejmeh	0 (4)

== Season statistics ==
=== Top scorers ===
Rank	Player	Club	Goals
1	(Nigeria) Bobby Clement	Shabab Sahel	2
1	(Scotland) Lee Erwin	Ahed	2
1	(Lebanon) Ali Haidar Ahmad	Akhaa Ahli Aley	2
1	(Lebanon) Mohammad Nasser	Ahed	2

== See other ==
- 2022–23 Lebanese Premier League
