= Al Ahly SC Nabatieh =

Lebanese football club

Ahly Nabatieh
- Full name: Al Ahly Sporting Club Nabatieh
- Founded: 1968; 58 years ago
- Ground: Kfarjoz Municipal Stadium
- Capacity: 2,000
- Chairman: Vacant
- Manager: Malek Hassoun
- League: Lebanese Second Division
- 2025–26: Lebanese Second Division, 5th of 12
Home colours	Away colours

Al Ahly Sporting Club Nabatieh (Arabic: نادي الأهلي الرياضي النبطية), known as Ahly Nabatieh or simply Nabatieh, is a football club based in Nabatieh, Lebanon. It was established in 1968 and competes in the Lebanese Second Division.

They were first promoted to the Lebanese Premier League in 2023, and finished runners-up in the Lebanese Federation Cup the same year. They however got relegated back to the Second Division at the end of the season.

== History ==
On 3 March 2023, Ahly Nabatieh defeated Sporting 2–1 in the final matchday of the 2022–23 Lebanese Second Division, and were thus promoted to the Lebanese Premier League for the first time. The team also reached the quarter-finals of the 2022–23 Lebanese FA Cup, losing 3–0 to Shabab Sahel.

Ahly Nabatieh finished runners-up in the 2023 Lebanese Federation Cup as a newly promoted Premier League club, after losing to league holders Ahed 4–0 in the final on 27 July 2023. They were relegated back to the Second Division, after finishing the 2023–24 Lebanese Premier League season in 11th place.

== Badge ==
On 2 August 2023, to commemorate Ahly Nabatieh's first season in the Lebanese Premier League and their 55th anniversary, the club unveiled a new logo featuring Hassan Kamel Al-Sabbah, a Nabatieh-born engineer, mathematician and inventor.

== Players ==
=== Current squad ===
As of 13 February 2024

Note: Flags indicate national team as defined under FIFA eligibility rules; some limited exceptions apply. Players may hold more than one non-FIFA nationality.

No.	Pos.	Nation	Player
1	GK	LBN	Afif Zreik
2	DF	LBN	Raed Sabbah
3	DF	LBN	Hussein Fahes
4	DF	LBN	Abdallah Fahes
6	FW	LBN	Ali Ibrahim
7	MF	LBN	Ali Sbeity
8	MF	LBN	Mohammad Ghamlouch
9	FW	LBN	Haidar Awada
10	MF	LBN	Hassan Kadi
11	DF	LBN	Ahmad El Lhaf
13	FW	LBN	Imad Ghaddar
15	FW	GHA	Godfred Yeboah
17	MF	LBN	Hussein Jradi
20	FW	LBN	Mohammad Halawi
21	GK	LBN	Abed Sbeity

No.	Pos.	Nation	Player
22	DF	LBN	Hussein Reda
30	FW	NGA	Ifeanyi Eze
55	MF	LBN	Jawad Reda
66	DF	LBN	Mohammad Nehme
70	DF	LBN	Ali Reda
71	MF	LBN	Hussein Zeineddine
77	FW	LBN	Shadi Jouni
88	DF	LBN	Shadi Al-Hajj
90	MF	LBN	Khaled Sati
99	FW	LBN	Haidar Abou Zeid
—	MF	LBN	Haidar Khreis
—	MF	LBN	Talal Dahrouj
—	GK	LBN	Hassan Nahli
—	MF	TUN	Hamza Zaak
—	FW	SYR	Rafat Mohtadi

== Honours ==
- Lebanese Federation Cup
  - Runners-up (1): 2023

== See also ==
- List of football clubs in Lebanon
