= 2023–24 Lebanese FA Cup =

Tournament details
- Country: Lebanon
- Dates: 20 January – 11 July 2024
- Teams: 16

Final positions
- Champions: Ansar (16th title)
- Runners-up: Ahed

Tournament statistics
- Matches played: 15
- Goals scored: 39 (2.6 per match)
- Top goal scorer(s): Elhadji Malick Tall (4 goals)

The 2023–24 Lebanese FA Cup was the 51st edition of the national football cup competition of Lebanon. It started with the round of 16 on 20 January 2024, and ended on 11 July 2024 with the final.

Lebanese Premier League side Nejmeh were the defending champions, having won the 2022–23 edition. Ansar were crowned champions, after defeating Ahed 2–1 in the final.

== Teams ==
Round	Dates	Number of fixtures	Clubs remaining	New entries this round	Divisions entering this round
Round of 16	20–28 January 2024	8	16 → 8	16	12 Lebanese Premier League teams 4 Lebanese Second Division teams
Quarter-finals	22 March – 28 June 2024	4	8 → 4	none	none
Semi-finals	5 July 2024	2	4 → 2	none	none
Final	11 July 2024	1	2 → 1	none	none

== Round of 16 ==
The round of 16 saw all 12 teams from the 2023–24 Lebanese Premier League participate, as well as the top-4 ranked teams from the first half of the 2023–24 Lebanese Second Division.

Number of teams per tier still in competition
Premier League	Second Division	Total
12 / 12	4 / 12	16 / 24

20 January 2024	Tripoli (1)	4–0	Mabarra (2)	Jounieh
13:30 UTC+2	Al Rachid 33'; Abu Zam'a 45+3'; El Zahed 69'; Al Ali 89'	Report		Stadium: Fouad Chehab Stadium; Referee: Ali Al Ashkar

20 January 2024	Riyadi Abbasiyah (2)	0–4	Bourj (1)	Beirut
13:30 UTC+2		Report	Camara 5'; Kanaan 7' (o.g.); El Saleh 45'; Chmouri 85'	Stadium: Al Ahed Stadium; Referee: Wael Haidar

20 January 2024	Bint Jbeil (2)	2–2 (2–4 p)	Ahly Nabatieh (1)	Ansar
13:30 UTC+2	Abou Zeid 59' (pen.); Jradi 66'	Report	Trad 79'; Jawad 89'	Stadium: Imam Moussa Sader Stadium; Referee: Ali Moubarak
	Penalties
	Nasrallah (penalty missed); Abdalhadi (penalty scored); Jawad (penalty missed); Deeb (penalty scored)		(penalty scored) Eze; (penalty scored) El Sati; (penalty scored) Ghamlouch; (penalty scored) Reda

21 January 2024	Shabab Baalbeck (2)	3–2	Chabab Ghazieh (1)	Bhamdoun
13:30 UTC+2	Tlays 34'; Cisse 37'; Ghanem 62'	Report	Hamdan 20'; Nawatta 59'	Stadium: Amin Abdelnour Stadium; Referee: Kazem El Khansa

26 January 2024	Safa (1)	0–0 (4–2 p)	Racing Beirut (1)	Jounieh
13:30 UTC+2		Report		Stadium: Fouad Chehab Stadium; Referee: Maher Al Ali
	Penalties
	Kdouh (penalty scored); Shweikh (penalty scored); Nasser (penalty scored); Chaitou (penalty scored)		(penalty missed) Arsić; (penalty missed) Mokombo; (penalty scored) Noureddine; (penalty scored) Mohendiki

28 January 2024	Ansar (1)	3–1	Shabab Sahel (1)	Jounieh
13:30 UTC+2	Matar 16'; Tall 28', 79'; Ghanem 62'	Report	Fakih 49'	Stadium: Fouad Chehab Stadium; Referee: Ali Reda

28 January 2024	Tadamon Sour (1)	0–1	Nejmeh (1)	Bhamdoun
13:30 UTC+2		Report	Arab 45+1' (o.g.)	Stadium: Amin Abdelnour Stadium; Referee: Ahmad Alaeddin

28 January 2024	Ahed (1)	3–1	Sagesse (1)	Beirut
13:30 UTC+2	Zein 23'; Shour 25' (pen.); Darwich 34'	Report	Sarr 5'	Stadium: Safa Stadium; Referee: Hussein Abo Yehia

== Quarter-finals ==
Number of teams per tier still in competition
Premier League	Second Division	Total
7 / 12	1 / 12	8 / 24

22 March 2024	Shabab Baalbeck (2)	0–3	Bourj (1)	Baalbek
14:30 UTC+2		Report	Camara 35', 47'; Shour 25' (pen.); El Dor 90+1'	Stadium: Baalbek Municipal Stadium; Referee: Ahmad Damaj

20 April 2024	Ahly Nabatieh (1)	0–1	Tripoli (1)	Beirut
16:00 UTC+3		Report	Dakramanji 54'	Stadium: Al Ahed Stadium; Referee: Ahmad Alaeddin

21 April 2024	Ansar (1)	2–0	Nejmeh (1)	Tripoli
16:00 UTC+3	Tall 59' (pen.), 79'	Report		Stadium: Ihtiyat Tripoli Stadium; Referee: Mohamad Issa

28 June 2024	Ahed (1)	2–1	Safa (1)	Bhamdoun
17:00 UTC+3	Darwich 32' (pen.), 41'	Report	Takaji 83'	Stadium: Amin Abdelnour Stadium; Referee: Hadi Salame

== Semi-finals ==
Number of teams per tier still in competition
Premier League	Second Division	Total
4 / 12	0 / 12	4 / 24

5 July 2024	Ansar (1)	1–0	Bourj (1)	Bhamdoun
17:00 UTC+2		Report		Stadium: Amin Abdelnour Stadium

Ahed (1)	w/o	Tripoli (1)

== Final ==
11 July 2024
17:00 UTC+3

Ansar (1)	2–1	Ahed (1)
Houssam Eddine 20'; Al Haj 49'	Report	Farran 15'

Fouad Chehab Stadium, Jounieh

== Bracket ==
The following is the bracket which the Lebanese FA Cup resembled. Numbers in parentheses next to the score represents the results of a penalty shoot-out.

Round of 16; 20–28 January 2024
Ansar	3
Shabab Sahel	1
Tadamon Sour	0
Nejmeh	1
Shabab Baalbeck	3
Chabab Ghazieh	2
Riyadi Abbasiyah	0
Bourj	4
Bint Jbeil	2 (2)
Ahly Nabatieh	2 (4)
Tripoli	4
Mabarra	0
Safa	0 (4)
Racing Beirut	0 (2)
Ahed	3
Sagesse	1

Quarter-finals; 22 March – 28 June 2024
Ansar	2
Nejmeh	0
Shabab Baalbeck	0
Bourj	3
Ahly Nabatieh	0
Tripoli	1
Safa	1
Ahed	2

Semi-finals; 5 July 2024
Ansar	1
Bourj	0
Ahed	w/o
Tripoli

Final; 11 July 2024
Ansar	2
Ahed	1

== Season statistics ==
=== Top scorers ===
Rank	Player	Club	Goals
1	(Senegal) Elhadji Malick Tall	Ansar	4
2	(Lebanon) Karim Darwich	Ahed	3
2	(Senegal) Tidiane Camara	Bourj	3

== See other ==
- 2023–24 Lebanese Premier League
