= Lebanese Federation Cup =

Lebanese association football tournament

- Organising body: Lebanese Football Association (LFA)
- Founded: 1969; 56 years ago
- Region: Lebanon
- Number of teams: 12
- Current champions: Ahed (2nd title)
- Most successful club(s): Ahed; Ansar (2 titles each)
- Television broadcasters: LFA (YouTube)
- 2023 Lebanese Federation Cup

The Lebanese Federation Cup (Arabic: كأس الإتحاد اللبناني) is an annual cup competition in men's domestic football in Lebanon. Organised by the Lebanese Football Association (LFA), it serves as the domestic league cup to the Lebanese Premier League and is contested before the start of each league season.

The cup was first held in 1969, with Shabiba Mazraa winning its first edition. After having been played in 1972, the Lebanese Federation Cup was halted for 27 years, before being contested in 1999. It was played twice more, in 2000 and 2004, before being halted once again until 2023. In 2023, the Lebanese Federation Cup replaced the Lebanese Elite Cup and Lebanese Challenge Cup as the pre-season preparatory tournament.

The tournament is played over two rounds: the first round is a single round-robin, in which 12 teams are divided into four groups of three. Four teams qualify for the second round, a knockout tournament with two semi-finals and a final.

== Format ==
The Lebanese Federation Cup, held as a preparatory tournament prior to the start of the Lebanese Premier League season, includes participation from all 12 teams of the league. It begins with a group stage consisting of four groups, each comprising three teams, with the top four clubs from the previous league season assigned as the seeded teams. This phase operates in a single round-robin format. Following this, the top-ranked team from each group advances to the semi-finals, with the winners of the two semi-final matches progressing to the final.

During the group stage, teams are ranked based on their total points, followed by head-to-head results and then head-to-head goal difference. If teams are still level, further criteria – namely overall goal difference, goals scored, disciplinary points, and eventually a coin-flip – are utilized to determine rankings. In the knockout stages, if a tie persists after 90 minutes, a penalty shoot-out is conducted to determine the winner.

== Winners and finalists ==
=== Winners by year ===
Lebanese Federation Cup finals
No.	Season	Winners	Score	Runners–up
1st	1969	Shabiba Mazraa		
2nd	1972	Riada Wal Adab		
3rd	1999	Ansar	4–0	Salam Zgharta
4th	2000	Ansar	1–0 (aet)	Tadamon Sour
5th	2004	Ahed	3–2 (aet)	Sagesse
6th	2023	Ahed	4–0	Ahli Nabatieh

=== Results by team ===
Club	Wins	Runners-up	Total final appearances
Ansar	2	0	2
Ahed	2	0	2
Shabiba Mazraa	1	0	1
Riada Wal Adab	1	0	1
Salam Zgharta	0	1	1
Tadamon Sour	0	1	1
Sagesse	0	1	1
Ahli Nabatieh	0	1	1

== See also ==
- Lebanese Super Cup
