= Lebanese Super Cup =

- Organizer(s): Lebanese Football Association
- Founded: 1996; 30 years ago
- Region: Lebanon
- Teams: 2
- Current champion: Nejmeh (8th title)
- Most championships: Ahed, Nejmeh (8 titles)
- Broadcaster: FIFA+
- 2024 Lebanese Super Cup

The Lebanese Super Cup (Arabic: كأس السوبر اللبناني) is Lebanese football's annual match contested between the champions of the previous Lebanese Premier League season and the holders of the Lebanese FA Cup. If the Lebanese Premier League champions also won the Lebanese FA Cup then the league runners-up provide the opposition.

The fixture is recognized as a competitive super cup by the Lebanese Football Association and the Asian Football Confederation. Ahed and Nejmeh are the most successful clubs in the competition with eight wins each.

== Winners and finalists ==
=== Winners by year ===
Lebanese Super Cup finals
No.	Season	Winners	Score	Runners–up
1st	1996	Ansar	2–0	Nejmeh
2nd	1997	Ansar	1–0	Nejmeh
3rd	1998	Ansar	4–2	Homenmen
4th	1999	Ansar	2–2 (p)	Homenmen
5th	2000	Nejmeh	2–0	Shabab Sahel
6th	2002	Nejmeh	3–3 (p)	Ansar
7th	2004	Nejmeh	2–0	Ahed
8th	2005	Ahed	2–1	Nejmeh
9th	2008	Ahed	3–1	Mabarra
10th	2009	Nejmeh	0–0 (p)	Ahed
11th	2010	Ahed	1–0	Ansar
12th	2011	Ahed	3–1	Safa
13th	2012	Ansar	1–0	Safa
14th	2013	Safa	1–0	Shabab Sahel
15th	2014	Nejmeh	4–1	Salam Zgharta
16th	2015	Ahed	1–0	Tripoli
17th	2016	Nejmeh	2–0	Safa
18th	2017	Ahed	2–0	Ansar
19th	2018	Ahed	1–0	Nejmeh
20th	2019	Ahed	2–1	Ansar
21st	2021	Ansar	2–2 (p)	Nejmeh
22nd	2023	Nejmeh	0–0 (p)	Ahed
23rd	2024	Nejmeh	3–1	Ansar

=== Results by team ===
Club	Wins	Runners-up	Total final appearances
Nejmeh	8	5	13
Ahed	8	3	11
Ansar	6	5	11
Safa	1	3	4
Homenmen	0	2	2
Shabab Sahel	0	2	2
Mabarra	0	1	1
Salam Zgharta	0	1	1
Tripoli	0	1	1

== Media coverage ==
In October 2022, the LFA and FIFA signed an agreement to broadcast all matches in the Lebanese Super Cup, Lebanese Second Division and Lebanese Women's Football League, and some Lebanese Premier League games, through the FIFA+ platform.

== See also ==
- Lebanese Federation Cup
- Lebanese Elite Cup
- Lebanese Challenge Cup
