= 2020–21 in Lebanese football =

Football in Lebanon
- Season: 2020–21

Men's football
- Premier League: Ansar
- Second Division: AC Sporting
- Third Division: Sporting Qlaileh
- FA Cup: Ansar

Women's football
- Football League: Safa
- FA Cup: EFP

The 2020–21 season was the 88th season of competitive football in Lebanon. The season officially began on 3 October 2020 with the Lebanese Premier League.

== National teams ==
=== Lebanon national football team ===
==== Kits ====
Home	Away

==== Results and fixtures ====
===== Friendlies =====
12 November 2021 Friendly	Bahrain	3–1	Lebanon	Dubai, United Arab Emirates
18:00 UTC+4	Isa 53'; Al Aswad 58'; Marhoon 82'	Report	Kdouh 44'	Stadium: Police Officers' Club Stadium; Attendance: 0 (Note: Match played behind closed doors due to the COVID-19 pandemic); Referee: Ahmed Al Ali (Kuwait)

24 March 2021 Friendly	Jordan	1–0	Lebanon	Dubai, United Arab Emirates
14:45 UTC+4	Al-Taamari 50'	Report		Stadium: Theyab Awana Stadium; Attendance: 0 Referee: Mohammed Abdulla Hassan Mohamed (United Arab Emirates)

29 March 2021 Friendly	Kuwait	1–1	Lebanon	Dubai, United Arab Emirates
15:45 UTC+4	Al-Khaldi 15'	Report	Kdouh 60'	Stadium: Police Officers' Club Stadium; Attendance: 0 Referee: Ammar Ali Al Jneibi (United Arab Emirates)

===== 2022 FIFA World Cup qualification =====
====== Second round: Group H ======
Pos	Team	Pld	W	D	L	GF	GA	GD	Pts	Qualification	South Korea	Lebanon	Turkmenistan	Sri Lanka	North Korea
1	South Korea	6	5	1	0	22	1	+21	16	World Cup qualifying third round and Asian Cup	—	2–1	5–0	8–0	~~Canc.~~
2	Lebanon	6	3	1	2	11	8	+3	10	World Cup qualifying third round and Asian Cup	0–0	—	2–1	3–2	~~0–0~~
3	Turkmenistan	6	3	0	3	8	11	−3	9	Asian Cup qualifying third round	0–2	3–2	—	2–0	~~3–1~~
4	Sri Lanka	6	0	0	6	2	23	−21	0	Asian Cup qualifying third round	0–5	0–3	0–2	—	~~0–1~~
5	North Korea (Note: North Korea withdrew due to safety concerns related to the COVID-19 pandemic, therefore the results of their matches were excluded from the group standings.)	0	0	0	0	0	0	0	0	Withdrew	~~0–0~~	~~2–0~~	~~Canc.~~	~~Canc.~~	—

Source: FIFA
Rules for classification: Qualification tiebreakers
Notes:

5 June 2021 2022 World Cup qualification R2	Lebanon	3–2	Sri Lanka	Goyang, South Korea
15:00 UTC+9	Oumari 11', 44'; Kdouh 17'	Report	Razeek 10', 61' (pen.)	Stadium: Goyang Stadium; Attendance: 0 Referee: Ahmad Ibrahim (Jordan)

9 June 2021 2022 World Cup qualification R2	Turkmenistan	3–2	Lebanon	Goyang, South Korea
15:00 UTC+9	Babajanow 59'; Annagulyýew 85'; Annadurdyýew 90+2'	Report	Ataya 73'; Saad 75'	Stadium: Goyang Stadium; Attendance: 0 Referee: Hanna Hattab (Syria)

13 June 2021 2022 World Cup qualification R2	South Korea	2–1	Lebanon	Goyang, South Korea
15:00 UTC+9	Song Min-kyu 50'; Son Heung-min 65' (pen.)	Report	Saad 12'	Stadium: Goyang Stadium; Attendance: 4,061; Referee: Khamis Al-Marri (Qatar)

===== 2021 FIFA Arab Cup =====
====== Qualification ======
23 June 2021 2021 FIFA Arab Cup qualification	Lebanon	1–0	Djibouti	Doha, Qatar
20:00 UTC+3	El-Helwe 46'	Report		Stadium: Khalifa International Stadium; Referee: Benoît Bastien (France)

=== Lebanon women's national football team ===
==== Results and fixtures ====
===== Armenia Friendly Tournament =====
8 April 2021 2021 Armenia Friendly Tournament	Armenia	2–0	Lebanon	Yerevan, Armenia
	Haddad 7' (o.g.); Artin 45'	Report		Stadium: Pyunik Training Centre

10 April 2021 2021 Armenia Friendly Tournament	Lithuania	7–1	Lebanon	Yerevan, Armenia
	Jonušaitė 5', 16', 43'; Vaitukaitytė 12' (pen.), 31'; Lazdauskaitė 34'; Ruzgutė 57'	Report	El Tayar 32'	Stadium: Pyunik Training Centre

12 April 2021 2021 Armenia Friendly Tournament	Lebanon	0–6	Jordan	Charentsavan, Armenia
		Report	Jbarah 17', 61'; Fraij 20', 48'; Al-Masri 38'; Al-Btoush 72'	Stadium: Charentsavan City Stadium

== Men's football ==
=== AFC Cup ===
==== Group stage ====
===== Group A =====
Pos	Team	Pld	W	D	L	GF	GA	GD	Pts	Qualification	AHE	WAH	HID
1	(Lebanon) Al-Ahed	2	1	1	0	2	1	+1	4	Zonal semi-finals	—	—	2–1
2	(Syria) Al-Wahda	2	0	2	0	1	1	0	2		0–0	—	—
3	(Bahrain) Al-Hidd (H)	2	0	1	1	2	3	−1	1		—	1–1	—

Source: AFC
(H) Hosts

===== Group B =====
Pos	Team	Pld	W	D	L	GF	GA	GD	Pts	Qualification	MUH	SAL	ANS	MBA
1	(Bahrain) Al-Muharraq	3	2	0	1	6	4	+2	6 (Note: Head-to-head points: Al-Muharraq 3, Al-Salt 0.)	Zonal semi-finals	—	—	—	2–3
2	(Jordan) Al-Salt (H)	3	2	0	1	7	2	+5	6	Zonal semi-finals	0–1	—	—	5–0
3	(Lebanon) Al-Ansar	3	1	0	2	4	5	−1	3 (Note: Head-to-head points: Al-Ansar 3, Markaz Balata 0.)		1–3	1–2	—	—
4	(Palestine) Markaz Balata	3	1	0	2	3	9	−6	3		—	—	0–2	—

Source: AFC
(H) Hosts

=== Lebanese Premier League ===
Pos	Team	Pld	W	D	L	GF	GA	GD	Pts	Qualification or relegation (Note: Teams played each other once (11 matches), before the league was split into two groups (the top six and the bottom six) where they played each team in their group once (5 matches).)
1	Ansar (C)	16	13	1	2	37	8	+29	40	Qualification for AFC Cup group stage
2	Nejmeh	16	10	5	1	31	10	+21	35	Qualification for AFC Cup group stage
3	Shabab Sahel	16	8	3	5	15	11	+4	27	
4	Ahed	16	6	6	4	20	16	+4	24 (Note: Head-to-head results: Ahed 2–1 Safa, Safa 3–3 Ahed.)	
5	Safa	16	7	3	6	25	25	0	24	
6	Akhaa Ahli Aley	16	5	5	6	8	12	−4	20	
7	Bourj	16	5	8	3	18	13	+5	23 (Note: Head-to-head results: Shabab Bourj 0–1 Bourj, Bourj 1–1 Shabab Bourj.)	
8	Shabab Bourj	16	6	5	5	22	14	+8	23	
9	Tripoli	16	5	4	7	11	15	−4	19	
10	Tadamon Sour	16	3	7	6	7	12	−5	16	
11	Chabab Ghazieh (R)	16	3	2	11	12	26	−14	11	Relegation to Lebanese Second Division
12	Salam Zgharta (R)	16	0	1	15	6	50	−44	1	Relegation to Lebanese Second Division

Source: FA Lebanon
Rules for classification: 1) Points; 2) Head-to-head points; 3) Head-to-head goal difference; 4) Goal difference; 5) Goals scored; 6) Draw.
(C) Champions; (R) Relegated

=== Lebanese Second Division ===
Pos	Team	Pld	W	D	L	GF	GA	GD	Pts	Promotion or relegation (Note: Teams play each other once (11 matches), before the league is split into two groups (the top six and the bottom six).)
1	Sporting (C, P)	16	10	5	1	38	12	+26	35	Promotion to Lebanese Premier League
2	Sagesse (P)	16	9	5	2	24	10	+14	32	Promotion to Lebanese Premier League
3	Ahli Nabatieh	16	9	2	5	25	14	+11	29	
4	Islah Borj Shmali	16	7	4	5	28	18	+10	25	
5	Ahli Saida	16	7	4	5	28	24	+4	25	
6	Nahda Barelias	16	4	7	5	14	20	−6	19	
7	Racing Beirut	16	8	5	3	29	19	+10	29	
8	Egtmaaey	16	5	4	7	20	33	−13	19	
9	Nabi Chit	16	5	3	8	26	30	−4	18	
10	Mabarra	16	4	4	8	19	24	−5	16	
11	Nasser Bar Elias (R)	16	2	5	9	17	31	−14	11	Relegation to Lebanese Third Division
12	Ansar Howara (R)	16	1	2	13	21	54	−33	5	Relegation to Lebanese Third Division

Source: Goalzz
Rules for classification: 1) Points; 2) Head-to-head points; 3) Head-to-head goal difference; 4) Goal difference; 5) Goals scored; 6) Draw.
(C) Champions; (P) Promoted; (R) Relegated

=== Lebanese Third Division ===
==== Group A ====
Pos	Team	Pld	W	D	L	GF	GA	GD	Pts	Promotion or relegation
1	Shabab Majdal Anjar	12	7	2	3	25	5	+20	23	Qualification for promotion play-offs
2	Ittihad Haret Naameh	12	7	2	3	17	7	+10	23	
3	Homenmen	12	6	2	4	25	22	+3	20	
4	Wahda Marj	12	4	3	5	18	17	+1	15	
5	Zamalek Beirut	12	4	3	5	17	24	−7	15	
6	Nojoom Beirut (R)	12	4	0	8	16	28	−12	12	Relegation to Lebanese Fourth Division
7	Homenetmen (R)	12	4	0	8	9	24	−15	12	Relegation to Lebanese Fourth Division

Source: Goalzz
Rules for classification: 1) Points; 2) Head-to-head points; 3) Head-to-head goal difference; 4) Goal difference; 5) Goals scored; 6) Draw.
(R) Relegated

==== Group B ====
Pos	Team	Pld	W	D	L	GF	GA	GD	Pts	Promotion or relegation
1	Irshad Chehim	12	9	2	1	38	13	+25	29	Qualification for promotion play-offs
2	Salam Sour	12	6	3	3	25	15	+10	21	
3	Raya	12	6	2	4	17	16	+1	20	
4	Taqadom Anqoun	12	4	3	5	20	16	+4	15	
5	Hilal Haret Naameh	12	4	3	5	19	27	−8	15	
6	Ahli Sarba (R)	12	4	3	5	21	19	+2	15	Relegation to Lebanese Fourth Division
7	Sharq (R)	12	1	0	11	8	42	−34	3	Relegation to Lebanese Fourth Division

Source: Goalzz
Rules for classification: 1) Points; 2) Head-to-head points; 3) Head-to-head goal difference; 4) Goal difference; 5) Goals scored; 6) Draw.
(R) Relegated

==== Group C ====
Pos	Team	Pld	W	D	L	GF	GA	GD	Pts	Promotion or relegation
1	Sporting Qlaileh	12	8	2	2	24	7	+17	26	Qualification for promotion play-offs
2	Riyadi Abbasiya	12	7	2	3	22	15	+7	23	
3	Nahda Ain Baal	12	5	2	5	27	24	+3	17	
4	Harouf	12	5	2	5	17	20	−3	17	
5	Bint Jbeil	12	4	3	5	17	21	−4	15	
6	Okhwa Kharayeb (R)	12	4	1	7	13	16	−3	13	Relegation to Lebanese Fourth Division
7	Amal Maaraka (R)	12	3	0	9	13	30	−17	9	Relegation to Lebanese Fourth Division

Source: Goalzz
Rules for classification: 1) Points; 2) Head-to-head points; 3) Head-to-head goal difference; 4) Goal difference; 5) Goals scored; 6) Draw.
(R) Relegated

==== Group D ====
Pos	Team	Pld	W	D	L	GF	GA	GD	Pts	Promotion or relegation
1	Ansar Mawadda	12	10	1	1	27	6	+21	31	Qualification for promotion play-offs
2	Shabab Tripoli	12	9	0	3	26	10	+16	27	
3	Riada Wal Adab	12	5	2	5	18	16	+2	17	
4	Achbal Mina'a	12	4	4	4	17	16	+1	16	
5	Mahabbe Tripoli	12	4	3	5	17	16	+1	15	
6	Majd Tripoli (R)	12	3	1	8	20	38	−18	10	Relegation to Lebanese Fourth Division
7	Amal Salam Zgharta (R)	12	1	1	10	13	36	−23	4	Relegation to Lebanese Fourth Division

Source: Goalzz
Rules for classification: 1) Points; 2) Head-to-head points; 3) Head-to-head goal difference; 4) Goal difference; 5) Goals scored; 6) Draw.
(R) Relegated

==== Promotion play-offs ====
Pos	Team	Pld	W	D	L	GF	GA	GD	Pts	Promotion or relegation
1	Sporting Qlaileh	3	2	1	0	6	2	+4	7	Promotion to Lebanese Second Division
2	Shabab Majdal Anjar	3	1	1	1	3	3	0	4	Promotion to Lebanese Second Division
3	Ansar Mawadda	3	0	2	1	5	6	−1	2	
4	Irshad Chehim	3	0	2	1	3	6	−3	2	

Source: Goalzz
Rules for classification: 1) Points; 2) Head-to-head points; 3) Head-to-head goal difference; 4) Goal difference; 5) Goals scored; 6) Draw.

=== Cup competitions ===
==== Lebanese FA Cup ====
===== Final =====
12 May 2021
15:40 UTC+3

Ansar (1)	1–1	Nejmeh (1)
Matar 23'	Report	Hamam 84'
Penalties
Maatouk (penalty scored); Ayoub (penalty scored); Nassar (penalty scored)	3–1	(penalty missed) Atwi; (penalty missed) Chehade; (penalty scored) Kourani; (penalty missed) Alaaeddine

Fouad Chehab Stadium, Jounieh
Attendance: 0
Referee: Mohamad Issa

==== Lebanese Elite and Challenge Cup ====
The 2020 Lebanese Elite and Challenge Cup was intended to be the first, and only, edition of the tournament. Due to the 2019–20 Lebanese Premier League being canceled, the tournament was supposed to feature a joint-qualifying tournament for the Lebanese Elite Cup and Lebanese Challenge Cup between the 12 Lebanese Premier League teams, to decide which six teams would have played in the Elite Cup, and which six in the Challenge Cup. The 12 Lebanese Premier League teams were divided in three groups of four: the top two teams of each group would qualify to the Elite Cup, whereas the bottom two would qualify to the Challenge Cup.

The Lebanese Elite and Challenge Cup was supposed to kick off on 22 August 2020 with the preparatory tournament. Initially scheduled to begin on 29 July, the tournament was first postponed to 1 August, then to 10 August in order to raise preventive measures towards the COVID-19 pandemic. The starting date was finally postponed to 22 August following the 2020 Beirut explosions. On 19 August, the Lebanese Football Association (LFA) cancelled the tournament altogether as part of preventive measures to combat the COVID-19 outbreak.

== Women's football ==
=== Lebanese Women's Football League ===
==== Group A ====
Pos	Team	Pld	W	D	L	GF	GA	GD	Pts	Qualification
1	EFP	4	3	1	0	27	4	+23	10	Qualification to the final six
2	Safa	4	3	0	1	28	3	+25	9	Qualification to the final six
3	BFA	4	2	1	1	18	7	+11	7	Qualification to the final six
4	United Tripoli	4	1	0	3	5	34	−29	3	
5	Montada North Lebanon	4	0	0	4	4	34	−30	0	

Source: Global Sports Archive
Rules for classification: 1) Points; 2) Goal difference; 3) Number of goals scored

==== Group B ====
Pos	Team	Pld	W	D	L	GF	GA	GD	Pts	Qualification
1	SAS	5	5	0	0	47	0	+47	15	Qualification to the final six
2	Super Girls	5	4	0	1	28	10	+18	12	Qualification to the final six
3	ÓBerytus	5	3	0	2	16	11	+5	9	Qualification to the final six
4	Sakafi Chhim	5	2	0	3	14	25	−11	6	
5	Taadod Mazraat Chouf	5	1	0	4	4	19	−15	3	
6	Primo	5	0	0	5	5	49	−44	0	

Source: Global Sports Archive
Rules for classification: 1) Points; 2) Goal difference; 3) Number of goals scored

==== Final six ====
Pos	Team	Pld	W	D	L	GF	GA	GD	Pts	Qualification
1	Safa (C)	5	4	1	0	17	2	+15	13	Qualification for WAFF Clubs Championship
2	EFP	5	3	1	1	12	3	+9	10	
3	SAS	5	2	3	0	7	5	+2	9	
4	BFA	5	2	1	2	7	12	−5	7	
5	ÓBerytus	5	1	0	4	4	13	−9	3	
6	Super Girls	5	0	0	5	1	13	−12	0	

Source: Global Sports Archive
Rules for classification: 1) Points; 2) Goal difference; 3) Number of goals scored
(C) Champions
