= 2021–22 in Lebanese football =

Football in Lebanon
- Season: 2021–22

Men's football
- Premier League: Ahed
- Second Division: Chabab Ghazieh
- Third Division: Riyadi Abbasiya
- FA Cup: Nejmeh
- Elite Cup: Nejmeh
- Challenge Cup: Bourj
- Super Cup: Ansar

Women's football
- Football League: SAS
- Super Cup: Safa

The 2021–22 season was the 89th season of competitive football in Lebanon. The season officially began on 12 July 2021 with the Lebanese Elite Cup.

== National teams ==
=== Lebanon national football team ===
==== 2022 FIFA World Cup qualification ====
===== Third round: Group A =====
Pos	Team	Pld	W	D	L	GF	GA	GD	Pts	Qualification	Iran	South Korea	United Arab Emirates	Iraq	United Arab Republic	Lebanon
1	Iran	10	8	1	1	15	4	+11	25	2022 FIFA World Cup	—	1–1	1–0	1–0	1–0	2–0
2	South Korea	10	7	2	1	13	3	+10	23	2022 FIFA World Cup	2–0	—	1–0	0–0	2–1	1–0
3	United Arab Emirates	10	3	3	4	7	7	0	12	Fourth round	0–1	1–0	—	2–2	2–0	0–0
4	Iraq	10	1	6	3	6	12	−6	9		0–3	0–3	1–0	—	1–1	0–0
5	Syria	10	1	3	6	9	16	−7	6		0–3	0–2	1–1	1–1	—	2–3
6	Lebanon	10	1	3	6	5	13	−8	6		1–2	0–1	0–1	1–1	0–3	—

Source: FIFA, AFC
Rules for classification: Tiebreakers

2 September 2021 2022 World Cup qualification R3	United Arab Emirates	0–0	Lebanon	Dubai, United Arab Emirates
20:45 UTC+4		Report		Stadium: Zabeel Stadium; Referee: Ma Ning (China PR)

7 September 2021 2022 World Cup qualification R3	South Korea	1–0	Lebanon	Suwon, South Korea
20:00 UTC+9	Kwon Chang-hoon 59'	Report		Stadium: Suwon World Cup Stadium; Attendance: 0 Referee: Ryuji Sato (Japan)

7 October 2021 2022 World Cup qualification R3	Iraq	0–0	Lebanon	Doha, Qatar
17:30 UTC+3		Report		Stadium: Khalifa International Stadium; Attendance: 0 Referee: Turki Al-Khudhayr (Saudi Arabia)

12 October 2021 2022 World Cup qualification R3	Syria	2–3	Lebanon	Amman, Jordan
19:00 UTC+3	Khribin 20'; Al Somah 65'	Report	Kdouh 45+1', 45+3'; Saad 53'	Stadium: King Abdullah II Stadium; Referee: Chris Beath (Australia)

11 November 2021 2022 World Cup qualification R3	Lebanon	1–2	Iran	Sidon, Lebanon
14:00 UTC+2	Saad 37'	Report	Azmoun 90+1'; Nourollahi 90+5'	Stadium: Saida Municipal Stadium; Attendance: 0 Referee: Abdulrahman Al-Jassim (Qatar)

16 November 2021 2022 World Cup qualification R3	Lebanon	0–1	United Arab Emirates	Sidon, Lebanon
14:00 UTC+2		Report	Mabkhout 85' (pen.)	Stadium: Saida Municipal Stadium; Attendance: 0 Referee: Shaun Evans (Australia)

27 January 2022 2022 World Cup qualification R3	Lebanon	0–1	South Korea	Sidon, Lebanon
14:00 UTC+2		Report	Cho Gue-sung 45+1'	Stadium: Saida Municipal Stadium; Referee: Ahmed Al-Kaf (Oman)

1 February 2022 2022 World Cup qualification R3	Lebanon	1–1	Iraq	Sidon, Lebanon
14:00 UTC+2	Sabra 45+2'	Report	Hussein 39'	Stadium: Saida Municipal Stadium; Attendance: 6,341; Referee: Adham Makhadmeh (Jordan)

24 March 2022 2022 World Cup qualification R3	Lebanon	0–3	Syria	Sidon, Lebanon
14:00 UTC+2		Report	Al Dali 14'; Mardikian 38' (pen.); Al Marmour 44'	Stadium: Saida Municipal Stadium; Attendance: 5,422; Referee: Abdulrahman Al-Jassim (Qatar)

29 March 2022 2022 World Cup qualification R3	Iran	2–0	Lebanon	Mashhad, Iran
16:00 UTC+4:30	Azmoun 35'; Jahanbakhsh 62'	Report		Stadium: Imam Reza Stadium; Attendance: 22,453; Referee: Fu Ming (China)

==== FIFA Arab Cup ====
===== Group D =====
Pos	Team	Pld	W	D	L	GF	GA	GD	Pts	Qualification
1	Egypt	3	2	1	0	7	1	+6	7 (Note: Fair-play points: Egypt –6, Algeria –11.)	Advance to knockout stage
2	Algeria	3	2	1	0	7	1	+6	7	Advance to knockout stage
3	Lebanon	3	1	0	2	1	3	−2	3	
4	Sudan	3	0	0	3	0	10	−10	0	

Source: FIFA
Notes:

1 December 2021 2021 FIFA Arab Cup GS	Egypt	1–0	Lebanon	Doha, Qatar
16:00 UTC+3	Magdy 71' (pen.)	Report		Stadium: Al Thumama Stadium; Referee: Daniel Siebert (Germany)

4 December 2021 2021 FIFA Arab Cup GS	Lebanon	0–2	Algeria	Al Wakrah, Qatar
16:00 UTC+3		Report	Brahimi 69' (pen.); Meziani 90+3'	Stadium: Al Janoub Stadium; Referee: Szymon Marciniak (Poland)

7 December 2021 2021 FIFA Arab Cup GS	Lebanon	1–0	Sudan	Al Rayyan, Qatar
22:00 UTC+3	Abu Eshrein 76' (o.g.)	Report		Stadium: Education City Stadium; Referee: Fernando Hernández Gómez (Mexico)

=== Lebanon women's national football team ===
==== 2021 Arab Women's Cup ====
===== Group A =====
Pos	Team	Pld	W	D	L	GF	GA	GD	Pts	Qualification
1	Egypt (H)	3	2	1	0	16	2	+14	7	Advance to knockout stage
2	Tunisia	3	1	2	0	14	3	+11	5	Advance to knockout stage
3	Lebanon	3	1	1	1	5	5	0	4	
4	Sudan	3	0	0	3	2	27	−25	0	

Source: Goalzz.com
(H) Hosts

24 August 2021 2021 Arab Cup GS	Tunisia	0–0	Lebanon	Cairo, Egypt
21:00 UTC+2		Report		Stadium: Police Academy Stadium; Referee: Bouchra Karboubi (Morocco)

27 August 2021 2021 Arab Cup GS	Lebanon	0–4	Egypt	Cairo, Egypt
21:00 UTC+2		Report	Elmitwalli; Nadda; Abu Al Joud; Ghazi	Stadium: Police Academy Stadium; Referee: Lamia Athman (Algeria)

30 August 2021 2021 Arab Cup GS	Lebanon	5–1	Sudan	Cairo, Egypt
21:00 UTC+2	Al Kasti 3', 19'; Maalouf 6'; Salha 26', 44'	Report	Ragab 50'	Stadium: Osman Ahmed Osman Stadium

==== 2022 AFC Women's Asian Cup qualification ====
===== Group D =====
Pos	Team	Pld	W	D	L	GF	GA	GD	Pts	Qualification
1	Myanmar	3	3	0	0	14	0	+14	9	Final tournament
2	Lebanon	3	2	0	1	4	4	0	6	
3	United Arab Emirates	3	1	0	2	2	4	−2	3	
4	Guam	3	0	0	3	1	13	−12	0	

Source: AFC
Rules for classification: Qualification tiebreakers

18 October 2021 2022 Asian Cup qualification	Myanmar	4–0	Lebanon	Bishkek, Kyrgyzstan
12:00 UTC+6	Win Theingi Tun 24' (pen.); Myat Noe Khin 64'; San Thaw Thaw 86'; July Kyaw 90+3'	Report		Stadium: Dolen Omurzakov Stadium; Referee: Wang Chieh (Chinese Taipei)

21 October 2021 2022 Asian Cup qualification	Lebanon	1–0	United Arab Emirates	Bishkek, Kyrgyzstan
12:00 UTC+6	Salha 54'	Report		Stadium: Dolen Omurzakov Stadium; Attendance: 0 Referee: Park Se-jin (South Korea)

24 October 2021 2022 Asian Cup qualification	Guam	0–3	Lebanon	Bishkek, Kyrgyzstan
17:00 UTC+6		Report	Tamim 29', 61'; Iskandar 47'	Stadium: Dolen Omurzakov Stadium; Attendance: 0 Referee: Wang Chieh (Chinese Taipei)

== Men's football ==
=== AFC Cup ===
==== 2021 ====
===== Zonal semi-finals =====
20 September 2021 2021 AFC Cup ZSF	Al-Muharraq (Bahrain)	3–0	(Lebanon) Al-Ahed	Arad, Bahrain
18:15 UTC+3	Jona 67'; Al Sherooqi 86'; Al-Hayki 90+2'	Live Report; Stats Report		Stadium: Al Muharraq Stadium; Attendance: 6,500; Referee: Ilgiz Tantashev (Uzbekistan)

==== 2022 ====
===== Group stage =====
====== Group A ======
Pos	Team	Pld	W	D	L	GF	GA	GD	Pts	Qualification	SEB	KSC	JAB	ANS
1	(Oman) Al-Seeb (H)	3	2	0	1	6	2	+4	6	Zonal semi-finals	—	—	1–0	—
2	Al-Kuwait	3	1	2	0	3	2	+1	5		2–1	—	—	—
3	(Syria) Jableh	3	1	1	1	1	1	0	4		—	0–0	—	1–0
4	(Lebanon) Al-Ansar	3	0	1	2	1	6	−5	1		0–4	1–1	—	—

Source: AFC
(H) Hosts

====== Group C ======
Pos	Team	Pld	W	D	L	GF	GA	GD	Pts	Qualification	EAR	TIS	NEJ	HAQ
1	(Bahrain) East Riffa (H)	3	1	2	0	5	3	+2	5	Zonal semi-finals	—	2–0	—	2–2
2	(Syria) Tishreen	3	1	1	1	3	3	0	4 (Note: Head-to-head points: Tishreen 3, Nejmeh 0.)		—	—	3–1	0–0
3	(Lebanon) Nejmeh	3	1	1	1	4	4	0	4		1–1	—	—	—
4	(Palestine) Hilal Al-Quds	3	0	2	1	2	4	−2	2		—	—	0–2	—

Source: AFC
(H) Hosts

=== Lebanese Premier League ===
Pos	Team	Pld	W	D	L	GF	GA	GD	Pts	Qualification or relegation (Note: Teams played each other once (11 matches), before the league was split into two groups (the top six and the bottom six), where each team played the other teams in their group twice (10 matches).)
1	Ahed (C)	19	14	5	0	37	6	+31	47	Qualification for AFC Cup group stage (Note: Nejmeh qualified for the AFC Cup group stage as 2021–22 Lebanese FA Cup winners.)
2	Ansar	19	10	5	4	34	13	+21	35	
3	Bourj	19	9	7	3	22	16	+6	34	
4	Shabab Sahel	19	8	3	8	28	32	−4	27	
5	Shabab Bourj (Note: Following Shabab Bourj's withdrawal from the league, all their matches in the championship round were voided. They were relegated instead of 11th-placed Safa.) (R)	11	4	2	5	15	17	−2	14 (Note: Head-to-head results: Shabab Bourj 0–0 Tadamon Sour)	Relegation to Lebanese Second Division
6	Tadamon Sour	19	3	5	11	15	28	−13	14	
7	Nejmeh (Note: Nejmeh forfeited in matchday 9 and were deducted 6 points. Ahed were awarded a 3–0 walkover win.)	21	9	9	3	29	16	+13	30	Qualification for AFC Cup group stage
8	Tripoli	21	8	5	8	23	24	−1	29	
9	Sagesse	21	8	3	10	17	32	−15	27	
10	Akhaa Ahli Aley	21	7	4	10	18	24	−6	25	
11	Safa	21	6	4	11	19	29	−10	22	
12	Sporting (R)	21	3	2	16	16	36	−20	11	Relegation to Lebanese Second Division

Source: Global Sports Archive
Rules for classification: 1) Points; 2) Head-to-head points; 3) Head-to-head goal difference; 4) Goal difference; 5) Goals scored; 6) Draw.
(C) Champions; (R) Relegated

=== Lebanese Second Division ===
Pos	Team	Pld	W	D	L	GF	GA	GD	Pts	Promotion or relegation (Note: Teams play each other once (11 matches), before the league is split into two groups (the top six and the bottom six).)
1	Chabab Ghazieh (C, P)	21	14	4	3	41	21	+20	46	Promotion to Lebanese Premier League
2	Salam Zgharta (P)	21	13	4	4	35	16	+19	43	Promotion to Lebanese Premier League
3	Racing Beirut	21	13	2	6	36	18	+18	41	
4	Nabi Chit	21	9	5	7	27	22	+5	32	
5	Nahda Barelias	21	7	4	10	23	33	−10	25	
6	Egtmaaey	21	7	1	13	20	38	−18	22	
7	Mabarra	21	7	6	8	17	17	0	27	
8	Islah Borj Shmali	21	6	7	8	19	26	−7	25	
9	Ahli Saida	21	7	4	10	23	30	−7	25	
10	Ahli Nabatieh	21	6	6	9	22	24	−2	24	
11	Shabab Majdal Anjar (R)	21	6	4	11	18	26	−8	22	Relegation to Lebanese Third Division
12	Sporting Qlaileh (R)	21	4	7	10	17	27	−10	19	Relegation to Lebanese Third Division

Source: Global Sports Archive
Rules for classification: 1) Points; 2) Head-to-head points; 3) Head-to-head goal difference; 4) Goal difference; 5) Goals scored; 6) Draw.
(C) Champions; (P) Promoted; (R) Relegated

=== Cup competitions ===
==== Lebanese FA Cup ====
===== Final =====
11 June 2022
15:30 UTC+3

Ansar (1)	1–2	Nejmeh (1)
Diarra 61'	Report	Alaaeddine 38'; Ghaddar 84'

Fouad Chehab Stadium, Jounieh
Referee: Abdulhadi Al Asmar Al Ruaile (Qatar)

==== Lebanese Elite Cup ====
===== Final =====
31 July 2021
17:00 UTC+3

Nejmeh	3–3	Ahed
Zein 29', 50'; Takaji 42'	Report	Nasser 34'; Kdouh 58'; Khamis 64'
Penalties
Al Saadi (penalty scored); Annan (penalty scored); Kourani (penalty scored); Chehade (penalty scored); Bader (penalty scored)	5–4	(penalty scored) Kdouh; (penalty scored) Monzer; (penalty scored) Zein; (penalty missed) Farran; (penalty scored) Dakik

Fouad Chehab Stadium, Jounieh
Referee: Hussein Abou Yehia

==== Lebanese Challenge Cup ====
===== Final =====
1 August 2021
17:00 UTC+3

Tripoli	4–2	Bourj
El Outa 6', 75'; Al-Mel 71', 83'	Report	Korhani 80', 88'

Fouad Chehab Stadium, Jounieh

==== Lebanese Super Cup ====
7 August 2021
16:00 UTC+3

Ansar	2–2	Nejmeh
Hijazi 68'; Ayoub 90+4'	Report	Zein 39'; Takaji 59'
Penalties
Maatouk (penalty scored); Ayoub (penalty scored); Tneich (penalty scored); Al Haj (penalty scored); Darwich (penalty scored)	5–4	(penalty scored) Al Saadi; (penalty scored) El Zein; (penalty scored) Kanso; (penalty scored) Kourani; (penalty missed) Ghaddar

Fouad Chehab Stadium, Jounieh
Referee: Ali Reda

== Women's football ==
=== Lebanese Women's Football League ===
Pos	Team	Pld	W	D	L	GF	GA	GD	Pts	Qualification
1	SAS	13	11	1	1	45	10	+35	34	Champions
2	Safa	13	10	2	1	59	7	+52	32	
3	EFP	13	8	2	3	61	17	+44	26	
4	BFA	13	7	3	3	45	16	+29	24	
5	Super Girls	13	3	1	9	24	42	−18	10	
6	ÓBerytus	13	3	1	9	25	46	−21	10	
7	Taadod Mazraat Chouf (Note: Taadod Mazraat Chouf withdrew and their matches from the second half of the season were annulled.)	7	1	1	5	4	34	−30	4	Withdraw
8	United Tripoli	13	0	1	12	4	95	−91	1	

Source: Global Sports Archive
Rules for classification: 1) Points; 2) Goal difference; 3) Number of goals scored
