= 2022–23 in Lebanese football =

Football in Lebanon
- Season: 2022–23

Men's football
- Premier League: Ahed
- Second Division: Racing Beirut
- Third Division: Irshad Chehim
- FA Cup: Nejmeh
- Elite Cup: Ahed
- Challenge Cup: Akhaa Ahli Aley
- Super Cup: Cancelled

Women's football
- Football League: SAS

The 2022–23 season was the 90th season of competitive football in Lebanon. The season officially began on 12 July 2021 with the Lebanese Elite Cup.

== National teams ==
=== Lebanon national football team ===
==== 2023 Intercontinental Cup ====
===== Round robin =====
Pos	Team	Pld	W	D	L	GF	GA	GD	Pts	Qualification
1	India (H)	3	2	1	0	3	0	+3	7	Advances to Final
2	Lebanon	3	1	2	0	3	1	+2	5	Advances to Final
3	Vanuatu	3	1	0	2	2	4	−2	3	
4	Mongolia	3	0	1	2	0	3	−3	1	

Source: AIFF
(H) Hosts

== Matches ==
===== Final =====
18 June 2023
19:30

India	2–0	Lebanon
Chhetri 46'; Chhangte 65'	Report

Kalinga Stadium, Bhubaneswar
Attendance: 12,600
Referee: Virendha Rai (Bhutan)

==== 2023 SAFF Championship ====
===== Group B =====
Pos	Team	Pld	W	D	L	GF	GA	GD	Pts	Qualification
1	Lebanon	3	3	0	0	7	1	+6	9	Qualified for Semi-finals
2	Bangladesh	3	2	0	1	6	4	+2	6	Qualified for Semi-finals
3	Maldives	3	1	0	2	3	4	−1	3	
4	Bhutan	3	0	0	3	2	9	−7	0	

Source: Global Sports Archive

===== Semi-final =====
1 July 2023 2023 SAFF Championship SF	Lebanon	0–0 (a.e.t.) (2–4 p)	India	Bangalore, India
19:30 UTC+5:30		Report		Stadium: Sree Kanteerava Stadium; Attendance: 19640; Referee: Hussain Sinan (Maldives)
	Penalties
	Hassan Maatouk (penalty missed); Walid Shour (penalty scored); Mohamad Omar Sadek (penalty scored); Khalil Bader (penalty missed)		(penalty scored) Sunil Chhetri; (penalty scored) Anwar Ali; (penalty scored) Mahesh Singh; (penalty scored) Udanta Singh

=== Lebanon women's national football team ===
==== 2022 WAFF Women's Championship ====
Team	Pld	W	D	L	GF	GA	GD	Pts
Jordan (H, C)	3	3	0	0	10	1	+9	9
Lebanon	3	2	0	1	9	4	+5	6
Syria	3	0	1	2	3	10	−7	1
Palestine	3	0	1	2	1	8	−7	1

Source: Global Sports Archive
(C) Champions; (H) Hosts

==== 2024 AFC Women's Olympic Qualifying Tournament ====
===== First round =====
Pos	Team	Pld	W	D	L	GF	GA	GD	Pts	Qualification
1	Chinese Taipei	2	2	0	0	9	1	+8	6	Second round
2	Lebanon (H)	2	1	0	1	6	5	+1	3	
3	Indonesia	2	0	0	2	0	9	−9	0	

Source: AFC
Rules for classification: Qualification tiebreakers
(H) Hosts

== Men's football ==
=== Lebanese Premier League ===
Pos	Team	Pld	W	D	L	GF	GA	GD	Pts	Qualification or relegation (Note: Teams played each other once (11 matches), before the league was split into two groups (the top six and the bottom six) where each team played the other teams in their group twice (10 matches). Teams carried over half their point tally from the first phase into the second phase.)
1	Ahed (C)	21	14	6	1	39	11	+28	36	Qualification for AFC Cup group stage (Note: Nejmeh qualified for the AFC Cup group stage as 2022–23 Lebanese FA Cup winners.)
2	Nejmeh	21	13	6	2	34	14	+20	34	Qualification for AFC Cup group stage
3	Ansar	21	13	6	2	45	16	+29	32	
4	Shabab Sahel	21	10	5	6	28	23	+5	23	
5	Bourj	21	9	5	7	25	26	−1	21	
6	Chabab Ghazieh	21	3	3	15	16	39	−23	6	
7	Tadamon Sour	21	8	6	7	30	24	+6	25	
8	Tripoli	21	5	8	8	19	35	−16	21	
9	Sagesse	21	6	3	12	18	26	−8	18	
10	Safa	21	4	8	9	18	30	−12	15 (Note: Head-to-head results: Salam Zgharta 0–0 Safa; Salam Zgharta 0–1 Safa; Safa 1–1 Salam Zgharta)	
11	Salam Zgharta (R)	21	4	6	11	15	26	−11	15	Relegation to Lebanese Second Division
12	Akhaa Ahli Aley (R)	21	4	4	13	20	37	−17	13	Relegation to Lebanese Second Division

Source: Global Sports Archive
Rules for classification: 1) Points; 2) Head-to-head points; 3) Head-to-head goal difference; 4) Goal difference; 5) Goals scored; 6) Disciplinary points.
(C) Champions; (R) Relegated

=== Lebanese Second Division ===
Pos	Team	Pld	W	D	L	GF	GA	GD	Pts	Promotion or relegation (Note: Teams played each other once (11 matches), before the league was split into two groups (the top six and the bottom six). Teams carried over half their point tally from the first phase into the second phase.)
1	Racing Beirut (C, P)	20	14	4	2	42	15	+27	34	Promotion to Lebanese Premier League
2	Ahli Nabatieh (P)	20	11	5	4	26	12	+14	29	Promotion to Lebanese Premier League
3	Islah Borj Shmali	20	11	2	7	30	24	+6	27	
4	Sporting	20	9	1	10	26	24	+2	20	
5	Shabab Baalbeck	20	7	4	9	26	35	−9	17	
6	Bint Jbeil	20	5	5	10	21	27	−6	13	
7	Riyadi Abbasiyah	18	10	4	4	32	16	+16	27	
8	Nahda Barelias	18	7	1	10	15	25	−10	16	
9	Egtmaaey	18	6	3	9	21	28	−7	15	
10	Mabarra	18	3	6	9	24	33	−9	13	
11	Ahli Saida (R)	18	3	3	12	16	40	−24	9	Relegation to Lebanese Third Division
12	Shabab Bourj (Note: Shabab Bourj withdrew and their matches from the first half of the season were annulled.) (R)	0	0	0	0	0	0	0	0	Withdraw

Source: Global Sports Archive
Rules for classification: 1) Points; 2) Head-to-head points; 3) Head-to-head goal difference; 4) Goal difference; 5) Goals scored; 6) Draw.
(C) Champions; (P) Promoted; (R) Relegated

=== Cup competitions ===
==== Lebanese FA Cup ====
===== Final =====
30 April 2023
14:00 UTC+3

Ahed (1)	0–0	Nejmeh (1)
	Report
Penalties
Haidar (penalty missed); Mansour (penalty scored); Melki (penalty scored); Al Haj (penalty scored); Erwin (penalty missed)	3–4	(penalty scored) Jefinho; (penalty scored) Barata; (penalty scored) Kourani; (penalty scored) Zein

Fouad Chehab Stadium, Jounieh
Referee: Mohamad Issa

==== Lebanese Elite Cup ====
===== Final =====
20 August 2022
16:30 UTC+3

Ahed	2–1	Ansar
Nasser 26'; Ataya 60'	Report	Maatouk 35' (pen.)

Amin Abdelnour Stadium, Bhamdoun
Referee: Hussein Abo Yehia

==== Lebanese Challenge Cup ====
===== Final =====
21 August 2022
16:30 UTC+3

Safa	0–1	Akhaa Ahli Aley
	Report	Abboud 6'

Tripoli Municipal Stadium, Tripoli
Referee: Ali Reda

==== Lebanese Super Cup ====
The 2022 Lebanese Super Cup was due to be the 22nd Lebanese Super Cup, an annual football match played between the winners of the previous season's Lebanese Premier League and Lebanese FA Cup. The match was scheduled on 28 August 2022, at Amin Abdelnour Stadium in Bhamdoun, between league winners Ahed and FA Cup winners Nejmeh. Due to violence between opposing fans before the encounter, the match was scrapped altogether.

== Women's football ==
=== Lebanese Women's Football League ===
==== Regular season ====
Pos	Team	Pld	W	D	L	GF	GA	GD	Pts	Qualification
1	SAS	10	9	1	0	46	6	+40	28	Qualification to the final four
2	EFP	10	7	1	2	49	7	+42	22	Qualification to the final four
3	BFA	10	7	0	3	48	15	+33	21	Qualification to the final four
4	Helium	10	3	0	7	13	27	−14	9 (Note: Head-to-head results: ÓBerytus 1–0 Helium; ÓBerytus 1–2 Helium)	Qualification to the final four
5	ÓBerytus	10	3	0	7	8	49	−41	9	
6	FC Beirut	10	0	0	10	0	60	−60	0	
7	Jabal (Note: Super Girls withdrew after matchday 1, while Jabal withdrew after matchday 5. All their results were annulled.)	0	0	0	0	0	0	0	0	Withdraw
8	Super Girls	0	0	0	0	0	0	0	0	Withdraw

Source: Global Sports Archive
Rules for classification: 1) Points; 2) Head-to-head points; 3) Head-to-head goal difference; 4) Goal difference; 5) Goals scored; 6) Disciplinary points.

==== Final four ====
Pos	Team	Pld	W	D	L	GF	GA	GD	Pts	Qualification
1	SAS	6	5	1	0	17	4	+13	16	Champions
2	BFA	6	3	2	1	20	7	+13	11	
3	EFP	6	2	1	3	13	12	+1	7	
4	Helium	6	0	0	6	1	28	−27	0	

Source: Global Sports Archive
Rules for classification: 1) Points; 2) Head-to-head points; 3) Head-to-head goal difference; 4) Goal difference; 5) Goals scored; 6) Disciplinary points.
