= 2022–23 Lebanese Premier League =

61st season of the Lebanese Premier League

Lebanese Premier League
- Season: 2022–23
- Dates: 2 September 2022 – 12 March 2023
- Champions: Ahed; 9th title
- Relegated: Akhaa Ahli Aley; Salam Zgharta
- AFC Cup: Ahed; Nejmeh
- Matches: 126
- Goals: 307 (2.44 per match)
- Top goalscorer: Elhadji Malick Tall (22 goals)
- Biggest win: Tripoli 0–6 Ansar (18 September 2022)
- Highest scoring: Tadamon Sour 5–2 Akhaa Ahli Aley (2 October 2022)
- Longest winning run: 6 matches Bourj
- Longest unbeaten run: 19 matches Ansar
- Longest winless run: 12 matches Safa; Salam Zgharta
- Longest losing run: 10 matches Chabab Ghazieh

The 2022–23 Lebanese Premier League was the 61st season of the Lebanese Premier League, the top Lebanese league for football clubs since its establishment in 1934. The league started on 2 September 2022, and ended on 12 March 2023.

It was the third season to feature a "split" format, following its introduction in the 2020–21 season, in which the season was divided into two phases. Ahed won their second consecutive title, and ninth overall. Akhaa Ahli Aley and Salam Zgharta were relegated to the Lebanese Second Division.

== Summary ==
=== Regulations ===
Each club had to involve two players under the age of 21 for at least 2,000 combined minutes, and three players for 3,000 combined minutes. Also, each club was allowed a maximum of eight players over the age of 30, with only five being able to be fielded in a game. In case a club was not able to meet the required number of minutes at the end of the season, they would have had three points deducted from their total in the league.

For the first time since the cancelled 2019–20 season, each club could have three foreign players under contract.

=== Format ===
Following its introduction in the 2020–21 season, the 2022–23 season consisted of two phases: in the first phase, each team played against one another once. In the second phase, the 12 teams were divided into two groups based on their position in the first phase. Contrary to the previous season, the teams only carried over half of their point tally from the first phase. After the first phase was completed, clubs could not move out of their own half in the league, even if they achieved more or fewer points than a higher or lower ranked team, respectively.

The top six teams played against each other twice; the champion automatically qualifies to the 2023–24 AFC Champions League qualifying play-offs—assuming they meet the criteria set by the Asian Football Confederation (AFC). The runners-up instead directly qualified to the 2023–24 AFC Cup group stage—as long as the champions meet the AFC criteria for the AFC Champions League. The bottom six teams also played against each other twice, with the bottom two teams being relegated to the Lebanese Second Division.

== Teams ==
Twelve teams competed in the league – the top ten teams from the 2021–22 Lebanese Premier League season and the two teams promoted from the Lebanese Second Division.

=== Stadiums and locations ===
Locations of the 2022–23 Lebanese Premier League teams
Beirut Lebanese Premier League clubs

Note: Table lists in alphabetical order.

Team	Location	Stadium	Capacity
Ahed	Beirut (Ouzai)	Al Ahed Stadium (Note: Only used as a training ground)	2,000
Akhaa Ahli Aley	Aley	Amin Abdelnour Stadium	3,500
Ansar	Beirut (Tariq El Jdideh)	Ansar Stadium	—N/a
Bourj	Beirut (Bourj el-Barajneh)	Bourj el-Barajneh Stadium	1,500
Chabab Ghazieh	Ghazieh	Kfarjoz Municipal Stadium	2,000
Nejmeh	Beirut (Ras Beirut)	Rafic Hariri Stadium	5,000
Safa	Beirut (Wata El Msaytbeh)	Safa Stadium	4,000
Sagesse	Beirut (Achrafieh)	Sin El Fil Stadium	—N/a
Salam Zgharta	Zgharta	Zgharta Sports Complex	5,000
Shabab Sahel	Beirut (Haret Hreik)	Shabab Al Sahel Stadium	—N/a
Tadamon Sour	Tyre	Sour Municipal Stadium	6,500
Tripoli	Tripoli	Tripoli Municipal Stadium	10,000

=== Foreign players ===
Lebanese clubs were allowed to have three foreign players at their disposal at any time, as well as two extra Palestinian players born in Lebanon in a given match sheet (both of whom could not be fielded at the same time in a match). Moreover, each club competing in an AFC competition was allowed to field one extra foreign player, to be only played in continental matches, as the AFC allowed four foreign players to play in the starting eleven (one of whom from an AFC country).

- Players in **bold** were registered during the mid-season transfer window.
- Players in italics left the club during the mid-season transfer window.

Team	Player 1	Player 2	Player 3	Palestinian player(s)	Former players
Ahed	(Nigeria) Emmanuel Obere	(Ghana) **Issah Yakubu**	(Scotland) Lee Erwin		(Nigeria) Samad Kadiri
Akhaa Ahli Aley	(Portugal) Carlos Lomba	(Spain) **Álex Chico**	(Brazil) **Laércio**	(Palestine) Wasim Abdalhadi	(Brazil) Fábio Vassalo (Slovenia) Patrik Bordon
Ansar	(Mali) Ichaka Diarra	(Tunisia) Houssem Louati	(Senegal) Elhadji Malick Tall	(Palestine) Mohamad Hebous	
Bourj	(Ghana) Richard Baffour	(Ghana) **Dennis Tetteh**		(Palestine) Zaher Samahe	(Ghana) Stephen Sarfo
Chabab Ghazieh	(Ghana) Ezra Amelinsa	(Nigeria) **Chizoba Ibe**	(Ghana) Titteh Gideou	(Palestine) Yasser Serhan	(Nigeria) Mani Ira Musa
Nejmeh	(Brazil) **Jefinho**	(Portugal) **Vítor Barata**	(Brazil) **Matheus Farinha**		(Senegal) Abdoulaye Fall (Democratic Republic of the Congo) Jean Baleke
Safa	(Mali) Issa Keita	(Senegal) Adramé Diallo	(Haiti) **Fredlin Mompremier**	(Palestine) Ayman Abou Sahyoun	(Syria) Alaa Hamadeh
Sagesse	(Senegal) **Papa Sidibe**	(Senegal) Mansa Konate	(Senegal) Boucounta Sarr	(Palestine) Mohammed Qasem	(Senegal) Sayed Payet
Salam Zgharta	(Nigeria) James Innocent	(Brazil) **Gerônimo**	(Brazil) Vinícius Calamari	(Palestine) Ibrahim Abdelwahhab	(Nigeria) Usule Martins
Shabab Sahel	(Nigeria) Andrew Ikefe	(Ghana) Emmanuel Nettey	(Nigeria) Bobby Clement	(Palestine) Hadi Dawkar	
Tadamon Sour				(Palestine) Adnan Salloum (Palestine) Ghassan Sarriyeh	(Ivory Coast) Biafri Nessemon Toussaint (Nigeria) Christian Obiozor (Senegal) Daouda Diop
Tripoli	(Jordan) **Suleiman Abu Zam'a**	(Jordan) **Ibrahim Al Rowwad**	(Republic of the Congo) **Mougbaya Beni de Dieu**	(Palestine) Omar Kayed (Palestine) Ahmad Yassine (Palestine) Yehya Ghafour	(Syria) Hael Al Badri (Syria) Ahmad Sayed Attieh El Ajjaj

== League table ==
Pos	Team	Pld	W	D	L	GF	GA	GD	Pts	Qualification or relegation (Note: Teams played each other once (11 matches), before the league was split into two groups (the top six and the bottom six) where each team played the other teams in their group twice (10 matches). Teams carried over half their point tally from the first phase into the second phase.)
1	Ahed (C)	21	14	6	1	39	11	+28	36	Qualification for AFC Cup group stage (Note: Nejmeh qualified for the AFC Cup group stage as 2022–23 Lebanese FA Cup winners.)
2	Nejmeh	21	13	6	2	34	14	+20	34	Qualification for AFC Cup group stage
3	Ansar	21	13	6	2	45	16	+29	32	
4	Shabab Sahel	21	10	5	6	28	23	+5	23	
5	Bourj	21	9	5	7	25	26	−1	21	
6	Chabab Ghazieh	21	3	3	15	16	39	−23	6	
7	Tadamon Sour	21	8	6	7	30	24	+6	25	
8	Tripoli	21	5	8	8	19	35	−16	21	
9	Sagesse	21	6	3	12	18	26	−8	18	
10	Safa	21	4	8	9	18	30	−12	15 (Note: Head-to-head results: Salam Zgharta 0–0 Safa; Salam Zgharta 0–1 Safa; Safa 1–1 Salam Zgharta)	
11	Salam Zgharta (R)	21	4	6	11	15	26	−11	15	Relegation to Lebanese Second Division
12	Akhaa Ahli Aley (R)	21	4	4	13	20	37	−17	13	Relegation to Lebanese Second Division

Source: Global Sports Archive
Rules for classification: 1) Points; 2) Head-to-head points; 3) Head-to-head goal difference; 4) Goal difference; 5) Goals scored; 6) Disciplinary points.
(C) Champions; (R) Relegated

== Season statistics ==
=== Top goalscorers ===
Rank	Player	Club	Goals
1	(Senegal) Elhadji Malick Tall	Ansar	22
2	(Lebanon) Hassan Maatouk	Ansar	10
2	(Lebanon) Mohamad Haidar	Ahed	10
4	(Senegal) Adramé Diallo	Safa	9
5	(Lebanon) Khalil Bader	Nejmeh	8
5	(Senegal) Boucounta Sarr	Sagesse	8
7	(Lebanon) Zein Farran	Shabab Sahel	7

=== Hat-tricks ===
Player	For	Against	Result	Date
(Lebanon) Mohamad Omar Sadek	Bourj	Tripoli	4–1	9 September 2022
(Senegal) Elhadji Malick Tall	Ansar	Tripoli	6–0	18 September 2022
(Senegal) Elhadji Malick Tall	Ansar	Chabab Ghazieh	4–0	7 January 2023
(Lebanon) Khalil Bader	Nejmeh	Shabab Sahel	4–1	11 February 2023
(Lebanon) Mohammad Al Massri	Akhaa Ahli Aley	Tripoli	4–0	12 February 2023

== See also ==
- 2022–23 Lebanese FA Cup
