= 2020–21 Lebanese Third Division =

Lebanese Third Division
- Season: 2020–21
- Dates: 19 March – 24 July 2021
- Champions: Sporting Qlaileh
- Promoted: Sporting Qlaileh; Shabab Majdal Anjar
- Relegated: Nojoom Beirut; Homenetmen; Ahli Sarba; Sharq; Okhwa Kharayeb; Amal Maaraka; Majd Tripoli; Amal Salam Zgharta
- Matches played: 174
- Goals scored: 563 (3.24 per match)
- Biggest win: Irshad Chehim 8–1 Sharq (17 April 2021); Salam Sour 8–1 Hilal Haret Naameh (27 June 2021)
- Highest scoring: Nahda Ain Baal 9–3 Harouf (25 June 2021)

The Lebanese Third Division (Arabic: الدوري اللبناني الدرجة الثالثة) is the third division of Lebanese football. It is controlled by the Lebanese Football Association. It operates on a system of promotion and relegation with the Lebanese Second Division and Lebanese Fourth Division.

== League table ==
=== Group A ===
Pos	Team	Pld	W	D	L	GF	GA	GD	Pts	Promotion or relegation
1	Shabab Majdal Anjar	12	7	2	3	25	5	+20	23	Qualification for promotion play-offs
2	Ittihad Haret Naameh	12	7	2	3	17	7	+10	23	
3	Homenmen	12	6	2	4	25	22	+3	20	
4	Wahda Marj	12	4	3	5	18	17	+1	15	
5	Zamalek Beirut	12	4	3	5	17	24	−7	15	
6	Nojoom Beirut (R)	12	4	0	8	16	28	−12	12	Relegation to Lebanese Fourth Division
7	Homenetmen (R)	12	4	0	8	9	24	−15	12	Relegation to Lebanese Fourth Division

Source: Goalzz
Rules for classification: 1) Points; 2) Head-to-head points; 3) Head-to-head goal difference; 4) Goal difference; 5) Goals scored; 6) Draw.
(R) Relegated

=== Group B ===
Pos	Team	Pld	W	D	L	GF	GA	GD	Pts	Promotion or relegation
1	Irshad Chehim	12	9	2	1	38	13	+25	29	Qualification for promotion play-offs
2	Salam Sour	12	6	3	3	25	15	+10	21	
3	Raya	12	6	2	4	17	16	+1	20	
4	Taqadom Anqoun	12	4	3	5	20	16	+4	15	
5	Hilal Haret Naameh	12	4	3	5	19	27	−8	15	
6	Ahli Sarba (R)	12	4	3	5	21	19	+2	15	Relegation to Lebanese Fourth Division
7	Sharq (R)	12	1	0	11	8	42	−34	3	Relegation to Lebanese Fourth Division

Source: Goalzz
Rules for classification: 1) Points; 2) Head-to-head points; 3) Head-to-head goal difference; 4) Goal difference; 5) Goals scored; 6) Draw.
(R) Relegated

=== Group C ===
Pos	Team	Pld	W	D	L	GF	GA	GD	Pts	Promotion or relegation
1	Sporting Qlaileh	12	8	2	2	24	7	+17	26	Qualification for promotion play-offs
2	Riyadi Abbasiya	12	7	2	3	22	15	+7	23	
3	Nahda Ain Baal	12	5	2	5	27	24	+3	17	
4	Harouf	12	5	2	5	17	20	−3	17	
5	Bint Jbeil	12	4	3	5	17	21	−4	15	
6	Okhwa Kharayeb (R)	12	4	1	7	13	16	−3	13	Relegation to Lebanese Fourth Division
7	Amal Maaraka (R)	12	3	0	9	13	30	−17	9	Relegation to Lebanese Fourth Division

Source: Goalzz
Rules for classification: 1) Points; 2) Head-to-head points; 3) Head-to-head goal difference; 4) Goal difference; 5) Goals scored; 6) Draw.
(R) Relegated

=== Group D ===
Pos	Team	Pld	W	D	L	GF	GA	GD	Pts	Promotion or relegation
1	Ansar Mawadda	12	10	1	1	27	6	+21	31	Qualification for promotion play-offs
2	Shabab Tripoli	12	9	0	3	26	10	+16	27	
3	Riada Wal Adab	12	5	2	5	18	16	+2	17	
4	Achbal Mina'a	12	4	4	4	17	16	+1	16	
5	Mahabbe Tripoli	12	4	3	5	17	16	+1	15	
6	Majd Tripoli (R)	12	3	1	8	20	38	−18	10	Relegation to Lebanese Fourth Division
7	Amal Salam Zgharta (R)	12	1	1	10	13	36	−23	4	Relegation to Lebanese Fourth Division

Source: Goalzz
Rules for classification: 1) Points; 2) Head-to-head points; 3) Head-to-head goal difference; 4) Goal difference; 5) Goals scored; 6) Draw.
(R) Relegated

== Promotion play-offs ==
Pos	Team	Pld	W	D	L	GF	GA	GD	Pts	Promotion or relegation
1	Sporting Qlaileh	3	2	1	0	6	2	+4	7	Promotion to Lebanese Second Division
2	Shabab Majdal Anjar	3	1	1	1	3	3	0	4	Promotion to Lebanese Second Division
3	Ansar Mawadda	3	0	2	1	5	6	−1	2	
4	Irshad Chehim	3	0	2	1	3	6	−3	2	

Source: Goalzz
Rules for classification: 1) Points; 2) Head-to-head points; 3) Head-to-head goal difference; 4) Goal difference; 5) Goals scored; 6) Draw.
