= 2021–22 Lebanese Second Division =

Lebanese Second Division
- Season: 2021–22
- Dates: 21 August 2021 – 23 January 2022
- Champions: Chabab Ghazieh
- Promoted: Chabab Ghazieh; Salam Zgharta
- Relegated: Sporting Qlaileh; Shabab Majdal Anjar
- Matches: 126
- Goals: 298 (2.37 per match)
- Top goalscorer: Wasim Abdalhadi; Mazen Jammal (12 goals each)
- Best goalkeeper: Hassan Hussein; Mahmoud Sidawi (9 clean sheets each)
- Biggest win: Nahda Barelias 0–5 Racing Beirut (12 December 2021)
- Highest scoring: Nabi Chit 5–2 Egtmaaey (12 December 2021)
- Longest winning run: 8 matches Salam Zgharta
- Longest unbeaten run: 12 matches Chabab Ghazieh
- Longest winless run: 12 matches Sporting Qlaileh
- Longest losing run: 5 matches Shabab Majdal Anjar; Mabarra

The Lebanese Second Division (Arabic: الدوري اللبناني الدرجة الثانية) is the second division of Lebanese football. It is controlled by the Lebanese Football Association. The top two teams qualify for the Lebanese Premier League and replace the relegated teams, while the bottom two are relegated to the Lebanese Third Division.

It was the second season to feature a "split" format, following its introduction in 2020–21, where the season was divided into two phases. The league was played between 21 August 2021 and 23 January 2022; Chabab Ghazieh and Salam Zgharta, who finished first and second respectively, were promoted to the Premier League, while Sporting Qlaileh and Shabab Majdal Anjar were relegated to the Third Division.

== Teams ==
Locations of the 2020–21 Lebanese Second Division teams

Team	Home city	2020–21 season
Ahli Nabatieh	Nabatieh	3rd in the Second Division
Ahli Saida	Sidon	5th in the Second Division
Chabab Ghazieh	Ghazieh	11th in the Premier League
Egtmaaey	Tripoli	8th in the Second Division
Islah Borj Shmali	Tyre	4th in the Second Division
Mabarra	Beirut	10th in the Second Division
Nabi Chit	Al-Nabi Shayth	9th in the Second Division
Nahda Barelias	Bar Elias	6th in the Second Division
Racing Beirut	Beirut	7th in the Second Division
Salam Zgharta	Zgharta	12th in the Premier League
Shabab Majdal Anjar	Majdal Anjar	2nd in the Third Division
Sporting Qlaileh	Qlaileh	1st in the Third Division

== League table ==
Pos	Team	Pld	W	D	L	GF	GA	GD	Pts	Promotion or relegation (Note: Teams play each other once (11 matches), before the league is split into two groups (the top six and the bottom six).)
1	Chabab Ghazieh (C, P)	21	14	4	3	41	21	+20	46	Promotion to Lebanese Premier League
2	Salam Zgharta (P)	21	13	4	4	35	16	+19	43	Promotion to Lebanese Premier League
3	Racing Beirut	21	13	2	6	36	18	+18	41	
4	Nabi Chit	21	9	5	7	27	22	+5	32	
5	Nahda Barelias	21	7	4	10	23	33	−10	25	
6	Egtmaaey	21	7	1	13	20	38	−18	22	
7	Mabarra	21	7	6	8	17	17	0	27	
8	Islah Borj Shmali	21	6	7	8	19	26	−7	25	
9	Ahli Saida	21	7	4	10	23	30	−7	25	
10	Ahli Nabatieh	21	6	6	9	22	24	−2	24	
11	Shabab Majdal Anjar (R)	21	6	4	11	18	26	−8	22	Relegation to Lebanese Third Division
12	Sporting Qlaileh (R)	21	4	7	10	17	27	−10	19	Relegation to Lebanese Third Division

Source: Global Sports Archive
Rules for classification: 1) Points; 2) Head-to-head points; 3) Head-to-head goal difference; 4) Goal difference; 5) Goals scored; 6) Draw.
(C) Champions; (P) Promoted; (R) Relegated

== Season statistics ==
=== Top scorers ===
Rank	Player	Club	Goals
1	(Palestine) Wasim Abdalhadi	Racing Beirut	12
1	(Lebanon) Mazen Jammal	Ahli Saida	12
3	(Lebanon) Haidar Abou Zeid	Chabab Ghazieh	11
4	(Lebanon) Mostafa Chehine	Salam Zgharta	10
5	(Lebanon) Walid Fattouh	Walid Fattouh	8
6	(Lebanon) Imad Ghaddar	Chabab Ghazieh	7

==== Hat-tricks ====
Player	For	Against	Result	Date
(Lebanon) Mazen Jammal	Ahli Saida	Islah Borj Shmali	3–1	18 September 2021
(Lebanon) Haidar Abou Zeid	Chabab Ghazieh	Shabab Majdal Anjar	4–2	3 October 2021
(Lebanon) Imad Ghaddar	Chabab Ghazieh	Ahli Saida	4–2	16 October 2021
(Lebanon) Mostafa Chehine	Salam Zgharta	Egtmaaey	4–0	26 December 2021
(Palestine) Wasim Abdalhadi	Racing Beirut	Nahda Barelias	4–1	23 January 2022

=== Top assists ===
Rank	Player	Club	Assists
1	(Lebanon) Abdallah Taleb	Salam Zgharta	8
2	(Lebanon) Wael Bayyad	Egtmaaey	5
2	(Palestine) Yasser Serhan	Chabab Ghazieh	5
2	(Palestine) Yehya El Masri	Ahli Saida	5
5	(Lebanon) Walid Fattouh	Salam Zgharta	4
5	(Lebanon) Ahmad Makki	Chabab Ghazieh	4
5	(Lebanon) Mohammad Chalhoub	Nabi Chit	4
5	(Lebanon) Imad Ghaddar	Chabab Ghazieh	4
5	(Lebanon) Haidar Abou Zeid	Chabab Ghazieh	4

=== Clean sheets ===
Rank	Player	Club	Clean sheets
1	(Lebanon) Hassan Hussein	Nabi Chit	9
1	(Lebanon) Mahmoud Sidawi	Salam Zgharta	9
3	(Lebanon) Ali Hajj Hassan	Racing Beirut	8
4	(Lebanon) Ahmad Kaawar	Mabarra	7
4	(Lebanon) Hussein Diab	Islah Borj Shmali	7
6	(Lebanon) Ahmad El Ahmad	Nahda Bar Elias	6
7	(Lebanon) Tarek Ahmad	Shabab Majdal Anjar	5
7	(Lebanon) Hassan Morsel	Ahli Saida	5
