= Kafarouman SC =

Lebanese football club

Kafarouman
- Full name: Kafarouman Sporting Club
- Founded: 2009; 16 years ago
- Ground: Nabatieh Municipal Stadium
- Capacity: 5,000
- Chairman: Ibrahim Abdo
- League: Lebanese Fourth Division
| Home colours | Away colours |

Kafarouman Sporting Club (Arabic: نادي كفررمان الرياضي) is a Lebanese football club that represents the Lebanese town of Kfar Remen in Nabatieh Governorate in Southern Lebanon.

In the 2012–2013 season, the club finished third in the play-offs of the Lebanese Fourth Division and they were promoted to the Lebanese Third Division for the first time ever in the history of the club. Kafarouman currently play in the Lebanese Fourth Division.
