= Homenetmen Beirut (football) =

Lebanese football club

- Full name: Homenetmen Sports Association Beirut
- Nickname: Homenetmenagan (The Orange Devils)
- Founded: 1924; 102 years ago
- Ground: Bourj Hammoud Stadium
- Capacity: 8,000
- Chairman: Stephan Der Bedrossian
- Head coach: Hassan Mashour Mido
- League: Lebanese Third Division
- 2025–26: Lebanese Fourth Division Beirut – Group A, 1st of 4 (promoted via play-offs)
Home colours

Homenetmen Sports Association Beirut (Arabic: الجمعية الرياضية هومنتمن بيروت; Armenian: Հայ Մարմնակրթական Ընդհանուր Միութիւն (ՀՄԸՄ), lit. 'Armenian General Athletic Union (HMƏM)') is a football club based in Beirut, Lebanon, that competes in the Lebanese Third Division. It is the association football branch of the larger Lebanese-Armenian multi-sports and scouting organisation of the same name.

Homenetmen Beirut was established in 1924, just six years after establishment of Homenetmen in Constantinople. The club won seven Lebanese Premier League and three Lebanese FA Cup titles. They also participated in the Asian Champion Club Tournament in 1970, finishing in third place.

== Name ==
The name "Homenetmen" (Arabic: هومنتمن) comes from the pronunciation of the acronym ՀՄԸՄ (HMƏN; ho-men-et-men) of the Armenian name of the organization (Հայ Մարմնակրթական Ընդհանուր Միութիւն), which means "Armenian General Athletic Union".

== History ==
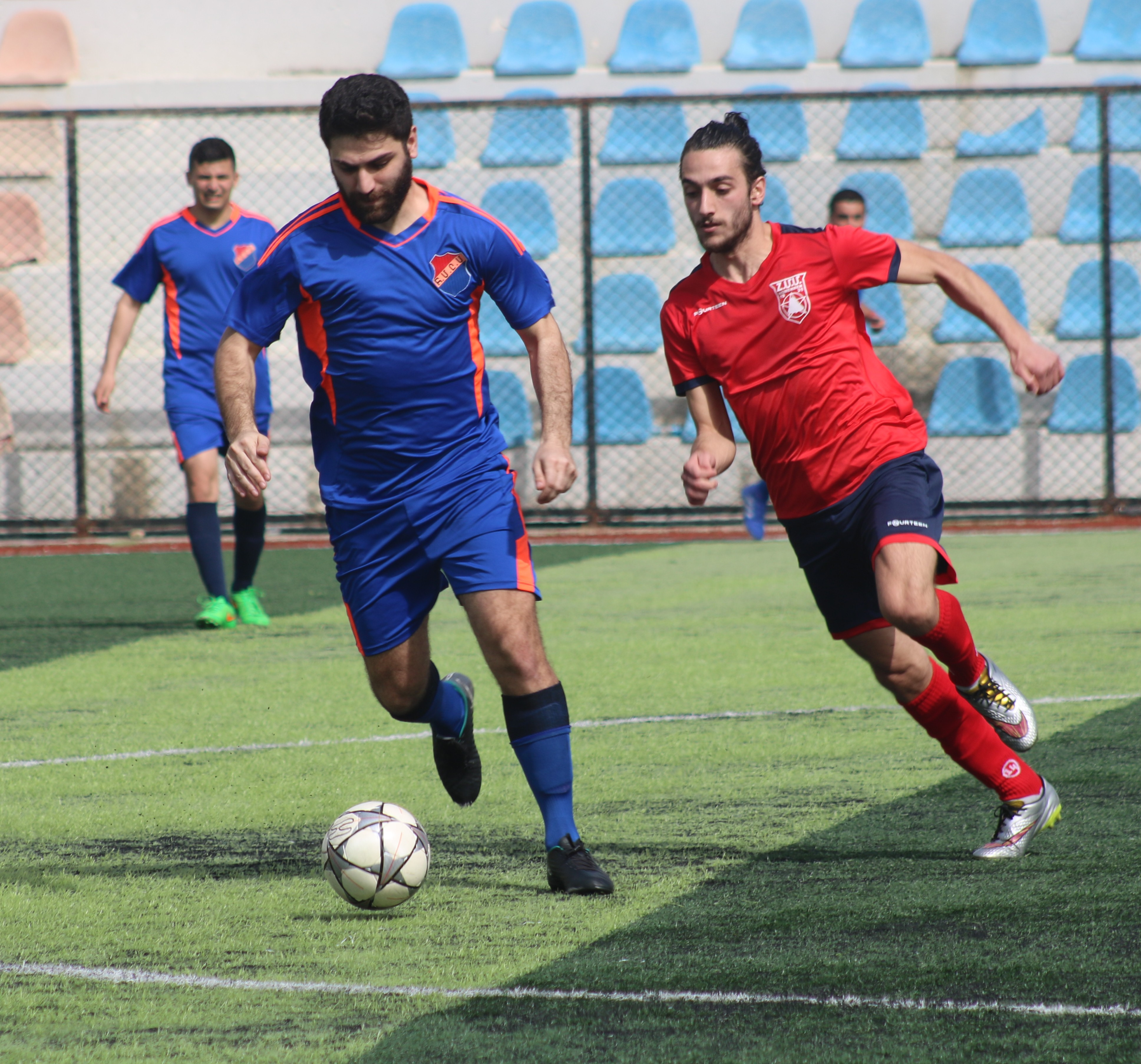
Homenetmen (blue) against Homenmen (red) in the 2020–21 Lebanese Third Division

Homenetmen Beirut were founded in 1924, as one of the oldest teams in the region. The initial headquarters of Homenetmen Lebanon were in the Zuqaq al-Blat quarter of Beirut, before moving to Bourj Hammoud. Homenetmen were affiliated to the Tashnag party. In 1927, the team played their first game against a foreign team in Aleppo, Syria, beating Homenetmen Aleppo 1–0.

Homenetmen first won the Lebanese Premier League in 1943–44; they won the league a further six times, holding a then-record seven titles. Homenetmen also finished as league runners-up seven times, and won the Lebanese FA Cup three times.

In 1970, Homenetmen represented Lebanon at the Asian Champion Club Tournament for the first time; having refused to play Hapoel Tel Aviv of Israel in the semi-final on political grounds, they beat PSMS Medan of Indonesia in the third-place match. Homenetmen's refusal to play Hapoel was one of the reasons for the Israel Football Association's expulsion from the Asian Football Confederation in 1974.

Following the Lebanese Civil War, Homenetmen fell into dismay: they were relegated to the Second Division for the first time in 2002, and to the Third Division in 2005. In 2021, Homenetmen were relegated to the Fourth Division. In 2026 they won the 2025–26 Fourth Division Beirut title, and were promoted to the Third Division via play-offs.

== Rivalries ==
Homenetmen have a historic rivalry with fellow-Lebanese-Armenian club Homenmen.

== Honours ==
- Lebanese Premier League
  - Winners (7): 1943–44, 1945–46, 1947–48, 1950–51, 1954–55, 1962–63, 1968–69
- Lebanese FA Cup
  - Winners (3): 1942–43, 1947–48, 1961–62
- Lebanese Second Division
  - Winners (1): 2002–03
- Lebanese Fourth Division
  - Winners (1): 2025–26 (Beirut)

== Asian record ==
- Asian Champion Club Tournament: 1 appearance

1970: Third place

== See also ==
- Armenians in Lebanon
- List of football clubs in Lebanon
