= 2021–22 Lebanese Premier League =

60th season of the Lebanese Premier League

Lebanese Premier League
- Season: 2021–22
- Dates: 11 September 2021 – 4 June 2022
- Champions: Ahed; 8th title
- Relegated: Shabab Bourj; Sporting
- AFC Cup: Ahed; Nejmeh
- Matches: 114
- Goals: 273 (2.39 per match)
- Top goalscorer: Mahmoud Siblini; Fadel Antar (10 goals each)
- Best goalkeeper: Mostafa Matar (11 clean sheets)
- Biggest win: Shabab Bourj 6–0 Sagesse (9 January 2022); Shabab Sahel 0–6 Ansar (10 March 2022)
- Highest scoring: Shabab Bourj 6–0 Sagesse (9 January 2022); Shabab Sahel 0–6 Ansar (10 March 2022)
- Longest winning run: 8 matches Bourj
- Longest unbeaten run: 19 matches Ahed
- Longest winless run: 8 matches Sporting
- Longest losing run: 7 matches Sporting

The 2021–22 Lebanese Premier League was the 60th season of the Lebanese Premier League, the top Lebanese league for association football clubs since its establishment in 1934. The league started on 11 September 2021 and ended on 4 June 2022.

It was the second season to feature a "split" format, following its introduction in the 2020–21 season, in which the season was divided into two phases. Ahed won their eighth league title undefeated. Defending champions Ansar, who won their 14th title in 2020–21, finished second. Sporting, who were newly promoted, and Shabab Bourj, who withdrew from the league, were relegated to the Lebanese Second Division.

== Summary ==
=== Regulations ===
Each club had to involve one player under the age of 22 for at least 600 minutes, two players for at least 800 combined minutes, and three players for at least 1,200 combined minutes. Also, each club was allowed a maximum of eight players over the age of 30, with only five being able to be fielded in a game. In case a club was to not meet the required number of minutes at the end of the season, they would have three points deducted from their total in the league.

Due to the economic situation in Lebanon, no foreign players were allowed to play in the league in the first half of the season. In the second half, teams were allowed to contract one foreign player, for the first time since October 2019.

=== Format ===
Following its introduction in the 2020–21 season, the 2021–22 season consisted of two phases: in the first phase, each team played against one another once. In the second phase, the 12 teams were divided into two groups based on their position in the first phase; the teams carried over their point tally from the first phase. After the first phase was completed, clubs could not move out of their own half in the league, even if they achieved more or fewer points than a higher or lower ranked team, respectively.

The top six teams played against each other twice, as opposed to the previous season where they played each other once; the champion automatically qualified to the 2023–24 AFC Champions League qualifying play-offs—assuming they met the criteria set by the Asian Football Confederation (AFC). The runners-up instead directly qualified to the 2023–24 AFC Cup group stage—as long as the champions met the AFC criteria for the AFC Champions League. The bottom six teams also played against each other twice, with the bottom two teams being relegated to the Lebanese Second Division.

=== Events ===
Following Nejmeh's refusal to play Ahed on 9 January 2022, the Lebanese Football Association (LFA) decided to assign a 3–0 walkover win to Ahed, deducted 6 points from Nejmeh, and fined them £L10 million. Nejmeh's decision not to play came as a form of protest against the refereeing in their game against Tadamon Sour one week prior.

Following Shabab Bourj's failure to comply to FIFA's request for them to compensate former player Lorougnon Christ Remi, and rumours of a merger with Safa, the club withdrew from the league. On 30 May 2022, the LFA announced that Shabab Bourj were fined £L12.5 million, were relegated to the Second Division, and that all of their matches in the championship round were voided.

== Teams ==
Twelve teams competed in the league – the top ten teams from the 2020–21 Lebanese Premier League season and the two teams promoted from the Lebanese Second Division.

=== Stadiums and locations ===
Locations of the 2021–22 Lebanese Premier League teams
Beirut Lebanese Premier League clubs

Note: Table lists in alphabetical order.

Team	Location	Stadium	Capacity
Ahed	Beirut (Ouzai)	Ahed Stadium (Note: Only used as a training ground)	2,000
Akhaa Ahli Aley	Aley	Amin Abdelnour Stadium	3,500
Ansar	Beirut (Tariq El Jdideh)	Ansar Stadium	—N/a
Bourj	Beirut (Bourj el-Barajneh)	Bourj el-Barajneh Stadium	1,500
Nejmeh	Beirut (Ras Beirut)	Rafic Hariri Stadium	5,000
Safa	Beirut (Wata El Msaytbeh)	Safa Stadium	4,000
Sagesse	Beirut (Achrafieh)	Sin El Fil Stadium	—N/a
Shabab Bourj	Beirut (Bourj el-Barajneh)	Bourj el-Barajneh Stadium	1,500
Shabab Sahel	Beirut (Haret Hreik)	Shabab Al Sahel Stadium	—N/a
Sporting	Beirut (Ras Beirut)	Rafic Hariri Stadium	5,000
Tadamon Sour	Tyre	Sour Municipal Stadium	6,500
Tripoli	Tripoli	Tripoli Municipal Stadium	22,000

=== Foreign players ===
Lebanese clubs were allowed to contract a foreign player for the second half of the season.

Team	Player
Ahed	(Tunisia) Ahmed Akaïchi
Akhaa Ahli Aley	(Ghana) Dennis Tetteh
Ansar	(Mali) Ichaka Diarra
Bourj	(Republic of the Congo) Bersyl Obassi
Nejmeh	(Brazil) Pedro Kadri
Safa	(Ghana) Nicholas Cofie
Sagesse	(Senegal) Boucounta Sarr
Shabab Bourj	
Shabab Sahel	(Nigeria) Christian Obiozor
Sporting	(Cameroon) Junior Mala
Tadamon Sour	
Tripoli	(Ghana) Joseph Ansah

== League table ==
Pos	Team	Pld	W	D	L	GF	GA	GD	Pts	Qualification or relegation (Note: Teams played each other once (11 matches), before the league was split into two groups (the top six and the bottom six), where each team played the other teams in their group twice (10 matches).)
1	Ahed (C)	19	14	5	0	37	6	+31	47	Qualification for AFC Cup group stage (Note: Nejmeh qualified for the AFC Cup group stage as 2021–22 Lebanese FA Cup winners.)
2	Ansar	19	10	5	4	34	13	+21	35	
3	Bourj	19	9	7	3	22	16	+6	34	
4	Shabab Sahel	19	8	3	8	28	32	−4	27	
5	Shabab Bourj (Note: Following Shabab Bourj's withdrawal from the league, all their matches in the championship round were voided. They were relegated instead of 11th-placed Safa.) (R)	11	4	2	5	15	17	−2	14 (Note: Head-to-head results: Shabab Bourj 0–0 Tadamon Sour)	Relegation to Lebanese Second Division
6	Tadamon Sour	19	3	5	11	15	28	−13	14	
7	Nejmeh (Note: Nejmeh forfeited in matchday 9 and were deducted 6 points. Ahed were awarded a 3–0 walkover win.)	21	9	9	3	29	16	+13	30	Qualification for AFC Cup group stage
8	Tripoli	21	8	5	8	23	24	−1	29	
9	Sagesse	21	8	3	10	17	32	−15	27	
10	Akhaa Ahli Aley	21	7	4	10	18	24	−6	25	
11	Safa	21	6	4	11	19	29	−10	22	
12	Sporting (R)	21	3	2	16	16	36	−20	11	Relegation to Lebanese Second Division

Source: Global Sports Archive
Rules for classification: 1) Points; 2) Head-to-head points; 3) Head-to-head goal difference; 4) Goal difference; 5) Goals scored; 6) Draw.
(C) Champions; (R) Relegated

== Season statistics ==
=== Scoring ===
==== Top goalscorers ====
Rank	Player	Club	Goals
1	(Lebanon) Mahmoud Siblini	Nejmeh	10
1	(Lebanon) Fadel Antar	Shabab Sahel	10
3	(Senegal) Boucounta Sarr	Sagesse	6
3	(Lebanon) Hussein Jawad Khalife	Shabab Sahel	6
3	(Lebanon) Ahmad Hijazi	Ansar	6
3	(Lebanon) Karim Darwich	Ansar	6
7	(Lebanon) Said Awada	Akhaa Ahli Aley	6
7	(Lebanon) Mohamad Kdouh	Ahed	6

==== Hat-tricks ====
Player	For	Against	Result	Date
(Lebanon) Fadel Antar	Shabab Sahel	Safa	5–0	18 September 2021
(Lebanon) Fadel Antar^{4}	Shabab Sahel	Tripoli	4–1	25 September 2021
(Lebanon) Mahmoud Siblini	Nejmeh	Akhaa Ahli Aley	3–0	11 March 2022
(Lebanon) Hussein Jawad Khalife	Shabab Sahel	Tadamon Sour	4–1	20 May 2022

Notes

^{4} Player scored 4 goals

=== Clean sheets ===
Rank	Player	Club	Clean sheets
1	(Lebanon) Mostafa Matar	Ahed	11
2	(Lebanon) Nazih Assaad	Ansar	10
3	(Lebanon) Ali Sabeh	Nejmeh	8
3	(Lebanon) Shaker Wehbe	Akhaa Ahli Aley	8
5	(Lebanon) Ahmad Korhani	Tripoli	7
6	(Lebanon) Hassan Moghnieh	Bourj	6
