= Amal Al Salam Zgharta FC =

Reserve team of Salam Zgharta

Amal Salam Zgharta
- Full name: Amal Al Salam Zgharta Football Club
- Short name: Amal
- Founded: 2015; 10 years ago
- Ground: Zgharta Sports Complex
- Capacity: 5,500
- Manager: Ghassan Khawaja
- League: Lebanese Fourth Division
- 2023–24: Lebanese Fourth Division North Lebanon Group C, 6th of 7
| Home colours | Away colours |

Amal Al Salam Zgharta Football Club (Arabic: نادي أمل السلام زغرتا الرياضي) is an association football club based in Zgharta, Lebanon, that competes in the Lebanese Fourth Division. Founded in 2015, Amal Salam Zgharta acts as Salam Zgharta's reserve team.

The club played the first round of the 2019–20 Lebanese FA Cup as one of two Lebanese Third Division clubs in the tournament; they were defeated 1–4 by AC Sporting.

== See also ==
- List of football clubs in Lebanon
