= Al Taqadom Anqoun Club =

Lebanese association football club

Taqadom Anqoun
- Full name: Al Taqadom Anqoun Club
- Founded: 1969; 57 years ago
- League: Lebanese Fourth Division
- 2024–25: Lebanese Third Division Group A, 5th of 6 (relegated via play-offs)
Home colours

Al Taqadom Anqoun Club (Arabic: نادي التقدم عنقون, lit. 'Anqoun Progress Club'), or simply Taqadom Anqoun, is a football club based in Anqoun, Lebanon, that competes in the Lebanese Fourth Division.

The club reached the quarter-finals of the 2018–19 Lebanese FA Cup as the only Lebanese Third Division club remaining in the tournament. They were defeated 6–0 by Nejmeh.

== See also ==
- List of football clubs in Lebanon
