= Dennis Tetteh =

Ghanaian footballer (born 1995)

Personal information
- Full name: Dennis Tennyson Tetteh
- Date of birth: 9 May 1995 (age 31)
- Place of birth: Ghana
- Height: 1.90 m (6 ft 3 in)
- Position: Forward

Team information
- Current team: Al-Kahrabaa
- Number: 17

Senior career*
Years	Team	Apps	(Gls)
2014–2015	Berekum Chelsea		
2015	Al Mokawloon	3	(0)
2015–2016	El Entag El Harby		
2016–2018	Tanta	27	(3)
2019–2021	Slavia Mozyr	51	(8)
2022	Akhaa Ahli Aley	9	(2)
2022–2023	Bourj	17	(1)
2023–	Al-Kahrabaa		
- * Club domestic league appearances and goals as of 11 March 2023

Dennis Tetteh (born 9 May 1995) is a Ghanaian professional footballer who plays as a forward for Al-Kahrabaa.

== Career ==
In June 2022, Tetteh joined Lebanese Premier League club Bourj FC.
