= Al Irshad Club Chehim =

Lebanese association football club

Irshad Chehim
- Full name: Al Irshad Club Chehim
- Founded: 9 November 2009; 17 years ago
- Chairman: Ghassan Oweidat
- Manager: Kassem Mahmoud
- League: Lebanese Second Division
- 2025–26: Lebanese Second Division, 10th of 12
Home colours	Away colours

Al Irshad Club Chehim (Arabic: نادي الإرشاد الرياضي شحيم, lit. 'The Guidance Sporting Club Shheem') is a football club based in Shheem, Lebanon, that competes in the Lebanese Second Division. Founded in 1992, the club was officially licensed in 2009. Irshad Chehim won a Lebanese Third Division, Lebanese Fourth Division and Lebanese Fifth Division.

== History ==
Irshad Chehim were founded in 1992, receiving their official license on 9 November 2009. In the 2012–13 season, the club won the Lebanese Fifth Division and gained promotion to the Lebanese Fourth Division. After two seasons, in 2015–16 they won the league title, gaining promotion to the Lebanese Third Division.

The club participated in the 2018–19 Lebanese FA Cup as one of three Third Division sides. After beating Second Division side Egtmaaey Tripoli 2–1 in the first round, Irshad Chehim qualified to the second round, where they lost 2–1 to Taqadom Anqoun. The following season, Irshad Chehim played in the 2019–20 Lebanese FA Cup as one of two Third Division clubs; they were defeated 1–4 by Mabarra.

Irshad Chehim were promoted to the Lebanese Second Division for the first time in their history, after winning the 2022–23 Lebanese Third Division play-offs.

== Honours ==
- Lebanese Third Division
  - Winners (1): 2022–23
- Lebanese Fourth Division
  - Winners (1): 2015–16
- Lebanese Fifth Division
  - Winners (1): 2012–13

== See also ==
- List of football clubs in Lebanon
