= 2020–21 Lebanese Premier League =

59th season of the Lebanese Premier League

Lebanese Premier League
- Season: 2020–21
- Dates: 3 October 2020 – 24 April 2021
- Champions: Ansar; 14th title
- Relegated: Chabab Ghazieh; Salam Zgharta
- AFC Cup: Ansar; Nejmeh
- Matches: 96
- Goals: 211 (2.2 per match)
- Top goalscorer: Hassan Maatouk (14 goals)
- Best goalkeeper: Ali Daher (10 clean sheets)
- Biggest win: Ansar 6–0 Salam Zgharta (8 December 2020)
- Highest scoring: Ansar 6–1 Safa (6 November 2020)
- Longest winning run: 4 matches Ansar; Nejmeh
- Longest unbeaten run: 15 matches Nejmeh
- Longest winless run: 16 matches Salam Zgharta
- Longest losing run: 12 matches Salam Zgharta
- Total attendance: 0 (Note: Due to the COVID-19 pandemic in Lebanon, all games were played behind closed doors.)

The 2020–21 Lebanese Premier League was the 59th season of the Lebanese Premier League, the top Lebanese professional league for association football clubs since its establishment in 1934. The league was initially scheduled to start on 18 September, before being postponed to 3 October as part of preventive measures by the state towards the COVID-19 pandemic.

It was the first season to feature a "split" format, in which the season was divided into two phases. In the first phase, each club played against each other once, for a total of 11 matchdays. In the second phase, the league was split into two halves – the "top six" and the "bottom six". Points were carried over from the first phase, and each club played five games within its own half. Due to the COVID-19 pandemic, all games in the season were played behind closed doors.

Since the 2019–20 season was cancelled, Ahed were the three-time defending champions, having won their 7th title in the 2018–19 season. Ansar won their 14th Lebanese Premier League title, their first since 2007, beating Nejmeh in the Beirut derby 2–1 in the final matchday.

== Summary ==
=== Regulations ===
On 24 June 2020, a player quota for the season was announced. Each club had to involve one player under the age of 22 for at least 600 minutes, two players for at least 800 combined minutes, and three players for at least 1,200 combined minutes. Also, each club was allowed a maximum of eight players over the age of 30, with only five being able to be fielded in a game. In case a club were to not meet the required number of minutes at the end of the season, they would have had three points deducted from their total in the league. Due to the economic situation in Lebanon, other regulations were introduced, namely the abolition of foreign players in the league.

=== Format ===
The 2020–21 season consisted of two phases: in the first phase, each team played against one another once. In the second phase, the 12 teams were divided into two groups based on their position in the first phase; the teams carried over their point tally from the first phase. After the first phase was completed, clubs could not move out of their own half in the league, even if they achieved more or fewer points than a higher or lower ranked team, respectively.

The top six teams played against each other once, with the champion automatically qualifying to the 2022 AFC Champions League qualifying play-offs—assuming they met the criteria set by the Asian Football Confederation (AFC). The runners-up instead directly qualified to the 2022 AFC Cup group stage—as long as the champions met the AFC criteria for the AFC Champions League. The bottom six teams also played against each other once, with the bottom two teams being relegated to the Lebanese Second Division.

== Teams ==
Twelve teams competed in the league – the top ten teams from the 2018–19 Lebanese Premier League season and the two teams promoted from the Second Division. Due to the 2019–20 season being cancelled, the same 12 teams participated in the 2020–21 season.

=== Stadiums and locations ===
Locations of the 2020–21 Lebanese Premier League teams
Beirut Lebanese Premier League clubs

Note: Table lists in alphabetical order.

Team	Location	Stadium	Capacity
Ahed	Beirut (Ouzai)	Ahed Stadium (Note: Only used as a training ground)	2,000
Akhaa Ahli Aley	Aley	Amin Abdelnour Stadium	3,500
Ansar	Beirut (Tariq El Jdideh)	Ansar Stadium	—N/a
Bourj	Beirut (Bourj el-Barajneh)	Bourj el-Barajneh Stadium	1,500
Chabab Ghazieh	Ghazieh	Kfarjoz Stadium	2,000
Nejmeh	Beirut (Ras Beirut)	Rafic Hariri Stadium	5,000
Safa	Beirut (Wata El-Museitbeh)	Safa Stadium	4,000
Salam Zgharta	Zgharta	Zgharta Sports Complex	5,000
Shabab Bourj	Beirut (Bourj el-Barajneh)	Bourj el-Barajneh Stadium	1,500
Shabab Sahel	Beirut (Haret Hreik)	Shabab Al Sahel Stadium	—N/a
Tadamon Sour	Tyre	Sour Municipal Stadium	6,500
Tripoli	Tripoli	Tripoli Municipal Stadium	22,000

== League table ==
Pos	Team	Pld	W	D	L	GF	GA	GD	Pts	Qualification or relegation (Note: Teams played each other once (11 matches), before the league was split into two groups (the top six and the bottom six) where they played each team in their group once (5 matches).)
1	Ansar (C)	16	13	1	2	37	8	+29	40	Qualification for AFC Cup group stage
2	Nejmeh	16	10	5	1	31	10	+21	35	Qualification for AFC Cup group stage
3	Shabab Sahel	16	8	3	5	15	11	+4	27	
4	Ahed	16	6	6	4	20	16	+4	24 (Note: Head-to-head results: Ahed 2–1 Safa, Safa 3–3 Ahed.)	
5	Safa	16	7	3	6	25	25	0	24	
6	Akhaa Ahli Aley	16	5	5	6	8	12	−4	20	
7	Bourj	16	5	8	3	18	13	+5	23 (Note: Head-to-head results: Shabab Bourj 0–1 Bourj, Bourj 1–1 Shabab Bourj.)	
8	Shabab Bourj	16	6	5	5	22	14	+8	23	
9	Tripoli	16	5	4	7	11	15	−4	19	
10	Tadamon Sour	16	3	7	6	7	12	−5	16	
11	Chabab Ghazieh (R)	16	3	2	11	12	26	−14	11	Relegation to Lebanese Second Division
12	Salam Zgharta (R)	16	0	1	15	6	50	−44	1	Relegation to Lebanese Second Division

Source: Global Sports Archive
Rules for classification: 1) Points; 2) Head-to-head points; 3) Head-to-head goal difference; 4) Goal difference; 5) Goals scored; 6) Draw.
(C) Champions; (R) Relegated

== Results ==
=== Matches 1–11 ===
Teams play each other once.

Home \ Away	AHE	ANS	AKH	BRJ	GHA	NEJ	SAF	SAL	SHB	SAH	TAD	TRI
Ahed	—	1–3	0–1	3–2	—	2–2	2–1	3–0	—	0–0	—	0–0
Ansar	—	—	—	—	3–0	1–2	6–1	6–0	2–0	0–1	—	—
Akhaa Ahli Aley	—	0–2	—	—	1–0	—	—	—	—	1–1	1–0	—
Bourj	—	0–3	0–0	—	3–0	—	—	—	—	0–0	0–0	—
Chabab Ghazieh	0–1	—	—	—	—	1–3	0–1	2–1	—	0–2	1–0	—
Nejmeh	—	—	1–1	2–0	—	—	—	4–0	—	—	2–0	—
Safa	—	—	0–2	1–4	—	1–1	—	5–0	—	0–1	—	—
Salam Zgharta	—	—	0–1	2–2	—	—	—	—	—	—	0–2	0–3
Shabab Bourj	1–1	—	2–0	0–1	4–1	1–1	1–2	3–0	—	0–1	1–1	0–1
Shabab Sahel	—	—	—	—	—	1–2	—	4–0	—	—	—	1–0
Tadamon Sour	0–0	0–1	—	—	—	—	0–3	—	—	0–1	—	—
Tripoli	—	0–1	0–0	0–0	2–1	0–3	0–3	—	—	—	0–0	—

Source: FA Lebanon
Legend: Blue = home team win; Yellow = draw; Red = away team win.

=== Matches 12–16 ===
After 11 matches, the league splits into two sections of six teams i.e. the top six and the bottom six, with the teams playing every other team in their section once.

==== Top six ====
Home \ Away	AHE	AKH	ANS	NEJ	SAF	SAH
Ahed	—	—	—	—	3–3	2–1
Akhaa Ahli Aley	0–2	—	—	0–0	—	—
Ansar	1–0	2–0	—	2–1	2–2	2–0
Nejmeh	1–0	—	—	—	—	3–0
Safa	—	1–0	—	0–3	—	—
Shabab Sahel	—	1–0	—	—	0–1	—

Source: FA Lebanon
Legend: Blue = home team win; Yellow = draw; Red = away team win.
For upcoming matches, an "a" indicates there is an article about the rivalry between the two participants.

==== Bottom six ====
Home \ Away	BRJ	GHA	SAL	SHB	TAD	TRI
Bourj	—	1–1	3–0	1–1	0–0	1–0
Chabab Ghazieh	—	—	—	1–2	—	—
Salam Zgharta	—	0–3	—	—	1–2	2–3
Shabab Bourj	—	—	4–0	—	0–0	2–1
Tadamon Sour	—	1–1	—	—	—	1–0
Tripoli	—	1–0	—	—	—	—

Source: FA Lebanon
Legend: Blue = home team win; Yellow = draw; Red = away team win.
For upcoming matches, an "a" indicates there is an article about the rivalry between the two participants.

== Season statistics ==
=== Scoring ===
==== Top goalscorers ====
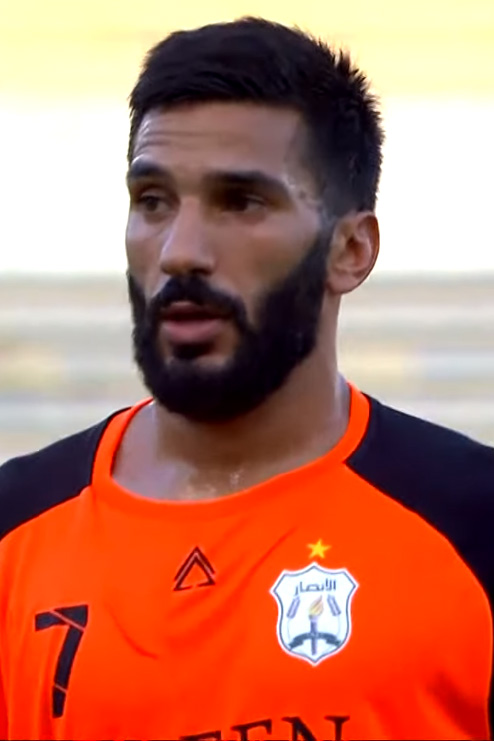
Hassan Maatouk won the Lebanese Premier League Golden Boot after scoring 14 goals, and was also the top assist provider with 7 assists.

Rank	Player	Club	Goals
1	(Lebanon) Hassan Maatouk	Ansar	14
2	(Lebanon) Adnan Melhem	Shabab Bourj	10
3	(Lebanon) Mohamad Kdouh	Ahed	7
3	(Lebanon) Akram Moghrabi	Tripoli	7
5	(Lebanon) Hassan "Moni" Chaito	Ansar	6
5	(Lebanon) Mahmoud Siblini	Nejmeh	6
7	(Lebanon) Ahmad Hijazi	Ansar	5
7	(Lebanon) Fadel Antar	Bourj	5
7	(Lebanon) Ali Hammoud	Ansar	5

==== Hat-tricks ====
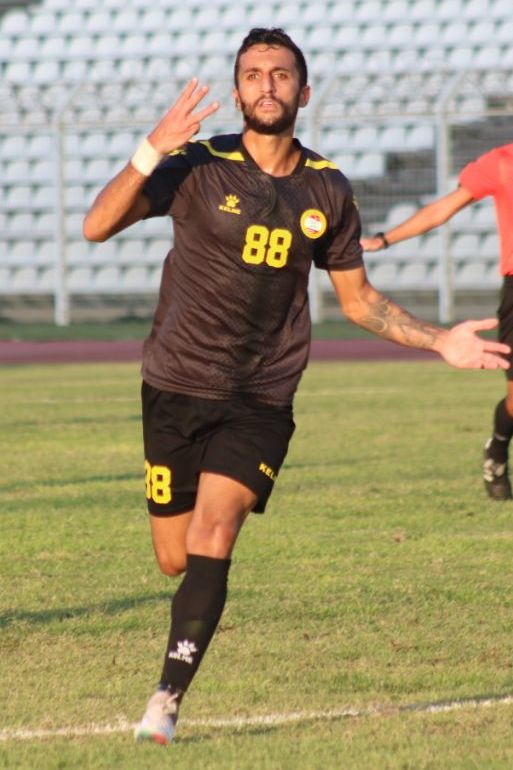
Mohamad Kdouh scored a hat-trick in the first matchday of the season.

Player	For	Against	Result	Date
(Lebanon) Mohamad Kdouh	Ahed	Bourj	3–2	4 October 2020
(Lebanon) Hassan Maatouk	Ansar	Bourj	3–0	26 December 2020
(Lebanon) Haidar Awada	Shabab Sahel	Salam Zgharta	4–0	27 December 2020
(Lebanon) Akram Moghrabi	Safa	Salam Zgharta	5–0	3 January 2021

=== Clean sheets ===
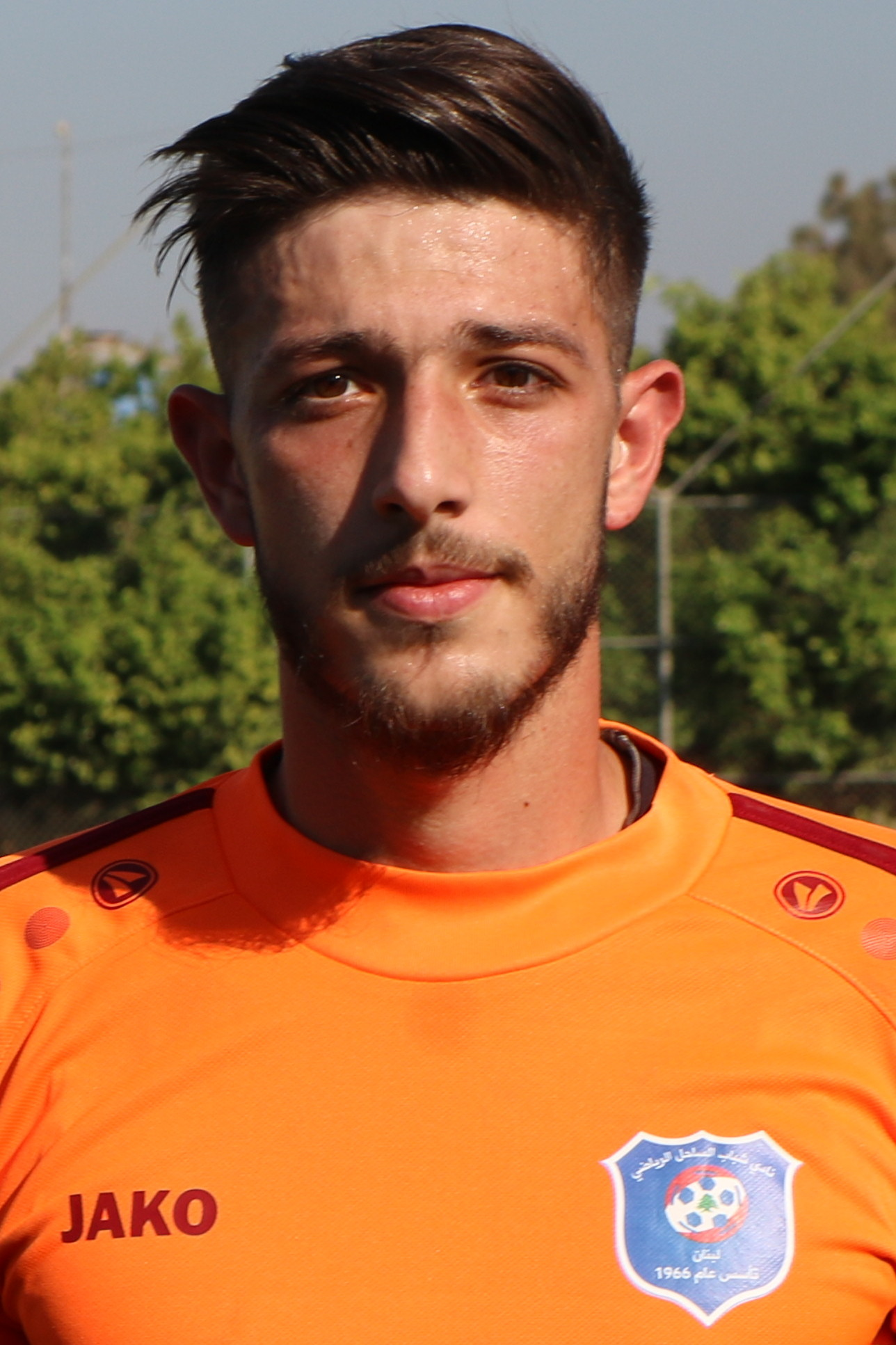
Ali Daher kept 10 clean sheets for Shabab Sahel, the most throughout the season.

Rank	Player	Club	Clean sheets
1	(Lebanon) Ali Daher	Shabab Sahel	10
2	(Lebanon) Abedelkarim Saleh	Bourj	9
3	(Lebanon) Nazih Assad	Ansar	8
3	(Lebanon) Shaker Wehbe	Akhaa Ahli Aley	8
5	(Lebanon) Mohamad Santina	Tadamon Sour	7
6	(Lebanon) Ali Sabeh	Nejmeh	6
7	(Lebanon) Mostafa Matar	Tripoli	5
8	(Lebanon) Talal Dandashli	Safa	4
8	(Lebanon) Mehdi Khalil	Ahed	4

=== Discipline ===
==== Player ====
- Most yellow cards: 8
  - (Lebanon) Jihad Ayoub (Ansar)
  - (Lebanon) Zouhair Abdallah (Shabab Sahel)
- Most red cards: 1
  - (Lebanon) Yasser Achour (Shabab Bourj)
  - (Lebanon) Ali Rmeity (Shabab Bourj)
  - (Lebanon) Hussein Sayed (Chabab Ghazieh)
  - (Lebanon) Kazzem Attieh (Tadamon Sour)
  - (Lebanon) Ali Abdallah Bitar (Tadamon Sour)
  - (Lebanon) Hussein Zein (Ahed)
  - (Lebanon) Ahmad Khatib (Bourj)
