= Andrew Ikefe =

Nigerian footballer (born 1998)

Personal information
- Full name: Andrew Evans Ikefe
- Date of birth: 10 October 1998 (age 28)
- Place of birth: Kaduna, Nigeria
- Position: Centre-back

Team information
- Current team: Al-Jaish

Senior career*
Years	Team	Apps	(Gls)
2016	Katsina United		
2017–2019	Niger Tornadoes		
2019	Kwara United		
2019–2022	Plateau United		
2022–2024	Shabab Sahel	4	(0)
2024	Al Ahed	1	(0)
2024–2025	Diyala		
2025–	Al-Jaish		
- * Club domestic league appearances and goals as of 15:48, 11 January 2025 (UTC)

Andrew Evans Ikefe (born 10 October 1998) is a Nigerian footballer who plays as a centre-back for Iraqi Premier Division League club Al-Jaish.

== Career ==
Ikefe joined Niger Tornadoes in the 2016–17 Nigeria Professional Football League (NPFL). Playing as a centre-back, he scored a goal in a NPFL match against Wikki Tourists which earned him a goal of the week nomination.

After two seasons, he moved on to spend the 2018–19 season with Kwara United. On 22 August 2019, Ikefe joined Plateau United ahead of the 2019–20 campaign, and he has since grown to become the club's vice captain.

Ikefe moved to Shabab Sahel in the Lebanese Premier League in August 2022. After spending two seasons with Sahel, Ikefe moved to Ahed in August 2024, remaining in the Lebanese Premier League.
