= Beirut derby =

Beirut derby (Arabic: ديربي بيروت) may refer to:

- Beirut derby (basketball), the basketball rivalry between Al Riyadi and Sagesse
- Beirut derby (football), the football rivalry between Ansar and Nejmeh
