= Football in Lebanon =

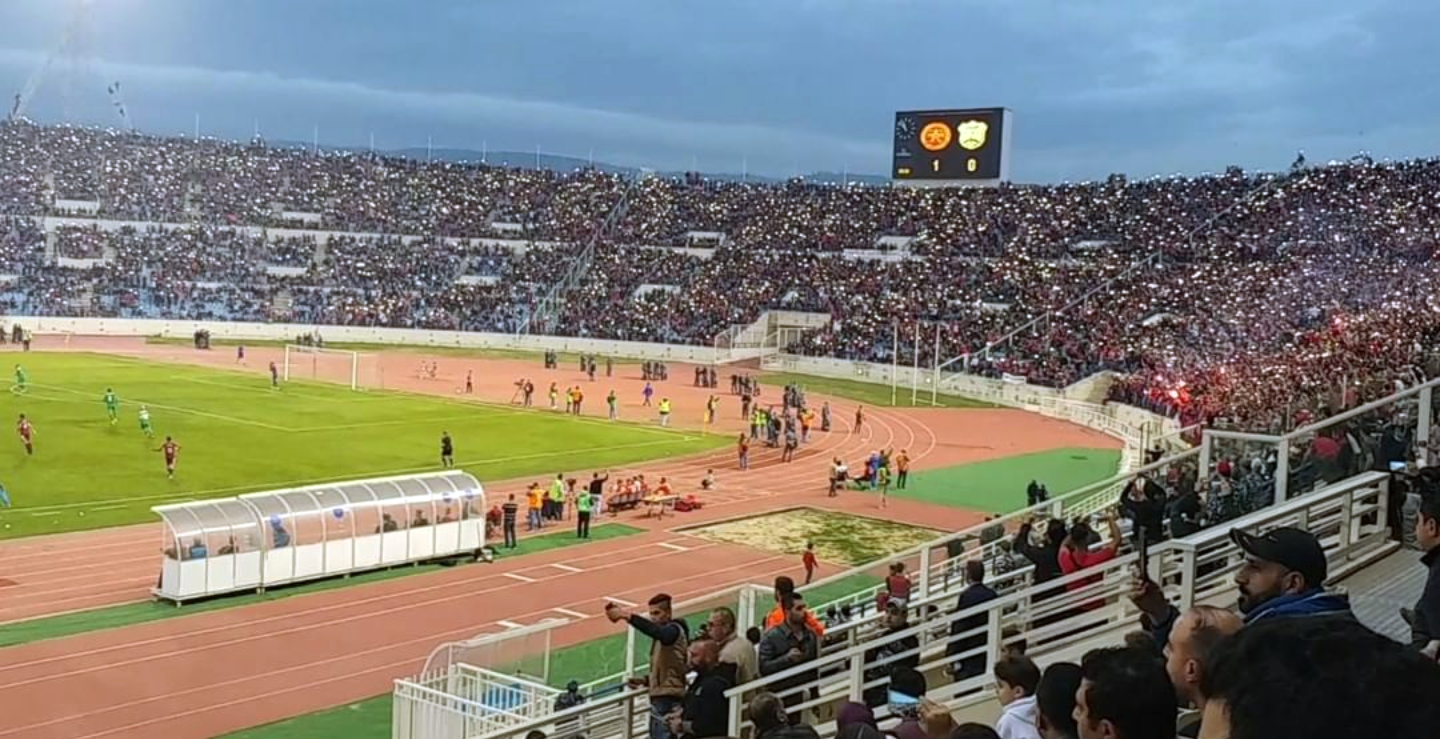
- The Camille Chamoun Sports City Stadium during the Beirut derby in 2018
- Country: Lebanon
- Governing body: Lebanon Football Association (LFA)
- National team: Lebanon
- First played: 1933
- Clubs: 213 (as of 2022–23)

National competitions
- FIFA World Cup; AFC Asian Cup; FIFA Arab Cup; WAFF Championship

Club competitions
- List: League: Lebanese Premier League Lebanese Second Division Lebanese Third Division Lebanese Fourth Division Lebanese Fifth Division; Cups: Lebanese FA Cup Lebanese Federation Cup Lebanese Super Cup

International competitions
- AFC Champions League; AFC Cup; Arab Club Champions Cup

Football is the most popular sport in Lebanon. It was introduced to Lebanon in the late-19th century, becoming particularly popular among teachers and students Christian schools. The Lebanese Football Association (LFA) was formed in 1933 as one of the earliest administrative bodies for association football in the Middle East. The Lebanon national team made its unofficial debut in 1935 against Romanian club CA Timișoara (T.A.C.), while their first official FIFA game was in 1940 against Mandatory Palestine.

Armenian clubs, namely Homenetmen and Homenmen, led the early football scene between the 1940s and the 1960s; the civil war between 1975 and 1990 made it impossible to practice football in Lebanon. Ansar became the dominating force in the country between the 1990s and the early-2000s, winning 11 consecutive league titles. In the 21st century, Ansar, Nejmeh, and Ahed (the latter in particular starting from the 2010s) formed a Lebanese "Big Three", winning the majority of the titles. Indeed, historically, the country's most-supported clubs are Ansar and Nejmeh, with Ahed gaining popularity in recent years.

While the Lebanon national team has never won a major title internationally, Ahed became the first Lebanese club to win the AFC Cup in 2019. The national under-17 team was the first Lebanon men's national team to lift a title, after finishing first in the 2026 WAFF U-17 Championship.

== History ==
=== Late 1800s–1940 ===
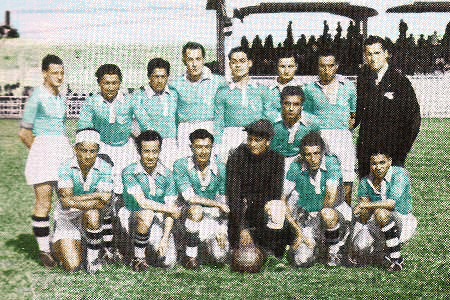
DPHB at Beirut Municipal Stadium's inaugural match in 1935

Football in Lebanon was introduced by the educated class. First popularized by students and teachers at the American University of Beirut (AUB) around 1908, the sport initially circulated as an elite activity within private and Christian missionary schools. Football grew rapidly in scale and organization during the French Mandate, significantly boosted by the arrival of Armenian refugees.

In 1931 Khalil Hilmi, a member of Riyadi, attempted to form a Federation. However, the proposal failed as Nahda opposed the formation. On 22 March 1933, representatives of thirteen football clubs gathered in the Minet El Hosn district in Beirut to form the Lebanese Football Association (LFA). Hussein Sejaan was the LFA's first president. Lebanon was one of the first nations in the Middle East to establish an administrative body for association football. (Note: The FA's of Iran, Egypt, Turkey, and Israel are older.) The Lebanese Premier League began in May 1934, with Nahda winning the first title. The LFA joined FIFA in 1936.

The first activity of the Lebanese national team began in 1935. Beirut XI, representing Lebanon, played against CA Timișoara (T.A.C.) of Romania: the game was considered the national team's first. The national team's first official FIFA game was a 5–1 loss to Mandatory Palestine on 27 April 1940, with Camille Cordahi scoring Lebanon's first official international goal.

=== Early history (1940–1975) ===
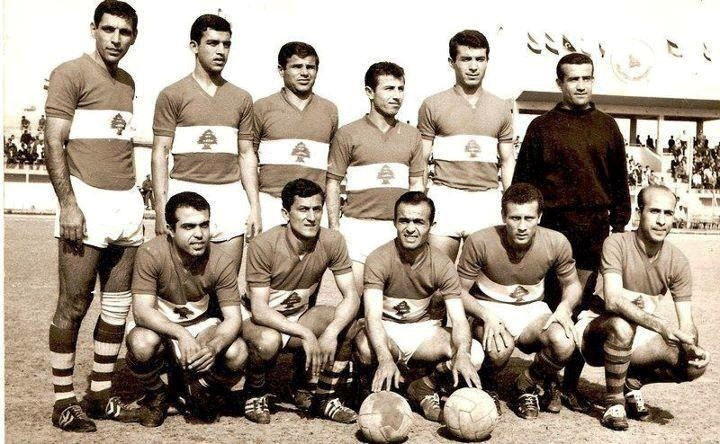
Lineup of the Lebanon national team at the 1966 Arab Cup

Most clubs were born on the basis of sectarianism, such as Sagesse being Maronite Christian, Nahda a Greek Orthodox team, and Ansar having a predominantly Sunni Muslim fanbase. A rivalry was established between Ansar and another Beirut club, Nejmeh: dubbed the Beirut derby, the match has been considered the biggest club football match in Lebanon.

Between the 1940s and 1960s, Armenian clubs, most notably Homenetmen and Homenmen, were the most prominent in the early Lebanese footballing scene. The two clubs shared 11 league titles in 16 seasons between 1943 and 1969. In 1964 the LFA joined the Asian Football Confederation (AFC).

Between the 1960s and 1975 Lebanese football was at its peak, with Nejmeh even beating USSR champions Ararat Yerevan in 1974. In 1975, one week before the Lebanese Civil War, Brazilian player Pelé played a friendly game for Nejmeh against a team of Lebanese Premier League stars. On the day of the game, 40,000 spectators were at the stadium from early morning to watch the match. From 1975 to 1990, the civil war made it impossible to practice football.

=== Post-Civil War (1990–present) ===
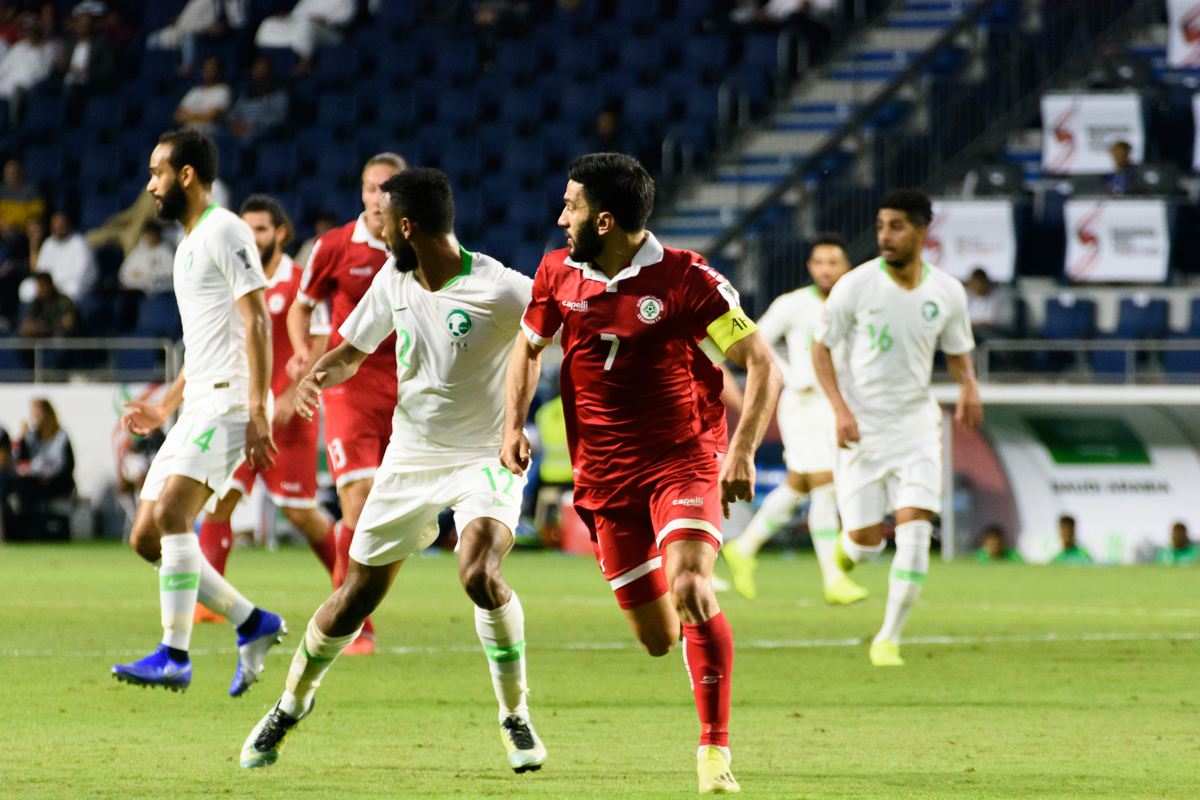
Lebanon during the 2019 Asian Cup game against Saudi Arabia

Following the civil war, players from lower-income families began to join football clubs, specifically from impoverished Sunni and Shia areas. Ansar set a Guinness World Record by winning 11 consecutive national titles between 1988 and 1999.

Lebanon hosted the 2000 AFC Asian Cup, with the national team finishing last in the group with only two points. In 2001, the LFA joined the West Asian Football Federation (WAFF) as one of its founding members. From 2000, Nejmeh were the dominating force in Lebanon, winning five out of nine league titles until 2009. In 2005 they reached the final of the AFC Cup, becoming the first Lebanese side to do so. However they lost to Al-Faisaly 4–2 on aggregate. During the 2010s Ahed, who had only won one league title prior, won six league titles. In the 2010–11 season Ahed won the league, cup, Super Cup and Elite Cup, becoming the first team in Lebanon to accomplish both a treble and a quadruple.

After winning the 2018–19 Lebanese Premier League Ahed became the three-time defending champions, a feat accomplished only one other time, by Ansar in 1992. In 2018 the national team qualified for their first ever major tournament: the 2019 AFC Asian Cup. They won their first game in the tournament on 17 January 2019, against North Korea 4–1 in the group stage; however, they narrowly missed out on the knock-out stage on the fair play rule. On 4 November 2019, Ahed became the first Lebanese side to win the AFC Cup after defeating April 25 in the 2019 final.

== League system ==
Level	Divisions (as of 2022–23)				
1	Lebanese Premier League (One national division, 12 clubs)				
2	Lebanese Second Division (One national division, 12 clubs)				
3	Lebanese Third Division (4 groups, 5–6 clubs per group)				
4	Lebanese Fourth Division; Beirut (1 group, 9 clubs)	Lebanese Fourth Division; Mount Lebanon (5 groups, 7 clubs per group)	Lebanese Fourth Division; North (4 groups, 7–8 clubs per group)	Lebanese Fourth Division; South (3 groups, 7–8 clubs per group)	Lebanese Fourth Division; Beqaa (2 groups, 7 clubs per group)
5	Lebanese Fifth Division; Beirut (1 group, 8 clubs)	Lebanese Fifth Division; Mount Lebanon (2 groups, 7 clubs per group)	Lebanese Fifth Division; North (2 groups, 4–5 clubs per group)	Lebanese Fifth Division; South (2 groups, 7–8 clubs per group)	Lebanese Fifth Division; Beqaa (2 groups, 5–6 clubs per group)

== Cup competitions ==
- The Lebanese FA Cup (1938–present), Nahda won the first title, is the national domestic cup competition. Teams from the Lebanese Premier League, Lebanese Second Division and Lebanese Third Division are eligible to compete in the competition.
- The Lebanese Federation Cup (1969–present) is the domestic league cup, contested by all Lebanese Premier League teams.
- The Lebanese Super Cup (1996–present) is a single match played between the winners of the Lebanese Premier League and the Lebanese FA Cup.
- The Lebanese Elite Cup (1996–2023) was an annual cup competition contested by the top six teams of the previous Lebanese Premier League season.
- The Lebanese Challenge Cup (1913–2023) was an annual cup competition contested by the teams placed between 7th and 10th in the previous Lebanese Premier League season and the two promoted teams from the Lebanese Second Division.

== National teams ==
=== Senior ===
The Lebanon national team played its first (unofficial) international game in 1935, against Romanian side CA Timișoara (TAC). Their first FIFA-ratified game came in 1940, in a 5–1 defeat to Mandatory Palestine.

Lebanon hosted the 2000 AFC Asian Cup and were eliminated from the group stage. They participated in the 2019 AFC Asian Cup, their first through regular qualification, winning their first game in the competition against North Korea in the group stage. However, Lebanon narrowly missed out on the knock-out stages by the fair-play rule.

=== Youth ===
At youth level, the U20 team took part in the AFC U-20 Asian Cup twice, reaching the quarter-finals in the 1973 edition. The U18 team made history as the first Lebanon men's national team to play in a final, finishing as runners-up in the 2021 WAFF U-18 Championship after losing to hosts Iraq on penalty shoot-outs. A year later, the U16 team reached the final of the 2022 WAFF U-16 Championship, where they lost to hosts Jordan 1–0. The U17 team reached the final of the 2025 WAFF U-17 Championship, before they lifted the 2026 WAFF U-17 Championship title, becoming the first Lebanese men's national team to win a title.

== Women's football ==
Women's football in Lebanon, while initially not very popular due to the social stigma attached to it, has seen a rise in popularity in the late-2010s. It is mainly played in the affluent areas of the country. The Lebanese Women's Football League was founded in 2008, with Sadaka winning the first title. Safa became the first Lebanese women's team to win an international competition, after winning the 2022 edition of the WAFF Women's Clubs Championship.

The women's national team came runners-up in the WAFF Women's Championship in 2022, and in third place in 2007 and in 2019. In 2015, the women's under-17 team became the first Lebanese national football team to win a title, after being crowned 2015 Arab U-17 Women's Cup champions. In 2019, Lebanon won both the WAFF U-15 Girls Championship and the WAFF U-18 Girls Championship, while in 2022 they won the WAFF U-18 Girls Championship for the second time. Lebanon won their third WAFF U-17 title in 2025.

== See also ==
- Sport in Lebanon

== Bibliography ==
- Henshaw, Richard (1979). The Encyclopedia of World Soccer. Washington, D.C.: New Republic Books. ISBN 0-915220-34-2.
- Sakr, Ali Hamidi (1992). موسوعة كرة القدم اللبنانية 1991–1992 [1991–1992 Lebanese Football Encyclopedia] (PDF) (in Arabic). مؤسسة نوفل للتوزيع. ISBN 0000281247.
