= Chabab SC Ghazieh =

Lebanese association football club

Chabab Ghazieh
- Full name: Chabab Sporting Club Ghazieh
- Short name: Ghazieh
- Founded: 1961; 65 years ago
- Ground: Kfarjoz Stadium
- Capacity: 2,000
- Chairman: Ali Hassoun
- Manager: Hussein Khalifeh
- League: Lebanese Second Division
- 2025–26: Lebanese Second Division, 8th of 12
Home colours	Away colours	Third colours

Chabab Sporting Club Ghazieh (Arabic: نادي الشباب الرياضي الغازيه, lit. 'Youth of Ghazieh Sporting Club'), known as Chabab Ghazieh or simply Ghazieh, is a football club based in Ghaziyeh, Lebanon, that competes in the Lebanese Second Division. Founded in 1961, the club plays their home matches at the Kfarjoz Stadium.

== History ==
Chabab Ghazieh against Shabab Sahel during the 2020–21 Lebanese Premier League

Chabab Ghazieh was founded in 1961 as a cultural, social and sporting association, with sport becoming its principal activity. The club established itself in the lower divisions during the 1990s and 2000s, winning the Lebanese Third Division in 1998–99 and again in 2005–06. Chabab Ghazieh subsequently won the Lebanese Second Division in 2006–07, earning promotion to the top flight for the first time in its history. The club made its Premier League debut in the 2008–09 Lebanese Premier League, with contemporary reports describing it as a newcomer to the top flight and noting that its promotion had been secured at the end of the preceding Second Division season.

Chabab Ghazieh remained in the Premier League for several seasons before being relegated at the end of the 2012–13 Lebanese Premier League, alongside Salam Sour. The club returned to the top flight immediately, winning promotion from the 2013–14 Lebanese Second Division alongside Nabi Chit. During the following 2014–15 season, the club recorded several notable results, including an early-season victory over Salam Zgharta that temporarily put it at the top of the league table after two rounds.

Chabab Ghazieh were relegated again at the end of the 2016–17 Lebanese Premier League. In March 2017, the club lost a decisive Second Division promotion play-off to Islah Borj Shmali, which secured promotion in its place. The following season, Chabab Ghazieh returned to the Premier League, with the club's promotion confirmed in March 2018; it was subsequently listed among the promoted teams for the 2018–19 Lebanese Premier League.

The club's return to the Premier League in 2018 began another three-season spell in the top flight. Chabab Ghazieh finished the 2020–21 Lebanese Premier League in 11th place and were relegated on 11 April 2021 despite defeating Salam Zgharta in their final match. Chabab Ghazieh quickly returned to the top flight, winning the 2021–22 Lebanese Second Division and securing promotion to the Premier League. The club's promotion was confirmed in January 2022 after a 3–1 victory over Ijtimaii, which left it top of the table with an unassailable lead over Salam Zgharta.

In September 2026, Chabab Ghazieh reached an agreement with Mabarra to take over the latter's position in the Lebanese Premier League following Mabarra's decision to suspend all football activities and dissolve its football teams, citing the difficult economic conditions in Lebanon. Under the arrangement, Chabab Ghazieh's players were to be registered with Mabarra, with the team initially competing in the 2026–27 Lebanese Premier League and Lebanese FA Cup under the Mabarra name. The team was subsequently expected to be renamed Chabab Ghazieh following the completion of the required administrative procedures.

== Club rivalries ==
Chabab Ghazieh has a rivalry with Tadamon Sour known as the South derby, reflecting the clubs' proximity in southern Lebanon.

== Players ==
=== Current squad ===
As of 28 January 2025

Note: Flags indicate national team as defined under FIFA eligibility rules; some limited exceptions apply. Players may hold more than one non-FIFA nationality.

No.	Pos.	Nation	Player
1	GK	LBN	Abdulkarim Saleh
2	DF	LBN	Jad Shalhoub
5	DF	GHA	Philip Larbi
6	MF	LBN	Ali Ahmad Ghaddar
7	FW	LBN	Mohammad Serdah
8	DF	LBN	Abdallah Halawi
9	FW	LBN	Imad Ghaddar
10	DF	LBN	Ali Kobeissi
11	MF	CIV	Kader Kourouma
12	DF	LBN	Mohamad Hamdan
14	FW	GHA	Francis Ghartey
15	MF	LBN	Kassem Leila

No.	Pos.	Nation	Player
16	DF	LBN	Zakaria Shalhoub
17	DF	LBN	Ayman Baalbaki
18	MF	CIV	Romuald Neuba
19	FW	LBN	Hassan Kawwam
20	MF	LBN	Mohammad Jaafar
21	DF	LBN	Hussein Kaawar
22	GK	LBN	Adam Tarraf
23	MF	LBN	Adam Serdah
24	MF	LBN	Jamil Ibrahim
25	MF	LBN	Samih Damaj
77	FW	LBN	Ayman Abou Sahyoun
—	DF	LBN	Jamal Khalifeh

== Honours ==
- Lebanese Second Division
  - Winners (2): 2013–14 (Group A), 2021–22
- Lebanese Third Division
  - Winners (2): 1998–99, 2005–06
- Lebanese Challenge Cup (defunct)
  - Runners-up (1): 2018

== See also ==
- List of football clubs in Lebanon
