= Islah Borj Al Shmali Club =

Association football club in Lebanon

Islah Borj Shmali
- Full name: Islah Borj Al Shmali Club
- Short name: Islah
- Founded: 1956; 70 years ago
- League: Lebanese Fourth Division
- 2024–25: Lebanese Third Division Group D, 5th of 6 (relegated via play-offs)
Home colours

Islah Borj Al Shmali Club (Arabic: نادي الإصلاح البرج الشمالي الرياضي), or simply Islah, is a football club based in Tyre, Lebanon, that competes in the Lebanese Fourth Division, and is primarily supported by the Shia Muslim community. Established in 1956, the club were promoted to the 2017–18 Lebanese Premier League, before being relegated back to the Lebanese Second Division.

== Honours ==
- Lebanese Third Division
  - Champions (1): 2013–14

== See also ==
- List of football clubs in Lebanon
