= List of football clubs in Lebanon =

This is a list of football clubs that compete within the leagues and divisions of the Lebanese football league system as far down as the Lebanese Third Division.

== By league and division ==
- Lebanese Premier League (Level 1)
- Lebanese Second Division (Level 2)
- Lebanese Third Division (Level 3)

== Alphabetically ==
The divisions are correct for the 2025–26 season.

=== Key ===
Key to divisional change
Club was promoted to a higher level
Club was relegated to a lower level
Club withdrew during the season

Club	League/Division	Lvl	Change from 2024–25
Ahed	Lebanese Premier League	1	
Ahli Nabatieh	Lebanese Second Division	2	Relegated from Lebanese Premier League
Ahli Saida	Lebanese Third Division	3	
Akhaa Ahli Aley	Lebanese Second Division	2	
Ansar	Lebanese Premier League	1	
Ansar Howara	Lebanese Third Division	3	Withdrew
Ansar Mawadda	Lebanese Third Division	3	
Athletico	Lebanese Third Division	3	Promoted from Lebanese Fourth Division
Bourj	Lebanese Premier League	1	Withdrew
BFA Sporting	Lebanese Second Division	2	
Chabab Ghazieh	Lebanese Second Division	2	Relegated from Lebanese Premier League
Egtmaaey	Lebanese Third Division	3	
Ghad Afdal	Lebanese Third Division	3	Promoted from Lebanese Fourth Division
Harakat Shabab	Lebanese Third Division	3	
Hilal Haret Naameh	Lebanese Third Division	3	
Hilal Nasr	Lebanese Second Division	2	Promoted from Lebanese Third Division
Homenmen	Lebanese Third Division	3	
Homenetmen Bourj Hammoud	Lebanese Third Division	3	Promoted from Lebanese Fourth Division
Hurr Ameli	Lebanese Third Division	3	
Irshad Chehim	Lebanese Second Division	2	
Ittihad Haret Naameh	Lebanese Second Division	2	Promoted from Lebanese Third Division
Jaish	Lebanese Third Division	3	
Jalil Qana	Lebanese Third Division	3	
Liwaa	Lebanese Third Division	3	Promoted from Lebanese Fourth Division
Mabarra	Lebanese Premier League	1	Promoted from Lebanese Second Division
Mahabbe Tripoli	Lebanese Third Division	3	
Nahda Ain Baal	Lebanese Third Division	3	
Nahda Barelias	Lebanese Third Division	3	Relegated from Lebanese Second Division
Nasser Bar Elias	Lebanese Third Division	3	
Nejmeh	Lebanese Premier League	1	
Olympic Dmit	Lebanese Third Division	3	
Okhwa Kharayeb	Lebanese Second Division	2	Withdrew
Raya	Lebanese Third Division	3	
Rissala Toura	Lebanese Second Division	2	
Riyadi Abbasiya	Lebanese Premier League	1	
Safa	Lebanese Premier League	1	
Sagesse	Lebanese Premier League	1	
Salam Sour	Lebanese Third Division	3	
Salam Zgharta	Lebanese Second Division	2	
Shabab Baalbeck	Lebanese Second Division	2	Relegated from Lebanese Premier League
Shabab Majdal Anjar	Lebanese Third Division	3	
Shabab Sahel	Lebanese Premier League	1	
Shabab Tripoli	Lebanese Third Division	3	
Shabab Houmine Tahta	Lebanese Third Division	3	
Tadamon Sour	Lebanese Premier League	1	
Tripoli	Lebanese Second Division	2	Relegated from Lebanese Premier League
Tawfeer	Lebanese Third Division	3	
Wehda Saadnayel	Lebanese Third Division	3	Relegated from Lebanese Second Division

== See also ==
- List of women's football clubs in Lebanon
- List of top-division football clubs in AFC countries
