= Homenmen Beirut =

Lebanese-Armenian multi-sports club

Homenmen
- Full name: Homenmen Sports Association Beirut
- Founded: 1921; 104 years ago
- League: Lebanese Third Division
- 2024–25: Lebanese Third Division Group A, 3rd of 6
- Website: homenmen.org
| Home colours | Away colours |

Homenmen Sports Association Beirut (Arabic: الجمعية الرياضية هومنمن بيروت; Armenian: Հայ Մարզական Միութիւն (ՀՄՄ), lit. 'Armenian Sports Union (HMM)'), or simply Homenmen, is a Lebanese-Armenian multi-sports club based in Beirut, Lebanon, section of the pan-Armenian sports and scouting organisation of the same name.

Founded in 1921, the football club competes in the Lebanese Third Division, having won the Lebanese Premier League four times, and the Lebanese Elite Cup once. Homenmen's activities also include table tennis, cycling, as well as a scouting program.

== Name ==
The name "Homenmen" (Arabic: هومنمن) comes from the pronunciation of the acronym ՀՄՄ (HMM; ho-men-men) of the Armenian name of the organization (Հայ Մարզական Միութիւն), which means "Armenian Sports Union".

== History ==
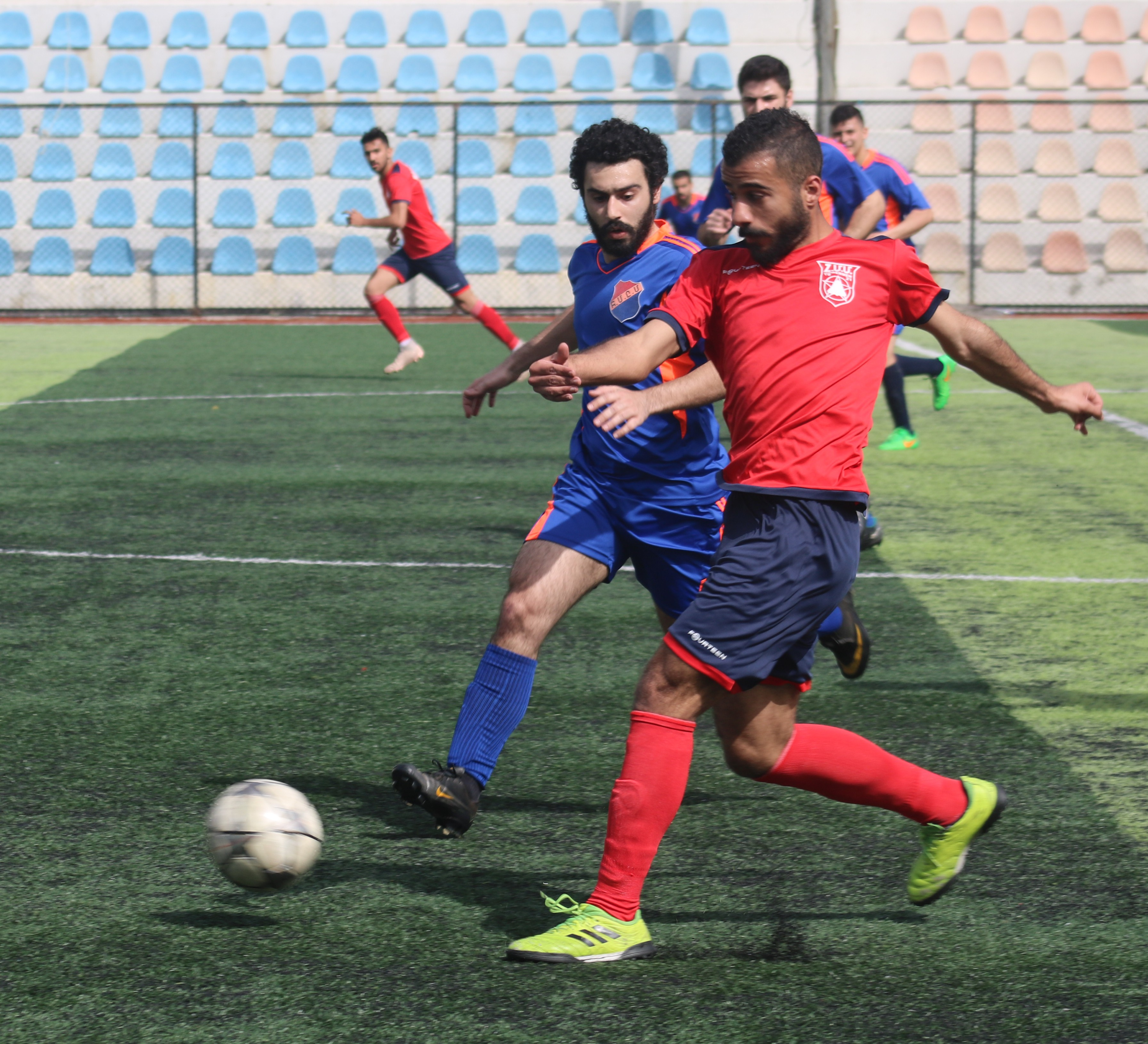
Homenmen (red) against Homenetmen (blue) in the 2020–21 Lebanese Third Division

Following the foundation of Homenmen on 27 January 1921, the Lebanese branch was formed in 1924. The club was among the founding members of the Lebanese Football Association in 1933. They were affiliated with the Hunchak party.

Homenmen played various clubs worldwide, most notably Hajduk Split in Yugoslavia in 1945, Al Ahly and Zamalek in Egypt in 1969, as well as multiple trips to Armenia. In 1995, they represented Lebanon at the Asian Cup Winners' Cup, and were eliminated in the second round. Homenmen participated once more, in 1999, where they were eliminated in the first round.

Homenmen's football team have won the Lebanese Premier League four times, in 1945, 1954, 1957 and 1961, and the Lebanese Elite Cup in 1999. They have also finished runners-up in the Lebanese FA Cup four times (1993, 1994, 1998 and 1999), and in the Lebanese Super Cup in 1999.

Among the most prominent historical players of Homenmen are Mardik Tchaparian, Babken Melikyan, Ahmad Sakr and Gevorg Karapetyan.

== Rivalries ==
Homenmen have a historic rivalry with fellow-Lebanese-Armenian club Homenetmen.

== Players ==
=== Notable players ===
Players in international competitions
| Competition | Player | National team |
|---|---|---|
| 2000 AFC Asian Cup | Ahmad Sakr | Lebanon |
| 2000 AFC Asian Cup | Gurgen Engibaryan | Lebanon |

== Honours ==
- Lebanese Premier League
  - Winners (4): 1945, 1954, 1957, 1961
- Lebanese Elite Cup (defunct)
  - Winners (1): 1999
- Lebanese FA Cup
  - Runners-up (4): 1992–93, 1993–94, 1997–98, 1998–99
- Lebanese Super Cup
  - Runners-up (2): 1998, 1999

== Asian record ==
- Asian Cup Winners' Cup: 2 appearances

1995: Second Round
1999–00: First Round

== See also ==
- Armenians in Lebanon
- List of football clubs in Lebanon
