= Shabab Majdal Anjar Club =

Lebanese football club

Shabab Majdal Anjar
- Full name: Shabab Majdal Anjar Club
- Founded: Unknown, as Racing Club Jounieh; 2 September 2009; 15 years ago, as Barjalona Sporting Club; December 2016; 8 years ago, as Shabab Majdal Anjar Club
- League: Lebanese Third Division
- 2023–24: Lebanese Third Division Group D, 1st of 5

Shabab Majdal Anjar Club (Arabic: نادي شباب مجدل عنجر) is a football club based in Majdal Anjar, Lebanon, that competes in the Lebanese Third Division.

== History ==
Formerly called Racing Club Jounieh (Arabic: نادي الراسينغ جونيه) and based in Jounieh, the club moved to Barja and changed their name to Barjalona Sporting Club (Arabic: نادي برجالونا الرياضي) on 2 September 2009.

In December 2016, the club's license was bought by Shabab Majdal Anjar Club (Arabic: نادي شباب مجدل عنجر) and moved to Majdal Anjar. The club finished runners-up in the 2020–21 Lebanese Third Division, and were promoted to the Lebanese Second Division.

== Honours ==
- Lebanese Third Division
  - Winners (1): 2004–05
