= Nahda Club Barelias =

Lebanese association football club

Nahda Barelias
- Full name: Nahda Club Barelias
- Short name: Nahda
- Founded: 1986; 40 years ago
- Chairman: Ahmad Hawari
- Manager: Ghaithan El Saimali
- League: Lebanese Third Division
- 2025–26: Lebanese Third Division Group A, 6th of 8
Home colours

Nahda Club Barelias (Arabic: نادي النهضة برالياس, lit. 'Renaissance Club Barelias'), or simply Nahda, is a football club based in Barelias, Beqaa, Lebanon, that competes in the Lebanese Third Division. The club was established in 1986 and competes in the Lebanese Second Division after gaining promotion from the Third Division in 2018.

== History ==
Founded in 1986, the football club is based in the Bekaa area of Lebanon. It was formed in the Lebanese Second Division as the sole representative of clubs in the Bekaa before going down to the Third Division, in which they stayed during the 2004–05 season. However, the following season the club was promoted back to the Second Division.

== Club rivalries ==
Nahda plays the Barelias derby with Nasser, as they are both based in the same city.

== Honours ==
- Lebanese Third Division
  - Champions (2): 2000–01, 2017–18

== See also ==
- List of football clubs in Lebanon
