= Bourj FC =

Lebanese association football club

Bourj
- Full name: Bourj Football Club
- Nickname: زعيم الضاحية (Leader of Dahieh)
- Founded: 1967; 59 years ago
- Ground: Bourj el-Barajneh Stadium
- Capacity: 1,500
- Chairman: Ali Rahal
- Manager: Mido
- League: Lebanese Second Division
- 2025–26: Lebanese Premier League, 12th of 12 (withdrew)
Home colours	Away colours

Bourj Football Club (Arabic: نادي البرج الرياضي, lit. 'Tower Sporting Club') is a football club based in Bourj el-Barajneh, Beirut, Lebanon, that competes in the Lebanese Second Division. Founded in 1967, the club has won one Lebanese FA Cup and two Lebanese Challenge Cups.

Nicknamed "the Leader of Dahieh" (Arabic: زعيم الضاحية), the club earned promotion to the Lebanese Premier League in 2019, for the first time in 16 years.

== History ==
In 1993 Bourj, captained by Mohammad Ismail, won the final the Lebanese FA Cup 4–1 in extra time, against Homenmen. Mallarby and Hassan Rahhal scored a brace each, while Papken Melikian scored the sole goal for the opposing team. This was the second replay of the final, after both previous encounters ended in a draw after extra time. In 2008, Bourj FC were relegated to the Fourth Division.

On 1 August 2021, Bourj won the Lebanese Challenge Cup for the second time, beating Tripoli in the 2021 final; they refused to attend the crowing ceremony, following a verbal altercation between Fadi Nasser, Bourj's president, and a member of the Lebanese Football Association (LFA)'s executive committee. On 2 August, the LFA imposed a fine of £L22 million on the club. The same day, Bourj announced their withdrawal from the Lebanese Premier League through their social media, and that they would not pay the fine imposed. They eventually took part in the 2020–21 season.

On 12 January 2026, Bourj announced their withdrawal from the Lebanese Premier League after matchday 11 due to financial difficulties. Following the decision, the club released all its first-team players and were automatically placed at the bottom of the league for the remainder of the 2025–26 season.

== Supporters ==
Founded as the first club in the area, Bourj is considered to be the representative of all the families of the town. Following the introduction of ultras groups in Lebanon in 2018, "Ultras Borjawi" (Arabic: ألتراس برجاوي) was formed at the start of the 2018–19 Lebanese Second Division season.

== Club rivalries ==
Bourj's main rival have historically been Shabab Sahel, as they both fight for supremacy over the Dahieh suburbs. The match has been dubbed the Dahieh derby. Another important rivalry is with Shabab Bourj, because they are both based in the Bourj el-Barajneh district.

== Players ==
=== Current squad ===
As of 06 October 2026

Note: Flags indicate national team as defined under FIFA eligibility rules; some limited exceptions apply. Players may hold more than one non-FIFA nationality.

No.	Pos.	Nation	Player
—	GK	LBN	Hassan Hazime
—	GK	LBN	Toufic Nahle (On loan from Ahed)
—	DF	LBN	Hassan Fardos
—	DF	LBN	Mohamad Hamdan
—	DF	LBN	Ali Hareb
—	DF	LBN	Mohammad Fneich
—	DF	LBN	Abdallah Hijazi
—	MF	LBN	Issa Khreis
—	MF	LBN	Sami Maanaki
—	MF	LBN	Ahmad Hamad

No.	Pos.	Nation	Player
—	MF	LBN	Tarek Turkmani
—	MF	LBN	Ali Reslan
—	MF	LBN	Elijess Ghanem
—	MF	LBN	Joseph Aoun
—	MF	LBN	Mohammad Iskandar
—	MF	LBN	Ali Sabra
—	FW	LBN	Mohammad Nasserdine
—	FW	LBN	Ali Rahhal
—	FW	LBN	Hussein Hawi
—	FW	LBN	Ouday Chmouri
—	FW	LBN	Issa Bazzi

== Notable players ==
Players in international competitions
Competition	Player	National team
2023 AFC Asian Cup	Hilal El-Helwe	Lebanon

== Honours ==
- Lebanese FA Cup
  - Winners (1): 1992–93
- Lebanese Challenge Cup (defunct)
  - Winners (2; record): 2019, 2021
- Lebanese Second Division
  - Winners (3): 1990–91, 2000–01, 2018–19
- Lebanese Third Division
  - Winners (1): 2016–17

== See also ==
- List of football clubs in Lebanon
