= Lebanese Third Division =

Third tier of the football pyramid of professional football league in Lebanon

- Founded: 1950; 76 years ago
- Country: Lebanon
- Confederation: AFC
- Number of clubs: 28
- Level on pyramid: 3
- Promotion to: Lebanese Second Division
- Relegation to: Lebanese Fourth Division
- Current champions: Ghad Afdal (2025–26)
- Current: 2025–26 Lebanese Third Division

The Lebanese Third Division (Arabic: الدوري اللبناني الدرجة الثالثة) is the third division of Lebanese football, and is controlled by the Lebanese Football Association.

The 24 teams are divided into three groups of eight teams each; the first two teams of each group qualify to the playoffs and the first two teams of these playoffs qualify to the Lebanese Second Division and replace the relegated teams. On the other hand, the last two teams take part in the relegation round that will decide which two of these four teams will be relegated to the Lebanese Fourth Division.

== Clubs ==
=== Champions ===
Season	Champion
1950 to 1964	Unknown
1964–65	Riada Wal Adab
1965–66	Unknown
1966–67	Zamalek Beirut
1967 to 1991	Unknown
1991–92	Achbal Chekka
1992–93	Farj Zgharta
1993–94	Rawda Dekwaneh
1994–95	Unknown
1995–96	Salam Sour
1996–97	Irshad
1997–98	Unknown
1998–99	Chabab Ghazieh
1999–2000	Shabab Khiam
2000–01	Nahda Barelias
2001–02	Unknown
2002–03	Nejmet Sahra
2003–04	Nasser Bar Elias
2004–05	Racing Jounieh
2005–06	Chabab Ghazieh

Season	Champion
2006–07	Ijtimaii
2007–08	Riada Wal Adab
2008–09	Salam Sour
2009–10	Harakat Shabab
2010–11	Fajr Arabsalim
2011–12	Nasser Bar Elias
2012–13	Tadamon Beirut
2013–14	Islah Borj Shmali
2014–15	Amal Maarka
2015–16	Nasser Bar Elias
2016–17	Bourj
2017–18	Nahda Barelias
2018–19	Sporting
2019–20	Not awarded
2020–21	Sporting Qlaileh
2021–22	Riyadi Abbasiya
2022–23	Irshad Chehim
2023–24	Rissala Toura
2024–25	Ittihad Haret Naameh
2025–26	Ghad Afdal

=== 2025–26 season ===
Group A

- Ansar Howara
- Athletico
- Jaish
- Nahda Ain Baal
- Nahda Bar Elias
- Olympic Dmit
- Salam Sour
- Shabab Tripoli

Group B

- Ahli Saida
- Ghad Afdal
- Harakat Shabab
- Homenetmen Bourj Hammoud
- Hurr Ameli
- Ijtimaii
- Jalil Qana
- Tawfeer

Group C

- Ansar Mawadda
- Hilal Haret Naameh
- Homenmen Beirut
- Liwaa
- Mawadda Tripoli
- Shabab Houmine Tahta
- Shabab Majdal Anjar
- Wehda Saadnayel
