= Lebanese football league system =

- Country: Lebanon
- Sport: Association football
- Promotion and relegation: Yes (for men); No (for women)

National system
- Federation: Lebanese Football Association
- Confederation: AFC
- Top division: Premier League (men); Women's Football League (women)
- Second division: Second Division
- Cup competition: Men: Federation Cup; FA Cup; Super Cup; Women: Women's FA Cup; Women's Super Cup

The Lebanese football league system (Arabic: نظام الدوري اللبناني لكرة القدم), also known as the Lebanese football pyramid, is a series of interconnected leagues for men's association football clubs in Lebanon. The system has a hierarchical format with promotion and relegation between leagues at different levels, allowing even the smallest club the theoretical possibility of ultimately rising to the very top of the system. There are five individual leagues, containing 30 groups.

The exact number of clubs varies from year to year as clubs join and leave leagues, fold or merge altogether, but an estimated average of 7 clubs per group implies that about 200 clubs are members of a league in the Lebanese men's football league system.

== Structure ==
=== Men ===
The Lebanese football pyramid is composed of five leagues, all governed by the Lebanese Football Association, which operate on a system of promotion and relegation. The first tier of Lebanese football is the Lebanese Premier League, which is made up of 12 teams. Next is the Lebanese Second Division, which also has 12 teams. Both of these leagues cover the whole of Lebanon. The first two leagues participate in the Lebanese FA Cup, the national domestic cup competition.

The third tier is the Lebanese Third Division, one division split into four groups. At the fourth tier is the Lebanese Fourth Division, a league of five parallel divisions each split into further groups. Finally, at the end of the pyramid is the Lebanese Fifth Division, also composed of five divisions split into further groups. The five divisions of both the Fourth and Fifth Division are named "Beirut", "Mount Lebanon", "North Lebanon", "South Lebanon" and "Beqaa".

Level	Divisions (as of 2022–23)				
1	Lebanese Premier League (One national division, 12 clubs)				
2	Lebanese Second Division (One national division, 12 clubs)				
3	Lebanese Third Division (4 groups, 5–6 clubs per group)				
4	Lebanese Fourth Division; Beirut (1 group, 9 clubs)	Lebanese Fourth Division; Mount Lebanon (5 groups, 7 clubs per group)	Lebanese Fourth Division; North (4 groups, 7–8 clubs per group)	Lebanese Fourth Division; South (3 groups, 7–8 clubs per group)	Lebanese Fourth Division; Beqaa (2 groups, 7 clubs per group)
5	Lebanese Fifth Division; Beirut (1 group, 8 clubs)	Lebanese Fifth Division; Mount Lebanon (2 groups, 7 clubs per group)	Lebanese Fifth Division; North (2 groups, 4–5 clubs per group)	Lebanese Fifth Division; South (2 groups, 7–8 clubs per group)	Lebanese Fifth Division; Beqaa (2 groups, 5–6 clubs per group)

If teams are level on points, tie-breakers are applied in the following order:

1. Head-to-head points;
2. Goal difference;
3. Goals scored;
4. Decisive match; in case of a draw, a penalty-shootout determines the winner.

=== Women ===
The women's system is divided into only one level.

Level	Divisions (as of 2022–23)
1	Lebanese Women's Football League (One national division, 8 clubs)

== See also ==
- League system, for a list of similar systems in other countries
- List of association football competitions
- Football in Lebanon
- List of football clubs in Lebanon
- List of top-division football clubs in AFC countries
