= 2019–20 Lebanese Premier League =

Lebanese Premier League 2019-2020

Lebanese Premier League
- Season: 2019–20
- Dates: 20 September 2019 – 17 October 2019
- Champions: None

The 2019–20 Lebanese Premier League, officially known as the Alfa Lebanese Football League (Arabic: دوري ألفا اللبناني لكرة القدم) for sponsorship reasons, was intended to be the 59th season of the Lebanese Premier League, the top Lebanese professional league for association football clubs, since its establishment in 1934.

Ahed were the three-time defending champions. Bourj and Shabab Bourj joined as the promoted clubs from the 2018–19 Lebanese Premier League. They replaced Bekaa and Racing, who were relegated to the 2019–20 Lebanese Second Division.

On 21 January 2020, the LFA decided to suspend all football leagues until further notice, and cancelled the three match days that were previously played (the last one being on 17 October 2019), due to the ongoing economic crisis and the impending arrival of the coronavirus pandemic. The season was officially cancelled on 28 May 2020.

== Summary ==
Starting from the 2019–20 season, all teams in the Lebanese Premier League and Lebanese Second Division had to involve a certain number of under-22 players in both the league and the Lebanese FA Cup, with a minimum of 1,000 minutes for one player, a minimum of 1,500 aggregate minutes for two players and a minimum of 2,000 aggregate minutes for three players. In case a club were to not meet the required number of minutes at the end of the season, they would have had three points deducted from their total in the league.

On 30 July 2019, the Lebanese Football Association announced a three-year deal with German sportswear company Jako for €120,000, with the Jako Match 2.0 becoming the league's official match ball starting from the 2019–20 season.

Due to political and financial issues in the country, the LFA decided to suspend all football leagues until further notice on 21 January 2020, and cancelled the three match days that were previously played (the last one being on 17 October 2019). With the COVID-19 pandemic also stopping sporting activities globally, the season was officially cancelled on 28 May 2020.

== Teams ==
Twelve teams were due to compete in the league – the top ten teams from the previous season and the two teams promoted from the Second Division. The promoted teams were Bourj (returning to the top flight after a 16-year absence) and Shabab Bourj (promoted for the first time in their history). They replaced Bekaa and Racing, ending their top flight spells of five and eleven years respectively.

=== Stadiums and locations ===
Locations of the 2019–20 Lebanese Premier League teams
Beirut Lebanese Premier League clubs

Prior to the start of each season, every team chooses two stadiums as their home venues. In case both stadiums are unavailable for a certain matchday, another venue is used.

Note: Table lists in alphabetical order.

Team	Location	Stadium	Capacity
Ahed	Beirut (Ouzai)	Ahed Stadium (Note: Only used as a training ground.)	2,000
Akhaa Ahli Aley	Aley	Amin Abdelnour Stadium	3,500
Ansar	Beirut (Tariq El Jdideh)	Ansar Stadium	—N/a
Bourj	Beirut (Bourj el-Barajneh)	Bourj el-Barajneh Stadium	1,500
Chabab Ghazieh	Ghazieh	Kfarjoz Stadium	2,000
Nejmeh	Beirut (Ras Beirut)	Rafic El-Hariri Stadium	5,000
Safa	Beirut (Wata El-Museitbeh)	Safa Stadium	4,000
Salam Zgharta	Zgharta	Zgharta Sports Complex	5,000
Shabab Bourj	Beirut (Bourj el-Barajneh)	Bourj el-Barajneh Stadium	1,500
Shabab Sahel	Beirut (Haret Hreik)	Shabab Al Sahel Stadium	—N/a
Tadamon Sour	Tyre	Sour Municipal Stadium	6,500
Tripoli	Tripoli	Tripoli Municipal Stadium	22,000

=== Personnel and kits ===
Team	Manager	Captain	Kit manufacturer	Shirt sponsor(s)
Ahed	(Lebanon) Bassem Marmar	(Lebanon) Haytham Faour	14Fourteen	ORCA Limited
Akhaa Ahli Aley	(Iraq) Abdul-Wahab Abu Al-Hail	(Palestine) Mohamad Abou Atik	Jako	—N/a
Ansar	(Syria) Nizar Mahrous	(Lebanon) Mootaz El Jounaidi	14Fourteen	Green Glory
Bourj	(Lebanon) Mohamad Dakka	(Lebanon) Walid Ismail	Jako	Hareb Chiken / Home Depot of Lebanon
Chabab Ghazieh	(Lebanon) Hassan Hassoun	(Lebanon) Ali Leila	P4	—N/a
Nejmeh	(Egypt) Mohamed Abdel Azim	(Lebanon) Ali Hamam	Capelli Sport	alfa / Nexen Tire
Safa	(Germany) Robert Jaspert	(Lebanon) Mohamed Zein Tahan	Jako	—N/a
Salam Zgharta	(Iraq) Ahmed Kadhim	(Lebanon) Jean Jaques Yammine	Capelli Sport	SGBL
Shabab Bourj	(Lebanon) Ibrahim Itani	(Lebanon) Alaa Hamieh	14Fourteen	Al Aman Trust Insurance / Lancaster Hotels & Suites
Shabab Sahel	(Lebanon) Mahmoud Hammoud	(Lebanon) Zoheir Abdallah	Jako	XGLOBAL Markets / Sahel General Hospital
Tadamon Sour	(Lebanon) Mohamad Zoheir	(Lebanon) Bilal Hajjo	14Fourteen	Credit Libanais
Tripoli	(Egypt) Ahmad Hafez	(Lebanon) Ahmad Moghrabi	Joma	Azm & Saade Association

=== Foreign players ===
Lebanese clubs are allowed to have three foreign players at their disposal at any time, as well as one extra Palestinian player born in Lebanon. Moreover, each club competing in an AFC competition is allowed to field one extra foreign player, to be only played in continental matches, as the AFC allows four foreign players to play in the starting eleven (one of whom from an AFC country).

- Players in **bold** have been registered during the mid-season transfer window.
- Players in italics have left the club during the mid-season transfer window,.

Team	Player 1	Player 2	Player 3	Palestinian player	AFC Cup player	Former players
Ahed	(Syria) Ahmad Al Salih	(Ghana) Issah Yakubu	(Tunisia) Ahmed Akaïchi			—
Akhaa Ahli Aley	(Portugal) Carlos Lomba	(Brazil) Carlos Alberto	(Zambia) Christopher Munthali	(Palestine) Mohamad Abou Atik	—	—
Ansar	(Senegal) El Hadji Malick Tall	(Tunisia) Houssem Louati	(Guinea) Aboubacar Leo Camara			—
Bourj	(Ghana) Stephen Sarfo	(Ghana) Malik Ismaila Antiri	(Brazil) Thiago Amaral	(Palestine) Mohammed Qasem	—	—
Chabab Ghazieh	(Ghana) Stephen Essaw	(Ghana) Kennedy Koranteng	(Ghana) Ernest Barfo		—	—
Nejmeh	(Senegal) Idrissa Niang	(Tunisia) Mourad Hedhli	(Ghana) Issaka Abudu Diarra		—	—
Safa	(Senegal) Fallou Sarr	(Senegal) El Hadji Abdou Karim Samb	(Senegal) Daouda Diop		—	—
Salam Zgharta	(Brazil) Vinícius Calamari	(Ghana) Cosmos Dauda	(Senegal) Mostafa Sall	(Palestine) Ali Hamam	—	—
Shabab Bourj	(Ivory Coast) Lorougnon Christ Remi	(Ghana) Sadick Adams	(Portugal) Agostinho Cá		—	—
Shabab Sahel	(Senegal) Bakary Coulibaly	(Senegal) Abdou Aziz Ndiaye	(Senegal) Daouda Guèye Diémé		—	—
Tadamon Sour	(Ghana) Kofi Yeboah	(Ghana) Abdul Basit	(Nigeria) Musa Kabiru		—	—
Tripoli	(Senegal) Mamadou Sylla	(Burkina Faso) Issouf Ouattara	(Syria) Hael Al Badri	(Palestine) Ahmad Yassine	—	—

== League table at abandonment ==
Pos	Team	Pld	W	D	L	GF	GA	GD	Pts	Qualification or relegation
1	Ansar	3	2	0	1	7	3	+4	6	Qualification for AFC Cup group stage
2	Bourj	2	2	0	0	3	0	+3	6	
3	Nejmeh	2	2	0	0	3	1	+2	6	
4	Shabab Sahel	3	1	1	1	4	4	0	4	
5	Akhaa Ahli Aley	3	1	1	1	3	3	0	4	
6	Safa	3	1	1	1	3	4	−1	4	
7	Ahed	1	1	0	0	3	1	+2	3	
8	Salam Zgharta	2	1	0	1	2	2	0	3	
9	Tripoli	2	1	0	1	2	3	−1	3	
10	Shabab Bourj	3	1	0	2	3	5	−2	3	
11	Tadamon Sour	3	0	1	2	2	4	−2	1	Relegation to Lebanese Second Division
12	Chabab Ghazieh	3	0	0	3	2	7	−5	0	Relegation to Lebanese Second Division

Source: RSSSF
Rules for classification: 1) Points; 2) Head-to-head points; 3) Head-to-head goal difference; 4) Goal difference; 5) Goals scored; 6) Draw.
