= 2019–20 Lebanese FA Cup =

Tournament details
- Country: Lebanon
- Dates: 12 October 2019
- Teams: 26

Final positions
- Champions: None

Tournament statistics
- Matches played: 7
- Goals scored: 30 (4.29 per match)

The 2019–20 Lebanese FA Cup was intended to be the 48th edition of the national football cup competition of Lebanon. It started with the First round on 12 October 2019. Lebanese Premier League side Ahed were the defending champions.

The Lebanese Football Association suspended all competitions on 21 January 2020 due to the political and financial situation in Lebanon; this resulted in the indefinite suspension of all football matches in Lebanon. With the COVID-19 pandemic also stopping sporting activities nationwide, the 2019–20 season was officially cancelled on 28 May 2020.

== Teams ==
Phase	Round	Clubs remaining	Clubs involved	Winners from previous round	New entries this round	Leagues entering at this round
First phase	First round	26	14	none	14	12 Second Division teams 2 Third Division teams
First phase	Second round	19	6	6	none	none
Second phase	Round of 16	16	16	3 (Note: Ahli Saida from the first round received a bye to the round of 16.)	12	12 Lebanese Premier League teams
Second phase	Quarter-finals	8	8	8	none	none
Second phase	Semi-finals	4	4	4	none	none
Second phase	Final	2	2	2	none	none

== First phase ==
=== First round ===
12 October 2019 Match 1	Irshad Chehim (3)	1–4	Mabarra (2)
		Report

12 October 2019 Match 2	Amal Salam Zgharta (3)	1–3	Sporting (2)
		Report

12 October 2019 Match 3	Racing Beirut (2)	8–0	Bekaa (2)
		Report

12 October 2019 Match 4	Nahda Barelias (2)	1–2	Ahli Nabatieh (2)
		Report

12 October 2019 Match 5	Ansar Howara (2)	2–2 (a.e.t.) (5–3 p)	Egtmaaey (2)
		Report

12 October 2019 Match 6	Sagesse (2)	2–0	Nasser Bar Elias (2)
		Report

12 October 2019 Match 7	Islah Borj Shmali (2)	1–3	Ahli Saida (2)
		Report

=== Second round ===
17 November 2019 Match 8	Mabarra (2)	v	Sporting (2)

17 November 2019 Match 9	Racing Beirut (2)	v	Ahli Nabatieh (2)

17 November 2019 Match 10	Ansar Howara (2)	v	Sagesse (2)

== Second phase ==
=== Round of 16 ===
21 December 2019 Match 11	Ahli Saida (2)	v	Tripoli (1)

21 December 2019 Match 12	Winner match 8	v	Tadamon Sour (1)

21 December 2019 Match 13	Winner match 9	v	Ansar (1)

21 December 2019 Match 14	Winner match 10	v	Nejmeh (1)

21 December 2019 Match 15	Akhaa Ahli (1)	v	Shabab Bourj (1)

21 December 2019 Match 16	Shabab Sahel (1)	v	Salam Zgharta (1)

21 December 2019 Match 17	Bourj (1)	v	Ahed (1)

21 December 2019 Match 18	Safa (1)	v	Chabab Ghazieh (1)

=== Quarter-finals ===
Match 19	Winner match 11	v	Winner match 12

Match 20	Winner match 13	v	Winner match 14

Match 21	Winner match 15	v	Winner match 16

Match 22	Winner match 17	v	Winner match 18

=== Semi-finals ===
Match 23	Winner match 19	v	Winner match 20

Match 24	Winner match 21	v	Winner match 22

=== Final ===
Match 25

Winner match 23	v	Winner match 24

== Bracket ==
The following is the bracket which the Lebanese FA Cup resembled. Numbers in parentheses next to the score represents the results of a penalty shoot-out.

Round of 16; 21 December 2019
Ahli Saida
Tripoli
Winner match 8
Tadamon Sour
Winner match 9
Ansar
Winner match 10
Nejmeh
Akhaa Ahli
Shabab Bourj
Shabab Sahel
Salam Zgharta
Bourj
Ahed
Safa
Chabab Ghazieh

Quarter-finals
Winner match 11
Winner match 12
Winner match 13
Winner match 14
Winner match 15
Winner match 16
Winner match 17
Winner match 18

Semi-finals
Winner match 19
Winner match 20
Winner match 21
Winner match 22

Final
Winner match 23
Winner match 24
