= Sami El Choum =

Lebanese football player and manager

Personal information
- Full name: Sami Ali El Choum
- Date of birth: 22 June 1982 (age 44)
- Place of birth: Jeddah, Saudi Arabia
- Height: 1.78 m (5 ft 10 in)
- Positions: Defensive midfielder; centre-back

Team information
- Current team: Ansar (head coach)

Youth career
- 1997–2002: Ansar

Senior career*
Years	Team	Apps	(Gls)
2002–2013	Ansar		
2015	Homenetmen		

International career
2003	Lebanon	4	(0)

Managerial career
- 2017: Ansar
- 2017–2018: Ansar
- 2018–2021: Sporting
- 2022–2023: Sporting
- 2023–2026: Ansar (assistant)
- 2026–: Ansar
- * Club domestic league appearances and goals

Sami Ali El Choum (Arabic: سامي علي الشوم; born 22 June 1982) is a football coach and former player who is the head coach of Lebanese Premier League club Ansar. Born in Saudi Arabia, El Choum played for the Lebanon national team.

A defensive midfielder for Lebanese Premier League side Ansar, El Choum remained at the Beirut-based club for over 10 years, winning multiple titles. He played for Homenetmen in the Lebanese Second Division in 2015.

Between 2017 and 2018 El Choum coached Ansar, winning the 2016–17 Lebanese FA Cup, before becoming coach of Third Division side Sporting in 2018, leading them to back-to-back promotions to the Premier League. He returned to Ansar in 2023 as assistant coach.

== Club career ==
El Choum signed for Ansar's youth side on 31 October 1997. He debuted in the Lebanese Premier League during the 2002–03 season. During his time at Ansar, El Choum won two league titles (2005–06, 2006–07), for Lebanese FA Cups (2005–06, 2006–07, 2009–10, 2011–12), and one Lebanese Super Cup (2012). In 2015 El Choum played for Lebanese Second Division side Homenetmen.

== International career ==
On 23 August 2003 El Choum made his senior international debut for Lebanon, in a friendly against Syria; Lebanon won 1–0. He played a total of four games for his country, all in 2003.

== Managerial career ==
=== Ansar ===
Initially a coach for Ansar's youth sides since 2013, El Choum became the assistant coach of Zoran Pešić, Ansar's first team coach. El Choum became Ansar's coach on 5 February 2017, helping them lift the 2016–17 Lebanese FA Cup. In 2017 El Choum became Ansar's assistant coach, before being re-called as temporary head coach on 27 November 2017, during the 2017–18 season. On 16 January 2018 El Choum resigned from his coaching position.

=== Sporting ===
El Choum was appointed head coach of Sporting in the Lebanese Third Division, ahead of the 2018–19 season. He helped them win the league, and returned to the Lebanese Second Division after five years. The following season, in 2020–21, he led the team to win the Second Division, and qualify to the Lebanese Premier League for the first time in their history.

=== Return to Ansar ===
In August 2023, El Choum returned to Ansar as assistant coach.

== Personal life ==
El Chom has two younger brothers, Ahmad and Kassem, who have also played football.

== Honours ==
=== Player ===
Ansar

- Lebanese Premier League: 2005–06, 2006–07
- Lebanese FA Cup: 2005–06, 2006–07, 2009–10, 2011–12
- Lebanese Super Cup: 2012

=== Manager ===
Ansar

- Lebanese Premier League: 2025–26
- Lebanese FA Cup: 2016–17

Sporting

- Lebanese Second Division: 2020–21
- Lebanese Third Division: 2018–19

=== Assistant manager ===
Ansar

- Lebanese Premier League: 2020–21, 2024–25
- Lebanese FA Cup: 2023–24

== See also ==
- List of Lebanese people in Saudi Arabia
- List of Lebanon international footballers born outside Lebanon
- List of association football families
