= Yahya El Hindi =

Association football player (born 1998)

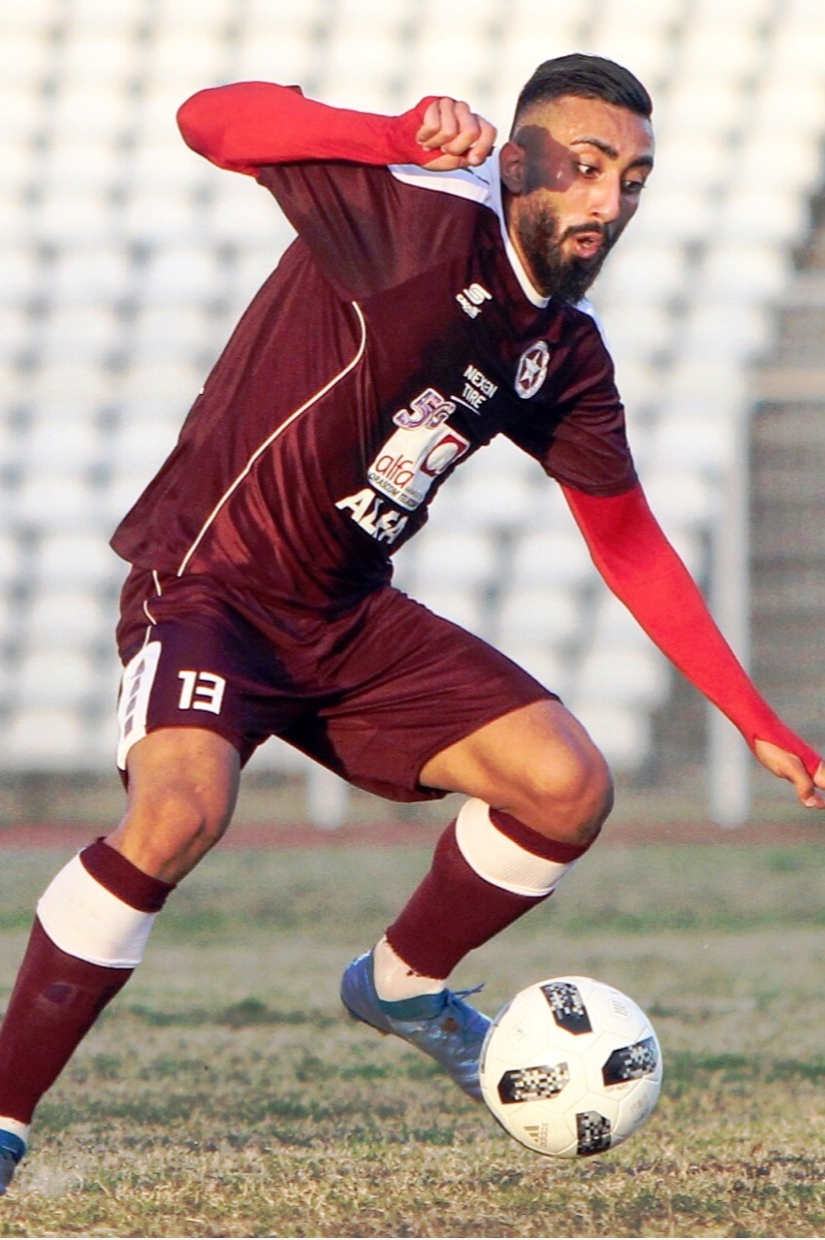
- El Hindi with Nejmeh in 2019

Personal information
- Full name: Yahya Mosbah El Hindi
- Date of birth: 24 September 1998 (age 28)
- Place of birth: Sydney, New South Wales, Australia
- Height: 1.85 m (6 ft 1 in)
- Position: Defensive midfielder

Youth career
- 2014: Fraser Park
- 2015: Rydalmere Lions
- 2016: Rockdale City Suns
- 2017–2018: Sydney Olympic

Senior career*
Years	Team	Apps	(Gls)
2017–2018	Sydney Olympic	1	(0)
2018	Parramatta	10	(0)
2019	Nejmeh	6	(0)
2019–2020	Safa	3	(0)
2020–2021	Budaiya	16	(0)
2021–2024	Ansar	30	(0)
2025	Wests APIA FC	0	(0)
2026	Tripoli	3	(0)

International career^{‡}
2019	Lebanon U23	1	(0)
2019–2023	Lebanon	4	(0)
- * Club domestic league appearances and goals as of 22 February 2026 ‡ National team caps and goals as of 31 December 2023

Yahya Mosbah El Hindi (/ˈjɑːjɑː ɛl ˈhindi/; Arabic: يحيى مصباح الهندي, Lebanese Arabic pronunciation: [ˈjaħja lˈhɪnde, -di]; born 24 September 1998) is a professional footballer who plays as a defensive midfielder. Born in Australia, El Hindi has played for the Lebanon national team.

El Hindi began his senior career at Sydney Olympic in 2017, before moving to Parramatta mid-2018 season. In 2019 he moved to the Middle East, playing for Nejmeh and Safa, in Lebanon, before joining Budaiya in Bahrain in 2020. El Hindi returned to Lebanon in 2021, playing for Ansar until 2024. After a brief spell in Australia at Wests APIA FC, he returned to Lebanon in 2026 to play for Tripoli.

== Early life ==
Australian at birth, El Hindi also holds Lebanese citizenship due to his origins. He was born in Sydney, Australia and raised in the suburb of Bankstown. His parents are from Tripoli, Lebanon.

== Club career ==
El Hindi began his youth career at Fraser Park in 2014, before signing for Rydalmere Lions the following year. After playing for Rockdale City Suns' youth team in 2016, El Hindi moved to Sydney Olympic in 2017. Mid-season in 2018 he moved to Parramatta, where he played 10 games in the 2018 NPL NSW 2.

On 4 January 2019, El Hindi signed for Lebanese Premier League club Nejmeh. His debut for the club came on 26 January 2019, as a starter in a 2–0 league win over Racing Beirut. He played six league games during the 2018–19 season, as well as four games at the 2019 AFC Cup. Safa signed El Hindi during the 2019 summer transfer window. Due to political unrest in the country, the 2019–20 season was cancelled, and El Hindi was forced to return to Australia.

On 28 November 2020, El Hindi moved to newly promoted Bahraini Premier League side Budaiya. He played 16 league games in 2020–21, and helped his side avoid relegation by finishing in seventh place.

In November 2021, El Hindi underwent a trial with German club Schalke 04, having trained with the club for several weeks. He was reportedly considered for a transfer, but no move materialised. On 16 December 2021, El Hindi signed for Ansar in the Lebanese Premier League. He renewed with Ansar for an additional season in June 2022, and for one more year in May 2023.

On 27 September 2025, El Hindi returned to Australia and signed for Wests APIA FC ahead of the 2025 Australian Championship. On 17 January 2026, El Hindi moved to Lebanese Second Division side Tripoli for the 2025–26 season.

== International career ==
El Hindi represented the Lebanon national under-23 team during the 2020 AFC U-23 Championship qualification, playing once against the United Arab Emirates in a 6–1 defeat in March 2019.

He made his debut for the senior team on 30 July 2019, in a 1–0 defeat against Iraq at the 2019 WAFF Championship. El Hindi became the third Australian to play for Lebanon, after Michael Reda and Buddy Farah. Despite the defeat, he was nominated Man of the Match. In December 2023, El Hindi was included in the Lebanese squad for the 2023 AFC Asian Cup.

== Career statistics ==
=== Club ===
As of match played 22 February 2026

Appearances and goals by club, season and competition
Club	Season	League			National cup (Note: Includes Australia Cup, Lebanese FA Cup, Bahraini FA Cup)		League cup (Note: Includes Lebanese Federation Cup)		Continental		Other		Total	
Club	Season	Division	Apps	Goals	Apps	Goals	Apps	Goals	Apps	Goals	Apps	Goals	Apps	Goals
Sydney Olympic	2017	NPL NSW 1	1	0	—		—		—		—		1	0
Sydney Olympic	2018	NPL NSW 1	0	0	—		—		—		—		0	0
Sydney Olympic	Total		1	0	0	0	0	0	0	0	0	0	1	0
Parramatta	2018	NPL NSW 2	10	0	—		—		—		—		10	0
Nejmeh	2018–19	Lebanese Premier League	6	0	—		—		4 (Note: Appearance(s) in AFC Cup)	0	—		10	0
Safa	2019–20	Lebanese Premier League	3	0	—		—		—		—		3	0
Budaiya	2020–21	Bahraini Premier League	16	0	1	0	—		—		—		17	0
Ansar	2021–22	Lebanese Premier League	2	0	1	0	—		1	0	—		4	0
Ansar	2022–23	Lebanese Premier League	15	0	0	0	—		—		—		15	0
Ansar	2023–24	Lebanese Premier League	13	0	1	0	2	0	—		—		16	0
Ansar	Total		30	0	2	0	2	0	1	0	0	0	35	0
Wests APIA FC	2025	—			—		—		—		4 (Note: Appearances in Australian Championship)	0	4	0
Tripoli	2025–26	Lebanese Second Division	3	0	—		—		—		—		3	0
Career total			69	0	3	0	2	0	5	0	4	0	83	0

=== International ===
As of match played 28 December 2023

Appearances and goals by national team and year
National team	Year	Apps	Goals
Lebanon	2019	2	0
Lebanon	2020	0	0
Lebanon	2021	0	0
Lebanon	2022	0	0
Lebanon	2023	2	0
Total		4	0

== Honours ==
Ansar

- Lebanese FA Cup: 2023–24; runner-up: 2021–22

== See also ==
- List of Lebanon international footballers born outside Lebanon
