= Hussein Ibrahim =

Lebanese footballer (born 1993)

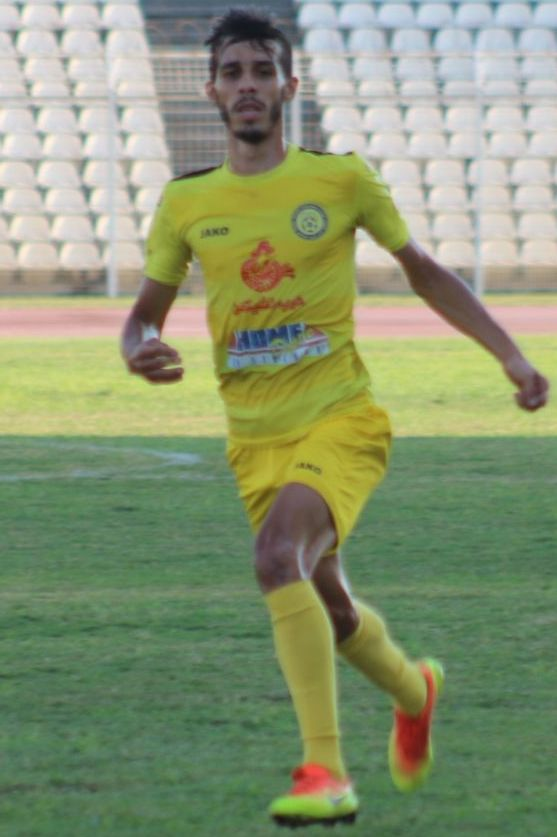
- Ibrahim with Bourj in 2020

Personal information
- Full name: Hussein Khodor Ibrahim
- Date of birth: 13 March 1993 (age 33)
- Place of birth: Bourj el-Barajneh, Lebanon
- Height: 1.70 m (5 ft 7 in)
- Position: Forward

Team information
- Current team: Mabarra

Senior career*
Years	Team	Apps	(Gls)
2011–2018	Ansar	45	(0)
2018–2024	Bourj	46	(0)
2024–2026	Mabarra	38	(2)
2026–	Shabab Sahel	0	(0)

International career
2014	Lebanon	2	(0)
- * Club domestic league appearances and goals as of 13 September 2026

Hussein Khodor Ibrahim (Arabic: حسين خضر ابراهيم; born 13 March 1993) is a Lebanese footballer who plays as a midfielder for Lebanese Premier League club Shabab Sahel.

== Honours ==
Ansar

- Lebanese FA Cup: 2011–12, 2016–17
- Lebanese Super Cup: 2012; runner-up: 2017
- Lebanese Elite Cup runner-up: 2016

Bourj

- Lebanese Challenge Cup: 2019
- Lebanese Second Division: 2018–19
