= Mahdi Fahs =

Lebanese footballer (born 1994)

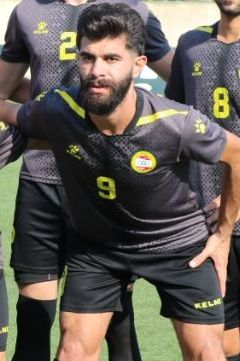
- Fahs with Ahed in 2020

Personal information
- Full name: Mahdi Hassan Fahs
- Date of birth: 13 October 1994 (age 32)
- Place of birth: Nabatieh, Lebanon
- Height: 1.83 m (6 ft 0 in)
- Position: Midfielder

Team information
- Current team: Riyadi Abbasiyah
- Number: 10

Senior career*
Years	Team	Apps	(Gls)
2012–2024	Ahed	93	(6)
2022–2023	→ Sagesse (loan)	10	(0)
2024	→ Safa (loan)	14	(0)
2024–2025	Safa	15	(0)
2025	Nejmeh	4	(0)
2025–	Riyadi Abbasiyah	21	(1)

International career
2013	Lebanon U20		
2012–2015	Lebanon U23	4	(0)
2014	Lebanon	3	(0)
- * Club domestic league appearances and goals as of 29 July 2026

Mahdi Hassan Fahs (Arabic: مهدي حسن فحص; born 13 October 1994) is a Lebanese footballer who plays as a midfielder for Lebanese Premier League club Riyadi Abbasiyah.

== Club career ==
=== Ahed ===
Fahs began his senior debut at Lebanese Premier League side Ahed aged 18, during the 2012–13 season. In his first season at the club, Fahs played six league games, scoring one goal in the process. Fahs won his first title with Ahed during the 2013–14 season, helping his side life the 2013 Lebanese Elite Cup. The following season, in 2014–15, Fahs won his first league title, scoring two league goals in 16 games.

Fahs continued to help Ahed win domestically, lifting both the 2015 Lebanese Elite Cup, and the 2015 Lebanese Super Cup. During the 2015–16 season, Fahs scored two goals in 11 league games. In 2016–17, Fahs won his second league title with his club, playing 18 games in the league. Due to his performances that season, Fahs was included in the 2016–17 Lebanese Premier League Team of the Season.

In 2017–18 Ahed won three competitions: a league title, a Lebanese FA Cup, and a Lebanese Super Cup. During the 2017–18 season, Fahs played 16 league games, and helped Ahed win both a league title and a Super Cup. At the start of the 2018–19 season, he sustained a cruciate ligament injury, remaining unavailable for seven months. Fahs finished the season with two league games, and won both the league and FA Cup.

In August 2019, he was injured in his other foot's cruciate ligament, for six months. On 26 March 2021, midway through the 2020–21 season, Fahs sustained his third ACL injury, during a friendly game against Shabab Bourj. He returned to training in September 2022.

==== Loan to Sagesse ====
In December 2022, Fahs joined Sagesse ahead of the second half of the 2022–23 Lebanese Premier League. He helped Sagesse secure their spot in the league.

=== Safa ===
Ahead of the second half of the 2023–24 Lebanese Premier League, Fahs was loaned to Safa and reunited with his former manager from Ahed Bassem Marmar. After the end of the loan spell, Fahs permanently moved to Safa.

=== Nejmeh ===
In April 2024, Fahs joined Nejmeh.

=== Riyadi Abbasiyah ===
In August 2025, Fahs joined Riyadi Abbasiyah. In September 2026, his contract was renewed for a further season.

== International career ==
Fahs was called up to the Lebanon national under-20 team for the 2013 Jeux de la Francophonie.

He was first called up to the Lebanon national team in October 2014, as part of a mixed squad of senior and Olympic players for friendly matches against Qatar and Saudi Arabia. His senior debut came on 9 October 2014, against Qatar; Lebanon lost the encounter 5–0.

== Honours ==
Ahed

- AFC Cup: 2019
- Lebanese Premier League: 2014–15, 2016–17, 2017–18, 2018–19, 2021–22
- Lebanese FA Cup: 2017–18, 2018–19
- Lebanese Federation Cup: 2023
- Lebanese Elite Cup: 2013, 2015; runner-up: 2021
- Lebanese Super Cup: 2015, 2017, 2018, 2019

Individual

- Lebanese Premier League Team of the Season: 2016–17
