= 2019–20 Lebanese Second Division =

Lebanese Second Division
- Season: 2019–20
- Dates: 20 September 2019 – 2020
- Matches: 18
- Goals: 56 (3.11 per match)

The Lebanese Second Division (Arabic: الدوري اللبناني - الدرجة الثانية) is the second division of Lebanese football. It is controlled by the Lebanese Football Association. The top two teams qualify for the Lebanese Premier League and replace the relegated teams, while the bottom two are relegated to the Lebanese Third Division.

Sporting and Ansar Howara were promoted from the Third Division, while Bekaa and Racing Beirut were relegated from the Lebanese Premier League in 2018–19.

On 21 January 2020, the LFA decided to suspend all football leagues until further notice, and cancelled the three match days that were previously played (the last one being on 17 October 2019). The season was officially cancelled on 28 May 2020.

== Teams ==
Team	Home city	Stadium	Capacity	2018–19 season
Ahli Nabatieh	Nabatieh	Kfarjoz Stadium		6th in the Lebanese Second Division
Ahli Saida	Sidon	Saida Municipal Stadium	22,000	3rd in the Lebanese Second Division
Ansar Howara	Zgharta	Various		2nd in the Lebanese Third Division
Bekaa	Al-Nabi Shayth	Nabi Chit Stadium	5,000	12th in the Lebanese Premier League
Egtmaaey	Tripoli	International Olympic Stadium	25,000	5th in the Lebanese Second Division
Islah Borj Shmali	Tyre	Sour Stadium	6,500	9th in the Lebanese Second Division
Mabarra	Beirut	Ahed Stadium	2,000	10th in the Lebanese Second Division
Nahda Barelias	Barelias	Jamal Abdel Nasser Stadium		7th in the Lebanese Second Division
Nasser Club Bar Elias	Barelias	Jamal Abdel Nasser Stadium		8th in the Lebanese Second Division
Racing Beirut	Beirut	Fouad Chehab Stadium	5,000	11th in the Lebanese Premier League
Sagesse	Beirut	Safa Stadium	4,000	4th in the Lebanese Second Division
Sporting	Beirut	Safa Stadium	4,000	1st in the Lebanese Third Division

== League table prior to the suspension ==
Pos	Team	Pld	W	D	L	GF	GA	GD	Pts	Promotion or relegation
1	Sagesse	3	3	0	0	9	3	+6	9	Promotion to Lebanese Premier League
2	Sporting	3	2	0	1	7	4	+3	6	Promotion to Lebanese Premier League
3	Egtmaaey	3	2	0	1	7	5	+2	6	
4	Ahli Saida	3	2	0	1	7	6	+1	6	
5	Mabarra	3	1	1	1	4	4	0	4	
6	Nahda Barelias	3	1	1	1	3	3	0	4	
7	Bekaa	3	1	1	1	5	6	−1	4	
8	Racing Beirut	3	1	0	2	3	4	−1	3	
9	Ansar Howara	3	1	0	2	4	7	−3	3	
10	Islah Borj Shmali	3	0	2	1	2	3	−1	2	
11	Ahli Nabatieh	3	0	2	1	1	3	−2	2	Relegation to Lebanese Third Division
12	Nasser Bar Elias	3	0	1	2	4	8	−4	1	Relegation to Lebanese Third Division

Updated to match(es) played on 6 October 2019. Source: Goalzz
Rules for classification: 1) Points; 2) Head-to-head points; 3) Head-to-head goal difference; 4) Goal difference; 5) Goals scored; 6) Draw.
