= 2019–20 in Lebanese football =

Football in Lebanon
- Season: 2019–20

Men's football
- Elite Cup: Shabab Sahel
- Challenge Cup: Bourj
- Lebanese Super Cup: Ahed

Women's football
- Football League: SAS

The 2019–20 season was the 87th season of competitive football in Lebanon. Due to political and financial issues in the country, on 21 January 2020, the LFA decided to suspend all football leagues until further notice, and cancelled the three match days that were previously played (the last one being on 17 October 2019). With the COVID-19 pandemic also stopping sporting activities globally, the season was officially cancelled on 28 May 2020.

== National teams ==
=== Lebanon national football team ===
==== Kits ====
Home	Away

==== Results and fixtures ====
===== Friendlies =====
10 September 2019 Friendly	Oman	1–0	Lebanon	Seeb, Oman
19:30 UTC+4	Al-Ghassani 55'; Al-Rawahi (red card) 68'	Report	Ataya (yellow card) 80'; Mansour (yellow card) 89'	Stadium: Al-Seeb Stadium; Referee: Ali Shaban (Kuwait)

===== 2019 WAFF Championship =====
====== Group A ======
Pos	Team	Pld	W	D	L	GF	GA	GD	Pts	Qualification
1	Iraq (H)	4	3	1	0	5	2	+3	10	Advances to final
2	Palestine	4	2	1	1	6	5	+1	7	
3	Yemen	4	1	1	2	4	5	−1	4	
4	Lebanon	4	1	1	2	3	4	−1	4	
5	Syria	4	0	2	2	5	7	−2	2	

Source: Goalzz
(H) Hosts

30 July 2019 2019 WAFF Championship GS	Iraq	1–0	Lebanon	Karbala, Iraq
19:30 UTC+3	Ali 58'	Report		Stadium: Karbala Sports City; Attendance: 25,125; Referee: Ali Abdulnabi (Bahrain)

2 August 2019 2019 WAFF Championship GS	Lebanon	2–1	Syria	Karbala, Iraq
22:30 UTC+3	Matar 81'; Moni 90+1'	Report	Al Douni 48'	Stadium: Karbala Sports City; Attendance: 500; Referee: Mohammad Arafah (Jordan)

5 August 2019 2019 WAFF Championship GS	Lebanon	0–0	Palestine	Karbala, Iraq
22:30 UTC+3		Report		Stadium: Karbala Sports City; Attendance: 500; Referee: Saad Khalefah (Kuwait)

8 August 2019 2019 WAFF Championship GS	Yemen	2–1	Lebanon	Karbala, Iraq
19:30 UTC+3	Mansoor 43'; Al-Matari 45+1' (pen.)	Report	Kdouh 26'	Stadium: Karbala Sports City; Attendance: 10,000; Referee: Ali Abdulnabi (Bahrain)

===== 2022 FIFA World Cup qualification =====
====== Second round: Group H ======
Pos	Team	Pld	W	D	L	GF	GA	GD	Pts	Qualification	South Korea	Lebanon	Turkmenistan	Sri Lanka	North Korea
1	South Korea	6	5	1	0	22	1	+21	16	World Cup qualifying third round and Asian Cup	—	2–1	5–0	8–0	~~Canc.~~
2	Lebanon	6	3	1	2	11	8	+3	10	World Cup qualifying third round and Asian Cup	0–0	—	2–1	3–2	~~0–0~~
3	Turkmenistan	6	3	0	3	8	11	−3	9	Asian Cup qualifying third round	0–2	3–2	—	2–0	~~3–1~~
4	Sri Lanka	6	0	0	6	2	23	−21	0	Asian Cup qualifying third round	0–5	0–3	0–2	—	~~0–1~~
5	North Korea (Note: North Korea withdrew due to safety concerns related to the COVID-19 pandemic, therefore the results of their matches were excluded from the group standings.)	0	0	0	0	0	0	0	0	Withdrew	~~0–0~~	~~2–0~~	~~Canc.~~	~~Canc.~~	—

Source: FIFA
Rules for classification: Qualification tiebreakers
Notes:

5 September 2019 2019 World Cup qualification R2	North Korea	2–0	Lebanon	Pyongyang, North Korea
17:30 UTC+9	Jong Il-gwan 7', 56'; Kim Chol-bom (yellow card) 62'; Jang Kuk-chol (yellow card) 71'; Sim Hyon-jin (yellow card) 73'	Report (FIFA); Report (AFC)	Haidar (yellow card) 42'; El-Helwe (yellow card) 69'	Stadium: Kim Il-sung Stadium; Attendance: 40,000; Referee: Sherzod Kasimov (Uzbekistan)

10 October 2019 2019 World Cup qualification R2	Lebanon	2–1	Turkmenistan	Beirut, Lebanon
19:00 UTC+3	El-Helwe 5'; Aich (yellow card) 61'; Matar 64'; Haidar (yellow card) 67'	Report (FIFA); Report (AFC)	Annadurdyýew 62'	Stadium: Camille Chamoun Sports City Stadium; Attendance: 7,820; Referee: Takuto Okabe (Japan)

15 October 2019 2019 World Cup qualification R2	Sri Lanka	0–3	Lebanon	Colombo, Sri Lanka
19:30 UTC+5:30	Puslas (yellow card) 26'; Fernando (yellow card) 45'	Report (FIFA); Report (AFC)	Maatouk 15' (pen.); El-Helwe 38' (pen.), 81'	Stadium: Colombo Racecourse; Attendance: 1,052; Referee: Ammar Mahfoodh (Bahrain)

14 November 2019 2022 World Cup qualification R2	Lebanon	0–0	South Korea	Beirut, Lebanon
15:00 UTC+2	Haidar (yellow card) 43'	Report (FIFA); Report (AFC)	Hwang Hee-chan (yellow card) 63'	Stadium: Camille Chamoun Sports City Stadium; Attendance: 170 (Note: The Lebanon v South Korea and the Lebanon v North Korea matches were played behind closed door due to security reasons regarding the Lebanese protests.); Referee: Mohanad Qasim (Iraq)

19 November 2019 2022 World Cup qualification R2	Lebanon	0–0	North Korea	Beirut, Lebanon
19:00 UTC+2	A. Michel Melki (yellow card) 19'; Jradi (yellow card) 90+4'	Report (FIFA); Report (AFC)	Ri Kwang-il (yellow card) 63'; Jong Il-gwan (yellow card) 83'	Stadium: Camille Chamoun Sports City Stadium; Attendance: Referee: Yaqoob Abdul Baki (Oman)

== AFC competitions ==
=== AFC Cup ===
==== Group stage ====
===== Group A =====
Pos	Team	Pld	W	D	L	GF	GA	GD	Pts	JAI	MAN	AHE	HQU
1	(Syria) Al-Jaish	2	1	1	0	1	0	+1	4 (Note: 2019 AFC association ranking: Syria (Al-Jaish) 22nd, Bahrain (Manama) 27th.)	—	0–0	~~29 Oct~~	~~4 Nov~~
2	(Bahrain) Manama	2	1	1	0	1	0	+1	4	~~1 Nov~~	—	1–0	~~29 Oct~~
3	(Lebanon) Al-Ahed	2	1	0	1	2	2	0	3	~~26 Oct~~	~~4 Nov~~	—	2–1
4	(Palestine) Hilal Al-Quds	2	0	0	2	1	3	−2	0	0–1	~~26 Oct~~	~~1 Nov~~	—

Source: AFC

===== Group B =====
Pos	Team	Pld	W	D	L	GF	GA	GD	Pts	KWT	ANS	WAT	FAI
1	Al-Kuwait	2	1	1	0	1	0	+1	4	—	1–0	~~4 Nov~~	~~29 Oct~~
2	(Lebanon) Al-Ansar	2	1	0	1	4	4	0	3	~~1 Nov~~	—	~~29 Oct~~	4–3
3	(Syria) Al-Wathba	2	0	2	0	0	0	0	2	0–0	~~26 Oct~~	—	~~1 Nov~~
4	(Jordan) Al-Faisaly	2	0	1	1	3	4	−1	1	~~26 Oct~~	~~4 Nov~~	0–0	—

Source: AFC

== Men's football ==
League	Promoted to league	Relegated from league
Lebanese Premier League	Bourj; Shabab Bourj	Bekaa; Racing Beirut
Lebanese Second Division	AC Sporting; Ansar Howara	Shabab Arabi; Homenetmen

=== Lebanese Premier League ===
Pos	Team	Pld	W	D	L	GF	GA	GD	Pts	Qualification or relegation
1	Ansar	3	2	0	1	7	3	+4	6	Qualification for AFC Cup group stage
2	Bourj	2	2	0	0	3	0	+3	6	
3	Nejmeh	2	2	0	0	3	1	+2	6	
4	Shabab Sahel	3	1	1	1	4	4	0	4	
5	Akhaa Ahli Aley	3	1	1	1	3	3	0	4	
6	Safa	3	1	1	1	3	4	−1	4	
7	Ahed	1	1	0	0	3	1	+2	3	
8	Salam Zgharta	2	1	0	1	2	2	0	3	
9	Tripoli	2	1	0	1	2	3	−1	3	
10	Shabab Bourj	3	1	0	2	3	5	−2	3	
11	Tadamon Sour	3	0	1	2	2	4	−2	1	Relegation to Lebanese Second Division
12	Chabab Ghazieh	3	0	0	3	2	7	−5	0	Relegation to Lebanese Second Division

Source: RSSSF
Rules for classification: 1) Points; 2) Head-to-head points; 3) Head-to-head goal difference; 4) Goal difference; 5) Goals scored; 6) Draw.

=== Lebanese Second Division ===
Pos	Team	Pld	W	D	L	GF	GA	GD	Pts	Promotion or relegation
1	Sagesse	3	3	0	0	9	3	+6	9	Promotion to Lebanese Premier League
2	Sporting	3	2	0	1	7	4	+3	6	Promotion to Lebanese Premier League
3	Egtmaaey	3	2	0	1	7	5	+2	6	
4	Ahli Saida	3	2	0	1	7	6	+1	6	
5	Mabarra	3	1	1	1	4	4	0	4	
6	Nahda Barelias	3	1	1	1	3	3	0	4	
7	Bekaa	3	1	1	1	5	6	−1	4	
8	Racing Beirut	3	1	0	2	3	4	−1	3	
9	Ansar Howara	3	1	0	2	4	7	−3	3	
10	Islah Borj Shmali	3	0	2	1	2	3	−1	2	
11	Ahli Nabatieh	3	0	2	1	1	3	−2	2	Relegation to Lebanese Third Division
12	Nasser Bar Elias	3	0	1	2	4	8	−4	1	Relegation to Lebanese Third Division

Updated to match(es) played on 6 October 2019. Source: Goalzz
Rules for classification: 1) Points; 2) Head-to-head points; 3) Head-to-head goal difference; 4) Goal difference; 5) Goals scored; 6) Draw.

=== Cup competitions ===
==== Lebanese Super Cup ====
15 September 2019
16:00 UTC+3

Ansar	1–2	Ahed
Khamis 24' (o.g.)	Report	Akaïchi 26', 42'

Saida Municipal Stadium, Sidon
Attendance: 5,000
Referee: Mohammed Darwish

==== Lebanese Elite Cup ====
===== Final =====
25 August 2019
21:30 UTC+3

Shabab Sahel	3–3 (a.e.t.)	Ansar
A. Atwi 41'; Daouda 48'; Coulibaly 55'	Report	Onika 18'; Maatouk 60'; Hadji Malick 65'
Penalties
Onika (penalty scored); Coulibaly (penalty scored); Assi (penalty scored); Kourani (penalty scored); Daouda (penalty scored)	5–3	(penalty scored) Maatouk; (penalty missed) Louati; (penalty scored) Hadji Malick; (penalty scored) Kojok

Camille Chamoun Sports City Stadium, Beirut
Attendance: 6,000
Referee: Ali Reza

==== Lebanese Challenge Cup ====
===== Final =====
24 August 2019
17:00 UTC+3

Salam Zgharta	0–2	Bourj
	Report	Abou Hamdan 46'; Achour 89'

Fouad Chehab Stadium, Jounieh
Attendance: 1,000
Referee: Hussein Abu Yahya

== Women's football ==
=== Lebanese Women's Football League ===
Pos	Team	Pld	W	D	L	GF	GA	GD	Pts	Qualification
1	SAS	7	6	1	0	54	2	+52	19	Qualification to the final eight
2	Safa	7	5	1	1	43	2	+41	16	Qualification to the final eight
3	BFA	7	3	4	0	41	4	+37	13	Qualification to the final eight
4	ÓBerytus	7	4	1	2	28	8	+20	13	Qualification to the final eight
5	United Tripoli	7	2	2	3	18	15	+3	8	
6	Super Girls	7	2	1	4	15	25	−10	7	
7	Primo	7	1	0	6	5	53	−48	3	
8	Helium	7	0	0	7	0	95	−95	0	

Source: women.football.lb
Rules for classification: 1) Points; 2) Goal difference; 3) Number of goals scored

Pos	Team	Pld	W	D	L	GF	GA	GD	Pts	Qualification
1	EFP	7	7	0	0	63	3	+60	21	Qualification to the final eight
2	Akhaa Ahli Aley	7	6	0	1	27	9	+18	18	Qualification to the final eight
3	Stars of South	7	4	0	3	27	8	+19	12	Qualification to the final eight
4	Montada North Lebanon	7	4	0	3	14	23	−9	12	Qualification to the final eight
5	Sakafi Chhim	7	3	0	4	17	18	−1	9	
6	Salam Zgharta	6	2	0	4	7	31	−24	6	
7	Hoops	6	0	1	5	2	32	−30	1	
8	Kfarchima	7	0	1	6	4	37	−33	1	

Source: women.football.lb
Rules for classification: 1) Points; 2) Goal difference; 3) Number of goals scored

Pos	Team	Pld	W	D	L	GF	GA	GD	Pts	Qualification
1	SAS (C)	7	6	0	1	35	6	+29	18	Champions
2	Safa	7	5	2	0	26	5	+21	17	
3	EFP	7	5	1	1	29	6	+23	16	
4	BFA	7	3	1	3	8	13	−5	10	
5	Akhaa Ahli Aley	7	1	3	3	8	22	−14	6	
6	Stars of South	7	1	1	5	8	21	−13	4	
7	ÓBerytus	7	1	1	5	7	26	−19	4	
8	Montada North Lebanon	7	1	1	5	4	26	−22	4	

Source: women.football.lb
Rules for classification: 1) Points; 2) Goal difference; 3) Number of goals scored
(C) Champions
