= Ahmad El Choum =

Lebanese footballer

Personal information
- Full name: Ahmad Ali El Choum
- Date of birth: 3 August 1983 (age 43)
- Place of birth: Jeddah, Saudi Arabia
- Height: 1.77 m (5 ft 10 in)
- Position: Left-back

Senior career*
Years	Team	Apps	(Gls)
1997–2015	Ansar		

International career
2003–2008	Lebanon	23	(0)
- * Club domestic league appearances and goals

Ahmad Ali El Choum (Arabic: أحمد علي الشوم; born 3 August 1983) is a former footballer who played as a left-back for Ansar. Born in Saudi Arabia, he played for the Lebanon national team.

== Club career ==
El Choum began his senior career at Lebanese Premier League side Ansar, during the 1997–98 season. In his first season at the club, El Choum won three trophies: a league title, a Lebanese Elite Cup, the club's first, and a Lebanese Super Cup. The following season, in 1998–99, El Choum won his second consecutive league title with Ansar, as well as a Lebanese FA Cup. In 1999, El Choum lifted Ansar's first Lebanese Federation Cup, as well as a Lebanese Super Cup.

At the turn of the millennium, El Choum continued to win trophies with Ansar, helping his side win both the Elite Cup and Federation Cup during the 2000–01 season. For the following four seasons Ansar would remain trophyless, until the 2005–06, when El Choum won a domestic double with Ansar, lifting both the league title and the FA Cup. He would once again help Ansar win another domestic double, in 2006–07.

El Choum would further help Ansar win two more FA Cups, in 2009–10 and 2011–12, before his retirement in 2015. The Lebanese left-back won a total of four league titles, six FA Cups, two Elite Cups, two Federation Cups, and four Super Cups during his 14-season stay at Ansar.

== International career ==
El Choum made his senior international debut for Lebanon on 28 November 2003, in a 2004 AFC Asian Cup qualifier against Iran. Lebanon lost the encounter 1–0. El Choum's first victory with Lebanon came in his following match, on 8 February 2004, in a friendly against Bahrain. He helped Lebanon win 2–1. El Choum played 23 games with Lebanon, between 2003 and 2008.

== Personal life ==
El Choum has two brothers, Sami and Kassem, who have also played football.

== Career statistics ==
=== International ===
Appearances and goals by national team and year
National team	Year	Apps	Goals
Lebanon	2003	1	0
Lebanon	2004	9	0
Lebanon	2005	0	0
Lebanon	2006	4	0
Lebanon	2007	2	0
Lebanon	2008	7	0
Total		23	0

== Honours ==
Ansar

- Lebanese Premier League: 1997–98, 1998–99, 2005–06, 2006–07
- Lebanese FA Cup: 1998–99, 2001–02, 2005–06, 2006–07, 2009–10, 2011–12
- Lebanese Elite Cup: 1997, 2000
- Lebanese Federation Cup: 1999, 2000
- Lebanese Super Cup: 1997, 1998, 1999, 2012

== See also ==
- List of Lebanese people in Saudi Arabia
- List of Lebanon international footballers born outside Lebanon
- List of association football families
