= 2015–16 Lebanese Third Division =

Lebanese Premier League
- Season: 2015–16
- Champions: Nasr Brasilia
- Promoted: Al-Shabab Al Arabi; Nasr Brasilia
- Relegated: Ittihad Haret Al Naime; Al-Jalil Qana
- Matches played: 175
- Goals scored: 517 (2.95 per match)
- Biggest home win: Al-Oukhuwwa Kharayeb 8-0 Al-Fajr Arabsalim
- Biggest away win: Zamalek Beirut 1-9 Al-Shabab Al Arabi; Al-Sharq 0-8 Al-Shabab Al Arabi
- Highest scoring: Zamalek Beirut 1-9 Al-Shabab Al Arabi

The teams were divided into three groups of eight teams each. The first two teams of each group qualified to the playoffs and the first two teams qualified to the Second Division and replaced the relegated teams. The last two teams were submitted to the playoffs to decide which two of these five teams were relegated to the Fourth Division.

== Regular season ==
=== Group 1 ===
Pos	Team	Pld	W	D	L	GF	GA	GD	Pts	Promotion or relegation
1	Al-Oukhuwwa Kharayeb	14	7	6	1	29	12	+17	27	Promotion Group
2	Shabab Houmin Al Tahta	14	7	5	2	23	11	+12	26	Promotion Group
3	Bint Jbeil	14	6	5	3	28	16	+12	23	
4	Salam Sour	14	5	3	6	16	22	−6	18	
5	Al-Riyadi Al-Hibasiyet	14	4	5	5	19	16	+3	17	
6	Al-Fajr Arabsalim	14	5	2	7	19	31	−12	17	
7	Al-Jalil Qana	14	2	5	7	11	22	−11	11	Relegation Group
8	Jamiyet Maarake	14	2	5	7	15	30	−15	11	Relegation Group

Updated to match(es) played on 19 April 2016. Source:
Rules for classification: 1) Points; 2) Goal difference; 3) Head to Head Record

=== Group 2 ===
Pos	Team	Pld	W	D	L	GF	GA	GD	Pts	Promotion or relegation
1	Homenmen Beirut	14	8	3	3	30	12	+18	27	Promotion Group
2	Al-Ahli Sarba FC	14	6	4	4	19	19	0	22	
3	Chekka Al-Riaydi	14	6	4	4	17	17	0	22	Promotion Group
4	Nejmet al-Sahraa'	14	6	1	7	26	27	−1	19	
5	Shabab Tripoli	14	4	6	4	14	13	+1	18	
6	Al Arabi Tripoli	14	4	6	4	16	16	0	18	
7	Haref Ardet	14	3	7	4	20	25	−5	16	Relegation Group
8	Ittihad Haret Al Naime	14	2	3	9	15	28	−13	9	Relegation Group

Updated to match(es) played on 19 April 2016. Source:
Rules for classification: 1) Points; 2) Goal difference; 3) Head to Head Record

=== Group 3 ===
Pos	Team	Pld	W	D	L	GF	GA	GD	Pts	Promotion or relegation
1	Al-Shabab Al Arabi	12	11	1	0	40	4	+36	34	Promotion Group
2	Nasr Brasilia	12	9	1	2	31	9	+22	28	Promotion Group
3	Al-Khoyol	12	5	2	5	20	24	−4	17	
4	Al-Borj	12	3	4	5	13	17	−4	13	
5	Al-Sharq	12	2	4	6	8	22	−14	10	
6	Barjalona	12	2	3	7	11	26	−15	9	
7	Zamalek Beirut	12	1	3	8	7	28	−21	6	Relegation Group
8	Al Ershad	0	0	0	0	0	0	0	0	Did not play

Updated to match(es) played on 19 April 2016. Source:
Rules for classification: 1) Points; 2) Goal difference; 3) Head to Head Record

== Promotion Group ==
Pos	Team	Pld	W	D	L	GF	GA	GD	Pts	Relegation
1	Nasr Brasilia (P)	5	3	2	0	10	6	+4	11	Promotion to Lebanese Second Division
2	Al-Shabab Al Arabi (P)	5	3	1	1	15	10	+5	10	Promotion to Lebanese Second Division
3	Chekka Al-Riaydi	5	3	0	2	11	8	+3	9	
4	Shabab Houmin Al Tahta	5	2	1	2	11	10	+1	7	
5	Al-Oukhuwwa Kharayeb	5	1	2	2	13	13	0	5	
6	Homenmen Beirut	5	0	0	5	6	19	−13	0	

Updated to match(es) played on 14 May 2016. Source:
Rules for classification: 1) Points; 2) Goal difference; 3) Head to Head Record
(P) Promoted

== Relegation Group ==
Pos	Team	Pld	W	D	L	GF	GA	GD	Pts	Relegation
1	Jamiyet Maarake	4	2	2	0	5	2	+3	8	
2	Zamalek Beirut	4	1	3	0	8	5	+3	6	
3	Haref Ardet	4	1	3	0	4	3	+1	6	
4	Ittihad Haret Al Naime (R)	4	1	1	2	4	6	−2	4	Relegation to Lebanese Fourth Division
5	Al-Jalil Qana (R)	4	0	1	3	2	7	−5	1	Relegation to Lebanese Fourth Division

Updated to match(es) played on 14 May 2016. Source:
Rules for classification: 1) Points; 2) Goal difference; 3) Head to Head Record
(R) Relegated
