= Mohamad Kdouh =

Mohamad Kdouh may refer to:

- Mohamad Kdouh (footballer, born 1993), Lebanese association football player
- Mohamad Kdouh (footballer, born 1997), Lebanese association football player
