= Mahmoud Siblini =

Lebanese footballer (born 1993)

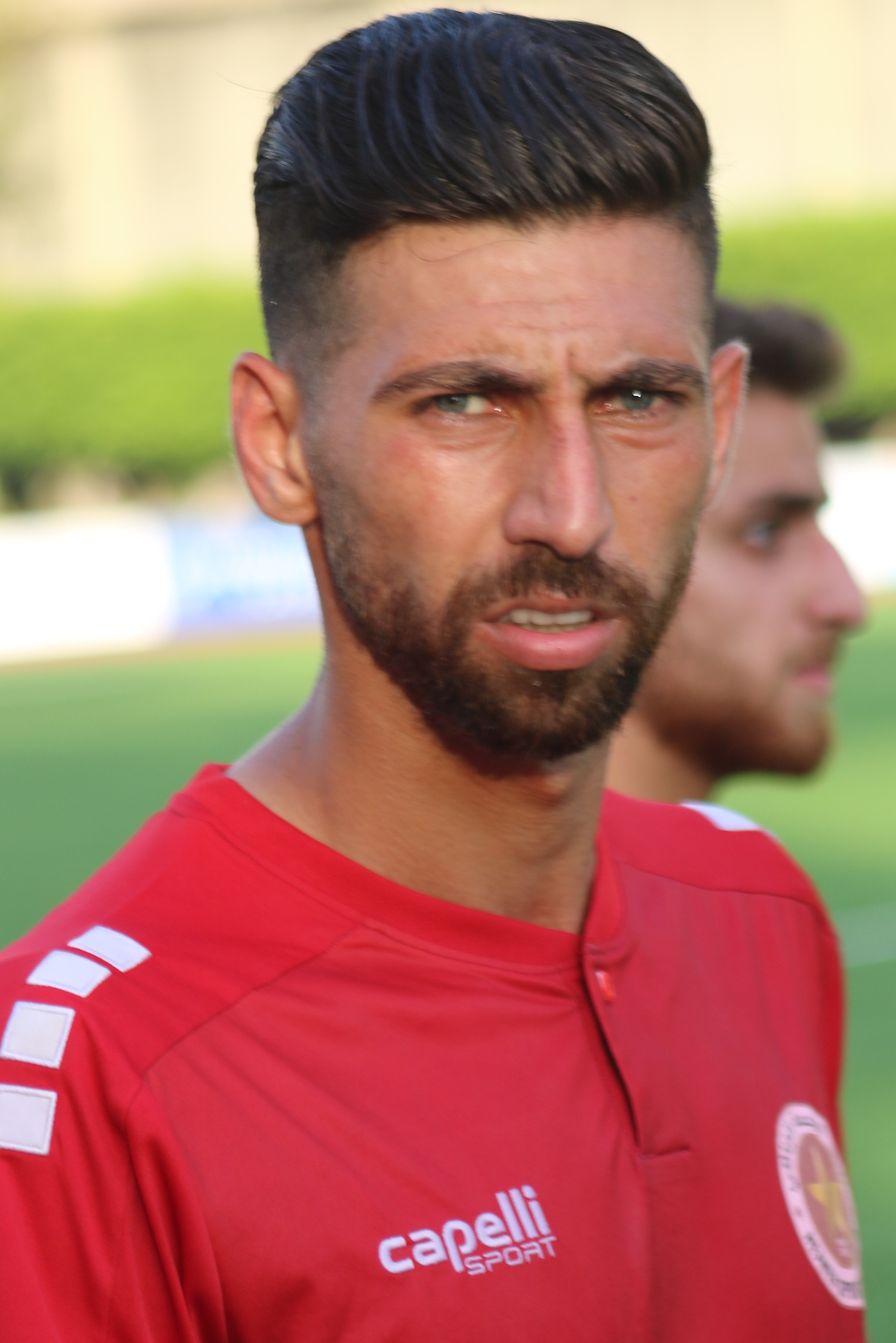
- Siblini with Nejmeh in 2020

Personal information
- Full name: Mahmoud Mohamed Siblini
- Date of birth: 15 July 1993 (age 33)
- Place of birth: Saksakiyeh, Lebanon
- Height: 1.81 m (5 ft 11 in)
- Position: Striker

Team information
- Current team: Mabarra
- Number: 17

Senior career*
Years	Team	Apps	(Gls)
2011–2014	Ahli Saida	18	(1)
2014–2022	Nejmeh	60	(21)
2017–2018	→ Tadamon Sour (loan)	17	(1)
2022–2023	Ahed	14	(2)
2023–2025	Shabab Sahel	13	(5)
2025–	Mabarra	19	(2)

International career
2011	Lebanon U19	4	(1)
2015	Lebanon U23	4	(1)
2014–2016	Lebanon	4	(1)
- * Club domestic league appearances and goals as of 3 July 2026

Mahmoud Mohamed Siblini (Arabic: محمود محمد سبليني; born 15 July 1993) is a Lebanese footballer who plays as a striker for Lebanese Premier League club Mabarra.

Starting his career at Ahli Saida in 2011, Siblini moved to Nejmeh in 2014 before being sent on a season-long loan to Tadamon Sour in 2017. Siblini finished joint-top scorer of the 2021–22 Lebanese Premier League with Nejmeh. He joined Ahed in 2022 and Shabab Sahel in 2023.

Having already represented Lebanon internationally at youth level, Siblini debuted for the senior team in 2014.

== Club career ==
Siblini started his club career at his hometown club Ahli Saida during the 2011–12 Lebanese Premier League, playing 18 games and scoring one goal. Despite finishing in last place and being relegated to the Lebanese Second Division, Siblini remained at the club for two further seasons.

On 13 August 2014, Siblini moved to Nejmeh, scoring one league goal in eight games, and winning the Lebanese Elite Cup and Lebanese Super Cup. The following season, in 2015–16, Siblini scored four league goals in 17 games, and helped his side win the Lebanese FA Cup. On 9 April 2016, Siblini sustained an ACL injury, ruling him out for the majority of the 2016–17 season.

In August 2017, he was sent on a season-long loan to Tadamon Sour, where he scored one goal in 17 games. Upon his return to Nejmeh, Siblini went through another ACL injury on 23 May 2018, in a 2018–19 Arab Club Champions Cup match against Tunisian club Club Africain. He recovered over seven months later, in January 2019.

Siblini scored 10 goals in the 2021–22 Lebanese Premier League, and finished top scorer of the season, joint with Fadel Antar. With his contract due to expire in the summer, in May 2022 Ahed's president Tamim Sleiman confirmed that he had signed Siblini on a free transfer on a three-year contract. Siblini officially joined on 2 June. On 8 May 2023, Siblini moved to Shabab Sahel on a two-year contract.

In July 2025, Siblini joined newly promoted club Mabarra.

== International career ==
Siblini was a youth international for Lebanon at under-19 and under-23 levels.

He was first called up to the Lebanon national team in October 2014, as part of a mixed squad of senior and Olympic players for friendly matches against Qatar and Saudi Arabia. Siblini made his senior debut on 14 October 2014, in a 1–1 draw against Saudi Arabia. He scored his first goal on his second game for Lebanon, on 6 November 2014, in a 3–2 defeat to the United Arab Emirates.

== Personal life ==
On 15 February 2021, Siblini and his Nejmeh teammate Mohamad Salem were involved in a car crash on their way to training; they only suffered a few bruises.

== Career statistics ==
=== International ===
As of goal scored on 6 November 2014
Scores and results list Lebanon's goal tally first, score column indicates score after each Siblini goal.

List of international goals scored by Mahmoud Siblini
No.	Date	Venue	Opponent	Score	Result	Competition	Ref.
1	6 November 2014	Prince Abdullah bin Jalawi Stadium, Hofuf, Saudi Arabia	United Arab Emirates	2–2	2–3	Friendly	

== Honours ==
Nejmeh

- Lebanese FA Cup: 2015–16, 2021–22; runner-up: 2020–21
- Lebanese Elite Cup: 2014, 2016, 2018, 2021
- Lebanese Super Cup: 2014, 2016; runner-up: 2021

Ahed

- Lebanese Premier League: 2022–23
- Lebanese Elite Cup: 2022
- Lebanese FA Cup runner-up: 2022–23

Individual

- Lebanese Premier League top goalscorer: 2021–22 (Note: Tied with Fadel Antar)
