= 2021 Lebanese Elite Cup =

2021 edition of the Lebanese Elite Cup

Tournament details
- Country: Lebanon
- Dates: 12 – 31 July
- Teams: 6

Final positions
- Champions: Nejmeh (12th title)
- Runners-up: Ahed

Tournament statistics
- Matches played: 9
- Goals scored: 32 (3.56 per match)
- Top goal scorer(s): Gabriel Bitar; Fadel Antar (3 goals each)

The 2021 Lebanese Elite Cup was the 23rd edition of the Lebanese Elite Cup. The competition included the six best teams from the 2020–21 Lebanese Premier League season. The first matchday was played on 12 July, one day before the start of the 2021 Lebanese Challenge Cup. Shabab Sahel, the defending champions, lost to Ahed in the semi-finals. Nejmeh were crowned champions for the 12th time, after defeating Ahed in the final after penalty shoot-outs.

== Group stage ==
=== Group A ===
Pos	Team	Pld	W	D	L	GF	GA	GD	Pts	Qualification
1	Ansar	2	2	0	0	5	8	−3	6	Qualification for the semi-finals
2	Ahed	2	1	0	1	4	1	+3	3	Qualification for the semi-finals
3	Akhaa Ahli Aley	2	0	0	2	1	1	0	0	

Source: Global Sports Archive
12 July 2021
17:30 UTC+3

Ansar	4–1	Akhaa Ahli Aley
Bitar 7', 80'; Khrayzat 11'; Khabbaz 15' (o.g.)	Report	Chehayeb 4'

Fouad Chehab Stadium, Jounieh

16 July 2021
17:30 UTC+3

Ansar	1–0	Ahed
Bitar 58'	Report

Amin Abdelnour Stadium, Bhamdoun

20 July 2021
17:30 UTC+3

Akhaa Ahli Aley	0–4	Ahed
	Report	Al Haj 12', 25'; Awada 75'; Nasser 89'

Fouad Chehab Stadium, Jounieh

=== Group B ===
Pos	Team	Pld	W	D	L	GF	GA	GD	Pts	Qualification
1	Shabab Sahel	2	2	0	0	5	3	+2	6	Qualification for the semi-finals
2	Nejmeh	2	1	0	1	5	3	+2	3	Qualification for the semi-finals
3	Safa	2	0	0	2	1	5	−4	0	

Source: Global Sports Archive
12 July 2019
17:30 UTC+3

Nejmeh	3–0	Safa
Salem 7', 44'; Annan 59'	Report

Amin Abdelnour Stadium, Bhamdoun

16 July 2019
17:30 UTC+3

Nejmeh	2–3	Shabab Sahel
Siblini 5'; Kassab 57' (o.g.)	Report	Khoury 24'; Khalifeh 34'; Antar 61'

Fouad Chehab Stadium, Jounieh

20 July 2019
17:30 UTC+3

Safa	1–2	Shabab Sahel
Jalloul 63'	Report	Hammoud 67'; Antar 73'

Amin Abdelnour Stadium, Bhamdoun

== Final stage ==
Semi-finals; 24 July 2021
Ansar	0
Nejmeh	1
Ahed	2 (4)
Shabab Sahel	2 (2)

Final; 31 July 2021
Nejmeh	3 (5)
Ahed	3 (4)

=== Semi-finals ===
24 July 2021
17:00 UTC+3

Ansar	0–1	Nejmeh
	Report	Siblini 31'

Fouad Chehab Stadium, Jounieh

24 July 2021
17:00 UTC+3

Ahed	2–2	Shabab Sahel
Kassab 45+1' (o.g.); Haidar 90+6' (pen.)	Report	Jaafar 67' (pen.); Antar 83'
Penalties
Kdouh (penalty scored); Monzer (penalty scored); Mansour (penalty scored); Faour (penalty scored)	4–2	(penalty scored) Assi; (penalty scored) Jaafar; (penalty missed) Haidar; (penalty missed) Antar

Amin Abdelnour Stadium, Bhamdoun

=== Final ===
31 July 2021
17:00 UTC+3

Nejmeh	3–3	Ahed
Zein 29', 50'; Takaji 42'	Report	Nasser 34'; Kdouh 58'; Khamis 64'
Penalties
Al Saadi (penalty scored); Annan (penalty scored); Kourani (penalty scored); Chehade (penalty scored); Bader (penalty scored)	5–4	(penalty scored) Kdouh; (penalty scored) Monzer; (penalty scored) Zein; (penalty missed) Farran; (penalty scored) Dakik

Fouad Chehab Stadium, Jounieh
Referee: Hussein Abou Yehia

== Top scorers ==
Rank	Player	Club	Goals
1	(Lebanon) Gabriel Bitar	Ansar	3
1	(Lebanon) Fadel Antar	Shabab Sahel	3
2	(Lebanon) Mehdi Zein	Nejmeh	2
2	(Lebanon) Ali Al Haj	Ahed	2
2	(Lebanon) Mohamad Nasser	Ahed	2
2	(Lebanon) Mahmoud Siblini	Nejmeh	2
2	(Lebanon) Mohamad Salem	Nejmeh	2
