= Fadel Antar =

Lebanese footballer (born 1995)

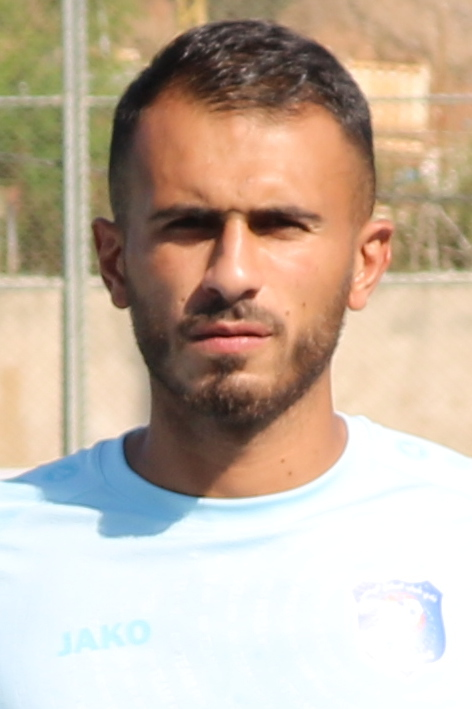
- Antar with Shabab Sahel in 2021

Personal information
- Full name: Fadel Mohammad Antar
- Date of birth: 13 November 1995 (age 31)
- Place of birth: Ain Baal, Lebanon
- Height: 1.86 m (6 ft 1 in)
- Position: Striker

Team information
- Current team: Ahed
- Number: 9

Senior career*
Years	Team	Apps	(Gls)
2017–2018	Safa	2	(0)
2018–2020	Tadamon Sour	15	(1)
2020–2021	Bourj	15	(5)
2021–2024	Shabab Sahel	40	(17)
2022	→ Kelantan (loan)	2	(0)
2024–2025	Nejmeh	21	(6)
2025–	Ahed	25	(6)

International career^{‡}
2016–2018	Lebanon U23	6	(2)
2021–2022	Lebanon	4	(0)
- * Club domestic league appearances and goals as of 09:55, 4 August 2026 (UTC) ‡ National team caps and goals as of 15:15, 27 January 2022 (UTC)

Fadel Mohammad Antar (Arabic: فاضل محمد عنتر; born 13 November 1995) is a Lebanese footballer who plays as a striker for Lebanese Premier League club Ahed.

== Club career ==
=== Early career ===
Antar began his career at Safa in 2017, playing two games in the 2017–18 Lebanese Premier League. He then joined Tadamon Sour in 2018, helping them win the Lebanese Challenge Cup in 2018. On 17 August 2020, Antar joined Bourj. He terminated his contract on 18 May 2021, having scored five goals in the 2020–21 Lebanese Premier League.

=== Shabab Sahel ===
On 28 May 2021, Antar moved to Shabab Sahel on a three-year contract. He scored a hat-trick against Safa on 18 September, helping his team win 5–0. The following matchday, on 25 September, Antar scored four goals against Tripoli in a 4–1 win. He finished the first half of the season as top scorer, with 10 goals in 11 games. Despite having left mid-season, Antar finished top scorer of the 2021–22 Lebanese Premier League, joint with Mahmoud Siblini.

=== Kelantan ===
On 9 January 2022, Malaysia Premier League side Kelantan announced the transfer of Antar, ahead of the 2022 season. He was quickly dubbed "the next [Mohamad] Ghaddar", a Lebanese player who had also played for Kelantan. He officially joined on loan from Shabab Sahel on 27 February. Antar scored on his debut on 13 March, in a 2–1 defeat to Super League club Petaling Jaya City in the first round of the Malaysia FA Cup.

=== Nejmeh ===
At the end of his contract at Sahel, Antar moved to Nejmeh ahead of the 2024–25 season.

=== Ahed ===
In July 2025, Antar joined Ahed ahead of the 2025–26 season.

== International career ==
Antar represented Lebanon internationally at under-23 level.

He was first called up to the senior team in view of the 2022 FIFA World Cup qualification matches in October 2021. On 1 December 2021, Antar made his senior debut in the 2021 FIFA Arab Cup, as a substitute in a 1–0 defeat to Egypt.

== Career statistics ==
=== International ===
As of match played 27 January 2022

Appearances and goals by national team and year
National team	Year	Apps	Goals
Lebanon	2021	3	0
Lebanon	2022	1	0
Total		4	0

== Honours ==
Tadamon Sour

- Lebanese Challenge Cup: 2018

Nejmeh

- Lebanese Super Cup: 2024

Individual

- Lebanese Premier League top goalscorer: 2021–22 (Note: Tied with Mahmoud Siblini)
- Lebanese Elite Cup top goalscorer: 2021 (Note: Tied with Gabriel Bitar)
