= Mohamad Salem =

Lebanese footballer (born 1995)

Personal information
- Full name: Mohamad Khodor Salem
- Date of birth: 5 October 1995 (age 31)
- Place of birth: Qlaileh, Lebanon
- Height: 1.69 m (5 ft 7 in)
- Position: Midfielder

Senior career*
Years	Team	Apps	(Gls)
2012–2019	Shabab Sahel	58	(10)
2014–2015	→ Akhaa Ahli Aley	15	(0)
2019–2021	Nejmeh	0	(0)
Total		73	(10)

International career
2013	Lebanon U19	2	(1)
2017	Lebanon U23	2	(0)
2013	Lebanon	1	(0)
- * Club domestic league appearances and goals

Mohamad Khodor Salem (Arabic: محمد خضر سالم; born 2 February 1995) is a Lebanese former footballer who played as a midfielder.

== Club career ==
Salem joined Nejmeh in the Lebanese Premier League on 29 July 2019, coming from Shabab Sahel. On 10 March 2020, Salem suffered an ACL injury; he underwent surgery on 7 May. On 12 July 2021, Salem scored a brace against Safa in the 2021 Lebanese Elite Cup group stage.

== Personal life ==
On 15 February 2021, Salem and his Nejmeh teammate Mahmoud Siblini were involved in a car crash on their way to training; they only suffered a few bruises.

== Honours ==
Nejmeh

- Lebanese FA Cup: 2021–22; runner-up: 2020–21
