= Wasim Abdalhadi =

Palestinian footballer (born 1982)

Personal information
- Full name: Wasim Mohammed Saleh Abdalhadi
- Date of birth: 28 December 1982 (age 43)
- Place of birth: Sidon, Lebanon
- Height: 1.85 m (6 ft 1 in)
- Position: Striker

Team information
- Current team: Homenetmen Bourj Hammoud

Senior career*
Years	Team	Apps	(Gls)
2002–2004	Islah Borj Shmali		
2004–2005	Ansar		(3)
2005–2006	Safa		(2)
2006–2007	Tadamon Sour		(5)
2008–2009	Racing Beirut		(5)
2009–2010	Islah Borj Shmali		(8)
2010–2012	Racing Beirut		(10)
2012–2013	Ansar	18	(4)
2013–2016	Shabab Sahel	65	(20)
2016–2018	Tadamon Sour	39	(10)
2018–2019	Bourj		
2019–2021	Sagesse		(12)
2021–2022	Racing Beirut	19	(12)
2022–2023	Akhaa Ahli Aley	18	(1)
2023–2024	Bint Jbeil	19	(13)
2024–2025	Mabarra	8	(2)
2025–	Homenetmen Bourj Hammoud		(19)

International career
2004	Palestine	2	(0)
- * Club domestic league appearances and goals as of 00:40, 11 August 2026 (UTC)

Wasim Mohammed Saleh Abdalhadi (Arabic: وسيم محمد صالح عبد الهادي; born 28 December 1982) is a footballer who plays as a striker for Lebanese Third Division club Homenetmen Bourj Hammoud. Born in Lebanon, he played for the Palestine national team.

== Club career ==
Abdalhadi scored 12 goals in the 2020–21 Lebanese Second Division, and helped Sagesse gain promotion to the Lebanese Premier League. After having moved to Racing Beirut ahead of the 2021–22 Second Division, Abdalhadi finished the season once again with 12 goals; he was the joint-top scorer with Mazen Jammal of Ahli Saida.

Abdalhadi returned to the Lebanese Premier League on 13 July 2022, signing for Akhaa Ahli Aley.

== Honours ==
Akhaa Ahli Aley

- Lebanese Challenge Cup: 2022

Individual

- Lebanese Second Division top goalscorer: 2021–22 (Note: Tied with Mazen Jammal), 2023–24 (Note: Tied with Pemaza)
