= 2021–22 Lebanese Third Division =

Lebanese Third Division
- Season: 2021–22
- Dates: 5 November 2021 – 13 February 2022
- Champions: Riyadi Abbasiyah
- Promoted: Riyadi Abbasiyah; Bint Jbeil
- Relegated: Harouf; Achbal Mina'a; Zamalek Beirut; Riada Wal Adab
- Matches: 73
- Goals: 224 (3.07 per match)

The Lebanese Third Division (Arabic: الدوري اللبناني الدرجة الثالثة) is the third division of Lebanese football. It is controlled by the Lebanese Football Association. It operates on a system of promotion and relegation with the Lebanese Second Division and Lebanese Fourth Division.

Riyadi Abbasiyah won the 2021–22 Lebanese Third Division title on 13 February 2022, finishing the four-team promotion play-off with seven points after a 0–0 draw with Bint Jbeil.

== League table ==
=== Group 1 ===
Pos	Team	Pld	W	D	L	GF	GA	GD	Pts	Promotion or relegation
1	Bint Jbeil	10	8	1	1	30	7	+23	25	Qualification for promotion play-offs
2	Rissala Toura	10	8	0	2	31	7	+24	24	
3	Nahda Ain Baal	10	4	1	5	19	15	+4	13	
4	Salam Sour	10	3	0	7	14	38	−24	9	
5	Harouf	10	2	2	6	15	31	−16	8	Qualification for relegation play-offs
6	El Kosaibeh	10	2	2	6	11	22	−11	8	Qualification for relegation play-offs

Source: Global Sports Archive
Rules for classification: 1) Points; 2) Head-to-head points; 3) Head-to-head goal difference; 4) Goal difference; 5) Goals scored; 6) Draw.

=== Group 2 ===
Pos	Team	Pld	W	D	L	GF	GA	GD	Pts	Promotion or relegation
1	Ansar Mawadda	10	6	2	2	12	7	+5	20	Qualification for promotion play-offs
2	Ansar Howara	10	6	1	3	18	11	+7	19	
3	Shabab Tripoli	10	5	2	3	18	16	+2	17	
4	Harakat Al Shabab	10	4	3	3	11	7	+4	15	
5	Achbal Mina'a	10	4	2	4	11	11	0	14	Qualification for relegation play-offs
6	Riada Wal Adab	10	0	0	10	7	25	−18	0	Qualification for relegation play-offs

Source: Global Sports Archive
Rules for classification: 1) Points; 2) Head-to-head points; 3) Head-to-head goal difference; 4) Goal difference; 5) Goals scored; 6) Draw.

=== Group 3 ===
Pos	Team	Pld	W	D	L	GF	GA	GD	Pts	Promotion or relegation
1	Riyadi Abbasiyah	10	6	4	0	21	5	+16	22	Qualification for promotion play-offs
2	Ittihad Haret Naameh	10	6	3	1	14	5	+9	21	
3	Taqadom Anqoun	10	5	5	0	30	12	+18	20	
4	Mahabbe Tripoli	10	3	1	6	12	19	−7	10	
5	Antranik	10	2	1	7	9	22	−13	7	Qualification for relegation play-offs
6	Zamalek Beirut	10	0	2	8	10	33	−23	2	Qualification for relegation play-offs

Source: Global Sports Archive
Rules for classification: 1) Points; 2) Head-to-head points; 3) Head-to-head goal difference; 4) Goal difference; 5) Goals scored; 6) Draw.

=== Group 4 ===
Pos	Team	Pld	W	D	L	GF	GA	GD	Pts	Promotion or relegation
1	Irshad Chehim	10	7	2	1	27	9	+18	23	Qualification for promotion play-offs
2	Hilal Haret Naameh	10	5	2	3	17	15	+2	17	
3	Wahda Marj	10	4	3	3	9	12	−3	15	
4	Nasser	10	3	3	4	11	14	−3	12	
5	Raya	10	2	3	5	10	16	−6	9	Qualification for relegation play-offs
6	Homenmen	10	2	1	7	7	15	−8	7	Qualification for relegation play-offs

Source: Global Sports Archive
Rules for classification: 1) Points; 2) Head-to-head points; 3) Head-to-head goal difference; 4) Goal difference; 5) Goals scored; 6) Draw.

== Promotion play-offs ==
Pos	Team	Pld	W	D	L	GF	GA	GD	Pts	Promotion
1	Riyadi Abbasiyah	3	2	1	0	4	1	+3	7	Promotion to Lebanese Second Division
2	Bint Jbeil	3	1	2	0	3	2	+1	5	Promotion to Lebanese Second Division
3	Irshad Chehim	3	1	1	1	5	5	0	4	
4	Ansar Mawadda	3	0	0	3	1	5	−4	0	

Source: Global Sports Archive
Rules for classification: 1) Points; 2) Head-to-head points; 3) Head-to-head goal difference; 4) Goal difference; 5) Goals scored; 6) Draw.

== Relegation play-offs ==
Date	Team	Score	Team
29 January 2022	Harouf	0–0, 4–5 (p)	Homenmen
30 January 2022	Achbal Mina'a	1–3	El Kosaibeh
30 January 2022	Antranik	1–0	Zamalek Beirut
30 January 2022	Raya	1–0	Riada Wal Adab
