= Houssein Rizk =

Lebanese footballer

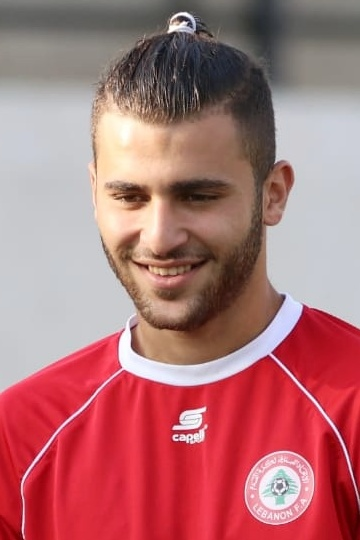
- Rizk with Lebanon in 2019

Personal information
- Full name: Houssein Hassan Rizk
- Date of birth: 1 January 1997 (age 29)
- Place of birth: Aabbassiyeh, Lebanon
- Height: 1.68 m (5 ft 6 in)
- Position: Midfielder

Team information
- Current team: Shabab Sahel
- Number: 27

Senior career*
Years	Team	Apps	(Gls)
2016–2017	Mabarra		
2017–2018	Nabi Chit	20	(3)
2018–	Shabab Sahel	71	(2)
2025	→ Mabarra (loan)	8	(1)

International career
2015	Lebanon U19	3	(0)
2017	Lebanon U20		(0)
2019	Lebanon	1	(0)
- * Club domestic league appearances and goals as of 2 July 2026

Houssein Hassan Rizk (Arabic: حسين حسن رزق, Lebanese Arabic pronunciation: [ħ(u)seːn rɪzʔ]; born 1 January 1997), also known as Nona (Arabic: نونا), is a Lebanese footballer who plays as a midfielder for Lebanese Premier League club Shabab Sahel, whom he captains.

== Club career ==
=== Nabi Chit ===
Coming from Mabarra, Rizk joined Nabi Chit in September 2017, ahead of the 2017–18 Lebanese Premier League season. He scored three goals in 20 games, helping his side avoid relegation by finishing in 10th place.

=== Shabab Sahel ===
On 6 July 2018, Rizk joined newly promoted Lebanese Premier League side Shabab Sahel. In 2018–19 Rizk played 20 games, scoring once. He helped Shabab Sahel win their first Lebanese Elite Cup in 2019, beating Ansar in the final on penalty shoot-outs.

On 3 January 2021, Rizk sustained an ACL injury to his right knee, in a league match against Nejmeh. He renewed his contract for two further seasons on 10 May. Rizk sustained another ACL injury, to his left knee, in February 2022; he underwent surgery.

In March 2025, Rizk was sent on loan to Mabarra for the remainder of the 2024–25 Lebanese Second Division.

== International career ==
In March 2017, aged 20, Rizk was called up to a Lebanon national under-23 team training camp. In June 2017, he participated with the Lebanon national under-20 team in the 2017 Jeux de la Francophonie.

Rizk made his debut for the Lebanon national team on 15 October 2019, coming on as a substitute in a 3–0 away win against Sri Lanka in the 2022 FIFA World Cup qualifiers.

== Career statistics ==
=== International ===
As of match played 15 October 2019

Appearances and goals by national team and year
National team	Year	Apps	Goals
Lebanon	2019	1	0
Total		1	0

== Honours ==
Shabab Sahel

- Lebanese Elite Cup: 2019
