= 2020–21 Lebanese Second Division =

Lebanese Second Division
- Season: 2020–21
- Dates: 2 October 2020 – 16 April 2021
- Champions: Sporting
- Promoted: Sporting; Sagesse
- Relegated: Nasser Club Bar Elias; Ansar Howara
- Matches played: 96
- Goals scored: 289 (3.01 per match)
- Top goalscorer: Mohamad Kdouh (15)
- Biggest win: Sporting 6–0 Egtmaaey (6 November 2020)
- Highest scoring: Ansar Howara 3–5 Nabi Chit (28 March 2021); Ansar Howara 2–6 Mabarra (19 April 2021)

The Lebanese Second Division (Arabic: الدوري اللبناني الدرجة الثانية) is the second division of Lebanese football. It is controlled by the Lebanese Football Association. The top two teams qualify for the Lebanese Premier League and replace the relegated teams, while the bottom two are relegated to the Lebanese Third Division. The league was initially scheduled to start in September, before being postponed to 2 October as part of preventive measures by the state towards the COVID-19 pandemic.

It is the first season to feature a "split" format, where the season is divided into two phases. In the first phase, each club plays against each other once, for a total of 11 matchdays. In the second phase, the league is split into two halves – the "top six" and the "bottom six". Points are carried over from the first phase, and each club plays five games within its own half. Due to the COVID-19 pandemic, all games in the season were played behind closed doors.

As the 2019–20 season was cancelled, Sporting and Ansar Howara were the promoted teams from the Third Division, while Bekaa and Racing Beirut were relegated from the Lebanese Premier League. Sporting and Sagesse finished in first and second place respectively, and were promoted to the Lebanese Premier League, whereas Nasser Bar Elias and Ansar Howara finished in the bottom two positions, and were relegated to the Lebanese Third Division.

== Teams ==
Locations of the 2020–21 Lebanese Second Division teams

Team	Home city	2018–19 season
Ahli Nabatieh	Nabatieh	6th in the Lebanese Second Division
Ahli Saida	Sidon	3rd in the Lebanese Second Division
Ansar Howara	Houara	2nd in the Lebanese Third Division
Nabi Chit	Al-Nabi Shayth	12th in the Lebanese Premier League
Egtmaaey	Tripoli	5th in the Lebanese Second Division
Islah Borj Shmali	Tyre	9th in the Lebanese Second Division
Mabarra	Beirut	10th in the Lebanese Second Division
Nahda Barelias	Barelias	7th in the Lebanese Second Division
Nasser Club Bar Elias	Barelias	8th in the Lebanese Second Division
Racing Beirut	Beirut	11th in the Lebanese Premier League
Sagesse	Beirut	4th in the Lebanese Second Division
Sporting	Beirut	1st in the Lebanese Third Division

== League table ==
Pos	Team	Pld	W	D	L	GF	GA	GD	Pts	Promotion or relegation (Note: Teams play each other once (11 matches), before the league is split into two groups (the top six and the bottom six).)
1	Sporting (C, P)	16	10	5	1	38	12	+26	35	Promotion to Lebanese Premier League
2	Sagesse (P)	16	9	5	2	24	10	+14	32	Promotion to Lebanese Premier League
3	Ahli Nabatieh	16	9	2	5	25	14	+11	29	
4	Islah Borj Shmali	16	7	4	5	28	18	+10	25	
5	Ahli Saida	16	7	4	5	28	24	+4	25	
6	Nahda Barelias	16	4	7	5	14	20	−6	19	
7	Racing Beirut	16	8	5	3	29	19	+10	29	
8	Egtmaaey	16	5	4	7	20	33	−13	19	
9	Nabi Chit	16	5	3	8	26	30	−4	18	
10	Mabarra	16	4	4	8	19	24	−5	16	
11	Nasser Bar Elias (R)	16	2	5	9	17	31	−14	11	Relegation to Lebanese Third Division
12	Ansar Howara (R)	16	1	2	13	21	54	−33	5	Relegation to Lebanese Third Division

Source: Goalzz
Rules for classification: 1) Points; 2) Head-to-head points; 3) Head-to-head goal difference; 4) Goal difference; 5) Goals scored; 6) Draw.
(C) Champions; (P) Promoted; (R) Relegated

== Top scorers ==
Rank	Player	Club	Goals
1	(Lebanon) Mohamad Kdouh	Racing Beirut	15
2	(Palestine) Wasim Abdalhadi	Sagesse	12
3	(Lebanon) Mazen Jamal	Ahli Saida	11
4	(Lebanon) Hassan Termos	Sporting	10
5	(Lebanon) Ali Abbas	Sporting	9
5	(Lebanon) Ayman Abou Sahyoun	Islah Borj Shmali	9
