= 2022 Lebanese Elite Cup =

24th edition of annual football competition

Tournament details
- Country: Lebanon
- Dates: 27 July – 20 August
- Teams: 6

Final positions
- Champions: Ahed (6th title)
- Runners-up: Ansar

Tournament statistics
- Matches played: 9
- Goals scored: 26 (2.89 per match)
- Top goal scorer: Elhadji Malick Tall (3 goals)

The 2022 Lebanese Elite Cup was the 24th and last edition of the Lebanese Elite Cup. The competition included the six best teams from the 2021–22 Lebanese Premier League season. The first matchday was played on 27 July, one day before the start of the 2022 Lebanese Challenge Cup. Ahed won their sixth title after defeating Ansar 2–1 in the final on 20 August.

== Group stage ==
=== Group A ===
Pos	Team	Pld	W	D	L	GF	GA	GD	Pts	Qualification
1	Ahed	2	2	0	0	3	0	+3	6	Qualification for the semi-finals
2	Shabab Sahel	2	1	0	1	2	2	0	3	Qualification for the semi-finals
3	Bourj	2	0	0	2	1	4	−3	0	

Source: Global Sports Archive
27 July 2022
16:00 UTC+3

Ahed	2–0	Bourj
Zreik 11'; Kadiri 90+1'	Report

Fouad Chehab Stadium, Jounieh
Referee: Mohamad Haddad

2 August 2022
17:00 UTC+3

Ahed	1–0	Shabab Sahel
Siblini 70'	Report

Amin Abdelnour Stadium, Bhamdoun
Referee: Ali Al Ashkar

8 August 2022
17:00 UTC+3

Bourj	1–2	Shabab Sahel
Sadek 89'	Report	Haidar 30'; Khalife 90+7'

Al Ahed Stadium, Beirut
Referee: Kazem El Khansa

=== Group B ===
Pos	Team	Pld	W	D	L	GF	GA	GD	Pts	Qualification
1	Ansar	2	1	1	0	5	3	+2	4	Qualification for the semi-finals
2	Tadamon Sour	2	1	1	0	4	3	+1	4	Qualification for the semi-finals
3	Nejmeh	2	0	0	2	2	5	−3	0	

Source: Global Sports Archive
27 July 2022
17:00 UTC+3

Nejmeh	1–2	Tadamon Sour
Chaito 55' (pen.)	Report	Salloum 78'; Sarriyeh 90+4'

Amin Abdelnour Stadium, Bhamdoun
Referee: Ali Chamas

2 August 2022
17:00 UTC+3

Nejmeh	1–3	Ansar
El Zein 45'	Report	Tall 26'; Al Haj 35'; Maatouk 38'

Tripoli Municipal Stadium, Tripoli
Referee: Maher Al Ali

8 August 2022
17:00 UTC+3

Tadamon Sour	2–2	Ansar
Melhem 17'; Mansour 39' (pen.)	Report	Darwich 80'; Ali 90+3'

Amin Abdelnour Stadium, Bhamdoun
Referee: Ali Chamas

== Final stage ==
Semi-finals; 14 August 2022
Ahed	2
Tadamon Sour	1
Shabab Sahel	0
Ansar	3

Final; 20 August 2022
Ahed	2
Ansar	1

=== Semi-finals ===
14 August 2022
16:30 UTC+3

Ahed	2–1	Tadamon Sour
Siblini 56'; Kadiri 86'	Report	Melhem 3'

Ansar Stadium, Ansar
Referee: Mohamad Issa

14 August 2022
16:30 UTC+3

Shabab Sahel	0–3	Ansar
	Report	Mohssen 5'; Tall 77', 86'

Amin Abdelnour Stadium, Bhamdoun
Referee: Ali Reda

=== Final ===
20 August 2022
16:30 UTC+3

Ahed	2–1	Ansar
Nasser 26'; Ataya 60'	Report	Maatouk 35' (pen.)

Amin Abdelnour Stadium, Bhamdoun
Referee: Hussein Abo Yehia
