= 2018–19 Lebanese Premier League =

Lebanese Premier League
- Season: 2018–19
- Dates: 21 September 2018 – 21 April 2019
- Champions: Ahed; 7th title
- Relegated: Bekaa; Racing Beirut
- AFC Cup: Ahed; Ansar
- Matches: 132
- Goals: 315 (2.39 per match)
- Top goalscorer: El Hadji Malick Tall (19 goals) (Note: El Hadji Malick Tall's first goal against Shabab Sahel on 14 December 2018 was later changed to a Bakary Coulibaly own goal by the referee.)
- Best goalkeeper: Mehdi Khalil (16 clean sheets)
- Biggest home win: Ahed 6–0 Safa (23 September 2018)
- Biggest away win: Akhaa Ahli 1–6 Ahed (6 April 2019)
- Highest scoring: Salam Zgharta 2–6 Ansar (7 December 2018); Shabab Sahel 5–3 Bekaa (13 April 2019)
- Longest winning run: 16 matches Ahed
- Longest unbeaten run: 20 matches Ahed
- Longest winless run: 12 matches Bekaa
- Longest losing run: 7 matches Bekaa

The 2018–19 Lebanese Premier League season, officially known as the Alfa Lebanese Football League (Arabic: دوري ألفا اللبناني لكرة القدم) for sponsorship reasons, began on 21 September 2018 and concluded on 21 April 2019. 2018–19 was the 58th season of the Lebanese Premier League, the top Lebanese professional league for association football clubs in the country, established in 1934.

Ahed were the defending champions. Shabab Sahel and Chabab Ghazieh joined as the promoted clubs from the 2017–18 Lebanese Second Division. They replaced Shabab Arabi and Islah who were relegated to the 2018–19 Lebanese Second Division. Ahed won their third consecutive Lebanese Premier League title, and seventh overall, with two games to spare.

== Summary ==
=== Issues ===
The 2018–19 season was one of the worst for Lebanese football since the Lebanese Civil War for various issues.

The first issue was the poor preparation and management of most clubs. Nejmeh had changed their head coach twice and bought five of ten summer signings only in the last week of the transfer window. Ansar changed their coach a week before the season began and signed two players in the last days of the transfer window. The league's smaller clubs had other problems. Tadamon Sour found themselves without a head coach or president at the start of the season. Tripoli also began the season without a head coach, as well as having not signed any new players. Nabi Chit SC changed their name to Bekaa SC in a failed attempt to attract more investors. Overall, only five of twelve teams kept their manager from the previous season, and most summer acquisitions were concluded in the final days of the signing window.

The second issue concerned the tensions between the Lebanese Football Association (LFA) and the clubs, with the referees' performances being the hot topic. Clubs like Ansar and Nejmeh protested to the Federation, threatening to leave the league if no improvements were to be made. These tensions culminated with the resignation of Semaan Douaihy, a member of the Executive Committee of the LFA. Salam Zgharta FC and Racing Beirut announcing their withdrawal from all LFA-managed competitions.

The final issue the league faced was the re-emergence of match-fixing. While the LFA proved its existence, it made no effort to punish the parties involved or to cancel the results of the implicated teams.

=== League summary ===
Al Ahed FC won their third consecutive title with a ten-point margin. The battle for second place went down to the wire, with Ansar claiming an AFC Cup spot from Nejmeh in the last matchday of the league. The relegation battle was also determined on the last matchday, with eight of the 12 teams all candidates for relegation. The Beirut Municipal Stadium and the Fouad Chehab Stadium returned to host Lebanese Premier League matches.

== Teams ==
=== Stadiums and locations ===
Prior to the start of each season, every team chooses two stadiums as their home venues. In case both stadiums are unavailable for a certain matchday, another venue is used.

Locations of teams in the 2018–19 Lebanese Premier League
Locations of teams in the 2018–19 Lebanese Premier League within Beirut

Team	Home city	Stadium	Capacity	2017–18 season
Ahed	Beirut	Various		1st in the Lebanese Premier League
Akhaa Ahli	Aley	Amin Abdelnour Stadium	3,500	5th in the Lebanese Premier League
Ansar	Beirut	Various		4th in the Lebanese Premier League
Bekaa	Al-Nabi Shayth	Nabi Chit Stadium	5,000	10th in the Lebanese Premier League
Chabab Ghazieh	Ghazieh	Kfarjoz Stadium		2nd in the Lebanese Second Division
Nejmeh	Beirut	Various		2nd in the Lebanese Premier League
Racing Beirut	Beirut	Fouad Chehab Stadium	5,000	9th in the Lebanese Premier League
Safa	Beirut	Various		3rd in the Lebanese Premier League
Salam Zgharta	Zgharta	Zgharta Stadium	3,500	6th in the Lebanese Premier League
Shabab Sahel	Beirut	Various		1st in the Lebanese Second Division
Tadamon Sour	Tyre	Sour Stadium	6,500	7th in the Lebanese Premier League
Tripoli	Tripoli	Tripoli Municipal Stadium	22,000	8th in the Lebanese Premier League

== League table ==
Pos	Team	Pld	W	D	L	GF	GA	GD	Pts	Qualification or relegation
1	Ahed (C)	22	19	2	1	40	9	+31	59	Qualification for 2020 and 2021 AFC Cup group stage (Note: Since league champions Ahed were also Lebanese FA Cup winners, the league runners-up qualified for the AFC Cup group stage. Due to the COVID-19 pandemic in Lebanon, the 2019–20 Lebanese Premier League and the 2019–20 Lebanese FA Cup were cancelled and declared null and void by the Lebanese Football Association (the competitions were previously suspended due to domestic issues including protests and financial problems). Therefore, Ahed and Ansar qualified to both the 2020 and 2021 AFC Cup group stage.)
2	Ansar	22	15	4	3	53	18	+35	49	Qualification for 2020 and 2021 AFC Cup group stage
3	Nejmeh	22	15	3	4	36	17	+19	48	
4	Akhaa Ahli	22	10	3	9	28	32	−4	33	
5	Shabab Sahel	22	8	4	10	32	32	0	28	
6	Chabab Ghazieh	22	6	6	10	24	31	−7	24	
7	Tadamon Sour	22	5	8	9	16	21	−5	23 (Note: Head-to-head results: Tadamon Sour 0–0 Tripoli, Tripoli 0–0 Tadamon Sour.)	
8	Tripoli	22	5	8	9	14	26	−12	23	
9	Salam Zgharta	22	5	7	10	15	30	−15	22 (Note: Head-to-head results: Salam Zgharta 0–0 Safa, Safa 0–1 Salam Zgharta.)	
10	Safa	22	5	7	10	16	29	−13	22	
11	Racing Beirut (R)	22	5	6	11	22	32	−10	21	Relegation to Lebanese Second Division
12	Bekaa (R)	22	3	4	15	19	38	−19	13	Relegation to Lebanese Second Division

Source: Goalzz
Rules for classification: 1) Points; 2) Head-to-head points; 3) Head-to-head goal difference; 4) Goal difference; 5) Goals scored; 6) Draw.
(C) Champions; (R) Relegated

== Season statistics ==
=== Top goalscorers ===
Rank	Player	Club	Goals	Appearances
1	(Senegal) El Hadji Malick Tall	Ansar	19	20
2	(Lebanon) Ahmad Hijazi	Akhaa Ahli	11	19
3	(Bulgaria) Martin Toshev	Ahed	10	14
4	(Lebanon) Ali Alaaeddine	Nejmeh	9	19
4	(Senegal) Abdou Aziz Ndiaye	Shabab Sahel	9	19
6	(Lebanon) Hassan Maatouk	Nejmeh	7	19
6	(Ghana) Stephen Kwadwo Sarfo	Tadamon Sour	7	20
6	(Ivory Coast) Jean Christian Keke	Chabab Ghazieh	7	21
6	(Brazil) Carlos Alberto	Akhaa Ahli	7	22
6	(Lebanon) Moni	Ansar	7	22
