= List of Lebanese people in Saudi Arabia =

The list includes:

- Ahmad El Choum, Lebanese footballer
- Sami El Choum, Lebanese footballer
- Bahaa Hariri, Lebanese-Saudi billionaire
- Rafic Hariri, Lebanese-Saudi business tycoon and the Prime Minister of Lebanon from 1992 to 1998 and again from 2000 until his resignation on 20 October 2004.
- Saad Hariri, Lebanese-Saudi billionaire who served as the Prime Minister of Lebanon from 2009 until 2011.
- Ahmed Al Khodor, Lebanese footballer
- Ahmed Naamani, Lebanese footballer
- Mona Al Solh, former wife Prince Talal and mother of Al-Waleed bin Talal.
- Al-Waleed bin Talal, business magnate and investor. He is a member of the Saudi royal family

== See also ==
- List of Lebanese people
- List of Lebanese people (Diaspora)
- Lebanese people in Saudi Arabia
