= Qaaqaaiyet El Snoubar =

Qaaqaaiyet El Snoubar قاقعية الصنوبر
- Municipality
- Location in Lebanon
- Coordinates: 33°25′51″N 35°20′40″E
- Country: Lebanon
- Governorate: South Governorate
- District: Sidon District

Area
  - Total: 3.5 km^{2} (1.4 sq mi)
- Elevation: 220 m (720 ft)

Population (2014)
  - Total: 3,000
  - Density: 860/km^{2} (2,200/sq mi)
- Time zone: UTC+2 (EET)
  - Summer (DST): UTC+3 (EEST)
- Website: www.sanoubar.com

Qaaqaaiyet El Snoubar (Arabic: قاقعية الصنوبر, also spelled Qaqaaiyat as-Sanawbar, Kakaiyat Sanawbar, or Kaakayat Al Sanawbar) is a municipality in Sidon District, South Governorate, Lebanon. It is located southeast of Sidon, and is considered an "extension" of the villages of Jabal Amel. The population is of about 3,000 inhabitants.

== Name ==
Qaaqaaiyet (Arabic: قاقعية) derives from Muhammad bin Hassan Al-Qaiq (Arabic: حمد بن حسن القعيق), while El Snoubar (Arabic: الصنوبر) is Arabic for "the pine", a common tree in the village, which is harvested for its pine nuts.

== Demographics ==
In 2014, Muslims made up 99.82% of registered voters in Qaaqaaiyet El Snoubar. 99.02% of the voters were Shiite Muslims.

== Notable people ==
The village contains the locally revered tomb of Sheikh Muhammad bin Hassan Al-Qa’iq.

Abbas Assi, a Lebanese international footballer, was born in Qaaqaaiyet El Snoubar.
