= Abbas Assi =

Lebanese footballer (born 1995)

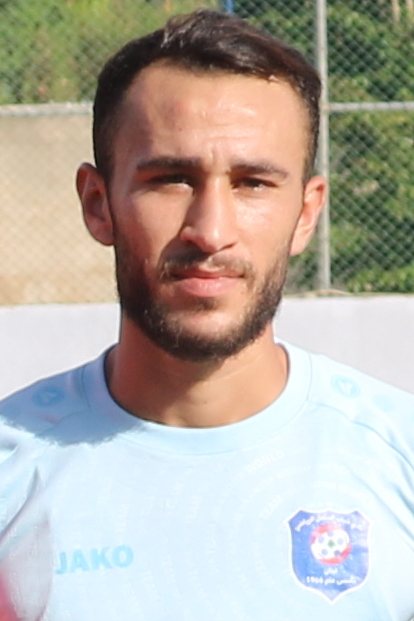
- Assi with Shabab Sahel in 2021

Personal information
- Full name: Abbas Ibrahim Assi
- Date of birth: 9 July 1995 (age 31)
- Place of birth: Qaaqaaiyet El Snoubar, Lebanon
- Height: 1.76 m (5 ft 9 in)
- Positions: Midfielder; right-back

Youth career
- 2012–2014: Shabab Sahel

Senior career*
Years	Team	Apps	(Gls)
2014–2024	Shabab Sahel	97	(6)
2022	→ Naft Maysan (loan)	4	(0)
2024–2026	Safa	31	(0)

International career^{‡}
2017	Lebanon U23	1	(0)
2014–2022	Lebanon	13	(0)
- * Club domestic league appearances and goals as of 28 June 2026 ‡ National team caps and goals as of 24 March 2024

Abbas Ibrahim Assi (Arabic: عباس ابراهيم عاصي; born 9 July 1995) is a Lebanese footballer who plays as a midfielder or right-back.

Assi began his senior career at Shabab Sahel in 2014, and was loaned out to Naft Maysan in Iraq in 2022. After suffering an injury that kept him sidelined for two years, Assi returned to football and signed for Safa in 2024, remaining until 2026. At the international level, Assi made his debut for the Lebanon national team in 2014, and participated in the 2021 FIFA Arab Cup.

== Club career ==
=== Shabab Sahel ===
==== 2014–2022: Early career ====
Assi made his senior debut for Shabab Sahel in 2014. He featured in the 2016 Lebanese Elite Cup.

During the 2020–21 season, Assi scored in the club's 5–3 league victory over Bekaa in September 2020. In October, he scored the winning goal in a 1–0 victory over Tadamon Sour, and was named man of the match. After scoring three goals in the league's first four matches, he was also among the competition's leading scorers as a defender.

==== 2022: Loan to Naft Maysan ====
On 8 January 2022, Assi joined Iraqi Premier League side Naft Maysan on a six-month loan from Shabab Sahel. He made his debut on 8 February, coming on as a half-time substitute in a 1–1 draw against Al-Naft.

==== 2022–2024: Injury ====
Assi suffered a severe injury to his right foot in May that ended his season prematurely, forcing him to return to Lebanon to undergo surgery. As the initial surgery was not successful, he underwent a second – successful – surgery in October which extended his return a further three months. Assi completed his treatment in January 2023, and was due to return the following month for the second half of the 2022–23 season with Sahel. However, in May, Sahel announced that Assi would leave for Doha, Qatar to continue his treatment for his ankle injury.

=== Safa ===
In May 2024, Assi signed for Safa on a free transfer. After participating in most games for Safa throughout the 2024–25 and 2025–26 seasons, Assi left the club in summer 2026 on mutual terms.

== International career ==
Assi made his international debut for Lebanon on 6 November 2014, coming on as a substitute in a 3–2 friendly defeat to the United Arab Emirates.

Assi was included in Lebanon's squad for a training camp in Dubai in November 2020. He was called up for the 2022 FIFA World Cup qualification matches in June, and was subsequently included in the squad for the 2021 FIFA Arab Cup in Qatar.

== Style of play ==
Mainly used as a central midfielder, Assi has also been deployed as a right-back.

== Career statistics ==
=== International ===
As of match played 24 March 2022

Appearances and goals by national team and year
National team	Year	Apps	Goals
Lebanon	2014	1	0
Lebanon	2015	0	0
Lebanon	2016	0	0
Lebanon	2017	0	0
Lebanon	2018	0	0
Lebanon	2019	0	0
Lebanon	2020	0	0
Lebanon	2021	9	0
Lebanon	2022	3	0
Total		13	0

== Honours ==
Shabab Sahel

- Lebanese Elite Cup: 2019
- Lebanese Challenge Cup: 2014, 2015
- Lebanese Second Division: 2017–18
