= Zouhair Abdallah =

Lebanese footballer (born 1983)

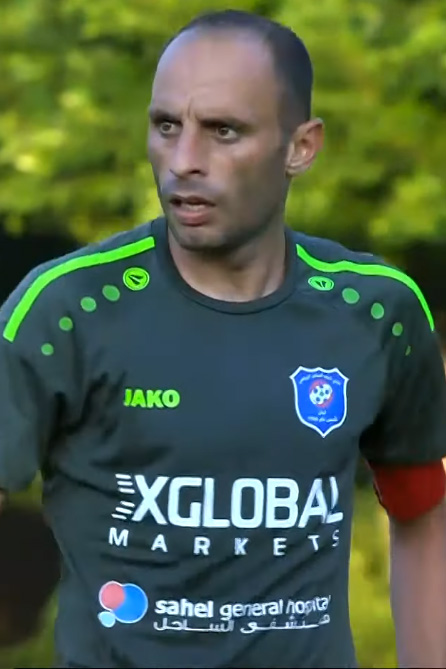
- Abdallah with Shabab Sahel in 2019

Personal information
- Full name: Zouhair Ahmad Abdallah
- Date of birth: 5 June 1983 (age 43)
- Place of birth: Bint Jbeil, Lebanon
- Height: 1.75 m (5 ft 9 in)
- Position: Defender

Senior career*
Years	Team	Apps	(Gls)
2004–2023	Shabab Sahel	160+	(3+)
Total		160+	(3+)

International career
2011	Lebanon	2	(0)
- * Club domestic league appearances and goals

Zouhair Ahmad Abdallah (Arabic: زُهَيْر أَحْمَد عَبْد الله; born 5 May 1983) is a Lebanese former footballer who played as a defender.

Abdallah played his entire senior career at Shabab Sahel, between 2004 and 2023. He played twice for the Lebanon national team in 2011: a friendly against Oman, and a 2014 World Cup qualifier against Bangladesh.

== Club career ==
Abdallah began his senior career with Shabab Sahel in 2004, playing his first match against Nejmeh at the Bourj Hammoud Stadium.

== International career ==
Abdallah was first called up to the Lebanon national team in 2010, and took part in training ahead of two games against Bangladesh without playing. He eventually made his international debut on 9 July 2011, in a friendly game against Oman; the match ended in a 1–0 home defeat. Abdallah's second, and final, game for Lebanon came on 28 July 2011, in a 2–0 defeat to Bangladesh in a 2014 FIFA World Cup qualifier match.

== Style of play ==
Starting out as a right-back, Abdallah moved to centre-back later on in his career.

== Honours ==
Shabab Sahel

- Lebanese Elite Cup: 2019
- Lebanese Challenge Cup: 2014, 2015
- Lebanese Second Division: 2005–06, 2017–18
- Lebanese FA Cup runner-up: 2008–09, 2012–13
- Lebanese Super Cup runner-up: 2013
