= Khaled Mohssen =

Footballer (born 1998)

Personal information
- Full name: Khaled Mohamad Mohssen
- Date of birth: 10 January 1998 (age 28)
- Place of birth: Hamburg, Germany
- Height: 1.76 m (5 ft 9 in)
- Position: Midfielder

Youth career
- –2009: Einigkeit Wilhelmsburg
- 2009–2017: Hamburger SV

Senior career*
Years	Team	Apps	(Gls)
2017–2020	Hamburger SV II	52	(5)
2020–2021	Phönix Lübeck	1	(0)
2021–2023	Ansar	11	(0)
Total		64	(5)

International career
2020	Lebanon	1	(0)
- * Club domestic league appearances and goals

Khaled Mohamad Mohssen (Arabic: خالد محمد محسن; born 10 January 1998) is a former footballer who played as a midfielder. Born in Germany, he played for the Lebanon national team.

== Club career ==
=== Hamburger SV ===
Mohssen represented Hamburger SV at under-15, under-17, and under-19 levels. He made 59 appearances in the Under 19 Bundesliga, scoring six goals and providing four assists. Mohssen also captained the reserve team, Regionalliga side Hamburger SV II, scoring five goals in 52 games.

=== Phönix Lübeck ===
On 30 September 2020, Mohssen moved to newly promoted Regionalliga side Phönix Lübeck on a free transfer. Due to the COVID-19 pandemic, the league was suspended in November 2020, with Mohssen only playing one league game; he left the club following the expiration of his contract in summer 2021.

=== Ansar ===
Mohssen joined Lebanese Premier League side Ansar on 27 November 2021.

== International career ==
Born in Germany, Mohssen is of Lebanese descent. He made his debut for the Lebanon national team in a 3–1 friendly defeat to Bahrain on 12 November 2020.

== Career statistics ==
=== Club ===
As of match played 29 April 2022

Appearances and goals by club, season and competition
Club	Season	League			National cup (Note: Includes DFB-Pokal, Lebanese FA Cup)		League cup (Note: Includes Lebanese Elite Cup)		Continental		Other		Total	
Club	Season	Division	Apps	Goals	Apps	Goals	Apps	Goals	Apps	Goals	Apps	Goals	Apps	Goals
Hamburger SV II	2017–18	Regionalliga Nord	7	0	—		—		—		—		7	0
Hamburger SV II	2018–19	Regionalliga Nord	25	2	—		—		—		—		25	2
Hamburger SV II	2019–20	Regionalliga Nord	20	3	—		—		—		—		20	3
Hamburger SV II	Total		52	5	0	0	0	0	0	0	0	0	52	5
Phönix Lübeck	2020–21	Regionalliga Nord	1	0	—		—		—		1 (Note: Appearance in Schleswig-Holstein Cup)	0	2	0
Ansar	2021–22	Lebanese Premier League	4	0	0	0	—		0	0	—		4	0
Career total			57	5	0	0	0	0	0	0	1	0	58	5

=== International ===
As of match played 12 November 2020

Appearances and goals by national team and year
National team	Year	Apps	Goals
Lebanon	2020	1	0
Total		1	0

== Honours ==
Ansar

- Lebanese FA Cup runner-up: 2021–22
- Lebanese Elite Cup runner-up: 2022

== See also ==
- List of Lebanon international footballers born outside Lebanon
