= 2023–24 Lebanese Second Division =

Lebanese Second Division
- Season: 2023–24
- Dates: 4 August 2023 – 24 February 2024
- Champions: Riyadi Abbasiyah
- Promoted: Riyadi Abbasiyah; Shabab Baalbek
- Relegated: Islah Borj Shmali; Ijtimaii
- Matches: 105
- Goals: 251 (2.39 per match)
- Top goalscorer: Pemaza; Wasim Abdalhadi (13 goals each)

The Lebanese Second Division (Arabic: الدوري اللبناني الدرجة الثانية) is the second division of Lebanese football. It is controlled by the Lebanese Football Association. The top two teams are promoted to the Lebanese Premier League, while the bottom teams are relegated to the Lebanese Third Division.

== Summary ==
The league was played between 4 August 2023 and 24 February 2024. Riyadi Abbasiyah won the league for the first time, while Shabab Baalbek finished second; both were promoted to the Lebanese Premier League. Riyadi Abbasiyah secured the title and promotion on 18 February with a 2–1 victory over Mabarra, achieving promotion to the top flight for the first time in the club's history. Ijtimaii finished bottom of the relegation round and were relegated to the Lebanese Third Division. Islah Borj Shmali withdrew from the competition without playing a match. Pemaza and Wasim Abdalhadi were the joint top scorers with 13 goals each.

The season was played in two phases. In the first phase, the 11 active teams played each other once. The league was then divided into a promotion round for the top six teams and a relegation round for the remaining five teams. The results from the first phase were carried over into the second phase, with half of each team's points from the first phase carried over, rounded upwards. The six teams in the promotion round played each other twice, while the five teams in the relegation round also played each other twice.

== League table ==
Pos	Team	Pld	W	D	L	GF	GA	GD	Pts	Promotion or relegation (Note: Teams played each other once (11 matches), before the league was split into two groups (the top six and the bottom six). Teams in the promotion group played each other twice (10 matches), while teams in the relegation group played each other twice (8 matches). Teams carried over half their point tally from the first phase into the second phase.)
1	Riyadi Abbasiyah (C, P)	20	13	4	3	24	10	+14	32	Promotion to Lebanese Premier League
2	Shabab Baalbek (P)	20	11	4	5	33	16	+17	29	Promotion to Lebanese Premier League
3	Mabarra	20	9	8	3	28	20	+8	27	
4	Bint Jbeil	20	8	7	5	39	26	+13	22	
5	Wehda Saadnayel	20	4	9	7	19	24	−5	14	
6	Akhaa Ahli Aley	20	5	5	10	19	31	−12	13	
7	Salam Zgharta	18	8	6	4	28	18	+10	23	
8	BFA Sporting	18	4	6	8	21	30	−9	14 (Note: Head-to-head points: BFA Sporting 12, Irshad Chhim 7, Nahda Barelias 3.)	
9	Irshad Chehim	18	4	7	7	22	20	+2	14	
10	Nahda Barelias	18	3	7	8	10	22	−12	14	
11	Ijtimaii (R)	18	2	5	11	8	34	−26	9	Relegation to Lebanese Third Division
12	Islah Borj Shmali (Note: Islah Borj Shmali withdrew and did not play a match.) (R)	0	0	0	0	0	0	0	0	Withdraw

Source: Global Sports Archive
Rules for classification: 1) Points; 2) Head-to-head points; 3) Head-to-head goal difference; 4) Goal difference; 5) Goals scored; 6) Draw.
(C) Champions; (P) Promoted; (R) Relegated

== Goalscorers ==
Rank	Player	Club	Goals
1	(Brazil) Pemaza	Salam Zgharta	13
1	(Palestine) Wasim Abdalhadi	Jwaya	13
3	(Senegal) Idrissa Cisse	Shabab Baalbek	12
4	(Nigeria) Samuel Agba	Mabarra	10
4	(Lebanon) Mohamad Jawad Abou Khalil	Riyadi Abbasiyah	10
6	(Ghana) Bismark Asante	Jwaya	9
7	(Nigeria) Samuel Afolabi	Irshad Chehim	7
8	(Lebanon) Ali Bazzi	BFA Sporting	6
8	(Nigeria) Collins Anigbo	BFA Sporting	6
10	(Lebanon) Hussein Outa	Shabab Baalbek	5
10	(Lebanon) Mohammad Jawad	Jwaya	5
10	(Palestine) Omar Meshlawi	BFA Sporting	5
