= Al Riyadi Al Abbasiyah Club =

Lebanese association football club

Riyadi Abbasiyah
- Full name: Al Riyadi Al Abbasiyah Club
- Founded: 1989; 37 years ago
- Ground: Abbas Kazem Nasser Stadium
- Capacity: 1,000
- Chairman: Habib Ajami
- Manager: Hassan Sweidan
- League: Lebanese Premier League
- 2025–26: Lebanese Premier League, 9th of 12
Home colours	Away colours

Al Riyadi Al Abbasiyah Club (Arabic: نادي الرياضي العباسية, lit. 'Abbasiyah Sporting Club') is a football club based in Abbassiyeh, Lebanon, that competes in the Lebanese Premier League.

== History ==
On 13 February 2022, Riyadi Abbasiyah won the 2021–22 Lebanese Third Division title after accumulating seven points in the four-team playoff; the final match of the playoff ended in a 0–0 draw between Riyadi Abbasiyah and Bint Jbeil. On 18 February 2024, Riyadi Abbasiyah secured a 2–1 victory over Mabarra, a result that confirmed their first-place finish in the 2023–24 Lebanese Second Division after only two seasons in the Second Division. With this win, the club achieved promotion to the Lebanese Premier League for the first time in its history.

== Players ==
As of 6 November 2026

Note: Flags indicate national team as defined under FIFA eligibility rules; some limited exceptions apply. Players may hold more than one non-FIFA nationality.

No.	Pos.	Nation	Player
1	GK	LBN	Ahmad Moghnieh
2	DF	LBN	Sajed Amhaz
3	DF	LBN	Hassan Bitar
4	DF	LBN	Hussein Fahes
5	MF	LBN	Ali Alakbar Mannaa
6	MF	SSD	Joseph Loro
7	FW	LBN	Sadek Farhat
8	MF	LBN	Ali Kharoubi
9	FW	TOG	Christophe Folly-Klan
10	MF	LBN	Mahdi Fahs
11	FW	SEN	Baba Cissé
12	DF	LBN	Hussein Kaawar
13	GK	LBN	Mohammad Karaki
15	DF	MLI	Ichaka Diarra

No.	Pos.	Nation	Player
16	DF	LBN	Hussein Nasrallah
17	MF	LBN	Mahmoud Kaawar
20	FW	LBN	Akram Trad
21	MF	LBN	Ibrahim Hammoudi
22	MF	LBN	Ibrahim Mhana
23	GK	LBN	Karim Salame
30	MF	LBN	Fadel Ajami
33		GHA	Stephen Asare
77	GK	LBN	Ahmad Manaa
90	FW	LBN	Khaled Sati
99	MF	GHA	Samuel Bayitse
—	FW	LBN	Ali Selman
—		GHA	Abbon Goodfred
—		GHA	Yussif Rashid

== Honours ==
- Lebanese Second Division
  - Winners (1): 2023–24
- Lebanese Third Division
  - Winners (1): 2021–22
