= Mohamad Kdouh (footballer, born 1993) =

Lebanese footballer (born 1993)

Personal information
- Full name: Mohamad Mahmoud Kdouh
- Date of birth: 4 May 1993 (age 33)
- Place of birth: Beirut, Lebanon
- Height: 1.81 m (5 ft 11 in)
- Positions: Attacking midfielder; forward

Youth career
- 2005–2010: Nejmeh

Senior career*
Years	Team	Apps	(Gls)
2010–2013	Nejmeh	16	(5)
2013–2015	Sūduva	36	(11)
2015	Ilves	7	(1)
2015–2016	Vllaznia Shkodër	4	(0)
2016	Persela Lamongan	1	(0)
2017	Safa	12	(1)
2017–2018	Shabab Arabi	15	(3)
2018–2019	Bekaa	14	(1)
2019–2020	Shabab Bourj	0	(0)
2020–2021	Racing Beirut	16	(15)
2021–2022	NEROCA	9	(2)
2022	Victory	4	(3)
2022–2023	Bengaluru United	15	(12)
2023	Himalayan Sherpa Club	2	(0)
2023–2025	Racing Beirut	15	(0)
Total		166	(54)

International career
2007	Lebanon U16	5	(2)
2011	Lebanon U19	4	(0)
2013	Lebanon	2	(0)
- * Club domestic league appearances and goals

Mohamad Mahmoud Kdouh (Arabic: محمد محمود قدوح, Lebanese Arabic pronunciation: [mˈħammad ʔduːħ]; born 4 May 1993) is a Lebanese former professional footballer who played as an attacking midfielder or forward.

== Club career ==
=== Nejmeh and experience abroad ===
Coming through the youth system, Kdouh started his career in 2010 at Nejmeh in Lebanon. In 2013, he signed for Lithuanian club FK Sūduva, before moving to Finland at FC Ilves in 2015. Kdouh moved to Albanian club Vllaznia Shkodër in August, leaving in December due to financial issues with the club. On 1 April 2016, he moved to Persela Lamongan in Indonesia.

=== Return to Lebanon ===
Kdouh returned to Lebanon mid-2016–17 season, signing for Safa. He moved to Shabab Arabi on 6 June 2017, before joining Bekaa in 2018. In 2019, Kdouh moved to Shabab Bourj, then to Lebanese Second Division side Racing Beirut ahead of the 2020–21 season. He scored 15 goals, and was the season top goalscorer.

=== India, the Maldives and Nepal ===
On 15 August 2021, Kdouh moved to I-League side NEROCA. He made his debut on 27 December, in a 3–2 win against Sreenidi Deccan. Kdouh scored his first goal on 7 March 2022, helping his side beat TRAU 2–0 in the Imphal derby.

Following the expiration of his contract with NEROCA in April 2022, Kdouh joined Victory in the Maldivian Second Division on 16 July 2022 for one month; he scored a bicycle kick on his debut the same day, to help his side win against BG Sports.

In August 2022, Kdouh moved back to India, signing with I-League 2nd Division side Bengaluru United. He played two games for Himalayan Sherpa Club in the Martyr's Memorial A-Division League between March and April 2023.

=== Return to Racing Beirut ===
On 19 June 2023, Kdouh moved back to Lebanon, returning to newly promoted Lebanese Premier League side Racing Beirut. On 7 July 2023, Kdouh scored a hat-trick against Ansar in a 4–3 win in the 2023 Lebanese Federation Cup.

== International career ==
Kdouh made his senior international debut for Lebanon on 26 December 2013, as an 87th-minute substitute against Jordan in the 2013 WAFF Championship.

== Honours ==
Nejmeh

- Lebanese FA Cup runner-up: 2011–12

Safa

- Lebanese FA Cup runner-up: 2016–17

Individual

- Lebanese Second Division top goalscorer: 2020–21
