= Abbassiyeh =

Abbassiyeh العباسيّة Al-Aabbassiyah
- Municipality
- Location within Lebanon
- Coordinates: 33°17′55″N 35°16′59″E
- Grid position: 107/151 L
- Country: Lebanon
- Governorate: South Governorate
- District: Tyre

Area
  - Land: 6.8 sq mi (18 km^{2})
- Elevation: 560 ft (170 m)
- Time zone: GMT +3

Abbassiyeh (Arabic: العباسيّة, romanized: al-ʿAbbāssiyyah), also spelled Abbassieh, is a municipality in the Tyre District of South Lebanon.

== Etymology ==
According to E. H. Palmer in 1881, the name Aabbassiyah came from the proper name ‘Abbâs, the son of Ali ibn Abi Talib.

== Location ==
Abbassiyeh is located in the South Governorate, Tyre District. It is 150 m above sea level and 84 kilometers to the southwest of Beirut, the capital city of Lebanon, and 14 km from the center of its district Tyre.

== History ==
In 1875, Victor Guérin estimated the population to be 600 Metawileh.

In 1881, the PEF's Survey of Western Palestine (SWP) described it as: "A stone-built village, containing 400 Metawileh, built on a ridge, the ground around it is cultivated for barley, etc., and there are groves of figs and olives. The water supply is derived from a large pool to the north, and a good spring built up with masonry, also to the north of the village; there are no antiquities, and only a few cisterns."

== Demographics ==
In 2014 Muslims made up 98.86% of registered voters in Abbassiyeh. 98.58% of the voters were Shiite Muslims.

== Notable people ==
- Houssein Rizk (born 1997), Lebanese footballer

== Bibliography ==
- Conder, C.R.; Kitchener, H.H. (1881). The Survey of Western Palestine: Memoirs of the Topography, Orography, Hydrography, and Archaeology. Vol. 1. London: Committee of the Palestine Exploration Fund.
- Guérin, V. (1880). Description Géographique Historique et Archéologique de la Palestine (in French). Vol. 3: Galilee, pt. 2. Paris: L'Imprimerie Nationale.
- Palmer, E.H. (1881). The Survey of Western Palestine: Arabic and English Name Lists Collected During the Survey by Lieutenants Conder and Kitchener, R. E. Transliterated and Explained by E.H. Palmer. Committee of the Palestine Exploration Fund.
