= 2006–07 Lebanese Premier League =

Lebanese Premier League
- Season: 2006–07
- Champions: Al-Ansar
- Runner up: Safa
- Relegated: Al Rayyan; Salam Zgharta
- Goals: 317
- Top goalscorer: Mohammed Ghaddar (15)
- Biggest home win: Al-Ansar 9–2 Salam Zgharta (2007-04-18)
- Biggest away win: Al Rayyan 0–6 Safa (2006-10-17)
- Highest scoring: Al-Hikma 1–8 Nejmeh (2008-12-16)

The Lebanese Premier League 2006–07 season was the 46th season in the Lebanese Premier League. Al-Ansar won the 13th and so far latest title in the Lebanese Premier League by flying to the end of the season, 4 points clear of the nearest team, Safa Sporting Club and winning 2 consecutive titles.

== Final table ==
Pos	Team	Pld	W	D	L	GF	GA	GD	Pts	Qualification or relegation
1	Al-Ansar	22	15	4	3	42	24	+18	49	2008 AFC Cup Group Stage and Arab Champions League
2	Safa	22	13	6	3	47	16	+31	45	2008 AFC Cup
3	Al-Mabarra	22	12	3	7	31	17	+14	39	
4	Nejmeh	22	10	6	6	51	22	+29	36	
5	Al-Ahed	22	9	9	4	43	23	+20	36	
6	Hekmeh	22	10	5	7	39	32	+7	35	
7	Al-Ahli Sidon	22	5	9	8	25	27	−2	24	
8	Al-Sahel	22	6	6	10	24	37	−13	24	
9	Tyre	22	5	9	8	20	34	−14	24	
10	Tripoli SC	22	5	7	10	27	33	−6	22	
11	Al Rayyan	22	5	7	10	21	45	−24	22	Relegation to Lebanese Second Division
12	Salam Zgharta	22	0	3	19	8	68	−60	−3 (Note: Salem Zghart had 6 points taken away for not playing in Round 2)	Relegation to Lebanese Second Division

== Relegation and promotion ==
=== Relegation to 2nd Division ===
- Al Rayyan(Finished 2nd Last)
- Salam Zgharta(Finished Last)

=== Promotion to Lebanese Premier League ===
- Racing Beirut(Won 2nd Division)
- Al-Irshad(Won Promotion Play-off)
