= Antranik Youth Association (football) =

Lebanese-Armenian association football club

Antranik
- Full name: Antranik Youth Association
- Short name: AYA
- Founded: 1931; 95 years ago
- Ground: AGBU-AYA Field; Naccache, Antelias, Lebanon
- Website: agbulebanon.org
| Home colours | Away colours |

The Antranik Youth Association (AYA) (Arabic: جمعية شباب الأنترانيك; Western Armenian: Անդրանիկ Երիտասարդաց Ընկերակցութիւն), or simply Antranik (Arabic: الأنترانيك; Western Armenian: Անդրանիկ), is a football club based in Antelias, Lebanon. The club was founded in 1931 as the football section of the Antranik Youth Association, the Lebanese chapter of the Armenian Youth Association.

== History ==
With the establishment of Antranik Youth Association in 1931, Antranik formed its football team. The team, represented by Shavarsh Pakrian, participated in the Lebanese Football Association's first meeting on 22 March 1933, as one of its founding members. In 1940–41, Antranik's reserve team – Antranik B – won the Lebanese Second Division with 15 wins and one draw.

In the 2020–21 season, Antranik's football team finished second in the Lebanese Fourth Division Beirut group, qualifying for the general finals; they finished second in their group, and were promoted to the Lebanese Third Division.

== Honours ==
- Lebanese Second Division
  - Winners (1): 1940–41 (Note: As "Antranik B")
