= Al Fajr SC Arabsalim =

Lebanese football club

Fajr Arabsalim
- Full name: Al Fajr Sporting Club Arabsalim
- Founded: 1987; 39 years ago, as Al Fajr SC Zefta; 2000; 26 years ago, as Al Fajr SC Arabsalim
- Ground: Hussein Saadeh Stadium
- Chairman: Mustafa Mohammad Haidar
- League: Lebanese Fourth Division
- 2025–26: Lebanese Fourth Division South – Group C, 4th of 7
Home colours	Away colours

Al Fajr Sporting Club Arabsalim (Arabic: نادي الفجر الرياضي عربصاليم, lit. 'Dawn Sports Club Arabsalim') is a football club based in Arabsalim, Nabatieh, Lebanon.

== History ==
=== Fajr Zefta ===
Founded in Zefta in 1987 as Al Fajr SC Zefta, the club took part in the Lebanese Second Division between 1993–94 and 1997–1998, when they were relegated to the Lebanese Third Division.

=== Fajr Arabsalim ===
The club's licence was transferred to Al Fajr SC Arabsalim in 2000, following an initiative by Hassan Nasrallah Shouman, the former president of Fajr Zefta. Hassan Harb became president of the club in Arabsalim.

The club won the 2010–11 Lebanese Third Division without a defeat in 21 consecutive matches, earning promotion to the Lebanese Second Division for the first time as Fajr Arabsalim. The club was headed by president Mohammad Mahdi Younes at the time of its promotion.

Fajr competed in the 2011–12 Second Division, where it was drawn in Group 2. During the season, the club was among three teams relegated by the Lebanese Football Association following a decision concerning the replaying of Second Division matches. Fajr, Khoyol and Irshad subsequently protested the decision and formed a joint committee to pursue their case with the federation.

In September 2012, Mustafa Mohammad Haidar was elected president of the club. Fajr returned to the Second Division for the 2012–13 season. It finished in the relegation group and was relegated to the Third Division after drawing 0–0 with Islah Borj Shmali in its final match of the season.

The club competed in the 2013–14 Lebanese Third Division following its relegation from the Second Division. In 2016–17, it was placed in Group 3 of the Third Division. The club was also active in the 2017–18 Lebanese Third Division.

== Stadium ==
The club is based at the Hussein Saadeh Stadium (Arabic: ملعب الشهيد حسين سعادة) in Arabsalim. The stadium was inaugurated in August 2014 after development by the Council for the South, with the ceremony attended by Lebanese Football Association president Hashem Haidar and Fajr president Mustafa Haidar.

== Honours ==
- Lebanese Third Division
  - Champions (1): 2010–11

== See also ==
- List of football clubs in Lebanon
