= 2011–12 Lebanese FA Cup =

2011-12 Lebanese FA Cup
Tournament details
- Country: Lebanon
- Teams: 16

Final positions
- Champions: Al Ansar
- Runners-up: Nejmeh

The 2012 edition of the Lebanese FA Cup is the 40th edition to be played. It is the premier knockout tournament for football teams in Lebanon.

The winners qualify for the 2013 AFC Cup.

== First qualifying round phase 1 ==
Team 1	Score	Team 2
15 October 2011
Al-Ahli Bourj Rehal	5 – 0	Alarz Beirut
Al-Taqdom Anqoon	5 – 1	Al-Barq

== First qualifying round phase 2 ==
Team 1	Score	Team 2
19 October 2011
Brgalona	4 – 3	Al-Ahli Bourj Rehal
Al-Wifa	2 – 2 (8 – 9 p)	Al-Taqdom Anqoon

== Second qualifying round ==
Team 1	Score	Team 2
25 October 2011
Al-Khoyol	6 – 2	Brgalona
Homenetmen	1 – 0	Salam Zgharta
Al-Shabab	2 – 0	Al-Shabab Trables
Al-Islah	2 – 4	Shabab Al-Ghazieh
Al-Hekmah	2 – 0	Al-Mawadda
26 October 2011
Al-Fajr Arabsalim	5 – 2	Al-Ijtimai
1 November 2011
Al-Ahli Nabatiya	3 – 0	Al-Ahli Bourj Rehal
5 November 2011
Al-Nahda Ber Al-Yaas	0 – 4	Al-Ershad

== Third qualifying round ==
Team 1	Score	Team 2
8 December 2011
Homenetmen	1 – 1 (4 – 2 p)	Al-Fajr Arabsalim
9 December 2011
Al-Ahli Nabatiya	0 – 5	Al-Khoyol
Al-Shabab	0 – 2	Al-Ershad
10 December 2011
Shabab Al-Ghazieh	7 – 0	Al-Hekmah

== Round of 16 ==
Team 1	Score	Team 2
13 January 2012
Al-Nejmah	2 – 0	Al-Khoyol
Al-Ahli Saida	2 – 1	Homenetmen
Al-Mabarrah	0 – 1	Al-Ahed
14 January 2012
Tadamon Sour	1 – 0	Al-Ershad
15 January 2012
Al-Ansar	2 – 1 (aet)	Salam Sour
19 January 2012
Shabab Al-Sahel	2 – 0	Shabab Al-Ghazieh
24 January 2012
Safa	1 – 0	Tripoli
Racing Beirut	2 – 0	Al-Akhaa Al-Ahli

== Quarter-finals ==
Team 1	Score	Team 2
8 February 2012
Al-Ahli Saida	1 – 6	Al-Ansar
Racing Beirut	1 – 2 (aet)	Safa
15 February 2012
Tadamon Sour	0 – 1	Shabab Al-Sahel
Al-Nejmah	3 – 2	Al-Ahed

== Semi-finals ==
Team 1	Score	Team 2
4 April 2012
Al-Nejmah	2 – 1	Shabab Al-Sahel
29 April 2012
Al-Ansar	3 – 1	Safa

== Final ==
Team 1	Score	Team 2
9 May 2012
Al-Nejmah	1 – 2	Al-Ansar
