= 2018–19 Lebanese Second Division =

Lebanese Second Division
- Season: 2018–19
- Champions: Bourj
- Promoted: Bourj; Shabab Bourj
- Relegated: Shabab Arabi; Homenetmen
- Matches played: 132
- Goals scored: 393 (2.98 per match)

The Lebanese Second Division (Arabic: الدوري اللبناني - الدرجة الثانية) is the second division of Lebanese football. It is controlled by the Federation Libanaise de Football Association. The top two teams qualify for the Lebanese Premier League and replace the relegated teams, while the bottom two are relegated to the Lebanese Third Division.

Nahda Barelias and Shabab El Bourj were promoted from the Third Division, while Al Shabab Al Arabi and Al Islah were relegated from the Lebanese Premier League in 2017–18.

== Teams ==
Locations of teams in the 2018–19 Lebanese Premier League
Locations of teams in the 2018–19 Lebanese Premier League within Beirut

Team	Home city	Stadium	Capacity	2017–18 season
Ahli Nabatieh	Nabatieh	Kfarjoz Stadium		5th in the Lebanese Second Division
Ahli Saida	Sidon	Saida Municipal Stadium	22,000	8th in the Lebanese Second Division
Bourj	Beirut	Safa Stadium	4,000	3rd in the Lebanese Second Division
Egtmaaey	Tripoli	International Olympic Stadium	25,000	9th in the Lebanese Second Division
Hekmeh	Beirut	Safa Stadium	4,000	10th in the Lebanese Second Division
Homenetmen	Beirut	Bourj Hammoud Stadium	10,500	7th in the Lebanese Second Division
Islah Bourj Shimaly	Tyre	Sour Stadium	6,500	12th in the Lebanese Premier League
Mabarrah	Beirut	Ahed Stadium	2,000	4th in the Lebanese Second Division
Nahda Barelias	Barelias	Jamal Abdel Nasser Stadium		1st in the Lebanese Third Division
Nasser Bar Elias	Barelias	Jamal Abdel Nasser Stadium		6th in the Lebanese Second Division
Shabab Arabi	Beirut	Safa Stadium	4,000	11th in the Lebanese Premier League
Shabab Bourj	Beirut	Ahed Stadium	2,000	2nd in the Lebanese Third Division

== League table ==
Pos	Team	Pld	W	D	L	GF	GA	GD	Pts	Promotion or relegation
1	Bourj	22	17	4	1	42	9	+33	55	Promotion to Lebanese Premier League
2	Shabab Bourj	22	15	2	5	48	21	+27	47	Promotion to Lebanese Premier League
3	Ahli Saida	22	14	3	5	44	27	+17	45	
4	Hekmeh	22	7	8	7	29	37	−8	29	
5	Egtmaaey	22	8	3	11	43	41	+2	27	
6	Ahli Nabatieh	22	6	8	8	37	45	−8	26	
7	Nahda Barelias	22	6	8	8	24	30	−6	26	
8	Nasser Bar Elias	22	7	4	11	26	34	−8	25	
9	Islah Bourj Shimaly	22	7	4	11	26	39	−13	25	
10	Mabarrah	22	5	10	7	20	23	−3	25	
11	Shabab Arabi	22	5	5	12	24	35	−11	20	Relegation to Lebanese Third Division
12	Homenetmen	22	4	3	15	30	52	−22	15	Relegation to Lebanese Third Division

Updated to match(es) played on 5 April 2019. Source: Goalzz
Rules for classification: 1) Points; 2) Head-to-head points; 3) Head-to-head goal difference; 4) Goal difference; 5) Goals scored; 6) Draw.
