= 2017–18 Lebanese Second Division =

Lebanese Second Division
- Season: 2017–18
- Champions: Shabab Al-Sahel
- Promoted: Shabab Al-Sahel; Shabab Al-Ghazieh
- Relegated: Amal Maarka FC; Shabab Majdal Anjar
- Matches played: 132
- Goals scored: 419 (3.17 per match)
- Biggest home win: Shabab Al-Sahel 7-0 Al Egtmaaey Tripoli
- Biggest away win: Shabab Majdal Anjar 1-0 Shabab Al-Sahel
- Highest scoring: Al Egtmaaey Tripoli 6-3 Al-Mabarrah; Al-Ahli Nabatieh 6-3 Al Egtmaaey Tripoli

The Lebanese Second Division (Arabic: الدوري اللبناني - الدرجة الثانية) is the second division of Lebanese football. It is controlled by the Federation Libanaise de Football Association. The top two teams qualify for the Lebanese Premier League and replace the relegated teams.

== Table ==
=== League table ===
Pos	Team	Pld	W	D	L	GF	GA	GD	Pts	Promotion or relegation
1	Shabab Al-Sahel (P)	22	16	2	4	56	22	+34	50	Promotion to Lebanese Premier League
2	Shabab Al-Ghazieh (Note: Shabab Al-Ghazieh had 3 points deducted.) (P)	22	16	4	2	56	22	+34	49	Promotion to Lebanese Premier League
3	Al-Bourj FC	22	14	6	2	42	19	+23	48	
4	Al-Mabarrah	22	11	5	6	40	27	+13	38	
5	Al-Ahli Nabatieh	22	10	4	8	39	34	+5	34	
6	Nasser Bar Elias	22	9	3	10	29	31	−2	30	
7	Homenetmen Beirut F.C.	22	6	5	11	26	39	−13	23	
8	Al-Ahli Saida	22	5	7	10	27	34	−7	22	
9	Al Egtmaaey Tripoli	22	6	4	12	31	46	−15	22	
10	Hekmeh FC	22	5	6	11	30	43	−13	21	
11	Amal Maarka FC (R)	22	3	7	12	27	57	−30	16	Relegation to Lebanese Third Division
12	Shabab Majdal Anjar (R)	22	3	3	16	16	45	−29	12	Relegation to Lebanese Third Division

Updated to match(es) played on 18 March 2018. Source: Goalzz
Rules for classification: 1) Points; 2) Goal difference; 3) Number of goals scored
(P) Promoted; (R) Relegated

== Teams ==
- Al-Ahli Nabatieh
- Ahly Saida
- Amal Maarka
- Bourj
- Egtimaey Trablos
- Hekmeh FC
- Homentmen
- Mabarrah
- Nasser Bar Elias
- Shabab Al-Ghazieh
- Shabab Majdal Anjar
- Shabab Sahel

Bourj and Shabab Majdal Anjar were promoted from the Third Division, while Shabab Sahel and Egtimaey Trablos were relegated from the Lebanese Premier League in 2016-17.
