= Ansar SC Howara =

Lebanese association football club

Ansar Howara
- Full name: Ansar Howara Sporting Club
- Founded: 1988; 38 years ago
- League: Lebanese Third Division
- 2024–25: Lebanese Third Division Group A, 2nd of 6
Home colours

Ansar Sporting Club Howara (Arabic: نادي أنصار الرياضي حوارة) is a football club based in Houara, Lebanon, that competes in the Lebanese Third Division.

== History ==
Founded in 1988, the club gained promotion to the Lebanese Second Division in 2019. They were relegated back to the Lebanese Third Division, after finishing last in the 2020–21 season.

== See also ==
- List of football clubs in Lebanon
