= Nasser Club Bar Elias =

Lebanese association football club

Nasser Bar Elias
- Full name: Nasser Club Bar Elias
- Short name: Nasser, NCB
- Founded: 1970; 56 years ago
- Chairman: Fayez Salloum
- League: Lebanese Fourth Division
- 2025–26: Lebanese Fourth Division Bekaa – Group B, 1st of 8
Home colours

Nasser Club Bar Elias (Arabic: نادي ناصر برالياس), or simply Nasser, is a football club based in Barelias, Beqaa, Lebanon. Founded in 1970, the club competes in the Lebanese Fourth Division.

== History ==
Located in the city of Barelias, Nasser was founded in 1970. After finishing in 11th place in the 2020–21 Lebanese Second Division, Nasser were relegated to the Lebanese Third Division.

== Club rivalries ==
Nasser plays the Barelias derby with Nahda, as they are both based in the same city.

== Outside football ==
The club has welcomed Palestinian and Syrian players from refugee camps in the city; around 200,000 Syrian refugees and 7,000 Palestinians live in the Barelias area. The club helps fight the garbage problem, and the pollution of the Litani River, organizing regular clean-up operations in the city.

They developed educational programs and developed the first secondary school in the city for 50,000 Lebanese and 15,000 Palestinian students. Members of Nasser also organized the distribution of food and clothing for the refugees in the city.

== Honours ==
- Lebanese Third Division
  - Champions (3): 2003–04, 2011–12, 2015–16

== See also ==
- List of football clubs in Lebanon
