= Shabab Al Sahel FC =

Lebanese association football club

Shabab Sahel
- Full name: Shabab Al Sahel Football Club
- Short name: Sahel
- Founded: 1966; 60 years ago
- Ground: Shabab Al Sahel Stadium
- Chairman: Samir Dbouk
- Manager: Said Iskandar
- League: Lebanese Premier League
- 2025–26: Lebanese Premier League, 7th of 12
- Website: www.shababalsahel.net
Home colours	Away colours

Shabab Al Sahel Football Club (Arabic: نادي شباب الساحل الرياضي, lit. 'Youth of Sahel Sporting Club'), known as Shabab Sahel or simply Sahel, is a football club based in Haret Hreik, a district in Beirut, Lebanon, that competes in the Lebanese Premier League.

Founded in 1966, Shabab Al Sahel won one Lebanese FA Cup, one Lebanese Elite Cup, and two Lebanese Challenge Cups. They are predominantly supported by the Shia community.

== History ==
Shabab Sahel was established in 1966 in Haret Hreik, a district in Beirut, Lebanon. Sherif Salim was the club's first chairman, while Hassan Hatoum was its first secretary. Within three years, the club was promoted from the Third Division to the Second Division to the Premier League. However, the Lebanese Football Association didn't approve of their promotion to the top flight.

During the Civil War, Shabab Sahel were first promoted to the Premier League. Despite being relegated back to the Second Division, they were promoted back up the following season.

The club won their first title in 2000, defeating Safa 5–4 on penalties in the Lebanese FA Cup after a 1–1 draw. In 2008–09 they reached the finals, but were defeated 2–0 by Ahed. In the 2010–11 season Shabab Sahel defeated Salam Zgharta 2–0 in the quarter-finals, but lost 2–1 in the semi-final to Safa at the Rafik Hariri Stadium in Sidon.

Shabab Sahel's best league placement came in 2020–21, when they finished third with 27 points.

== Club rivalries ==
Shabab Sahel's main rival have historically been Bourj, as they both fight for supremacy over the Dahieh suburbs. The match has been dubbed the Dahieh derby. Another important rivalry is with Shabab Bourj, due to the fact that they are also based in the Dahieh area.

== Players ==
=== Current squad ===
As of 7 November 2026

Note: Flags indicate national team as defined under FIFA eligibility rules; some limited exceptions apply. Players may hold more than one non-FIFA nationality.

No.	Pos.	Nation	Player
1	GK	LBN	Ahmad Diab
2	DF	LBN	Abbass Ballout
4	DF	LBN	Fadel Assi
5	DF	LBN	Hassan Hussein Hazimeh
6	MF	LBN	Mahmoud Hoteit
7	FW	PLE	Hadi Dakwar
8	DF	LBN	Hadi Jezzini
9	FW	NGR	Etor Daniel
10	MF	LBN	Haidar Khriess
13	GK	LBN	Abed Al Karim Saleh
14	FW	NGR	Edidiong Ezekiel
16		LBN	Ziad Haidar
17		LBN	Mohammad Darwich

No.	Pos.	Nation	Player
18	FW	NGR	Christian Chukwuka
20	FW	LBN	Hussein Ibrahim
21		LBN	Alaa El Naboulsi
22	DF	LBN	Mohammad El Jamal
27	MF	LBN	Houssein Rizk (captain)
30	MF	LBN	Mohammad Saad
33	DF	NGR	Temple Emekayi
66	MF	LBN	Hassan Samir Dbouk
70	FW	LBN	Mohammad Jawad Fahes
71		LBN	Issa El Osman
—	GK	LBN	Omar Challah
—		LBN	Ali El Housseini
—		LBN	Jawad El Zein

=== Notable players ===
Players in international competitions
Competition	Player	National team
2000 AFC Asian Cup	Adnan Mohammad	Iraq
2000 AFC Asian Cup	Luís Fernandes	Lebanon

== Honours ==
- Lebanese FA Cup
  - Winners (1): 1999–2000
  - Runners-up (3): 1987–88, 2008–09, 2012–13
- Lebanese Elite Cup (defunct)
  - Winners (1): 2019
  - Runners-up (1): 1999
- Lebanese Challenge Cup (defunct)
  - Winners (2; joint record): 2014, 2015
- Lebanese Second Division
  - Winners (2): 2005–06, 2017–18
- Lebanese Super Cup
  - Runners-up (2): 2000, 2013

== See also ==
- List of football clubs in Lebanon
