= 2026–27 Lebanese FA Cup =

Tournament details
- Country: Lebanon
- Dates: 6 September 2026 – TBD 2027
- Teams: 16

Tournament statistics
- Matches played: 24
- Goals scored: 67 (2.79 per match)
- Top goal scorer: Hadi Dakwar (4 goals)
- All statistics correct as of 20 September 2026.

The 2026–27 Lebanese FA Cup is the 53rd season of the Lebanese FA Cup, the national domestic cup competition for football in Lebanon.

The competition began on 6 September 2026. It featured 16 clubs in the round of 16, consisting of the 12 clubs that participated in the 2025–26 Lebanese Premier League, and the top four clubs from the 2025–26 Lebanese Second Division. The round of 16 is divided into four groups of four clubs, with each group played as a single round-robin. The top two clubs in each group advance to the quarter-finals.

The defending champions are Nejmeh, who defeated Sagesse 2–0 in the 2026 final to win their ninth Lebanese FA Cup title.

== Changes to participating teams ==
Mabarra were initially drawn to participate in the competition. However, on 2 September 2026, the club announced the suspension of all football activities and the dissolution of its football teams, citing the difficult economic conditions in Lebanon. Mabarra subsequently reached an agreement with Chabab Ghazieh for the latter to take over its position in the Premier League. Under the arrangement, Chabab Ghazieh's players were registered with Mabarra, and the team competed in the Lebanese FA Cup under the Mabarra name pending the completion of the administrative procedures required to change its name to Chabab Ghazieh.

== Round of 16 ==
The round of 16 consisted of 16 clubs divided into four groups of four. The groups were drawn on 24 August 2026. The four highest-placed clubs in the 2025–26 Lebanese Premier League were seeded as group heads. Each group was played as a single round-robin, with the top two clubs advancing to the quarter-finals.

Number of teams per tier still in competition
Premier League	Second Division	Total
12 / 12	4 / 12	16 / 24

=== Group A ===
Pos	Team	Pld	W	D	L	GF	GA	GD	Pts	Qualification or relegation
1	Ansar	3	3	0	0	6	1	+5	9	Advance to quarter-finals
2	Salam Zgharta	3	2	0	1	3	3	0	6	Advance to quarter-finals
3	Bourj	3	1	0	2	3	4	−1	3	
4	Mabarra (Note: Following Mabarra's withdrawal from football, Chabab Ghazieh took over its position and competed under the Mabarra name pending the completion of the name-change procedures.)	3	0	0	3	2	6	−4	0	

Source: Global Sports Archive
Notes:

6 September 2026	Mabarra (1)	1–2	Bourj (2)	Beirut
16:00 UTC+3	Sarfo 63'	Report	Bazzi 40'; Hareb 90+3'	Stadium: Al Ahed Stadium; Referee: Kazem El Khansa

6 September 2026	Ansar (1)	2–0	Salam Zgharta (2)	Tripoli
16:00 UTC+3	Al Massri 64'; Osman 90+4'	Report		Stadium: Tripoli Municipal Stadium; Referee: Mahmoud Seifeddine

12 September 2026	Ansar (1)	2–1	Bourj (2)	Bhamdoun
16:00 UTC+3	Bou Saleh 53'; Tneich 85'	Report	Rahhal 47'	Stadium: Amin Abdelnour Stadium; Referee: Wael Haidar

12 September 2026	Salam Zgharta (2)	2–1	Mabarra (1)	Beirut
16:00 UTC+3	Khawaja 65'; Assaf 69'	Report	Makki 80'	Stadium: Al Ahed Stadium; Referee: Karim Chehade

19 September 2026	Ansar (1)	2–0	Mabarra (1)	Beirut
15:30 UTC+3	Tneich 44' (pen.); Sabbah 57'	Report		Stadium: Al Ahed Stadium; Referee: Zaher Boutary

19 September 2026	Bourj (2)	0–1	Salam Zgharta (2)	Jounieh
15:30 UTC+3		Report	Yarak 85'	Stadium: Fouad Chehab Stadium; Referee: Ali Al Ashkar

=== Group B ===
Pos	Team	Pld	W	D	L	GF	GA	GD	Pts	Qualification or relegation
1	Jwaya	3	3	0	0	7	2	+5	9	Advance to quarter-finals
2	Tadamon Sour	3	2	0	1	4	2	+2	6	Advance to quarter-finals
3	Sagesse	3	1	0	2	3	4	−1	3	
4	Rissala Toura	3	0	0	3	2	8	−6	0	

Source: Global Sports Archive

9 September 2026	Sagesse (1)	2–0	Tadamon Sour (1)	Beirut
15:00 UTC+3		Report	Al Samahi 26'; Namedi 90+4'	Stadium: Safa Stadium; Referee: Zaher Boutary

9 September 2026	Jwaya (1)	4–1	Rissala Toura (2)	Jwaya
18:00 UTC+3	Fawaz 2'; Hebous 35' (pen.); Kaafarani 57', 90+3'	Report	Hakim 78'	Stadium: Mohamad Said Saad Stadium; Referee: Taha Kobeissi

13 September 2026	Rissala Toura (2)	0–2	Sagesse (1)	Beirut
16:00 UTC+3		Report	Hammoud 6'; Dieng 18'	Stadium: Al Ahed Stadium; Referee: Doumouh Al Bakkar

13 September 2026	Jwaya (1)	1–0	Tadamon Sour (1)	Jwaya
16:00 UTC+3	Madi 80' (o.g.)	Report		Stadium: Mohamad Said Saad Stadium; Referee: Hadi Salame

19 September 2026	Jwaya (1)	2–1	Sagesse (1)	Jounieh
20:30 UTC+3	Kazan 26'; Bolingi 69' (pen.)	Report	Dieng 39'	Stadium: Fouad Chehab Stadium; Referee: Mohamad Issa

19 September 2026	Tadamon Sour (1)	2–1	Rissala Toura (2)	Jwaya
18:00 UTC+3	Youssef Atriss 27', 66'	Report	Chaito 51'	Stadium: Mohamad Said Saad Stadium

=== Group C ===
Pos	Team	Pld	W	D	L	GF	GA	GD	Pts	Qualification or relegation
1	Nejmeh	3	3	0	0	8	1	+7	9	Advance to quarter-finals
2	Tripoli	3	2	0	1	4	1	+3	6	Advance to quarter-finals
3	Safa	3	1	0	2	7	5	+2	3	
4	Racing Beirut	3	0	0	3	0	12	−12	0	

Source: Global Sports Archive

8 September 2026	Nejmeh (1)	1–0	Tripoli (1)	Tripoli
16:00 UTC+3	Gbadamosi 3'	Report		Stadium: Tripoli Municipal Stadium; Referee: Hadi Salame

8 September 2026	Safa (1)	6–0	Racing Beirut (2)	Beirut
16:00 UTC+3	Slim 19', 32'; Abi Shakra 35'; Assaf 66'; Dwek 70' (pen.), 72'	Report		Stadium: Al Ahed Stadium; Referee: Ayman Hassan

12 September 2026	Nejmeh (1)	4–0	Racing Beirut (2)	Beirut
16:00 UTC+3	Sene 4'; Ismail 6'; Sherkawi 36'; Quejada 43'	Report		Stadium: Rafic Hariri Stadium; Referee: Mohamad Haddad

13 September 2026	Tripoli (1)	2–0	Safa (1)	Tripoli
16:00 UTC+3	Akuka 11', 90+10'	Report		Stadium: Tripoli Municipal Stadium; Referee: Ali Al Ashkar

20 September 2026	Nejmeh (1)	3–1	Safa (1)	Jounieh
18:00 UTC+3	El Fadl 10'; El Zein 31'; Quejada 90+4'	Report	Salloum 72'	Stadium: Fouad Chehab Stadium; Referee: Maher Al Ali

20 September 2026	Racing Beirut (2)	0–2	Tripoli (1)	Beirut
15:30 UTC+3		Report	Kraytem 3'; Al Kour 45+2' (o.g.)	Stadium: Safa Stadium; Referee: Taha Kobeissi

=== Group D ===
Pos	Team	Pld	W	D	L	GF	GA	GD	Pts	Qualification or relegation
1	Shabab Sahel	3	3	0	0	7	1	+6	9	Advance to quarter-finals
2	Ahed	3	2	0	1	8	2	+6	6	Advance to quarter-finals
3	Akhaa Ahli Aley	3	1	0	2	1	6	−5	3	
4	Riyadi Abbasiyah	3	0	0	3	2	9	−7	0	

Source: Global Sports Archive

6 September 2026	Shabab Sahel (1)	4–1	Riyadi Abbasiyah (1)	Beirut
16:00 UTC+3	Dakwar 35', 53', 58'; El Jamal 69'	Report	Sati 23'	Stadium: Safa Stadium; Referee: Baraa El Hayek

7 September 2026	Ahed (1)	4–0	Akhaa Ahli Aley (1)	Beirut
15:00 UTC+3	Haidar 67'; Afolabi 76', 90+1'; Antar 85'	Report		Stadium: Safa Stadium; Referee: Ali Chams

12 September 2026	Ahed (1)	4–1	Riyadi Abbasiyah (1)	Jwaya
17:00 UTC+3	Antar 4', 28'; Badamassi 26'; Salami 41'	Report	Fadel Ajami 54'	Stadium: Mohamad Said Saad Stadium; Referee: Mohammad Ghaddar

13 September 2026	Akhaa Ahli Aley (1)	0–2	Shabab Sahel (1)	Beirut
16:00 UTC+3		Report	Khriess 2'; Dakwar 90+2'	Stadium: Safa Stadium; Referee: Maher Al Ali

19 September 2026	Ahed (1)	0–1	Shabab Sahel (1)	Beirut
15:30 UTC+3		Report	Darwich 24'	Stadium: Safa Stadium; Referee: Ali Moubarak

20 September 2026	Riyadi Abbasiyah (1)	0–1	Akhaa Ahli Aley (1)	Beirut
15:30 UTC+3		Report	Amhaz 40' (o.g.)	Stadium: Al Ahed Stadium; Referee: Kazem El Khansa

== Quarter-finals ==
Number of teams per tier still in competition
Premier League	Second Division	Total
7 / 12	1 / 12	8 / 24

The quarter-finals will be played as single matches. If a match is level after 90 minutes, extra time will be played, followed by a penalty shoot-out if necessary.

Ansar (1)	v	Tadamon Sour (1)

Jwaya (1)	v	Salam Zgharta (2)

Nejmeh (1)	v	Ahed (1)

Shabab Sahel (1)	v	Tripoli (1)

== Semi-finals ==
Number of teams per tier still in competition
Premier League	Second Division	Total
0 / 12	0 / 12	0 / 24

The semi-finals will be played as single matches. If a match is level after 90 minutes, extra time will be played, followed by a penalty shoot-out if necessary.

v

v

== Final ==
Number of teams per tier still in competition
Premier League	Second Division	Total
0 / 12	0 / 12	0 / 24

v

== Bracket ==
The following is the bracket which the Lebanese FA Cup resembles. Numbers in parentheses next to the score represent the results of a penalty shoot-out.

Quarter-finals; TBD
Ansar
Tadamon Sour
Jwaya
Salam Zgharta
Nejmeh
Ahed
Shabab Sahel
Tripoli

Semi-finals; TBD
TBD
TBD
TBD
TBD

Final; TBD
TBD
TBD

== See also ==
- 2026–27 Lebanese Premier League
- 2026 Lebanese Super Cup
