= List of football stadiums in Lebanon =

The following is a list of football stadiums in Lebanon, ranked in descending order of capacity. Prior to the start of each Lebanese Premier League season, every team chooses two stadiums as their home venues. In case both stadiums are unavailable for a certain matchday, another venue is used.

== Current stadiums ==
#	Image	Stadium	Capacity	City	Home team
1		Camille Chamoun Sports City Stadium	49,500	Beirut	Lebanon national team
2		Saida Municipal Stadium	22,600	Sidon	Ahli Saida
3		Tripoli International Olympic Stadium	22,400	Tripoli	
4		Beirut Municipal Stadium	18,000	Beirut	
5		Tripoli Municipal Stadium	12,000	Tripoli	Tripoli
6		Bourj Hammoud Stadium	10,000	Bourj Hammoud	Homenetmen; Homenmen; Bourj
7		Baalbek Municipal Stadium	8,500	Baalbek	
8		Mohamad Said Saad Stadium	6,500	Jwaya	Jwaya
8		Sour Municipal Stadium	6,500	Tyre	Tadamon Sour; Salam Sour
10		Fouad Chehab Stadium	5,000	Jounieh	Racing Beirut; Racing Jounieh
10		Nabi Chit Stadium	5,000	Al-Nabi Shayth	Shabab Baalbeck
10		Rafic Hariri Stadium	5,000	Beirut	Nejmeh
10		Zgharta Sports Complex	5,000	Zgharta	Salam Zgharta
10		Al Mabarra Stadium	5,000	Beirut	Mabarra
15		Safa Stadium	4,000	Beirut	Safa
15		Amin Abdelnour Stadium	4,000	Bhamdoun	Akhaa Ahli Aley
17		Abbas Kazem Nasser Stadium	3,000	Abbassiyeh	Riyadi Abbasiyah
18		Al Ahed Stadium	2,000	Beirut	Ahed
18		Kfarjoz Municipal Stadium	2,000	Nabatieh	Chabab Ghazieh
20		Maaroub Municipal Stadium	1,500	Maaroub	
20		Bourj el-Barajneh Stadium	1,500	Bourj el-Barajneh	
22		Ansar Stadium	1,000	Beirut	
23		Imam Musa Al-Sadr Stadium	500	Bnaafoul	
23		Shabab Al Sahel Stadium	500	Beirut	Shabab Sahel
25		Khiara Stadium		Khiara	

== See also ==
- List of association football stadiums by capacity
- List of Asian stadiums by capacity
- Lists of stadiums
