= 2023–24 Lebanese Premier League =

62nd season of the Lebanese Premier League

Lebanese Premier League
- Season: 2023–24
- Dates: 4 August 2023 – 30 June 2024
- Champions: Nejmeh
- Relegated: Tripoli; Ahly Nabatieh
- 2024–25 AFC Challenge League: Nejmeh
- Matches: 156
- Goals: 369 (2.37 per match)
- Top goalscorer: Elhadji Malick Tall (20 goals)
- Biggest win: Shabab Sahel 0–5 Ahed (6 August 2023); Ahed 5–0 Chabab Ghazieh (7 December 2023); Tadamon Sour 0–5 Chabab Ghazieh (3 May 2024); Shabab Sahel 5–0 Ahly Nabatieh (9 May 2024)
- Highest scoring: Ahed 5–1 Racing Beirut (6 August 2023); Tripoli 2–4 Safa (1 October 2023); Nejmeh 1–5 Ansar (8 December 2023); Racing Beirut 1–5 Ahed (16 May 2024)

The 2023–24 Lebanese Premier League was the 62nd season of the Lebanese Premier League, the top Lebanese league for football clubs since its establishment in 1934. The league started on 4 August 2023, and ended on 30 June 2024.

It was the fourth season to feature a "split" format, following its introduction in the 2020–21 season, in which the season is divided into two phases. Nejmeh won their ninth title after defeating Ansar in the last matchday. Tripoli and Ahly Nabatieh were relegated to the Lebanese Second Division.

== Summary ==
=== Regulations ===
Each club had to involve one player under the age of 21 for at least 750 minutes, and two players for 1,000 combined minutes. In case a club were not able to meet the required number of minutes at the end of the season, they would have had three points deducted from their total in the league.

Starting from this season, each club was able to have four foreign players under contract, an increase from the previous limit of three. Furthermore, video assistant referee (VAR) was introduced to the Lebanese Premier League in the second half of the 2023–24 season. It used technology and officials to assist the referee in making decisions on the pitch. The match between Ahed and Racing Beirut in the first matchday, on 6 August 2023, was the first to test the use of VAR.

=== Format ===
Following its introduction in the 2020–21 season, the 2023–24 season consisted of two phases: in the first phase, each team played against one another once. In the second phase, the 12 teams were divided into two groups based on their position in the first phase. As introduced in the 2022–23 season, teams only carried over half of their point tally from the first phase. After the first phase was completed, clubs could not move out of their own half in the league, even if they achieved more or fewer points than a higher or lower ranked team, respectively.

The top six teams played against each other three times, contrary to the previous two seasons where they played each other twice. Due to a restructuring of the Asian Football Confederation (AFC) competitions, the champion automatically qualified to the newly introduced third-tier competition: the AFC Challenge League. The bottom six teams also played against each other three times, with the bottom two teams being relegated to the Lebanese Second Division.

== Teams ==
Twelve teams competed in the league – the top ten teams from the previous season and the two teams promoted from the Lebanese Second Division. The promoted teams were Racing Beirut, who returned to the top flight after an absence of four years, and Ahly Nabatieh, who were playing their first season in the Lebanese Premier League. They replaced Akhaa Ahli Aley and Salam Zgharta, who were relegated to the Lebanese Second Division after respective spells of seven and one years in the top flight.

=== Stadiums and locations ===
Locations of the 2023–24 Lebanese Premier League teams
Beirut Lebanese Premier League clubs

Note: Table lists in alphabetical order.

Team	Location	Stadium	Capacity
Ahed	Beirut (Ouzai)	Al Ahed Stadium (Note: Only used as a training ground)	2,000
Ahly Nabatieh	Nabatieh	Kfarjoz Municipal Stadium	2,000
Ansar	Beirut (Tariq El Jdideh)	Ansar Stadium	—N/a
Bourj	Beirut (Bourj el-Barajneh)	Bourj el-Barajneh Stadium	1,500
Chabab Ghazieh	Ghazieh	Kfarjoz Municipal Stadium	2,000
Nejmeh	Beirut (Ras Beirut)	Rafic Hariri Stadium	5,000
Racing Beirut	Beirut (Achrafieh)	Fouad Chehab Stadium	5,000
Safa	Beirut (Wata El Msaytbeh)	Safa Stadium	4,000
Sagesse	Beirut (Achrafieh)	Sin El Fil Stadium	—N/a
Shabab Sahel	Beirut (Haret Hreik)	Shabab Al Sahel Stadium	—N/a
Tadamon Sour	Tyre	Sour Municipal Stadium	6,500
Tripoli	Tripoli	Tripoli Municipal Stadium	10,000

=== Foreign players ===
Lebanese clubs were allowed to have four foreign players at their disposal at any time, as well as unlimited Palestinian players born in Lebanon in a given match sheet (of which only one allowed among the eleven players on the field). Moreover, each club competing in an AFC competition was allowed to field two extra foreign players, to be only played in continental matches, as the AFC allowed six foreign players to play in the starting eleven (one of whom from an AFC country).

- Players in **bold** were registered during the mid-season transfer window.
- Players in italics left the club during the mid-season transfer window.

Team	Player 1	Player 2	Player 3	Player 4	Palestinian player(s)	AFC player(s)	Former players
Ahed	(Syria) Mohammad Al Marmour	(Scotland) Lee Erwin	(Syria) Mohammad Al Hallak	(Syria) **Diaa Al Mohammad**			(Jordan) Mohammad Abu Hasheesh
Ahly Nabatieh	(Ghana) Godfred Yeboah	(Nigeria) Ifeanyi Eze	(Tunisia) **Hamza Zaak**	(Syria) **Raafat Mehtdi**		—N/a	(Nigeria) Opaleye Brown (Senegal) Baye Daour Badji
Ansar	(Senegal) Elhadji Malick Tall	(Mali) **Ichaka Diarra**	(France) **Abdallah Yaisien**	(Algeria) **Hichem Houssam Eddine**	(Palestine) Mohamad Hebous (Palestine) Hamza Hussein	—N/a	(Mali) Yacouba Doumbia (Belgium) Foudil Bouchentouf Idriss (Tunisia) Omar Zekri
Bourj	(Syria) Ahmad Al Saleh	(Tunisia) Houssem Louati	(Ghana) Prosper Donkor	(Senegal) Tidiane Camara		—N/a	
Chabab Ghazieh	(Ivory Coast) Chris-Calvin Nawatta	(Ghana) **Amissah Anfoh Assan**	(Ghana) **Yaw Dasi Obuoba**	(Ghana) **Abdulai Ibrahim**	(Palestine) Ayman Abou Sahyoun	—N/a	(Ghana) Ezra Amelinsa (Nigeria) Joshua Abah
Nejmeh	(Georgia (country)) **Giorgi Kantaria**	(Portugal) **Vítor Barata**	(Moldova) **Artiom Litveacov**	(Brazil) **Everton**	(Palestine) Zaher Al Samahi		(Portugal) Gilson Costa (Afghanistan) Omid Popalzay (Ukraine) Dmytro Bilonoh (Guinea-Bissau) José Embaló
Racing Beirut	(Serbia) Lazar Arsić	(Republic of the Congo) **Brel Mohendiki**	(Republic of the Congo) **Roland Okouri**	(Republic of the Congo) **Yann Mokombo**	(Palestine) Jehad Abou El Aynein	—N/a	(Japan) Shodai Tomemori
Safa	(Netherlands) Johan Kappelhof	(Germany) Arnold Suew	(Germany) **Sebastian Jakubiak**	(Montenegro) **Danin Talović**	(Palestine) Adnan Salloum	—N/a	(Netherlands) Jordy Bruijn (Germany) Marco Reinhardt
Sagesse	(Senegal) Papa Sidibe	(Brazil) Vinícius Calamari	(Senegal) Boucounta Sarr	(Senegal) **Papy Thiandoum**		—N/a	(Senegal) Adramé Diallo
Shabab Sahel	(Ghana) Richard Baffour	(Nigeria) Andrew Ikefe	(Nigeria) **Emmanuel Obere**	(Nigeria) **Samad Kadiri**	(Palestine) Hadi Dakwar	—N/a	(Nigeria) Francis Nwankwo (Senegal) Fallou Galass Wade
Tadamon Sour	(Algeria) **El Mehdi Boukassi**	(France) **Madikaba Doumbia**	(Zambia) **Alex Ngonga**	(Republic of the Congo) **Kévin Koubemba**	(Palestine) Mohammad Ismail (Palestine) Ghassan Sarriyeh (Palestine) Jihad Hallak	—N/a	(Ghana) Osman Konate (Ghana) Ibrahim Sauma (Ghana) Oussai Oddo
Tripoli	(Nigeria) James Innocent	(Jordan) Suleiman Abu Zam'a	(Brazil) Gerônimo	(Brazil) **Thiago Amaral**	(Palestine) Omar Kayed (Palestine) Ibrahim Abdelwahhab	—N/a	(Syria) Sharif Sibaii

== League table ==
Pos	Team	Pld	W	D	L	GF	GA	GD	Pts	Qualification or relegation (Note: Teams played each other once (11 matches), before the league was split into two groups (the top six and the bottom six) where each team played the other teams in their group three times (15 matches). Teams carried over half their point tally from the first phase into the second phase.)
1	Nejmeh (C)	26	19	3	4	44	20	+24	46	Qualification for the AFC Challenge League group stage
2	Ansar	26	16	7	3	55	24	+31	45	
3	Ahed	26	15	5	6	54	22	+32	36	
4	Safa	26	8	10	8	35	38	−3	26	
5	Bourj	26	9	8	9	26	32	−6	25	
6	Racing Beirut	26	3	10	13	29	50	−21	12	
7	Shabab Sahel	26	10	9	7	30	23	+7	32	
8	Tadamon Sour	26	7	7	12	16	28	−12	26	
9	Sagesse	26	7	6	13	21	30	−9	24	
10	Chabab Ghazieh	26	6	7	13	22	41	−19	23	
11	Ahly Nabatieh (R)	26	5	10	11	16	32	−16	22	Relegation to Lebanese Second Division
12	Tripoli (R)	26	7	6	13	21	29	−8	21	Relegation to Lebanese Second Division

Source: Global Sports Archive
Rules for classification: 1) Points; 2) Head-to-head points; 3) Head-to-head goal difference; 4) Goal difference; 5) Goals scored; 6) Disciplinary points.
(C) Champions; (R) Relegated

== Season statistics ==
=== Goalscorers ===
Rank	Player	Club	Goals
1	(Senegal) Elhadji Malick Tall	Ansar	20
2	(Lebanon) Karim Darwich	Ahed	12
3	(Lebanon) Mohamad Kdouh	Safa	10
3	(Scotland) Lee Erwin	Ahed	10
5	(Lebanon) Hassan Maatouk	Ansar	8
5	(Syria) Mohammad Al Marmour	Ahed	8
5	(Nigeria) Samad Kadiri	Shabab Sahel	8

=== Hat-tricks ===
Player	For	Against	Result	Date
(Netherlands) Jordy Bruijn	Safa	Sagesse	3–1	19 August 2023
(Scotland) Lee Erwin	Ahed	Shabab Sahel	5–0	24 September 2023
(Lebanon) Mohamad Kdouh	Safa	Tadamon Sour	4–1	4 November 2023
(Nigeria) Samad Kadiri	Shabab Sahel	Ahly Nabatieh	5–0	9 May 2024

== See also ==
- 2023–24 Lebanese FA Cup
- 2023 Lebanese Federation Cup
- 2023 Lebanese Super Cup
