= 2026–27 Lebanese Premier League =

65th season of the Lebanese Premier League

Lebanese Premier League
- Season: 2026–27
- Dates: 8 October 2026 – 12 April 2027
- Matches: 20
- Goals: 52 (2.6 per match)
- Top goalscorer: Plamedi Lukasi (6 goals)
- Biggest win: Three-goal difference (5 matches)
- Highest scoring: Nejmeh 3–3 Tadamon Sour (12 October 2026)
- All statistics correct as of 24 October 2026.

The 2026–27 Lebanese Premier League, officially known as the Fantasia Football Championship (Arabic: بطولة فانتازيا لكرة القدم) for sponsorship reasons, is the 65th season of the Lebanese Premier League, the top Lebanese league for football clubs since its establishment in 1934. It began on 8 October 2026.

== Summary ==
=== Regulations ===
For the 2026–27 season, clubs are required to give playing time to players born in 2005 or later. One such player must accumulate at least 1,500 minutes across the league and Lebanese FA Cup, while two such players must accumulate 2,500 minutes between them.

The rules governing foreign players were amended several times before the start of the season. The technical regulations issued by the Lebanese Football Association (LFA) on 31 July 2026 allowed clubs to include up to five non-Lebanese players on the official match sheet for each match, but did not specify an overall registration limit. The LFA subsequently clarified that clubs could register only five foreign players, prompting an objection from Nejmeh, which argued that the original wording had allowed clubs to register more than five. On 27 August, the LFA Executive Committee amended the rule again, allowing clubs to register up to seven foreign players for the season, with a maximum of five permitted on the official match sheet for each match.

A Palestinian player registered with the Lebanese authorities as a Palestinian is counted as a non-Lebanese player. The restriction on the number of players over the age of 30 was removed for the 2026–27 season.

The LFA also amended the regulations governing transfers during the season, allowing clubs to make changes to their foreign-player contingent after the first phase of the regular season.

Video assistant referee (VAR) was introduced to the Lebanese Premier League during the second half of the 2023–24 season. It uses video technology and match officials to assist the referee in reviewing decisions during matches. A match between Ahed and Racing Beirut on 6 August 2023 was used to test the VAR system before its introduction.

=== Format ===
The 2026–27 Lebanese Premier League consists of 12 clubs and is divided into two phases. The first phase is played on a home-and-away basis, with each club playing every other club twice, once at home and once away, for a total of 22 matches per club.

After the first phase, the league is divided into two groups of six according to the teams' positions in the table. The top four teams enter the championship group, while the bottom four enter the relegation group. Each club carries over half of the points it accumulated during the first phase, with a half point rounded up to a full point.

Both groups are played on a home-and-away basis, with each club playing the other five clubs in its group twice, for a further 10 matches per club. The club with the highest total of points after the completion of the second phase is crowned Lebanese Premier League champion.

Initially, the LFA planned to reduce the First Division from 12 to 10 clubs for the 2027–28 season, which would have resulted in four clubs being relegated from the 2026–27 Premier League and two promoted from the Second Division. On 26 August 2026, however, the LFA Executive Committee reversed the reduction plan and retained the 12-club format, restoring the two-club relegation system.

=== Fixtures and draw ===
An initial fixture schedule was announced on 24 August 2026. The LFA subsequently decided not to adopt the First and Second Division schedules after it emerged that they had been based on the previous season's final standings without an actual draw; a new draw was held on 31 August.

== Teams ==
Twelve teams compete in the league – the top ten teams from the previous season and the two teams promoted from the Lebanese Second Division. The promoted teams are Akhaa Ahli Aley and Tripoli, who returned to the top flight after an absence of two and three years, respectively. They replaced Bourj and Racing Beirut, who were relegated to the Lebanese Second Division after respective spells of seven and three years in the top flight.

Mabarra were due to compete in the 2026–27 season, after finishing the previous season in eighth place. However, they withdrew on 2 September 2026, prior to the start of the season, citing financial difficulties. Following an agreement between the two clubs, Chabab Ghazieh took over Mabarra's position in the league, with its players initially registered under Mabarra and the team competing under the Mabarra name pending the completion of administrative procedures to change the club's name to Chabab Ghazieh.

=== Stadiums and locations ===
Locations of the 2026–27 Lebanese Premier League teams
Beirut Lebanese Premier League clubs

The following table lists teams in alphabetical order. Locations refer to where the clubs are based, not necessarily where their stadiums are. The stadiums listed are where clubs typically train, but are not necessarily club-owned. League games are usually held in a few neutral stadiums, which may differ from those listed.

Team	Location	Stadium
Ahed	Beirut (Ouzai)	Al Ahed Stadium
Akhaa Ahli Aley	Aley	Amin Abdelnour Stadium
Ansar	Beirut (Tariq el-Jdideh)	Al Ansar Stadium
Mabarra	Beirut (Tariq el-Matar)	Mabarra Field
Jwaya	Jwaya	Mohamad Said Saad Stadium
Nejmeh	Beirut (Ras Beirut)	Rafic Hariri Stadium
Riyadi Abbasiyah	Abbassiyeh	Abbas Kazem Nasser Stadium
Safa	Beirut (Wata el-Msaytbeh)	Safa Stadium
Sagesse	Beirut (Achrafieh)	Fouad Chehab Stadium
Shabab Sahel	Beirut (Haret Hreik)	Shabab Al Sahel Stadium
Tadamon Sour	Tyre	Sour Municipal Stadium
Tripoli	Tripoli	Tripoli Municipal Stadium

=== Personnel and kits ===
Team	Head coach	Captain	Kit manufacturer	Shirt sponsor
Ahed	(Egypt) Jamal Al Haj	(Lebanon) Hussein Dakik	(Spain) Kelme	
Akhaa Ahli Aley	(Lebanon) Rabih Abo Fakher		(Spain) Kelme	Atyab Farouj
Ansar	(Lebanon) Sami El-Choum	(Lebanon) Ali Tneich	(Spain) Kelme	Seven
Jwaya	(Algeria) Miloud Hamdi	(Lebanon) Hassan Maatouk	(Spain) Kelme	
Mabarra	(Lebanon) Hussein Hassoun	(Lebanon) Jawad Khalife	(Spain) Kelme	Jouni
Nejmeh	(Armenia) Vardan Minasyan	(Lebanon) Kassem El Zein	(United States) Capelli Sport	Tawfeer
Riyadi Abbasiyah	(Lebanon) Nasrat Al Jamal	(Lebanon) Fadel Ajami	(Spain) Kelme	
Safa	(Lebanon) Hussein Tahan	(Lebanon) Kassem Hayek	(Spain) Kelme	
Sagesse	(Lebanon) Paul Rustom	(Lebanon) Hassan Hammoud	(United States) Capelli Sport	Betarabia
Shabab Sahel	(Lebanon) Said Iskandar	(Lebanon) Houssein Rizk	(Spain) Kelme	Xglobal Group
Tadamon Sour	(Lebanon) Bilal Hajo	(Lebanon) Hadi Madi	(Spain) Kelme	
Tripoli	(Lebanon) Malek Hassoun	(Lebanon) Nour Mansour	(Spain) Kelme	Atyab Farouj

== League table ==
Pos	Team	Pld	W	D	L	GF	GA	GD	Pts	Qualification or relegation (Note: Teams play each other twice (22 matches), before the league is split into two groups of six (the top six and the bottom six), where each team plays the other teams in their group twice (10 matches). Teams carry over half their point tally from the first phase into the second phase.)
1	Jwaya	4	4	0	0	10	1	+9	12	
2	Tadamon Sour	4	3	1	0	10	5	+5	10	
3	Safa	3	3	0	0	7	2	+5	9	
4	Ahed	4	2	2	0	4	2	+2	8	
5	Tripoli	4	2	1	1	7	3	+4	7	
6	Nejmeh	2	1	1	0	5	3	+2	4	
7	Ansar	1	1	0	0	2	1	+1	3	
8	Mabarra (Note: Following Mabarra's withdrawal from football, Chabab Ghazieh took over its position and competed under the Mabarra name pending the completion of the name-change procedures.)	4	1	0	3	1	7	−6	3	
9	Sagesse	4	0	1	3	2	7	−5	1	
10	Riyadi Abbasiyah	3	0	0	3	2	5	−3	0	
11	Shabab Sahel	3	0	0	3	0	6	−6	0	Relegation to Lebanese Second Division
12	Akhaa Ahli Aley	4	0	0	4	2	10	−8	0	Relegation to Lebanese Second Division

Updated to match(es) played on 24 October 2026. Source: Global Sports Archive
Rules for classification: 1) Points; 2) Head-to-head points; 3) Head-to-head goal difference; 4) Goal difference; 5) Goals scored; 6) Disciplinary points.

== Season statistics ==
As of 24 October 2026

=== Goalscorers ===
Rank	Player	Club	Goals
1	(Democratic Republic of the Congo) Plamedi Lukasi	Tadamon Sour	6
2	(Lebanon) Jeme Kazan	Jwaya	3
2	(Lebanon) Mohamad Omar Sadek	Tripoli	3

== See also ==
- 2026–27 Lebanese FA Cup
- 2026 Lebanese Super Cup
