= 2015–16 Lebanese FA Cup =

Tournament details
- Country: Lebanon
- Dates: 16 October 2015 – 5 June 2016
- Teams: 27

Final positions
- Champions: Nejmeh
- Runners-up: Ahed

Tournament statistics
- Matches played: 25
- Goals scored: 86 (3.44 per match)

The 2015–16 Lebanese FA Cup was the 44th edition of the national football cup competition of Lebanon. It started with the First Round on 16 October 2015 and concluded with the final on 5 June 2016.

Defending champions Tripoli lost to Nejmeh on penalty shoot-out in the quarter-finals; Nejmeh went on to win their sixth title. The winner qualified for the 2017 AFC Cup group stage.

== First round ==
16 October 2015	Zamalek Beirut (3)	3–4 (a.e.t.)	Bint Jbeil (3)	Beirut
13:45 (EEST)		Report		Stadium: Al Ahed Stadium

2 January 2016	Akhaa Ahli Aley (2)	3–2	Tadamon Sour (2)	Beirut
		Report		Stadium: Safa Stadium

2 January 2016	Homenetmen (2)	2–2 (a.e.t.) (2–4 p)	Shabiba Mazraa (2)	Beirut
		Report		Stadium: Al Ahed Stadium

2 January 2016	Riada Wal Adab (2)	0–2	Islah Borj Shmali (2)	Beirut
		Report		Stadium: Al Ansar Stadium

2 January 2016	Ahli Nabatieh (2)	2–1	Amal Salam Zgharta (2)	Beirut
		Report		Stadium: Rafic Hariri Stadium

3 January 2016	Amal Maaraka (2)	2–1	Mabarra (2)	Kfar Jouz, Nabatieh
		Report		Stadium: Kfarjoz Municipal Stadium

3 January 2016	Ahli Saida (2)	4–2 (a.e.t.)	Hilal Haret Naameh (2)	Beirut
		Report		Stadium: Safa Stadium

== Second round ==
9 January 2016	Akhaa Ahli Aley (2)	3–0	Shabiba Mazraa (2)	Beirut
		Report		Stadium: Rafic Hariri Stadium

10 January 2016	Ahli Saida (2)	1–2	Islah Borj Shmali (2)	Kfar Jouz, Nabatieh
		Report		Stadium: Kfarjoz Stadium

13 January 2016	Bint Jbeil (3)	1–4	Amal Maaraka (2)	Kfar Jouz, Nabatieh
		Report		Stadium: Kfarjoz Stadium

== Round of 16 ==
22 January 2016	Shabab Bourj (3)	0–2	Egtmaaey Tripoli (1)	Beirut
		Report		Stadium: Safa Stadium

23 January 2016	Sagesse (1)	1–7	Ansar (1)	Beirut
12:30 EET		Report		Stadium: Al Ahed Stadium

23 January 2016	Chabab Ghazieh (1)	0–2	Egtmaaey Tripoli (1)	Beirut
12:30 EET		Report		Stadium: Safa Stadium

24 January 2016	Tripoli (1)	2–0	Akhaa Ahli Aley (2)	Beirut
12:30 EET		Report		Stadium: Safa Stadium

24 January 2016	Nejmeh (1)	2–1	Salam Zgharta (1)	Tripoli
12:30 EET		Report		Stadium: Tripoli Municipal Stadium

24 January 2016	Islah Borj Shmali (2)	2–4	Safa (1)	Beirut
12:30 EET		Report		Stadium: Al Ahed Stadium

24 January 2016	Nabi Chit (1)	0–2	Ahed (1)	Sidon
12:30 EET		Report		Stadium: Saida Municipal Stadium

24 January 2016	Racing Beirut (1)	5–0	Ahli Nabatieh (2)	Bhamdoun
12:30 EET		Report		Stadium: Amin Abdelnour Stadium

== Quarter-finals ==
30 January 2016	Racing Beirut (1)	1–1 (a.e.t.) (2−3 p)	Egtmaaey Tripoli (1)	Beirut
12:30 EET		Report		Stadium: Al Ahed Stadium

30 January 2016	Nejmeh (1)	1–1 (a.e.t.) (4−2 p)	Tripoli (1)	Zgharta
14:10 EET		Report		Stadium: Zgharta Sports Complex

31 January 2016	Ansar (1)	2–0	Safa (1)	Beirut
14:10 EET		Report		Stadium: Bourj Hammoud Stadium

31 January 2016	Ahed (1)	3–1	Shabab Sahel (1)	Sidon
14:10 EET		Report		Stadium: Sidon International Stadium

== Semi-finals ==
30 May 2016	Ansar (1)	1–2	Ahed (1)	Beirut
15:45 EEST		Report		Stadium: Bourj Hammoud Stadium

31 May 2016	Nejmeh (1)	2–0	Egtmaaey Tripoli (1)	Beirut
		Report		Stadium: Bourj Hammoud Stadium

== Final ==
5 June 2016	Nejmeh (1)	0–0 (5−4 p)	Ahed (1)	Beirut
15:45 EEST		Report		Stadium: Bourj Hammoud Stadium
