= Ahmad Taktouk =

Lebanese footballer (born 1984)

- Taktouk with Shabab Bourj in 2021

Personal information
- Full name: Ahmad Walid Taktouk
- Date of birth: 29 September 1984 (age 42)
- Place of birth: Beirut, Lebanon
- Height: 1.88 m (6 ft 2 in)
- Position: Goalkeeper

Team information
- Current team: Mabarra
- Number: 21

Senior career*
Years	Team	Apps	(Gls)
–2014	Akhaa Ahli Aley		
2014–2018	Nejmeh	34	(0)
2017–2018	→ Bekaa (loan)	9	(0)
2018–2019	Safa	20	(0)
2019–2022	Nejmeh	0	(0)
2021–2022	→ Shabab Bourj (loan)	15	(0)
2022–2023	Sagesse	16	(0)
2023–2024	Tripoli	6	(0)
2024–	Mabarra	27	(0)

International career
2014–2015	Lebanon	2	(0)
- * Club domestic league appearances and goals as of 29 June 2026

Ahmad Walid Taktouk (Arabic: أحمد وليد تكتوك, Lebanese Arabic pronunciation: [ˈʔaħmad takˈtuːk]; born 29 September 1984) is a Lebanese footballer who plays as a goalkeeper for Lebanese Premier League club Mabarra.

== Club career ==
Taktouk began his senior career with Akhaa Ahli Aley, for whom he was playing by February 2007. He scored a penalty in the club's 3–1 defeat to Bourj in the 2006–07 Lebanese FA Cup. He remained with Akhaa for the following seasons and was established as the club's goalkeeper by the early 2010s.

In July 2014, Taktouk signed for Nejmeh from Akhaa Ahli Aley. He became Nejmeh's first-choice goalkeeper and won the Lebanese FA Cup in the 2015–16 season. In the summer of 2017, he moved to Bekaa on loan after the arrival of Abbas Hassan at Nejmeh, and returned to Nejmeh after the 2017–18 season.

Taktouk joined Safa for the 2018–19 season and became the club's first-choice goalkeeper during the campaign. He returned to Nejmeh in 2019 and was included in the club's official squad for the 2019–20 season. He subsequently won the Lebanese Elite Cup with Nejmeh in 2021. He was loaned to Shabab Bourj for the 2021–22 season on 21 August 2021.

In August 2022, Taktouk left Nejmeh and began training with Sagesse. He made his Sagesse debut in the 2022–23 Lebanese Premier League, including a clean sheet in a 0–0 draw with Shabab Sahel in September 2022.

After one season with Sagesse, Taktouk joined Tripoli for the 2023–24 season. He later joined Mabarra, and remained with the club for the 2025–26 season.

== International career ==
Taktouk made his senior international debut for Lebanon on 19 February 2014, coming on as a substitute in the 86th minute for Lary Mehanna in a 3–1 friendly victory over Pakistan. He made his second appearance on 24 May 2015, replacing Hassan Bittar at half-time in a 2–2 friendly draw with Syria.

Although he did not make another appearance for Lebanon, Taktouk continued to receive call-ups. His last documented call-up before the Asian Cup came in March 2017. He was selected for Lebanon's squad at the 2019 AFC Asian Cup, where he was one of the team's three goalkeepers.

== Honours ==
Nejmeh

- Lebanese FA Cup: 2015–16
- Lebanese Elite Cup: 2016, 2021
- Lebanese Super Cup: 2016
- Lebanese FA Cup runner-up: 2020–21
- Lebanese Super Cup runner-up: 2021
