= 2016–17 Lebanese FA Cup =

Tournament details
- Country: Lebanon
- Dates: 17 September 2016 – 7 May 2017
- Teams: 24

Final positions
- Champions: Ansar
- Runners-up: Safa

Tournament statistics
- Matches played: 23
- Goals scored: 87 (3.78 per match)

The 2016–17 Lebanese FA Cup was the 45th edition of the national football cup competition of Lebanon. It started with the First Round on 17 September 2016 and concluded with the final on 7 May 2017.

Defending champions Nejmeh lost to Safa in the semi-finals. Ansar went on to win their 14th title, qualifying for the 2018 AFC Cup group stage.

== First round ==
17 September 2016	Shabab Arabi (2)	3–2	Sagesse (2)	Beirut
		Report		Stadium: Al Ahed Stadium

18 September 2016	Islah Borj Shmali (2)	1–2	Ahli Saida (2)	Kfar Jouz, Nabatieh
		Report		Stadium: Kfarjoz Municipal Stadium

18 September 2016	Chabab Ghazieh (2)	5–0	Shabiba Mazraa (2)	Beirut
		Report		Stadium: Al Ahed Stadium

18 September 2016	Nasser Bar Elias (2)	0–3	Homenetmen (2)	Bhamdoun
		Report		Stadium: Amin Abdelnour Stadium

18 September 2016	Amal Maaraka (2)	4–1	Ahli Nabatieh (2)	Babliyeh
		Report		Stadium: Babliyeh Stadium

18 September 2016	Mabarra (2)	3–0	Riada Wal Adab (2)	Beirut
		Report		Stadium: Safa Stadium

== Second round ==
12 November 2016	Shabab Arabi (2)	3–1	Amal Maaraka (2)	Beirut
		Report		Stadium: Al Ahed Stadium

12 November 2016	Mabarra (2)	3–2	Chabab Ghazieh (2)	Beirut
		Report		Stadium: Safa Stadium

== Round of 16 ==
16 December 2016	Ahli Saida (2)	0–1	Tripoli (1)	Beirut
13:30 (EEST)		Report		Stadium: Safa Stadium

16 December 2016	Tadamon Sour (1)	1–2	Shabab Sahel (1)	Beirut
13:30 (EEST)		Report		Stadium: Al Ahed Stadium

17 December 2016	Mabarra (2)	2–4	Racing Beirut (1)	Beirut
13:30 (EEST)		Report		Stadium: Safa Stadium

17 December 2016	Salam Zgharta (1)	3–1	Bekaa (1)	Beirut
13:30 (EEST)		Report		Stadium: Al Ahed Stadium

17 December 2016	Egtmaaey Tripoli (1)	0–1	Ansar (1)	Tripoli
16:00 (EEST)		Report		Stadium: Tripoli Municipal Stadium

18 December 2016	Homenetmen (2)	2–5	Nejmeh (1)	Tripoli
16:00 (EEST)		Report		Stadium: Tripoli Municipal Stadium

18 December 2016	Shabab Arabi (2)	1–3	Safa (1)	Beirut
16:00 (EEST)		Report		Stadium: Al Ahed Stadium

11 March 2017	Akhaa Ahli Aley (1)	0–2	Ahed (1)	Sidon
13:00 (EEST)		Report		Stadium: Saida Municipal Stadium

== Quarter-finals ==
6 January 2017	Tripoli (1)	0–1	Nejmeh (1)	Zgharta
15:00 (EEST)		Report		Stadium: Zgharta Sports Complex

7 January 2017	Shabab Sahel (1)	3–3 (a.e.t.) (3–4 p)	Ansar (1)	Sidon
15:00 (EEST)		Report		Stadium: Saida Municipal Stadium

8 January 2017	Safa (1)	3–2	Racing Beirut (1)	Beirut
13:30 (EEST)		Report		Stadium: Al Ahed Stadium

18 March 2017	Ahed (1)	3–1	Salam Zgharta (1)	Sidon
15:00 (EEST)		Report		Stadium: Saida Municipal Stadium

== Semi-finals ==
19 March 2017	Safa (1)	4–1	Nejmeh (1)	Sidon
15:00 (EEST)		Report		Stadium: Saida Municipal Stadium

1 April 2017	Ahed (1)	2–2 (a.e.t.) (6–7 p)	Ansar (1)	Beirut
15:00 (EEST)		Report		Stadium: Bourj Hammoud Stadium

== Final ==
7 May 2017	Safa (1)	0–1	Ansar (1)	Sidon
16:30 (EEST)		Report		Stadium: Saida Municipal Stadium
