= Mohamed Mahdi Sabbah =

Lebanese footballer (born 2002)

Personal information
- Full name: Mohamed Mahdi Mahmoud Sabbah
- Date of birth: 20 May 2002 (age 24)
- Place of birth: Abidjan, Ivory Coast
- Height: 1.78 m (5 ft 10 in)
- Position: Winger

Team information
- Current team: Ansar
- Number: 30

Youth career
- –2021: EFSA

Senior career*
Years	Team	Apps	(Gls)
2021–2022	Menemenspor	22	(3)
2023–2024	ENAD Polis Chrysochous	28	(4)
2024–2026	Mouna		(4)
2026–	Ansar	1	(1)

International career
2023	Lebanon U23	2	(0)
- * Club domestic league appearances and goals as of 21 November 2026

Mohamed Mahdi Mahmoud Sabbah (Arabic: محمد مهدي محمود صباح; born 20 May 2002) is a footballer who plays as a winger for Lebanese Premier League club Ansar. Born in the Ivory Coast, he played for the Lebanon national under-23 team.

== Club career ==
=== Early career ===
Sabbah played youth football in Abidjan, Ivory Coast, with Ecole de Football Samandje d'Aby (EFSA).

=== Menemenspor ===
In August 2021, Sabbah moved to Turkey, joining TFF 1. Lig club Menemenspor on a three-year contract. He played regularly in the first half of the season, scoring three goals against Adanaspor, Eyüpspor and Kocaelispor, in 16 appearances. He did not feature in Menemenspor's first 10 matches of 2022, having last played in December 2021. On 10 April, he returned to the team as a 63rd-minute substitute in a 3–1 home defeat to İstanbulspor.

Sabbah finished the 2021–22 season with three goals in 22 appearances. His contract was terminated by mutual agreement in May 2022.

=== ENAD Polis Chrysochous ===
After spending the 2022–23 season without a club, Sabbah joined Cypriot club ENAD Polis Chrysochous. He made 28 appearances and scored four goals in the 2023–24 Cypriot Second Division.

=== Mouna ===
In summer 2024, Sabbah returned to Ivory Coast and joined Mouna. He scored his first goal for the club in a 2–1 victory over SOA on 29 September 2024. Sabbah scored four goals throughout the 2024–25 Ligue 1 season. He remained with Mouna for the 2025–26 season.

=== Ansar ===
In August 2026, Sabbah joined Ansar ahead of the 2026–27 Lebanese Premier League. On 19 September, he scored his first goal for Ansar in a 2–0 win over Mabarra in the 2026–27 Lebanese FA Cup. On 21 November, he scored a last-minute goal in a 1–1 league draw against Safa.

== International career ==
Sabbah was called up to the Lebanon national under-23 team for several friendly matches in 2023, scoring against Indonesia. He was subsequently included in Lebanon's squads for the 2023 WAFF U-23 Championship, in which he played two games, and the 2023 Pan Arab Games.

== Career statistics ==
As of match played 21 November 2026

Appearances and goals by club, season and competition
Club	Season	League			National cup (Note: Includes Turkish Cup, Cypriot Cup, Coupe de Côte d'Ivoire, Lebanese FA Cup)		Continental		Total	
Club	Season	Division	Apps	Goals	Apps	Goals	Apps	Goals	Apps	Goals
Menemenspor	2021–22	TFF 1. Lig	22	3	2	0	—		24	3
ENAD Polis Chrysochous	2023–24	Cypriot Second Division	28	4	1	0	—		29	4
Mouna	2024–25	Ligue 1		4		1	—			5
Mouna	2025–26	Ligue 1		0		0	—			0
Mouna	Total			4		1	0	0		5
Ansar	2026–27	Lebanese Premier League	1	1	3	1	2	0	6	2
Career total			51+	12	6+	2	2	2	59+	14
