= Ali El Atat =

Lebanese footballer

Personal information
- Full name: Ali Fouad El Atat
- Date of birth: 9 October 1984 (age 42)
- Place of birth: Shmustar, Lebanon
- Height: 1.77 m (5 ft 10 in)
- Position: Defensive midfielder

Team information
- Current team: Sporting
- Number: 98

Senior career*
Years	Team	Apps	(Gls)
2003–2011	Mabarra		(6)
2011–2014	Ahed	58	(3)
2014–2016	Nabi Chit	37	(0)
2016–2018	Ansar	27	(1)
2018–2019	Shabab Sahel	17	(0)
2020–2021	Sagesse		(1)
2021	Racing Beirut		(1)
2021–	Sporting	2	(0)

International career
2004–2010	Lebanon	22	(0)
- * Club domestic league appearances and goals as of 15:13, 19 September 2021 (UTC)

Ali Fouad El Atat (Arabic: عَلِيّ فُؤَاد الْأَتَات; born 9 October 1984) is a Lebanese footballer who plays as a defensive midfielder for Lebanese Third Division club Sporting.

In 2003 El Atat began his senior career at Mabarra, winning the Lebanese FA Cup in 2008, before signing for Ahed in 2011, with whom he won two Lebanese Elite Cups and one Lebanese Super Cup. In 2014 El Atat joined Nabi Chit, before moving to Ansar two years later. In his first season with Ansar, he won the FA Cup. In 2018 El Atat joined Shabab Sahel, before rescinding his contract after only one season. El Atat then played for Sagesse, Racing Beirut and Sporting.

El Atat represented Lebanon internationally between 2006 and 2010, playing 22 games.

== Club career ==
El Atat began his senior career at Lebanese Premier League club Mabarra. He helped Mabarra win their first Lebanese FA Cup in 2007–08. El Atat remained at Mabarra for eight seasons, scoring six goals. In 2011 El Atat moved to Ahed, where he promptly won both the 2011 Lebanese Elite Cup and 2011 Lebanese Super Cup in his first season at the club. El Atat also helped Ahed win the 2013 Lebanese Elite Cup.

In 2014 El Atat joined Nabi Chit, where he stayed for two seasons, scoring one goal in 27 league appearances. On 16 June 2016, El Atat officially joined Ansar. In his first season at the club, El Atat helped Ansar lift the 2016–17 Lebanese FA Cup. After two seasons at the club, on 11 July 2018, El Atat joined newly promoted side Shabab Sahel. He played 17 league games during the 2018–19 season. Following the end of the season, El Atat rescinded his contract with Shabab Sahel, citing financial issues with the club.

On 21 June 2021, El Atat moved to Racing Beirut in the Lebanese Second Division. On 30 August 2021, he joined newly promoted Premier League side Sporting.

== International career ==
El Atat made his international debut for Lebanon on 27 January 2006, in a friendly against Saudi Arabia; Lebanon won 2–1 away from home. The player made two appearances during the 2010 FIFA World Cup qualifiers. El Atat played 22 games for Lebanon between 2004 and 2010.

== Honours ==
Mabarra

- Lebanese FA Cup: 2007–08

Ahed

- Lebanese Elite Cup: 2011, 2013
- Lebanese Super Cup: 2011

Ansar

- Lebanese FA Cup: 2016–17

Individual

- Lebanese Premier League Best Young Player: 2002–03
