= 2008–09 Lebanese Premier League =

Lebanese Premier League
- Season: 2008–09
- Champions: Al Nejmeh
- Runner up: Al-Ahed
- Relegated: Salam Zgharta; Tripoli SC
- Goals: 288
- Top goalscorer: (Iraq) Salih Sadir (27)
- Biggest home win: Nejmeh 2–0 Shabab Al-Ghazieh
- Biggest away win: Tadamon Sour 1–4 Al-Mabarrah
- Highest scoring: Tadamon Sour 1–4 Al-Mabarrah

The 2008–09 Lebanese Premier League is the 48th season of Lebanon's football league. The league kicked off on October 11, 2008, Safa SC defeated Salam Zgharta at the opener. In that game, Mohammad Kassas scored the first goal of the season for Safa.

Al Ahed is the defending champion. Salam Zgharta and Shahab Al-Ghazieh promoted from the second division.

Prior to the start, Tripoli SC announced its withdrawal due to several problems. Lebanese Football Federation confirmed the withdrawal on October 9, the league is going to resume with 11 teams.

Due to the restructuring of Asian competitions, Lebanese teams were entered into the AFC Cup. The Arab Champions League on the other hand would not be played.

== Teams ==
Al-Irshad and Al-Ahli Sidon were relegated to the second level of Lebanese football after ending the 2007–08 season in the bottom two places. Promoted from the second level were Salam Zgharta and Shabab Al-Ghazieh.

=== Stadia and Locations ===
Locations of teams in the 2008–09 Lebanese Premier League

Club	City	Stadium
Al Ahed	Beirut	Municipal Stadium
Al Ansar	Beirut	Sports City
Nejmeh	Beirut	Sports City
Al Mabarrah	Beirut	Municipal Stadium
Safa Sporting Club	Beirut	Safa Stadium
Shabab Al-Sahel	Beirut	Municipal Stadium
Tripoli SC	Tripoli	Olympic Stadium
Tadamon Sour	Tyre	Sour Stadium
Racing Beirut	Beirut	Fouad Shehab Stadium
Hekmeh FC	Beirut	Fouad Shehab Stadium
Salam Zgharta	Zgharta	Zgharta Stadium
Shabab Al-Ghazieh	Sidon	Saida Municipal Stadium

== Managerial changes ==
Team	Outgoing manager	Manner of departure	Replaced by
Al Ansar	(Wales) Roy Thomas	Sacked	(Lebanon) Jamal Taha

== Final standings ==
Pos	Team	Pld	W	D	L	GF	GA	GD	Pts	Qualification or relegation
1	Nejmeh	20	16	2	2	44	14	+30	50	2010 AFC Cup qualification
2	Al Ahed	20	15	4	1	45	22	+23	49	2010 AFC Cup qualification as cup winners
3	Safa SC	20	12	4	4	35	15	+20	40	
4	Al-Ansar	20	10	6	4	25	17	+8	36	
5	Shabab Al-Sahel	20	7	9	4	29	26	+3	30	
6	Al-Mabarrah	20	6	8	6	24	21	+3	26	
7	Racing Beirut	20	5	4	11	19	25	−6	19	
8	Tadamon Sour	20	4	3	13	20	37	−17	15	
9	Hekmeh FC	20	3	5	12	14	30	−16	14	
10	Shabab Al-Ghazieh	20	4	2	14	19	37	−18	14	
11	Salam Zgharta	20	2	5	13	14	44	−30	11	Relegation to the Lebanese Second Division
12	Tripoli SC	0	-	-	-	-	-	—	0 (Note: Tripoli SC withdraw from the league. On October 14, 2008, the Lebanese Federation decided that Tripoli is going to relegate in the second league. Furthermore, the club was fined £L15 million for its withdrawal.)	Relegation to the Lebanese Second Division

Rules for classification: 1st points; 2nd head-to-head; 3rd goal difference; 4th goals scored

== Top scorers ==
Rank	Name	Club	Goals
1	(Iraq) Salih Sadir	Al-Ahed	27
2	(Lebanon) Mohammad Kassas	Safa	16
3	(Egypt) Ahmad Jaradi	Shabab Al-Sahel	8
4	(Lebanon) Ali Nasseredine	Nejmeh	7
5	(Lebanon) Akram Moghrabi	Nejmeh	6
	(Brazil) Tomi Jyakomilli	Nejmeh	6
6	(Lebanon) Zakaria Charara	Nejmeh	5
