= 2017 Lebanese Elite Cup =

Lebanese Elite Cup
- Season: 2017
- Champions: Al-Nejmeh
- Matches: 9
- Goals: 33 (3.67 per match)

The 2017 Lebanese Elite Cup is the 20th edition of this football tournament in Lebanon. The competition started on 4 August through to the final on 20 August. This tournament included the six best teams from the 2016–17 Lebanese Premier League season.

== Group stage ==
=== Group A ===
Team	Pld	W	D	L	GF	GA	GD	Pts
(Lebanon) Al Ahed	2	2	0	0	6	1	+5	6
(Lebanon) Safa	2	1	0	1	2	3	-1	3
(Lebanon) Salam Zgharta	2	0	0	2	1	5	−4	0

4 August 2017
Group Stages

Al Ahed	3–1	Salam Zgharta
	Report

Safa Stadium, Beirut
8 August 2017
Group Stages

Al Ahed	3–0	Safa
	Report

Amin Abdelnour Stadium, Bhamdoun
12 August 2017
Group Stages

Salam Zgharta	0–2	Safa
	Report

Beirut Municipal Stadium, Beirut

=== Group B ===
Team	Pld	W	D	L	GF	GA	GD	Pts
(Lebanon) Nejmeh	2	2	0	0	7	2	+5	6
(Lebanon) Ansar	2	1	0	1	6	5	+1	3
(Lebanon) Nabi Sheet	2	0	0	2	2	8	−6	0

4 August 2017
Group Stages

Ansar	2–3	Nejmeh
	Report	Maatouk

Tripoli Municipal Stadium, Tripoli
8 August 2017
Group Stages

Ansar	4–2	Nabi Sheet
	Report

Beirut Municipal Stadium, Beirut
12 August 2017
Group Stages

Nejmeh	4–0	Nabi Sheet
Maatouk	Report

Amin Abdelnour Stadium, Bhamdoun

== Final stage ==
Semi-finals
16 August - Bhamdoun
Al Ahed	1
Ansar	0
16 August - Tripoli
Nejmeh	3
Safa	1

Final
20 August - Beirut
Al Ahed	2 (5)
Nejmeh	2 (6)

=== Semi finals ===
16 August 2017
13:00
Semifinals

Al Ahed	1–0	Ansar
	Report

Amin Abdelnour Stadium, Bhamdoun

16 August 2017
Semifinals

Nejmeh	3–1 (a.e.t.)	Safa
Maatouk	Report

Tripoli Municipal Stadium, Tripoli

=== Final ===
20 August 2017
Final

Al Ahed	2–2 (a.e.t.)	Nejmeh
	Report
Penalties
	5–6

Saida Municipal Stadium, Sidon
