= 2010–11 Lebanese FA Cup =

Tournament details
- Country: Lebanon
- Teams: 16

Final positions
- Champions: Al Ahed
- Runners-up: Safa

Tournament statistics
- Matches played: 14
- Goals scored: 36 (2.57 per match)

The 2011 edition of the Lebanese FA Cup was the 39th edition to be played. It is the premier knockout tournament for football teams in Lebanon.

Al-Ansar went into this edition as the holders. Al Ansar holds the most wins with 12 titles.

The cup winner were guaranteed a place in the 2012 AFC Cup.

== Round 1 ==
16 teams play a knockout tie. 8 clubs advance to the next round. Ties played between 14 and 18 January 2011.

Team 1	Score	Team 2
14 January 2011
Salam Sour	0 – 4	Shabab Al-Sahel
15 January 2011
Racing Beirut	1 – 2	Al-Mabarrah
Mahabba Trables	0 – 4	Al Ansar
16 January 2011
Tadamon Sour	0 – 1	Al Ikhaa Al Ahli
Safa	0 – 0; 3 - 2p	Al Islah Bourg Shamaly
Al Nejmeh	3 – 0	Shbab Trables
18 January 2011
Tadamon Beirut	0 – 2	Salam Zgharta
Al Ahed	2 – 1	Shabab Al-Ghazieh

== Quarter-finals ==
Team 1	Score	Team 2
22 January 2011
Al Nejmeh	0 – 1	Safa
23 January 2011
Al Ikhaa Al Ahli	1 – 5	Al Ahed
Shabab Al-Sahel	2 – 0	Salam Zgharta
25 January 2011
Al Ansar	(w/o) ^{1}	Al-Mabarrah

^{1} Match awarded to Al Ansar, Al-Mabarrah apparently withdrew.

== Semi-finals ==
Team 1	Score	Team 2
7 April 2011
Safa	1 – 0	Al Ansar
8 April 2011
Al Ahed	2 – 1	Shabab Al-Sahel

== Final ==
Team 1	Score	Team 2
7 April 2011
Safa	0 – 3	Al Ahed
