= Jimmy Kazan =

Lebanese footballer (born 2007)

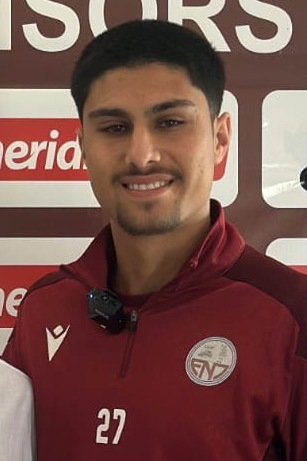
- Kazan with Enosis Neon Paralimni in 2026

Personal information
- Full name: Jeme Jihad Kazan
- Date of birth: 26 March 2007 (age 19)
- Place of birth: Raiit, Lebanon
- Height: 1.86 m (6 ft 1 in)
- Positions: Winger; forward

Team information
- Current team: Jwaya
- Number: 27

Youth career
- 2021–2022: Adab w Riyada Kfarshima
- 2022–2025: Racing Beirut

Senior career*
Years	Team	Apps	(Gls)
2023–2025	Racing Beirut	29	(8)
2025–2026	Enosis Neon Paralimni	25	(0)
2026–	Jwaya	2	(2)

International career^{‡}
2026–	Lebanon U20	6	(2)
2026–	Lebanon	3	(0)
- * Club domestic league appearances and goals as of 13 October 2026 ‡ National team caps and goals as of 4 October 2026

Jeme Jihad Kazan (Arabic: جيمي جهاد قازان; born 26 March 2007), known as Jimmy Kazan, is a Lebanese professional footballer who plays as a winger or forward for Lebanese Premier League club Jwaya and the Lebanon national team.

== Club career ==
=== Racing Beirut ===
Kazan started playing football aged 14 in the youth sector of Lebanese Fourth Division club Adab w Riyada Kfarshima. He then moved to Racing Beirut's youth system, making his senior debut in the 2023–24 Lebanese Premier League on 28 September 2023, aged 16 years and 186 days, as a 78th-minute substitute in a 1–1 draw against Nejmeh. His first goal came on 20 June 2024, in the final matchday of the season, in a 2–1 defeat to Bourj.

Kazan's breakthrough season came in 2024–25, in which he was used by Racing as a starter. He scored three consecutive goals between 8 and 19 May 2025 – against Bourj, Chabab Ghazieh, and Shabab Sahel – and a brace against Bourj on 7 June 2025. Kazan finished the season with seven goals in 26 appearances. He was also crowned top scorer of the under-20 league with 13 goals.

=== Enosis Neon Paralimni ===
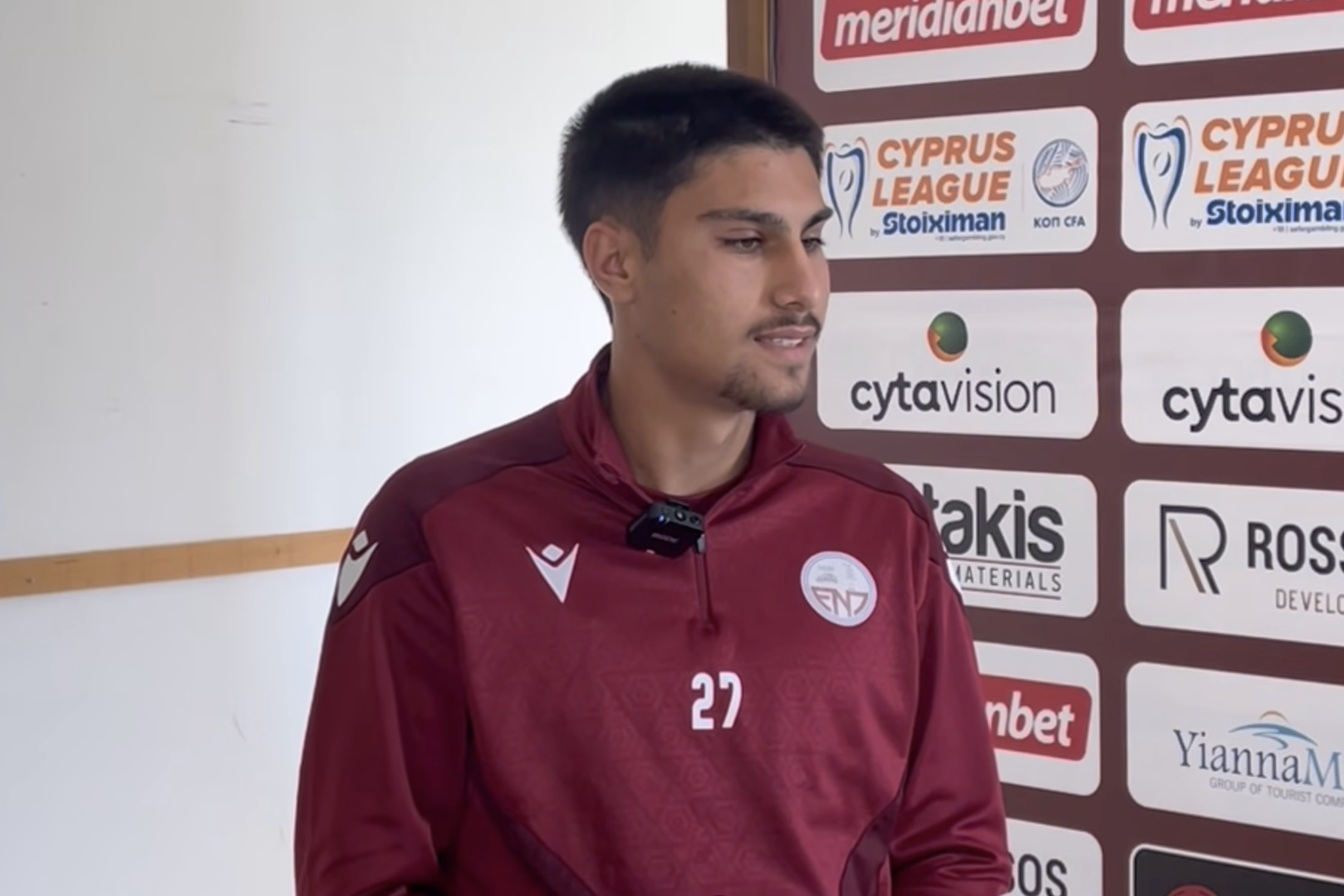
Kazan in an interview with Enosis Neon Paralimni in 2026

On 5 October 2025, Kazan joined Enosis Neon Paralimni in the Cypriot First Division during the 2025–26 season. He scored his only goal for the club on 22 October, in a 2–0 win against Chalkanoras Idaliou in the Cypriot Cup, two minutes after entering as a second-half substitute. Kazan finished the season with 25 league appearances and one goal in two cup appearances.

=== Jwaya ===
In summer 2026, Kazan signed a contract with a Portuguese club, but the transfer fell through after his visa application was rejected twice.

On 7 September 2026, Kazan returned to Lebanon, signing for Lebanese Premier League club Jwaya. The move was reported as being worth more than US$90,000, with a reported monthly salary of more than US$20,000. On 13 October, Kazan scored twice and contributed to an own goal in a 3–0 victory over Sagesse.

== International career ==
In September 2025, Kazan took part in a training camp with the Lebanon national under-20 team in Tabarja, Lebanon, ahead of the 2025 WAFF U-20 Championship. He subsequently made his under-20 debut in July 2026, playing four friendly games against Syria and Tajikistan in preparation for the 2027 AFC U-20 Asian Cup qualification. He scored once against Tajikistan. Kazan played both qualification games, scoring against South Korea, and helped Lebanon qualify for the final tournament.

Kazan received his first senior call-up to the Lebanon national team in May 2026, and made his debut as a second-half substitute in a 2027 Asian Cup qualification game against Yemen on 4 June, which Lebanon lost 2–0.

== Career statistics ==
=== Club ===
As of match played 13 October 2026

Appearances and goals by club, season and competition
Club	Season	League			National cup (Note: Includes Lebanese FA Cup, Cypriot Cup)		League cup (Note: Includes Lebanese Federation Cup)		Total	
Club	Season	Division	Apps	Goals	Apps	Goals	Apps	Goals	Apps	Goals
Racing Beirut	2023–24	Lebanese Premier League	3	1	0	0	0	0	3	1
Racing Beirut	2024–25	Lebanese Premier League	26	7	—		—		26	7
Racing Beirut	Total		29	8	0	0	0	0	29	8
Enosis Neon Paralimni	2025–26	Cypriot First Division	25	0	2	1	—		27	1
Jwaya	2026–27	Lebanese Premier League	2	2	2	1	—		4	3
Career total			56	10	4	2	0	0	60	12

=== International ===
As of match played 4 October 2026

Appearances and goals by national team and year
National team	Year	Apps	Goals
Lebanon	2026	3	0
Total		3	0
