= Andrew Sawaya =

Lebanese footballer (born 2000)

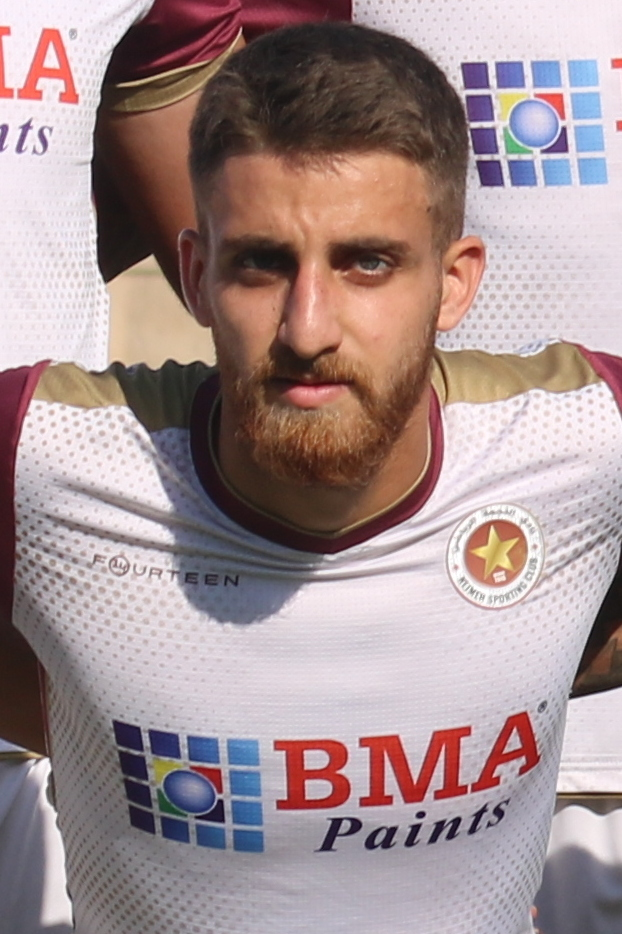
- Sawaya with Nejmeh in 2022

Personal information
- Full name: Andrew Kameel Sawaya
- Date of birth: 30 April 2000 (age 26)
- Place of birth: Dhour El Choueir, Lebanon
- Position: Right-back

Team information
- Current team: Safa
- Number: 33

Youth career
- 2005–2012: Al Ain
- 2012–2017: Athletico
- 2017–2018: Nejmeh

Senior career*
Years	Team	Apps	(Gls)
2018–2022	Nejmeh	36	(1)
2022–2023	Ahed	11	(0)
2023–	Safa	46	(0)

International career^{‡}
2017	Lebanon U19	2	(0)
2019–2021	Lebanon U23	4	(0)
2022	Lebanon	1	(0)
- * Club domestic league appearances and goals as of 13 September 2026 ‡ National team caps and goals as of 30 December 2022

Andrew Kameel Sawaya (Arabic: أندرو كميل صوايا; born 30 April 2000) is a Lebanese footballer who plays as a right-back for Lebanese Premier League club Safa.

== Club career ==
Born in Dhour El Choueir, Lebanon, Sawaya moved to the United Arab Emirates aged five, where he lived for seven years. During this time, he played for the academy of Al Ain. In 2012, he moved back to Lebanon, playing for the Athletico football academy for five years.

In July 2017, Sawaya joined Nejmeh, initially playing for both the youth and senior teams. He made one appearance in the 2017–18 Lebanese Premier League, on 15 April 2018, as a starter in a 3–1 defeat to Ahed. Sawaya scored against cross-city rivals Ansar in the 2021–22 league season, to help Nejmeh win 1–0.

On 13 June 2022, Sawaya moved to Ahed on a free contract. After one season, Sawaya moved to Safa on 13 May 2023, also based in Beirut.

== International career ==
Sawaya represented Lebanon internationally at youth level, and was called up to the senior team's training camp ahead of the 2022 FIFA World Cup qualifiers. He made his senior debut on 30 December 2022, in a 1–0 friendly defeat to the United Arab Emirates.

== Style of play ==
Sawaya initially started out as a forward and winger during his youth career; he later developed into a right-back. He has been likened to former Lebanese international Ali Hamam. Sawaya stated that he drew inspiration from former German international Philipp Lahm.

== Career statistics ==
=== International ===
As of match played 30 December 2022

Appearances and goals by national team and year
National team	Year	Apps	Goals
Lebanon	2022	1	0
Total		1	0

== Honours ==
Nejmeh

- Lebanese FA Cup: 2021–22; runner-up: 2017–18, 2020–21
- Lebanese Elite Cup: 2018, 2021
- Lebanese Super Cup runner-up: 2018, 2021

Ahed

- Lebanese Premier League: 2022–23
- Lebanese FA Cup runner-up: 2022–23
