= Al-Nahda Club =

Al-Nahda Club may refer to:

- Al-Nahda Club (Oman), an Omani sports club based in Al-Buraimi
- Al-Nahda Club (Saudi Arabia), a Saudi football club from Al-Khobar
- Al Nahda SC, a defunct Lebanese football club
