= Mohammad El Hayek =

Lebanese footballer (born 2000)

- El Hayek with Lebanon in 2024

Personal information
- Full name: Mohammad Hussein El Hayek
- Date of birth: 19 February 2000 (age 26)
- Place of birth: Sarafand, Lebanon
- Height: 1.79 m (5 ft 10 in)
- Position: Left-back

Team information
- Current team: Nejmeh
- Number: 3

Youth career
- –2019: Ahed

Senior career*
| Years | Team | Apps | (Gls) |
| 2019–2022 | Ahed | 12 | (0) |
| 2019–2020 | → Safa (loan) | 3 | (0) |
| 2022–2023 | Tadamon Sour | 18 | (0) |
| 2023–2024 | Bourj | 13 | (0) |
| 2024–2026 | Safa | 30 | (1) |
| 2026– | Nejmeh | 0 | (0) |
| 2026 | → Newroz (loan) | 18 | (0) |

International career^{‡}
| 2021 | Lebanon U23 | 6 | (0) |
| 2022– | Lebanon | 19 | (0) |
- * Club domestic league appearances and goals as of 01:44, 23 July 2026 (UTC) ‡ National team caps and goals as of 4 October 2026

Mohammad Hussein El Hayek (Arabic: محمد حسين الحايك; born 19 February 2000) is a Lebanese professional footballer who plays as a left-back for Lebanese Premier League club Nejmeh and the Lebanon national team.

== Club career ==
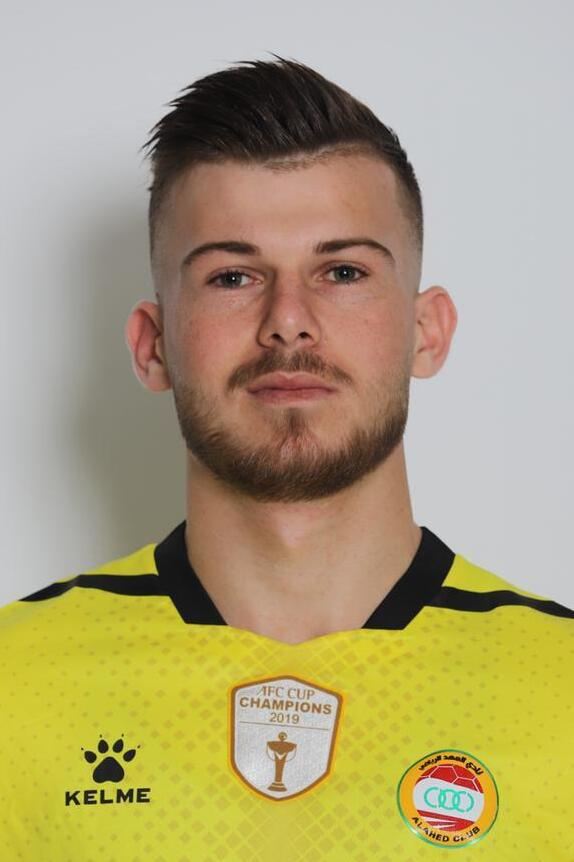
El Hayek with Ahed in 2021

El Hayek played for Ahed at the youth level. On 8 August 2019, Ahed loaned El Hayek to Safa for one season ahead of the 2019–20 Lebanese Premier League season.

He was reportedly sent on loan to Tadamon Sour for the 2022–23 season. However, the transfer was not registered as a loan because the Lebanese Football Association did not allow clubs to have more than three players on loan at the same time. Instead, El Hayek became a free agent during the 2022 summer transfer window and signed a one-year contract with Tadamon, with an agreement that he would return to Ahed in summer 2023.

In July 2023, El Hayek reportedly refused to sign for Ahed. He subsequently signed for Bourj on 18 July. Following the expiration of his contract with Bourj, El Hayek signed a three-year contract with Safa.

On 10 January 2026, El Hayek transferred from Safa to Nejmeh on a three-and-a-half-year contract, reportedly for a fee of $150,000. He was immediately loaned to Newroz of the Iraq Stars League for the remainder of the 2025–26 season. He returned to Nejmeh in August 2026 following the conclusion of his loan.

== International career ==
El Hayek represented Lebanon at under-23 level, playing at the 2021 WAFF U-23 Championship. He made his senior debut on 30 December 2022, in a 1–0 friendly defeat to the United Arab Emirates.

== Career statistics ==
=== International ===
As of match played 4 October 2026

Appearances and goals by national team and year
| National team | Year | Apps | Goals |
|---|---|---|---|
| Lebanon | 2022 | 1 | 0 |
| Lebanon | 2023 | 8 | 0 |
| Lebanon | 2024 | 5 | 0 |
| Lebanon | 2025 | 3 | 0 |
| Lebanon | 2026 | 2 | 0 |
| Total | | 19 | 0 |

== Honours ==
Ahed

- Lebanese Premier League: 2021–22
