= Sebastian Jakubiak =

German footballer

Personal information
- Date of birth: 21 June 1993 (age 33)
- Place of birth: Lübeck, Germany
- Height: 1.80 m (5 ft 11 in)
- Position: Midfielder

Team information
- Current team: Phönix Lübeck
- Number: 5

Youth career
- Hamburger SV

Senior career*
Years	Team	Apps	(Gls)
2011–2013	VfB Lübeck	22	(0)
2013–2015	FC St. Pauli II	54	(1)
2015–2017	SV Rödinghausen	46	(3)
2017–2020	Heracles Almelo	23	(1)
2020–2022	1. FC Magdeburg	28	(1)
2023	Septemvri Sofia	10	(0)
2024	Safa	12	(0)
2024–	Phönix Lübeck	3	(0)
- * Club domestic league appearances and goals as of 1 January 2025

Sebastian Jakubiak (born 21 June 1993) is a German professional footballer who plays as a midfielder for Regionalliga club Phönix Lübeck.

== Career ==
Jakubiak played for local side VfB Lübeck, for the FC St. Pauli reserves and German fourth-tier outfit SV Rödinghausen before moving abroad to play for Eredivisie club Heracles in summer 2017.

On 2 December 2017, Jakubiak scored only 13 seconds into his debut and with his first touch for the Dutch side against Willem II. In January 2023, Jakubiak joined Bulgarian First League club Septemvri Sofia.

== Career statistics ==
As of match played 1 August 2020

Appearances and goals by club, season and competition
Club	Season	League			National cup		Other		Total	
Club	Season	Division	Apps	Goals	Apps	Goals	Apps	Goals	Apps	Goals
VfB Lübeck	2011–12	Regionalliga Nord	7	0	—		—		7	0
VfB Lübeck	2012–13	Regionalliga Nord	15	0	0	0	—		15	0
VfB Lübeck	Total		22	0	0	0	0	0	22	0#
FC St. Pauli II	2013–14	Regionalliga Nord	28	0	—		—		28	0
FC St. Pauli II	2014–15	Regionalliga Nord	26	1	—		—		26	1
FC St. Pauli II	Total		54	1	—		0	0	54	1
SV Rödinghausen	2015–16	Regionalliga West	20	2	—		—		20	2
SV Rödinghausen	2016–17	Regionalliga West	26	1	—		—		26	1
SV Rödinghausen	Total		46	3	0	0	0	0	46	3
Heracles Almelo	2017–18	Eredivisie	18	1	1	0	0	0	19	1
Heracles Almelo	2017–18	Eredivisie	5	0	2	0	0	0	7	0
Heracles Almelo	Total		23	1	3	0	0	0	26	1
Career total			145	5	3	0	0	0	148	5

== Honours ==
1. FC Magdeburg

- 3. Liga: 2021–22
