= Arnold Suew =

German footballer (born 1991)

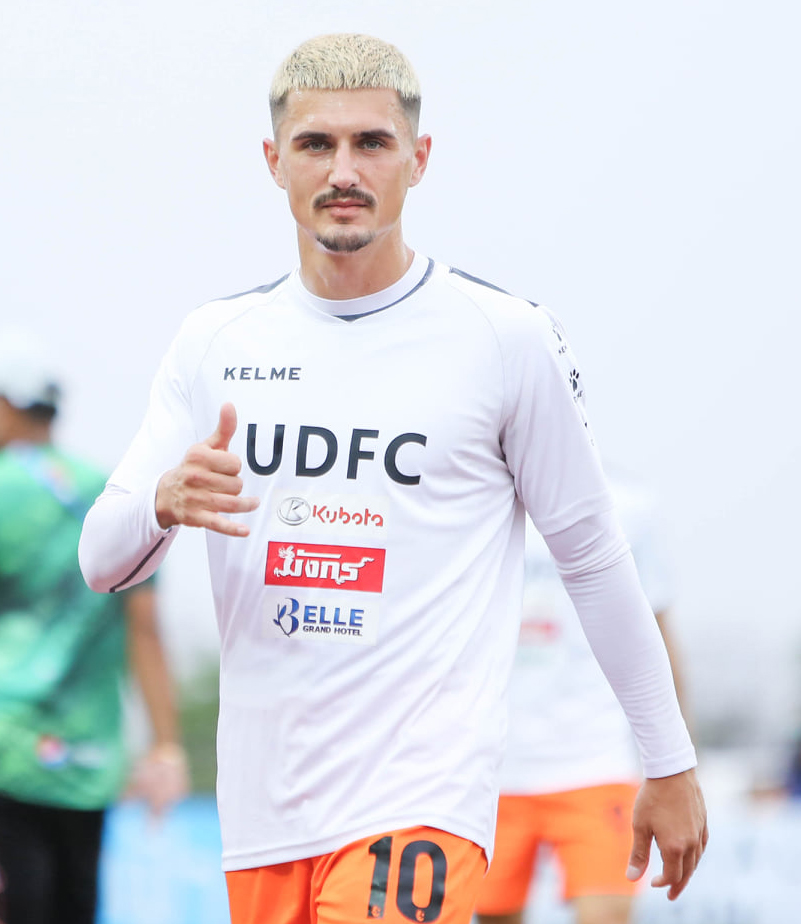

Personal information
- Date of birth: 12 September 1991 (age 35)
- Height: 1.79 m (5 ft 10 in)
- Positions: Winger; striker

Team information
- Current team: Pattaya United
- Number: 77

Senior career*
Years	Team	Apps	(Gls)
2010–2011	MSV Duisburg II	10	(1)
2011–2012	NTSV Strand 08	1	(0)
2013–2015	VfB Lübeck	34	(3)
2015–2016	BV Cloppenburg	23	(2)
2016–2017	NTSV Strand 08	34	(9)
2018	Greater Dandenong FC	5	(1)
2019	Bentleigh Greens SC	11	(3)
2019	Brunswick Juventus FC	17	(5)
2020	North Bangkok University FC		
2021–2023	Udon Thani FC	67	(16)
2023–2024	Safa	25	(3)
2024–2025	Chiangmai United	28	(4)
2026–	Pattaya United	0	(0)
- * Club domestic league appearances and goals

Arnold Suew (born 12 September 1991) is a German footballer who plays as a winger or striker for Thai League 2 club Pattaya United.

== Early life ==
Suew practiced karate as a child. He is of Kazakhstani descent.

== Career ==
In 2021, Suew signed for Thai side Udon Thani FC. He was the club's top scorer during the 2022–23 season with 11 goals. In 2023, he signed for Lebanese side Safa. He helped the club achieve qualification for the play-offs.

== Style of play ==
Suew mainly operates as a winger. He can also operate as a striker.

== Personal life ==
Suew was born in 1991. He is a native of Lübeck, Germany.
