= Mohamad Said Saad Stadium =

Football stadium in Jwaya, Lebanon

- ملعب محمد سعيد سعد
- Jwaya Stadium
- Interactive map of Mohamad Said Saad Stadium
- Location: Jwaya, Lebanon
- Coordinates: 33.247532°N 35.307526°E
- Owner: Saad family
- Operator: Jwaya SC
- Capacity: 7,000
- Surface: Artificial turf

Construction
- Opened: 2026

Tenant
- Jwaya SC

Mohamad Said Saad Stadium (Arabic: ملعب محمد سعيد سعد), also known as Jwaya Stadium (Arabic: ملعب جويّا), is a football stadium in Jwaya, Lebanon. It is the home ground of Jwaya SC and has a reported capacity of approximately 7,000 spectators. The stadium is named after the father of the Saad family, who purchased the land for the construction of the facility.

== History ==
The stadium was developed following Jwaya SC's promotion to the Lebanese Premier League for the 2025–26 season. The Saad family purchased an approximately 18,000-square-metre plot of land in Jwaya for the construction of a football stadium. The project was intended to provide the club with a dedicated ground and to meet the requirements of the Asian Football Confederation (AFC).

During construction, the stadium was inspected by officials of the Lebanese Football Association (LFA), including the association's stadiums committee and competitions committee. In January 2026, LFA officials reported that construction was progressing and that the stadium was being prepared to host official matches.

The stadium hosted Lebanese Premier League matches during the 2025–26 season. It also hosted women's football, including a Women's League Final Four match between Jwaya and No Limits on 22 February 2026. In July 2026, LFA secretary general Jihad Al-Shahaf visited the stadium to inspect its facilities and assess its readiness to host matches in the final stage of the Lebanese Premier League. The stadium was subsequently used during the final stage of the 2025–26 Lebanese Premier League. On 12 July 2026, Jwaya played Nejmeh SC there in the opening round of the championship round. The match was reported as the first football match played in southern Lebanon after the war.

In August 2026, the Lebanese Football Association was reported to be seeking AFC licensing for the stadium. AFC officials had given preliminary approval for the stadium to be used as the basis for club licensing, subject to completion of remaining requirements and a subsequent inspection.

== Facilities ==
The stadium was constructed on a site of approximately 18,000 square metres. Plans reported during construction included two opposing stands, VIP seating, changing rooms, parking facilities, floodlighting and other facilities intended to meet Asian football standards. The holds a reported capacity of 6,500 to 7,000 seats, including the east and west stands.

== See also ==
- List of football stadiums in Lebanon
