= 2016 Lebanese Elite Cup =

Lebanese Elite Cup
- Season: 2016
- Champions: Al-Nejmeh
- Matches: 9
- Goals: 25 (2.78 per match)

The 2016 Lebanese Elite Cup is the 19th edition of this football tournament in Lebanon. The competition started on 6 August through to the final on 21 August. This tournament includes the six best teams from the 2015–16 Lebanese Premier League season.

== Group stage ==
=== Group A ===
| Team | Pld | W | D | L | GF | GA | GD | Pts |
|---|---|---|---|---|---|---|---|---|
| (Lebanon) Safa | 2 | 1 | 1 | 0 | 3 | 1 | +2 | 4 |
| (Lebanon) Al Ahed | 2 | 1 | 0 | 1 | 5 | 3 | +2 | 3 |
| (Lebanon) Nabi Sheet | 2 | 0 | 1 | 1 | 2 | 6 | −4 | 1 |

5 August 2016
14:00

| Safa | 2 – 0 | Al Ahed |

Amin Abdelnour Stadium
9 August 2016
14:00

| Safa | 1 – 1 | Nabi Sheet |

Beirut Municipal Stadium
13 August 2016
14:00

| Al Ahed | 5 – 1 | Nabi Sheet |

Amin Abdelnour Stadium

=== Group B ===
| Team | Pld | W | D | L | GF | GA | GD | Pts |
|---|---|---|---|---|---|---|---|---|
| (Lebanon) Al Ansar | 2 | 1 | 1 | 0 | 5 | 2 | +3 | 4 |
| (Lebanon) Nejmeh | 2 | 1 | 1 | 0 | 4 | 3 | +1 | 4 |
| (Lebanon) Shabab Al-Sahel | 2 | 0 | 0 | 2 | 3 | 7 | −4 | 0 |

6 August 2016
14:00

| Nejmeh | 3 – 2 | Shabab Al-Sahel |

Amin Abdelnour Stadium
9 August 2016
14:00

| Nejmeh | 1 – 1 | Al Ansar |

Camille Chamoun Sports City Stadium
13 August 2016
14:00

| Shabab Al-Sahel | 1 – 4 | Al Ansar |

Beirut Municipal Stadium

== Final stage ==
Semi-finals
17 August - Beirut
Safa | 0
Nejmeh | 2
17 August - Bhamdoun
Al Ansar | 0 (9)
Al Ahed | 0 (8)

Final
21 August - Beirut
Al Ansar | 0
Nejmeh | 1

=== Semi finals ===
17 August 2016
13:00

| Safa | 0 – 2 | Nejmeh |

Camille Chamoun Sports City Stadium

17 August 2016
14:00

| Al Ansar | 0 – 0 (a.e.t.) | Al Ahed |
Penalties
| | 9–8 |

Amin Abdelnour Stadium

=== Final ===
21 August 2016
13:00

| Nejmeh | 1 – 0 (a.e.t.) | Al Ansar |

Camille Chamoun Sports City Stadium
