= Al Nahda SC =

Lebanese association football club

Nahda
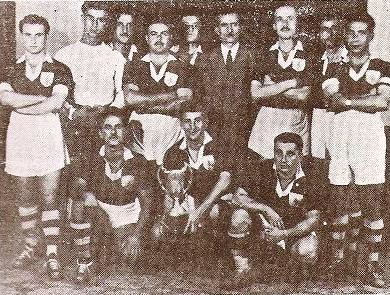
- Al Nahda holding the Lebanese FA Cup in 1945
- Full name: Al Nahda Sporting Club
- Nickname: Les Diables Noirs (The Black Devils)
- Founded: 3 February 1926; 100 years ago
- Dissolved: 1990s
- League: Lebanese Premier League
Home colours

Al Nahda Sporting Club (Arabic: نادي النهضة الرياضي), or Renaissance in French, was a football club based in the Mar Elias district of Beirut, Lebanon. Supported by the Orthodox community, they were founded in 1926 as Lebanon's first football club.

Nahda have won the inaugural Lebanese Premier League in 1933–34, as well as of the first edition of the Lebanese FA Cup in 1937–38. They are also the first team to have won a domestic double (1946–47), and have won a total of five league titles and four FA Cups. In the 1990s the club faced bankruptcy, and were forced to fold.

== History ==
Nahda was established on 3 February 1926, by Elias Nakhle Boutrous, Emile Raffoul Boutrous, and Elias Moubarak, as Lebanon's first ever football club. The club won the inaugural Lebanese Premier League in the 1933–34 season; their team consisted of: Elias Nakhle Boutrous, Edmond Rbeiz, Anis Al Lala, Emile Khoury, Georges Karam, Khalil Salmon, Georges Boukhazi, Gebran Boukhazi, Adel Sidani, Youssef Sidani, Jacques Chehab, Jimmy Chehab, Samir Sursuk, Avram Moussa, Elias Moubarak, Toufic Raffoul Boutrous, and Ibrahim Andraos.

Nahda also won the first edition of the Lebanese FA Cup in 1937–38. They are the first team to win a domestic double, in 1946–47. Between the 1930s and 1940s, Nahda won five league titles and four FA Cups.

In 1956 Al Nahda were relegated to the Lebanese Second Division after losing 10–0 on aggregate against Second Division winners Sagesse (9–0 and 0–1) in the play-off game held at the Beirut Municipal Stadium. They failed to gain promotion back to the Premier League, staying in the Second Division until the 1990s, when Nahda faced bankruptcy and were forced to fold.

== Stadium ==
Nahda established their stadium in 1927, in the Mar Elias district of Beirut, Lebanon. In 1930, the club added wooden stands for 2,000 fans. On 22 December 1946, the club's president Ibrahim Saad put the first cornerstone for a new stadium at the Al Manara district of Ras Beirut, Beirut. The stadium cost £L300,000, or around £stg.34,000.

== Chairmen history ==
Name	Years
Georges Al Roumi	1926–1927
Salim Raffoul Boutrous	1927–1928
Emile Khalil Boutrous	1928–1929
Bahij Salem	1929–1931
Georges Rubeiz	1931–1933
Michel Tedrous	1933–1934
Farid Ammoun	1934–1935
Jamil Sawaya	1936
Hassib Moussawer	1936–1940
Bahij Salem	1940–1944
Ibrahim Saad	1944–1990s

== Honours ==
=== Domestic ===
- Lebanese Premier League
  - Winners (5): 1933–34, 1941–42, 1942–43, 1946–47, 1948–49
- Lebanese FA Cup
  - Winners (4): 1937–38, 1940–41, 1944–45, 1946–47
  - Runners-up (1): 1942–43

== Bibliography ==
- Sakr, Ali Hamidi (1992). موسوعة كرة القدم اللبنانية 1991–1992 [1991–1992 Lebanese Football Encyclopedia] (PDF) (in Arabic). مؤسسة نوفل للتوزيع. ISBN 0000281247.
