= Kevin Quejada =

Colombian footballer (born 2002)

Personal information
- Full name: Kevin Stiven Quejada Lasso
- Date of birth: 15 October 2002 (age 24)
- Place of birth: Jamundí, Valle del Cauca, Colombia
- Height: 1.87 m (6 ft 2 in)
- Position: Forward

Team information
- Current team: Nejmeh
- Number: 9

Youth career
- Fútbol Paz
- 2020–2022: Grêmio

Senior career*
Years	Team	Apps	(Gls)
2022–2023	Grêmio	1	(0)
2022	→ São José (loan)	9	(1)
2023	→ Barracas Central (loan)	3	(0)
2023–2024	Llaneros	36	(10)
2024–2026	Feirense	9	(0)
2025	→ Cúcuta Deportivo (loan)	14	(2)
2026	→ Estudiantes de Mérida (loan)	19	(2)
2026	Al-Zawraa	2	(0)
2026–	Nejmeh	0	(0)
- * Club domestic league appearances and goals as of 12 September 2026

Kevin Stiven Quejada Lasso (born 15 October 2002) is a Colombian footballer who plays as a forward for Lebanese Premier League club Nejmeh.

== Club career ==
Born in Jamundí in the Valle del Cauca Department of Colombia, Quejada began his career with local academy Fútbol Paz. Having represented Grêmio's under-17 team in the Copa Santiago in January 2020, he signed a three-year contract with the Brazilian side in November of the same year.

In January 2022, he joined São José on loan ahead of the Campeonato Gaúcho. He scored his first and only goal for the club on 20 February, the second in an eventual 3–2 win against Internacional.

Following his return to Grêmio, he was included in the first-team squad for the first time ahead of a Série B match against Chapecoense in April 2022. He made his debut for the club in the 1–0 home loss on 15 April, before being subject to a loan approach from São José the following month, which was rejected by Grêmio. He would go on to make one further appearance for the club, coming on as a substitute for Janderson in Grêmio's 5–0 win against Glória in the 2022 Recopa Gaúcha.

In January 2023 he was linked with a move back to his native Colombia, with Unión Magdalena being touted as potential suitors for a loan deal. However, later in the same month, he joined Argentine Primera División side Barracas Central on a loan deal. In August 2023, following three appearances for the club, Barracas Central announced that Quejada had returned to Colombia.

Having returned to Colombia, Quejada joined Categoría Primera B side Llaneros, and scored his first goal for the club on 5 August 2023, Llaneros' second goal in an eventual 4–3 comeback win against Leones.

== Career statistics ==
=== Club ===
As of 1 September 2023.

Appearances and goals by club, season and competition
Club	Season	League			Cup		Other		Total	
Club	Season	Division	Apps	Goals	Apps	Goals	Apps	Goals	Apps	Goals
Grêmio	2022	Série B	1	0	0	0	1 (Note: Appearances in the Recopa Gaúcha)	0	2	0
Grêmio	2023	Série A	0	0	0	0	0	0	0	0
Grêmio	Total		1	0	0	0	1	0	2	0
São José (loan)	2022	Série C	0	0	0	0	9 (Note: Appearances in the Campeonato Gaúcho)	1	9	1
Barracas Central (loan)	2023	Argentine Primera División	3	0	0	0	0	0	3	0
Llaneros	2023	Categoría Primera B	5	2	0	0	0	0	5	2
Career total			18	3	0	0	1	0	19	3
