= Prosper Donkor =

Ghanaian footballer

Personal information
- Full name: Prosper Kuka Donkor
- Date of birth: June 16, 1994 (age 32)
- Place of birth: Accra, Ghana
- Height: 1.78 m (5 ft 10 in)
- Position: Attacking midfielder

Team information
- Current team: Bourj

Youth career
- 2014–2015: Heart of Lions

Senior career*
Years	Team	Apps	(Gls)
2015–2016	Bechem United	9	(4)
2016–2017	Dreams	13	(5)
2017–2018	Accra Youngwise	7	(3)
2018–2019	Rayon Sports	14	(7)
2023–	Bourj	0	(0)
- * Club domestic league appearances and goals

Prosper Kuka Donkor (born 16 June 1994) is a Ghanaian footballer who plays as an attacking midfielder for Lebanese Second Division club Bourj.

== Career ==
On 3 July 2015, Donkor joined Ghanaian giants Dreams on a two-year contract.

On 8 August 2018, Donkor signed at Rwanda National Football League club Rayon Sports F.C.

On 3 August 2023, Donkor joined Lebanese Premier League club Bourj.

== Honours ==
Rayon Sports

- Rwanda Premier League: 2018–19
