= Kfarjoz Municipal Stadium =

Football stadium in Lebanon

- ملعب كفرجوز البلدي
- Interactive map of Kfarjoz Municipal Stadium
- Location: Kfar Jouz, Nabatieh, Lebanon
- Coordinates: 33°23′51.8″N 35°28′15.1″E
- Owner: Lebanese Government
- Operator: Lebanese Government
- Capacity: 2,000
- Surface: Artificial turf
- Field size: 110 x 70 metres

Construction
- Expanded: 2014

Tenant
- Chabab Ghazieh SC - Ahly Nabatieh

Kfarjoz Municipal Stadium (Arabic: ملعب كفرجوز البلدي) is a football field located in the Kfar Jouz district of Nabatieh, Lebanon. The stadium can accommodate 2,000 spectators.
