= Jwaya =

Jwaya جويا
- Municipality
- Location within Lebanon
- Coordinates: 33°14′N 35°20′E
- Grid position: 181/293 PAL
- Country: Lebanon
- Governorate: South Governorate
- District: Tyre
- Elevation: 300 m (980 ft)
- Time zone: +2
  - Summer (DST): +3

Jwaya (Arabic: جويا, romanized: Jwayā), or Jouaiya, is a municipality in Tyre District, South Governorate, Lebanon. It is located in the center of Jabal Amil, 95 kilometres (59 mi) from the capital Beirut, 54 kilometres (34 mi) from Sidon, and 16 kilometres (9.9 mi) from Tyre. Its elevation is 298 metres (978 ft) above sea level.

== History ==
In 1596, it was named as a village, Juba, in the Ottoman nahiyah (subdistrict) of Tibnin under the liwa (district) of Safad, with a population of 87 households and 38 bachelors, all Muslim. The villagers paid a fixed tax rate of 25% on agricultural products, such as wheat, barley, fruit trees, goats and beehives, in addition to occasional revenues; a total of 11,859 akçe.

Several lintels have been found here. In 1881, the PEF's Survey of Western Palestine (SWP) described it as "a large village, built of stone and of good materials, containing about 1,000 Metawileh. They weave and dye cloth, and have a small market. It is situated on a hill, and is surrounded with olives, figs, and arable land. The water supply is from two springs and many cisterns."

In mid-August 1986, three French soldiers – all members of UNIFIL – were killed by a remote-controlled bomb while jogging through Jwaya. The incident followed the killing of two Amal officials at a French checkpoint. At the time there were 605 French soldiers and 786 logistics staff serving with UNIFIL.

After Operation Accountability, in July 1993, some units of the Lebanese Armed Forces were deployed closer to the Lebanese border with Israel. A small base was established in Jwaya. It was the most southerly point of their deployment.

== Demographics ==
In 2014, Muslims made up 99.18% of registered voters in Jwaya. 97.00% of the voters were Shia Muslims.

== Educational establishments ==
The table below provides a comparison of public and private schools locally and nationally. It can be used to assess the distribution of students between public and private institutions both locally and nationally. All data provided on education concerning the 2005–2006 school year.

Educational establishments	Jwaya (2005–2006)	Lebanon (2005–2006)
Schools	6	2,788
Public schools	4	1,763
Private schools	2	1,025
Students in public schools	1,160	439,905
Students in private schools	530	471,409

== Media ==
- Ahl Jwaya Group: www.ahljwaya.com
- Jwaya First: www.jwayafirst.com

== Notable people ==
- Ali Tneich (born 1992), Lebanese footballer

== Bibliography ==
- Conder, C.R.; Kitchener, H.H. (1881). The Survey of Western Palestine: Memoirs of the Topography, Orography, Hydrography, and Archaeology. Vol. 1. London: Committee of the Palestine Exploration Fund.
- Hütteroth, W.-D.; Abdulfattah, K. (1977). Historical Geography of Palestine, Transjordan and Southern Syria in the Late 16th Century. Erlanger Geographische Arbeiten, Sonderband 5. Erlangen, Germany: Vorstand der Fränkischen Geographischen Gesellschaft. ISBN 3-920405-41-2.
- Palmer, E.H. (1881). The Survey of Western Palestine: Arabic and English Name Lists Collected During the Survey by Lieutenants Conder and Kitchener, R. E. Transliterated and Explained by E.H. Palmer. Committee of the Palestine Exploration Fund.
- Rhode, H. (1979). Administration and Population of the Sancak of Safed in the Sixteenth Century. Columbia University. Archived from the original on 2016-10-10.
