= Lebanese FA Cup =

Annual knockout football competition in Lebanese football

- Organiser(s): Lebanese Football Association
- Founded: 1937; 89 years ago
- Region: Lebanon
- Teams: 16
- Domestic cup: Lebanese Super Cup
- Current champions: Nejmeh (9th title)
- Most championships: Ansar (16 titles)
- Broadcaster: MTV Lebanon
- 2026–27 Lebanese FA Cup

The Lebanon Cup (Arabic: كأس لبنان), commonly known as the Lebanese FA Cup in English, is an annual knockout football competition in domestic Lebanese football.

The first edition of the competition was held in the 1937–38 season, with Nahda defeating Hilmi-Sport 3–2 in the replay of the final after the first match ended in a 1–1 draw. The most successful club in the competition is Ansar, with 16 titles, followed by Nejmeh with nine. Ansar have also contested the most finals, with 21 appearances, followed by Nejmeh with 19.

== Format ==
The Lebanese FA Cup has traditionally been contested as a single-elimination tournament. From the 2020–21 season through the 2025–26 season, the competition consisted of 16 clubs, comprising the 12 Lebanese Premier League clubs and four Second Division clubs.

From the 2026–27 season, the 16 participating clubs are divided into four groups of four. The four groups are headed by the four highest-placed clubs in the 2025–26 Lebanese Premier League. Each group is contested in a single round-robin format, with every club playing three matches. The top two clubs in each group advance to the quarter-finals.

The 16 clubs consist of the 12 clubs participating in the 2026–27 Lebanese Premier League and four Second Division clubs qualifying through a four-team quadrangular tournament. Two of the four Second Division qualifiers were allocated places in Group B and Group D in the 2026–27 draw, with their identities to be determined by the results of the quadrangular tournament.

From the quarter-finals onward, the competition is played as a single-elimination tournament, with each tie decided over one match. In the event of a draw after 90 minutes, 30 minutes of extra time are played. If the score remains level after extra time, the winner is determined by a penalty shoot-out.

Round	Clubs remaining	Clubs involved	Format	Qualification
Group stage	16	16	4 groups of 4, single round-robin	Top two clubs from each group
Quarter-finals	8	8	Single match	Winners advance
Semi-finals	4	4	Single match	Winners advance
Final	2	2	Single match	Winner crowned Lebanese FA Cup champion

== Winners and finalists ==
=== Winners by year ===
Lebanese FA Cup finals
No.	Season	Winners	Score	Runners–up
1st	1937–38	Nahda	1–1	Hilmi-Sport
1st (R)	1937–38	Nahda	3–2	Hilmi-Sport
2nd	1938–39	Hilmi-Sport	2–1	Homenetmen
3rd	1939–40	Hilmi-Sport	3–2	DPHB
4th	1940–41	Nahda	4–2	Homenetmen
5th	1942–43	Homenetmen	3–2	Nahda
6th	1944–45	Nahda	2–2	Racing Beirut
6th (R)	1944–45	Nahda	3–2	Racing Beirut
7th	1946–47	Nahda	2–1	Pagramian
8th	1947–48	Homenetmen	1–0	Racing Beirut
9th	1950–51	Shabiba Mazraa	4–2	Nejmeh
10th	1951–52	Shabiba Mazraa	8–1	Homenetmen
11th	1961–62	Homenetmen	4–2	Shabiba Mazraa
12th	1963–64	Safa	1–0	Nejmeh
13th	1970–71	Nejmeh	3–1	Safa
14th	1985–86	Safa	1–0	Ansar
15th	1986–87	Nejmeh	2–0	Tadamon Beirut
16th	1987–88	Ansar	1–0	Shabab Sahel
17th	1988–89	Nejmeh	4–0	Tadamon Sour
18th	1989–90	Ansar	3–2	Safa
19th	1990–91	Ansar	2–1	Safa
20th	1991–92	Ansar	2–0 (a.e.t.)	Harakat Shabab
21st	1992–93	Bourj	4–1	Homenmen
22nd	1993–94	Ansar	4–1	Homenmen
23rd	1994–95	Ansar	1–0	Safa
24th	1995–96	Ansar	4–2 (a.e.t.)	Nejmeh
25th	1996–97	Nejmeh	2–0	Ansar
26th	1997–98	Nejmeh	2–1	Homenmen
27th	1998–99	Ansar	2–1 (a.e.t.)	Homenmen
28th	1999–2000	Shabab Sahel	1–1 (p)	Safa
29th	2000–01	Tadamon Sour	2–1	Ansar
30th	2001–02	Ansar	2–1	Ahed
31st	2002–03	Olympic Beirut	3–2 (a.e.t.)	Nejmeh
32nd	2003–04	Ahed	2–1 (a.e.t.)	Nejmeh
33rd	2004–05	Ahed	2–1	Olympic Beirut
34th	2005–06	Ansar	3–1	Sagesse
35th	2006–07	Ansar	3–1	Ahed
36th	2007–08	Mabarra	2–1	Safa
37th	2008–09	Ahed	2–0	Shabab Sahel
38th	2009–10	Ansar	2–1 (a.e.t.)	Mabarra
39th	2010–11	Ahed	3–0	Safa
40th	2011–12	Ansar	2–1 (a.e.t.)	Nejmeh
41st	2012–13	Safa	2–1	Shabab Sahel
42nd	2013–14	Salam Zgharta	1–0 (a.e.t.)	Tripoli
43rd	2014–15	Tripoli	2–1	Nejmeh
44th	2015–16	Nejmeh	0–0 (p)	Ahed
45th	2016–17	Ansar	1–0	Safa
46th	2017–18	Ahed	0–0 (p)	Nejmeh
47th	2018–19	Ahed	1–0	Ansar
48th	2020–21	Ansar	1–1 (p)	Nejmeh
49th	2021–22	Nejmeh	2–1	Ansar
50th	2022–23	Nejmeh	0–0 (p)	Ahed
51st	2023–24	Ansar	2–1	Ahed
52nd	2025–26	Nejmeh	2–0	Sagesse

=== Results by team ===
Results by team
Club	Wins	Runners-up	Total final appearances
Ansar	16	5	21
Nejmeh	9	10	19
Ahed	6	4	10
Nahda	4	1	5
Safa	3	8	11
Homenetmen	3	3	6
Hilmi-Sport	2	1	3
Shabiba Mazraa	2	1	3
Shabab Sahel	1	3	4
Mabarra	1	1	2
Olympic Beirut	1	1	2
Tadamon Sour	1	1	2
Tripoli	1	1	2
Bourj	1	0	1
Salam Zgharta	1	0	1
Homenmen	0	4	4
Racing Beirut	0	2	2
Sagesse	0	2	2
DPHB	0	1	1
Harakat Shabab	0	1	1
Pagramian	0	1	1
Tadamon Beirut	0	1	1

== Media coverage ==
MTV Lebanon broadcasts a selection of cup matches.

== See also ==
- Lebanese Federation Cup
- Lebanese Elite Cup
- Lebanese Challenge Cup

== Bibliography ==
- Sakr, Ali Hamidi (1992). مؤسسة نوفل للتوزيع [Lebanese Football Encyclopedia]. ISBN 0000281247.
