= Al Ahed Stadium =

Football stadium in Lebanon

- ملعب نادي العهد الرياضي
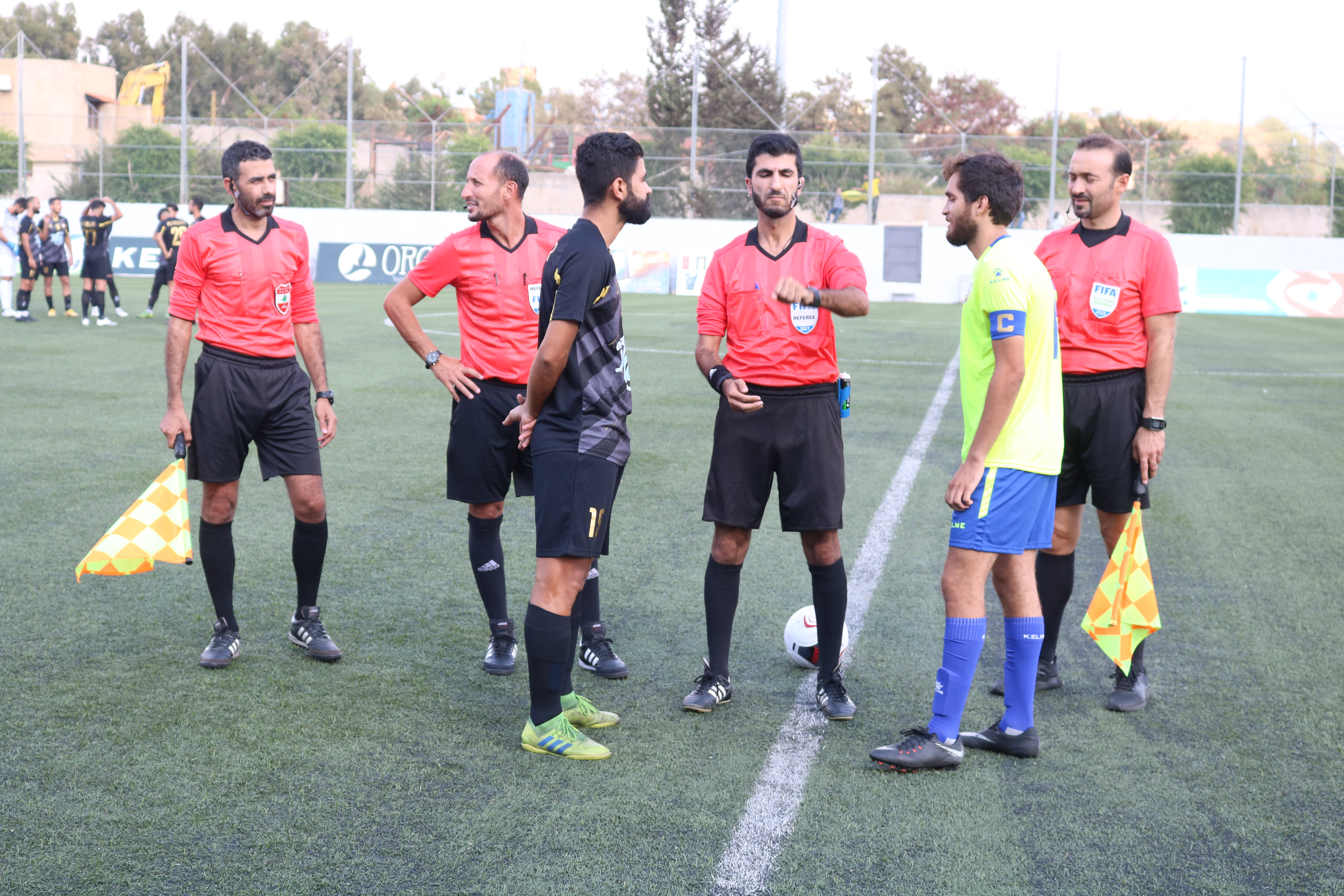
- A 2021–22 Lebanese Premier League match at Al Ahed Stadium
- Interactive map of Al Ahed Stadium
- Location: Bourj el-Barajneh, Lebanon
- Coordinates: 33°50′26″N 35°29′23″E
- Owner: Al Ahed FC
- Operator: Al Ahed FC
- Capacity: 2,000
- Surface: Edel Grass (Artificial turf)

Tenant
- Al Ahed FC

Al Ahed Stadium (Arabic: ملعب نادي العهد الرياضي) is a football field located in the Al-Ouzai area of Bourj el-Barajneh, in the southern suburbs of Beirut, Lebanon. The stadium can accommodate about 2,000 spectators, and is owned by Al Ahed FC, which uses it as a training ground.

In 2018, Israeli prime minister Benjamin Netanyahu accused Hezbollah, a Shia political party and militant group based in Lebanon, in a speech of using the Al Ahed Stadium as a missile cluster. Gebran Bassil, the Lebanese Minister of Foreign Affairs, denied the claims.
