= Al Mabarra Club =

Association football club in Lebanon

Mabarra
- Full name: Al Mabarra Club
- Founded: 1987; 39 years ago
- Ground: Mabarra Field
- Chairman: Ahmad Kassem
- Manager: Hussein Hassoun
- League: Lebanese Premier League
- 2025–26: Lebanese Premier League, 8th of 12
Home colours	Away colours

Al Mabarra Club (Arabic: نادي المبرة الرياضي) is a football club based in Beirut, Lebanon, that competes in the Lebanese Premier League.

Established in 1987, the club has experienced periods of both relegation and promotion throughout its history. They first played in the Lebanese Premier League in 1989, and won one Lebanese FA Cup in 2008.

The club is affiliated with the Al-Mabarrat Charitable Organization, and is known for its social and community-oriented foundation. Mabarra have Shia ties.

== History ==
Mabarra officially launched in 1987, emerging from the Imam Al-Khoei Charity, the first institution established by the Al-Mabarrat Association. Originally created to serve orphans and underprivileged youth cared for by the association, the club aimed to foster both physical and moral development through sports. It joined the Lebanese Football Association in the same year and gradually ascended through the league system, reaching the Lebanese Premier League in the 2002–03 season.

The club quickly became a consistent competitor in Lebanon’s top football competitions. Mabarra’s first major achievement came in 2008 when it won the Lebanese FA Cup, followed by a runner-up finish in 2010. The club also participated in the AFC Cup in 2009, securing notable victories over Erbil (Iraq) and Al-Arabi (Kuwait).

Mabarra was relegated to the Second Division following the 2013–14 season. In the years that followed, the club alternated between attempting to return to the First Division and fighting to avoid relegation to the Third Division.

A turning point came ahead of the 2023–24 season when Ali Haidar became club president and began restructuring the team. During the 2024–25 season, Mabarra secured promotion to the Premier League in June 2025 by defeating Ahly Nabatieh 4–2 in a decisive match.

On 2 September 2026, Mabarra announced the suspension of all football activities and the dissolution of its football teams, citing the difficult economic conditions in Lebanon. The club subsequently reached an agreement with fellow Lebanese club Chabab Ghazieh for the latter to take over Mabarra's position in the Lebanese Premier League. Under the arrangement, Chabab Ghazieh's players were to be registered with Mabarra, while the team would initially compete in the 2026–27 Lebanese Premier League and Lebanese FA Cup under Mabarra's name pending the completion of the administrative procedures required to change its name to Chabab Ghazieh.

== Players ==
=== Current squad ===
As of 7 November 2026

Note: Flags indicate national team as defined under FIFA eligibility rules; some limited exceptions apply. Players may hold more than one non-FIFA nationality.

No.	Pos.	Nation	Player
1	GK	LBN	Hassan Taki
2	MF	LBN	Ahmad Hassoun
4		LBN	Hussein Danach
6	DF	LBN	Jad Chalhoub
7		LBN	Abbas El Amir Ghaddar
8	FW	LBN	Abdallah Halaweh
9	FW	LBN	Ahmad Makki
9		LBN	Mehdi Jouni
11	FW	LBN	Hadi Doueik
12	MF	NGR	Sakin Bolaji
14	MF	LBN	Hussein Jawad Khalife
16	FW	NGR	Usman Abdullahi
17	FW	LBN	Mohammad Serdah
18	DF	NGR	Chigozie Ani
19	MF	LBN	Hussein Bajouk

No.	Pos.	Nation	Player
20	MF	LBN	Hassan Annan
24		LBN	Hussein Hijazi
25	GK	LBN	Hussein Madi
27	DF	LBN	Mohammad Nehme
30	FW	NGR	Chukwudi Nwaodu
33	FW	LBN	Hassan Deeb
64	MF	NGR	Ifeanyichukwu Ejeh
70		LBN	Ihab Hadid
77	FW	FRA	Freud Gnindokponou
99	FW	LBN	Ammar Hariri
—	GK	LBN	Ibrahim El Riz
—	DF	GHA	Desmond Gyabeng
—	DF	LBN	Issa Nehme
—	MF	LBN	Jamil Ibrahim
—		LBN	Ali Ahmad Ghaddar

== Honours ==
- Lebanese FA Cup
  - Winners (1): 2007–08
  - Runners-up (1): 2009–10
- Lebanese Second Division
  - Winners (1): 1987–88, 2012–13 (Group B)
- Lebanese Super Cup
  - Runners-up (1): 2008

== Performance in AFC competitions ==
- AFC Cup: 1 appearance

2009: Group stage

== See also ==
- List of football clubs in Lebanon
