= Tripoli Municipal Stadium =

Stadium in Tripoli, Lebanon

- ملعب طرابلس البلدي
- Rashid Karami Municipal Stadium
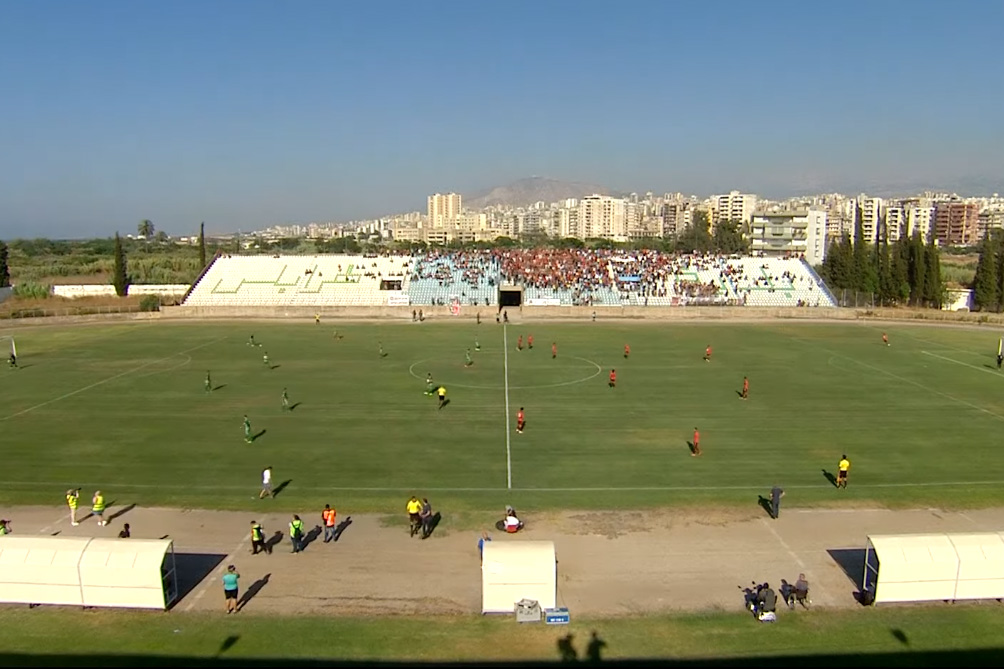
- Tripoli Municipal Stadium in 2019
- Interactive map of Tripoli Municipal Stadium
- Location: Tripoli, Lebanon
- Coordinates: 34°26′41.0″N 35°50′11.5″E
- Owner: Lebanese Government
- Operator: Lebanese Government
- Capacity: 12,000

Construction
- Opened: 29 May 1960; 66 years ago

Tenant
- AC Tripoli

Tripoli Municipal Stadium (Arabic: ملعب طرابلس البلدي), also known as the Rashid Karami Municipal Stadium (Arabic: ملعب رشيد كرامي البلدي), is a 12,000 capacity multi-use stadium in Tripoli, Lebanon. Located near the city center, it is the home ground of AC Tripoli.

== History ==
The public stadium was built by engineer Emil Khlat. It was inaugurated on 29 May 1960. It was rehabilitated to welcome Pan Arabic competitions, as well as Asian and International ones.

The stadium remained operating with natural grass thanks to the efforts and dedication of Ahmad As-Sabbagh Abu Hilmi, former goalkeeper and employee of the Tripoli municipality, setting it apart from other Lebanese stadiums, especially those with natural grass that stopped hosting sporting activities due to lack of maintenance.
