= Safa Stadium =

Stadium in Beirut, Lebanon

Coordinates: 33°52′29″N 35°29′31″E

- ملعب نادي الصفاء الرياضي
- Interactive map of Safa Stadium
- Location: Wata El-Museitbeh, Beirut, Lebanon
- Owner: Safa SC
- Capacity: 4,000

Construction
- Opened: 1948

The Safa Stadium (Arabic: ملعب نادي الصفاء الرياضي) is a multi-use stadium in Beirut, Lebanon. It is currently used mostly for football matches and serves as the home for Safa SC Beirut. The stadium has a capacity of 4,000 people.
