= Nejmeh SC =

Lebanese association football club

Nejmeh
- Full name: Nejmeh Sporting Club
- Nickname: القلعة النبيذية (The Burgundy Castle)
- Short name: Nejmeh
- Founded: 10 March 1945; 81 years ago
- Ground: Rafic Hariri Stadium
- Capacity: 5,000
- Chairman: Saeed Serbeh
- Manager: Vardan Minasyan
- League: Lebanese Premier League
- 2025–26: Lebanese Premier League, 2nd of 12
- Website: nejmehsc.com
Home colours

Nejmeh Sporting Club (Arabic: نادي النجمة الرياضي, lit. 'The Star Sporting Club') is a football club based in Manara, a neighbourhood in Ras Beirut, Beirut, Lebanon, that competes in the Lebanese Premier League.

The club was established in Beirut in 1945, and received its license in 1947. Nejmeh have won nine Lebanese Premier League titles, nine Lebanese FA Cups, 12 Lebanese Elite Cups, and eight Lebanese Super Cups. In Asia, Nejmeh were runners-up in the 2005 AFC Cup, where they lost to Al-Faisaly of Jordan.

Nejmeh is primarily supported by the Sunni Muslim community with a minority of Shiites and Druzes, and shares a historic rivalry with fellow Beirut-based club Ansar, known as the Beirut derby. The club's board is affiliated with the Future Movement political party and the Hariri family.

== History ==
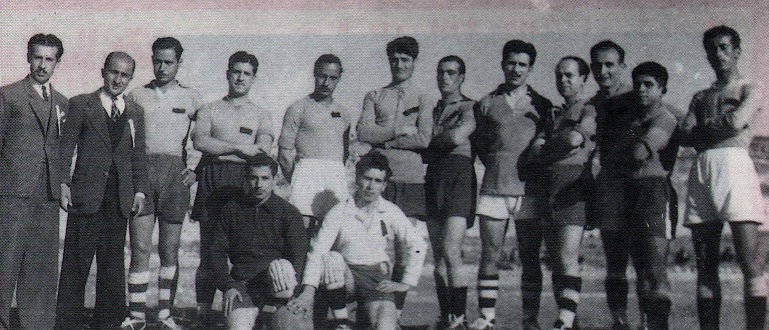
Nejmeh's lineup in 1945

Nejmeh was founded in 1945 by the Druze and Sunni communities from Ras Beirut, Beirut, Lebanon, as an association football club, with Anis Radwan as their first president. This committee applied for a license at the Lebanese Government on 4 March 1947, which was issued on 28 April. The choice of club's name is said to have came on 11 October 1945, when a meeting was held at Radwan's house at night to discuss the affairs of the team. Looking at the sky's stars, Radwan decided to call the team Nejmeh (The Star). The five-pointed star is the Druze's religious symbol.

On 25 July 1950, Nejmeh won the Lebanese Second Division, but were only officially promoted in 1951, during which Papken Poyajian was appointed president of the club. They first competed in the Lebanese Premier League during the 1953–54 season. Nejmeh finished runners-up in the Lebanese FA Cup twice: in 1951 and 1964, losing in the finals to Shabiba Mazraa and Safa respectively.

Nejmeh lifted their first trophy, the Lebanese FA Cup, on 31 October 1971, when they won 3–1 against Safa. Nejmeh's goals were scored by Jamal Al-Khatib, Hassan Chatila, and Mahmoud Chatila. During the 1970s, Brazilian international players Pelé and Bebeto played matches with Nejmeh as honorary guests.

== Colours and badge ==
Ever since the club's foundation, the traditional and primary color of Nejmeh has been burgundy red. The club's badge was composed of a star in the center, in reference to the club's name which, in Arabic, means "Star". The two cedars on the side of the logo recalled Lebanon's national symbol.

In 2019 the logo underwent various changes: the star changed from white to gold, the cedars from green to burgundy and the text from burgundy to black. Other minor changes have also been made such as the enlargement of the width of the white border, and the shift of the text "BEIRUT 1945", which moved from the center of the star to underneath it.

In 2023 the logo was drastically changed, with a more simplistic style being adopted. It became a pictogram of a burgundy "N" (for Nejmeh) and a "C" (for Club) fused together, with a gold star in the center. The text "1945" above and "BEIRUT" below are written in burgundy.

== Stadium ==
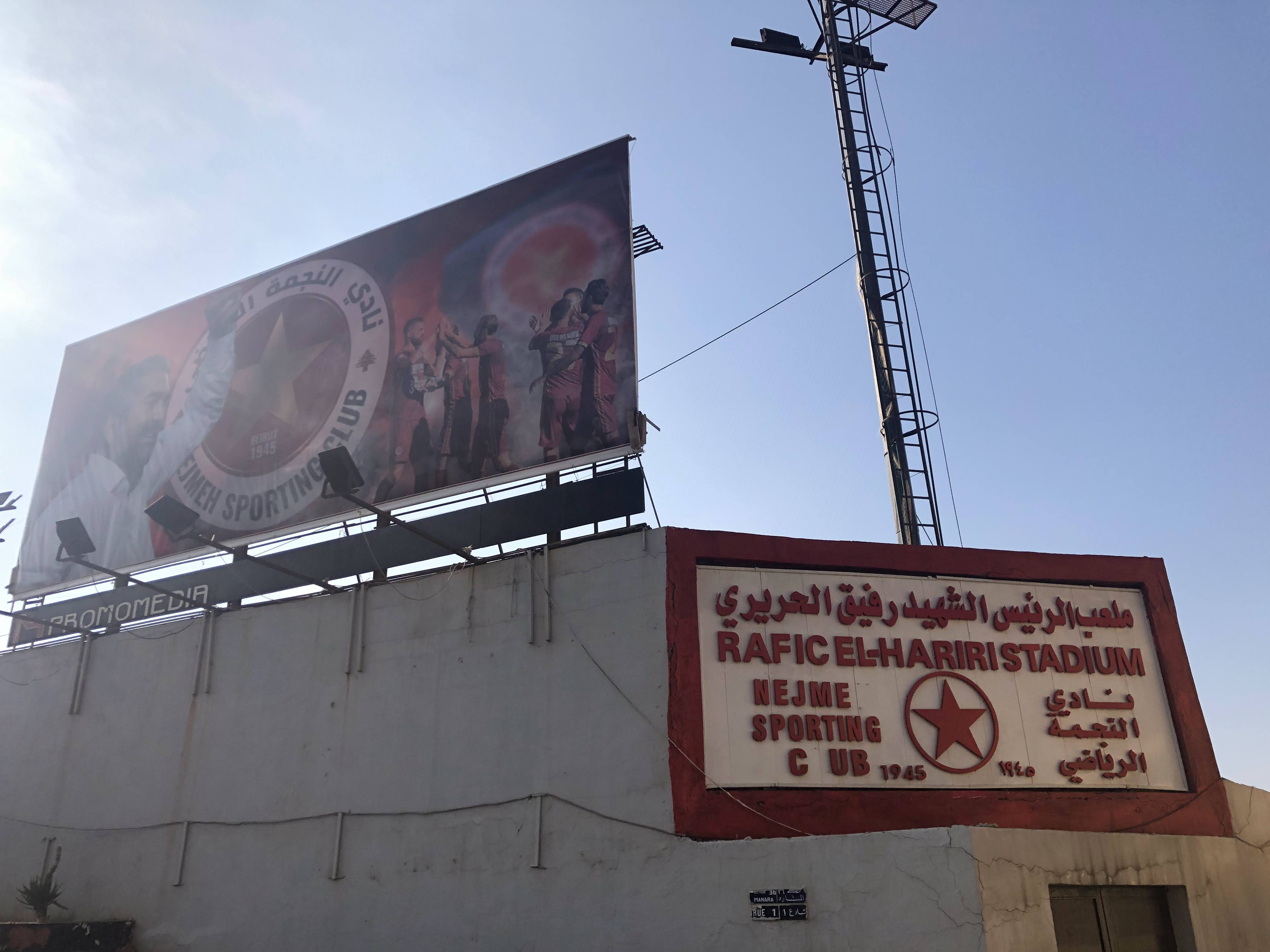
The entrance of the Rafic Hariri Stadium in 2022

The Rafic Hariri Stadium is located in Manara area of Beirut, Lebanon. The stadium consists of a football field, and spaces that accommodate around 5,000 spectators, together with a VIP seats area that accommodates around 100 guests, a cafeteria, and a gymnasium.

The old club stadium first consisted of a sand training field over the land number 704 in Ras Beirut area with no facilities or fences. The stadium went through a rehabilitation process, with improvements including implanting the field with grass, increasing the seats spaces to allow more spectators, and enhancing the stadium facilities, walls, and fences. The first phase of the process started in June 2003 and was completed in late March 2004.

On 21 February 2005, the stadium was named "The Martyr Rafic Hariri Stadium" in honour of the late Prime Minister.

== Supporters ==
Founded on 9 February 2018, Nejmeh's "Ultras Supernova" was the first ultras group to be introduced in Lebanon. The name "Supernova" is a reference to the etymology of Nejmeh which, in Arabic, means "Star".

Prior to the Arab Club Champions Cup game against Al-Ahly of Egypt, played on 13 August 2018, seven "Ultras Supernova" fans were arrested by the Egyptian national security because of the negative connotations the word "Ultras" has in Egypt. The fans were returned to Lebanon by request of the Lebanese Ambassador to Cairo.

During the 2022 FIFA World Cup in Qatar, Nejmeh ultras were employed by the Qatari government to act as Qatar national team fans during their games. The 1,500 "adopted" ultras wore maroon t-shirts with "Qatar" stamped on front, sang the Qatari national anthem and beat drums while singing chants.

== Club rivalries ==
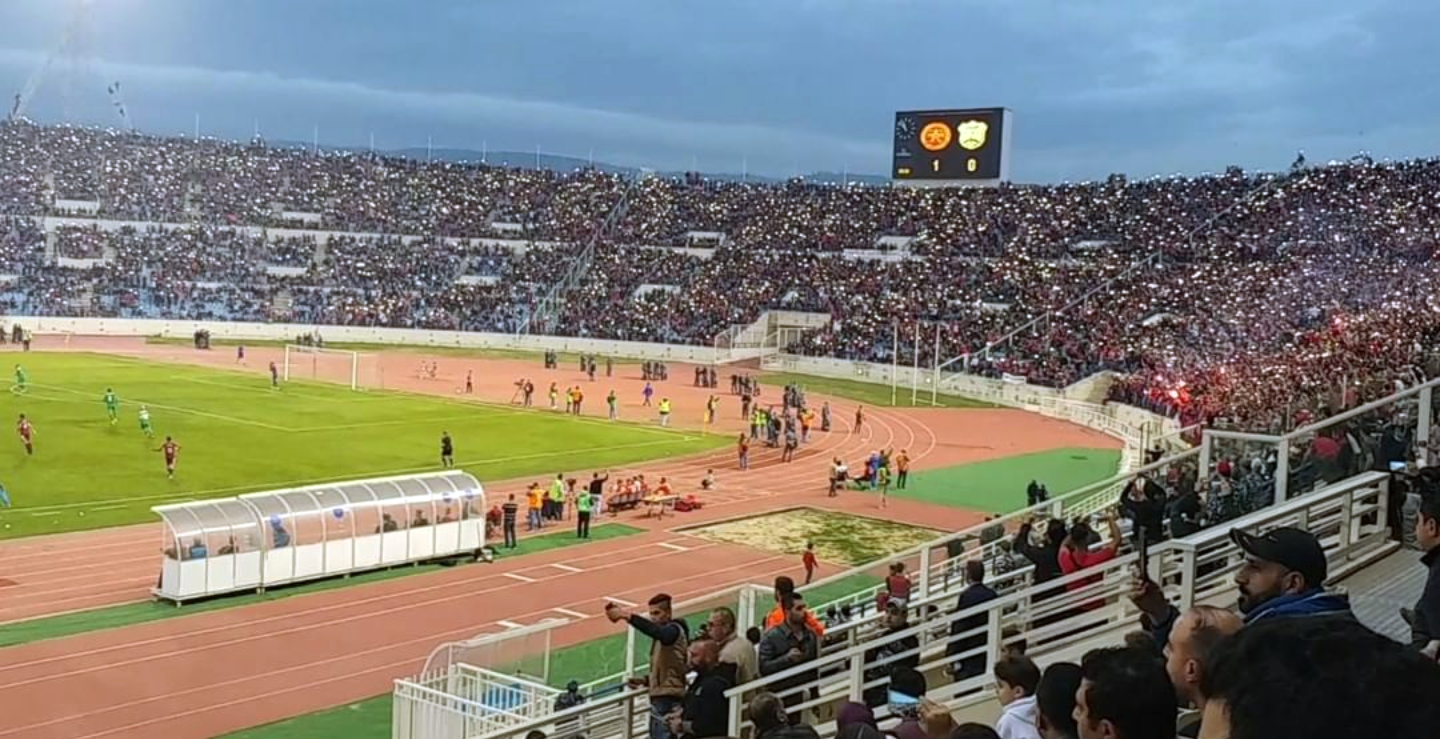
Nejmeh fans during the Beirut derby at the Camille Chamoun Stadium in 2018.

The Beirut derby with Ansar has historically been the most anticipated game in Lebanon: both located in Beirut, Nejmeh and Ansar have shared the majority of titles. While Nejmeh has been more successful in Asia, Ansar holds the most league titles and FA Cups.

In recent years another fierce rivalry has developed, between Nejmeh and Ahed. Also based in Beirut, Ahed have won the majority of league titles since the 2014–15 season. Tensions between the two teams have also forced the federation to change venues multiple times. Most noticeably, in the 2016–17 season, Nejmeh refused to play against Ahed in the league title decider and were sanctioned six points by the federation.

Another rivalry that has developed in recent years is with Salam Zgharta. Since the 2016–17 season, Salam Zgharta and Nejmeh have played various intense games between each other, with some escalating in offensive chants.

Other important matches are with Safa and Racing, both located in the same city as Nejmeh.

== Other teams ==
On 2 September 2025, Nejmeh announced that acquisition of Lebanese Futsal League side Tawfeer Futsal Club, and changed its name to Nejmeh Sporting Club Futsal Team.

On 13 September 2025, Nejmeh established an esports team.

On 22 October 2025, Nejmeh announced the acquisition of Lebanese Women's Football League side ÓBerytus, and changed its name to Nejmeh Sporting Club.

== Kit manufacturers ==
The following is a list of kit manufacturers worn by Nejmeh.

Period	Kit manufacturer
1996–2005	(Germany) Adidas
2006–2012	(Italy) A-Line
2012–2013	(Spain) Joma
2013–2014	(Italy) Lotto
2014–2016	(Germany) Jako
2016–2018	(China) P4
2018–2021	(Switzerland) 14Fourteen
2021–2023	(Germany) Jako
2023–2025	(Spain) Kelme
2025–	(United States) Capelli Sport

== Players ==
=== Current squad ===
As of 8 November 2026

Note: Flags indicate national team as defined under FIFA eligibility rules; some limited exceptions apply. Players may hold more than one non-FIFA nationality.

No.	Pos.	Nation	Player
1	GK	LBN	Hassan Haidar
2	DF	LBN	Ali Alrida Ismail
3	DF	LBN	Mohammad El Hayek
4	DF	LBN	Abbas Sherkawi
5	DF	LBN	Khalil Khamis
6	DF	LBN	Hussein Zein
7	MF	LBN	Ali Al Haj
9	FW	COL	Kevin Quejada
10	MF	LBN	Mohamad Haidar
11	FW	LBN	Ali Kassas
17	MF	SLE	Rodney Michael
18	DF	LBN	Kassem El Zein (captain)
19	MF	LBN	Hassan Jaafar
20	MF	LBN	Hassan Kourani

No.	Pos.	Nation	Player
21	MF	LBN	Ali El Fadl
26	MF	LBN	Oscar Ghantous
28	DF	TUN	Aziz Knani
31	DF	GAM	Lamin Jarjou
36	MF	GHA	Salifu Moro
49	FW	NGR	Ibrahim Gbadamosi
70	FW	SEN	Adama Sene
71	MF	LBN	Hussein Siblini
90	GK	LBN	Ali Hallal
95	GK	LBN	Mostafa Matar
—	GK	LBN	Jason Finianos
—	DF	LBN	Wadih Boiridy
—	DF	NGR	Adamu Ibrahim
—	MF	BFA	Bassirou Compaoré

=== Notable players ===
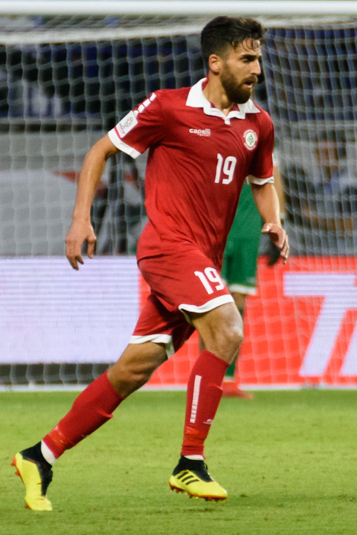
Nejmeh's captain Ali Hamam with Lebanon at the 2019 AFC Asian Cup

Players in international competitions
Competition	Player	National team
2000 AFC Asian Cup	Abbas Chahrour	Lebanon
2000 AFC Asian Cup	Wahid El Fattal	Lebanon
2000 AFC Asian Cup	Mohamed Halawi	Lebanon
2000 AFC Asian Cup	Moussa Hojeij	Lebanon
2007 AFC Asian Cup	Bassim Abbas	Iraq
2012 Africa Cup of Nations	Osama Chtiba	Libya
2017 Africa Cup of Nations	Hassan Wasswa	Uganda
2019 AFC Asian Cup	Kassem El Zein	Lebanon
2019 AFC Asian Cup	Ali Hamam	Lebanon
2019 AFC Asian Cup	Hassan Maatouk	Lebanon
2019 AFC Asian Cup	Nader Matar	Lebanon
2023 AFC Asian Cup	Ali Sabeh	Lebanon
2023 AFC Asian Cup	Maher Sabra	Lebanon
2023 AFC Asian Cup	Kassem El Zein	Lebanon

== Coaching staff ==
Position	Staff
Sporting director	(Lebanon) Bassem Mohamad
Team manager	(Lebanon) Aqil Wizani
Head coach	(Tunisia) Lassaad Dridi
Assistant head coach	(Tunisia) Walid Ben Thabet
Assistant coach	(Lebanon) Mahmoud Farhat
Fitness coach	(Tunisia) Socrate Yerkati
Head of goalkeeping	(Syria) Omar Akil
Performance analyst	(Lebanon) Mohamad Haidar
Physio therapist	(Lebanon) Mohamad Abboud
Physio assistant	(Lebanon) Omar Bakri
Equipment manager	(Lebanon) Mohamad Choukeir
Equipment staff	(Lebanon) Mohamad Loubani
Photographer	(Lebanon) Mostafa Taki
Youth director	(Lebanon) Ibrahim Fakih

== Honours ==
=== Domestic ===
==== League ====
- Lebanese Premier League
  - Winners (9): 1972–73, 1974–75, 1999–00, 2001–02, 2003–04, 2004–05, 2008–09, 2013–14, 2023–24
- Lebanese Second Division
  - Winners (1): 1950–51

==== Cup ====
- Lebanese FA Cup
  - Winners (9): 1970–71, 1986–87, 1988–89, 1996–97, 1997–98, 2015–16, 2021–22, 2022–23, 2025–26
  - Runners-up (9): 1950–51, 1963–64, 1995–96, 2002–03, 2003–04, 2011–12, 2014–15, 2017–18, 2020–21
- Lebanese Elite Cup (defunct)
  - Winners (12; record): 1996, 1998, 2001, 2002, 2003, 2004, 2005, 2014, 2016, 2017, 2018, 2021
  - Runners-up (2): 1997, 2013
- Lebanese Super Cup
  - Winners (8; joint record): 2000, 2002, 2004, 2009, 2014, 2016, 2023, 2024
  - Runners-up (5): 1996, 1997, 2005, 2018, 2021
- National Solidarity Tournament
  - Runners-up (1): 2026

=== Continental ===
- AFC Cup
  - Runners-up (1): 2005
- Arab Club Champions Cup
  - Runners-up (1): 1981–82

=== Awards ===
- Best Team in Asia
  - Winners (1): March 2000

== Performance in AFC competitions ==
In 1982, Nejmeh reached the Arab Club Champions Cup final but lost to Iraqi club Al-Shorta. In 2005, Nejmeh reached the final of the AFC Cup and lost to Al-Faisaly of Jordan: this was the first time a Lebanese football team had reached the final of any Asian competition.

- AFC Champions League: 2 appearances

1996–97: Second round
2002–03: First round

- AFC Cup: 11 appearances

2004: Quarter-finals
2005: Final
2006: Semi-finals
2007: Semi-finals
2010: Group stage
2014: Round of 16
2015: Group stage
2017: Group stage
2019: Group stage
2022: Group stage
2023–24: Group stage

- AFC Challenge League: 1 appearance

2024–25: Group stage

- Asian Cup Winners' Cup: 3 appearances

1990–91: First round
1997–98: First round
1998–99: First round

== See also ==
- List of football clubs in Lebanon
