= Safa SC =

Lebanese association football club

Safa
- Full name: Safa Sporting Club
- Nickname: النسور (The Eagles)
- Short name: Safa
- Founded: 31 March 1939; 87 years ago
- Ground: Safa Stadium
- Capacity: 4,000
- Chairman: Riad Atallah
- Manager: Hussein Tahan
- League: Lebanese Premier League
- 2025–26: Lebanese Premier League, 5th of 12
- Website: safasc.com
Home colours	Away colours

Safa Sporting Club (Arabic: نادي الصفاء الرياضي, lit. 'The Purity Sporting Club') is a football club based in Wata El Msaytbeh, a district of Beirut, Lebanon. Competing in the Lebanese Premier League, the club was founded in 1939 and have since won three league titles, three domestic cups, one Super Cup, and two Elite Cups. Safa also finished runners-up in the 2008 AFC Cup.

Safa is primarily supported by the Druze community, and maintains a strong fanbase throughout Mount Lebanon. As Akhaa Ahli Aley is also based in the Mount Lebanon region, specifically in Aley, matches between the two clubs are referred to as the "Mountain derby" due to their shared regional support.

== History ==
=== Early history (1933–1961) ===
Founded in 1933 at an amateur level in the Wata El-Museitbeh of Beirut, Safa Sporting Club was officially established in 1939 by seven people: Maher Wahab, Anis Naaim, Hasib Al-Jerdi, Amin Haidar, Chafik Nader, Toufik Al-Zouhairy and Adib Haidar.

On 23 December 1948, Safa obtained the official membership and license from the government as a private association. In the same year, the club was affiliated to the Lebanese Football Association and was ranked within the Second Division. In 1961, Safa was promoted to the First Division.

=== Recent history (2021–present) ===
On 4 May 2012, after defeating Nejmeh, Safa were crowned Lebanese Premier League champions for the first time in 2011–12. They were crowned league champions for the second consecutive time in 2012–13, after defeating Ahed 3–1 on 19 May 2013. Safa also won the 2012–13 Lebanese FA Cup, following a 2–1 win against Shabab Sahel in the final, achieving a domestic double for the first time.

After finishing the 2021–22 Lebanese Premier League in 11th place, Safa were due to be relegated to the Second Division for the first time. However, following Shabab Bourj's withdrawal from the league, they were relegated in place of Safa. Safa also narrowly avoided relegation the following season, finishing 10th above Salam Zgharta on account of their positive head-to-head record.

== Kit manufacturers ==
The following is a list of kit manufacturers worn by Safa.

Period	Kit manufacturer
1999–2008	Puma
2008–2010	Adidas
2010–2011	Lotto
2011–2015	Joma
2016–2017	Sportika SA
2017–2018	Jako
2018–2024	Joma
2024-	Kelme

== Stadium ==
Safa Stadium
- ملعب نادي الصفاء الرياضي
- Interactive map of Safa Stadium
- Location: Wata El-Museitbeh
- Coordinates: 33°52′29″N 35°29′31″E
- Capacity: 4,000

Construction
- Opened: 1948

The Safa Stadium opened in 1948, and has a capacity of 4,000 spectators. Located in the Wata El-Museitbeh district of Beirut, the stadium is five minutes from the Beirut–Rafic Hariri International Airport. While the stadium is of Safa's property, the club plays in various other stadiums around the country.

== Club rivalries ==
Safa has important rivalries with Ansar and Nejmeh, both being based in Beirut. Safa also plays the Mountain derby with Akhaa Ahli, as Akhaa is based in Aley, a city in Mount Lebanon, and Safa's support comes from the Druze community in Lebanon, who mainly live in Chouf and Aley districts.

== Players ==
=== Current squad ===
As of 7 November 2026

Note: Flags indicate national team as defined under FIFA eligibility rules; some limited exceptions apply. Players may hold more than one non-FIFA nationality.

No.	Pos.	Nation	Player
2	DF	CIV	Kouassi Eugène Djè
3	DF	LBN	Mohamad Al Mahdi Al Moussawi
5	DF	LBN	Houssein Mortada
6	MF	LBN	Kassem Hayek
7	DF	LBN	Mohamad Zein Tahan
8	MF	SEN	Sérigne Moctar Koité
9	FW	LBN	Karim Slim
10	MF	LBN	Abdallah Dwek
11	FW	LBN	Ceasar Abi Shakra
12	DF	LBN	Ibrahim Chami
13	GK	LBN	Adam Ourfali
13	GK	LBN	Mohammad Zahr
14	MF	LBN	Mohamad Ghamlouch
17	FW	LBN	Mohammad Fakih

No.	Pos.	Nation	Player
18	DF	LBN	Ali Fahs
19	FW	SEN	Tidiane Camara
20	DF	LBN	Abbas Assi
24	DF	LBN	Maher Sabra
26	MF	LBN	Hussein Dbouk
29	FW	SEN	Adama Diaw
33	DF	LBN	Andrew Sawaya
77	MF	LBN	Hamza Tarhini
80	FW	NGR	Eugene Osaghae
88	FW	LBN	Mohamad Kdouh
99	GK	LBN	Antoine Al Douaihy
—	GK	LBN	Shadi Al Halabi
—	DF	LBN	Charbel Assaf
—	DF	LBN	Adam Kdouh

=== Players on loan ===
Note: Flags indicate national team as defined under FIFA eligibility rules; some limited exceptions apply. Players may hold more than one non-FIFA nationality.

No.	Pos.	Nation	Player
—	MF	LBN	Ali Markabawi (at Racing until 30 June 2026)
—	DF	LBN	Saad Chweiki (at Racing until 30 June 2026)
—	MF	LBN	Abdulrazzak Dakramanji (at Tripoli SC until 30 June 2026)

=== Notable players ===
Players in international competitions
Competition	Player	National team
1996 AFC Asian Cup	Yasser Sibai	Syria
2000 AFC Asian Cup	Youssef Mohamad	Lebanon
2000 AFC Asian Cup	Ahmad Naamani	Lebanon
2019 AFC Asian Cup	Ahmad Taktouk	Lebanon
2019 AFC Asian Cup	Mohamed Zein Tahan	Lebanon
2023 AFC Asian Cup	Hassan Chaitou	Lebanon

== Honours ==
=== Domestic ===
- Lebanese Premier League
  - Winners (3): 2011–12, 2012–13, 2015–16
- Lebanese FA Cup
  - Winners (3): 1964–65, 1986–87, 2012–13
  - Runners-up (8): 1970–71, 1989–90, 1990–91, 1994–95, 1999–2000, 2007–08, 2010–11, 2016–17
- Lebanese Elite Cup (defunct)
  - Winners (2): 2009, 2012
  - Runners-up (3): 2011, 2014, 2015
- Lebanese Super Cup
  - Winners (1): 2013
  - Runners-up (3): 2011, 2012, 2016
- Lebanese Second Division
  - Winners (1): 1960–61 (Beirut)

=== Continental ===
- AFC Cup
  - Runners-up (1): 2008

=== Other achievements ===
- Lebanese Challenge Cup (defunct)
  - Runners-up (1): 2022

== Performance in AFC competitions ==
- AFC Cup: 5 appearances

2008: Final
2009: Round of 16
2012: Group stage
2013: Group stage
2014: Round of 16

- AFC Challenge League: 1 appearance

2025–26: Group stage

- Asian Cup Winners' Cup: 2 appearances

1992–93: Withdrew in first round
2000–01: Withdrew in first round

== Managerial history ==
- (Lebanon) Walid Zeineddine
- (Egypt) Mahmoud Saad
- (Iraq) Akram Salman
- (Lebanon) Ghassan Abou Diab
- (Lebanon) Samir Saad
- (Lebanon) Emile Rustom
- (Romania) Valeriu Tița (2013–2014)
- (Lebanon) Emile Rustom (2015–2018)
- (Romania) Valeriu Tița (2018–2019)
- (Tunisia) Tarek Jarraya (2019)
- (Germany) Robert Jaspert (2019–2020)
- (Lebanon) Emile Rustom (2020)
- (Lebanon) Mohammad Dakka (2020–2021)
- (Lebanon) Fadi Oumari (2021–22)
- (Lebanon) Malek Hassoun (2022)
- (Lebanon) Youssef Jawhari (2022–2023)
- (Lebanon) Moussa Hojeij (2023)
- (Netherlands) Johnny Jansen (2023)
- (Netherlands) Jan de Jonge (2023)
- (Lebanon) Bassem Marmar (2023–2025)
- (Lebanon) Hussein Tahan (2025-)

== See also ==
- Safa WFC, defunct women's team
- List of football clubs in Lebanon
