= Bassem Marmar =

Lebanese footballer and coach (born 1977)

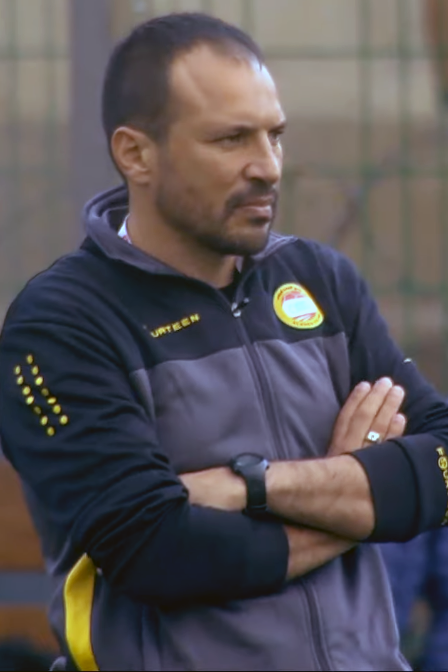
- Marmar as head coach of Ahed in 2019

Personal information
- Full name: Bassem Ali Marmar
- Date of birth: 28 March 1977 (age 49)
- Place of birth: Khobar, Saudi Arabia
- Height: 1.80 m (5 ft 11 in)
- Positions: Midfielder; defender

Team information
- Current team: Lebanon U23 (head coach)

Youth career
- 1993-1996: Ahed

Senior career*
Years	Team	Apps	(Gls)
1996–2010	Ahed	220	(29)
Total		220	(29)

Managerial career
- 2010–2016: Ahed Youth
- 2016–2017: Ahed
- 2017–2020: Ahed
- 2020: Al-Arabi
- 2021–2023: Ahed
- 2023–2025: Safa
- 2025–2026: Ahed
- 2026–: Lebanon U23
- * Club domestic league appearances and goals

Bassem Ali Marmar (Arabic: باسم علي مرمر; born 28 March 1977) is a Lebanese football coach and former player who is the head coach of the Lebanon national under-23 team.

Starting his playing career at Ahed in 1996, Marmar helped Ahed win multiple titles, most notably the 2003–04 Lebanese FA Cup, Ahed's first major trophy, and the 2007–08 Lebanese Premier League, Ahed's first league title. He was the club's captain from 2007 to his retirement in 2010.

In 2016 Marmar was appointed head coach of Ahed, helping them win numerous domestic titles, as well as the 2019 AFC Cup, the first AFC Cup title for a Lebanese side. In 2020 Marmar took charge of Kuwaiti side Al-Arabi, becoming the first Lebanese coach to manage abroad. He returned to Ahed in 2021, and became head coach of Safa in 2023. In 2025 he returned to Ahed for a fourth stint, and in 2026 he was appointed head coach of the Lebanon national under-23 team.

== Playing career ==
Marmar began his senior career with Lebanese Second Division side Ahed on 20 June 1996. He helped his side gain promotion to the Lebanese Premier League in 1998. In 2003–04 Marmar helped Ahed lift their first major trophy: the Lebanese FA Cup. Marmar stated that, at the time, he refused the captain's armband; in 2007, however, the club's management decided for Marmar to become the club's captain. As captain, in 2007–08 Marmar helped Ahed win their first ever Lebanese Premier League.

In 2010, Marmar retired as a footballer; despite his multiple injuries throughout his career, Marmar won two league titles (2007–08 and 2009–10), three Lebanese FA Cups (2003–04, 2004–05, and 2008–09), two Lebanese Elite Cups (2008 and 2010), a Lebanese Federation Cup (2004), and two Lebanese Super Cups (2008 and 2010).

== Managerial career ==
=== Ahed ===
In 2007 Marmar was appointed assistant manager of Ahed, which was coached by German manager Robert Jaspert. Describing his time as Jaspert's assistant, Marmar stated that he "felt like a partner", which was "what made [him] want to become a coach". Following his retirement as a player in 2010, Marmar went to Germany to get coaching courses. Upon his return to Lebanon, he was appointed technical director of Ahed's academy and youth sector. He won the under-15 league in 2012, the under-17 league in 2013 and 2014, and the under-17 league in 2015 and 2016.

In 2014 and 2015, Marmar was Ahed's caretaker manager; he became Ahed's first team manager in 2016 following the departure of Robert Jaspert. In his first season as coach, Marmar won the 2016–17 Lebanese Premier League. Marmar was nominated 2016–17 Lebanese Premier League Coach of the Season. After winning the league, Marmar went back to coaching Ahed's youth side, citing difficulties with the players as the main reason.

Three matchdays into the 2017–18 season, Marmar was re-appointed as head coach of Ahed. Marmar stated: "At that moment, there was a shift of mentality in the club. The players were starting to get accountable for their actions. The issues I faced when I was there started to vanish, so I took back the job." That season, Marmar helped Ahed win the domestic double, lifting both the league and FA Cup titles. He was awarded Lebanese Coach of the Season for the second consecutive time.

In 2018–19, Marmar helped Ahed win a second successive domestic double, lifting the league, FA Cup, and Super Cup. He went unbeaten for 46 games in a span of over two years. In 2019 Ahed beat North Korean club 25 April 1–0 in the 2019 AFC Cup Final: they became the first Lebanese football club to accomplish the feat. Ahed only conceded three goals in 11 games, going unbeaten throughout the whole tournament. For the third consecutive time, Marmar was named Lebanese Coach of the Season.

=== Al-Arabi ===
On 25 July 2020, after being involved with Ahed for 24 years as a player and as a manager, Marmar was hired as head coach of Kuwait Premier League club Al-Arabi. He became the first Lebanese manager to coach outside of Lebanon at professional level. Marmar reunited with former Ahed players Ahmad Al Saleh and Issah Yakubu. In Marmar's first game he helped Al-Arabi win 4–1 against Burgan on 10 September, in the quarter-finals of the 2019–20 Kuwait Crown Prince Cup. Marmar won the competition, after beating Kuwait SC 2–1 in the final on 21 September. After one draw and one defeat in his first two league games, Marmar was dismissed on 26 October.

=== Return to Ahed ===
On 19 January 2021, ahead of the second leg of the 2020–21 season, Ahed announced that Marmar had returned as head coach. Upon his return, Marmar helped Ahed lift the league title and the 2022 Lebanese Elite Cup. Ahed announced Marmar's resignation on 9 January 2023. As Ahed's manager Marmar had won four league titles, two FA Cups, two Super Cups and one Elite Cup, as well as the 2019 AFC Cup.

=== Safa ===
On 13 September 2023, Safa announced the appointment of Marmar as their new head coach, replacing Jan de Jonge who left for personal reasons.

=== Ahed ===
On 10 December 2025, Ahed announced the appointment of Marmar as their new head coach for a fourth stint, replacing Jamal Al Haj. On 31 May 2026, Marmar's contract with Ahed ended.

=== Lebanon U23 ===
On 30 July 2026, the Lebanese Football Association (LFA) announced the appointment or Marmar as the new head coach of the Lebanon national under-23 team.

== Personal life ==
Marmar was born on 28 March 1977 in Khobar, Saudi Arabia, to Lebanese parents; his family is originally from Tayibe, Lebanon. Marmar is fluent in both Arabic and English.

== Honours ==
=== Player ===
Ahed

- Lebanese Premier League: 2007–08, 2009–10
- Lebanese FA Cup: 2003–04, 2004–05, 2008–09
- Lebanese Elite Cup: 2008, 2010
- Lebanese Federation Cup: 2004
- Lebanese Super Cup: 2008, 2010

=== Manager ===
Ahed

- AFC Cup: 2019
- Lebanese Premier League: 2016–17, 2017–18, 2018–19, 2021–22, 2022-23
- Lebanese FA Cup: 2017–18, 2018–19
- Lebanese Elite Cup: 2022; runner-up: 2021
- Lebanese Super Cup: 2017, 2018, 2019

Al-Arabi

- Kuwait Emir Cup: 2019–20

Individual

- Lebanese Premier League Best Coach: 2016–17, 2017–18, 2018–19
