= Ahmad Zreik =

Lebanese footballer (born 1990)

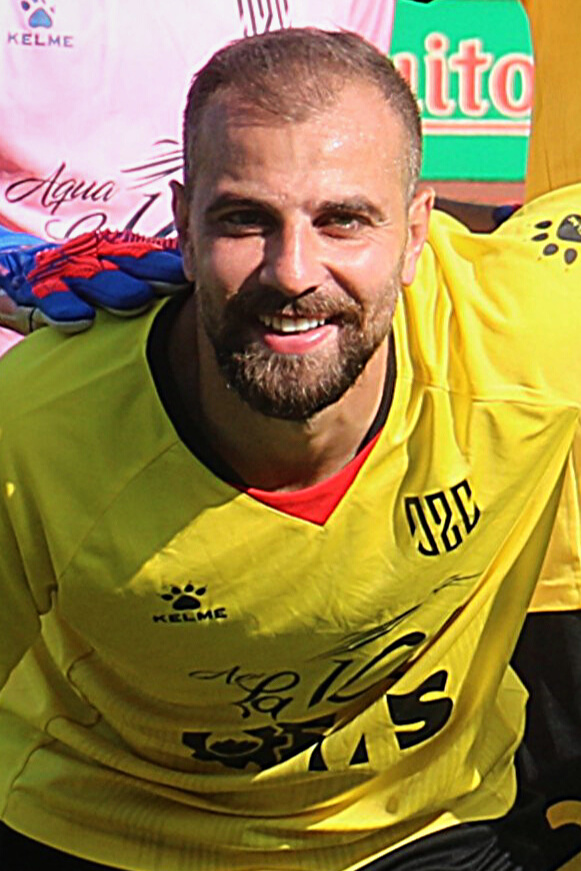
- Zreik with Ahed in 2022

Personal information
- Full name: Ahmad Adib Zreik
- Date of birth: 27 October 1990 (age 36)
- Place of birth: Bint Jbeil, Lebanon
- Height: 1.72 m (5 ft 8 in)
- Position: Winger

Youth career
- 2005–2009: Ahed

Senior career*
Years	Team	Apps	(Gls)
2008–2022	Ahed	131+	(43)
2021	→ Al-Wehdat (loan)	19	(3)
Total		150+	(46)

International career
2007–2008	Lebanon U19		(3)
2009–2013	Lebanon	23	(2)
- * Club domestic league appearances and goals

Ahmad Adib Zreik (Arabic: أحمد أديب زريق; born 27 October 1990) is a Lebanese former professional footballer who played as a winger.

== Club career ==
=== Ahed ===
Coming through the youth system, Zreik began his career at Ahed aged 18 in 2008.

=== Al-Wehdat ===
On 11 February 2021, Zreik joined Jordanian Pro League side Al-Wehdat, on loan until 30 November. He made his debut in the Jordan Shield Cup on 23 February, in a 1–0 win in the group stage against Sahab. Zreik's first assist came on 4 March, in the second game of the Shield Cup group stage against Ma'an, which ended 4–0. On 13 March, Zreik scored his first goal in the final against Al-Jalil, opening the scoring in the first minute; Al-Wehdat eventually lost on penalty shoot-outs after drawing 1–1.

On 4 April, Zreik helped Al-Wehdat win the Jordan Super Cup against Al-Jazeera, scoring a header at the end of the first half in a 2–0 win. Zreik made his AFC Champions League debut on 14 April, drawing 0–0 against Saudi Arabian side Al Nassr; he was named player of the match. On 26 April, Zreik became the first Lebanese player to score in the AFC Champions League, helping Al-Wehdat win their first game in the competition 2–1 against Al Nassr, also making an assist; he was included in the AFC Champions League Team of the Week.

Zreik made his league debut on 9 May, playing the second half of a 2–0 away win against Ma'an. He scored his first league goal on 16 July, helping his team beat Sahab 2–1. On 15 August, Zreik scored in the 2021 Jordan FA Cup round of 32 against Shabab Hwarah, which Al-Wehdat won 4–1. He finished the season with three goals and one assist in 19 league games.

=== Return to Ahed ===
On 12 January 2023, Zreik announced his retirement from football.

== International career ==
Zreik represented Lebanon at the 2008 AFC U-19 Championship, having scored two goals in five appearances during the qualifiers. He scored in Lebanon's 5–1 defeat to Tajikistan.

Zreik made his senior debut for Lebanon in a 2–0 home loss against China in a 2011 AFC Asian Cup qualifying match on 14 November 2009. He was substituted onto the field in the 60th minute for Mahmoud El Ali. He made his last international appearance in 2013.

== Career statistics ==
=== International ===
National team	Year	Apps	Goals
Lebanon	2009	2	0
Lebanon	2010	1	0
Lebanon	2011	3	0
Lebanon	2012	14	2
Lebanon	2013	3	0
Total		23	2

Scores and results list Lebanon's goal tally first, score column indicates score after each Zreik goal.

List of international goals scored by Ahmad Zreik
No.	Date	Venue	Opponent	Score	Result	Competition
1	22 January 2012	Saida Municipal Stadium, Sidon, Lebanon	Iraq	1–0	1–0	Friendly
2	11 May 2012	Tripoli Municipal Stadium, Tripoli, Lebanon	Egypt	1–2	1–4	Friendly

== Honours ==
Ahed

- AFC Cup: 2019
- Lebanese Premier League: 2009–10, 2010–11, 2014–15, 2016–17, 2017–18, 2018–19, 2021–22, 2022–23
- Lebanese FA Cup: 2008–09, 2010–11, 2017–18, 2018–19
- Lebanese Elite Cup: 2008, 2010, 2011, 2013, 2015, 2022
- Lebanese Super Cup: 2008, 2010, 2011, 2015, 2017, 2018, 2019

Al-Wehdat

- Jordan Super Cup: 2021
- Jordan Shield Cup runner-up: 2021

Individual

- Lebanese Premier League Best Player: 2016–17
- Lebanese Premier League Team of the Season: 2008–09, 2011–12, 2015–16, 2016–17, 2017–18
- Lebanese Premier League top assist provider: 2008–09
