= 2019 AFC Cup final =

- Event: 2019 AFC Cup
| April 25 | Al-Ahed |
| (North Korea) | (Lebanon) |
| 0 | 1 |
- Date: 4 November 2019
- Venue: Kuala Lumpur Stadium, Kuala Lumpur
- Man of the Match: Issah Yakubu (Al-Ahed)
- Referee: Hettikamkanamge Perera (Sri Lanka)
- Attendance: 500
- Weather: Mostly clear 27 °C (81 °F)

The 2019 AFC Cup final was the final match of the 2019 AFC Cup, the 16th edition of the AFC Cup, Asia's secondary club football tournament organized by the Asian Football Confederation (AFC).

The final was contested as a single match between April 25 from North Korea and Al-Ahed from Lebanon. The match was played at the Kuala Lumpur Stadium in Kuala Lumpur on 4 November 2019.

Al-Ahed won 1–0 by a goal from Ghanaian player Issah Yakubu. This was Al-Ahed's first continental title, as well as the first for a Lebanese team. April 25 became the first North Korean men's football club to qualify for an Asian final, while Al-Ahed were the third Lebanese side to do so (after Nejmeh in 2005 and Safa in 2008).

== Teams ==
| Team | Zone | Previous finals appearances (bold indicates winners) |
|---|---|---|
| (North Korea) April 25 | East Asia Zone (EAFF) (Inter-zone play-off winner) | None |
| (Lebanon) Al-Ahed | West Asia Zone (WAFF) | None |

== Venue ==
The match was originally to be hosted by April 25 at the Kim Il-sung Stadium in Pyongyang, North Korea on 2 November 2019. However, on 22 October 2019, due to North Korea's decision to ban television transmission of football games, the AFC announced that the final would be held in Shanghai, China in order for the match to be transmitted. On 25 October 2019, the match was rescheduled from 2 November to 4 November and the host city was shifted from Shanghai to Kuala Lumpur, Malaysia.

== Road to the final ==
Note: In all results below, the score of the finalist is given first (H: home; A: away).

| (North Korea) April 25 | | | | Round | (Lebanon) Al-Ahed | | | |
|---|---|---|---|---|---|---|---|---|
| Opponent | Result | | | Group stage | Opponent | Result | | |
| (Chinese Taipei) Hang Yuen | 3–0 (A) | | | Matchday 1 | (Kuwait) Al-Qadsia | 0–0 (H) | | |
| (Hong Kong) Kitchee | 2–0 (H) | | | Matchday 2 | (Bahrain) Malkiya | 0–0 (A) | | |
| (Hong Kong) Tai Po | 3–1 (A) | | | Matchday 3 | (Oman) Al-Suwaiq | 4–2 (H) | | |
| (Hong Kong) Tai Po | 4–0 (H) | | | Matchday 4 | (Oman) Al-Suwaiq | 1–0 (A) | | |
| (Chinese Taipei) Hang Yuen | 5–0 (H) | | | Matchday 5 | (Kuwait) Al-Qadsia | 1–0 (A) | | |
| (Hong Kong) Kitchee | 0–1 (A) | | | Matchday 6 | (Bahrain) Malkiya | 2–1 (H) | | |
| **Group I winners**: Pos / Team / Pld / Pts; **1** / (North Korea) April 25 / **6** / **15**; 2 / (Hong Kong) Kitchee / 6 / **10**; 3 / (Hong Kong) Tai Po / 6 / **8**; 4 / (Chinese Taipei) Hang Yuen / 6 / **1**; Source: AFC | | | | Final standings | **Group C winners**: Pos / Team / Pld / Pts; **1** / (Lebanon) Al-Ahed / **6** / **14**; 2 / (Bahrain) Malkiya / 6 / **8**; 3 / (Kuwait) Al-Qadsia / 6 / **7**; 4 / (Oman) Al-Suwaiq / 6 / **4**; Source: AFC | | | |
| Opponent | Agg. | 1st leg | 2nd leg | Knockout stage | Opponent | Agg. | 1st leg | 2nd leg |
| — | | | | Zonal semi-finals | (Jordan) Al-Wehdat | 1–0 | 1–0 (A) | 0–0 (H) |
| — | | | | Zonal finals | (Jordan) Al-Jazeera | 1–0 | 0–0 (A) | 1–0 (H) |
| (Bangladesh) Abahani Limited Dhaka | 5–4 | 3–4 (A) | 2–0 (H) | Inter-zone play-off semi-finals | — | | | |
| (Vietnam) Hà Nội | 2–2 (a) | 2–2 (A) | 0–0 (H) | Inter-zone play-off final | — | | | |

== Format ==
The final was played as a single match, with the host team (winners of the Inter-zone play-off final) alternated from the previous season's final.

Should it tied after regulation time, extra time and, if necessary, penalty shoot-out would have been used to decide the winning team.

== Match ==
=== Details ===
4 November 2019
21:00 UTC+8

| April 25 (North Korea) | 0–1 | (Lebanon) Al-Ahed |
|---|---|---|
| | Live Report; Stats Report | Yakubu 74' |

Kuala Lumpur Stadium, Kuala Lumpur
Attendance: 500
Referee: Hettikamkanamge Perera (Sri Lanka)

| **April 25** | **Al-Ahed** |

| GK | 23 | (North Korea) An Tae-song | (red card) 26' |
| RB | 6 | (North Korea) Kwon Chung-hyok |
| CB | 30 | (North Korea) An Song-il I |
| CB | 5 | (North Korea) Pak Jin-myong |
| LB | 29 | (North Korea) Pak Song-rok |
| RM | 31 | (North Korea) Choe Chol-su | | (substituted off) 28' |
| CM | 15 | (North Korea) Won Song |
| CM | 7 | (North Korea) O Hyok-chol |
| LM | 14 | (North Korea) Son Pyong-il |
| CF | 13 | (North Korea) Rim Chol-min (c) | | (substituted off) 40' |
| CF | 10 | (North Korea) An Il-bom |
Substitutes:
| GK | 1 | (North Korea) Sin Tae-song | | (substituted on) 28' |
| DF | 2 | (North Korea) Jang Kum-nam |
| DF | 17 | (North Korea) An Song-il II | | | (substituted on) 88' |
| MF | 19 | (North Korea) Yun Il-gwang |
| MF | 24 | (North Korea) Choe Jong-hyok |
| FW | 18 | (North Korea) Kim Yu-song | | (substituted on) 40' | (substituted off) 88' |
| FW | 21 | (North Korea) Jang Hyok |
Manager:
(North Korea) O Yun-son

| GK | 1 | (Lebanon) Mehdi Khalil |
| RB | 6 | (Lebanon) Hussein Zein |
| CB | 4 | (Lebanon) Nour Mansour |
| CB | 2 | (Syria) Ahmad Al Saleh |
| LB | 8 | (Lebanon) Hussein Dakik |
| CM | 13 | (Ghana) Issah Yakubu |
| CM | 15 | (Lebanon) Haytham Faour (c) | (yellow card) 82' |
| RW | 20 | (Lebanon) Rabih Ataya | | (substituted off) 80' |
| AM | 10 | (Lebanon) Mohamad Haidar |
| LW | 11 | (Lebanon) Ahmad Zreik |
| CF | 99 | (Tunisia) Ahmed Akaïchi | | (substituted off) 89' |
Substitutes:
| GK | 21 | (Lebanon) Mohamad Hammoud |
| GK | 98 | (Lebanon) Hadi Khalil |
| DF | 5 | (Lebanon) Khalil Khamis |
| MF | 7 | (Lebanon) Hussein Monzer | (yellow card) 90+3' | (substituted on) 89' |
| MF | 14 | (Lebanon) Walid Shour |
| MF | 23 | (Lebanon) Ali Hadid |
| FW | 30 | (Lebanon) Tarek El Ali | | (substituted on) 80' |
Manager:
(Lebanon) Bassem Marmar

Man of the Match:
Issah Yakubu (Al-Ahed)
Assistant referees:
Deniye Gedara Palitha Parakkrama Hemathunga (Sri Lanka)
Wellabada Hewage Don Senjeewa Premalal (Sri Lanka)
Fourth official:
Omar Al-Yaqoubi (Oman)
Fifth official:
Abdullah Al-Jardani (Oman)

**Match rules**

- 90 minutes.
- 30 minutes of extra time if tied.
- Penalty shoot-out if still tied after extra time.
- Seven named substitutes, of which up to three may be used, with a fourth allowed in extra time.

== See also ==
- 2019 AFC Champions League Final
