= Mehdi Khalil =

Association football player (born 1991)

- Khalil with Lebanon in 2024

Personal information
- Full name: Mehdi Salim Khalil
- Date of birth: 19 September 1991 (age 35)
- Place of birth: Bouaké, Ivory Coast
- Height: 1.96 m (6 ft 5 in)
- Position: Goalkeeper

Team information
- Current team: Sagesse
- Number: 1

Youth career
- 2004–2007: Young Sportsmen Club
- 2007–2011: Johansen
- 2010: → Kallon (loan)
- 2011: → Djurgårdens IF (loan)

Senior career*
Years	Team	Apps	(Gls)
2009–2012	Johansen		
2011	→ Köping FF (loan)	7	(0)
2011	→ Djurgårdens IF (loan)	0	(0)
2011–2012	→ Kallon (loan)		
2013–2017	Safa	50	(0)
2017–2026	Ahed	92	(0)
2020	→ Zob Ahan (loan)	8	(0)
2023–2024	→ Al-Faisaly (loan)	1	(0)
2024	→ Safa (loan)	7	(0)
2026–	Sagesse	0	(0)

International career^{‡}
2013–	Lebanon	58	(0)
- * Club domestic league appearances and goals as of 1 August 2026 ‡ National team caps and goals as of 16:56, 16 December 2024 (UTC)

Mehdi Salim Khalil (Arabic: مهدي سليم خليل, Lebanese Arabic pronunciation: [ˈmahdi saˈliːm xaˈliːl, -de]; born 19 September 1991) is a professional footballer who plays as a goalkeeper for Lebanese Premier League club Sagesse. Born in the Ivory Coast, he plays for the Lebanon national team. Khalil is known as "the Mountain" (Arabic: الجبل) because of his height.

Khalil started his senior career in Sierra Leone at Johansen, before moving to Sweden in 2011, first playing at Köping FF before transferring to Djurgården. Following his experience in Sweden, Khalil moved back to his native country, at Kallon, before joining Lebanese club Safa in 2013. After spending four years at the club, Khalil moved to Lebanese Premier League reigning champions Ahed in 2017. He won the 2019 AFC Cup with the side, the first in Lebanese history, as the competition's Most Valuable Player. In 2020, Khalil moved to Iranian side Zob Ahan on a six-month loan, and in 2023 he joined Al-Faisaly in Jordan on a one-year loan. Khalil returned to Safa on a six-month loan in 2024. After nine years at Ahed, he joined Sagesse in 2026.

Khalil was called up to represent Sierra Leone at youth level without featuring. He has represented Lebanon at senior level since 2013. Khalil played at the 2018 and 2022 FIFA World Cup qualification, and was Lebanon's main goalkeeper at the 2019 AFC Asian Cup.

== Early life ==
Born in Bouaké, Ivory Coast to Lebanese parents, Khalil moved to Freetown, Sierra Leone with his family at a young age. He started playing six-a-side football, a popular form of football in Sierra Leone, at age 12 at Young Sportsmen Club (YSC) as a defender. Noticing his physical attributes, namely his height, Khalil's coach advised him to switch position to goalkeeper.

At age 15–16, he was noticed by Isha Johansen – owner of football club Johansen alongside her Norwegian husband Arne Birger Johansen – in a match between YSC and Johansen. His performance in the game prompted Isha to sign Khalil to Johansen's under-17 team.

== Club career ==
=== 2009–2012: Sierra Leone and Sweden ===
Khalil began his senior career in Sierra Leone in 2009 at Johansen. In 2010, he participated with Kallon U19 at the Viareggio Cup – an annual youth tournament held in Italy – where he played two of the three games.

Thanks to Johansen's Scandinavian connections, in March 2011 Khalil joined Swedish Division 3 side Köping FF on a three-month loan. Talking about his first training session at the club, Khalil said that "[it] was fun [...] the guys seem lovely, and many of them are young, just like me". He played seven games for the club. Between April and June 2011, Khalil trained with Allsvenskan clubs AIK and Trelleborg.

On 20 July 2011, Khalil moved to Djurgården, AIK's rivals, on a four-month loan. He had been noticed by the club's manager Magnus Pehrsson the previous year at a friendly tournament in Ghana; Khalil was named best goalkeeper of the tournament. On 1 August 2011, he made his debut for the club's under-21 team in the U21 Allsvenskan against Brage, helping his side win 5–1. On 25 October 2011, Djurgården announced that Khalil's contract would not be renewed.

Following his experience in Sweden, Khalil moved back to Sierra Leone, playing for Kallon during the 2011–12 season.

=== 2013–2017: Safa ===
Through his links with Roda Antar, a Sierra Leonean-born Lebanese footballer, Khalil trained with the Lebanon national team in 2012, which caught the attention of various Lebanese clubs. Khalil moved to Safa in the Lebanese Premier League in early 2013, signing a three-and-a-half-year contract.

Khalil was initially a reserve for Ziad Al Samad in his first season (2012–13). His debut came during the 2013 AFC Cup, playing in a group stage game against Riffa on 2 April 2013; the match ended in a 1–0 win. On 24 April 2013, Khalil was sent off against Regar-TadAZ in the 79th minute, with the opposing team scoring from the subsequent penalty kick. However, Safa still won the encounter 3–2 through a 92nd-minute goal by Mohamad Haidar. In Khalil's first experience in the AFC Cup he played three matches, finishing third in the group.

Khalil's league debut came in the 2013–14 season, on 23 November 2013, in a 5–0 win over Tadamon Sour. He participated in the 2014 AFC Cup, playing two games. Khalil became the club's first-choice goalkeeper from the 2014–15 season, playing 17 league games. In the 2015–16 season, Khalil played 16 league games, helping Safa win their second league title. He was included in the 2015–16 Lebanese Premier League Team of the Season for his performances.

Following the expiration of his contract in mid-2016, Khalil tried out with several Eerste Divisie teams in the Netherlands. He remained with Safa for one more year, playing 16 games in the league during the 2016–17 season. He also made two appearances in the 2017 AFC Cup. In five seasons at the Beirut-based club, Khalil won two league titles (2012–13 and 2015–16), one FA Cup (2013–14), and one Super Cup (2013).

=== Ahed ===
==== 2017–2020: Two domestic trebles and AFC Cup MVP ====
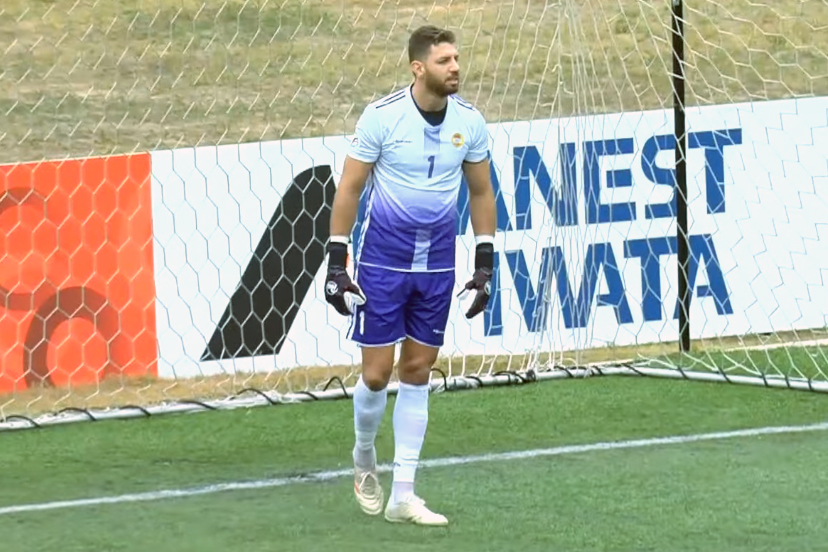
Khalil with Ahed in 2019

In July 2017, Khalil moved to Lebanese Premier League holders Ahed, for a fee of around $250,000. Khalil quickly asserted himself as the team's first-choice goalkeeper, playing 18 league games in the 2017–18 season. He helped his team win the domestic treble—the league title, cup, and Super Cup. Khalil was Ahed's goalkeeper at the 2018 AFC Cup, playing eight games and reaching the zonal semi-finals, where they lost to Al-Quwa Al-Jawiya 5–3 on aggregate. In his first season at the club, Khalil was included in the 2017–18 Lebanese Premier League Team of the Season as the league's best goalkeeper.

His next season with the team was also successful, as he won his second domestic treble. He played 21 league games in the 2018–19 season. Khalil featured in the 2018–19 Lebanese Premier League Team of the Season. On 4 November 2019, after beating April 25 1–0 in the final, he won the 2019 AFC Cup as the competition's Most Valuable Player, the first goalkeeper to do so. Conceding just three goals in 11 matches, Khalil kept nine clean sheets (of which five were consecutive in the knock-out stages) as Ahed went unbeaten throughout the whole tournament. The 2019 AFC Cup win was the first for a Lebanese club.

==== 2020: Loan to Zob Ahan ====
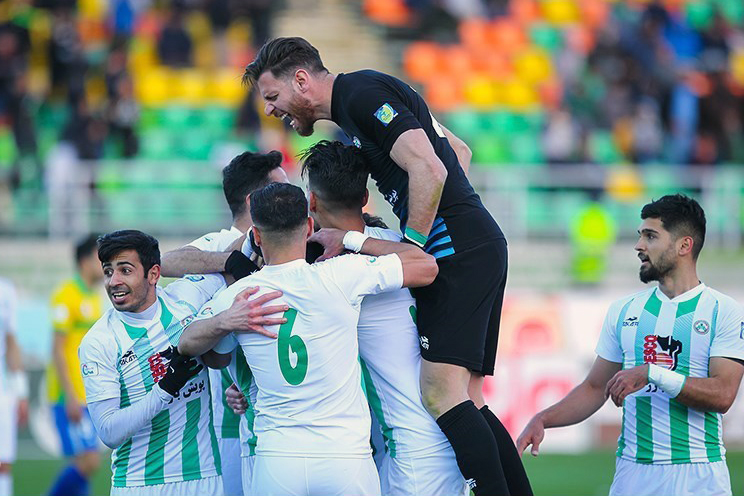
Khalil celebrating with his teammates at Zob Ahan in 2020

On 7 January 2020, Khalil joined Persian Gulf Pro League side Zob Ahan on a six-month loan, reuniting him with former Lebanon national team coach Miodrag Radulović. He cited the conditions in his country and the ambiguity surrounding the resumption of sports activity as the reasons for the transfer. Khalil became the fourth Lebanese player to play for the Iranian side, after Walid Ismail, Ali Hamam, and Rabih Ataya.

He made his league debut for Zob Ahan on 25 January 2020 against Pars Jonoubi Jam; despite being booked in the 64th minute, Khalil kept a clean sheet, helping his side win 1–0 at home. In Khalil's third game, on 7 February 2020, he again kept a 1–0 clean sheet against Sanat Naft, while being booked in the 89th minute. Thanks to his performances in the two fixtures, Khalil was included in the Team of the Week on both occasions. Khalil finished the 2019–20 season with eight games.

==== 2020–2023: Return to Ahed ====
Khalil (left) with Ahed against Ansar in 2020

Despite Zob Ahan extending Khalil's loan for an additional year on 27 June 2020, Khalil returned to Ahed as their first-choice goalkeeper. In the first matchday of the 2020–21 season on 4 October 2020, he helped Ahed win 3–2 over Bourj. Khalil played 12 league games, helping Ahed to a fourth-place finish with four clean sheets. He also played a game in the 2021 Lebanese Elite Cup, which Ahed won.

Due to an ACL injury he sustained while training with the Lebanon national team in August 2021, Khalil was sidelined for six months. He did not feature for Ahed during the 2021–22 season. Khalil returned to action as Ahed's first-choice goalkeeper in the first matchday of the 2022–23 season, against Akhaa Ahli Aley on 4 September 2022. He had played his previous league game 16 months prior, also against Akhaa, on 23 April 2021. On 28 October, Khalil saved a penalty and kept a clean sheet in a 1–0 league win against Tadamon Sour. He was a starter in 2022–23, playing 19 league games and helping Ahed win the league title as a key player.

==== 2023–2024: Loan to Al-Faisaly ====
On 15 June 2023, Ahed announced Khalil's loan for one season to Al-Faisaly in the Jordanian Pro League; he arrived in Jordan on 10 July. Khalil played in Al-Faisaly's last game in the 2023 Jordan Shield Cup, a 0–0 draw against Ma'an on 14 July, which won his team the tournament. He became the first foreign goalkeeper to play in the Jordan Super Cup, taking part in the 2023 edition between Al-Faisaly and Al-Wehdat which his side lost.

On 7 January 2024, Al-Faisaly announced the termination of his contract by mutual consent, following their elimination from the AFC Champions League group stage.

==== 2024: Loan to Safa ====
On 28 January 2024, Khalil returned to former club Safa on a six-month loan from Ahed. Khalil established himself as Safa's goalkeeper during the second half of the season, featuring in all seven of the club's league matches recorded during his loan spell.

==== 2024–2026: Last seasons at Ahed ====
Khalil returned to Ahed for the 2024–25 season, making one Lebanese Premier League appearance. He remained with Ahed for the 2025–26 season, where played an important role during the club's strong start to the league campaign, keeping a clean sheet in each of Ahed's first five league matches as the club won all five games and moved to the top of the table. Khalil made 21 appearances in all competitions, with Ahed eventually finishing in fourth place.

On 1 August 2026, Ahed announced Khalil's departure following the end of the 2025–26 season. With Ahed, he won four league titles, two FA Cups, three Super Cups, and one AFC Cup.

=== Sagesse ===
Following his departure from Ahed in August 2026, Khalil joined Sagesse.

== International career ==
Khalil was called up for Sierra Leone at the under-17 and under-20 levels, without featuring in any match. Eligible to represent Lebanon through his parents' nationality, Khalil received a call from former Lebanese international player Roda Antar in 2012, who informed him that national team coach Theo Bücker had called him for a training session.

Khalil made his debut for Lebanon in a 0–0 draw against Bahrain on 17 March 2013. He was part of the squad that played in the 2018 FIFA World Cup qualifiers between 2015 and 2016; initially Abbas Hassan's reserve for the first three matches, Khalil became Lebanon's first-choice goalkeeper in the final five games of the second round of qualification. Lebanon finished in second place in their group and, despite being eliminated from the World Cup, qualified them for to the final round of qualification for the 2019 AFC Asian Cup.

Drawn with North Korea, Hong Kong, and Malaysia, Khalil helped Lebanon finish top of the group unbeaten, conceding only four goals in six games. Lebanon reached the Asian Cup finals for the first time through qualification. Khalil was included on the 2019 AFC Asian Cup squad as Lebanon's main goalkeeper. In the first two group stage matches, Lebanon lost 2–0 to both Qatar and Saudi Arabia. Needing a win by four goals or more, Lebanon won 4–1 against North Korea for the first time in their history. However, the three points were not enough to qualify Lebanon for the knockout stage. Khalil played all 90 minutes in the three group stage games.

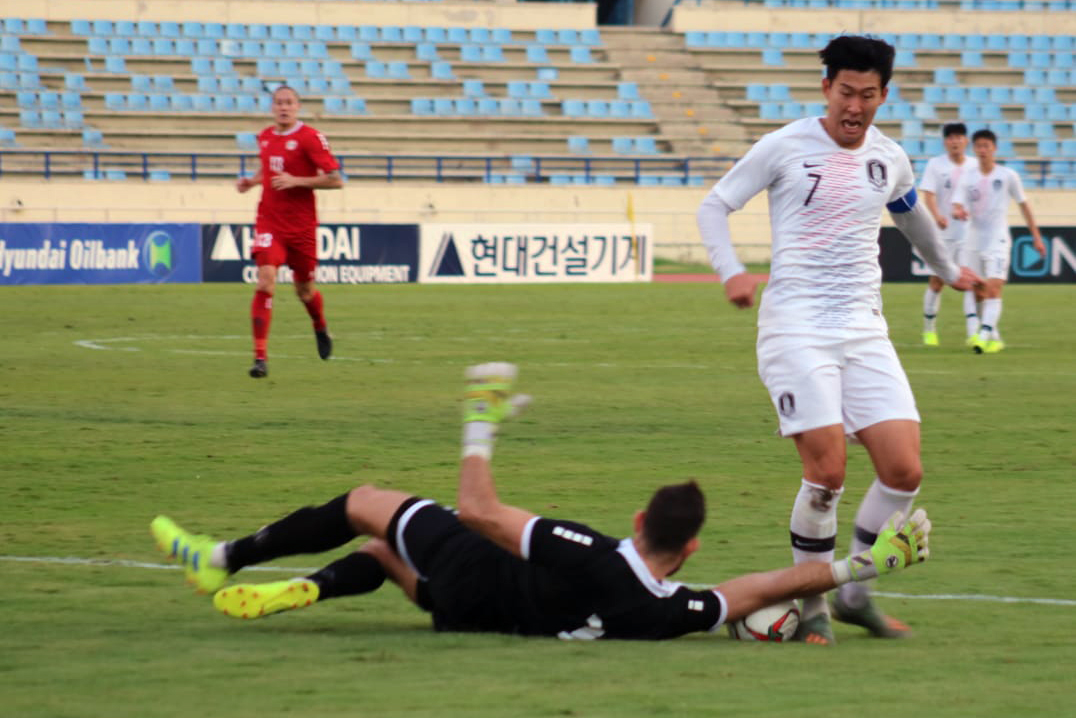
Khalil stopping a shot by South Korean forward Son Heung-min in 2019

In the second round of qualifying for the 2022 FIFA World Cup, in a group with South Korea, North Korea, Turkmenistan and Sri Lanka, Khalil took part in all six of Lebanon's games. (Note: Khalil took part in only one of Lebanon's two games against North Korea, which were both voided.) With three wins, one draw and two defeats, Lebanon finished second in their group and qualified to the final qualification round for the World Cup for the second time in their history, and the finals of the 2023 AFC Asian Cup for the second time. On 20 August 2021, during a training session in view of the first qualification game against the United Arab Emirates, Khalil sustained an ACL injury, keeping him on the sidelines for six months.

Following Khalil's ACL injury in 2021, Mostafa Matar became Lebanon's first-choice goalkeeper and retained the position after Khalil's return, with Khalil subsequently serving as the team's second-choice goalkeeper. He was called back up to the national team in September 2022 for a training camp in Bnachii, Zgharta, and played his first game on 19 November, in a 2–0 defeat to Kuwait. In December 2023, Khalil was included in the Lebanese squad for the 2023 AFC Asian Cup.

== Style of play ==
Known as "the Mountain" (Arabic: الجبل) because of his height, Khalil is a goalkeeper with good reflexes and a large physical presence. At 1.96 m (6.4 ft) tall, Khalil was the fifth tallest goalkeeper at the 2019 AFC Asian Cup. He is a fine shot stopper, and has a tendency to punch balls away from crosses. In 2011 his agent Patrick Mörck described him as a "resilient, witty, and responsive goalkeeper", drawing similarities to Swedish former goalkeeper Andreas Isaksson. The same year Magnus Pehrsson, his coach at Djurgården, reaffirmed the similarities with Isaksson, noting "his size and his actions".

== Personal life ==
Khalil's younger brother, Hadi, is also footballer who plays as a goalkeeper. His uncle, Hussein Khalil, was also a footballer; he encouraged Mehdi to pursue football as more than a hobby. Khalil's favourite club is Manchester United, and his favourite player is former Manchester United goalkeeper Edwin van der Sar. Other than football, Khalil enjoys tennis and swimming.

On 11 January 2020, Khalil and his partner Myriam Damoury got married. Their son Salim was born on 24 May 2021.

== Career statistics ==
=== International ===
As of match played 19 November 2024

Appearances and goals by national team and year
National team	Year	Apps	Goals
Lebanon	2013	1	0
Lebanon	2014	0	0
Lebanon	2015	7	0
Lebanon	2016	10	0
Lebanon	2017	6	0
Lebanon	2018	7	0
Lebanon	2019	10	0
Lebanon	2020	0	0
Lebanon	2021	6	0
Lebanon	2022	2	0
Lebanon	2023	6	0
Lebanon	2024	3	0
Total		58	0

== Honours ==
Safa

- Lebanese Premier League: 2012–13, 2015–16
- Lebanese FA Cup: 2013–14
- Lebanese Super Cup: 2013

Ahed

- AFC Cup: 2019
- Lebanese Premier League: 2017–18, 2018–19, 2021–22, 2022–23
- Lebanese FA Cup: 2017–18, 2018–19; runner-up: 2022–23
- Lebanese Elite Cup: 2022; runner-up: 2021
- Lebanese Super Cup: 2017, 2018, 2019

Al-Faisaly

- Jordan Shield Cup: 2023
- Jordan Super Cup runner-up: 2023

Individual

- AFC Cup Most Valuable Player: 2019
- Lebanese Premier League Team of the Season: 2015–16, 2017–18, 2018–19

== See also ==
- List of Lebanon international footballers
- List of Lebanon international footballers born outside Lebanon
