= Khalil Khamis (footballer, born 1995) =

Lebanese footballer (born 1995)

- Khamis with Lebanon in 2024

Personal information
- Full name: Khalil Georges Khamis
- Date of birth: 12 January 1995 (age 31)
- Place of birth: Zahlé, Lebanon
- Height: 1.89 m (6 ft 2 in)
- Position: Centre-back

Team information
- Current team: Nejmeh
- Number: 5

Youth career
- 2005–2013: Shabab Al Arabi

Senior career*
Years	Team	Apps	(Gls)
2013–2024	Ahed	150	(10)
2020	→ Pahang (loan)	4	(0)
2024–2025	Safa	24	(1)
2025–	Nejmeh	18	(1)

International career^{‡}
2013	Lebanon U19	3	(0)
2015–2017	Lebanon U23	6	(0)
2014–	Lebanon	25	(2)
- * Club domestic league appearances and goals as of 09:25, 3 August 2026 (UTC) ‡ National team caps and goals as of 17 November 2026

Khalil Georges Khamis (Arabic: خليل جورج خميس, Lebanese Arabic pronunciation: [xaˈliːl xaˈmiːs]; born 12 January 1995) is a Lebanese professional footballer who plays as a centre-back for Lebanese Premier League club Nejmeh and captains the Lebanon national team.

== Club career ==
=== Early career ===
Khamis participated in a competition held by McDonald's that offered the chance to take part in the Norway Cup youth tournament. After attending several try-out sessions in Jounieh, Lebanon, he was selected to join the team traveling to Norway aged 10.

During the Norway Cup, Khamis was noticed by Shabab Al Arabi, who subsequently signed him to their youth team. He remained with the club, progressing through all levels of their youth system.

=== Ahed ===
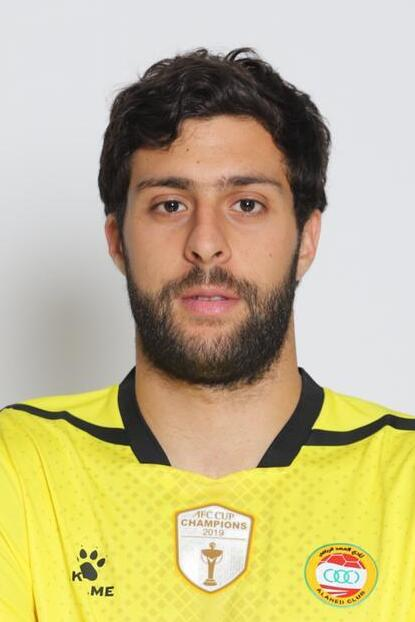
Khamis with Ahed in 2021

On 18 September 2013, Khamis joined Ahed in the Lebanese Premier League. Despite missing the final due to injury, Khamis helped Ahed lift the 2019 AFC Cup title.

On 13 February 2020, Khamis joined Malaysia Super League side Pahang on a season-long loan from Ahed.

=== Safa ===
After 11 years at Ahed, Khamis moved to Safa on 2 August 2024.

=== Nejmeh ===
In August 2025, Khamis joined Nejmeh ahead of the 2025–26 season. On 1 September 2026, his contract was renewed for two further seasons.

== International career ==
Khamis was first called up to the Lebanon national team in November 2014, as part of a mixed squad of senior and Olympic players for a friendly match against the United Arab Emirates on 6 November.

On 6 January 2024, Khamis was called up to the Lebanon squad for the 2023 AFC Asian Cup, replacing George Felix Melki who withdrew injured before the competition. He scored his first international goal on 15 December 2024, in a friendly 2–0 win against Kuwait.

== Career statistics ==
=== International ===
As of match played 17 November 2026

Appearances and goals by national team and year
National team	Year	Apps	Goals
Lebanon	2014	1	0
Lebanon	2015	0	0
Lebanon	2016	0	0
Lebanon	2017	0	0
Lebanon	2018	0	0
Lebanon	2019	1	0
Lebanon	2020	0	0
Lebanon	2021	0	0
Lebanon	2022	0	0
Lebanon	2023	1	0
Lebanon	2024	11	1
Lebanon	2025	6	1
Lebanon	2026	5	0
Total		25	2

Scores and results list Lebanon's goal tally first, score column indicates score after each Khamis goal.

List of international goals scored by Khalil Khamis
No.	Date	Venue	Opponent	Score	Result	Competition
1	15 December 2024	Suheim bin Hamad Stadium, Doha, Qatar	Kuwait	2–0	2–0	Friendly
2	26 November 2025	Al Gharafa Stadium, Al Rayyan, Qatar	Sudan	1–0	1–2	2025 FIFA Arab Cup qualification

== Honours ==
Ahed

- Lebanese Premier League: 2014–15, 2016–17, 2017–18, 2018–19, 2021–22, 2022–23
- Lebanese FA Cup: 2017–18, 2018–19; runner-up: 2022–23, 2023–24
- Lebanese Federation Cup: 2023
- Lebanese Elite Cup: 2015; runner-up: 2021
- Lebanese Super Cup: 2015, 2017, 2018, 2019
- AFC Cup: 2019; runner-up: 2023–24

Nejmeh

- Lebanese FA Cup: 2025–26

Individual

- Lebanese Premier League Team of the Season: 2014–15, 2015–16, 2018–19
