= Hussein Dakik =

Lebanese footballer (born 1988)

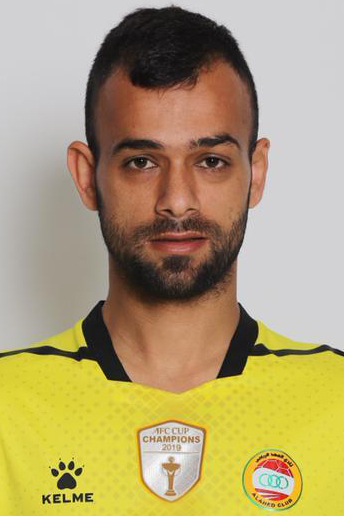
- Dakik with Ahed in 2021

Personal information
- Full name: Hussein Ali Dakik
- Date of birth: 10 November 1988 (age 38)
- Place of birth: Jdeideh, Lebanon
- Height: 1.80 m (5 ft 11 in)
- Position: Full-back

Team information
- Current team: Ahed
- Number: 8

Senior career*
Years	Team	Apps	(Gls)
2008–2009	Shabab Sahel		(3)
2009–	Ahed	196+	(22)
2023	→ Bourj (loan)	0	(0)

International career
2009–2012	Lebanon	17	(0)
- * Club domestic league appearances and goals as of 21:08, 24 April 2021 (UTC)

Hussein Ali Dakik (Arabic: حسين علي دقيق; born 10 November 1988) is a Lebanese professional footballer who plays as a full-back for Lebanese Premier League club Ahed, whom he captains.

== Club career ==
Dakik was included in the Lebanese Premier League Team of the Season in 2009–10, 2010–11, 2011–12, 2015–16, and 2018–19.

On 30 June 2023, Dakik renewed his contract with Ahed for three seasons. He was sent on loan to Bourj in April 2023 for the second leg of the 2023 Arab Club Champions Cup match against Al Wahda.

== Honours ==
Ahed

- Lebanese Premier League: 2009–10, 2010–11, 2014–15, 2016–17, 2017–18, 2018–19, 2021–22, 2022–23
- Lebanese FA Cup: 2017–18, 2018–19; runner-up: 2022–23, 2023–24
- Lebanese Federation Cup: 2023
- Lebanese Elite Cup: 2010, 2011, 2013, 2015, 2022; runner-up: 2021
- Lebanese Super Cup: 2011, 2015, 2017, 2018, 2019; runner-up: 2023
- AFC Cup: 2019; runner-up: 2023–24

Individual

- Lebanese Premier League Team of the Season: 2009–10, 2010–11, 2011–12, 2015–16, 2018–19
