= Haytham Faour =

Lebanese footballer (born 1990)

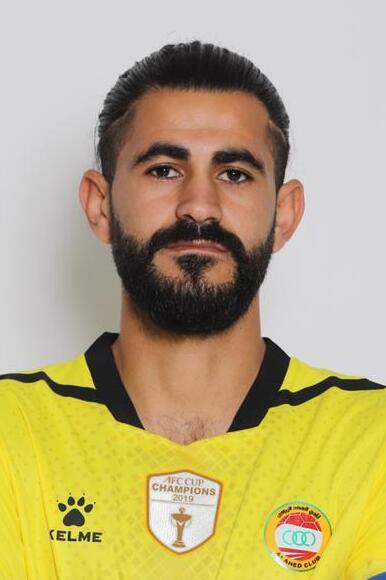
- Faour with Ahed in 2021

Personal information
- Full name: Haytham Moussa Faour
- Date of birth: 27 February 1990 (age 36)
- Place of birth: Meiss Ej Jabal, Lebanon
- Height: 1.76 m (5 ft 9 in)
- Position: Defensive midfielder

Team information
- Current team: Irshad Chehim

Youth career
- 2007–2009: Ahed

Senior career*
Years	Team	Apps	(Gls)
2009–2023	Ahed	211+	(2+)
2023–2025	Shabab Sahel	24	(1)
2025	Nejmeh	8	(0)
2026	Akhaa Ahli Aley	16	(0)
2026–	Irshad Chehim	0	(0)

International career
2011	Lebanon U23	2	(0)
2011–2019	Lebanon	61	(0)
- * Club domestic league appearances and goals as of 26 July 2026

Haytham Moussa Faour (Arabic: هيثم موسى فاعور; born 27 February 1990) is a Lebanese footballer who plays as a defensive midfielder for Lebanese Second Division club Irshad Chehim.

Faour made his senior debut for Ahed in 2009 and became one of the team's main players, winning the Lebanese Golden Ball in 2015. He also captained them to an AFC Cup win in 2019, helping Ahed become the first Lebanese club to win the title. Faour left Ahed in 2023 after 16 years at the club, and signed for Shabab Sahel. He then played for Nejmeh, before moving to Akhaa Ahli Aley and Irshad Chehim in 2026 in the Lebanese Second Division.

Faour represented Lebanon internationally from 2011 to 2019, playing 61 games and retiring as one of the national team's most-capped players.

== Club career ==
On 2 October 2013, it was reported that Faour had signed for Iraqi club Al-Naft on a loan deal worth $140,000. After playing a friendly game for the club, the manager cancelled the transfer as he stated that he was looking for a "more attacking-minded midfielder".

On 31 May 2023, after having played 16 years at Ahed, Shabab Sahel announced the signing of Faour on a three-year contract. On 28 March 2025, he joined Nejmeh on a free transfer ahead of the second half of the 2024–25 season. Faour moved to Akhaa Ahli Aley in the Lebanese Second Division for the second half of the 2025–26 season. In August 2026, He joined Second Division club Irshad Chehim.

== International career ==
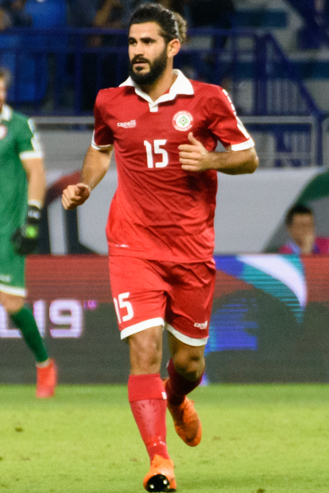
Faour with Lebanon at the 2019 AFC Asian Cup

Faour's debut for the national team came on 17 August 2011, in a 3–2 friendly defeat against Syria at home. In December 2018, he was called up for the 2019 AFC Asian Cup squad. Faour played the first two group stage games, against Qatar and Saudi Arabia. On 24 July 2019, he announced his retirement from international football.

== Style of play ==
Faour is known for his tackling and defensive reading of the game.

== Honours ==
Ahed

- AFC Cup: 2019
- Lebanese Premier League: 2009–10, 2010–11, 2014–15, 2016–17, 2017–18, 2018–19, 2021–22, 2022–23
- Lebanese FA Cup: 2017–18, 2018–19; runner-up: 2022–23
- Lebanese Elite Cup: 2010, 2011, 2013, 2015, 2022; runner-up: 2021
- Lebanese Super Cup: 2011, 2015, 2017, 2018, 2019

Individual

- Lebanese Premier League Best Player: 2014–15
- Lebanese Premier League Team of the Season: 2011–12, 2012–13, 2014–15, 2016–17, 2017–18

== See also ==
- List of Lebanon international footballers
