= An Tae-song =

North Korean footballer (born 1993)

Personal information
- Date of birth: October 21, 1993 (age 33)
- Place of birth: Pyongyang, North Korea
- Height: 1.86 m (6 ft 1 in)
- Position: Goalkeeper

Team information
- Current team: April 25
- Number: 21

Senior career*
Years	Team	Apps	(Gls)
- April 25

International career^{‡}
2014–2017	North Korea U20	4	(0)
2017–	North Korea	6	(0)
- * Club domestic league appearances and goals ‡ National team caps and goals as of 26 January 2020

An Tae-song (Korean: 안대성; born 21 October 1993) is a North Korean international football player. He plays club football with April 25 of the DPR Korea Premier Football League.

== Club career ==
During the 2019 AFC Cup, An made headlines for receiving the red card in the Final Match playing against Al Ahed FC.
