= 2012 in Iraqi football =

This article details the fixtures and results of the Iraq national football team in 2012.

== Schedule ==
=== Friendlies ===
2 January 2012	Lebanon	1 – 0	Iraq	(Lebanon) Saida Municipal Stadium, Sidon
	Zreik 66'

17 April 2012	Iraq	0 – 0	Egypt	(United Arab Emirates) Maktoum Bin Rashid Al Maktoum Stadium, Dubai

23 May 2012	Iraq	1 – 0	Sierra Leone	(Turkey) Atatürk Olympic Stadium, Istanbul
	Akram 5'	Report		Attendance: 200

28 May 2012	Iraq	1 – 1	Botswana	(Qatar) Ahmed bin Ali Stadium, Al Rayyan
	Jassim 5'		90+1' Tshireletso
