= Hussein Zein =

Lebanese footballer (born 1995)

- Zein with Lebanon in 2024

Personal information
- Full name: Hussein Ali Zein
- Date of birth: 27 January 1995 (age 31)
- Place of birth: Sidon, Lebanon
- Height: 1.76 m (5 ft 9 in)
- Position: Right-back

Team information
- Current team: Nejmeh
- Number: 6

Senior career*
Years	Team	Apps	(Gls)
2012–2024	Ahed	181	(13)
2024–2025	Safa	25	(1)
2025–	Nejmeh	21	(0)

International career^{‡}
2013	Lebanon U19	1	(0)
2015–2017	Lebanon U23	6	(0)
2016–	Lebanon	49	(0)
- * Club domestic league appearances and goals as of 09:27, 3 August 2026 (UTC) ‡ National team caps and goals as of 4 June 2026

Hussein Ali Zein (Arabic: حسين علي زين, Lebanese Arabic pronunciation: [ħ(u)seːn zeːn]; born 27 January 1995) is a Lebanese footballer who plays as a right-back for Lebanese Premier League club Nejmeh and the Lebanon national team.

== Club career ==
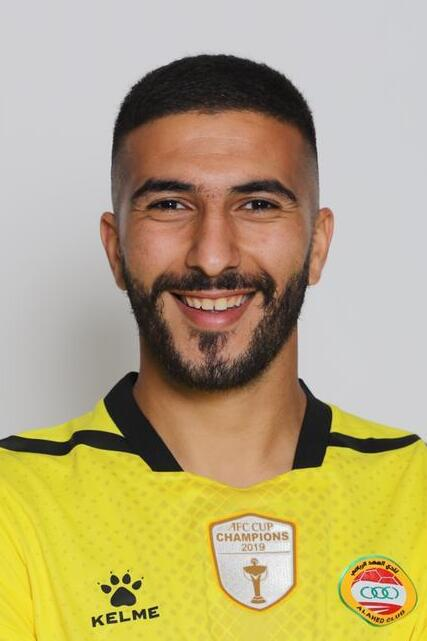
Zein with Ahed in 2021

On 2 August 2024, Zein moved to Safa. In August 2025, Zein joined Nejmeh ahead of the 2025–26 season. In August 2026, he renewed his contract with Nejmeh for two further years.

== International career ==
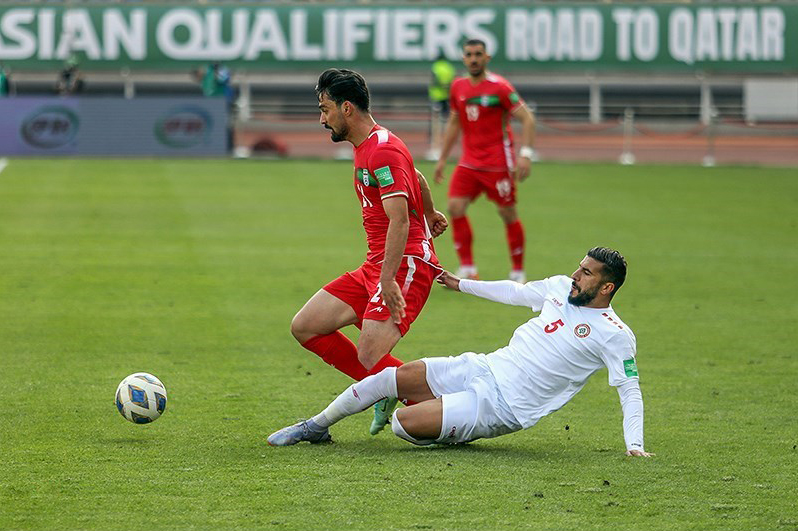
Zein (right) with the Lebanon national team against Iran in 2022

Zein played for the national under-19 team between 2013 and 2014. He also represented the under-23 team between 2015 and 2017, playing six times.

Zein made his debut for the senior team on 5 February 2016, in a 2–0 defeat against Bahrain in a friendly game. He also participated at the 2019 WAFF Championship in Iraq. In December 2023, Zein was included in the Lebanese squad for the 2023 AFC Asian Cup.

== Career statistics ==
=== International ===
As of match played 4 June 2026

Appearances and goals by national team and year
National team	Year	Apps	Goals
Lebanon	2016	1	0
Lebanon	2017	0	0
Lebanon	2018	0	0
Lebanon	2019	3	0
Lebanon	2020	1	0
Lebanon	2021	7	0
Lebanon	2022	5	0
Lebanon	2023	12	0
Lebanon	2024	11	0
Lebanon	2025	8	0
Lebanon	2026	1	0
Total		49	0

== Honours ==
Ahed

- Lebanese Premier League: 2014–15, 2016–17, 2017–18, 2018–19, 2021–22, 2022–23
- Lebanese FA Cup: 2017–18, 2018–19; runner-up: 2022–23, 2023–24
- Lebanese Elite Cup: 2013, 2015, 2022; runner-up: 2021
- Lebanese Super Cup: 2015, 2017, 2018, 2019
- AFC Cup: 2019; runner-up: 2023–24

Nejmeh

- Lebanese FA Cup: 2025–26

Individual

- Lebanese Premier League Team of the Season: 2014–15, 2017–18, 2018–19
