= Issah Yakubu =

Ghanaian footballer (born 1992)

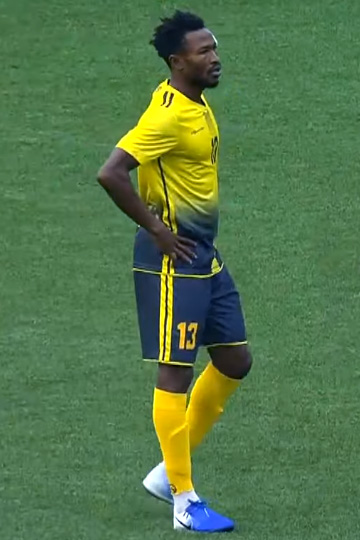
- Yakubu with Ahed in 2019

Personal information
- Full name: Issah Yakubu
- Date of birth: 17 December 1992 (age 33)
- Place of birth: Techiman, Ghana
- Position: Midfielder

Team information
- Current team: Holy Stars
- Number: 22

Senior career*
Years	Team	Apps	(Gls)
2010–2012	Liberty Professionals		
2012–2013	Asante Kotoko		
2014–2015	Al-Nasr		
2014	→ BA Stars (loan)		
2015	→ Inter Allies (loan)	14	(1)
2015–2016	Nabi Chit	21	(4)
2016–2017	Shabab Sahel	19	(2)
2017–2020	Ahed	39	(6)
2020	→ Al-Arabi (loan)		(1)
2020–2021	Al-Arabi		(1)
2021–2022	Fujairah	22	(5)
2022–2023	Ahed	9	(2)
2024–	Holy Stars	51	(4)
- * Club domestic league appearances and goals as of 24 May 2026

Issah Yakubu (born 17 December 1992) is a Ghanaian professional footballer who plays as a midfielder for Ghanaian club Holy Stars.

== Career ==
=== Ghana and Libya ===
Starting his senior career in 2010 at Liberty Professionals, Yakubu joined Asante Kotoko in 2012, before moving to Libyan side Al-Nasr the following year on a free transfer. In September 2014, Yakubu moved back to his native Ghana at BA Stars on loan, before ending the season at Inter Allies on another loan in 2015; he played 14 games and scored once in the Ghana Premier League for the side.

=== Lebanon ===
On 28 September 2015, Yakubu moved to Lebanon, joining Nabi Chit on a two-year contract, with whom he played 21 games and scored four in the league.

The following season, he moved to Shabab Sahel where he scored twice in 19 league games. Ahed signed Yakubu in 2017 on a two-year deal.

On 4 November 2019, Yakubu scored a header against North Korean side April 25 in the 2019 AFC Cup Final; the match ended in a 1–0 win, as he helped his side become the first Lebanese side to win the competition. He was nominated Man of the Match for his performance.

=== Al-Arabi and Fujairah ===
On 21 January 2020, Yakubu was sent on a six-month loan to Kuwaiti side Al-Arabi. In August 2020, Yakubu moved to Al-Arabi permanently in a deal worth $USD100,000.

On 19 September 2021, Yakubu joined Fujairah FC in the UAE First Division League.

=== Return to Ahed ===
In December 2022, Yakubu returned to Ahed ahead of the second half of the 2022–23 Lebanese Premier League.

=== Holy Stars ===
Yakubu returned to Ghana in 2024, playing for Holy Stars in the 2024–25 Ghana Premier League.

== Honours ==
Asante Kotoko

- Ghana Premier League: 2012–13
- Ghana Super Cup: 2012

Ahed

- Lebanese Premier League: 2017–18, 2018–19
- Lebanese FA Cup: 2017–18, 2018–19; runner-up: 2022–23
- Lebanese Super Cup: 2017, 2018, 2019
- AFC Cup: 2019

Individual

- Lebanese Premier League Best Foreign Player: 2017–18
- Lebanese Premier League Team of the Season: 2017–18, 2018–19
