= 2012 Lebanese Elite Cup =

Lebanese Elite Cup
- Season: 2012
- Champions: Al Safa
- Matches: 9
- Goals: 30 (3.33 per match)

The 2012 Lebanese Elite Cup is the 15th edition of this football tournament in Lebanon. The competition started on 4 August. This tournament includes the six best teams from the 2011–12 Lebanese Premier League season.

== Group stage ==
=== Group A ===
Team	Pld	W	D	L	GF	GA	GD	Pts
(Lebanon) Al Ahed	2	2	0	0	4	0	+4	6
(Lebanon) Safa	2	1	0	1	6	3	+3	3
(Lebanon) Al-Akhaa Al-Ahli Aley	2	0	0	2	1	8	−7	0

4 August 2012
16:00

Safa	0 – 2	Al Ahed

11 August 2012
15:00

Safa	6 – 1	Al-Akhaa Al-Ahli Aley

18 August 2012
15:00

Al Ahed	2 – 0	Al-Akhaa Al-Ahli Aley

=== Group B ===
Team	Pld	W	D	L	GF	GA	GD	Pts
(Lebanon) Al-Ansar	2	1	1	0	3	2	+1	4
(Lebanon) Al-Nejmeh	2	1	0	1	7	4	+3	3
(Lebanon) Shabab Al-Sahel	2	0	1	1	3	7	−4	1

5 August 2012
16:00

Shabab Al-Sahel	1 – 1	Al Ansar

12 August 2012
15:00

Al Ansar	2 – 1	Al-Nejmeh

19 August 2012
16:00

Al-Nejmeh	6 – 2	Shabab Al-Sahel

== Final Stage ==
Semi-finals
25 August - Beirut
Al Ahed	2
Al-Nejmeh	1
26 August - Beirut
Al-Ansar	0
Safa	1

Final
17 September - Beirut
Al Ahed	0
Safa	2

=== Semi finals ===
25 August
15:00

Al Ahed	2 – 1	Al-Nejmeh

26 August
15:00

Al-Ansar	0 – 1	Safa

=== Final ===
17 September 2012
18:00

Al Ahed	0 – 2 (aet)	Safa

Camille Chamoun Sports City Stadium, Beirut
