= 2018 Ýokary Liga =

Ýokary Liga
- Season: 2018

2018 Ýokary Liga season was the 26th edition of the top tier professional Yokary Liga football annual competition in Turkmenistan administered by the Football Federation of Turkmenistan. It began on 3 March 2018.

== League table ==
Pos	Team	Pld	W	D	L	GF	GA	GD	Pts	Qualification or relegation
1	Altyn Asyr	28	21	3	4	65	16	+49	66	2019 AFC Cup Group Stage
2	Ahal	28	18	6	4	55	22	+33	60	2019 AFC Cup Preliminary Round (Note: Kopetdag would've qualified as 2018 Turkmenistan Cup winners, however as they didn't have an AFC Cup license, the AFC Cup spot was given to the next highest-placed team who hadn't already qualified yet, Ahal.)
3	Energetik Türkmenbaşy	28	12	6	10	26	27	−1	42	
4	Shagadam	28	12	5	11	25	34	−9	41	
5	Merw	28	6	11	11	26	34	−8	29	
6	Kopetdag	28	8	5	15	27	39	−12	29	
7	Ashgabat	28	7	6	15	23	41	−18	27	
8	Balkan	28	6	2	20	30	64	−34	20	

Source: FIFA TFF
Rules for classification: 1) points; 2) goal difference; 3) number of goals scored.

== Top goal-scorers ==
Rank	Player	Club	Goals (penalty)
1	Altymyrat Annadurdyýew	FC Altyn Asyr	19
2	Süleýman Muhadow	FC Ahal	17
