= 2017–18 Sultan Qaboos Cup =

Tournament details
- Country: Oman

The 2017–18 Sultan Qaboos Cup was the 45th season of the national football competition of Oman. The winner of the competition earned a spot in the 2019 AFC Cup.

The competition started on 28 October 2017.

== Qualification round ==
=== Round 1 ===
28 October 2017	Madha	2–3	Quriyat

28 October 2017	Ahli Sidab	1–1 (4–3 p)	Ibri

28 October 2017	Al-Ittihad	1–2	Al Ettifaq

=== Round 2 ===
4 November 2017	Smail	2–1	Ibri

4 November 2017	Madha	1–4	Al-Ittihad

== Round of 32 ==
17 November 2017	Al-Nahda	1–1 (1–3 p)	Al-Nasr

17 November 2017	Al Oruba	1–1 (3–4 p)	Nizwa

17 November 2017	Al Salam	0–1	Sur

17 November 2017	Al-Rustaq	2–1	Al Ettifaq

17 November 2017	Smail	1–0	Al-Musannah

17 November 2017	Al-Shabab	2–0	Mjees

17 November 2017	Sohar	3–0	Bahla

17 November 2017	Busher	1–2	Al-Ahli / Sedab

19 November 2017	Saham	1–1 (4–3 p)	Dhofar

19 November 2017	Al Seeb	2–0	Salalah

19 November 2017	Al Bdea	3–1	Al-Ittihad

19 November 2017	Al Bashair	3–0	Muscat

19 November 2017	Mrbat	1–1 (5–6 p)	Oman Club

19 November 2017	Al Suwaiq	4–0	Quriyat

19 November 2017	Al-Mudhaibi	2–1	Fanja

19 November 2017	Jaalan	0–3	Al Wasta

== Round of 16 ==
2 February 2018	Al Wasta	0–3	Sur

2 February 2018	Al Bashair	0–0 (4–3 p)	Smail

2 February 2018	Al-Nasr	5–0	Al-Rustaq

2 February 2018	Sohar	0–0 (5–4 p)	Al-Mudhaibi

3 February 2018	Al-Shabab	3–1	Nizwa

3 February 2018	Al Bdea	0–3	Al-Ahli / Sedab

3 February 2018	Saham	1–2	Al Seeb

3 February 2018	Oman Club	0–1	Al Suwaiq

== Quarter finals ==
=== First leg ===
16 February 2018	Al-Shabab	1–0	Sur

16 February 2018	Al-Ahli / Sedab	0–0	Sohar

16 February 2018	Al Bashair	1–3	Al-Nasr

16 February 2018	Al Seeb	1–0	Al Suwaiq

=== Second leg ===
21 February 2018	Sohar	2–0	Al-Ahli / Sedab

21 February 2018	Sur	3–2	Al-Shabab

21 February 2018	Al-Nasr	1–0	Al Bashair

21 February 2018	Al Suwaiq	0–0	Al Seeb

== Semi-finals ==
=== First leg ===
16 March 2018	Al-Shabab	1–3	Al-Nasr
14:35

16 March 2018	Sohar	4–1	Al Seeb
17:00

=== Second leg ===
30 March 2018	Al Seeb	2–1	Sohar
14:40

30 March 2018	Al-Nasr	1–1	Al-Shabab
17:30

== Final ==
5 April 2018	Sohar	2–2 (a.e.t.) (5–6 p)	Al-Nasr
17:00				Referee: Qassim Al-Hatmi
