= 2019 Lebanese Super Cup =

20th edition of the Lebanese Super Cup

| Ansar | Ahed |
| 1 | 2 |
- Date: 15 September 2019
- Venue: Saida Municipal Stadium, Sidon
- Man of the Match: Ahmed Akaïchi
- Referee: Mohammed Darwish
- Attendance: 5,000

The 2019 Lebanese Super Cup was the 20th Lebanese Super Cup, an annual football match played between the winners of the previous season's Lebanese Premier League and Lebanese FA Cup. As Ahed won both competitions in 2019, their opponents were the 2018–19 Lebanese Premier League runners-up, Ansar.

The match was played at the Saida Municipal Stadium on 15 September 2019. Ahed defended the trophy they won in 2018, winning 2–1 thanks to an Ahmed Akaïchi brace.

== Match ==
=== Summary ===
Ansar opened the scoring in the 24th minute after Ahed defender Khalil Khamis scored in his own net after a cross from Hassan Chaito "Shibriko". In the 26th minute, Ahed equalized the score through Tunisian forward Ahmed Akaichi after a cross by Mohamed Haidar bounced off by Abdallah Taleb. Ahed took the lead through a second goal by Ahmed Akaichi in the 42nd minute after a great individual effort, where he passed all the players who faced him and sent the ball towards the right corner of the goal, scoring the second goal for him and his team.

=== Details ===
15 September 2019
16:00 UTC+3

| Ansar | 1–2 | Ahed |
|---|---|---|
| Khamis 24' (o.g.) | Report | Akaïchi 26', 42' |

Saida Municipal Stadium, Sidon
Attendance: 5,000
Referee: Mohammed Darwish

| Ansar | Ahed |

| GK | 31 | (Lebanon) Nazih Assad |
| RB | 30 | (Lebanon) Hassan Bittar | | (substituted off) 59' |
| CB | 93 | (Guinea) Aboubacar Leo Camara | (yellow card) 85' |
| CB | 21 | (Lebanon) Abdullah Taleb |
| LB | 16 | (Lebanon) Hassan "Shibriko" Chaito (c) |
| CM | 24 | (Tunisia) Houssem Louati | | (substituted off) 82' |
| CM | 6 | (Lebanon) Adnan Haidar |
| CM | 7 | (Lebanon) Hassan Maatouk |
| RF | 20 | (Lebanon) Hassan "Moni" Chaito | (yellow card) 45+2' | (substituted off) 59' |
| CF | 9 | (Senegal) El Hadji Malick Tall | Booked |
| LF | 8 | (Lebanon) Soony Saad |
Substitutes:
| GK | 1 | (Lebanon) Hassan Moghnieh |
| DF | 3 | (Lebanon) Mootaz El Jounaidi |
| DF | 17 | (Lebanon) Hassan Hmood |
| DF | 19 | (Lebanon) Alfredo Juraidini | (yellow card) 60' | (substituted on) 59' |
| MF | 10 | (Lebanon) Abbas Ali Atwi | (yellow card) 90+4' | (substituted on) 59' |
| MF | 99 | (Lebanon) Moussa Tawil |
| FW | 12 | (Lebanon) Kassem El Choum |
| FW | 22 | (Lebanon) Mahmoud Kojok | | (substituted on) 82' |
| FW | 23 | (Lebanon) Jihad Ayoub |
Manager:
(Syria) Nizar Mahrous

| GK | 21 | (Lebanon) Mohamad Hamoud |
| RB | 6 | (Lebanon) Hussein Zein | (yellow card) 90+5' |
| CB | 4 | (Lebanon) Nour Mansour |
| CB | 5 | (Lebanon) Khalil Khamis |
| LB | 6 | (Lebanon) Hussein Dakik |
| CM | 15 | (Lebanon) Haytham Faour (c) | (yellow card) 37' |
| CM | 14 | (Lebanon) Walid Shour | (yellow card) 76' | (substituted off) 76' |
| RM | 20 | (Lebanon) Rabih Ataya |
| AM | 10 | (Lebanon) Mohamad Haidar |
| LM | 11 | (Lebanon) Ahmad Zreik | | (substituted off) 45+1' |
| CF | 99 | (Tunisia) Ahmed Akaïchi | | (substituted off) 82' |
Substitutes:
| GK | 98 | (Lebanon) Hadi Khalil |
| DF | 2 | (Lebanon) Jamal Khalifeh |
| DF | 17 | (Lebanon) Mahmoud Majed |
| DF | 23 | (Lebanon) Ali Hadid | | (substituted on) 82' |
| MF | 7 | (Lebanon) Hussein Monzer | | (substituted on) 76' |
| MF | 18 | (Lebanon) Ali Sweidan |
| FW | 22 | (Lebanon) Mohamad Kdouh |
| FW | 30 | (Lebanon) Tarek Al Ali | | (substituted on) 45+1' |
| | 13 | (Lebanon) Mohamad Malak |
Manager:
(Lebanon) Bassem Marmar

Man of the Match:
Ahmed Akaïchi (Ahed)

Assistant referees:
Mohamad Ramel
Tayseer Bader
Jameel Ramadan

Match rules

- 90 minutes
- Penalty shoot-out if scores level
- Nine named substitutes
