= 2008–09 Lebanese FA Cup =

The 2009 version of the Lebanese FA Cup is the 37th edition to be played. It is the premier knockout tournament for football teams in Lebanon.

Al-Mabarrah went into this edition as the holders. Al Ansar holds the most wins with 11 titles.

The cup winner were guaranteed a place in the 2010 AFC Cup.

== Round 1 ==
18 teams play a knockout tie. 8 clubs advance to the next round, 1 club gets a bye to the 3rd round. Ties played over 11 to 15 October 2008

Tie no	Home team	Score	Away team
1	Al-Ikhlas b. h.	5–2	Al-Khoyol
2	Unknown Club	2–6	Naser Bar Elias
3	Al- Ahly Saida	4–1	Al Akha Ahly Aley
4	Al-Burj	0–3	Alahli Nabatiyé
5	Almodh Tripoli	1–5	Homenmen
6	Al Ijtimaaey Tripoli	2–1	Al-Nahaza Bar Elias
7	Homenetmen	1–0	Al-Mahabba trables
8	Al-Irshad	3–0	Al-Riadah wal Adab
9	Nasr Bar Elias	0–1	Al-Shabeeba Al-Mazraa

== Round 2 ==
8 teams play a knockout tie. 4 clubs advance to the next round. Ties played on 21 October 2008

Tie no	Home team	Score	Away team
1	Al-Shabeeba Al-Mazraa	3–2	Al-Ikhlas b. h.
2	Al-Ahly Saida	4–1	Al-Ahli Nabatiyé
3	Homenmen	4–1	Al Ijtimaaey Tripoli
4	Homenetmen	4–3	Al-Irshad

== Round 3 ==
16 teams play a knockout tie. 8 clubs advance to the next round. Ties played over 26 & 28 December 2008

Tie no	Home team	Score	Away team
1	Tadamon Sour	0–0	Salam Zgharta
Tadamon Sour won 4 – 2 on penalties
2	Al-Nejmeh	6–0	Trables Sports Club
3	Shabab Sahel	7–0	Homenmen
4	Al-Mabarrah	3–0	Homenetmen
5	Al-Safa	7–0	Al-Shabeeba Al-Mazraa
6	Al-Ansar	1 -0	Al-Ahly Saida
7	Al Ahed	2–1	Racing Beirut
8	Hekmeh	1–0	Shabab Al-Ghazieh

== Quarter finals ==
8 teams play a knockout tie. 4 clubs advance to the semi-finals. Ties played on 1 February 2009

Tie no	Home team	Score	Away team
1	Al-Nejmeh	1–3	Al-Ansar
2	Al-Ahed	2–0	Al-Mabarrah
3	Shabab Sahel	3–1	Tadamon Sour
4	Hekmeh	0–2	Al-Safa

== Semi finals ==
4 teams play a knockout tie. 2 clubs advance to the Final Ties played on 24 February 2009

Tie no	Home team	Score	Away team
1	Shabab Sahel	3–2	Al-Safa
2	Al-Ahed	2–1	Al-Ansar

== Final ==
Final played on 13 May 2009

Tie no	Home team	Score	Away team
1	Shabab Sahel	0–2	Al-Ahed

Lebanese FA Cup
2009 Winners
Al Ahed
3rd Title
