= 2010 Lebanese Elite Cup =

Lebanese Elite Cup
- Season: 2010
- Champions: Al Ahed
- Matches: 9
- Goals: 15 (1.67 per match)

The 2010 Lebanese Elite Cup is the 13th edition of this football tournament in Lebanon. It was held from August to September 2010. This tournament includes the six best teams from the 2009–10 Lebanese Premier League season.

== Groups ==
Group A	Group B
Al Ahed; Al-Mabarrah; Racing Beirut	Al-Ansar; Al-Nejmeh; Safa

=== Group A ===
Team	Pld	W	D	L	GF	GA	GD	Pts
Al Ahed	2	2	0	0	4	0	+4	6
Racing Beirut	2	0	1	1	1	2	−1	1
Al-Mabarrah	2	0	1	1	1	4	−3	1

12 September 2010

Al Ahed	3–0	Al-Mabarrah
Halaq 17', 63'; Daqiq 68'

Bourj Hammoud Stadium, Beirut

15 September 2010

Al Ahed	1–0	Racing Beirut
Alawieh 29'

Saida Municipal Stadium, Saida

18 September 2010

Al-Mabarrah	1–1	Racing Beirut
Hammoud 38'

Beirut Municipality Stadium, Beirut

=== Group B ===
Team	Pld	W	D	L	GF	GA	GD	Pts
Al-Ansar	2	1	1	0	2	1	+1	4
Al-Nejmeh	2	0	2	0	1	1	0	2
Safa	2	0	1	1	2	3	−1	1

13 September 2010

Al-Ansar	0–0	Al-Nejmeh

Saida Municipal Stadium, Saida

16 September 2010

Al-Ansar	2–1	Safa

Beirut Municipality Stadium, Beirut

19 September 2010

Al-Nejmeh	1–1	Safa

Saida Municipal Stadium, Saida

== Final stage ==
=== Semifinals ===
22 September 2010

Al Ahed	1–1 5 – 4 (p)	Al-Nejmeh
Ah. Moghrabi 97' (o.g.)		Ak. Moghrab 103'

Saida Municipal Stadium, Saida

23 September 2010

Al-Ansar	2–0	Racing Beirut

Saida Municipal Stadium, Saida

=== Final ===
26 September 2010

Al Ahed	0–0 4 – 3 (p)	Al-Ansar

Saida Municipal Stadium, Saida

Lebanese Elite Cup
2010 Winners

Al Ahed
2nd Title
