= Al Ahed FC =

Association football club in Beirut, Lebanon

Ahed
- Full name: Al Ahed Football Club
- Nickname: القلعة الصفراء (The Yellow Castle)
- Short name: Ahed
- Founded: 1964; 62 years ago (as Al Ahed Al Jadeed); 1985; 41 years ago (as Nejmet Al Ahed Al Jadeed)
- Ground: Al Ahed Stadium
- Capacity: 2,000
- Chairman: Zein Khaife
- Manager: Jamal Al Haj
- League: Lebanese Premier League
- 2025–26: Lebanese Premier League, 4th of 12
- Website: alahedfc.com
Home colours	Away colours	Third colours

Al Ahed Football Club (Arabic: نادي العهد الرياضي, lit. 'The Covenant Sporting Club') is a football club based in Ouzai, a district in Beirut, Lebanon, that competes in the Lebanese Premier League, the top flight of Lebanese football. The club was founded in 1964 as Al Ahed Al Jadeed, initially starting in the Third Division before reaching the Premier League for the first time in 1996.

Nicknamed "the Yellow Castle" (Arabic: القلعة الصفراء), Ahed have won one AFC Cup title, nine Premier League titles, six FA Cup titles, two Federation Cup titles, eight Super Cup titles, and six Elite Cup titles. They secured their first league title in 2008 and have achieved three unbeaten seasons (in 2010, 2018 and 2022). In 2011, Ahed made history by becoming the first team in Lebanon to accomplish both a domestic treble and quadruple, winning the league, the FA Cup, the Elite Cup, and the Super Cup in the same season. In 2019, Ahed defeated North Korean side April 25 in the final of the AFC Cup, becoming the first Lebanese side to win the competition. They reached the final once more in 2024, losing to Australian side Central Coast Mariners.

The club is primarily supported by the Shia community and is affiliated with Hezbollah, a Lebanese Shia political party and militant group. Ahed's rivals include fellow Beirut clubs Nejmeh and Ansar. Their ultras group, formed in 2018, is called "Ultras Yellow Inferno". Ahed's stadium, the Al Ahed Stadium, can accommodate 2,000 spectators.

== History ==
=== Early history (1964–1989) ===
Ahed were founded in 1964 as Al Ahed Al Jadeed (Arabic: العهد الجديد, lit. 'The New Covenant') in Dahieh, a southern suburb of Beirut. Under the presidency of Muhieddine Anouti, the club initially competed in the Lebanese Third Division. During the 1970s, Ahed played in Msaytbeh, an area of Beirut, under the name Al Huda Islamic Club (Arabic: نادي الهدى الإسلامي). However, the club ceased activities as a consequence of the Israeli invasion of Lebanon in 1982.

In 1984, Anouti acquired a license under the name Nejmet Al Ahed Al Jadeed (Arabic: نجمة العهد الجديد, lit. 'The Star of the New Covenant') but did not establish a club. On 2 May 1985, the Lebanese Football Association granted membership to the club to resume playing football, with Mohammad Assi assuming the presidency. During the 1988–89 season in the Lebanese Second Division, the team qualified for a playoff match against Al-Majdi. The match ended in a 1–1 draw, preventing Ahed from securing promotion to the Lebanese Premier League.

=== Lebanese Premier League and first titles (1992–2011) ===
In 1992, Abdo Saad became the new president and changed the name of the club to Al Ahed (Arabic: العهد, lit. 'The Covenant') because its leaders wanted a name with a Quranic meaning. In 1996, Amin Sherri succeeded Saad as president after his resignation, despite Ahed reaching the Second Division promotion play-offs. On 20 December 1996, Ahed were promoted to the Premier League for the first time in their history. They won their first Premier League game on 18 October 1997, defeating Riada Wal Adab 1–0 at the Bourj Hammoud Stadium; Moussa Bedyan scored the lone goal in the 20th minute.

After two seasons in the Premier League, Ahed were relegated to the Second Division, before they earned promotion back to the Premier League. Following the club's second promotion to the Premier League, Sherri resigned as club president and was replaced by Osama Al-Halabawi. Under Al-Halabawi's tenure, Ahed reached the finals of the 2001–02 FA Cup and the 2002 Elite Cup, in addition to securing third place in the league during the 2002–03 season. Between 2004 and 2005, Ahed won two FA Cups, one Federation Cup, and one Super Cup.

Having won the 2004 FA Cup, Ahed first qualified for an Asian Football Confederation (AFC) competition, the 2005 AFC Cup. They made their continental debut on 9 May 2009, defeating Indian club Dempo 1–0 at home. Ahed finished second in their group of three, which also included Al-Hussein of Iraq, and qualified for the quarter-finals. Despite a 1–0 home victory against Hong Kong club Sun Hei in the first leg, Ahed lost the second leg 3–1 and were eliminated.

Ahed won their first league title in 2007–08. They went on a 44-match unbeaten streak in the Premier League from 2 November 2008 to 30 October 2010, winning the 2009–10 league without defeats as a consequence. In the 2010–11 season, Ahed won the league, the FA Cup, the Super Cup and the Elite Cup, becoming the first team in Lebanon to accomplish both a domestic treble and quadruple.

=== Tamim Sleiman presidency and domestic dominance (2014–2024) ===

2019 AFC Cup final starting lineup

In 2014, Tamim Sleiman was appointed president of the club by unanimous decision. In his first year as president, Ahed secured the 2014–15 Premier League, the club's fourth in total. Their 2016–17 league victory marked the beginning of a historic streak for Ahed, as they went on to win the league in 2017–18 (their second unbeaten) and 2018–19, securing their seventh title overall and establishing themselves as three-time defending champions, a position previously held only by Ansar in 1992.

Ahed reached the final of the AFC Cup – the AFC's second-tier club competition – for the first time in 2019, joining Nejmeh in 2005 and Safa in 2008 as the only Lebanese teams to do so. On 4 November 2019, Ahed beat North Korean side 25 April with a 1–0 win in the final, from a header by Issah Yakubu, thus becoming the first Lebanese team to win the competition. Throughout the tournament, Ahed conceded only three goals in 11 matches and achieved nine clean sheets, including five consecutive ones in all five knockout matches, as they maintained an unbeaten record.

In the 2021–22 season, Ahed cleaimed their third league title unbeaten, securing their eighth title overall. They continued their dominance by winning their ninth league title in 2022–23. The match between Ahed and Racing Beirut on 6 August 2023, the first matchday of the 2023–24 league season, marked the inaugural use of video assistant referee (VAR) technology in Lebanese football. On 5 May 2024, Ahed made it to the final of the 2023–24 AFC Cup for the second time, finishing runners-up after losing 1–0 to Australian side Central Coast Mariners. The game marked the conclusion of the AFC Cup, following changes made to the AFC's competition system.

=== Recent years (2024–present) ===
Following Tamim Sleiman's 10-year presidency term at Ahed, lawyer Zein Khalife was elected as Ahed's president on 5 August 2024.

== Crest and colours ==
Ahed's primary colour is yellow, a characteristic reflected in their nickname, "the Yellow Castle" (القلعة الصفراء). On 20 May 2022, Ahed unveiled a revamped badge, adopting a minimalist design to commemorate their 2021–22 league triumph. The new emblem features a pictogram representing the three Arabic letters composing the word "Ahed" (عهد).

Logo until 2022

Logo between 2022 and 2023

Logo since 2023

== Stadium ==
Ahed owns the Al Ahed Stadium in Beirut. Located near Rafic Hariri Airport, the venue can hold 2,000 people. The club only uses the stadium for training purposes. For their home matches in club competitions, Ahed opts to utilize various other stadiums across Lebanon, such as the Camille Chamoun Sports City Stadium and the Saida Municipal Stadium, due to their larger seating capacities.

In 2018, Benjamin Netanyahu, the Prime Minister of Israel, alleged in a speech that Hezbollah, a Lebanese Shia political party and militant group, was using the Al Ahed Stadium as a site for storing missile clusters. Gebran Bassil, the Lebanese Minister of Foreign Affairs, denied these accusations.

== Supporters ==
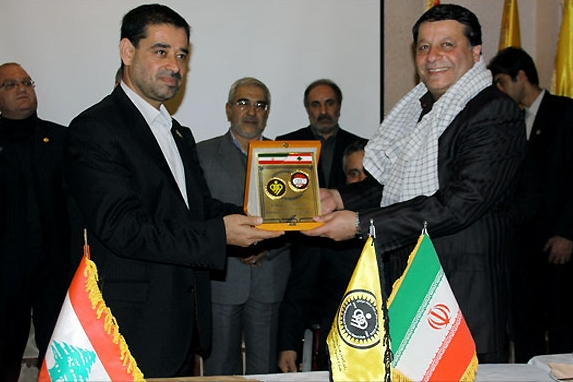
The general secretary of Ahed (left) and the president of Sepahan (right) in 2009

Ahed's fan base primarily comprises Lebanon's Shia community, and the team has strong affiliations with Hezbollah, sharing the same yellow colour. With the emergence of ultras groups in Lebanon in 2018, Ahed established "Ultras Yellow Inferno".

On 28 January 2009, Ahed initiated an informal partnership with Iranian club Sepahan, which was later formalized on 8 March 2021. This partnership involves collaborative activities such as training camps and friendly matches between the two clubs.

== Club rivalries ==
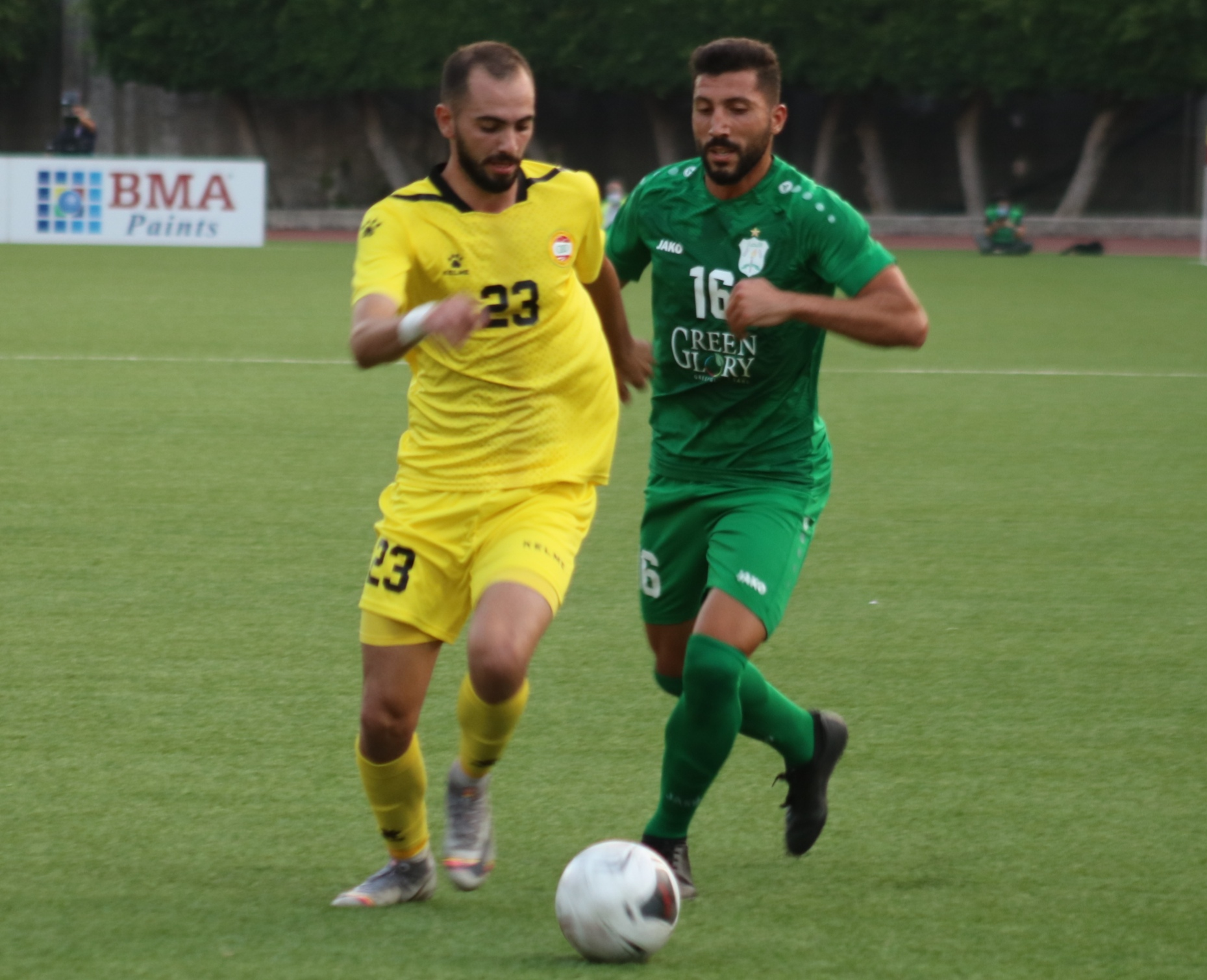
Match between Ahed (left) and Ansar (right) during the 2020–21 Lebanese Premier League

Ahed shares a rivalry with Ansar, another Beirut-based team. Ansar's affiliation with the Hariri family and their representation of a nationalist stream add depth to this rivalry. In recent years, Nejmeh, also based in Beirut, has emerged as a fierce rival for Ahed. As the most-supported team in Lebanon, Nejmeh's clashes with Ahed have escalated tensions to the extent that the Lebanese Football Association has had to change venues multiple timess.

== Kit manufacturers ==
The following is a list of kit manufacturers worn by Ahed.

Kit manufacturer	Period
(Italy) A-Line	2003–2006
(Germany) Adidas	2006–2008
(United States) Nike	2008–2009
(Italy) Lotto	2009–2014
(Spain) Joma	2014–2016
(Germany) Jako	2016–2018
(Switzerland) 14Fourteen	2018–2021
(Spain) Kelme	2021–present

== Players ==
=== Current squad ===
As of 8 November 2026

Note: Flags indicate national team as defined under FIFA eligibility rules; some limited exceptions apply. Players may hold more than one non-FIFA nationality.

No.	Pos.	Nation	Player
1	GK	LBN	Shaker Wehbe
2	DF	LBN	Mouhammed-Ali Dhaini
3	DF	ANG	Ito
4	DF	LBN	Hussein Saleh
5	DF	LBN	Ali Abboud
6	DF	LBN	Hsein Reda
7	FW	LBN	Shadi Jouni
8	DF	LBN	Hussein Dakik (captain)
9	FW	LBN	Fadel Antar
10	MF	LBN	Mahmoud Zbib
11	FW	LBN	Hussein Ezeddine
12	MF	NIG	Ousseini Badamassi
13	DF	LBN	Abdallah Moughrabi
14	FW	LBN	Mohamad Haidar
15	MF	LBN	Ali El Reda Atwi

No.	Pos.	Nation	Player
16	FW	COD	Rodrigue Kitwa
17	MF	PLE	Hamza Hussein
18	MF	LBN	Bilal Al Sabbagh
19	DF	LBN	Ali Siblini
20	FW	LBN	Mohammad Nasser
21	GK	LBN	Mohamad Bechara
22	FW	LBN	Hassan Salami
23	DF	LBN	Ali Hadid
24	GK	LBN	Mahdi Mzanar
25	DF	NIG	Yacouba Diori
26	DF	LBN	Mark Nicholas
28		LBN	Mahmoud El Zenji
70	MF	LBN	Hussein El Zein
99	FW	PLE	Mohammed Balah
—	FW	LBN	Karim Fadel

=== Players on loan ===
Note: Flags indicate national team as defined under FIFA eligibility rules; some limited exceptions apply. Players may hold more than one non-FIFA nationality.

No.	Pos.	Nation	Player
—	GK	LBN	Shareef Azaki (at Tadamon Sour until 30 June 2027)
—	GK	LBN	Toufic Nahle (at Bourj until 30 June 2027)

No.	Pos.	Nation	Player
—	MF	LBN	Adam Koubeissi (at Akhaa Ahli Aley until 30 June 2027)
—	FW	LBN	Karim Darwich (at Al-Nahda until 30 June 2027)

=== Notable players ===
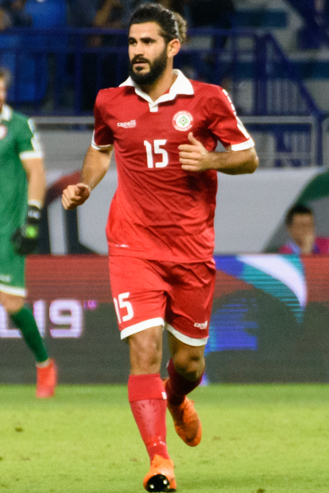
Ahed's captain Haytham Faour with Lebanon at the 2019 AFC Asian Cup

Players in international competitions
Competition	Player	National team
2019 AFC Asian Cup	Rabih Ataya	Lebanon
2019 AFC Asian Cup	Samir Ayass	Lebanon
2019 AFC Asian Cup	Haytham Faour	Lebanon
2019 AFC Asian Cup	Mohamad Haidar	Lebanon
2019 AFC Asian Cup	Mehdi Khalil	Lebanon
2019 AFC Asian Cup	Nour Mansour	Lebanon
2019 AFC Asian Cup	Ahmad Al Saleh	Syria
2023 AFC Asian Cup	Mohammad Abu Hasheesh	Jordan
2023 AFC Asian Cup	Mohamad Haidar	Lebanon
2023 AFC Asian Cup	Ali Al Haj	Lebanon
2023 AFC Asian Cup	Mehdi Khalil	Lebanon
2023 AFC Asian Cup	Khalil Khamis	Lebanon
2023 AFC Asian Cup	Nour Mansour	Lebanon
2023 AFC Asian Cup	Mostafa Matar	Lebanon
2023 AFC Asian Cup	Walid Shour	Lebanon
2023 AFC Asian Cup	Hasan Srour	Lebanon
2023 AFC Asian Cup	Hussein Zein	Lebanon
2023 AFC Asian Cup	Mohammad Al Marmour	Syria

== Coaching staff ==
Position	Staff
Sporting director	(Lebanon) Mohamad Assi
Team manager	(Lebanon) Mohamad Sherri
Head coach	(Lebanon) Jamal Al Haj
Assistant Head coach	(Lebanon) Mohammad Ibrahim
Assistant coach	(Lebanon) Ali Osseily
Fitness coach	(Lebanon) Hassan Baraket
Head of goalkeeping	(Lebanon) Mohamad Hammoud
Performance analyst	(Lebanon) Karim Srour
Physical performance analyst	(Lebanon) Hussein Baraket
Physiotherapist	(Lebanon) Melhem Chamas
Physio assistant	(Lebanon) Ali Yassine
Equipment manager	(Lebanon) Hussein Ayash
Assistant equipment manager	(Sudan) Yehya Othman
Media manager	(Lebanon) Ali Hammoud
Photographer	(Lebanon) Hassan Bahsoun

== Honours ==
=== Domestic ===
- Lebanese Premier League
  - Winners (9): 2007–08, 2009–10, 2010–11, 2014–15, 2016–17, 2017–18, 2018–19, 2021–22, 2022–23
- Lebanese FA Cup
  - Winners (6): 2003–04, 2004–05, 2008–09, 2010–11, 2017–18, 2018–19
  - Runners-up (5): 2001–02, 2006–07, 2015–16, 2022–23, 2023–24
- Lebanese Federation Cup
  - Winners (2; joint record): 2004, 2023
- Lebanese Elite Cup (defunct)
  - Winners (6): 2008, 2010, 2011, 2013, 2015, 2022
  - Runners-up (7): 2002, 2003, 2004, 2009, 2012, 2017, 2021
- Lebanese Super Cup
  - Winners (8; record): 2005, 2008, 2010, 2011, 2015, 2017, 2018, 2019
  - Runners-up (2): 2004, 2009, 2023

=== Continental ===
- AFC Cup
  - Winners (1; Lebanese record): 2019
  - Runners-up (1): 2023–24

== Performance in AFC competitions ==
Ahed first participated in an Asian competition in the 2005 AFC Cup, where they were drawn in the group stage with Indian club Dempo and Jordanian club Al-Hussein. After finishing second in the group, Ahed faced Hong Kong club Sun Hei in the quarter-finals, to whom they lost 3–2 on aggregate.

Before they won the competition, their best performance was in 2016, when they reached the semi-finals before Iraqi club Al-Quwa Al-Jawiya eliminated them 4–3 on aggregate. In 2019, Ahed defeated North Korean club April 25 to win the AFC Cup, becoming the first Lebanese side to do so. Previous finalists Nejmeh and Safa were defeated in the 2005 and the 2008 finals, respectively. They reached the AFC Cup final once more in 2024, losing 1–0 to Australian club Central Coast Mariners.

- AFC Cup: 12 appearances

2005: Quarter-finals
2006: Group stage
2009: Group stage
2010: Group stage
2011: Round of 16
2012: Group stage
2016: Semi-finals
2018: Zonal semi-finals
2019: Champions
2020: Cancelled
2021: Zonal semi-finals
2023–24: Runners-up

== See also ==
- List of football clubs in Lebanon
