= Saida Municipal Stadium =

Multi-purpose stadium in Sidon, Lebanon

- ملعب صيدا البلدي
- Martyr Rafic Hariri Stadium
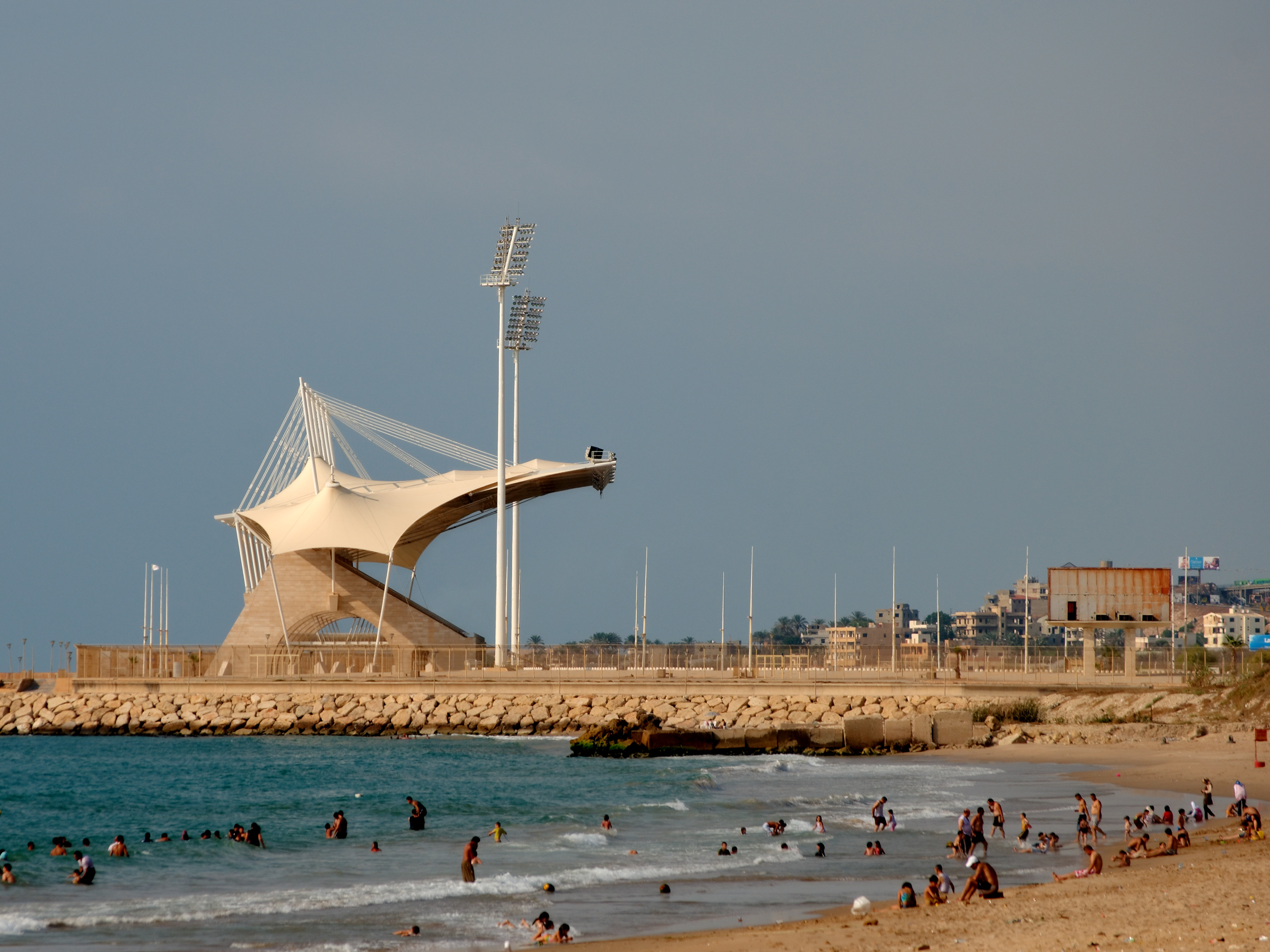
- Saida Municipal Stadium in 2009
- Interactive map of Saida Municipal Stadium
- Former names: Saida Municipal Stadium
- Location: Sidon, Lebanon
- Coordinates: 33°35′08″N 35°23′05″E
- Owner: Lebanese Government
- Operator: Lebanese Government
- Capacity: 22,600
- Surface: Grass

Construction
- Rebuilt: 1999

Tenants
- Al Ahli Saida SC; Lebanon national football team

The Saida Municipal Stadium (Arabic: ملعب صيدا البلدي), also known as the Martyr Rafic Hariri Stadium (Arabic: ملعب الرئيس الشهيد رفيق الحريري), is a 22,600 capacity multi-purpose stadium in Sidon, Lebanon.

The stadium was built in 1999 on the expanded grounds of the old stadium, as one of the venues to host matches during the 2000 AFC Asian Cup that was held in Lebanon. Due to neglect, the stadium's condition fell into dismay in the 2020s.
