= 2019 AFC Cup =

16th secondary club football tournament organized by the

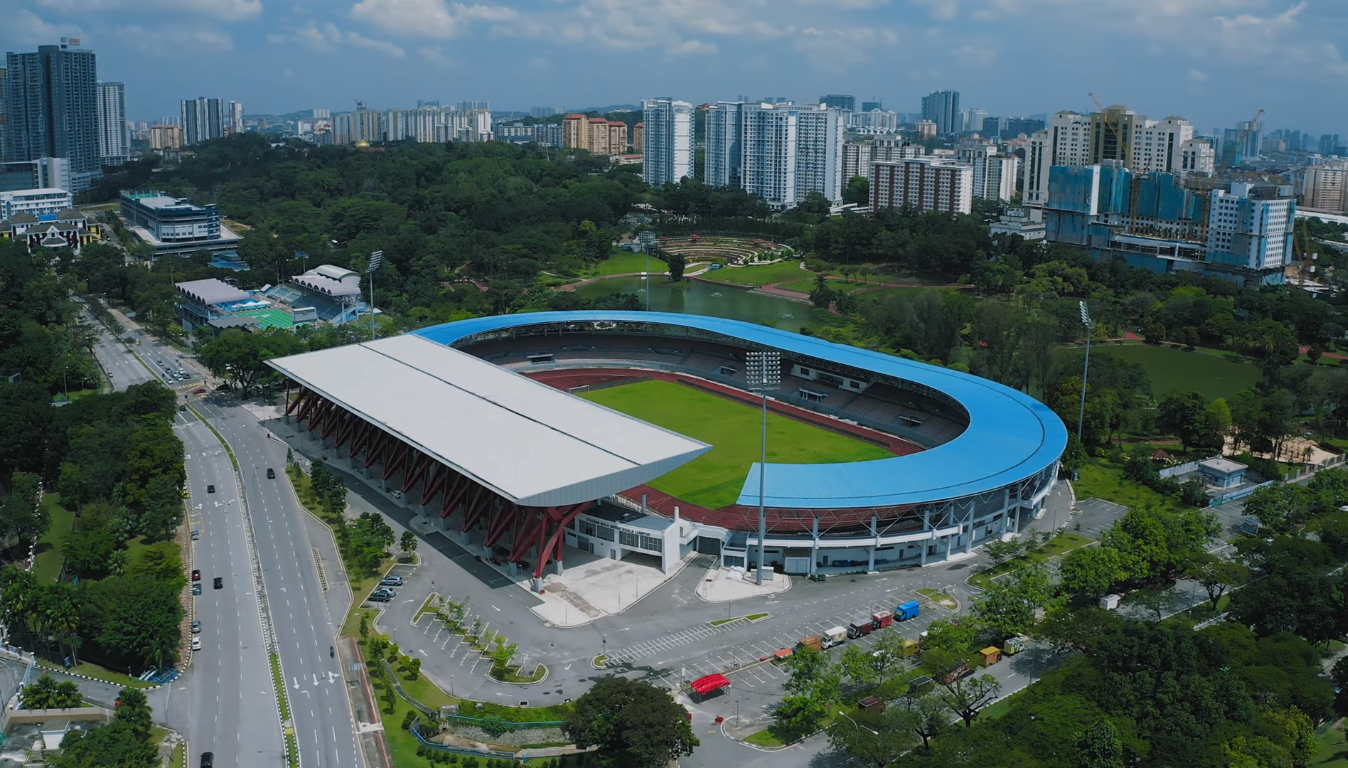
- Kuala Lumpur Stadium in Kuala Lumpur hosted the final

Tournament details
- Dates: Qualifying: 5 February – 13 March 2019; Competition proper: 25 February – 4 November 2019
- Teams: Competition proper: 36; Total: 43 (from 26 associations)

Final positions
- Champions: (Lebanon) Al-Ahed (1st title)
- Runners-up: (North Korea) April 25

Tournament statistics
- Matches played: 127
- Goals scored: 386 (3.04 per match)
- Attendance: 428,416 (3,373 per match)
- Top scorer(s): (Spain) Bienvenido Marañón (10 goals)
- Best player: (Lebanon) Mehdi Khalil
- Fair play award: (Lebanon) Al-Ahed

The 2019 AFC Cup was the 16th edition of the AFC Cup, Asia's secondary club football tournament organized by the Asian Football Confederation (AFC).

Al-Ahed from Lebanon won the title for the first time, defeating April 25 from North Korea in the final. Al-Quwa Al-Jawiya were the title holders, having won the previous three editions of the tournament. However, they were unable to defend the title as Iraqi teams played in the AFC Champions League instead of the AFC Cup in the 2019 edition.

== Association team allocation ==
The 46 AFC member associations (excluding the associate member Northern Mariana Islands) are ranked based on their national team's and clubs' performance over the last four years in AFC competitions, with the allocation of slots for the 2019 and 2020 editions of the AFC club competitions determined by the 2017 AFC rankings (Entry Manual Article 2.3):

- The associations are split into five zones:
  - West Asia Zone consists of the associations from the West Asian Football Federation (WAFF).
  - Central Asia Zone consists of the associations from Central Asian Football Association (CAFA).
  - South Asia Zone consists of the associations from the South Asian Football Federation (SAFF).
  - ASEAN Zone consists of the associations from the ASEAN Football Federation (AFF).
  - East Asia Zone consists of the associations from the East Asian Football Federation (EAFF).
- All associations which do not receive direct slots in the AFC Champions League group stage are eligible to enter the AFC Cup.
- In each zone, the number of groups in the group stage is determined based on the number of entries, with the number of slots filled through play-offs same as the number of groups:
  - In the West Asia Zone and the ASEAN Zone, there are three groups in the group stage, including a total of 9 direct slots, with the 3 remaining slots filled through play-offs.
  - In the Central Asia Zone, the South Asia Zone, and the East Asia Zone, there is one group in the group stage, including a total of 3 direct slots, with the 1 remaining slot filled through play-offs.
- The top associations participating in the AFC Cup in each zone as per the AFC rankings get at least one direct slot in the group stage (including losers of the AFC Champions League qualifying play-offs), while the remaining associations get only play-off slots:
  - For the West Asia Zone and the ASEAN zone:
    - The associations ranked 1st to 3rd each get two direct slots.
    - The associations ranked 4th to 6th each get one direct slot and one play-off slot.
    - The associations ranked 7th or below each get one play-off slot.
  - For the Central Asia Zone, the South Asia Zone, and the East Asia zone:
    - The associations ranked 1st to 3rd each get one direct slot and one play-off slot.
    - The associations ranked 4th or below each get one play-off slot.
- The maximum number of slots for each association is one-third of the total number of eligible teams in the top division.
- If any association gives up its direct slots, they are redistributed to the highest eligible association, with each association limited to a maximum of two direct slots.
- If any association gives up its play-off slots, they are annulled and not redistributed to any other association.
- If the number of teams in the play-offs in any zone is fewer than twice the number of group stage slots filled through play-offs, the play-off teams of the highest eligible associations are given byes to the group stage.

=== Association ranking ===
For the 2019 AFC Cup, the associations are allocated slots according to their association ranking which was published on 15 December 2017, which takes into account their performance in the AFC Champions League and the AFC Cup, as well as their national team's FIFA World Rankings, between 2014 and 2017.

Participation for 2019 AFC Cup
Participating
Not participating

West Asia Zone
Rank		Member Association	Points	Slots		
Rank		Member Association	Points	Group stage	Play-off	
Zone	AFC	Member Association	Points	Group stage	Play-off round	Prelim. round
1	16	Syria	28.983	2	0	0
2	18	Jordan	25.649	2	0	0
3	19	Kuwait	24.798	2	0	0
4	20	Bahrain	24.337	2	0	0
5	22	Lebanon	21.367	2	0	0
6	27	Oman	13.921	1	1	0
7	29	Palestine	10.552	0	1	0
—	34	Yemen	3.358	0	0	0
Total				11	2	0
Total				11	2	
Total				13		

Central Asia Zone
Rank		Member Association	Points	Slots		
Rank		Member Association	Points	Group stage	Play-off	
Zone	AFC	Member Association	Points	Group stage	Play-off round	Prelim. round
1	12	Tajikistan	30.725	1	1	0
2	26	Turkmenistan	14.163	1	0	1
3	31	Kyrgyzstan	5.680	1	0	1
—	37	Afghanistan	2.454	0	0	0
Total				3	1	2
Total				3	3	
Total				6		

South Asia Zone
Rank		Member Association	Points	Slots		
Rank		Member Association	Points	Group stage	Play-off	
Zone	AFC	Member Association	Points	Group stage	Play-off round	Prelim. round
1	15	India	29.291	1	1	0
—	28	Maldives	11.970	0	0	0
2	33	Bangladesh	3.365	1	0	0
3	38	Nepal	1.228	1	0	0
4	39	Bhutan	0.875	0	0	1
5	44	Sri Lanka	0.325	0	0	1
—	46	Pakistan	0.188	0	0	0
Total				3	1	2
Total				3	3	
Total				6		

ASEAN Zone
Rank		Member Association	Points	Slots		
Rank		Member Association	Points	Group stage	Play-off	
Zone	AFC	Member Association	Points	Group stage	Play-off round	Prelim. round
1	17	Vietnam	27.426	2	0	0
2	21	Philippines	21.405	2	0	0
3	23	Singapore	17.084	2	0	0
4	24	Indonesia	16.871	2	0	0
5	25	Myanmar	14.753	2	0	0
6	32	Laos	3.439	1	0	0
7	35	Cambodia	3.312	1	0	0
—	41	Brunei	0.564	0	0	0
—	43	Timor-Leste	0.401	0	0	0
Total				12	0	0
Total				12	0	
Total				12		

East Asia Zone
Rank		Member Association	Points	Slots		
Rank		Member Association	Points	Group stage	Play-off	
Zone	AFC	Member Association	Points	Group stage	Play-off round	Prelim. round
1	14	Hong Kong	29.300	1	1	0
2	30	North Korea	7.797	1	0	1
3	36	Chinese Taipei	2.769	1	0	0
—	40	Macau	0.815	0	0	0
—	42	Guam	0.539	0	0	0
4	45	Mongolia	0.213	0	0	1
Total				3	1	2
Total				3	3	
Total				6		

Notes

1. Afghanistan (AFG): Afghanistan did not implement the AFC Cup club licensing system.
2. Bangladesh (BAN): The 2018–19 Bangladesh Premier League was not completed in time for the 2019 AFC Cup, so Bangladesh could only get one total slot, where they were represented by the 2018 Bangladesh Federation Cup winners.
3. Brunei (BRU): Brunei did not implement the AFC Cup club licensing system.
4. Chinese Taipei (TPE): Chinese Taipei had only one team which had an AFC Cup license.
5. Guam (GUM): Guam did not implement the AFC Cup club licensing system.
6. Laos (LAO): Laos had only one team which had an AFC Cup license and finished in the top half of the league to meet the sporting criteria (Entry Manual 12.6).
7. Macau (MAC): Macau did not have any teams which had an AFC Cup license.
8. Maldives (MDV): Maldives did not submit the list of licensed teams to the AFC.
9. Pakistan (PAK): Pakistan did not implement the AFC Cup club licensing system.
10. Timor-Leste (TLS): Timor-Leste did not submit the list of licensed teams to the AFC.
11. Yemen (YEM): Yemen did not implement the AFC Cup club licensing system.

== Teams ==
The following 43 teams from 26 associations entered the competition.

West Asia ZoneGroup stage direct entrants (Groups A–C)
Team	Qualifying method	App (Last)
(Syria) Al-Jaish	2017–18 Syrian Premier League champions and 2018 Syrian Cup winners	9th (2018)
(Syria) Al-Ittihad	2017–18 Syrian Premier League runners-up	4th (2012)
(Jordan) Al-Wehdat	2017–18 Jordanian Pro League champions	11th (2017)
(Jordan) Al-Jazeera	2017–18 Jordan FA Cup winners 2017–18 Jordanian Pro League runners-up	3rd (2018)
Al-Kuwait	2017–18 Kuwaiti Premier League champions and 2017–18 Kuwait Emir Cup winners	8th (2015)
(Kuwait) Al-Qadsia	2017–18 Kuwaiti Premier League runners-up	7th (2015)
(Bahrain) Al-Najma	2017–18 Bahraini Premier League runners-up 2017–18 Bahraini King's Cup winners	2nd (2008)
(Bahrain) Malkiya	2017–18 Bahraini Premier League 4th place	2nd (2018)
(Lebanon) Al-Ahed	2017–18 Lebanese Premier League champions and 2017–18 Lebanese FA Cup winners	9th (2018)
(Lebanon) Nejmeh	2017–18 Lebanese Premier League runners-up	9th (2017)
(Oman) Al-Suwaiq	2017–18 Oman Professional League champions	7th (2018)

Qualifying play-off participants: Entering in play-off round
Team	Qualifying method	App (Last)
(Oman) Al-Nasr	2017–18 Sultan Qaboos Cup winners	2nd (2006)
(Palestine) Hilal Al-Quds	2017–18 West Bank Premier League champions	3rd (2018)

Central Asia ZoneGroup stage direct entrants (Group D)
Team	Qualifying method	App (Last)
(Tajikistan) Istiklol	2018 Tajik League champions and 2018 Tajik Cup winners	5th (2018)
(Turkmenistan) Altyn Asyr	2018 Ýokary Liga champions	5th (2018)
(Kyrgyzstan) Dordoi	2018 Kyrgyzstan League champions and 2018 Kyrgyzstan Cup winners	4th (2018)

Qualifying play-off participants: Entering in play-off round
Team	Qualifying method	App (Last)
(Tajikistan) Khujand	2018 Tajik League runners-up	3rd (2018)

Qualifying play-off participants: Entering in preliminary round
Team	Qualifying method	App (Last)
(Turkmenistan) Ahal	2018 Ýokary Liga runners-up	3rd (2018)
(Kyrgyzstan) Alay	2018 Kyrgyzstan League runners-up	5th (2018)

South Asia ZoneGroup stage direct entrants (Group E)
Team	Qualifying method	App (Last)
(India) Minerva Punjab	2017–18 I-League champions	1st
(Bangladesh) Abahani Limited Dhaka	2018 Bangladesh Federation Cup winners	3rd (2018)
(Nepal) Manang Marshyangdi Club	2018–19 Martyr's Memorial A-Division League champions	1st

Qualifying play-off participants: Entering in play-off round
Team	Qualifying method	App (Last)
(India) Chennaiyin	2017–18 Indian Super League champions	1st

Qualifying play-off participants: Entering in preliminary round
Team	Qualifying method	App (Last)
(Bhutan) Transport United	2018 Bhutan National League champions	2nd (2018)
(Sri Lanka) Colombo	2017–18 Sri Lanka Champions League champions	2nd (2017)

ASEAN ZoneGroup stage direct entrants (Groups F–H)
Team	Qualifying method	App (Last)
(Vietnam) Hà Nội	2018 V.League 1 champions	4th (2017)
(Vietnam) Becamex Bình Dương	2018 Vietnamese Cup winners	3rd (2010)
(Philippines) Ceres–Negros	2018 Philippines Football League champions	5th (2018)
(Philippines) Kaya–Iloilo	2018 Copa Paulino Alcantara winners	2nd (2016)
(Singapore) Home United	2018 Singapore Premier League runners-up	10th (2018)
(Singapore) Tampines Rovers	2018 Singapore Premier League 4th place	11th (2018)
(Indonesia) Persija Jakarta	2018 Liga 1 champions	2nd (2018)
(Indonesia) PSM Makassar	2018 Liga 1 runners-up	1st
(Myanmar) Yangon United	2018 Myanmar National League champions and 2018 General Aung San Shield winners	6th (2018)
(Myanmar) Shan United	2018 Myanmar National League runners-up	2nd (2018)
(Laos) Lao Toyota	2018 Lao Premier League champions	5th (2018)
(Cambodia) Nagaworld	2018 Cambodian League champions	2nd (2017)

East Asia ZoneGroup stage direct entrants (Group I)
Team	Qualifying method	App (Last)
(Hong Kong) Kitchee	2017–18 Hong Kong Premier League champions and 2017–18 Hong Kong FA Cup winners	7th (2016)
(North Korea) April 25	2017–18 DPR Korea Premier League champions	3rd (2018)
(Chinese Taipei) Hang Yuen	2018 Taiwan Football Premier League 3rd place	2nd (2018)

Qualifying play-off participants: Entering in play-off round
Team	Qualifying method	App (Last)
(Hong Kong) Tai Po	2017–18 Hong Kong Premier League runners-up	2nd (2010)

Qualifying play-off participants: Entering in preliminary round
Team	Qualifying method	App (Last)
(North Korea) Ryomyong	2018 Hwaebul Cup winners	1st
(Mongolia) Erchim	2018 Mongolian Premier League champions	3rd (2018)

Notes

1. AFC Champions League (ACL): Teams played in the AFC Champions League qualifying play-offs, but failed to advance to the AFC Champions League group stage. Had they advanced to the AFC Champions League group stage, they would not play in the AFC Cup, and would be replaced by the standby team from the same association if such team were available.
2. Bahrain (BAH): Al-Muharraq, the 2017–18 Bahraini Premier League champions, did not have an AFC Cup license. As a result, Malkiya, the league 4th place, entered the group stage.
3. Chinese Taipei (TPE): Tatung and Taipower, the 2018 Taiwan Premier League champions and runners-up, did not have an AFC Cup license. As a result, Hang Yuen, the league 3rd place, entered the group stage.
4. Singapore (SIN): Albirex Niigata Singapore, the 2018 Singapore Premier League champions and 2018 Singapore Cup winners, is a satellite team of Japanese club Albirex Niigata and thus ineligible to represent Singapore in AFC club competitions. Moreover, DPMM, the 2018 Singapore Premier League 3rd place, is a team from Brunei and thus ineligible to represent Singapore in AFC club competitions. As a result, Home United and Tampines Rovers, the league runners-up and 4th place respectively, entered the group stage.
5. Turkmenistan (TKM): Köpetdag, the 2018 Turkmenistan Cup winners, did not have an AFC Cup license. As a result, Ahal, the 2018 Ýokary Liga runners-up, entered the qualifying play-offs.
Location of teams of the 2019 AFC Cup.
West Asia Zone
Central Asia Zone
South Asia Zone
ASEAN Zone
East Asia Zone
(p) Qualifying play-off participants

== Schedule ==
The schedule of the competition is as follows (W: West Asia Zone; C: Central Asia Zone; S: South Asia Zone; A: ASEAN Zone; E: East Asia Zone).

Stage	Round	Draw date	First leg	Second leg
Preliminary stage	Preliminary round	No draw	20 February 2019 (C, S, E)	27 February 2019 (C, S, E)
Play-off stage	Play-off round	No draw	5 February 2019 (W), 6 March 2019 (C, S, E)	12 February 2019 (W), 13 March 2019 (C, S, E)
Group stage	Matchday 1	22 November 2018	25–27 February 2019 (W, A), 3 April 2019 (C, S, E)	
Group stage	Matchday 2	22 November 2018	11–13 March 2019 (W, A), 17 April 2019 (C, S, E)	
Group stage	Matchday 3	22 November 2018	1–3 April & 3 May 2019 (W, A), 30 April – 1 May 2019 (C, S, E)	
Group stage	Matchday 4	22 November 2018	15–17 & 23 April & 6 May 2019 (W, A), 15 May 2019 (C, S, E)	
Group stage	Matchday 5	22 November 2018	29 April – 1 May 2019 (W, A), 19 June 2019 (C, S, E)	
Group stage	Matchday 6	22 November 2018	13–15 May 2019 (W, A), 26 June 2019 (C, S, E)	
Knockout stage	Zonal semi-finals	22 November 2018	17–19 June 2019 (W, A)	24–26 June 2019 (W, A)
Knockout stage	Zonal finals	2 July 2019	31 July 2019 (A), 24 September 2019 (W)	7 August 2019 (A), 1 October 2019 (W)
Knockout stage	Inter-zone play-off semi-finals	2 July 2019	20–21 August 2019	27–28 August 2019
Knockout stage	Inter-zone play-off final	2 July 2019	25 September 2019	2 October 2019
Knockout stage	Final	2 July 2019	2 November 2019 at Kuala Lumpur Stadium, Kuala Lumpur	

== Qualifying play-offs ==
In the qualifying play-offs, each tie was played on a home-and-away two-legged basis. The away goals rule, extra time (away goals do not apply in extra time) and penalty shoot-out were used to decide the winner if necessary (Regulations Article 9.3). The four winners of the play-off round (one each from West Asia Zone, Central Asia Zone, South Asia Zone, East Asia Zone) advanced to the group stage to join the 32 direct entrants. The bracket of the qualifying play-offs for each zone, determined based on the association ranking of each team, with the team from the higher-ranked association hosting the second leg, was officially announced by the AFC prior to the group stage draw on 22 November 2018.

=== Preliminary round ===
Central Asia Zone
Team 1	Agg.	Team 2	1st leg	2nd leg
Alay (Kyrgyzstan)	1–3	(Turkmenistan) Ahal	1–2	0–1

South Asia Zone
Team 1	Agg.	Team 2	1st leg	2nd leg
Colombo (Sri Lanka)	9–2	(Bhutan) Transport United	7–1	2–1

East Asia Zone
Team 1	Agg.	Team 2	1st leg	2nd leg
Erchim (Mongolia)	0–6	(North Korea) Ryomyong	0–3	0–3

=== Play-off round ===
West Asia Zone
Team 1	Agg.	Team 2	1st leg	2nd leg
Hilal Al-Quds (Palestine)	3–1	(Oman) Al-Nasr	2–1	1–0

Central Asia Zone
Team 1	Agg.	Team 2	1st leg	2nd leg
Ahal (Turkmenistan)	1–1 (a)	(Tajikistan) Khujand	1–1	0–0

South Asia Zone
Team 1	Agg.	Team 2	1st leg	2nd leg
Colombo (Sri Lanka)	0–1	(India) Chennaiyin	0–0	0–1

East Asia Zone
Team 1	Agg.	Team 2	1st leg	2nd leg
Ryomyong (North Korea)	0–0 (3–5 p)	(Hong Kong) Tai Po	0–0	0–0 (a.e.t.)

== Group stage ==
The draw for the group stage was held on 22 November 2018, 14:00 MYT (UTC+8), at the AFC House in Kuala Lumpur, Malaysia. The 36 teams were drawn into nine groups of four: three groups each in the West Asia Zone (Groups A–C) and the ASEAN Zone (Groups F–H), and one group each in the Central Asia Zone (Group D), the South Asia Zone (Group E), and the East Asia Zone (Group I). Teams from the same association in the West Asia Zone and ASEAN Zone cannot be drawn into the same group. In the group stage, each group was played on a home-and-away round-robin basis. The following teams advanced to the knockout stage:

- The winners of each group and the best runners-up in the West Asia Zone and the ASEAN Zone advanced to the Zonal semi-finals.
- The winners of each group in the Central Asia Zone, the South Asia Zone, and the East Asia Zone advanced to the Inter-zone play-off semi-finals.

Tiebreakers

The teams were ranked according to points (3 points for a win, 1 point for a draw, 0 points for a loss). If tied on points, tiebreakers were applied in the following order (Regulations Article 10.5):

1. Points in head-to-head matches among tied teams;
2. Goal difference in head-to-head matches among tied teams;
3. Goals scored in head-to-head matches among tied teams;
4. Away goals scored in head-to-head matches among tied teams;
5. If more than two teams were tied, and after applying all head-to-head criteria above, a subset of teams were still tied, all head-to-head criteria above were reapplied exclusively to this subset of teams;
6. Goal difference in all group matches;
7. Goals scored in all group matches;
8. Penalty shoot-out if only two teams playing each other in the last round of the group were tied;
9. Disciplinary points (yellow card = 1 point, red card as a result of two yellow cards = 3 points, direct red card = 3 points, yellow card followed by direct red card = 4 points);
10. Association ranking.

=== Group A ===
Pos	Team	Pld	W	D	L	GF	GA	GD	Pts	Qualification	WEH	JAI	HAQ	NEJ
1	(Jordan) Al-Wehdat	6	4	1	1	12	4	+8	13	Zonal semi-finals	—	1–1	2–0	1–0
2	(Syria) Al-Jaish	6	2	4	0	6	4	+2	10	Zonal semi-finals	1–0	—	1–1	2–2
3	(Palestine) Hilal Al-Quds	6	2	2	2	7	11	−4	8		2–6	0–0	—	2–1
4	(Lebanon) Nejmeh	6	0	1	5	4	10	−6	1		0–2	0–1	1–2	—

Source: AFC

=== Group B ===
Pos	Team	Pld	W	D	L	GF	GA	GD	Pts	Qualification	JAZ	KUW	NAJ	ITH
1	(Jordan) Al-Jazeera	6	5	1	0	13	2	+11	16	Zonal semi-finals	—	1–0	3–0	4–0
2	Al-Kuwait	6	3	1	2	6	4	+2	10		1–2	—	2–1	0–0
3	(Bahrain) Al-Najma	6	2	1	3	6	9	−3	7		1–1	0–1	—	2–1
4	(Syria) Al-Ittihad	6	0	1	5	2	12	−10	1		0–2	0–2	1–2	—

Source: AFC

=== Group C ===
Pos	Team	Pld	W	D	L	GF	GA	GD	Pts	Qualification	AHE	MAL	QAD	SUW
1	(Lebanon) Al-Ahed	6	4	2	0	8	3	+5	14	Zonal semi-finals	—	2–1	0–0	4–2
2	(Bahrain) Malkiya	6	2	2	2	8	8	0	8		0–0	—	1–2	2–2
3	(Kuwait) Al-Qadsia	6	2	1	3	6	6	0	7		0–1	1–2	—	2–0
4	(Oman) Al-Suwaiq	6	1	1	4	7	12	−5	4		0–1	1–2	2–1	—

Source: AFC

=== Group D ===
Pos	Team	Pld	W	D	L	GF	GA	GD	Pts	Qualification	ALT	IST	DOR	KHU
1	(Turkmenistan) Altyn Asyr	6	2	4	0	7	4	+3	10	Inter-zone play-off semi-finals	—	1–1	3–1	1–0
2	(Tajikistan) Istiklol	6	2	2	2	12	8	+4	8		1–1	—	4–1	3–0
3	(Kyrgyzstan) Dordoi	6	2	1	3	9	12	−3	7 (Note: Head-to-head results: Khujand 3–1 Dordoi, Dordoi 3–0 Khujand.)		1–1	2–1	—	3–0
4	(Tajikistan) Khujand	6	2	1	3	6	10	−4	7		0–0	3–2	3–1	—

Source: AFC

=== Group E ===
Pos	Team	Pld	W	D	L	GF	GA	GD	Pts	Qualification	ABD	CFC	MIN	MMC
1	(Bangladesh) Abahani Limited Dhaka	6	4	1	1	12	5	+7	13	Inter-zone play-off semi-finals	—	3–2	2–2	5–0
2	(India) Chennaiyin	6	3	2	1	9	6	+3	11		1–0	—	0–0	2–0
3	(India) Minerva Punjab	6	0	5	1	6	7	−1	5		0–1	1–1	—	2–2
4	(Nepal) Manang Marshyangdi Club	6	0	2	4	5	14	−9	2		0–1	2–3	1–1	—

Source: AFC

=== Group F ===
Pos	Team	Pld	W	D	L	GF	GA	GD	Pts	Qualification	HAN	TAM	YAN	NAG
1	(Vietnam) Hà Nội	6	4	1	1	23	5	+18	13 (Note: Head-to-head results: Tampines Rovers 1–1 Hà Nội, Hà Nội 2–0 Tampines Rovers.)	Zonal semi-finals	—	2–0	0–1	10–0
2	(Singapore) Tampines Rovers	6	4	1	1	17	10	+7	13		1–1	—	4–3	4–2
3	(Myanmar) Yangon United	6	2	0	4	10	14	−4	6		2–5	1–3	—	2–0
4	(Cambodia) Nagaworld	6	1	0	5	6	27	−21	3		1–5	1–5	2–1	—

Source: AFC

=== Group G ===
Pos	Team	Pld	W	D	L	GF	GA	GD	Pts	Qualification	CER	BBD	PSJ	SHA
1	(Philippines) Ceres–Negros	6	5	0	1	15	6	+9	15	Zonal semi-finals	—	0–1	1–0	3–2
2	(Vietnam) Becamex Bình Dương	6	4	1	1	13	5	+8	13	Zonal semi-finals	1–3	—	3–1	6–0
3	(Indonesia) Persija Jakarta	6	2	1	3	12	9	+3	7		2–3	0–0	—	6–1
4	(Myanmar) Shan United	6	0	0	6	5	25	−20	0		0–5	1–2	1–3	—

Source: AFC

=== Group H ===
Pos	Team	Pld	W	D	L	GF	GA	GD	Pts	Qualification	PSM	HOM	KAY	LAO
1	(Indonesia) PSM Makassar	6	4	2	0	17	8	+9	14	Zonal semi-finals	—	3–2	1–1	7–3
2	(Singapore) Home United	6	3	1	2	9	11	−2	10		1–1	—	2–0	1–0
3	(Philippines) Kaya–Iloilo	6	2	2	2	13	7	+6	8		1–2	5–0	—	5–1
4	(Laos) Lao Toyota	6	0	1	5	7	20	−13	1		0–3	2–3	1–1	—

Source: AFC

=== Group I ===
Pos	Team	Pld	W	D	L	GF	GA	GD	Pts	Qualification	APR	KIT	TAI	HYU
1	(North Korea) April 25	6	5	0	1	17	2	+15	15	Inter-zone play-off semi-finals	—	2–0	4–0	5–0
2	(Hong Kong) Kitchee	6	3	1	2	11	10	+1	10		1–0	—	2–4	3–0
3	(Hong Kong) Tai Po	6	2	2	2	13	15	−2	8		1–3	3–3	—	4–2
4	(Chinese Taipei) Hang Yuen	6	0	1	5	4	18	−14	1		0–3	1–2	1–1	—

Source: AFC

=== Ranking of second-placed teams ===
==== West Asia Zone ====
Pos	Grp	Team	Pld	W	D	L	GF	GA	GD	Pts	Qualification
1	A	(Syria) Al-Jaish	6	2	4	0	6	4	+2	10 (Note: Disciplinary points: Al-Jaish −6, Al-Kuwait −11.)	Zonal semi-finals
2	B	Al-Kuwait	6	3	1	2	6	4	+2	10	
3	C	(Bahrain) Malkiya	6	2	2	2	8	8	0	8	

Source: AFC

==== ASEAN Zone ====
Pos	Grp	Team	Pld	W	D	L	GF	GA	GD	Pts	Qualification
1	G	(Vietnam) Becamex Bình Dương	6	4	1	1	13	5	+8	13	Zonal semi-finals
2	F	(Singapore) Tampines Rovers	6	4	1	1	17	10	+7	13	
3	H	(Singapore) Home United	6	3	1	2	9	11	−2	10	

Source: AFC

== Knockout stage ==
In the knockout stage, the 11 teams played a single-elimination tournament. Each tie was played on a home-and-away two-legged basis, except the final which was played as a single match. The away goals rule (for two-legged ties), extra time (away goals do not apply in extra time) and penalty shoot-out were used to decide the winners if necessary (Regulations Article 11.3).

=== Bracket ===
The bracket was decided after the draw for the Zonal finals and the Inter-zone play-off semi-finals, which was held on 2 July 2019, 15:00 MYT (UTC+8), at the AFC House in Kuala Lumpur, Malaysia.

Zonal semi-finals
(Vietnam) Becamex Bình Dương (a)	1	1	2
(Indonesia) PSM Makassar	0	2	2
(Philippines) Ceres–Negros	1	1	2
(Vietnam) Hà Nội	1	2	3
(Syria) Al-Jaish	3	0	3
(Jordan) Al-Jazeera	0	4	4
(Jordan) Al-Wehdat	0	0	0
(Lebanon) Al-Ahed	1	0	1

Zonal finals
(Vietnam) Becamex Bình Dương	0	0	0
(Vietnam) Hà Nội	1	1	2
(Jordan) Al-Jazeera	0	0	0
(Lebanon) Al-Ahed	0	1	1

Interzone play-off semi-finals
(Vietnam) Hà Nội	3	2	5
(Turkmenistan) Altyn Asyr	2	2	4
(Bangladesh) Abahani Limited Dhaka	4	0	4
(North Korea) April 25	3	2	5

Interzone play-off final
(Vietnam) Hà Nội	2	0	2
(North Korea) April 25 (a)	2	0	2

Final
(North Korea) April 25	0
(Lebanon) Al-Ahed	1

=== Zonal semi-finals ===
In the Zonal semi-finals, the four qualified teams from the West Asia Zone (Groups A–C) played in two ties, and the four qualified teams from the ASEAN Zone (Groups F–H) played in two ties, with the matchups and order of legs determined by the group stage draw and the identity of the best runners-up.

West Asia Zone
Team 1	Agg.	Team 2	1st leg	2nd leg
Al-Wehdat (Jordan)	0–1	(Lebanon) Al-Ahed	0–1	0–0
Al-Jaish (Syria)	3–4	(Jordan) Al-Jazeera	3–0	0–4

ASEAN Zone
Team 1	Agg.	Team 2	1st leg	2nd leg
Ceres–Negros (Philippines)	2–3	(Vietnam) Hà Nội	1–1	1–2
Becamex Bình Dương (Vietnam)	2–2 (a)	(Indonesia) PSM Makassar	1–0	1–2

=== Zonal finals ===
The draw for the Zonal finals was held on 2 July 2019. In the Zonal finals, the two winners of West Asia Zonal semi-finals play each other, and the two winners of ASEAN Zonal semi-finals play each other, with the order of legs decided by draw. The winners of the West Asia Zonal final advanced to the final, while the winners of the ASEAN Zonal final advanced to the Inter-zone play-off semi-finals.

West Asia Zone
Team 1	Agg.	Team 2	1st leg	2nd leg
Al-Jazeera (Jordan)	0–1	(Lebanon) Al-Ahed	0–0	0–1

ASEAN Zone
Team 1	Agg.	Team 2	1st leg	2nd leg
Becamex Bình Dương (Vietnam)	0–2	(Vietnam) Hà Nội	0–1	0–1

=== Inter-zone play-off semi-finals ===
The draw for the Inter-zone play-off semi-finals was held on 2 July 2019. In the Inter-zone play-off semi-finals, the four zonal winners other than the West Asia Zone play in two ties, i.e., the winners of the Central Asia Zone (Group D), the winners of the South Asia Zone (Group E), the winners of the East Asia Zone (Group I), and the winners of the ASEAN Zonal final (whose identity was not known at the time of the draw), with the matchups and order of legs decided by draw, without any seeding.

Team 1	Agg.	Team 2	1st leg	2nd leg
Hà Nội (Vietnam)	5–4	(Turkmenistan) Altyn Asyr	3–2	2–2
Abahani Limited Dhaka (Bangladesh)	4–5	(North Korea) April 25	4–3	0–2

=== Inter-zone play-off final ===
In the Inter-zone play-off final, the two winners of the Inter-zone play-off semi-finals play each other, with the order of legs determined by the Inter-zone play-off semi-final draw. The winners of the Inter-zone play-off final advance to the final.

Team 1	Agg.	Team 2	1st leg	2nd leg
Hà Nội (Vietnam)	2–2 (a)	(North Korea) April 25	2–2	0–0

=== Final ===
In the final, the winners of the West Asia Zonal final and the winners of the Inter-zone play-off final played each other, with the host team (winners of the Inter-zone play-off final) alternated from the previous season's final.

The match was originally to be hosted by April 25 at the Kim Il-sung Stadium in Pyongyang, North Korea on 2 November 2019. However, on 22 October 2019, due to North Korea's decision to ban television transmission of football games, the AFC announced that the final would be held in Shanghai, China in order for the match to be transmitted. On 25 October 2019, the match was rescheduled from 2 November to 4 November and the host city was shifted from Shanghai to Kuala Lumpur, Malaysia.

4 November 2019
21:00 UTC+8

April 25 (North Korea)	0–1	(Lebanon) Al-Ahed
	Live Report; Stats Report	Yakubu 74'

Kuala Lumpur Stadium, Kuala Lumpur
Attendance: 500
Referee: Hettikamkanamge Perera (Sri Lanka)

== Awards ==
Award	Player	Team
Most Valuable Player	(Lebanon) Mehdi Khalil	(Lebanon) Al-Ahed
Top Goalscorer	(Spain) Bienvenido Marañón	(Philippines) Ceres–Negros
Fair Play Award	—	(Lebanon) Al-Ahed

== Top scorers ==
Team eliminated / inactive for this round.
Player is not in the team but team still active for this round.

Rank	Player	Team	MD1	MD2	MD3	MD4	MD5	MD6	ZSF1	ZSF2	ZF1	ZF2	ISF1	ISF2	IF1	IF2	F	Total
1	(Spain) Bienvenido Marañón	(Philippines) Ceres–Negros	1	3	1	1	3		1									10
2	(Nigeria) Ganiyu Oseni	(Vietnam) Hà Nội	4			2	2	1										9
2	(North Korea) Kim Yu-song	(North Korea) April 25	1	1	2	2								2	1			9
4	(Senegal) Pape Omar Faye	(Vietnam) Hà Nội		1		3	1		1	1		1						8
5	(Brazil) Bruno Matos	(Indonesia) Persija Jakarta		2		1	1	3										7
5	(Vietnam) Nguyễn Văn Quyết	(Vietnam) Hà Nội	1							1	1		1	2	1			7
7	(Jordan) Baha' Faisal	(Jordan) Al-Wehdat		4			1	1										6
7	(Brazil) Fernando	(Hong Kong) Kitchee	1		1	1	2	1										6
9	(Singapore) Khairul Amri	(Singapore) Tampines Rovers	1			1	3											5
9	(Lebanon) Mohamad Kdouh	(Lebanon) Al-Ahed			3	1			1									5
9	(Brazil) Wander Luiz	(Vietnam) Becamex Bình Dương		1	1		1	1		1								5
9	(Finland) Eero Markkanen	(Indonesia) PSM Makassar	1	2	1	1												5
9	(Syria) Bassel Moustafa	(Syria) Al-Jaish		1		1		1	2									5

Note: Goals scored in the qualifying play-offs are not counted when determining top scorer (Regulations Article 64.4).

== See also ==
- 2019 AFC Champions League
