= Lebanese Elite Cup =

Lebanese football annual cup competition

- Founded: 1996; 30 years ago
- Abolished: 2023; 3 years ago
- Region: Lebanon
- Teams: 6
- Last champions: Ahed (6th title)
- Most championships: Nejmeh (12 titles)

The Lebanese Elite Cup (Arabic: كأس النخبة اللبناني) was a Lebanese football annual cup competition contested by the top six teams of the previous Lebanese Premier League season. Founded in 1996 as the Super League Cup, the first edition was played by the top five finishers of the league and the Lebanese FA Cup winners.

The most successful club in the competition is Nejmeh was 12 titles, followed by Ahed with six. The competition was suspended in 2023, alongside the Lebanese Challenge Cup, and was replaced by the Lebanese Federation Cup.

== History ==
The competition was first played in 1996 and was contested by the top five of the league and the Lebanese FA Cup winners; it was known as the Super League Cup. The following season it was known as the Super Cup and expanded to feature the top six teams of the previous season. From 1998 until 2002 it was known as the Viceroy Cup, and in 2003 it changed again to the Prime Cup, but has always been known locally as the Elite Cup, the current name of the competition. The competition was not played in 2006 and 2007, due to the 2006 Lebanon War.

In 2023, the Lebanese Federation Cup replaced the Lebanese Elite Cup and Lebanese Challenge Cup as the pre-season preparatory tournament.

== Winners and finalists ==
=== Winners by year ===
Lebanese Elite Cup finals
No.	Season	Winners	Score	Runners–up
1st	1996	Nejmeh	1–0	Ansar
2nd	1997	Ansar	2–0	Nejmeh
3rd	1998	Nejmeh	2–1	Ansar
4th	1999	Homenmen	2–1	Shabab Sahel
5th	2000	Ansar	1–0	Tadamon Sour
6th	2001	Nejmeh	4–4 (p)	Tadamon Sour
7th	2002	Nejmeh	1–1 (p)	Ahed
8th	2003	Nejmeh	2–1	Ahed
9th	2004	Nejmeh	1–1 (p)	Ahed
10th	2005	Nejmeh	3–0	Ansar
11th	2008	Ahed	3–1	Ansar
12th	2009	Safa	2–1	Ahed
13th	2010	Ahed	0–0 (p)	Ansar
14th	2011	Ahed	4–2	Safa
15th	2012	Safa	2–0 (aet)	Ahed
16th	2013	Ahed	2–0	Nejmeh
17th	2014	Nejmeh	3–1	Safa
18th	2015	Ahed	1–0 (aet)	Safa
19th	2016	Nejmeh	1–0 (aet)	Ansar
20th	2017	Nejmeh	2–2 (p)	Ahed
21st	2018	Nejmeh	1–0	Akhaa Ahli Aley
22nd	2019	Shabab Sahel	3–3 (p)	Ansar
23rd	2021	Nejmeh	3–3 (p)	Ahed
24th	2022	Ahed	2–1	Ansar

=== Results by team ===
Club	Wins	Runners-up	Total final appearances
Nejmeh	12	2	14
Ahed	6	7	13
Ansar	2	8	10
Safa	2	3	5
Shabab Sahel	1	1	2
Homenmen	1	0	1
Tadamon Sour	0	2	2
Akhaa Ahli Aley	0	1	1

== See also ==
- Lebanese Super Cup
