= 2017–18 Lebanese FA Cup =

Tournament details
- Country: Lebanon
- Dates: 6 October 2017 – 29 April 2018
- Teams: 24

Final positions
- Champions: Ahed
- Runners-up: Nejmeh

Tournament statistics
- Matches played: 23
- Goals scored: 76 (3.3 per match)

The 2017–18 Lebanese FA Cup was the 46th season of the national football competition of Lebanon. The competition started on 6 October 2017 and concluded with the final on 29 April 2018.

Defending champions Ansar lost to Nejmeh in the quarter-finals. Ahed went on to win their 5th title, qualifying for the 2019 AFC Cup group stage.

== First round ==
6 October 2017	Ahli Saida (2)	0–2	Chabab Ghazieh (2)

7 October 2017	Shabab Sahel (2)	4–1	Bourj (2)

7 October 2017	Nasser Bar Elias (2)	1–2	Shabab Majdal Anjar (2)

8 October 2017	Ahli Nabatieh (2)	3–1	Egtmaaey (2)

8 October 2017	Amal Maaraka (2)	2–0	Homenetmen (2)

8 October 2017	Mabarra (2)	2–0	Sagesse (2)

== Second round ==
10 November 2017	Ahli Nabatieh (2)	3–2	Chabab Ghazieh (2)

11 November 2017	Amal Maaraka (2)	0–4	Shabab Sahel (2)

== Round of 16 ==
15 December 2017	Ahed (1)	2–0	Mabarra (2)

15 December 2017	Tripoli (1)	4–1	Shabab Majdal Anjar (2)

15 December 2017	Al Nabi Chit (1)	3–1	Ahli Nabatieh (2)

15 December 2017	Shabab Sahel (2)	1–6	Akhaa Ahli Aley (1)

15 December 2017	Safa (1)	2–3	Tadamon Sour (1)

16 December 2017	Salam Zgharta (1)	2–2 (a.e.t.) (4–3 p)	Islah Borj Shmali (1)

16 December 2017	Ansar (1)	3–0 (a.e.t.)	Racing Beirut (1)

17 December 2017	Nejmeh (1)	2–0	Shabab Arabi (1)
	Maatouk 34'; Hussein 85'

== Quarter-finals ==
7 February 2018	Ahed (1)	1–1 (a.e.t.) (6–5 p)	Tripoli (1)

8 February 2018	Ansar (1)	0–1	Nejmeh (1)
			Maatouk (pen.)

10 February 2018	Al Nabi Chit (1)	0–2	Akhaa Ahli Aley (1)

11 February 2018	Tadamon Sour (1)	1–1 (a.e.t.) (5–4 p)	Salam Zgharta (1)

== Semi-finals ==
6 April 2018	Ahed (1)	3–2	Akhaa Ahli Aley (1)

7 April 2018	Nejmeh (1)	3–2 (a.e.t.)	Tadamon Sour (1)
	Maatouk 80' (pen.), 97'; El Zein 119'		90'; Faour 99'

== Final ==
29 April 2018

Ahed (1)	0–0 (a.e.t.)	Nejmeh (1)
Penalties
	4–1

Camille Chamoun Sports City Stadium, Beirut
Referee: Dimitris Masias (Cyprus)
