= 2006–07 Lebanese Second Division =

Lebanese Second Division
- Season: 2006–07
- Champions: Racing Beirut
- Runner up: Al-Hikma
- Promoted: Racing Beirut Al-Irshad
- Relegated: Racing Beirut Al-Tadamon Nabatieh

The 2006–07 Lebanese Second Division was the 73rd season of the Second Division league which featured 14 clubs. Two of these teams were eligible for promotion to the top league of Lebanese football, the Lebanese Premier League while two of the fourteen teams had to face relegation to the Lebanese Third Division for the 2006–07 Season.

== Overview ==
This season saw an increase in teams from last season, from 12 to 14 teams in the competition. However, two of the teams competing (Racing Jounieh FC & Al-Tadamon Nabatieh) decided to withdraw from the 2006–07 season. The Lebanese Football Federation reacted swiftly by relegating both teams to the Lebanese Third Division automatically leading to both relegation places being full even before the league had started.

At the end of the season, it was a clear victory in Group 1 with Shabbab Al-Ghazieh finishing 1st by 12 points ahead of Al-Irshad however they didn't get promotion to the Premier League. Group 2 was more of a tight-contest with the top being separated by just 3 points. However, it was the late charge of Racing Beirut in the 2nd half of the season which sent them to the top of Group B and receiving a guaranteed promotion back to the Premier League after being relegated in the previous Premier League Season.

As for the Group A Champions, Shabbab Al-Ghazieh, despite winning the Group and remaining undefeated, they were not promoted to the Premier League. This was due to grounds issues. Instead, Al Irshard received the 2nd promotion place to the Premier League for the 2007–08 Premier League Season.

== Final table ==
=== Group A ===
Pos	Team	P	W	D	L	F	A	F/A	Pts	Promotion/Relegation
1	Shabab Al-Ghazieh	7	7	0	0	18	5	13	21	
2	Al-Irshad	7	2	3	2	9	6	3	9	Promotion to Lebanese Premier League
3	Al-Islah	7	2	3	2	9	8	1	9	
4	Al-Ahli Nabatieh	7	2	2	3	9	6	3	9	
5	Riyadi Al-Abbasieh	7	2	1	5	9	18	-9	7	
6	Al-Bourj FC	7	0	3	4	3	8	-5	3	
7	Al-Tadamon Nabatieh	Withdrew¶								Relegated to Lebanese Third Division

¶: Originally deducted 12 points for not participating the Cup and then later withdrew from the competition all together just before the start of competition. They were automatically relegated by the Lebanese Football Federation once they withdrew from the league.

=== Group B ===
Pos	Team	P	W	D	L	F	A	F/A	Pts	Promotion/Relegation
1	Racing Beirut	7	3	4	0	18	7	11	13	Promotion to Lebanese Premier League
2	Al Mahabba Tripoli	7	3	2	2	9	14	-5	11	
3	Al-Mawadda Tripoli	7	2	4	1	11	8	3	10	
4	Homenetmen Beirut	7	2	2	3	10	13	-3	8	
5	Homenmen Beirut	7	1	5	1	11	9	2	5†	
6	Al Akhaa Al Ahli	7	1	1	5	5	13	-7	4	
7	Racing Jounieh FC	Withdrew‡								Relegated to Lebanese Third Division

†:Homenmen Beirut 3 points deducted as required by FIFA because of failure to pay Armenian player Ghakik Simoyan.

‡: Originally deducted 12 points for not participating the Cup and then later withdrew from the competition all together just before the start of competition. They were automatically relegated by the Lebanese Football Federation once they withdrew from the league.

== Promotion and relegation ==
=== Promotion to Football League for 2007–08 ===
- Racing Beirut
- Al Irshad

=== Relegation to Second Division for 2007–08 ===
- Al Rayyan
- Salam Zgharta

=== Relegation to Third Division for 2007–08 Season ===
- Racing Jounieh FC
- Al-Tadamon Nabatieh
