= 2009–10 Lebanese Second Division =

Lebanese Second Division
- Season: 2009–10
- Champions: Salam Sour
- Runner up: TBA
- Promoted: TBA
- Relegated: Homenetmen Beirut; Homenmen Beirut

The 2009–10 Lebanese Second Division was the 76th season of the second-highest level of Soccer in Lebanon. This season once again featured 14 Clubs just like the season before.

At the end of the season, both Homenetmen Beirut and Homenmen Beirut were relegated to Division 3.

== Teams ==
This is not the full list.

- Al-Ahli Nabatieh
- Al-Ahli Saida (Newly promoted)
- Al-Bourj FC
- Al-Irshad FC
- Al Islah Burj Shamali (Newly promoted)
- Al Khoyol FC
- Al-Mahabba Tripoli FC
- Al Rayyan Beirut
- Homenmen Beirut
- Homenetmen Beirut
- Racing Jounieh FC
- Salam Zgharta
- Tripoli SC
