= 2010–11 Lebanese Second Division =

Lebanese Second Division
- Season: 2010–11
- Champions: Tripoli
- Promoted: Tripoli; Ahli Saida
- Relegated: Nasser Bar Elias; Mahabba Tripoli
- Matches: 182
- Goals: 556 (3.05 per match)

The Lebanese Second Division (Arabic: الدوري اللبناني - الدرجة الثانية) is the second division of Lebanese football. It is controlled by the Lebanese Football Association. The top two teams qualify for the Lebanese Premier League and replace the relegated teams, while the bottom two are relegated to the Lebanese Third Division.

== League table ==
Pos	Team	Pld	W	D	L	GF	GA	GD	Pts	Promotion or relegation
1	Tripoli	26	18	5	3	58	20	+38	59	Promotion to Lebanese Premier League
2	Ahli Saida	26	17	4	5	45	17	+28	55	Promotion to Lebanese Premier League
3	Khoyol	26	16	7	3	56	27	+29	55	
4	Irshad	26	13	7	6	47	33	+14	46	
5	Shabab Tripoli	26	11	5	10	35	36	−1	38	
6	Mawadda Tripoli	26	11	3	12	49	47	+2	36	
7	Egtmaaey Tripoli	26	9	8	9	35	34	+1	35	
8	Harakat Shabab	26	9	5	12	32	37	−5	32	
9	Salam Zgharta	26	10	1	15	35	51	−16	31	
10	Nahda Barelias	26	5	11	10	29	38	−9	26	
11	Ahli Nabatieh	26	4	14	8	33	49	−16	26	
12	Sagesse	26	5	8	13	27	39	−12	23	
13	Nasser Bar Elias (Note: Had 6 points deducted)	26	6	8	12	43	52	−9	20	Relegation to Lebanese Third Division
14	Mahabba Tripoli	26	3	4	19	22	66	−44	13	Relegation to Lebanese Third Division

Source: Kooora
Rules for classification: 1) Points; 2) Head-to-head points; 3) Head-to-head goal difference; 4) Goal difference; 5) Goals scored; 6) Draw.
