= 2007–08 Lebanese Premier League =

Lebanese Premier League
- Season: 2007–08
- Champions: Al Ahed
- Runner up: Al Ansar
- Relegated: Al-Irshad; Al-Ahli Sidon
- Goals: 324
- Top goalscorer: (Lebanon) Mohammed Ghaddar (22)
- Biggest home win: Nejmeh 8–0 Al-Hikma (2008-05-27)
- Biggest away win: Al-Hikma 1–8 Nejmeh (2008-12-16)
- Highest scoring: Al-Hikma 1–8 Nejmeh (2008-12-16)

The 2007–08 Lebanese Premier League season was the 47th edition in the Lebanese Premier League.

Al-Ansar unsuccessfully defended its 2007 title with a 1-1 draw against Nejmeh. Al Ahed successfully defended its pursuit of its first title in the final defeating Tadamon Sour, 2–1.

Nejmeh Striker Mohammed Ghaddar won the top scorer award, having found the net 22 times.

The 2008 unrest in Lebanon caused the games to be postponed for one month. The league finished in June 2008 instead of May 2008 as scheduled.

== Final standings ==
Pos	Team	Pld	W	D	L	GF	GA	GD	Pts	Qualification or relegation
1	Al Ahed	22	15	4	3	41	15	+26	49	2009 AFC Cup Group Stage
2	Al-Ansar	22	14	6	2	41	16	+25	48	2008–09 Arab Champions League
3	Nejmeh	22	15	3	4	49	18	+31	48	
4	Al-Mabarrah	22	10	7	5	27	14	+13	37	2009 AFC Cup Group Stage (Lebanese Cup Winners)
5	Safa Beirut	22	10	5	7	31	29	+2	35	2009 AFC Cup Group Stage as 2008 AFC Cup runners-up
6	Al-Sahel	22	7	7	8	28	30	−2	28	
7	Tripoli SC	22	6	5	11	26	40	−14	23	
8	Tadamon Sour	22	5	6	11	25	35	−10	21	
9	Racing Beirut	22	4	8	10	23	28	−5	20	
10	Al-Hikma	22	4	8	10	20	42	−22	20	
11	Al-Irshad	22	4	4	14	24	36	−12	16	Relegation to Lebanese Second Division
12	Al-Ahli Sidon	22	3	7	12	11	43	−32	16	Relegation to Lebanese Second Division

== Relegation and promotion ==
- Relegated to 2008–09 Second Division:
  - Al-Irshad
  - Al-Ahli Sidon
- Promoted from 2007–08 Second Division:
  - Salam Zgharta (champions)
  - Shabab Al-Ghazieh

== Top scorers ==
This is a list of top scorers of the 2007–08 season. Mohammed Ghaddar is currently leading.

Rank	Name	Club	Goals
1	(Lebanon) Mohammed Ghaddar	Nejmeh	22
2	(Lebanon) Ghassan Shaweekh	Tadamon Sour	14
3	(Iraq) Salih Sadeer	Al-Ansar (Lebanon)	12
4	(Trinidad and Tobago) Errol McFarlane	Al-Mabarrah	9
5	(Egypt) Ahmad Jaradi	Shabab Al-Sahel	9
6	(Lebanon) Abbas Ahmed Atwi	Nejmeh	9
7	(Lebanon) Fadi Ghoson	Al-Ansar (Lebanon)	8
8	(Egypt) Issam Makka	Al-Irshad	7
9	(Brazil) Carniro Sandro	Al-Ahed	7
10	(Lebanon) Moustafa Al-Kasaa'	Tripoli SC	7
