= 2005–06 Lebanese Premier League =

Lebanese Premier League
- Season: 2007–08
- Champions: Al-Ansar
- Runner up: Al Ansar
- Relegated: Racing Beirut
- Top goalscorer: Ali Nasseredine (17)

The 2005–06 season of the Lebanese Premier League was the 45th season of Top-Flight League association football in Lebanon. This season featured ten clubs once more from across the nation. Three of these teams were eligible for competing in international competitions(AFC Cup for first Position and FA Cup Winners while second and third enter the Arab Champions League with a fourth spot reserved for the winner of the 2005–06 Lebanese Cup) while the bottom team at the end of the season would be relegated to make way for third teams from the 2005–06 Second Division for the expanded 12-team Football League in the 2006–07 Season.

== Final table ==
Pos	Team	Pld	W	D	L	GF	GA	GD	Pts	Qualification or relegation
1	Al-Ansar	18	15	2	1	50	14	+36	47	2007 AFC Cup Group Stage and 2006–07 Arab Champions League
2	Al-Nejmeh	18	14	2	2	46	14	+32	44	2007 AFC Cup
3	Al-Safa	18	9	5	4	21	21	0	32	
4	Al-Mabarrah	18	9	2	7	34	21	+13	29	
5	Al-Ahed	18	8	3	7	39	17	+22	27	
6	Salam Zgharta	18	5	5	8	17	30	−13	20	
7	Al-Tadamon Tyre	18	3	6	9	13	26	−13	15	
8	Tripoli SC	18	2	8	8	8	21	−13	14	
9	Al Rayyan	18	4	2	12	10	30	−20	14	
10	Racing Beirut	18	1	5	12	12	52	−40	8	Relegated to Lebanese Second Division

== Top scorers ==
Correct as of 13 May 2006.

Rank	Name	Club	Goals
1	(Lebanon) Ali Nasseredine	Nejmeh	17
2	(Lebanon) Abbas Ahmed Atwi	Nejmeh	14
3	(Lebanon) Fadi Ghosin	Al-Ansar (Lebanon)	11
=3	Esteban Gabreyel	Al-Mabarrah	11
5	(Brazil) Fabio Santos da Silva	Shabab Al-Sahel	8
6	Unknown	Unknown	7
=6	Victor Hugo	Al-Mabarrah	7
8	(Lebanon) Mohammed Ghaddar	Al-Nejmeh	6
=8	(Iraq) Hawar Mulla Mohammed	Ansar	6
10	(Iraq) Salih Sadeer	Ansar	5

== Qualification, relegation and promotion ==
=== Qualification ===
==== 2007 AFC Cup ====
- Al-Ansar
- Al-Hikma (Lebanese FA Cup 2006 runners-up)

==== Arab Champions League ====
- Al-Nejmeh (second in 2005–06 season)
- Al-Safa (third in 2005–06 season)

=== Promotion ===
==== To Football League ====
- Shabab Al-Sahel (Champions in 2005–06 season)
- Al-Hikma (second in 2005–06 season)
- Saida (third in 2005–06 season)

=== Relegation ===
==== To second division ====
- Racing Beirut (Last in 2005–06 season)
