= 2014–15 Lebanese FA Cup =

Tournament details
- Country: Lebanon
- Teams: 16

Final positions
- Champions: Tripoli SC
- Runners-up: Nejmeh SC

Tournament statistics
- Matches played: 15
- Goals scored: 44 (2.93 per match)

The 2014-15 edition of the Lebanese FA Cup is the 43rd edition to be played. It is the premier knockout tournament for football teams in Lebanon.

The winners qualify for the 2016 AFC Cup.

The qualifying rounds take place in late 2014 with the Premier League clubs joining at the Round of 16 in early 2015.

== Round of 16 ==
2 January 2015

Salam Zgharta	0–4	Shabab Al-Sahel
		Wassim Abdul-Hadi 13'; Krest Remy 71'; Moussa Al-Zaiat 75'; Ali Jawad 90'

Beirut Municipal Stadium, Beirut
Referee: Ali Saloum

2 January 2015

Shabeeba Al Mazra'ah	1–3	Al-Ahli Saida
Qasfeh Abu Qasim 47'		Ahmad Fakih 29'; Mazen Jamal 70'; Ahmad Abu Ardat 77'

Al Manara Stadium, Beirut

3 January 2015

Al Ahed	3–0	Nabi Sheet
Zreik 35'; Hussain Zain 56'; Remi Adicco 85'

Safa Stadium, Beirut

3 January 2015

Al Ansar	0–0	Safa
Penalties
Tião (penalty scored); Hamzeh Abboud (penalty scored); Paolo Matos (penalty scored); Mehanna (penalty scored); Abedi (penalty scored)	5-3	Haitham Atwi (penalty scored); Mohammad Hammoud (penalty scored); Omar Al Kurdi (penalty scored); Hasan Hazimeh (penalty missed)

Beirut Municipal Stadium, Beirut

4 January 2015

Al Nejmeh	3–1	Al Egtmaaey Tripoli
Claudio Maalouf 23'; Takaji 30'; Takaji 74'		Rabih Al Hosari 41'

Beirut Municipal Stadium, Beirut

4 January 2015

Tripoli	1–0	Tadamon Sour
Douglas 75'

Safa Stadium, Beirut

5 January 2015

Al-Akhaa Al-Ahli Aley	2–4 (a.e.t.)	Racing Beirut
Saeed Awada 75' 83'		Ahmad Hijazi 25' 60' 100'; Serge Saeed 119'

Beirut Municipal Stadium, Beirut

5 January 2015

Zamalek Beirut	2–3	Shabab Al-Ghazieh
Bilal Nasrallah 85' (o.g.); Karim Ahmad 112'		Nasrat Al Jamal 68'; Abdallah Kanoute 96' 104'

Al Manara Stadium, Beirut

== Quarter-final ==
10 January 2015
11:30 AM, GMT

Shabab Al-Sahel	2–1	Al-Ahed

Safa Stadium, Beirut
Referee: Ali Rafe

10 January 2015
11:30 AM, GMT

Nejmeh SC	1–0	Al Ahli Saida

Bourj Hammoud Stadium, Beirut
Referee: Arkan Abu Mujahed

11 January 2015
11:30 AM, GMT

Racing Beirut	0–1	Al Ansar

Al Ahed Stadium, Beirut
Referee: Mahmoud Jaber

11 January 2015
11:30 AM, GMT

Shabab Al-Ghazieh	0–1	Tripoli SC

Safa Stadium, Beirut
Referee: Ahmad Qabarlasi

== Semi-final ==
24 April 2015
14:30 AM, GMT

Al Ansar	1–3	Tripoli SC

Amin Abdelnour Stadium, Bhamdoun

25 April 2015
14:30 AM, GMT

Nejmeh SC	3–1	Shabab Al-Sahel

Saida Municipal Stadium, Saida

== Final ==
19 May 2015
14:00 AM, GMT

Tripoli SC	2–1	Nejmeh SC

Saida Municipal Stadium, Saida
