= 2008–09 Lebanese Second Division =

Lebanese Second Division
- Season: 2008–09
- Champions: TBA
- Runner up: TBA
- Promoted: TBA
- Relegated: TBA

The 2008–09 Lebanese Second Division was the 75th season of the second-highest level of Soccer in Lebanon. This season once again featured 14 Clubs just like the season before.

== Overview ==
In the 2007–08 Premier League, both Al-Irshad(finished 11th) and Al-Ahli Sidon (finished last) were relegated. They joined the Second Division along with Al-Riyadah and Al-Khoyol who were promoted to the Second Division from the Third Division in the 2007–08 season. Unlike the previous 3 seasons, no clubs pulled out before the season even started, a bonus for the league.

The 2-Group Round-Robin format was once again used in order to determine the 4 clubs to qualify for the promotion play-off group. The winner of the group would be automatically promoted to the Premier League for the 2009–10 Season. The runners-up would also be promoted to the Premier League.

== Table ==
=== Group A ===
Pos	Team	P	W	D	L	F	A	F/A	Pts	Promotion/Relegation
1	Al Islah	6	4	1	1	12	8	4	13	Qualifies for the Promotion Play-Off Group
2	Al-Ahli Nabatiyah	6	3	2	1	10	9	1	11	Qualifies for the Promotion Play-Off Group
3	Homenetmen Beirut	6	2	3	1	7	6	1	9	
4	Al-Khoyol	6	2	2	2	10	9	1	8	
5	Al-Irshad	6	1	4	1	9	8	1	7	
6	Mahabba Tripoli	6	1	3	2	8	8	0	6	
7	Al-Bourj FC	6	0	1	5	2	10	-8	1	Relegation to the Lebanese Third Division

=== Group B ===
Pos	Team	P	W	D	L	F	A	F/A	Pts	Promotion/Relegation
1	Al-Ahli Sidon	6	4	2	0	8	1	7	14	Qualifies for the Promotion Play-Off Group
2	Al-Ijtima'ih	6	4	1	1	9	4	5		Qualifies for the Promotion Play-Off Group
3	Homenmen Beirut	6	3	1	2	9	7	2	10	
4	Al Akha'a Ahli Alay	6	1	4	1	7	8	-1	7	
5	Mawadda Trablos	6	1	2	3	10	13	-3	5	
6	Nahda Beirut	6	1	2	3	5	8	-3	5	
7	Riyada wal Adab	6	0	2	4	4	11	-7	2	Relegation to the Lebanese Third Division

== Top scorers ==
Rank	Name	Club	Goals
1	(Lebanon) Unknown	Al-Modh Tripoli	6
2	(Lebanon) Unknown	Al-Ahli Nabatiyah	4
-	(Lebanon) Jalal Zayed	Al Akha'a Ahli Alay	4
-	(Lebanon) Unknown	Al-Ishlas	4
3	(Lebanon) Unknown	Homenmen Beirut	3
-	(Lebanon) Unknown	Al-Irshad	3

== Promotion and Relegation ==
=== Promotion to the Premier League ===
- TBA
- TBA

=== Relegation to the Third Division ===
- TBA
- TBA
