= Hassan El Mohamad =

Lebanese footballer (born 1988)

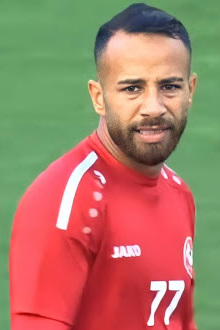
- El Mohamad with Akhaa Ahli Aley in 2019

Personal information
- Full name: Hassan Jamal El Mohamad
- Date of birth: 24 August 1988 (age 38)
- Place of birth: Lagos, Nigeria
- Height: 1.73 m (5 ft 8 in)
- Position: Forward

Youth career
- –2005: Jwaya

Senior career*
Years	Team	Apps	(Gls)
2005–2007	Rayyan		
2007–2008	Ahli Saida		(1)
2010–2011	Irshad		
2011–2014	Nejmeh	46	(22)
2014	Sarawak	2	(0)
2014–2019	Nejmeh	75	(19)
2019–2020	Akhaa Ahli Aley	0	(0)
2020	Safa	4	(1)

International career
2012–2017	Lebanon	21	(0)
- * Club domestic league appearances and goals

Hassan Jamal El Mohamad (Arabic: حسن جمال المحمد; born 24 August 1988) is a former footballer who played as a forward. Born in Nigeria, he played for the Lebanon national team.

== Early life ==
El Mohamad was born on 24 August 1988 in Lagos, Nigeria, to Lebanese parents. His father played football professionally in Nigeria as a striker. El Mohamad and his family then emigrated to Lebanon, settling in their hometown Jwaya in the South Governorate. El Mohamad played football for the local club, attracting the attention of various scouts.

== Club career ==
In 2005, aged 17, El Mohamad signed for Lebanese Premier League side Rayyan, without, however, playing any game in the first season. The following season, in 2006–07, El Mohamad debuted for the team in the Lebanese top flight; he was awarded the 2006–07 Lebanese Young Player of the Year. Following Rayyan's relegation to the Second Division, El Mohamad joined Ahli Saida for the 2007–08 season.

After a two-year break from football, El Mohamad joined Irshad in 2010. The following year, in 2011, El Mohamad joined Nejmeh under coach Moussa Hojeij. In 2014 El Mohamad joined Malaysian side Sarawak; however, following an injury to the ankle, El Mohamad returned to Lebanon to receive treatment. The same year, he re-joined Nejmeh.

In 2019, after nine years at Nejmeh, El Mohamad joined Akhaa Ahli Aley. On 6 September 2020, El Mohamad joined Safa. On 17 November 2020, El Mohamad announced his retirement from football aged 32.

== Personal life ==
El Mohamad's favourite player worldwide is Lionel Messi, while his preferred Lebanese player is Hassan Maatouk. His favourite club is English side Manchester United.

== Honours ==
Nejmeh

- Lebanese Premier League: 2013–14
- Lebanese FA Cup: 2015–16

Individual

- Lebanese Premier League Best Young Player: 2006–07
- Lebanese Premier League Team of the Season: 2012–13

== See also ==
- List of Lebanon international footballers born outside Lebanon
