= Mohamad Hammoud (footballer, born 1984) =

Lebanese footballer (born 1984)

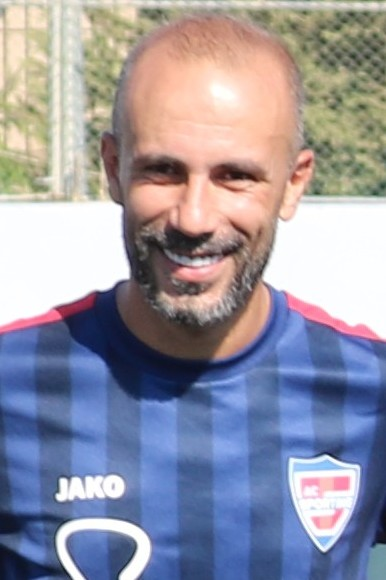
- Hammoud with Sporting in 2021

Personal information
- Full name: Mohamad Mostafa Hammoud
- Date of birth: 1 May 1984 (age 42)
- Place of birth: Beirut, Lebanon
- Height: 1.78 m (5 ft 10 in)
- Position: Right-back

Senior career*
Years	Team	Apps	(Gls)
2001–2009	Sagesse		
2009–2014	Akhaa Ahli Aley	63	(6)
2014–2017	Nejmeh	47	(2)
2017–2018	Shabab Arabi	15	(0)
2020–2022	Sporting	19+	(1+)
2022–2023	Akhaa Ahli Aley	8	(1)
2024–2025	Olympic Dmit		

International career
2011	Lebanon	3	(0)
- * Club domestic league appearances and goals

Mohamad Mostafa Hammoud (Arabic: محمد مصطفى حمود; born 1 May 1984) is a Lebanese former footballer who played as a right-back.

== Club career ==
Starting his career at Sagesse in 2001, Hammoud remained at the Beirut-based club until 2009, when he moved to Akhaa Ahli Aley. After spending five years at the club, he joined Nejmeh in 2014, before moving to Shabab Arabi in 2017, staying one season.

Hammoud moved to Sporting on 12 October 2020; he became the team captain, and helped his team gain promotion to the Lebanese Premier League for the first time.

Hammoud returned to Akhaa Ahli Aley on 13 July 2022.

== Honours ==
Sagesse

- Lebanese FA Cup runner-up: 2006
- Lebanese Federation Cup runner-up: 2004

Nejmeh

- Lebanese FA Cup: 2015–16
- Lebanese Elite Cup: 2014, 2016, 2017
- Lebanese Super Cup: 2014, 2016

Sporting

- Lebanese Second Division: 2020–21

Akhaa Ahli Aley

- Lebanese Challenge Cup: 2022
