= 2011–12 Lebanese Second Division =

Lebanese Second Division
- Season: 2011–12
- Champions: Al Egtmaaey Tripoli
- Promoted: Al Egtmaaey Tripoli Shabab Al-Ghazieh
- Relegated: none

The 2011–12 Lebanese Second Division is the current 78th season of the second-highest level of Soccer in Lebanon. This season featured 14 Clubs divided into two sub-division groups.

== Teams ==
This is list of the 14 teams is for the season

Group 1

- Harakat al Shabab FC
- Hekmeh FC
- Al Egtmaaey Tripoli
- Al-Mawadda Tripoli FC
- Al-Nahda Bar Elias FC
- Salam Zgharta
- Al-Shabab Tripoli FC

Group 2

- Al-Ahli Nabatieh
- Al-Fajr Arabsalim
- Homenmen Beirut
- Al-Irshad
- Al Islah Al Bourj Al Shimaly
- Al Khoyol FC
- Shabab Al-Ghazieh
