= 2005–06 Lebanese Second Division =

Lebanese Second Division
- Season: 2005–06
- Champions: Shabab Al-Sahel
- Runner up: Hekmeh FC
- Promoted: Shabab Al-Sahel; Hekmeh FC; Al-Ahli Saida
- Relegated: Al Egtmaaey Tripoli
- Top goalscorer: Paul Rustom (14)

The 2005–06 Lebanese Second Division was the 72nd season of the Second Division league which featured 12 Clubs. 3 of these teams were eligible for promotion to the top league of Lebanese football, the Lebanese Premier League while 1 of the 12 teams had to face relegation to the Lebanese Third Division for the 2006–07 Season.

From the 2004–05 Football League, 3 teams were relegated to the Second Division. However, 2 teams were brought up to the Football League from the 2004–05 Second Division, these 2 teams being Salam Zgharta and Racing Beirut. This was due to the Lebanese Football Federation announcing it will reduce the number of teams in the Football League from 11 to 10 for the 2005–06 Season leading to an increase in the number of teams in the Second Division.

At the end of the season, Shabab Al-Sahel earned the title after finishing on 56 Points, 5 clear of the nearest club, Al-Hikma who finished 2nd on 51 Points with 16 victories, 3 draws and just 3 losses for the Season. The last team in this season to earn promotion was the Al-Ahli Sidon team who finished 3rd and just 1 point behind Al-Hikma.

== Final table ==
Pos	Team	Plyd	Won	Draw	Lost	F	A	F/A	Pts	Promotion/Relegation
1	Shabab Al-Sahel	22	18	2	2	42	16	26	56	Promoted to Lebanese Premier League
2	Hekmeh FC	22	16	3	3	50	12	38	51	Promoted to Lebanese Premier League
3	Al-Ahli Saida	22	14	5	3	37	11	26	50	Promoted to Lebanese Premier League
4	Al Tadamon Nabatieh	22	15	3	4	32	16	16	48	
5	Al Akhaa Al Ahli	22	10	4	8	33	27	6	34	
6	Racing Jounieh FC	22	7	4	11	29	33	-4	25	
7	Al Ahli Nabtieh	22	6	6	10	21	34	-13	24	
8	Homenmen Beirut	21	6	5	10	23	33	-10	23	
9	Al-Bourj FC	22	5	4	13	24	40	-16	19	
10	Homenetmen Beirut	22	5	3	14	20	39	-19	18	
11	Al-Mahaba Tripoli	22	5	3	14	27	47	-20	18	
12	Al Egtmaaey Tripoli	22	3	2	17	32	59	-27	11	Relegated to Lebanese Third Division

== Top scorers ==
Goals	Player	Club
14	Paul Rustom	Hekmeh FC
9	Mohamed Naser	Al-Ahli Saida
8	Jose Carlos	Hekmeh FC
7	Ali Hawila	Al-Ahli Saida
6	Unknown	Unknown
5	Unknown	Al Egtmaaey Tripoli
5	Unknown	Hekmeh FC
5	Unknown	Al Ahli Nabtieh
5	Jaafar Morsel	Homenmen Beirut
5	Hussain Ballot	Shabab Al-Sahel

== Relegation/Promotion ==
=== Relegation from Football League from 2005–06 Season ===
- Racing Beirut

=== Promotion to Football League from 2005–06 Season ===
- Shabab Al-Sahel
- Hekmeh FC
- Al-Ahli Saida

=== Relegation to Third Division from the 2005–06 Season ===
- Al Egtmaaey Tripoli
