= 2014 Lebanese Elite Cup =

Lebanese Elite Cup
- Season: 2014
- Champions: Nejmeh
- Matches played: 9
- Goals scored: 16 (1.78 per match)

The 2014 Lebanese Elite Cup is the 17th edition of this football tournament in Lebanon. The competition started on 23 August through to the final in September. This tournament used to include the six best teams from the 2013–14 Lebanese Premier League season, but this edition also featured Salam Zgharta, who only just avoided relegation in 10th place, but won the 2013–14 Lebanese FA Cup.

== Group stage ==
=== Group A ===
| Team | Pld | W | D | L | GF | GA | GD | Pts |
|---|---|---|---|---|---|---|---|---|
| (Lebanon) Safa | 2 | 1 | 1 | 0 | 2 | 0 | +2 | 4 |
| (Lebanon) Al-Nejmeh | 2 | 1 | 0 | 1 | 2 | 3 | −1 | 3 |
| (Lebanon) Racing Beirut | 2 | 0 | 1 | 1 | 1 | 2 | −1 | 1 |

23 August 2014
14:30

| Safa | 2 – 0 | Al-Nejmeh |

26 August 2014
14:30

| Al-Nejmeh | 2 – 1 | Racing Beirut |

30 August 2014
14:30

| Safa | 0 – 0 | Racing Beirut |

=== Group B ===
| Team | Pld | W | D | L | GF | GA | GD | Pts |
|---|---|---|---|---|---|---|---|---|
| (Lebanon) Tripoli | 2 | 1 | 1 | 0 | 2 | 1 | +1 | 4 |
| (Lebanon) Salam Zgharta | 2 | 0 | 2 | 0 | 2 | 2 | 0 | 2 |
| (Lebanon) Al Ahed | 2 | 0 | 1 | 1 | 1 | 2 | −1 | 1 |

23 August 2014
15:30

| Tripoli | 1 – 1 | Salam Zgharta |

26 August 2014
15:30

| Salam Zgharta | 1 – 1 | Al Ahed |

30 August 2014
15:30

| Al Ahed | 0 – 1 | Tripoli |

== Final stage ==
Semi-finals
4 September - Beirut
Tripoli | 0(6)
Al-Nejmeh | 0(7)
4 September - Beirut
Safa | 2
Salam Zgharta | 0

Final
14 September - Beirut
Al-Nejmeh | 3
Safa | 1

=== Semi finals ===
4 September 20134
13:45

| Tripoli | 0 – 0 6 - 7 penalties | Al-Nejmeh |

4 September 2014
13:45

| Safa | 2 – 0 | Salam Zgharta |

=== Finals ===
14 September 2014
13:45

| Al-Nejmeh | 3 – 1 | Safa |

Camille Chamoun Sports City Stadium, Beirut
