= Hassan Chaitou =

Lebanese footballer (born 1991)

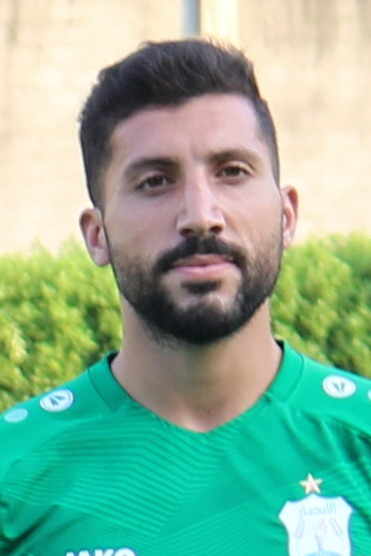
- Chaitou with Ansar in 2020

Personal information
- Full name: Hassan Samih Chaitou
- Date of birth: 16 June 1991 (age 35)
- Place of birth: At Tiri, Lebanon
- Height: 1.82 m (6 ft 0 in)
- Position: Left-back

Team information
- Current team: Tripoli
- Number: 16

Youth career
- 2010–2011: Khoyol

Senior career*
Years	Team	Apps	(Gls)
2011–2013	Khoyol		
2013–2015	Safa	4	(0)
2015–2023	Ansar	78	(4)
2023–2025	Safa	45	(0)
2025–2026	Nejmeh	16	(0)
2026–	Tripoli	0	(0)

International career^{‡}
2012	Lebanon U22	5	(0)
2018–2024	Lebanon	21	(0)
- * Club domestic league appearances and goals as of 01:20, 27 July 2026 (UTC) ‡ National team caps and goals as of 26 March 2024

Hassan Samih Chaitou (Arabic: حسن سميح شعيتو, Lebanese Arabic pronunciation: [ˈħasan saˈmiːħ ˈʃʕajto, -tu]; born 16 June 1991), also known as Shibriko (Arabic: شبريكو), is a Lebanese footballer who plays as a left-back for Lebanese Premier League club Tripoli.

Coming through their youth sector, Chaitou made his senior debut in the Lebanese Second Division with Khoyol in 2011. He moved to Safa in the Lebanese Premier League two years later, helping them win a Lebanese Super Cup in 2013. Chaitou joined Ansar in 2015, quickly establishing himself as a regular. He won a league title, two Lebanese FA Cups and one Super Cup in eight seasons with the side. Chaitou returned to Safa in 2023, and moved to Nejmeh in 2025, winning the Lebanese FA Cup.

Chaitou initially represented Lebanon internationally at under-22 level, playing in the 2013 AFC U-22 Championship qualifiers. He made his senior-team debut in 2018, and was called up to the 2019 and 2023 AFC Asian Cups.

== Early life ==
Born in At Tiri, Lebanon, Chaitou was raised in Haret Hreik, in the southern suburbs of Beirut. Chaitou's nickname, "Shibriko", originated in his childhood after he wore a jersey belonging to his older brother, who played for a local club named Shibriko in Haret Hreik. Friends began calling him by the name printed on the shirt, and the nickname eventually replaced his given name among family, friends and later throughout his football career.

While in his second year of studying electronics at the University of Sciences and Arts in Lebanon (USAL), he was encouraged by his cousin to join Khoyol. After playing in the youth championship, he was promoted to the first team.

== Club career ==
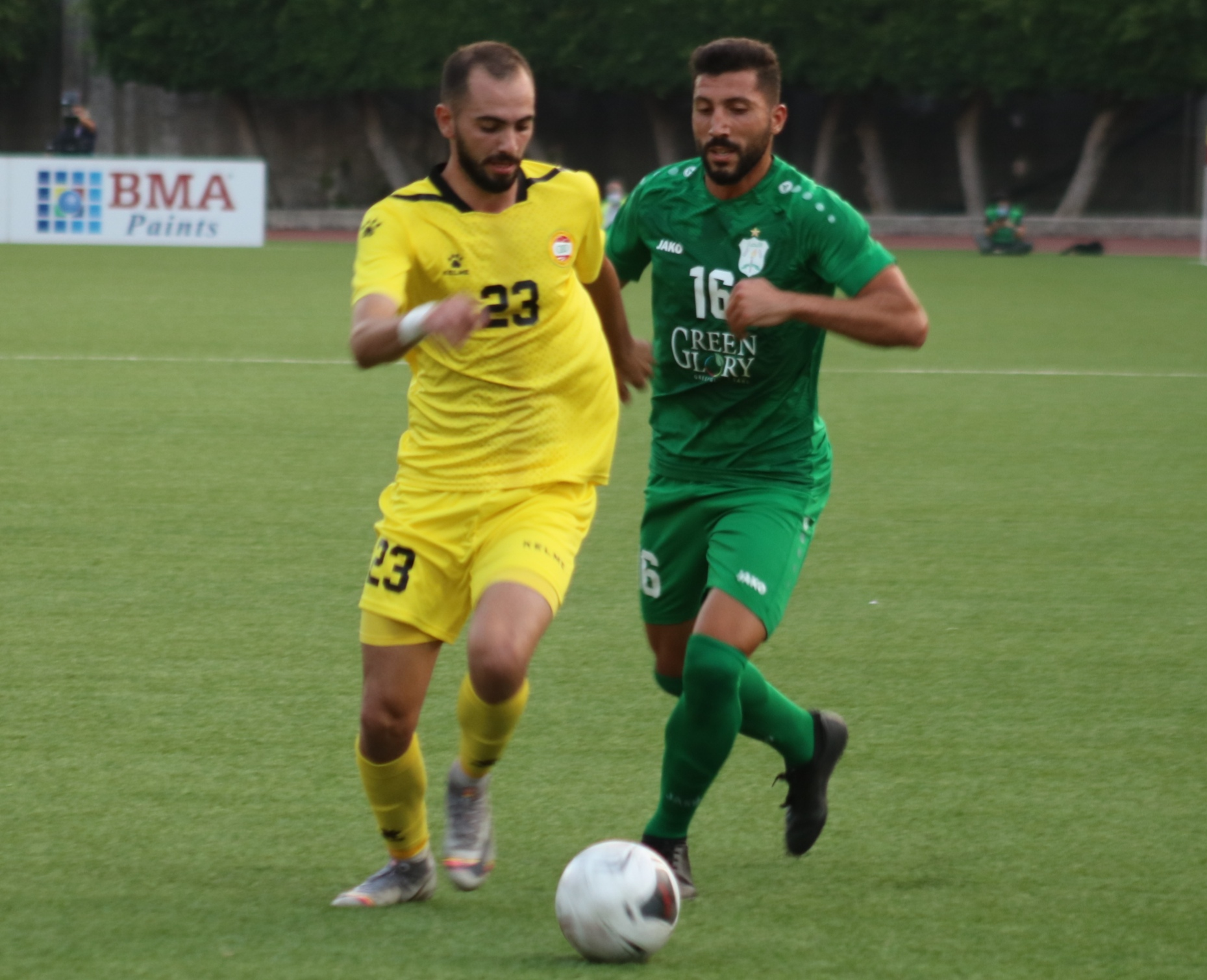
Chaitou (right) with Ansar against Ahed in 2020

=== Safa ===
Coming through the youth system, Chaitou began his senior career at Lebanese Second Division side Khoyol during the 2011–12 season. Following two seasons, Lebanese Premier League club Safa announced the signing of Chaitou on 7 March 2013. In his first season at Safa, Chaito won the 2013 Lebanese Super Cup, beating Shabab Sahel 2–1 in the final. During the 2013–14 season, Chaito played four league games. The following season (2014–15), Chaito did not feature in the league for Safa.

=== Ansar ===
In 2015 Chaitou joined Ansar. He became a regular for the team, playing 15 league games during the 2015–16 season. The following season, in 2016–17, Chaitou helped his side win the 2016–17 Lebanese FA Cup; he scored three goals in 13 league games that season. In 2020–21, Chaitou helped Ansar win their first league title since 2007, and their 14th overall. He also helped Ansar win the double, beating Nejmeh in the 2020–21 Lebanese FA Cup final on penalty shoot-outs.

During his final seasons at Ansar, Chaitou missed time after suffering a fractured ankle that required surgery. Chaitou remained with Ansar until 2023, serving as club captain before departing for Safa.

=== Safa, Nejmeh, Tripoli ===
Chaitou returned to Safa in March 2023. In August 2025, he joined Nejmeh. In September 2026, Chaitou signed for Tripoli.

== International career ==
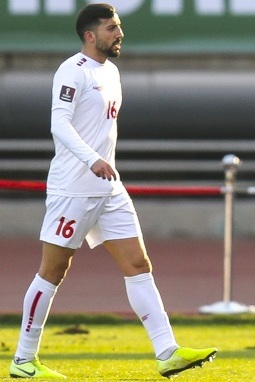
Chaitou with the Lebanon national team against Iran in 2022

Chaitou played for the Lebanon national under-22 team at the 2013 AFC U-22 Championship qualification in 2012.

His senior international debut for Lebanon came on 20 November 2018, in a friendly against Australia; Lebanon lost 3–0. In December 2018, Chaitou was called up for the 2019 AFC Asian Cup squad. However, he did not play in the tournament. In December 2023, Chaitou was included in the Lebanese squad for the 2023 AFC Asian Cup.

== Style of play ==
A modern full-back, Chaitou is a quick player who can both attack and defend down the wing. Chaitou initially played as a striker during his first-team spell at Khoyol before later being converted into a full-back.

== Personal life ==
Before beginning his football career, Chaitou studied electronics at the University of Sciences and Arts in Lebanon (USAL). In September 2026, he obtained his bachelor's degree in physical education from USAL.

== Career statistics ==
=== International ===
As of match played 26 March 2024

Appearances and goals by national team and year
National team	Year	Apps	Goals
Lebanon	2018	2	0
Lebanon	2019	8	0
Lebanon	2020	0	0
Lebanon	2021	6	0
Lebanon	2022	1	0
Lebanon	2023	1	0
Lebanon	2024	3	0
Total		21	0

== Honours ==
Safa

- Lebanese Super Cup: 2013

Ansar

- Lebanese Premier League: 2020–21
- Lebanese FA Cup: 2016–17, 2020–21; runner-up: 2021–22
- Lebanese Super Cup: 2021
- Lebanese Elite Cup runner-up: 2022

Nejmeh

- Lebanese FA Cup: 2025–26
