= 2013–14 Lebanese FA Cup =

2013-14 Lebanese FA Cup
Tournament details
- Country: Lebanon
- Teams: 16

Final positions
- Champions: Salam Zgharta
- Runners-up: Tripoli SC

Tournament statistics
- Matches played: 15
- Goals scored: 42 (2.8 per match)

The 2013-14 edition of the Lebanese FA Cup is the 42nd edition to be played. It is the premier knockout tournament for football teams in Lebanon.

The winners qualify for the 2015 AFC Cup.

The qualifying rounds take place in late 2013 with the Premier League clubs joining at the Round of 16 in early 2014.

== Round of 16 ==
10 January 2014

Tripoli	2 – 0	Al-Ahli Saida

10 January 2014

Al-Mabarrah	1 – 3	Al-Akhaa Al-Ahli

11 January 2014

Salam Zgharta	3 – 1	Nabi Sheet

11 January 2014

Al-Ansar	3 – 0	Tadamon Beirut

12 January 2014

Tadamon Sour	1 – 3	Racing Beirut

12 January 2014

Shabab Al-Ghazieh	1 – 2	Al-Ahed

12 January 2014

Safa	1 – 2	Shabab Al-Sahel

12 January 2014

Al-Nejmah	1 – 0	Al Egtmaaey Tripoli

== Quarter finals ==
18 January 2014

Al-Akhaa Al-Ahli	5 – 0	Al-Ahed

19 January 2014

Shabab Al-Sahel	1 – 2	Tripoli

19 January 2014

Racing Beirut	0 – 1	Salam Zgharta

19 January 2014

Al-Ansar	0 – 3	Al-Nejmah
		Hamam 25'; Moghrabi 42'; Mohamad 77'

== Semi finals ==
27 April 2014

Al-Akhaa Al-Ahli	1 – 2 (a.e.t.)	Salam Zgharta

28 April 2014

Al-Nejmah	1 – 2	Tripoli

== Final ==
31 May 2014

Salam Zgharta	1 – 0 (a.e.t.)	Tripoli
