= 2022–23 Lebanese Second Division =

Lebanese Second Division
- Season: 2022–23
- Dates: 2 September 2022 – 4 March 2023
- Champions: Racing Beirut
- Promoted: Racing Beirut; Ahli Nabatieh
- Relegated: Shabab Bourj; Ahli Saida
- Matches: 105
- Goals: 279 (2.66 per match)
- Top goalscorer: Mostafa Hallak; Haidar Awada (12 goals each)
- Biggest win: Riyadi Abbasiyah 8–0 Ahli Saida (9 September 2022)
- Highest scoring: Riyadi Abbasiyah 8–0 Ahli Saida (9 September 2022)
- Longest winning run: 6 matches Racing Beirut
- Longest unbeaten run: 9 matches Riyadi Abbasiyah
- Longest winless run: 8 matches Ahli Saida; Mabarra
- Longest losing run: 5 matches Bint Jbeil; Sporting

The Lebanese Second Division (Arabic: الدوري اللبناني الدرجة الثانية) is the second division of Lebanese football. It is controlled by the Lebanese Football Association. The top two teams qualify for the Lebanese Premier League and replace the relegated teams, while the bottom two are relegated to the Lebanese Third Division.

It was the third season to feature a "split" format, following its introduction in 2020–21, where the season was divided into two phases. The league was played between 2 September 2022 and 4 March 2023; Racing Beirut and Ahli Nabatieh, who finished first and second respectively, were promoted to the Premier League, while Shabab Bourj, who withdrew, and Ahli Saida were relegated to the Third Division.

== League table ==
Pos	Team	Pld	W	D	L	GF	GA	GD	Pts	Promotion or relegation (Note: Teams played each other once (11 matches), before the league was split into two groups (the top six and the bottom six). Teams carried over half their point tally from the first phase into the second phase.)
1	Racing Beirut (C, P)	20	14	4	2	42	15	+27	34	Promotion to Lebanese Premier League
2	Ahli Nabatieh (P)	20	11	5	4	26	12	+14	29	Promotion to Lebanese Premier League
3	Islah Borj Shmali	20	11	2	7	30	24	+6	27	
4	Sporting	20	9	1	10	26	24	+2	20	
5	Shabab Baalbeck	20	7	4	9	26	35	−9	17	
6	Bint Jbeil	20	5	5	10	21	27	−6	13	
7	Riyadi Abbasiyah	18	10	4	4	32	16	+16	27	
8	Nahda Barelias	18	7	1	10	15	25	−10	16	
9	Egtmaaey	18	6	3	9	21	28	−7	15	
10	Mabarra	18	3	6	9	24	33	−9	13	
11	Ahli Saida (R)	18	3	3	12	16	40	−24	9	Relegation to Lebanese Third Division
12	Shabab Bourj (Note: Shabab Bourj withdrew and their matches from the first half of the season were annulled.) (R)	0	0	0	0	0	0	0	0	Withdraw

Source: Global Sports Archive
Rules for classification: 1) Points; 2) Head-to-head points; 3) Head-to-head goal difference; 4) Goal difference; 5) Goals scored; 6) Draw.
(C) Champions; (P) Promoted; (R) Relegated

== Goalscorers ==
Rank	Player	Club	Goals
1	(Lebanon) Haidar Awada	Ahli Nabatieh	12
1	(Palestine) Mostafa Hallak	Mabarra	12
3	(Lebanon) Hussein Ezeddine	Racing Beirut	11
4	(Lebanon) Ali Imad Moussawi	Racing Beirut	9
5	(Lebanon) Hassan Fakih	Riyadi Abbasiyah	7
5	(Lebanon) Fadel Ajami	Riyadi Abbasiyah	7
5	(Lebanon) Mohammad Jawad	Bint Jbeil	7
5	(Lebanon) Hassan Chouman	Shabab Baalbek	7
5	(Lebanon) Ibrahim Abou Jabal	Racing Beirut	7
5	(Lebanon) Ali Bazzi	Sporting	7
