= Bilal Hajo =

Lebanese football player and coach (born 1980)

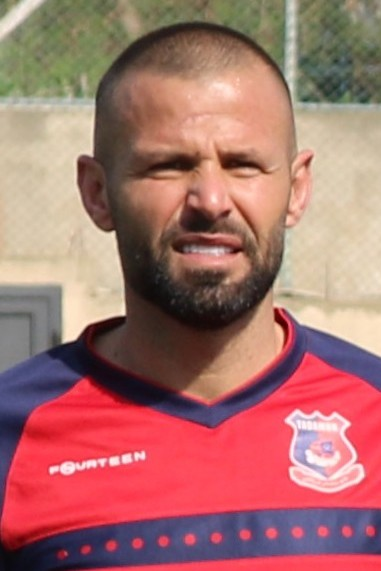
- Hajo with Tadamon Sour 2021

Personal information
- Full name: Bilal Hussein Hajo
- Date of birth: 1 February 1980 (age 46)
- Place of birth: Tyre, Lebanon
- Position: Defensive midfielder

Team information
- Current team: Tadamon Sour (assistant coach)

Senior career*
| Years | Team | Apps | (Gls) |
| 1999–2003 | Tadamon Sour | | (1) |
| 2004–2011 | Mabarra | | (10) |
| 2011–2022 | Tadamon Sour | 160 | (10) |

International career
| 2002 | Lebanon | 5 | (0) |

Managerial career
- 2022–: Tadamon Sour (assistant)
- * Club domestic league appearances and goals

Bilal Hussein Hajo (Arabic: بلال حسين حاجو; born 1 February 1980) is a Lebanese football coach and former player who is the assistant coach of Lebanese Premier League club Tadamon Sour. As a player, he played as a defensive midfielder.

== Club career ==
Hajo began his senior career with Tadamon Sour, coming through their youth sector. He helped them win the Lebanese FA Cup in 2000–01, and the Lebanese Premier League the same year (however, the Lebanese Football Association revoked the title from Tadamon). He also played for Mabarra, before returning to Tadamon.

In May 2022, Hajo decided to retire from football. He stated his intention to become head coach of a club in the near future.

== Managerial career ==
On 28 June 2022, Hajo was appointed assistant coach of Tadamon Sour, for whom he had already played at club level.

== Personal life ==
Hajo has two sons.

== Honours ==
Tadamon Sour

- Lebanese FA Cup: 2000–01
- Lebanese Challenge Cup: 2013, 2018; runner-up: 2017
- Lebanese Second Division: 2015–16

Mabarra

- Lebanese FA Cup: 2007–08; runner-up: 2009–10
- Lebanese Super Cup runner-up: 2008
