= Hussein Ezeddine =

Lebanese footballer (born 2002)

Personal information
- Full name: Hussein Ghassan Ezeddine
- Date of birth: 17 October 2002 (age 24)
- Place of birth: Bourj el-Barajneh, Lebanon
- Position: Winger

Team information
- Current team: Ahed
- Number: 11

Youth career
- Ahed

Senior career*
Years	Team	Apps	(Gls)
2021–	Ahed	49	(11)
2022–2024	→ Racing Beirut (loan)	42	(13)

International career^{‡}
2025–	Lebanon	2	(0)
- * Club domestic league appearances and goals as of 10:23, 3 August 2026 (UTC) ‡ National team caps and goals as of 26 November 2025

Hussein Ghassan Ezeddine (Arabic: حسين غسان عز الدين; born 17 October 2002) is a Lebanese footballer who plays as a winger for Lebanese Premier League club Ahed and the Lebanon national team.

== Club career ==
Coming through the youth system, Ezeddine made his senior debut for Ahed on 23 April 2021, as an 82nd-minute substitute in his team's 2–0 win against Akhaa Ahli Aley; this was his only appearance in the 2020–21 Lebanese Premier League. The following season, in 2021–22, Ezeddine played six games in all competitions.

In July 2025, Ezeddine was loaned out to Racing Beirut ahead of the 2022–23 Lebanese Second Division. He helped Racing win the Second Division and gain promotion to the Premier League, scoring 11 goals throughout the season. In the 2023–24 season, Ezeddine played 21 league games with Racing, scoring two goals in the process. His first Lebanese Premier League goal came on 28 September 2023, in a 1–1 draw against Nejmeh.

On 17 October 2025, the day of his 23rd birthday, Ezeddine scored both of Ahed's goals in a 2–0 win over Mabarra in the league.

== International career ==
Ezeddine was included in the Lebanon national under-23 team ahead of the 2023 WAFF U-23 Championship, without participating.

received his first senior call-up to the Lebanon national team ahead of an unofficial (Note: The match was not considered an official international fixture, as it was played in two 35-minute halves (70 minutes in total).) friendly against Qatar on 26 August. He eventually made his official debut on 18 November 2025, providing an assist in Lebanon's 3–0 win against Brunei in the 2027 AFC Asian Cup qualification.

== Career statistics ==
=== Club ===
As of match played 16 July 2026

Appearances and goals by club, season and competition
Club	Season	League			Lebanon Cup		League cup (Note: Includes Lebanese Elite Cup, Lebanese Federation Cup)		Continental		Other		Total	
Club	Season	Division	Apps	Goals	Apps	Goals	Apps	Goals	Apps	Goals	Apps	Goals	Apps	Goals
Ahed	2020–21	Lebanese Premier League	1	0	—		—		—		—		1	0
Ahed	2021–22	Lebanese Premier League	5	0	0	0	1	0	—		—		6	0
Ahed	2022–23	Lebanese Premier League	—		—		—		—		—		0	0
Ahed	2023–24	Lebanese Premier League	—		—		—		—		—		0	0
Ahed	2024–25	Lebanese Premier League	26	7	—		—		—		—		26	7
Ahed	2025–26	Lebanese Premier League	17	4	3	1	—		—		—		20	5
Ahed	Total		49	11	3	1	1	0	0	0	0	0	53	12
Racing Beirut	2022–23	Lebanese Second Division	21	11	1	0	—		—		—		22	11
Racing Beirut	2023–24	Lebanese Premier League	21	2	1	0	3	0	—		—		25	2
Racing Beirut	Total		42	13	2	0	3	0	0	0	0	0	47	13
Career total			91	24	5	1	4	0	0	0	0	0	100	25

=== International ===
As of match played 26 November 2025

Appearances and goals by national team and year
National team	Year	Apps	Goals
Lebanon	2025	2	0
Total		2	0

== Honours ==
Ahed

- Lebanese Premier League: 2021–22

Racing Beirut

- Lebanese Second Division: 2022–23
