= 2019 Lebanese Challenge Cup =

2019 edition of the Lebanese Challenge Cup

Tournament details
- Country: Lebanon
- Dates: 19 July – 24 August
- Teams: 6

Final positions
- Champions: Bourj (1st title)
- Runners-up: Salam Zgharta

Tournament statistics
- Matches played: 9
- Goals scored: 23 (2.56 per match)
- Attendance: 3,800 (422 per match)
- Top goal scorer(s): Abdel Fateh Achour; Amady Diop; Stephen Sarfo; Shamel Socar; Mohamed Zein Tahan (2 goals each)

The 2019 Lebanese Challenge Cup was the 7th edition of the Lebanese Challenge Cup. The competition included the teams placed between 7th and 10th in the 2018–19 Lebanese Premier League, and the two newly promoted teams from the 2018–19 Lebanese Second Division. The first matchday was played on 19 July, one day prior to the start of the 2019 Lebanese Elite Cup. Tadamon Sour are the defending champions, having won the 2018 final. The final was held on 24 August, with Bourj beating Salam Zgharta 2–0 to be crowned champions.

== Group stage ==
=== Group A ===
Pos	Team	Pld	W	D	L	GF	GA	GD	Pts	Qualification
1	Safa	2	1	1	0	6	2	+4	4	Advance to semi-finals
2	Tripoli	2	0	2	0	2	2	0	2	Advance to semi-finals
3	Shabab Bourj	2	0	1	1	0	4	−4	1	

Source: Goalzz
19 July 2019
17:00 UTC+3

Safa	4–0	Shabab Bourj
Al Othman 35'; Hazime 45+3'; Zein Tahan 78' (pen.), 84'	Report

Fouad Chehab Stadium, Jounieh
Attendance: 500
Referee: Ahmed Alaeddine

23 July 2019
17:00 UTC+3

Safa	2–2	Tripoli
Diop 13' (pen.), 22'	Report	Maqsoud 25'; Al Orja 90+3' (pen.)

Fouad Chehab Stadium, Jounieh
Attendance: 500
Referee: Kazem Al-Khansa

27 July 2019
17:00 UTC+3

Shabab Bourj	0–0	Tripoli

Fouad Chehab Stadium, Jounieh

=== Group B ===
Pos	Team	Pld	W	D	L	GF	GA	GD	Pts	Qualification
1	Bourj	2	2	0	0	3	0	+3	6	Advance to semi-finals
2	Salam Zgharta	2	0	1	1	3	4	−1	1	Advance to semi-finals
3	Tadamon Sour	2	0	1	1	3	5	−2	1	

Source: Goalzz
19 July 2019
17:00 UTC+3

Tadamon Sour	0–2	Bourj
	Report	Achour 17'; Baba Cisse 36'

Kfarjoz Stadium, Nabatieh
Referee: Kazem Al-Khansa

23 July 2019
17:00 UTC+3

Tadamon Sour	3–3	Salam Zgharta
Siblini 14'; El Ali 56'; Awada 90'	Report	Socar 55', 72'; Elijah 90+1'

Ahed Stadium, Beirut
Attendance: 500
Referee: Mohammed Issa

13 August 2019
16:30 UTC+3

Bourj	1–0	Salam Zgharta
Damaj 85'	Report

Fouad Chehab Stadium, Jounieh
Attendance: 500
Referee: Ahmed Saifan

== Final stage ==
Semi-finals; 17 August 2019
Safa	0
Salam Zgharta	1
Bourj	3
Tripoli	0

Final; 24 August 2019
Salam Zgharta	0
Bourj	2

=== Semi-finals ===
17 August 2019
16:30 UTC+3

Safa	0–1	Salam Zgharta
	Report	Ghafour 41'

Fouad Chehab Stadium, Jounieh
Attendance: 200
Referee: Jamil Ramadan

17 August 2019
16:30 UTC+3

Bourj	3–0	Tripoli
Sarfo 30', 67'; Abou Khalil 78'	Report

Amin Abdelnour Stadium, Bhamdoun
Attendance: 600
Referee: Samer Sayed Kassem

=== Final ===
24 August 2019
17:00 UTC+3

Salam Zgharta	0–2	Bourj
	Report	Abou Hamdan 46'; Achour 89'

Fouad Chehab Stadium, Jounieh
Attendance: 1,000
Referee: Hussein Abu Yahya

== Top scorers ==
Rank	Player	Club	Goals
1	(Lebanon) Abdel Fateh Achour	Bourj	2
1	(Ghana) Stephen Sarfo	Bourj	2
1	(Senegal) Amady Diop	Safa	2
1	(Lebanon) Mohamed Zein Tahan	Safa	2
1	(Jordan) Shamel Socar	Salam Zgharta	2
2	14 players		1
