= Al Shabab Al Arabi =

Al Shabab Al Arabi may refer to:

- Ansar Al Mawadda SC, formerly Al Shabab Al Arabi Club (Beirut), a Lebanese association football club
- Al Shabab Al Arabi Club (Dubai), a defunct Emirati association football club
