= Ossama Haidar =

Lebanese footballer (born 1980)

Personal information
- Full name: Ossama Hussein Haidar
- Date of birth: 14 January 1980 (age 46)
- Place of birth: Tayr Debba, Lebanon
- Position: Forward

Senior career*
Years	Team	Apps	(Gls)
1999–2004	Tadamon Sour		
2004–2010	Ahed		
2010–2015	Salam Sour		
2015–2016	Tadamon Sour		

International career
2002	Lebanon U23		
2002–2004	Lebanon	9	(0)
- * Club domestic league appearances and goals

Ossama Hussein Haidar (Arabic: أُسَامَة حُسَيْن حَيْدَر; born 14 January 1980) is a Lebanese former footballer who played as a forward.

== Club career ==
Haidar started his career at Tadamon Sour in 1999, before moving to Ahed in 2004. In 2010, Haidar moved to Salam Sour, before ending his career at Tadamon Sour in the 2015–16 Lebanese Second Division.

== International career ==
Haidar played for the Lebanon national team between 2002 and 2004, making 12 appearances.

== Honours ==
Individual

- Lebanese Premier League Team of the Season: 2006–07
