= List of association football clubs with multiple consecutive promotions or relegations =

This is a list of association football clubs with multiple consecutive promotions or relegations.

For an association football club to achieve three consecutive promotions is somewhat rare, to achieve subsequent further promotions even rarer. Many football league systems are organised in a pyramid system, allowing league champions and, in many cases, clubs placed immediately behind the champions to achieve promotion, either directly or through a play-off system. To achieve three or more promotions all as league champions, like the now defunct Gretna did from 2004 to 2007, or Chester did from 2010 to 2013 is exceptional.

It is comparably easier for a club to suffer three consecutive relegations, as no particular effort is required. In professional football and, to a lesser extent, in semi-professional and amateur football, this is often caused by financial trouble.

A club that achieves promotion, followed by immediate relegation, and a subsequent repeat of this cycle is often described as a yo-yo club.

Note:

- Dissolved and reformed clubs, and clubs relegated due to financial irregularities are not included in this list.

== Clubs ==
The list is sorted by number of promotions or relegations followed by the alphabetical order of location:

=== Promotions ===
Clubs with three or more consecutive promotions:

Club	Country	No	Leagues	Ref.
TJ Tatran Jakubčovice	Czechia	7	1999–00: Okresní soutěž Novojičínska (IX) – 1st 2000–01: Okresní přebor Novojičínska (VIII) – 1st 2001–02: I.B třída Slezské župy (VII) – 1st 2002–03: I.A třída Moravskoslezského kraje (VI) – 1st 2003–04: Přebor Moravskoslezského kraje (V) – 1st 2004–05: Divize E (IV) – 1st 2005–06: Moravskoslezské fotbalová liga (III) – 1st	
Grazer AK	Austria	6	2013–14: 1. Klasse Mitte A (VIII) – 1st 2014–15: Gebietsliga Mitte (VII) – 1st 2015–16: Unterliga Mitte (VI) – 1st 2016–17: Oberliga Mitte/West (V) – 1st 2017–18: Landesliga Steiermark (IV) – 1st 2018–19: Austrian Regionalliga Central (III) – 1st	
Dalkurd FF	Sweden	5	2005: Division 6 Dalarna Mellersta (VIII) – 1st 2006: Division 5 Dalarna Södra (VII) – 1st 2007: Division 4 Dalarna (VI) – 1st 2008: Division 3 Södra Norrland (V) – 1st 2009: Division 2 Norra Svealand (IV) – 1st	
SC Sagamihara	Japan	5	2008: Kanagawa Prefectural League Division 3 (VIII) – 1st 2009: Kanagawa Prefectural League Division 2 (VII) – 1st 2010: Kanagawa Prefectural League Division 1 (VI) – 1st 2011: Kantō League Division 2 (V) – 1st 2012: Kantō League Division 1 (IV) – 1st	
NK Zavrč	Slovenia	5	2008–09: MNZ Ptuj, 2. Class (VI) – 1st 2009–10: MNZ Ptuj, 1. Class (V) – 1st 2010–11: Styrian League (IV) – 1st 2011–12: Slovenian Third League East (III) – 1st 2012–13: Slovenian Second League (II) – 1st	
SV Rödinghausen	Germany	5	2009–10: Kreisliga A (IX) – 1st 2010–11: Bezirksliga Westfalen 1 (VIII) – 1st 2011–12: Landesliga Westfalen-Ost (VII) – 1st 2012–13: Westfalenliga 1 (VI) – 1st 2013–14: Oberliga Westfalen (V) – 2nd	
TV Herkenrath	Germany	5	2010–11: Kreisliga C (XI) – 1st 2011–12: Kreisliga B (X) – 1st 2012–13: Kreisliga A (VIII) – 2nd 2013–14: Bezirksliga Mittelrhein 1 (VII) – 1st 2014–15: Landesliga Mittelrhein 1 (VI) – 2nd	
Varesina Calcio	Italy	5	2010–11: Terza Categoria Lombardy (IX) – 1st 2011–12: Seconda Categoria Lombardy (VIII) – 1st 2012–13: Prima Categoria Lombardy (VII) – 1st 2013–14: Promozione Lombardy (VI) – 1st 2014–15: Eccellenza Lombardy (V) – 1st	
Iwaki FC	Japan	5	2015: Fukushima Prefectural League Division 3 (IX) – 1st 2016: Fukushima Prefectural League Division 2 (VIII) – 1st 2017: Fukushima Prefectural League Division 1 (VII) – 1st 2018: Tohoku League Division 2 South (VI) – 1st 2019: Tohoku League Division 1 (V) – 1st	
C.F. Os Belenenses	Portugal	5	2018–19: AF Lisboa Third Division (VII) – 1st 2019–20: AF Lisboa Second Division (VI) – 1st 2020–21: AF Lisboa First Division (V) – 1st 2021–22: Campeonato de Portugal (IV) – best 3rd 2022–23: Liga 3 (III) – 2nd	
Olympique Akbou	Algeria	5	2018–19: Division d'Honneur (VII) – 1st 2019–20: Régionale II (VI) – 1st 2021–22: Régionale I (IV) (Note: The professional Ligue 2 being removed from the pyramid in 2020, all subsequent tiers gained one step.) (Note: The 2020–21 season was not held due to the COVID-19 pandemic.) – 1st 2022–23: Ligue 3 (III) – 1st 2023–24: Ligue 2 (II) – 1st	
India On Track FC	India	5	2019–20: Division 3 Mumbai Football Association (IX) – 4th 2021–22: Division 2 Mumbai Football Association (VIII) – 4th 2022–23: Division 1 Mumbai Football Association (VII) – 1st 2023–24: Super Division Mumbai Football Association (VI) – 2nd 2024–25: Elite Division (Mumbai Premier League) Mumbai Football Association (V) – 1st	
FC Enikon Augsburg (Note: Club defunct)	Germany	4	1990–91: A-Klasse Augsburg (VII) – 1st 1991–92: Bezirksliga Schwaben-Süd (VI) – 2nd 1992–93: Bezirksoberliga Schwaben (V) – 2nd 1993–94: Landesliga Bayern-Süd (IV) – 2nd	
Young Boys	Netherlands	4	2004–05: Vijfde Klasse (VIII) – 1st 2005–06: Vierde Klasse (VII) – 1st 2006–07: Derde Klasse (VI) – 1st 2007–08: Tweede Klasse (V) – 1st	
NK Olimpija Ljubljana	Slovenia	4	2005–06: Division 5 Ljubljana (V) – 1st 2006–07: Division 4 Ljubljana (IV) – 1st 2007–08: Slovenian Third League West (III) – 1st 2008–09: Slovenian Second League (II) – 1st	
Truro City F.C.	England	4	2005–06: South Western League (XI) – 1st 2006–07: Western League Division One (X) – 2nd 2007–08: Western League Premier Division (IX) – 1st 2008–09: Southern League Division One South & West (VIII) – 1st	
Shaw Lane A.F.C.	England	4	2011–12: Sheffield & Hallam County Senior League Division 1 (XII) – 2nd 2012–13: Sheffield & Hallam County Senior League Premier Division (XI) – 1st 2013–14: Northern Counties East League Division 1 (X) – 2nd 2014–15: Northern Counties East League Premier Division (IX) – 1st	
FC Mynai	Ukraine	4	2017: Zakarpattia Oblast Championship (V) – 1st 2017–18: Ukrainian Amateur Football Championship (IV) – 1st in Group 1, play-off quarterfinal 2018–19: Ukrainian Second League (III) – 1st in Group A, play-off finalist 2019–20: Ukrainian First League (II) – 1st	
Treherbert BGC	Wales	4	2019–20: Rhondda & District League Premier Division – 1st (2020–21 cancelled due to COVID-19) 2021–22: South Wales Alliance League Division Two – 1st 2022–23: South Wales Alliance League Division One – 2nd 2023–24: South Wales Alliance League Premier Division – 3rd	
Afan United F.C.	Wales	4	2021–22: Port Talbot Football League First Division – 1st 2022–23: Port Talbot Football League Premier Division – 1st 2023–24: South Wales Alliance League Division One West – 1st 2024–25: South Wales Premier League Championship Division – 1st	
Bayside Argonauts FC	Australia	4	2023: Victorian State League Division 3 South-East – 2nd (VII) 2024: Victorian State League Division 2 South-East – 1st (VI) 2025: Victorian State League Division 1 South-East – 2nd (V) 2026: Victorian Premier League 2 – 3rd (playoffs) (IV)	
FC Naftokhimik Kremenchuk	Ukraine	3	1992: Poltava Oblast Championship (V) – 1st in Group South, play-offs winner 1992–93: Transitional League (IV) – 1st 1993–94: Ukrainian Second League (III) – 4th	
FC Lviv	Ukraine	3	1992–93: Lviv Oblast Championship (VI) – 1st, promoted two levels 1993–94: Transitional League (IV) – 4th 1994–95: Ukrainian Second League (III) – 2nd	
CSKA-Borysfen	Ukraine	3	1992–93: Transitional League (IV) – 4th (as FC Nyva Myronivka and FC Nyva-Borysfen Myronivka) 1993–94: Ukrainian Second League (III) – 1st (as FC Borysfen Boryspil and FC Boryspil) 1994–95: Ukrainian First League (II) – 2nd (as FC Borysfen Boryspil and FC CSKA-Borysfen Kyiv)	
FC Metalurh Novomoskovsk	Ukraine	3	1992–93: Dnipropetrovsk Oblast Championship (VI) – 1st 1993–94: Ukrainian Amateur League (V) – 1st in Group 5 1994–95: Ukrainian Third League (IV) – 8th	
TSV 1860 München II	Germany	3	1994–95: Bezirksoberliga Oberbayern (VI) – 2nd 1995–96: Landesliga Bayern-Süd (V) – 1st 1996–97: Bayernliga (IV) – 1st	
JK Dünamo Tallinn	Estonia	3	2002: III Liiga North (IV) – 1st 2003: II Liiga North/East (III) – 1st 2004: Esiliiga (II) – 4th (playoffs)	
Gretna F.C.	Scotland	3	2004–05: Scottish Third Division (IV) – 1st 2005–06: Scottish Second Division (III) – 1st 2006–07: Scottish First Division (II) – 1st	
Kasımpaşa S.K.	Turkey	3	2004–05: TFF Third League TFF Third League 3rd Group (IV) – 1st 2005–06: TFF Second League TFF Second League 1st Group (III) – 1st 2006–07: TFF First League TFF First League (II) – 5th (playoffs)	
F.C. United of Manchester	England	3	2005–06: North West Counties Football League Division Two (X) – 1st 2006–07: North West Counties Football League Division One (IX) – 1st 2007–08: Northern Premier League Division One North (VIII) – 2nd (playoffs)	
T&T Hanoi FC	Vietnam	3	2006: Third League (IV) – 1st 2007: Second League (III) – 2nd 2008: V.League 2 (II) – 2nd	
Slimbridge F.C.	England	3	2007–08: Gloucester Northern Senior League Premier Division (XII) – 1st 2008–09: Gloucestershire County League (XI) – 1st 2009–10: Hellenic League Division One West (X) – 1st	
Chester F.C.	England	3	2010–11: Northern Premier League Division One North (VIII) – 1st 2011–12: Northern Premier League (VII) – 1st 2012–13: Conference North (VI) – 1st	
Avondale Heights SC	Australia	3	2012: Victorian State League Division Three North-West (V) – 1st 2013: Victorian State League Division Two North-West (IV) – 2nd 2014: National Premier Leagues Victoria Division One (III) – 1st	
Kings Langley F.C.	England	3	2013–14: Spartan South Midlands Football League Division One (VIII) – 2nd 2014–15: Spartan South Midlands Football League Premier Division (VII) – 1st 2015–16: Southern Football League Division One Central (VI) – 1st	
Parma Calcio 1913	Italy	3	2015–16: Serie D (IV) – 1st 2016–17: Serie C (III) – 2nd 2017–18: Serie B (II) – 2nd	
South Shields F.C.	England	3	2015–16: Northern Football League Division 2 (X) – 1st 2016–17: Northern Football League Division 1 (IX) – 1st 2017–18: Northern Premier League Division One North (VIII) – 1st	
FC Hermannstadt	Romania	3	2015–16: Liga IV Sibiu County (IV) – 1st 2016–17: Liga III Seria V (III) – 1st 2017–18: Liga II (II) – 2nd	
UD Tamaraceite	Spain	3	2015–16: Segunda Regional Aficionado-Gran Canaria (VII) – 1st 2016–17: Primera Regional Aficionado-Gran Canaria (VI) – 1st 2017–18: Interinsular Preferente de Las Palmas (V) – 1st	
Centro Sportivo Alagoano	Brazil	3	2016: Série D (IV) – 2nd 2017: Série C (III) – 1st 2018: Série B (II) – 2nd	
Bromsgrove Sporting F.C.	England	3	2016–17: Midland Football League Division 1 (X) – 1st 2017–18: Northern Football League Premier Division (IX) – 1st 2018–19: Southern Football League Division One Central (VIII) – 1st	
Shabab El Bourj SC	Lebanon	3	2016–17: Lebanese Fourth Division (IV) – 1st in Group 2 2017–18: Lebanese Third Division (III) – 2nd 2018–19: Lebanese Second Division (II) – 2nd	
Zawisza Bydgoszcz	Poland	3	2016–17: Klasa B Bydgoszcz III (VIII) – 1st 2017–18: Klasa A Bydgoszcz I (VII) – 1st 2018–19: Klasa okręgowa kujawsko-pomorska I (VI) – 1st	
FC VPK-Ahro Shevchenkivka	Ukraine	3	2018: Dnipropetrovsk Oblast Championship (V) – 1st 2018–19: Ukrainian Amateur Football Championship (IV) – 1st in Group 3, play-offs winner 2019–20: Ukrainian Second League (III) – 1st in Group B	
FC Alians Lypova Dolyna	Ukraine	3	2018: Sumy Oblast Championship (V) – 1st 2018–19: Ukrainian Amateur Football Championship (IV) – 3rd in Group 2, play-off quarterfinal 2019–20: Ukrainian Second League (III) – 3rd in Group B (playoffs)	
Walton & Hersham F.C.	England	3	2020–21: Combined Counties Football League Division One (X) – 2nd 2021–22: Combined Counties Football League Premier Division South (IX) – 2nd 2022–23: Isthmian League Division One South Central (VIII) – 2nd (playoffs)	
Dial Square F.C.	England	3	2021–22: Guildford and Woking Alliance Football League Premier Division (X) – 2nd 2022–23: Surrey County Intermediate League (Western) Division One (II) – 2nd 2023–24: Surrey County Intermediate League (Western) Premier Division (X) – 1st	
Wrexham A.F.C.	Wales (Note: Wrexham play in the English football league system.)	3	2022–23: National League (V) – 1st 2023–24: League Two (IV) – 2nd 2024–25: League One (III) – 2nd	
RBC	Netherlands	3	2022–23: Tweede Klasse (VII) – 1st 2023–24: Eerste Klasse (VI) – 1st 2024–25: Vierde Divisie (V) – 3rd (playoffs)	
Wieczysta Kraków	Poland	3	2023–24: III liga Group 4 (IV) – 1st 2024–25: II liga (III) – 3rd (playoffs) 2025–26: I liga (II) – 3rd (playoffs)	

=== Relegations ===
Clubs with three or more consecutive relegations:

Club	Country	No	Leagues	Ref
Achilles '29	The Netherlands	5	2016–17: Eerste Divisie (II) – 20th 2017–18: Tweede Divisie (III) – 18th 2018–19: Derde Divisie (IV) – 18th 2021–22: Hoofdklasse (V) – 16th (league was cancelled for two seasons due to the COVID-19 pandemic) 2022–23: Eerste Klasse (VI) – 12th	
F.C. Tirsense	Portugal	4	1995–96: Primeira Liga (I) – 18th 1996–97: Liga de Honra (II) – 18th 1997–98: Segunda Divisão (III) – 18th 1998–99: Terceira Divisão (IV) – 15th	
SV Lohhof	Germany	4	1999–2000: Regionalliga Süd (III) – 18th 2000–01: Bayernliga (IV) – 18th 2001–02: Landesliga Bayern-Süd (V) – 20th 2002–03: Bezirksoberliga Oberbayern (VI) – 18th	
FC Kempten	Germany	4	2007–08: Bayernliga (V) – 18th 2008–09: Landesliga Bayern-Süd (VI) – 14th 2009–10: Bezirksoberliga Schwaben (VII) – 17th 2010–11: Bezirksliga Schwaben-Süd (VIII) – 13th	
Vale of Leithen F.C.	Scotland	4	2021–22: Lowland Football League (V) – 18th 2022–23 East of Scotland Football League Premier Division (VI) – 16th 2023–24: East of Scotland Football League First Division (VII) – 15th 2024–25: East of Scotland Football League Second Division (VIII) – 14th	
KS Cracovia	Poland	3	1969–70: I liga (I) – 14th 1970–71: II liga (II) – 16th 1971–72: III liga gr. II (Kraków) (III) – 13th	
Bristol City F.C.	England	3	1979–80: Football League First Division (I) – 20th 1980–81: Football League Second Division (II) – 21st 1981–82: Football League Third Division (III) – 23rd	
Wolverhampton Wanderers F.C.	England	3	1983–84: Football League First Division (I) – 22nd 1984–85: Football League Second Division (II) – 22nd 1985–86: Football League Third Division (III) – 23rd	
AS Brest	France	3	1986–87: Division 3 (III) – 16th 1987–88: Division 4 (IV) – 14th 1988–89: Division d'Honneur (V) – 13th	
SpVgg Plattling	Germany	3	1993–94: Bayernliga (III) – 18th 1994–95: Landesliga Bayern-Mitte (V) – 16th 1995–96: Bezirksoberliga Niederbayern (VI) – 16th	
Luton Town F.C.	England	3	2006–07: Football League Championship (II) – 23rd 2007–08: Football League One (III) – 24th 2008–09: Football League Two (IV) – 24th	
SpVgg Au/Iller (Note: The club withdrew its team during the 2010–11 season and entered the tier nine Kreisliga Donau/Iller A 3 for the 2011–12 season)	Germany	3	2008–09: Oberliga Baden-Württemberg (V) – 17th 2009–10: Verbandsliga Württemberg (VI) – 16th 2010–11: Landesliga Württemberg 2 (VII) – 16th	
Ruch Chorzów	Poland	3	2016–17: Ekstraklasa (I) – 16th 2017–18: I liga (II) – 17th 2018–19: II liga (III) – 17th	
FC Dnipro	Ukraine	3	2016–17: Vyshcha Liha (I) – 11th, relegated two levels lower 2017–18 Ukrainian Second League (III) – 8th in Group B 2018–19: Ukrainian Amateur Football Championship (IV) – 8th in Group 3	
Shabab El Bourj SC	Lebanon	3	2021–22: Lebanese Premier League (I) – 11th 2022–23: Lebanese Second Division (II) – 12th 2023–24: Lebanese Third Division (III) – 6th in Group C	
Moreland City FC	Australia	3	2024: NPL Victoria (II) – 14th 2025: Victorian Premier League 1 (III) – 14th 2026: Victorian Premier League 2 (IV) – 14th	

=== Promotions and relegations ===
Yo-yo clubs, meaning clubs that consecutively bounce between two leagues and have, in the process, switched leagues five or more times:

Club	Country	No	Leagues	Ref
BFC Südring	Germany	10	1950–51: Oberliga Berlin (I) – 14th 1951–52: Amateurliga Berlin (II) – 2nd 1952–53: Oberliga Berlin (I) – 11th 1953–54: Amateurliga Berlin (II) – 1st 1954–55: Oberliga Berlin (I) – 11th 1955–56: Amateurliga Berlin (II) – 1st 1956–57: Oberliga Berlin (I) – 11th 1957–58: Amateurliga Berlin (II) – 2nd 1958–59: Oberliga Berlin (I) – 11th 1959–60: Amateurliga Berlin (II) – 2nd	
Aris Limassol FC	Cyprus	10	1996–97: Cypriot First Division (I) – 12th 1997–98: Cypriot Second Division (II) 1998–99: Cypriot First Division (I) – 14th 1999–2000: Cypriot Second Division (II) 2000–01: Cypriot First Division (I) – 14th 2001–02: Cypriot Second Division (II) 2002–03: Cypriot First Division (I) – 13th 2003–04: Cypriot Second Division (II) 2004–05: Cypriot First Division (I) – 14th 2005–06: Cypriot Second Division (II)	
FC Kuressaare	Estonia	9	2001: Meistriliiga (I) – 8th 2002: Esiliiga (II) – 2nd 2003: Meistriliiga (I) – 8th 2004: Esiliiga (II) – 5th 2005: Meistriliiga (I) – 9th 2006: Esiliiga (II) – 2nd 2007: Meistriliiga (I) – 9th 2008: Esiliiga (II) – 2nd 2009: Meistriliiga (I) – 8th	
SK Brann	Norway	8	1979: 1. divisjon (I) – 12th 1980: 2. divisjon (II) 1981: 1. divisjon (I) – 10th 1982: 2. divisjon (II) 1983: 1. divisjon (I) – 10th 1984: 2. divisjon (II) 1985: 1. divisjon (I) – 11th 1986: 2. divisjon (II)	
Deportivo de La Coruña	Spain	7	1961–62: Segunda División (II) – 1st 1962–63: La Liga (I) – 14th 1963–64: Segunda División (II) – 1st 1964–65: La Liga (I) – 16th 1965–66: Segunda División (II) – 1st 1966–67: La Liga (I) – 16th 1967–68: Segunda División (II) – 1st	
Hong Kong FC	Hong Kong	7	1972–73: Second Division League (II) 1973–74: First Division League (I) – 14th 1974–75: Second Division League (II) 1975–76: First Division League (I) – 12th 1976–77: Second Division League (II) 1977–78: First Division League (I) – 12th 1978–79: Second Division League (II)	
Drogheda United F.C.	Ireland	7	1993–94: Premier Division (I) – 12th 1994–95: First Division (II) – 2nd 1995–96: Premier Division (I) – 11th 1996–97: First Division (II) – 2nd 1997–98: Premier Division (I) – 12th 1998–99: First Division (II) – 1st 1999–2000: Premier Division (I) – 12th	
Rotherham United F.C.	England	6	2016–17: EFL Championship (II) – 24th 2017–18: EFL League One (III) – 4th 2018–19: EFL Championship (II) – 22nd 2019–20: EFL League One (III) – 2nd 2020–21: EFL Championship (II) – 23rd 2021–22: EFL League One (III) – 2nd	
TSG Weinheim	Germany	6	1998–99: Verbandsliga Nordbaden (V) – 1st 1999–2000: Oberliga Baden-Württemberg (IV) – 15th 2000–01: Verbandsliga Nordbaden (V) – 1st 2001–02: Oberliga Baden-Württemberg (IV) – 15th 2002–03: Verbandsliga Nordbaden (V) – 1st 2003–04: Oberliga Baden-Württemberg (IV) – 18th	
Valur	Iceland	6	1999: Urvalsdeild (I) – 9th 2000: 1. deild (II) – 2nd 2001: Urvalsdeild (I) – 9th 2002: 1. deild (II) – 1st 2003: Urvalsdeild (I) – 10th 2004: 1. deild (II) – 1st	
SV Linx	Germany	6	2002–03: Verbandsliga Südbaden (V) – 1st 2003–04: Oberliga Baden-Württemberg (IV) – 16th 2004–05: Verbandsliga Südbaden (V) – 1st 2005–06: Oberliga Baden-Württemberg (IV) – 18th 2006–07: Verbandsliga Südbaden (V) – 1st 2007–08:Oberliga Baden-Württemberg (IV) – 18th	
Avaí FC	Brazil	6	2014: Série B (II) – 4th 2015: Série A (I) – 17th 2016: Série B (II) – 2nd 2017: Série A (I) – 18th 2018: Série B (II) – 3rd 2019: Série A (I) – 20th	
Heart of Midlothian F.C.	Scotland	5	1976–77: Scottish Premier Division (I) –9th 1977–78: Scottish First Division (II) – 2nd 1978–79: Scottish Premier Division (I) – 9th 1979–80: Scottish First Division (II) – 1st 1980–81: Scottish Premier Division (I) – 10th	
Odra Opole	Poland	5	1983–1984: II liga group 1 (II) – 13th 1984–1985: III liga group. 5 (III) – 1st 1985–1986: II liga group 1 (II) – 14th 1986–1987: III liga group 5 (III) – 1st 1987–1988: II liga group 1 (II) – 13th (relegated after play-outs)	
U.S. Cremonese	Italy	5	1988–89: Serie B (II) 1989–90: Serie A (I) 1990–91: Serie B (II) 1991–92: Serie A (I) 1992–93: Serie B (II)	
1. FC Köln	Germany	5	2001–02: Bundesliga (I) 2002–03: 2. Bundesliga (II) 2003–04: Bundesliga (I) 2004–05: 2. Bundesliga (II) 2005–06: Bundesliga (I)	
FC Zakarpattia Uzhhorod	Ukraine	5	2005–06: Vyshcha Liha (I) – 16th 2006–07 Ukrainian First League (II) – 2nd 2007–08: Vyshcha Liha (I) – 16th 2008–09 Ukrainian First League (II) – 1st 2009–10: Ukrainian Premier League (I) – 16th	
FC Kuban Krasnodar	Russia	5	2006: National League (II) – 2nd 2007: Premier League (I) – 15th 2008: National League (II) – 2nd 2009: Premier League (I) – 15th 2010: National League (II) – 1st	
Fulham F.C.	England	5	2017–18: EFL Championship (II) – 3rd 2018–19 Premier League (I) – 19th 2019–20: EFL Championship (II) – 4th 2020–21: Premier League (I) – 18th 2021–22: EFL Championship (II) – 1st	
Burnley F.C.	England	5	2021–22: Premier League (I) – 18th 2022–23: EFL Championship (II) – 1st 2023–24: Premier League (I) – 19th 2024–25: EFL Championship (II) – 2nd 2025–26: Premier League (I) – 19th	

=== Promotions and/or relegations ===
Clubs with four or more consecutive promotions and/or relegations, spread over three or more divisions:

Club	Country	No	Leagues	Ref
RC Celta de Vigo	Spain	9	1974–75: La Liga (I) – 17th ↓ 1975–76: Segunda División (II) – 2nd ↑ 1976–77: La Liga (I) – 17th ↓ 1977–78: Segunda División (II) – 2nd ↑ 1978–79: La Liga (I) – 16th ↓ 1979–80: Segunda División (II) – 17th ↓ 1980–81: Segunda División B Grupo I (III) – 1st ↑ 1981–82: Segunda División (II) – 1st ↑ 1982–83: La Liga (I) – 17th ↓	
UMF Sindri Höfn	Iceland	8	1996: 3. deild (IV) – ↑ 1997: 2. deild (III) – 10th ↓ 1998: 3. deild (IV) – ↑ 1999: 2. deild (III) – 2nd ↑ 2000: 1. deild (II) – 9th ↓ 2001: 2. deild (III) – 2nd ↑ 2002: 1. deild (II) – 10th ↓ 2003: 2. deild (III) – 9th ↓	
FC Kempten	Germany	7	2004–05: Landesliga Bayern-Süd (VI) – 2nd ↑ 2005–06: Bayernliga (IV) – 16th ↓ 2006–07: Landesliga Bayern-Süd (VI) – 1st ↑ 2007–08: Bayernliga (IV) – 18th ↓ 2008–09: Landesliga Bayern-Süd (VI) – 14th ↓ 2009–10: Bezirksoberliga Schwaben (VII) – 17th ↓ 2010–11: Bezirksliga Schwaben-Süd (VIII) – 13th ↓	
Comercial Futebol Clube (RP)	Brazil	7	2009: Campeonato Paulista Série A2 (VI) – 18th ↓ 2010: Campeonato Paulista Série A3 (VII) – 5th ↑ 2011: Campeonato Paulista Série A2 (VI) – 4th ↑ 2012: Campeonato Paulista (V) – 20th ↓ 2013: Campeonato Paulista Série A2 (VI) – 4th ↑ 2014: Campeonato Paulista (V) – 17th ↓ 2015: Campeonato Paulista Série A2 (VI) – 17th ↓	
Wimbledon	England	6	1978–79: Football League Fourth Division (IV) – 3rd ↑ 1979–80: Football League Third Division (III) – 24th ↓ 1980–81: Football League Fourth Division (IV) – 4th ↑ 1981–82: Football League Third Division (III) – 21st ↓ 1982–83: Football League Fourth Division (IV) – 1st ↑ 1983–84: Football League Third Division (III) – 2nd ↑	
Gazélec Ajaccio	France	6	2010–11: Championnat de France amateur (IV) – 1st ↑ 2011–12:Championnat National (III) – 3rd ↑ 2012–13: Ligue 2 (II) – 20th ↓ 2013–14: Championnat National (III) – 3rd ↑ 2014–15: Ligue 2 (II) – 2nd ↑ 2015–16 Ligue 1 (I) – 19th ↓	
IF Brommapojkarna	Sweden	6	2014: Allsvenskan (I) –16th ↓ 2015: Superettan (II) – 16th ↓ 2016: Division 1 Norra (III) – 1st ↑ 2017: Superettan (II) – 1st ↑ 2018: Allsvenskan (I) – 14th (relegated after play-outs) ↓ 2019: Superettan (II) – 15th ↓	
F.C. Tirsense	Portugal	5	1995–96: Primeira Liga (I) – 18th ↓ 1996–97: Liga de Honra (II) – 18th ↓ 1997–98: Segunda Divisão (III) – 18th ↓ 1998–99: Terceira Divisão (IV) – 15th ↓ 1999–2000: Divisão de Honra da AF Porto (V) – 1st ↑	
Manchester City	England	5	1997–98: Football League First Division (II) – 22nd ↓ 1998–99: Football League Second Division (III) – 3rd ↑ 1999–2000: Football League First Division(II) – 1st ↑ 2000–01: Premier League (I) – 18th ↓ 2001–02: Football League First Division (II) – 1st ↑	
RCD Mallorca	Spain	5	2016–17: Segunda División (II) – 20th ↓ 2017–18: Segunda División B (III) – 1st ↑ 2018–2019: Segunda División(II) – 5th ↑ 2019–20: La Liga (I) – 19th ↓ 2020–21: Segunda División (II) – 2nd ↑	
FC Obolon Kyiv	Ukraine	4	1998–99: Ukrainian Second League (III) – 1st in Group C ↑ 1999–2000: Ukrainian First League (II) – 16th ↓ 2000–01: Ukrainian Second League (III) – 1st in Group B ↑ 2001–02: Ukrainian First League (II) – 3rd ↑	
Esporte Clube Vitória	Brazil	4	2004: Série A (I) – 23rd ↓ 2005: Série B (II) – 17th ↓ 2006: Série C (III) – 2nd ↑ 2007: Série B (II) – 4th ↑	
América Futebol Clube (RN)	Brazil	4	2004: Série B (II) – 19th ↓ 2005: Série C (III) – 2nd ↑ 2006: Série B (II) – 4th ↑ 2007: Série A (I) – 20th ↓	
Gretna F.C.	Scotland	4	2004–05: Scottish Third Division (IV) – 1st ↑ 2005–06: Scottish Second Division (III) – 1st ↑ 2006–07: Scottish First Division (II) – 1st ↑ 2007–08: Scottish Premier League (I) – 12th ↓	
Esporte Clube Água Santa	Brazil	4	2013: Campeonato Paulista Segunda Divisão (VIII) – 2nd ↑ 2014: Campeonato Paulista Série A3 (VII) – 4th ↓ 2015: Campeonato Paulista Série A2 (VI) – 4th ↑ 2016: Campeonato Paulista (V) – 15th ↓	
Al Shabab Al Arabi Club Beirut	Lebanon	4	2015–16: Lebanese Third Division (III) – 2nd ↑ 2016–17: Lebanese Second Division (II) – 1st ↑ 2017–18: Lebanese Premier League (I) –11th ↓ 2018–19: Lebanese Second Division (II) – 11th ↓	
Centro Sportivo Alagoano	Brazil	4	2016: Série D (IV) – 2nd ↑ 2017: Série C (III) – 1st ↑ 2018: Série B (II) – 2nd ↑ 2019: Série A (I) – 18th ↓	
Leicester City F.C	England	4	2022–23: Premier League (I) – 18th ↓ 2023–24: EFL Championship (II) – 1st ↑ 2024–25: Premier League (I) – 18th ↓ 2025–26: EFL Championship (II) – 23rd ↓	
Ipswich Town F.C	England	4	2022–23: EFL League One (III) – 2nd ↑ 2023–24: EFL Championship (II) – 2nd ↑ 2024–25: Premier League (I) – 19th ↓ 2025–26: EFL Championship (II) – 2nd ↑	
