= Abdul Razzak Dakramanji =

Lebanese footballer (born 2001)

Personal information
- Full name: Abdul Razzak Talal Dakramanji
- Date of birth: 22 February 2001 (age 25)
- Place of birth: Tripoli, Lebanon
- Position: Full-back

Team information
- Current team: Tripoli
- Number: 19

Senior career*
| Years | Team | Apps | (Gls) |
| 2020– | Tripoli | 94 | (1) |

International career^{‡}
| 2019 | Lebanon U19 | 3 | (1) |
| 2022 | Lebanon U23 | 2 | (0) |
| 2023 | Lebanon | 3 | (0) |
- * Club domestic league appearances and goals as of 13 September 2026 ‡ National team caps and goals as of 28 June 2023

Abdul Razzak Talal Dakramanji (Arabic: عبد الرزاق طلال دكرمنجي; born 22 February 2001) is a Lebanese footballer who plays as a full-back for Lebanese Premier League club Tripoli.

== Club career ==
Dakramanji made his Lebanese Premier League debut for Tripoli during the 2020–21 season. On 9 January 2022, Dakramanji scored his first league goal in the 90+3rd minute against Sporting in a 3–0 win. On 20 April 2024, Dakramanji scored a crucial goal against Ahly Nabatieh, in the match that ended 1–0, enabling Tripoli to secure their spot in the semi-finals of the Lebanese FA Cup.

== International career ==
Dakramanji represented Lebanon at under-19 and under-23 levels, playing for the U23 team at the 2023 WAFF Championship.

Dakramanji was first called up to the senior team in May 2023, for a training camp in Turkey. On 25 June 2023, he made his international senior debut in a 4–1 win against Bhutan in the 2023 SAFF Championship.

== Career statistics ==
=== International ===
As of match played 28 June 2023

Appearances and goals by national team and year
| National team | Year | Apps | Goals |
|---|---|---|---|
| Lebanon | 2023 | 3 | 0 |
| Total | | 3 | 0 |
