= Hassan Moghnieh =

Lebanese footballer (born 1986)

Personal information
- Full name: Hassan Abbas Moghnieh
- Date of birth: 7 February 1986 (age 40)
- Place of birth: Tayr Debba, Lebanon
- Height: 1.80 m (5 ft 11 in)
- Position: Goalkeeper

Team information
- Current team: Racing Beirut
- Number: 1

Youth career
- 2002–2007: Ansar

Senior career*
| Years | Team | Apps | (Gls) |
| 2007–2021 | Ansar | 98+ | (0) |
| 2021–2023 | Bourj | 17 | (0) |
| 2023–2024 | Chabab Ghazieh | 17 | (0) |
| 2025 | Bourj | 1 | (0) |
| 2025– | Racing Beirut | 1 | (0) |

International career
| 2007 | Lebanon U23 | | |
| 2008–2012 | Lebanon | 5 | (0) |
- * Club domestic league appearances and goals as of 25 July 2026

Hassan Abbas Moghnieh (Arabic: حسن عباس مغنية, born 7 February 1986) is a Lebanese footballer who plays as a goalkeeper for Lebanese Second Division club Racing Beirut.

== Club career ==
Moghnieh joined the Ansar youth team on 28 October 2002; he has won a league title and three Lebanese FA Cups with the team. On 12 July 2021, Moghnieh joined Bourj. He moved to Chabab Ghazieh in June 2023 and helped the club secure its place in the first division.

== International career ==
Moghnieh was the first-choice goalkeeper in the Lebanese Olympic team that attempted to qualify for the 2008 Summer Olympics in Beijing, China.

== Honours ==
Ansar

- Lebanese Premier League: 2020–21
- Lebanese FA Cup: 2011–12, 2016–17, 2020–21
- Lebanese Super Cup: 2012

Bourj

- Lebanese Challenge Cup: 2021
