= Salih Sadir =

Iraqi footballer

Personal information
- Full name: Salih Sadir Salih Al-Sadoun
- Date of birth: 21 August 1981 (age 45)
- Place of birth: Najaf, Iraq
- Height: 1.75 m (5 ft 9 in)
- Positions: Attacking midfielder; second striker

Youth career
- Al-Najaf

Senior career*
Years	Team	Apps	(Gls)
1999–2003	Al-Najaf		(10)
2003–2004	Al-Talaba		(0)
2004–2005	Zamalek	11	(2)
2005–2008	Ansar	57	(30)
2008–2009	Ahed	20	(27)
2009–2010	Rah Ahan	5	(1)
2010–2011	Safa	3	(0)
2011	Paykan	12	(2)
2011–2012	Al-Najaf		(3)
2012	Erbil		(0)
2012–2013	Duhok		(11)
2013–2014	Zakho		(0)
2014	Al-Zawraa		(1)
2014–2015	Duhok		(2)
2015	Al-Talaba		(0)
2015–2017	Naft Al-Wasat		(10)
2017–2018	Al-Mina'a		(2)
2018	Al-Quwa Al-Jawiya		(2)
2018–2019	Naft Al-Wasat		(6)
2019–2020	Al-Najaf		(1)
Total			(110)

International career
2002–2012	Iraq	56	(7)
Medal record
Men's football
Representing Iraq
AFC Asian Cup
Winner	2007 Indonesia/Malaysia/ Thailand/Vietnam
- * Club domestic league appearances and goals

Salih Sadir Salih Al-Sadoun (Arabic: صَالِح سُدَيْر صَالِح السَّعْدُون; born 21 August 1981) is an Iraqi former professional footballer who played as an attacking midfielder.

Previously, Sadir played with Rah Ahan and Paykan in the Persian Gulf Pro League. He also played for the Iraq national football team between 2002 and 2011. He has two younger brothers, Ayad and Qaed, both also footballers.

== Club career ==
Sadir started his playing career with Nasour Al-Jumhuriya before joining Najaf FC where he progressed through the youth ranks under coach Zuhair Khadim. In 1999, he was promoted into the first team by Najih Hemoud and became a regular. Under coach Hemoud, Najaf FC became one of Iraq's most entertaining teams with Saleh Sadeer – and captain Falah Hassan, Abbas Wahoudi, Saeed Muhsin, Ali Hashim and Qasim Jalout.

In 2003 after the war, he moved to Al-Talaba where he made several outstanding performances in the Arab Champions League – which earned him a move to Egyptian giants Zamalek SC for next season. After playing one season with Zamalek SC, he joined Lebanon league champions Al-Ansar where he helped them to two consecutive Lebanon league titles. Sadir moved to Zakho on 14 September 2013.

On 11 February 2022, Sadir announced his retirement from football.

== International career ==
Sadir played for the Olympic team in the qualifying rounds – his performances compensated for the absence of Nashat Akram in Iraq's midfield. Before the war, he was named one of the two best players in the 2003–04 season by an Iraqi FA panel and became a regular in Stange's Olympic squad making his debut in the 2–1 defeat to Qatar in the former Oman and Perth Glory coach's first game in charge of Iraq. Saleh Sadeer was one of Bernd Stange's favourite players when the German first arrived in Iraq. He scored an important goal in the 1–1 draw with Vietnam in Hanoi that helped Iraq to progress to the second round.

== Career statistics ==
=== International ===
Scores and results list Iraq's goal tally first, score column indicates score after each Sadir goal.

List of international goals scored by Salih Sadir
No.	Date	Venue	Opponent	Score	Result	Competition	Ref.
1	8 September 2004	Zhongshan Soccer Stadium, Taipei, Taiwan	Chinese Taipei	1–0	4–1	2006 FIFA World Cup qualification	
2	8 September 2004	Zhongshan Soccer Stadium, Taipei, Taiwan	Chinese Taipei	2–0	4–1	2006 FIFA World Cup qualification	
3	3 December 2004	Al-Maktoum Stadium, Dubai, United Arab Emirates	Yemen	2–1	3–1	Friendly	
4	25 July 2006	Abbasiyyin Stadium, Damascus, Syria	Syria	2–0	2–1	Friendly	
5	6 September 2006	Khalifa Bin Zayed Stadium, Al Ain, United Arab Emirates	Palestine	1–1	2–2	2007 AFC Asian Cup qualification	
6	22 June 2007	Amman International Stadium, Amman, Jordan	Syria	3–0	3–0	2007 WAFF Championship	
7	24 June 2007	Amman International Stadium, Amman, Jordan	Iran	1–2	1–2	2007 WAFF Championship	

== Honours ==
Ansar

- Lebanese Premier League: 2005–06, 2006–07
- Lebanese FA Cup: 2005–06, 2006–07

Ahed

- Lebanese FA Cup: 2008–09

Iraq

- AFC Asian Cup: 2007

Individual

- Lebanese Premier League Best Player: 2006–07, 2007–08, 2008–09
- Lebanese Premier League Player of the Week: 2008–09
- Lebanese Premier League Team of the Season: 2006–07, 2007–08, 2008–09
- Lebanese Premier League top scorer: 2008–09
