= 2025–26 Lebanese Second Division =

Lebanese Second Division
- Season: 2025–26
- Dates: 3 October 2025 – 26 July 2026
- Champions: Akhaa Ahli Aley
- Promoted: Akhaa Ahli Aley; Tripoli
- Relegated: Okhwa Kharayeb; BFA Sporting
- Matches: 128
- Goals: 225 (1.76 per match)
- Top goalscorer: Samuel Afolabi (22 goals)

The Lebanese Second Division (Arabic: الدوري اللبناني الدرجة الثانية) is the second division of Lebanese football. It is controlled by the Lebanese Football Association. The top two teams are promoted to the Lebanese Premier League, while teams finishing at the bottom of the competition are relegated to the Lebanese Third Division.

== Summary ==
The 2025–26 season began on 3 October 2025. Twelve clubs were initially scheduled to participate, but Okhwa Kharayeb withdrew before the start of the competition because of financial difficulties, leaving 11 teams to compete.

The 11 participating teams played 20 matches each in the regular season. Tripoli finished first with 48 points, followed by Salam Zgharta, Akhaa Ahli Aley and Rissala Toura. The competition was then divided into a promotion playoff involving the top four teams and a relegation playoff involving the bottom three, while the teams that finished fifth through eighth completed their seasons after the regular season.

Akhaa Ahli Aley won the promotion playoff with 34 points and were crowned champions, while Tripoli finished second with 30 points. Both clubs were therefore promoted to the Lebanese Premier League. Shabab Baalbeck and BFA Sporting finished in the bottom two positions of the relegation playoff and were relegated to the Lebanese Third Division.

The final round of the competition was played in July 2026. In the decisive final match on 26 July, Tripoli defeated Salam Zgharta 1–0 to secure promotion, while Akhaa Ahli Aley defeated Rissala Toura 5–0 to win the title.

Samuel Afolabi of Salam Zgharta finished as the league's top scorer with 22 goals.

== League table ==
Pos	Team	Pld	W	D	L	GF	GA	GD	Pts	Promotion or relegation (Note: The 12 registered teams were scheduled to play each other twice. After Okhwa Kharayeb withdrew, the remaining 11 teams played 20 matches each. The league then split into three groups: the top four entered the promotion round, the bottom three entered the relegation round, and teams finishing fifth through eighth completed their seasons. The top four played six additional matches each, while the bottom three played four additional matches each.)
1	Akhaa Ahli Aley (C, P)	26	17	3	6	46	29	+17	34	Promotion to Lebanese Premier League
2	Tripoli (P)	26	16	6	4	57	19	+38	30 (Note: Head-to-head points: Tripoli 8, Salam Zgharta 2.)	Promotion to Lebanese Premier League
3	Salam Zgharta	26	16	4	6	60	35	+25	30	
4	Rissala Toura	26	13	4	9	51	46	+5	25	
5	Ahli Nabatieh	20	9	4	7	20	23	−3	31	
6	Hilal Nasr	20	8	5	7	31	30	+1	29	
7	Ittihad Haret Al Naameh	20	7	3	10	21	27	−6	24	
8	Chabab Ghazieh	20	6	3	11	23	28	−5	21	
9	Irshad Chehim	24	6	4	14	29	54	−25	15	
10	Shabab Baalbek	24	5	6	13	27	38	−11	13	
11	BFA Sporting (R)	24	1	6	17	23	59	−36	7	Relegation to Lebanese Third Division
12	Okhwa Kharayeb (Note: Okhwa Kharayeb withdrew and did not play a match.) (R)	0	0	0	0	0	0	0	0	Withdraw

Source: Global Sports Archive
Rules for classification: 1) Points; 2) Head-to-head points; 3) Head-to-head goal difference; 4) Goal difference; 5) Goals scored; 6) Fair play points; 7) Draw.
(C) Champions; (P) Promoted; (R) Relegated

== Goalscorers ==
Rank	Player	Club	Goals
1	(Nigeria) Samuel Afolabi	Salam Zgharta	22
2	(Lebanon) Mohammad El Saleh	Tripoli	14
3	(Senegal) Baba Cissé	Akhaa Ahli Aley	10
3	(Lebanon) Akram Moghrabi	Salam Zgharta	10
3	(Ghana) Bismark Asante	Salam Zgharta	10
6	(Lebanon) Ali Alhadi Reda	Rissala Toura	9
6	(Lebanon) Khaled Takaji	Tripoli	9
6	(Ghana) Patrick Arthur	Irshad Chehim	9
6	(Lebanon) Fouad Eid	Tripoli	9
10	(Senegal) Ibrahima Khalil Gueyé	Rissala Toura	7
10	(Lebanon) Ceasar Abi Shakra	Hilal Nasr	7
10	(Lebanon) Daniel Abou Fakher	Ahli Nabatieh	7
10	(Lebanon) Ali El Outa	Shabab Baalbek	7
