= 2016–17 Lebanese Second Division =

Lebanese Second Division
- Season: 2016–17
- Champions: Al-Shabab Al Arabi
- Promoted: Al-Shabab Al Arabi; Al Islah B.H.
- Relegated: Al-Riadah wal Adab; Al-Shabeba Al-Mazraah
- Matches played: 132
- Goals scored: 386 (2.92 per match)
- Biggest home win: Al-Shabab Al Arabi 4-0 Nasr Brasilia; Hekmeh 4-0 Amal Maarka F.C. Hekmeh 4-0 Nasr Brasilia
- Biggest away win: Hekmeh 0-5 Homenetmen Beirut F.C.
- Highest scoring: Hekmeh 3-6 Al Islah B.H.

The Lebanese Second Division (Arabic: الدوري اللبناني - الدرجة الثانية) is the second division of Lebanese football. It is controlled by the Federation Libanaise de Football Association. The top two teams qualify for the Lebanese Premier League and replace the relegated teams.

== Table ==
=== League table ===
Pos	Team	Pld	W	D	L	GF	GA	GD	Pts	Promotion or relegation
1	Al-Shabab Al Arabi (P)	22	15	4	3	42	13	+29	49	Promotion to Lebanese Premier League
2	Al Islah B.H. (P)	22	13	7	2	44	23	+21	46	Promotion to Lebanese Premier League
3	Shabab Al-Ghazieh	22	13	4	5	47	25	+22	43	
4	Al-Mabarrah	22	12	1	9	31	27	+4	37	
5	Homenetmen Beirut F.C.	22	8	6	8	36	31	+5	30	
6	Nasr Brasilia	22	8	4	10	24	32	−8	28	
7	Al Ahli Nabatiya	22	6	9	7	17	21	−4	27	
8	Al-Ahli Saida	22	6	7	9	34	32	+2	25	
9	Hekmeh	22	7	3	12	31	45	−14	24	
10	Amal Maarka F.C.	22	5	7	10	26	40	−14	22	
11	Al-Shabeba Al-Mazraah (R)	22	4	6	12	23	45	−22	18	Relegation to Lebanese Third Division
12	Al-Riadah wal Adab (Note: Had 6 points deducted) (R)	22	5	2	15	31	51	−20	11	Relegation to Lebanese Third Division

Updated to match(es) played on 20 may 2018. Source:
Rules for classification: 1) Points; 2) Goal difference; 3) Number of goals scored
(P) Promoted; (R) Relegated
