= 2015–16 Lebanese Second Division =

Lebanese Second Division
- Season: 2015–16
- Champions: Tadamon Sour
- Promoted: Tadamon Sour; Al-Akhaa Al-Ahli Aley
- Relegated: Al-Ommal Trables; Hilal Haret el Nehme
- Matches: 132
- Goals: 445 (3.37 per match)
- Biggest home win: Tadamon Sour 10-0 Al-Ommal Trables
- Biggest away win: Al-Riadah wal Adab 0-9 Al Islah B.H.
- Highest scoring: Al Islah B.H. 5-5 Al-Riadah wal Adab; Tadamon Sour 10-0 Al-Ommal Trables

The Lebanese Second Division (Arabic: الدوري اللبناني - الدرجة الثانية) is the second division of Lebanese football. It is controlled by the Federation Libanaise de Football Association. The top two teams qualify for the Lebanese Premier League and replace the relegated teams.

== Table ==
=== League table ===
Pos	Team	Pld	W	D	L	GF	GA	GD	Pts	Promotion or relegation
1	Tadamon Sour (P)	22	21	1	0	75	9	+66	64	Promotion to Lebanese Premier League
2	Al-Akhaa Al-Ahli Aley (P)	22	16	2	4	52	18	+34	50	Promotion to Lebanese Premier League
3	Al-Mabarrah	22	12	4	6	42	26	+16	40	
4	Homenetmen Beirut F.C.	22	10	3	9	44	30	+14	33	
5	Al Ahli Nabatiya	22	9	6	7	34	26	+8	33	
6	Amal Maarka F.C.	22	8	6	8	37	45	−8	30	
7	Al Islah B.H.	22	7	8	7	42	34	+8	29	
8	Al-Ahli SC	22	6	5	11	26	36	−10	23	
9	Al-Riadah wal Adab	22	6	5	11	28	47	−19	23	
10	Al-Shabeba Al-Mazraah	22	6	4	12	24	41	−17	22	
11	Al-Ommal Trables (R)	22	6	3	13	25	57	−32	21	Relegation to Lebanese Third Division
12	Hilal Haret el Nehme (R)	22	0	3	19	13	73	−60	3	Relegation to Lebanese Third Division

Updated to match(es) played on 19 April 2016. Source:
Rules for classification: 1) Points; 2) Goal difference; 3) Number of goals scored
(P) Promoted; (R) Relegated
