= 2007–08 Lebanese Second Division =

Lebanese Second Division
- Season: 2007–08
- Champions: Salam Zgharta
- Promoted: Salam Zgharta; Shabab Al-Ghazieh
- Relegated: Riyadi Al-Abbasieh; Al Rayyan Beirut

The 2007–08 Lebanese Second Division was the 74th season of the Second Division league which featured 14 clubs. Two of these teams were eligible for promotion to the top league of Lebanese football, the Lebanese Premier League, while two of the 14 teams had to face relegation to the Lebanese Third Division for the 2007–08 Season.

Salam Zgharta and Shabab Al-Ghazieh were promoted to the Lebanese Premier League, having finished respectively in first and second place.
