= Al Rayyan SC Sarafand =

Lebanese football club

Rayyan Sarafand
- Full name: Al Rayyan Sporting Club Sarafand
- League: Lebanese Third Division
- 2025–26: Lebanese Fourth Division South – Group A, 1st of 8 (promoted via play-offs)

Al Rayyan Sporting Club Sarafand (Arabic: نادي الريان الرياضي الصرفند) is a football club based in Sarafand, Sidon District, Lebanon, that competes in the Lebanese Third Division.

== History ==
In 2003–04, Rayyan gained promotion from the Lebanese Second Division; they finished eighth in the 2004–05 Lebanese Premier League, and avoided relegation on head-to-head results with Sagesse. After finishing ninth in 2005–06, avoiding relegation by one place, Rayyan were relegated back to the Second Division, after they finished in 11th, below Tripoli on head-to-head results.

In 2026, Rayyan were promoted to the Third Division via play-offs.
