= Ansar Al Mawadda SC =

Association football club in Lebanon

Ansar Mawadda
- Full name: Ansar Al Mawadda Sporting Club
- Founded: 1968; 57 years ago (as Racing Hazmieh); 2005; 20 years ago (as Al Shabab Al Arabi Club Beirut); 2019; 6 years ago (as Ansar Al Mawadda SC)
- League: Lebanese Fourth Division
- 2023–24: Lebanese Third Division Group 2, 6th of 6 (relegated via play-offs)

Ansar Al Mawadda Sporting Club (Arabic: نادي انصار المودة الرياضي) is a football club based in Tabbaneh, a district in Tripoli, Lebanon, that competes in the Lebanese Fourth Division and is primarily supported by the Druze community.

Established in 1968 as Racing Hazmieh (Arabic: راسينغ حازمية), the club's licence was bought by Al Shabab Al Arabi Club Beirut (Arabic: نادي الشباب العربي بيروت) in 2005, before changing their name to Ansar Al Mawadda in 2019. Their first and only participation in the Lebanese Premier League was in the 2017–18 season, having won the 2016–17 Lebanese Second Division.

== History ==
Founded in 1968 as Racing Hazmieh (Arabic: راسينغ حازمية), in 2005 Al Shabab Al Arabi Club Beirut (Arabic: نادي الشباب العربي بيروت) bought the licence of the former club. In 2010 they won the Lebanese Fourth Division title, moving to the Third Division. In 2016, they moved to the Second Division and the following year they promoted to the Lebanese Premier League for the first time in their history. Their stay didn't last long, as in 2018 they were relegated back to the Second Division, before being relegated the following year to the Third Division.

In 2019, the club was purchased by Al Ansar FC president Nabil Badr, who transferred the team from Beirut to Tripoli and renamed it Ansar Al Mawadda Sporting Club (Arabic: نادي انصار المودة الرياضي).

== Honours ==
- Lebanese Second Division
  - Winners (1): 2016–17

== See also ==
- List of football clubs in Lebanon
- List of association football clubs with multiple consecutive promotions or relegations
