= BFA Sporting =

Lebanese football club

- Full name: BFA Sporting
- Short name: Sporting
- Founded: 23 October 1963; 62 years ago, as Al Jihad SC
- Ground: Rafic Hariri Stadium
- Capacity: 5,000
- Chairman: Joseph Bacha
- Manager: Rami El-Ladki
- League: Lebanese Third Division
- 2025–26: Lebanese Second Division, 11th of 12 (relegated)
- Website: sportingbeirut.com
Home colours	Away colours

BFA Sporting (Arabic: بي اف اي سبورتينغ), or simply Sporting, is a football club based in Beirut, Lebanon, that competes in the Lebanese Third Division. The club was founded in 1963, and first competed in the Lebanese football league system in 1997.

BFA Sporting first competed in the Lebanese Premier League in 2021, having won the 2020–21 Lebanese Second Division. In 2023, they entered into a partnership with Beirut Football Academy.

== History ==
=== Al Jihad SC ===
On 23 October 1963, Al Jihad SC (Arabic: نادي الجهاد الرياضي), based in Hay El Sellom, a district in Beirut, was formally recognized as a non-profit sports and cultural organization. They played their first official season in 1997, in the Lebanese Fifth Division, which they won in 1999–2000. In 2007–08 they won the Lebanese Third Division, and were promoted to the Lebanese Second Division.

=== Al Khoyol FC ===
On 2 September 2009, the club relocated to Ghobeiry, and changed their name to Al Khoyol FC (Arabic: نادي الخيول الرياضي).

In 2009–10, Khoyol lost a decisive match for promotion to the Lebanese Premier League against Akhaa Ahli Aley. The following season, in 2010–11, Khoyol lost to Ahli Saida in another decisive promotion match. In both instances, Khoyol complained to the Lebanese Football Association (LFA) for supposed match fixing.

In 2014, Khoyol were relegated to the Third Division.

=== Sporting ===
On 24 April 2018, the club changed their name to AC Sporting (Arabic: نادي سبورتينغ الرياضي) and moved to Beirut: they promptly gained promotion to the Lebanese Second Division in 2019, coming first in the Lebanese Third Division. Sporting won the 2020–21 Lebanese Second Division, and gained promotion to the Lebanese Premier League for the first time in their history. After finishing in last place, Sporting were relegated back to the Second Division.

On 26 June 2023, the club issued a statement announcing that it had been acquired by Australian-Lebanese businessman Joseph Bacha, owner of Telford Civil. They also entered into a partnership with Beirut Football Academy, and renamed the club to BFA Sporting (Arabic: بي اف اي سبورتينغ).

== Players ==
=== Current squad ===
As of 1 October 2022

Note: Flags indicate national team as defined under FIFA eligibility rules; some limited exceptions apply. Players may hold more than one non-FIFA nationality.

No.	Pos.	Nation	Player
4	DF	LBN	Jamil Merhi
5	DF	LBN	Francis
6	MF	LBN	Kassem Hnaino
7	FW	LBN	G Shammas
8	MF	LBN	Mohammad Zayyat
9	FW	LBN	Ali Abbas
10	FW	LBN	Ali Bazzi
11	FW	LBN	Zahreddine
14	MF	LBN	Ali Mezher
15	DF	LBN	Bilal Fakih
18	DF	PLE	Omar Meshlawi

No.	Pos.	Nation	Player
19	FW	LBN	Ali El Miri
20	DF	LBN	Hassan Fardous
21	FW	LBN	Christian Nawfal
22	MF	LBN	Yasser Dimachek
23	GK	LBN	Mahdi Mzanar
23	GK	LBN	Rizk
24	GK	LBN	Eddy Bashir
24	GK	LBN	A Nasser
25	DF	LBN	Hamza Mahmoud
30		LBN	Kawwam
77	MF	LBN	Issa Khreis
84	FW		C. Agibo

== Honours ==
- Lebanese Second Division
  - Winners (1): 2020–21
- Lebanese Third Division
  - Winners (1): 2018–19
- Lebanese Fifth Division
  - Winners (1): 1999–2000 (Note: As Al Jihad SC)

== See also ==
- List of football clubs in Lebanon
