= AC Tripoli =

Lebanese football club

Tripoli
- Full name: Tripoli Sporting Club
- Nickname: سفير الشمال (Ambassador of the North)
- Founded: Unknown, as Al Majd Sports Association; 4 April 2001; 25 years ago, as Olympic Beirut Sporting Club; 24 November 2005; 20 years ago, as Tripoli Sporting Club
- Ground: Tripoli Municipal Stadium
- Capacity: 22,000
- Chairman: Amin Al-Hoz
- Manager: Malek Hassoun
- League: Lebanese Premier League
- 2025–26: Lebanese Second Division, 2nd of 12 (promoted)
Home colours

Tripoli Sporting Club (Arabic: نادي طرابلس الرياضي), also known as AC Tripoli or simply Tripoli, is a football club based in Tripoli, Lebanon, that competes in the Lebanese Premier League, and is primarily supported by the Sunni Muslim community.

Founded as Al Majd Sports Association (Arabic: جمعية المجد الرياضي), the club was renamed Olympic Beirut Sporting Club (Arabic: نادي اولمبيك بيروت الرياضي) in 2001, winning the domestic double in the 2002–03 season. In 2005 they were re-established as AC Tripoli, and won a Lebanese FA Cup in 2014–15.

== History ==
=== Olympic Beirut ===
Founded as Al Majd Sports Association (Arabic: جمعية المجد الرياضي), the club was renamed Olympic Beirut Sporting Club (Arabic: نادي اولمبيك بيروت الرياضي) on 4 April 2001, by Taha Koleilat. In 2001–02 the club won the Lebanese Second Division, and were promoted to the Lebanese Premier League. Koleilat allocated a budget of US$7 million, with the goal of winning the league and building a competitive team for the AFC Cup. Having strengthened the team with the signings of Pierre Issa, Edílson, Faisal Antar, Youssef Mohamad, and Abbas Ali Atwi, among others, Olympic Beirut won the domestic double in 2002–03, winning both the league and FA Cup.

On 14 February 2003, Al Medina Bank – which funded the club's activities – declared bankruptcy. The decline was felt the following season, in 2003–04, with Olympic Beirut being knocked out of the 2004 AFC Cup in the quarter-finals against Singaporean club Home United, and finishing the league in third place. In 2004–05 Olympic Beirut finished in fourth place.

=== AC Tripoli ===
Prior to the 2005–06 season, Koleilat sold the club's license to former national team player Walid Kamareddine for $400,000, with the club being relocated to Tripoli. The club was first renamed Olympic, then Olympic Tripoli, and finally AC Tripoli (Arabic: نادي طرابلس الرياضي). The Lebanese Football Association (LFA) approved of the move on 24 November 2005.

In 2014–15 Tripoli won the Lebanese FA Cup, their first trophy under their new name. They participated in the 2016 AFC Cup where, after beating Kyrgyz club Alay Osh in the qualifying play-offs on penalty shoot-outs, they qualified to the group stage. Drawn in group B, Tripoli finished in third place out of four with two wins, a draw, and three defeats.

Starting from the 2016–17 season, Tripoli found themselves in financial issues due to Najib Mikati, the club's main funder, deciding to cut the club's salary year by year, leaving the club to rely on social donations and TV sponsorship payments. Tripoli were relegated to the Second Division in 2024, after finishing the 2023–24 Lebanese Premier League season in last place. They were promoted back to the Premier League after finishing second in the 2025–26 Second Division.

== Club rivalries ==
Tripoli plays the Tripoli derby with Egtmaaey, as they are both located in the same city. The club also contests the North derby with Salam Zgharta, also on the basis of location.

== Players ==
=== Current squad ===
As of 7 November 2026

Note: Flags indicate national team as defined under FIFA eligibility rules; some limited exceptions apply. Players may hold more than one non-FIFA nationality.

No.	Pos.	Nation	Player
2	DF	LBN	Mohamad Youssef Baalbaki
3	MF	SEN	El Hadji Ousmane Dione
4	DF	LBN	Nour Mansour
5	DF	LBN	Hassan Kraytem
6	MF	LBN	Ali Shaitou
7		LBN	Rami Iaali
9	FW	LBN	Fouad Eid
10	FW	LBN	Mohamad Omar Sadek
11	MF	LBN	Youssef Al Haj
13	FW	LBN	Akram Moghrabi
14	FW	GHA	Issah Akuka
15	DF	LBN	Abdul Razzak Dakramanji
16	DF	LBN	Shibriko
17	DF	LBN	Taha El Hussein
18		NGR	Lucky Vandi

No.	Pos.	Nation	Player
20	FW	LBN	Jawad Kawtharani
21	DF	LBN	Imad El Azame
23		LBN	Qoussay Mehtedi
29	FW	CIV	Bakary Soumaré
30	FW	LBN	Jason Bayeh
39	MF	LBN	Oussama Hussein
42	DF	CIV	Yves Constant Legré
55	DF	GHA	Michael Sefah
72	MF	NGR	Moses Enebi
90	GK	LBN	Bahaa El Abdallah
91	GK	LBN	Nazih Assaad
—	GK	LBN	Ahmad Darwich
—	GK	LBN	Charbel Antonio Zada
—		LBN	Abdelrahman El Masri

== Honours ==
- Lebanese Premier League
  - Winners (1): 2002–03 (Note: As Olympic Beirut)
- Lebanese FA Cup
  - Winners (2): 2002–03, 2014–15
  - Runners-up (2): 2004–05, 2013–14
- Lebanese Second Division
  - Winners (2): 2001–02, 2010–11
- Lebanese Challenge Cup (defunct)
  - Runners-up (1): 2021
- Lebanese Super Cup
  - Runners-up (1): 2015

== Performance in AFC competitions ==
- AFC Cup: 2 appearances

2004: Quarter-finals
2016: Group stage

== Managerial history ==
- (Lebanon) Ihsan Sayeed (1999–2002)
- (Brazil) Estevam Soares (2002)
- (Morocco) Mohammed Sahel (2002–2004)
- (Lebanon) Vardan Ghazaryan (2017)
- (Lebanon) Fadi Ayad (2018–2019)
- (Palestine) Ismael Kortam (2019)
- (Egypt) Ahmad Hafez (2019–2020)
- (Palestine) Ismael Kortam (2020)
- (Lebanon) Salim Mikati (2018–2021)
- (Iraq) Saad Jameel (2021)

== See also ==
- List of football clubs in Lebanon
