= Shabab El Bourj SC =

Association football club in Lebanon

Shabab Bourj
- Full name: Shabab El Bourj Sporting Club
- Founded: 1967; 59 years ago (as Al Irshad Sporting Club)
- Ground: Bourj el-Barajneh Stadium (Note: Only used as a training ground)
- Capacity: 1,500
- Chairman: Anwar Sleem
- Manager: Ghaithan El Saimali
- League: Lebanese Third Division
- 2025–26: Lebanese Fourth Division Mount Lebanon – Group D, 2nd of 7 (promoted via play-offs)
| Home colours | Away colours |

Shabab El Bourj Sporting Club (Arabic: نادي شباب البرج الرياضي, lit. 'Youth of the Tower Sporting Club') is a football club based in Bourj el-Barajneh, Beirut, Lebanon, that competes in the Lebanese Third Division. The club was founded in 1967 as Al Irshad SC, and changed their name to Shabab El Bourj SC in 2017.

== History ==
Founded in 1967 as Al Irshad SC, the club changed their name to Shabab El Bourj SC in 2017. They were promoted to the Lebanese Premier League for the first time under their new name in 2019, after gaining back to back promotions from the Fourth Division. They became the first Lebanese team to achieve this feat.

Following Shabab Bourj's failure to comply to FIFA's request for them to compensate former player Lorougnon Christ Remi, and rumours of a merger with Safa, the club withdrew from the league. On 30 May 2022, the LFA announced that Shabab Bourj were fined £L12.5 million, were relegated to the Second Division, and that all of their matches in the championship round were voided. Shabab Bourj eventually withdrew from the Second Division in 2022–23, and were relegated to the Third Division. In 2023–24, they were relegated to the Fourth Division. They won the Fourth Division Mount Lebanon title during the 2025–26 season, and were promoted to the Third Division via play-offs.

== Club rivalries ==
Shabab Bourj has rivalries with Bourj and Shabab Sahel, due to the fact that they are all based in the Dahieh area.

== Players ==
=== Current squad ===
As of 1 October 2022

Note: Flags indicate national team as defined under FIFA eligibility rules; some limited exceptions apply. Players may hold more than one non-FIFA nationality.

| No. | Pos. | Nation | Player |
|---|---|---|---|
| 1 | GK | LBN | Ali Ousseily |
| 2 | | LBN | Zeinabeddine Seifeddine |
| 3 | | LBN | Sharif Mezher |
| 4 | | LBN | Hassan Daaboul |
| 6 | | LBN | Abdelrahman Sous |
| 8 | | LBN | Ali Ismail |
| 9 | | LBN | Ali Bakri |
| 10 | | LBN | Ali Ibrahim |
| 11 | | LBN | Ali Hamdan |
| 12 | | LBN | Ali Sibai |
| 14 | | PLE | Bassam El Asmar |

| No. | Pos. | Nation | Player |
|---|---|---|---|
| 15 | | LBN | Nasser Hawi |
| 16 | | LBN | Khalil Mansour |
| 20 | | LBN | Mehdi Baydoun |
| 20 | | LBN | Ali Mansour |
| 22 | | LBN | Mehdi Karnabash |
| 30 | | LBN | Rami Hijazi |
| 33 | | LBN | Mohammad Saadeh |
| 70 | | LBN | Mohammad Ali Mortada |
| 70 | | LBN | Noureddine Naboulsi |
| 77 | | LBN | Ali Zbib |
| 88 | FW | LBN | Ali Chahla (captain) |

== Honours ==
- Lebanese Third Division
  - Winners (1): 1996–97 (Note: As Al Irshad SC)
- Lebanese Fourth Division
  - Winners (1): 2025–26 (Mount Lebanon)

== See also ==
- List of football clubs in Lebanon
- List of association football clubs with multiple consecutive promotions or relegations
