= Al Ijtimaii SC =

Lebanese football club

Ijtimaii
- Full name: Al Ijtimaii Sporting Club
- Founded: 1956; 70 years ago
- Ground: Tripoli Municipal Stadium
- Capacity: 12,000
- Manager: Bassam Asaad
- League: Lebanese Second Division
- 2025–26: Lebanese Third Division – Group B, 1st of 8 (promoted via play-offs)
Home colours

Al Ijtimaii Sporting Club (Arabic: نادي الإجتماعي الرياضي) is a football club based in Tripoli, Lebanon, that competes in the Lebanese Second Division.

Founded in 1956, Ijtimaii won three Lebanese Second Division titles, one Lebanese Third Division title, and reached the final of the Lebanese Challenge Cup twice.

== History ==
Ijtimaii was founded in 1956 and became Tripoli's most popular club. In 1991–92, the club won the Lebanese Second Division and were promoted to the Lebanese Premier League. They were relgated back to the Second Division after one season. After being relegated from the Second Division in 2005–06, Ijtimaii won the Lebanese Third Division in 2006–07.

In 2011–12, Ijtimaii won the Second Division, securing promotion to the Lebanese Premier League. The club reached the final of the inaugural Lebanese Challenge Cup in 2013, where it lost to Tadamon Sour on penalties. They finished last in the 2013–14 Lebanese Premier League and were relegated to the Second Division. Ijtimaii promptly won the Second Division in 2014–15 and were promoted back to the Premier League.

Ijtimaii reached the Lebanese Challenge Cup final for a second time in 2015, losing 3–1 to Shabab Sahel, with Mustafa Kamaleddine scoring the club's only goal. During the 2015–16 Lebanese Premier League, the club finished ninth and reached the semi-finals of the Lebanese FA Cup. Ijtimaii was reported to have operated on a budget of approximately $200,000, described as the smallest among the Premier League clubs.

In the 2016–17 Lebanese Premier League, Ijtimaii finished last and were relegated to the Second Division. The club remained in the Second Division until 2023–24, when it finished 11th and was relegated to the Lebanese Third Division. Ijtimaii returned to the Second Division after gaining promotion from the 2025–26 Lebanese Third Division.

== Stadiums ==
Ijtimaii plays its home matches at the Tripoli Municipal Stadium, also known as the Rachid Karami Municipal Stadium, in Tripoli. The stadium is operated by the Tripoli Municipality and has also been used as a home venue by fellow Tripoli club Tripoli. Ijtimaii also played home matches at the Tripoli International Olympic Stadium.

== Rivalries ==
Ijtimaii contests the Tripoli derby, also known as the North derby, against Tripoli, with both clubs based in Tripoli. In 2016, a proposal was discussed to merge the two clubs to form a single team representing the city, but the proposal did not materialize.

== Honours ==
- Lebanese Second Division
  - Winners (3): 1991–92, 2011–12, 2014–15
- Lebanese Third Division
  - Winners (1): 2006–07
- Lebanese Challenge Cup (defunct)
  - Runners-up (2): 2013, 2015

== See also ==
- List of football clubs in Lebanon
