= Racing Club Beirut =

Lebanese association football club

Racing Beirut
- Full name: Racing Club
- Nicknames: القلعة البيضاء (The White Castle) سندباد الكرة اللبنانية (The Sinbad of Lebanese Football)
- Short name: Racing
- Founded: 1934; 92 years ago
- Ground: Sharek Stadium
- Chairman: Georges Hanna
- Manager: James Hemaid
- League: Lebanese Second Division
- 2025–26: Lebanese Premier League, 11th of 12 (relegated)
Home colours	Away colours

Racing Club (Arabic: نادي الراسينغ), known as Racing Beirut or simply Racing, is a football club based in Achrafieh, a district in Beirut, Lebanon, that competes in the Lebanese Second Division. They are primarily supported by the Greek Orthodox Christian community.

Racing Beirut won the Lebanese Premier League three times, the Lebanese Challenge Cup twice, and the Lebanese Second Division four times. They also finished runners-up in the Lebanese FA Cup twice.

== History ==
=== Early history ===
Racing Beirut was founded in 1934 by several locals from the Achrafieh and Gemmayzeh districts of Beirut, Lebanon. The club's name is inspired from French football club Racing Paris, who the club's presidents supported. Racing played five years in the Lebanese Second Division, and got its first promotion to the Lebanese Premier League in 1940.

In 1953, Albert Kheir was elected as the club's president. He sought to heighten the club's status in the country, by buying 20-year-old Joseph Abou Murad from Intissar Chayyah, Said Haidar from Al Nahda, and Yuguslavian coach Ljubiša Broćić.

Racing played international friendly games against a variety of famous clubs and selections during the 1970s, including one against the Brazil national under-23 team.

=== Recent history ===
The match between Ahed and Racing in the first matchday of the 2023–24 Lebanese Premier League, on 6 August 2023, was the first to test the use of video assistant referee (VAR). They finished 11th in the 2025–26 Lebanese Premier League, and were relegated to the Second Division.

== Club rivalries ==
Historically, during the 1960s and 1970s, Racing's main rivals were Nejmeh, also from Beirut. Racing plays the Achrafieh derby with Sagesse.

== Players ==
=== Squad ===
As of 26 March, 2026

Note: Flags indicate national team as defined under FIFA eligibility rules; some limited exceptions apply. Players may hold more than one non-FIFA nationality.

No.	Pos.	Nation	Player
1	GK	LBN	Hassan Moghnieh
2	DF	LBN	Mohammad Ali Kammouni
4	DF	LBN	Houssam Al-Kour
5	DF	LBN	Charbel Hanna
7	FW	LBN	Ali Markabawi
8	MF	LBN	Adam Kobeissi
9	FW	LBN	Ali Imad Moussawi
10	MF	LBN	Joseph Aoun
11	FW	MTN	Mamadou Niass
12	DF	LBN	Ali Ayoub (captain)
13	MF	LBN	Chris Mansour
14	DF	LBN	Ali Tawbi
15	DF	SEN	Tamsir Cissé
16	FW	LBN	Eli Baradhi
17	MF	SEN	Malick Dieng

No.	Pos.	Nation	Player
18	MF	LBN	Julien Jamous
19	DF	LBN	Saad Chweiki
20	MF	LBN	Sami Moanaki
21	MF	LBN	Charbel Feghali
22	GK	LBN	Omar Idlibi
23	MF	LBN	Miguel Karam
25	GK	LBN	Ali El-Akbar Dia
26	DF	NGA	Abiodun Adebayo
30	DF	LBN	Nicolas Berbari
35	FW	LBN	Angelo El-Chidiac
43	FW	LBN	Ali Haidar Ahmad
70	MF	LBN	Samer El-Jawhari
77	MF	LBN	Hamza Tarhini
88	FW	LBN	Ali Chahla

== Shirt manufacturers ==
- 2008: Adidas
- 2009: Lotto
- 2010: Lotto
- 2011–2013: Adidas
- 2014–2016: Diadora
- 2016–2018: Joma
- 2018–2022: Capelli Sport
- 2022–: Joma

== Honours ==
=== League ===
- Lebanese Premier League
  - Winners (3): 1955–56, 1964–65, 1969–70
- Lebanese Second Division
  - Winners (4): 1938–39, 1999–2000, 2006–07, 2022–23

=== Cup ===
- Lebanese Challenge Cup (defunct)
  - Winners (2; joint record): 2016, 2017
- Lebanese FA Cup
  - Runners-up (2): 1944–45, 1947–48

== Managerial history ==
- (Socialist Federal Republic of Yugoslavia) Ljubiša Broćić (1955)
- (Romania) Ion Bogdan (1967–1970)
- (Romania) Dorian Marin (2004–2005)
- (Czech Republic) Libor Pala (2012–2015)
- (Romania) Eugen Moldovan (2015–2016)
- (Lebanon) Moussa Hojeij (2016–2017)
- (Lebanon) Roda Antar (2017–2019)
- (Lebanon) Jalal Radwan (2019–2020)
- (Lebanon) Said Jraidini (2020–2021)
- (Palestine) Ismail Kortam (2021–2023)
- (Montenegro) Vladimir Vujović (2023–2024)
- (Sudan) Osama Sakr (2025–2025)
- (Syria) Hussein Afesh (2025–2026)
- (Switzerland) James Hemaid (2026–present)

== See also ==
- List of football clubs in Lebanon
