= Salam Zgharta FC =

Lebanese football club

Salam Zgharta
- Full name: Salam Zgharta Football Club
- Short name: Salam
- Founded: 1933; 93 years ago, as Salam Achrafieh SC; 1971; 55 years ago, as Salam Zgharta FC
- Ground: Zgharta Sports Complex
- Capacity: 5,500
- Chairman: Estephan Frangieh
- Manager: Ricardo Cerqueira
- League: Lebanese Second Division
- 2025–26: Lebanese Second Division, 3rd of 12
- Website: www.salamzgharta.com
Home colours	Away colours

Salam Zgharta Football Club (Arabic: نادي السلام الرياضي زغرتا, lit. 'The Peace Sports Club Zgharta'), known as Salam Zgharta or simply Salam, is a football club based in Zgharta, Lebanon, that competes in the Lebanese Second Division.

Founded in 1933 as Salam Achrafieh, the club was renamed Salam Zgharta in 1971; their supporters are primarily Maronites from the Zgharta region and other districts in North Lebanon. The club's traditional kit colours are red and black. In 2014, they won the Lebanese FA Cup, their only major trophy to date.

== History ==
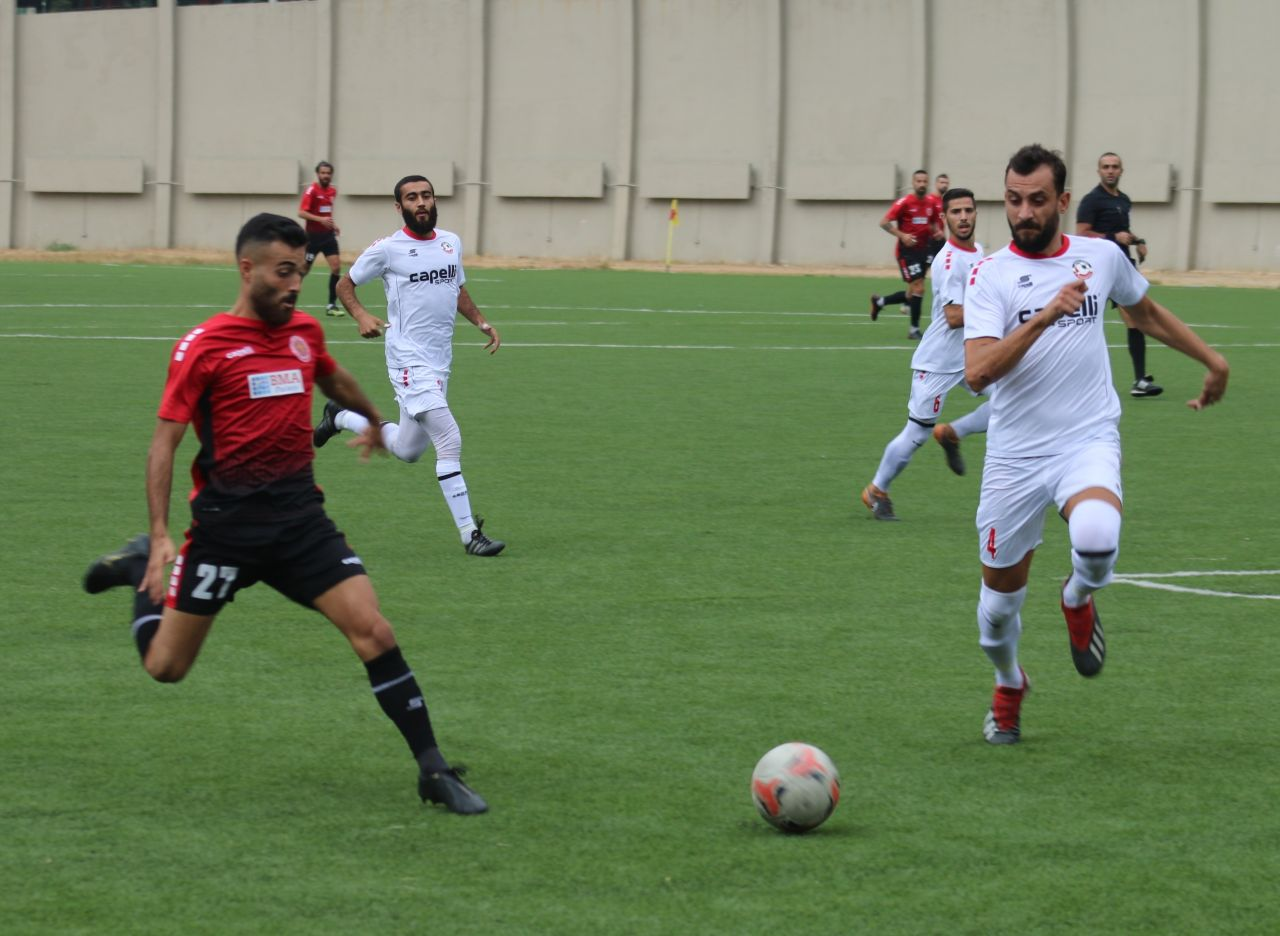
Salam Zgharta (white) against Nejmeh (red) in 2020

Salam Zgharta was founded in 1971, after a group of football enthusiasts bought the licence of former club Salam Achrafieh (Arabic: نادي السلام الأشرفية), based in the Achrafieh district of Beirut. In their first season, the club got demoted to the Lebanese Second Division with Riyada Wal Adab, after the early finish of the season due to start of the Lebanese Civil War.

The start of the 1990s was positive for the Northern club, finishing third in the 1990–91 Lebanese Premier League with 35 points. Following the expansion of the Premier League to 20 teams divided into two groups, Salam Zgharta finished the 1991–92 season as second of their group and fourth in the league standing after securing 23 points in 20 games. In 1996, Youssef Jabbour got elected vice president.

In the mid-2000s, Kabalan lost interest in the club; an election took place in October 2006, three games after the start of the 2006–07 season, and Estephan Frangieh became the president.

In the 2020–21 season, after eight consecutive seasons in the top flight, Salam Zgharta were relegated to the Second Division. They were promoted in 2021–22, after finishing second in the Second Division, before being relegated back in 2022–23, finishing 11th in the Premier League.

== Club rivalries ==
Salam Zgharta plays the North derby with Tripoli, as they are both located in the same area. The first derby between Salam Zgharta and Tripoli was played on 18 December 2005, at the Rachid Karame Municipality Stadium. The home team, Salam Zgharta, won the game 1–0 after a goal from Wehbe Douaihy in the 58th minute.

== Players ==
=== Current squad ===
As of 22 September 2024

Note: Flags indicate national team as defined under FIFA eligibility rules; some limited exceptions apply. Players may hold more than one non-FIFA nationality.

No.	Pos.	Nation	Player
1	GK	LBN	Youssed Mrad
2	DF	LBN	Yehya Kahil
4	MF	PLE	Ahmad Yassine
5	MF	LBN	Amer Mahfoud (captain)
7	MF	LBN	Mohammad Samrout
8	MF	LBN	Ghazi Hussein
9	FW	LBN	Haidar Awada
11	FW	LBN	Jason Bayeh
12	DF	LBN	Rawad Gitani
16	DF	LBN	Patrick Mannah
17	MF	LBN	Fouad Khawaja
19	FW	NGR	Obulor Silas

No.	Pos.	Nation	Player
22	DF	LBN	Adel Khalil
25	DF	LBN	Joe Khawaja
70	DF	NGR	Emmanuel Obere
89	GK	LBN	Joseph Bitar
—	FW	LBN	Mohammad Chaaban
—		LBN	Issa Nadi Bazzi
—	DF	LBN	Alex El Rattel
—	DF	LBN	Mohamad Korhani
—	FW	LBN	Mohamad Al-Zahed
—		LBN	Imad Al Azmeh
—	GK	LBN	Elio Derjani
—	FW	LBN	Elio Rostom
—	FW	LBN	Anthony Azizi

=== Notable players ===
Players in international competitions
Competition	Player	National team
2019 AFC Asian Cup	Walid Ismail	Lebanon
2019 AFC Asian Cup	Mostafa Matar	Lebanon

== Honours ==
- Lebanese FA Cup
  - Winners (1): 2013–14
- Lebanese Second Division
  - Winners (6): 1933–34, (Note: As Salam Achrafieh) 1936–37, 1997–98, 2004–05, 2007–08, 2012–13 (group A)
- Lebanese Federation Cup
  - Runners-up (1): 1999
- Lebanese Super Cup
  - Runners-up (1): 2014
- Lebanese Challenge Cup (defunct)
  - Runners-up (2): 2016, 2019

== Performance in AFC competitions ==
- AFC Cup: 1 appearance

2015: Group stage

== See also ==
- List of football clubs in Lebanon
