= Lebanese Second Division =

Second tier of the football pyramid of professional football league in Lebanon

- Organising body: Lebanese Football Association (LFA)
- Founded: 1933; 93 years ago
- Country: Lebanon
- Confederation: AFC
- Number of clubs: 12
- Level on pyramid: 2
- Promotion to: Lebanese Premier League
- Relegation to: Lebanese Third Division
- Domestic cup: Lebanese FA Cup
- Current champions: Akhaa Ahli Aley (3rd title) (2025–26)
- Broadcaster(s): FIFA+
- Website: the-lfa.com
- Current: 2025–26 Lebanese Second Division

The Lebanese Second Division (Arabic: الدوري اللبناني الدرجة الثانية) is the second division of Lebanese football. Established in 1933, it is controlled by the Lebanese Football Association.

== Format ==
The 12 teams in the league play each other twice, home and away. After the regular season, the league splits into three groups:

1. Top four: Play home-and-away matches to determine promotion; the top two are promoted to the Lebanese Premier League.
2. Bottom four: Play home-and-away matches to determine relegation; the bottom two are relegated to the Third Division.
3. Middle four (5th–8th): Season ends; teams remain in the Second Division.

== History ==
Salam Achrafieh won the inaugural edition of the Second Division, in 1933–34, after beating Ararad 2–0 in the final. There was no promotion or relegation system at the time, so Salam Achrafieh remained in the Second Division. In April 1935, Second Division clubs requested a promotion system to be implemented. It was proposed that, at the end of the season, every Second Division team that wanted to be promoted to the First Division had to play against three teams from the First Division, one match each, winning all three. The teams from the First Division had to have at least seven players from their previous season's squad.

== Clubs ==
=== Champions ===
The following is a list of Lebanese Second Division champions.

No.	Season	Champion(s)
1	1933–34	Salam Achrafieh
2	1934–35	International
3	1935–36	International
4	1936–37	Salam Achrafieh
5	1937–38	Hilmi-Sport
6	1938–39	Racing Beirut
	1939–40	Canceled
7	1940–41	Antranik B
8	1941–42	Shabiba Mazraa
9	1942–43	
10	1943–44	Sagesse
11	1944–45	
12	1945–46	Club de Gaulle
13	1946–47	Pagramian
14	1947–48	Sagesse
15	1948–49	
	1949–50	Canceled
16	1950–51	Nejmeh
	1951 to 1953	Not in operation
17	1953–54	

No.	Season	Champion(s)
18	1954–55	
19	1955–56	Sagesse
20	1956–57	
	1957 to 1960	Not in operation
21	1959–60	Various (Note: Mount Lebanon: Nejmet Sahra Beirut: unknown South: unknown North: unknown)
22	1960–61	Various (Note: Mount Lebanon: Chark Beirut: Safa South: Tadamon Sour North: Amal)
23	1961–62	
24	1962–63	Various (Note: Mount Lebanon: Nejmet Sahra Beirut: unknown South: unknown North: unknown)
25	1963–64	Various
26	1964–65	Homenetmen BH
27	1965–66	Istiklal
28	1966–67	Istiklal
	1967–68	Not contested
29	1968–69	
30	1969–70	
	1970 to 1972	Not in operation
31	1972–73	
	1973–74	Canceled
32	1974–75	
	1975 to 1987	Not in operation

No.	Season	Champion(s)
33	1987–88	Mabarra
	1988 to 1990	Not in operation
34	1990–91	Bourj
35	1991–92	Egtmaaey
36	1992–93	Akhaa Ahli Aley
37	1993–94	Harakat Shabab
38	1994–95	Riada Wal Adab
39	1995–96	Shabiba Mazraa
40	1996–97	Ahli Saida
41	1997–98	Salam Zgharta
42	1998–99	Sagesse
43	1999–2000	Racing Beirut
44	2000–01	Bourj
45	2001–02	Olympic Beirut
46	2002–03	Homenetmen
47	2003–04	Akhaa Ahli Aley
48	2004–05	Salam Zgharta
49	2005–06	Shabab Sahel
50	2006–07	Racing Beirut
51	2007–08	Salam Zgharta

No.	Season	Champion
52	2008–09	Ahli Saida
53	2009–10	Salam Sour
54	2010–11	Tripoli
55	2011–12	Egtmaaey
56	2012–13	Various (Note: Group A: Salam Zgharta Group B: Mabarra)
57	2013–14	Various (Note: Group A: Chabab Ghazieh Group B: Nabi Chit)
58	2014–15	Egtmaaey
59	2015–16	Tadamon Sour
60	2016–17	Shabab Arabi
61	2017–18	Shabab Sahel
62	2018–19	Bourj
	2019–20	Not awarded
63	2020–21	Sporting
64	2021–22	Chabab Ghazieh
65	2022–23	Racing Beirut
66	2023–24	Riyadi Abbasiyah
67	2024–25	Jwaya
68	2025–26	Akhaa Ahli Aley

=== 2025–26 season ===
The following 12 clubs competed in the Lebanese Second Division during the 2025–26 season.

Team	Home city	Position in 2024–25
Ahly Nabatieh	Nabatieh	3rd
Akhaa Ahli Aley	Aley	9th
BFA Sporting	Beirut	7th
Chabab Ghazieh	Ghaziyeh	12th in the Premier League
Hilal Nasr	Ras el-Matn	2nd in the Third Division
Irshad Chehim	Shheem	10th
Ittihad Haret Naameh	Haret en Naameh	1st in the Third Division
Okhwa Kharayeb	Kharayeb	4th
Rissala Toura	Toura	8th
Salam Zgharta	Zgharta	6th
Shabab Baalbek	Baalbek	11th in the Premier League
Tripoli	Tripoli	5th

== Media coverage ==
In 2019, MyCujoo streamed a selection of Lebanese Second Division games weekly. In October 2022, the LFA and FIFA signed an agreement to broadcast all matches in the Lebanese Second Division, Lebanese Super Cup and Lebanese Women's Football League, and some Lebanese Premier League games, through the FIFA+ platform.

== See also ==
- List of second division football clubs in AFC countries

== Bibliography ==
- Henshaw, Richard (1979). The Encyclopedia of World Soccer. Washington, D.C.: New Republic Books. ISBN 0915220342.
- Sakr, Ali Hamidi (1992). موسوعة كرة القدم اللبنانية 1991–1992 [1991–1992 Lebanese Football Encyclopedia] (PDF) (in Arabic). مؤسسة نوفل للتوزيع. ISBN 0000281247.
