= Al Ahli SC Saida =

Lebanese football club

Ahli Saida
- Full name: Al Ahli Sporting Club Saida
- Founded: 1954; 71 years ago
- Ground: Saida Municipal Stadium
- Capacity: 22,000
- Chairman: Ahmad Al Hariri
- League: Lebanese Third Division
- 2023–24: Lebanese Third Division Group C, 3rd of 6
- Website: alahlisaida.com
| Home colours | Away colours |

Al Ahli Sporting Club Saida (Arabic: النادي الاهلي الرياضي صيدا) is a football club based in Sidon, Lebanon, that competes in the Lebanese Third Division. Ahli Saida last competed in the Lebanese Premier League in the 2011–12 season, where they were relegated after finishing in 12th position.

== Stadium ==
Home matches are normally played in the Saida Municipal Stadium, which can hold up to 22,000 supporters.

== Honours ==
- Lebanese Second Division
  - Winners (2): 1996–97, 2008–09

== See also ==
- List of football clubs in Lebanon
