= Akram Moghrabi =

Lebanese footballer (born 1985)

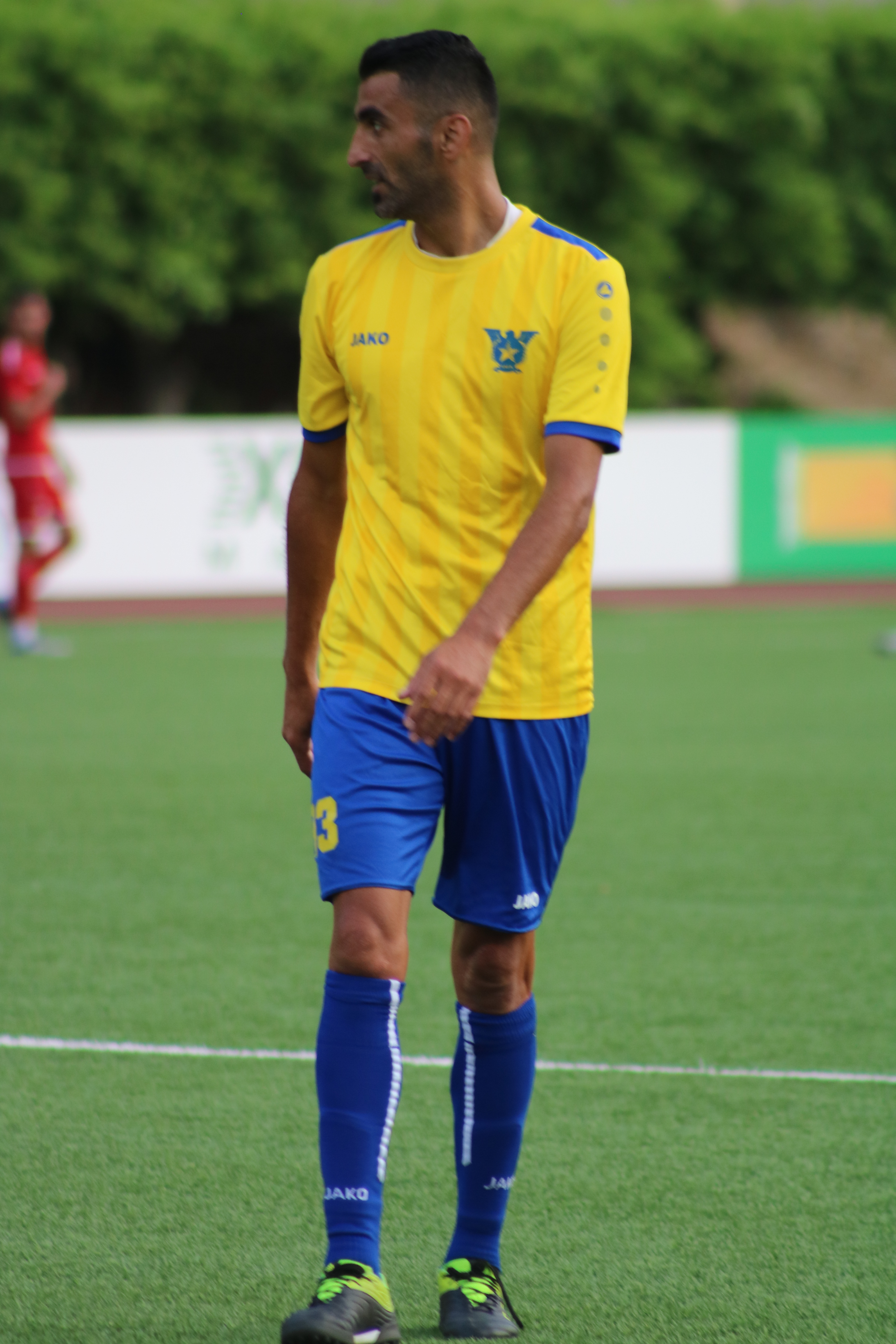
- Moghrabi with Safa in 2020

Personal information
- Full name: Akram Omar Moghrabi
- Date of birth: 19 October 1985 (age 41)
- Place of birth: Tripoli, Lebanon
- Height: 1.89 m (6 ft 2 in)
- Position: Forward

Team information
- Current team: Tripoli

Youth career
- 2002–2005: Nejmeh

Senior career*
Years	Team	Apps	(Gls)
2005–2018	Nejmeh	55+	(57)
2012–2013	→ Churchill Brothers (loan)	18	(10)
2014–2015	→ Tripoli (loan)	16	(5)
2018	→ Mohun Bagan (loan)	9	(4)
2018–2019	Ahed	16	(2)
2019–2020	Tripoli	0	(0)
2020–2021	Safa	15	(7)
2021–2022	Bourj	16	(1)
2022–2023	Sagesse	7	(0)
2023–2024	Akhaa Ahli Aley	10	(4)
2024–2025	Tripoli	14	(2)
2025–2026	Salam Zgharta	25	(10)
2026–	Tripoli	0	(0)

International career
2007	Lebanon U23		
2007–2012	Lebanon	32	(4)
- * Club domestic league appearances and goals as of 26 July 2026

Akram Omar Moghrabi (Arabic: أكرم عمر مغربي; born 19 October 1985) is a Lebanese professional footballer who plays as a forward for Lebanese Premier League club Tripoli.

== Club career ==
Moghrabi signed for Nejmeh's youth sector on 11 September 2002. On 23 July 2012 I-League club Churchill Brothers signed Moghrabi on a one-year deal. On 11 October 2012, he scored a hat-trick against ONGC. On 4 January 2013, he scored a brace against Shillong Lajong in a 6–0 win. Moghrabi returned to Nejmeh for the 2013–14 season. In summer 2014, Moghrabi signed for Tripoli on a one-year loan. In July 2015, Moghrabi returned to Nejmeh. In January 2018, Moghrabi signed for I-League club Mohun Bagan.

After being released by Nejmeh, Moghrabi joined Ahed on a one-year contract in September 2018. In September 2019, Moghrabi returned to Tripoli. On 5 September 2020, Moghrabi joined Safa. He scored a hat-trick on 3 January 2021, in a 5–0 win over Salam Zgharta in the league. On 22 May 2021, Moghrabi moved to Bourj. On 4 July 2022, Moghrabi moved to Sagesse, alongside Bourj teammate Abou Bakr Al-Mel.

In December 2023, Moghrabi signed for Akhaa Ahli Aley. In September 2024, Moghrabi returned once again to Tripoli. After playing the 2025–26 Lebanese Second Division season with Salam Zgharta, Moghrabi was released by the club in August 2026. In September 2026, Moghrabi signed for Tripoli for a fourth time.

== Personal life ==
Akram's brother, Ahmad, was also a footballer.

== Career statistics ==
=== International ===
Scores and results list Lebanon's goal tally first, score column indicates score after each Moghrabi goal.

List of international goals scored by Akram Moghrabi
No.	Date	Venue	Opponent	Score	Result	Competition	Ref.
1	14 January 2009	Mỹ Đình National Stadium, Hanoi, Vietnam	Vietnam	1–3	1–3	2011 AFC Asian Cup qualification	
2	22 August 2009	Ambedkar Stadium, New Delhi, India	Sri Lanka	1–1	3–4	2009 Nehru Cup	
3	6 September 2011	Camille Chamoun Sports City Stadium, Beirut, Lebanon	United Arab Emirates	2–1	3–1	2014 FIFA World Cup qualification	
4	30 June 2012	Prince Abdullah Al-Faisal Sports City Stadium, Jeddah, Saudi Arabia	Egypt	1–1	1–1	2012 Arab Cup	

== Honours ==
Nejmeh

- Lebanese Premier League: 2008–09, 2013–14
- Lebanese FA Cup: 2015–16
- Lebanese Elite Cup: 2014, 2016, 2017
- Lebanese Super Cup: 2014, 2016

Churchill Brothers

- I-League: 2012–13

Tripoli

- Lebanese FA Cup: 2014–15

Ahed

- AFC Cup: 2019
- Lebanese Premier League: 2018–19
- Lebanese FA Cup: 2018–19
- Lebanese Super Cup: 2018

Bourj

- Lebanese Challenge Cup: 2021

Individual

- Lebanese Premier League Team of the Season: 2016–17

== See also ==
- List of association football families
