= Mohamad Korhani =

Lebanese footballer (born 1981)

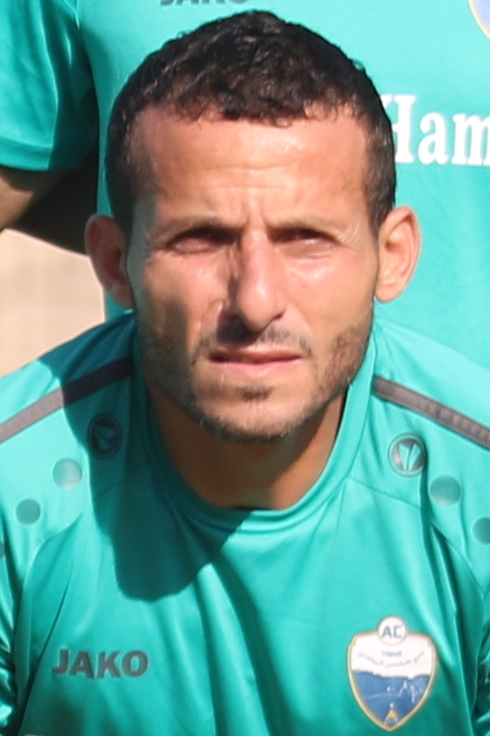
- Korhani with Tripoli in 2021

Personal information
- Full name: Mohamad Ahmad Korhani
- Date of birth: 10 March 1981 (age 45)
- Place of birth: Souaisset, Lebanon
- Height: 1.74 m (5 ft 9 in)
- Position: Left-back

Senior career*
Years	Team	Apps	(Gls)
2006–2013	Safa		(5)
2013–2014	Egtmaaey	20	(2)
2014–2018	Ansar	48	(0)
2018–2021	Akhaa Ahli Aley	30	(0)
2021–2024	Tripoli	50	(3)
2024–	Salam Zgharta		

International career
2007–2015	Lebanon	27	(2)
- * Club domestic league appearances and goals as of 23 May 2024

Mohamad Ahmad Korhani (Arabic: محمد أحمد قرحاني; born 10 March 1981) is a Lebanese footballer who plays as a left-back and center-back for Lebanese Second Division club Salam Zgharta.

== Club career ==
On 22 May 2018, Korhani joined Akhaa Ahli Aley from Ansar. He moved to Tripoli on 7 May 2021.

== Career statistics ==
=== International ===
Scores and results list Lebanon's goal tally first, score column indicates score after each Korhani goal.

List of international goals scored by Mohamad Korhani
No.	Date	Venue	Opponent	Score	Result	Competition	Ref.
1	23 April 2008	Rasmee Dhandu Stadium, Malé, Maldives	Maldives	1–0	2–1	2011 AFC Asian Cup qualification	
2	22 August 2009	Ambedkar Stadium, New Delhi, India	Sri Lanka	3–4	3–4	2009 Nehru Cup	

== Honours ==
Safa

- Lebanese Premier League: 2011–12, 2012–13
- Lebanese FA Cup: 2012–13
- Lebanese Elite Cup: 2012

Ansar

- Lebanese FA Cup: 2016–17

Tripoli

- Lebanese Challenge Cup runner-up: 2021

Individual

- Lebanese Premier League Team of the Season: 2007–08, 2014–15
- Lebanese Challenge Cup top scorer: 2021 (Note: Tied with Abou Bakr Al-Mel)
