= List of retired numbers in association football =

Association football clubs around the world sometimes retire squad numbers to recognise players' service to the club, whether that be through their loyalty or quality.

== Background ==
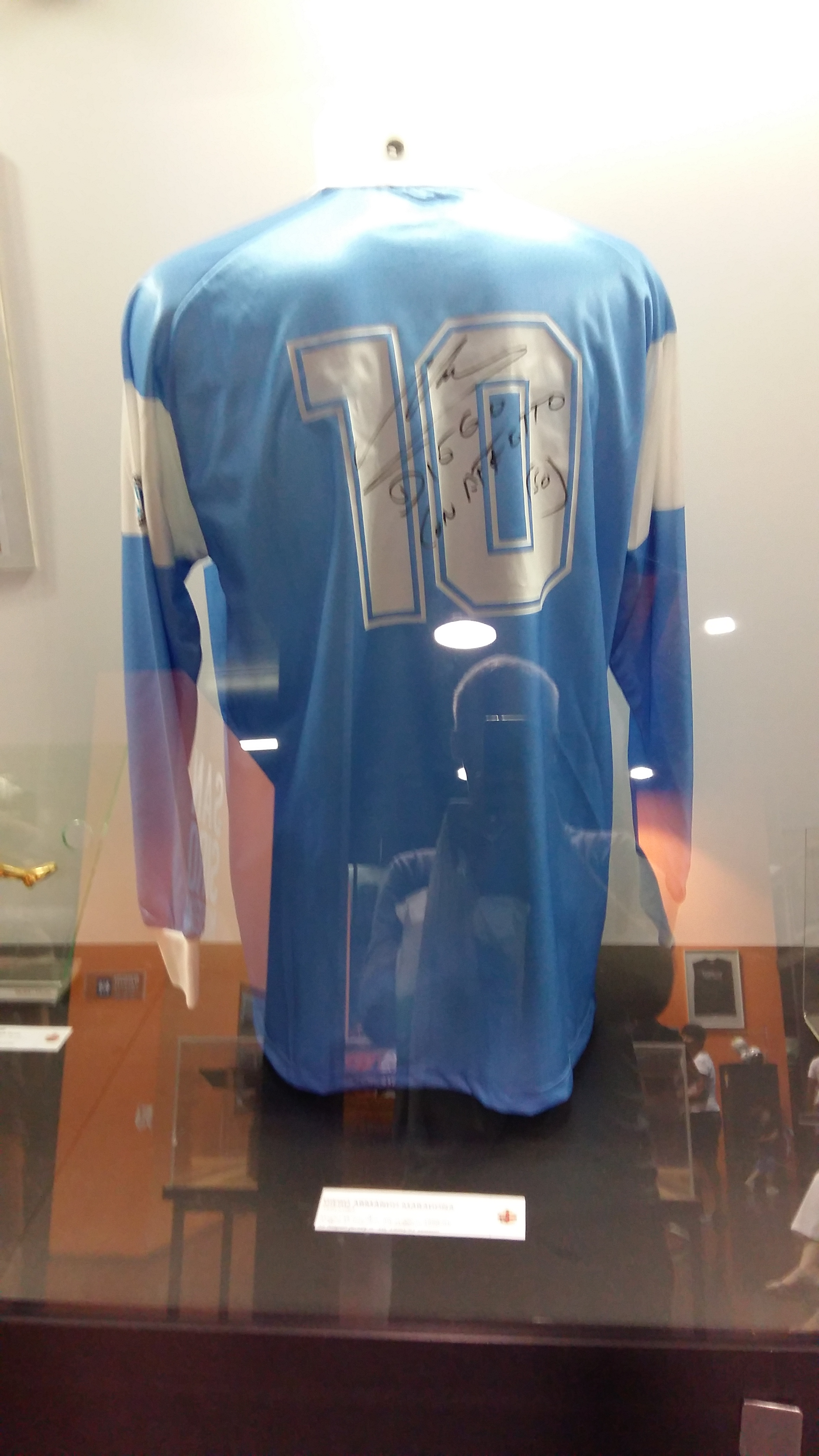
Signed jersey worn by Diego Maradona during his tenure on Italian club Napoli, exhibited at the San Siro Museum of Milan. The number 10 he wore was retired by Napoli in 2000.

This practice, long established in the major North American sports, is a recent development in football elsewhere, since squad numbers for specific players were not widely used until the 1990s. Before then, it was typical for players in the starting lineup to be issued numbers 1 to 11 by formation/position on a match-by-match basis, and substitutes to be numbered from 12 upwards, meaning a player might wear different numbers during the season if they were to play in different positions for tactical reasons, or simply not be a regular in the starting lineup.

In contrast, in the former American league the North American Soccer League, players wore permanent numbers since its inception in 1967. Moreover, Pelé's #10 was retired by the New York Cosmos during the farewell of the Brazilian star on 1 October 1977, becoming the first number ever retired in association football.

Mexico was a pioneer country in the use of permanent numbers in football; these were adopted in the Primera División in the 1980s.

Retiring a player's shirt number usually occurs after the player has left the team or retired. It honours a player who has meant much to his club, and no other player is permitted to use that number in the future. In some cases, such as those of Marc-Vivien Foé, Davide Astori, and Diogo Jota, numbers have been retired to posthumously honour a player who died while still active. Also, Norwegian club Fredrikstad retired Dagfinn Enerly's number following an on-pitch accident that left him paralysed. In Britain, only Bobby Moore's, Jack Lester's, and Jude Bellingham's shirt numbers have been retired due to great service to the club as opposed to a tragic incident. Although it had not been officially retired, Gianfranco Zola's No. 25 shirt had not been reissued by Chelsea since he left the club in 2003 until re-issued to Moisés Caicedo in 2023.

The Argentina, Ecuador and Cameroon national teams have been prevented from retiring the numbers of Diego Maradona (10), Christian Benítez (11) and Marc-Vivien Foé (17), respectively, by FIFA rules dealing with squad numbers for Finals tournaments; in other competitions, qualifiers or friendlies, national associations may assign numbers according to criteria of their choosing. Similarly, several clubs have been required to reissue retired numbers for continental club competitions due to squad numbering rules of continental confederations. For example, CAF and CONMEBOL have such rules in their club competitions, but CONCACAF does not.

Some South American teams (such as Universitario de Deportes and Flamengo, and even Mexican teams invited for the occasions) occasionally had to re-issue their retired numbers for special cases due to CONMEBOL rules, which stated that shirts had to be numbered 1–25/30 in continental club competitions (such as Copa Libertadores and Copa Sudamericana, among others), although nowadays clubs are not forced to number their players consecutively.

== Retired numbers ==
Team	No.	Player	Pos.	Tenure	Notes
(Argentina) Godoy Cruz	18	(Uruguay) Santiago García	FW	2016–21	Posthumous (Note: Number retired after García died by suicide on 4 February 2021. He was the all-time club top scorer in Argentine Primera División.)
(Australia) Brisbane Roar (women)	13	(Australia) Tameka Yallop	FW	2008–18, 2019–21, 2023–26	Club legend
(Australia) Central Coast Mariners	19	(Australia) Matt Simon	FW	2006–12, 2013–15, 2018–22	Club legend
(Austria) Red Bull Salzburg	26	(Spain) Jonathan Soriano	FW	2012–17	Club legend
(Austria) Sturm Graz	3	(Austria) Günther Neukirchner	DF	1989–2006	Club legend
(Austria) Sturm Graz	7	(Austria) Mario Haas	FW	1993–2012	Club legend
(Austria) SV Ried	27	(Austria) Sanel Kuljić	FW	2003–06	
(Azerbaijan) Netfçi PFK	9	(Azerbaijan) Anatoliy Banishevskiy	FW	1963–1978	Club legend
(Belgium) Sporting Charleroi	11	(Belgium) Dante Brogno	FW	1986–2001	Club legend
(Belgium) Club Brugge	23	(Belgium) François Sterchele	FW	2007–08	Posthumous
(Belgium) Genk	16	(South Africa) Anele Ngcongca	DF	2007–16	Posthumous
(Belgium) OH Leuven	13	(Belgium) Bjorn Ruytinx	FW	2004–14	Club legend
(Belgium) UR Namur	3	(Belgium) Michel Soulier	DF	1967–77	Posthumous
(Bosnia and Herzegovina) Borac Banja Luka	8	(Bosnia and Herzegovina) Mladen Žižović	MF	2012–14	Posthumous
(Brazil) Avaí	88	(Brazil) Cléber Santana	MF	2012, 2013–14	Posthumous
(Brazil) São Paulo	01	(Brazil) Rogério Ceni	GK	1990–2015	Club legend (Note: His double-digit number, worn from 2007, was retired on 12 December 2015 when he retired from football. The single-digit '1' may still be used, but the iconic '01', which is an inverted '10', is retired.)
(Bulgaria) Lokomotiv Plovdiv	8	(Bulgaria) Hristo Bonev	MF	1963–67, 1968–79, 1982–84	Club legend
(Bulgaria) Ludogorets Razgrad	84	(Bulgaria) Marcelinho	MF	2011–20	Club legend
(Canada) CF Montréal	20	(Canada) Mauro Biello	FW	1993–98, 2000–09	Club legend
(Canada) Serbian White Eagles	9	(Canada) Mike Stojanović	FW	1973–76	Club legend
(Canada) Vancouver Whitecaps	5	(Canada) Bob Lenarduzzi	DF	1974–84, 1987–93	Club legend
(Canada) Vancouver Whitecaps	10	(Canada) Domenic Mobilio	FW	1987–2001	Club legend
(Chile) Cobreloa	8	(Chile) Fernando Cornejo	MF	1992–97, 2000–04	Posthumous
(China) Beijing Enterprises	24	(Ivory Coast) Cheick Tioté	MF	2017	Posthumous
(China) Beijing Guoan	13	(China) Xu Yunlong	DF	1999–2016	Club legend
(China) Chengdu Blades	18	(China) Yao Xia	FW	2005–10	Club legend
(China) Dalian Shide	26	(China) Zhang Yalin	MF	2000–09	Posthumous
(China) Dalian Transcendence	17	(China) Wang Renlong	FW	2014	Posthumous
(China) Heilongjiang Ice City	5	(China) Ren Jianglong	DF	2015–22	Posthumous
(Costa Rica) Alajuelense	20	(Costa Rica) Mauricio Montero	DF	1987–98	Club legend
(Costa Rica) Cartaginés	11	(Costa Rica) Leonel Hernández	FW	1957–77	Club legend
(Cyprus) Anorthosis Famagusta	14	(Georgia (country)) Temur Ketsbaia	MF	1991–94, 2002–09	Club legend
(Czech Republic) Baník Ostrava	27	(Czech Republic) Milan Baroš	FW	1998–01, 2013, 2014–15, 2017–20	No. retired in 2020
(Czech Republic) České Budějovice	8	(Czech Republic) Karel Poborský	MF	1991–94, 2005–07	Club legend
(Czech Republic) Viktoria Plzeň	27	(Czech Republic) František Rajtoral	DF/MF	2009–16	Posthumous
(Czech Republic) Viktoria Plzeň	28	(Slovakia) Marián Čišovský	DF	2011–14	Posthumous
(Denmark) AaB	12	(Denmark) Torben Boye	DF	1984–2002	Club legend
(Denmark) Nordsjælland	26	(Denmark) Jonathan Richter	MF	2005–09	After retirement (Note: Richter lost his leg as a result of a lightning strike)
(Denmark) Næstved BK	7	(Denmark) Rasmus Green	MF	2005–06	Posthumous
(Denmark) Viborg FF	22	(Denmark) Søren Frederiksen	FW	1989–94, 1998, 2001–05	
(England) Accrington Stanley	29	(Northern Ireland) Billy Kee	FW	2009–10, 2015–20	Prematurely retired (Note: Kee had to leave football due to mental health issues.)
(England) Birmingham City	22	(England) Jude Bellingham	MF	2019–20	(Note: Recognised as the youngest-ever first-team player and goalscorer.)
(England) Chesterfield	14	(England) Jack Lester	FW	2007–13	Club legend
(England) Hartlepool United	25	(England) Michael Maidens	MF	2004–07	Posthumous
(England) Liverpool	20	(Portugal) Diogo Jota	FW	2020–25	Posthumous
(England) Macclesfield	20	(England) Ethan McLeod	MF	2025–26	Posthumous
(England) Macclesfield Town	21	(England) Richard Butcher	MF	2010–11	Posthumous
(England) Manchester City	23	(Cameroon) Marc-Vivien Foé	MF	2002–03	Posthumous (Note: Foé died on the pitch while playing for Cameroon, was at Manchester City on loan from Lyon at the time.)
(England) Millwall	20	(Montenegro) Matija Sarkic	GK	2023–24	Posthumous
(England) Queens Park Rangers	31	(England) Ray Jones	FW	2006–07	Posthumous
(England) Rochdale	15	(England) Joe Thompson	CM	2006–12, 2016–19	Posthumous
(England) Rushden & Diamonds	1	(England) Dale Roberts	GK	2008–10	Posthumous
(England) West Ham United	6	(England) Bobby Moore	DF	1958–74	Posthumous
(England) West Ham United	38	(Australia) Dylan Tombides	FW	2010–14	Posthumous
(England) Wycombe Wanderers	14	(England) Mark Philo	MF	2004–06	Posthumous (Note: Philo was killed in a car accident and the number 14 shirt retired. It was later revealed he was significantly over the drink-drive limit and his car veered on to the other side of the road, killing a 58-year-old mother of two.)
(France) Clermont	14	(France) Clément Pinault	DF	2008–09	Posthumous
(France) Lens	17	(Cameroon) Marc-Vivien Foé	MF	1995–99	Posthumous
(France) Nantes	9	(Argentina) Emiliano Sala	FW	2015–19	Posthumous
(France) Nice	17	(France) Kevin Anin	MF	2012–13	Prematurely retired (Note: Anin retired after suffering a serious car accident which left him paralyzed.)
(France) Rennes	29	(France) Romain Danzé	DF	2006–19	Club legend
(France) Saint-Étienne	24	(France) Loïc Perrin	DF	2003–20	Club legend
(France) Sedan	29	(France) David Di Tommaso	DF	2000–04	Posthumous
(Germany) Bayern Munich	5	(Germany) Franz Beckenbauer	DF	1964–77	Posthumous
(Germany) Wacker Burghausen	11	(Slovakia) Marek Krejčí	FW	2004–07	Posthumous
(Germany) VfL Wolfsburg	19	(Belgium) Junior Malanda	MF	2012–15	Posthumous
(Greece) AEL	29	(Uruguay) Mathías Acuña	FW	2021–22	Posthumous
(Greece) Panathinaikos	32	(England) (Greece) George Baldock	DF	2024	Posthumous
(Greece) PAOK	17	(Greece) Panagiotis Katsouris	MF	1996–98	Posthumous
(Greece) Skoda Xanthi	13	(Nigeria) Olubayo Adefemi	DF	2010–11	Posthumous
(Greece) Skoda Xanthi	56	(Ivory Coast) Steve Gohouri	DF	2013–14	Posthumous
(Guatemala) C.S.D. Municipal	15	(Guatemala) Juan Carlos Plata	FW	1990–2010	Club legend
(Haiti) Roulado	7	(Haiti) Jean-Robert Menelas	FW	1993–2007	(Note: Number was retired in recognition of his career at the club and for his all-time record goal scoring in the league. He is the first in the history of Haitian football to have a number permanently removed from use.)
(Honduras) Olimpia	11	(Honduras) Wilmer Velásquez	FW	1991–2009	Club legend
(Hong Kong) Happy Valley	8	(Hong Kong) Cheung Sai Ho	MF	1994–2011	Posthumous
Hong Kong Rangers	15	(Hong Kong) Cheung Yiu Lun	DF	1992–99, 2001–02	Posthumous
(Hong Kong) Sham Shui Po	83	(Hong Kong) Wong Chun Hin	MF	2022	Posthumous
(Hong Kong) South China	38	(Serbia) Mateja Kežman	FW	2011, 2012	Club legend
(Hong Kong) Kitchee	19	(Hong Kong) Huang Yang	MF	2011–24	Club legend
(Hungary) Ferencváros	2	(Hungary) Tibor Simon	DF	1985–99	Posthumous
(Hungary) Kispest AC/Honvéd	10	(Hungary) Ferenc Puskás	FW	1939–56	No. retired in 2000
(India) Bethlehem Vengthlang	21	(India) Peter Biaksangzuala	MF	?–2014	Posthumous (Note: Biaksangzuala died while celebrating a goal)
(India) Dempo SC	10	(Brazil) Christiano Junior	FW	2004	Posthumous
(Indonesia) Arema	1	(Indonesia) Kurnia Meiga	GK	2008–17	Club legend
(Indonesia) Arema	47	(Indonesia) Achmad Kurniawan	GK	2006–08, 2010–17	Posthumous
(Indonesia) Persebaya Surabaya	19	(Indonesia) Eri Irianto	MF	1998–2000	Posthumous
(Indonesia) Persela Lamongan	1	(Indonesia) Choirul Huda	GK	1999–2017	Posthumous
(Indonesia) Persib Bandung	24	(Indonesia) Hariono	MF	2008–19	Club legend
(Indonesia) Persija Jakarta	14	(Indonesia) Ismed Sofyan	DF	2002–22	Club legend
(Indonesia) Persija Jakarta	20	(Indonesia) Bambang Pamungkas	FW	1999–2005, 2007–13, 2015–19	Club legend
(Indonesia) Persis Solo	17	(Indonesia) Ferry Anto	FW	2001–16	Posthumous
(Indonesia) Persis Solo	33	(Paraguay) Diego Mendieta	FW	2011–12	Posthumous
(Indonesia) PSIS Semarang	9	(Indonesia) Erik Dwi Ermawansyah	FW	2017–18	Posthumous
(Indonesia) PSIS Semarang	22	(Indonesia) Hari Nur Yulianto	FW	2013–23	Club legend
(Iran) Persepolis	24	(Iran) Hadi Norouzi	MF/FW	2008–15	Posthumous
(Iran) Sepahan	4	(Iran) Moharram Navidkia	MF	1998–2004, 2006–16	Club legend
(Iran) Zob Ahan	30	(Iran) Mehdi Rajabzadeh	MF	2003–07, 2010–18	
(Republic of Ireland) Derry City	5	(Republic of Ireland) Ryan McBride	DF	2007–17	Posthumous (Note: Number was retired in dedication to the club's captain after he died in his sleep in 2017. McBride was 27 years old.)
(Republic of Ireland) Derry City	18	(Republic of Ireland) Mark Farren	FW	2000–14	Posthumous (Note: Number was retired in dedication to the club's all-time record goal scorer after Farren died of cancer in 2016.)
(Republic of Ireland) Limerick	4	(Republic of Ireland) Joe O'Mahony	DF	1966–86	Posthumous
(Republic of Ireland) Treaty United	4	(Republic of Ireland) Joe O'Mahony	DF	1966–86	Posthumous
(Israel) Hapoel Be'er Sheva	6	(Zambia) Chaswe Nsofwa	FW	2007	Posthumous
(Israel) Maccabi Haifa	20	(Israel) Yaniv Katan	MF/FW	1998–2005, 2006–2014	Club legend
(Israel) Maccabi Haifa	6	(Israel) Gadi Kinda	MF	2024-2025	Posthumous
(Israel) Maccabi Tel Aviv	8	(Israel) Avi Nimni	FW	1990–97, 1998–2003, 2005–08	Club legend
(Israel) Maccabi Tel Aviv	12	(Israel) Meni Levi	DF	2000–02	Prematurely retired (Note: On January 26, 2002 during an Israeli Premier League match against Beitar Jerusalem, Levi suddenly collapsed in the middle of the pitch, away from the run of play. Levi was treated for years, and later returned to his family house in a vegetative state.)
(Italy) Atalanta	14	(Italy) Federico Pisani	FW	1991–97	Posthumous
(Italy) Bari	2	(Italy) Giovanni Loseto	DF	1982–93	Club legend
(Italy) Bologna	27	(Italy) Niccolò Galli	DF	2000–01	Posthumous
(Italy) Brescia	10	(Italy) Roberto Baggio	FW	2000–04	Club legend
(Italy) Brescia	13	(Italy) Vittorio Mero	DF	1998–2002	Posthumous
(Italy) Cagliari	11	(Italy) Gigi Riva	FW	1963–78	Club legend
(Italy) Cagliari	13	(Italy) Davide Astori	DF	2008–14	Posthumous
(Italy) Chievo	30	(Democratic Republic of the Congo) Jason Mayélé	FW	2001–02	Posthumous
(Italy) Chievo	31	(Italy) Sergio Pellissier	FW	2002–19	Club legend
(Italy) Crotone	4	(Italy) Antonio Galardo	MF	1995–98, 2002–16	Club legend
(Italy) Fiorentina	13	(Italy) Davide Astori	DF	2015–18	Posthumous
(Italy) Genoa	6	(Italy) Gianluca Signorini	DF	1988–95	Posthumous
(Italy) Genoa	7	(Italy) Marco Rossi	MF	2003–13	Club legend
(Italy) Internazionale	3	(Italy) Giacinto Facchetti	DF	1961–78	Posthumous
(Italy) Internazionale	4	(Argentina) Javier Zanetti	DF	1995–2014	Club legend
(Italy) Livorno	25	(Italy) Piermario Morosini	MF	2012	Posthumous
(Italy) Messina	41	(Italy) Salvatore Sullo	MF	2001–07	Club legend
(Italy) Milan	3	(Italy) Paolo Maldini	DF	1984–2009	Club legend (Note: Exception granted for another member of Maldini family, in which case the number would be reissued.)
(Italy) Milan	6	(Italy) Franco Baresi	DF	1977–97	Club legend
(Italy) Napoli	10	(Argentina) Diego Maradona	MF	1984–91	Club legend
(Italy) Parma	6	(Italy) Alessandro Lucarelli	DF	2008–18	Club legend
(Italy) Pescara	4	(Italy) (Switzerland) Vincenzo Zucchini	MF	1973–79	Posthumous
(Italy) Salernitana	4	(Italy) Roberto Breda	MF	1993–99, 2003–05	
(Italy) Sassuolo	4	(Italy) Francesco Magnanelli	MF	2005–22	Club legend (Note: Current record holder for most appearances)
(Italy) Siena	4	(Italy) Michele Mignani	DF	1996–97, 1998–2006	Club legend
(Italy) Vicenza	3	(Italy) Giulio Savoini	DF	1953–66	Posthumous
(Italy) Vicenza	25	(Italy) Piermario Morosini	MF	2007–09, 2011	Posthumous
(Jamaica) Montego Bay	2	(Jamaica) Stephen Malcolm	DF	1989–2001	Posthumous
(Jamaica) Reno	7	(Jamaica) Caple Donaldson	MF		Posthumous
(Japan) Fujieda MYFC	2	(Japan) Toshihide Saito	DF	2009–13	
(Japan) Thespa Kusatsu	31	(Japan) Ryosuke Okuno	DF	2002–03	
(Japan) Yokohama F. Marinos	3	(Japan) Naoki Matsuda	DF	1995–2010	Posthumous
(Kazakhstan) Astana	1	(Kazakhstan) Nenad Erić	GK	2011–20	
(Kazakhstan) Shakhtar Karagandy	14	(Kazakhstan) Andrei Finonchenko	FW	2000–16	
(Kosovo) Trepça '89	15	(Kosovo) Erion Kajtazi	MF	2022	Posthumous
Liberia	14	(Liberia) George Weah	FW	1987–2018	
(Libya) Al Ahly Tripoli	14	(Libya) Tarik El Taib	MF	1995–2001	
(Maldives) VB Addu FC	7	(Maldives) Ali Ashfaq	FW	2008–11	
(Malta) Valletta	7	(Malta) Gilbert Agius	MF	1990–2013	Club legend
(Malta) Lija	6	(Malta) Daniel Scerri	MF	2003–23	Club legend
(Mexico) Atlante	12	(Mexico) Félix Fernández	GK	1989–2003	
(Mexico) Guadalajara	8	(Mexico) Salvador Reyes	FW	1953–67, 2008	No. retired in 2013
(Mexico) Guadalajara	22	(Mexico) José Martínez González	MF	1970–81	Posthumous
(Mexico) Monterrey	26	(Chile) Humberto Suazo	FW	2007–14	Club legend
(Mexico) Monterrey	28	(Mexico) Jesús Arellano	FW	1992–97, 2000–11	(Note: The shirt is not fully retired. Arellano has given consent for his son to adopt the number 28.)
(Mexico) Pachuca	1	(Colombia) Miguel Calero	GK	2000–11	Posthumous (Note: Calero's number had been retired on 23 October 2011 after Calero's retirement as a professional player. Later his number was retired again posthumous when he died on 4 December 2012.)
(Mexico) Pachuca	17	(Costa Rica) Hernán Medford	FW	1994–97	
(Mexico) Pachuca	20	(Argentina) Pablo Gómez	FW	1999–2001	Posthumous
(Mexico) Pachuca	110	(Colombia) Andrés Chitiva	MF	2001–08, 2011	(Note: Chitiva was given number 100 in 2011 to commemorate the 110th. anniversary of the club. Chitiva was chosen to carry that number due to his career in the club.)
(Mexico) UANL	7	(Peru) Gerónimo Barbadillo	MF	1977–82	
(Morocco) Raja Casablanca	23	(Morocco) Zakaria Zerouali	DF	2011	Posthumous
(Netherlands) Ajax	14	(Netherlands) Johan Cruyff	FW	1957–73, 1981–83	No. retired in 2007
(Netherlands) Telstar	22	(Netherlands) Luciano van den Berg	DF	2004–05	Posthumous
(Netherlands) Utrecht	4	(France) David di Tommaso	DF	2004–05	Posthumous
(Netherlands) Vitesse	4	(Netherlands) Theo Bos	DF	1983–98	Posthumous
(New Zealand) Wellington Phoenix	22	(New Zealand) Andrew Durante	DF	2008–19	Club legend
(North Macedonia) FK Osogovo	7	(North Macedonia) Nikola Mantov	FW	?–1973	Posthumous
(Northern Ireland) Linfield	11	(Northern Ireland) Noel Bailie	DF	1986–2011	Club legend (Note: No. retired in 2011 to commemorate his world record of 1,013 senior appearances for the club.)
(Norway) Fredrikstad	8	(Norway) Dagfinn Enerly	MF	2004–05	
(Panama) Árabe Unido	21	(Panama) Amílcar Henríquez	MF	2003–08, 2016–17	Posthumous
(Panama) Chepo	77	(Panama) Jonathan Rodríguez	MF	2006–09	Posthumous
(Peru) Universitario	9	(Peru) Teodoro Fernández	FW	1930–53	
(Peru) Universitario	22	(Peru) José Luis Carranza	MF	1986–2004	
(Poland) Arka Gdynia	5	(Poland) Zbigniew Bieliński	DF	1966–81	Posthumous
(Poland) Cracovia	1	(Poland) (Vatican City) John Paul II	–	–	Club supporter (Note: Pope John Paul did not play for Cracovia but was a strong supporter of the team. The number was retired on 4 January 2005 during Pope's private audience with the players and staff of Cracovia in Vatican City, during which they gave him a shirt with his name and number.)
(Poland) GKS Katowice	9	(Poland) Jan Furtok	FW	1979–88, 1995–98	Club legend
(Poland) Lechia Gdańsk	24	(Poland) Mateusz Bąk	GK	2001–11, 2013–17	Posthumous
(Poland) Legia Warsaw	10	(Poland) Kazimierz Deyna	MF	1966–78	Posthumous
(Poland) Legia Warsaw	55	(Poland) Artur Jędrzejczyk	DF	2006–13, 2016, 2017–26	Club legend
(Poland) Piast Gliwice	21	(Spain) Gerard Badía	MF	2014–21	Club legend
(Poland) Pogoń Szczecin	5	(Brazil) Edi Andradina	FW	2005–07, 2011–13	Club legend
(Poland) Pogoń Szczecin	78	(Poland) Olgierd Moskalewicz	MF	1991–98, 2003–04, 2009–10	Club legend
(Poland) Radomiak Radom	9	(Brazil) Leândro Rossi	FW	2012–26	Club legend
(Poland) Raków Częstochowa	13	(Poland) Piotr Malinowski	MF	2015–21	Club legend
(Poland) Stal Kraśnik	5	(Poland) Damian Pietroń	DF	2002–03, 2010–12, 2013–19, 2022–25	Club legend
(Poland) Stomil Olsztyn	2	(Poland) Andrzej Biedrzycki	DF	1985–2001, 2002	Posthumous
(Poland) Widzew Łódź	11	(Poland) Włodzimierz Smolarek	FW	1974–78, 1980–86	Posthumous
(Poland) Zagłębie Lubin	10	(Poland) Paweł Piotrowski	MF	1996–2002	Posthumous
(Portugal) Benfica	29	(Hungary) Miklós Fehér	FW	2002–04	Posthumous
(Portugal) Boavista	29	(Portugal) Edu Ferreira	FW	2016–17	Posthumous (Note: Ferreira died on 23 December 2017, with the number retired on 3 January 2018. Leonardo Acevedo was the last player to hold the number, but changed to the 59 shirt midway through the 2017–18 season.)
(Romania) Argeș Pitești	10	(Romania) Nicolae Dobrin	MF	1962–81, 1982–83	Posthumous
(Romania) Dinamo București	11	(Romania) Cătălin Hîldan	MF	1994–2000	Posthumous
(Romania) Dinamo București	14	(Cameroon) Patrick Ekeng	MF	2016	Posthumous
(Romania) Dinamo București	25	(Romania) Ionel Dănciulescu	MF	1995–97, 2002–09, 2010–13	Club Legend
(Romania) Steaua București	7	(Romania) Marius Lăcătuș	FW	1983–90, 1993–2000	No. retired on 7 July 2021
(Russia) CSKA Moscow	16	(Ukraine) Serhiy Perkhun	GK	2001	Posthumous
(Russia) Rubin Kazan	17	(Russia) Lenar Gilmullin	DF	2003–07	Posthumous
(Russia) Rubin Kazan	61	(Turkey) Gökdeniz Karadeniz	MF	2008–18	Club legend
(Russia) Ural	23	(Russia) Pyotr Hrustovsky	FW	1999, 2001–03	Posthumous
(Scotland) Heart of Midlothian	26	(Lithuania) Marius Žaliūkas	DF	2007–13	Posthumous
(El Salvador) FAS	10	(El Salvador) Mágico González	FW	1977–82, 1991–99	Club legend
(El Salvador) Municipal Limeño	11	(El Salvador) Oscar Armando Díaz	FW	?–1998	Posthumous
(Saudi Arabia) Najran SC	20	(Saudi Arabia) Al Hasan Al-Yami	FW	1991–96, 2005–10	No. retired in 2012
(Serbia) Partizan Belgrade	22	(Serbia) Saša Ilić	MF	1996–2005, 2010–19	Club legend
(Serbia) Radnički Niš	10	(Serbia) Ivan Krstić	MF	1999–2000	Posthumous
(Serbia) Red Star Belgrade	11	(Serbia) Dragan Džajić	MF	1963–75, 1977–78	Club legend
(Serbia) Red Star Belgrade	26	(Serbia) Goran Gogić	MF	2013−14	Posthumous
(Slovakia) Spartak Trnava	9	(Slovakia) Ladislav Kuna	MF	1964–80	Posthumous
(Slovenia) Maribor	19	(Croatia) Stipe Balajić	DF/MF	1998–2005	Club legend
(Slovenia) Maribor	33	(Slovenia) Jasmin Handanović	GK	2011–21	Club legend
(Slovenia) Maribor	9	(Brazil) Marcos Tavares	FW	2008–22	Club legend
(South Africa) Ajax Cape Town	21	(South Africa) Cecil Lolo	DF	2009–15	Posthumous
(South Africa) Orlando Pirates	1	(South Africa) Senzo Meyiwa	GK	2005–14	Posthumous
(South Africa) Orlando Pirates	10	(South Africa) Jomo Sono	MF		Club legend
(South Africa) Orlando Pirates	13	(South Africa) Clifford Moleko	MF	1997–98	Posthumous
(South Africa) Orlando Pirates	22	(South Africa) Lesley Manyathela	FW	2000–03	Posthumous
(South Korea) Busan Daewoo Royals	16	(South Korea) Kim Joo-sung	MF	1987–92, 1994–99	Club legend
(South Korea) FC Seoul	13	(South Korea) Go Yo-han	MF	2006–23	Club legend
(South Korea) Jeonbuk Hyundai Motors	20	(South Korea) Lee Dong-gook	FW	2009–20	Club legend
(South Korea) Jeonbuk Hyundai Motors	25	(South Korea) Choi Chul-soon	DF	2006–12, 2014–25	Club legend
(South Korea) Suwon Samsung Bluewings	38	(South Korea) Yoon Sung-hyo	MF	1996–98, 2000	Club legend
(Spain) Córdoba	8	(Spain) Juanín	FW	1960–70	Posthumous
(Spain) Espanyol	21	(Spain) Daniel Jarque	DF	2002–09	Posthumous
(Spain) Extremadura	19	(Spain) Jose Antonio Reyes	FW	2019	Posthumous
(Spain) Real Betis	26	(Spain) Miki Roqué	DF	2010–12	Posthumous
(Sweden) Assyriska FF	18	(Sweden) Eddie Moussa	FW	2001–10	Posthumous
(Sweden) Helsingborgs IF	17	(Sweden) Henrik Larsson	FW	1992–93, 2006–09	
(Sweden) Kalmar FF	15	(Sweden) Johny Erlandsson	MF	1973–88	Club legend (Note: Previous record holder for most appearances)
(Sweden) Kalmar FF	8	(Sweden) Henrik Rydström	MF	1993–2013	Club legend (Note: Current record holder for most appearances and current manager)
(Sweden) Norrköping	18	(Iceland) Stefán Þórðarson	FW	2004–07, 2009	Club legend (Note: The shirt was worn by Þórðarson during his comeback for the club during the 2009 season. Has been worn again since 2017.)
(Sweden) Umeå IK	6	(Sweden) Malin Moström	MF	1995–2007	Club legend (Note: The shirt was worn by Moström during her comeback at the club during the 2007 season.)
(Switzerland) Basel	2	(Switzerland) Massimo Ceccaroni	DF	1987–2002	
(Switzerland) Basel	20	(Switzerland) Fabian Frei	MF	2007–15, 2018–24	
(Switzerland) St. Gallen	17	(Switzerland) Marc Zellweger	DF	1994–2001, 2003–10	
(Thailand) TOT-CAT	19	(Thailand) Chanont Wong-aree	DF	2009–10	Posthumous
(Tunisia) Espérance de Tunis	5	(Tunisia) Hédi Berkhissa	DF	1991–97	Posthumous
(Turkey) Alanyaspor	90	(Czech Republic) Josef Šural	FW	2019	Posthumous
(Turkey) İstanbul Başakşehir	12	(Turkey) Recep Tayyip Erdoğan	–	–	Significant supporter (Note: Erdogan was not a player but a politician (Turkish prime minister, later president) and long-time supporter of the club. The number 12 refers to the "12th man".)
(Turkey) Konyaspor	6	(Turkey) Ahmet Yılmaz Çalık	DF	2013–22	Posthumous
(United States) Baltimore Blast	3	(Canada) Mike Reynolds	DF	1986–91	Posthumous
(United States) Colorado Rapids	17	(United States) Marcelo Balboa	DF	1996–2001	No. retired in 2025
(United States) Colorado Rapids	25	(United States) Pablo Mastroeni	MF	2002–13	No. retired in 2021
(United States) Eastern Illinois men's	19	(United States) Erik Proffitt	MF	1987–88	Posthumous (Note: Proffitt died in April 1989 after contracting spinal meningitis. He was 20 years old.)
(United States) Hofstra men's	5	(United States) Gary Flood	DF	2003–06	No. retired in 2008
(United States) Hofstra men's	9	(England) Michael Todd	FW	2003–06	No. retired in 2008
(United States) Hofstra women's	17	(United States) Tiffany Yovino	FW	2007–10	No. retired in 2011
(United States) Hofstra women's	20	(United States) Sue Weber	DF	2005–07	No. retired in 2008
(United States) FC Kansas City	12	(United States) Lauren Holiday	MF	2013–15	
(United States) New York Cosmos	9	(Italy) Giorgio Chinaglia	FW	1976–83	Posthumous (Note: Number retired in June 2014 by the second incarnation of the Cosmos and remained retired by the current franchise.)
(United States) New York Cosmos	10	(Brazil) Pelé	FW	1975–77	Club legend (Note: Number retired by the original New York Cosmos on 1 October 1977, at half-time of his testimonial match. The number remained retired by the second incarnation of the club and then by the current franchise.)
(United States) New York Red Bulls	99	(England) Bradley Wright-Phillips	FW	2013–19	Club legend (Note: Wright-Phillips left the New York Red Bulls in 2019, but the franchise had announced his number would be retired in August 2018)
(United States) Portland Timbers	3	(England) Clive Charles	DF	1978–81	Posthumous (Note: Number retired on 23 August 2003)
(United States) Portland Thorns	12	(Canada) Christine Sinclair	FW	2013–24	Club legend
(United States) Rochester New York	14	(Trinidad and Tobago) Mickey Trotman	MF	2001	Posthumous
(United States) Rochester New York	19	(United States) Doug Miller	FW	1996–99, 2003–06	No. retired in 2006
(United States) San Diego Wave	13	(United States) Alex Morgan	FW	2022–24	
(United States) Tampa Bay Rowdies	6	(South Africa) Mike Connell	DF	1975–84	No. retired in 2013
(United States) Tampa Bay Rowdies	12	(United States) Perry Van der Beck	MF	1978–82, 1984, 1991–93	Club legend (Note: Number retired on 1 October 2010 by Tampa Bay before they rebranded into the second incarnation of the Rowdies.)
(United States) UMass women's	1	(United States) Briana Scurry	GK	1990–93	Club legend
(United States) UMass women's	2	(United States) April Kater	FW	1987–90	Club legend
(Ukraine) Shakhtar Donetsk	33	(Croatia) Darijo Srna	DF	2003–18	Club legend
(Ukraine) Zorya Luhansk	33	(Ukraine) Maksym Bilyi	MF	2010–13	Posthumous
(Vietnam) Hoàng Anh Gia Lai	13	(Thailand) Kiatisuk Senamuang	FW	2001–06	Club legend
(Vietnam) Hoàng Anh Gia Lai	14	(Vietnam) Võ Bá Khôi	DF	2003–06	Posthumous
(Wales) Cardiff City	7	(England) Peter Whittingham	MF	2007–17	Posthumous
(Wales) Swansea City	40	(Austria) Besian Idrizaj	FW	2009–10	Posthumous

== Special cases ==
Team	No.	Player	Pos.	Tenure	Notes
Argentina national team	10	(Argentina) Diego Maradona	MF	1977–94	Retired and re-issued (Note: The number 10 had been retired by the Argentine Football Association in October 2001 to honour Maradona. Before the 2002 World Cup, the AFA submitted a squad list of 23 players for the tournament, listed 1 through 24, with the number 10 omitted. FIFA rejected Argentina's list, and the governing body's president, Sepp Blatter suggested the number 10 shirt be instead given to the team's third-choice goalkeeper, Roberto Bonano. AFA ultimately submitted a revised list with Ariel Ortega, originally listed as number 23, as the number 10. The number 10 has been worn by other players since, most notably by Lionel Messi, whom Maradona considered "his successor".)
(Argentina) River Plate	12	–	–	1949–2013 (Note: Period counts since squad numbers were established as mandatory in Argentina.)	Unofficially retired (Note: Following an initiative by then manager Ramón Díaz, the club decided to put this number out of circulation in 2013 because arch-rival Boca Juniors fans are nicknamed "La 12". Due to Conmebol rules (that forced players to wear consecutive numbers) the #12 was occasionally re-issued for international competitions. Nevertheless, the number has not been issued since 2024 neither in domestic nor in international competitions.)
(Australia) Sydney FC	15	(Northern Ireland) Terry McFlynn	MF	2005–14	Unofficially retired (Note: Sydney FC have not officially retired the number 15 shirt, but it has not been allocated to another player since McFlynn retired from professional football in 2014. McFlynn also held a staffing position with Sydney FC from 2014 until 2019.)
(Austria) Rapid Wien	5	(Austria) Peter Schöttel	DF	1986–2001	Temporarily retired (Note: Schottel's number was temporarily retired for at least ten years. In 2013, it was reactivated and given to Thanos Petsos.)
(Austria) Rapid Wien	11	(Germany) Steffen Hofmann	MF	2002–18	Retired for at least eleven years
(Brazil) Palmeiras	12	(Brazil) Marcos	GK	1993–2012	Retired for GK only (Note: Outfield players are allowed to use the number.)
(Brazil) Santos	10	(Brazil) Pelé	FW	1956–74	Temporarily retired (Note: The number 10 was temporarily retired in honor renowned striker Pelé following the club's relegation from the Campeonato Brasileiro Série A after 111 years.)
(Colombia) Santa Fe	23	(Colombia) Léider Preciado	FW	1995–98, 2000–01, 2004–08, 2011	Temporarily retired (Note: The number was out of circulation for a period of 23 months (starting May 2012) in honor of the second top scorer in the history of the club.)
(Czech Republic) Slavia Prague	7	(Czech Republic) Stanislav Vlček	FW	2004–07, 2009–13	Not fully retired (Note: Rather than retiring the number, the club opted to freeze the number for any future player that wants it, provided that the applying player meets 7 game achievements. Among those are scoring 3 goals overall against Sparta Prague, being nominated for his national team, winning the trophy for top goalscorer and others. Even though Milan Škoda met the requirements in the 2016–17 season, he opted to keep his number 21. The 7 was eventually given to Danny upon him joining the team for 2017-18 season. Vlček gave his consent and Danny pledged to work to meet the remaining criteria.)
Ecuador national team	11	(Ecuador) Christian Benítez	FW	2005–13	Retired and re-issued (Note: The number 10 had been retired by the FEF in 2013 to honour Benítez, died at 27 years old from a cardiac arrest. Nevertheless, the number had to be reissued due to FIFA rules for the 2014 World Cup that stated squads to be numbered 1–23. For that occasion, Felipe Caicedo was given number 11.)
(England) Bradford City	8	(England) Tomi Solomon		2019–21	Retired in academy (Note: Bradford retired number 8 across all age groups of the Bradford Academy, after the tragic death of 13-yo player Tomi Solomon, stating that it shall 'remain with him forever'. Solomon drowned in River Calder in 2021. The decision did not include the senior squad, where the number remain in use.)
(England) Portsmouth	13	(England) Aaron Flahavan	GK	1994–2001	Temporarily retired (Note: Following Flahavan's death in a car accident in August 2001, Portsmouth and his first club, Southampton, retired their number 1 shirts for the 2001–02 season as a mark of respect. From the 2003–04 season, Portsmouth retired the number 13 shirt, as this was the number Flahavan wore during the majority of his time at the club. Number 13 remained unused until 2011, when it was allocated to goalkeeper Stephen Henderson, and it has been reissued since.)
(England) Leeds United	17	(Italy) Massimo Cellino	–	2014	Temporarily retired (Note: Leeds retired the number 17 shirt due to Italian chairman Massimo Cellino's superstitions, as 17 is considered an unlucky number in Italian culture. Number was re-issued in July 2019.)
(England) Exeter City	9	(England) Adam Stansfield	FW	2006–10	Temporarily retired (Note: The club retired the number 9 for nine seasons after the striker died of cancer on 10 August 2010. The number returned to use in 2020, following the arrival of Stansfield’s son, Jay Stansfield, at Exeter City. As of 2023, Jay Stansfield continues to wear the number 9 shirt.)
(England) Wolverhampton	1	(Nigeria) Carl Ikeme	GK	2003–18	Temporarily retired (Note: Carl Ikeme retired from professional football before the 2018–2019 season after complete remission from acute leukaemia and the club decided to leave the jersey –previously worn by Ikeme– vacant, with newly signed Rui Patrício unusually wearing the number 11 and the other team goalkeepers wearing numbers ending in "1". In 2021, the number was reissued following the signing of new goalkeeper José Sá, and after Ikeme stated publicly that he wished for someone to take the number.)
(Finland) FC Haka	14	(Russia) Valeri Popovitch	FW	1994–2008	Partially retired (Note: First ever retired shirt number in the history of Finnish football is ex-Haka's Valeri Popovitch's number 14. Popovitch has stated that his sons, who are still playing for Haka's junior teams, can wear the legendary number if they want.)
(France) Lyon	16	(France) Luc Borrelli	GK	1998–99	Temporarily retired (Note: Posthumous – returned to use in 2011.)
(France) Lyon	17	(Cameroon) Marc-Vivien Foé	MF	2000–03	Temporarily retired (Note: Posthumous – returned to use in 2008.)
(Germany) 1. FC Köln	10	(Germany) Lukas Podolski	MF	2002–06, 2009–12	Temporarily retired (Note: The club had announced that the number would remain out of circulation as long as Podolski is playing football on a professional level. Nevertheless, the #10 was given to Patrick Helmes in July 2014.)
(Germany) Schalke 04	7	(Spain) Raúl	FW	2010–12	Temporarily retired (Note: At the time Raúl left the club, the team intended to retire the jersey indefinitely. However, the retirement of this shirt only lasted one year; with Max Meyer wearing it from 2013 to 2018.)
(Honduras) Motagua	16	(Honduras) Edy Vásquez	MF	2003–07	Temporarily retired (Note: Posthumous, retired from 2007 to 2009.)
(Hungary) Diósgyőri VTK	77	(Spain) José Juan Luque	MF	1996–2013	Temporarily retired (Note: Retired on 2 June 2013 in respect of Luque being the most notable player in the DVTK history. His number was retired for ten years.)
(Indonesia) PSIM Yogyakarta	91	(Brazil) Rafinha	FW	2024–25	Temporarily retired (Note: Rafina left PSIM for PSIS Semarang on 29 December 2025 in a loan deal with an option to buy. However, seeing that he had contributed massively in PSIM's promotion back to the top-flight after 18 years away, the PSIM management has decided to retire his number with nobody else other than him being allowed to use the number again.)
(Iran) Persepolis	7	(Iran) Ali Parvin	MF	1970–87	Partially retired (Note: The shirt was retired after Parvin's retirement, but Parvin gave the shirt to player Hamid Estili and the shirt has since not been retired permanently.)
(Israel) Maccabi Tel Aviv	12	(Israel) Meni Levi	DF	2000–02	Unofficially retired (Note: During a game between Maccabi Tel Aviv and Beitar Jerusalem, Levi chest-controlled and kicked the ball, ran back to defend, then collapsed. He returned to his feet, and then collapsed a second time. He was subsequently on a life-support machine, and has since returned home. The club claims that the number 12 is unofficially reserved for the fans.)
(Italy) Livorno	10	(Italy) Igor Protti	FW	1985–88, 1999–2005	Temporarily retired (Note: In December 2005, Livorno officially retired the #10 jersey. However, Protti, who led the forward line and captained his side in two promotions from Serie C1 to Serie A, quickly gaining a reputation as a fan favourite, announced his willingness to see the #10 number reissued to another player, in order to "give anybody back a dream to dress it one day." This was made effective starting from the 2007–08 season, in which Francesco Tavano played with the #10 number.)
(Italy) Milan	3	(Italy) Paolo Maldini	DF	1984–2009	Partially retired (Note: Maldini's number was not fully retired so he gave consent for his sons to adopt the number 3 shirt if either of them play professionally for the club.)
(Italy) Roma	6	(Brazil) Aldair	DF	1990–2003	Temporarily retired (Note: The shirt number had been retired by the club when the player left the club in 2003. When Kevin Strootman joined Roma in 2013, he asked for permission to wear number 6. The club approved the request after Aldair gave his consent. The number remained in use and has given to other players since.)
(Japan) Sagan Tosu	17	(Japan) Sakata Michitaka	–	2001–	Key figure (Note: The shirt was retired posthumously, to honour Michikata who played a key role in establishment of former Tosu Futures and their revival as Sagan Tosu, and who died due to kidney cancer on 7 January 2000. Number 17, derived from the day of his death, was selected to be retired. The number would later also be dedicated to the club's fans, thus they have not retired squad number 12 like most Japanese League teams.)
(Kosovo) Llapi	9	(Socialist Federal Republic of Yugoslavia) Fadil Vokrri	FW	1976–79	Retired and re-issued
(Lebanon) Akhaa Ahli Aley	20	(Lebanon) Mohamed Atwi	MF	2018–20	Temporarily retired (Note: Akhaa Ahli Aley have retired the squad number 20, in honour of Atwi's death in 2020 due to a stray bullet in the head. The club has retired the number for two seasons—from 2020 to 2022—the duration in which Atwi stayed at the club.)
(Mexico) Guadalajara	11	(Mexico) Ramón Morales	MF	1998–2011 (Note: Career as player. Since 2013, Morales became part of the coaching staff.)	Unofficially retired (Note: The shirt was never officially retired, but it was not issued out of American competitions for the time between Morales' exit and his return as a coach. All players intending to wear the jersey have to ask for Morales' consent. It is now being worn by Isaác Brizuela.)
(Mexico) Pachuca	8	(Mexico) Gabriel Caballero	MF/FW	1998–2009	Temporarily retired (Note: Caballero's number was just temporarily retired for five years. After that period, it was reactivated and given to Hirving Lozano in 2014.)
(Mexico) Pumas UNAM	12	(Mexico) Sergio Bernal	GK	1989–2001, 2003–10	Retired and re-issued
(Netherlands) Ajax	34	(Netherlands) Abdelhak Nouri	MF	2016–17	Unofficially retired (Note: Nouri collapsed on the pitch after suffering severe cardiac arrhythmia, which forced him to leave football. Number 34 has not been issued since then.)
(Norway) Stabæk	7	(Norway) Christer Basma	DF	1995–98	Temporarily retired (Note: The club had retired the number to honor Basma's career at Stabæk. However, the retirement was revoked after 2004 season and the number given to Henning Hauger.)
(Portugal) Benfica	10	(Portugal) Fernando Chalana	MF	1976–84, 1987–90	Temporarily retired (Note: After the death of Chalana, the club announced the number 10 jersey would become vacated for the 2022–23 season.)
(Portugal) União Leiria	10	(Portugal) Hugo Cunha	MF	2004–05	Temporarily retired (Note: Posthumous; has been worn again since 2009.)
(Scotland) Dunfermline Athletic	4	(Scotland) Norrie McCathie	DF	1981–96	Temporarily retired (Note: The club retired the number after club captain McCathie was found dead in his home on 8 January 1996, as a result of Carbon monoxide poisoning. At that time, Scottish League clubs used shirt numbered from 1 to 11, so for the remainder of the 1995–96 season, 12 was used instead. However, the number was not retired permanently, and has been re-issued since.)
(Scotland) Motherwell	10	(Scotland) Phil O'Donnell	MF	1990–94, 2004–07	Unofficially retired (Note: O'Donnell collapsed while playing for Motherwell against Dundee United in 2007. He was pronounced dead at Wishaw General Hospital. The number 10 shirt was worn by his nephew David Clarkson during the 2008–09 season. Since Clarkson left in June 2009, it has not been retired, but has not been issued to any subsequent player.)
(South Africa) Orlando Pirates	22	(South Africa) Lesley Manyathela	FW	2000−03	Occasionally re-issued (Note: The club retired the number 22 after Manyathela died in a car crash in August 2003. However, Confederation of African Football rules state that shirts must be numbered 1–30 in continental club competitions, so Pirates has re-issued it in those special cases.)
(Spain) Barcelona	21	(Spain) Luis Enrique	MF	1996–2004	Temporarily retired (Note: Luis Enrique joined the club as a free agent from eternal rivals Real Madrid, spending eight years at Barcelona, even becoming captain of the team. The shirt was retired for just two years (2004–06), since La Liga did not allow numbers to be retired permanently. The number 21 shirt was awarded to Lilian Thuram in 2006. Since his arrival at the club in 2020, Frenkie de Jong currently holds the number 21 shirt, taking it from Carles Aleñá.)
(Spain) Oviedo	10	(Slovakia) Peter Dubovský	MF	1995–2000	Temporarily retired (Note: The Spanish Football League allowed Oviedo to retire number 10 just for the 2000–01 season, as an exception to its rules. At the end of the season, number 10 was re-issued.)
(Spain) Sevilla	16	(Spain) Antonio Puerta	DF	2004–07	Temporarily retired (Note: The number was temporarily retired after Puerta died of a cardiac arrest on the first match day in La Liga 2007–2008. However, Spanish Football Federation rules state that clubs must use number 1 to 25 for their regular squad, and as a result, David Prieto wore the number in 2008 in honour of his friend. It has become a club policy to reserve number 16 for players coming from the youth academy as a tribute to Puerta, who was a youth system product. Exceptions have been made when 16 was the only jersey number available.)
(Sweden) Östers IF	6	(Sweden) Mario Vasilj	DF	2006–18	Temporarily retired (Note: Retired for six years.)
(Sweden) Hammarby IF	10	(Sweden) Kennedy Bakircioglu	MF	1999–2003, 2012–18	Temporarily retired (Note: Retired for ten years between 2019 and 2028.)
(Turkey) Galatasaray	3	(Turkey) Bülent Korkmaz	DF	1984–2005	Temporarily retired (Note: Despite the club announcing the retirement of the number, it has been re-issued.)
(United States) LA Galaxy	13	(United States) Cobi Jones	MF	1996–2007	Unofficially retired (Note: The number was not officially retired by the Galaxy but had not been worn since Jones retired. In 2017, it was given to Jermaine Jones.)
(United States) North Carolina women's	19	(United States) Mia Hamm	FW	1989–93	Retired and re-issued
(United States) Real Salt Lake	9	(United States) Jason Kreis	MF/FW	2005–07	Retired and re-issued (Note: Jason Kreis's number 9 was not worn by RSL players after the time of its retirement in 2011. However, in 2019, when the club decided to retire Javier Morales's number 11, Kreis pleaded with the club to recirculate his number 9. As a result, both number 9 and number 11 are still circulated numbers for the club. Kreis and Morales's names and numbers are "retired" and displayed prominently above the player's tunnel on the west concourse of America First Field.)
(United States) Real Salt Lake	11	(Argentina) Javier Morales	MF	2007–16	Retired and re-issued
(United States) Tampa Bay Rowdies	7	(South Africa) Steve Wegerle	FW	1977–81, 1984, 1988–90	Temporarily retired (Note: Although his number had been retired by the original franchise in 1989, the current team has reissued it.)

== Dedication to fans ==
=== Number 12 ===
Some clubs dedicate a number to their fans, and do not issue it to any player. The most common number for this practice is 12, from descriptions of the fans as "the twelfth man". Clubs and teams that do not give the '12' to any player include:

- (Albania) Tirana
- (Australia) Melbourne Victory
- (Australia) Perth Glory
- (Austria) Rapid Vienna
- (Belgium) Club Brugge
- (Belgium) Genk
- (Bosnia and Herzegovina) Sarajevo
- (Brazil) Atlético Mineiro (Note: Despite having their number "12" retired, Brazilian clubs have had to re-issue them for CONMEBOL competitions such as Copa Libertadores, where the squads must be numbered from 1 to 25 consecutively, although that rule changed and teams can use arbitrary numbers from 1 to 50.)
- (Brazil) Avaí
- (Brazil) Flamengo
- (Bulgaria) Botev Plovdiv
- (Canada) CF Montréal
- (China) Beijing Guoan
- (China) Changchun Yatai
- (China) Chongqing Tonglianglong
- (China) Heilongjiang Ice City
- (China) Shaanxi Union
- (China) Shandong Taishan
- (China) Shanghai Shenhua
- (Croatia) Hajduk Split
- (Cyprus) Omonia
- (Czech Republic) Sparta Prague
- (Denmark) AGF
- (Denmark) OB
- (England) Bristol Rovers
- (England) Gillingham
- (England) Oxford United
- (England) Oldham Athletic
- (England) Plymouth Argyle
- (England) Portsmouth
- (Estonia) Flora
- (France) Lens
- (Finland) Mikkelin Palloilijat
- (Germany) Arminia Bielefeld
- (Germany) Bayern Munich
- (Germany) Borussia Mönchengladbach
- (Germany) Rot-Weiss Essen
- (Germany) TuS Koblenz
- (Germany) Werder Bremen
- (Greece) PAOK
- (Hungary) Ferencváros
- (Hungary) Újpest
- (India) Kerala Blasters
- (Indonesia) Persija Jakarta
- (Indonesia) Persis Solo
- (Iran) Foolad
- (Iran) Persepolis
- (Republic of Ireland) Cork City
- (Republic of Ireland) Shamrock Rovers
- (Italy) Atalanta
- (Italy) Cesena
- (Italy) Genoa
- (Italy) Lazio
- (Italy) Palermo
- (Italy) Parma
- (Italy) Torino
- (South Korea) FC Seoul
- (South Korea) Jeonbuk Hyundai Motors FC
- (South Korea) Incheon United
- (South Korea) Jeju United FC
- (South Korea) Seoul United
- (Lithuania) FK Ekranas
- (Malaysia) Terengganu
- (Malta) Valletta
- (Mexico) Monterrey
- (Mexico) Tigres UANL
- (Mexico) Guadalajara
- (Myanmar) Yangon United
- (Myanmar) Yadanarbon
- (Myanmar) Thanlyin Technological University
- (Netherlands) PSV Eindhoven
- (Netherlands) Feyenoord
- (Netherlands) Vitesse
- (Netherlands) PEC Zwolle
- (Netherlands) Roda JC Kerkrade
- (Norway) IK Start
- (Norway) Vålerenga
- (Poland) Pogoń Szczecin
- (Poland) Lech Poznań
- (Poland) Polonia Warsaw
- (Portugal) Sporting CP
- (Portugal) Vitória de Guimarães
- (Romania) Dinamo București
- (Romania) Rapid București
- (Russia) Zenit Saint Petersburg
- (Russia) CSKA Moscow
- (Scotland) Aberdeen
- (Scotland) Rangers
- (Serbia) Red Star Belgrade
- (Sweden) Hammarby IF
- (Sweden) Malmö FF
- (Sweden) GIF Sundsvall
- (Switzerland) Basel
- (Tunisia) Club Africain
- (Thailand) Bangkok United
- (Thailand) Chonburi
- (Thailand) BEC Tero Sasana
- (Thailand) Muangthong United
- (Thailand) Port
- (Thailand) Buriram United
- (Turkey) Fenerbahçe
- (Turkey) Sivasspor
- (Ukraine) Dynamo Kyiv
- (Vietnam) Hà Nội FC

=== Other numbers retired ===
- 1 – AIK, Djurgården IF, and PSIM Yogyakarta reserve the number for their supporters.
- 7 – Paysandu reserve the number for their supporters.
- 11 – Indy Eleven reserve the number for their supporters.
- 13 – Reading and Bryne reserve the number for their supporters, Panathinaikos reserve the number in honour of Gate 13, the ultras based in the respective gate in home matches. Between 2002 and 2007 Norwich City reserved the number 13 shirt for "the fans" after which it was worn by Declan Rudd while Shrewsbury Town reserve the number 13 shirt for the fan who wins a pre-season competition.
- 16 – Bursaspor reserve the number for their supporters.
- 17 – Atlanta United FC reserve the number for their supporters and to reference their inaugural season in Major League Soccer. For the 2021 MLS season, the club also reserved the number 44 as part of a tribute by Atlanta-area sports teams in memoriam of Henry Aaron of the local MLB club, who died on 22 January 2021.
- 17 – Sagan Tosu retired the number in dedication to their fans.
- 27 – Bournemouth use squad number for the Steve Fletcher Stand which houses the large majority of hardcore supporters, the number 50 for "12th man" and the number 99 shirt for their mascot, Cherry Bear.
- 33 – Remo reserve the number for their supporters.
- 40 – Oldham Athletic reserve the number for their fans.
- 55 – Rochdale retired the number on 13 January 2017 in honour of five-year old Joshua McCormack who died of cancer.
- 58 – Portsmouth retired the number for their mascot Nelson, with Nelson’s name and number appearing on club issued match day programmes
- 79 – APOEL have reserved the shirt number in honour of PAN.SY.FI. (APOEL Ultras), to denote the year the group was founded, 1979.
- 88 – Barito Putera have reserved the shirt number to honor the identity of the team which was formed in 1988.
