= Ahmad Jalloul =

Lebanese footballer (born 1992)

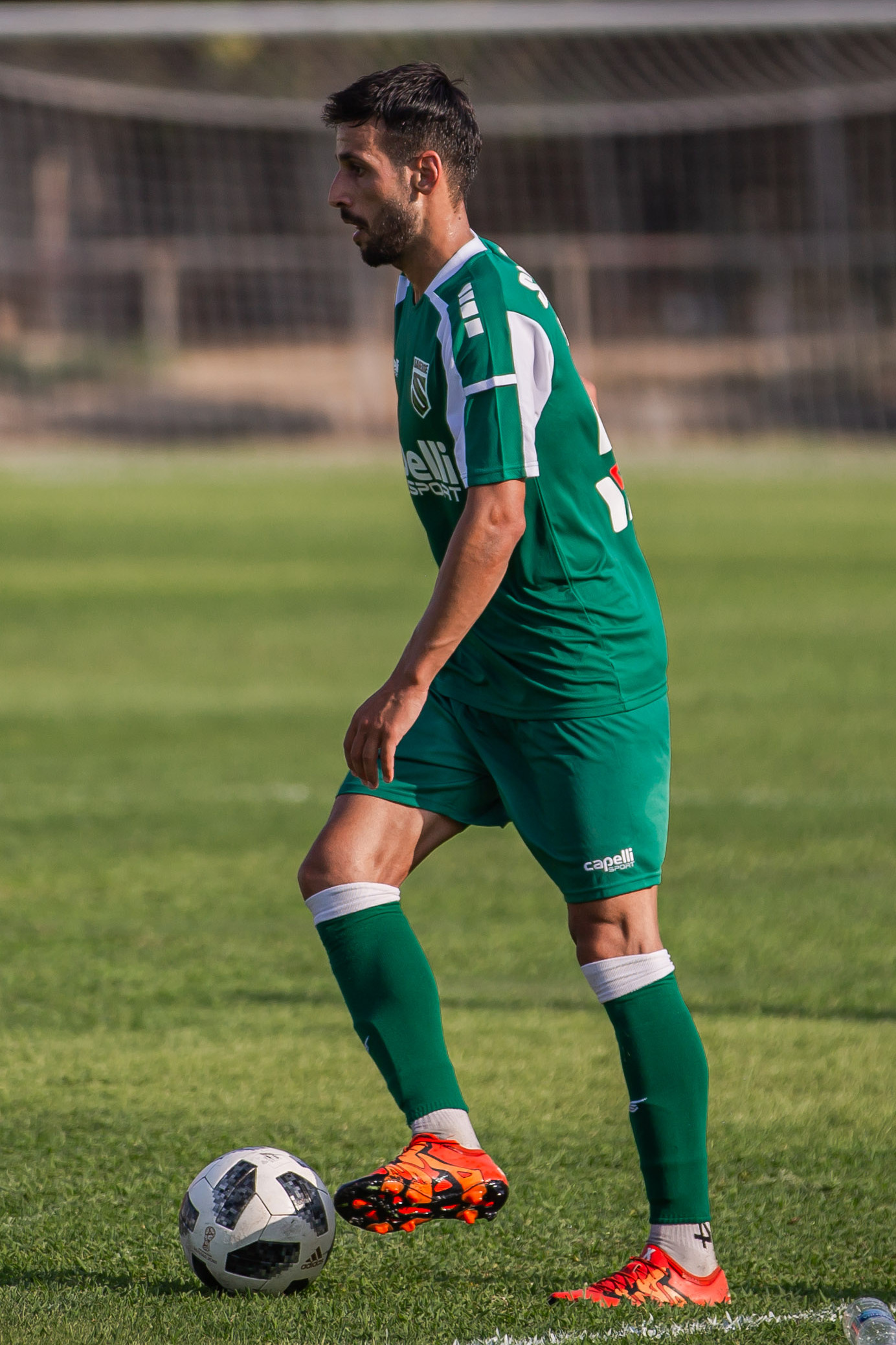
- Jalloul with Sagesse in 2023

Personal information
- Full name: Ahmad Adnan Jalloul
- Date of birth: 23 January 1992 (age 34)
- Place of birth: Bourj el-Barajneh, Lebanon
- Height: 1.81 m (5 ft 11 in)
- Position: Midfielder

Team information
- Current team: Sagesse
- Number: 20

Senior career*
Years	Team	Apps	(Gls)
2011–2017	Safa	84	(1)
2017–2019	Nejmeh	24	(0)
2019–2023	Safa	60	(7)
2023–	Sagesse	69	(3)

International career
2015–2019	Lebanon	14	(0)
- * Club domestic league appearances and goals as of 8 July 2026

Ahmad Adnan Jalloul (Arabic: أحمد عدنان جلول, Lebanese Arabic pronunciation: [ˈʔaħmad ʒalˈluːl]; born 23 January 1992) is a Lebanese footballer who plays as a midfielder for Lebanese Premier League club Sagesse.

== Club career ==
Jalloul joined Sagesse from Safa ahead of the 2023–24 Lebanese Premier League season. He stated the presence of coach Emile Rustom as the driving factor behind the transfer.

== Career statistics ==
=== International ===
As of match played 8 August 2019

Appearances and goals by national team and year
National team	Year	Apps	Goals
Lebanon	2015	2	0
Lebanon	2016	7	0
Lebanon	2017	3	0
Lebanon	2018	0	0
Lebanon	2019	2	0
Total		14	0

== Honours ==
Safa

- Lebanese Premier League: 2011–12, 2012–13, 2015–16
- Lebanese FA Cup: 2012–13
- Lebanese Elite Cup: 2012
- Lebanese Super Cup: 2013

Nejmeh

- Lebanese Elite Cup: 2017, 2018

Safa

- Lebanese Challenge Cup runner-up: 2022

Individual

- Lebanese Premier League Team of the Season: 2015–16
