= 2022 Lebanese Challenge Cup =

2022 edition of the Lebanese Challenge Cup

Tournament details
- Country: Lebanon
- Dates: 28 July – 21 August
- Teams: 6

Final positions
- Champions: Akhaa Ahli Aley (1st title)
- Runners-up: Safa

Tournament statistics
- Matches played: 9
- Goals scored: 17 (1.89 per match)
- Top goal scorer: Hassan Abdallah Hazime (3 goals)

The 2022 Lebanese Challenge Cup was the 9th edition of the Lebanese Challenge Cup. The competition included the teams placed between 7th and 10th in the 2021–22 Lebanese Premier League, and the two newly promoted teams from the 2021–22 Lebanese Second Division.

The first matchday was played on 28 July, one day after the start of the 2022 Lebanese Elite Cup. The final was played on 21 August, with Akhaa Ahli Aley beating their rivals Safa 1–0.

== Group stage ==
=== Group A ===
| Pos | Team | Pld | W | D | L | GF | GA | GD | Pts | Qualification |
|---|---|---|---|---|---|---|---|---|---|---|
| 1 | Sagesse | 2 | 1 | 1 | 0 | 4 | 1 | +3 | 4 | Advance to semi-finals |
| 2 | Salam Zgharta | 2 | 1 | 0 | 1 | 3 | 3 | 0 | 3 | Advance to semi-finals |
| 3 | Chabab Ghazieh | 2 | 0 | 1 | 1 | 1 | 4 | −3 | 1 | |

Source: Global Sports Archive
28 July 2022
17:00 UTC+3

| Salam Zgharta | 0–3 | Sagesse |
|---|---|---|
| | Report | Al-Mel 38', 40'; Al Jurdi 89' |

Tripoli Municipal Stadium, Tripoli
Referee: Kazem El Khansa

3 August 2022
17:00 UTC+3

| Salam Zgharta | 3–0 awd. | Chabab Ghazieh |
|---|---|---|
| | Report | Gideou 78'; Ghaddar 90+5' |

Al Ahed Stadium, Beirut
Referee: Mostafa Saifan

9 August 2022
17:00 UTC+3

| Sagesse | 1–1 | Chabab Ghazieh |
|---|---|---|
| Abou Fakher 38' | Report | Reda 10' |

Al Ahed Stadium, Beirut
Referee: Ahmad Damaj

=== Group B ===
| Pos | Team | Pld | W | D | L | GF | GA | GD | Pts | Qualification |
|---|---|---|---|---|---|---|---|---|---|---|
| 1 | Safa | 2 | 1 | 1 | 0 | 2 | 1 | +1 | 4 | Advance to semi-finals |
| 2 | Akhaa Ahli Aley | 2 | 0 | 2 | 0 | 2 | 2 | 0 | 2 | Advance to semi-finals |
| 3 | Tripoli | 2 | 0 | 1 | 1 | 1 | 2 | −1 | 1 | |

Source: Global Sports Archive
28 July 2022
16:00 UTC+3

| Akhaa Ahli Aley | 1–1 | Tripoli |
|---|---|---|
| Al Massri 57' | Report | Moghrabi 85' |

Fouad Chehab Stadium, Jounieh
Referee: Wael Haidar

3 August 2022
16:00 UTC+3

| Akhaa Ahli Aley | 1–1 | Safa |
|---|---|---|
| Ghanem 57' | Report | Hazime 90+4' |

Fouad Chehab Stadium, Jounieh
Referee: Mohamad Haddad

9 August 2022
16:00 UTC+3

| Tripoli | 0–1 | Safa |
|---|---|---|
| | Report | Hazime 90+3' |

Fouad Chehab Stadium, Jounieh
Referee: Ali Al Ashkar

== Final stage ==
Semi-finals; 15 August 2022
Safa | 2
Salam Zgharta | 0
Sagesse | 0
Akhaa Ahli Aley | 1

Final; 21 August 2022
Safa | 0
Akhaa Ahli Aley | 1

=== Semi-finals ===
14 August 2022
16:30 UTC+3

| Safa | 2–0 | Salam Zgharta |
|---|---|---|
| Damaj 45' | Report | Hazime 66' |

Tripoli Municipal Stadium, Tripoli
Referee: Ali Al Ashkar

15 August 2022
16:30 UTC+3

| Sagesse | 0–1 | Akhaa Ahli Aley |
|---|---|---|
| | Report | Saad 62' |

Tripoli Municipal Stadium, Tripoli
Referee: Maher Al Ali

=== Final ===
21 August 2022
16:30 UTC+3

| Safa | 0–1 | Akhaa Ahli Aley |
|---|---|---|
| | Report | Abboud 6' |

Tripoli Municipal Stadium, Tripoli
Referee: Ali Reda
