= Mohammad Al Massri =

Lebanese footballer (born 2001)

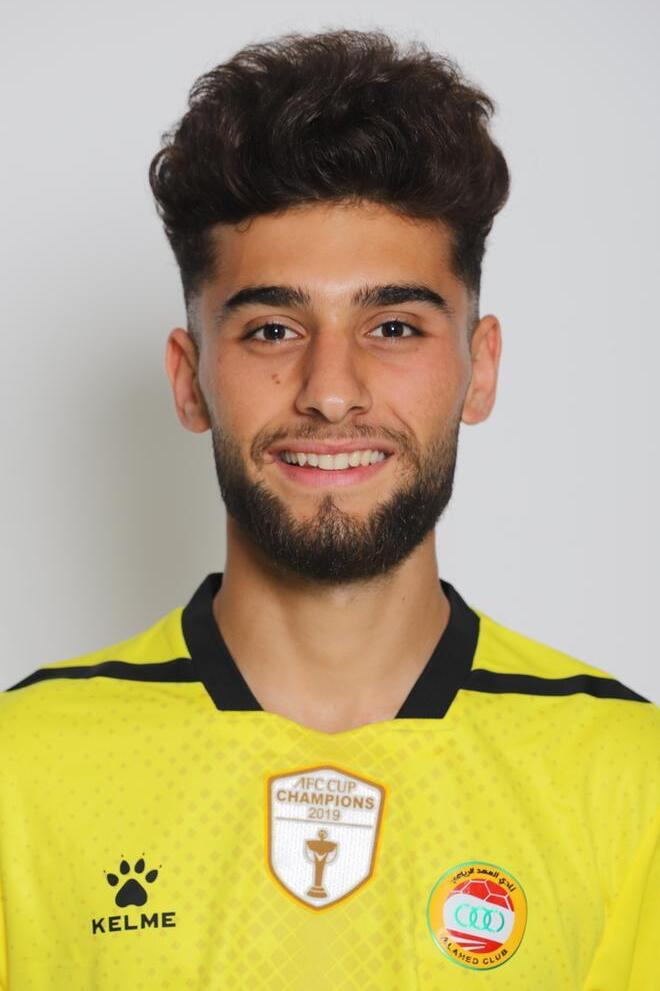
- Al Massri with Ahed in 2021

Personal information
- Full name: Mohammad Mahmoud Al Massri dit Al Yafawi
- Date of birth: 22 June 2001 (age 25)
- Place of birth: Beirut, Lebanon
- Positions: Forward; midfielder

Team information
- Current team: Ansar
- Number: 22

Youth career
- Ahed

Senior career*
Years	Team	Apps	(Gls)
2019–2023	Ahed	12	(1)
2021–2023	→ Akhaa Ahli Aley (loan)	34	(7)
2023–	Ansar	40	(3)
2026	→ Ahed (loan)	13	(0)

International career^{‡}
2019	Lebanon U19	3	(0)
2022–2023	Lebanon U23	8	(0)
2025	Lebanon	1	(0)
- * Club domestic league appearances and goals as of 10:24, 3 August 2026 (UTC) ‡ National team caps and goals as of 8 September 2025

Mohammad Mahmoud Al Massri dit Al Yafawi (Arabic: محمد محمود المصري المعروف بـ اليفاوي; born 22 June 2001) is a Lebanese footballer who plays as a forward or midfielder for Lebanese Premier League club Ansar.

== Club career ==
Coming through the youth system, Al Massri made his senior debut for Ahed on 21 April 2019, scoring in a 2–1 Lebanese Premier League win against Nejmeh.

Al Massri was sent on loan to Akhaa Ahli Aley for the 2021–22 season, and scored his first goal for the club in September 2021 against AC Sporting. The loan was further renewed for the 2022–23 season. He helped Akhaa win the 2022 Lebanese Challenge Cup. On 12 February 2023, Al Massri scored a hat-trick against Tripoli.

On 9 June 2023, Al Massri joined Ansar on a five-year contract from Ahed. In January 2026, Al Massri returned to Ahed on loan for the remainder of the 2025–26 season. He re-joined Ansar in August 2026, following his loan.

== International career ==
Al Massri is a former youth international for Lebanon, having played at the under-16, under-19, and under-23 levels.

He first featured for the Lebanon national team on 26 August 2025, for an unofficial (Note: The match was not considered an official international fixture, as it was played in two 35-minute halves (70 minutes in total).) friendly against Qatar. His official debut came on 8 September 2025, in a 0–0 friendly draw against Indonesia.

== Career statistics ==
=== Club ===
As of match played 3 October 2025

Appearances and goals by club, season and competition
Club	Season	League			Lebanon Cup		League cup (Note: Includes Lebanese Elite Cup, Lebanese Challenge Cup, Lebanese Federation Cup)		Continental		Other		Total	
Club	Season	Division	Apps	Goals	Apps	Goals	Apps	Goals	Apps	Goals	Apps	Goals	Apps	Goals
Ahed	2018–19	Lebanese Premier League	1	1	—		—		—		—		1	1
Ahed	2019–20	Lebanese Premier League	0	0	—		—		2 (Note: Appearances in AFC Cup)	0	—		2	0
Ahed	2020–21	Lebanese Premier League	11	0	0	0	—		0	0	—		11	0
Ahed	Total		12	1	0	0	0	0	2	0	0	0	14	1
Akhaa Ahli Aley (loan)	2021–22	Lebanese Premier League	18	3	0	0	2	0	—		—		20	3
Akhaa Ahli Aley (loan)	2022–23	Lebanese Premier League	16	4	1	0	4	1	—		—		21	5
Akhaa Ahli Aley (loan)	Total		34	7	1	0	6	1	0	0	0	0	41	8
Ansar	2023–24	Lebanese Premier League	16	2	4	0	—		—		—		20	2
Ansar	2024–25	Lebanese Premier League	19	1	—		—		—		1 (Note: Appearance in Lebanese Super Cup)	0	20	1
Ansar	2025–26	Lebanese Premier League	2	0	—		—		—		—		2	0
Ansar	Total		37	3	4	0	0	0	0	0	1	0	42	3
Career total			83	11	5	0	6	1	2	0	1	0	97	12

=== International ===
As of match played 28 May 2025

Appearances and goals by national team and year
National team	Year	Apps	Goals
Lebanon	2025	1	0
Total		1	0

== Honours ==
Ahed

- Lebanese Super Cup: 2019
- AFC Cup: 2019

Akhaa Ahli Aley

- Lebanese Challenge Cup: 2022

Ansar

- Lebanese Premier League: 2024–25
- Lebanese FA Cup: 2023–24
