= Abou Bakr Al-Mel =

Lebanese footballer (born 1992)

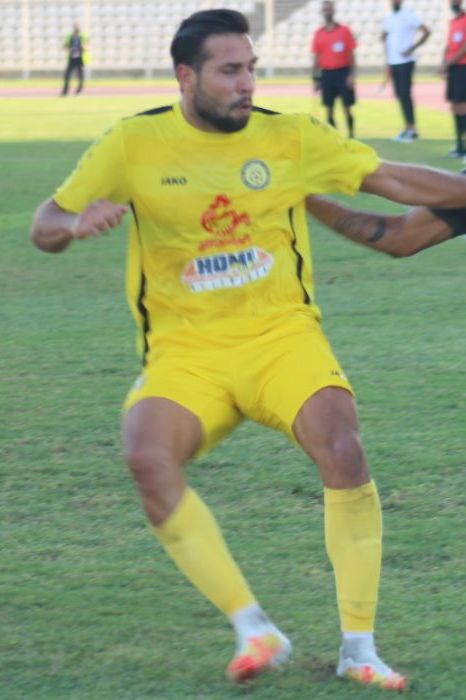
- Bako with Bourj in 2020

Personal information
- Full name: Abou Bakr Ali Al-Mel
- Date of birth: 15 November 1992 (age 33)
- Place of birth: Tripoli, Lebanon
- Height: 1.83 m (6 ft 0 in)
- Position: Forward

Team information
- Current team: Ijtimaii

Senior career*
Years	Team	Apps	(Gls)
2011–2012	Nejmeh	5	(0)
2012–2013	Ijtimaii	17	(1)
2013–2015	Salam Zgharta	35	(9)
2015–2017	Tripoli	37	(21)
2017	Kelantan	9	(1)
2018	Tripoli	11	(3)
2018	PSIS Semarang	3	(0)
2018–2019	Nejmeh	18	(4)
2019–2020	Tripoli	2	(0)
2020	Bourj	7	(2)
2020–2021	UiTM	9	(0)
2021–2024	Bourj	23	(3)
2022	→ Sagesse (loan)	10	(0)
2024–2025	Tripoli	9	(4)
2025–	Ijtimaii		(9)

International career
2016–2017	Lebanon	3	(0)
- * Club domestic league appearances and goals as of 21:54, 17 August 2026 (UTC)

Abou Bakr Ali Al-Mel (Arabic: أبو بكر علي المل; born 15 November 1992), also known as Bako (Arabic: باكو), is a Lebanese professional footballer who plays as a forward for Lebanese Second Division club Ijtimaii.

== Club career ==
=== Nejmeh ===
Al-Mel made his debut in Lebanese Premier League with Nejmeh in 2011 as an 18-year-old and made five appearances with his came on 30 December 2011 in the match where Safa against Nejmeh when he was substituted in to replace Hassan Al Mohamed on minute 85, and able to make 5 appearances as a substitute for the club and had 38 minutes of play.

=== Egtmaaey ===
Al-Mel signed for Al Egtmaaey Tripoli for the 2012–13 season. On 19 March 2013 he scored his first goal in his career and for Al-Shabab in a 5–3 win over Shabab Al-Ghazieh. He had 770 minutes played after had played 17 matches where he had 6 appearances as first eleven.

=== Salam Zgharta ===
==== 2013–14 season ====
Al-Mel joined Salam Zgharta for 2013–14 season and made his debut against his former club, Nejmeh where they lost 0–2. He scored his first goal for the club on 2 November 2013 against Racing Beirut. On 14 November 2013, he scored two goal against his former club, Al Egtmaaey Tripoli which is the first time he scored twice in a match in his career. He also started to make more appearances as the first eleven as he made 20 appearances where 19 of them is as the first eleven. He is also one of the Lebanese FA Cup winning squad on that year as Salam Zgharta won 1–0 after extra time on 31 May 2014.

==== 2014–15 season ====
He stayed at Salam Zgharta for 2014–15 season to make it his first club where he played for two seasons straight. His first season this season came on 23 November 2014 against Al-Nabi Shayth He make 15 appearances with 5 goals for this season. For winning the Lebanese FA Cup in the previous season, Salam Zgharta was given the chance to compete in AFC Cup which will be his and the club inaugural season competing in the cup. His debut in AFC Cup came on 17 February 2015 in 2015 AFC Cup qualifying play-off against Tajikistan club, Khayr Vahdat FK where they won 3–0 and qualified to the group stage. His first goal in the AFC Cup was during the match against Al-Nahda Club, an Oman based club where he scored twice to make a 2–1 win. Their journey in the 2015 AFC Cup came to an end after placed in 4th position with only 3 points after only 1 match won from 6 matches.

=== Tripoli ===
==== 2015–16 season ====
After making 35 appearances and 9 goals with Salam Zgharta, he signed with Tripoli SC and his debut came on 16 October 2015 against Al Ansar. He scored his first goal for the club on 1 November 2015 against Safa. As Tripoli SC was the Lebanese FA Cup champion for 2014–15 Lebanese FA Cup, he get another chance in the AFC Cup where he get to scored two goals also in this campaign but still failed to pass the group stage after Tripoli only placed 3rd in group

==== 2016–17 season ====
2016–17 was a great season for Al-Mel as he was named as Lebanese Premier League top scorer as he scored 16 goals.

=== Kelantan ===
On 18 May 2017, Al-Mel joined Liga Super side, Kelantan on a one-and-a-half-year contract that will end in November 2018. He was signed to replace his fellow countryman, Mohammed Ghaddar. This was also the first time in his career for him to expatriate from Lebanon to play at foreign country. It was also revealed he had rejected a trial offer from West Ham United and an offer from Saudi Arabia based club to joined Kelantan. He made his debut on 24 May 2017, playing against Penang.

=== PSIS Semarang ===
Al-Mel signed for Indonesian side PSIS Semarang in the 2018 Liga 1. He made his first team debut on 30 July 2018 in a 1–1 2018 Liga 1 home draw against PSM Makassar, replacing Bayu Nugroho after 56 minutes and assisting Hari Nur Yulianto's goal.

=== Return to Nejmeh ===
On 10 September 2018, Al-Mel returned to Lebanon, signing for Nejmeh. In his debut game in the league, 21 September 2018, he scored a goal against Ansar in a 4–2 domestic win. On 29 January he scored a brace in the Lebanese FA Cup Round of 16 game against Takadom Ankoun in a 6–0 win.

Al-Mel was chosen as the best player of the season by a public referendum held by Football Lebanon.

=== Bourj ===
On 8 September 2020, Al-Mel joined Bourj on a permanent deal. He played seven games, scoring two goals and making one assist in the first half of the 2020–21 Lebanese Premier League.

=== UiTM ===
In December 2020 Al-Mel moved back to Malaysia, joining UiTM ahead of the 2021 Malaysia Super League. He made his debut on 6 March 2021, losing 2–1 in the first matchday against Terengganu.

=== Return to Bourj ===
On 22 May 2021, Al-Mel returned to Bourj. He helped his side win the 2021 Lebanese Challenge Cup as the competition's top goalscorer, with three goals.

=== Sagesse ===
On 4 July 2022, Al-Mel moved to Sagesse, alongside Bourj teammate Akram Moghrabi.

=== Second return to Bourj ===
On 29 May 2023, Al-Mel returned once again to Bourj.

== International career ==
Al-Mel first appearance for Lebanon came on 5 February 2016, as a substitute in a friendly against Bahrain.

== Career statistics ==
=== Club ===
As of 29 January 2019

Appearances and goals by club, season and competition
Club	Season	League			National Cup		League Cup		Continental		Total	
Club	Season	Division	Apps	Goals	Apps	Goals	Apps	Goals	Apps	Goals	Apps	Goals
Nejmeh	2011–12	Lebanese Premier League	5	0	—		—		—		5	0
Egtmaaey Tripoli	2012–13	Lebanese Premier League	17	1	—		—		—		17	1
Salam Zgharta	2013–14	Lebanese Premier League	20	4	—		—		—		20	4
Salam Zgharta	2014–15	Lebanese Premier League	15	5	—		—		2	2	17	7
Salam Zgharta	Total		35	9	—		—		2	2	37	11
Tripoli	2015–16	Lebanese Premier League	17	5	—		—		2	2	19	7
Tripoli	2016–17	Lebanese Premier League	20	16	—		—		—		20	16
Tripoli	Total		37	21	—		—		2	2	39	23
Kelantan	2017	Liga Super	9	1	—		5	3	—		14	4
Tripoli	2017–18	Lebanese Premier League	11	3	—		—		—		11	3
PSIS Semarang	2018	Liga 1	3	0	—		0	0	—		3	0
Nejmeh	2018–19	Lebanese Premier League	9	4	1	2	—		—		10	6
Career total			126	39	1	2	5	3	4	4	136	48

== Honours ==
Salam Zgharta

- Lebanese FA Cup: 2013–14

Bourj

- Lebanese Challenge Cup: 2021

Individual

- Lebanese Premier League Team of the Season: 2016–17
- Lebanese Premier League Best Goal: 2013–14
- Lebanese Premier League top scorer: 2016-17
- Lebanese Challenge Cup top scorer: 2021 (Note: Tied with Mohamad Korhani)
