= Sullo =

Sullo is an Italian surname. Notable people with the surname include:

- Fiorentino Sullo (1921–2000), Italian politician
- Salvatore Sullo (born 1971), Italian footballer
