= Ahmad Moghrabi =

Lebanese footballer and coach (born 1983)

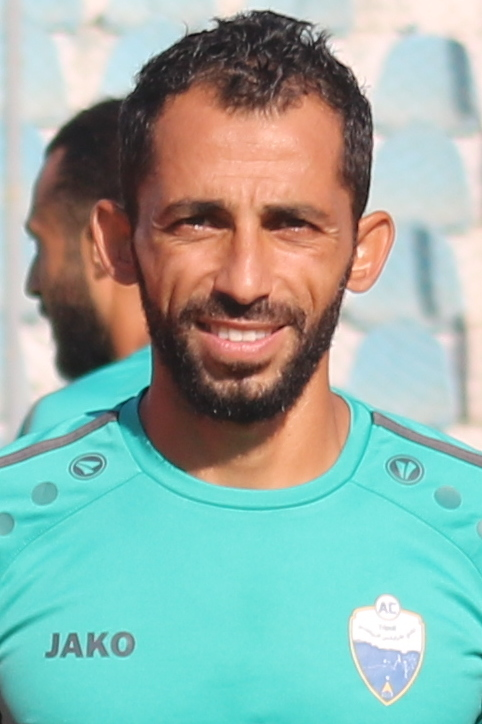
- Moghrabi with Tripoli in 2021

Personal information
- Full name: Ahmad Omar Moghrabi
- Date of birth: 2 December 1983 (age 42)
- Place of birth: Tripoli, Lebanon
- Height: 1.73 m (5 ft 8 in)
- Position: Midfielder

Youth career
- 1999–2003: Nejmeh

Senior career*
Years	Team	Apps	(Gls)
2003–2013	Nejmeh		
2013–2018	Tripoli	102	(4)
2018	Sohar		
2018–2022	Tripoli	48	(5)

International career
2015–2016	Lebanon	9	(0)

Managerial career
- 2022: Ijtimaii
- * Club domestic league appearances and goals

Ahmad Omar Moghrabi (Arabic: أحمد عمر مغربي; born 2 December 1983) is a Lebanese football coach and former player.

Coming through the youth system, Moghrabi began his senior career with Nejmeh in 2003 as a midfielder, and moved to Tripoli in 2013, with whom he retired. He also had a short stint with Omani club Sohar in 2018.

== Club career ==
Moghrabi began his youth career with Nejmeh on 1 September 1999.

On 3 October 2018, Moghrabi moved to Oman Professional League side Sohar. He terminated his contract with the club on 3 December, citing family reasons. He returned to Tripoli in the Lebanese Premier League, and announced his retirement in August 2022.

== Personal life ==
Ahmad's brother, Akram, is also a footballer.

== Honours ==
Nejmeh

- Lebanese Premier League: 2003–04, 2004–05, 2008–09
- Lebanese Elite Cup: 2003, 2004, 2005
- Lebanese Super Cup: 2004, 2009
- AFC Cup runner-up: 2005
- Lebanese FA Cup runner-up: 2003–04, 2011–12

Tripoli

- Lebanese FA Cup: 2014–15; runner-up: 2013–14
- Lebanese Challenge Cup runner-up: 2021

== See also ==
- List of association football families
