= Paul Rustom =

Lebanese footballer and coach (born 1983)

Personal information
- Full name: Paul Emile Rustom
- Date of birth: 26 January 1983 (age 43)
- Place of birth: Beirut, Lebanon
- Height: 1.84 m (6 ft 0 in)
- Position: Forward

Team information
- Current team: Sagesse (head coach)

Senior career*
Years	Team	Apps	(Gls)
2000–2007	Sagesse		(43)
2007–2008	Ansar		(3)
2008–2010	Nejmeh		(6)
2010–2011	Akhaa Ahli Aley		(2)
2011–2012	Sagesse		
2012–2016	Racing Beirut	51	(8)
2021–2022	Sagesse	7	(1)
Total			(63)

International career
2003	Lebanon U23		
2006–2009	Lebanon	16	(1)

Managerial career
- 2020–2022: Lebanon U20 (assistant)
- 2022–2023: Sagesse (assistant)
- 2023–: Sagesse
- * Club domestic league appearances and goals

Paul Emile Rustom (Arabic: بول إميل رستم; born 26 January 1983) is a Lebanese football coach and former player who is head coach of Lebanese Premier League club Sagesse. He is the son of Emile Rustom, a football manager and former player.

== Club career ==
Rustom began his career at Sagesse, before moving to Ansar on 23 August 2007. After finishing runner-up in the Lebanese Premier League and the Lebanese Elite Cup, he signed for Nejmeh in September 2008. He won the 2008–09 Lebanese Premier League, and the 2009 Lebanese Super Cup after beating Ahed in the final.

In 2010 he signed with Akhaa Ahli Aley, before returning to Sagesse in the Lebanese Second Division the following year. He signed for Racing Beirut in September 2012, scoring his first goal on 27 October in a 4–2 defeat to Ansar. On 1 June 2013, he scored a brace to secure the win against Tadamon Sour in the final game of the season, helping Racing Beirut reach third place in the league table for the first time in 40 years.

Rustom returned from retirement in March 2021, signing for Sagesse in the Second Division ahead of the second leg.

== International career ==
Rustom began his international career in 2003, playing in the qualifiers for the 2004 Summer Olympics.

== Managerial career ==
On 12 August 2020, Rustom was appointed assistant coach of the Lebanon national under-20 team. In 2023, after a season as assistant coach, Rustom was appointed head coach of Sagesse.

== Personal life ==
Rustom is the son of the Lebanese football manager and former player Emile Rustom. He also has two siblings: Elie and Lawrence.

== See also ==
- List of association football families
