= Atwi =

Atwi (Arabic: عطوي) is a Lebanese surname. Notable people with the surname include:

- Abbas Ahmed Atwi (born 1979), Lebanese footballer
- Abbas Ali Atwi (born 1984), Lebanese footballer
- Mohamed Atwi (1987–2020), Lebanese footballer
