= Emile Rustom =

Lebanese footballer and coach (born 1952)

Personal information
- Full name: Emile Boulos Rustom
- Date of birth: 27 March 1952 (age 74)
- Place of birth: Achrafieh, Beirut, Lebanon
- Height: 1.80 m (5 ft 11 in)
- Positions: Defender; midfielder

Team information
- Current team: Sagesse (advisor)

Senior career*
Years	Team	Apps	(Gls)
1966–1988	Sagesse		

International career
1970s–1980s	Lebanon	2+	(0+)

Managerial career
- 2005: Sagesse
- 2008–2010: Nejmeh
- 2008–2011: Lebanon
- 2011: Lebanon
- 2013–2014: Shabab Sahel
- 2015–2016: Safa
- 2017: Ansar
- 2020: Safa
- 2022–2023: Sagesse
- * Club domestic league appearances and goals

Emile Boulos Rustom (Arabic: إميل بولس رستم; born 27 March 1952) is a Lebanese football coach and former player who an advisor for Lebanese Premier League club Sagesse.

After playing with Sagesse for 22 years, and the Lebanon national team for nine, he became Sagesse's coach in 2005. He then coached Nejmeh, Shabab Sahel, Safa, and Ansar. He is the first coach to win the Lebanese Premier League with two different teams (Nejmeh and Safa), as well as the first coach to coach both cross-city rivals Nejmeh and Ansar. Rustom also coached Lebanon, from 2008 to 2011.

Rustom is the father of Paul, a former Lebanese Premier League and Lebanon national team player.

== Club career ==
Rustom made his league debut for Sagesse on 23 December 1966, against Antranik at the Habib Abou Chahla Stadium. He played for Sagesse for 22 years, before retiring in 1988.

== International career ==
Rustom played the Lebanon national team for nine years, representing them at the 1980 AFC Asian Cup qualifiers in 1979.

== Managerial career ==
He began coaching in 2005, becoming the manager of his former club Sagesse. In 2008, Rustom became the manager of both Nejmeh, with whom he remained until 2010, and the Lebanon national team. With Nejmeh, Rustom won the 2008–09 Lebanese Premier League, and the 2009 Lebanese Super Cup. He coached Lebanon until 2011, before being re-appointed coach of Lebanon once again, on 5 May 2011. However, after less than three months, on 3 August Rustom resigned.

After coaching Shabab Sahel during the 2013–14 season, in 2015 Rustom became manager of Safa. He won the 2015–16 league title with them, becoming the first coach to win the Lebanese Premier League with two different teams. In 2017 Rustom coached Ansar; he became the first coach to manage both Nejmeh and Ansar, who contest the Beirut derby. However, after losing both the Lebanese Elite Cup and Lebanese Super Cup prior to the 2017–18 league season, Rustom resigned.

On 20 July 2020, Rustom was re-appointed head coach of Safa ahead of the 2020–21 season. He resigned on 2 November 2020. On 25 June 2022, Rustom was re-appointed head coach of Sagesse in the Lebanese Premier League.

== Personal life ==
Rustom is married to Salwa Abou Sleiman, and has three children: Paul, Laurence, and Elie. Paul played in the Lebanese Premier League and for the Lebanon national team.

Rustom holds a master's degree in French language and literature, in addition to training certificates from the French Federation (1981) and the Brazilian Academy (1984). In 2005 Rustom was the vice-president of Sagesse, as well as the chairman of their technical committee.

== Honours ==
=== Manager ===
Nejmeh

- Lebanese Premier League: 2008–09
- Lebanese Super Cup: 2009

Safa

- Lebanese Premier League: 2015–16

Individual

- Lebanese Premier League Best Coach: 2008–09, 2015–16

== See also ==
- List of association football families
