= 2021 Lebanese Challenge Cup =

2021 edition of the Lebanese Challenge Cup

Tournament details
- Country: Lebanon
- Dates: 13 July – 1 August
- Teams: 6

Final positions
- Champions: Bourj
- Runners-up: Tripoli

Tournament statistics
- Matches played: 9
- Goals scored: 24 (2.67 per match)
- Top goal scorer(s): Abou Bakr Al-Mel; Mohamad Korhani (3 goals each)

The 2021 Lebanese Challenge Cup was the 8th edition of the Lebanese Challenge Cup. The competition included the teams placed between 7th and 10th in the 2020–21 Lebanese Premier League, and the two newly promoted teams from the 2020–21 Lebanese Second Division. The first matchday was played on 13 July, one day to the start of the 2021 Lebanese Elite Cup. Bourj, the defending champions, won their second title after beating Tripoli in the final.

== Group stage ==
=== Group A ===
Pos	Team	Pld	W	D	L	GF	GA	GD	Pts	Qualification
1	Bourj	2	2	0	0	3	0	+3	6	Advance to semi-finals
2	Tripoli	2	0	1	1	1	2	−1	1	Advance to semi-finals
3	Shabab Bourj	2	0	1	1	1	3	−2	1	

Source: Global Sports Archive
13 July 2021
17:30 UTC+3

Tripoli	0–1	Bourj
	Report	Moghrabi 45'

Fouad Chehab Stadium, Jounieh

17 July 2021
17:30 UTC+3

Tripoli	1–1	Shabab Bourj
Korhani 85'	Report	El Kadi 6'

Fouad Chehab Stadium, Jounieh

21 July 2021
17:30 UTC+3

Bourj	2–0	Shabab Bourj
Atriss 43'; Damej 70'	Report

Fouad Chehab Stadium, Jounieh

=== Group B ===
Pos	Team	Pld	W	D	L	GF	GA	GD	Pts	Qualification
1	Sagesse	2	1	1	0	3	2	+1	4	Advance to semi-finals
2	AC Sporting	2	1	0	1	2	1	+1	3	Advance to semi-finals
3	Tadamon Sour	2	0	0	2	2	4	−2	0	

Source: Global Sports Archive
13 July 2021
17:30 UTC+3

Tadamon Sour	0–2	AC Sporting
	Report	Khalife 26'; Hammoud 56'

Kfarjoz Municipal Stadium, Kfar Jouz, Nabatieh

17 July 2021
17:30 UTC+3

Tadamon Sour	2–2	Sagesse
Sarriyeh 10', 19'	Report	Atwi 25'; Badran 85'

Kfarjoz Municipal Stadium, Kfar Jouz, Nabatieh

21 July 2021
17:30 UTC+3

AC Sporting	0–1	Sagesse
	Report	Younes 14'

Amin Abdelnour Stadium, Bhamdoun

== Final stage ==
Semi-finals; 25 July 2021
Sagesse	1
Tripoli	2
Bourj	2
AC Sporting	1

Final; 1 August 2021
Tripoli	2
Bourj	4

=== Semi-finals ===
25 July 2021
17:00 UTC+3

Sagesse	1–2	Tripoli
Termos 11'	Report	Eid 12', 27'

Fouad Chehab Stadium, Jounieh

25 July 2021
17:00 UTC+3

Bourj	2–1	AC Sporting
Al-Mel 60'; Atriss 85'	Report	Fardous 57'

Amin Abdelnour Stadium, Bhamdoun

=== Final ===
1 August 2021
17:00 UTC+3

Tripoli	4–2	Bourj
El Outa 6', 75'; Al-Mel 71', 83'	Report	Korhani 80', 88'

Fouad Chehab Stadium, Jounieh

== Top scorers ==
Rank	Player	Club	Goals
1	(Lebanon) Abou Bakr Al-Mel	Bourj	3
1	(Lebanon) Mohamad Korhani	Tripoli	3
1	(Lebanon) Fouad Eid	Tripoli	2
1	(Palestine) Ghassan Sarriyeh	Tadamon Sour	2
1	(Lebanon) Hussein El Outa	Bourj	2
1	(Lebanon) Youssef Atriss	Bourj	2
