= Alaa Baidoun =

Syrian footballer (born 1983)

Personal information
- Full name: Alaa Baidoun
- Date of birth: 5 March 1983 (age 43)
- Place of birth: Aleppo, Syria
- Positions: Defender; midfielder

Team information
- Current team: Al-Muhafaza

Youth career
- Hurriya SC

Senior career*
Years	Team	Apps	(Gls)
- Jableh SC
2009–2010	Al-Saqr		
2010–2011	Omayya		
2011–2013	Al-Akhaa Al-Ahli	33	(4)
2013–2014	Al-Mabarrah	11	(5)
2014–	Al-Muhafaza		
- * Club domestic league appearances and goals

Alaa Baidoun (Arabic: علاء بيضون; born 5 March 1983 in Aleppo, Syria) is a Syrian footballer who plays for Al-Muhafaza, which competes in the Syrian Premier League the top division in Syria. He plays as a midfielder. Baidoun scored the winning goal in a friendly match against Tuvalu in 2009.
