= Ray Jones (footballer, born 1988) =

English footballer (1988-2007)

- Jones playing for Queens Park Rangers

Personal information
- Full name: Raymond Barry Bankote Jones
- Date of birth: 28 August 1988
- Place of birth: East Ham, London, England
- Date of death: 25 August 2007 (aged 18)
- Place of death: East Ham, London, England
- Position: Striker

Youth career
- –2006: Queens Park Rangers

Senior career*
Years	Team	Apps	(Gls)
2006–2007	Queens Park Rangers	33	(5)
Total		33	(5)

International career
2006	England U19	1	(0)
- * Club domestic league appearances and goals

Raymond Barry Bankote Jones (28 August 1988 – 25 August 2007) was an English professional footballer who played as a striker. Jones spent his professional career at Queens Park Rangers, making his debut in the Football League Championship in April 2006. His good form at the start of the following season led to his only international match, for England under-19 against the Netherlands, as well as bids for other clubs to sign him. He totalled six goals in 37 professional matches.

Jones died at age 18, when he drove head-on into a bus in London. His club retired his shirt number of 31. An inquest into the accident ruled that had Jones survived, he would have faced charges of causing death by dangerous driving for the deaths of his two passengers.

== Career ==
Born in East Ham, London, Jones was rejected as a youth team player at Colchester United before impressing the coaches at Queens Park Rangers (QPR). He made his professional debut on 22 April 2006, coming on for the final seven minutes as a substitute for Steve Lomas in a 1–2 home loss to promotion-chasing Watford. Eight days later, he made his second appearance of the season, coming on for Stefan Bailey in the 68th minute of a defeat by the same score away to the already-crowned winners of the Football League Championship, Reading.

Jones had his first professional start on 12 August 2006, in a 2–0 win over Southend United at Loftus Road. He assisted Nick Ward's goal in the 41st minute, which gave QPR their first win of the new season. Brian Glanville of The Sunday Times opined that Jones and fellow youngster Dexter Blackstock combined in the forward line "as though they had been playing together for years". Ten days later in the second round of the Football League Cup at home to Northampton Town, Jones came on for Marc Bircham in the 84th minute, and three minutes later headed Marcus Bignot's cross for his first career goal, winning the match 3–2.

On 5 September, Jones made his only international appearance, replacing Giles Barnes in a goalless friendly draw for England under-19 against the Netherlands at the Bescot Stadium in Walsall. Eighteen days later, he scored his first league goal, opening a 2–0 home win over Hull City, the first match of John Gregory's tenure. Jones followed this the following weekend as QPR came from behind to win 2–1 at Southampton, scoring the decisive goal after rounding goalkeeper Kelvin Davis. On 17 November, as a substitute for Blackstock, Jones scored the only goal in a 1–0 away win over high-flying Cardiff City, connecting with Ward's cross with less than three minutes left of the match.

Many Premier League clubs showed interest in Jones after several solid performances, and Gregory at one point stated that he was resigned to him leaving. After scoring the only goal against Colchester on 1 January 2007, he pledged his future to the club, and a week later as he signed a new three-and-a-half-year deal. In total, Jones played 37 games (19 as a substitute) for QPR in all competitions, scoring six goals.

Colchester made a £200,000 offer for Jones in June 2007, which was rejected, but they made another bid the following day, which was also turned down. QPR's West London derby rivals Fulham also bid for him, as did Derby County, who offered £5.75 million for him and teammate Lee Cook. He missed the start of the 2007–08 season, in the last month of his life, due to a foot injury.

=== Style of play ===
Writing Jones's obituary in The Guardian, QPR fan Benjie Goodhart remembered him as the club's "own Wayne Rooney, the prodigy, all precocious talent and burgeoning potential", and attributed him the essential qualities for a forward including strength, speed, intelligence and confidence. He was perceived by the supporters to be the epitome of a new era under manager Gregory and prospective new owner Flavio Briatore, and could do "things for real that his peers acted out on their games consoles". Goodhart also praised Jones for taking the London Underground back home from games alongside the supporters.

== Death ==
Jones died in a car crash in East Ham in the early hours of 25 August 2007 when the vehicle he was driving collided with a bus. He had only become a licensed driver 23 days earlier. Two passengers in his car, Idris Olasupo and Jess Basilva, were also killed; Olasupo received a letter later that day, inviting him to Fulham's academy. Jones's death was compared to that of Kiyan Prince, a QPR youth player who was fatally stabbed the previous year at the age of 15 when breaking up a fight. Goodhart wrote that tributes would be "done particularly beautifully at QPR because, heartbreakingly, we're getting rather good at it".

As a mark of respect QPR postponed their upcoming game with Burnley, a team who in turn replaced it with an open training session with proceeds going to the charity of QPR's choice. QPR also decided to retire the number 31 shirt in memory of Jones, who wore that shirt during his career. In their league game against Southampton on 1 September 2007, all of the QPR players carried Jones's name on the back of their shirts as a mark of respect. Ten days later, in the England U19 friendly against Belarus at Meadow Lane in Nottingham, a minute's applause was held before the match.

An inquest in April 2008 found that Jones had sped over a pedestrian crossing on the wrong side of the road, leading to a head-on collision. His death was recorded as an accident, but it was confirmed that had he survived, he would have been facing two charges of causing death by dangerous driving.

== Career statistics ==
Appearances and goals by club, season and competition
Club	Season	League			FA Cup		League Cup		Total	
Club	Season	Division	Apps	Goals	Apps	Goals	Apps	Goals	Apps	Goals
Queens Park Rangers	2005–06	Championship	2	0	0	0	0	0	2	0
Queens Park Rangers	2006–07	Championship	31	5	2	0	2	1	35	6
Career total			33	5	2	0	2	1	37	6
