= 2013–14 Lebanese Premier League =

Lebanese Premier League
- Season: 2013–14
- Top goalscorer: (Lebanon) Adnan Milhem (10 goals)

The 2013–14 Lebanese Premier League is the 53rd season of top-tier football in Lebanon. A total of twelve teams are competing in the league, with Safa the defending champions. The season kicked off on 21 September 2013 and will finish around June 2014.

== Teams ==
Shabab Al-Ghazieh and Salam Sour were relegated to the second level of Lebanese football after ending the 2012–13 season in the bottom two places. They were replaced by Al-Mabarrah, back after one campaign away after relegation in the 2011–12 league campaign. Salam Zgharta were also promoted and back for the first time since relegation in 2008–09.

=== Stadia and locations ===
Locations of teams in the 2013–14 Lebanese Premier League

Club	Location	Stadium	Stadium capacity
Al Ahed	Beirut	Beirut Municipal Stadium	22,500
Al Akhaa Al Ahli	Aley	Amin Abdelnour Stadium	3,500
Al Ansar	Beirut	Beirut Municipal Stadium	22,500
Al Egtmaaey Tripoli	Tripoli	Tripoli Municipal Stadium	22,000
Al Mabarrah	Beirut	Municipal Stadium	
Al Nejmeh	Beirut	Rafic El-Hariri Stadium	15,000
Racing Beirut	Beirut	Fouad Shehab Stadium	5,000
Safa	Beirut	Safa Stadium	4,000
Salam Zgharta	Zgharta	Zgharta Stadium	
Shabab Al-Sahel	Beirut	Beirut Municipal Stadium	22,500
Tadamon Sour	Tyre	Sour Stadium	6,500
Tripoli SC	Tripoli	Tripoli Municipal Stadium	22,000

== Foreign players ==
Club	Visa 1	Visa 2	Visa 3	Visa 4	Non-Visa Foreign^{1}	Former Players^{2}
Al Ahed	(Guinea) Boubacar Diallo	(Brazil) Marcelo Dias	(Brazil) Rodolfo Soares	(Czech Republic) David Střihavka	(Palestine) Mohamad Abu Ateeq	None
Al-Akhaa Al-Ahli	(Morocco) Tarek Omrati	(Brazil) Diego Santos	(Brazil) Joziel	None	(Chile) Alexis Khazzaka	None
Al-Ansar	(Brazil) Tião	(Syria) Fahd Aodi	(Brazil) Rodrigo López	(Nigeria) Prince Abedi	None	None
Al Egtmaaey Tripoli	(Ghana) Afrane Yeboah	(Ghana) Frank Boateng	None	None	(Palestine) Mohammad Ghannam	None
Al-Mabarrah	(Syria) Alaa Baidoun	(Syria) Mohammed Mansour	(Palestine) Mohammad Hamad	None	None	None
Al Nejmeh	(Syria) Abd Al Naser Hasan	(Egypt) Ahmed Abdelaziz	(Senegal) Cheikha Sy	None	None	None
Racing Beirut	(Nigeria) Admil Precious	(Nigeria) Mba Derick Ebi	(Ivory Coast) Lassana Zorro	(Palestine) Haitham Khadoj	(Armenia) Agop Donabidian	None
Safa	(Ivory Coast) Ibrahim Touré	(Syria) Tamer Haj Mohamad	(Romania) Georgian Tobă	None	None	None
Salam Zgharta	(Palestine) Khaled Naamani	(Syria) Ahmad Haj Mohamad	(Senegal) Saleem Cissé	None	None	None
Shabab Al-Sahel	(Palestine) Wasim Abdelhady	(Syria) Ali Ghalioum	(Nigeria) Daniel Odafin	(Jordan) Ali Asaad	None	None
Tadamon Sour	(Ivory Coast) Zadi Serg Didier	(Ivory Coast) Dogi Jean	(Ivory Coast) Kone Ladgi Tiezan	(Ivory Coast) Konan Rishmond	None	None
Tripoli SC	(Syria) Jehad Al Baour	(Syria) Ammar Zakour	(Syria) Abdulrahman Akkari	(Palestine) Ibrahim Swidan	None	None

- ^1 Those players who were born and started their professional career abroad but have since gained Lebanon Residency.
- ^2 Foreign players who left their clubs after first half of the season.

== League table ==
Pos	Team	Pld	W	D	L	GF	GA	GD	Pts	Qualification or relegation
1	Al Nejmeh	22	12	8	2	48	24	+24	44	2015 AFC Cup Group stage
2	Safa	22	10	9	3	42	23	+19	39	
3	Racing Beirut	22	11	5	6	38	31	+7	38	
4	Al Ahed	22	10	7	5	30	26	+4	37	
5	Al-Akhaa Al-Ahli Aley	22	7	10	5	36	26	+10	31	
6	Tripoli SC	22	8	7	7	23	26	−3	31	
7	Shabab Al-Sahel	22	6	12	4	40	26	+14	30	
8	Al Ansar	22	7	9	6	27	23	+4	30	
9	Al-Tadamon Tyre	22	5	7	10	22	31	−9	22	
10	Salam Zgharta	22	6	4	12	27	46	−19	22	
11	Al-Mabarrah	22	5	3	14	21	50	−29	18	
12	Al-Egtmaaey Tripoli	22	2	4	16	26	48	−22	10	

Updated to match(es) played on unknown. Source: soccerway
Rules for classification: 1) points; 2) goal difference; 3) number of goals scored.
