= Luciano van den Berg =

Dutch footballer (1984–2005)

Personal information
- Full name: Luciano Thomas van den Berg
- Date of birth: 22 June 1984
- Place of birth: Amsterdam, Netherlands
- Date of death: 18 September 2005 (aged 21)
- Place of death: Almere, Netherlands
- Position: Defender

Youth career
- Abcoude
- Omnniworld

Senior career*
Years	Team	Apps	(Gls)
2005	Stormvogels Telstar	1	(0)
- * Club domestic league appearances and goals

Luciano Thomas van den Berg (22 June 1984 – 18 September 2005) was a Dutch professional footballer who played as a defender. He spent his short career with Stormvogels Telstar in the Eerste Divisie.

== Career ==
Van den Berg played youth football for Abcoude and Omnniworld before joining Stormvogels Telstar. He made his professional debut for the club during the promotion playoffs of the 2004–05 season, coming on as a substitute against VVV-Venlo and scoring the winning goal. His first appearance in a regular league match came the following season, on 16 September 2005, in a match against FC Zwolle. It would be his final appearance.

== Death ==
In the early hours of 18 September 2005, two days after his league debut, Van den Berg lost control of his car on the A6 motorway near his parental home in Almere Stad. He collided with a stationary vehicle and was killed instantly. A close friend of Dutch international Nigel de Jong, Van den Berg was 21 years old at the time of his death.

His funeral took place on 23 September 2005, the same day Telstar were scheduled to play De Graafschap. The match was postponed to the following Monday to allow for the ceremony, during which De Jong delivered a eulogy. Prior to kickoff in the rescheduled match, a minute of silence was held, followed by a tribute from De Graafschap's supporters group, the Spinnekop.

Van den Berg made two official appearances at professional level. In his memory, Telstar retired his shirt number 22.

== Career statistics ==
Appearances and goals by club, season and competition
Club	Season	League			KNVB Cup		Other		Total	
Club	Season	Division	Apps	Goals	Apps	Goals	Apps	Goals	Apps	Goals
Stormvogels Telstar	2004–05	Eerste Divisie	0	0	0	0	1 (Note: Appearance in Eredivisie promotion/relegation playoffs)	1	1	1
Stormvogels Telstar	2005–06	Eerste Divisie	1	0	0	0	—		1	0
Career total			1	0	0	0	1	1	2	1
