= Salvatore Sullo =

Italian footballer

Personal information
- Date of birth: 23 October 1971 (age 55)
- Place of birth: Naples, Italy
- Height: 1.82 m (6 ft 0 in)
- Position: Midfielder

Senior career*
Years	Team	Apps	(Gls)
1991	Puteolana	21	(1)
1991–1992	Avellino	0	(0)
1992	→ Turris (loan)	19	(0)
1992–1993	Avellino	0	(0)
1993–1995	Turris	54	(7)
1995–1997	Pescara	64	(7)
1997–1999	Reggiana	50	(7)
1999–2001	Pescara	66	(8)
2001–2007	Messina	138	(26)
2007	Avellino	7	(0)
2007–2008	Martina	17	(0)
2008–2009	Turris	23	(2)

Managerial career
- 2019–2020: Padova
- 2021: ACR Messina
- * Club domestic league appearances and goals

Salvatore "Sasà" Sullo (born 23 October 1971) is an Italian football coach and a former midfielder.

He was mainly known for having been the captain of Messina from 2001 to 2007 as part of the squad that gained two promotions, which led the team from Serie C1 to Serie A.

== Playing career ==
In 2005, Sullo was forced to temporarily quit football because of a B-cell lymphoma, but fully recovered and returned playing within eight months' time.

Sullo left Messina in January 2007 to join Avellino of Serie C1, with his number 41 shirt being retired in commemoration of his services for the club. He was also awarded an honorary Messina citizenship by the local government. After having won promotion playoffs with Avellino in 2007, he joined Martina, another Serie C1 team, during the summer market.

== Coaching career ==
After retirement, he joined Gian Piero Ventura's staff as his assistant at Bari in 2009. He then followed Ventura as his assistant also at Torino from 2011 to 2016, the Italy national team in 2016 and 2017, and also on his short stint at Chievo in 2018.

On 19 June 2019 he took on his first head coaching role, being appointed at the helm of Padova for the club's 2019–20 Serie C campaign. On 20 January 2020 he was dismissed by the club following 3 consecutive losses.

After a year without a job, Sullo returned into management as the new head coach of newly promoted Serie C club ACR Messina for the 2021–22 season. He was sacked on 11 October 2021 due to poor results.

== See also ==
- Retired numbers in association football
