= Meni Levi =

Israeli footballer

Meni Levi מני לוי
Personal information
- Full name: Meni Levi
- Date of birth: 6 August 1980 (age 46)
- Place of birth: Israel
- Position: Right-back

Youth career
- –2000: Maccabi Tel Aviv

Senior career*
Years	Team	Apps	(Gls)
2000–2002	Maccabi Tel Aviv	42	(2)
Total		42	(2)

International career
2001–2002	Israel U21	2	(0)
- * Club domestic league appearances and goals

Meni Levi (Hebrew: מני לוי; born 6 August 1980), is a retired Israeli footballer who played as a right back for Israeli football club Maccabi Tel Aviv.

Levi started playing for Maccabi Tel Aviv from a young age, making his debut for the club as a substitute on 1 January 2000 against Hapoel Haifa. He was considered to be a big prospect in 2001/2002 Israeli football and was named the discovery of the year. Levi scored his first goal in the Israeli Premier League on 12 October 2001, in the 90th minute of a match against Hapoel Petah Tikva in Bloomfield Stadium.

On 26 January 2002 during an Israeli Premier League match against Beitar Jerusalem at Teddy Stadium, Levi suddenly collapsed in the middle of the pitch, away from the run of play. A few moments later, he rose to his feet then collapsed again. He was treated at length on the pitch. Eventually the match was cancelled and Levi was taken to a hospital.

Levi was treated for years in the rehabilitation facility Beit Levinstein, and later returned to his family house in a vegetative state. He is visited by Maccabi Tel Aviv fans, players and management several times a year. Levi sometimes interacts with them with smiles, blinks and sheds tears.

Maccabi Tel Aviv retired the jersey number 12, Levi's number, as a tribute to him.
