= Souaisset =

Town in Akkar District, Lebanon

Souaisset السويسة
- town
- Location within Lebanon
- Coordinates: 34°33′22″N 36°07′25″E
- Country: Lebanon
- Governorate: Akkar
- District: Akkar

Area
  - Total: 1.22 km^{2} (0.47 sq mi)
- Elevation: 1,500 m (4,900 ft)

Population (2009)
  - Total: 1,158 eligible voters
  - Density: 949/km^{2} (2,460/sq mi)
- Time zone: UTC+2 (EET)
  - Summer (DST): UTC+3 (EEST)
- Dialing code: +961

Souaisset (Arabic: السويسة) is a town in Akkar Governorate, Lebanon.

The population is mostly Sunni Muslim.

== History ==
In 1838, Eli Smith noted the place as es-Suweisy, located east of esh-Sheikh Mohammed. The inhabitants were Sunni Muslim.

== Bibliography ==
- Robinson, E.; Smith, E. (1841). Biblical Researches in Palestine, Mount Sinai and Arabia Petraea: A Journal of Travels in the year 1838. Vol. 3. Boston: Crocker & Brewster.
