= Mohamad Atwi =

Lebanese footballer (1987–2020)

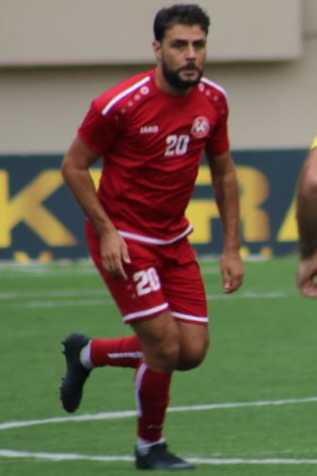
- Atwi with Akhaa Ahli Aley in 2019

Personal information
- Full name: Mohamad Ahmad Atwi
- Date of birth: 10 January 1987
- Place of birth: Harouf, Lebanon
- Date of death: 18 September 2020 (aged 33)
- Place of death: Beirut, Lebanon
- Height: 1.74 m (5 ft 9 in)
- Position: Attacking midfielder

Senior career*
Years	Team	Apps	(Gls)
2004–2006	Tripoli (Note: Olympic Beirut changed its name to AC Tripoli in 2005.)		(2)
2006–2008	Tadamon Sour		(0)
2008–2018	Ansar	114+	(24)
2017–2018	→ Tadamon Sour (loan)	17	(1)
2018–2020	Akhaa Ahli Aley	20	(1)
Total		?	(28)

International career
2011–2014	Lebanon	3	(0)
- * Club domestic league appearances and goals as of 20 April 2019

Mohamad Ahmad Atwi (Arabic: محمد أحمد عطوي; 10 January 1987 – 18 September 2020) was a Lebanese footballer who played as an attacking midfielder.

Atwi started his career at Olympic Beirut in 2004, remaining there in 2005 when they changed their name to AC Tripoli. He moved to Tadamon Sour in 2006, and then to Ansar in 2008, where he stayed for nine seasons. Atwi returned to Tadamon Sour on loan in 2017, and then moved to Akhaa Ahli Aley in 2018. Atwi also represented the Lebanon national team between 2011 and 2014, playing a game in the 2014 World Cup qualifiers.

On 21 August 2020, Atwi was hit in the head by a stray bullet. He died on 18 September 2020, after nearly one month in intensive care.

== Club career ==
Atwi began his career in 2004 at Olympic Beirut in the Lebanese Premier League, staying with the club the next season when they became AC Tripoli. Atwi then moved to Tadamon Sour in 2006, staying there two seasons, before moving to back-to-back league champions Ansar in 2008. He stayed at the Beirut-based club for nine seasons, returning Tadamon Sour on a season-long loan in 2017. In 2018 Atwi moved to Akhaa Ahli Aley, where he remained until his death in 2020.

== International career ==
Atwi made his debut for the Lebanon national team on 11 June 2013, coming off the bench to replace Mahmoud Kojok in the 67th minute of a 4–0 loss to Iran in a 2014 World Cup qualifier.

== Death ==
At around 10 am on 21 August 2020, Atwi was hit by a stray bullet to the head in the Cola area of Beirut, Lebanon, during the funeral of a firefighter who died at the 2020 Beirut explosion. He was rushed unconscious to the Makassed General Hospital, where he was given 16 units of blood due to extensive hemorrhaging. The medical staff was able to stop the bleeding without being able to extract the bullet, as it was located in a sensitive area of the brain. He was put in intensive care, in a medically induced coma.

On 24 August, Atwi's brother, Ali, stated that he was looking to sue whoever was behind the stray shot. On the morning of 18 September 2020, Atwi died from his injuries.

== Honours ==
Ansar

- Lebanese FA Cup: 2009–10, 2011–12, 2016–17
- Lebanese Super Cup: 2012

Individual

- Lebanese Premier League Best Goal: 2010–11, 2015–16
