= Sagesse SC (football) =

Lebanese association football club

Sagesse
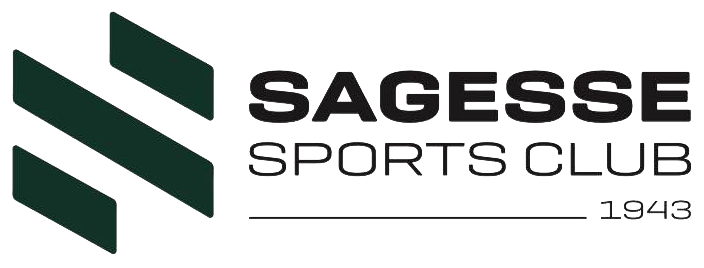
- Full name: Sagesse Sports Club
- Nickname: القَلعَة الخَضراء (The Green Castle)
- Founded: 14 October 1943; 83 years ago, as Cercle de la Sagesse
- Ground: Fouad Chehab Stadium
- Capacity: 5,000
- Chairman: Ragheb Haddad
- Manager: Paul Rustom
- League: Lebanese Premier League
- 2025–26: Lebanese Premier League, 6th of 12
- Website: sagesseclub.com
Home colours	Away colours

Sagesse Sports Club (French: Club Sportif La Sagesse, lit. 'The Wisdom Sports Club'), known as Hekmeh (Arabic: الحكمة) in Arabic, is a football club based in Achrafieh, a district in Beirut, Lebanon, that competes in the Lebanese Premier League, and is primarily supported by the Maronite Christian community.

The club was founded in 1943 as Cercle de la Sagesse. Although they have not won a major title, Sagesse came second in the Lebanese Premier League, in 2002, and were finalists in both the Lebanese FA Cup, in 2006 and 2026, and the Lebanese Federation Cup, in 2004.

== History ==
=== Early history ===
The Collège de la Sagesse school had a football club with their own students; at the end of each season, graduated players would go on to play for other senior teams, mainly Salam Achrafieh.

Sagesse's senior team were formed in 1942 under the patronage of Father Boulos Kik, the general director of the Sagesse Institute, supported by Monseigneur Jean Maroun. The club received their official license on 14 October 1943, and were formed as Cercle de la Sagesse by a group of former students, namely Edward Tyan, Camille Cordahi, Elie Khalife, and Negib Hobeika. Toutoungi was the club's first president.

The team first played in the 1943–44 Lebanese Second Division; initially formed of former students, the club later also accepted other players. They won the Second Division in their first season, and were due to be promoted to the Lebanese Premier League after beating Shabiba Mazraa 4–0 in the promotion play-offs. However, due to a technicality, Sagesse were allocated in the Second Division for the 1944–45 season. From the 1945–46 season, the club were known as Club de la Sagesse.

=== Recent history ===
In 2006 Sagesse reached the final of the Lebanese FA Cup, but lost against the cup holder Ansar 3–1. Sagesse finished second in the 2020–21 Lebanese Second Division, and were promoted back to the Lebanese Premier League after five years. They finished runners-up in the 2025–26 Lebanese FA Cup, losing 2–0 to Nejmeh in the final.

== Club rivalries ==
Sagesse plays the Achrafieh derby with Racing Beirut.

== Kit manufacturers ==
The following is a list of kit manufacturers worn by Sagesse.

Period	Kit manufacturer
1999–2012	Adidas
2012–2016	Legea
2016–2022	Jako
2022–present	Capelli Sport

== Stadium ==
Historically, Sagesse used the Bourj Hammoud Stadium as their home ground before moving to the Fouad Chehab Stadium in Jounieh.

In 2026, Sagesse announced they would be renovating the Ain Saadeh Stadium to use it as their home ground.

== Players ==
=== Current squad ===
As of 6 November 2026

Note: Flags indicate national team as defined under FIFA eligibility rules; some limited exceptions apply. Players may hold more than one non-FIFA nationality.

No.	Pos.	Nation	Player
1	GK	LBN	Mehdi Khalil
2	DF	LBN	Mohamad Khalife
3	DF	LBN	Shadi Skaf
4	DF	SEN	Djibril Gueye
6	MF	SEN	Issa Ndiaye
8	DF	LBN	Hassan Hammoud
9	FW	SEN	Ousmane Dieng
10	MF	SEN	Pape Ibrahima Ba
11	MF	GHA	Yaw Dasi Obuoba
12	DF	LBN	Ali Zbib
14	DF	LBN	Zaher Hassan
16	MF	LBN	Yorgo El Haddad
17	DF	LBN	Omar El Khoury
18	DF	LBN	Ahmad Haidar
19	MF	LBN	Gabriel Bassil

No.	Pos.	Nation	Player
19		LBN	Luka Assaf
20	MF	LBN	Ahmad Jalloul
21	FW	LBN	Ali Haidar
22	FW	LBN	Karl Zaylaa
23	DF	LBN	Roudy El Hajj
25	GK	LBN	Ahmad Kaawar
30	FW	LBN	Rabih Ataya
70	FW	LBN	Ali El Reda El Hajj
80	MF	SEN	Mansa Konaté
99	FW	LBN	Ahmad Hijazi
—	GK	LBN	Mohammad El Labban
—	DF	LBN	Hussein El Dor
—	MF	LBN	Michel Feghaly
—	FW	LBN	Georgio El Chammas

=== Notable players ===
Players in international competitions
Competition	Player	National team
2000 AFC Asian Cup	Ali Fakih	Lebanon
2000 AFC Asian Cup	Vardan Ghazaryan	Lebanon
2000 AFC Asian Cup	Fouad Hijazi	Lebanon

== Honours ==
- Lebanese Second Division
  - Winners (4): 1943–44, 1947–48, 1955–56, 1998–99
- Lebanese Premier League
  - Runners-up (1): 2001–02
- Lebanese FA Cup
  - Runners-up (2): 2005–06, 2025–26
- Lebanese Federation Cup
  - Runners-up (1): 2004

== Managerial history ==
- (Romania) Eugen Moldovan (2000–2001)
- (Germany) Theo Bücker (2001–2002)
- (Lebanon) Emile Rustom (2005)
- (Lebanon) Riad Murad
- (Lebanon) Fouad Hijazi
- (Lebanon) Fouad Leila
- (Lebanon) Sohad Zahran (–2021)
- (Lebanon) Vardan Ghazaryan (2021–2022)
- (Lebanon) Emile Rustom (2022–2023)
- (Lebanon) Paul Rustom (2023–present)

== See also ==
- Sagesse SC
- Sagesse SC (basketball)
- List of football clubs in Lebanon
