= Lebanese Challenge Cup =

Lebanese football annual cup competition

- Founded: 2013; 13 years ago
- Abolished: 2023; 3 years ago
- Region: Lebanon
- Teams: 6
- Last champions: Akhaa Ahli Aley (1st title)
- Most championships: Tadamon Sour; Shabab Sahel; Racing Beirut; Bourj (2 titles)

The Lebanese Challenge Cup (Arabic: كأس التحدي اللبناني) was a Lebanese football annual cup competition contested by the teams placed between 7th and 10th in the previous season of the Lebanese Premier League and the two newly promoted teams from the Lebanese Second Division.

Established in 2013, the most successful clubs in the competition are Tadamon Sour, Shabab Sahel, Racing Beirut and Bourj, all with two titles each. The competition was suspended in 2023, alongside the Lebanese Elite Cup, and was replaced by the Lebanese Federation Cup as the pre-season preparatory tournament.

== Winners and finalists ==
=== Winners by year ===
Lebanese Challenge Cup finals
No.	Season	Winners	Score	Runners–up
1st	2013	Tadamon Sour	0–0 (p)	Egtmaaey
2nd	2014	Shabab Sahel	1–0	Nabi Chit
3rd	2015	Shabab Sahel	3–1	Egtmaaey
4th	2016	Racing Beirut	5–1	Salam Zgharta
5th	2017	Racing Beirut	3–1	Tadamon Sour
6th	2018	Tadamon Sour	3–0	Chabab Ghazieh
7th	2019	Bourj	2–0	Salam Zgharta
8th	2021	Bourj	4–2	Tripoli
9th	2022	Akhaa Ahli Aley	1–0	Safa

=== Results by team ===
Club	Wins	Runners-up	Total final appearances
Tadamon Sour	2	1	3
Shabab Sahel	2	0	2
Racing Beirut	2	0	2
Bourj	2	0	2
Akhaa Ahli Aley	1	0	1
Egtmaaey	0	2	2
Salam Zgharta	0	2	2
Nabi Chit	0	1	1
Chabab Ghazieh	0	1	1
Tripoli	0	1	1
Safa	0	1	1

== See also ==
- Lebanese FA Cup
- Lebanese Super Cup
