= Akhaa Ahli Aley FC =

Lebanese association football club

Akhaa Ahli Aley
- Full name: Akhaa Ahli Aley Football Club
- Short name: Akhaa
- Founded: 1962; 64 years ago, as Akhaa Club; 1990; 36 years ago, as Akhaa Ahli Aley Football Club
- Ground: Amin Abdelnour Stadium
- Capacity: 3,500
- Chairman: Samer Khalaf
- Manager: Rabih Abou Fakher
- League: Lebanese Premier League
- 2025–26: Lebanese Second Division, 1st of 12 (promoted)
Home colours	Away colours

Akhaa Ahli Aley Football Club (Arabic: نادي الإخاء الأهلي الرياضي عاليه, lit. 'National Brotherhood of Aley Sporting Club'), commonly referred to as Akhaa Ahli Aley, Akhaa Ahli or simply Akhaa, is a football club based in Aley, Lebanon, that competes in the Lebanese Premier League, and is primarily supported by the Druze community.

Akhaa Ahli Aley won the Lebanese Challenge Cup in 2022. The club is supported by the Lebanese MP Arkram Chehayeb, who was the key person to ratify the merging of the two clubs Ahli and Akhaa in the city of Aley.

== History ==
=== Origins: Akhaa and Ahli ===
Akhaa was first founded in 1962 by Adel Baz, who led the club till the early 1980s amid the Lebanese Civil War. The club obtained its license in 1966 and was close to promotion in 1971, failing to reach the Lebanese Premier League in the last match. The club halted its activities in 1982 during the Lebanese war and resumed in 1989.

Ahli Club was established in the 1970s by Ahmad Radwan, an educator and the owner of a school in Aley. Ahli Club obtained its license later and joined the Lebanese Third Division in 1987. Various players who would go on to play in the Lebanese Premier League played for Ahli Club, such as Walid Zeineddine, Fouad Sayegh, Riad Al Halabi, Yazeed Halimi and others. Ahli Club was ranked first in the American University of Beirut Football Cup twice in a row, in 1987 and 1988.

=== Formation of Akhaa Ahli ===
In 1990, Bahij Abou Hamzeh, the president of Akhaa, realized that promotion to the Lebanese Premier League would be difficult, so he decided to merge with Ahli Club. The merger added extra value to Akhaa Club as Ahli's team was full of young players of Aley, such as Zaher Andary, who represented the Lebanon national football from 1994 to 2001, Said Abu Muna and Raji Abi Said, who was elected captain of Ahkaa Ahli. Ahli's management found the merger to be of mutual interest as they needed physical and logistical support to get promoted to the Lebanese Second Division.

=== Promotion and stay in the Premier League ===
Akhaa won the Lebanese Second Division in 1992–93. The team managed to hit excellent results during its stay in the Lebanese Premier League, especially in its first appearance. It returned to the first division in 2010–11.

On 21 August 2022, after defeating rivals Safa 1–0 in the final, Akhaa were crowned 2022 Lebanese Challenge Cup champions. Akhaa were relegated to the Lebanese Second Division, after finishing last in 2022–23. They were promoted back to the Premier League after finishing first in the 2025–26 Second Division.

== Club rivalries ==
Akhaa plays the "Mountain derby" with Safa.

== Players ==
=== Current squad ===
As of 7 November 2026

Note: Flags indicate national team as defined under FIFA eligibility rules; some limited exceptions apply. Players may hold more than one non-FIFA nationality.

No.	Pos.	Nation	Player
1	GK	LBN	Rabih Salha
4	DF	LBN	Jad Flayti
5	DF	LBN	Saad Fayad
6	FW	LBN	Adam Kobeissi
7		SEN	Insa Coly
8	FW	LBN	Hussein Awada
9	FW	SEN	Boucounta Sarr
10	FW	SEN	Cheikh Sène
11	FW	LBN	Karim Tarhini
14	DF	NGR	Abdullahi Muhammed
16		LBN	Nibal Abou Lteif
17	DF	LBN	Mohammad Shoumar
18	MF	LBN	Mahdi Tlays
20	FW	LBN	Paul Khater
21		LBN	Ali Hassan

No.	Pos.	Nation	Player
22	MF	LBN	Chadi Abdelkhalek
24	FW	NGR	Yusuf Akanni
30	FW	LBN	Mohammad El Saleh
33	GK	LBN	Ali Hjayrat
40	DF	SEN	Mamadou Touré
44		LBN	Majed Hilal
55	MF	LBN	Jaafar El Daly
66	FW	LBN	Issa Hammoud
70	FW	LBN	Ali Karaki
96	GK	LBN	Omar Idlibi
99		LBN	Hadi Malak
—	MF	LBN	Samer El Jawhari
—	FW	LBN	Dani Al Jurdi
—		LBN	Jack El Zeraoui

=== Notable players ===
Players in international competitions
Competition	Player	National team
2000 AFC Asian Cup	Abdul-Wahab Abu Al-Hail	Iraq
2000 AFC Asian Cup	Gilberto	Lebanon
2000 AFC Asian Cup	Marcílio	Lebanon

=== Retired numbers ===
In 2020, Akhaa Ahli Aley retired the squad number 20 for two seasons, in memory of Mohamad Atwi who died on 18 September 2020 from a stray bullet to the head.

- 20 (Lebanon) Mohamad Atwi, midfielder (2018–2020) – posthumous honour (2020–2022)

== Honours ==
- Lebanese Challenge Cup (defunct)
  - Winners (1): 2022
- Lebanese Second Division
  - Winners (3): 1992–93, 2002–03, 2025–26
- Lebanese Elite Cup (defunct)
  - Runners-up (1): 2018

== See also ==
- List of football clubs in Lebanon
