= Al-Manar Football Festival =

Annual Lebanese football award ceremony

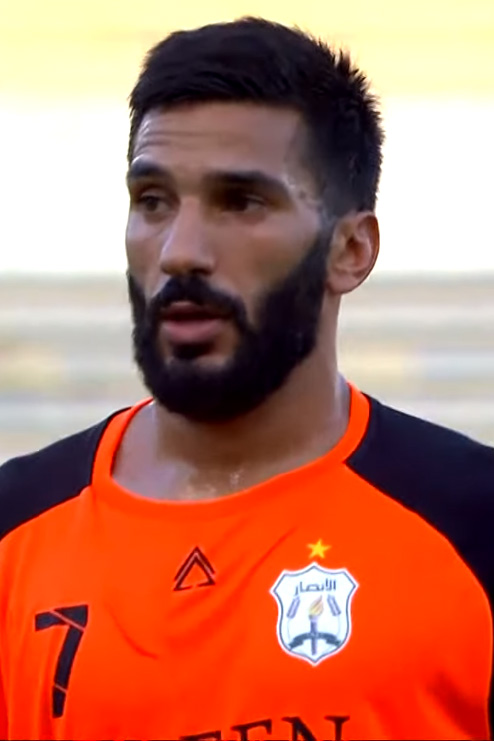
Hassan Maatouk won the Best Player award a record four times: in 2010, 2011, 2018, and 2019

The Al-Manar Football Festival (Arabic: مهرجان كرة المنار) was an event organised by the Al-Manar television station between the 1996–97 and 2018–19 seasons in order to award players, managers, referees and teams who were considered to have performed the best over the previous Lebanese Premier League season. Between the 2017–18 and 2018–19 seasons, the referendum to decide the winners of the awards was held online.

Lebanese forward Hassan Maatouk was awarded the Best Player award a record four times. Salih Sadir from Iraq is the foreign player with the most Best Player awards, having won it three times in a row. Lebanese coach Adnan Al Sharqi holds the most Best Coach awards, with four.

== Awards ==
=== Main categories ===
Season	Category				
Season	Best Player	Best Young Player	Top Scorer (Note: Players in italics were not awarded at the ceremony for being the top goalscorer/assist provider of the season.)	Top Assists	Best Coach
1996–97	(Lebanon) Vardan Ghazaryan (Homenetmen)	(Lebanon) Bilal Fleifel (Nejmeh)	(Trinidad and Tobago) Peter Prosper (Ansar)	Not awarded	(France) (Algeria) Rachid Mekhloufi (Nejmeh) (Lebanon) Adnan Al Sharqi (Ansar)
1997–98	(Iraq) Laith Hussein (Homenetmen)	(Lebanon) Tarek Al Samad (Riada Wal Adab)	(Syria) Abdul Latif Helou (Ansar)	Not awarded	(Lebanon) Adnan Al Sharqi (Ansar)
1998–99	(Trinidad and Tobago) Peter Prosper (Ansar)	(Lebanon) Nasrat Al Jamal (Tadamon Sour)	(Lebanon) Haitham Zein (Tadamon Sour)	Not awarded	(Lebanon) Adnan Al Sharqi (Ansar)
1999–2000	(Lebanon) Moussa Hojeij (Nejmeh)	(Lebanon) Agop Donabidian (Homenmen)	(Brazil) Toninho (Ansar)	Not awarded	(Iraq) Farouk El Sayed (Nejmeh)
2000–01	(Lebanon) Roda Antar (Tadamon Sour)	(Lebanon) Dany Nahle (Ansar)	(Lebanon) Haitham Zein (Tadamon Sour)	Not awarded	(Iraq) Akram Salman (Tadamon Sour)
2001–02	(Lebanon) Moussa Hojeij (Nejmeh)	(Lebanon) Abbas Ali Atwi (Bourj)	(Iraq) Haidar Mahmoud (Shabab Sahel)	Not awarded	(Germany) Theo Bücker (Sagesse)
2002–03	(Lebanon) Abbas Ali Atwi (Olympic Beirut)	(Lebanon) Ali El Atat (Mabarra)	(Brazil) Sílvio (Olympic Beirut)	Not awarded	(Syria) Mohammad Kwid (Ahed)
2003–04	(Brazil) Edílson (Olympic Beirut)	Not awarded	(Lebanon) Mohammad Kassas (Nejmeh)	Not awarded	(Syria) Mohammad Kwid (Ahed)
2004–05	(Lebanon) Yehia Hachem (Nejmeh)	(Lebanon) Hassan Maatouk (Ahed)	(Lebanon) Mohammad Kassas (Nejmeh)	Not awarded	(Lebanon) Adnan Al Sharqi (Ansar)
2005–06	(Lebanon) Abbas Ahmad Atwi (Nejmeh)	(Lebanon) Hassan Tahmaz	(Lebanon) Ali Nasseredine (Nejmeh)	Not awarded	(Iraq) Adnan Hamad (Ansar)
2006–07	(Iraq) Salih Sadir (Ansar)	(Lebanon) Hassan El Mohamad (Rayyan)	(Lebanon) Mohamad Ghaddar (Nejmeh)	(Lebanon) Abbas Ahmad Atwi (Nejmeh)	(Lebanon) Samir Saad (Safa)
2007–08	(Iraq) Salih Sadir (Ansar)	(Lebanon) Ali Bazzi (Sagesse)	(Lebanon) Mohamad Ghaddar (Nejmeh)	(Lebanon) Abbas Ali Atwi (Ahed)	(Lebanon) Samir Saad (Safa)
2008–09	(Iraq) Salih Sadir (Ahed)	(Lebanon) Kassem Leila (Ansar)	(Iraq) Salih Sadir (Ahed)	(Lebanon) Ahmad Zreik (Ahed)	(Lebanon) Emile Rustom (Nejmeh)
2009–10	(Lebanon) Hassan Maatouk (Ahed)	(Lebanon) Ali Reda Alawieh (Ahed)	(Senegal) Makhete Diop (Nejmeh)	(Lebanon) Abbas Ali Atwi (Ahed)	(Lebanon) Mahmoud Hammoud (Ahed)
2010–11	(Lebanon) Hassan Maatouk (Ahed)	(Lebanon) Shadi Skaf (Islah Borj Shmali)	(Lebanon) Hassan Maatouk (Ahed)	(Lebanon) Abbas Ahmad Atwi (Nejmeh)	(Lebanon) Mahmoud Hammoud (Ahed)
2011–12	(Lebanon) Bilal El Najjarine (Nejmeh)	(Lebanon) Alaa El Baba (Akhaa Ahli Aley)	(Lebanon) Mohamad Haidar (Safa)	(Lebanon) Khodr Salame (Safa)	(Lebanon) Moussa Hojeij (Nejmeh)
2012–13	(Lebanon) Mohamad Haidar (Safa)	(Lebanon) Philippe Paoli (Racing Beirut)	(Lebanon) Imad Ghaddar (Chabab Ghazieh)	(Lebanon) Abbas Ahmad Atwi (Nejmeh)	(Iraq) Akram Salman (Safa)
2013–14	(Lebanon) Abbas Ahmad Atwi (Nejmeh)	(Lebanon) Hassan Kourani (Shabab Sahel)	(Lebanon) Adnan Melhem (Racing Beirut) (Ivory Coast) Lassina Soro (Racing Beirut)	(Lebanon) Abbas Ahmad Atwi (Nejmeh)	(Germany) Theo Bücker (Nejmeh)
2014–15	(Lebanon) Haytham Faour (Ahed)	(Lebanon) Alex Boutros (Salam Zgharta)	(Argentina) Lucas Galán (Salam Zgharta)	(Syria) Khaled Al Saleh (Nabi Chit)	Not awarded
2015–16	(Lebanon) Mohamad Haidar (Safa)	(Lebanon) Mohamad Kdouh (Ahed)	(Argentina) Lucas Galán (Ansar)	(Lebanon) Mohamad Haidar (Safa)	(Lebanon) Emile Rustom (Safa)
2016–17	(Lebanon) Ahmad Zreik (Ahed)	(Lebanon) Hadi Khalil (Tadamon Sour)	(Lebanon) Abou Bakr Al-Mel (Tripoli)	(Senegal) Talla N'Diaye (Safa)	(Lebanon) Bassem Marmar (Ahed)
2017–18	(Lebanon) Hassan Maatouk (Nejmeh)	(Lebanon) Ali Al Haj (Nejmeh)	(Senegal) Elhadji Malick Tall (Ansar)	(Lebanon) Hassan Maatouk (Nejmeh)	(Lebanon) Bassem Marmar (Ahed)
2018–19	(Lebanon) Hassan Maatouk (Nejmeh)	(Lebanon) Karim Mekkaoui (Racing Beirut)	(Senegal) Elhadji Malick Tall (Ansar)	(Tunisia) Houssem Louati (Ansar)	(Lebanon) Bassem Marmar (Ahed)

=== Other categories ===
Season	Category				
Season	Best Goal	Best Save	Best Referee	Best Ass. Referee	Fair Play Award
1996–97	(Lebanon) Ahmad Al Saksouk (Ansar)	(Lebanon) Ali Fakih (Ansar)	Not awarded	Not awarded	Not awarded
1997–98	(Lebanon) Malek Hassoun (Ansar)	(Lebanon) Ahmad Sakr (Homenmen)	Not awarded	Not awarded	Nejmeh
1998–99	(Lebanon) Zaher Al Indari (Akhaa Ahli Aley)	(Lebanon) Ahmad Sakr (Homenmen)	Not awarded	Not awarded	Ansar
1999–2000	(Lebanon) Ghassan Choueikh (Majd)	(Lebanon) Ahmad Khalife (Homenetmen)	Not awarded	Not awarded	Homenetmen
2000–01	(Syria) Ali Cheikh Dib (Homenmen)	(Lebanon) Ahmad Sakr (Homenmen)	Not awarded	Not awarded	Nejmeh
2001–02	(Lebanon) Abbas Ahmad Atwi (Nejmeh)	Not awarded	Not awarded	Not awarded	Nejmeh
2002–03	(Lebanon) Moussa Hojeij (Nejmeh)	Not awarded	(Lebanon) Talaat Najm	(Lebanon) Haidar Kleit	Ahed
2003–04	Not awarded	Not awarded	(Lebanon) Nabil Ayyad	(Lebanon) Haidar Kleit	Nejmeh
2004–05	Not awarded	(Lebanon) Rabie El Kakhi (Akhaa Ahli Aley)	Not awarded	Not awarded	Nejmeh
2005–06	Not awarded	Not awarded	(Lebanon) Talaat Najm	(Lebanon) Haidar Kleit	Not awarded
2006–07	(Lebanon) Abbas Ahmad Atwi (Nejmeh)	Not awarded	(Lebanon) Talaat Najm	(Lebanon) Haidar Kleit	Sagesse
2007–08	Not awarded	Not awarded	(Lebanon) Talaat Najm	(Lebanon) Haidar Kleit	Ahed
2008–09	Not awarded	Not awarded	(Lebanon) Talaat Najm	(Lebanon) Hussein Issa	Salam Zgharta
2009–10	(Lebanon) Hassan Hammoud (Mabarra)	Not awarded	(Lebanon) Ali Sabbagh	(Lebanon) Ahmad Kawas	Sagesse
2010–11	(Lebanon) Mohamad Atwi (Ansar)	Not awarded	(Lebanon) Bashir Awasa	(Lebanon) Hadi Kassar	Nejmeh
2011–12	(Lebanon) Hussein Awada (Salam Sour)	Not awarded	(Lebanon) Radwan Ghandour	(Lebanon) Hussein Issa	Ansar
2012–13	(Brazil) Eduardo (Akhaa Ahli Aley)	Not awarded	(Lebanon) Radwan Ghandour	(Lebanon) Mohamad Rammal	Ahed
2013–14	(Lebanon) Abou Bakr Al-Mel (Salam Zgharta)	Not awarded	(Lebanon) Radwan Ghandour	(Lebanon) Bilal Zein	Nejmeh
2014–15	(Lebanon) Ali Nasseredine (Nabi Chit)	Not awarded	(Lebanon) Radwan Ghandour	(Lebanon) Ali Serhal	Not awarded
2015–16	(Lebanon) Mohamad Atwi (Ansar)	Not awarded	Not awarded	Not awarded	Nabi Chit
2016–17	(Lebanon) Jad El Zein (Ahed)	Not awarded	Not awarded	Not awarded	Ahed
2017–18	(Egypt) Mahmoud Fathalla (Nejmeh)	Not awarded	Not awarded	Not awarded	Ahed
2018–19	(Lebanon) Rabih Ataya (Ahed)	Not awarded	Not awarded	Not awarded	Shabab Sahel

=== Special awards ===
The following awards were awarded only in one or a few editions:

Category	Season	Recipient
Fan's Best Player	1998–99	(Lebanon) Moussa Hojeij (Nejmeh)
Fan's Best Player	2000–01	(Lebanon) Moussa Hojeij (Nejmeh)
Fan's Best Player	2002–03	(Lebanon) Moussa Hojeij (Nejmeh)
Best Fans	1998–99	Ahed
Best Goalkeeper	2006–07	(Lebanon) Mohamad Hammoud (Ahed)
Best Goalkeeper	2007–08	(Lebanon) Lary Mehanna (Ansar)
Best Goalkeeper	2008–09	(Lebanon) Abbas Chit (Shabab Sahel)
Best Goalkeeper	2009–10	(Lebanon) Bilal Kassab (Islah Borj Shmali)
Player of the Week	2007–08	(Lebanon) Hassan Maatouk (Ahed)
Player of the Week	2008–09	(Iraq) Salih Sadir (Ahed)
Player of the Week	2009–10	(Lebanon) Hassan Maatouk (Ahed)
Most Appearances	2009–10	(Lebanon) Hamza Abboud (Safa)
Most Appearances	2010–11	(Lebanon) Hassan Daher (Shabab Sahel)
Best Foreign Player	2014–15	(Tunisia) Mohamed Aziz Msakni (Ahed)
Best Foreign Player	2015–16	(Nigeria) Musa Kabiru (Shabab Sahel)
Best Foreign Player	2016–17	(Senegal) Dominique Mendy (Safa)
Best Foreign Player	2017–18	(Ghana) Issah Yakubu (Ahed)
Best Futsal Player	2017–18	(Lebanon) Ahmed Khairuddin

== Team of the Season ==
Season	Category			
Season	Goalkeeper	Defenders	Midfielders	Forwards
1996–97	(Lebanon) Ali Fakih (Ansar)	(Lebanon) Ibrahim Hosni (Riada Wal Adab) (Lebanon) Gevorg Karapetyan (Ansar) (Lebanon) Nabih Al Jurdi (Safa) (Lebanon) Gurgen Engibaryan (Tadamon Sour)	(Lebanon) Jamal Taha (Ansar) (Lebanon) Babken Melikyan (Homenmen) (Lebanon) Raed Abou Al Naser (Nejmeh) (Lebanon) Moussa Hojeij (Nejmeh)	(Lebanon) Wael Nazha (Tadamon Sour) (Lebanon) Vardan Ghazaryan (Homenetmen)
1997–98	(Lebanon) Ali Fakih (Ansar)	(Lebanon) Gevorg Karapetyan (Ansar) (Lebanon) Gurgen Engibaryan (Homenmen) (Lebanon) Nabih Al Jurdi (Safa) (Lebanon) Munir Hussein (Ansar)	(Lebanon) Malek Hassoun (Ansar) (Iraq) Laith Hussein (Ansar) (Lebanon) Chadi Karnib (Safa) (Lebanon) Moussa Hojeij (Nejmeh)	(Lebanon) Wael Nazha (Tadamon Sour) (Lebanon) Tero Kehyeyan (Homenetmen)
1998–99	(Lebanon) Wahid El Fattal (Nejmeh)	(Lebanon) Gevorg Karapetyan (Ansar) (Nigeria) Sunday Okoh (Nejmeh) (Lebanon) Nabih Al Jurdi (Safa) (Lebanon) Faisal Antar (Tadamon Sour)	(Lebanon) Jamal Taha (Ansar) (Iraq) Laith Hussein (Ansar) (Lebanon) Chadi Karnib (Safa) (Lebanon) Moussa Hojeij (Nejmeh)	(Lebanon) Haitham Zein (Tadamon Sour) (Trinidad and Tobago) Peter Prosper (Ansar)
1999–2000	(Lebanon) Wahid El Fattal (Nejmeh)	(Lebanon) Hussein Daher (Nejmeh) (Nigeria) Sunday Okoh (Nejmeh) (Lebanon) Mohamad Halawi (Nejmeh) (Lebanon) Faisal Antar (Tadamon Sour)	(Nigeria) Ademola Ikudaissi (Nejmeh) (Lebanon) Roda Antar (Tadamon Sour) (Mali) Didier Tamboura (Homenetmen) (Lebanon) Moussa Hojeij (Nejmeh)	(Lebanon) Rabih Osman (Salam Zgharta) (Lebanon) Vardan Ghazaryan (Homenetmen)
2000–01	(Lebanon) Ali Fakih (Sagesse)	(Lebanon) Gurgen Engibaryan (Tadamon Sour) (Syria) Hisham Shleikh (Safa) (Lebanon) Mohamad Halawi (Nejmeh) (Lebanon) Marcílio (Akhaa Ahli Aley)	(Brazil) Marcílio Sandra (Ansar) (Lebanon) Roda Antar (Tadamon Sour) (Lebanon) Faisal Antar (Tadamon Sour) (Lebanon) Moussa Hojeij (Nejmeh)	(Trinidad and Tobago) Errol McFarlane (Nejmeh) (Brazil) Tommy Giacomelli (Sagesse)
2001–02	(Lebanon) Ali Fakih (Shabab Sahel)	(Lebanon) Gurgen Engibaryan (Tadamon Sour) (Lebanon) Imad Al Miri (Tadamon Sour) (Lebanon) Faisal Antar (Tadamon Sour)	(Armenia) Hamlet Mkhitaryan (Homenmen) (Lebanon) Nasrat Al Jamal (Tadamon Sour) (Lebanon) Abbas Ahmad Atwi (Nejmeh) (Lebanon) Moussa Hojeij (Nejmeh)	(Lebanon) Mohammad Kassas (Sagesse) (Nigeria) Darlington Chigoze (Bourj) (Iraq) Mahmood Majeed (Shabab Sahel)
2002–03	(Lebanon) Ziad Al Samad (Ansar)	(South Africa) Pierre Issa (Olympic Beirut) (Lebanon) Youssef Mohamad (Olympic Beirut) (Lebanon) Abbas Kenaan (Ahed)	(Lebanon) Nabil Baalbaki (Olympic Beirut) (Lebanon) Khaled Hamieh (Nejmeh) (Lebanon) Ali Attar (Ahed) (Lebanon) Abbas Ali Atwi (Olympic Beirut) (Lebanon) Moussa Hojeij (Nejmeh)	(Brazil) Sílvio (Olympic Beirut) (Lebanon) Ahmad Itani (Ahed)
2003–04	(Lebanon) Ziad Al Samad (Ansar)	(Lebanon) Hussein Daher (Nejmeh) (Lebanon) Youssef Mohamad (Olympic Beirut) (Lebanon) Abbas Kenaan (Ahed) (Lebanon) Khaled Hamieh (Nejmeh) (Lebanon) Ali Attar (Ahed)	(Lebanon) Mohamad Halawi (Nejmeh) (Brazil) Edílson (Olympic Beirut) (Lebanon) Moussa Hojeij (Nejmeh)	(Lebanon) Mohammad Kassas (Sagesse) (Lebanon) Ali Nasseredine (Safa)
2004–05	(Lebanon) Ziad Al Samad (Ansar)	(Brazil) Fábio (Ansar) (Lebanon) Mohamad Halawi (Nejmeh) (Lebanon) Abbas Kenaan (Ahed) (Lebanon) Imad Al Miri (Tadamon Sour) (Lebanon) Faisal Antar (Tadamon Sour)	(Lebanon) Yehia Hachem (Nejmeh) (Lebanon) Nasrat Al Jamal (Tadamon Sour) (Lebanon) Moussa Hojeij (Nejmeh)	(Lebanon) Mohammad Kassas (Nejmeh) (Armenia) Armen Shahgeldyan (Ahed)
2005–06	(Lebanon) Lary Mehanna (Ansar) (Lebanon) Ahmad Sakr (Nejmeh)	(Brazil) Fábio (Ansar) (Lebanon) Ali Mteirek (Olympic Beirut) (Lebanon) Ali Al Saadi (Safa) (Lebanon) Khaled Hamieh (Nejmeh) (Lebanon) Faisal Antar (Tadamon Sour)	(Lebanon) Nabil Baalbaki (Olympic Beirut) (Lebanon) Abbas Ali Atwi (Olympic Beirut) (Lebanon) Abbas Ahmad Atwi (Nejmeh)	(Lebanon) Ali Nasseredine (Nejmeh) (Lebanon) Hassan Maatouk (Ahed)
2006–07	(Lebanon) Lary Mehanna (Ansar)	(Lebanon) Ali Al Saadi (Safa) (Lebanon) Hussein Hamdan (Sagesse) (Iraq) Bassim Abbas (Nejmeh) (Lebanon) Ossama Haidar (Ahed) (Lebanon) Ali Mteirek (Ansar)	(Lebanon) Nabil Baalbaki (Ansar) (Iraq) Salih Sadir (Ansar) (Lebanon) Abbas Ahmad Atwi (Nejmeh)	(Lebanon) Mohamad Ghaddar (Nejmeh) (Lebanon) Mahmoud El Ali (Ahed)
2007–08	(Lebanon) Hassan Bittar (Mabarra)	(Nigeria) Kenneth Ikwugbado (Mabarra) (Lebanon) Ali Al Saadi (Safa) (Lebanon) Ramez Dayoub (Safa) (Lebanon) Mohamed Baker Younes (Racing Beirut) (Lebanon) Mohamad Korhani (Safa)	(Lebanon) Nabil Baalbaki (Ansar) (Iraq) Salih Sadir (Ansar) (Lebanon) Abbas Ali Atwi (Ahed)	(Lebanon) Mohamad Ghaddar (Nejmeh) (Lebanon) Mahmoud El Ali (Ahed)
2008–09	(Lebanon) Abbas Chit (Shabab Sahel)	(Lebanon) Hassan Daher (Shabab Sahel) (Lebanon) Bilal El Najjarine (Nejmeh) (Lebanon) Ali Al Saadi (Safa) (Lebanon) Ali Hamam (Nejmeh) (Lebanon) Ahmad Zreik (Ahed)	(Lebanon) Mohamad Halawi (Ahed) (Lebanon) Hassan Maatouk (Ahed) (Lebanon) Zakaria Charara (Nejmeh)	(Iraq) Salih Sadir (Ahed) (Lebanon) Mohammad Kassas (Safa)
2009–10	(Lebanon) Mohamed Hammoud (Ahed)	(Brazil) Fábio (Ahed) (Lebanon) Bilal El Najjarine (Nejmeh) (Lebanon) Abbas Kenaan (Ahed) (Lebanon) Imad Al Miri (Racing Beirut) (Lebanon) Hussein Dakik (Ahed)	(Lebanon) Nabil Baalbaki (Ansar) (Lebanon) Abbas Ahmad Atwi (Nejmeh) (Lebanon) Abbas Ali Atwi (Ahed)	(Lebanon) Hassan Maatouk (Ahed) (Senegal) Makhete Diop (Nejmeh)
2010–11	(Lebanon) Mohamed Hammoud (Ahed)	(Brazil) Ramos (Ansar) (Lebanon) Ali Al Saadi (Safa) (Lebanon) Abbas Kenaan (Ahed) (Lebanon) Imad Al Miri (Racing Beirut) (Lebanon) Hussein Dakik (Ahed)	(Lebanon) Mouhamad Chamass (Nejmeh) (Lebanon) Hassan Maatouk (Ahed) (Lebanon) Abbas Ali Atwi (Ahed)	(Lebanon) Tarek El Ali (Mabarra) (Lebanon) Mahmoud El Ali (Ahed)
2011–12	(Lebanon) Ziad Al Samad (Safa)	(Lebanon) Bilal El Najjarine (Nejmeh) (Lebanon) Ali Al Saadi (Safa) (Lebanon) Ali Hamam (Nejmeh) (Lebanon) Hussein Dakik (Ahed)	(Libya) Ibrahim Al Haasy (Ansar) (Lebanon) Haytham Faour (Ahed) (Lebanon) Ahmad Zreik (Ahed) (Lebanon) Mohamad Haidar (Safa) (Lebanon) Khodr Salame (Safa)	(Lebanon) Mahmoud El Ali (Ahed)
2012–13	(Lebanon) Ziad Al Samad (Safa)	(Lebanon) Hassan Daher (Shabab Sahel) (Morocco) Tarek Al Omrati (Safa) (Lebanon) Ali Hamam (Nejmeh) (Lebanon) Walid Ismail (Racing Beirut)	(Lebanon) Haytham Faour (Ahed) (Lebanon) Hassan El Mohamad (Nejmeh) (Lebanon) Mohamad Haidar (Safa) (Lebanon) Abbas Ali Atwi (Ahed)	(Mali) Ulysse Diallo (Shabab Sahel) (Lebanon) Hassan Chaito (Ahed)
2013–14	(Lebanon) Mohamad Hammoud (Nejmeh)	(Lebanon) Nour Mansour (Safa) (Nigeria) Admil Precious (Racing Beirut) (Lebanon) Ali Hamam (Nejmeh) (Lebanon) Walid Ismail (Nejmeh)	(Lebanon) Hamzeh Salameh (Safa) (Senegal) Cheikha Sy (Nejmeh) (Lebanon) Khaled Takaji (Nejmeh) (Lebanon) Abbas Ahmad Atwi (Nejmeh)	(Lebanon) Adnan Melhem (Racing Beirut) (Lebanon) Hassan Chaito (Ahed)
2014–15	(Lebanon) Mohamad Hammoud (Ahed)	(Lebanon) Abdallah Taleb (Tripoli) (Lebanon) Khalil Khamis (Ahed) (Lebanon) Hussein Zein (Ahed) (Lebanon) Mohamad Korhani (Ansar)	(Lebanon) Haytham Faour (Ahed) (Lebanon) Khaled Takaji (Nejmeh) (Senegal) Cheikha Sy (Nejmeh) (Lebanon) Abbas Ali Atwi (Ahed)	(Ghana) Michael Helegbe (Tripoli) (Tunisia) Iheb Msakni (Ahed)
2015–16	(Lebanon) Mehdi Khalil (Safa)	(Lebanon) Ali Al Saadi (Safa) (Lebanon) Khalil Khamis (Ahed) (Lebanon) Mohamad Zein Tahan (Safa) (Lebanon) Hussein Dakik (Ahed)	(Lebanon) Mohamad Haidar (Safa) (Lebanon) Ahmad Zreik (Ahed) (Lebanon) Rabih Ataya (Ansar) (Lebanon) Abbas Ali Atwi (Ahed) (Lebanon) Ahmad Jalloul (Safa)	(Argentina) Lucas Galán (Ansar)
2016–17	(Lebanon) Mostafa Matar (Salam Zgharta)	(Cameroon) Standly Echabe (Safa) (Lebanon) Nour Mansour (Ahed) (Lebanon) Nassar Nassar (Ansar) (Lebanon) Nader Matar (Nejmeh)	(Lebanon) Haytham Faour (Ahed) (Lebanon) Hussein Monzer (Ahed) (Lebanon) Mahdi Fahs (Ahed) (Lebanon) Abou Bakr Al-Mel (Tripoli) (Lebanon) Ahmad Zreik (Ahed)	(Lebanon) Akram Moghrabi (Nejmeh)
2017–18	(Lebanon) Mehdi Khalil (Ahed)	(Lebanon) Nour Mansour (Ahed) (Lebanon) Ahmad Atwi (Akhaa Ahli Aley) (Lebanon) Hussein Zein (Ahed) (Lebanon) Mohamad Zein Tahan (Safa)	(Lebanon) Haytham Faour (Ahed) (Ghana) Issah Yakubu (Ahed) (Lebanon) Ahmad Zreik (Ahed) (Lebanon) Hassan Maatouk (Nejmeh) (Lebanon) Mohamad Haidar (Ahed)	(Senegal) Elhadji Malick Tall (Ansar)
2018–19	(Lebanon) Mehdi Khalil (Ahed)	(Lebanon) Khalil Khamis (Ahed) (Lebanon) Kassem El Zein (Nejmeh) (Lebanon) Hussein Dakik (Ahed) (Lebanon) Hussein Zein (Ahed)	(Lebanon) Adnan Haidar (Ansar) (Lebanon) Hassan Maatouk (Nejmeh) (Tunisia) Houssem Louati (Ansar) (Lebanon) Hussein Monzer (Ahed) (Lebanon) Abbas Ali Atwi (Ansar)	(Senegal) Elhadji Malick Tall (Ansar)

== See also ==
- Football in Lebanon
- List of Lebanese Premier League top scorers by season
