= Faisal Antar =

Lebanese footballer (born 1978)

Personal information
- Full name: Faisal Abdelhassan Antar
- Date of birth: 20 December 1978 (age 47)
- Place of birth: Freetown, Sierra Leone
- Height: 1.85 m (6 ft 1 in)
- Position: Defender

Senior career*
Years	Team	Apps	(Gls)
1998–2002	Tadamon Sour		(13)
2002–2005	Olympic Beirut		(9+)
2005–2007	Nejmeh		(3)
2007–2009	Mabarra		(9)
2009–2010	Tadamon Sour		(6)
2011–2012	Tadamon Sour	2	(0)
Total		?	(40+)

International career
1999	Lebanon U21		
2002	Lebanon U23		
1998–2007	Lebanon	54	(5)
- * Club domestic league appearances and goals

Faisal Abdelhassan Antar (Arabic: فيصل عبد الحسن عنتر; born 20 December 1978) is a former footballer. Born in Sierra Leone, he played as a defender for the Lebanon national team.

Antar played his entire career in the Lebanese Premier League, for Tadamon Sour, Olympic Beirut, Nejmeh, and Mabarra. He played for Lebanon at the 2000 AFC Asian Cup, where he had been present for the national team from 1998 to 2007. In June 2010, Antar announced his retirement and became a Hall of Famer in the Lebanese Football Association. He is the brother of former footballer Roda Antar.

== Club career ==
Antar started his senior career at Lebanese Premier League side Tadamon Sour during the 1998–99 season. Antar helped Tadamon win their first Lebanese FA Cup, in 2000–01, after beating Ansar 2–1 in the final. In 2002 Antar moved to Olympic Beirut, winning the domestic double (league and cup) in his first season at the club (2002–03).

After three seasons at Tadamon, Antar moved to Nejmeh in summer of 2005, following a week-long trial in January 2005 at Scottish club Rangers. In his first season at Nejmeh, Antar won the 2005 Lebanese Elite Cup.

In 2007, Antar moved to Mabarra, with whom he won the club's first FA Cup title (2007–08). In 2009 Antar returned to Tadamon Sour, where he remained until 2010, after which he decided to retire from football. In 2011 he withdrew his decision to retire, and played two games for Tadamon during the 2011–12 season.

== International career ==
Antar featured for Lebanon U21 in 1999, in a fixture against the Czech Republic. Antar made his senior international debut for Lebanon on 27 September 1998, at the 1998 Arab Nations Cup; Lebanon lost 4–1 to Saudi Arabia. Antar's first international goal came on 25 April 2001, in a friendly against the Philippines; he helped Lebanon win 3–0.

== Personal life ==
Faisal Antar is the brother of former Lebanon national team captain Roda Antar.

== Career statistics ==
=== International ===
Scores and results list Lebanon's goal tally first.

#	Date	Venue	Opponent	Score	Result	Competition
1.	25 April 2001	Tripoli Municipal Stadium, Tripoli	Philippines	2–0	3–0	Friendly
2.	26 May 2001	Suphachalasai Stadium, Bangkok	Pakistan	1–0	8–1	2002 World Cup qualifier
3.	28 May 2001	Suphachalasai Stadium, Bangkok	Sri Lanka	2–0	5–0	2002 World Cup qualifier
4.	8 September 2004	Rasmee Dhandu Stadium, Malé	Maldives	2–0	5–2	2006 FIFA World Cup qualification

== Honours ==
Tadamon Sour

- Lebanese FA Cup: 2000–01

Olympic Beirut

- Lebanese Premier League: 2002–03
- Lebanese FA Cup: 2002–03

Mabarra

- Lebanese FA Cup: 2007–08

Individual

- Lebanese Premier League Team of the Season: 1998–99, 1999–2000, 2000–01, 2001–02, 2004–05, 2005–06

== See also ==
- List of Lebanon international footballers
- List of Lebanon international footballers born outside Lebanon
- List of association football families
