= Ziad Al Samad =

Lebanese footballer and coach (born 1978)

Personal information
- Full name: Ziad Ali Al Samad
- Date of birth: 6 August 1978 (age 48)
- Place of birth: Kuwait
- Height: 1.79 m (5 ft 10 in)
- Position: Goalkeeper

Team information
- Current team: Safa (goalkeeper coach)

Senior career*
Years	Team	Apps	(Gls)
1997–1998	Riada Wal Adab		
1999–2008	Ansar		
2008–2011	Racing Beirut		
2011–2014	Safa	63	(0)
2014–2015	Saham		

International career
1999–2012	Lebanon	47	(0)

Managerial career
- 2020–2026: Lebanon U23 (goalkeeper)
- 2021–2022: AC Sporting (goalkeeper)
- 2022–2025: Ansar (goalkeeper)
- 2025–: Safa (goalkeeper)
- * Club domestic league appearances and goals

Ziad Ali Al Samad (Arabic: زياد علي الصمد; born 6 August 1978) is a professional football coach and former player who is the goalkeeper coach of Lebanese Premier League club Safa. Born in Kuwait, he played as a goalkeeper for the Lebanon national team.

== Club career ==
Al Samad started his senior club career at Lebanese Premier League club Riada Wal Adab, before moving to Ansar during the 1999–2000 season. In his first season at the club, Al Samad won both the Lebanese Federation Cup, and the Lebanese Super Cup. The following season, in 2000–01, Al Samad helped Ansar win both the Lebanese Elite Cup, and the Federation Cup. In 2001–02, Al Samad won the Lebanese FA Cup, before helping Ansar winning two consecutive domestic doubles (league and cup), in 2005–06 and 2006–07.

In 2008, Al Samad moved to Racing Beirut, staying there for three seasons. In 2011 he moved to 2008 AFC Cup runners-up Safa. In his three seasons at the club, Al Samad would help Safa win two league titles (2011–12, 2012–13), an FA Cup (2012–13), another Elite Cup (2012), and a Super Cup (2013).

On 30 September 2014, Safa sold Al Samad to Bahraini side Saham on a one-season deal. Following the 2014–15 Oman Professional League season, Al Samad retired from football.

== International career ==
Al Samad made his senior international debut for Lebanon on 1 September 2002 at the 2002 WAFF Championship, against Jordan; Lebanon lost 1–0. The goalkeeper's first clean sheet came on 26 December 2002, at the 2002 Arab Nations Cup, in a goalless draw against Bahrain.

Al Samad ended his international career with 47 caps for the Lebanon national team.

== Managerial career ==
On 12 August 2020, Al Samad was appointed goalkeeper coach of the Lebanon national under-23 team. He became goalkeeper coach of Lebanese Premier League side AC Sporting on 18 June 2021. On 27 September 2021, following Jamal Taha's appointment as head coach, Al Samad was confirmed goalkeeper coach of Lebanon U23. On 28 June 2022, he was appointed goalkeeper coach of Ansar.

== Honours ==
Ansar

- Lebanese Premier League: 2005–06, 2006–07
- Lebanese FA Cup: 2001–02, 2005–06, 2006–07
- Lebanese Elite Cup: 2000
- Lebanese Federation Cup: 1999, 2000
- Lebanese Super Cup: 1999

Safa

- Lebanese Premier League: 2011–12, 2012–13
- Lebanese FA Cup: 2012–13
- Lebanese Elite Cup: 2012
- Lebanese Super Cup: 2013

Individual

- Lebanese Premier League Team of the Season: 2002–03, 2003–04, 2004–05, 2011–12, 2012–13

== See also ==
- List of Lebanon international footballers
- List of Lebanon international footballers born outside Lebanon
