= Abbas Kenaan =

Lebanese footballer (born 1986)

Personal information
- Full name: Abbas Abdo Kenaan
- Date of birth: 20 April 1986 (age 40)
- Place of birth: Baalbek, Lebanon
- Height: 1.83 m (6 ft 0 in)
- Position: Defender

Senior career*
Years	Team	Apps	(Gls)
2000–2001	Bourj		(0)
2001–2018	Ahed		(5)
2018–2019	Shabab El Bourj		

International career
2003–2011	Lebanon	28	(0)

Managerial career
- 2022–: Ahed (Youth)
- * Club domestic league appearances and goals

Abbas Abdo Kenaan (Arabic: عباس عبدو كنعان; born 25 November 1982) is a Lebanese football manager and former footballer who played as a defender.

After one year at Bourj, Kenaan played his whole senior club career at Ahed; he also represented Lebanon internationally between 2003 and 2011.

== Honours ==
Bourj

- Lebanese Second Division: 2000–01

Ahed

- Lebanese Premier League: 2007–08, 2009–10, 2010–11, 2014–15
- Lebanese FA Cup: 2003–04, 2004–05, 2008–09, 2010–11
- Lebanese Elite Cup: 2008, 2010, 2011, 2013, 2015
- Lebanese Federation Cup: 2004
- Lebanese Super Cup: 2008, 2010, 2011, 2015

Individual

- Lebanese Premier League Team of the Season: 2003–04, 2004–05, 2009–10, 2010–11
