= Ali Fakih =

Lebanese football player and coach

Personal information
- Full name: Ali Reda Fakih
- Date of birth: 12 April 1967 (age 59)
- Place of birth: Kafr Kila, Lebanon
- Height: 1.80 m (5 ft 11 in)
- Position: Goalkeeper

Team information
- Current team: Shabab Sahel (goalkeeper coach)

Youth career
- 1983–1986: Racing Beirut

Senior career*
Years	Team	Apps	(Gls)
1986–1989	Racing Beirut		
1989–1992	Shabab Sahel		
1992–1999	Ansar		
1999–2001	Sagesse		
2001–2006	Shabab Sahel		

International career
1990–1992	Lebanon U23		
1993–2001	Lebanon	37	(0)

Managerial career
- Ansar (goalkeeper)
- Shabab Sahel (goalkeeper)
- 2019–2020: Al Raya
- 2020–: Shabab Sahel (goalkeeper)
- * Club domestic league appearances and goals

Ali Reda Fakih (Arabic: علي رضا فقيه; born 12 April 1967) is a Lebanese football coach and former player who is the goalkeeper coach of Lebanese Premier League club Shabab Sahel.

As a player, Fakih played as a goalkeeper. During the 1996–97 season, Fakih set a world record for most consecutive minutes without conceding a goal, at 1,511 minutes. At international level, Fakih represented Lebanon at the 2000 AFC Asian Cup.

== Club career ==
Coming through the youth system, Fakih started his senior club career with Racing Beirut. In 1989 Fakih left Racing to join Shabab Sahel, where he played two seasons.

He played for Ansar between 1992 and 1999, winning seven Lebanese Premier League titles and five Lebanese FA Cups. Fakih is the Guinness World Record holder for most consecutive minutes without conceding a goal. He didn't concede a goal for 1,511 minutes, while keeping 16 clean sheets in the 1996–97 season, beating the record previously set by Chris Woods of Rangers.

Fakih joined Sagesse in 1999 for two years, before returning to Shabab Sahel, where he retired after playing for five seasons.

== International career ==
Fakih played for the Lebanon national under-23 team between 1990 and 1992. He was first called up to the senior national team in 1992, remaining a regular until 2002. He was Lebanon's first-choice goalkeeper at the 2000 AFC Asian Cup.

== Managerial career ==
After his retirement, Fakih became a goalkeeper coach, working at Ansar and Shabab Sahel. In 2020, Fakih is the first team manager of Third Division side Al Raya. In 2020 he was re-appointed goalkeeper coach of Shabab Sahel.

== Honours ==
Individual

- Lebanese Premier League Best Save: 1996–97
- Lebanese Premier League Team of the Season: 1996–97, 1997–98, 2000–01, 2001–02

== See also ==
- List of Lebanon international footballers
