= Gurgen Engibaryan =

Lebanese footballer (born 1964)

Personal information
- Full name: Gurgen Vazgen Engibaryan
- Date of birth: 10 March 1964 (age 62)
- Place of birth: Armenian SSR, Soviet Union
- Height: 1.72 m (5 ft 8 in)
- Position: Midfielder

Senior career*
Years	Team	Apps	(Gls)
1983	Ararat Yerevan	0	(0)
1984	Spartak Oktemberyan	31	(2)
1986	Olympia Ashtarak	8	(0)
1986	Kotayk	8	(0)
1987–1993	Ararat Yerevan	136	(6)
1993–2000	Homenmen		
2000–2003	Tadamon Sour		

International career
1995–2001	Lebanon	51	(1)
- * Club domestic league appearances and goals

Gurgen Vazgen Engibaryan (Note: Also spelled Korken Yenkibarian) (Armenian: Գուրգեն Վազգենի Ենգիբարյան; Arabic: كوركن فازكين ينكيباريان; born 19 March 1964) is a former footballer who played as a midfielder. Born in the Soviet Union, Engibaryan played for the Lebanon national team.

== Club career ==
Born in the Armenian SSR, Soviet Union, he started his club career in Armenia at Olympia Ashtarak, before moving to Kotayk and then Ararat Yerevan, where he played over 100 league matches. In 1995 he moved to Lebanon, playing for Homenmen; he moved to Tadamon Sour in 2000, ending his career three years later.

== International career ==
Engibaryan acquired Lebanese nationality through naturalization in 1995 to be able to play for the Lebanon national team, playing in the 2000 AFC Asian Cup. He represented Lebanon between 1995 and 2001, scoring once.

== Honours ==
Aratat Yerevan

- Armenian Premier League: 1993
- Armenian Cup: 1993

Homenmen

- Lebanese Elite Cup: 1999
- Lebanese FA Cup runner-up: 1997–98, 1998–99
- Lebanese Super Cup runner-up: 1999

Tadamon Sour

- Lebanese FA Cup: 2000–01

Individual

- Lebanese Premier League Team of the Season: 1996–97, 1997–98, 2000–01, 2001–02

== See also ==
- List of Lebanon international footballers born outside Lebanon
