= Peter Prosper =

Trinidadian footballer (born 1969)

Personal information
- Date of birth: 11 November 1969 (age 56)
- Place of birth: Trinidad and Tobago
- Position: Striker

Senior career*
| Years | Team | Apps | (Gls) |
| 1995–1996 | United Petrotrin | | |
| 1996–2003 | Al Ansar | | |
| 2003–2004 | SWIF | | |
| 2004 | South Starworld Strikers | | |
| 2004 | San Juan Jabloteh | | |
| 2004–2005 | Akhaa Ahli Aley | | |
| 2005 | United Petrotrin | | |
| 2006 | San Juan Jabloteh | | |
| 2007 | United Petrotrin | | |
| 2007–2008 | Al Mabarra | | |
| 2008–2009 | Racing Beirut | | |

International career
- Trinidad and Tobago U23
| 1996–2003 | Trinidad and Tobago | 18 | (8) |
- * Club domestic league appearances and goals

Peter Prosper (born 11 November 1969) is a Trinidadian former footballer who played as a striker.

Prosper spent his club career between Trinidad and Tobago and Lebanon, playing for United Petrotrin, Al Ansar, South Starworld Strikers, San Juan Jabloteh, Akhaa Ahli Aley, Al Mabarra, and Racing Beirut. He also played for the Trinidad and Tobago national team between 1996 and 2003, representing them at the 1998 CONCACAF Gold Cup.

== Early life ==
Prosper was a student at the Presentation College in San Fernando, Trinidad and Tobago.

== Club career ==
Prosper began his senior career at TT Pro League club United Petrotrin during the 1995 season. After two seasons in Trinidad and Tobago, in 1996 Prosper moved to Lebanon, joining Lebanese Premier League reigning champions Al Ansar. In his first season in Lebanon, Prosper won the 1996–97 league title as the competition's top goalscorer with 22 goals. He was also nominated Al Ansar FC Player of the Year. With Al Ansar, Prosper won the league title three consecutive seasons (1997 to 1999), as well as the Lebanese FA Cup in 2001–02.

In 2003 Prosper moved back to United Petrotrin (SWIF), before joining South Starworld Strikers in January 2004. He signed for San Juan Jabloteh in October 2004, scoring a hat-trick on his debut. He moved back to Lebanon at Akhaa Ahli Aley for the 2004–05 season, scoring three goals, before moving back to United Petronin the following season. In March 2006 played for San Juan Jabloteh, before joining United Petrotrin once again the same month.

He left United Petrotrin in July 2007 to return to Lebanon once again, signing with Al Mabarra; he won the 2007–08 Lebanese FA Cup. He ended his career with Racing Beirut in Lebanon during the 2008–09 season.

== International career ==
Prosper represented Trinidad and Tobago at under-23 level. He made his senior debut for Trinidad and Tobago on 21 March 1996, in a friendly against Colombia; the match ended in a 3–0 away defeat. His first goals came in the form on a brace against Saint Kitts and Nevis in the 1997 Caribbean Cup, on 13 July 1997, scoring twice to help his side win 4–0.

Prosper represented Trinidad and Tobago at the 1998 CONCACAF Gold Cup, coming on as a substitute against Mexico in a 4–2 defeat on 4 February 1998. On 5 June 1999, he scored a hat-trick against Grenada at the 1999 Caribbean Cup; his side won the encounter 7–0. Prosper earned a total of 17 international caps for Trinidad and Tobago between 1996 and 2003, scoring seven goals.

== Career statistics ==
=== International ===
Appearances and goals by national team and year
| National team | Year | Apps | Goals |
|---|---|---|---|
| Trinidad and Tobago | 1995 | 1 | 1 |
| Trinidad and Tobago | 1996 | 3 | 0 |
| Trinidad and Tobago | 1997 | 5 | 2 |
| Trinidad and Tobago | 1998 | 3 | 0 |
| Trinidad and Tobago | 1999 | 4 | 4 |
| Trinidad and Tobago | 2000 | 0 | 0 |
| Trinidad and Tobago | 2001 | 0 | 0 |
| Trinidad and Tobago | 2002 | 0 | 0 |
| Trinidad and Tobago | 2003 | 2 | 1 |
| Total | | 18 | 8 |

Scores and results list Trinidad and Tobago's goal tally first, score column indicates score after each Prosper goal.

List of international goals scored by Peter Prosper
| No. | Date | Venue | Opponent | Score | Result | Competition | Ref. |
|---|---|---|---|---|---|---|---|
| 1 | 17 February 1995 | Queen's Park Oval, Port of Spain, Trinidad and Tobago | Finland | ?–? | 2–2 | Friendly | |
| 2 | 13 July 1997 | Antigua Recreation Ground, St. John's, Antigua and Barbuda | Saint Kitts and Nevis | 3–0 | 4–0 | 1997 Caribbean Cup | |
| 3 | 13 July 1997 | Antigua Recreation Ground, St. John's, Antigua and Barbuda | Saint Kitts and Nevis | 4–0 | 4–0 | 1997 Caribbean Cup | |
| 4 | 5 June 1999 | Hasely Crawford Stadium, Port of Spain, Trinidad and Tobago | Grenada | 2–0 | 7–0 | 1999 Caribbean Cup | |
| 5 | 5 June 1999 | Hasely Crawford Stadium, Port of Spain, Trinidad and Tobago | Grenada | 3–0 | 7–0 | 1999 Caribbean Cup | |
| 6 | 5 June 1999 | Hasely Crawford Stadium, Port of Spain, Trinidad and Tobago | Grenada | 6–0 | 7–0 | 1999 Caribbean Cup | |
| 7 | 7 June 1999 | Hasely Crawford Stadium, Port of Spain, Trinidad and Tobago | Guadeloupe | 1–0 | 3–2 | 1999 Caribbean Cup | |
| 8 | 2 August 2003 | Warner Park, Basseterre, Saint Kitts and Nevis | Saint Kitts and Nevis | 2–0 | 2–1 | Friendly | |

== Honours ==
Ansar

- Lebanese Premier League: 1996–97, 1997–98, 1998–99
- Lebanese FA Cup: 2001–02

Mabarra

- Lebanese FA Cup: 2007–08

Individual

- Al Ansar FC Player of the Year: 1996–97
- Lebanese Premier League Best Player: 1998–99
- Lebanese Premier League Team of the Season: 1998–99
- Lebanese Premier League top scorer: 1996–97
