= Nasrat Al Jamal =

Lebanese footballer (born 1980)

Personal information
- Full name: Nasrat Zaki Al Jamal
- Date of birth: 1 July 1980 (age 46)
- Place of birth: Naqoura, Lebanon
- Height: 1.72 m (5 ft 8 in)
- Position: Attacking midfielder

Senior career*
Years	Team	Apps	(Gls)
1998–2004	Tadamon Sour		(17)
2004–2014	Ansar		(14)
2010–2011	→ Duhok (loan)		(4)
2014–2015	Chabab Ghazieh	13	(2)
2015–2016	Riyadi Abbasiyah		
2016–2018	Tadamon Sour	17	(2)
2020–2022	Okhwa Kharayeb		
2022–2024	Rissala Toura		(4)
Total			(43+)

International career
2002	Lebanon U23		(3)
1999–2009	Lebanon	42	(3)
- * Club domestic league appearances and goals

Nasrat Zaki Al Jamal (Arabic: نصرت زكي الجمل; born 1 July 1980) is a Lebanese former footballer who played as an attacking midfielder.

== Club career ==
Al Jamal began his career at Lebanese Premier League side Tadamon Sour during the 1998–99 season, with whom he stayed until the 2003–04 season. He helped his side win their first Lebanese FA Cup in 2000–01.

In 2004 Al Jamal joined Ansar; he suffered an injury in November 2004, having to undergo surgery. Despite his injury, Al Jamal scored two goals in the league during the 2004–05 season. The following two seasons (2005–06 and 2006–07), Al Jamal helped Ansar win two domestic doubles (league and cup) in a row, as well as another cup in 2009–10.

On 27 May 2010, Al Jamal moved to Iraqi side Duhok on a three-month loan; he helped the Iraqi side win the 2009–10 Iraqi Premier League. He stayed at Duhok for another season (2010–11), before returning to Ansar in 2011. During his second spell at Ansar, Al Jamal won a league title (2011–12) and a Lebanese Super Cup (2012).

In 2014 Al Jamal moved to Chabab Ghazieh, before joining Lebanese Third Division side Riyadi Abbasiyah on 14 January 2015. In 2016 he moved back to Tadamon Sour, where he retired in 2018. He came back from retirement in 2020, signing for Okhwa Kharayeb on 17 December in the Lebanese Third Division.

== International career ==
In 2002, Al Jamal played for the Lebanon Olympic team at the 2002 Asian Games, where he scored three goals.

Al Jamal had made his senior international debut for Lebanon in 1999, in a friendly against Malta; the match ended as a goalless draw. Al Jamal was part of Lebanon's 2000 AFC Asian Cup squad, but didn't play. His first international goal came on 9 September 2003, in a friendly against Bahrain. Al Jamal ended his international career with 42 caps and three goals.

== Career statistics ==
=== International ===
Scores and results list Lebanon's goal tally first, score column indicates score after each Al Jamal goal.

List of international goals scored by Nasrat Al Jamal
No.	Date	Venue	Opponent	Score	Result	Competition
1	19 September 2003	Bahrain National Stadium, Riffa, Bahrain	Bahrain	3–4	3–4	Friendly
2	8 February 2004	Camille Chamoun Sports City Stadium, Beirut, Lebanon	Bahrain	2–1	2–1	Friendly
3	10 October 2019	Rasmee Dhandu Stadium, Malé, Maldives	Maldives	2–1	2–1	2011 AFC Asian Cup qualification

== Honours ==
Tadamon Sour

- Lebanese FA Cup: 2000–01

Ansar

- Lebanese Premier League: 2005–06, 2006–07
- Lebanese FA Cup: 2005–06, 2006–07, 2009–10, 2011–12
- Lebanese Super Cup: 2012

Duhok

- Iraqi Premier League: 2009–10

Individual

- Lebanese Premier League Best Young Player: 1998–99
- Lebanese Premier League Team of the Season: 2001–02, 2004–05
