= Wahid El Fattal =

Lebanese footballer

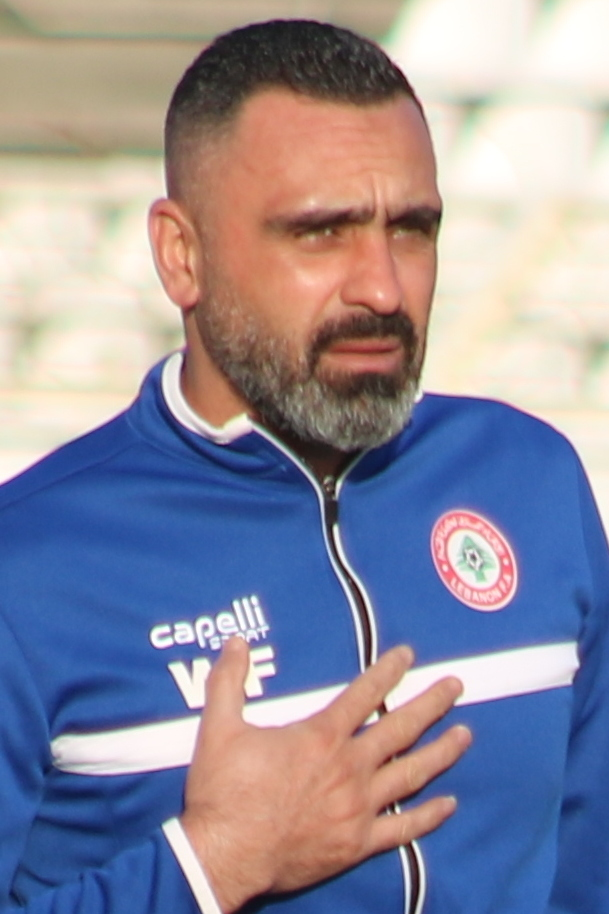
- El Fattal in 2021

Personal information
- Full name: Wahid Abdallah El Fattal
- Date of birth: 1 June 1978 (age 48)
- Place of birth: Beirut, Lebanon
- Height: 1.83 m (6 ft 0 in)
- Position: Goalkeeper

Team information
- Current team: Lebanon U20; Lebanon U23 (goalkeeper coach)

Youth career
- 1992–1998: Nejmeh

Senior career*
Years	Team	Apps	(Gls)
1998–2006	Nejmeh		
2006–2008	Ahli Saida		
2008–2010	Sagesse		
2010–2011	Ansar		
2011–2012	Shabab Sahel	0	(0)
2012–2014	Ahed	20	(0)

International career
1998–2004	Lebanon	11	(0)

Managerial career
- 2019–2023: Lebanon (goalkeeper)
- 2026–: Lebanon U20 (goalkeeper)
- 2026–: Lebanon U23 (goalkeeper)
- * Club domestic league appearances and goals

Wahid Abdallah El Fattal (Arabic: وحيد عبدالله الفتال; born 1 June 1978) is a Lebanese football coach and former player who is the goalkeeper coach of the Lebanon national under-20 and under-23 teams.

As a player, El Fattal represented Lebanon in the 2000 AFC Asian Cup. He also played for Nejmeh, Ahli Saida, Sagesse, Ansar, Shabab Sahel, and Ahed.

== Club career ==
El Fattal began his youth career at Nejmeh on 5 September 1992.

== Managerial career ==
El Fattal was announced goalkeeper coach of the Lebanon national team in 2019, under the tenure of Liviu Ciobotariu. In 2026, he was the goalkeeper coach of Lebanon U20. On 30 July 2026, he was appointed goalkeeper coach of Lebanon U23.

== Honours ==
Nejmeh

- Lebanese Premier League: 1999–2000, 2001–02, 2003–04, 2004–05

Individual

- Lebanese Premier League Team of the Season: 1998–99, 1999–2000
