= Hassan Hammoud =

Lebanese footballer (born 1986)

Personal information
- Full name: Hassan Ali Hammoud
- Date of birth: 26 September 1986 (age 40)
- Place of birth: Ghobeiry, Lebanon
- Height: 1.79 m (5 ft 10 in)
- Position: Midfielder

Senior career*
Years	Team	Apps	(Gls)
2005–2012	Mabarra		(3)
2012–2014	Ahed	25	(0)
2014–2018	Nabit Chit	20	(0)
Total		45+	(3)

International career
2013	Lebanon	1	(0)
- * Club domestic league appearances and goals

Hassan Ali Hammoud (Arabic: حسن علي حمود; born 26 September 1986) is a Lebanese former footballer who played as a midfielder.

== Club career ==
Hammoud moved to Nabi Chit from Ahed on 21 August 2014.

== Honours ==
Mabarra

- Lebanese FA Cup: 2007–08; runner-up: 2009–10

Ahed

- Lebanese Elite Cup: 2013; runner-up: 2012

Individual

- Lebanese Premier League Best Goal: 2009–10
