= Mohamad Halawi =

Lebanese footballer

Mohamad Halweh
Personal information
- Full name: Mohamad Nabih Halweh
- Date of birth: 5 April 1977 (age 49)
- Place of birth: Beirut, Lebanon
- Height: 1.90 m (6 ft 3 in)
- Position: Centre-back

Senior career*
Years	Team	Apps	(Gls)
1998–2007	Nejmeh		
2007–2009	Ahed		
2009–2012	Shabab Sahel		
2012–2013	Mabarra		

International career
1999–2007	Lebanon	32	(1)
- * Club domestic league appearances and goals

Mohamad Nabih Halawi (Arabic: محمد نبيه حلاوي; born 5 April 1977) is a Lebanese former footballer who played as a centre-back.

Halawi spent nine seasons with Nejmeh, before moving to Ahed in 2007. Two years later, he joined Shabab Al Sahel FC, before playing for Mabarra in the Lebanese Second Division during the 2012–13 season, where he retired. Halawi has been capped 22 times for the Lebanon national team, scoring one goal. He represented them at the 2000 AFC Asian Cup, which Lebanon hosted.

== Honours ==
Ahed

- Lebanese Super Cup: 2008

Individual

- Lebanese Premier League Team of the Season: 1999–2000, 2000–01, 2003–04, 2004–05, 2008–09
