= Chadi Karnib =

Lebanese footballer (born 1975)

Personal information
- Full name: Chadi Mosbah Karnib
- Date of birth: 1 January 1975 (age 51)
- Place of birth: Beirut, Lebanon
- Height: 1.70 m (5 ft 7 in)
- Position: Midfielder

Youth career
- Safa

Senior career*
Years	Team	Apps	(Gls)
1993–2000	Safa		
2000–2002	Sagesse		

International career
1996–1999	Lebanon	12	(1)
- * Club domestic league appearances and goals

Chadi Mosbah Karnib (Arabic: شادي مصباح كرنيب; born 1 January 1975) is a Lebanese former footballer who played as a midfielder. He played for the Lebanon national team during the 1990s and played most of his club career for Safa before later joining Sagesse.

== Club career ==
Karnib developed through the youth system of Safa and established himself in the club's first team during the 1990s. He was described as a skilful and technically accomplished midfielder and became one of Safa's prominent players during the latter part of the decade.

In March 1998, Karnib scored Safa's second goal in a 2–1 victory over Riyada Wal Adab. The following year, he played a decisive role in a 2–0 victory over Bourj, creating both goals and taking over on the right side in the absence of regular right-back Nabih Al Jurdi. He was described as the team's substitute captain and credited him with directing Safa's attacking play in the second half.

Karnib also scored in a 2–1 victory over Riyada Wal Adab in 1998, with the report noting his individual effort and left-footed finish. In October 1999, he returned from the bench against Salam Zgharta and supplied the assist for Walid Dahrouj's late winning goal.

Karnib briefly left Lebanon for Australia in pursuit of work. His departure generated interest from other Lebanese clubs, including a reported desire on his part to join Nejmeh, but he ultimately remained associated with Safa before later playing for Sagesse. Sagesse included Karnib among its local additions for the 2000–01 season.

== International career ==
Karnib was selected for the Lebanon national team setup during the 1990s. In April 1997, he was named among the 23 players selected for the newly assembled Future Lebanon team, which was intended to provide a pool of players for the national side. He played in the team's 2–1 victory over South Korea's youth side.

He was subsequently involved with the senior national team during the 1998 World Cup qualification campaign. In April 1997, he came on against Libya and immediately assisted Vardan Ghazaryan for Lebanon's second goal in a 2–0 victory. He was also part of the Lebanon team that finished third in the football tournament at the 1997 Arab Games, held in Beirut, with Lebanon winning the bronze medal after defeating Kuwait 3–1 in the third-place match.

== After football ==
Karnib ended his playing career at the age of 25 after suffering from chronic injuries. He subsequently settled in Australia, where he established a career outside professional football. He attempted to continue playing after his arrival but was unable to do so and later moved into coaching, working with a local Australian club. His decision to leave Lebanese football was also influenced by his dissatisfaction with the conditions faced by players. Around the time of his departure, Karnib publicly criticised the lack of player protections and called for either the establishment of a players' union or changes to the transfer and release system that would give players greater freedom in choosing their clubs.

In a 2017 interview, Karnib recalled his time at Safa and Sagesse and said that he had progressed through Safa's youth system before reaching the first team. He also attributed part of his decision to leave Lebanon to his dissatisfaction with the treatment and conditions of established players. The same interview noted that he remained involved in football in Australia through coaching and through his children, who also played the sport.

In March 2024, Karnib participated in a meeting involving the Lebanese Football Association and the Lebanese-Australian football community concerning ways of supporting the Lebanon national team and identifying players of Lebanese descent in Australia.

== Personal life ==
Karnib has three children, a son and two daughters, both of whom play football. His children, Abbas (b. 2003), Shereen (b. 2007), and Sara (b. 2010), all represented Lebanon internationally at youth level.

== Honours ==
Individual

- Lebanese Premier League Team of the Season: 1997–98, 1998–99
