= Gevorg Karapetyan (footballer, born 1963) =

Association football player and coach

Personal information
- Full name: Gevorg Zhorzhiki Karapetyan
- Date of birth: 15 December 1963 (age 62)
- Place of birth: Yerevan, Armenian SSR, Soviet Union
- Height: 1.81 m (5 ft 11 in)
- Positions: Defender; midfielder

Team information
- Current team: Ansar (assistant coach)

Youth career
- 1981–1984: Ararat Yerevan

Senior career*
Years	Team	Apps	(Gls)
1984–1986	Ararat Yerevan	49	(1)
1987	Kotayk	13	(0)
1990–1991	Spitak	55	(4)
1992–1993	Van Yerevan	47	(15)
1993–1997	Homenmen Beirut		
1997–2001	Ansar		
2001–2003	Homenetmen Beirut		

International career
1996–1999	Lebanon	41	(2)

Managerial career
- 2021–: Ansar (assistant)
- 2022: Ansar (interim)
- * Club domestic league appearances and goals

Gevorg Zhorzhiki Karapetyan (Armenian: Գևորգ Ժորժիկի Կարապետյան; Arabic: كيفورك قره بتيان; born 15 December 1963) is a professional football coach and former player who is the assistant coach of Lebanese Premier League club Ansar.

Born in Armenia, Karapetyan played as a defender or midfielder. He moved to Lebanon in 1993 and played for the Lebanon national team.

== Managerial career ==
On 22 March 2021, Karapetyan was announced assistant coach of Ansar. On 5 January 2022, following the resignation of Robert Jaspert, Karapetyan was appointed interim coach of Ansar, leading them in their 2–0 win against Safa four days later.

== Career statistics ==
=== International ===
Scores and results list Lebanon's goal tally first, score column indicates score after each Karapetyan goal.

List of international goals scored by Gevorg Karapetyan
No.	Date	Venue	Opponent	Score	Result	Competition	Ref.
1	3 October 1996	International Olympic Stadium, Tripoli, Lebanon	Bahrain	1–0	2–3	Friendly	
2	19 July 1997	Beirut Municipal Stadium, Beirut, Lebanon	Libya	2–1	2–1	1997 Pan Arab Games	

== Honours ==
=== Player ===
Homenmen Beirut

- Lebanese Second Division: 2002–03
- Lebanese FA Cup runner-up: 1993–94

Ansar

- Lebanese Premier League: 1997–98, 1998–99
- Lebanese FA Cup: 1998–99; runner-up: 2000–01
- Lebanese Elite Cup: 1997, 2000; runner-up: 1998
- Lebanese Federation Cup: 1999, 2000
- Lebanese Super Cup: 1997, 1998, 1999

Individual

- Lebanese Premier League Team of the Season: 1996–97, 1997–98, 1998–99

== See also ==
- List of Lebanon international footballers born outside Lebanon
