= Ahmad Sakr =

Lebanese footballer (born 1970)

Personal information
- Full name: Ahmad Ali Sakr
- Date of birth: 7 April 1970 (age 56)
- Place of birth: Hay Al Hara, Lebanon
- Position: Goalkeeper

Senior career*
Years	Team	Apps	(Gls)
1990–2001	Homenmen		
2001–2002	Tadamon Sour		
2002–2005	Olympic Beirut		
2005–2009	Nejmeh		
2009–2012	Mabarra		

International career
1993–2003	Lebanon	35	(0)
- * Club domestic league appearances and goals

Ahmad Ali Sakr (Arabic: أحمد علي صقر; born 7 April 1970) is a Lebanese former footballer who played as a goalkeeper. He is currently a football coach at Heritage College in Beirut, Lebanon.

== Club career ==
Sakr joined Nejmeh on 1 October 2005.

== International career ==
Sakr was the Lebanon national team's goalkeeper during the matches against Iran and Iraq at the 2000 AFC Asian Cup held in Lebanon. He played over 30 games for Lebanon between 1993 and 2003.

== Honours ==
Individual

- Lebanese Premier League Best Save: 1997–98, 1998–99, 2000–01
- Lebanese Premier League Team of the Season: 2005–06

== See also ==
- List of Lebanon international footballers
