= Wael Nazha =

Lebanese footballer (born 1974)

Personal information
- Date of birth: 26 March 1974 (age 52)
- Place of birth: Monrovia, Liberia
- Height: 1.84 m (6 ft 0 in)
- Position: Forward

Senior career*
| Years | Team | Apps | (Gls) |
| 1987–1989 | Racing Beirut | | |
| 1989–1998 | Tadamon Sour | | |
| 1998–1999 | Nejmeh | | (4) |
| 1999–2000 | Kavala | 10 | (0) |
| 2000–2001 | Emley | 6 | (0) |
| 2001 | Bradford (Park Avenue) | 10 | (3) |
| 2001–2002 | Ossett Town | 20 | (3) |
| 2002–2003 | Droylsden | 14 | (7) |
| 2003 | Wakefield | 6 | (0) |
| 2003–2004 | Eastwood Town | 37 | (32) |
| 2004–2005 | Frickley | 20 | (4) |
| Total | | ? | (119) |

International career
| 1993–1998 | Lebanon | 32 | (8) |
- * Club domestic league appearances and goals

Wael Nazha (Arabic: وائل نزهة; born 26 March 1974) is a former footballer who played as a forward. Born in Liberia, he played for the Lebanon national team.

== Early life ==
Nazha was born in Monrovia, Liberia, to a Lebanese father and a Liberian mother.

== Club career ==
Nazha began playing football in Liberia; he continued his football career in Nabi Osman in Lebanon, then joined Labweh's local club in Baalbek. In 1987, Nazha joined Racing Beirut, then moved to Tadamon Sour in 1989. He eventually joined Beirut-based side Nejmeh.

Nazha spent one season playing for Kavala in the Greek Alpha Ethniki. He finished his career in the lower levels of English football, playing for Emley, Bradford (Park Avenue), Ossett Town, Droylsden, Wakefield, and Frickley.

== International career ==
Nazha has made at least 45 appearances—official and unofficial—for the Lebanon national team, and has scored eight official goals between 1993 and 1998.

== Career statistics ==
=== International ===
Scores and results list Lebanon's goal tally first, score column indicates score after each Nazha goal.

List of international goals scored by Wael Nazha
| No. | Date | Venue | Opponent | Score | Result | Competition | Ref. |
|---|---|---|---|---|---|---|---|
| 1 | 26 March 1993 | Beirut, Lebanon | Jordan | 1–0 | 1–0 | Friendly | |
| 2 | 9 June 1993 | Seoul, South Korea | Hong Kong | 2–1 | 2–1 | 1994 FIFA World Cup qualification | |
| 3 | 12 May 1996 | Bourj Hammoud Stadium, Beirut, Lebanon | Turkmenistan | 1–1 | 3–1 | 1996 AFC Asian Cup qualification | |
| 4 | 9 June 1996 | Beirut, Lebanon | Kuwait | 1–0 | 3–5 | 1996 AFC Asian Cup qualification | |
| 5 | 12 January 1997 | Bourj Hammoud Stadium, Beirut, Lebanon | Algeria | 2–1 | 2–2 | Friendly | |
| 6 | 26 January 1997 | Beirut Municipal Stadium, Beirut, Lebanon | Estonia | 2–0 | 2–0 | Friendly | |
| 7 | 13 April 1997 | Bourj Hammoud Stadium, Beirut, Lebanon | Singapore | 1–0 | 1–1 | 1998 FIFA World Cup qualification | |

== Honours ==
Nejmeh

- Lebanese Elite Cup: 1998

Bradford Park Avenue

- Northern Premier League First Division: 2000–01

Eastwood Town

- Nottinghamshire Senior Cup: 2003–04
- Northern Counties East Football League President's Cup: 2003–04

Individual

- IFFHS All-time Lebanon Men's Dream Team
- Lebanese Premier League Team of the Season: 1996–97, 1997–98

== See also ==
- List of Lebanon international footballers born outside Lebanon
