= Hassan Bittar =

Lebanese footballer (born 1985)

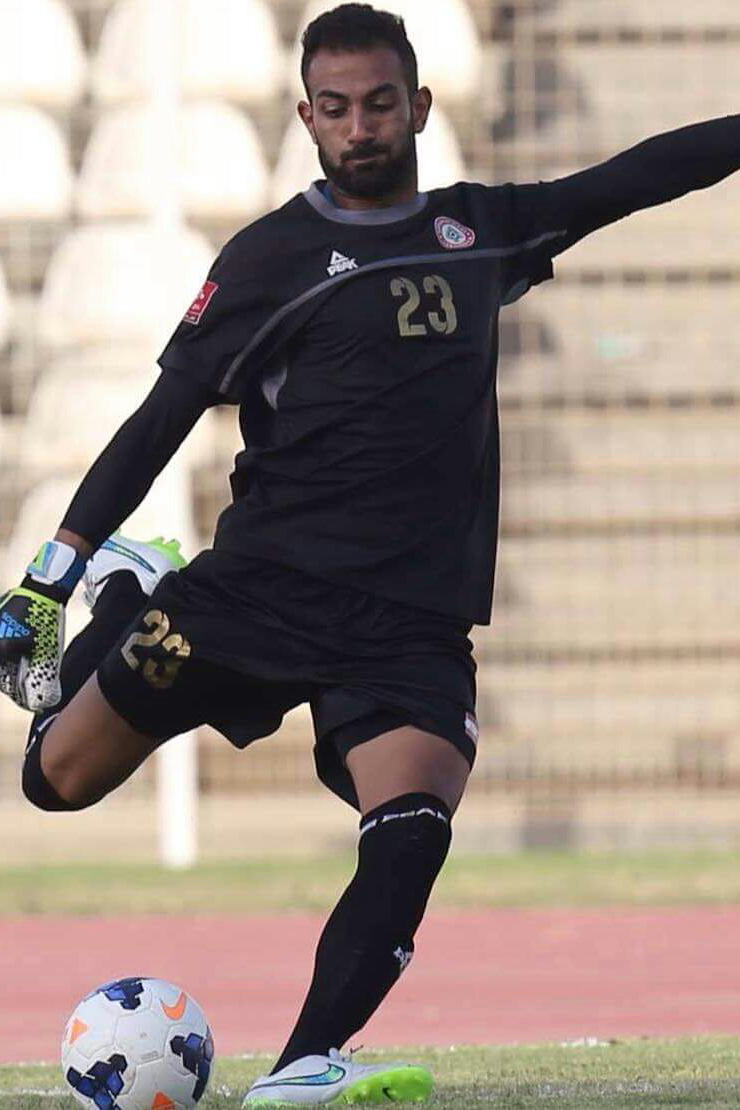
- Bittar with Lebanon in 2015

Personal information
- Full name: Hassan Ibrahim Bittar
- Date of birth: 24 May 1985 (age 41)
- Place of birth: Tyre, Lebanon
- Height: 1.89 m (6 ft 2 in)
- Position: Goalkeeper

Senior career*
Years	Team	Apps	(Gls)
2002–2007	Tadamon Sour		
2007–2011	Mabarra		
2014–2017	Ahed	15	(0)

International career
2003–2004	Lebanon U20	5	(0)
2005–2008	Lebanon U23	12	(0)
2008–2016	Lebanon	7	(0)
- * Club domestic league appearances and goals

Hassan Ibrahim Bittar (Arabic: حَسَن إِبْرَاهِيم بَيْطَار; born 24 May 1985) is a Lebanese former professional footballer who played as a goalkeeper.

Starting his senior career at Lebanese Premier League side Tadamon Sour in 2002, Bittar moved to Mabarra in 2007, where he helped his club lift their first ever Lebanese FA Cup (2007–08). In 2014 Bittar moved to Ahed, where he won two league titles, a Lebanese Elite Cup, and a Lebanese Super Cup. He retired from football in 2017.

Bittar represented Lebanon internationally between 2008 and 2016, playing seven international games for his country.

== Club career ==
Bittar began his senior career at Lebanese Premier League club Tadamon Sour, in 2002–03. The Lebanese goalkeeper remained at Tadamon for five seasons, before moving to Mabarra in 2007. In his first season at the club, Bittar helped Mabarra lift their first Lebanese FA Cup (2007–08).

Following five seasons at Mabarra, Bittar moved to Ahed in 2014. In his first season at the club, Bittar lifted a league title in 2014–15. The following season, Bittar won a Lebanese Elite Cup (2015) and a Lebanese Super Cup (2015). In his final season at the club (2016–17), Bittar won a second league title. The Lebanese goalkeeper retired with two league titles, an FA Cup, an Elite Cup, and a Super Cup.

== International career ==
Bittar made his international senior debut for Lebanon on 2 January 2008, in a friendly against Kuwait; Lebanon lost 3–2. Bittar's first clean sheet came on 30 May 2015, in a friendly against Jordan. Bittar played seven international matches for Lebanon, between 2008 and his last international match in 2016.

== Honours ==
Mabarra

- Lebanese FA Cup: 2007–08

Ahed

- Lebanese Premier League: 2014–15, 2016–17
- Lebanese Elite Cup: 2015
- Lebanese Super Cup: 2015

Individual

- Lebanese Premier League Team of the Season: 2007–08
