= Mohamad Hammoud (footballer, born 1980) =

Lebanese footballer (born 1980)

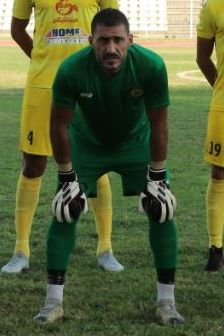
- Hammoud with Bourj in 2020

Personal information
- Full name: Mohamad Hassan Hammoud
- Date of birth: 20 April 1980 (age 46)
- Place of birth: Beirut, Lebanon
- Height: 1.88 m (6 ft 2 in)
- Position: Goalkeeper

Team information
- Current team: Ahed (goalkeeper coach)

Youth career
- Ahed

Senior career*
Years	Team	Apps	(Gls)
2003–2012	Ahed		
2012–2014	Nejmeh	15+	(0)
2014–2020	Ahed	55	(0)
2020–2021	Bourj	1	(0)
2021–2023	Ahed	1	(0)

International career
2011–2012	Lebanon	4	(0)

Managerial career
- 2021–: Ahed (goalkeeper)
- * Club domestic league appearances and goals

Mohamad Hassan Hammoud (Arabic: محمد حسن حمود; born 20 April 1980) is a Lebanese football coach and former player who is the goalkeeper coach of Ahed.

== Club career ==
Coming through the youth system, Hammoud began his senior career at Ahed. He was named Lebanese Premier League Best Goalkeeper in 2006–07. Hammoud joined Nejmeh in September 2012, with whom he won the 2013–14 league title. He returned to Ahed in September 2014.

On 28 June 2020, Hammoud joined Bourj on a two-year contract from Ahed. On 7 October 2020, Bourj decided to suspend Hammoud indefinitely from the squad, due to an altercation with the team's goalkeeper coach. Bourj fans criticized Hammoud for seemingly throwing the game in their 3–2 defeat to Ahed.

Hammoud returned to Ahed ahead of the 2021–22 season. On 20 April 2022, Hammoud played his only game of the 2021–22 season for Ahed on his 42nd birthday, captaining his side in a 3–0 win against Shabab Sahel.

== Managerial career ==
On 8 July 2021, Hammoud was appointed goalkeeper coach of Ahed's youth setup.

== Honours ==
Ahed

- AFC Cup: 2019
- Lebanese Premier League: 2007–08, 2009–10, 2010–11, 2014–15, 2016–17, 2017–18, 2018–19, 2021–22
- Lebanese FA Cup: 2008–09, 2010–11, 2017–18, 2018–19
- Lebanese Elite Cup: 2008, 2010, 2011, 2013, 2015
- Lebanese Super Cup: 2008, 2010, 2011, 2015, 2017, 2018, 2019

Nejmeh

- Lebanese Premier League: 2013–14

Individual

- Lebanese Premier League Team of the Season: 2009–10, 2010–11, 2013–14, 2014–15
- Lebanese Premier League Best Goalkeeper: 2006–07
