= Nabil Baalbaki =

Lebanese footballer

Personal information
- Full name: Nabil Ali Baalbaki
- Date of birth: 27 May 1978 (age 48)
- Place of birth: Beirut, Lebanon
- Height: 1.76 m (5 ft 9 in)
- Position: Defensive midfielder

Team information
- Current team: Lebanon U20 (assistant coach)

Senior career*
Years	Team	Apps	(Gls)
2000–2002	Tadamon Sour		(1)
2002–2005	Olympic Beirut		(0)
2005–2011	Ansar		(1)
2011–2013	Akhaa Ahli	37	(1)
2013–2015	Ansar	33	(0)
Total		70+	(3+)

International career
2003–2007	Lebanon	13	(0)

Managerial career
- 2018–2021: Ansar (assistant)
- 2021–2026: Safa (youth)
- 2026–: Lebanon U20 (assistant)
- * Club domestic league appearances and goals

Nabil Ali Baalbaki (Arabic: نبيل علي بعلبكي; born 27 May 1978) is a Lebanese football coach and former player who is the assistant coach of the Lebanon national under-20 team. He played as a defensive midfielder for the Lebanon national team.

== Club career ==
Baalbaki began his senior career at Lebanese Premier League side Tadamon Sour, during the 2000–01 season. In his first season at the club, Baalbaki helped his side lift their first Lebanese FA Cup. After two seasons, in 2002 Baalbaki moved to Olympic Beirut. He won a domestic double with the club in his first season, winning both the 2002–03 Lebanese Premier League and the 2002–03 Lebanese FA Cup.

The Lebanese midfielder remained at Olympic Beirut for three seasons, before moving to Ansar 8 September 2005. Once again Baalbaki won in his first season at his new club, helping his side lift a domestic double in 2005–06. The following season, Baalbaki won another domestic double, winning both the league and cup in the 2006–07 season. Baalbaki remained with Ansar for six seasons, where he also won another FA Cup (2009–10). In the 2009–10 season, Baalbaki was also included in the Lebanese Premier League Team of the Season.

In 2011 Akhaa Ahli Aley bought Baalbaki from Ansar; the player stayed two seasons at Akhaa, before returning to Ansar on 16 September 2013. Baalbaki retired after two seasons, in 2015, having won a total of three league titles and five FA Cups in his career.

== International career ==
Baalbaki made his international senior debut for Lebanon on 19 September 2003, in a friendly against Bahrain; Lebanon lost 4–3. The midfielder played 13 games for Lebanon, between 2003 and 2007.

== Managerial career ==
Baalbaki was appointed assistant coach of Ansar ahead of the 2018–19 Lebanese Premier League. On 1 September 2019, Baalbaki resigned from his position due to internal problems, but returned on 27 September. He moved to train Safa youth teams in October 2021. In 2026, he was the assistant coach of the Lebanon national under-20 team.

== Honours ==
Tadamon Sour

- Lebanese FA Cup: 2000–01

Olympic Beirut

- Lebanese Premier League: 2002–03
- Lebanese FA Cup: 2002–03

Ansar

- Lebanese Premier League: 2005–06, 2006–07
- Lebanese FA Cup: 2005–06, 2006–07, 2009–10

Individual

- Lebanese Premier League Team of the Season: 2002–03, 2005–06, 2006–07, 2007–08, 2009–10
