= Malek Hassoun =

Lebanese footballer (born 1975)

Personal information
- Full name: Malek Ibrahim Hassoun
- Date of birth: 10 June 1975 (age 51)
- Place of birth: Ghazieh, Lebanon
- Height: 1.78 m (5 ft 10 in)
- Position: Midfielder

Team information
- Current team: Tripoli (head coach)

Youth career
- 1988–1993: Chabab Ghazieh

Senior career*
Years	Team	Apps	(Gls)
1993–1997	Chabab Ghazieh		
1997–2009	Ansar		(17)

International career
1997–2004	Lebanon	12	(2)

Managerial career
- 2009–2013: Ansar (assistant)
- 2013–2014: Ansar
- 2014–2015: Chabab Ghazieh
- 2015–2016: Ansar (assistant)
- 2016–2017: Shabab Sahel
- 2018: Shabab Arabi
- 2018–2019: Shabab Bourj
- 2019–2021: Ahli Saida
- 2021–2022: Ahli Saida
- 2022: Safa
- 2022–2024: Tadamon Sour
- 2024: Bourj
- 2024–2025: Ahly Nabatieh
- 2025–2026: Mabarra
- 2026–: Tripoli
- * Club domestic league appearances and goals

Malek Ibrahim Hassoun (Arabic: مالك ابراهيم حسون; born 10 June 1975) is a Lebanese football manager and former player who is the head coach of Lebanese Premier League club Tripoli.

As a player, he played as a midfielder for Chabab Ghazieh, Ansar, and the Lebanon national team.

== Club career ==
Hassoun began his career at hometown club Chabab Ghazieh aged 13, joining Ansar on 5 May 1997. He became captain in 2002 following Jamal Taha's retirement, and played the rest of his career there, retiring in 2009. Hassoun played over 400 games in all competitions, scoring around 45 goals.

== International career ==
Hassoun represented the Lebanon national team between 1997 and 2004, scoring twice in 12 games.

== Managerial career ==
Hassoun began his managerial career as assistant coach of Lebanese Premier League side Ansar in 2009, under coach Jamal Taha. Following Taha's dismissal, he was appointed head coach on 7 April 2013, remaining until 30 April 2014.

Hassoun became head coach of Chabab Ghazieh in the Lebanese Premier League in November 2014; after avoiding relegation to the Lebanese Second Division, his contract was renewed for a further year on 28 May 2015. He resigned on 26 November 2015, after only gaining one point in the opening five matches of the 2015–16 season.

In December 2015, Hassoun returned to Ansar as assistant coach to Jamal Taha. Both Hassoun and Taha submitted their resignation on 11 September 2016, following Ansar's 5–2 defeat to Salam Zgharta in the first round of the 2016–17 season.

On 10 October 2016, Hassoun was appointed head coach of Shabab Sahel. He became coach of Second Division side Shabab Arabi on 3 February 2018, resigning only one month later on 5 March citing administrative reasons. Hassoun was appointed head coach of Shabab Bourj in the Second Division ahead of the 2018–19 season. He helped them gain promotion to the Lebanese Premier League for the first time.

Ahead of the 2019–20 Lebanese Second Division, Hassoun was appointed head coach of Ahli Saida. He remained in charge until 2021. On 24 June 2022, Hassoun became head coach of Lebanese Premier League side Tadamon Sour. He resigned in 2024, and was appointed head coach of Bourj. In summer 2024, he was appointed head coach of Ahly Nabatieh.

On 1 August 2025, Hassoun was appointed head coach of newly promoted Lebanese Premier League club Mabarra. He was appointed head coach of newly promoted Lebanese Premier League club Tripoli in August 2026.

== Style of play ==
Hassoun was known for his free kicks, with over 80% of his goals coming from free kicks. He was also known for his accurate passing.

== Honours ==
=== Player ===
Ansar

- Lebanese Premier League: 1997–98, 1998–99, 2005–06, 2006–07
- Lebanese FA Cup: 1998–99, 2001–02, 2005–06, 2006–07, 2009–10
- Lebanese Elite Cup: 1997, 2000
- Lebanese Federation Cup: 1999, 2000
- Lebanese Super Cup: 1997, 1998, 1999

Individual

- Lebanese Premier League Best Goal: 1997–98
- Lebanese Premier League Team of the Season: 1997–98
