= Imad Al Miri =

Lebanese footballer

Personal information
- Full name: Imad Ghazi Al Miri
- Date of birth: 9 October 1977 (age 49)
- Place of birth: Beirut, Lebanon
- Height: 1.73 m (5 ft 8 in)
- Positions: Full-back; midfielder

Team information
- Current team: Racing Beirut (head coach)

Senior career*
Years	Team	Apps	(Gls)
1999–2000	Shabab Sahel		(0)
2000–2002	Tadamon Sour		(3)
2002–2004	Olympic Beirut		(0)
2004–2008	Ansar		(5)
2008–2011	Racing Beirut		(11)
2011–2012	Safa	20	(1)
2012–2015	Shabab Sahel	37	(4)
2015–2016	Safa	1	(0)
2016–2018	Shabab Arabi		
2018–2019	Ahli Saida		
2019–2020	Racing Beirut		

International career
1999–2011	Lebanon	7	(0)

Managerial career
- 2021: Ahli Saida
- 2021–2022: Ahli Saida (assistant)
- 2022: Ahli Saida
- 2022: Ahli Saida (assistant)
- 2022–2023: Nahda Barelias
- 2023–2025: Nahda Barelias
- 2025: Taqadom Anqoun
- 2026–: Racing Beirut
- * Club domestic league appearances and goals

Imad Ghazi Al Miri (Arabic: عماد غادي الميري; born 10 September 1977) is a Lebanese football coach and former player who is the head coach of Lebanese Second Division club Racing Beirut. As a player, he played as a full-back or midfielder.

== Club career ==
In September 2000, he joined Tadamon Sour from Shabab Sahel after being exchanged for Ghassan Choueikh. On 13 September 2004, Al Miri moved to Ansar from Olympic Beirut. He retired on 30 September 2020.

== Managerial career ==
On 5 August 2021, Al Miri was appointed head coach of Ahli Saida. He became head coach of Nahda Barelias in 2022.

== Honours ==
=== Player ===
Shabab Sahel

- Lebanese FA Cup: 1999–2000; runner-up: 2012–13
- Lebanese Challenge Cup: 2014

Tadamon Sour

- Lebanese FA Cup: 2000–01

Olympic Beirut

- Lebanese Premier League: 2002–03
- Lebanese FA Cup: 2002–03

Ansar

- Lebanese Premier League: 2005–06, 2006–07
- Lebanese FA Cup: 2005–06, 2006–07
- Lebanese Elite Cup runner-up: 2005

Safa

- Lebanese Premier League: 2011–12, 2015–16
- Lebanese Elite Cup runner-up: 2011, 2015
- Lebanese Super Cup runner-up: 2011

Shabab Arabi

- Lebanese Second Division: 2016–17

Individual

- Lebanese Premier League Team of the Season: 2001–02, 2004–05, 2009–10, 2010–11
