= Bilal El Najjarine =

Lebanese footballer (born 1981)

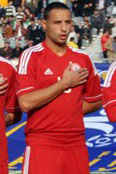
- El Najjarine with Lebanon in 2013

Personal information
- Full name: Bilal Mohamad Saada Cheikh El Najjarine
- Date of birth: 8 February 1981 (age 45)
- Place of birth: Haddadin, Tripoli, Lebanon
- Height: 1.87 m (6 ft 2 in)
- Position: Centre-back

Senior career*
| Years | Team | Apps | (Gls) |
| 2003–2011 | Nejmeh | | |
| 2011 | Bankstown City Lions | 3 | (0) |
| 2011–2012 | Nejmeh | 17 | (6) |
| 2012–2013 | Churchill Brothers | 15 | (1) |
| 2013 | Dibba Al-Fujairah | 11 | (1) |
| 2013–2015 | Al Dhafra | 46 | (1) |
| 2015–2016 | Dibba Al-Fujairah | 17 | (0) |
| 2016 | Nejmeh | 2 | (0) |

International career
| 2004–2015 | Lebanon | 53 | (1) |
- * Club domestic league appearances and goals

Bilal Mohamad Saada Cheikh El Najjarine (Arabic: بلال محمد سادة شيخ النجارين; born 8 February 1981), or simply Bilal El Najjarine, is a Lebanese former professional footballer who played as a centre-back.

At club level he most notably played for Nejmeh, also playing in Australia, India, and the United Arab Emirates. He represented Lebanon internationally between 2004 and 2015.

== Club career ==
El Najjarine joined Nejmeh on 18 August 2003. After eight years, he moved to NSW Premier League side Bankstown City Lions in June 2011, making his debut on 19 June in a 1–0 win over Rockdale City Suns. He played three league games in total.

In 2012, El Najjarine moved to Indian I-League side Churchill Brothers on a one-year contract. He made his debut on 6 October 2012, in their 2–0 defeat to Dempo. He appeared in fifteen league matches and scored a goal during the 2012–13 I-League season, as the club clinched its second league title under the guidance of manager Mariano Dias.

== Career statistics ==
=== International ===
Scores and results list Lebanon's goal tally first, score column indicates score after each El Najjarine goal.

List of international goals scored by Bilal El Najjarine
| No. | Date | Venue | Opponent | Score | Result | Competition | Ref. |
|---|---|---|---|---|---|---|---|
| 1 | 9 September 2013 | Jassim bin Hamad Stadium, Doha, Qatar | Qatar | 0–1 | 1–1 | Friendly | |

== Honours ==
Nejmeh

- Lebanese Premier League: 2001–02, 2003–04, 2004–05, 2008–09
- Lebanese FA Cup: 2015–16; runner-up: 2002–03, 2003–04, 2011–12
- Lebanese Elite Cup: 2001, 2002, 2003, 2004, 2005, 2016
- Lebanese Super Cup: 2002, 2004, 2009, 2016
- AFC Cup runner-up: 2005

Churchill Brothers

- I-League: 2012–13

Individual

- Lebanese Premier League Best Player: 2011–12
- Lebanese Premier League Team of the Season: 2008–09, 2009–10, 2011–12

== See also ==
- List of Lebanon international footballers
