= Hussein Daher =

Lebanese footballer (born 1977)

Personal information
- Full name: Hussein Khalil Daher
- Date of birth: 15 March 1977 (age 49)
- Position: Defender

Youth career
- 1994–2000: Nejmeh

Senior career*
Years	Team	Apps	(Gls)
2000–2008	Nejmeh		
2008–2010	Khoyol		

International career
2000	Lebanon	9	(0)
- * Club domestic league appearances and goals

Hussein Khalil Daher (Arabic: حسين خليل ضاهر; born 15 March 1977) is a Lebanese former footballer who played as a defender.

== Club career ==
Daher joined Nejmeh's youth sector on 14 January 1994. He joined Lebanese Second Division side Khoyol in 2008.

== Personal life ==
Around 2008, Daher immigrated to Sweden with his family. His son, Ali Zaher, also plays football.

== Honours ==
Individual

- Lebanese Premier League Team of the Season: 1999–2000, 2003–04
