= Nabih Al Jurdi =

Lebanese footballer (born 1967)

Personal information
- Date of birth: 9 May 1967 (age 59)
- Height: 1.72 m (5 ft 8 in)
- Position: Right-back

Youth career
- Safa

Senior career*
Years	Team	Apps	(Gls)
1986–2001	Safa		
2001–2003	Racing Beirut		
2003–2005	Mabarra		

International career
1988–1999	Lebanon	24	(1)
- * Club domestic league appearances and goals

Nabih Al Jurdi (Arabic: نبيه الجردي; born 9 May 1967) is a Lebanese former footballer who played as a right-back.

== Club career ==
Coming through the youth system, Al Jurdi began his career at local club Safa during the Lebanese Civil War; he made his debut in 1986.

== International career ==
Al Jurdi first joined the Lebanon national team in 1987, playing against Syria in a 1988 Arab Cup qualifying game. He scored one international goal, against Kazakhstan at the 1998 Asian Games. Al Jurdi played 45 international games for Lebanon.

== Career statistics ==
Scores and results list Lebanon's goal tally first, score column indicates score after each Al Jurdi goal.

List of international goals scored by Nabih Al Jurdi
No.	Date	Venue	Opponent	Score	Result	Competition
1	12 December 1998	Rajamangala Stadium, Bangkok, Thailand	Kazakhstan	3–0	3–0	1998 Asian Games

== Honours ==
Individual

- Lebanese Premier League Team of the Season: 1996–97, 1997–98, 1998–99
