= Ali Attar =

Lebanese footballer (born 1980)

Personal information
- Full name: Ali Asaad Attar
- Date of birth: 15 May 1980 (age 46)
- Place of birth: Chaat, Lebanon
- Positions: Midfielder; full-back

Senior career*
Years	Team	Apps	(Gls)
2001–2009	Ahed		
2009–2011	Mabarra		

International career
2004	Lebanon	12	(0)
- * Club domestic league appearances and goals

Ali Asaad Attar (Arabic: علي أسعد العطار; born 15 May 1980) is a Lebanese former footballer who played as a midfielder or full-back.

== Club career ==
Attar played in the Lebanese Premier League for Ahed and Mabarra. He was included in the Team of the Season in the 2002–03 and 2003–04 seasons.

== Honours ==
Individual

- Lebanese Premier League Team of the Season: 2002–03, 2003–04
