= Khaled Hamieh =

Lebanese footballer, singer and DJ

Personal information
- Full name: Khaled Ali Hamieh
- Date of birth: 7 June 1981 (age 45)
- Place of birth: Taraya, Lebanon
- Height: 1.77 m (5 ft 10 in)
- Position: Full-back

Youth career
- 1997–1998: Nejmeh

Senior career*
Years	Team	Apps	(Gls)
1998–2014	Nejmeh		

International career
2003–2009	Lebanon	34	(2)
- * Club domestic league appearances and goals

Khaled Ali Hamieh (Arabic: خالد علي حميه; born 7 June 1981) is a Lebanese singer, DJ, and former footballer.

Throughout his career, he played for Nejmeh as a defender, and has been capped 34 times for the Lebanon national team, scoring twice. Following his retirement from football, Hamieh became a singer and DJ.

== Football career ==
=== Club ===
Hamieh signed for Lebanese Premier League side Nejmeh's youth sector on 19 February 1997. He played for the senior team between 1998 and 2014.

=== International ===
Hamieh scored his first international goal for Lebanon in a 1–1 home draw against North Korea during a 2004 AFC Asian Cup qualification match on 3 November 2003.

== Music career ==
Following his retirement from football, Hamieh pursued a career in the music industry, working as a singer and DJ.

== Career statistics ==
=== International ===
Scores and results list Lebanon's goal tally first.

#	Date	Venue	Opponent	Score	Result	Competition
1.	3 November 2003	Beirut	North Korea	1–0	1–1	2004 AFC Asian Cup qualification
2.	31 March 2004	Nam Dinh	Vietnam	2–0	1–0	2006 FIFA World Cup qualification

== Honours ==
Individual

- Lebanese Premier League Team of the Season: 2002–03, 2003–04, 2005–06
