= 2011 Lebanese Elite Cup =

Lebanese Elite Cup
- Season: 2011
- Champions: Al Ahed
- Matches: 9
- Goals: 36 (4 per match)

The 2011 Lebanese Elite Cup was the 14th edition of this football tournament in Lebanon. It was held from 10 to 24 September 2011. This tournament included the six best teams from the 2010–11 Lebanese Premier League season.

== Teams ==
Club	City	2010–2011 season
Al Ahed	Beirut	Lebanese Premier League Champions
Safa Sporting Club	Beirut	2nd in Lebanese Premier League
Nejmeh	Beirut	3rd in Lebanese Premier League
Al Ansar	Beirut	4th in Lebanese Premier League
Al Mabarrah	Beirut	5th in Lebanese Premier League
Racing Beirut	Beirut	6th in Lebanese Premier League

== Group stage ==
=== Group A ===
Team	Pld	W	D	L	GF	GA	GD	Pts
(Lebanon) Al Ahed	2	2	0	0	4	2	+2	6
(Lebanon) Racing Beirut	2	1	0	1	1	1	0	3
(Lebanon) Nejmeh	2	0	0	2	2	4	-2	0

10 September 2011
16:30

Al Ahed	1 – 0	Racing Beirut
Maatouk 37' (pen.)

Bourj Hammoud Stadium, Beirut

13 September 2011
16:30

Nejmeh	2 – 3	Al Ahed
Moghrabi 65'; Atwi 71'		Keenan 38'; Faour 57'; Dakik 90+4'

Camille Chamoun Sports City Stadium, Beirut

16 September 2011
16:30

Nejmeh	0 – 1	Racing Beirut
		Swaidan 32'

Camille Chamoun Sports City Stadium, Beirut

=== Group B ===
Team	Pld	W	D	L	GF	GA	GD	Pts
(Lebanon) Safa Sporting Club	2	2	0	0	6	4	+2	6
(Lebanon) Al-Mabarrah	2	0	1	1	4	5	-1	1
(Lebanon) Al Ansar	2	0	1	1	4	5	-1	1

11 September 2011
16:30

Safa	3 – 2	Al Ansar
Salameh 25'; Tahan 35'; Khayereddine 90+4'		Jawad 5'; El Jounaidi 71'

Camille Chamoun Sports City Stadium, Beirut

14 September 2011
16:30

Safa	3 – 2	Al-Mabarrah
Atwi 33'; Owayda 74'; Salameh 90'		T.Al Ali 69'; Safwan 89'

Bourj Hammoud Stadium, Beirut

17 September 2011
16:30

Al Ansar	2 – 2	Al-Mabarrah
Chouman 11'; Atwi 82'		Al Ali 18', 73'

Bourj Hammoud Stadium, Beirut

* A toss was made between Al Ansar and Al-Mabarrah to determine the winner in which Al-Mabarrah won and qualified for semifinal.

== Final Stage ==
Semi-finals
20 September - Beirut
Al Ahed	4
Al Mabarrah	1
21 September - Beirut
Safa	4
Racing Beirut	0

Final
24 September - Beirut
Al Ahed	4
Safa	2

=== Semi finals ===
20 September
16:30

Al Ahed	7 – 1	Al Mabarrah
Maatouk 7' (pen.); Chaito 14', 30'; El Ali 47', 86'; Atwi 88' (pen.), 90'	Report	Ammar 20'

Camille Chamoun Sports City Stadium, Beirut
Referee: Andre Haddad

21 September
16:30

Safa	4 – 0	Racing Beirut

Bourj Hammoud Stadium, Beirut

=== Final ===
24 September
16:30

Al Ahed	4 – 2	Safa
Chaito 19', 82', 90+2'; Maatouk 46'	Report	Salame 69'; Atwi 84'

Camille Chamoun Sports City Stadium, Beirut
