= Rabih Osman =

Lebanese football player and coach

Personal information
- Full name: Rabih Mohammad Osman
- Date of birth: 1 July 1975 (age 51)
- Place of birth: Qoubbeh, Tripoli, Lebanon
- Height: 1.76 m (5 ft 9 in)
- Position: Striker

Senior career*
Years	Team	Apps	(Gls)
–1999	Harakat Shabab		
1999–2002	Salam Zgharta		(28)
2002–2007	Tripoli (Note: Olympic Beirut changed their name to Tripoli in 2005.)		
2007–2009	Egtmaaey		
2009–2011	Salam Zgharta		

International career
1999–2002	Lebanon	13	(0)

Managerial career
- –2020: Majd Tripoli
- 2020–: Riada Wal Adab
- * Club domestic league appearances and goals

Rabih Mohammad Osman (Arabic: ربيع محمد عثمان; born 1 July 1975) is a Lebanese football coach and former player who is the head coach of Lebanese Fourth Division club Riada Wal Adab.

== Club career ==
Osman began his career at Harakat Shabab, before joining Salam Zgharta in 1999. Following his third season at the club, he received offers from German clubs Hamburger SV and 1860 Munich; however, Salam were only willing to sell Osman for a large sum, and the transfers fell through.

In 2002, Osman moved to Olympic Beirut for a then-national record sum of $30,000; he remained at the club when they changed their name to Tripoli. Between 2007 and 2009, Osman played for cross-city rivals Egtmaaey; he joined Salam Zgharta in 2009, with whom he played until 2011.

== International career ==
Osman's performances with Salam Zgharta in 1999 caught the attention of the Lebanon national team coach, who called him up for friendly games in preparation for the 2000 AFC Asian Cup.

== Managerial career ==
Osman coached Majd Tripoli, before taking the helm of Lebanese Third Division team Riada Wal Adab in September 2020. He was also coach of youth club Stadium Academy Football (SAF).

== Personal life ==
In January 2014, Osman was injured by a gunshot wound to the leg due to a traffic-related altercation.

== Honours ==
Individual

- Lebanese Premier League Team of the Season: 1999–2000
