= Ali Mteirek =

Lebanese footballer

- Mteirek with Lebanon in 2006

Personal information
- Full name: Ali Ahmad Mteirek
- Date of birth: 15 January 1978
- Place of birth: Tahouitet En Nahr, Lebanon
- Date of death: 24 July 2014 (aged 36)
- Place of death: Beirut, Lebanon
- Position: Centre-back

Senior career*
Years	Team	Apps	(Gls)
1997–1998	Bourj		
1998–2002	Tadamon Sour		
2002–2005	Olympic Beirut		
2005–2007	Ansar		
2007–2010	Ahed		
2010–2013	Shabab Sahel		
2013–2014	Khoyol		
2014	Sagesse		

International career
1998–2006	Lebanon	17	(0)
- * Club domestic league appearances and goals

Ali Ahmad Mteirek (Arabic: علي أحمد متيرك; 15 January 1978 – 24 July 2014) was a Lebanese footballer who played as a centre-back. He represented the Lebanon national team between 1998 and 2006.

== Club career ==
Born in Tahouitet En Nahr, Lebanon, Mteirek grew up in Bourj el-Barajneh suburb of Beirut.

Mteirek began his senior career at Bourj, before moving to Tadamon Sour, with whom he won the Lebanese FA Cup in 2001. He joined Olympic Beirut in 2002, winning the domestic double (league and cup) in 2003. Mtairek won the league title with Ansar in 2006. He also played for Ahed, Shabab Sahel, Khoyol, and Sagesse.

== International career ==
Mteirek represented Lebanon at the 1998 Asian Games.

== Death ==
On 24 July 2014, Mteirek died of electrocution in his home in Beirut, aged 36. An annual friendly game is organized by Bourj FC as a remembrance of Ali.

== Honours ==
Tadamon Sour

- Lebanese FA Cup: 2000–01

Olympic Beirut

- Lebanese Premier League: 2002–03
- Lebanese FA Cup: 2002–03

Ansar

- Lebanese Premier League: 2005–06

Individual

- Lebanese Premier League Team of the Season: 2005–06, 2006–07
