= Lary Mehanna =

Lebanese footballer (born 1983)

Personal information
- Full name: Lary Gaby Mehanna
- Date of birth: 28 October 1983 (age 42)
- Place of birth: Beirut, Lebanon
- Height: 1.82 m (6 ft 0 in)
- Position: Goalkeeper

Youth career
- 1990–1998: Cergy-Pontoise
- 1998–2002: Paris Saint-Germain

Senior career*
Years	Team	Apps	(Gls)
2003–2011	Ansar		
2011–2012	Tremblay		
2012–2016	Ansar	60	(0)
2016–2018	Villeparisis		

International career
2006–2014	Lebanon	36	(0)
- * Club domestic league appearances and goals

Lary Gaby Mehanna (Arabic: لاري غابي مهنا; born 28 October 1983) is a Lebanese former footballer who played as a goalkeeper.

Mehanna was part of the youth team of Paris Saint-Germain, before moving back to Lebanon in 2003, playing for Ansar. After a short stint in France at Tremblay in 2011–12, Mehanna returned to Ansar, before moving to France in 2016, playing for amateur side Villeparisis.

Mehanna has played for Lebanon internationally between 2006 and 2014. He has played over 30 games, representing Lebanon at the 2010 FIFA World Cup qualifiers and the 2011 AFC Asian Cup qualifiers.

== Early life ==
Born on 28 October 1983 in Beirut, Lebanon, to a Lebanese father and a French mother, Mehanna moved aged one with his family to Dammartin-en-Goële, France, due to the ongoing Lebanese Civil War.

Aged six, Mehanna played as a defender for Cergy-Pontoise; he became a goalkeeper aged 12 during a youth tournament. Between 1998 and 2002 Mehanna played for Paris Saint-Germain's youth setup.

== Club career ==
Mehanna joined Lebanese Premier League side Ansar on 8 July 2003. He initially announced his retirement from football in December 2015, before moving to France in January 2016, joining Regional 3 side Villeparisis in the French eighth division.

== International career ==
On 16 October 2015, Mehanna announced his international retirement.

== Personal life ==
On 21 August 2016, Mehanna married Natalie Nasrallah. His favourite club is French side Paris Saint-Germain.

== Honours ==
Ansar

- Lebanese Premier League: 2005–06, 2006–07
- Lebanese FA Cup: 2005–06, 2006–07, 2009–10, 2011–12

Individual

- Lebanese Premier League Best Goalkeeper: 2007–08
- Lebanese Premier League Team of the Season: 2005–06, 2006–07

== See also ==
- List of Lebanon international footballers
