= Babken Melikyan =

Association football player

Personal information
- Full name: Babken Ludvig Melikyan
- Date of birth: 3 April 1960 (age 66)
- Place of birth: Yerevan, Armenian SSR, Soviet Union
- Height: 1.75 m (5 ft 9 in)
- Positions: Midfielder; forward

Senior career*
Years	Team	Apps	(Gls)
1977	SKIF Yerevan	9	(0)
1978–1984	Ararat Yerevan	204	(29)
1985–1986	SKA Odessa	46	(12)
1986	Dnepr Dnepropetrovsk	3	(0)
1987	Spartak Moscow	8	(1)
1987	Kotayk	18	(5)
1988–1991	Ararat Yerevan	103	(14)
1991–1998	Homenmen Beirut		
1998–2000	Sagesse		(5)
2000–2001	Homenetmen Beirut		
Total		391+	(66+)

International career
1993–1997	Lebanon	36	(3)

Managerial career
- 1998–2000: Sagesse
- 2002–2003: Lebanon (assistant)
- 2007: Gandzasar Kapan-2
- 2009: Mika-95
- 2010: Kilikia
- 2011: Kilikia-99
- 2015: Mika (assistant)
- * Club domestic league appearances and goals

Babken Ludvig Melikyan (Armenian: Բաբկեն Լյուդվիկ Մելիքյան; Arabic: بابكين لودفيغ ماليكيان; born 3 April 1960) is a professional football coach and former player who played as a midfielder or forward. Born in the Soviet Union, he played for the Lebanon national team.

== International career ==
Born in Armenia, Melikyan moved to Lebanon in 1991, and obtained citizenship through naturalisation via a presidential decree in order to play for the Lebanon national team.

== Managerial career ==
Melikyan was the Lebanon national team's assistant coach to Richard Tardy, between 2002 and 2003.

== Career statistics ==
=== International ===
Scores and results list Lebanon's goal tally first, score column indicates score after each Melikyan goal.

List of international goals scored by Babken Melikyan
No.	Date	Venue	Opponent	Score	Result	Competition	Ref.
1	7 May 1993	Beirut, Lebanon	India	1–0	2–2	1994 FIFA World Cup qualification	
2	26 January 1997	Beirut, Lebanon	Estonia	1–0	2–0	Friendly	
3	24 May 1997	National Stadium, Kallang, Singapore	Singapore	2–1	2–1	1998 FIFA World Cup qualification	

== Honours ==
=== Player ===
Ararat Yerevan

- IFA Shield: 1978

Dnepr Dnepropetrovsk

- USSR Federation Cup: 1986

Spartak Moscow

- Soviet Top League: 1987
- USSR Federation Cup: 1987

Homenmen Beirut

- Lebanese FA Cup runner-up: 1992–93, 1993–94, 1997–98

Sagesse

- Lebanese Second Division: 1998–99

Individual

- IFFHS All-time Lebanon Men's Dream Team
- Lebanese Premier League Team of the Season: 1996–97

=== Manager ===
Sagesse

- Lebanese Second Division: 1998–99

== See also ==
- List of Lebanon international footballers born outside Lebanon
