= Itani =

Itani is a surname. Notable people with the surname include:

- Ahmad Itani (born 1979), Lebanese football player
- Frances Itani (born 1942), Canadian fiction writer, poet and essayist
- Junichiro Itani (1926–2001), anthropologist and founder of Japanese primatology
- Muhieddine Itani (1929–2015), Lebanese football player
- Munir Itani, Lebanese alpine skier and Olympian
- Ted Itani (1939–2021), retired Canadian military officer and humanitarian
