= Edílson (footballer, born 1978) =

Brazilian footballer (born 1978)

Personal information
- Full name: Edílson José da Silva
- Date of birth: 8 December 1978 (age 47)
- Place of birth: Brazil
- Height: 1.77 m (5 ft 10 in)
- Position: Striker

Senior career*
Years	Team	Apps	(Gls)
2000–2001	Paraná	8	(1)
2002	Atlético Sorocaba		
2002–2004	Olympic Beirut		
2004–2005	Avispa Fukuoka	15	(2)
2006–2007	Rio Branco		
2007–2009	Ansar		
2009	Treze		
- * Club domestic league appearances and goals

Edílson José da Silva (born 8 December 1978) is a Brazilian former footballer who played as a striker.

== Career statistics ==
=== Club ===
Club	Season	League			Emperor's Cup		Total	
Club	Season	Division	Apps	Goals	Apps	Goals	Apps	Goals
Avispa Fukuoka	2004	J2 League	15	2	2	1	17	3
Avispa Fukuoka	2005	J2 League	0	0	0	0	0	0
Avispa Fukuoka	Total		15	2	2	1	17	3
Career total			15	2	2	1	17	3

== Honours ==
Individual

- Lebanese Premier League Best Player: 2003–04
- Lebanese Premier League Team of the Season: 2003–04
