= Talaat Najm =

Lebanese football referee

- Full name: Talaat Najm
- Born: 18 September 1968 (age 58); Nabatieh, Lebanon

International
Years	League	Role
1994–2012	FIFA listed	Referee
2008–2012	AFC Elite	Referee

Talaat Najm (Arabic: طلعت نجم; born 18 September 1968) is a Lebanese former football referee who is currently the referee coordinator for the Lebanese Football Association. He refereed at the AFC Asian Cup, and had also been a regular referee at the AFC Champions League.

== Honours ==
- Lebanese Premier League Best Referee: 2002–03, 2005–06, 2006–07, 2007–08, 2008–09
