= Hassan Daher =

Lebanese footballer (born 1983)

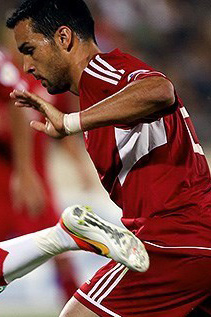
- Daher with Lebanon in 2013

Personal information
- Full name: Hassan Khalil Daher
- Date of birth: 4 March 1983 (age 43)
- Place of birth: Kuwait
- Height: 1.83 m (6 ft 0 in)
- Position: Centre-back

Senior career*
Years	Team	Apps	(Gls)
2004–2014	Shabab Sahel		(13)
2014	Perak	6	(1)
2014–2016	Ahed	10	(0)
2016–2018	Nabi Chit	19	(2)
Total		?	(16)

International career
2010–2013	Lebanon	9	(0)
- * Club domestic league appearances and goals

Hassan Khalil Daher (Arabic: حسن خليل ضاهر; born 4 March 1983) is a former professional footballer who played as a centre-back. Born in Kuwait, he played for the Lebanon national team.

== Club career ==
Daher began his senior career at Lebanese Premier League side Shabab Sahel, during the 2004–05 season. After one season in the Premier League, Shabab Sahel relegated to the Lebanese Second Division. During the 2005–06 Lebanese Second Division, Daher helped his side finish first and gain promotion back to the Premier League. In 2010–11, Daher was awarded for having played the most minutes in the league: 1980. In 2012–13 Daher was included in the Lebanese Premier League Team of the Season.

Daher remained at Shabab Sahel for 10 seasons, before signing for Malaysia Super League side Perak in April 2014. The Lebanese defender made his debut in Malaysia against Selangor. In September 2014 Daher moved back to Lebanon, signing for Ahed. In his first season at Ahed, Daher helped his team win the 2014–15 Lebanese Premier League. The following season, Daher won the 2015 Lebanese Elite Cup, and the 2015 Lebanese Super Cup. In 2016 Daher moved to Nabi Chit, where he retired two years later.

== International career ==
Daher made his international debut for Lebanon on 3 March 2010, in a 2011 AFC Asian Cup qualifier against Syria. Lebanon lost the encounter 4–0. Daher participated at the 2014 WAFF Championship in Qatar. He was also named in the 23-man squad for the 2014 World Cup qualifier against Uzbekistan, but remained on the bench for the match. Daher played nine games for Lebanon, between 2010 and 2013.

== Honours ==
Shabab Sahel

- Lebanese Second Division: 2005–06

Ahed

- Lebanese Premier League: 2014–15
- Lebanese Elite Cup: 2015
- Lebanese Super Cup: 2015

Individual

- Lebanese Premier League Team of the Season: 2008–09, 2012–13
- Lebanese Premier League most appearances: 2010–11

== See also ==
- List of Lebanon international footballers born outside Lebanon
