= Cheikha Sy =

Senegalese footballer

Cheikh Sy
Personal information
- Date of birth: June 5, 1990 (age 36)
- Place of birth: Dakar, Senegal
- Height: 1.65 m (5 ft 5 in)
- Position: Midfielder

Youth career
- AS Douanes

Senior career*
Years	Team	Apps	(Gls)
2008–2011	Al-Ain	?	(?)
2009–2010	→ Al-Wahda (loan)	25	(6)
2011–2012	AS Pikine	10	(2)
2013–2016	Al-Nejmeh	42	(7)
2016–2017	Al-Ansar	12	(0)
2017	Al-Ramtha	10	(0)
- * Club domestic league appearances and goals as of 19 December 2017

Cheikh Sy (born 5 June 1990) is a Senegalese football player.

== Career ==
Sy played in UAE, as well as in Syria, Senegal and Lebanon. He is plays as an attacking midfielder.

== Honours ==
Individual

- Lebanese Premier League Team of the Season: 2013–14, 2014–15
