= Sílvio (footballer, born 1970) =

Brazilian footballer

Personal information
- Full name: Sílvio César Ferreira da Costa
- Date of birth: 6 March 1970 (age 56)
- Place of birth: Rio de Janeiro, Brazil
- Height: 1.88 m (6 ft 2 in)
- Position: Forward

Senior career*
Years	Team	Apps	(Gls)
1988–1990	Fluminense	13	(3)
1990–1994	Bragantino	62	(19)
1994–1995	Logroñés	14	(3)
1995	Paraná	18	(3)
1996	Grêmio	2	(2)
1996	Guarani	3	(0)
1996	Goiás	11	(2)
1997	América		
1997	Internacional	18	(6)
1997–1998	Braga	12	(1)
1998	Bahia		
1999	São Caetano		
2000	São José		
2000	Gama	11	(2)
2002	CRB		
2002–2004	Olympic Beirut		(17)
2005	Coruripe		

International career
1991	Brazil	2	(0)
- * Club domestic league appearances and goals

Sílvio César Ferreira da Costa (born 6 March 1970), simply known as Sílvio, is a Brazilian former professional footballer who played as a forward. With Olympic Beirut, he was the 2002–03 Lebanese Premier League top scorer with 18 goals.

== Honours ==
Individual

- Lebanese Premier League Team of the Season: 2002–03
- Lebanese Premier League top scorer: 2002–03
