= Ahmad Itani =

Lebanese footballer (born 1979)

Personal information
- Full name: Ahmad Mohammad Najib Itani
- Date of birth: 26 February 1979 (age 47)
- Place of birth: Beirut, Lebanon
- Height: 1.75 m (5 ft 9 in)
- Position: Striker

Senior career*
Years	Team	Apps	(Gls)
1998–2005	Ahed		(31)
2006–2007	Shabab Sahel		(5)
Total		?	(36)

International career
2003	Lebanon	2	(0)
- * Club domestic league appearances and goals

Ahmad Mohammad Najib Itani (Arabic: أحمد محمد نجيب عيتاني; born 23 February 1979) is a Lebanese former footballer who played as a striker. He played for Ahed and Shabab Sahel at club level, and Lebanon internationally.

== Honours ==
Individual

- Lebanese Premier League Team of the Season: 2002–03
