= Mootaz El Jounaidi =

Lebanese footballer (born 1986)

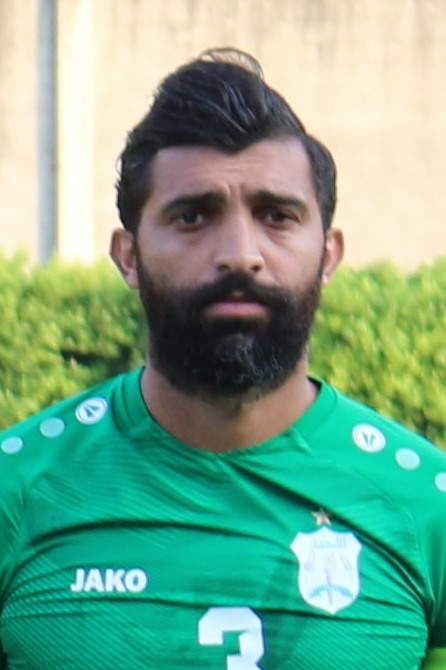
- El Jounaidi with Ansar in 2020

Personal information
- Full name: Mootaz Bellah Mohamad Ahmad Mohamad El Jounaidi
- Date of birth: 26 September 1986 (age 40)
- Place of birth: Beirut, Lebanon
- Height: 1.81 m (5 ft 11 in)
- Position: Centre-back

Youth career
- 2001–2006: Ansar

Senior career*
Years	Team	Apps	(Gls)
2006–2022	Ansar	130+	(15)
2013–2014	→ Dibba Al Fujairah (loan)	20	(0)
2014–2015	→ Naft Al-Janoob (loan)		
2017	→ FELDA United (loan)	12	(0)
2022–2023	Sagesse	18	(0)
Total		168+	(15)

International career
2007	Lebanon U23		
2008–2019	Lebanon	50	(0)
- * Club domestic league appearances and goals

Mootaz Bellah Mohamad Ahmad Mohamad El Jounaidi (Note: (Arabic: معتز بالله محمد أحمد محمد الجنيدي). Commonly referred to as Mootaz Bellah El Jounaidi (معتز بالله الجنيدي) or simply Mootaz El Jounaidi (معتز الجنيدي)) (born 26 September 1986) is a Lebanese former professional footballer who played as a centre-back for the Lebanon national team and Ansar, among other club sides.

== Club career ==
El Jounaidi joined Ansar's youth team in 2001, and made his senior debut during the 2006–07 season. He joined Dibba Al Fujairah in the UAE First Division League in September 2013. The following year, El Jounaidi was sent on a one-year loan to Iraqi Premier League side Naft Al-Janoob.

Following his two loan experiences, he returned to Ansar in August 2015. In January 2017, El Jounaidi moved to FELDA United in the Malaysia Super League on a one-year loan. In June 2021, he renewed with Ansar for two seasons. El Jounaidi left Ansar in July 2022, after having spent over 21 years with the club.

On 12 July 2022, El Jounaidi signed for Sagesse on a free transfer.

== International career ==
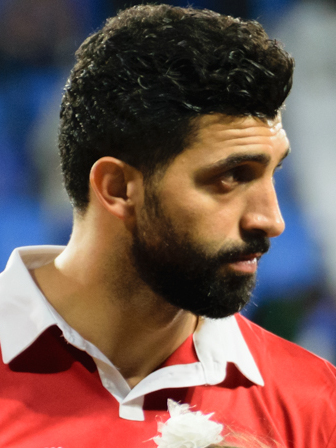
El Jounaidi with Lebanon at the 2019 AFC Asian Cup

El Jounaidi represented Lebanon internationally at under-23 level at the 2008 Summer Olympics qualifiers in 2007. At the senior level, he appeared in qualifying matches for the 2010, 2014 and 2018 FIFA World Cup. In December 2018, El Jounaidi was called up for the 2019 AFC Asian Cup squad. He earned 50 caps between 2008 and 2019.

== Style of play ==
While not a fast player, El Jounaidi's strengths lied in his experience and aerial threat.

== Honours ==
Ansar

- Lebanese Premier League: 2005–06, 2006–07, 2020–21
- Lebanese FA Cup: 2001–02, 2005–06, 2006–07, 2009–10, 2011–12, 2020–21; runner-up: 2021–22
- Lebanese Super Cup: 2012, 2021; runner-up: 2002, 2010
- Lebanese Elite Cup runner-up: 2005, 2008, 2010

== See also ==
- List of Lebanon international footballers
