= Tarek El Ali =

Lebanese footballer (born 1987)

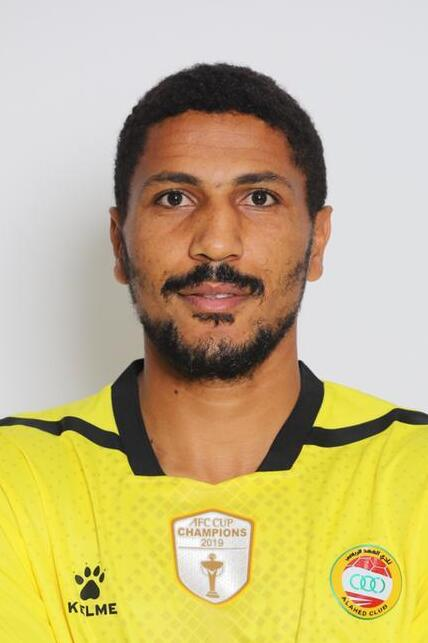
- El Ali with Ahed in 2021

Personal information
- Full name: Tarek Ahmad El Ali
- Date of birth: 6 February 1987 (age 39)
- Place of birth: Kenema, Sierra Leone
- Height: 1.81 m (5 ft 11 in)
- Position: Forward

Youth career
- 2003–2004: Nejmeh

Senior career*
Years	Team	Apps	(Gls)
2004–2005	Nejmeh		
2005–2012	Mabarra		(28)
2012–2021	Ahed	72	(15)
2016–2019	→ Tadamon Sour (loan)	28	(2)

International career
2007	Lebanon U23		(2)
2007–2011	Lebanon	5	(2)
- * Club domestic league appearances and goals

Tarek Ahmad El Ali (Arabic: طارق أحمد العلي; born 6 February 1986) is a former footballer who played as a forward. Born in Sierra Leone, he played for the Lebanon national team.

== Club career ==
=== Nejmeh ===
El Ali signed for Lebanese Premier League side Nejmeh's youth team on 4 August 2003. He began his senior career aged 17, in 2004–05. In his only season at Nejmeh, El Ali helped his side win the league, the Elite Cup, and the Super Cup.

=== Mabarra ===
In 2005 the Lebanese forward moved to Mabarra, staying seven seasons at the club, until 2012. El Ali won the Lebanese FA Cup with Mabarra 2007–08, the club's first, and competed in the 2009 AFC Cup. On 5 May 2009, El Ali scored his first AFC Cup goal against Iraqi club Erbil. However, with two wins in six matches, Mabarra came last in their group and were knocked-out of the competition.

=== Ahed ===
In 2012 El Ali moved to Ahed. During his four-season stay, he won a league title (2014–15), two Elite Cups (2013 and 2015), and a Super Cup (2015).

=== Loan to Tadamon Sour ===
On 17 August 2016, Tadamon Sour announced the signing of El Ali on a one-year loan from Ahed. Following a year at Tadamon Sour, playing 16 games and scoring twice, the loan was extended for two more years.

=== Return to Ahed ===
On 12 September 2019, Ahed announced the return from loan of El Ali. In his first season after returning to the club, El Ali helped Ahed lift the 2019 Super Cup, as well as the 2019 AFC Cup.

== International career ==
On 18 April 2007, El Ali scored two goals for Lebanon U23, in a 2–1 win against Indonesia in the 2008 Olympic Games Qualifiers. He also played for the senior team, scoring two goals in five games between 2007 and 2011.

== Career statistics ==
=== International ===
List of international goals scored by Tarek El Ali
No.	Date	Venue	Opponent	Score	Result	Competition
1	28 January 2008	Jordan	Jordan	1–1	1–4	Friendly
2	23 July 2011	Beirut, Lebanon	Bangladesh	2–0	4–0	2014 FIFA World Cup Qualification

== Honours ==
Nejmeh

- Lebanese Premier League: 2004–05
- Lebanese Elite Cup: 2004
- Lebanese Super Cup: 2004

Mabarra

- Lebanese FA Cup: 2007–08

Ahed

- AFC Cup: 2019
- Lebanese Premier League: 2014–15, 2021–22
- Lebanese Elite Cup: 2013, 2015; runner-up: 2021
- Lebanese Super Cup: 2015, 2019

Individual

- Lebanese Premier League Team of the Season: 2010–11

== See also ==
- List of Lebanon international footballers born outside Lebanon
