= Khodr Salame =

Lebanese footballer (born 1984)

Personal information
- Full name: Khodr Jihad Salame
- Date of birth: 4 December 1984 (age 41)
- Place of birth: Baraachit, Lebanon
- Height: 1.85 m (6 ft 1 in)
- Position: Midfielder

Senior career*
Years	Team	Apps	(Gls)
1999–2013	Safa		(38)
2013–2015	Naft Maysan		(9)
2015	Al-Orobah	6	(0)
2015–2017	Naft Al-Junoob		
2017–2021	Racing Beirut		
2021	Sagesse		

International career
2000–2015	Lebanon	18	(0)
- * Club domestic league appearances and goals as of 21:30, 20 March 2021 (UTC)

Khodr Jihad Salame (Arabic: خضر جهاد سلامة; born 4 December 1984) is a Lebanese former professional footballer who played as a midfielder.

== Club career ==
Salame helped Safa reach the final of the 2008 AFC Cup, defeating Indian club Dempo in the semi-final.

In March 2021, Salame joined Sagesse in the Lebanese Second Division ahead of the second leg of the 2020–21 season. Salame retired at the end of the season.

== Honours ==
Safa

- Lebanese Premier League: 2011–12, 2012–13
- Lebanese FA Cup: 2012–13
- Lebanese Elite Cup: 2009, 2012
- AFC Cup runner-up: 2008

Individual

- Lebanese Premier League Team of the Season: 2011–12
- Lebanese Premier League top assist provider: 2011–12
