= Toninho dos Santos (footballer, born 1965) =

Brazilian footballer (born 1965)

Personal information
- Full name: Antônio Teodoro dos Santos Filho
- Date of birth: 29 May 1965 (age 61)
- Place of birth: Ivaiporã, Paraná, Brazil
- Height: 1.87 m (6 ft 2 in)
- Position: Forward

Youth career
- Athletico Paranaense

Senior career*
Years	Team	Apps	(Gls)
1988–1989	Luis Ángel Firpo		
1989	Herediano		
1990	Luis Ángel Firpo		
1990–1992	América	59	(21)
1992–1993	Deportivo Cali		
1994	Colo-Colo	30	(12)
1995	Puebla	16	(7)
1995	Deportes Tolima		
1996	Junior		
1996	Deportivo Cali		
1996–1997	Atlético Bucaramanga		
1997	Fluminense	7	(0)
1997–1998	Al-Ittihad Jeddah		
1998–1999	Al-Jazira		
1999–2000	Al-Ansar		(14)
2000–2001	Al-Ittihad		
2002–2003	Águila		
2004	Blooming		
- * Club domestic league appearances and goals

Antônio Teodoro dos Santos Filho (born 29 May 1965), commonly known as Toninho dos Santos or simply Toninho, is a former footballer who played as a forward. He was nicknamed El Bíblico ("The Biblical").

== Early life ==
Toninho was born on 29 May 1965 in Ivaiporã, Paraná, Brazil, to Antonio and Marcilia; he has five siblings. Aged 14, he began his youth career at Athletico Paranaense. Toninho played for various other local clubs, before joining Luis Ángel Firpo in El Salvador.

== Club career ==
Nicknamed El Bíblico ("The Biblical"), Toninho began his senior career at Salvadoran Luis Ángel Firpo, playing there between 1988 and 1989. In 1989 he moved to Costa Rican club Herediano, before moving back to Luis Ángel Firpo in 1990. Between 1990 and 1992 Toninho played for Mexican club América; he helped them lift the 1991 Copa Interamericana against Olimpia from Paraguay.

Between 1992 and 1993 he played for Deportivo Cali in Colombia, then for Colo-Colo in Chile in 1994, scoring 28 goals in 50 games in all competitions and helping the team win the 1994 Copa Chile. Toninho played for Puebla in Mexico and Tolima in Colombia in 1995, then for Colombian teams Junior, Deportivo Cali, and Bucaramanga 1996. In 1997 Toninho moved to his native Brazil, playing for Fluminense.

In 1997 Toninho moved from South America to the Middle East, playing for Saudi club Al-Ittihad 1997–98, Emirati club Al-Jazira in 1998–99, Lebanese club Al-Ansar in 1999–2000, and Qatari club Al-Gharafa in 2000–01. He returned to South America in 2002, playing for Águila in El Salvador until 2003, before playing for Blooming in Bolivia in 2004, where he retired.

== Personal life ==
Toninho has two children: Bruno, born in Mexico, and Janahyna. Following his retirement as a player in 2004, he opened his shoe business named "Tomate Azul".

As of 2020, Toninho was in the process of acquiring Salvadoran nationality.

== Honours ==
América

- Copa Interamericana: 1991

Colo-Colo

- Copa Chile: 1994

Ansar

- Lebanese Federation Cup: 1999
- Lebanese Super Cup: 1999

Individual

- Lebanese Premier League top scorer: 1999–2000 (Note: Tied with Sahib Abbas)
