= Bourj Hammoud Stadium =

Stadium in Beirut, Lebanon

- ملعب برج حمود
- Interactive map of Bourj Hammoud Stadium
- Location: Bourj Hammoud, Lebanon
- Coordinates: 33°53′16″N 35°32′49″E
- Owner: Bourj Hammoud Municipality
- Operator: Bourj Hammoud Municipality
- Capacity: 10,000
- Surface: Grass

Tenants
- Homenetmen; Homenmen; Bourj

Bourj Hammoud Stadium (Arabic: ملعب برج حمود) is a stadium in Bourj Hammoud, Beirut, Lebanon. It is mostly used for football matches, and has a capacity of 10,000 people.

== History ==
In 1999, Bourj Hammoud Municipality began rehabilitation works at the stadium, which included replacing the grass pitch, drilling an artesian well, installing an irrigation system, improving the lighting, and renovating the stands and changing rooms. In 2006, the municipality added covered basketball courts within the complex, which were inaugurated on 19 September 2006. In 2025, plans were announced to rehabilitate the stadium according to Olympic standards.
