= 2007–08 Lebanese FA Cup =

The 2007–08 Lebanese FA Cup was the 36th edition of the national football cup competition of Lebanon. It started with the first round on 20 October 2007, and ended on 3 July 2008 with the final. The cup winners were guaranteed a place in the 2009 AFC Cup.

== Pre-qualifying stage ==
=== First round ===
Date	Home team	Score	Away team
20 October 2007	Shams Baalbek	3–0	Marin Tripoli
20 October 2007	Tadamon Beirut	2–0	Jihad Hay Sellom
20 October 2007	Wahd Marj	6–4	Maarakeh
21 October 2007	Shabab Arabi	4–0	Wafaa Ghoubeiry
21 October 2007	Zamalek Beirut	1–2	Tadamon Hermel
21 October 2007	Annasr Aley	1–4	Adab Kfarshima

=== Intermediate Round ===
Date	Home team	Score	Away team
26 October 2007	Shams Baalbek	6–1	Wahd Marj
26 October 2007	Shabab Arabi	3–0	Adab Kfarshima
Tadamon Hermel and Tadamon Beirut received byes

=== Final round ===
Date	Home team	Score	Away team
27 October 2007	Tadamon Beirut	7–0	Tadamon Hermel
31 October 2007	Shams Baalbek	2–1	Shabab Arabi

== Qualifying stage ==
=== Semifinal round ===
Date	Home team	Score	Away team
19 November 2007	Mawadda Tripoli	0–1	Bourj
20 November 2007	Salam Zgharta	14–1	Mahabbe Tripoli
21 November 2007	Shams Baalbek	0–2	Rayyan
21 November 2007	Akhaa Ahli Aley	2–0	Ahli Nabatieh
27 November 2007	Homenmen	4–3	Egtmaaey
27 November 2007	Islah Borj Shmali	1–2	Riyadi Abbasiya
28 November 2007	Nahda Barelias	4–2	Homenetmen
28 November 2007	Chabab Ghazieh	2–3 (a.e.t)	Tadamon Beirut

=== Final round ===
Date	Home team	Score	Away team
14 December 2007	Tadamon Beirut	2–0	Rayyan
14 December 2007	Bourj	0–2	Homenmen
15 December 2007	Nahda Barelias	3–2	Riyadi Abbasiya
17 December 2007	Salam Zgharta	2–3	Akhaa Ahli Aley

== Proper Rounds ==
=== Round of 16 ===
Date	Home team	Score	Away team
18 January 2008	Ahli Saida	2–0	Akhaa Ahli Aley
19 January 2008	Irshad	2–1	Homenmen
20 January 2008	Sagesse	0–2	Tripoli
30 January 2008	Ansar	4–1	Tadamon Beirut
31 January 2008	Mabarra	1–0	Tadamon Sour
31 January 2008	Nejmeh	0–1	Shabab Sahel
31 January 2008	Racing Beirut	1–1 (4–3 pen.)	Ahed
13 February 2008	Nahda Barelias	1–3	Safa

=== Quarterfinals ===
Date	Home team	Score	Away team
13 February 2008	Ahli Saida	0–1	Mabarra
13 February 2008	Tripoli	1–2	Racing Beirut
13 February 2008	Ansar	1–1 (3–4 pen.)	Irshad
30 February 2008	Safa	1–1 (4–2 pen.)	Shabab Sahel

=== Semi-finals ===
Date	Home team	Score	Away team
29 June 2008	Mabarra	3–0	Irshad
29 June 2008	Safa	1–0	Racing Beirut

=== Final ===
3 July 2008

Mabarra	2–1	Safa
Ali 6', 63'	Report	Saadi 80'

Camille Chamoun Sports City Stadium, Beirut
