= 2015 Lebanese Elite Cup =

Lebanese Elite Cup
- Season: 2015
- Champions: Al Ahed
- Matches: 9
- Goals: 29 (3.22 per match)

The 2015 Lebanese Elite Cup is the 18th edition of the Lebanese Elite Cup. The competition began on 11 September and concluded with the final on 27 September. It featured six teams, comprising the top four clubs in the 2014–15 Lebanese Premier League and the two finalists of the 2014–15 Lebanese FA Cup.

== Group stage ==
=== Group A ===
Team	Pld	W	D	L	GF	GA	GD	Pts
(Lebanon) Al Ahed	2	1	1	0	3	1	+2	4
(Lebanon) Safa	2	0	2	0	4	4	0	2
(Lebanon) Al-Nejmeh	2	0	1	1	3	5	−2	1

11 September 2015
12:30

Al Ahed	2 – 0	Al-Nejmeh
Iguma 58'; Zreik 82'

Amin Abdelnour Stadium
15 September 2015
12:30

Al Ahed	1 – 1	Safa
? 16'		Hazimeh 57'

Amin Abdelnour Stadium
19 September 2015
12:30

Al-Nejmeh	3 – 3	Safa
Toreh 28'; Takaji (penalty scored) 80'(pen); Takaji (penalty missed) 83'; Takaji 83'		Mansour (penalty scored) 12'(pen); El Baba 23'; Hazimeh 55'

Amin Abdelnour Stadium

=== Group B ===
Team	Pld	W	D	L	GF	GA	GD	Pts
(Lebanon) Al Ansar	2	1	1	0	5	4	+1	4
(Lebanon) Nabi Sheet	2	0	2	0	2	2	0	2
(Lebanon) Tripoli	2	0	1	1	4	5	−1	1

11 September 2015
12:30

Tripoli	3 – 4	Al Ansar
? 45' ? (penalty scored) 82' ? 86'		Galán 2', (penalty scored) 10'(pen); Al-Zoughbi 4'; Abboud 68'

Beirut Municipal Stadium
15 September 2015
12:30

Tripoli	1 – 1	Nabi Sheet
? 59'		Ota 11'

Safa Stadium
19 September 2015
12:30

Al Ansar	1 – 1	Nabi Sheet
Galán (penalty scored) 16'(pen)		Ayoub (penalty scored) 37'(pen)

Beirut Municipal Stadium

== Final stage ==
Semi-finals
23 September - Beirut
Al Ansar	1
Safa	3
23 September - Bhamdoun
Al Ahed	2
Nabi Sheet	1

Final
27 September - Bhamdoun
Safa	0
Al Ahed	1

=== Semi finals ===
23 September 2015
12:30

Al Ansar	1 – 3	Safa
Ghaddar 50'; Galán (penalty missed) 52'		Al Kurdi 24'; El Baba 72', 80'

Beirut Municipal Stadium

23 September 2015
12:30

Al Ahed	2 – 1	Nabi Sheet
? 25'; Nasseredine 48' (o.g.)		Bazzi 55'

Amin Abdelnour Stadium

=== Final ===
27 September 2015
12:30

Safa	0 – 1 (a.e.t.)	Al Ahed
		El Ali 92'

Amin Abdelnour Stadium
