= 2013 Lebanese Elite Cup =

Lebanese Elite Cup
- Season: 2013
- Champions: Al Ahed
- Matches played: 9
- Goals scored: 27 (3 per match)

The 2013 Lebanese Elite Cup was the 16th edition of the football tournament in Lebanon. The competition ran from 25 August to 14 September. The tournament featured the six best teams from the 2012–13 Lebanese Premier League season.

== Group stage ==
=== Group A ===
Team	Pld	W	D	L	GF	GA	GD	Pts
(Lebanon) Safa	2	1	1	0	5	3	+2	4
(Lebanon) Shabab Al-Sahel	2	1	0	1	3	4	−1	3
(Lebanon) Al-Akhaa Al-Ahli Aley	2	0	1	1	3	4	−1	1

25 August 2013
14:30

Safa	2 – 2	Al-Akhaa Al-Ahli Aley

28 August 2013
14:30

Safa	3 – 1	Shabab Al-Sahel

1 September 2013
14:30

Shabab Al-Sahel	1 – 2	Al-Akhaa Al-Ahli Aley

=== Group B ===
Team	Pld	W	D	L	GF	GA	GD	Pts
(Lebanon) Al Ahed	2	1	1	0	4	2	+2	4
(Lebanon) Al-Nejmeh	2	1	1	0	2	1	+1	4
(Lebanon) Racing Beirut	2	0	0	2	1	4	−3	0

25 August 2013
15:30

Al-Nejmeh	1 – 1	Al Ahed

28 August 2013
15:30

Racing Beirut	0 – 1	Al-Nejmeh

1 September 2013
15:30

Al Ahed	3 – 1	Racing Beirut

== Final stage ==
Semi-finals
4 September - Beirut
Al Ahed	3
Shabab Al-Sahel	2
4 September - Beirut
Safa	1(3)
Al-Nejmeh	1(5)

Final
13 September - Beirut
Al Ahed	2
Al-Nejmeh	0

=== Semi finals ===
4 September 2013
13:45

Al Ahed	3 – 2	Shabab Al-Sahel

4 September 2013
13:45

Safa	1 – 1 3 - 5 pens	Al-Nejmeh

=== Final ===
14 September 2013
13:45

Al Ahed	2 – 0	Al-Nejmeh

Camille Chamoun Sports City Stadium, Beirut
