= 2009–10 Lebanese FA Cup =

Association football tournament

The 2010 edition of the Lebanese FA Cup is the 38th edition to be played. It is the premier knockout tournament for football teams in Lebanon.

Al-Ahed went into this edition as the holders. Al Ansar holds the most wins with 11 titles.

The cup winner were guaranteed a place in the 2011 AFC Cup.

== Round 1 ==
18 teams play a knockout tie. 8 clubs advance to the next round. Ties played on 9 and 10 January 2010

Tie no	Home team	Score	Away team
1	Al-Ahli Sidon (I)	1 – 1	Al Islah Bourg Shamaly (I)
Al Islah Al Bourj Al Shimaly won 5 - 3 on penalties
2	Al Ansar (I)	2 - 0	Tripoli SC
3	Safa (I)	2 - 2	Al-Mabarrah (I)
Al-Mabarrah won 7 - 6 on penalties
4	Shabab Al-Sahel (I)	4 - 1	Al Modha Trables
5	Al-Hikma (I)	1 - 2	Al-Akhaa Al-Ahli Aley
6	Shabab Al-Ghazieh (I)	1 - 2	Al Nejmeh (I)
7	Al Ahed (I)	8 - 1	Al Ijtima'ih Tripoli
8	Al-Tadamon Tyre (I)	0 - 0	Racing Beirut (I)
Al-Tadamon Tyre won 4 - 2 on penalties

== Quarter-finals ==
8 teams play a knockout tie. 4 clubs advance to the next round. Ties played on 30 and 31 January 2010

Tie no	Home team	Score	Away team
1	Al Islah Al Bourj Al Shimaly	0 – 3	Al-Mabarrah
2	Al Ansar	2 - 0	Al-Tadamon Tyre
3	Al Ikhaa Al Ahli	1 - 0	Shabab Al-Sahel
4	Al Nejmeh	1 - 3	Al Ahed

== Semi-finals ==
4 teams play a knockout tie. 2 clubs advance to the final. Ties played on 10 and 11 April 2010

Tie no	Home team	Score	Away team
1	Al Ikhaa Al Ahli	0 – 2	Al-Mabarrah
2	Al Ansar	3 - 1	Al Ahed

== Final ==
Tie no	Home team	Score	Away team
1	Al-Mabarrah	1 – 2	Al Ansar
