= 1999–2000 Lebanese Premier League =

Lebanese Premier League
- Season: 1999–2000
- Champions: Al-Nejmeh
- Runner up: Al-Ansar
- Relegated: Al-Ahed; Al Majd FC
- Top goalscorer: Toninho Santos; Sahib Abbas; (14 goals each)

Statistics of Lebanese Premier League for the 1999–2000 season.

== Overview ==
Al-Nejmeh won the championship.

== League standings ==
Pos	Team	Pld	W	D	L	GF	GA	GD	Pts
1	Al-Nejmeh	22	13	8	1	34	15	+19	47
2	Al-Ansar	22	12	8	2	38	17	+21	44
3	Al Akhaa Al Ahli	22	9	6	7	32	24	+8	33
4	Tadamon Sour	22	7	8	7	28	26	+2	29
5	Safa	22	7	8	7	24	26	−2	29
6	Hekmeh FC	22	6	10	6	25	23	+2	28
7	Salam Zgharta	22	7	6	9	32	30	+2	27
8	Homenmen	22	6	9	7	26	27	−1	27
9	Shabab Al-Sahel	22	6	8	8	18	23	−5	26
10	Homenetmen	22	7	5	10	25	34	−9	26
11	Al-Ahed	22	7	3	12	29	42	−13	24
12	Al Majd FC	22	2	7	13	20	44	−24	13

Source: rsssf.com
