= 2000–01 Lebanese Premier League =

Lebanese Premier League
- Season: 2000–01
- Champions: None

Statistics of Lebanese Premier League for the 2000–01 season.

== Temporary Official Final table ==
Pos	Team	Pld	W	D	L	GF	GA	GD	Pts	Qualification
1	Al-Ansar	8	4	3	1	14	8	+6	15	
2	Al-Nejmeh	8	4	2	2	15	8	+7	14	
3	Hekmeh FC	8	4	2	2	18	12	+6	14	
4	Racing Club	8	2	1	5	8	19	−11	7	
5	Homenetmen Beirut	8	1	2	5	10	18	−8	5	
–	Tadamon Sour	0	0	0	0	0	0	0	0	Annulled
–	Al Akhaa Al Ahli	0	0	0	0	0	0	0	0	Annulled
–	Salam Zgharta	0	0	0	0	0	0	0	0	Annulled
–	Safa	0	0	0	0	0	0	0	0	Annulled
–	Shabab Al-Sahel	0	0	0	0	0	0	0	0	Annulled
–	Al Ahli Saida	0	0	0	0	0	0	0	0	Annulled
–	Homenmen Beirut	0	0	0	0	0	0	0	0	Annulled

Source: rsssf.com

== Revoked Final table ==
Pos	Team	Pld	W	D	L	GF	GA	GD	Pts
1	Al-Nejmeh	22	14	4	4	47	22	+25	46
2	Hekmeh FC	22	14	4	4	49	27	+22	46
3	Tadamon Sour	22	14	3	5	49	21	+28	45
4	Al Akhaa Al Ahli	22	13	4	5	43	26	+17	43
5	Salam Zgharta	22	9	7	6	33	29	+4	34
6	Al-Ansar	22	9	6	7	39	30	+9	33
7	Safa	22	7	5	10	26	35	−9	26
8	Shabab Al-Sahel	22	4	7	11	23	44	−21	19
9	Racing Club	22	3	6	13	22	45	−23	15
10	Al Ahli Saida	22	4	3	15	17	46	−29	15
11	Homenmen Beirut	22	2	7	13	23	43	−20	13
12	Homenetmen Beirut F.C.	22	2	6	14	22	49	−27	12

Source: rsssf.com
