= 1996–97 Lebanese Premier League =

Lebanese football league season

Statistics of Lebanese Premier League for the 1996–97 season.

== Overview ==
Al-Ansar won the championship.

== League standings ==
Pos	Team	Pld	W	D	L	GF	GA	GD	Pts
1	Al-Ansar	26	20	5	1	59	7	+52	65
2	Al-Nejmeh	26	18	4	4	52	22	+30	58
3	Homenetmen Beirut	26	15	4	7	55	30	+25	49
4	Homenmen Beirut	26	15	3	8	47	35	+12	48
5	Al-Safa	26	10	8	8	30	22	+8	38
6	Al Akhaa Al Ahli	26	10	8	8	29	30	−1	38
7	Al Riyada w Al-Adab	26	8	9	9	19	20	−1	33
8	Tadamon Sour	26	9	5	12	25	35	−10	32
9	Shabab Al-Sahel	26	7	7	12	20	32	−12	28
10	Al Bourj	26	7	7	12	19	31	−12	28
11	La Sagesse	26	6	6	14	30	42	−12	24
12	Racing Club	26	5	7	14	18	38	−20	22
13	Salam Zgharta	26	3	11	12	23	48	−25	20
14	Al-Shabiba Mazraa	26	2	10	14	19	53	−34	16

Source: rsssf.com
