= 2001–02 Lebanese Premier League =

Lebanese Premier League
- Season: 2001–02
- Champions: Al-Nejmeh
- Runner up: Hekmeh FC
- Relegated: Al Ahli Saida; Racing Beirut
- Top goalscorer: (Iraq) Mahmoud Majeed (24)

Statistics of Lebanese Premier League for the 2001–02 season.

== Overview ==
Al-Nejmeh won the championship.

== League standings ==
Pos	Team	Pld	W	D	L	GF	GA	GD	Pts
1	Al-Nejmeh	26	18	7	1	61	24	+37	61
2	Hekmeh FC	26	18	6	2	52	30	+22	60
3	Tadamon Sour	26	17	8	1	59	16	+43	59
4	Shabab Al-Sahel	26	15	4	7	43	27	+16	49
5	Safa	26	14	3	9	49	35	+14	45
6	Salam Zgharta	26	12	5	9	40	29	+11	41
7	Al-Bourj	26	10	5	11	42	42	0	35
8	Al-Ansar	26	8	10	8	31	28	+3	34
9	Al-Ahed	26	8	10	8	36	36	0	34
10	Al Akhaa Al Ahli	26	9	6	11	27	33	−6	33
11	Homenmen Beirut	26	8	5	13	32	45	−13	29
12	Homenetmen Beirut	26	1	6	19	18	48	−30	9
13	Al Ahli Saida	26	2	3	21	20	64	−44	9
14	Racing Beirut	26	0	6	20	15	68	−53	6

Source: rsssf.com
