= 1997–98 Lebanese Premier League =

Lebanese football league season

Statistics of Lebanese Premier League for the 1997–98 season.

== Overview ==
Al-Ansar won the championship.

== League standings ==
Pos	Team	Pld	W	D	L	GF	GA	GD	Pts	Qualification or relegation
1	Al-Ansar	26	21	4	1	70	19	+51	67	Champions
2	Al-Nejmeh	26	15	8	3	37	16	+21	53	
3	Tadamon Sour	26	12	7	7	32	26	+6	43	
4	Homenmen Beirut	26	9	9	8	38	38	0	36	
5	Safa	26	9	9	8	25	30	−5	36	
6	Al-Ahed	26	7	13	6	25	31	−6	34	
7	Shabab Al-Sahel	26	8	8	10	29	33	−4	32	
8	Al Akhaa Al Ahli	26	8	7	11	30	34	−4	31	
9	Al Ahli Saida	26	8	7	11	26	28	−2	31	
10	Bourj	26	6	12	8	29	31	−2	30	
11	Homenetmen Beirut	26	8	6	12	36	41	−5	30	
12	Hekmeh FC	26	6	10	10	29	37	−8	28	Relegated
13	Racing Beirut	26	4	8	14	14	33	−19	20	Relegated
14	Al-Reyada wa Al-Adab	26	3	8	15	17	40	−23	17	Relegated

Source: rsssf.com
