= 1998–99 Lebanese Premier League =

Lebanese football league season

Statistics of Lebanese Premier League for the 1998–99 season.

== Overview ==
Al-Ansar won the championship.

== League standings ==
Pos	Team	Pld	W	D	L	GF	GA	GD	Pts
1	Al-Ansar	22	14	6	2	35	13	+22	48
2	Safa	22	11	5	6	36	23	+13	38
3	Tadamon Sour	22	11	3	8	39	27	+12	36
4	Shabab Al-Sahel	22	8	6	8	25	22	+3	30
5	Homenmen Beirut	22	7	9	6	28	32	−4	30
6	Al Akhaa Al Ahli	22	7	7	8	31	30	+1	28
7	Al-Nejmeh	22	6	9	7	22	15	+7	27
8	Salam Zgharta	22	5	11	6	14	13	+1	26
9	Al-Ahed	22	6	8	8	30	36	−6	26
10	Homenetmen Beirut	22	7	5	10	21	33	−12	26
11	Al Ahli Saida	22	5	7	10	25	38	−13	22
12	Bourj	22	4	6	12	15	39	−24	12 (Note: 6 points deducted.)

Source: rsssf.com
