= 2002–03 Lebanese Premier League =

Lebanese Premier League
- Season: 2002–03
- Champions: Tripoli SC
- Runner up: Al-Nejmeh
- Relegated: Al Akhaa Al Ahli; Al Bourj
- Top goalscorer: (Brazil) Sílvio (18)

Statistics of Lebanese Premier League for the 2002–03 season.

== Overview ==
Tripoli SC won the championship.

== League standings ==
Pos	Team	Pld	W	D	L	GF	GA	GD	Pts
1	Tripoli SC	22	16	2	4	39	12	+27	50
2	Al-Nejmeh	22	14	5	3	43	22	+21	47
3	Al-Ahed	22	13	4	5	36	19	+17	43
4	Al-Ansar	22	9	10	3	32	19	+13	37
5	Tadamon Sour	22	8	8	6	30	27	+3	32
6	Safa	22	7	6	9	25	31	−6	27
7	Shabab Al-Sahel	22	5	8	9	29	34	−5	23
8	La Sagesse	22	5	8	9	25	32	−7	23
9	Salam Zgharta	22	6	5	11	29	37	−8	23
10	Al-Mabarra	22	5	8	9	25	34	−9	23
11	Al Akhaa Al Ahli	22	4	4	14	17	38	−21	16
12	Al Bourj	22	5	2	15	21	46	−25	11 (Note: 6 points deducted.)

Source: rsssf.com

== Playoff ==
Pos	Team	Pld	W	D	L	GF	GA	GD	Pts
1	Tripoli SC	25	17	3	5	40	14	+26	54
2	Al-Nejmeh	25	16	5	4	49	26	+23	53
3	Al-Ahed	25	15	5	5	44	22	+22	50
4	Al-Ansar	25	9	10	6	32	25	+7	37

Source: rsssf.com
