= 2003–04 Lebanese Premier League =

Lebanese Premier League
- Season: 2003–04
- Champions: Al-Nejmeh
- Runner up: Al-Ahed
- Relegated: Homenmen Beirut; Homentmen Beirut
- Top goalscorer: Mohammad Kassas (22)

Statistics of Lebanese Premier League for the 2003–04 season.

== Overview ==
Al Nejmeh won the championship.

== League standings ==
Pos	Team	Pld	W	D	L	GF	GA	GD	Pts
1	Al Nejmeh	22	17	3	2	67	18	+49	54
2	Al-Ahed	22	14	5	3	39	20	+19	47
3	Olympic Beirut	22	10	5	7	32	27	+5	35
4	Safa	22	7	10	5	32	34	−2	31
5	Al-Mabarra	22	7	7	8	27	26	+1	28
6	Al-Ansar	22	7	7	8	26	27	−1	28
7	La Sagesse	22	7	6	9	28	31	−3	27
8	Shabab Al-Sahel	22	6	8	8	27	38	−11	26
9	Tadamon Sour	22	7	4	11	30	34	−4	25
10	Salam Zgharta	22	5	8	9	24	33	−9	23
11	Homentmen Beirut	22	6	3	13	16	37	−21	21
12	Homenmen Beirut	22	4	4	14	31	54	−23	16

Source: rsssf.com
