= List of Lebanese Premier League top scorers =

The following is a list of Lebanese Premier League top scorers by season since 1960–61. The most recent top scorer is Hicham Khalf Allah of Ansar, who scored 18 goals in the 2025–26 season. Starting from the 2023–24 season, the league's top scorer is awarded the "Adnan Al Sharqi Icon Award", named in honor of the late Lebanese football player and coach.

Fadi Alloush holds the record for the most goals in a single season, with 32, while Fouad Saad registered the fewest for a top scorer, with six. Seven players have finished as top scorer more than once: Elhadji Malick Tall (four times), Hassan Maatouk (three times), and Levon Altounian, Fadi Alloush, Mohammad Kassas, Mohamad Ghaddar, and Lucas Galán (twice each). Mohammad Kassas was the first player to win the title in consecutive seasons, in 2003–04 and 2004–05.

== Winners ==
| Season | Player(s) | Nationality | Club(s) | Goals |
|---|---|---|---|---|
| 1933–34 | | | | |
| 1934–35 | | | | |
| 1935–36 | | | | |
| 1936–37 | | | | |
| 1937–38 | | | | |
| 1938–39 | | | | |
| 1939–40 | The championship was not held | | | |
| 1940–41 | | | | |
| 1941–42 | | | | |
| 1942–43 | | | | |
| 1943–44 | | | | |
| 1944–45 | | | | |
| 1945–46 | | | | |
| 1946–47 | | | | |
| 1947–48 | | | | |
| 1948–49 | | | | |
| 1949–50 | The championship was not held | | | |
| 1950–51 | | | | |
| 1951–52 | The championship was not held | | | |
| 1952–53 | The championship was not held | | | |
| 1953–54 | | | | |
| 1954–55 | | | | |
| 1955–56 | | | | |
| 1956–57 | | | | |
| 1957–58 | The championship was not held | | | |
| 1958–59 | The championship was not held | | | |
| 1959–60 | The championship was not held | | | |
| 1960–61 | Mardik Tchaparian | Lebanon | Homenmen | 15 |
| 1961–62 | The championship was not held | | | |
| 1962–63 | Levon Altounian | Lebanon | Homenetmen | 14 |
| 1963–64 | The championship was not held | | | |
| 1964–65 | Joseph Abou Mrad | Lebanon | Racing Beirut | 18 |
| 1965–66 | The championship was not held | | | |
| 1966–67 | Levon Altounian (2) | Lebanon | Homenetmen | 19 |
| 1967–68 | The championship was not held | | | |
| 1968–69 | Muhieddine Itani | Lebanon | Nejmeh | 15 |
| 1969–70 | Hani Abdel Fattah | Palestine | Safa | 19 |
| 1970–71 | The championship was not held | | | |
| 1971–72 | The championship was not held | | | |
| 1972–73 | Youssef Al Ghoul | Lebanon | Nejmeh | 8 |
| 1973–74 | The championship was not held | | | |
| 1974–75 | Jamal Al Khatib | Lebanon | Nejmeh | 13 |
| 1975–76 | The championship was not held | | | |
| 1976–77 | The championship was not held | | | |
| 1977–78 | The championship was not held | | | |
| 1978–79 | The championship was not held | | | |
| 1979–80 | The championship was not held | | | |
| 1980–81 | The championship was not held | | | |
| 1981–82 | The championship was not held | | | |
| 1982–83 | The championship was not held | | | |
| 1983–84 | The championship was not held | | | |
| 1984–85 | The championship was not held | | | |
| 1985–86 | The championship was not held | | | |
| 1986–87 | The championship was not held | | | |
| 1987–88 | Fouad Saad | Lebanon | Ansar | 6 |
| 1988–89 | The championship was not held | | | |
| 1989–90 | Jamal Al Haj | Lebanon | Nejmeh | 12 |
| 1990–91 | Fadi Alloush | Lebanon | Ansar | 32 |
| 1991–92 | Walid Dahrouj | Lebanon | Safa | 20 |
| 1992–93 | Fadi Alloush (2) | Lebanon | Ansar | 27 |
| 1993–94 | Mahmoud Hammoud | Lebanon | Nejmeh | 15 |
| 1994–95 | Vitaliy Agasyan | Armenia | Homenmen | 16 |
| 1995–96 | Assaf Khalifa | Syria | Nejmeh | 19 |
| 1996–97 | Peter Prosper | Trinidad and Tobago | Ansar | 22 |
| 1997–98 | Ahmed Jarada | Egypt | Ansar | 13 |
| 1998–99 | Haitham Zein | Lebanon | Tadamon Sour | 15 |
| 1999–00 | Toninho dos Santos; Sahib Abbas | Brazil; Iraq | Ansar; Salam Zgharta | 14 |
| 2000–01 | Not awarded (Note: Originally, Haitham Zein (Tadamon Sour) from Lebanon was the top scorer (25 goals), but nine of his goals were annulled for match-fixing; after that Errol McFarlane (Nejmeh) from Trinidad and Tobago was the top scorer (21 goals), but eventually the entire season was annulled.) | | | |
| 2001–02 | Haidar Mahmoud | Iraq | Shabab Sahel | 24 |
| 2002–03 | Sílvio | Brazil | Olympic Beirut | 18 |
| 2003–04 | Mohammad Kassas | Lebanon | Nejmeh | 22 |
| 2004–05 | Mohammad Kassas (2) | Lebanon | Nejmeh | 21 |
| 2005–06 | Ali Nasseredine | Lebanon | Nejmeh | 17 |
| 2006–07 | Mohammed Ghaddar | Lebanon | Nejmeh | 15 |
| 2007–08 | Mohammed Ghaddar (2) | Lebanon | Nejmeh | 22 |
| 2008–09 | Salih Sadir | Iraq | Ahed | 27 |
| 2009–10 | Makhete Diop | Senegal | Nejmeh | 23 |
| 2010–11 | Hassan Maatouk | Lebanon | Ahed | 15 |
| 2011–12 | Mohamad Haidar | Lebanon | Safa | 12 |
| 2012–13 | Imad Ghaddar | Lebanon | Chabab Ghazieh | 19 |
| 2013–14 | Adnan Melhem; Lassina Soro | Lebanon; Ivory Coast | Racing Beirut; Racing Beirut | 13 |
| 2014–15 | Lucas Galán | Argentina | Salam Zgharta | 17 |
| 2015–16 | Lucas Galán (2) | Argentina | Ansar | 19 |
| 2016–17 | Abou Bakr Al-Mel | Lebanon | Tripoli | 16 |
| 2017–18 | Elhadji Malick Tall | Senegal | Ansar | 15 |
| 2018–19 | Elhadji Malick Tall (2) | Senegal | Ansar | 19 |
| 2019–20 | The championship was cancelled | | | |
| 2020–21 | Hassan Maatouk (2) | Lebanon | Ansar | 14 |
| 2021–22 | Fadel Antar; Mahmoud Siblini | Lebanon; Lebanon | Shabab Sahel; Nejmeh | 10 |
| 2022–23 | Elhadji Malick Tall (3) | Senegal | Ansar | 22 |
| 2023–24 | Elhadji Malick Tall (4) | Senegal | Ansar | 20 |
| 2024–25 | Hassan Maatouk (3) | Lebanon | Ansar | 17 |
| 2025–26 | Hicham Khalf Allah | Algeria | Ansar | 18 |

== See also ==
- Al-Manar Football Festival
