= Adnan Al Sharqi =

Lebanese footballer and manager (1941–2021)

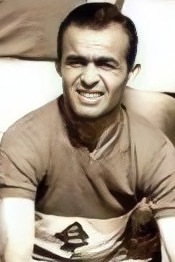
- Al Sharqi with Lebanon at the 1966 Arab Cup

Personal information
- Full name: Adnan Hussein Mekdache
- Date of birth: 15 November 1941
- Place of birth: Beirut, Lebanese Republic
- Date of death: 1 June 2021 (aged 79)
- Place of death: Beirut, Lebanon
- Position: Winger

Youth career
- 1954–1957: Ansar

Senior career*
Years	Team	Apps	(Gls)
1957–1965	Ansar		
1965	Nejmeh		
1966–1967	Salam Achrafieh		
1967	Olympic Club		
1967–1975	Ansar		

International career
1966–1971	Lebanon	10+	(9+)

Managerial career
- 1967–2000: Ansar
- 1974–1976: Lebanon
- 1987–1993: Lebanon
- 2004–2005: Ansar
- 2006–2008: Lebanon
- * Club domestic league appearances and goals

Adnan Hussein Mekdache (Arabic: عدنان حسين مكداش; 15 November 1941 – 1 June 2021), commonly known as Adnan Al Sharqi (Arabic: عدنان الشرقي, lit. 'Adnan the Oriental'), was a Lebanese football player and manager.

After leading Ansar to the Lebanese Premier League for the first time as a player-coach, Al Sharqi coached the club between 1967 and 2000, and during the 2004–05 season. He won 11 league titles in a row, becoming the football manager to have won the most league titles in the world. Al Sharqi also coached the Lebanon national team in various periods spanning between 1974 and 2008.

== Early life ==
Born on 15 November 1941 in Beirut, Lebanon, Al Sharqi grew up in the Tariq El Jdideh district. He used to play football with his friends in the hills and fields in the area.

== Club career ==
Al Sharqi joined Ansar aged 10; they obtained their official license in 1954, and he played for their youth team. A winger, in 1957 he played his first senior match for Ansar aged 15 against Massis in the Lebanese Second Division, and became a first-team player the following year.

In 1965, Al Sharqi was due to join Safa, but joined Nejmeh instead due to bureaucratic issues. He played only four games, two friendlies and two official matches. In 1965, Al Sharqi moved to Cairo, Egypt to study physical education at the Helwan University; he was forced to return to Beirut one year later following the death of his father.

In the first half of the 1966–67 season, Al Sharqi played for Salam Achrafieh. He left the club in January 1967, moving to Olympic Club in Alexandria, Egypt for a short stint. Al Sharqi returned to Ansar in the Second Division as a player-coach prior to the end of the season, leading them to promotion to the Lebanese Premier League for the first time. He remained at Ansar as a player-coach in their first Premier League years, retiring as a player in 1975.

== International career ==
Al Sharqi first played for the Lebanon national team at the 1963 Mediterranean Games in Italy; he was the first footballer playing in the Lebanese Second Division to be called up to the national team. Al Sharqi also represented Lebanon at the 1966 Arab Cup, scoring two goals in a 2–1 win over Kuwait on 5 April 1966.

== Managerial career ==
Al Sharqi coached Ansar between 1967 and 2000, and during the 2004–05 season. He won 11 league titles in a row, becoming the coach to have won the most league titles in the world. He also won eight cup titles, as well as various other domestic cups. Al Sharqi was named AFC Coach of the Month for July 1995.

Al Sharqi also coached the Lebanon national team in various periods spanning between 1974 and 2008, coaching for 11 years. He was Lebanon's coach in their first World Cup qualification campaign, in 1993. After two wins, two losses and four draws, Lebanon finished third in their group and were eliminated.

== Personal life ==
Al Sharqi's brother Mounir helped Ansar obtain their official license in 1954, working as an administrator for the club. His brother Khalil was responsible for the equipment at Nahda. His nickname "Al Sharqi" (Arabic: الشرقي, lit. 'the Oriental') came after his brother Mounir, who had the same nickname as a player.

Al Sharqi was married, and has two children: a son and a daughter.

== Death ==
On 1 June 2021, after spending 45 days in the Military Hospital in Beirut, Al Sharqi died after struggling with cancer. His funeral was held on 2 June at the Beirut Municipal Stadium, Ansar's home stadium, and was attended by a large crowd of Ansar fans.

== Career statistics ==
=== International ===
Scores and results list Lebanon's goal tally first, score column indicates score after each Al Sharqi goal.

List of international goals scored by Adnan Al Sharqi
No.	Date	Venue	Opponent	Score	Result	Competition	Ref.
1	3 April 1966	Al-Kashafa Stadium, Baghdad, Iraq	Bahrain	–	6–1	1966 Arab Cup	
2	5 April 1966	Al-Kashafa Stadium, Baghdad, Iraq	Jordan	–	2–1	1966 Arab Cup	
3	6 April 1966	Al-Kashafa Stadium, Baghdad, Iraq	Kuwait	1–0	2–1	1966 Arab Cup	
4	6 April 1966	Al-Kashafa Stadium, Baghdad, Iraq	Kuwait	–	2–1	1966 Arab Cup	
5	10 April 1966	Al-Kashafa Stadium, Baghdad, Iraq	Libya	–	1–6	1966 Arab Cup	
6	5 June 1966	Stade Léopold Sédar Senghor, Dakar, Senegal	Senegal	–	3–2	Friendly	
7	5 June 1966	Stade Léopold Sédar Senghor, Dakar, Senegal	Senegal	–	3–2	Friendly	
8	6 October 1967	Tokyo National Stadium, Tokyo, Japan	Philippines	–	11–1	1968 Summer Olympics qualification	
9	9 October 1967	Tokyo National Stadium, Tokyo, Japan	Taiwan	–	5–2	1968 Summer Olympics qualification	

== Honours ==
=== Player ===
Ansar

- Lebanese Second Division play-offs: 1966–67

=== Manager ===
Ansar

- Lebanese Premier League: 1987–88, 1989–90, 1990–91, 1991–92, 1992–93, 1993–94, 1994–95, 1995–96, 1996–97, 1997–98, 1998–99
- Lebanese Second Division: 1966–67
- Lebanese FA Cup: 1987–88, 1989–90, 1990–91, 1991–92, 1993–94, 1994–95, 1995–96, 1998–99
- Lebanese Elite Cup: 1997
- Lebanese Federation Cup: 1999
- Lebanese Super Cup: 1996, 1997, 1998, 1999

Individual

- Football manager with most league titles: 11
- AFC Coach of the Month: July 1995
- Lebanese Premier League Best Coach: 1996–97, 1997–98, 1998–99, 2004–05
