= Jamal Taha =

Association football player and coach (born 1966)

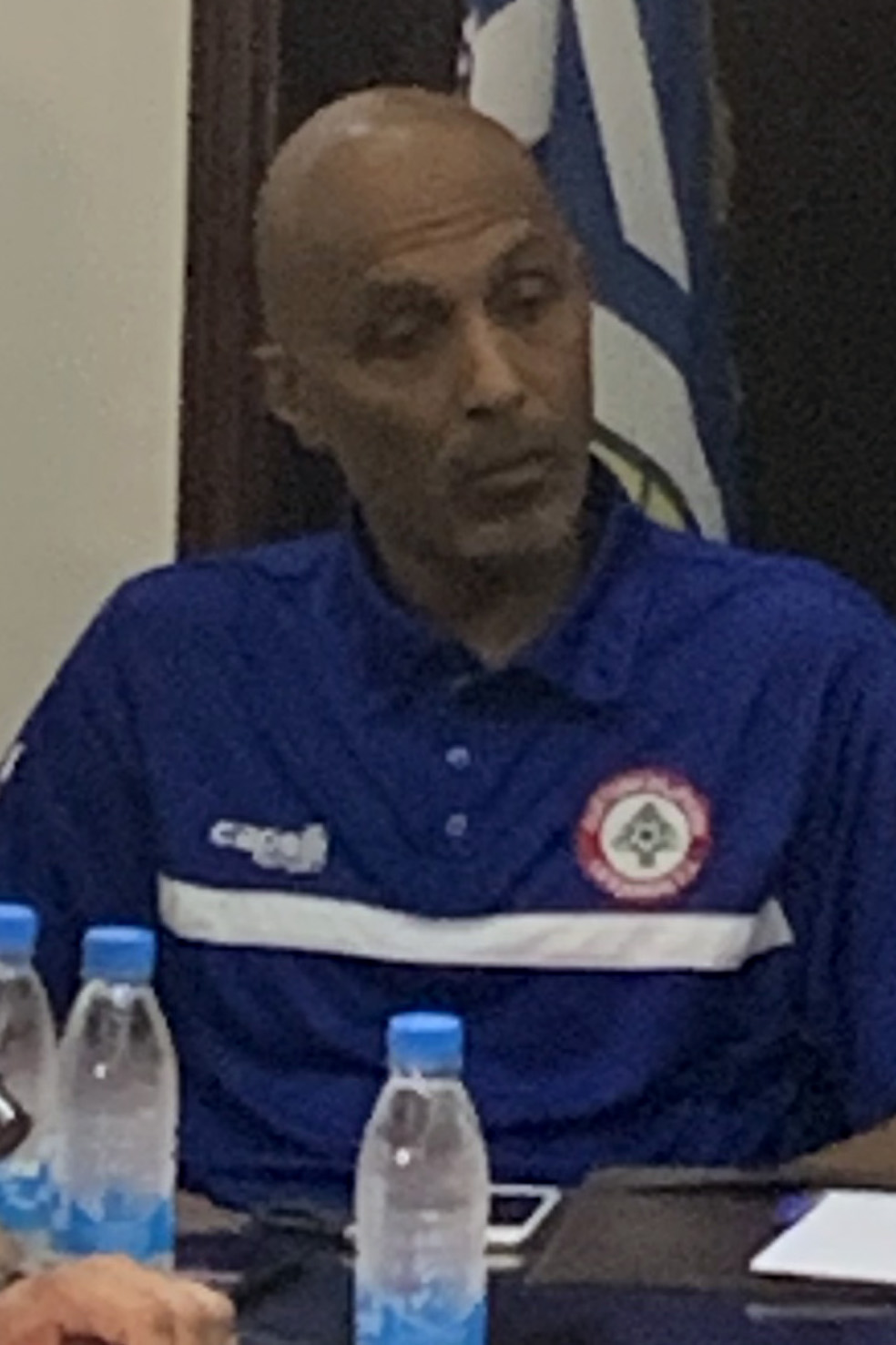
- Taha in 2019

Personal information
- Full name: Jamal Khamis Taha
- Date of birth: 23 November 1966 (age 59)
- Place of birth: Cairo, Egypt
- Position: Midfielder

Youth career
- 1977–1986: Ansar

Senior career*
Years	Team	Apps	(Gls)
1986–2002	Ansar		

International career
1993–2000	Lebanon	71	(12)

Managerial career
- 2005–2006: Ansar (assistant)
- 2006–2008: Ansar
- 2011–2013: Ansar
- 2013–2015: Shabab Sahel
- 2015–2016: Ansar
- 2017–2018: Tadamon Sour
- 2019–2020: Lebanon (assistant)
- 2020–2021: Lebanon
- 2021–2022: Lebanon (assistant)
- 2021–2022: Lebanon U23
- 2022–2023: Ansar
- 2025–2026: Lebanon U23
- 2025: Tadamon Sour
- * Club domestic league appearances and goals

Jamal Khamis Taha (Arabic: جمال خميس طه; born 23 November 1966) is a football coach and former player. Born in Egypt, he played as a midfielder for the Lebanon national team.

Taha made 71 caps for Lebanon between 1993 and 2000, and was their captain at the 2000 Asian Cup.

== Early life ==
Jamal Taha was born in Cairo, Egypt, to an Egyptian father and a Lebanese mother; he obtained Lebanese citizenship through naturalization in 1992 via a presidential decree. Taha joined Ansar's youth team in 1977.

== Club career ==
Nicknamed "the Brown Gazelle" (Arabic: الغزال الأسمر), Taha began his senior career with Ansar in 1986, where he ended his career in 2002. He wore the number 6 on his jersey, and was the club's captain from 1997 onwards.

== International career ==
Taha was the national team's captain during the 2000 AFC Asian Cup in Lebanon.

== Managerial career ==
=== Ansar ===
Taha started out as Adnan Hamad's assistant manager at Ansar during the 2005–06 season; he helped his side win the domestic double (Lebanese Premier League and Lebanese FA Cup). The following season, in 2006–07, Taha was appointed the first manager of Ansar, winning Ansar's second consecutive domestic double. He remained head coach until the end of the 2007–08 season, where he lost the league title to Ahed by one point.

In July 2011, Taha was re-appointed manager of Ansar, staying there until the end of the 2012–13 season. He won the 2011–12 Lebanese FA Cup, and the 2012 Lebanese Super Cup.

=== Shabab Sahel and Tadamon Sour ===
On 10 September 2013, he took charge of Shabab Sahel; he won the Lebanese Challenge Cup in 2014. After two seasons he returned to Ansar, managing them during the 2015–16 season, before resigning after the first league game of the following season in September 2016. In January 2017, Taha became manager of Tadamon Sour until June 2018.

=== Lebanon ===
On 3 June 2019, he was appointed assistant manager of the Lebanon national team under Liviu Ciobotariu's tenure. After one year, on 17 June 2020, the Lebanese Football Association (LFA) decided not to extend Ciobotariu's contract, and appointed Taha as the national team's coach. He became the first Lebanese coach of the national team in almost 12 years, since the appointment of Emile Rustom in November 2008.

Under Taha, Lebanon underperformed in their last three fixtures of the second round of 2022 FIFA World Cup qualification, struggling to overcome Sri Lanka 3–2, and losing against Turkmenistan and South Korea; Lebanon qualified Lebanon to the third round as fifth-best runner-up by virtue of other results going in their favour. Taha's tenure was not extended following the expiration of his one-year contract on 30 June 2021.

=== Lebanon U23 ===
On 27 September 2021, Taha was announced as head coach of the Lebanon national under-23 team.

=== Return to Ansar ===
On 26 June 2022, Taha returned as head coach of Ansar.

=== Return to Lebanon U23 ===
In January 2025, Taha returned as head coach of the Lebanon national under-23 team. He led the team to their first AFC U-23 Asian Cup qualification for the 2026 tournament, where Lebanon lost the first two games against Uzbekistan (3–2) and South Korea (4–2), and won against Iran (1–0), Lebanon's first victory in the AFC U-23 Asian Cup.

=== Return to Tadamon Sour ===
On 22 July 2025, Taha was re-appointed head coach of Tadamon Sour.

== Career statistics ==
=== International ===
Appearances and goals by national team and year
National team	Year	Apps	Goals
Lebanon	1993	8	1
Lebanon	1994	0	0
Lebanon	1995	1	1
Lebanon	1996	7	3
Lebanon	1997	9	1
Lebanon	1998	7	4
Lebanon	1999	2	0
Lebanon	2000	9	1
Total		43	11

Scores and results list Lebanon's goal tally first, score column indicates score after each Taha goal.

List of international goals scored by Jamal Taha
No.	Date	Venue	Opponent	Score	Result	Competition
1	7 May 1993	Bourj Hammoud Stadium, Beirut, Lebanon	India	2–0	2–2	1994 FIFA World Cup qualification
2	6 December 1995	Bourj Hammoud Stadium, Beirut, Lebanon	Slovakia XI	1–1	2–1	Friendly
3	12 May 1996	Bourj Hammoud Stadium, Beirut, Lebanon	Turkmenistan	2–1	3–1	1996 AFC Asian Cup qualification
4	5 December 1996	Beirut Municipal Stadium, Beirut, Lebanon	Georgia	3–2	4–2	Friendly
5	8 December 1996	Beirut Municipal Stadium, Beirut, Lebanon	Georgia	2–1	3–2	Friendly
6	2 February 1997	Bourj Hammoud Stadium, Beirut, Lebanon	Jordan	1–0	1–0	Friendly
7	19 October 1998	Al Nahyan Stadium, Abu Dhabi, United Arab Emirates	Sudan	1–0	1–1	1998 Friendship Tournament
8	30 November 1998	Surat Thani Provincial Stadium, Surat Thani, Thailand	China	1–2	1–4	1998 Asian Games
9	4 December 1998	Surat Thani Provincial Stadium, Surat Thani, Thailand	Cambodia	1–0	5–1	1998 Asian Games
10	4 December 1998	Surat Thani Provincial Stadium, Surat Thani, Thailand	Cambodia	4–1	5–1	1998 Asian Games
11	13 May 2000	Limassol, Cyprus	Jordan	–	1–1	Friendly

=== Managerial ===
As of 23 June 2021

Managerial record by club and tenure
Team	From	To	Record					Ref.
Team	From	To	M	W	D	L	Win %	Ref.
Ansar	December 2006	July 2008	50	34	11	5	68.0	
Ansar	July 2011	June 2013	56	27	16	13	48.2	
Shabab Sahel	September 2013	June 2015	57	19	17	21	33.3	
Ansar	July 2015	September 2016	33	16	10	7	48.5	
Tadamon Sour	January 2017	June 2018	40	15	10	15	37.5	
Lebanon	June 2020	June 2021	7	2	1	4	28.6	
Total			243	113	65	65	46.5	

== Honours ==
=== Player ===
Ansar

- Lebanese Premier League: 1987–88, 1989–90, 1990–91, 1991–92, 1992–93, 1993–94, 1994–95, 1995–96, 1996–97, 1997–98, 1998–99
- Lebanese FA Cup: 1987–88, 1989–90, 1990–91, 1991–92, 1993–94, 1994–95, 1995–96, 1998–99, 2001–02
- Lebanese Elite Cup: 1997, 2000
- Lebanese Federation Cup: 1999, 2000
- Lebanese Super Cup: 1996, 1997, 1998, 1999

Individual

- Lebanese Premier League Team of the Season: 1996–97, 1998–99

=== Manager ===
Ansar

- Lebanese Premier League: 2006–07
- Lebanese FA Cup: 2006–07, 2011–12
- Lebanese Super Cup: 2012

Shabab Sahel

- Lebanese Challenge Cup: 2014

== See also ==
- List of Lebanon international footballers
- List of Lebanon international footballers born outside Lebanon
