= Fadi Alloush =

Lebanese footballer (born 1969)

Personal information
- Date of birth: 1 January 1969 (age 57)
- Place of birth: Beirut, Lebanon
- Height: 1.80 m (5 ft 11 in)
- Position: Striker

Senior career*
Years	Team	Apps	(Gls)
1987–1997	Ansar		(119)
1997–1999	Akhaa Ahli Aley		(3)
1999–2000	Homenmen		(2)
Total			(124)

International career
1988–1996	Lebanon	19	(2)
- * Club domestic league appearances and goals

Fadi Alloush (Arabic: فادي علوش; born 1 January 1969) is a Lebanese former footballer. Nicknamed "the Bulldozer" (Arabic: البلدوزر), Alloush played as a striker for Ansar for most of his career.

He is famous for holding the record for most goals in a Lebanese Premier League campaign, with 32 goals in the 1990–91 season. Alloush was also the top scorer in the Lebanese Premier League, scoring 124 official league goals, before being surpassed by Vardan Ghazaryan.

== Club career ==
=== Ansar ===
In the 1990–91 season Alloush scored 32 goals, becoming the player to have scored the most goals in a single Lebanese Premier League season. The next season Alloush scored 18, missing out on the Golden Boot to Walid Dahrouj who scored 20 goals. In the 1992–93 season he became the top scorer for a second time with 27 goals, becoming the first player to win the Lebanese Premier League Golden Boot more than once.

=== Akhaa Ahli Aley and Homenmen ===
In 1997, Alloush signed for Akhaa Ahli Aley after having played for Ansar for 12 years; he scored two goals for them. Alloush ended his career at Homenmen, scoring two goals and bringing his total league tally to 124 goals.

== International career ==
Alloush represented the Lebanon national team. One of his goals was against Hong Kong in the 1994 World Cup qualifiers, scoring a 79th minute penalty. He also scored a 32nd-minute goal against Kazakhstan in a friendly in 1996.

== Personal life ==
Alloush's daughter, Hiba, also plays football; she represented Lebanon internationally at senior level. As of July 2019, Alloush was working in a Lebanese bank, and was a supervisor for the women's department of the Lebanese Football Association.

== Career statistics ==
=== International ===
Scores and results list Lebanon's goal tally first, score column indicates score after each Alloush goal.

List of international goals scored by Fadi Alloush
No.	Date	Venue	Opponent	Score	Result	Competition	Ref.
1	9 May 1993	Bourj Hammoud Stadium, Beirut, Lebanon	Hong Kong	2–2	2–2	1994 World Cup qualifiers	
2	3 January 1996	Beirut Municipal Stadium, Beirut, Lebanon	Kazakhstan	2–1	2–1	Friendly	

== Honours ==
Ansar

- Lebanese Premier League: 1987–88, 1989–90, 1990–91, 1991–92, 1992–93, 1993–94, 1994–95, 1995–96, 1996–97
- Lebanese FA Cup: 1987–88, 1989–90, 1990–91, 1991–92, 1993–94, 1994–95, 1995–96
- Lebanese Super Cup: 1996

Homenmen

- Lebanese Elite Cup: 1999

Individual

- Lebanese Premier League top goalscorer: 1990–91, 1992–93

Records

- Most Lebanese Premier League goals in a single season: 32 goals

== See also ==
- List of association football families
