= 2014–15 Lebanese Second Division =

Lebanese Second Division
- Season: 2014–15
- Champions: Al Egtmaaey Tripoli

The Lebanese Second Division (Arabic: الدوري اللبناني - الدرجة الثانية) is the second division of Lebanese football. It is controlled by the Federation Libanaise de Football Association. The top two teams qualify for the Lebanese Premier League and replace the relegated teams.

== Table ==
=== League table ===
Pos	Team	Pld	W	D	L	GF	GA	GD	Pts	Promotion or relegation
1	Al Egtmaaey Tripoli (P)	20	13	6	1	35	14	+21	45	Promotion to Lebanese Premier League
2	Hekmeh FC (P)	20	11	5	4	41	26	+15	38	Promotion to Lebanese Premier League
3	Homenetmen Beirut F.C.	20	11	4	5	38	30	+8	37	
4	Al-Ahli SC	20	9	7	4	40	24	+16	34	
5	Al-Riadah wal Adab	20	7	6	7	29	34	−5	27	
6	Al Ahli Nabatieh	20	8	2	10	26	33	−7	26	
7	Islah B.H	20	6	6	8	31	32	−1	24	
8	Al-Mabarrah	20	6	4	10	33	33	0	22	
9	Al-Shabeba Al-Mazraah	20	4	7	9	16	26	−10	19	
10	Al Ommal Tripoli	20	4	6	10	28	36	−8	18	
11	Al-Khoyol FC (R)	20	3	3	14	19	48	−29	12	Relegation to Lebanese Third Division
12	Tadamon Beirut (R)	0	0	0	0	0	0	0	0	Relegation to Lebanese Third Division

Updated to match(es) played on 22 May 2015. Source: FIFA
Rules for classification: 1) Points; 2) Goal difference; 3) Number of goals scored
(P) Promoted; (R) Relegated
