= 1974–75 Lebanese Premier League =

28th season of the Lebanese Premier League

Lebanese Premier League
- Season: 1974–75
- Champions: Nejmeh; 2nd title
- Relegated: Salam Zgharta; Riyada Wal Adab
- Top goalscorer: Jamal Al-Khatib (13 goals)

The 1974–75 Lebanese Premier League season was the 28th season of the Lebanese Premier League, the top Lebanese league for association football clubs in the country, established in 1934.

Nejmeh were the defending champions. They won their second consecutive Lebanese Premier League title, and second overall, scoring 42 goals in 22 games.

== League table ==
Pos	Team	Pld	W	D	L	GF	GA	GD	Pts	Qualification
1	Nejmeh	22	18	4	0	43	4	+39	40	Champions
2	Ansar	22	13	7	2	24	7	+17	33	
3	Safa	22	12	2	8	25	23	+2	26	
4	Tadamon Beirut	22	11	4	7	17	15	+2	26	
5	Racing Beirut	22	9	6	7	14	11	+3	24	
6	Sagesse	22	9	4	9	10	26	−16	22	
7	Homenmen	22	6	6	10	9	22	−13	18	
8	Shabiba Mazraa	22	7	3	12	20	19	+1	17	
9	Homenetmen	22	6	5	11	7	22	−15	17	
10	Istiklal	22	4	8	10	10	29	−19	16	
11	Riada Wal Adab	22	4	3	15	22	12	+10	11	Relegation to Lebanese Second Division
12	Salam Zgharta	22	1	2	19	6	17	−11	4	Relegation to Lebanese Second Division

== Season statistics ==
=== Top goalscorers ===
Rank	Player	Club	Goals
1	(Palestine) (Lebanon) Jamal Al-Khatib	Nejmeh	13
2	(Lebanon) Youssef Al Ghoul	Nejmeh	10
3	(Lebanon) Adel Bissar	Riyada Wal Adab	8
3	(Lebanon) Charles Antonio	Racing	8
3	(Lebanon) Assaad Kalout	Safa	8
4	(Lebanon) Mohamad Al Asta	Ansar	6
4	(Lebanon) Khaled Ghzeil	Tadamon Beirut	6
5	(Lebanon) Adnan Bleik	Ansar	5
5	(Lebanon) Taha Bioumi	Nejmeh	5
5	(Lebanon) Mostafa Al Adlabi	Shabiba Mazraa	5
5	(Lebanon) Adnan Hammoud	Safa	5
5	(Lebanon) Joseph Mashreki	Homenmen	5
