= Jamal Al Haj =

Lebanese footballer and coach (born 1971)

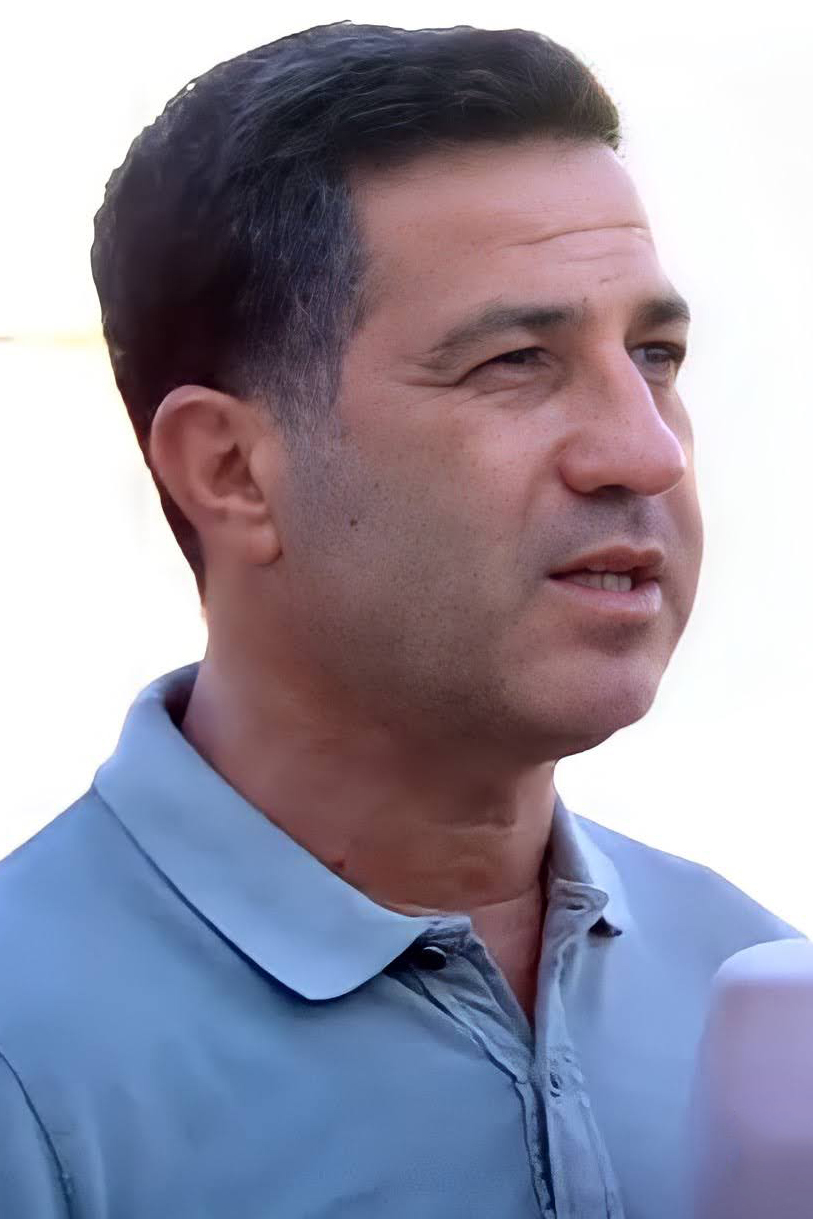
- Al Haj in 2019

Personal information
- Date of birth: 28 August 1971 (age 55)
- Position: Midfielder

Team information
- Current team: Ahed (head coach)

Senior career*
| Years | Team | Apps | (Gls) |
| 1989–2004 | Nejmeh | | |
| 2004 | Ahed | | |

International career
| 1993 | Lebanon | 2 | (0) |

Managerial career
- 2013: Khoyol
- 2017: Nejmeh
- 2020–2021: Lebanon U23
- 2021–2023: Ahed (youth technical director)
- 2024–2025: Ahed
- 2026–: Ahed
- * Club domestic league appearances and goals

Jamal Al Haj (Arabic: جمال الحاج; born 28 August 1971) is a Lebanese football manager and former player who is the head coach of Lebanese Premier League club Ahed.

Al Haj played for Nejmeh as a midfielder, whom he captained, as well as for the Lebanon national team. He was the Lebanese Premier League top scorer in his debut season, in 1989–90, scoring 12 goals. Al Haj also played for Ahed in 2004.

In 2017 he managed Nejmeh, but was fired two months later. Al Haj took charge of the Lebanon national under-23 team between 2020 and 2021. In 2024, he was appointed head coach of Ahed.

== Club career ==
Al Haj made his debut for Nejmeh under Samir Al Adou, during the 1989–90 Lebanese Premier League. In his debut season, Al Haj was the league's top scorer, with 12 goals, above Fadi Alloush and Yasser Mansour from Tadamon Beirut who had scored eight goals each. He remained at Nejmeh for 14 years, captaining them for a certain period, before moving to Ahed in 2004.

== International career ==
Al Haj played for the Lebanon national team.

== Managerial career ==
Al Haj was manager of Lebanese Second Division side Khoyol in 2013. Ahead of the 2017–18 season, Al Haj was appointed head coach of Nejmeh; he was fired two months later. On 12 October 2020, Al Haj was announced head coach of the Lebanon national under-23 team. He resigned on 26 July 2021.

On 3 August 2021, Al Haj was appointed technical director of Ahed's youth sector and remained in this position for two years. Al Hajj returned to Ahed as a head coach, in August 2024 and prior to the 2024–25 Lebanese Premier League. On 9 December 2025, Al Haj resigned as Ahed manager and the board accepted his resignation. On 27 October 2026, Al Haj signed with Ahed for a second stint.

== Personal life ==
Al Haj has two sons, Youssef (b. 1999) and Ali (b. 2001), who both play football.

== Honours ==
=== Player ===
Nejmeh

- Lebanese Premier League: 1999–00, 2001–02, 2003–04
- Lebanese FA Cup: 1996–97, 1997–98
- Lebanese Elite Cup: 1996, 1998, 2001, 2002, 2003
- Lebanese Super Cup: 2000, 2002

Individual

- Lebanese Premier League top goalscorer: 1989–90

== See also ==
- List of association football families
