= Maxime Aoun =

Lebanese footballer (born 2001)

Personal information
- Full name: Maxime Elias Aoun
- Date of birth: 4 March 2001 (age 25)
- Place of birth: Hlaliyeh, Lebanon
- Height: 1.89 m (6 ft 2 in)
- Position: Centre-back

Team information
- Current team: Ansar
- Number: 6

Youth career
- Ansar

Senior career*
Years	Team	Apps	(Gls)
2021–	Ansar	63	(0)
2021–2022	→ Sagesse (loan)	1	(0)

International career^{‡}
2019	Lebanon U19	3	(0)
2022–2023	Lebanon U23	6	(0)
2023	Lebanon	3	(0)
- * Club domestic league appearances and goals as of 12 September 2026 ‡ National team caps and goals as of 12 September 2023

Maxime Elias Aoun (Arabic: مكسيم إلياس عون; born 4 March 2001) is a Lebanese footballer who plays as a centre-back for Lebanese Premier League club Ansar.

Coming through the youth system, Aoun started his senior career at Ansar. After spending the 2021–22 season with Sagesse, Aoun returned to Ansar and won two league titles and one Lebanese FA Cup. Internationally, he made his senior debut for Lebanon at the 2023 SAFF Championship.

== Club career ==
Coming through Ansar's youth system, Aoun was part of the club's first-team setup befor joining Sagesse on loan in July 2021. During the 2021–22 Lebanese Premier League season, he only played once, as a substitute in a 3–0 defeat to Ansar on 18 September 2021.

Following his return from Sagesse, Aoun became a regular member of Ansar's first team, starting in the 2022 Lebanese Elite Cup final against Ahed. Aoun continued playing for Ansar in the following seasons, and was included in the club's squad for the 2025–26 AFC Challenge League, in which Ansar reached the quarter-finals.

== International career ==
Aoun represented Lebanon at under-19 and under-23 levels. In 2019, he was part of the Lebanese squad at the 2019 ISF World School Championship Football, where Lebanon reached the quarter-finals. He was subsequently included in Lebanon's under-19 squad for the 2020 AFC U-19 Championship qualifiers. At under-23 level, Aoun participated in the 2023 WAFF U-23 Championship and the 2024 AFC U-23 Asian Cup qualifiers.

Aoun was first called up to the senior team in May 2023, for a training camp in Turkey. On 25 June 2023, he made his international senior debut in a 4–1 win against Bhutan in the 2023 SAFF Championship. He subsequently started Lebanon's 1–0 win over Maldives on 28 June, as the team advanced to the semi-finals of the tournament.

== Career statistics ==
=== International ===
As of match played 28 June 2023

Appearances and goals by national team and year
National team	Year	Apps	Goals
Lebanon	2023	3	0
Total		3	0

== Honours ==
Ansar

- Lebanese Premier League: 2024–25, 2025–26
- Lebanese FA Cup: 2023–24
