= Ali Al Haj =

Lebanese footballer (born 2001)

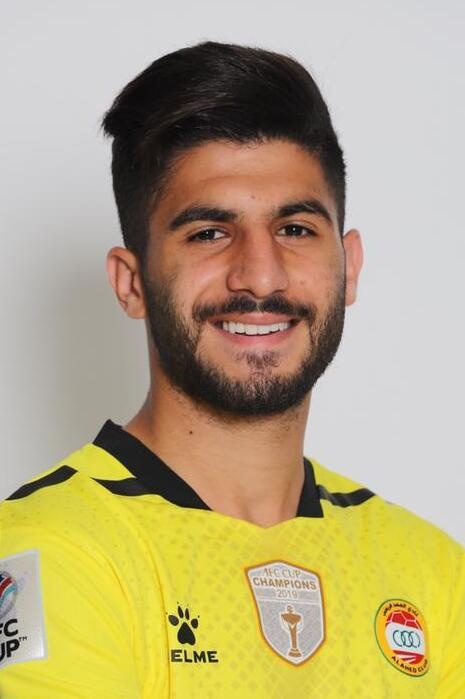
- Al Haj with Ahed in 2021

Personal information
- Full name: Ali Jamal Al Haj
- Date of birth: 2 February 2001 (age 25)
- Place of birth: Beirut, Lebanon
- Height: 1.65 m (5 ft 5 in)
- Position: Forward

Team information
- Current team: Nejmeh
- Number: 7

Youth career
- 2012–2014: ASA
- 2014–2018: Nejmeh

Senior career*
Years	Team	Apps	(Gls)
2017–2020	Nejmeh	13	(1)
2020–2026	Ahed	75	(9)
2026–	Nejmeh	13	(4)

International career^{‡}
2019–2024	Lebanon U23	5	(0)
2022–	Lebanon	15	(1)
- * Club domestic league appearances and goals as of 09:45, 3 August 2026 (UTC) ‡ National team caps and goals as of 11 June 2024

Ali Jamal Al Haj (Arabic: علي جمال الحاج; born 2 February 2001) is a Lebanese footballer who plays as a forward for Lebanese Premier League club Nejmeh and the Lebanon national team.

Coming through the youth system, Al Haj scored on his senior debut for Nejmeh in 2018, becoming the first player born in the 21st century to score in the Lebanese Premier League. In 2020, he joined Ahed with whom he won a league title. Al Haj returned to Nejmeh in 2026.

== Club career ==
=== Nejmeh ===
==== 2017–18: Debut season ====
Al Haj played at youth level for Advanced Soccer Academy (ASA), before moving to Nejmeh's youth sector in 2014. Al Haj's first-team debut for Nejmeh came during the 2017–18 Lebanese Premier League season on 3 March 2018, as a starter away to Safa; he scored a goal from outside the box to help Nejmeh win 3–1. He became the youngest player to score in the league, beating the previous record set by his brother Youssef, as well as the only player to have scored at least a goal in three official national divisions in a single season, having scored 14 and 27 goals respectively in the U17 and U19 leagues.

Al Haj played seven matches in the league (two as a starter and five as a substitute) for a total of 181 minutes, scoring and assisting once. He also scored seven goals for the U17 team in the Lebanese Youth League Final 6 (21 in total), coming second in the League with the Nejmeh youth team. For his performances, Al Haj won the Lebanese Young Player of the Year award for the 2017–18 season.

In July 2018, it was reported that Al Haj had undergone a trial with Austrian Football Bundesliga side Admira Wacker, with a professional contract expected to be signed. However, the transfer fell through and Al Haj remained at Nejmeh.

==== 2018–19: Lebanese Elite Cup win and AFC Cup debut ====
Al Haj played in the 2018–19 Arab Club Champions Cup for Nejmeh, in which he scored the match winner during stoppage time against Al Faisaly of Saudi Arabia in the play-off round on 20 May 2018; the match ended 2–1 for his team. He also scored a goal against Salam Zgharta in the 2018 Lebanese Elite Cup, which he won after Nejmeh beat Akhaa Ahli Aley 1–0 in the final. On 2 December 2018, Al Haj won the Lebanon Football League U19 Championship with Nejmeh U19. In the Lebanese FA Cup round of 16, played on 29 January 2019, he scored a brace in a 6–0 win against Taqadom Anqoun. On 25 February 2019, Al Haj made his debut in the AFC Cup as a 77th-minute substitute against Al-Wehdat of Jordan in a 1–0 away defeat.

Al Haj ended his season with six appearances in the league and four in the AFC Cup, and scored two goals in the Lebanese FA Cup.

==== 2019–20: Cancelled season ====
Al Haj played two games for Nejmeh in the 2019–20 Lebanese Premier League; on 20 September 2019 he played against cross-city rivals Ansar, and on 27 September he played against Tadamon Sour, on both instances as a substitute. However, the league was cancelled due to financial and political issues in Lebanon and the COVID-19 pandemic.

=== Ahed ===
==== 2020–21: Debut season ====
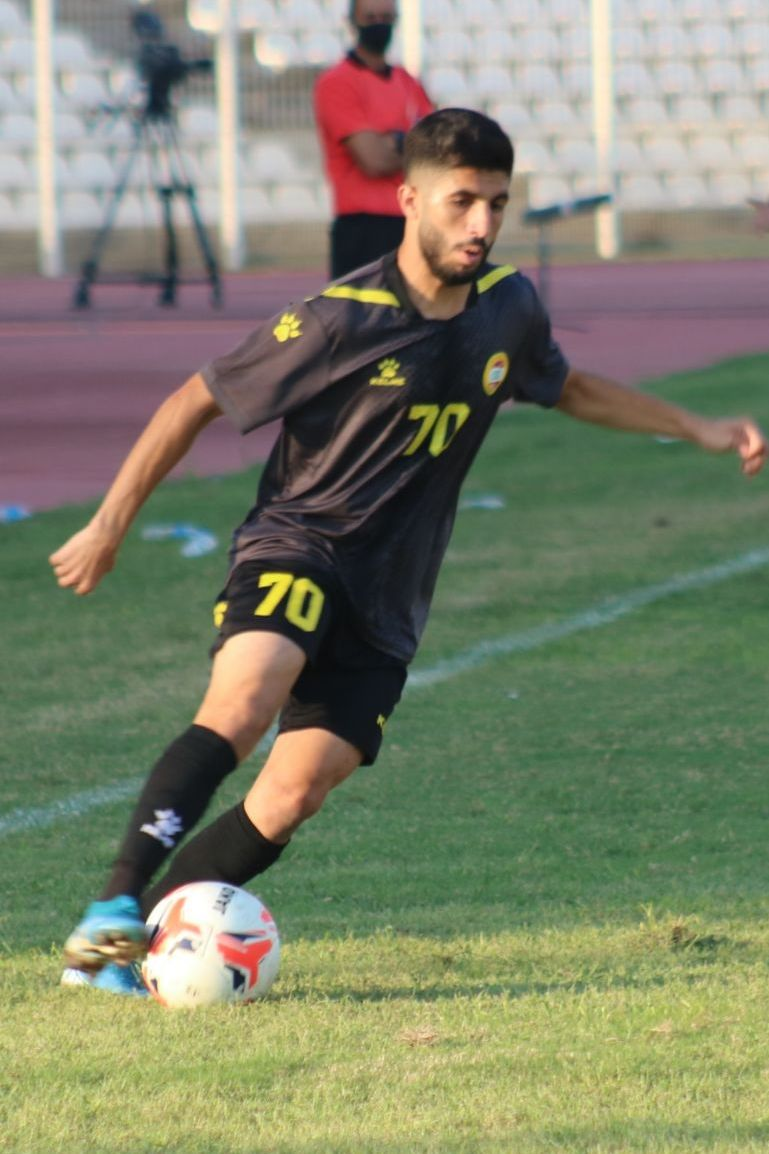
Al Haj with Ahed in 2020

On 13 June 2020, Al Haj signed for AFC Cup title-holders Ahed on a five-year contract in a free transfer deal. He made his debut on 4 October 2020, in the first matchday of the 2020–21 Lebanese Premier League; Ahed won 3–2, with Al Haj playing 76 minutes. He finished the season with 12 league games. On 27 May 2021, Al Haj assisted Nour Mansour's header through a corner kick, helping Ahed beat Al-Muharraq of Bahrain 2–1 in the 2021 AFC Cup group stage.

==== 2021–2023: ACL injury and league title ====
On 31 July 2021, Al Haj sustained an ACL injury during Ahed's 2021 Lebanese Elite Cup final game against his former team Nejmeh. He returned to action for Ahed in the first matchday of the 2022–23 season, against Akhaa Ahli Aley on 4 September 2022. He had played his previous league game 16 months prior, also against Akhaa, on 23 April 2021.

Al Haj scored his first goal for Ahed on 4 March 2023, in a 2–0 win against Shabab Sahel. On 24 April, he scored a penalty against Sahel in the 2022–23 Lebanese FA Cup semi-finals, to help Ahed progress to the final. Ahed played Nejmeh in the final on 30 April. Despite converting his penalty in the penalty-shootouts, Ahed lost the encounter. Al Haj established himself as a starter during the 2022–23 season, playing 20 league games and scoring once.

==== 2024–2026 ====
On 24 May 2025, Al Haj scored his first career hat-trick in Ahed's 3–0 win against Tadamon Sour in the 2024–25 Lebanese Premier League. On 21 June, he scored from a free kick in a 2–2 draw against Sagesse before suffering an ankle injury that forced him off the pitch.

=== Return to Nejmeh ===
In January 2026, Al Haj returned to Nejmeh.

== International career ==
=== Youth ===
On 30 January 2019, Al Haj was called up for the Lebanon national under-23 team for a trial in view of the 2020 AFC U23 qualification, and was called up for the final 23 man squad on 15 March 2019. Al Haj played twice in the tournament, against the United Arab Emirates on 22 March and Maldives on 26 March, in both instances as a substitute.

=== Senior ===
Al Haj was first called up to the Lebanon senior national team by coach Aleksandar Ilić for a training camp in Bnachii, Zgharta between 19 and 27 September 2022. He made his debut on 30 December 2022, starting in a friendly game against the United Arab Emirates in Dubai. On 25 June 2023, Al Haj scored his first senior international goal in a 4–1 win against Bhutan in the 2023 SAFF Championship. In December 2023, Al Haj was included in the Lebanese squad for the 2023 AFC Asian Cup.

== Style of play ==
A skilled forward, Al Haj can play on the flanks as a winger on either side, as well as centrally, both behind the striker and as a centre-forward. He has been described as being more individually talented than his father, Jamal, who also played as a footballer at Nejmeh and the Lebanon national team. In 2020, Al Haj was cited by Lebanon national team captain Hassan Maatouk as the most promising talent in Lebanon.

== Personal life ==
Al Haj's father and agent Jamal captained and managed Nejmeh, while his older brother Youssef also plays football.

== Career statistics ==
=== International ===
As of match played 11 June 2024

Appearances and goals by national team and year
National team	Year	Apps	Goals
Lebanon	2022	1	0
Lebanon	2023	11	1
Lebanon	2024	3	0
Total		15	1

Scores and results list Lebanon's goal tally first, score column indicates score after each Al Haj goal.

List of international goals scored by Ali Al Haj
No.	Date	Venue	Opponent	Score	Result	Competition
1	25 June 2023	Sree Kanteerava Stadium, Bangalore, India	Bhutan	2–0	4–1	2023 SAFF Championship

== Honours ==
Nejmeh

- Lebanese FA Cup: 2025–26
- Lebanese Elite Cup: 2018
- Lebanese Premier League U19: 2018–19

Ahed

- Lebanese Premier League: 2022–23
- Lebanese Federation Cup: 2023
- Lebanese FA Cup runner-up: 2022–23, 2023–24
- Lebanese Super Cup runner-up: 2023
- AFC Cup runner-up: 2023–24

Individual

- Lebanese Young Player of the Year: 2017–18

Records

- First player born in the 21st century to score in the Lebanese Premier League
- First player to score in three Lebanese national divisions in a single season (U17, U19, and senior)

== See also ==
- List of association football families
