= Lucas Galán =

Argentine footballer (born 1988)

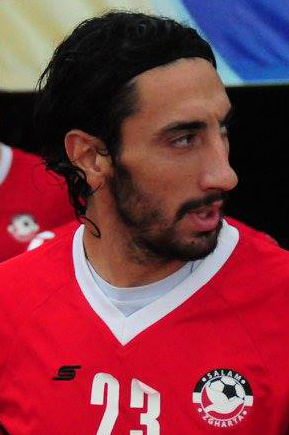
- Galán with Salam Zgharta in 2014

Personal information
- Full name: Lucas Matiás Galán
- Date of birth: 22 June 1988 (age 38)
- Place of birth: Guaymallén, Mendoza, Argentina
- Height: 1.84 m (6 ft 0 in)
- Position: Forward

Youth career
- Leonardo Murialdo
- Godoy Cruz
- Racing
- Universidad de Chile

Senior career*
Years	Team	Apps	(Gls)
2005–2007	Deportivo Guaymallén		
2007–2008	Gimnasia y Esgrima		
2008–2009	Del Bono		
2009–2010	Juventud Alianza	29	(9)
2010	Atenas	15	(2)
2011	Del Bono		
2011–2012	Atlético Policial	20	(0)
2012–2013	Sportivo Peñarol	11	(3)
2013	Deportivo Coatepeque	14	(6)
2013–2014	Kallithea	22	(8)
2014–2015	Salam Zgharta	20	(17)
2015–2016	Ansar	21	(19)
2016–2017	Al-Tai	14	(6)
2017	Platense	4	(0)
2018	Shabab Arabi	7	(1)
Total		208	(87)
- * Club domestic league appearances and goals

Lucas Matías Galán (born 22 June 1988) is an Argentine former professional footballer who played as a forward. A left-footed forward, Galán was known for his physical presence and heading.

Starting his career in Argentina, Galán moved to Guatemala in 2013, at Deportivo Coatepeque, helping them gain promotion to the Liga Nacional de Fútbol. Three months later he joined Greek side Kallithea, before moving to Lebanon in 2014, first at Salam Zgharta then at Ansar. Galán won the Golden Boot in both seasons in the Lebanese Premier League.

In 2016 he joined Saudi side Al-Tai, before returning to his native Argentina at Club Atlético Platense. In 2018 Galán ended his career in Lebanon at Shabab Arabi.

== Early life ==
Galán was born on 22 June 1988 in Guaymallén, Mendoza, Argentina. He started his youth career at Leonardo Murialdo, before joining local club Godoy Cruz. Galán then joined the youth club Racing, playing alongside players such as Gabriel Mercado, Maximiliano Moralez, and Sergio Romero. He also had an experience at Universidad de Chile.

== Career ==
Galán began his senior career aged 17 at Deportivo Guaymallén in the Liga Mendocina de Fútbol, winning the league title in 2005. In 2007 he joined Gimnasia y Esgrima de Mendoza in the Torneo Argentino A, before playing in the Torneo Argentino B with Del Bono in 2008. He then played for Juventud Alianza in 2009, and Atenas in 2010, before returning to Del Bono in 2011. Galán joined Atlético Policial in 2011, then Sportivo Peñarol in 2012.

Galán's first experience abroad was in 2013, at Deportivo Coatepeque in Guatemala. He helped his side gain promotion to the Liga Nacional de Fútbol, scoring six goals in 14 games. After six months in Guatemala, Galán signed for Football League Greece (second-tier) club Kallithea, where he made 22 appearances, scoring eight goals and assisting three.

On 10 September 2014, Galán signed for Lebanese Premier League side Salam Zgharta. With 17 league goals in 20 appearances, he won the 2014–15 Golden Boot. On 4 July 2015, Galán moved to Ansar on a two-year contract. For the second time in a row, Galán won the Lebanese Golden Boot, for the 2015–16 season, with 19 goals in 21 games. He was also included in the Lebanese Premier League Team of the Season.

In 2016 he moved to Al-Tai in Saudi Arabia, scoring six goals in 14 games, before moving back to Argentina in 2017, at Club Atlético Platense. In January 2018, Galán returned to Lebanon, signing for Shabab Arabi; he retired following an ACL injury.

== Honours ==
Deportivo Guaymallén

- Liga Mendocina de Fútbol: 2005

Deportivo Coatepeque

- Primera División de Ascenso: 2013

Individual

- Lebanese Premier League Team of the Season: 2015–16
- Lebanese Premier League top scorer: 2014–15, 2015–16
