= Mahmoud Hammoud =

Mahmoud Hammoud may refer to:

- Mahmoud Hammoud (politician) (1935–2018), Lebanese politician and diplomat
- Mahmoud Hammoud (footballer) (born 1964), Lebanese football player and coach
