= 1990–91 Lebanese Premier League =

31st season of the Lebanese Premier League

Lebanese Premier League
- Season: 1990–91
- Champions: Ansar; 3rd title
- Relegated: Shaala; Shabiba Mazraa; Fityan
- Matches: 182
- Goals: 504 (2.77 per match)
- Top goalscorer: Fadi Alloush (32 goals)

The 1990–91 Lebanese Premier League season was the 31st season of the Lebanese Premier League, the top Lebanese professional league for association football clubs in the country, established in 1934.

Ansar, who were the defending champions, won their third consecutive—and overall—Lebanese Premier League title.

== League table ==
Pos	Team	Pld	W	D	L	GF	GA	GD	Pts	Qualification
1	Ansar	26	23	3	0	67	8	+59	49	Champions
2	Safa	26	16	5	5	55	35	+20	37	
3	Salam Zgharta	26	14	7	5	53	28	+25	35	
4	Riada Wal Adab	26	13	7	6	37	21	+16	33	
5	Nejmeh	26	10	8	8	42	26	+16	28	
6	Tadamon Sour	26	11	6	9	33	26	+7	28	
7	Harakat Shabab	26	8	12	6	23	22	+1	28	
8	Akhaa Ahli Aley	26	7	11	8	35	39	−4	25	
9	Tadamon Beirut	26	7	10	9	31	30	+1	24	
10	Shabab Sahel	26	7	9	10	26	26	0	23	
11	Arz	26	8	7	11	30	46	−16	23	
12	Fityan	26	5	6	15	23	41	−18	16	Relegation to Lebanese Second Division
13	Shabiba Mazraa	26	2	6	18	34	67	−33	10	Relegation to Lebanese Second Division
14	Shaala	26	2	1	23	15	89	−74	5	Relegation to Lebanese Second Division

Source: RSSSF
