= 1992–93 Lebanese Premier League =

33rd season of the Lebanese Premier League

Lebanese Premier League
- Season: 1992–93
- Champions: Ansar; 5th title
- Relegated: Ahli Saida; Majd; Egtmaaey; Tadamon Beirut; Harakat Shabab
- Matches: 264
- Goals: 666 (2.52 per match)
- Top goalscorer: Fadi Alloush (27 goals)

The 1992–93 Lebanese Premier League season was the 33rd season of the Lebanese Premier League, the top Lebanese league for association football clubs in the country, established in 1934.

Ansar, who were the defending champions, won their fifth consecutive—and overall—Lebanese Premier League title.

== League table ==
Pos	Team	Pld	W	D	L	GF	GA	GD	Pts	Qualification
1	Ansar	32	24	6	2	79	17	+62	54	Champions
2	Safa	32	16	11	5	57	28	+29	43	
3	Nejmeh	32	18	7	7	59	41	+18	43	
4	Racing Beirut	32	10	17	5	37	31	+6	37	
5	Homenmen	32	13	10	9	47	33	+14	36	
6	Riada Wal Adab	32	12	11	9	36	35	+1	35	
7	Bourj	32	9	16	7	38	30	+8	34	
8	Tadamon Sour	32	11	10	11	50	52	−2	32	
9	Ahli Sarba	32	9	13	10	26	34	−8	31	
10	Homenetmen (Note: Homenetmen were deducted 4 points.)	32	10	14	8	45	36	+9	30	
11	Shabab Sahel	32	7	16	9	29	32	−3	30	
12	Salam Zgharta	32	8	14	10	39	48	−9	30	
13	Harakat Shabab	32	7	16	9	23	32	−9	30	Relegation to Lebanese Second Division
14	Tadamon Beirut	32	6	11	15	23	52	−29	23	Relegation to Lebanese Second Division
15	Egtmaaey	32	3	13	16	22	49	−27	19	Relegation to Lebanese Second Division
16	Majd	32	3	12	17	34	54	−20	18	Relegation to Lebanese Second Division
17	Ahli Saida	32	3	9	20	22	62	−40	15	Relegation to Lebanese Second Division

Source: RSSSF

== Top scorers ==
Rank	Player	Club	Goals
1	(Lebanon) Fadi Alloush	Ansar	27
2	(Lebanon) Mahmoud Hammoud	Nejmeh	21
3	(Liberia) Emmanuel Harris	Safa	16
4	(Syria) Radwan Ajam	Salam Zgharta	15
5	(Lebanon) Issam Moussa	Tadamon Sour	13
6	(Lebanon) Mohamad Messelmani	Ansar	12
6	(Armenia) Vitaliy Agasian	Homenmen	12
8	(Armenia) Seyran Osipov	Homenmen	11
8	(Armenia) Vartan Ghazarian	Homenetmen	11
8	(Lebanon) Fadel Sabbagh	Majed	11
8	(Lebanon) Elie Jreij	Racing	11
