= Islam Batran =

Palestinian footballer (born 1994)

Personal information
- Full name: Islam Mohammad Moussa Batran
- Date of birth: 1 October 1994 (age 32)
- Place of birth: Hebron, Palestine
- Height: 1.76 m (5 ft 9 in)
- Positions: Winger; attacking midfielder

Team information
- Current team: Safa
- Number: 21

Senior career*
Years	Team	Apps	(Gls)
2012–2013	Shabab Yatta		
2013–2018	Ahli Al-Khaleel		
2016–2017	→ Wadi Degla (loan)	3	(0)
2018–2020	Al-Jazeera		
2020	Al-Hussein		
2020–2022	Hilal Al-Quds		
2022–2023	Nongbua Pitchaya	23	(3)
2023–2024	Al Ahli Tripoli		
2024–	Safa	18	(12)

International career^{‡}
2015–2017	Palestine U23	6	(4)
2016–	Palestine	33	(5)
- * Club domestic league appearances and goals as of 24 April 2024 ‡ National team caps and goals as of 11 June 2024

Islam Mohammad Moussa Batran (Arabic: إسلام محمد موسى البطران; born 1 October 1994) is a Palestinian professional footballer who plays as a winger or attacking midfielder for Lebanese Premier League club Safa and the Palestine national team.

== Club career ==
Batran signed a one-year contract with Egyptian Premier League side Wadi Degla in August 2016, following a successful trial.

In August 2024, Batran joined Safa in the Lebanese Premier League. He scored a hat-trick against Bourj on 6 February 2025, helping Safa win 4–0.

== International career ==
Batran scored his first senior international goal in a 2–1 loss against Iraq, on 2 August 2019.

== Career statistics ==
=== International goals ===
As of 5 September 2019

International goals by date, venue, cap, opponent, score, result and competition
No.	Date	Venue	Cap	Opponent	Score	Result	Competition
1	2 August 2019	Karbala International Stadium, Karbala, Iraq	12	Iraq	1–0	1–2	2019 WAFF Championship
2	11 August 2019	Karbala International Stadium, Karbala, Iraq	14	Syria	1–1	4–3	2019 WAFF Championship
3	5 September 2019	Faisal Al-Husseini International Stadium, Al-Ram, Palestine	15	Uzbekistan	2–0	2–0	2022 FIFA World Cup qualification
4	24 June 2021	Jassim bin Hamad Stadium, Doha, Qatar	22	Comoros	5–1	5–1	2021 FIFA Arab Cup qualification
