= Walid Dahrouj =

Lebanese footballer (born 1965)

Personal information
- Date of birth: 1965 (age 60–61)
- Place of birth: Shheem, Lebanon
- Position: Striker

Senior career*
Years	Team	Apps	(Gls)
–1984	Ahli Saida		
1984–2002	Safa		

International career
1988–1998	Lebanon	10	(0)
- * Club domestic league appearances and goals

Walid Dahrouj (Arabic: وليد دحروج; born 1965) is a Lebanese former footballer who played as striker. He played nearly 20 years for Safa, and represented Lebanon internationally.

== Club career ==
Dahrouj started his career at Ahli Saida, before moving to Safa in 1984. In 1991–92 he was Lebanese Premier League top goalscorer with 20 goals. Dahrouj remained at Safa until his retirement in 2002.

== International career ==
Dahrouj represented Lebanon internationally during the 1990s, playing at the 1994 FIFA World Cup qualifiers and the 1998 Arab Nations Cup.

== Personal life ==
Born in 1965, Dahrouj has two daughters: Majida (born 2002), named after his mother, and May (born 2006/2007). He is a supporter of Spanish club Real Madrid.

As of 2015, Dahrouj was working at the duty-free shop of the Beirut–Rafic Hariri International Airport and living in his hometown Shheem.

== Honours ==
Safa

- Lebanese FA Cup: 1986–87; runner-up: 1970–71, 1989–90, 1990–91, 1994–95, 1999–2000

Individual

- Lebanese Premier League top goalscorer: 1991–92
