= 1994–95 Lebanese Premier League =

Lebanese Premier League
- Season: 1994–95
- Champions: Ansar; 7th title
- Relegated: Salam Zgharta; Ahli Saida
- Top goalscorer: Vitaliy Agasyan (16 goals)

The 1994–95 Lebanese Premier League season was the 35th season of the Lebanese Premier League, the top Lebanese professional league for association football clubs in the country, established in 1934.

Ahli Saida and Harakat Shabab joined as the promoted clubs from the 1993–94 Lebanese Second Division. They replaced Shabab Sahel and Riada Wal Adab who were relegated to the 1994–95 Lebanese Second Division. Ansar, the defending champions, won their seventh consecutive—and overall—Lebanese Premier League title.

== League table ==
| Pos | Team | Pld | W | D | L | GF | GA | GD | Pts | Qualification |
|---|---|---|---|---|---|---|---|---|---|---|
| 1 | Ansar | 26 | 18 | 7 | 1 | 47 | 13 | +34 | 61 | |
| 2 | Nejmeh | 26 | 15 | 9 | 2 | 33 | 16 | +17 | 54 | |
| 3 | Homentmen | 26 | 15 | 6 | 5 | 38 | 22 | +16 | 51 | |
| 4 | Homenmen | 26 | 12 | 11 | 3 | 37 | 22 | +15 | 47 | |
| 5 | Tadamon Sour | 26 | 11 | 5 | 10 | 38 | 31 | +7 | 38 | |
| 6 | Sagesse | 26 | 7 | 14 | 5 | 28 | 26 | +2 | 35 | |
| 7 | Akhaa Ahli Aley | 26 | 8 | 7 | 11 | 25 | 24 | +1 | 31 | |
| 8 | Safa | 26 | 6 | 12 | 8 | 33 | 30 | +3 | 30 | |
| 9 | Bourj | 26 | 6 | 11 | 9 | 21 | 26 | −5 | 29 | |
| 10 | Racing Beirut | 26 | 6 | 10 | 10 | 22 | 29 | −7 | 28 | |
| 11 | Harakat Shabab | 26 | 6 | 7 | 13 | 36 | 55 | −19 | 25 | |
| 12 | Ahli Sarba | 26 | 6 | 6 | 14 | 25 | 40 | −15 | 24 | |
| 13 | Salam Zgharta | 26 | 6 | 2 | 18 | 31 | 54 | −23 | 20 | Relegation to Lebanese Second Division |
| 14 | Ahli Saida | 26 | 2 | 9 | 15 | 13 | 39 | −26 | 15 | Relegation to Lebanese Second Division |

Source: rsssf.com

== Top scorers ==
| Rank | Player | Club | Goals |
|---|---|---|---|
| 1 | (Armenia) Vitaliy Agasyan | Homenmen | 16 |
| 2 | (Sierra Leone) Mohamed Kallon | Tadamon Sour | 15 |
| 3 | (Lebanon) Chaaban Hamadeh | Harakat Shabab | 14 |
| 4 | (Romania) Vasile Caciureac | Sagesse | 13 |
| 5 | (Liberia) Emmanuel Harris | Safa | 12 |
| 5 | (Lebanon) Fadi Alloush | Ansar | 12 |
| 5 | (Lebanon) Vardan Ghazaryan | Homenetmen | 12 |
| 5 | (Armenia) Ashot Parsekian | Homenetmen | 12 |
| 9 | (Trinidad and Tobago) David Nakhid | Ansar | 10 |
| 9 | (Lebanon) Salah Nasser | Ahli Sarba | 10 |
