= Mahmoud Hammoud (footballer) =

Lebanese footballer and manager (1964–2021)

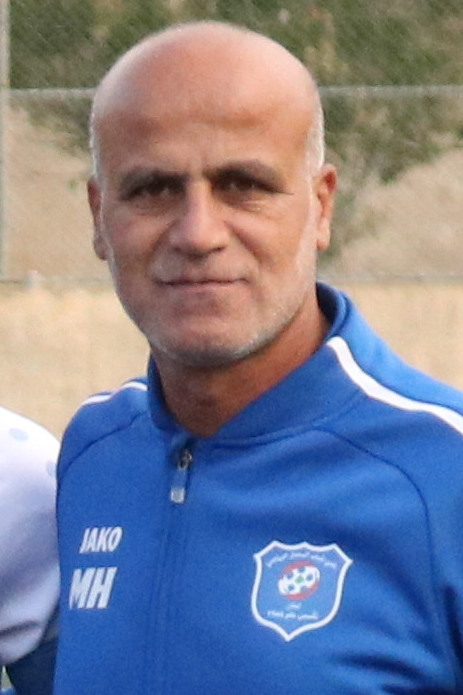
- Hammoud with Shabab Sahel in 2020

Personal information
- Full name: Mahmoud Hassan Hammoud
- Date of birth: 3 July 1964
- Place of birth: Kfar Melki, Lebanon
- Date of death: 4 December 2021 (aged 57)
- Place of death: Haret Hreik, Beirut, Lebanon
- Position: Striker

Youth career
- 1979–1983: Nejmeh

Senior career*
Years	Team	Apps	(Gls)
1983–1996	Nejmeh		(90+)
1988–1989	→ Al-Khor (loan)		

International career
- Lebanon U20
- Lebanon U23
1988–1989	Lebanon	8	(3)

Managerial career
- 1998–2002: Ahed
- 2003–2004: Lebanon U23
- 2003: Lebanon
- 2004: Lebanon
- 2006–2008: Shabab Sahel
- 2008–2011: Ahed
- 2011–2013: Shabab Sahel
- 2013–2014: Akhaa Ahli Aley
- 2014–2016: Ahed
- 2016–2017: Nabi Chit
- 2017–2021: Shabab Sahel
- * Club domestic league appearances and goals

Mahmoud Hassan Hammoud (Arabic: محمود حسن حمود; 3 July 1964 – 4 December 2021), also known as Hajj Mahmoud Hammoud (Arabic: الحاج محمود حمود), was a Lebanese football player and manager.

Hammoud played as a striker for Nejmeh and the Lebanon national team during the 1980s and 1990s. He coached various Lebanese Premier League sides, most notably Ahed and Shabab Sahel, as well as the Lebanon national team

== Club career ==
Having joined Nejmeh's youth system in 1979, Hammoud was promoted to the first team in 1983. He joined Qatari side Al-Khor in 1988 for one season, following the 1988 Arab Nations Cup. Hammoud was the 1993–94 Lebanese Premier League top scorer with Nejmeh, scoring 15 goals during the season. In 1994, he was already captain of his team. The forward retired in 1996 having won two Lebanese FA Cups, in 1986–87 and 1988–89. During his career, Hammoud scored over 90 goals for Nejmeh.

== International career ==
Hammoud played for both the Lebanon national under-20 and under-23 teams. Making his debut for the national team in 1985, Hammoud represented Lebanon at the 1988 Arab Cup.

== Managerial career ==
Hammoud began his coaching career at newly promoted Ahed, during the 1998–99 season. After working as an assistant coach for the Lebanon national team twice, Hammoud became the head coach of the Lebanon national under-23 team during the 2004 Summer Olympics qualifiers, between 2003 and 2004.

He took charge of the Lebanon national team for a short period of time in December 2003. He was reappointed manager on 8 February 2004, before ending his managerial stint with Lebanon on 3 July of the same year.

In October 2013, Hammoud became coach of Akhaa Ahli Aley, staying there until the end of the season. After helping Shabab Sahel to a historic third place in the 2020–21 Lebanese Premier League, Hammoud's contract was renewed for a further season.

== Death ==
On 6 November 2021, Hammoud tested positive for COVID-19, amidst the pandemic in Lebanon. He was sent to Sahel General Hospital in Haret Hreik, Beirut. Hammoud died from the virus on 4 December 2021, at the age of 57.

== Career statistics ==
=== International ===
Scores and results list Lebanon's goal tally first, score column indicates score after each Hammoud goal.

List of international goals scored by Mahmoud Hammoud
No.	Date	Venue	Opponent	Score	Result	Competition	Ref.
1	11 April 1988	Al-Hamadaniah Stadium, Aleppo, Syria	Syria	1–0	1–2	1988 Arab Cup qualification	
2	13 July 1988	Amman International Stadium, Amman, Jordan	Saudi Arabia	1–0	1–0	1988 Arab Cup	
3	17 July 1988	Amman International Stadium, Amman, Jordan	Tunisia	1–1	1–1	1988 Arab Cup	

== Honours ==
=== Player ===
Nejmeh

- Lebanese FA Cup (2) : 1986–87, 1988–89

Individual

- Lebanese Premier League top goalscorer: 1993–94

=== Manager ===
Ahed

- Lebanese Premier League (3) : 2009–10, 2010–11,2014–15
- Lebanese FA Cup (3) : 2004-05, 2008-09, 2010-11
- Lebanese Elite Cup (4) : 2010, 2011, 2013, 2015
- Lebanese Super Cup (4) : 2004, 2010, 2011, 2015

Shabab Sahel

- Lebanese Elite Cup: 2019

Individual

- Lebanese Premier League Best Coach: 2009–10, 2010–11
