= 2004–05 Lebanese Premier League =

Lebanese Premier League
- Season: 2004–05
- Champions: Al-Nejmeh
- Runner up: Al-Ansar
- Relegated: La Sagesse; Shabab Al-Sahel; Al-Ahli Akha'a
- Top goalscorer: Mohammad Kassas (20)

The 2004–05 season of the Lebanese Premier League was the 44th season of Top-Flight Professional League Football (soccer) in Lebanon. This season featured 11 clubs once more from across the nation. Two of the competing teams were eligible for qualifying for international competitions(AFC Cup for 1st Position and FA Cup Winners while 2nd and 3rd enter the Arab Champions League) while the bottom 3 would be relegated to make way for 2 teams from the 2004–05 Second Division for 2005–06 season. This Due to the league being reduced to 10 teams for the 2005–06 season.

== Final table ==
Pos	Team	Pld	W	D	L	GF	GA	GD	Pts	Qualification or relegation
1	Al-Nejmeh	20	13	5	2	56	18	+38	44	AFC Cup Group Stage and Arab Champions League
2	Al-Ansar	20	13	5	2	35	17	+18	44	Arab Champions League
3	Al-Ahed	20	11	3	6	37	22	+15	36	AFC Cup Group Stage (FA Cup Winners)
4	Olympic Beirut	20	9	6	5	33	22	+11	33	
5	Safa	20	7	7	6	26	23	+3	28	
6	Al-Tadamon Tyre	20	6	6	8	17	26	−9	24	
7	Al-Mabarrah	20	6	6	8	18	28	−10	24	
8	Al-Rayyan	20	5	6	9	19	28	−9	21	
9	Al-Hikma	20	6	3	11	12	32	−20	21	Relegated to Lebanese Second Division
10	Shabab Al-Sahel	20	3	7	10	23	31	−8	16	Relegated to Lebanese Second Division
11	Al Akhaa Al Ahli	20	1	6	13	16	45	−29	3 (Note: Al-Akhaa Al Ahli deducted 6 points for failing to have their Junior side compete domestically)	Relegated to Lebanese Second Division

== Top scorers ==
Correct as of 28 June 2005.

Rank	Name	Club	Goals
1	(Lebanon) Mohammad Kassas	Safa	17
2	(Lebanon) Moussa Hojeij	Al-Mabarrah	11
2	(Lebanon) Faisal Antar	Al-Mabarrah	9
3	(Lebanon) Mohmoud Chahoud	Al-Mabarrah	8
3	(Brazil) Zé Carlos	Al-Hikma	8
