= Tadamon SC Beirut =

Lebanese association football club

Tadamon Beirut
- Full name: Tadamon Sporting Club Beirut
- Founded: 15 June 1961; 64 years ago
- Dissolved: 2014; 11 years ago

Tadamon Sporting Club Beirut (Arabic: نادي التضامن الرياضي بيروت, lit. 'Solidarity Sporting Club Beirut') was a football club based in Beirut, Lebanon.

== History ==
Founded on 15 June 1961, Tadamon Beirut have participated in the Lebanese Premier League numerous times. In 1986–87 they reached the final of the Lebanese FA Cup, losing 2–0 to Nejmeh thanks to a brace by Mahmoud Hammoud. In the 1991–92 season, Tadamon Beirut finished in first place in Group A, losing the championship play-off to Ansar 4–1 on aggregate. They last participated in the Lebanese Premier League during the 1992–93 season.

In 2006 the club was playing in the Lebanese Fourth Division. They won the Lebanese Third Division during the 2012–13 season, beating Shabiba Mazraa 2–0 after extra time in the promotion play-off. Tadamon Beirut withdrew from the Lebanese Second Division in 2014–15, and were dissolved.

== Honours ==
- Lebanese Third Division
  - Champions (1): 2012–13
- Lebanese FA Cup
  - Runners-up (1): 1986–87
