= 2024–25 Lebanese Premier League =

63rd season of the Lebanese Premier League

Lebanese Premier League
- Season: 2024–25
- Dates: 20 September 2024 – 19 July 2025
- Champions: Ansar (15th title)
- Relegated: Shabab Baalbek; Chabab Ghazieh
- AFC Challenge League: Ansar; Safa
- Matches: 156
- Goals: 430 (2.76 per match)
- Top goalscorer: Hassan Maatouk (17 goals)
- Biggest win: Shabab Sahel 1–8 Ahed (30 March 2025)
- Highest scoring: Shabab Sahel 1–8 Ahed (30 March 2025)

The 2024–25 Lebanese Premier League was the 63rd season of the Lebanese Premier League, the top Lebanese league for football clubs since its establishment in 1934.

It was the fifth season to feature a "split" format, following its introduction in the 2020–21 season, in which the season was divided into two phases. Ansar won their 15th title, after defeating Tadamon Sour 2–0 in the penultimate matchday. Chabab Ghazieh and Shabab Baalbek were relegated to the Lebanese Second Division.

On 26 September 2024, the Lebanese Football Association (LFA) suspended the season due to the escalation of the conflict in the south with Israel. Following the ceasefire agreement with Israel on 27 November 2024, the LFA announced that the season would resume on 25 January 2025.

== Summary ==
=== Regulations ===
Each club had to involve one player under the age of 21 for at least 750 minutes, and two players for 1,200 combined minutes. In case a club was not able to meet the required number of minutes at the end of the season, they would have had three points deducted from their total in the league.

Since the 2023–24 season, each club was able to have four foreign players under contract, an increase from the previous limit of three. Furthermore, video assistant referee (VAR), was introduced to the Lebanese Premier League in the second half of the 2023–24 season. It used technology and officials to assist the referee in making decisions on the pitch.

=== Format ===
Following its introduction in the 2020–21 season, the 2024–25 season consisted of two phases: in the first phase, each team played against one another once. In the second phase, the 12 teams were divided into two groups based on their position in the first phase. As introduced in the 2022–23 season, teams only carried over half of their point tally from the first phase. After the first phase was completed, clubs could not move out of their own half in the league, even if they had achieved more or fewer points than a higher or lower ranked team, respectively.

The top six teams played against each other three times, with the champion automatically qualifying to the AFC Challenge League. The bottom six teams also played against each other three times, with the bottom two teams being relegated to the Lebanese Second Division.

== Teams ==
Twelve teams competed in the league – the top ten teams from the previous season and the two teams promoted from the Lebanese Second Division. The promoted teams were Riyadi Abbasiyah, who played their first season in the Lebanese Premier League, and Shabab Baalbek, who returned to the top flight after an absence of five years. They replaced Tripoli and Ahly Nabatieh, who were relegated to the Lebanese Second Division after respective spells of 12 and one years in the top flight.

=== Stadiums and locations ===
Locations of the 2024–25 Lebanese Premier League teams
Beirut Lebanese Premier League clubs

Note: Table lists in alphabetical order.

Team	Location	Stadium	Capacity
Ahed	Beirut (Ouzai)	Al Ahed Stadium (Note: Only used as a training ground)	2,000
Ansar	Beirut (Tariq El Jdideh)	Ansar Stadium	—N/a
Bourj	Beirut (Bourj el-Barajneh)	Bourj el-Barajneh Stadium	1,500
Chabab Ghazieh	Ghazieh	Kfarjoz Municipal Stadium	2,000
Nejmeh	Beirut (Ras Beirut)	Rafic Hariri Stadium	5,000
Racing Beirut	Beirut (Achrafieh)	Fouad Chehab Stadium	5,000
Riyadi Abbasiyah	Aabbassiyeh	Abbass Kazem Nasser Stadium	—N/a
Safa	Beirut (Wata El Msaytbeh)	Safa Stadium	4,000
Sagesse	Beirut (Achrafieh)	Sin El Fil Stadium	—N/a
Shabab Baalbek	Baalbek	Baalbek Municipal Stadium	8,500
Shabab Sahel	Beirut (Haret Hreik)	Shabab Al Sahel Stadium	—N/a
Tadamon Sour	Tyre	Sour Municipal Stadium	6,500

=== Personnel and kits ===
Team	Head coach	Captain	Kit manufacturer	Shirt sponsor
Ahed	(Lebanon) Jamal Al Haj	(Lebanon) Hussein Dakik	(Spain) Kelme	
Ansar	(Lebanon) Youssef Al Jawhari	(Lebanon) Nassar Nassar	(Spain) Kelme	Green Glory
Bourj	(Lebanon) Fouad Hijazi	(Lebanon) Youssef Anbar	(Spain) Kelme	Royal
Chabab Ghazieh	(Lebanon) Rami Fakih	(Lebanon) Imad Ghaddar	(United States) Nike	Energizer
Nejmeh	(Egypt) Mahmoud Fathalla	(Lebanon) Kassem El Zein	(Spain) Kelme	BetArabia
Racing Beirut	(Sudan) Osama Sakr	(Lebanon) Ali Ayoub	(Spain) Joma	Libano-Suisse Insurance
Riyadi Abbasiyah	(Lebanon) Mohamad Zheir	(Lebanon) Fadel Ajami	(Spain) Kelme	La Fabrica
Safa	(Lebanon) Bassem Marmar	(Lebanon) Khalil Khamis	(Spain) Kelme	Tawfeer
Shabab Sahel	(Lebanon) Fadi El Kakhi	(Lebanon) Haytham Faour	(Germany) Jako	Xglobal Group
Sagesse	(Lebanon) Paul Rustom	(Lebanon) Hatem Eid	(United States) Capelli Sport	OMT Pay
Shabab Baalbek	(Lebanon) Hussein Mashour	(Lebanon) Hussein Outa	(Germany) Jako	La Vie
Tadamon Sour	(Lebanon) Hussein Hassoun	(Lebanon) Hussein Mhaydle	(Germany) Jako	GCB Exchange

=== Foreign players ===
Lebanese clubs were permitted to have up to four foreign players registered in their squad at any given time. In addition, clubs were allowed to include an unlimited number of Palestinian players on their matchday squad; however, only one Palestinian player could be fielded among the eleven starting players during a match. For clubs participating in Asian Football Confederation (AFC) competitions, two additional foreign players could be registered exclusively for continental fixtures. This was in accordance with AFC regulations, which allow a maximum of six foreign players in a starting lineup – one of whom must hold citizenship from an AFC member nation.

- Players in **bold** were registered during the mid-season transfer window.
- Players in italics left the club during the mid-season transfer window.

Team	Player 1	Player 2	Player 3	Player 4	Palestinian player(s)	AFC player(s)	Former player(s)
Ahed	(Angola) Ito	(Egypt) Ibrahim Abu El Yazeed	(Nigeria) **Seyi Olawoyin**	(Republic of the Congo) **Yann Makombo**	(Palestine) **Mohammad Ayoub**	—N/a	(Nigeria) Andrew Ikefe (Mauritania) Mamadou Niass (Palestine) Samer Zubaida
Ansar	(Tunisia) Rafik Mednini	(Algeria) Hichem Houssam Eddine	(Morocco) **Ayoub Nanah**	(Cameroon) **Daniel Kamy**	(Palestine) Mohamad Hebous	—N/a	(Senegal) Elhadji Malick Tall (Palestine) Hamza Hussein
Bourj	(Ghana) Ibrahim Abdulai	(Senegal) Abdoulaye Fall	(Ghana) **Francis Yaghr**	(Senegal) **Ibrahima Sene**	(Palestine) **Qossay Battat**	—N/a	(Ivory Coast) Chris Calvin Nawatta (Syria) Abbas Shahine
Chabab Ghazieh	(Ghana) **Philip Larbi**	(Mali) **Aboubacar Bemba Sangaré**	(Nigeria) **Abiodun Ayinde**	(Nigeria) **Adama Diaw**	(Palestine) Ayman Abou Sahyoun	—N/a	
Nejmeh	(Mali) **Aboubacar Sidiki Touré**	(England) **Gozie Ugwu**	(Democratic Republic of the Congo) **Ciel Ebengo**	(Cameroon) **Franklin Kuete Talla**	(Palestine) **Mounas Abo Amsha**		(Ghana) Collins Opare (Ghana) Nyanteh Kwabena Darko (Ghana) Baba Abdulai Musah
Racing Beirut	(Nigeria) **Cheikh Tidiane Coly**	(Nigeria) **Eze Okeuhie**	(Nigeria) **Raphael Onwrebe**	(Nigeria) **Emmanuel Okorie**	(Palestine) Jehad Abou El Aynein	—N/a	(Ivory Coast) Carter Ahiro (Republic of the Congo) David Molinga (Republic of the Congo) Julfin Ondongo
Riyadi Abbasiyah	(Ghana) Ezra Amelinsa	(Ghana) **Edward Atadana Kwame**	(Ghana) **Samuel Konney**	(Ghana) **Shaibu Taufiq**	(Palestine) Zaher Al Samahi	—N/a	(Lesotho) Masoabi Synous Nkoto (Nigeria) Francis Amos Anointed (Ghana) Ali Issah
Safa	(Sierra Leone) Rodney Michael	(Montenegro) **Boban Đorđević**	(Syria) **Yasin Al Samya**	(Ivory Coast) **Inters Gui**	(Palestine) Islam Batran	—N/a	(Cameroon) Guy Claude Eke (Tunisia) Houssem Louati (Cameroon) Jerome Etame (Kenya) Benson Omala
Sagesse	(Senegal) Papa Sidibe	(Senegal) Papa Laye Dieng	(Senegal) Alioune Faye	(Senegal) **Baffa Diop**		—N/a	(Tunisia) Hamza Zaak
Shabab Baalbek	(Rwanda) **Isaac Mitima**	(Syria) **Kamel Koaeh**	(Syria) **Mohamad Asaad**	(Senegal) **Manoumbé Wade**	(Palestine) **Yazan Iwaiwi**	—N/a	(Sierra Leone) Sulaiman Abdulai Keita (Guinea) Ibrahima Sauma (Sierra Leone) Ibrahim Sorie Kamara (Nigeria) Collins Anigbo
Shabab Sahel	(Nigeria) Samad Kadiri	(Nigeria) Reuben Gabriel	(Ghana) Abbey Agbodzie		(Palestine) Hadi Dakwar	—N/a	
Tadamon Sour	(Senegal) Baye Daour Badji	(Ghana) Amissah Anfoh Assan	(Ghana) Godfred Yeboah		(Palestine) Mohammad Ismail (Palestine) **Jihad Hallak** (Palestine) **Amin Idriss**	—N/a	(Brazil) Guilherme

== League table ==
Pos	Team	Pld	W	D	L	GF	GA	GD	Pts	Qualification or relegation (Note: Teams played each other once (11 matches), before the league was split into two groups (the top six and the bottom six) where each team played the other teams in their group three times (15 matches). Teams carried over half their point tally from the first phase into the second phase.)
1	Ansar (C)	26	20	3	3	58	15	+43	48	Qualification for the AFC Challenge League group stage
2	Safa	26	18	6	2	59	19	+40	46	Qualification for the AFC Challenge League group stage
3	Ahed	26	14	5	7	55	34	+21	33	
4	Nejmeh	26	11	7	8	41	30	+11	32	
5	Sagesse	26	8	6	12	28	37	−9	22	
6	Tadamon Sour	26	5	5	16	23	52	−29	13	
7	Bourj	26	13	3	10	30	32	−2	39	
8	Shabab Sahel	26	12	3	11	44	41	+3	33	
9	Racing Beirut	26	8	7	11	24	39	−15	27 (Note: Racing Beirut finished ahead of Riyadi Abbasiyah on head-to-head points: Racing Beirut 0–0 Riyadi Abbasiyah, Riyadi Abbasiyah 0–2 Racing Beirut, Racing Beirut 2–1 Riyadi Abbasiyah, Racing Beirut 1–4 Riyadi Abbasiyah.)	
10	Riyadi Abbasiyah	26	7	10	9	32	27	+5	27	
11	Shabab Baalbek (R)	26	4	6	16	17	55	−38	16	Relegation to Lebanese Second Division
12	Chabab Ghazieh (R)	26	2	7	17	19	49	−30	10	Relegation to Lebanese Second Division

Source: Global Sports Archive (Regular Season, Championship Round, Relegation Round)
Rules for classification: 1) Points; 2) Head-to-head points; 3) Head-to-head goal difference; 4) Goal difference; 5) Goals scored; 6) Disciplinary points.
(C) Champions; (R) Relegated

== Season statistics ==
=== Goalscorers ===
Rank	Player	Club	Goals
1	(Lebanon) Hassan Maatouk	Ansar	17
2	(Palestine) Islam Batran	Safa	14
3	(Ghana) Samuel Konney	Riyadi Abbasiyah	11
3	(Algeria) Hichem Houssam Eddine	Ansar	11
3	(Lebanon) Hassan Bazzi	Tadamon Sour	11
6	(Nigeria) Samod Kadiri	Shabab Sahel	10
6	(Lebanon) Zein Farran	Ahed	10
8	(Senegal) Papa Laye Dieng	Sagesse	9
8	(Lebanon) Mohammad Nasser	Ahed	9

=== Hat-tricks ===
Player	For	Against	Result	Date
(Senegal) Papa Laye Dieng	Sagesse	Bourj	3–1	25 January 2025
(Algeria) Hichem Houssam Eddine	Ansar	Riyadi Abbasiyah	5–0	1 February 2025
(Palestine) Islam Batran	Safa	Bourj	4–0	6 February 2025
(Lebanon) Hassan Salami	Shabab Sahel	Shabab Baalbek	5–0	12 February 2025
(Lebanon) Mohammad Nasser	Ahed	Tadamon Sour	4–0	13 February 2025
(Lebanon) Hassan Maatouk	Ansar	Ahed	4–2	25 February 2025
(Lebanon) Mohammad Nasser^{4}	Ahed	Shabab Sahel	8–1	30 March 2025
(Lebanon) Ali Al Haj	Ahed	Tadamon Sour	3–0	24 May 2025
(Algeria) Hichem Houssam Eddine	Ansar	Nejmeh	6–1	8 July 2025

Notes

^{4} Player scored 4 goals

== See also ==
- 2024 Lebanese Super Cup
