= 2009–10 Lebanese Premier League =

Lebanese Premier League
- Season: 2009–10
- Champions: Al Ahed
- Relegated: Al-Ahli; Hekmeh FC
- AFC Cup: Al-Ahed; Al-Ansar SC
- UAFA Cup: Al Nejmeh
- Top goalscorer: (Senegal) Makhete Diop (23)

The 2009–10 Lebanese Premier League was the 49th season of top-tier football in Lebanon. A total of twelve teams are competing in the league, with Al-Nejmeh the defending champions. The season began on 10 October 2009 and will concluded in May 2010.

== Teams ==
League size was increased from eleven to twelve teams for this season. Salam Zgharta were relegated to the second level of Lebanese football after ending the 2008–09 season in last place. Promoted from the second level were Al Islah Bourg Shamaly and Al-Ahli Saida.

=== Stadia and locations ===
Locations of teams in the 2009–10 Lebanese Premier League

Club	Location	Stadium
Al Ahed	Beirut	Beirut Municipal Stadium
Al-Ahli	Sidon	Saida Municipal Stadium
Al-Ansar	Beirut	Beirut Municipal Stadium
Al-Hikma	Beirut	Fouad Shehab Stadium
Al Islah	Tyre	Sour Stadium
Al-Mabarrah	Beirut	Mabarra Stadium
Al-Nejmeh	Beirut	Rafic El-Hariri Stadium
Al-Tadamon	Tyre	Sour Stadium
Racing	Beirut	Fouad Shehab Stadium
Safa	Beirut	Safa Stadium
Shabab Al-Sahel	Beirut	Beirut Municipal Stadium
Shabab Al-Ghazieh	Sidon	Saida Municipal Stadium

== Managerial changes ==
Team	Outgoing manager	Manner of departure	Replaced by
Al Nejmeh	(Lebanon) Emile Rustom	Resigned	(Egypt) Abdel Aziz Al Shafi

== Final league table ==
Pos	Team	Pld	W	D	L	GF	GA	GD	Pts	Qualification or relegation
1	Al Ahed	22	17	5	0	49	11	+38	56	2011 AFC Cup qualification
2	Al Nejmeh	22	14	3	5	48	21	+27	45	
3	Safa	22	13	6	3	42	20	+22	45	
4	Al Ansar	22	12	8	2	33	14	+19	44	2011 AFC Cup qualification (Note: As 2009–10 Lebanese FA Cup winners.)
5	Racing Beirut	22	7	8	7	21	21	0	29	
6	Al-Mabarrah	22	8	5	9	33	37	−4	29	
7	Shabab Al-Sahel	22	6	7	9	20	35	−15	25	
8	Al-Tadamon Tyre	22	7	3	12	21	28	−7	24	
9	Al Islah Bourg Shamaly	22	5	5	12	23	37	−14	20	
10	Shabab Al-Ghazieh	22	4	6	12	20	37	−17	18	
11	Al-Ahli Sidon (R)	22	4	5	13	12	34	−22	17	Relegated to Lebanese Second Division
12	Hekmeh FC (R)	22	2	5	15	18	45	−27	11	Relegated to Lebanese Second Division

Updated to match(es) played on 8 May 2010. Source:
Rules for classification: 1) points; 2) goal difference; 3) number of goals scored.
(R) Relegated
Notes:

2009–10 Lebanese Premier League winners
Al Ahed
2nd title

== Fixtures and results ==
Home \ Away	AHD	AAS	ANS	HEK	AMB	NJM	TAD	RCB	SFA	IBS	SAG	SAS
Al Ahed		2–0	1–0	2–1	2–1	2–0	2–0	3–1	1–0	4–0	1–1	7–1
Al-Ahli Sidon	1–3		0–3	1–1	1–2	0–3	1–0	0–2	0–1	0–1	1–1	1–1
Al Ansar	1–1	1–0		2–3	1–0	2–1	1–0	1–0	1–0	5–1	3–3	2–0
Al-Hikma	1–2	0–1	0–0		1–3	0–5	0–1	0–0	0–4	1–2	1–0	0–1
Al-Mabarrah	0–1	0–1	1–1	3–1		3–1	2–1	1–2	1–2	3–2	2–1	0–0
Al Nejmeh	2–2	4–0	0–1	5–1	4–0		5–1	1–0	0–3	1–0	2–0	2–0
Al-Tadamon Tyre	1–1	1–0	0–2	1–0	2–2	1–2		0–1	0–0	1–2	3–0	2–0
Racing Beirut	0–0	1–0	2–2	1–1	2–2	0–1	0–1		1–1	2–1	3–1	0–0
Safa	0–3	5–0	1–1	4–4	5–1	3–3	3–2	2–0		1–1	1–0	2–0
Al Islah Bourg Shamaly	0–2	0–2	0–0	3–0	3–2	1–1	1–2	0–0	0–1		2–3	0–1
Shabab Al-Ghazieh	0–3	1–1	0–3	1–0	1–2	0–3	2–1	1–2	0–1	1–1		1–1
Shabab Al-Sahel	0–4	1–1	0–0	3–2	2–2	1–2	1–0	2–1	1–2	4–2	0–2	

Updated to match(es) played on 8 May 2010. Source:
Legend: Blue = home team win; Yellow = draw; Red = away team win.
