= 1987–88 Lebanese Premier League =

Lebanese Premier League
- Season: 1987–88
- Champions: Ansar; 1st title
- Top goalscorer: Fouad Saad (6 goals)

The 1987–88 Lebanese Premier League season was the 29th season of the Lebanese Premier League, the top Lebanese professional league for association football clubs in the country, established in 1934. It was the first championship in 13 years, after the Lebanese Civil War.

Nejmeh were the defending champions; Ansar won their first Lebanese Premier League title.

== Summary ==
As multiple games were disrupted by crowd trouble, Safa, Salam Zgharta, Shabab Sahel, and Shabiba Mazraa were all penalized four points, while Tadamon Beirut and Nejmeh withdrew. The Lebanese Football Association (LFA) declared Ansar the champions, despite the season not being completed.

== League table ==
Pos	Team	Pld	W	D	L	GF	GA	GD	Pts	Qualification or relegation
1	Ansar	8	6	2	0	20	4	+16	14	
2	Riada Wal Adab	8	3	3	2	7	5	+2	9	
3	Safa (Note: Safa, Salam Zgharta, Shabab Sahel, and Shabiba Mazraa were docked 4 points.)	5	3	2	0	10	2	+8	4	
4	Salam Zgharta	8	2	2	4	8	10	−2	2	
5	Shabab Sahel	8	1	1	6	6	21	−15	−1	
6	Shabiba Mazraa	5	1	0	4	2	11	−9	−2	
7	Tadamon Beirut	0	0	0	0	0	0	0	0	Withdrew
8	Nejmeh	0	0	0	0	0	0	0	0	Withdrew

Source: rsssf.com
