= 1989–90 Lebanese Premier League =

30th season of the Lebanese Premier League

Lebanese Premier League
- Season: 1989–90
- Champions: Ansar; 2nd title
- Top goalscorer: Jamal Al Haj (12 goals)

The 1989–90 Lebanese Premier League season was the 30th season of the Lebanese Premier League, the top Lebanese professional league for association football clubs in the country, established in 1934.

Ansar, who were the defending champions, won their second consecutive—and overall—Lebanese Premier League title.

== League table ==
Pos	Team	Pld	W	D	L	GF	GA	GD	Pts	Qualification
1	Ansar	12	9	3	0	25	3	+22	21	Champions
2	Nejmeh	12	6	3	3	18	9	+9	15	
3	Safa	12	6	3	3	19	12	+7	15	
4	Tadamon Beirut	12	4	4	4	16	14	+2	12	
5	Salam Zgharta	12	4	3	5	9	13	−4	11	
6	Shabab Sahel	12	3	3	6	9	17	−8	9	
7	Shabiba Mazraa	12	0	1	11	5	33	−28	1	
