= 1991–92 Lebanese Premier League =

Lebanese Premier League
- Season: 1991–92
- Champions: Ansar; 4th title
- Relegated: Shabiba Mazraa (via play-out); Arz; Istiklal; Sagesse; Tadamon Tripoli
- Top goalscorer: Walid Dahrouj (20 goals)

The 1991–92 Lebanese Premier League season was the 32nd season of the Lebanese Premier League, the top Lebanese professional league for association football clubs in the country, established in 1934.

Ansar, the defending champions, won their fourth consecutive—and overall—Lebanese Premier League title.

== League table ==
=== Group A ===
| Pos | Team | Pld | W | D | L | GF | GA | GD | Pts | Qualification |
|---|---|---|---|---|---|---|---|---|---|---|
| 1 | Ansar | 18 | 16 | 2 | 0 | 62 | 5 | +57 | 34 | Qualified for championship play-off |
| 2 | Safa | 18 | 14 | 2 | 2 | 58 | 14 | +44 | 30 | |
| 3 | Nejmeh | 18 | 8 | 5 | 5 | 23 | 21 | +2 | 21 | |
| 4 | Tadamon Sour | 18 | 8 | 4 | 6 | 28 | 24 | +4 | 20 | |
| 5 | Bourj | 18 | 4 | 10 | 4 | 20 | 20 | 0 | 18 | |
| 6 | Shabab Sahel | 18 | 6 | 5 | 7 | 22 | 22 | 0 | 17 | |
| 7 | Ahli Saida | 18 | 4 | 6 | 8 | 18 | 32 | −14 | 14 | |
| 8 | Shabiba Mazraa | 18 | 5 | 3 | 10 | 24 | 52 | −28 | 13 | Qualified for relegation play-out |
| 9 | Arz | 18 | 4 | 2 | 12 | 15 | 39 | −24 | 10 | Relegation to Lebanese Second Division |
| 10 | Istiklal | 18 | 1 | 1 | 16 | 18 | 59 | −41 | −1 (Note: 4 points deducted.) | Relegation to Lebanese Second Division |

Source: rsssf.com

=== Group B ===
| Pos | Team | Pld | W | D | L | GF | GA | GD | Pts | Qualification |
|---|---|---|---|---|---|---|---|---|---|---|
| 1 | Tadamon Beirut | 18 | 11 | 6 | 1 | 24 | 10 | +14 | 28 | Qualified for championship play-off |
| 2 | Salam Zgharta | 18 | 8 | 6 | 4 | 26 | 17 | +9 | 22 | |
| 3 | Riada Wal Adab | 18 | 7 | 8 | 3 | 25 | 18 | +7 | 22 | |
| 4 | Homenetmen | 18 | 7 | 6 | 5 | 18 | 19 | −1 | 20 | |
| 5 | Harakat Shabab | 18 | 6 | 7 | 5 | 18 | 14 | +4 | 19 | |
| 6 | Ahli Sarba | 18 | 4 | 9 | 5 | 11 | 11 | 0 | 17 | |
| 7 | Racing Beirut | 18 | 5 | 7 | 6 | 11 | 15 | −4 | 17 | |
| 8 | Homenmen | 18 | 7 | 2 | 9 | 18 | 22 | −4 | 16 | Qualified for relegation play-out |
| 9 | Sagesse | 18 | 3 | 8 | 7 | 15 | 22 | −7 | 14 | Relegation to Lebanese Second Division |
| 10 | Tadamon Tripoli | 18 | 1 | 3 | 14 | 13 | 31 | −18 | 5 | Relegation to Lebanese Second Division |

Source: rsssf.com

== Relegation play-out ==
| Team 1 | Agg. | Team 2 | 1st leg | 2nd leg |
|---|---|---|---|---|
| Shabiba Mazraa | 1–3 | Homenmen | 0–2 | 1–1 |

== Championship play-off ==
| Team 1 | Agg. | Team 2 | 1st leg | 2nd leg |
|---|---|---|---|---|
| Ansar | 4–1 | Tadamon Beirut | 2–1 | 2–0 |
