= 1995–96 Lebanese Premier League =

Lebanese Premier League
- Season: 1995–96
- Champions: Ansar; 8th title
- Relegated: Harakat Shabab; Ahli Sarba
- Top goalscorer: Assaf Khalifa (19 goals)

The 1995–96 Lebanese Premier League season was the 36th season of the Lebanese Premier League, the top Lebanese professional league for association football clubs in the country, established in 1934.

Shabab Sahel and Riada Wal Adab joined as the promoted clubs from the 1994–95 Lebanese Second Division. They replaced Salam Zgharta and Ahli Saida who were relegated to the 1995–96 Lebanese Second Division. Ansar, the defending champions, won their eighth consecutive—and overall—Lebanese Premier League title.

== League table ==
Pos	Team	Pld	W	D	L	GF	GA	GD	Pts	Qualification
1	Ansar	26	18	6	2	52	11	+41	60	
2	Safa	26	14	7	5	43	22	+21	49	
3	Nejmeh	26	11	9	6	33	28	+5	42	
4	Bourj	25	11	9	5	28	23	+5	42	
5	Tadamon Sour	26	10	10	6	38	32	+6	40	
6	Homentmen	26	11	6	9	47	35	+12	39	
7	Homenmen	26	9	10	7	41	34	+7	37	
8	Akhaa Ahli Aley	26	8	8	10	28	27	+1	32	
9	Sagesse	25	6	13	6	32	31	+1	31	
10	Shabab Sahel	26	7	9	10	27	32	−5	30	
11	Riada Wal Adab	26	7	9	10	28	38	−10	30	
12	Racing Beirut	26	6	9	11	30	38	−8	27	
13	Harakat Shabab	26	6	5	15	27	44	−17	23	Relegation to Lebanese Second Division
14	Ahli Sarba	26	0	4	22	11	70	−59	4	Relegation to Lebanese Second Division

Source: rsssf.com

== Top goalscorers ==
Rank	Player	Club	Goals
1	Assaf Khalifa	Nejmeh	18
2	Vartan Ghazarian	Homenetmen	17
