= 1993–94 Lebanese Premier League =

Lebanese Premier League
- Season: 1993–94
- Champions: Ansar; 6th title
- Relegated: Shabab Sahel; Riada Wal Adab
- Top goalscorer: Mahmoud Hammoud (15 goals)

The 1993–94 Lebanese Premier League season was the 34th season of the Lebanese Premier League, the top Lebanese professional league for association football clubs in the country, established in 1934.

Ansar, the defending champions, won their sixth consecutive—and overall—Lebanese Premier League title.

== League table ==
Pos	Team	Pld	W	D	L	GF	GA	GD	Pts	Qualification
1	Ansar	26	13	11	2	32	13	+19	37	
2	Safa	26	10	10	6	34	25	+9	30	
3	Akhaa Ahli Aley	26	9	11	6	31	24	+7	29	
4	Racing Beirut	26	9	11	6	25	23	+2	29	
5	Nejmeh	26	9	9	8	35	28	+7	27	
6	Homenetmen	26	10	7	9	35	36	−1	27	
7	Homenmen	26	6	14	6	21	18	+3	26	
8	Sagesse	26	6	12	8	16	19	−3	24	
9	Ahli Sarba	26	5	14	7	22	26	−4	24	
10	Salam Zgharta	26	7	10	9	24	29	−5	24	
11	Tadamon Sour	26	8	8	10	25	33	−8	24	
12	Bourj	26	8	7	11	21	26	−5	23	
13	Shabab Sahel	26	6	11	9	22	30	−8	23	Relegation to Lebanese Second Division
14	Riada Wal Adab	26	1	15	10	11	24	−13	17	Relegation to Lebanese Second Division

Source: rsssf.com
