= Harakat Al Shabab SC =

Lebanese association football club

Harakat Shabab
- Full name: Harakat Al Shabab Sporting Club
- Founded: 1972; 54 years ago
- League: Lebanese Third Division
- 2024–25: Lebanese Third Division Group C, 4th of 6

Harakat Al Shabab Sporting Club (Arabic: نادي حركة الشباب الرياضي, lit. 'Youth Movement Sporting Club') is a football club based in Tripoli, Lebanon, that competes in the Lebanese Third Division. In 1991–92 Harakat Shabab reached the final of the Lebanese FA Cup, losing 2–0 after extra time against Nejmeh.

== Honours ==
- Lebanese Second Division
  - Winners (1): 1993–94
- Lebanese FA Cup
  - Runners-up (1): 1991–92
