= Al Shabiba Mazraa Beirut =

Lebanese football club

Shabiba Mazraa
- Full name: Al Shabiba Mazraa Beirut
- Short name: JSM
- Founded: 1940; 86 years ago
- Ground: Habib Abou Chahla Stadium

Al Shabiba Mazraa Beirut (Arabic: الشبيبة المزرعة بيروت; French: Jeunesse Sportive de Mazraa), also historically known as Cercle de la Jeunesse Catholique in French, is a football club based in the Mazraa district of Beirut, Lebanon. Established in 1940, it was one of the traditional multi-sports clubs in Lebanon with a long established program in football. The club's support mainly comes from the Greek Orthodox community, although it also has members from other religious communities.

== History ==
Founded in 1936, Shabiba Mazraa received their official license in 1940. The club won the Lebanese Second Division in the 1941–42 season, and winning back-to-back FA Cups in 1951 and 1952. In 1966–67 the club won the league title under the presidency of Nicolas Majdalani. However, the performances of the team deteriorated with the onslaught of the Lebanese Civil War.

During the 1991–92 season, the club lived a revival through the investor Robert Debbas and the Greek Orthodox trust. However, the club was relegated back to the Lebanese Second Division in the 1996–97 season. After they quit a game in the Second Division, they were immediately demoted to Lebanese Third Division. They ended up not playing a single game in the following season, and were demoted to the Lebanese Fourth Division. In the 2007–08 season, the club gained promotion to the Third Division.

== Colours and badge ==
In 1949, Nicola Majdalani created the club's first logo. It was a white flag with blue stripes.

== Honours ==
- Lebanese Premier League
  - Winners (1): 1966–67
- Lebanese FA Cup
  - Winners (2): 1950–51, 1951–52
  - Runners-up (1): 1961–62
- Lebanese Federation Cup
  - Winners (1): 1969
- Lebanese Second Division
  - Winners (2): 1941–42, 1995–96
