= Al Riyada Wal Adab Club =

Lebanese association football club

Al Riyada Wal Adab
- Full name: Al Riyada Wal Adab Club
- Nickname: سفير الشمال (Ambassador of the North)
- Founded: 1930; 96 years ago
- League: Lebanese Fourth Division
- 2023–24: Lebanese Fourth Division North Lebanon Group A, 2nd of 7
Home colours	Away colours

Al Riyada Wal Adab Club (Arabic: نادي الرياضة والأدب, lit. 'Sports and Literature Club') is a football club based in Tripoli, Lebanon, that competes in the Lebanese Fourth Division. Nicknamed "Ambassador of the North" (Arabic: سفير الشمال), Al Riyada Wal Adab was founded in 1930.

Al Riyada Wal Adab first participated in the Lebanese Premier League during the 1969–70 season. They finished as runners-up in 1987–88. Their last participation in the Lebanese top division dates back to the 1997–98 season, with the club playing between the Lebanese Second Division and Lebanese Third Division ever since.

== History ==
Founded in 1902, the club received their official licence in 1930; they are Tripoli's first football club. Izzat Al-Turk was a representative of the club at the Lebanese Football Association's founding meeting in 1933. Nazem Sayadi, the club's goalkeeper during the 1939–40 season, was the Lebanon national team's goalkeeper during their first international match against Mandatory Palestine in 1940.

Al Riyada Wal Adab first participated in the Lebanese Premier League during the 1969–70 season, finishing eighth out of 12. The Tripoli-based club participated in the 1987 Arab Club Champions Cup as the competition's Lebanese Premier League representative. In 1987–88, Al Riyada Wal Adab finished as runners-up in the league.

Al Riyada Wal Adab's last participation in the Lebanese top flight dates back to the 1997–98 season, where they came last and were relegated to the Lebanese Second Division. The club has played between the Second and Fourth Division ever since.

== Honours ==
- Lebanese Federation Cup
  - Winners (1): 1972
- Lebanese Second Division
  - Winners (1): 1994–95
- Lebanese Third Division
  - Winners (2): 1964–65, 2007–08
- Lebanese Premier League
  - Runners-up (1): 1987–88

== See also ==
- List of football clubs in Lebanon
