= Al Ansar FC =

Lebanese association football club

Ansar
- Full name: Al Ansar Football Club
- Nickname: الزعيم الأخضر (The Green Leader)
- Founded: 1951; 75 years ago
- Ground: Beirut Municipal Stadium
- Capacity: 18,000
- Chairman: Nabil Badr
- Manager: Sami El Choum
- League: Lebanese Premier League
- 2025–26: Lebanese Premier League, 1st of 12 (champions)
Home colours	Away colours

Al Ansar Football Club (Arabic: نادي الأنصار الرياضي, lit. 'The Supporters Sporting Club') is a football club based in Tariq El Jdideh, a district in Beirut, Lebanon, that competes in the Lebanese Premier League. Formed in 1951, the club did not win its first Lebanese Premier League until 1988. They went on to set a world record by winning the league 11 seasons in a row.

Ansar is the most successful club in the country, having won the Lebanese Premier League 16 times, the Lebanese FA Cup 16 times, and the Lebanese Federation Cup twice, all domestic records. They have also won the Lebanese Elite Cup twice and the Lebanese Super Cup six times. Ansar's major rivalry is with Nejmeh; dubbed the Beirut derby, it is the most anticipated game in Lebanon.

The club is primarily supported by the Sunni Muslim community; they had been funded by Rafic Hariri and Salim Diab until 2005. Nabil Badr has been the club's president and main patron since 2012.

== History ==
=== Early history (1948–1966) ===
In 1948, a group of young Beirutis set up the first administrative board at the club headed by Mustafa Al-Shami. Three years Misbah Dougan, then head of the administrative board, formally requested an official licence for the club allowing them to play football on all Lebanese grounds. They were to be called "Al-Intisar", Arabic for "Victory", however a club with that name was already present. Mustafa Al-Shami proposed "Ansar" in remembrance of the supporters of the Islamic prophet Muhammad.

Initially, Ansar was known as a Mount Lebanon team, rather than a team from Beirut. This is because, as Beirut had already too many clubs, the Federation decided to relocate Ansar to Ghobeiry. In 1965, Ansar moved to Beirut and won the 1966 Lebanese Second Division promotion play-offs, gaining promotion to the Lebanese Premier League for the following season.

=== Recent history (2020–present) ===
Ansar were crowned champions of the 2020–21 Lebanese Premier League by beating Nejmeh 2–1 in the Beirut derby in the last matchday; they won their 14th title, their first since 2007. They made the season a double, after beating Nejmeh in the Lebanese FA Cup final. Ansar won their 15th title in the 2024–25 season, and their 16th title in the 2025–26 season after beating Nejmeh 2–1 in the last matchday.

== Supporters ==
Although the club's roots lie in the Sunni community in Beirut, Ansar's support comes from all areas and religions in Lebanon. The club has been associated with the Hariri family from the early 1990s till 2005. In 2018, following the introduction of ultras groups in Lebanon, "Ultras Ansari 18" (UA18) was formed.

== Club rivalries ==
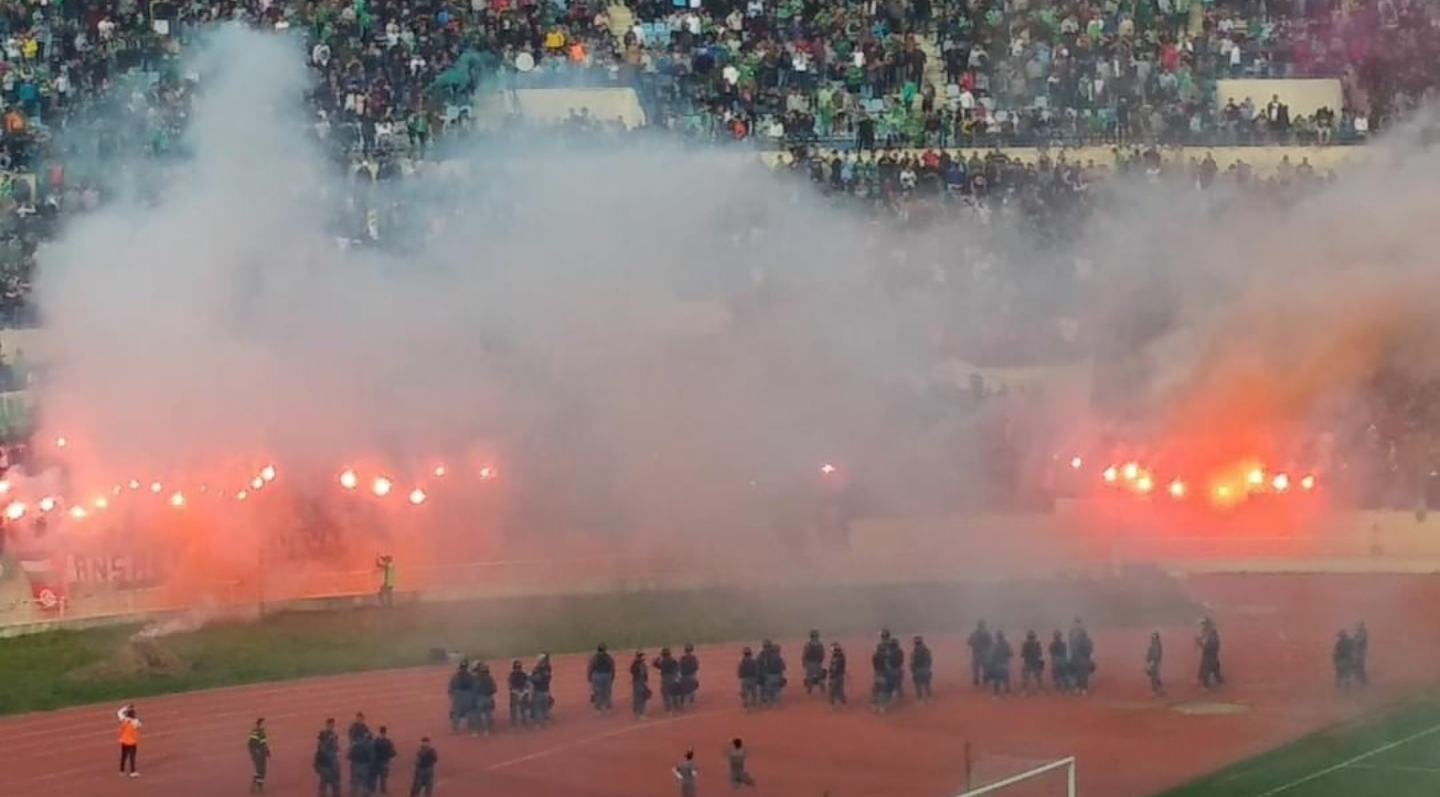
Ansar fans during the Beirut derby at the Camille Chamoun Stadium in 2018

The Beirut derby with Nejmeh has historically been the most anticipated game in Lebanon: both located in Beirut, Nejmeh and Ansar have shared the majority of titles. While Nejmeh has been more successful in Asia, Ansar holds the most league titles and FA Cups.

Another important rivalry is with Ahed: located in Beirut, they are affiliated with Hezbollah, with their fan base mostly coming from the Shia community in Beirut. In addition Ansar has a rivalry with Safa, also based in Beirut.

== Players ==
=== Current squad ===
As of 8 November 2026

Note: Flags indicate national team as defined under FIFA eligibility rules; some limited exceptions apply. Players may hold more than one non-FIFA nationality.

No.	Pos.	Nation	Player
1	GK	LBN	Hadi Kanj
2	DF	LBN	Mohamad El Dor
3	DF	LBN	Kassem Watfa
4	FW	LBN	Nader Matar
5	DF	LBN	Nassar Nassar
6	DF	LBN	Maxime Aoun
7	FW	LBN	Khalil Bader
8	MF	LBN	Mohamad Bou Saleh
9	FW	SEN	Elhadji Malick Tall
10	MF	LBN	Ali Tneich (captain)
11	MF	LBN	Majed Osman
12	MF	LBN	Ahmad Kheir El Dine
14	MF	LBN	Mahdi Zein
22	MF	LBN	Mohammad Al Massri
23	GK	LBN	Ibrahim Mokdad

No.	Pos.	Nation	Player
25	MF	TUN	Fahmi Kacem
30	FW	LBN	Mohamed Mahdi Sabbah
31	FW	ALG	Hicham Khalf Allah
33	MF	CMR	Nathaniel Nangolo
35	DF	TUN	Rafik Mednini
40	MF	NGR	Akuki Jibrin
44	GK	LBN	William Sanan
46	FW	PLE	Fouad Hebous
77	DF	LBN	Mostafa Kassab
—	DF	LBN	Joseph Daher
—	MF	LBN	Hassan Mokdad
—	MF	LBN	Hassan Nasser
—	FW	LBN	Khaled Al Hajjar
—		LBN	Mohammad Taabani

=== Out on loan ===
Note: Flags indicate national team as defined under FIFA eligibility rules; some limited exceptions apply. Players may hold more than one non-FIFA nationality.

No.	Pos.	Nation	Player
—	FW	PLE	Mohamad Hebous (at Jwaya until 30 June 2028)
—	FW	LBN	Mohammad Al-Saleh (at Akhaa Ahli Aley until 30 June 2027)
—	FW	LBN	Karim Tarhini (at Akhaa Ahli Aley until 30 June 2027)

=== Notable players ===
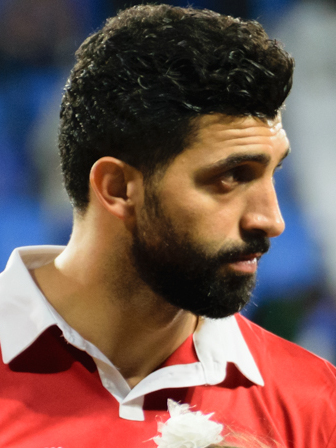
Ansar's captain Mootaz El Jounaidi with Lebanon at the 2019 AFC Asian Cup

Players in international competitions
Competition	Player	National team
1996 CONCACAF Gold Cup	David Nakhid	Trinidad and Tobago
2000 AFC Asian Cup	Jadir	Lebanon
2000 AFC Asian Cup	Newton	Lebanon
2000 AFC Asian Cup	Jamal Taha	Lebanon
2007 AFC Asian Cup	Ahmad Mnajed	Iraq
2007 AFC Asian Cup	Salih Sadir	Iraq
2019 AFC Asian Cup	Hassan Chaito	Lebanon
2019 AFC Asian Cup	Hassan Chaitou	Lebanon
2019 AFC Asian Cup	Adnan Haidar	Lebanon
2019 AFC Asian Cup	Mootaz El Jounaidi	Lebanon
2023 AFC Asian Cup	Mouhammed-Ali Dhaini	Lebanon
2023 AFC Asian Cup	Yahya El Hindi	Lebanon
2023 AFC Asian Cup	Hassan Maatouk	Lebanon
2023 AFC Asian Cup	Robert Alexander Melki	Lebanon
2023 AFC Asian Cup	Nassar Nassar	Lebanon
2023 AFC Asian Cup	Ali Tneich	Lebanon

== Technical staff ==
Position	Staff
Head coach	(Lebanon) Sami El Choum
Assistant coach	(Lebanon) Hassan Hassoun
Goalkeeper coach	(Lebanon) Sultan Kassem
Performance analyst	(Syria) Mustafa Amam
Fitness coach	(Syria) Abed Karout
Physiotherapist	(Lebanon) Nabil Dimashkie
Therapist	(Lebanon) Khalil Moussa
Administrator	(Lebanon) Marwan El Achi
Equipment manager	(Lebanon) Neshat Chamaa
Equipment assistant	(Lebanon) Rami Berro
Equipment assistant	(Lebanon) Mohammad El Achi
Media officer	(Lebanon) Sara Mehtar
Team photographer	(Lebanon) Fadi Marak

Last updated: 25 August 2026

== Chairmen history ==
- (Lebanon) Mustafa El-Shami (1948–1950)
- (Lebanon) Ameen Itani (1950–1954)
- (Lebanon) Fouad Rustom (1954–1956)
- (Lebanon) Abdul Jalil Al-Sabra (1956–1963)
- (Lebanon) Jamil Hasbeeny (1963–1965)
- (Lebanon) Abed El-Jamil Ramadan (1965–1967)
- (Lebanon) Khaled Kabbani (1967–1975)
- (Lebanon) Said Wanid (1975–1977)
- (Lebanon) Salim Diab (1977–2008)
- (Lebanon) Karim Diab (2008–2012)
- (Lebanon) Nabil Badr (2012–present)

== Honours ==
- Lebanese Premier League
  - Winners (16; record): 1987–88, 1989–90, 1990–91, 1991–92, 1992–93, 1993–94, 1994–95, 1995–96, 1996–97, 1997–98, 1998–99, 2005–06, 2006–07, 2020–21, 2024–25, 2025–26
- Lebanese FA Cup
  - Winners (16; record): 1987–88, 1989–90, 1990–91, 1991–92, 1993–94, 1994–95, 1995–96, 1998–99, 2001–02, 2005–06, 2006–07, 2009–10, 2011–12, 2016–17, 2020–21, 2023–24
  - Runners-up (5): 1985–86, 1996–97, 2000–01, 2018–19, 2021–22
- Lebanese Federation Cup
  - Winners (2; joint record): 1999, 2000
- Lebanese Elite Cup (defunct)
  - Winners (2): 1997, 2000
  - Runners-up (8): 1996, 1998, 2005, 2008, 2010, 2016, 2019, 2022
- Lebanese Super Cup
  - Winners (6): 1996, 1997, 1998, 1999, 2012, 2021
  - Runners-up (5): 2002, 2010, 2017, 2019, 2024
- National Solidarity Tournament
  - Winners (1): 2026

== Performance in AFC competitions ==
- AFC Champions League: 11 appearances

1988–89: Qualifying stage
1989–90: Qualifying stage
1991: Qualifying stage
1993–94: Quarter-finals
1994–95: Quarter-finals
1995: Second round
1997–98: Quarter-finals
1998–99: Second round
1999–2000: Second round
2000–01: First round
2002–03: Qualifying stage

- AFC Cup: 8 appearances

2007: Group stage
2008: Group stage
2011: Group stage
2013: Group stage
2018: Group stage
2020: Cancelled
2021: Group stage
2022: Group stage

- AFC Challenge League: 1 appearance

2025–26: Quarter-finals

- Asian Cup Winners' Cup: 2 appearances

1991–92: First round
1996–97: First round

== See also ==
- Al Ansar FC (women), defunct women's team
- List of football clubs in Lebanon
