= Lebanese Premier League =

Association football league in Lebanon

- Organising body: Lebanese Football Association
- Founded: May 1934; 92 years ago
- Country: Lebanon
- Confederation: AFC
- Number of clubs: 12
- Level on pyramid: 1
- Relegation to: Lebanese Second Division
- Domestic cups: Lebanese FA Cup; Lebanese Super Cup
- League cup: Lebanese Federation Cup
- International cup: AFC Challenge League
- Current champions: Ansar (16th title) (2025–26)
- Most championships: Ansar (16 titles)
- Top scorer: Hassan Maatouk (132)
- Broadcasters: MTV Lebanon, DAZN
- Sponsor: Fantasia
- Website: the-lfa.com
- Current: 2026–27 Lebanese Premier League

The Lebanese First Division (Arabic: الدوري اللبناني الدرجة الأولى), commonly known as the Lebanese Premier League (Arabic: الدوري اللبناني الممتاز) in English, is the top division of the Lebanese football league system. Established in 1934 and organized by the Lebanese Football Association (LFA), the Lebanese Premier League is one of the oldest in the Middle East, originally launched under the name Edmond Rubeiz Cup.

As of the 2026–27 season, the league features 12 clubs. Clubs play a 22-match home-and-away first phase before the league is divided into six-team championship and relegation groups. Half of each club's points from the first phase are carried over, and each club plays a further 10 matches in the second phase. The league champion qualifies for the AFC Challenge League, while the bottom two teams are relegated to the Lebanese Second Division. The league introduced Video Assistant Referee (VAR) technology in 2023.

Prominent early clubs included Nahda (who won the first edition), Homenetmen, and Homenmen. In recent years, clubs such as Ahed, Ansar, and Nejmeh have dominated the competition. Ansar holds the record for most league titles with 16, including a streak of 11 consecutive championships between 1988 and 1999. (Note: The record has since been surpassed by Latvian First League club Skonto.) Throughout its history, the league has experienced several interruptions due to political instability and conflict.

== History ==
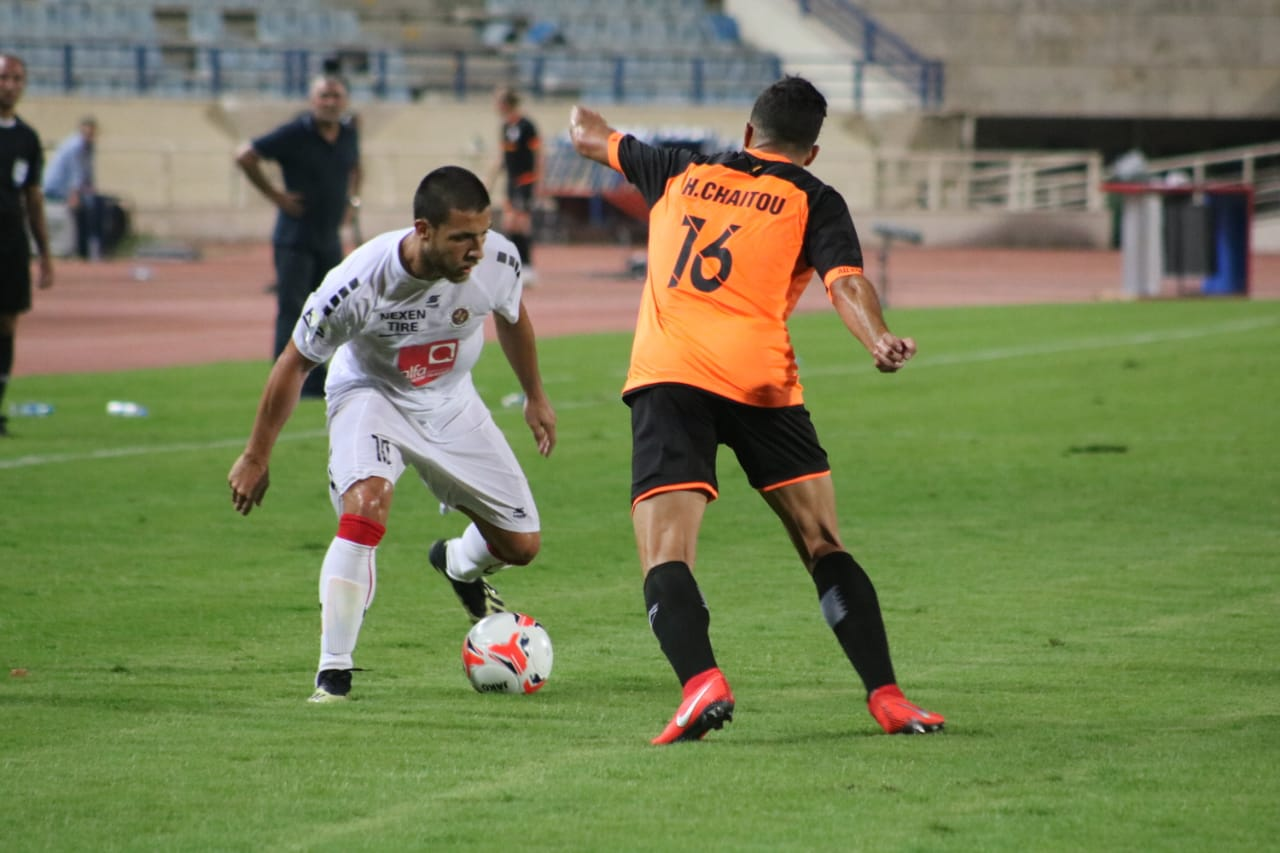
A Beirut derby match between Nejmeh and Ansar during the 2019–20 season.

On 22 March 1933, representatives of 13 football clubs gathered in the Minet El Hosn district in Beirut to form the Lebanese Football Association (LFA). The Lebanese Premier League began in May 1934 as the Edmond Rubeiz Cup, in honour of Nahda player Edmond Rubeiz who had died of typhoid the previous year. The competition was held in a knockout format, with Nahda beating DPHB 7–1 in the final to win the inaugural competition.

Nahda, AUB, and DPHB shared the titles during the first decade of the league. Between the 1940s and 1960s Armenian clubs, mainly Homenetmen and Homenmen, were the most prominent in the Lebanese footballing scene. The two clubs shared 11 titles in 16 seasons between 1943 and 1969. Following a 12-year interruption of the league due to the Lebanese Civil War, Ansar dominated the league winning 11 consecutive league titles between 1988 and 1999. They set a Guinness World Record for most consecutive league titles, which has been since broken by Skonto of Latvia in 2002.

Nejmeh broke Ansar's streak, winning four out of five league titles between 2000 and 2005. Since the late 2000s, Ahed have emerged as the dominant force in Lebanese football. They won their inaugural league title in 2008 and have since been crowned champions a total of nine times. After having won the league title in 2019, Ahed became the three-time defending champions, a feat accomplished only one other time, by Ansar in 1992. Due to financial and political issues in the country, as well as the COVID-19 pandemic, the LFA decided to cancel the ongoing 2019–20 season.

== Competition format ==
There are 12 clubs in the Lebanese Premier League. Teams receive three points for a win and one point for a draw. No points are awarded for a loss.

Teams are ranked by total points, followed by head-to-head points and head-to-head goal difference. If still equal, overall goal difference and then overall goals scored are taken into consideration. If teams remain tied, disciplinary points are considered.

=== Split ===
Before the 2020–21 season, each club played the other club twice, once at home and once away, for a total of 22 matches.

In 2020–21, the league introduced a split format in which each club played every other club once in the first phase, for 11 matches, before the league was divided into a top six and a bottom six. Each club then played the other teams in its group once. From 2021–22 to 2022–23, clubs played the other teams in their respective groups twice in the second phase. Beginning in 2022–23, clubs also carried half of their points from the first phase into the second phase.

During the 2023–24 season, clubs played the other teams in their respective groups three times in the second phase. For the 2025–26 season, the format changed to a first phase played on a home-and-away basis, followed by a championship group comprising the top four clubs and a relegation group comprising the next four; both groups were also scheduled to play on a home-and-away basis. In the 2026–27 season, the first phase again consisted of home-and-away matches, after which the league was divided into two groups of six, with each group playing a further home-and-away round.

=== Promotion and relegation ===
A system of promotion and relegation has existed between the Lebanese Premier League and the Lebanese Second Division since 1935. In April 1935, Second Division clubs requested that a promotion system be implemented. It was proposed that, at the end of the season, every Second Division team seeking promotion to the First Division would have to play against three First Division teams and win all three matches. The First Division teams were required to have at least seven players from their previous season's squad.

The number of clubs relegated from the Lebanese Premier League varies according to the regulations adopted for each season. In the 2025–26 season, two clubs were relegated to the Lebanese Second Division, one following its withdrawal from the competition and the other through its final league position.

The LFA initially planned to reduce the First Division from 12 to 10 clubs for the 2027–28 season, which would have resulted in four clubs being relegated from the 2026–27 Premier League and two being promoted from the Second Division. In August 2026, however, the LFA Executive Committee reversed the decision and retained the 12-club format, restoring the system under which the bottom two First Division clubs are relegated.

=== Video assistant referee ===
Video assistant referee (VAR) was introduced to the Lebanese Premier League during the second half of the 2023–24 season. It uses video technology and match officials to assist the referee in reviewing decisions during matches. A match between Ahed and Racing Beirut on 6 August 2023 was used to test the VAR system before its introduction.

== Clubs ==
=== 2026–27 season ===
The following 12 clubs are competing in the Lebanese Premier League during the 2026–27 season.

Club	Home city	Position in 2025–26	Top division titles	Most recent top division title
Ahed	Beirut (Ouzai)	4th	9	2022–23
Akhaa Ahli Aley	Aley	2nd in the Second Division	0	—N/a
Ansar	Beirut (Tariq el-Jdideh)	1st	16	2025–26
Jwaya	Jwaya	3rd	0	—N/a
Mabarra	Beirut (Tariq el-Matar)	8th	0	—N/a
Nejmeh	Beirut (Ras Beirut)	2nd	9	2023–24
Riyadi Abbasiyah	Abbassiyeh	9th	0	—N/a
Safa	Beirut (Wata el-Msaytbeh)	5th	3	2015–16
Sagesse	Beirut (Achrafieh)	6th	0	—N/a
Shabab Sahel	Beirut (Haret Hreik)	7th	0	—N/a
Tadamon Sour	Tyre	10th	0	—N/a
Tripoli	Tripoli	1st in the Second Division	1	2002–03

Locations of the 2026–27 Lebanese Premier League clubs
Location of clubs around Beirut for the 2026–27 Premier League

=== Champions ===
Wins by season

Ed.	Season	Champion
1	1933–34	Nahda (1)
2	1934–35	AUB (1)
3	1935–36	DPHB (1)
4	1936–37	AUB (2)
5	1937–38	AUB (3)
6	1938–39	DPHB (2)
	1939–40	Not contested
7	1940–41	DPHB (3)
8	1941–42	Nahda (2)
9	1942–43	Nahda (3)
10	1943–44	Homenetmen (1)
11	1944–45	Homenmen (1)
12	1945–46	Homenetmen (2)
13	1946–47	Nahda (4)
14	1947–48	Homenetmen (3)
15	1948–49	Nahda (5)
	1949–50	Not contested
16	1950–51	Homenetmen (4)
	1951 to 1953	Not contested
17	1953–54	Homenmen (2)

No.	Season	Champion
18	1954–55	Homenetmen (5)
19	1955–56	Racing Beirut (1)
20	1956–57	Homenmen (3)
	1957 to 1960	Not contested
21	1960–61	Homenmen (4)
	1961–62	Not contested
22	1962–63	Homenetmen (6)
	1963–64	Not contested
23	1964–65	Racing Beirut (2)
	1965–66	Not contested
24	1966–67	Shabiba Mazraa (1)
	1967–68	Not contested
25	1968–69	Homenetmen (7)
26	1969–70	Racing Beirut (3)
	1970 to 1972	Not contested
27	1972–73	Nejmeh (1)
	1973–74	Not contested
28	1974–75	Nejmeh (2)
	1975 to 1987	Not contested
29	1987–88	Ansar (1)

No.	Season	Champion
	1988–89	Not contested
30	1989–90	Ansar (2)
31	1990–91	Ansar (3)
32	1991–92	Ansar (4)
33	1992–93	Ansar (5)
34	1993–94	Ansar (6)
35	1994–95	Ansar (7)
36	1995–96	Ansar (8)
37	1996–97	Ansar (9)
38	1997–98	Ansar (10)
39	1998–99	Ansar (11)
40	1999–2000	Nejmeh (3)
	2000–01	Abandoned
41	2001–02	Nejmeh (4)
42	2002–03	Olympic Beirut (1)
43	2003–04	Nejmeh (5)
44	2004–05	Nejmeh (6)
45	2005–06	Ansar (12)
46	2006–07	Ansar (13)
47	2007–08	Ahed (1)

No.	Season	Champion
48	2008–09	Nejmeh (7)
49	2009–10	Ahed (2)
50	2010–11	Ahed (3)
51	2011–12	Safa (1)
52	2012–13	Safa (2)
53	2013–14	Nejmeh (8)
54	2014–15	Ahed (4)
55	2015–16	Safa (3)
56	2016–17	Ahed (5)
57	2017–18	Ahed (6)
58	2018–19	Ahed (7)
	2019–20	Abandoned
59	2020–21	Ansar (14)
60	2021–22	Ahed (8)
61	2022–23	Ahed (9)
62	2023–24	Nejmeh (9)
63	2024–25	Ansar (15)
64	2025–26	Ansar (16)

Wins by club
Club	Wins	Winning seasons
Ansar	16	1987–88, 1989–90, 1990–91, 1991–92, 1992–93, 1993–94, 1994–95, 1995–96, 1996–97, 1997–98, 1998–99, 2005–06, 2006–07, 2020–21, 2024–25, 2025–26
Ahed	9	2007–08, 2009–10, 2010–11, 2014–15, 2016–17, 2017–18, 2018–19, 2021–22, 2022–23
Nejmeh	9	1972–73, 1974–75, 1999–00, 2001–02, 2003–04, 2004–05, 2008–09, 2013–14, 2023–24
Homenetmen	7	1943–44, 1945–46, 1947–48, 1950–51, 1954–55, 1962–63, 1968–69
Nahda	5	1933–34, 1941–42, 1942–43, 1946–47, 1948–49
Homenmen	4	1944–45, 1953–54, 1956–57, 1960–61
AUB	3	1934–35, 1936–37, 1937–38
DPHB	3	1935–36, 1938–39, 1940–41
Racing Beirut	3	1955–56, 1964–65, 1969–70
Safa	3	2011–12, 2012–13, 2015–16
Shabiba Mazraa	1	1966–67
Olympic Beirut	1	2002–03

== Stadiums ==
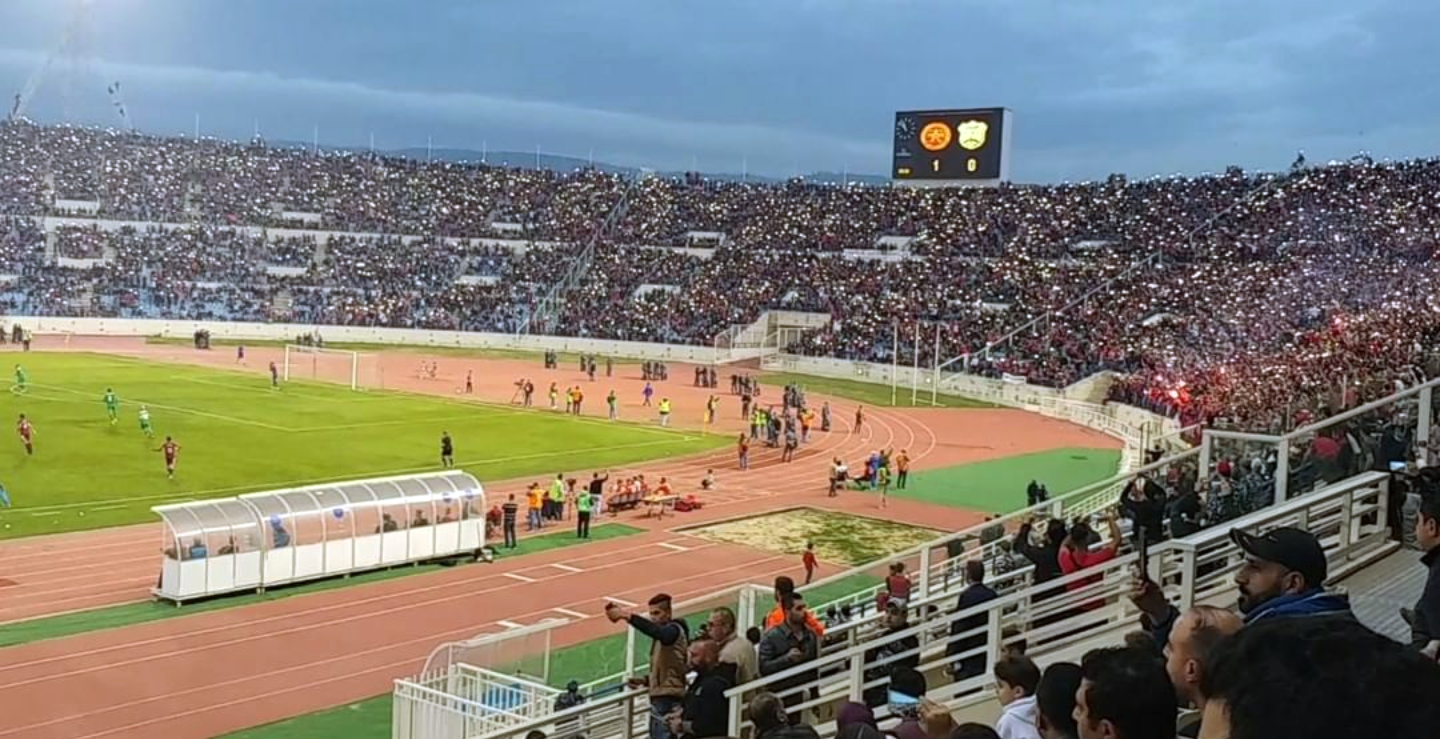
The Camille Chamoun Sports City Stadium in 2018

At the start of the 2005–06 season, the Lebanese government imposed a ban on spectators due to fears of political and sectarian-inspired violence in the stadiums. After six years, in 2011, the ban was lifted and fans were allowed to regularly attend matches. While attendance was initially scarce, spectators started to show up more regularly season after season. Indeed, in 2018 ultras groups started to form, with Nejmeh's "Ultras Supernova" being the first. Other teams quickly followed, such as Ansar, Ahed and Bourj.

== Players ==
=== Foreign players and transfer regulations ===
Prior to the 2023–24 season, Lebanese clubs were permitted three foreign players on the field simultaneously. Additionally, up to two extra Palestinian players born in Lebanon could be listed on a match sheet, but only one Palestinian player was allowed among the eleven players on the field. Furthermore, each club competing in an AFC competition could field one additional foreign player exclusively for continental matches, as the AFC permitted four foreign players in the starting eleven, one of whom from an AFC country.

Starting from 2023–24, the foreign player limit increased to four, and Palestinian players on a team sheet became unlimited, with the field restriction remaining. Following an alteration in AFC regulations, allowing six foreign players in the starting eleven, including one from an AFC country, clubs in AFC competitions are now allowed two extra foreign players to be only fielded in continental competitions.

The foreign-player regulations were amended several times before the 2026–27 season. Regulations issued on 31 July 2026 were interpreted as allowing clubs to register more than five non-Lebanese players while naming a maximum of five on the official match sheet. The LFA subsequently clarified that the number of registered foreign players was itself limited to five, prompting an objection from Nejmeh, which argued that the clarification changed the original regulation. On 27 August, the LFA Executive Committee amended the rule to allow each club to register up to seven foreign players, with a maximum of five permitted on the official match sheet for each match. A Palestinian player registered with the Lebanese authorities as a Palestinian is counted as a non-Lebanese player under the 2026–27 regulations.

Since the 1998–99 season, the LFA has prevented the acquisition of foreign goalkeepers. Due to the economic situation in Lebanon, clubs were barred from fielding foreign players in the league in 2020–21 and the first half of 2021–22.

Players may only be transferred during transfer windows that are set by the LFA. The two transfer windows run from 15 May to 25 July and from 1 January to 30 January.

=== Homegrown players ===
Starting from the 2019–20 season, all teams in the Lebanese Premier League and Lebanese Second Division must involve a certain number of under-21 players in both the league and the Lebanese FA Cup. In case a club were to not meet the required number of minutes at the end of the season, they would have three points deducted from their total in the league. Initially, the quota was set at a minimum of 1,000 minutes for one under-22 player, a minimum of 1,500 aggregate minutes for two players and a minimum of 2,000 aggregate minutes for three players.

As the 2019–20 season was cancelled, the player quota was ultimately implemented for the 2020–21 season, with a few amendments. Each club had to involve one player for at least 600 minutes, two players for at least 800 combined minutes, and three players for at least 1,200 combined minutes. Also, each club is allowed a maximum of eight players over the age of 30, with only five being able to be fielded in a game. In the 2022–23 season, the quotas changed to 2,000 combined minutes for two under-21 players and 3,000 combined minutes for three players. In 2023–24, the quotas changed once again, to 750 minutes for one under-21 player and 1,000 combined minutes for two players.

For the 2026–27 season, the youth quota applies to players born in 2005 or later. One such player must accumulate at least 1,500 minutes across the league and Lebanese FA Cup, while two such players must accumulate at least 2,500 minutes between them. The restriction on the number of players over the age of 30 was also removed for the 2026–27 season.

=== Top scorers ===
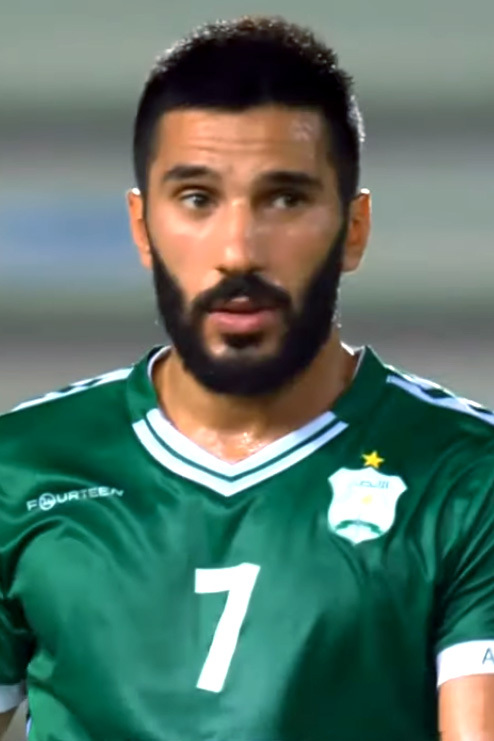
Hassan Maatouk is the top scorer in Lebanese Premier League history with 131 goals.

As of 22 November 2026

Bold indicates a player still active in the Lebanese Premier League. Italics indicates a player still active outside the Lebanese Premier League.

Rank	Player	Club(s)	Years active	Goals
1	(Lebanon) **Hassan Maatouk**	Ahed, Nejmeh, Ansar, Jwaya	2004–2011, 2017–present	132
2	(Lebanon) Vardan Ghazaryan	Homenetmen, Sagesse	1992–2002, 2003–2004, 2006–2009	129
3	(Lebanon) Fadi Alloush	Ansar, Akhaa Ahli Aley, Homenmen	1985–1999	124
4	(Lebanon) Abbas Ahmad Atwi	Nejmeh, Shabab Arabi, Shabab Sahel, Akhaa Ahli Aley	1997–2012, 2012–2022	115
5	(Lebanon) Mohammad Kassas	Shabab Sahel, Sagesse, Olympic Beirut, Nejmeh, Ahed, Safa	1999–2005, 2006–2008, 2008–2011, 2016–2017	114
6	(Lebanon) Haitham Zein	Tadamon Sour, Nejmeh, Chabab Ghazieh, Islah Borj Shmali, Salam Sour	1995–2006, 2008–2012	113
7	(Lebanon) Ghassan Choueikh	Bourj, Majd, Shabab Sahel, Tadamon Sour, Safa, Rayyan Sarafand, Mabarra	1997–2012	97
8	(Senegal) **Elhadji Malick Tall**	Ansar	2017–2020, 2022–2024, 2026–present	94
9	(Lebanon) Abbas Ali Atwi	Bourj, Olympic Beirut, Ahed	2000–2022	91
10	(Lebanon) Zaher Al Indari	Akhaa Ahli Aley, Safa	1992–2005	85

Hassan Maatouk holds the record for most Lebanese Premier League goals, with 131. Seven players were top scorers more than once: Elhadji Malick Tall four times, Hassan Maatouk three times, and Levon Altonian, Fadi Alloush, Mohammad Kassas, Mohammed Ghaddar, and Lucas Galán twice. Fadi Alloush holds the record for most goals in a season (32) while playing for Ansar.

== Media coverage ==
Television broadcasting rights for the Lebanese Premier League were awarded to MTV Lebanon beginning with the 2016–17 season, under a five-year contract worth US$600,000 per season. In August 2022, the LFA renewed its television broadcasting agreement with MTV for a further four seasons. Between 2020 and 2022, the LFA streamed league matches not covered by MTV on its YouTube channel. In October 2022, the LFA announced an agreement with FIFA+ to stream matches not covered by MTV, replacing the LFA's YouTube broadcasts.

== Sponsorship ==
=== Title sponsorship ===
In the 2011–12 season, telecommunications company Alfa began sponsoring the league. In October 2014, the LFA, media company JGroup and television channel Al Jadeed announced that the competition would officially be named the Alfa Lebanese Football League (دوري ألفا اللبناني لكرة القدم). The 2019–20 season was the last to use the Alfa branding.

For the 2026–27 season, the competition was named the Fantasia Football Championship (بطولة فانتازيا لكرة القدم), after Lebanese chips manufacturer Fantasia became its title sponsor, in partnership with MTV Lebanon.

=== Official match ball ===
On 30 July 2019, the LFA announced a three-year agreement with German sportswear company Jako worth €120,000, under which Jako supplied the league's official match ball from the 2019–20 season. In October 2020, the LFA confirmed that Jako Lebanon balls would be used for a second consecutive season in the first and second divisions and the Lebanese FA Cup.

== See also ==
- Football in Lebanon
- Lebanese football league system
- Lebanese Women's Football League
- Lebanon national football team
- Al-Manar Football Festival
- List of top-division football clubs in AFC countries

== Notes and references ==
=== Bibliography ===
- Sakr, Ali Hamidi (1992). موسوعة كرة القدم اللبنانية 1991–1992 [1991–1992 Lebanese Football Encyclopedia] (PDF) (in Arabic). مؤسسة نوفل للتوزيع. ISBN 0000281247.
