= Shadi Skaf =

Lebanese footballer (born 1994)

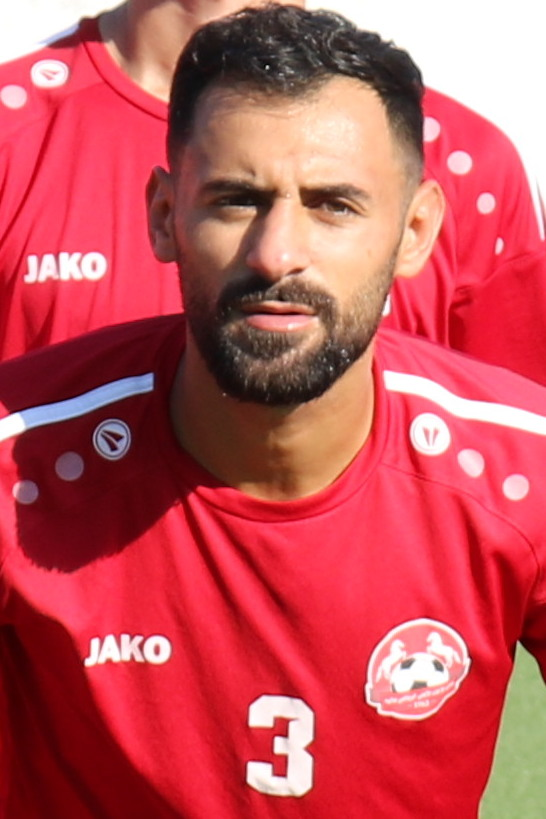
- Skaf with Akhaa Ahli Aley in 2020

Personal information
- Full name: Shadi Mustafa Skaf
- Date of birth: 9 February 1994 (age 32)
- Place of birth: Burj el-Shemali, Lebanon
- Position: Defender

Team information
- Current team: Sagesse

Youth career
- Islah Bourj Shmali

Senior career*
Years	Team	Apps	(Gls)
2010–2013	Islah Bourj Shmali		
2013–2016	Nejmeh	14	(0)
2015–2016	Nabi Chit	7	(0)
2016–2017	Salam Zgharta	20	(0)
2017–2018	Tadamon Sour	20	(0)
2018–2021	Akhaa Ahli Aley	36	(1)
2021–2024	Bourj	49	(1)
2021–2022	→ Churchill Brothers (loan)	1	(0)
2024–2025	Racing Beirut	19	(0)
2025–2026	Tadamon Sour	14	(0)
2026–	Sagesse	0	(0)

International career
2013	Lebanon U20		
2015	Lebanon U23	4	(0)
- * Club domestic league appearances and goals as of 13 September 2026

Shadi Mustafa Skaf (Arabic: شادي مصطفى سكاف; born 9 February 1994) is a Lebanese professional footballer who plays as a defender for Lebanese Premier League club Sagesse.

== Club career ==
=== Lebanon ===
Coming through the youth system, Skaf began his career at Islah Bourj Shmali in the 2010–11 Lebanese Premier League. In 2011 he was awarded Lebanese Young Player of the Year. On 8 July 2013, Skaf joined Nejmeh, before moving to Nabi Chit on 13 October 2015.

On 17 August 2016, Skaf was signed by Salam Zgharta. After having terminated his contract with Salam, Tadamon Sour announced the signing of Skaf on a four-year contract on 5 July 2017. On 3 August 2018, Skaf joined Akhaa Ahli Aley. After three years at the club, on 7 June 2021, he moved to Bourj.

=== Churchill Brothers ===
Skaf moved abroad, joining I-League side Churchill Brothers on 20 August 2021. He made his debut in their 1–0 defeat to Gokulam Kerala on 26 December. On 12 January 2022, the club announced that the two had parted ways on mutual terms.

=== Return to Lebanon ===
Following his experience in India, Skaff returned to Bourj in January 2022. Despite having been announced as a Tadamon Sour player in June 2024, Skaf joined Racing Beirut two months later. In July 2025, Skaf returned to Tadamon Sour. After becoming a free agent, he joined Sagesse on a one-year deal in August 2026.

== International career ==
Having also captained the under-20 team at the 2013 Jeux de la Francophonie, Skaf represented Lebanon at under-23 level in 2015, playing four games in the 2016 AFC U-23 Championship qualification.

Skaf was first called up to the Lebanon national team in October 2014, as part of a mixed squad of senior and Olympic players for friendly matches against Qatar and Saudi Arabia.

== Style of play ==
Skaf is a defender who can play as a centre-back or left-back, and can be deployed as a defensive midfielder when needed.

== Honours ==
Nejmeh

- Lebanese Premier League: 2013–14
- Lebanese FA Cup: 2015–16; runner-up: 2014–15
- Lebanese Elite Cup: 2014; runner-up: 2013
- Lebanese Super Cup: 2014

Salam Zgharta

- Lebanese Challenge Cup runner-up: 2016

Tadamon Sour

- Lebanese Challenge Cup runner-up: 2017

Individual

- Lebanese Premier League Best Young Player: 2010–11
