= 2010–11 Lebanese Premier League =

Lebanese Premier League
- Season: 2010–11
- Champions: Al Ahed; 3rd title
- Relegated: Al Islah; Shabab Al-Ghazieh
- AFC Cup: Al Ahed (group stage); Safa (group stage)
- Matches: 264
- Goals: 326 (1.23 per match)
- Top goalscorer: Hassan Maatouk (15)
- Biggest home win: Al-Ansar 6–0 Salam Sour (18 February 2011)
- Biggest away win: Salam Sour 0–5 Al-Ansar (7 November 2010); Shabab Al-Sahel 0–5 Al-Ansar (11 February 2011)
- Highest scoring: Racing 3–4 Al Ahed (17 April 2011)

The 2010–11 Lebanese Premier League is the 50th season of top-tier football in Lebanon. A total of twelve teams are competing in the league, with Al Ahed the defending champions.

== Teams ==
Al-Ahli and Al-Hikma were relegated to the second level of Lebanese football after ending the 2009–10 season in the bottom two places. Promoted from the second level were Al Ikhaa Al Ahli and Salam Sour.

=== Stadia and locations ===
Locations of teams in the 2010–11 Lebanese Premier League

Club	Location	Stadium
Al Ahed	Beirut	Beirut Municipal Stadium
Al-Ansar	Beirut	Beirut Municipal Stadium
Al Islah	Tyre	Sour Stadium
Al-Mabarrah	Beirut	Mabarra Stadium
Al-Nejmeh	Beirut	Rafic El-Hariri Stadium
Al-Tadamon	Tyre	Sour Stadium
Racing	Beirut	Fouad Shehab Stadium
Safa	Beirut	Safa Stadium
Shabab Al-Sahel	Beirut	Beirut Municipal Stadium
Shabab Al-Ghazieh	Sidon	
Al-Akhaa Al-Ahli	Aley	
Salam Sour	Tyre	Sour Stadium

== Final league table ==
Pos	Team	Pld	W	D	L	GF	GA	GD	Pts	Qualification or relegation
1	Al Ahed (C)	22	17	4	1	51	18	+33	55	2012 AFC Cup group stage
2	Safa	22	14	3	5	38	21	+17	45	2012 AFC Cup group stage (Note: As league runners-up as Al Ahed were also the 2010–11 Lebanese FA Cup winners.)
3	Al Nejmeh	22	13	5	4	34	19	+15	44	
4	Al Ansar	22	12	7	3	40	15	+25	43	
5	Al-Mabarrah	22	10	6	6	34	26	+8	36	
6	Racing Beirut	22	7	8	7	26	20	+6	29	
7	Al-Akhaa Al-Ahli Aley	22	6	6	10	17	25	−8	24	
8	Salam Sour	22	7	2	13	19	45	−26	23	
9	Shabab Al-Sahel	22	6	4	12	21	33	−12	22	
10	Al-Tadamon Tyre	22	4	8	10	15	23	−8	20	
11	Shabab Al-Ghazieh (R)	22	5	5	12	17	37	−20	20	Relegated to Lebanese Second Division
12	Al Islah Al Bourj Al Shimaly (R)	22	0	4	18	14	44	−30	4	Relegated to Lebanese Second Division

Updated to match(es) played on 24 April 2011. Source: Goalzz, FIFA
Rules for classification: 1) points; 2) goal difference; 3) number of goals scored.
(C) Champions; (R) Relegated

=== Positions by round ===
Team ╲ Round	1	2	3	4	5	6	7	8	9	10	11	12	13	14	15	16	17	18	19	20	21	22
Al Ahed	1	1	2	1	3	4	3	3	2	1	1	1	1	1	1	1	1	1	1	1	1	1
Safa	9	5	4	3	2	1	1	2	1	4	4	2	2	2	3	2	2	2	2	2	2	2
Al Nejmeh	3	2	1	4	4	3	4	5	6	5	5	5	3	3	2	3	4	4	4	4	4	3
Al Ansar	2	4	3	2	1	2	2	1	3	2	2	3	4	4	4	4	3	3	3	3	3	4
Al-Mabarrah	4	6	8	8	7	6	6	6	5	6	6	6	6	5	5	5	5	5	5	5	5	5
Racing Beirut	5	7	9	6	5	5	5	4	4	3	3	4	5	6	6	6	6	6	6	6	6	6
Al-Akhaa Al-Ahli Aley	10	9	10	10	11	10	10	7	8	8	7	7	7	7	7	7	7	7	7	7	7	7
Salam Sour	12	12	12	12	12	12	12	11	11	9	9	10	11	8	8	8	8	8	8	8	8	8
Shabab Al-Sahel	8	10	7	9	9	9	9	10	7	7	8	9	8	9	9	9	9	11	10	9	9	9
Al-Tadamon Tyre	7	3	5	5	6	7	7	8	9	10	10	11	10	11	11	11	11	10	11	11	10	10
Shabab Al-Ghazieh	6	8	6	7	8	8	8	9	10	11	11	8	9	10	10	10	10	9	9	10	11	11
Al Islah Al Bourj Al Shimaly	11	11	11	11	10	11	11	12	12	12	12	12	12	12	12	12	12	12	12	12	12	12

Source: Goalzz

== Fixtures and results ==
Home \ Away	AHD	AKA	ANS	IBS	AMB	NJM	TAD	RCB	SFA	SLS	SAG	SAS
Al Ahed		1–0	2–2	3–0	2–1	5–0	2–0	0–1	1–0	2–0	2–0	3–1
Al-Akhaa Al-Ahli Aley	0–1		0–1	1–0	1–1	0–1	1–0	2–1	1–1	1–0	1–1	2–1
Al Ansar	0–0	3–0		2–1	3–2	1–1	1–0	0–0	2–1	6–0	1–2	3–0
Al Islah Bourg Shamaly	0–4	0–1	2–3		0–1	0–2	0–1	2–2	1–2	1–1	1–2	0–2
Al-Mabarrah	2–2	0–0	1–1	2–0		1–0	2–0	2–1	2–2	3–0	1–3	3–2
Al Nejmeh	0–2	2–1	0–1	3–2	1–1		1–0	1–0	2–1	2–0	5–0	2–1
Al-Tadamon Tyre	2–2	1–1	0–0	1–1	1–2	1–1		0–1	1–2	3–0	0–0	0–0
Racing Beirut	3–4	2–2	2–0	4–0	2–1	0–0	0–0		0–1	2–0	1–1	0–0
Safa	2–3	3–1	1–0	1–0	3–1	1–3	3–0	0–0		3–1	3–0	1–0
Salam Sour	1–5	2–1	0–5	2–0	1–0	0–3	3–2	1–0	1–3		3–0	2–1
Shabab Al-Ghazieh	2–3	2–0	0–0	1–1	0–2	1–4	0–1	1–3	0–2	1–0		0–1
Shabab Al-Sahel	1–2	1–0	0–5	3–2	1–3	0–0	0–1	2–1	1–2	1–1	2–0	

Updated to match(es) played on 24 April 2011. Source: Goalzz
Legend: Blue = home team win; Yellow = draw; Red = away team win.

== Top scorers ==
Rank	Player	Club	Goals
1	(Lebanon) Hassan Maatouk	Ahed	15
2	(Lebanon) Tarek El Ali	Mabarra	13
3	(Lebanon) Mahmoud El Ali	Ahed	11
4	(Lebanon) Akram Moghrabi	Nejmeh	10
5	(Lebanon) Abbas Ahmad Atwi	Nejmeh	9
6	(Lebanon) Haitham Zein	Islah Bourj Shmali	8
