= Haitham Zein =

Lebanese footballer (born 1979)

Personal information
- Full name: Haitham Ali Mohamad Al Haj Ali Zein
- Date of birth: 6 January 1979 (age 47)
- Place of birth: Fallujah, Iraq
- Height: 1.76 m (5 ft 9 in)
- Position: Forward

Youth career
- 1994–1995: Tadamon Sour

Senior career*
Years	Team	Apps	(Gls)
1995–2005	Tadamon Sour		(94)
2005–2006	Nejmeh		(0)
2006–2008	Bahrain SC		(7)
2008–2009	Chabab Ghazieh		(2)
2009–2011	Islah Borj Shmali		(13)
2011–2012	Salam Sour	15	(3)
Total		?	(119)

International career
2002	Lebanon U23		(1)
1997–2004	Lebanon	50	(16)
- * Club domestic league appearances and goals

Haitham Ali Mohamad Al Haj Ali Zein (Arabic: هيثم علي محمد الحج علي زين; born 6 January 1979), or simply Haitham Zein, is a Lebanese former footballer who played as a forward. He played for numerous Lebanese Premier League clubs, mainly at Tadamon Sour, and represented Lebanon internationally.

== Early life ==
Zein was born in Iraq to parents from Burj el-Shamali, Lebanon; he began playing football aged 11 in the streets of the Al-Anbar Governorate. He then moved to Lebanon with his family due to the Gulf War.

== Club career ==
=== Tadamon Sour ===
Zein signed for Tadamon Sour's youth team in 1994. He made his senior debut in 1995, coming on as an 80th-minute substitute against Bourj at the Saida Municipal Stadium; trailing 2–1, Zein scored a goal and assisted two, helping his side overturn the result to 4–2. He played with Tadamon until 2005, scoring 94 league goals.

=== Nejmeh ===
On 9 November 2005, Zein moved to Nejmeh, spending half a season. He described his short experience at Nejmeh as negative.

=== Bahrain SC ===
He moved abroad to Bahrain SC in 2006.

=== Return to Lebanon ===
He returned to Lebanon in 2008, signing for Chabab Ghazieh, before moving to Islah Borj Shmali the following season. Zein was among the league's top scorers in the 2010–11 Lebanese Premier League, scoring eight goals. In October 2011, he signed for Salam Sour, making 15 appearances for the side and scoring three goals. He retired that season.

Zein scored 112 goals in the Lebanese Premier League – 96 without considering his goals scored in the cancelled 2000–01 season.

== International career ==
In 2002, Zein played for the Lebanon Olympic team at the 2002 Asian Games, scoring a goal in an 11–0 win against Afghanistan. He played for the senior team between 1998 and 2004. He played 50 international matches, scoring 16 goals.

== Managerial career ==
Between 2016 and 2017, Zein was part of the technical staff of his former club Islah Borj Shmali.

== Personal life ==
Zein's nephew, Mahdi Zein, also plays football.

== Career statistics ==
=== International ===
List of international goals scored by Haitham Zein
No.	Date	Venue	Opponent	Score	Result	Competition
1.	23 August 1999	Amman International Stadium, Amman, Jordan	Jordan	1–0	3–1	1999 Arab Games
2.	23 August 1999	Amman International Stadium, Amman, Jordan	Jordan	2–0	3–1	1999 Arab Games
3.	23 August 1999	Amman International Stadium, Amman, Jordan	Jordan	3–0	3–1	1999 Arab Games
4.	25 August 1999	Al-Hassan Stadium, Irbid, Jordan	Oman	1–0	1–1	1999 Arab Games
5.	16 February 2000	Lebanon	North Korea	1–0	1–0	Friendly
6.	8 March 2000	King Abdullah II Stadium, Amman, Jordan	Jordan	1–1	1–1	Friendly
7.	25 May 2000	King Abdullah II Stadium, Amman, Jordan	Kyrgyzstan	1–0	2–0	2000 WAFF Championship
8.	25 June 2000	Tripoli, Lebanon	Kuwait	1–1	1–3	Friendly
9.	10 September 2000	Camille Chamoun Sports City Stadium, Beirut, Lebanon	United Arab Emirates	2–?	2–2	Friendly
10.	7 March 2001	Tripoli International Stadium, Tripoli, Lebanon	Syria	1–0	2–2	Friendly
11.	13 May 2001	Beirut Municipal Stadium, Beirut, Lebanon	Pakistan	1–0	6–0	2002 FIFA World Cup qualification
12.	13 May 2001	Beirut Municipal Stadium, Beirut, Lebanon	Pakistan	2–0	6–0	2002 FIFA World Cup qualification
13.	13 May 2001	Beirut Municipal Stadium, Beirut, Lebanon	Pakistan	5–0	6–0	2002 FIFA World Cup qualification
14.	28 May 2001	Suphachalasai Stadium, Bangkok, Thailand	Sri Lanka	4–0	5–0	2002 FIFA World Cup qualification
15.	9 June 2004	Beirut Municipal Stadium, Beirut, Lebanon	Maldives	1–0	3–0	2006 FIFA World Cup qualification
16.	19 June 2004	Azadi Stadium, Tehran, Iran	Syria	1–3	1–3	2004 WAFF Championship

== Honours ==
Tadamon Sour

- Lebanese FA Cup: 2000–01

Individual

- Lebanese Premier League top scorer: 1998–99, 2000–01
- Lebanese Premier League Team of the Season: 1998–99

== See also ==
- List of Lebanon international footballers
- List of Lebanon international footballers born outside Lebanon
- List of association football families
