= Mahdi Zein =

Lebanese footballer (born 2001)

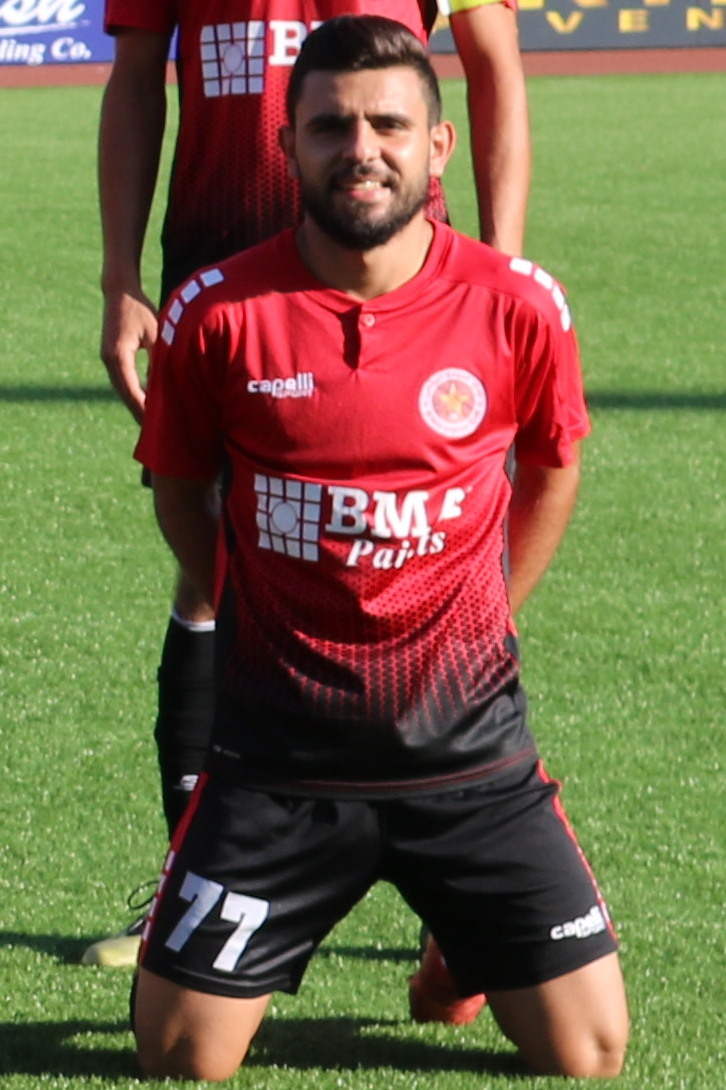
- Zein with Nejmeh in 2020

Personal information
- Full name: Mahdi Wissam Zein
- Date of birth: 23 May 2000 (age 26)
- Place of birth: Burj el-Shamali, Lebanon
- Height: 1.70 m (5 ft 7 in)
- Position: Midfielder

Team information
- Current team: Ansar
- Number: 14

Youth career
- Nejmeh

Senior career*
Years	Team	Apps	(Gls)
2020–2026	Nejmeh	113	(8)
2026–	Ansar	15	(1)

International career^{‡}
2015	Lebanon U16	3	(0)
2017	Lebanon U19	1	(0)
2021	Lebanon U23	6	(0)
2021–	Lebanon	15	(1)
- * Club domestic league appearances and goals as of 09:43, 3 August 2026 (UTC) ‡ National team caps and goals as of 31 December 2023

Mahdi Wissam Zein (Arabic: مهدي وسام زين; born 23 May 2000) is a Lebanese footballer who plays as a midfielder for Lebanese Premier League club Ansar and the Lebanon national team.

== Club career ==
On 29 April 2019, Nejmeh renewed the contract of Zein for five years, renewable for two additional seasons. On 2 April 2021, Zein scored his first senior goal against Shabab Sahel, helping his side win 3–0 in the league. In July 2024, Zein renewed his contract with Nejmeh for two more years.

On 5 January 2026, Zein transferred to cross-city rivals Ansar on a two-and-half-year contract.

== International career ==
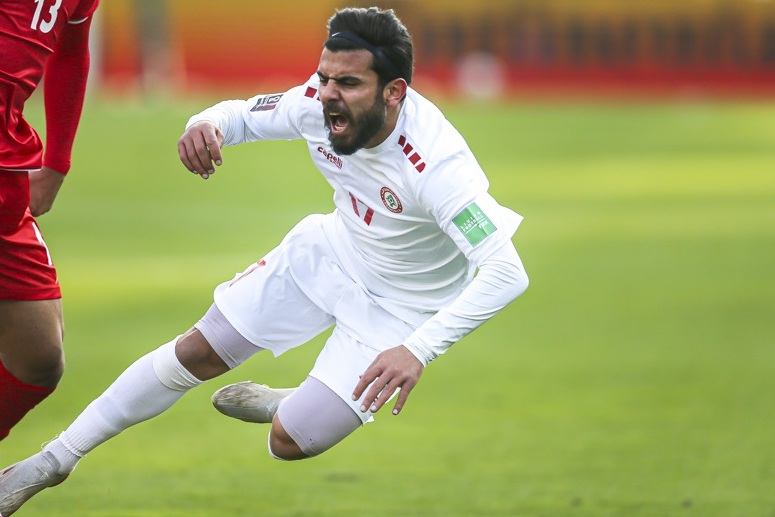
Zein with the Lebanon national team against Iran in 2022

Zein represented Lebanon at under-16, under-19 and under-23 levels. His senior debut came on 4 December 2021, as a substitute in a 2–0 defeat to Algeria in the 2021 FIFA Arab Cup. On 25 June 2023, Zein scored his first senior international goal in a 4–1 win against Bhutan in the 2023 SAFF Championship.

== Style of play ==
Zein plays as a playmaking midfielder, operating in a role that links defence and attack. He is noted for his through passes and ball control.

== Personal life ==
Mahdi Zein's paternal uncle, Haitham Zein, is a former Lebanese international.

== Career statistics ==
=== International ===
As of match played 10 September 2023

Appearances and goals by national team and year
National team	Year	Apps	Goals
Lebanon	2021	2	0
Lebanon	2022	3	0
Lebanon	2023	10	1
Total		15	1

Scores and results list Lebanon's goal tally first, score column indicates score after each Zein goal.

List of international goals scored by Mehdi Zein
No.	Date	Venue	Opponent	Score	Result	Competition
1	25 June 2023	Sree Kanteerava Stadium, Bangalore, India	Bhutan	4–0	4–1	2023 SAFF Championship

== Honours ==
Nejmeh

- Lebanese Premier League: 2023–24
- Lebanese FA Cup: 2021–22, 2022–23
- Lebanese Elite Cup: 2021
- Lebanese Super Cup: 2023, 2024

Ansar

- Lebanese Premier League: 2025–26

== See also ==
- List of association football families
