= Karin Saab =

Venezuelan footballer (born 2001)

Personal information
- Full name: Karin Alfredo Saab Pomonti
- Date of birth: 11 January 2001 (age 25)
- Place of birth: Caroní, Venezuela
- Height: 1.78 m (5 ft 10 in)
- Position: Right-back

Team information
- Current team: Tadamon Sour
- Number: 13

Youth career
- Mineros de Guayana

Senior career*
Years	Team	Apps	(Gls)
2019–2022	Mineros de Guayana	57	(0)
2023	Deportivo La Guaira	3	(0)
2024	Angostura	5	(0)
2025	Anzoátegui	0	(0)
2025–	Tadamon Sour	10	(0)
- * Club domestic league appearances and goals as of 27 February 2026

Karin Alfredo Saab Pomonti (born 11 January 2001) is a Venezuelan professional footballer who plays as a right-back for Lebanese Premier League club Tadamon Sour.

== Career ==
Coming through the youth system, Saab made his Venezuelan Primera División debut for Mineros de Guayana in January 2019. On 11 February 2023, Saab joined Deportivo La Guaira. Saab and the club terminated the contract on mutual terms on 5 December 2023. On 17 January 2024, Saab moved to Angostura.

On 31 August 2025, Saab moved to Lebanon, joining Tadamon Sour in the Lebanese Premier League.

== International career ==
Born in Venezuela, Saab is of Lebanese descent and is eligible to play for both Venezuela and Lebanon internationally.

He was called up to the Venezuela national under-20 team for two training camps in Porlamar, Venezuela between October and December 2019, and for a training camp in Valencia, Spain between 26 and 30 December 2020.

== Career statistics ==
=== Club ===
As of match played 15 March 2025

Appearances and goals by club, season and competition
Club	Season	League			National cup (Note: Includes Copa Venezuela, Lebanese FA Cup)		Continental		Total	
Club	Season	Division	Apps	Goals	Apps	Goals	Apps	Goals	Apps	Goals
Mineros de Guayana	2019	Venezuelan Primera División	16	0	1	0	—		17	0
Mineros de Guayana	2020	Venezuelan Primera División	15	0	—		—		15	0
Mineros de Guayana	2021	Venezuelan Primera División	4	0	—		1 (Note: Appearance in Copa Sudamericana)	0	5	0
Mineros de Guayana	2022	Venezuelan Primera División	22	0	—		—		22	0
Mineros de Guayana	Total		57	0	1	0	1	0	59	0
Deportivo La Guaira	2023	Venezuelan Primera División	3	0	—		—		3	0
Angostura	2024	Venezuelan Primera División	5	0	—		—		5	0
Anzoátegui	2025	Venezuelan Primera División	0	0	—		—		0	0
Tadamon Sour	2025–26	Lebanese Premier League	0	0	0	0	—		0	0
Career total			65	0	1	0	1	0	67	0
