= Sour Municipal Stadium =

Stadium in Tyre, Lebanon

- ملعب صور البلدي
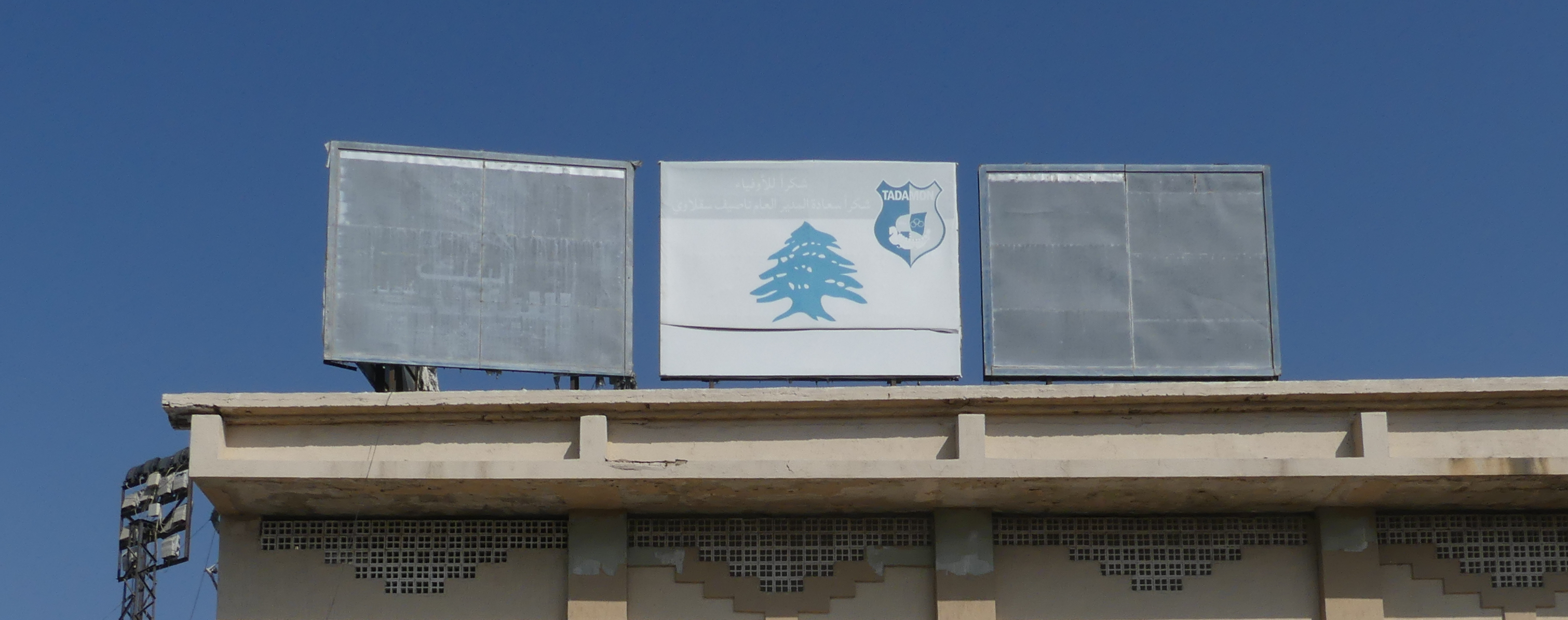
- Sour Municipal Stadium in 2019
- Interactive map of Sour Municipal Stadium
- Location: Tyre, Lebanon
- Coordinates: 33.274816°N 35.2116°E
- Capacity: 6,500
- Surface: Grass

Construction
- Opened: 1947

Tenants
- Tadamon Sour; Salam Sour

Sour Municipal Stadium (Arabic: ملعب صور البلدي), also known as Al Bass Municipal Stadium (Arabic: ملعب البص البلدي), is a multi-use stadium in Tyre, Lebanon. It is used mostly for football matches and serves as the home for Tadamon Sour and Salam Sour. The stadium was built in 1947 and holds 6,500 people.

Since the end of the 2022–23 season, the stadium has been out of service and was due to be renovated. Renovations began in September 2026, and concluded in October 2026, marking the stadium's return to host games in three and a half years.
