= Tadamon SC Sour =

Lebanese association football club

Tadamon Sour
- Full name: Tadamon Sporting Club Sour
- Nickname: سفير الجنوب (Ambassador of the South)
- Short name: Tadamon
- Founded: 1946; 80 years ago
- Ground: Sour Municipal Stadium
- Capacity: 6,500
- Manager: Bilal Hajo
- League: Lebanese Premier League
- 2025–26: Lebanese Premier League, 10th of 12
- Website: tadamonsour.com
Home colours	Away colours

Tadamon Sporting Club Sour (Arabic: نادي التضامن الرياضي صور, lit. 'Solidarity Sporting Club Tyre'), known as Tadamon Sour or simply Tadamon, is a football club based in Tyre, Lebanon, that competes in the Lebanese Premier League, and is primarily supported by the Shia Muslim community. They play their home matches at the Tyre Municipal Stadium, and have won one Lebanese FA Cup and two Lebanese Challenge Cups.

== History ==
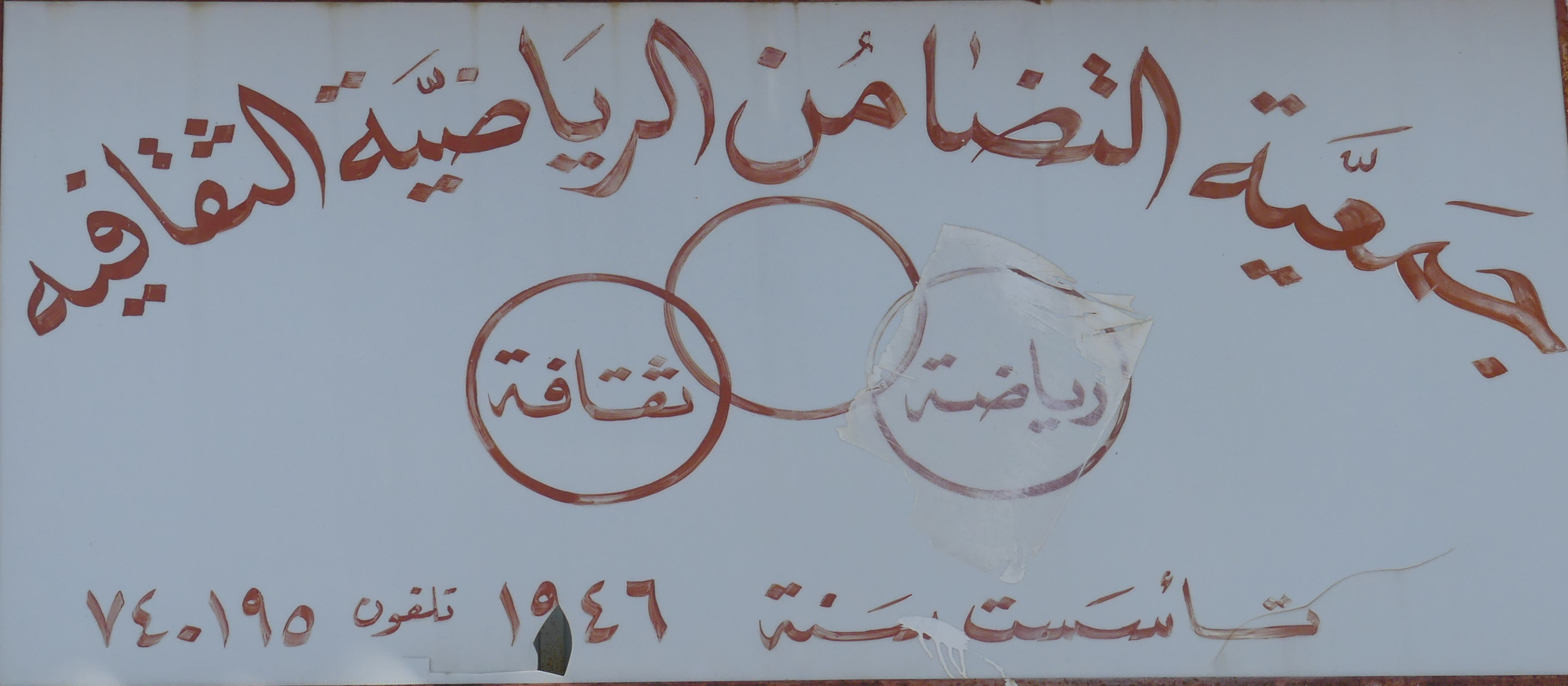
Sign in front of the entrance of the Tadamon SC Sour building

In 1939, a group of students from Tyre, Lebanon, established a football team, which officially received its license in 1947. Due to the 1948 Palestinian expulsion and flight, a number of Palestinian players joined Tadamon Sour. The team played numerous games in Syria and Jordan, and hosted Egyptian club Al Ahly in Tyre.

In 1991 Tadamon Sour finished runners-up in the Lebanese Second Division, and were promoted to the Lebanese Premier League. In 2000–01 they won the Lebanese FA Cup, beating Ansar 2–1 in the final.

== Club rivalries ==
Tadamon Sour plays Salam Sour in the Tyre derby. The club also plays the South derby with Ghazieh, based on their location.

== Players ==
=== Current squad ===
As of 8 November 2026

Note: Flags indicate national team as defined under FIFA eligibility rules; some limited exceptions apply. Players may hold more than one non-FIFA nationality.

No.	Pos.	Nation	Player
4	DF	LBN	Khodor Hallak
5	FW	LBN	Hadi Madi
6	DF	LBN	Shadi Alhaj Mohammad
7	FW	PAL	Zaher Al Samahi
8	MF	LBN	Mohammad Jawad Aabed
9	FW	COD	Plamedi Lukasi
10	MF	LBN	Ali Ezzeddine
11	FW	LBN	Hasan Hawila
12	FW	SEN	Abou Bandia
13	DF	VEN	Karin Saab
14	MF	SEN	Abdou Aziz Diaw
15	MF	LBN	Youssef Atriss
17	MF	SEN	Malick Bamba Dieng

No.	Pos.	Nation	Player
19	FW	LBN	Karim Kassem
20	FW	LBN	Karim Mansour
21	GK	LBN	Shareef Azaki
22	MF	COD	Serge Mukoko
24	DF	GHA	Kofi Asmah
25		LBN	Sami Abbas
30	MF	LBN	Mehdi Saleh
33	GK	LBN	Zaher El Amin
55	DF	LBN	Wael El Youssef
77	FW	LBN	Fadi Zayyat
—	GK	LBN	Afif Zreik
—	FW	LBN	Hadi Chaito
—		LBN	Mohammad Khalil

=== Notable players ===
Players in international competitions
Competition	Player	National team
2000 AFC Asian Cup	Nasrat Al Jamal	Lebanon
2000 AFC Asian Cup	Faisal Antar	Lebanon
2000 AFC Asian Cup	Roda Antar	Lebanon
2000 AFC Asian Cup	Haitham Zein	Lebanon

== Honours ==
- Lebanese FA Cup
  - Winners (1): 2000–01
- Lebanese Challenge Cup (defunct)
  - Winners (2; joint record): 2013, 2018
  - Runners-up (1): 2017
- Lebanese Second Division
  - Winners (2): 1960–61 (South), 2015–16
- Lebanese Federation Cup
  - Runners-up (1): 1999
- Lebanese Elite Cup (defunct)
  - Runners-up (2): 2000, 2001

== See also ==
- List of football clubs in Lebanon
