= Salam Sour SC =

Lebanese association football club

Salam Sour
- Full name: Salam Sour Sports Club
- Founded: 1961; 64 years ago
- Ground: Sour Stadium
- Capacity: 6,500
- Chairman: Ali Nehme
- Manager: Issam Reda
- League: Lebanese Third Division
- 2024–25: Lebanese Third Division Group D, 2nd of 6
Home colours

Salam Sour Sports Club (Arabic: نادي السلام الرياضي صور) is a football club based in Tyre, Lebanon, that competes in the Lebanese Third Division. They play their home matches at the Sour Stadium.

== Club rivalries ==
The club plays the Tyre derby against Tadamon Sour, as both are based in the same city.

== Honours ==
- Lebanese Second Division
  - Winners (1): 2009–10
- Lebanese Third Division
  - Winners (2): 1995–96, 2008–09

== See also ==
- List of football clubs in Lebanon
