= Burj el-Shamali =

Burj el-Shamali مخيم برج الشمالي
- Municipality
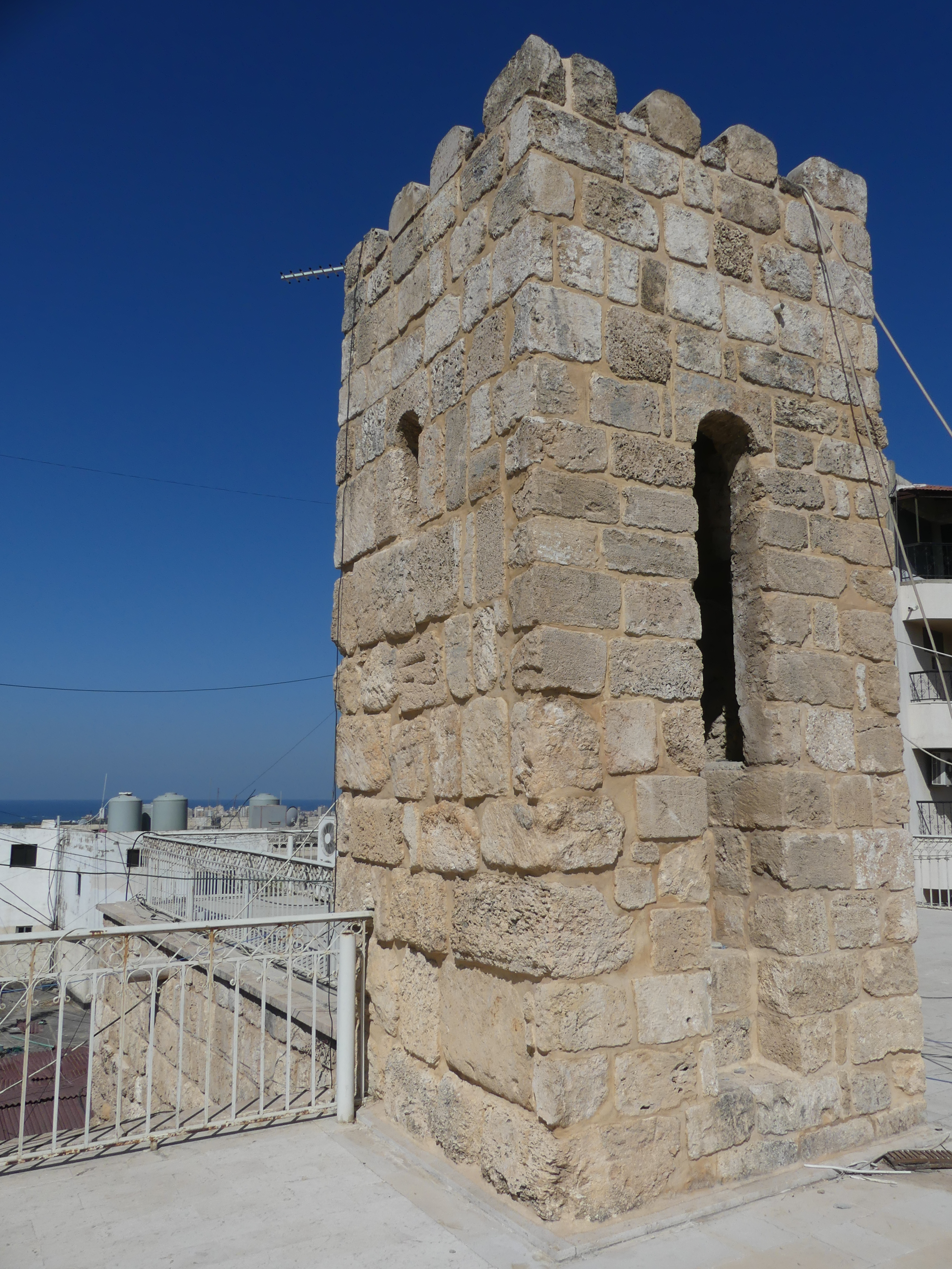
- The Burj; a 12th/13th century Crusader tower, of Burj el-Shamali

- Location within Lebanon
- Coordinates: 33°15′47″N 35°14′20″E
- Country: Lebanon
- Governorate: South Governorate
- District: Tyre District
- Municipality: Tyre

Area
  - Municipality: 1,069 ha (2,640 acres)
  - Urban: 6.8 km^{2} (2.6 sq mi)
- Elevation: 62 m (203 ft)

Population (2016)
  - Municipality: 61,973
- Time zone: EET

Burj el-Shamali (Arabic: مخيم برج الشمالي) is a municipality located some 86 km south of Beirut and 3 km east of the Tyre/Sour peninsula, merging into its urban area. It is located in the Tyre District of the South Governorate of Lebanon.

It is particularly known for hosting the second-largest of the twelve Palestinian refugee camps in the country as a de facto autonomous exclave effectively out of the reach of Lebanese officials: The camp is ruled by Popular Committees of Palestinian parties under the leadership of the Palestinian Liberation Organisation (PLO) which is de facto recognised by the municipality through some degree of coordination and cooperation. The United Nations Relief and Works Agency for Palestine Refugees in the Near East (UNRWA) has the mandate to provide basic services, assisted by local and international NGOs. The Lebanese Armed Forces control entry and exit through the camp's main gate.

== Etymology ==
Burj el-Shamali – also transliterated into the spellings of "Borj" or "Bourj" combined with a version of "Shimali", "Shamali", "Shemâly", "Chemali", "Chamali", or "Chmali" with or without the article "el", "al", "ech", "esh", or "ash" – is commonly translated as "Northern Tower", as done by E. H. Palmer in the 1881 Survey of Western Palestine (SWP).

The settlement is named after a medieval tower on its main hill that overlooks Tyre. The Arabic word "Burj" reportedly originated from the Ancient Greek "pyrgos".

== Territory ==
Burj el-Shamali reportedly covers an area of 1.069 hectare, rising to an elevation of more than 60 metres on a hill overlooking Tyre/Sour peninsula.

Together with the built-up areas of three adjacent municipalities – Sour on the peninsula and the coastal areas to the West, Abbasiyet Sour to the North, and Ain Baal to the South-East – the urban part of Burj el-Shamali (6.8 km^{2)} has integrated into one greater metropolitan Tyre. There are also unpopulated agricultural lands, especially in its Northern and Southern parts. Altogether there are 24 distinct neighbourhoods in Burj el-Shamali. The Palestinian camp is only one of them:

Though Burj el-Shamali is often used as a synonym for the camp, it is important to see that it has just a size of about 135,000 square meters and thus covers but a tiny fraction - little less than 1% - of the municipality's overall territory. While it is less dense than other refugee camps in Lebanon, it is still one of the world's most densely populated areas. A 2017 census counted 1,243 buildings inside the camp and in adjacent gatherings with 2,807 households.

There are five unofficial entrances: former village streets barricaded with cement blocks that allow pedestrians to pass, but not cars. The camp is irregularly shaped, following the property lines of land rented by the Lebanese government for 99 years. [..] When you cross that border, you are in a zone of urban informality. The unplanned streets and haphazard buildings announce that this is a place of legal exception, outside regulation, where a state of emergency is the norm. [..] The camp is divided informally into neighborhoods named after agricultural villages in the Safad and Tiberias regions of Palestine.

The only exception is one neighborhood which is known as Morocco, referring to the North African origin of the residents, whose ancestors moved to historic Palestine during the Ottoman Empire.

== History ==
=== Ancient times ===
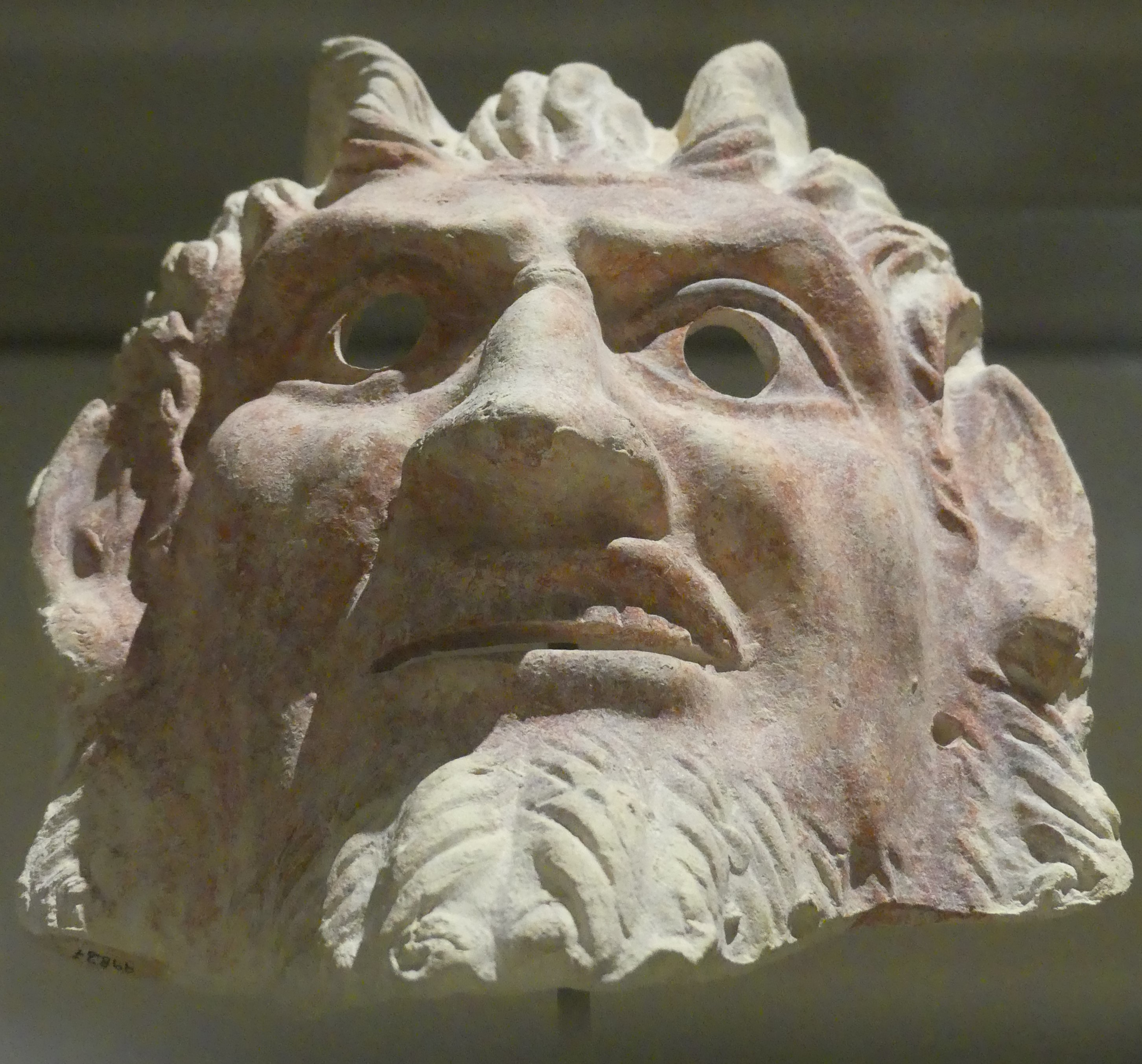
Roman mask of a Satyr from Burj el-Shemali, National Museum of Beirut

According to Ali Badawi, the long-time chief-archaeologist for Southern Lebanon at the Directorate-General of Antiquities, it can be generally assumed that all villages around Tyre were established already during prehistoric times like the Neolithic age (5.000 BCE).

Phoenician stelas and other artefacts found in Burj el-Shemali give evidence that the place was used in the 5th to 4th century BCE for funerary purposes. If there were settlements during that time, they were probably demolished by the army of Alexander the Great, who had all the coastal villages destroyed and the building materials used to connect the island of Tyre with a mole during the siege of 332 BCE. There are indications though of settlements at Burj el-Shemali dating back at least to the first century BCE.

During Roman times, parts of Burj el-Shemali continued to be used as a necropolis. A number of its hypogea - underground tombs - with Roman-era frescos are on display at the National Museum in Beirut. The remains of a Roman-Byzantine road are preserved underneath the modern main road.

=== Medieval times ===
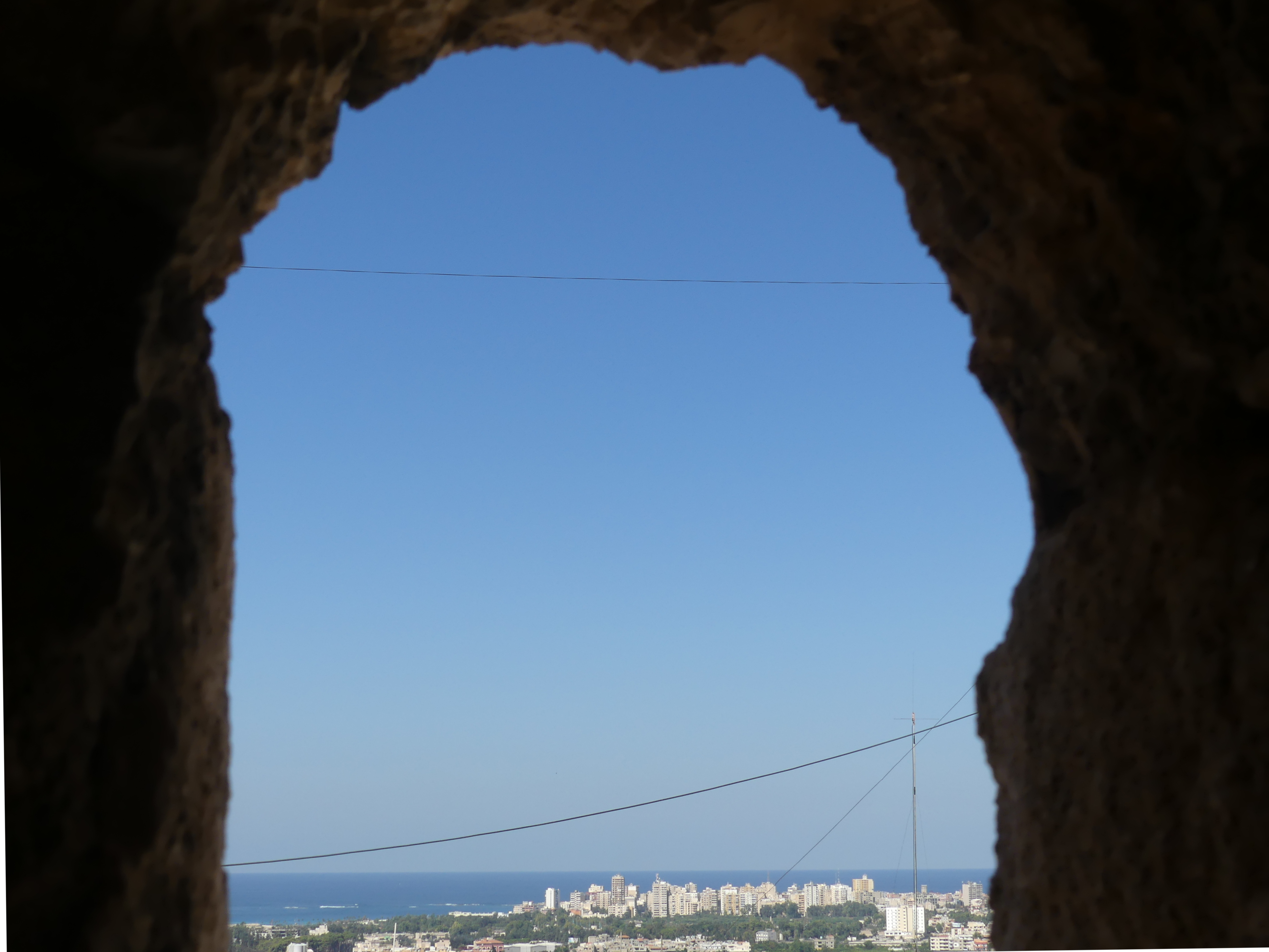
View from the Burj over Tyre

It is not clear whether Burj el-Shemali continued to be settled and/or used as a funerary place after the Arab armies defeated the Byzantine empire in the region and took over Tyre in 635 CE for half a millennium of Islamic rule.

When the Tyre was taken over by a Frankish army in the aftermath of the First Crusade, the new rulers constructed a fortified tower on the hill of Burj el-Shemali overlooking the peninsula of Tyre. The village then adapted its name from that tower. There are also remains of another Crusader tower known as Al-Burj Al-Qobli in the Southern part of town. Like in ancient times, the lands of Burj el-Shemali were used as cemeteries in medieval periods.

=== Ottoman times ===
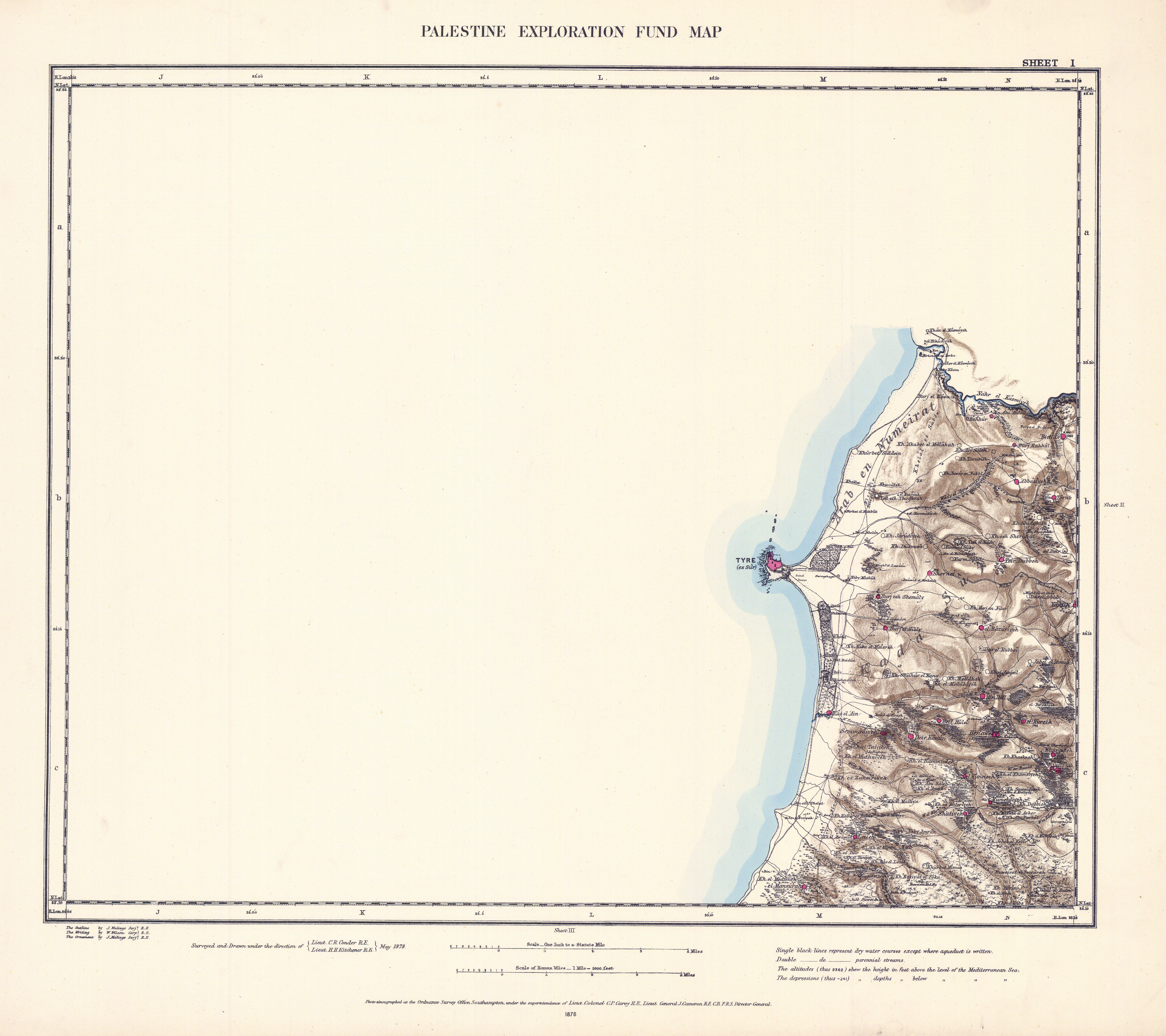
"Burj esh Shemaly" on the SWP map

Although the Ottoman Empire conquered the Levant in 1516, Jabal Amel (modern-day Southern Lebanon) remained mostly untouched for almost another century. When the Ottoman leadership at the Sublime Porte appointed the Druze leader Fakhreddine II of the Maan family to administer the area at the beginning of the 17th century, the Emir encouraged many Metwali – the discriminated Shia Muslims of what is now Lebanon – to settle to the East of Tyre to secure the road to Damascus. He thus also laid the foundation of the Lebanese part of modern Burj el-Shemali demographics as a predominantly Shiite place.

In 1875, Victor Guérin found the village to be inhabited by 150 Métualis. The old fort was divided into several private dwellings.

In 1881, the London-based Palestine Exploration Fund's Survey of Western Palestine (SWP) described it as

A large village built of stone, containing about 300 Metawileh, placed on a low ridge, with figs, olives, and arable land around. There are two good springs near.

and further noted that it was

a village with a similar tower of drafted masonry (as that of Burj Rahal). The hill is crowned by a stronghold, the vaults of which, slightly ogival, do not appear older than the Crusaders, but it was constructed of older blocks, some in drafted masonry and others completely smoothed. About a mile to the south-west of this hill is a subterranean series of tombs, each containing several ranges of loculi, which was explored by Renan.

=== Modern times ===
==== French Mandate colonial rule (1920–1943) ====
Little has been recorded about developments in Burj el-Shemali after the French rulers proclaimed the new State of Greater Lebanon on the first of September 1920:

In 1937, a richly decorated Roman tomb with frescoes from the 2nd century CE was accidentally discovered there in an ancient necropolis area. Two years later, the archaeologist Maurice Dunand had the frescoes dismantled and restored in the basement of the National Museum of Beirut (see gallery below).

==== Post-independence (since 1943) ====
Following Lebanese independence from France on 22 November 1943, Southern Lebanon enjoyed less than five years of peace. The border with British-ruled Mandatory Palestine was still open during those times, and many Palestinian Jews used to spend holidays in Tyre, while vice versa many Southern Lebanese would travel freely to Haifa and Tel Aviv.

===== 1948 Palestine Nakba =====
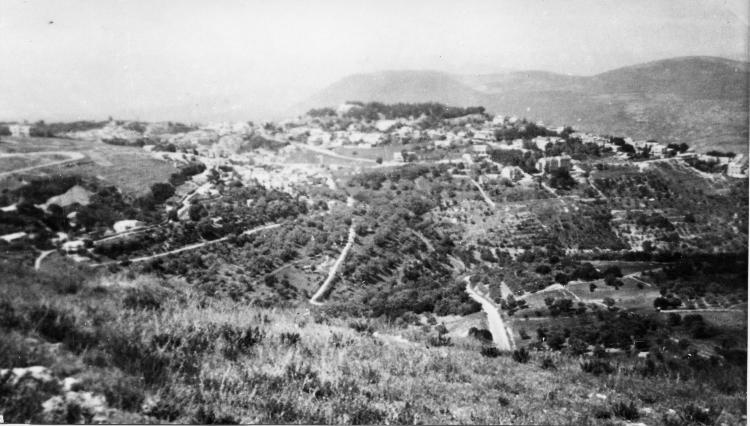
View of Safed from Mount Canaan, taken in April or May 1948 during Operation Yiftach

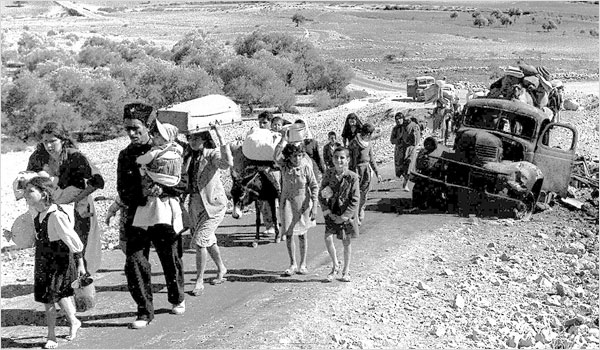
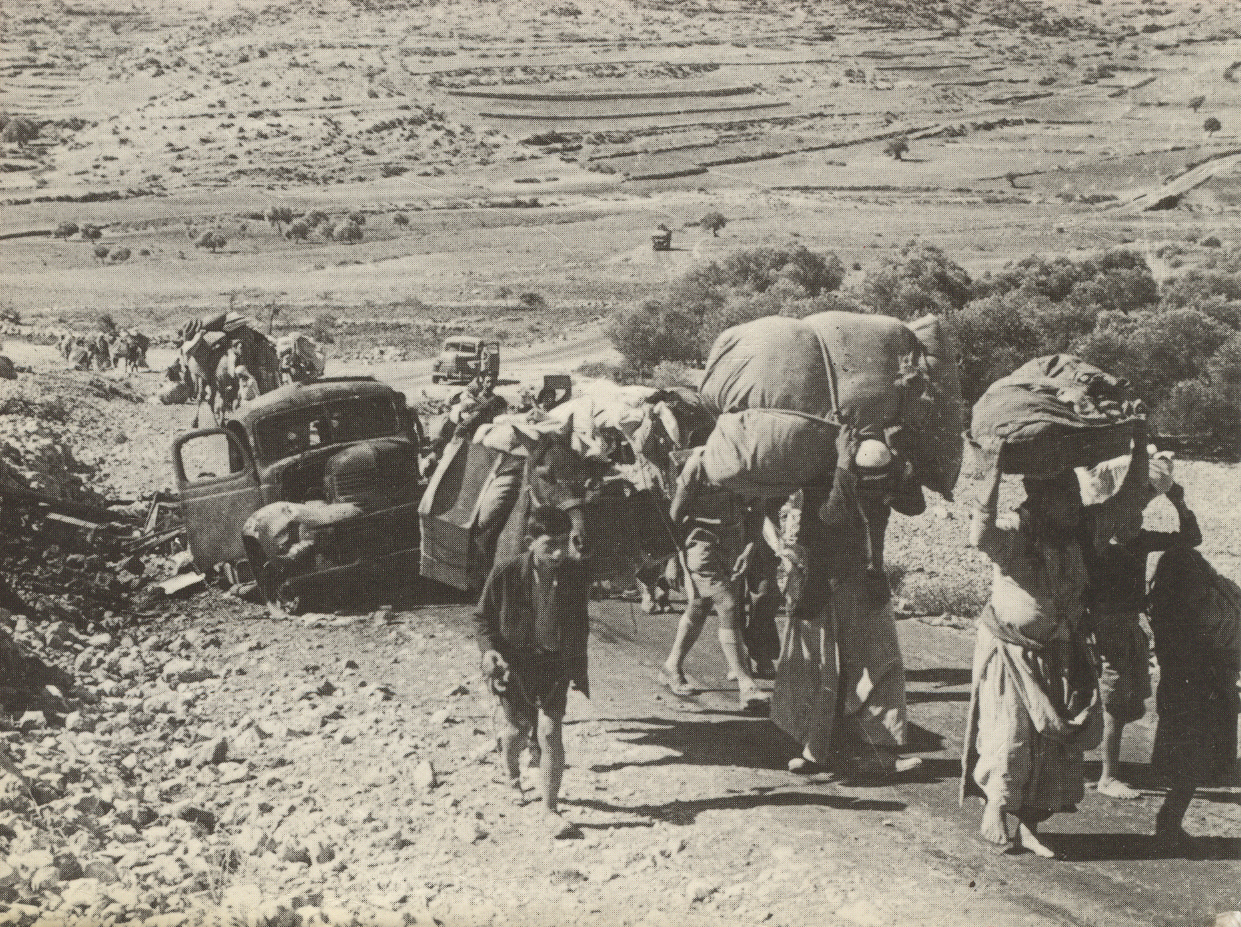
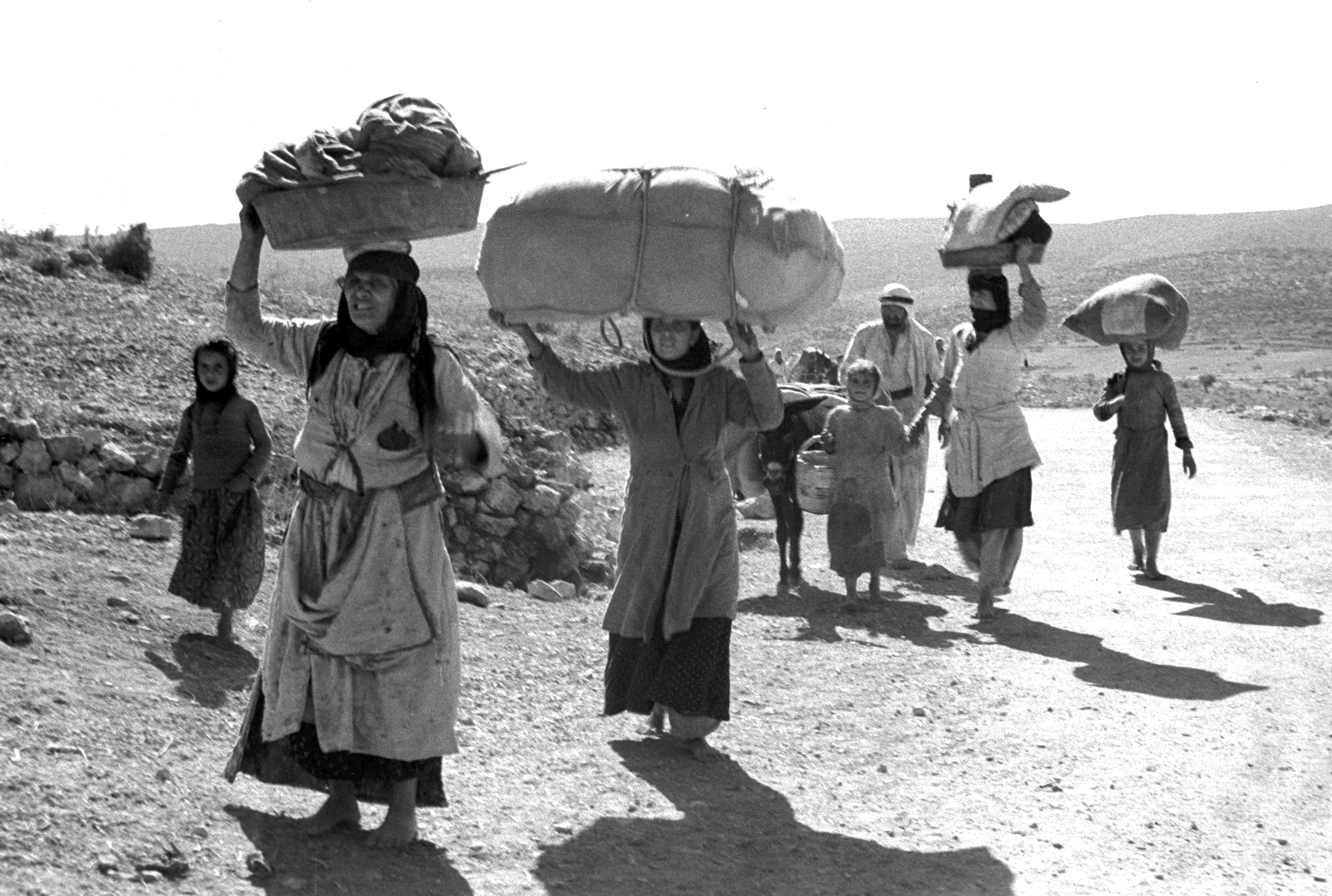
Palestinian refugees making their way from Galilee to Lebanon in October–November 1948

However, when the state of Israel was declared in May 1948, an estimated 127,000 Palestinians fled to Lebanon alone until the end of that year. Confronted with this exodus – also known as the Nakba – a camp of tents was set up in Burj El Shimali by the League of Red Cross Societies. The refugees were mainly from Hawla, Lubieh, Saffuri, Tiberias, and Safed, where they mostly led agricultural existences. An oral history project recorded the following:

Refugees from 1948 often begin their narratives by telling of what used to be cultivated in the past. One refugee family in Burj el-Shemali, for example, began their description of life before the exodus by telling how they used to grow yellow and white corn, wheat, cereals, sesame, big beans, white beans, lentils. There were plenty of vegetables and fruits, apricots, peach trees, plums, grapes, cherries (quite rare in the region), really big and sweet watermelons and honeydew melons."

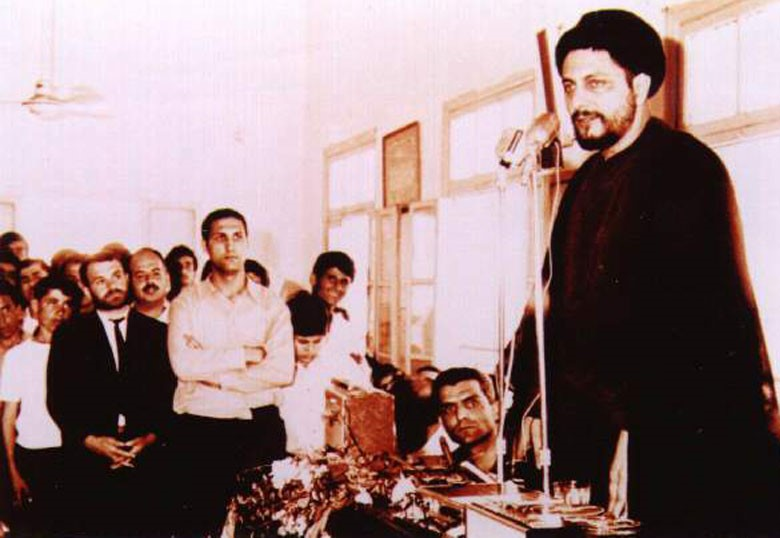
Musa al-Sadr speaking in Tyre (undated)

The refugees at first suffered from particularly poor conditions as the camp was initially only meant to be temporary and became a transit point:

"[It ]was disbanded in June 1949 and its 6,010 refugees distributed among four camps in the Saida and Beqa'a Districts. This operation was carried out in the record time of four days by the League staff in collaboration with the Lebanese Government."

Many of them seem to have moved back to Burj el-Shemali though once the current "footprint" was established in 1955. At that time UNRWA started providing humanitarian assistance – infrastructure services (water, sewage, electricity, road networks and shelter), school education and health care – to the residents of the camp.

Meanwhile, more Palestinian refugees settled in the area of Maachouk – 1 km to the West of Burj El Shemali – on agricultural lands owned by the Lebanese State as a neighbourhood rather than a camp. Its eastern side, which is an industrial zone, as well as the main road's southern side with many commercial activities fall within the jurisdiction of Burj el-Shemali municipality which demonstrates the arbitrariness of many boundaries.

The Tyrian public expressed solidarity with the Palestinian cause in that early post-independence era, especially thanks to the politics of Tyre's long-time Imam and social-reformer Abdulhussein Sharafeddin, who had given shelter to the Grand Mufti of Jerusalem Amin al-Husseini shortly after the beginning of the 1936–1939 Arab revolt in Palestine. After Sharafeddin's death in 1957 the balance of power in Southern Lebanon and the whole country gradually started to shift though with the arrival of a newcomer to the political scene:

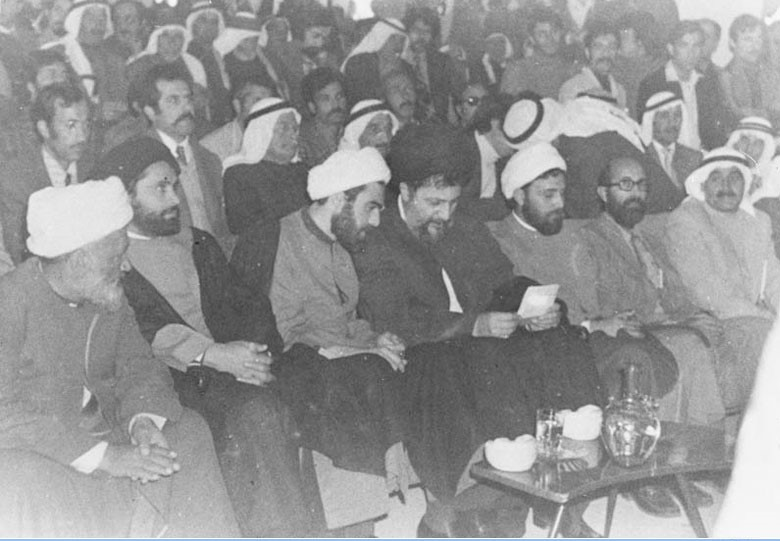
Al-Sadr (centre, in black) with Mostafa Chamran, left

In 1959, the Iran-born Shiite cleric Sayed Musa Sadr moved to Tyre to succeed the late Sharafeddin. As "one of his first significant acts" he established a vocational training center in Burj el-Shemali that became "an important symbol of his leadership". Reportedly, one of the first directors of the institute was a Maronite, while its Iraq-born Shiite principal started military trainings for Shia youth with support from Palestinian fighters at the camp.

By 1968, there were 7,159 registered Palestinian refugees in the camp of Burj el-Seimali. At the same time, during the course of the decade, Greater Tyre metropolitan area, including Burj el-Shemali, increasingly became subject to a rural-to-urban movement that has been ongoing ever since and resulted in growing settlements around the camp.

The solidarity of the Lebanese Tyrians with the Palestinians was especially demonstrated in January 1969 through a general strike to demand the repulsion of Israeli attacks on Palestinian targets in Beirut. However, this sentiment changed during the first half of the 1970s when the local population got increasingly caught up in the crossfire between the Palestinian insurgency in South Lebanon and reprisals from Israel's counter-insurgency.

In 1974, the Israeli military attacked: on 20 June, the Israeli Air Force (IAF) bombed the camp and, according to the Lebanese army, killed 8 people, while 30 were injured.

In the same year, Sadr founded Harakat al-Mahroumin ("Movement of the Deprived") and one year later – shortly before the beginning of the Lebanese Civil War – its de facto military wing: Afwaj al-Muqawama al-Lubnaniyya (Amal). The Iranian director of Sadr's technical school, Mostafa Chamran, who was married to Amal activist Ghada Ja'bar, became a major instructor of guerilla warfare. The US-trained physicist went on to become the first defense minister of post-revolutionary Iran. Military training and weaponry for Amal fighters was still mainly provided by Palestinian militants, but Sadr increasingly distanced himself from them as the situation escalated into a civil war:

===== Lebanese Civil War (1975–1990) =====
In January 1975, a unit of the Popular Front for the Liberation of Palestine (PFLP) attacked the Tyre barracks of the Lebanese Army. While the assault was denounced by the PLO as "a premeditated and reckless act", it launched in March a commando of its own eight to sail from the coast of Tyre to Tel Aviv to mount the Savoy Hotel attack, during which eight civilian Hostages and three Israeli soldiers were killed as well as seven of the eight attackers. Five months later Israel attacked Tyre "from land, sea and air" in a series of assaults over some weeks.

Then, in 1976, local commanders of the PLO took over the municipal government of Tyre with support from their allies of the Lebanese Arab Army. They occupied the army barracks, set up roadblocks and started collecting customs at the port. However, the new rulers quickly lost support from the Lebanese-Tyrian population because of their "arbitrary and often brutal behavior". Even Tyre's veteran politician Jafar Sharafeddin, whose family has promoted freedom for the Palestinians over generations, was quoted as criticising the PLO for "its violations and sabotage of the Palestinian cause" during that time.

In 1977, three Lebanese fishermen in Tyre lost their lives in an Israeli attack. Palestinian militants retaliated with rocket fire on the Israeli town of Nahariya, leaving three civilians dead. Israel in turn retaliated by killing "over a hundred" mainly Lebanese Shiite civilians in the Southern Lebanese countryside. Some sources reported that these lethal events took place in July, whereas others dated them to November. According to the latter, the IDF also conducted heavy airstrikes as well as artillery and gunboat shelling on Tyre and surrounding villages, but especially on the Palestinian refugee camps in Rashidieh, Burj El Shimali and El Bass.

====== 1978 South Lebanon conflict with Israel ======
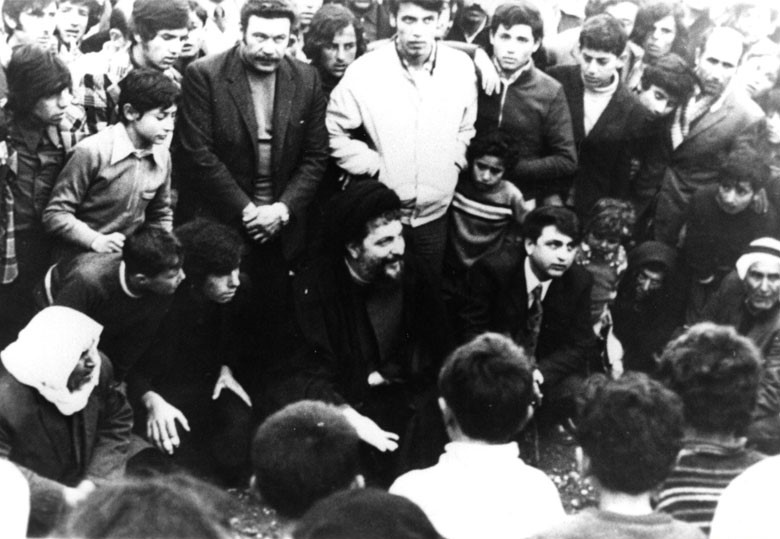
Al-Sadr visiting bombarded areas in Southern Lebanon (undated)

On 11 March 1978, Dalal Mughrabi – a young woman from the Palestinian refugee camp of Sabra in Beirut – and a dozen Palestinian fedayeen fighters sailed from Tyre to a beach north of Tel Aviv. Their attacks on civilian targets became known as the Coastal Road massacre that killed 38 Israeli civilians, including 13 children, and wounded 71. The PLO claimed responsibility for the bloodbath and three days later the Israel Defense Forces (IDF) invaded Lebanon and after a few days occupied the whole South, except Tyre urban area. Nevertheless, Tyre was badly affected in the fighting during the Operation Litani, with civilians bearing the brunt of the war, both in human lives and economically. The IDF targeted especially the harbour on claims that the PLO received arms from there and the Palestinian refugee camps.

On 23 March 1978 the first troops of the newly established United Nations Interim Force in Lebanon (UNIFIL) arrived in Southern Lebanon, but the Palestinian forces were unwilling to give up their positions in and around Tyre. UNIFIL was unable to expel those militants and sustained heavy casualties. It therefore accepted an enclave of Palestinian fighters in its area of operation which was dubbed the "Tyre Pocket". In effect, the PLO kept ruling Tyre with its Lebanese allies of the Lebanese National Movement, which was in disarray though after the 1977 assassination of its leader Kamal Jumblatt.

====== 1978 Musa Sadr disappearance ======
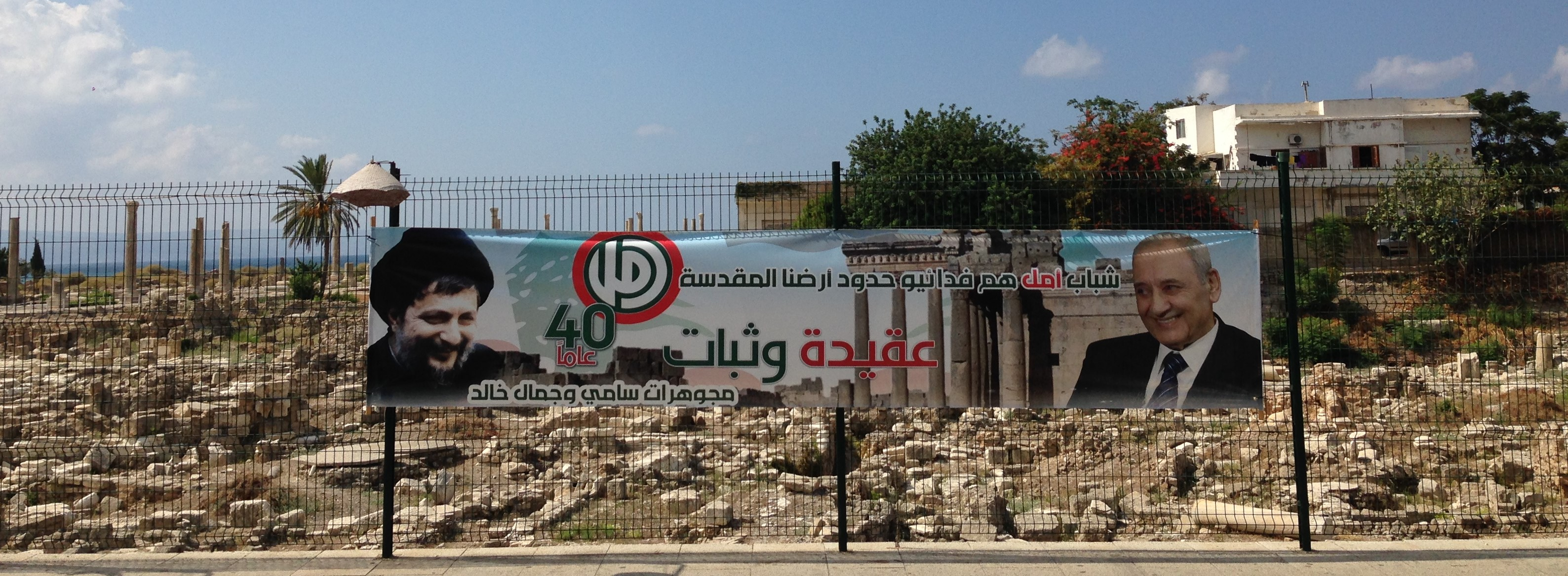
A banner in Tyre commemorating the 40th anniversary of the disappearance of al-Sadr, also depicting Nabih Berri (right), his successor as leader of Amal

Amal founder Sadr mysteriously disappeared following a visit to Libyan leader Muammar Gaddafi on 31 August 1978. His legacy has continued into the present: he has been widely credited with "bringing the Shi'ite community onto an equal footing with the other major Lebanese communities." And while the loss of Sadr was great, it also became and has remained a major rallying point for the Shia community across Lebanon, particularly in Southern Lebanon.

Frequent IDF bombardments of greater Tyre from ground, sea and air raids continued after 1978. In January 1979, Israel started naval attacks on the city. According to Palestinian witnesses, two women were killed in the Burj El Shemali camp, 15 houses totally destroyed and 70 damaged.

The PLO, on the other side, reportedly converted itself into a quasi-regular army by purchasing large weapon systems, including Soviet WWII-era T-34 tanks, which it deployed in the "Tyre Pocket" with an estimated 1,500 fighters. From there it kept shelling into Galilee, especially with Katyusha rockets, until a cease-fire in July 1981.

As discontent within the Shiite population about the suffering from the conflict between Israel and the Palestinian factions grew, so did tensions between Amal and the Palestinian militants. The power struggle was exacerbated by the fact that the PLO supported Saddam Hussein's camp during the Iraq-Iran-War, whereas Amal sided with Teheran. Eventually, the political polarisation between the former allies escalated into violent clashes in many villages of Southern Lebanon, including the Tyre area. The heaviest such incident took place in April 1982, when the PLO (Fateh) bombarded Amal's technical training institute in Burj el-Shemali for ten hours.

====== 1982 Israeli invasion ======
Following an assassination attempt on Israeli ambassador Shlomo Argov in London, the IDF on 6 June 1982 launched what they called Operation Peace for Galilee and once again invaded Lebanon. In Burj el-Shemali - as in many other camps - Palestinian combatants "put up a determined fight". The aerial attacks with phosphorus bombs reportedly killed some 100 civilians in one shelter alone. The total number of non-combatant casualties was estimated to be more than 200 in that camp alone. Estimates of IDF casualties in Rashidieh and Burj El Shimali ranged between 21 and "nearly 120".

The fighting in Burj Shemali [..] continued for three and a half days, during which repeated attempts to penetrate the camp were firmly repulsed."

According to UNRWA, the camp in Burj el-Shemali "was badly damaged" An international commission to enquire into reported violations of international law by Israel during its invasion found that the IDF had destroyed 35 percent of the houses in the camp. Much of the destruction was done "systematically" after the actual combat with Palestinian fighters had stopped.

At the same time, the IDF set up a large compound right next to the Amal technical training center founded by Musa Sadr:

The centre doubled as office of the Amal leader in South Lebanon, Dawud Sulayman Dawud, nicknamed "David David" because of his alleged readiness to negotiate with Israel. He was a native of Tarbikha, one of the five Shi'ite villages in northern Galilee, which were depoluated in October/November 1948, and his Lebanese opponents often called him a Palestinian. Dawud and other Amal leaders did not avoid discreet contacts with Israelis, but refused open clientship. The IDF soon lost patience and arrested thirteen Amal leaders as early as the summer of 1982.

The situation soon escalated further: On 11 November 1982, a suicide-attack with an explosive-laden car destroyed the Israeli military and intelligence headquarters in Tyre. As many as ninety soldiers, officers, and spies were killed as well as an unknown number of Lebanese and Palestinians detainees. As initially nobody claimed responsibility for the assault, Amal came under suspicion as well. In May 1983, the IDF searched the training center and reportedly opened fire on a group of pupils in the schoolyard, killing one boy and wounding nine. Dawud called for mourning strike and threatened resistance.

Then, in November 1983, another suicide-attack on the new Israeli headquarters in Tyre killed 29 Israeli soldiers and officers, wounding another thirty. 32 Lebanese and Palestinians died as well, most of them detainees. Only in 1985 was responsibility assumed for both attacks by an organisation that would go on to become a major player: Hezbollah.

====== 1985 Amal takeover ======
Meanwhile, in February 1985, an Amal member from Tyre launched a suicide-attack on an IDF convoy in Burj El Shimali, injuring ten soldiers. "Israeli reprisals in the area east of Tyre killed fifteen and wounded dozens." The IDF particularly retaliated against Amal's technical training center and Southern Headquarters in Burj el-Shemali, "igniting a new circle of violence." Under the growing pressure the Israeli forces withdrew from Greater Tyre area by the end of April 1985 and Amal took over power there:

The priority of Amal remained to prevent the return of any armed Palestinian presence to the South, primarily because this might provoke renewed Israeli intervention in recently evacuated areas. The approximately 60,000 Palestinian refugees in the camps around Tyre (al-Bass, Rashidiya, Burj al-Shimali) were cut off from the outside world, although Amal never succeeded in fully controlling the camps themselves. In the Sunni 'canton' of Sidon, the armed PLO returned in force.

In September 1986, tensions between Amal and the PLO exploded into the War of the Camps, which is considered as "one of the most brutal episodes in a brutal civil war": When a group of Palestinians fired on an Amal patrol in Rashidieh, the Shi'ite militia put a siege on the camp as well as on those in Al Bass and Burj el-Shemali. After one month, Amal attacked Rashidieh, reportedly assisted by its allies from the Progressive Socialist Party, As-Saiqa and "Popular Front for the Liberation of Palestine – General Command". Fighting spread and continued for one month. By that time some 7,000 refugees in the Tyre area were displaced once more.

Amal [..] overran the unarmed camps of El Buss and Burj el-Shemali, burning homes and taking more than a thousand men into custody.

The siege lasted until January 1988 and caused death for hundreds of Palestinians in the camps all over Lebanon. The number of casualties in the camp of Burj el-Shemali is unknown. The conflict ended with the withdrawal of Palestinian forces loyal to PLO leader Yasser Arafat from Beirut and their redeployment to the camps in Southern Lebanon. The one in Burj el-Shemali likewise continued to be controlled by Arafat's Fatah party and loyalist contingents of other PLO factions, though some forces opposed to them - including Islamists - kept a presence and representation there as well.

In September 1988, the intra-Shia conflict between Amal and Hezbollah had at least one very prominent casualty from Burj el-Shemali: Amal's leader for Southern Lebanon Dawud Dawud, who got killed in Beirut during renewed clashes.

===== Post-Civil War (since 1991) =====
After the end of Lebanon's devastating civil war through the Taif Agreement in 1990, units of the Lebanese Army deployed along the coastal highway and around the Palestinian refugee camps of Tyre, including Burj ash-Shemali. It has continued to be ruled by a Popular Committee dominated by Fatah and other allied PLO-factions, but included other groups like the PFLP.

in 1994 many residents of the camp in Burj el-Shemali seem to have benefited from an exceptional process of naturalisation: while Lebanese citizenship - along with many basic rights - has generally been denied to Palestinian refugees, the government in Beirut now granted passports to refugees and their descendants from the seven predominantly Shia Villages in Palestine and from the Galilee Panhandle. They had been given citizenship of Greater Lebanon by France in 1921, but were attached to British Mandatory Palestine two years later by the Paulet-Newcombe commission. In the 1948 Nakba, many fled to the greater Tyre area and settled in Burj el-Shemali camp. The governmental decree no. 5247 of 1994 provided

an opening for activity in the camp by some Lebanese parties and parliamentarians especially during the parliamentary campaign of 1996 and the municipal campaign of 1998.

In 2004, long-standing restrictions on bringing building materials into the camp were relaxed by the Lebanese government. The camp had already seen an informal building boom since the 1990s, as Palestinians living abroad invested money to improve their family houses or to build their own retirement homes.

====== 2006 War between Israel and Hezbollah ======
During Israel's invasion in the 2006 Lebanon War, Burj el-Shemali was severely hit again:

- on July 9, the Plastimed and Plastic Medical Component Factories were struck in an assault by the Israeli Air Force (IAF);
- on July 16, five civilians were killed by in another IAF attack on a former soap factory, including two children;
- on August 13, another five civilians were killed by an IAF missile, amongst them three children and one Sri Lankan maid.

====== Post-2006 War ======
In December 2009, two men from Burj el-Shemali who were officials of the Islamist Hamas group got killed in a "mysterious bomb attack" in Southern Beirut.

In December 2011, a roadside bomb hit a French UNIFIL patrol in Burj el-Shemali, wounding five peacekeepers and one Lebanese civilian.

According to a 2014 study paper, the majority of Palestinian refugees in Burj el-Shemali supported Fatah. However, it noted that there was – unlike in the other Tyrian camp of Rashidieh – also a considerable presence of Hamas. In addition, the PFLP, the Democratic Front for the Liberation of Palestine (DFLP), and the Islamic Jihad Movement in Palestine were represented in the Popular Committees that rule the camp.

In 2016, the mayor of Burj el-Shemali was Hajj Ali Dib.

== Demographics ==
In 2014 Muslims made up 99.67% of registered voters in Burj el-Shamali. 68.47% of the voters were Shiite Muslims and 31.21% were Sunni Muslims.

=== Lebanese Municipality ===
There are no official figures for the Lebanese and Non-Lebanese population in Burj el-Shemali outside of the camp. Estimates calculated the number to be 22,311 in 1997 and 32,886 in 2011. These figures included Palestinians living around the camp:

Upwardly mobile refugees look for ways to move outside the camp. Nearby apartments in the village are inhabited by the Palestinian middle class: doctors, nurses, teachers, and administrators who can afford higher quality housing but want to remain close to their community and relief services like healthcare and education.

Indeed, despite the clear-cut borders of the camp, some boundaries of territories and cultural identities are much more blurred and fluid. For instance, in 2017 at least, one member of the municipal council was a naturalised Palestinian from Burj el Shemali camp, as he probably originated from one of the seven predominantly Shi'ite villages in Palestine (see above). However, a Japanese study paper found that "many people from other villages as well had obtained nationality by claiming to be residents of the Seven Villages."

After the beginning of the Syrian civil war in 2011 hundreds of Syrian refugees set up tents on public lands of the Burj el-Shemali municipality, but faced short-notice evictions.

In 2016, the total number people living in Burj el-Shemali - including the camp - was estimated to be 61,973.

With further regard to blurred lines between spaces and (self-)affiliations it is noteworthy that there are also many poor Lebanese who have moved into Palestinian camps since rents are relatively cheap there. It is unclear if this is a large phenomenon in Burj el-Shemali like in other camps, but safe to assume that it exists there as well:

=== Palestinian Refugee Camp ===
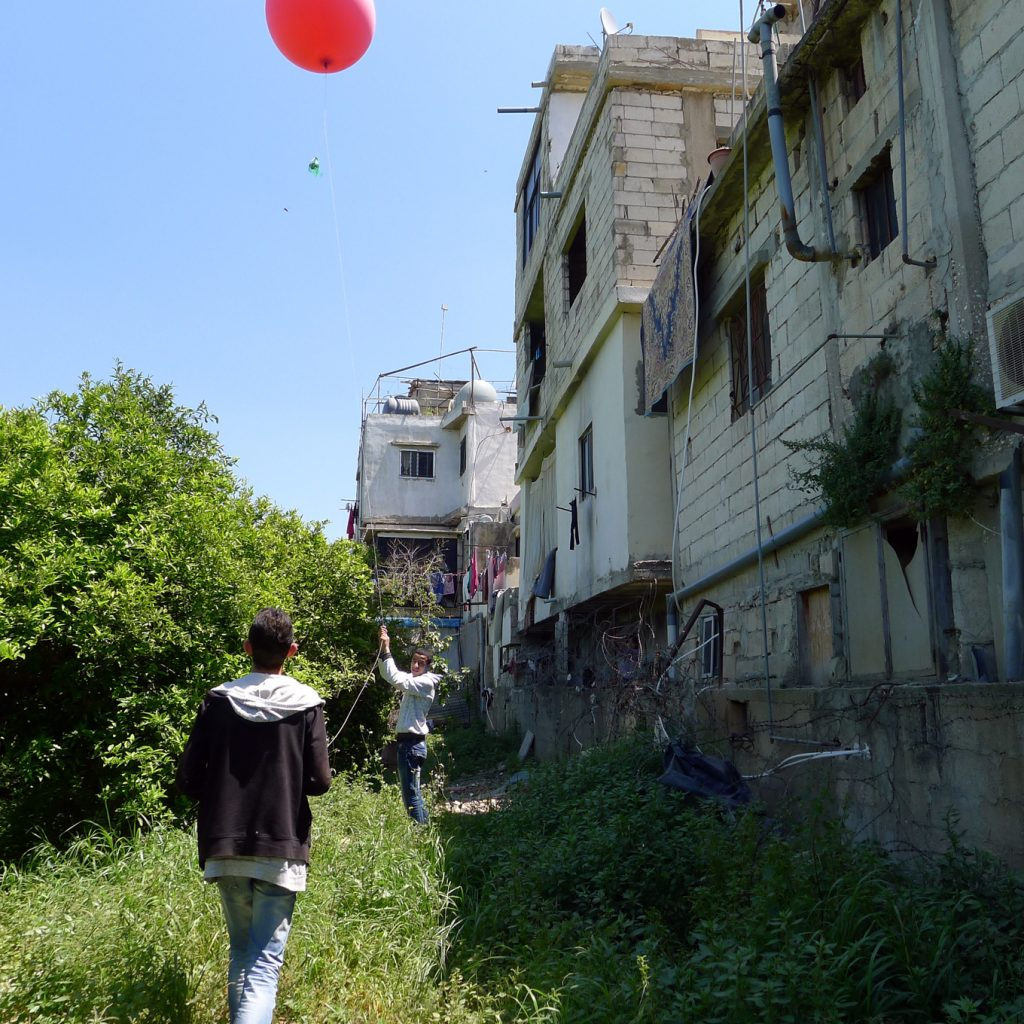
Balloon mapping of the camp during a 2015 project of the NGO Greening Bourj Al Shamali, photo by Claudia Martinez Mansell

The number of registered refugees in the camp has more than tripled since 1968 when the figure was 7,159. By 1982 it went up to 11,256 and by 2008 to 19,074. As of June 2018, this number had grown to 24,929. This increase was mainly attributable to the arrival of many Syrian refugees and – especially – Palestinian refugees from Syria (PRS). In 2016, the official number of Syrians stood at 2,498 and that of PRS at 2416. The already overcrowded living conditions have further deteriorated with the plight of these twice-over refugees. UNRWA describes the situation as follows:

the camp is one of the poorest camps in Lebanon. Unemployment is extremely high, with seasonal agricultural work the most common source of income for both men and women.

However, the second, third and fourth generation refugees have lost the subsistence agricultural existences of their ancestors from Palestine due to the very limited space and denial of land-ownership. The average wage for fruit pickers in the orchards and fields near Tyre used to be around ten US$ per day before the arrival of Syrian refugees who get exploited for less. In 2011 it was estimated that two thirds of the population in the camp lived in poverty.

In addition to these plights, there is a very high incidence of genetic disorders - namely thalassemia and sickle cell disease - among camp inhabitants. UNRWA operates a clinic in the camp. In January 2016, a Palestinian resident suffering from thalessemia set himself on fire to protest against new healthcare regulations by UNRWA. These demanded patients to pay for a minor part of their hospital expenses and also ended coverage for Palestinians with Lebanese nationality or dual citizenship. Already almost two decades earlier, a fact-finding mission of the Danish Immigration Service reported that UNRWA aid had been scaled down.

The Danish researchers were also told by various sources that many residents at Burj el Shemali camp were Shiites and had been granted Lebanese nationality in 1994. However, a lot of them seem to have moved out of the camp since then. While it was estimated that there were some 600 inhabitants with Lebanese citizenship around 2010, their number reportedly went down to just "a few" Shiite families and only one Christian family by 2016.

More than half of the population is under eighteen years old. Poverty has pushed a lot of residents to sell their belongings in search for a better future abroad.

Many families rely on funds from relatives abroad, and young people dream of emigrating. The hottest gossip is about migration routes and costs, and which mafia groups to trust along the way. Everyone shares stories of those who have made it to Europe.

Foreigners need a permit from the military intelligence to enter the camp:

The permit system deters curious strangers and helps authorities monitor the population. It also makes the camp feel like an open-air prison.

== Education and cultural life ==
In the Palestinian refugee camp, the PLO has funded the construction of a large community center, including a youth-center and a kindergarten. UNRWA operates a women's center and schools. In addition, there are a number of other centers for young people offering educational activities, some run by Islamic organisations. A bagpipe troupe was founded in 1996, named "Guirab" after one of the Arabic words for the instrument. It has conducted several concert tours in Europe. In the late 2010s, it had some 20 male and female members who practised in a community center run by the Palestinian NGO Beit Atfal Assumoud.

A 2010 study found that the camp had a population that was "less westernized" than in other camps but "tolerant".

== Gallery ==
=== Exhibits at the National Museum of Beirut ===
==== Funerary items ====
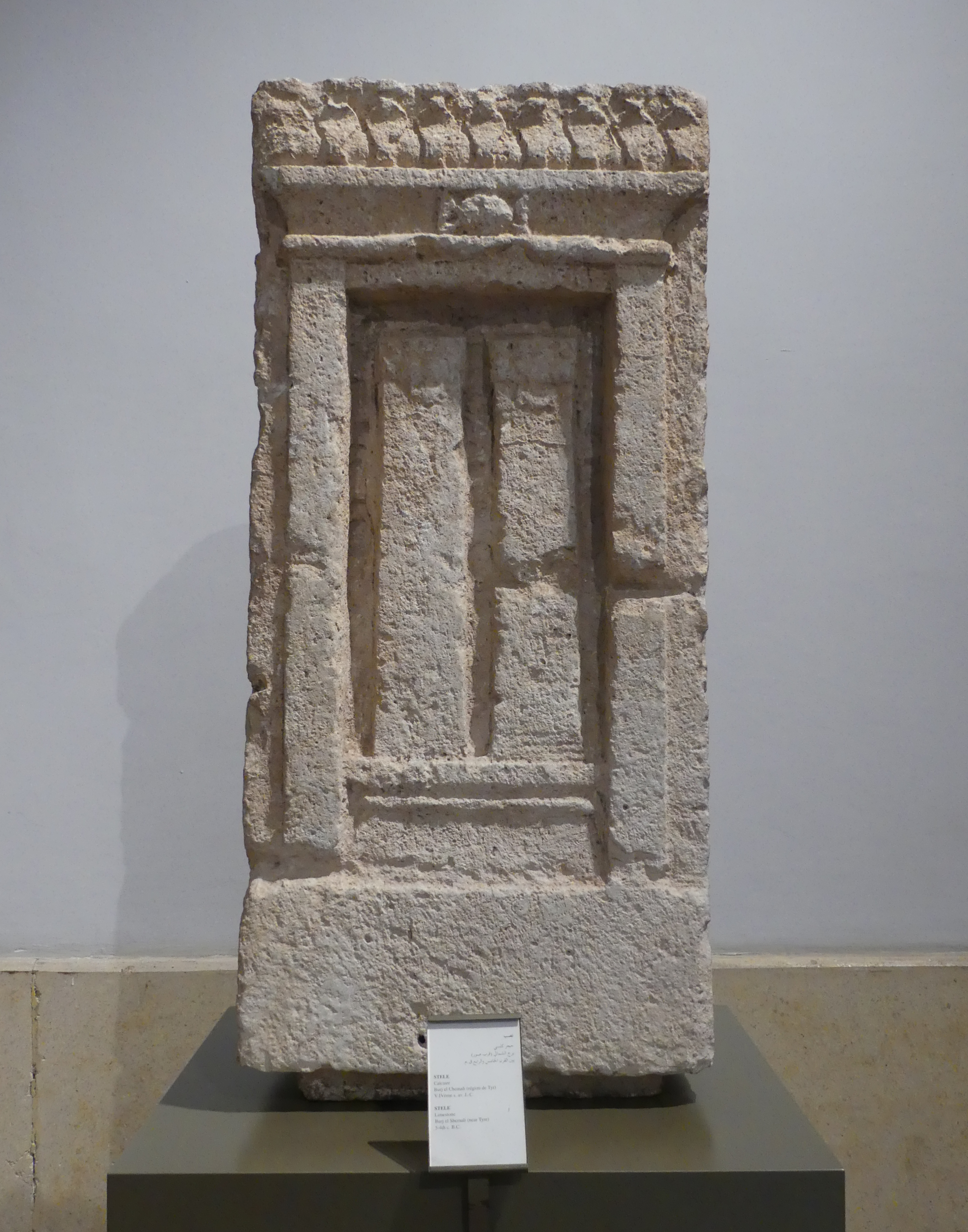
Limestone stele, 5th to 4th century BCE

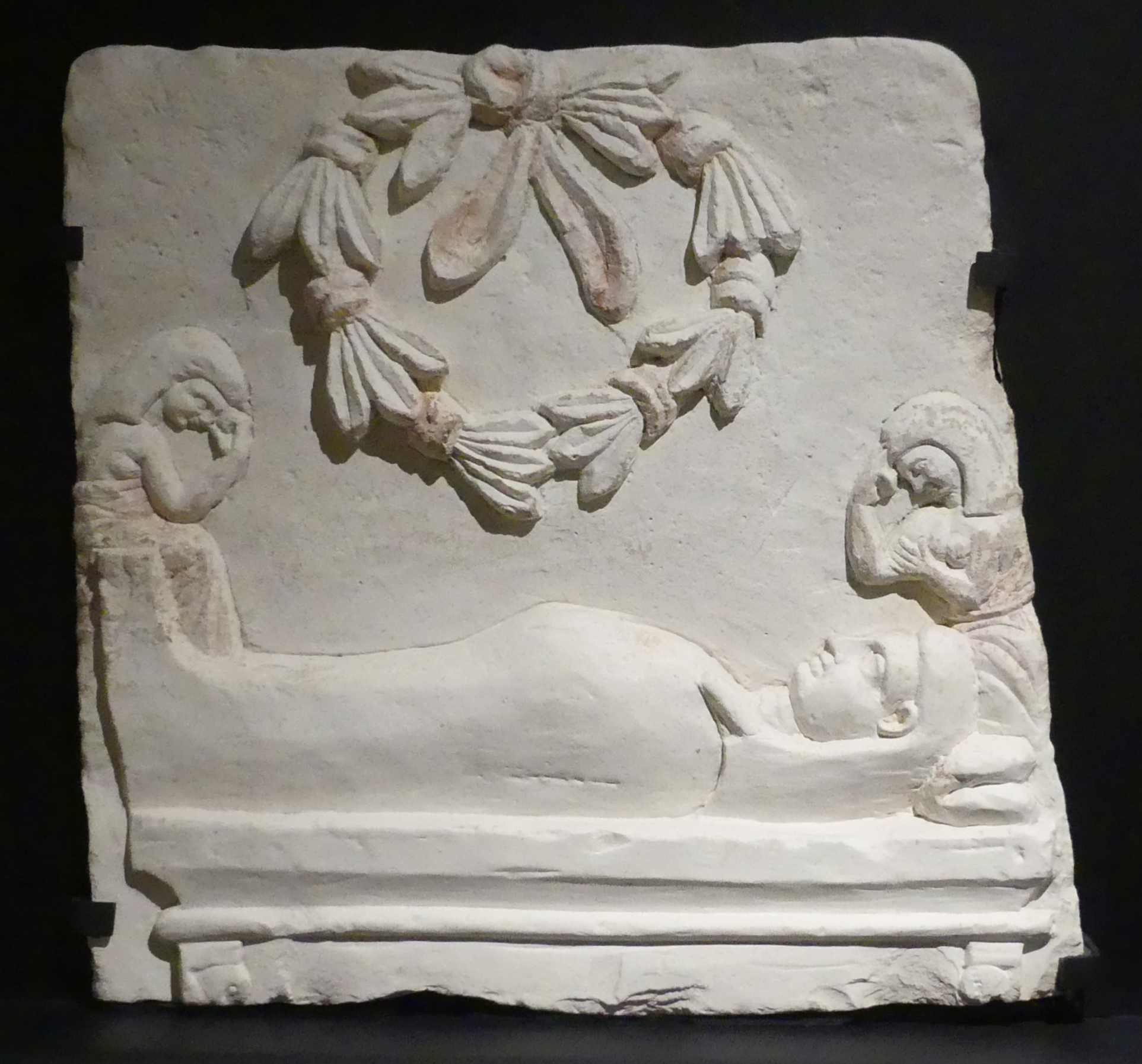
Relief depicting a deceased person with a sheathed body, 550-333 BCE

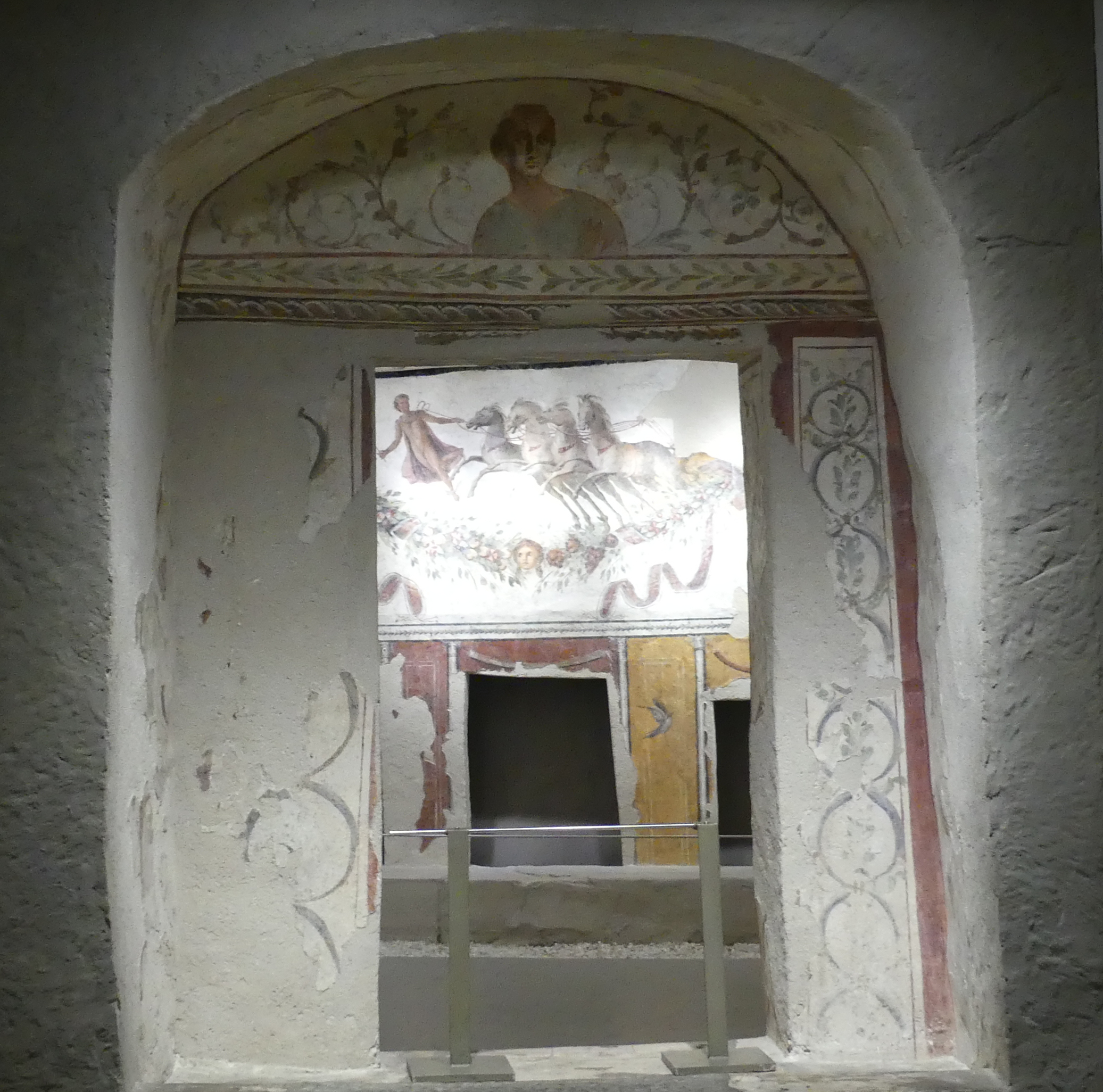
Roman tomb with frescoes from the 2nd century CE

==== Terracotta Mask of a Satyr painted in red ====
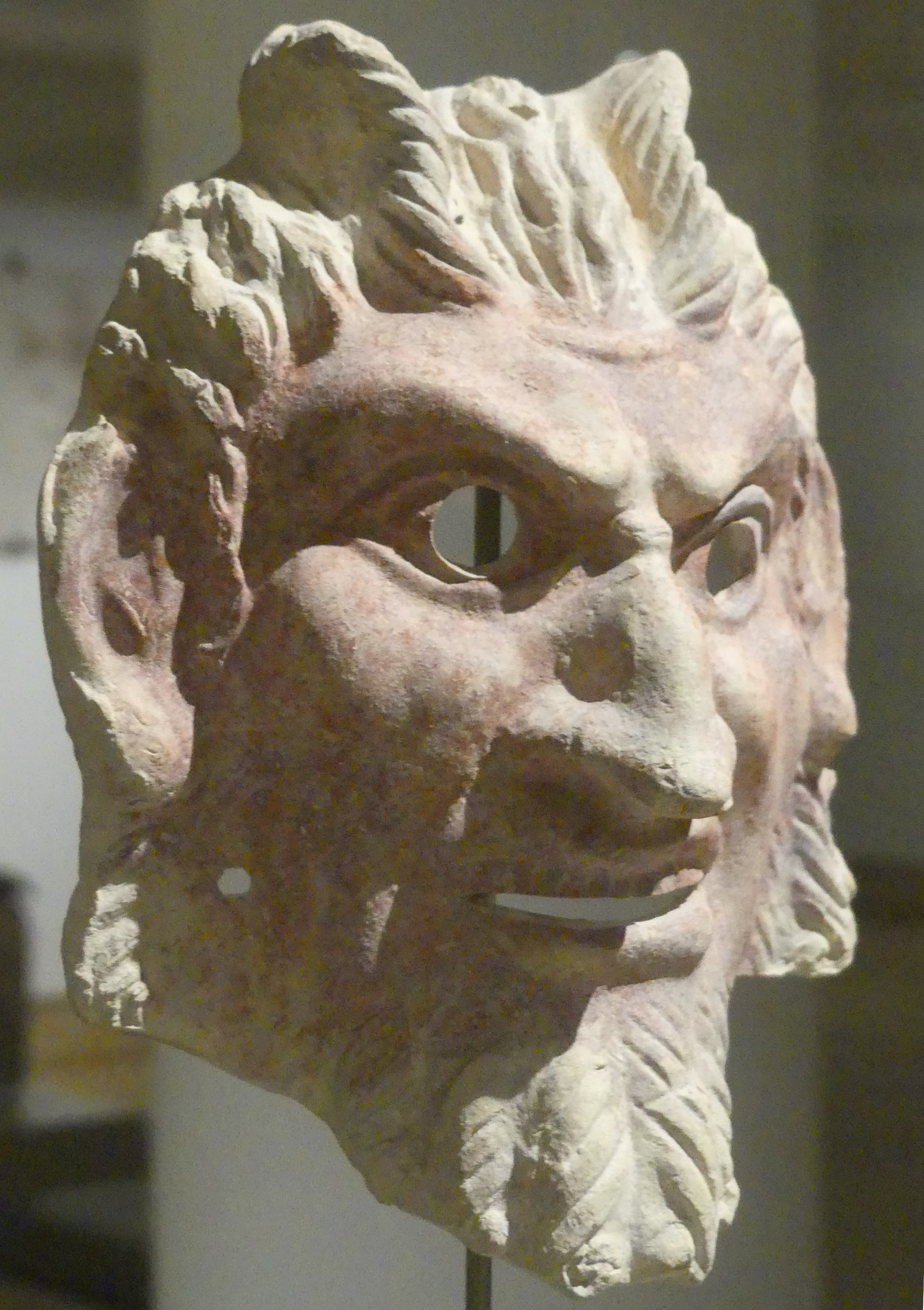

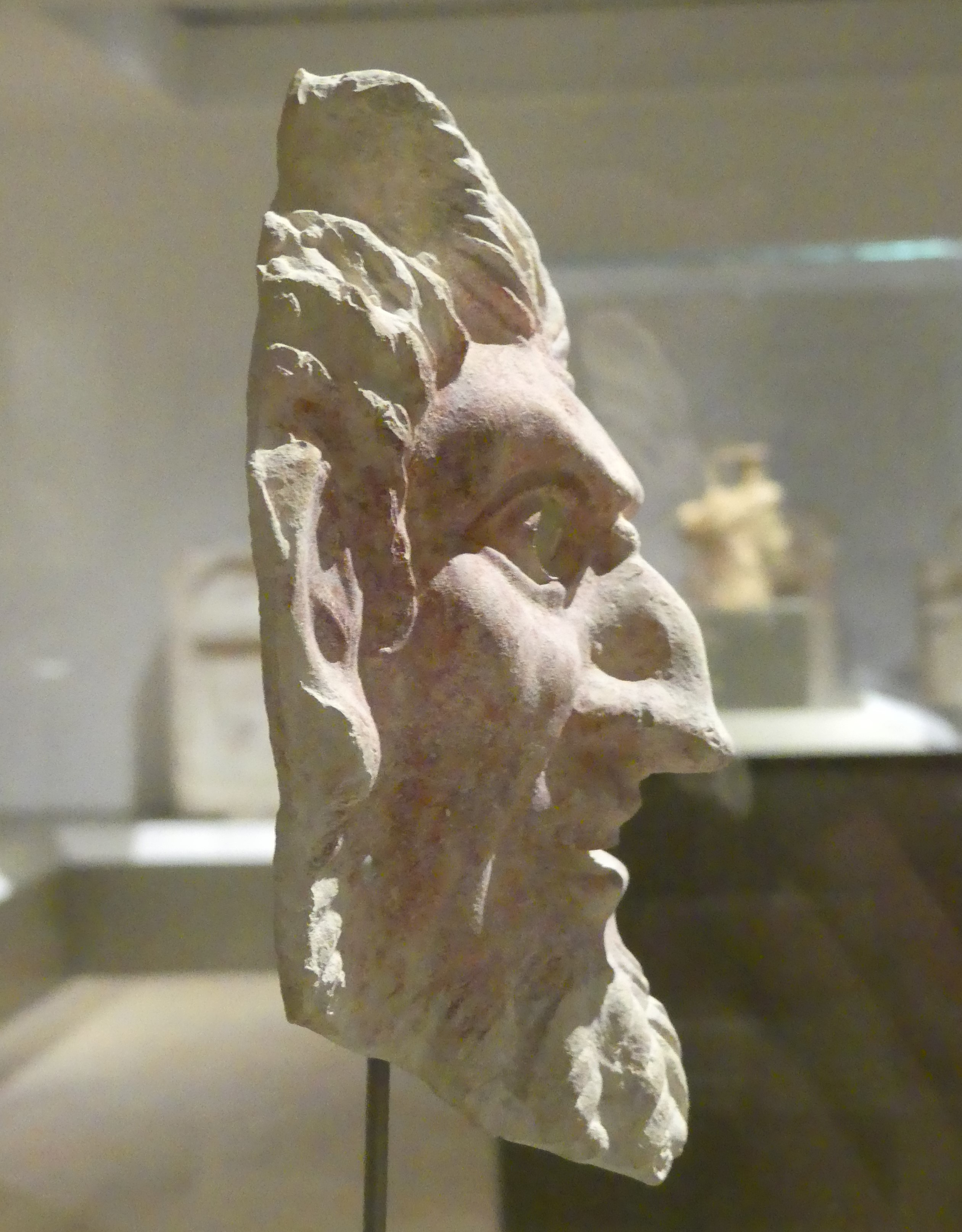

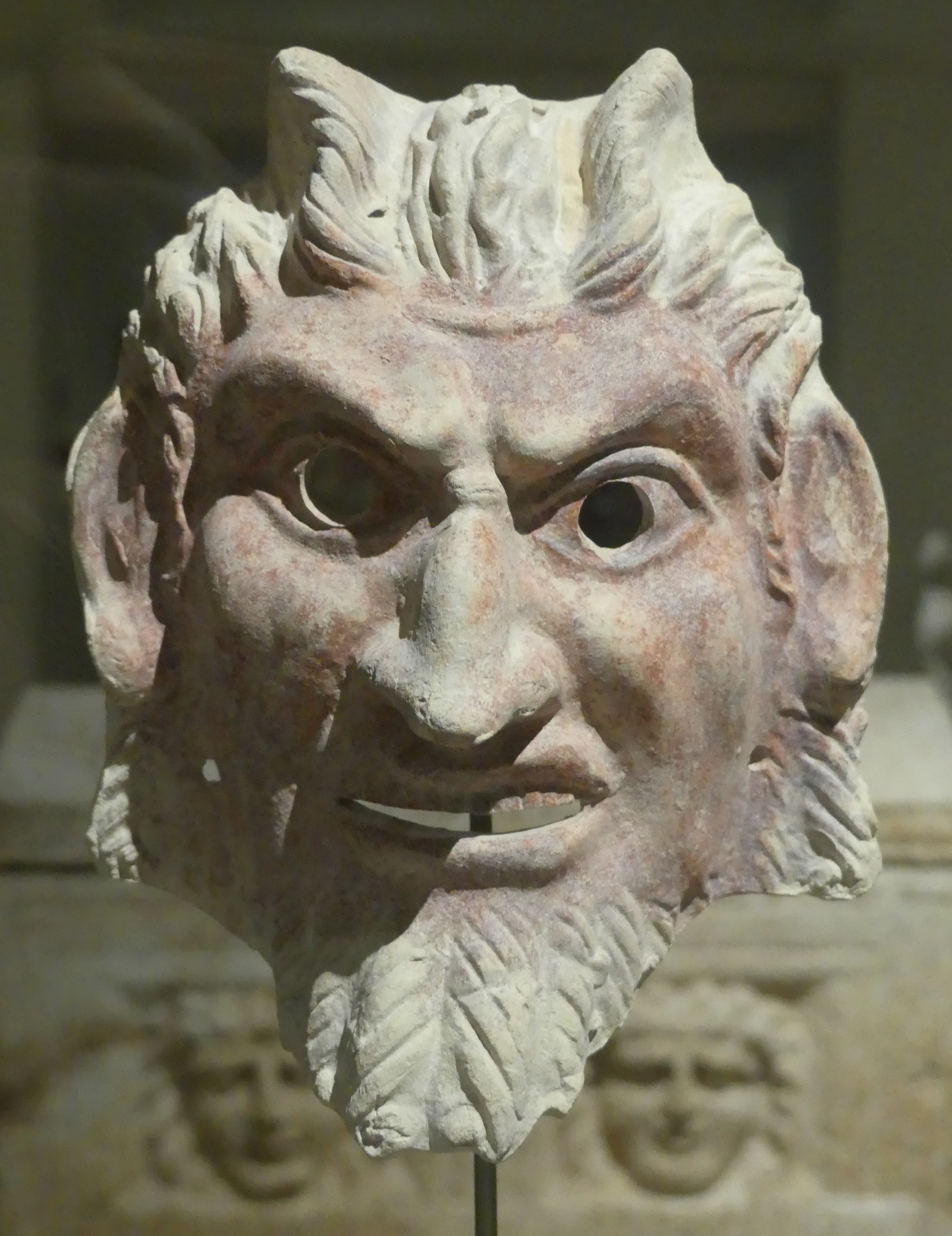

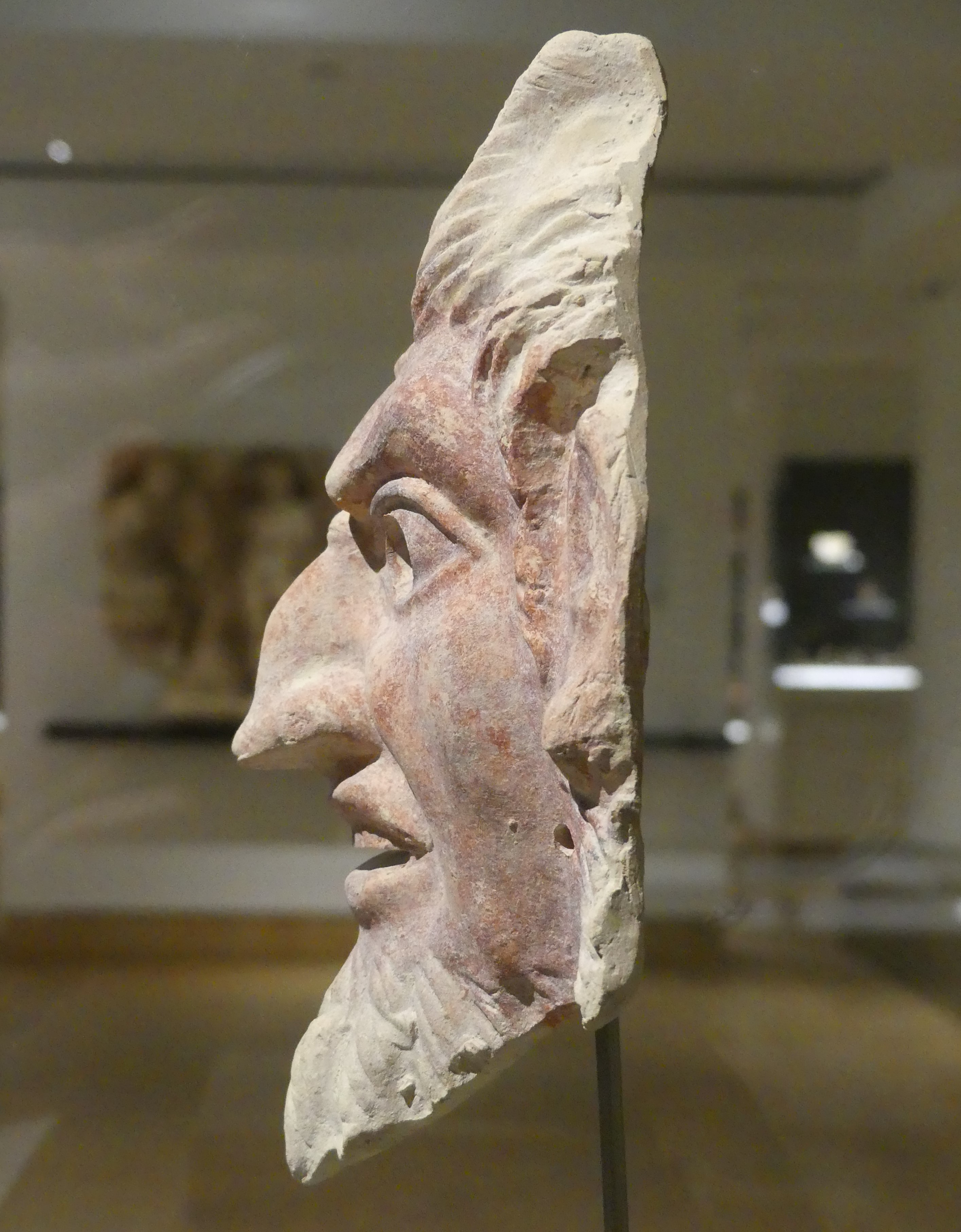

=== Crusader tower ===
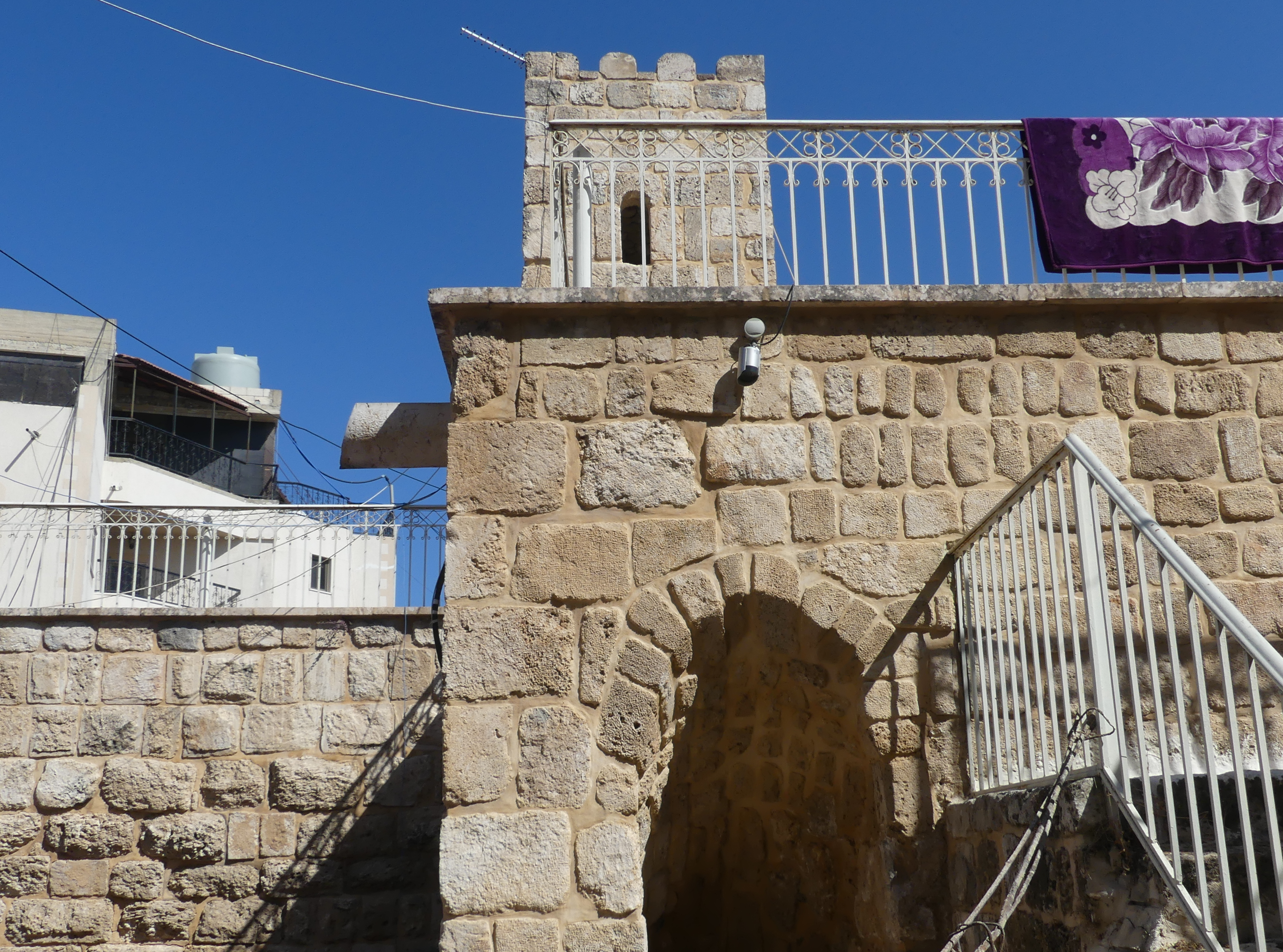

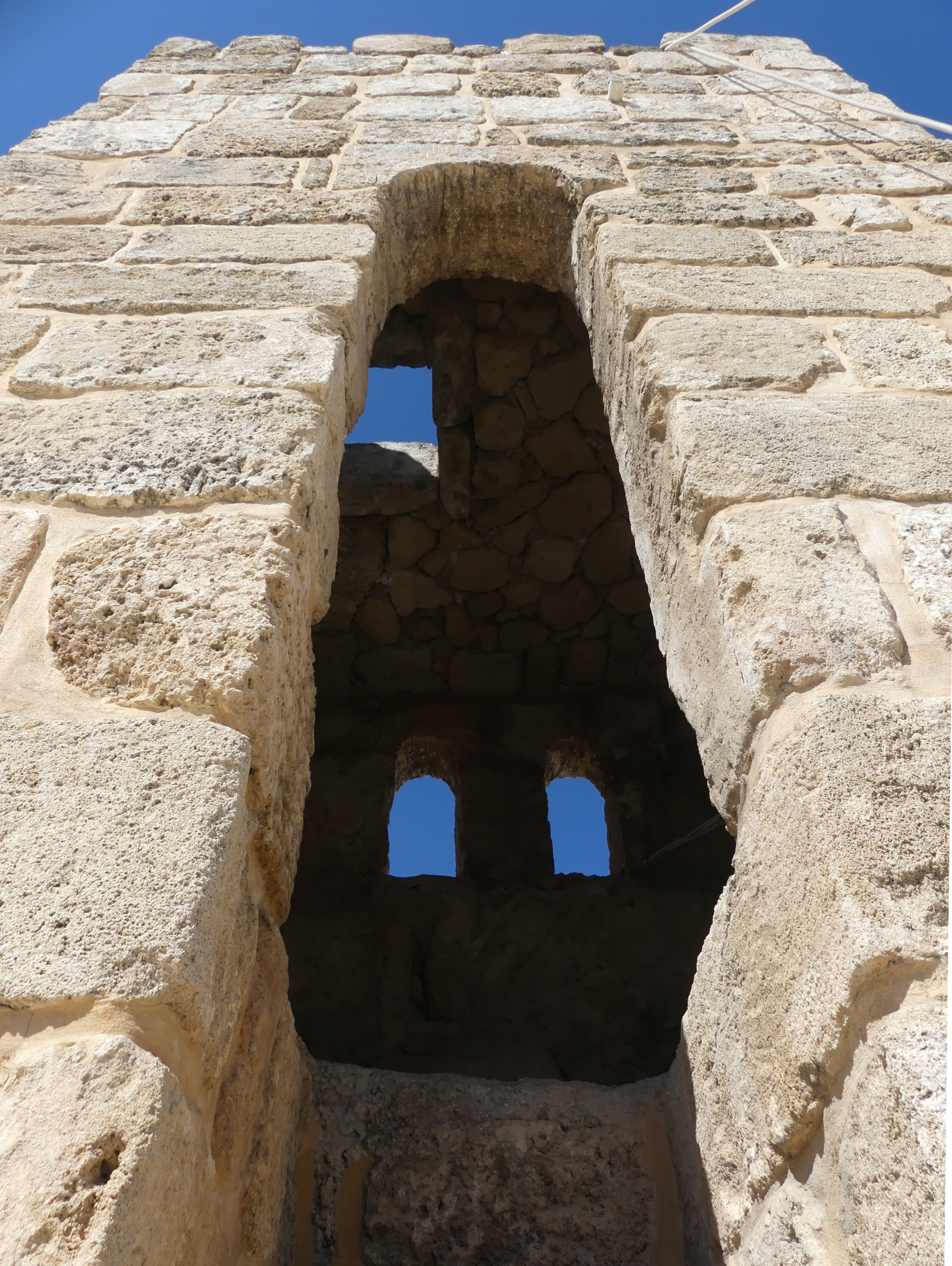

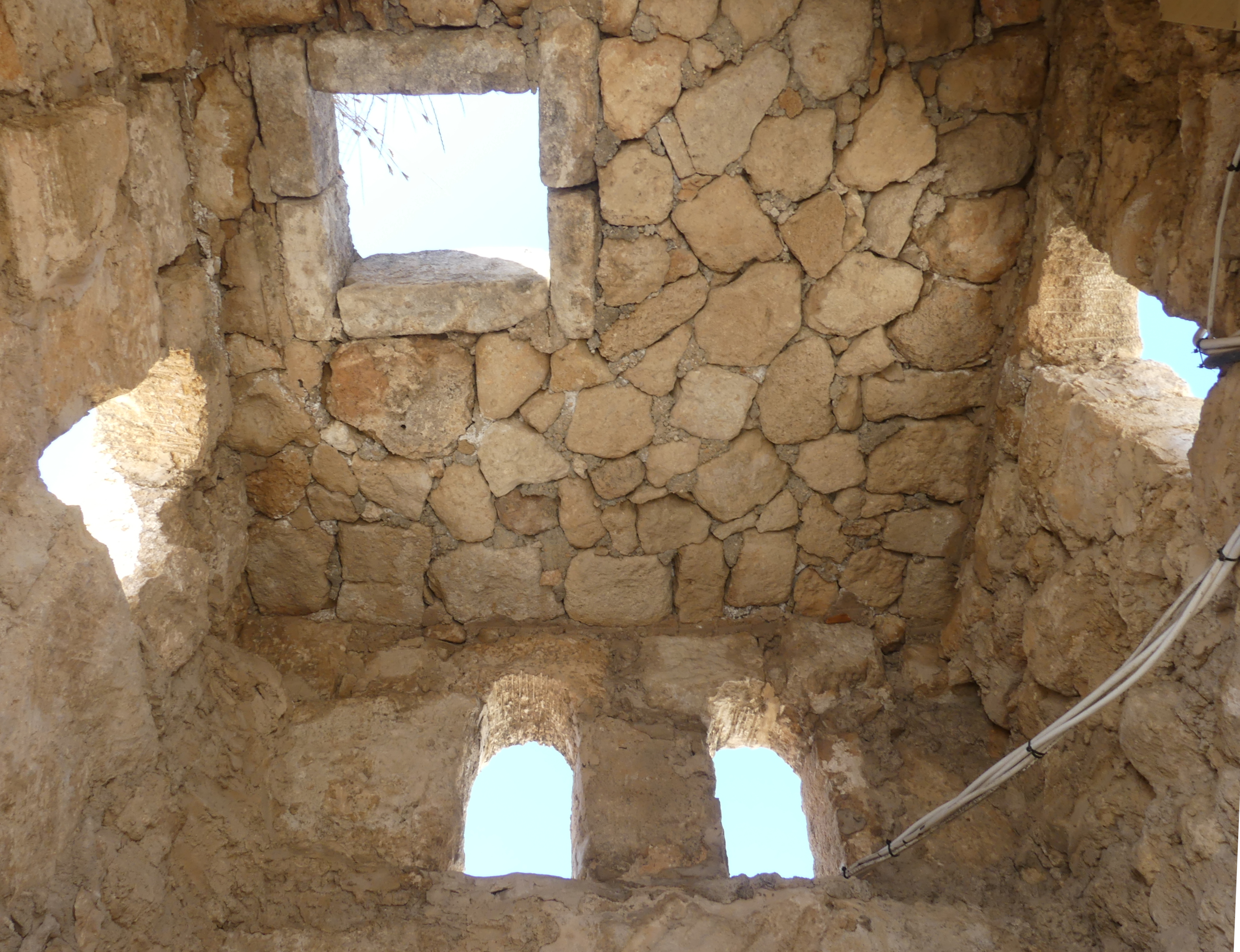

== See also ==
- Palestinians in Lebanon
