= Football in Syria =

- Country: Syria
- Governing body: Syrian Football Association
- National team: Syria
- Nicknames: Nosour Qasioun (Arabic: نسور قاسيون; French: Les aigles de Qasyoun)
- First played: 1900s

Club competitions
- Syrian Premier League; Syrian League 1st Division; Syrian Cup; Syrian Super Cup

International competitions
- List: Clubs; AFC Champions League: Runners-up in 2006 (Al-Karamah SC); AFC Cup: Champions in 2004 (Al-Jaish SC) and in 2010 (Al-Ittihad SC); National team; AFC Asian Cup (2023): Round of 16; WAFF Championship (2012): Champions; FIFA Arab Cup (1963, 1966, 1988): Runners-up; Mediterranean Games (1987): Champions; National U-23 team; AFC U-23 Championship (2013, 2020): Quarter-final; National U-20 team; FIFA U-20 World Cup (1991): Quarter-final; AFC U-20 Championship (1994): Champions; National U-17 team; FIFA U-17 World Cup (2007): Round of 16; AFC U-16 Championship (2014): Semi-final; Women's national team; WAFF Women's Championship (2005, 2022): Third place; Arab Women's Cup (2006): Group stage; Women's national U-20 team; WAFF U-18 Girls Championship (2022): Runners-up; Women's national U-16 team; WAFF U-16 Girls Championship (2023): Champions; Women's national U-14 team; WAFF U-14 Girls Championship (2023): Champions

The sport of football in the country of Syria is run by the Syrian Arab Federation for Football. The association administers the national football team as well as the Syrian Premier League. Football is the most popular sport in the country. Approximately 30% of the people in Syria are considered association football fans.

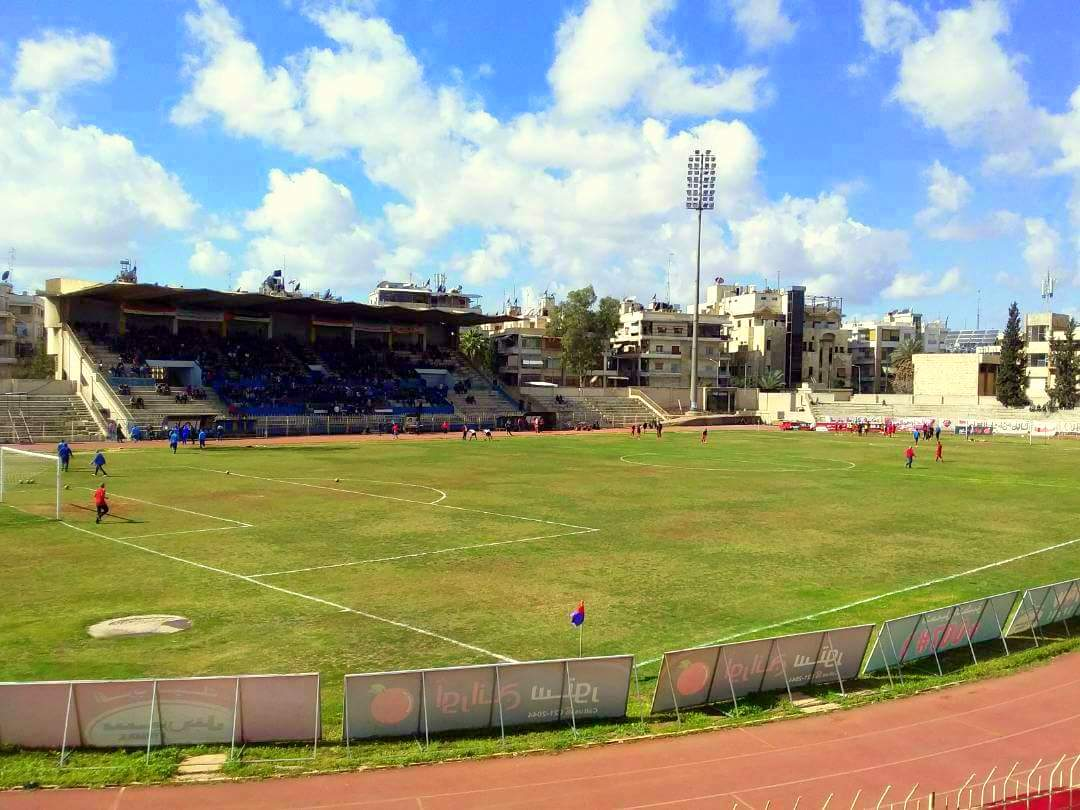
Ri'ayet al-Shabab Stadium in Aleppo.

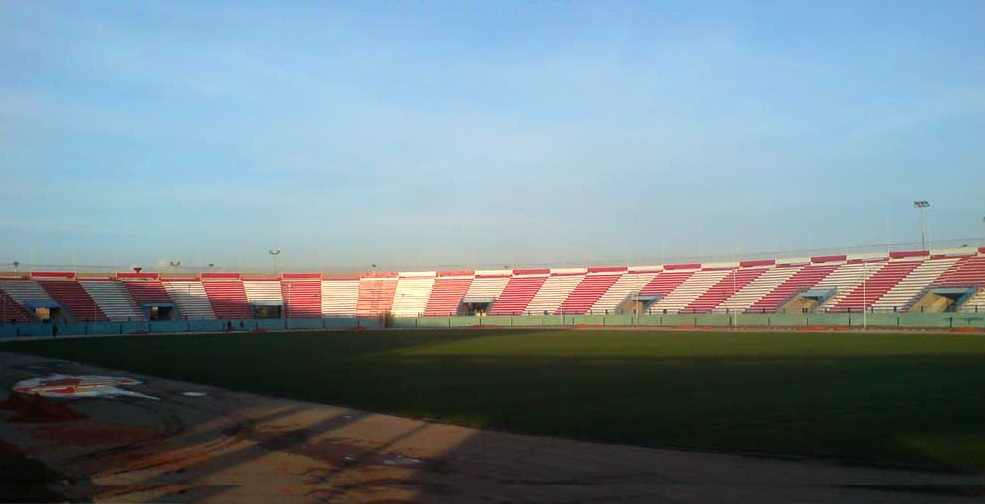
Al-Hasakah Municipal Stadium in Al-Hasakah.

Tishreen SC, Al Wahda SC, Al-Jaish SC and Al-Ittihad are amongst the most popular clubs in the country. All teams compete in the Syrian Premier League, the highest tier of Syrian football.

== Domestic football ==
On 27 November 2004, Al-Jaish won the 2004 AFC Cup. Al Jaish was the first Syrian club to win a continental title. The final opponent was Al Wahda, facing two Syrian clubs in the final. Both games took place in Abbasiyyin Stadium. Both clubs participated in 2005 in the AFC Champions League.

In the Arab Club Champions Cup and the Arab Cup Winners' Cup forerunners of the Arab Champions League, it was Al Jaish who held up the banner of Syrian club football: between 1998 and 2000, the finals were scored twice in both competitions. but had to be defeated every four times.

In the Asian Champions League (AFC Champions League), Al-Karamah achieved the 2006 AFC Champions League second place. The team lost in the final to Jeonbuk Motors of South Korea (2–0 in Korea, 2–1 at home). In 2009, Al-Karama reached the AFC Cup final, but lost 1–1 to Al-Kuwait in the 2009 AFC Cup. Al-Ittihad won the 2010 AFC Cup against Al-Qadsia to become the second Syrian team to win the AFC Cup trophy.

== Stadiums ==
Syria has a total of 35 football stadiums spread around the country. The main stadium used to be Abbasiyyin Stadium in Damascus, but when the Aleppo International Stadium was built, it replaced it.

== National team ==
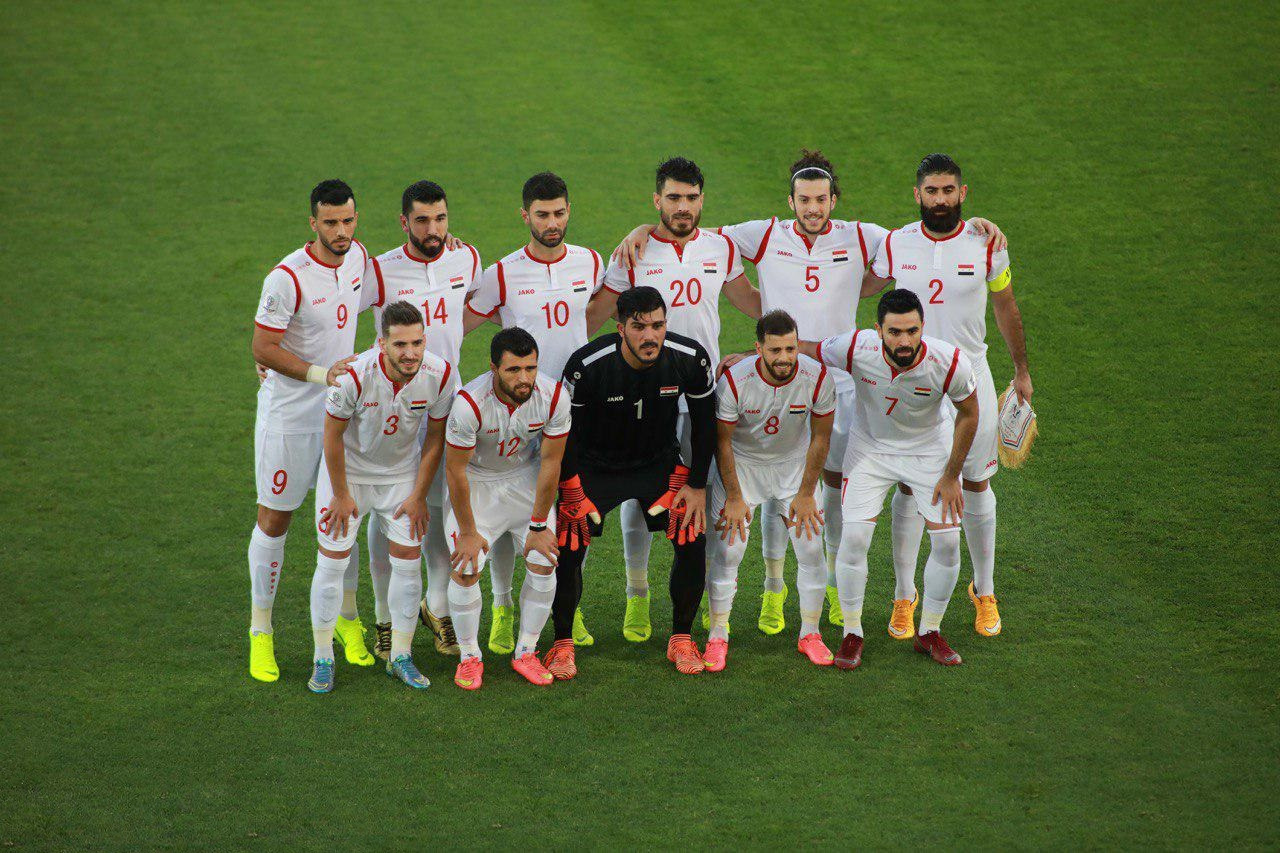
Syrian national team before 2019 AFC Asian Cup match against Australia

The Syrian national team won the 1957 Pan Arab Games, 1987 Mediterranean Games and 2012 WAFF Championship, yet has never qualified for a football World Cup. Even in the Asian Cup so far succeeded little. The youth selection participated three times (1989, 1995 and 2005) at the FIFA Youth World Cup and in 2005 reached the knockout stages. Syria U20 managed to win the 1994 AFC Youth Championship by beating Japan U20 2–1 in the final. The U-17 selection of the country qualified in 2007 for the World Cup in this age group and was also able to celebrate the knockout stages. In addition to the senior national team of men and various youth teams, there is also a women's national team.

== Women's football ==
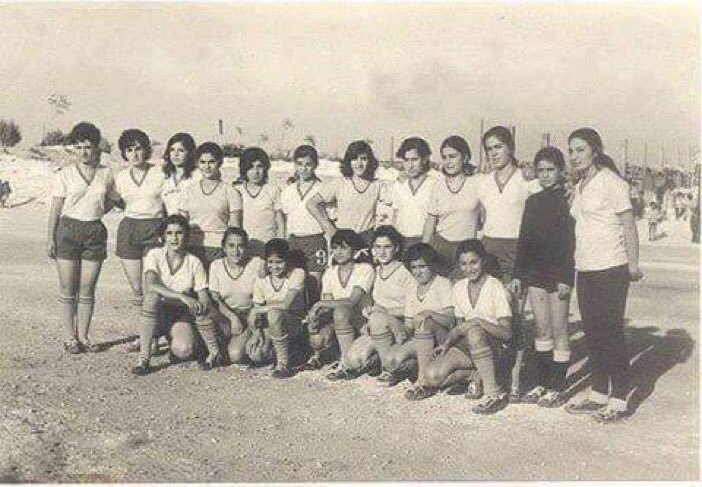
The first women's football team in Syria and the Middle East (Aleppo, 1950)

The first women's football team in Syria, the Levant and the Middle East was founded in Aleppo in 1950. For a long time there was neither an organized women's league nor an organized cup competition.

Since the end of July 2006, the first official Syrian women's football championship runs in the form of a league with 7 teams. In addition, there is a women's national team, which, however, has not played any official international matches at FIFA level until the 2018 AFC Women's Asian Cup qualification.

== Attendances ==
The average attendance per top-flight football league season and the club with the highest average attendance:

Season	League average	Best club	Best club average
2023–24	1,577	Al-Karamah	3,781

Source: League page on Wikipedia

== See also ==
- List of football stadiums in Syria
- List of football clubs in Syria
