= 2005 AFC Cup =

2nd secondary club football tournament organized by the

Tournament details
- Dates: 9 March – 26 October 2005
- Teams: 18 (from 9 associations)

Final positions
- Champions: (Jordan) Al-Faisaly (1st title)
- Runners-up: (Lebanon) Nejmeh

Tournament statistics
- Matches played: 62
- Goals scored: 167 (2.69 per match)
- Top scorer(s): (Jordan) Mo'ayyad Salim (9 goals)

The 2005 AFC Cup was the second edition of the AFC Cup, played amongst clubs from nations of the AFC, who are considered to be 'developing countries' as per the 'Vision Asia' members paper of AFC President Mohamed Bin Hammam.

Al-Faisaly won the AFC Cup for the first time, beating Nejmeh 4–2 on aggregate in the final.

Al-Jaish were the defending champions but were unable to defend their title as Syria was promoted to a 'mature' status by the AFC, meaning its clubs would now compete in the AFC Champions League instead.

== Teams ==
The AFC invited nine of the thirteen 'developing' nations to nominate one or two clubs to participate in the competition. Clubs from Myanmar, North Korea, Oman and Yemen were excluded from the competition.

Mature countries

- China
- Indonesia
- Iran
- Iraq
- Japan
- Kuwait
- Qatar
- Saudi Arabia
- South Korea
- Syria
- Thailand
- United Arab Emirates
- Uzbekistan
- Vietnam

Developing countries

- Bangladesh
- Hong Kong
- India
- Jordan
- Lebanon
- Malaysia
- Maldives
- Myanmar
- North Korea
- Oman
- Singapore
- Turkmenistan
- Yemen

Emerging countries

- Afghanistan
- Bhutan
- Brunei
- Cambodia
- Timor-Leste
- Guam
- Kyrgyzstan
- Laos
- Macau
- Mongolia
- Nepal
- Pakistan
- Palestine
- Philippines
- Sri Lanka
- Taiwan
- Tajikistan

| West Asia | | | East Asia | | |
| Team | Qualifying method | App (Last) | Team | Qualifying method | App (Last) |
|---|---|---|---|---|---|
| (Jordan) Al-Faisaly | 2003–04 Jordan League champions | 1st | (Bangladesh) Brothers Union | 2004 Bangladesh National Football League champions | 1st |
| (Jordan) Al-Hussein | 2003–04 Jordan League runners-up | 1st | (Bangladesh) Muktijoddha Sangsad | 2004 Bangladesh National Football League runners-up | 2nd (2004) |
| (Lebanon) Al-Nejmeh | 2003–04 Lebanese Premier League champions | 2nd (2004) | (Hong Kong) Sun Hei | 2003–04 Hong Kong First Division League champions | 1st |
| (Lebanon) Al Ahed | 2004 Lebanese FA Cup winners | 1st | (Hong Kong) Happy Valley | 2004 Hong Kong FA Cup winners | 2nd (2004) |
| (Turkmenistan) Nebitçi | 2004 Ýokary Liga champions | 2nd (2004) | (India) East Bengal | 2003–04 Indian National Football League champions | 2nd (2004) |
| (Turkmenistan) Nisa Aşgabat | 2004 Ýokary Liga runners-up | 2nd (2004) | (India) Dempo | 2004 Indian Federation Cup winners | 1st |
| | | | (Malaysia) Pahang | 2004 Super League Malaysia champions | 1st |
| | | | (Malaysia) Perak | 2004 Malaysian FA Cup winners | 2nd (2004) |
| | | | (Maldives) Club Valencia | 2004 Dhivehi League champions | 2nd (2004) |
| | | | (Maldives) New Radiant | 2004 Dhivehi League runners-up | 1st |
| | | | (Singapore) Tampines Rovers | 2004 S.League champions | 1st |
| | | | (Singapore) Home United | 2004 S.League runners-up | 2nd (2004) |

Notes

1. Jordan (JOR): As the 2003–04 Jordan FA Cup winners Al-Faisaly qualified for the AFC Cup via their league position, the spot reserved for the Jordan FA Cup winners was transferred to the second placed team in the 2003–04 Jordan League.
2. Maldives (MDV): As the 2004 Maldives FA Cup winners Club Valencia qualified for the AFC Cup via their league position, the spot reserved for the Maldives FA Cup winners was transferred to the second placed team in the 2004 Dhivehi League.
3. Singapore (SGP): As the 2004 Singapore Cup winners Tampines Rovers qualified for the AFC Cup via their league position, the spot reserved for the Singapore Cup winners was transferred to the second placed team in the 2004 S.League.
4. Turkmenistan (TKM): As the 2004 Turkmenistan Cup winners Nebitçi qualified for the AFC Cup via their league position, the spot reserved for the Turkmenistan Cup winners was transferred to the second placed team in the 2004 Ýokary Liga.

== Group stage ==
=== Group A ===
| Pos | Team | Pld | W | D | L | GF | GA | GD | Pts | Qualification |
|---|---|---|---|---|---|---|---|---|---|---|
| 1 | (Jordan) Al-Faisaly | 6 | 4 | 2 | 0 | 15 | 5 | +10 | 14 | Advance to Knockout stage |
| 2 | (Turkmenistan) Nebitçi | 6 | 2 | 2 | 2 | 11 | 11 | 0 | 8 | |
| 3 | (India) East Bengal | 6 | 2 | 1 | 3 | 6 | 11 | −5 | 7 | |
| 4 | (Bangladesh) Muktijoddha Sangsad | 6 | 1 | 1 | 4 | 3 | 8 | −5 | 4 | |

Source: RSSSF
9 March 2005

| Al-Faisaly (Jordan) | 1–1 | (Turkmenistan) Nebitçi |
|---|---|---|
| Salim 6' | | Arazov 56' |

Amman International Stadium, Amman
9 March 2005

| East Bengal (India) | 0–0 | (Bangladesh) Muktijoddha Sangsad |

Salt Lake Stadium, Calcutta

16 March 2005

| Nebitçi (Turkmenistan) | 3–2 | (India) East Bengal |
|---|---|---|
| Alikperov 1'; Meredov 60'; Arazov 83' | | Secco 52'; Bhutia 90+2' |

Balkanabat Stadium, Balkanabat
16 March 2005

| Muktijoddha Sangsad (Bangladesh) | 0–3 | (Jordan) Al-Faisaly |
|---|---|---|
| | | Salim 35'; Al-Maharmeh 62' (?) |

Bangabandhu Stadium, Dhaka
Referee: Jimmy Napitupulu Indonesia)

6 April 2005

| Nebitçi (Turkmenistan) | 0–1 | (Bangladesh) Muktijoddha Sangsad |
|---|---|---|
| | | Haque 90+3' |

Balkanabat Stadium, Balkanabat
6 April 2005

| Al-Faisaly (Jordan) | 5–0 | (India) East Bengal |
|---|---|---|
| Salim 13', 43', 73'; Halasa 50', 69' |

Amman International Stadium, Amman

20 April 2005

| East Bengal (India) | 0–1 | (Jordan) Al-Faisaly |
|---|---|---|
| | | Hatem Aqel 31' (pen.) |

Salt Lake Stadium, Calcutta
20 April 2005

| Muktijoddha Sangsad (Bangladesh) | 1–2 | (Turkmenistan) Nebitçi |
|---|---|---|
| Annamyradov 72' (o.g.) | | Alikperov 4', 39' (pen.) |

Bangabandhu Stadium, Dhaka

11 May 2005

| Nebitçi (Turkmenistan) | 3–3 | (Jordan) Al-Faisaly |

Balkanabat Stadium, Balkanabat
11 May 2005

| Muktijoddha Sangsad (Bangladesh) | 0–1 | (India) East Bengal |
|---|---|---|
| | | Singh 75' |

Bangabandhu Stadium, Dhaka

25 May 2005

| East Bengal (India) | 3–2 | (Turkmenistan) Nebitçi |
|---|---|---|
| Jeremiah 28', 57', 63' | | Bazarov 53'; Arazov 88' |

Salt Lake Stadium, Calcutta
25 May 2005

| Al-Faisaly (Jordan) | 2–1 | (Bangladesh) Muktijoddha Sangsad |
|---|---|---|
| Salim 12', 24' | | Hery 48' |

Amman International Stadium, Amman

=== Group B ===
| Pos | Team | Pld | W | D | L | GF | GA | GD | Pts | Qualification |
|---|---|---|---|---|---|---|---|---|---|---|
| 1 | (Jordan) Al-Hussein | 4 | 3 | 0 | 1 | 11 | 4 | +7 | 9 | Advance to Knockout stage |
| 2 | (Lebanon) Al Ahed | 4 | 3 | 0 | 1 | 6 | 6 | 0 | 9 | Advance to Knockout stage |
| 3 | (India) Dempo | 4 | 0 | 0 | 4 | 0 | 7 | −7 | 0 | |

9 March 2005

| Al Ahed (Lebanon) | 1–0 | (India) Dempo |
|---|---|---|
| Shahgeldyan 55' |

Beirut Municipal Stadium, Beirut

16 March 2005

| Al-Hussein (Jordan) | 4–0 | (Lebanon) Al Ahed |
|---|---|---|
| Al-Riahneh 28', 38'; Al-Sheyab 52'; Athamneh 83' |

Al-Hassan Stadium, Irbid

6 April 2005

| Dempo (India) | 0–3 | (Jordan) Al-Hussein |
|---|---|---|
| | | Al-Zboun 32'; Hatamleh 75'; Ehmoud 90+1' |

Nehru Stadium, Margao

20 April 2005

| Al-Hussein (Jordan) | 2–0 | (India) Dempo |
|---|---|---|
| Al-Riahneh 52'; Al-Zboun 80' |

Al-Hassan Stadium, Irbid

11 May 2005

| Dempo (India) | 0–1 | (Lebanon) Al Ahed |
|---|---|---|
| | | Maatouk 72' |

Nehru Stadium, Margao

25 May 2005

| Al Ahed (Lebanon) | 4–2 | (Jordan) Al-Hussein |
|---|---|---|
| Maatouk 28', 30'; Ayoub 54', 76' | | Al-Zboun 23'; Al-Sheyab 83' |

Beirut Municipal Stadium, Beirut

=== Group C ===
| Pos | Team | Pld | W | D | L | GF | GA | GD | Pts | Qualification |
|---|---|---|---|---|---|---|---|---|---|---|
| 1 | (Lebanon) Nejmeh | 4 | 4 | 0 | 0 | 8 | 1 | +7 | 12 | Advance to Knockout stage |
| 2 | (Turkmenistan) Nisa Aşgabat | 4 | 0 | 2 | 2 | 1 | 3 | −2 | 2 | |
| 3 | (Bangladesh) Brothers Union | 4 | 0 | 2 | 2 | 2 | 7 | −5 | 2 | |

9 March 2005

| Brothers Union (Bangladesh) | 1–1 | (Turkmenistan) Nisa Aşgabat |
|---|---|---|
| Khokon 86' | | Urazov 17' |

Bangabandhu Stadium, Dhaka

16 March 2005

| Nejmeh (Lebanon) | 4–1 | (Bangladesh) Brothers Union |
|---|---|---|
| Hojeij 1'; Qassas 3', 13'; Atwi 86' | | Rana 24' |

Al Manara Stadium, Beirut

6 April 2005

| Nisa Aşgabat (Turkmenistan) | 0–1 | (Lebanon) Nejmeh |
|---|---|---|
| | | Qassas 86' |

Nisa Stadium, Asgabat

20 April 2005

| Nejmeh (Lebanon) | 1–0 | (Turkmenistan) Nisa Aşgabat |
|---|---|---|
| Atwi 76' |

Al Manara Stadium, Beirut

11 May 2005

| Nisa Aşgabat (Turkmenistan) | 0–0 | (Bangladesh) Brothers Union |

Nisa Stadium, Asgabat

25 May 2005

| Brothers Union (Bangladesh) | 0–2 | (Lebanon) Nejmeh |
|---|---|---|
| | | Ghaddar 44', 82' |

Bangabandhu Stadium, Dhaka

=== Group D ===
| Pos | Team | Pld | W | D | L | GF | GA | GD | Pts | Qualification |
|---|---|---|---|---|---|---|---|---|---|---|
| 1 | (Hong Kong) Sun Hei | 6 | 3 | 3 | 0 | 12 | 5 | +7 | 12 | Advance to Knockout stage |
| 2 | (Singapore) Tampines Rovers | 6 | 3 | 2 | 1 | 12 | 6 | +6 | 11 | Advance to Knockout stage |
| 3 | (Maldives) Club Valencia | 6 | 1 | 2 | 3 | 5 | 14 | −9 | 5 | |
| 4 | (Malaysia) Perak | 6 | 1 | 1 | 4 | 7 | 11 | −4 | 4 | |

9 March 2005

| Sun Hei (Hong Kong) | 6–1 | (Maldives) Club Valencia |
|---|---|---|
| Hartwig 59'; Akosah 59', 73'; Poon Man Tik 90+1'; Chu Siu Kei 90+3' | | Kvasz 80' |

Mong Kok Stadium, Hong Kong
9 March 2005

| Perak (Malaysia) | 2–1 | (Singapore) Tampines Rovers |
|---|---|---|
| Mandjou 38'; Saad 72' | | Hucika 22' |

Perak Stadium, Ipoh

16 March 2005

| Club Valencia (Maldives) | 1–1 | (Malaysia) Perak |
|---|---|---|
| Ashfaq 39' | | Ismail 41' |

Rasmee Dhandu Stadium, Malé
16 March 2005

| Tampines Rovers (Singapore) | 1–1 | (Hong Kong) Sun Hei |
|---|---|---|
| Shafaein 50' | | Hartwig 19' |

Tampines Stadium, Singapore

6 April 2005

| Tampines Rovers (Singapore) | 1–0 | (Maldives) Club Valencia |
|---|---|---|
| Grabovac 12' |

Tampines Stadium, Singapore
6 April 2005

| Perak (Malaysia) | 0–1 | (Hong Kong) Sun Hei |
|---|---|---|
| | | Akosah 71' |

Perak Stadium, Ipoh

20 April 2005

| Club Valencia (Maldives) | 0–4 | (Singapore) Tampines Rovers |
|---|---|---|
| | | Luthfy 48' (o.g.); Grabovac 61'; Shah 68'; Shafaein 77' |

Rasmee Dhandu Stadium, Malé
20 April 2005

| Sun Hei (Hong Kong) | 2–1 | (Malaysia) Perak |
|---|---|---|
| Akosah 31', 87' | | Hoong 37' |

Mong Kok Stadium, Hong Kong

11 May 2005

| Club Valencia (Maldives) | 1–1 | (Hong Kong) Sun Hei |
|---|---|---|
| Kvasz 61' | | Chu Siu Kei 90+5' |

Rasmee Dhandu Stadium, Malé
11 May 2005

| Tampines Rovers (Singapore) | 4–2 | (Malaysia) Perak |
|---|---|---|
| Shah 5', 82'; Grabovac 32'; Hucika 41' | | Traoré 29'; Mandjou 56' |

Tampines Stadium, Singapore

25 May 2005

| Sun Hei (Hong Kong) | 1–1 | (Singapore) Tampines Rovers |

Mong Kok Stadium, Hong Kong
25 May 2005

| Perak (Malaysia) | 1–2 | (Maldives) Club Valencia |
|---|---|---|
| Saad 37' (pen.) | | Naseer 45+1'; Umar 84' |

Perak Stadium, Ipoh

=== Group E ===
| Pos | Team | Pld | W | D | L | GF | GA | GD | Pts | Qualification |
|---|---|---|---|---|---|---|---|---|---|---|
| 1 | (Singapore) Home United | 6 | 4 | 1 | 1 | 13 | 5 | +8 | 13 | Advance to Knockout stage |
| 2 | (Maldives) New Radiant | 6 | 3 | 1 | 2 | 6 | 4 | +2 | 10 | Advance to Knockout stage |
| 3 | (Malaysia) Pahang | 6 | 2 | 3 | 1 | 10 | 8 | +2 | 9 | |
| 4 | (Hong Kong) Happy Valley | 6 | 0 | 1 | 5 | 2 | 14 | −12 | 1 | |

9 March 2005

| New Radiant (Maldives) | 2–0 | (Hong Kong) Happy Valley |
|---|---|---|
| Kamenov 44'; Fazeel 83' |

Rasmee Dhandu Stadium, Malé
9 March 2005

| Home United (Singapore) | 2–1 | (Malaysia) Pahang |
|---|---|---|
| Oliveira 23'; Abdullah 77' | | Tchoutang 3' (pen.) |

Bishan Stadium, Singapore

16 March 2005

| Happy Valley (Hong Kong) | 0–1 | (Singapore) Home United |
|---|---|---|
| | | Oliveira 74' |

Mong Kok Stadium, Hong Kong
16 March 2005

| Pahang (Malaysia) | 1–0 | (Maldives) New Radiant |
|---|---|---|
| Omar 89' |

Darulmakmur Stadium, Kuantan

6 April 2005

| New Radiant (Maldives) | 1–0 | (Singapore) Home United |
|---|---|---|
| Kasirye 40' |

Rasmee Dhandu Stadium, Malé
6 April 2005

| Happy Valley (Hong Kong) | 1–1 | (Malaysia) Pahang |
|---|---|---|
| Yue-hung 45' | | Mahayuddin 62' |

Mong Kok Stadium, Hong Kong

20 April 2005

| Home United (Singapore) | 2–0 | (Maldives) New Radiant |
|---|---|---|
| Goncalves 8'; Oliviera 64' |

Bishan Stadium, Singapore
20 April 2005

| Pahang (Malaysia) | 3–1 | (Hong Kong) Happy Valley |
|---|---|---|
| Yusuf 25'; Tchoutang 30'; Mahayuddin 53' | | Alcântara 21' |

Darulmakmur Stadium, Kuantan

11 May 2005

| Happy Valley (Hong Kong) | 0–2 | (Maldives) New Radiant |

Mong Kok Stadium, Hong Kong
11 May 2005

| Pahang (Malaysia) | 3–3 | (Singapore) Home United |
|---|---|---|
| Talib 18'; Mahayuddin 30'; Tchoutang 90+1' | | Iskandar 23'; Goncalves 28'; Oliveira 53' |

Darulmakmur Stadium, Kuantan

25 May 2005

| New Radiant (Maldives) | 1–1 | (Malaysia) Pahang |
|---|---|---|
| Mohamed 85' | | Mahayuddin 78' |

Rasmee Dhandu Stadium, Malé
25 May 2005

| Home United (Singapore) | 5–0 | (Hong Kong) Happy Valley |
|---|---|---|
| Daud 21'; Juraimi 30', 70', 78'; Siva Kumar 49' |

Bishan Stadium, Singapore

=== Ranking of runners-up ===
| Pos | Team | Pld | W | D | L | GF | GA | GD | Pts | Qualification |
|---|---|---|---|---|---|---|---|---|---|---|
| 1 | (Singapore) Tampines Rovers | 6 | 3 | 2 | 1 | 12 | 6 | +6 | 11 | Advance to Knockout stage |
| 2 | (Maldives) New Radiant | 6 | 3 | 1 | 2 | 6 | 4 | +2 | 10 | Advance to Knockout stage |
| 3 | (Lebanon) Al Ahed | 4 | 3 | 0 | 1 | 6 | 6 | 0 | 9 | Advance to Knockout stage |
| 4 | (Turkmenistan) Nebitçi | 6 | 2 | 2 | 2 | 11 | 11 | 0 | 8 | |
| 5 | (Turkmenistan) Nisa Aşgabat | 4 | 0 | 2 | 2 | 1 | 3 | −2 | 2 | |

== Knockout stage ==
=== Bracket ===
Quarter-finals
(Maldives) New Radiant | 1 | 0 | 1
(Jordan) Al-Hussein | 0 | 0 | 0
(Jordan) Al-Faisaly | 1 | 1 | 2
(Singapore) Tampines Rovers | 0 | 0 | 0
(Singapore) Home United | 0 | 2 | 2
(Lebanon) Nejmeh | 3 | 3 | 6
(Lebanon) Al-Ahed | 1 | 1 | 2
(Hong Kong) Sun Hei | 0 | 3 | 3

Semi-finals
(Maldives) New Radiant | 1 | 1 | 2
(Jordan) Al-Faisaly | 1 | 4 | 5
(Lebanon) Nejmeh | 3 | 3 | 6
(Hong Kong) Sun Hei | 0 | 2 | 2

Final
(Jordan) Al-Faisaly | 1 | 3 | 4
(Lebanon) Nejmeh | 0 | 2 | 2

=== Quarter-finals ===
==== Summary ====
The first legs were played on 14 September, and the second legs were played on 21 September 2005.

| Team 1 | Agg. | Team 2 | 1st leg | 2nd leg |
|---|---|---|---|---|
| New Radiant (Maldives) | 1–0 | (Jordan) Al-Hussein | 1–0 | 0–0 |
| Al-Faisaly (Jordan) | 2–0 | (Singapore) Tampines Rovers | 1–0 | 1–0 |
| Home United (Singapore) | 2–6 | (Lebanon) Nejmeh | 0–3 | 2–3 |
| Al-Ahed (Lebanon) | 2–3 | (Hong Kong) Sun Hei | 1–0 | 1–3 |

==== Matches ====
14 September 2005

| New Radiant (Maldives) | 1–0 | (Jordan) Al-Hussein |
|---|---|---|
| Thoriq 85' |

Rasmee Dhandu Stadium, Malé
21 September 2005

| Al-Hussein (Jordan) | 0–0 | (Maldives) New Radiant |

Al Hassan Stadium, Irbid

New Radiant won 1–0 on aggregate.

14 September 2005

| Al-Faisaly (Jordan) | 1–0 | (Singapore) Tampines Rovers |
|---|---|---|
| Al-Maharmeh 64' |

Amman International Stadium, Amman
21 September 2005

| Tampines Rovers (Singapore) | 0–1 | (Jordan) Al-Faisaly |
|---|---|---|
| | | Al-Tall 31' |

Tampines Stadium, Singapore

Al-Faisaly won 2–0 on aggregate.

14 September 2005

| Home United (Singapore) | 0–3 | (Lebanon) Nejmeh |
|---|---|---|
| | | Mohamad 24'; Hojeij 53'; Atwi 73' |

Bishan Stadium, Singapore
21 September 2005

| Nejmeh (Lebanon) | 3–2 | (Singapore) Home United |
|---|---|---|
| Nasseredine 35'; Ghaddar 59'; Mohamad 72' | | Daud 18'; Haja 49' |

King Abdullah Stadium, Amman

Al-Nejmeh won 6–2 on aggregate.

14 September 2005

| Al Ahed (Lebanon) | 1–0 | (Hong Kong) Sun Hei |
|---|---|---|
| Ossama Haidar 39' |

Beirut Municipal Stadium, Beirut
21 September 2005

| Sun Hei (Hong Kong) | 3–1 | (Lebanon) Al-Ahed |
|---|---|---|
| Akosah 42'; Lee Kin Wo 52'; Keung 90' (pen.) | | Atiq 45+2' |

Hong Kong Stadium, Hong Kong

Sun Hei won 3–2 on aggregate.

=== Semi-finals ===
==== Summary ====
The first legs were played on 28 September, and the second legs were played on 12 October 2005.

| Team 1 | Agg. | Team 2 | 1st leg | 2nd leg |
|---|---|---|---|---|
| New Radiant (Maldives) | 2–5 | (Jordan) Al-Faisaly | 1–1 | 1–4 |
| Nejmeh (Lebanon) | 6–2 | (Hong Kong) Sun Hei | 3–0 | 3–2 |

==== Matches ====
28 September 2005

| New Radiant (Maldives) | 1–1 | (Jordan) Al-Faisaly |
|---|---|---|
| Adam 51' | | Al-Shboul 20' |

Rasmee Dhandu Stadium, Malé
12 October 2005

| Al-Faisaly (Jordan) | 4–1 | (Maldives) New Radiant |
|---|---|---|
| Salim 8', 42'; Al-Tall 57'; Al-Shboul 89' | | Thoriq 90+1' |

Amman International Stadium, Amman

Al-Faisaly won 5–2 on aggregate.

28 September 2005

| Nejmeh (Lebanon) | 3–0 | (Hong Kong) Sun Hei |
|---|---|---|
| Ghaddar 24', 58'; Nasseredine 69' |

Al Manara Stadium, Beirut
12 October 2005

| Sun Hei (Hong Kong) | 2–3 | (Lebanon) Nejmeh |
|---|---|---|
| Cheuk 9'; Akosah 25' | | Nasseredine 26'; Hamieh 45'; Ghaddar 87' |

Hong Kong Stadium, Hong Kong
Attendance: 2,649

Al-Nejmeh won 6–2 on aggregate.

=== Final ===
==== Summary ====
The first leg was played on 19 October, and the second leg was played on 26 October 2005.

| Team 1 | Agg. | Team 2 | 1st leg | 2nd leg |
|---|---|---|---|---|
| Al-Faisaly (Jordan) | 4–2 | (Lebanon) Nejmeh | 1–0 | 3–2 |

==== Matches ====
19 October 2005

| Al-Faisaly (Jordan) | 1–0 | (Lebanon) Nejmeh |
|---|---|---|
| Saad 35' |

Amman International Stadium, Amman
26 October 2005

| Nejmeh (Lebanon) | 2–3 | (Jordan) Al-Faisaly |
|---|---|---|
| Hojeij 35' (pen.), 72' | | Saad 19', 59'; Al-Sheikh 88' |

Al Manara Stadium, Beirut

Al-Faisaly won 4–2 on aggregate.

2005 AFC Cup Winners
Al-Faisaly
First title

== See also ==
- 2005 AFC Champions League
