= Syrian football clubs in Asian competitions =

The Syrian club's history of playing in the AFC Cup.

== Participations ==
Participations
Team	Qualified	2004	2005	2006	2007	2008	2009	2010	2011	2012
(Syria) Al-Ittihad	3 Times	—	—	—	—	—	—	Winner	Group Stage	Qualified
(Syria) Al-Jaish	3 Times	Winner	—	—	—	—	—	Group Stage	Group Stage	—
(Syria) Al-Karamah	3 Times	—	—	—	—	—	Runner-up	Quarter-finals	Group Stage	—
(Syria) Al-Majd	1 Time	—	—	—	—	—	Round of 16	—	—	—
(Syria) Al-Shorta	1 Time	—	—	—	—	—	—	—	—	Qualified
(Syria) Al-Wahda	1 Time	Runner-up	—	—	—	—	—	—	—	—

== Syrian clubs statistics ==
=== Al-Ittihad ===
Al-Ittihad Statistics
Team	Pld	W	D	L	GF	GA	GD
(Syria) Al-Ittihad	21	9	6	6	27	22	+5

Pld = Matches played; W = Matches won; D = Matches drawn; L = Matches lost; GF = Goals for; GA = Goals against; GD = Goal difference.

Al-Ittihad Results
Season	Date	Round	Opponent	Results	Venue
2010	10 March 2010	Group	(India) Kingfisher East Bengal	4 – 1	Salt Lake Stadium, Kolkata, India
2010	17 March 2010	Group	(Kuwait) Al-Qadsia	0 – 0	Aleppo International Stadium, Aleppo, Syria
2010	24 March 2010	Group	(Lebanon) Al-Nejmeh	4 – 2	Aleppo International Stadium, Aleppo, Syria
2010	6 April 2010	Group	(Lebanon) Al-Nejmeh	0 – 1	Camille Chamoun Stadium, Beirut, Lebanon
2010	20 April 2010	Group	(India) Kingfisher East Bengal	2 – 1	Aleppo International Stadium, Aleppo, Syria
2010	27 April 2010	Group	(Kuwait) Al-Qadsia	0 – 3	Mohammed Al-Hamad Stadium, Hawalli, Kuwait
2010	12 May 2010	Round of 16	Al-Kuwait	1 – 1 (aet) (5–4 p)	Al Kuwait Sports Club Stadium, Kuwait City, Kuwait
2010	15 September 2010	QF	(Kuwait) Kazma	3 – 2	Aleppo International Stadium, Aleppo, Syria
2010	22 September 2010	QF	(Kuwait) Kazma	1 – 0	Al-Sadaqua Walsalam Stadium, Kuwait City, Kuwait
2010	5 October 2010	SF	(Thailand) Muangthong United	0 – 1	Yamaha Stadium, Nonthaburi, Thailand
2010	19 October 2010	SF	(Thailand) Muangthong United	2 – 0	Aleppo International Stadium, Aleppo, Syria
2010	6 November 2010	Final	(Kuwait) Al-Qadsia	1 – 1 (aet) (4–2 p)	Jaber Al-Ahmad International Stadium, Kuwait City, Kuwait
2011	1 March 2011	Group	(Yemen) Al-Saqr	2 – 1	Ali Muhesen Stadium, Sana'a, Yemen
2011	15 March 2011	Group	(Kuwait) Al-Qadsia	0 – 2	Aleppo International Stadium, Aleppo, Syria
2011	13 April 2011	Group	(Uzbekistan) Shurtan Guzar	1 – 1	G'uzor Stadium, G‘uzor, Uzbekistan
2011	26 April 2011	Group	(Uzbekistan) Shurtan Guzar	0 – 0	Aleppo International Stadium, Aleppo, Syria
2011	4 May 2011	Group	(Yemen) Al-Saqr	2 – 0	Aleppo International Stadium, Aleppo, Syria
2011	11 May 2011	Group	(Kuwait) Al-Qadsia	2 – 3	Mohammed Al-Hamad Stadium, Hawalli, Kuwait
2012	6 March 2012	Group	(Jordan) Al-Faisaly	1 – 1	Amman International Stadium, Amman, Jordan
2012	20 March 2012	Group	(Kuwait) Al-Qadsia	1 – 0	Mohammed Al-Hamad Stadium, Hawalli, Kuwait^{1}
2012	3 April 2012	Group	(Oman) Al-Suwaiq	0 – 2	Seeb Stadium, Seeb, Oman
2012	11 April 2012	Group	(Oman) Al-Suwaiq	–	TBC^{1}
2012	25 April 2012	Group	(Jordan) Al-Faisaly	–	TBC^{1}
2012	9 May 2012	Group	(Kuwait) Al-Qadsia	–	Mohammed Al-Hamad Stadium, Hawalli, Kuwait

* Al-Ittihad score always listed first

Win Draw Loss

- Note 1: Due to the political crisis in Syria, the AFC requested Syrian clubs to play their home matches at neutral venues.

=== Al-Jaish ===
Al-Jaish Statistics
Team	Pld	W	D	L	GF	GA	GD
(Syria) Al-Jaish	22	11	7	4	38	16	+22

Pld = Matches played; W = Matches won; D = Matches drawn; L = Matches lost; GF = Goals for; GA = Goals against; GD = Goal difference.

Al-Jaish Results
Season	Date	Round	Opponent	Results	Venue
2004	10 February 2004	Group	(Lebanon) Olimpic Beirut	0 – 0	Tripoli Municipal Stadium, Tripoli, Lebanon
2004	25 February 2004	Group	(Turkmenistan) Nebitci Balkanabat	6 – 0	Al-Jalaa Stadium, Damascus, Syria
2004	5 May 2004	Group	(Lebanon) Olimpic Beirut	2 – 0	Abbasiyyin Stadium, Damascus, Syria
2004	19 May 2004	Group	(Turkmenistan) Nebitci Balkanabat	0 – 0	Balkanabat Stadium, Balkanabat, Turkmenistan
2004	15 September 2004	QF	(India) Kingfisher East Bengal	0 – 0	East Bengal Ground, Kolkata, India
2004	22 September 2004	QF	(India) Kingfisher East Bengal	3 – 0	Abbasiyyin Stadium, Damascus, Syria
2004	20 October 2004	SF	(Singapore) Home United	4 – 0	Abbasiyyin Stadium, Damascus, Syria
2004	27 October 2004	SF	(Singapore) Home United	2 – 1	Bishan Stadium, Bishan, Singapore
2004	19 November 2004	Final	(Syria) Al-Wahda	3 – 2	Abbasiyyin Stadium, Damascus, Syria
2004	26 November 2004	Final	(Syria) Al-Wahda	0 – 1	Abbasiyyin Stadium, Damascus, Syria
2010	24 February 2010	Group	(Kuwait) Kazma	0 – 1	Abbasiyyin Stadium, Damascus, Syria
2010	17 March 2010	Group	(Uzbekistan) Nasaf Qarshi	1 – 2	Markaziy Stadium, Bukhara, Uzbekistan
2010	23 March 2010	Group	(Lebanon) Al-Ahed	1 – 1	Camille Chamoun Stadium, Beirut, Lebanon
2010	7 April 2010	Group	(Lebanon) Al-Ahed	6 – 3	Abbasiyyin Stadium, Damascus, Syria
2010	20 April 2010	Group	(Kuwait) Kazma	1 – 0	Al-Sadaqua Walsalam Stadium, Kuwait City, Kuwait
2010	27 April 2010	Group	(Uzbekistan) Nasaf Qarshi	1 – 1	Abbasiyyin Stadium, Damascus, Syria
2011	2 March 2011	Group	(Jordan) Al-Faisaly	0 – 2	King Abdullah Stadium, Amman, Jordan
2011	16 March 2011	Group	(Kuwait) Al-Naser	2 – 1	Abbasiyyin Stadium, Damascus, Syria
2011	12 April 2011	Group	(Iraq) Duhok	0 – 0	Abbasiyyin Stadium, Damascus, Syria
2011	27 April 2011	Group	(Iraq) Duhok	1 – 0	Duhok Stadium, Duhok, Iraq
2011	3 May 2011	Group	(Jordan) Al-Faisaly	1 – 1	Abbasiyyin Stadium, Damascus, Syria
2011	10 May 2011	Group	(Kuwait) Al-Naser	4 – 0	Sabah Al Salem Stadium, Kuwait City, Kuwait

* Al-Jaish score always listed first

Win Draw Loss

=== Al-Karamah ===
Al-Karamah Statistics
Team	Pld	W	D	L	GF	GA	GD
(Syria) Al-Karamah	27	13	7	7	41	31	+10

Pld = Matches played; W = Matches won; D = Matches drawn; L = Matches lost; GF = Goals for; GA = Goals against; GD = Goal difference.

Al-Karamah Results
Season	Date	Round	Opponent	Results	Venue
2009	10 March 2009	Group	(India) Mohun Bagan	1 – 0	Khaled Ibn Al Walid Stadium, Homs, Syria
2009	17 March 2009	Group	Al-Kuwait	1 – 2	Al Kuwait Sports Club Stadium, Kuwait City, Kuwait
2009	7 April 2009	Group	(Jordan) Al-Wehdat	3 – 1	Khaled Ibn Al Walid Stadium, Homs, Syria
2009	21 April 2009	Group	(Jordan) Al-Wehdat	1 – 3	King Abdullah Stadium, Amman, Jordan
2009	5 May 2009	Group	Al-Kuwait	2 – 1	Khaled Ibn Al Walid Stadium, Homs, Syria
2009	19 May 2009	Group	(India) Mohun Bagan	4 – 0	Howrah Municipal Corporation Stadium, Howrah, India
2009	26 May 2009	Round of 16	(Bahrain) Busaiteen	2 – 1 (aet)	Bahrain National Stadium, Manama, Bahrain
2009	15 September 2009	QF	(Kuwait) Al-Arabi	0 – 0	Khaled Ibn Al Walid Stadium, Homs, Syria
2009	30 September 2009	QF	(Kuwait) Al-Arabi	0 – 0 (aet) (5–4 p)	Sabah Al Salem Stadium, Kuwait City, Kuwait
2009	15 October 2009	SF	(Vietnam) Bình Dương	1 – 2	Gò Đậu Stadium, Thủ Dầu Một, Vietnam
2009	21 October 2009	SF	(Vietnam) Bình Dương	3 – 0	Khaled Ibn Al Walid Stadium, Homs, Syria
2009	3 November 2009	Final	Al-Kuwait	1 – 2	Al Kuwait Sports Club Stadium, Kuwait City, Kuwait
2010	23 February 2010	Group	(Oman) Saham	2 – 0	Khaled Ibn Al Walid Stadium, Homs, Syria
2010	16 March 2010	Group	(Jordan) Shabab Al-Ordon	2 – 2	King Abdullah Stadium, Amman, Jordan
2010	23 March 2010	Group	(Yemen) Al-Ahli	2 – 0	Khaled Ibn Al Walid Stadium, Homs, Syria
2010	7 April 2010	Group	(Yemen) Al-Ahli	1 – 0	Ali Muhesen Stadium, Sana'a, Yemen
2010	21 April 2010	Group	(Oman) Saham	4 – 1	Seeb Stadium, Seeb, Oman
2010	28 April 2010	Group	(Jordan) Shabab Al-Ordon	1 – 1	Khaled Ibn Al Walid Stadium, Homs, Syria
2010	11 May 2010	Round of 16	(Uzbekistan) Nasaf Qarshi	1 – 0	Khaled Ibn Al Walid Stadium, Homs, Syria
2010	14 September 2010	QF	(Thailand) Muangthong United	1 – 0	Khaled Ibn Al Walid Stadium, Homs, Syria
2010	21 September 2010	QF	(Thailand) Muangthong United	0 – 2	Yamaha Stadium, Nonthaburi, Thailand
2011	1 March 2011	Group	(Oman) Al-Oruba	2 – 2	Khaled Ibn Al Walid Stadium, Homs, Syria
2011	15 March 2011	Group	(Iraq) Arbil	1 – 1	Franso Hariri Stadium, Arbil, Iraq
2011	12 April 2011	Group	(Lebanon) Al-Ahed	1 – 4	Camille Chamoun Stadium, Beirut, Lebanon
2011	27 April 2011	Group	(Lebanon) Al-Ahed	3 – 2	Abbasiyyin Stadium, Damascus, Syria
2011	4 May 2011	Group	(Oman) Al-Oruba	1 – 1	Seeb Stadium, Seeb, Oman
2011	11 May 2011	Group	(Iraq) Arbil	0 – 3	Abbasiyyin Stadium, Damascus, Syria

* Al-Karamah score always listed first

Win Draw Loss

=== Al-Majd ===
Al-Majd Statistics
Team	Pld	W	D	L	GF	GA	GD
(Syria) Al-Majd	7	4	2	1	12	9	+3

Pld = Matches played; W = Matches won; D = Matches drawn; L = Matches lost; GF = Goals for; GA = Goals against; GD = Goal difference.

Al-Majd Results
Season	Date	Round	Opponent	Results	Venue
2009	10 March 2009	Group	(India) Dempo	0 – 1	Pandit Jawaharlal Nehru Stadium, Goa, India
2009	17 March 2009	Group	(Bahrain) Al-Muharraq	1 – 1	Abbasiyyin Stadium, Damascus, Syria
2009	7 April 2009	Group	(Jordan) Al-Faisaly	2 – 1	Amman International Stadium, Amman, Jordan
2009	21 April 2009	Group	(Jordan) Al-Faisaly	4 – 3	Abbasiyyin Stadium, Damascus, Syria
2009	5 May 2009	Group	(India) Dempo	2 – 1	Abbasiyyin Stadium, Damascus, Syria
2009	19 May 2009	Group	(Bahrain) Al-Muharraq	3 – 2	Bahrain National Stadium, Manama, Bahrain
2009	26 May 2009	Round of 16	(Uzbekistan) Neftchi Fargona	0 – 0 (aet) (1–3 p)	Abbasiyyin Stadium, Damascus, Syria

* Al-Majd score always listed first

Win Draw Loss

=== Al-Shorta ===
Al-Shorta Statistics
Team	Pld	W	D	L	GF	GA	GD
(Syria) Al-Shorta	3	3	0	0	8	2	+6

Pld = Matches played; W = Matches won; D = Matches drawn; L = Matches lost; GF = Goals for; GA = Goals against; GD = Goal difference.

Al-Shorta Results
Season	Date	Round	Opponent	Results	Venue
2012	7 March 2012	Group	(Iraq) Al-Zawra'a	3 – 2	Petra Stadium, Amman, Jordan^{1}
2012	20 March 2012	Group	(Lebanon) Safa	2 – 0	Camille Chamoun Sports City Stadium, Beirut, Lebanon
2012	3 April 2012	Group	(Yemen) Al-Tilal	3 – 0	Prince Mohammed Stadium, Zarqa, Jordan^{1}
2012	11 April 2012	Group	(Yemen) Al-Tilal	–	TBC
2012	25 April 2012	Group	(Iraq) Al-Zawra'a	–	Duhok Stadium, Dohuk, Iraq
2012	9 May 2012	Group	(Lebanon) Safa	–	TBC^{1}

* Al-Shurta score always listed first

Win Draw Loss

- Note 1: Due to the political crisis in Syria, the AFC requested Syrian clubs to play their home matches at neutral venues.

=== Al-Wahda ===
Al-Wahda Statistics
Team	Pld	W	D	L	GF	GA	GD
(Syria) Al-Wahda	10	5	3	2	17	10	+7

Pld = Matches played; W = Matches won; D = Matches drawn; L = Matches lost; GF = Goals for; GA = Goals against; GD = Goal difference.

Al-Wahda Results
Season	Date	Round	Opponent	Results	Venue
2004	25 February 2004	Group	(Oman) Dhofar	1 – 1	Sultan Qaboos Sports Complex, Muscat, Oman
2004	7 April 2004	Group	(India) Mahindra United	0 – 0	Cooperage Ground, Mumbai, India
2004	21 April 2004	Group	(India) Mahindra United	5 – 1	Abbasiyyin Stadium, Damascus, Syria
2004	19 May 2004	Group	(Oman) Dhofar	2 – 0	Abbasiyyin Stadium, Damascus, Syria
2004	14 September 2004	QF	(Lebanon) Al-Nejmeh	2 – 1	Abbasiyyin Stadium, Damascus, Syria
2004	21 September 2004	QF	(Lebanon) Al-Nejmeh	2 – 3	Camille Chamoun Stadium, Beirut, Lebanon
2004	19 October 2004	SF	(Singapore) Geylang United	1 – 1	Abbasiyyin Stadium, Damascus, Syria
2004	26 October 2004	SF	(Singapore) Geylang United	1 – 0	Bedok Stadium, Bedok, Singapore
2004	19 November 2004	Final	(Syria) Al-Jaish	2 – 3	Abbasiyyin Stadium, Damascus, Syria
2004	26 November 2004	Final	(Syria) Al-Jaish	1 – 0	Abbasiyyin Stadium, Damascus, Syria

* Al-Wahda score always listed first

Win Draw Loss

== See also ==
- AFC Cup
