= Boyko Kamenov =

Bulgarian footballer and manager

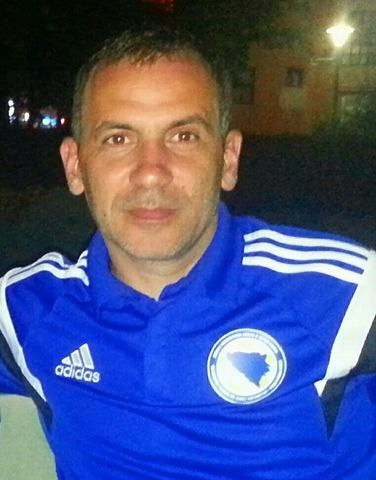

Personal information
- Full name: Boyko Kamenov Simeonov
- Date of birth: 28 November 1975 (age 50)
- Place of birth: Varna, Bulgaria
- Height: 1.81 m (5 ft 11 1/2 in)
- Positions: Attacking midfielder; forward

Team information
- Current team: Simba (assistant)

Senior career*
Years	Team	Apps	(Gls)
1995–2000	Cherno More	108	(26)
2000–2001	Spartak Varna	22	(6)
2001–2002	Marek Dupnitsa	20	(4)
2002–2003	Floriana	18	(1)
2004–2005	New Radiant	56	(33)
2006	Geylang United	26	(2)
2007	VB Sports Club	16	(1)
2008–2009	Chernomorets Byala	12	(19)

Managerial career
- 2009: Aksakovo (youth coach)
- 2010: Aksakovo
- 2010–2011: Spartak Varna
- 2011–2012: Bdin Vidin (assistant)
- 2013: Club Valencia
- 2014: Al Safa (assistant)
- 2015–2016: Botev Plovdiv (assistant)
- 2017–2018: Spartak Varna (assistant)
- 2020–2022: Chernomorets Balchik
- 2025–: Simba (assistant)
- * Club domestic league appearances and goals

Boyko Kamenov Simeonov (Bulgarian: Бойко Каменов Симеонов; born 28 November 1975) is a Bulgarian former professional footballer and a professional football manager who is currently the assistant coach of Tanzanian Premier League club Simba.

== Playing career ==
Kamenov played as a forward and attacking midfielder in a 14-year professional career. He began his career at Cherno More Varna. In his career Kamenov played for several clubs in Bulgaria, Malta, Maldives and Singapore.

With New Radiant he won Maldivies President's Cup and Malé League in 2004 and Maldives FA Cup in 2005. Kamenov was part of the squad that reached the semi-finals of the 2005 AFC Cup, scoring two goals in eight games.

In 2006, Kamenov signed with Singapore's S.League side Geylang United. He ended his career at the end of the 2008–09 season.

== Coaching career ==
In January 2013, Kamenov was announced as the new head coach of Maldivian side Club Valencia.

On 12 November 2015, it was announced that Kamenov had joined Bulgarian top division club Botev Plovdiv as assistant head coach. He left Botev in August 2016, following Nikolay Kostov out of the club.

== Honours ==
=== As a player ===
New Radiant

- Maldivies President's Cup: 2004
- Malé League: 2004
- Maldives FA Cup: 2005
