= Branko Hucika =

Croatian footballer

Personal information
- Full name: Branko Hucika
- Date of birth: 10 July 1977 (age 49)
- Place of birth: Zagreb, SR Croatia, SFR Yugoslavia
- Height: 1.83 m (6 ft 0 in)
- Position: Defender

Senior career*
Years	Team	Apps	(Gls)
1994–1997	Croatia Zagreb	0	(0)
1997–1999	Hrvatski Dragovoljac	44	(0)
1999–2000	Ulsan Hyundai	0	(0)
2000	→ Shonan Bellmare (loan)	18	(1)
2001–2002	Čakovec	23	(0)
2002	Győri ETO	15	(3)
2003–2004	NK Zagreb	18	(0)
2004–2005	Tampines Rovers	25	(6)
2006	Polonia Warsaw	23	(2)
2007	HAŠK		
- * Club domestic league appearances and goals

Branko Hucika (born 10 July 1977) is a Croatian former professional footballer who played as a defender. Currently working as football agent. Owner of HBRsport agency

== Club statistics ==
Club performance			League		Cup		League Cup		Total	
Season	Club	League	Apps	Goals	Apps	Goals	Apps	Goals	Apps	Goals
Japan			League		Emperor's Cup		J.League Cup		Total	
2000	Shonan Bellmare	J2 League	18	1	0	0	0	0	18	1
Total			18	1	0	0	0	0	18	1

== Honours ==
Tampines Rovers

- Singapore Premier League: 2005
