= Nabil Al Shahmeh =

Syrian footballer (born 1974)

Personal information
- Date of birth: 17 March 1974 (age 52)
- Place of birth: Syria
- Position: Striker

Senior career*
Years	Team	Apps	(Gls)
2002–2005	Al-Wahda		
2005–2006	Jableh		
2006–2007	Taliya		
2007–2008	Al-Wahda		
2008	Jableh		
2008–2009	Al-Badiah Al-Wosta		
2009–2010	Al-Shorta		
2010–2011	Al-Badiah Al-Wosta		

International career
- Syria
- * Club domestic league appearances and goals

Nabil Al Shahmeh (Arabic: نبيل الشحمة; born 17 March 1974) is a former Syrian footballer who played for Syria national football team.
