= 2004 AFC Cup =

Inaugural edition of secondary club football tournament organized by the AFC

Tournament details
- Dates: 10 February – 26 November 2004
- Teams: 18 (from 11 associations)

Final positions
- Champions: (Syria) Al-Jaish (1st title)
- Runners-up: (Syria) Al-Wahda

Tournament statistics
- Matches played: 61
- Goals scored: 178 (2.92 per match)
- Top scorer(s): (Singapore) Indra Sahdan Daud (Singapore) Egmar Gonçalves (7 goals each)

The 2004 AFC Cup was the first edition of the AFC Cup, played by clubs from nations who are members of the Asian Football Confederation.

== Qualification ==
The 'developing' 14 nations in the Asian Football Confederation were invited to nominate one or two clubs to participate in the 2004 competition.

West and Central Asia Zone Group stage direct entrants
Team	Qualifying method
(Syria) Al-Jaish	2002–03 Syrian League champions
(Syria) Al-Wahda	2002–03 Syrian Cup winners
(Lebanon) Olympic Beirut	2002–03 Lebanese Premier League champions 2003 Lebanese FA Cup winners
(Lebanon) Al-Nejmeh	2002–03 Lebanese Premier League runners-up
(Oman) Dhofar	2002–03 Omani League runners-up
(Yemen) Al-Sha'ab Ibb	2002–03 Yemeni League champions
(Turkmenistan) Nisa Aşgabat	2003 Turkmenistan League champions
(Turkmenistan) Nebitçi Balkanabat	2003 Turkmenistan Cup winners

East Asia Zone Group stage direct entrants
Team	Qualifying method
(Hong Kong) Happy Valley	2002–03 Hong Kong First Division League champions
(Maldives) Valencia	2003 Dhivehi League champions
(Maldives) Island	2003 Maldives FA Cup winners
(Bangladesh) Muktijoddha Sangsad	2003 Bangladesh National Football League champions 2003 Bangladesh Federation Cup winners
(India) East Bengal	2002–03 Indian National Football League champions
(India) Mahindra United	2003 Indian Federation Cup winners
(Malaysia) Perak	2003 Malaysia Premier 1 League champions
(Malaysia) Negeri Sembilan	2003 Malaysia FA Cup winners
(Singapore) Home United	2003 S.League champions 2003 Singapore Cup winners
(Singapore) Geylang United	2003 S.League runners-up

== Group stage ==
=== Group A ===
Pos	Team	Pld	W	D	L	GF	GA	GD	Pts	Qualification
1	(Lebanon) Al-Nejmeh	6	5	1	0	11	2	+9	16	Advance to Quarter-finals
2	(Turkmenistan) Nisa Aşgabat	5	2	1	2	3	4	−1	7	
3	(Yemen) Al-Sha'ab Ibb	5	2	1	2	7	7	0	7	
4	(Bangladesh) Muktijoddha Sangsad	6	0	1	5	2	10	−8	1	

11 February 2004

Al-Nejmeh (Lebanon)	3–0	(Yemen) Al-Sha'ab Ibb
Ivanković 62'; Nasseredine 82', 89'	Report

Sports City, Beirut, Lebanon
Attendance: 300
Referee: Abdulrahman Abdou (Qatar)
11 February 2004

Nisa Aşgabat (Turkmenistan)	1–0	(Bangladesh) Muktijoddha Sangsad
Nazarov 69' (pen.)	Report

Nisa Stadium, Asgabat, Turkmenistan
Attendance: 500
Referee: Ali Al Mutlaq (Saudi Arabia)

25 April 2004

Al Sha'ab Ibb (Yemen)	0–1	(Turkmenistan) Nisa Aşgabat
	Report	Zemskov 50'

Al Thawra Sports City, Sana'a, Yemen
Attendance: 5,000
Referee: (Syria) Abdulrahman Recho
25 February 2004

Muktijoddha Sangsad KS (Bangladesh)	0–1	(Lebanon) Al-Nejmeh
	Report	Kassas 72'

Sultan Qaboos Sports Complex, Muscat, Oman
Attendance: 109
Referee: (United Arab Emirates) Mohamed Al Saeedi

6 April 2004

Al-Nejmeh (Lebanon)	3–1	(Turkmenistan) Nisa Aşgabat
Mohammad Kassas 12' (pen.), 47'; Ali Nasereddine 37'	Report	Didar Hajiev 34'

Al Thawra Sports City, Sana'a, Yemen
Attendance: 6,000
Referee: (Iraq) Kadhum Auda Lazim
7 April 2004

Al Sha'ab Ibb (Yemen)	3–0 ^{1}	(Bangladesh) Muktijoddha Sangsad KS
	Report

King Abdullah Stadium, Amman, Jordan
Attendance: 1,000
Referee: (Iran) Hedayat Mombini

20 April 2004

Muktijoddha Sangsad KS (Bangladesh)	2–3	(Yemen) Al Sha'ab Ibb
Charles Ghansa 1'; Saifur Rahman Moni 38'	Report	Abdulsalam Al Ghurbani 34', 60'; Redwan Ahmed 78'

Sports City, Beirut, Lebanon
Attendance: 3,000
Referee: (Tajikistan) Dilovar Orzuev
20 April 2004

Nisa Aşgabat (Turkmenistan)	0–1	(Lebanon) Al-Nejmeh
	Report	Mohammad Kassas 71'

Sultan Qaboos Sports Complex, Muscat, Oman
Attendance: 200
Referee: (Uzbekistan) Rustam Saidov

4 May 2004

Al Sha'ab Ibb (Yemen)	1–1	(Lebanon) Al-Nejmeh
Al-Nono 51'	Report	Mohammad Kassas 8'

Al Thawra Sports City, Sana'a, Yemen
Attendance: 2,500
Referee: (China) Huang Junjie
5 May 2004

Muktijoddha Sangsad KS (Bangladesh)	0–0	(Turkmenistan) Nisa Aşgabat
	Report

Sultan Qaboos Sports Complex, Muscat, Oman
Attendance: 150
Referee: (Kuwait) Saad Al Fadhli

19 May 2004

Nisa Aşgabat (Turkmenistan)	Cancelled^{2}	(Yemen) Al Sha'ab Ibb
	Report

King Abdullah Stadium, Amman, Jordan
Attendance: 100
Referee: (Thailand) Chaiwat Kunsuta
19 May 2004

Al-Nejmeh (Lebanon)	2–0	(Bangladesh) Muktijoddha Sangsad KS
Errol McFarlane 8'; Moussa Hojeij 90'	Report

Sports City, Beirut, Lebanon
Referee: (Kyrgyzstan) Kadyrbek Chynybekov

^{1}Al Sha'ab Ibb were awarded a 3–0 win as Muktijoddha Sangsad KS did not show up for the match.
^{2}The match was cancelled after a general strike in Yemen left Al Sha'ab Ibb unable to show up for the match.

=== Group B ===
Pos	Team	Pld	W	D	L	GF	GA	GD	Pts	Qualification
1	(Syria) Al-Wahda	4	2	2	0	8	2	+6	8	Advance to Quarter-finals
2	(Oman) Dhofar	4	1	1	2	6	7	−1	4	
3	(India) Mahindra United	4	1	1	2	5	10	−5	4	

11 February 2004

Mahindra United (India)	2–1	(Oman) Dhofar
Shanmugam Venkatesh 21'; Abhishek Yadav 66'	(Report)	Faraj A. Bait Alseem 55'

Javaharalal Nehru Stadium, Goa, India
Attendance: 400
Referee: J Karim
25 February 2004

Dhofar (Oman)	1–1	(Syria) Al-Wahda
Al-Ghafri 83'	(Report)	Nabil Al Shahmeh 22'

Nisa Stadium, Ashgabat, Turkmenistan
Attendance: 100
Referee: A Al-Enezi

7 April 2004

Mahindra United (India)	0–0	(Syria) Al-Wahda
	(Report)

Javaharalal Nehru Stadium, Goa, India
Attendance: 2,500
Referee: M Moradi
21 April 2004

Al-Wahda (Syria)	5–1	(India) Mahindra United
Nabil Al Shahmeh 36'; Iyad Mando 39' 53'; Moussa Traoré 69', 73'	(Report)	Felix Abaoagye 84'

Amman International Stadium, Amman, Jordan
Attendance: 2,000
Referee: Abdullah Balideh (Qatar)

5 May 2004

Dhofar (Oman)	4–2	(India) Mahindra United
Saif Sultan 27', 47'; Mohammed Al Shidad 35'; Gabriel 61'	(Report)	Felix Abaoagye 55'; Raphaël Patron Akakpo 80'

Sports City, Beirut, Lebanon
Attendance: 3,500
Referee: F Al Marzouqi
19 May 2004

Al-Wahda (Syria)	2–0	(Oman) Dhofar
Maher Al Sayed 20'; Moussa Traoré 54'	(Report)

Sultan Qaboos Sports Complex, Muscat, Oman
Attendance: 200
Referee: S Tongkhan

=== Group C ===
Pos	Team	Pld	W	D	L	GF	GA	GD	Pts	Qualification
1	(Syria) Al-Jaish	4	2	2	0	8	0	+8	8	Advance to Quarter-finals
2	(Lebanon) Olympic Beirut	4	2	1	1	4	3	+1	7	Advance to Quarter-finals
3	(Turkmenistan) Nebitçi Balkanabat	4	0	1	3	1	10	−9	1	

10 February 2004

Olympic Beirut (Lebanon)	0–0	(Syria) Al-Jaish
	(Report)

Sultan Qaboos Sports Complex, Muscat, Oman
Attendance: 400
Referee: J Karim
25 February 2004

Al-Jaish (Syria)	6–0	(Turkmenistan) Nebitçi Balkanabat
Zyad Chaabo 36'; Raghdan Shehadeh 50'; Rabih Hassan 55' 64'; Ahmad Omaier 69' 87'	(Report)

Nisa Stadium, Ashgabat, Turkmenistan
Attendance: 100
Referee: A Al-Enezi

7 April 2004

Olympic Beirut (Lebanon)	2–0	(Turkmenistan) Nebitçi Balkanabat
Pierre Issa 65'; Youssef Mohamad 75'	(Report)

Sports City, Beirut, Lebanon
Attendance: 2,500
Referee: M Moradi
21 April 2004

Nebitçi Balkanabat (Turkmenistan)	1–2	(Lebanon) Olympic Beirut
Perman Begjanov 82'	(Report)	Youssef Mohamad 53', 75'

Amman International Stadium, Amman, Jordan
Attendance: 2,000
Referee: A Balideh

5 May 2004

Al-Jaish (Syria)	2–0	(Lebanon) Olympic Beirut
Ahmad Omaier 8'; Zyad Chaabo 86'	(Report)

Sports City, Beirut, Lebanon
Attendance: 3,500
Referee: F Al Marzouqi
19 May 2004

Nebitçi Balkanabat (Turkmenistan)	0–0	(Syria) Al-Jaish
	(Report)

Sultan Qaboos Sports Complex, Muscat, Oman
Attendance: 200
Referee: S Tongkhan

=== Group D ===
Pos	Team	Pld	W	D	L	GF	GA	GD	Pts	Qualification
1	(Singapore) Home United	6	4	2	0	19	5	+14	14	Advance to Quarter-finals
2	(Malaysia) Perak FA	6	4	2	0	11	6	+5	14	Advance to Quarter-finals
3	(Hong Kong) Happy Valley	6	1	0	5	7	14	−7	3	
4	(Maldives) Valencia	6	1	0	5	3	15	−12	3	

11 February 2004

Home United (Singapore)	5–1	(Hong Kong) Happy Valley
Egmar Goncalves 30', 66', 72'; Peres De Oliveira 53'; Indra Sahdan Daud 61'	(Report)	Martin Jancula 69'

Bishan Stadium, Singapore
Attendance: 369
Referee: K Matsumura
11 February 2004

Perak FA (Malaysia)	2–0	(Maldives) Valencia
Frank Seator 45', 60'	(Report)

Perak Stadium, Ipoh, Malaysia
Attendance: 1,500
Referee: M Al Yarimi

25 February 2004

Valencia (Maldives)	0–3	(Singapore) Home United
	(Report)	Egmar Goncalves 37', 43'; Peres De Oliveira 60'

National Stadium, Malé, Maldives
Attendance: 8,000
Referee: S Sarkar
25 February 2004

Happy Valley (Hong Kong)	1–2	(Malaysia) Perak FA
Gerard Guy Ambassa 6'	(Report)	Frank Seator 72'; Muhamad Khalid Jamlus 80'

Mong Kok Stadium, Hong Kong
Attendance: 1,500
Referee: C Win

6 April 2004

Valencia (Maldives)	2–1	(Hong Kong) Happy Valley
Ali Ashfaq 73', 60'	(Report)	Lawrence Akandu 50'

National Stadium, Malé, Maldives
Attendance: 6,000
Referee: S Mujghef
6 April 2004

Perak FA (Malaysia)	2–2	(Singapore) Home United
Muhamad Khalid Jamlus 56'; Frank Seator 77'	(Report)	Egmar Goncalves 2'; Sutee Suksomkit 18'

Perak Stadium, Ipoh
Attendance: 200
Referee: A Al-Enezi

20 April 2004

Home United (Singapore)	2–2	(Malaysia) Perak FA
Sutee Suksomkit 7' (pen.); Liew Kit Kong 35' (o.g.)	(Report)	Muhamad Khalid Jamlus 14'; V. Saravanan 90'

Bishan Stadium, Singapore
Attendance: 1,100
Referee: A Albadwawi
21 April 2004

Happy Valley (Hong Kong)	3–1	(Maldives) Valencia
Lawrence Akandu 2', 42'; Gerard Guy Ambassa 82'	(Report)	Ali Ashfaq 72'

Mong Kok Stadium, Hong Kong
Attendance: 500
Referee: Tan Hai

5 May 2004

Valencia (Maldives)	0–1	(Malaysia) Perak FA
	(Report)	Luciano Goux 41'

National Stadium, Male, Maldives
Attendance: 3,000
Referee: R Gosh
5 May 2004

Happy Valley (Hong Kong)	0–2	(Singapore) Home United
	(Report)	Indra Sahdan Daud 15'; Peres De Oliveira 90'

Mong Kok Stadium, Hong Kong
Attendance: 4,000
Referee: B Williams

19 May 2004

Home United (Singapore)	5–0	(Maldives) Valencia
Indra Sahdan Daud 32', 45', 71'; Mohamed Nizam 78' (o.g.); Peres De Oliveira 90'	(Report)

Bishan Stadium, Singapore
Attendance: 600
Referee: M Mansour
19 May 2004

Perak FA (Malaysia)	2–1	(Hong Kong) Happy Valley
Frank Seator 71'; Muhamad Khalid Jamlus 80'	(Report)	Gerard Guy Ambassa 6'

Perak Stadium, Ipoh
Attendance: 208
Referee: S Tongkhan

=== Group E ===
Pos	Team	Pld	W	D	L	GF	GA	GD	Pts	Qualification
1	(India) East Bengal	6	4	1	1	14	8	+6	13	Advance to Quarter-finals
2	(Singapore) Geylang United	6	4	1	1	12	5	+7	13	Advance to Quarter-finals
3	(Malaysia) Negeri Sembilan	6	2	0	4	11	9	+2	6	
4	(Maldives) Island	6	1	0	5	2	17	−15	3	

Source: AFC Cup 2004
10 February 2004

Geylang United (Singapore)	2–3	(India) East Bengal
Hafiz 40'; Jeyapal 90'	Report	Cristiano Jr. 45', 76'; Bijen 83'

Mong Kok Stadium, Hong Kong
Attendance: 369
Referee: Kazuhiko Matsumura (Japan)
10 February 2004

Negeri Sembilan (Malaysia)	6–0	(Maldives) Island
Effiong 19', 64', 71'; Ekpoki 30', 90'; K. Rajan 28'	Report

Perak Stadium, Ipoh
Attendance: 1,500
Referee: Mukhtar Al Yarimi (Yemen)

24 February 2004

Island (Maldives)	0–5	(Singapore) Geylang United
	Report	Hafiz 5'; Razali 44'; Nahar 49'; Noor 67', 84'

National Stadium, Malé
Attendance: 8,000
Referee: Subrata Sarkar (India)
25 February 2004

East Bengal (India)	4–2	(Malaysia) Negeri Sembilan
Okoro 9'; Cristiano Jr. 34' (pen.), 70'; Bhutia 77'	Report	K. Rajan 45'; Shahrin 64'

Salt Lake Stadium, Kolkata
Referee: C Win

7 April 2004

Island (Maldives)	1–2	(India) East Bengal
Sunain 72' (pen.)	Report	Bhutia 36'; Okoro 90'

National Stadium, Malé
Attendance: 6,000
Referee: Salem Mujghef (Jordan)
7 April 2004

Negeri Sembilan (Malaysia)	0–1	(Singapore) Geylang United
	Report	Duric 10'

Mong Kok Stadium, Hong Kong
Attendance: 200
Referee: Atallah Al Enezi (Kuwait)

21 April 2004

East Bengal (India)	3–0	(Maldives) Island
Douglas 9'; Cristiano Jr. 36'; Okoro 85'	Report

Salt Lake Stadium, Kolkata
Referee: Ali Al-Badwawi (United Arab Emirates)
21 April 2004

Geylang United (Singapore)	2–1	(Malaysia) Negeri Sembilan
Chang Hui 49'; Duric 71'	Report	Efendi 27'

Hàng Đẫy Stadium, Hanoi (Vietnam)
Attendance: 500
Referee: Tan Hai (China)

4 May 2004

Island (Maldives)	1–0	(Malaysia) Negeri Sembilan
Ismail 14'	Report

Hàng Đẫy Stadium, Hanoi (Vietnam)
Attendance: 3,000
Referee: Ram Krishna Ghosh (Bangladesh)
5 May 2004

East Bengal (India)	1–1	(Singapore) Geylang United
Okoro 76'	Report	Hill 33'

Salt Lake Stadium, Kolkata
Referee: Ben Williams (Australia)

18 May 2004

Geylang United (Singapore)	1–0	(Maldives) Island
Khairon 29'	Report

Tuanku Abdul Rahman Stadium, Seremban (Malaysia)
Attendance: 600
Referee: M Mansour
18 May 2004

Negeri Sembilan (Malaysia)	2–1	(India) East Bengal
Suharmin 23', 49'	Report	Cristiano Jr. 24'

Mong Kok Stadium, Hong Kong
Attendance: 208
Referee: S Tongkhan

=== Ranking of second-placed teams ===
Three best runners-up, one from groups A, B and C and two from groups D and E, qualify for the quarter-finals.

==== Group runners-up (West & Central Asia Zone) ====
Pos	Team	Pld	W	D	L	GF	GA	GD	Pts	Qualification
1	(Lebanon) Olympic Beirut	4	2	1	1	4	3	+1	7	Advance to Quarter-finals
2	(Turkmenistan) Nisa Aşgabat	5	2	1	2	3	4	−1	7	
3	(Oman) Dhofar	4	1	1	2	6	7	−1	4	

==== Group runners-up (East, South & South East Asia Zone) ====
Pos	Team	Pld	W	D	L	GF	GA	GD	Pts	Qualification
1	(Malaysia) Perak FA	6	4	2	0	12	6	+6	14	Advance to Quarter-finals
2	(Singapore) Geylang United	6	4	1	1	12	5	+7	13	Advance to Quarter-finals

== Knockout stage ==
=== Bracket ===
Quarter-finals
(Syria) Al-Wahda (a)	2	2	4
(Lebanon) Al-Nejmeh Beirut	1	3	4
(Malaysia) Perak FA	1	2	3
(Singapore) Geylang United	2	3	5
(India) East Bengal	0	0	0
(Syria) Al-Jaish	0	3	3
(Lebanon) Olympic Beirut	3	1	4
(Singapore) Home United	3	2	5

Semi-Finals
(Syria) Al-Wahda	1	1	2
(Singapore) Geylang United	1	0	1
(Syria) Al-Jaish	4	2	6
(Singapore) Home United	0	1	1

Final
(Syria) Al-Wahda	2	1	3
(Syria) Al-Jaish (a)	3	0	3

=== Quarter-finals ===
Team 1	Agg.	Team 2	1st leg	2nd leg
Al-Wahda (Syria)	4–4 (a)	(Lebanon) Al-Nejmeh	2–1	2–3
Perak FA (Malaysia)	3–5	(Singapore) Geylang United	1–2	2–3
East Bengal (India)	0–3	(Syria) Al-Jaish	0–0	0–3
Olympic Beirut (Lebanon)	4–5	(Singapore) Home United	3–3	1–2

==== Matches ====
14 September 2004

Al-Wahda (Syria)	2–1	(Lebanon) Al-Nejmeh
Mando 86'; Al Sayed 89'		Mohammad Kassas 50'

Abbasiyyin Stadium, Damascus
Attendance: 15,000
21 September 2004

Al-Nejmeh (Lebanon)	3–2	(Syria) Al-Wahda
Hojeij 21'; Savane 33'; Nasereddine 65'		Traoré 19'; Mando 34'

Saida Municipal Stadium, Sidon
Attendance: 12,000

3–3 on aggregate; Al-Wahda won on away goals.

14 September 2004

Perak FA (Malaysia)	1–2	(Singapore) Geylang United
Seator 90'		Duric 49'; Fazrul Nawaz 60'

Perak Stadium, Ipoh
Attendance: 5,000
21 September 2004

Geylang United (Singapore)	3–2	(Malaysia) Perak FA
Hasrin Jailani 12'; Aleksandar Duric 27'; Fazrul Nawaz 41'		Syamsul Mohamed Saad 55'; R. Surendran 90+1'

Bedok Stadium, Singapore
Attendance: 2,227

Geylang United won 5–3 on aggregate.

15 September 2004

East Bengal (India)	0–0	(Syria) Al-Jaish

Salt Lake Stadium, Kolkata
Attendance: 15,000
22 September 2004

Al-Jaish (Syria)	3–0	(India) East Bengal
Abdullah 16'; Al Zeno 50'; Esmaeel 87'

Abbasiyyin Stadium, Damascus
Attendance: 15,000

Al-Jaish won 3–0 on aggregate.

15 September 2004

Olympic Beirut (Lebanon)	3–3	(Singapore) Home United
Atwi 18'; Alozian 40'; Antar 60'		Daud 28', 79'; Goncalves 83'

Tripoli Municipal Stadium, Tripoli
Attendance: 500
22 September 2004

Home United (Singapore)	2–1	(Lebanon) Olympic Beirut
Abdullah 69', 74'		Ali 63'

Bishan Stadium, Singapore
Attendance: 1,961

Home United won 5–4 on aggregate.

=== Semi-finals ===
Team 1	Agg.	Team 2	1st leg	2nd leg
Al-Wahda (Syria)	2–1	(Singapore) Geylang United	1–1	1–0
Al-Jaish (Syria)	6–1	(Singapore) Home United	4–0	2–1

==== Matches ====
19 October 2004

Al-Wahda (Syria)	1–1	(Singapore) Geylang United
Jaafar 85'	Report	Duric 63'

Abbasiyyin Stadium, Damascus
Attendance: 16,000
26 October 2004

Geylang United (Singapore)	0–1	(Syria) Al-Wahda
	Report	Traoré 12'

Bedok Stadium, Singapore
Attendance: 1,568

Al-Wahda won 2–1 on aggregate.

20 October 2004

Al-Jaish (Syria)	4–0	(Singapore) Home United
Al Zeno 34'; Esmaeel 53', 62'; Al-Hilou 76'	Report

Abbasiyyin Stadium, Damascus
Attendance: 6,000
27 October 2004

Home United (Singapore)	1–2	(Syria) Al-Jaish
Sivakumar 17'	Report	Al Zeno 76'; Chaabo 90+1'

Bishan Stadium, Singapore
Attendance: 1,612

Al-Jaish won 6–1 on aggregate.

=== Final ===
Team 1	Agg.	Team 2	1st leg	2nd leg
Al-Wahda (Syria)	3–3 (a)	(Syria) Al-Jaish	2–3	1–0

==== Matches ====
19 November 2004

Al-Wahda (Syria)	2–3	(Syria) Al-Jaish
Radawi 49'; Akil 90+2'	Report	Chaabo 3'; Esmaeel 32'; Al-Abtah 55' (pen.)

Abbasiyyin Stadium, Damascus
Attendance: 30,000
26 November 2004

Al-Jaish (Syria)	0–1	(Syria) Al-Wahda
	Report	Al Shahmeh 72'

Abbasiyyin Stadium, Damascus
Attendance: 17,000

3–3 on aggregate; Al-Jaish won on away goals.

2004 AFC Cup Winners
Al-Jaish
First title

== Statistics ==
=== Top goalscorers ===
Rank	Player	Club	MD1	MD2	MD3	MD4	MD5	MD6	QF1	QF2	SF1	SF2	F1	F2	Total
1	(Singapore) Indra Sahdan Daud	(Singapore) Home United	1				1	3	2						7
1	(Singapore) Egmar Goncalves	(Singapore) Home United	3	2	1				1						7
3	(Brazil) Cristiano Júnior	(India) East Bengal	2	2		1		1							6
3	(Liberia) Frank Seator	(Malaysia) Perak	2	1	1			1	1						6
3	(Lebanon) Mohammad Kassas	(Lebanon) Al-Nejmeh		1	2	1	1		1						6
6	(Guinea) Moussa Traoré	(Syria) Al-Wahda				2		1		1		1			5
6	(Bosnia and Herzegovina) Aleksandar Durić	(Singapore) Geylang United			1	1			1	1	1				5

== See also ==
- AFC Champions League 2004
