= Egmar Gonçalves =

Singaporean footballer (born 1970)

Personal information
- Date of birth: 15 August 1970 (age 56)
- Place of birth: Vila Velha, Brazil
- Height: 1.83 m (6 ft 0 in)
- Position: Striker

Senior career*
Years	Team	Apps	(Gls)
1991	Itaperuna	0	(0)
1992	Rio Branco	0	(0)
1993–1994	Bayer	0	(0)
1995	Madureira	0	(0)
1996–1998	Home United	65	(50)
1999	Serra	0	(0)
2000–2006	Home United	190	(152)
2007	Desportiva Capixaba	9	(4)

International career
2002–2006	Singapore	15	(4)
- * Club domestic league appearances and goals

Egmar Gonçalves (born 15 August 1970) is a former professional footballer. Born in Brazil, he played for the Singapore national team.

== Club career ==
During his time with Singaporean club Home United, Gonçalves scored a total of 239 S.League goals in 10 S.League seasons and was the first recipient of the 100 S.League goals award in 2001, although he had managed 107 by the end of that season. He reached the 100 goals mark in a hat-trick against Singapore Armed Forces in a 4–0 win. It was due to the S.League deciding not to include the inaugural Singapore Cup goals as it was known as the Singapore League Cup but backtracked on it later. He was also awarded the 200 S.League goals award in 2004 which he reached the mark, in a hat-trick again, against Sinchi in a 5–1 win.

Gonçalves was the top scorer in the S.League in 2004 and joint top scorer with Indra Sahdan Daud in the AFC Cup.

In January 2007, Gonçalves returned to Brazil after failing to agree a new contract with Home United. He was then the all-time top scorer in the S.League until Mirko Grabovac overtook his record the same year.

Gonçalves then played for Desportiva Capixaba in Espírito Santo where he retired following the end of the season.

== International career ==
Gonçalves made his debut for the Singapore national team in 2002, scoring a goal in a 2–0 friendly win over Maldives on 9 April 2002. He played for Singapore in the 2004 and 2007 AFC Asian Cup qualifying campaigns.

== Personal life ==
Gonçalves lives in Vila Velha city, Brazil, with his wife and children.

== Career statistics ==
Goals for Senior National Team

#	Date	Venue	Opponent	Score	Result	Competition
1.	11 December 2002	Bishan Stadium, Singapore	Maldives	2–0	2–0	Friendly
2.	11 December 2002	Singapore National Stadium, Singapore	Philippines	1–0	2–0	Friendly
3.	11 December 2002	Jalan Besar Stadium, Singapore	Kuwait	1–1	1–3	2004 AFC Asian Cup qualification
4.	11 October 2006	Al Ain City, UAE	Iraq	1–0	2–4	2007 AFC Asian Cup qualification

== Honours ==
Home United

- S.League: 1999, 2003
- Singapore Cup: 2000, 2001, 2003, 2005

Individual

- 100 S.League Goals: 2001
- 200 S.League Goals: 2004
- S.League Top Scorer Award: 2004
- AFC Cup Top Scorer Award: 2004
