= AFC Champions League Two =

Annual second-tier Asian club football competition

- Organiser(s): AFC
- Founded: 2004; 22 years ago (as AFC Cup)
- Region: Asia
- Teams: 32 (group stage)
- Qualifier for: AFC Champions League Elite
- Related competitions: AFC Champions League Elite (1st tier); AFC Challenge League (3rd tier)
- Current champions: (Japan) Gamba Osaka (1st title)
- Most championships: Al-Kuwait (Iraq) Al-Quwa Al-Jawiya (3 titles each)
- Website: www.the-afc.com
- 2026–27 AFC Champions League Two

The AFC Champions League Two (abbreviated as the ACL Two or ACL2) is an annual continental club football competition organised by the Asian Football Confederation. It is the second-tier competition of Asian club football system, ranked below the AFC Champions League Elite and above the AFC Challenge League. The competition was founded in 2004 as the AFC Cup.

Its the UEFA Europa League equivalent in Asia ((AFC). Initially started for clubs from nations that did not receive direct qualifying slots to the top-tier AFC Champions League. The competition rebranded to its current name in 2024. In a bid to increase competitiveness, its format was also changed to include clubs from higher ranked AFC member associations, and the prize money was increased.

Clubs qualify for the competition based on their performance in national leagues and cup competitions. Participation in the competition is open to clubs from the top 12 nations in the East and the West region based on the AFC club competitions ranking. The participant from each nation ranked 1–6 in each region is the highest-placed club in that nation that did not qualify for the AFC Champions League Elite. The nations ranked 7–12 in each region enter their top club(s) directly to the AFC Champions League Two.

The winner of the AFC Champions League Two will be allocated an indirect preliminary stage slot for the next AFC Champions League Elite season, if they have not already qualified through domestic competition. The current champions of the competition is Gamba Osaka, who defeated Al-Nassr in the 2026 final. Al-Kuwait and Al-Quwa Al-Jawiya are the most successful clubs in the competition's history, having won three titles each. Clubs from Kuwait have won four titles, making them the most successful nation in the competition.

== History ==
Winners
Season	Winners
AFC Cup
2004	(Syria) Al-Jaish
2005	(Jordan) Al-Faisaly
2006	(Jordan) Al-Faisaly (2)
2007	(Jordan) Shabab Al-Ordon
2008	(Bahrain) Al-Muharraq
2009	Kuwait SC
2010	(Syria) Al-Ittihad Aleppo
2011	(Uzbekistan) Nasaf Qarshi
2012	Kuwait SC (2)
2013	Kuwait SC (3)
2014	(Kuwait) Qadsia
2015	(Malaysia) Johor Darul Ta'zim
2016	(Iraq) Al-Quwa Al-Jawiya
2017	(Iraq) Al-Quwa Al-Jawiya (2)
2018	(Iraq) Al-Quwa Al-Jawiya (3)
2019	(Lebanon) Al-Ahed
2020	Cancelled (Note: Due to the COVID-19 pandemic in Asia.)
2021	(Bahrain) Al-Muharraq (2)
2022	(Oman) Al-Seeb
2023–24	(Australia) Central Coast Mariners
AFC Champions League Two
2024–25	(United Arab Emirates) Sharjah
2025–26	(Japan) Gamba Osaka

The AFC Cup began in 2004 as a second-tier competition to relate back to the AFC Champions League, as 14 countries that had developing status competed in the first competition, with 18 teams being nominated. The winners and three runners-up would then head to the knock-out stage. Al-Jaish took the first AFC Cup after they defeated fellow Syrian opponents Al-Wahda on away goals.

In 2005, 18 teams competed from nine nations with the nations still being allowed to choose from one or two teams entering. After Syrian teams left the AFC Cup to try at the AFC Champions League for four years, Al-Faisaly defeated Nejmeh in the final. With it, Jordanian teams would win the next two AFC Cup seasons with Bahrain joining the league while Bangladesh was relegated to the AFC President's Cup until the tournament's abolition in 2014.

Al-Muharraq would break the trend in 2008 as they won the last two-legged final before it headed back into a one-leg system, a rule that was never changed until now.

On 23 December 2022, it was announced that the AFC competition structure would change from the established formats from the 2024–25 season. A new second-tier tournament called the AFC Champions League Two would be introduced. Meanwhile, a new third-tier competition was also launched under the name AFC Challenge League.

On 24 May 2024, AFC announced that the records and statistics of the preceding AFC club competitions will be recognised and integrated within the revamped club competitions, with the data from the AFC Cup transferring to the AFC Champions League Two.

== Format ==
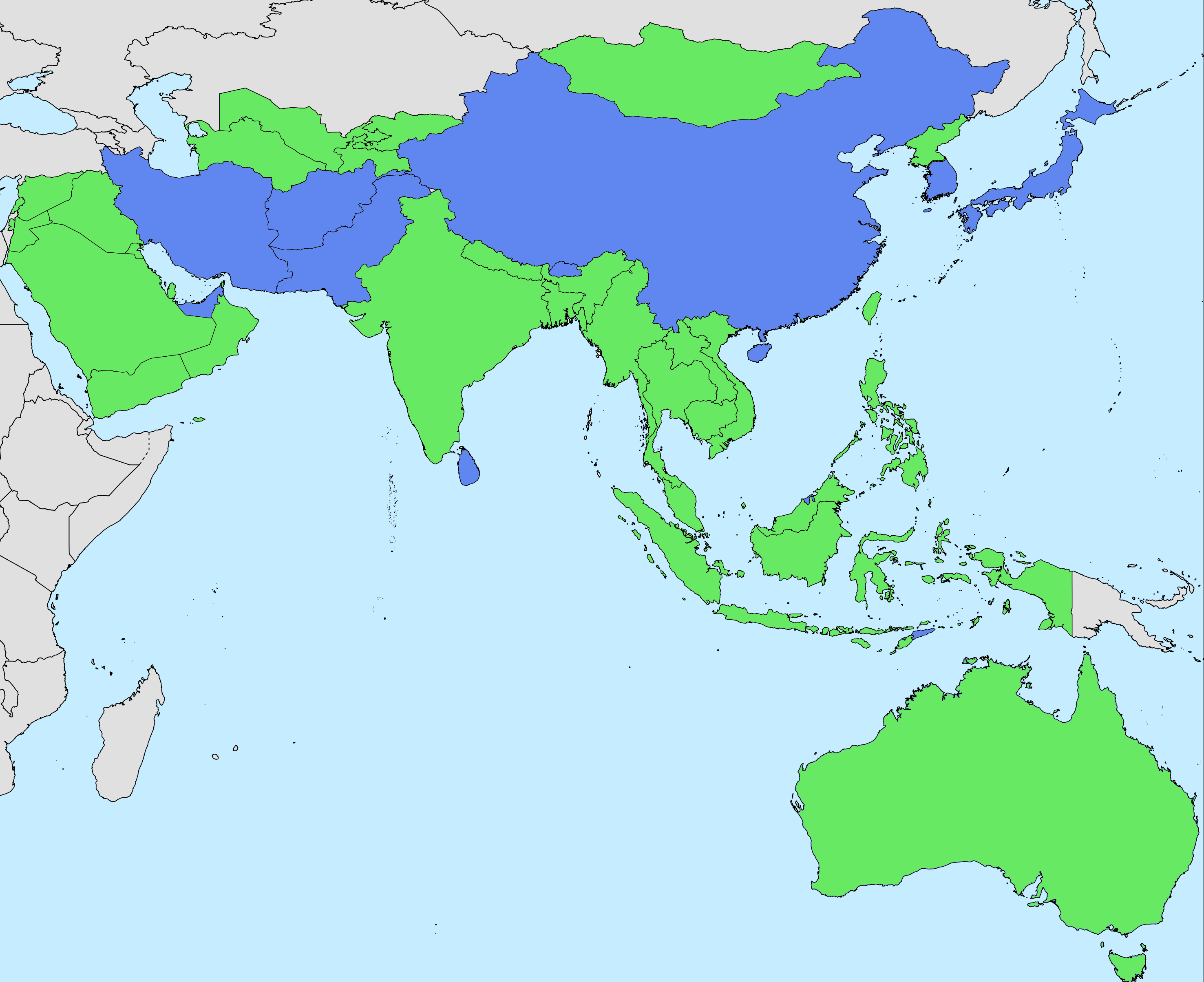
Map of AFC countries whose teams reached the group stage of the AFC Cup/ACL Two AFC member country that has been represented in the group stage AFC member country that has not been represented in the group stage

Some changes were applied in terms of teams and format for the 2017 AFC Cup. A total of 36 teams participated in the group stage (12 each from West Asia and ASEAN, and 4 each from East Asia, Central Asia, and South Asia). The final is played as a one-off match.

=== Allocation ===
The allocation of group stage teams by member country was listed below; asterisks represent occasions where at least one team was eliminated in qualification for the group stage. Those who had not reached the group stage but had only played in qualification are not bolded.

Associations	Spots																						
Associations	2004	2005	2006	2007	2008	2009	2010	2011	2012	2013	2014	2015	2016	2017	2018	2019	2020	2021	2022	2023–24	2024–25	2025–26	2026–27
EAFF
**China**	0	0	0	0	0	0	0	0	0	0	0	0	0	0	0	0	0	0	0	0	1	1	1
**Chinese Taipei**	0	0	0	0	0	0	0	0	0	0	0	0	0	0*	1	1	1*	1	1	2*	0	0	0
Guam	0	0	0	0	0	0	0	0	0	0	0	0	0	0*	0	0	0	0	0	0	0	0	0
**Hong Kong**	1	2	2	2	2	2	2	2	2	2	2	2	2	0	0	2	1	2	2	0	2	2	2
**Japan**	0	0	0	0	0	0	0	0	0	0	0	0	0	0	0	0	0	0	0	0	1	1	1
**Macau**	0	0	0	0	0	0	0	0	0	0	0	0	0*	0	1	0	1	0	0	1*	0	0	0
**Mongolia**	0	0	0	0	0	0	0	0	0	0	0	0	0*	1	0*	0*	0*	1	0*	1	0	0	0
**North Korea**	0	0	0	0	0	0	0	0	0	0	0	0	0	2	2	1*	0	0	0	0	0	0	0
**South Korea**	0	0	0	0	0	0	0	0	0	0	0	0	0	0	0	0	0	0	0	0	1	1	2*
Total	1	2	2	2	2	2	2	2	2	2	2	2	2	3	4	4	4	4	3	4	5	5	6
AFF
**Australia**	Part of OFC			0	0	0	0	0	0	0	0	0	0	0	0	0	0	0	0	2	1	1	2*
Brunei	0	0	0	0	0	0	0	0	0	0	0	0	0	0	0	0	0*	0*	0	0*	0	0	0
**Cambodia**	0	0	0	0	0	0	0	0	0	0	0	0	0	1*	1	1	1	2	2	1*	0	0	2
**Indonesia**	0	0	0	0	0	1	2	2	1	2	2	2	0	0	2	2	2	2	2	2*	1	1	1
**Laos**	0	0	0	0	0	0	0	0	0	0	0	1	1	0*	0*	1	1*	0*	1	0*	0	0	0
**Malaysia**	2	2	2	2	2	2	1	0	2	2	2	2	2	2	1	0	0	2	2	2	1	1	1
**Myanmar**	0	0	0	0	0	0	0	0	2	2	2	2	2	2	2	2	2	0	0	1*	0	0	0
**Philippines**	0	0	0	0	0	0	0	0	0	0	0	1*	2	2	2	2	2	0	1	2	2	1*	0*
**Singapore**	2	2	2	2	2	1	1	1	2	2	2	2	2	2	2	2	2	2	2	1*	2	2	2
**Thailand**	0	0	0±	1	0	2	2	2	1	0	0	0	0	0	0	0	0	0	0	0	3*	3*	1
Timor-Leste	0	0	0	0	0	0	0	0	0	0	0	0	0	0	0	0	0*	1	0	0	0	0	0
**Vietnam**	0	0	0	1	0	2	2	2	2	2	2	0	0	2	2	2	2	2	1	1	1	2	1
Total	4	4	4	6	4	8	8	7	10	10	10	10	9	11	12	12	12	11	11	12	11	11	10
SAFF
**Bangladesh**	1	2	2	0	0	0	0	0	0	0	0	0*	1	1*	1*	1	1*	1*	1*	1*	0	0	0
Bhutan	0	0	0	0	0	0	0	0	0	0	0	0	0*	0*	0*	0*	0*	0*	0*	0*	0	0	0
**India**	2	2	2	2	2	2	2	2	2	2	2	2	2	2	2	2	1*	2	2	2	0*	1*	1*
**Maldives**	2	2	2	2	2	2	2	2	1*	2	2	2	2	1*	1*	0	2	1*	1*	1*	0	0	0
**Nepal**	0	0	0	0	0	0	0	0	0	0	0	0*	0	0*	0	1	0	0*	0*	0*	0	0	0
Pakistan	0	0	0	0	0	0	0	0	0	0	0	0	0*	0	0	0	0	0	0	0	0	0	0
Sri Lanka	0	0	0	0	0	0	0	0	0	0	0	0	0	0*	0	0*	0*	0*	0*	0	0	0	0
Total	5	6	6	4	4	4	4	4	3	4	4	4	5	4	4	4	4	4	4	4	0	1	1
CAFA
Afghanistan	0	0	0	0	0	0	0	0	0	0	0	0	0	0*	0	0	0	0	0	0	0	0	0
**Iran**	0	0	0	0	0	0	0	0	0	0	0	0	0	0	0	0	0	0	0	0	2*	2*	1
**Kyrgyzstan**	0	0	0	0	0	0	0	0	0	0	1	0*	0*	2	1*	1*	2	2	2	1*	0	0	0
**Tajikistan**	0	0	0	0	0	0	0	0	0	2	1	1*	1*	1*	1*	2	2	2	2	1*	2	1*	0
**Turkmenistan**	2	2	2	2	0	0	0	0	0	0	0	1*	1*	1*	2	1*	2	2	2	2*	1*	2*	1
**Uzbekistan**	0	0	0	0	0	1	1	2	1	0	0	0	0	0	0	0	1	1	1	0	1	1	1
Total	2	2	2	2	0	1	1	2	1	2	2	2	2	4	4	4	7	7	7	4	6	6	3
WAFF
**Bahrain**	0	0	1	1	2	2	1	0	0	1	2	2	2	2	2	2	2	2	2	1*	1*	2	2
**Iraq**	0	0	0	0	0	2	0	3	2	2	2	2	2	2	2	0	0	0	0	2	1	1	1
**Jordan**	0	2	2	3	2	2	2	2	2	2	2	2	2	2	2	2	2	2	0	1	2	2	2*
**Kuwait**	0	0	0	0	0	2	3	3	3	2	2	2	0	0	0	2	2	1	2	2	1*	0	1*
**Lebanon**	2	2	2	2	2	3	2	2	2	2	2	2	2	2	2	2	2	2	2	2	0	0	0
**Oman**	1	0	1	2	2	2	2	2	2	2	2	1*	2	2	2	1*	1*	0	2	1*	0	0*	2
**Palestine**	0	0	0	0	0	0	0	0	0	0	0*	1*	2	0*	0*	1	1	2	2	1*	0	0	0
**Qatar**	0	0	0	0	0	0	1	0	0	0	0	0	0	0	0	0	0	0	0	0	1	1	1
**Saudi Arabia**	0	0	0	0	0	0	0	0	1	0	0	0	0	0	0	0	0	0	0	0	1	1	1
**Syria**	2	0	0	0	0	2	3	3	2	1*	2	2	2	2	2	2	2	2	2	2*	0	0	0
**United Arab Emirates**	0	0	0	0	0	0	0	0	0	0	0	0	0	0	0	0	0	0	0	0	2*	1	2*
**Yemen**	1	0	0	2	2	2	2	2	2	2	0*	0*	0	0	0	0	0	0	0	0	0	0	0
Total	6	4	6	10	10	17	16	17	16	14	14	14	14	12	12	12	12	11	12	12	9	8	12
Total																							
Finals	**18**	**18**	**20**	**24**	**20**	**32**	**31**	**32**	**32**	**32**	**32**	**32**	**32**	**34**	**36**	**36**	**39**	**37**	**37**	**36**	**31**	**31**	**32**
Qualifying	18	18	20	24	20	32	31	32	33	33	34	41	40	50	44	43	48	43	43	49	33	34	35

== Prize money ==
The prize money as of the 2024–25 AFC Champions League Two are as follows, in United States dollar (USD):

Round	Teams	Amount	
Round	Teams	Per team	Total
Final (Champions)	1	$2.5 million	
Final (Runners-up)	1	$1 million	
Semi-finals	4	$240,000	$960,000
Quarter-finals	8	$160,000	$1,280,000
Round of 16	16	$80,000	$1,280,000
Group stage	32	$300,000	$9,600,000
Total	32	$16,620,000	

== Marketing ==
=== Sponsorship ===
The tournament has been sponsored by a group of multinational corporations, in contrast to the single main sponsor typically found in national top-flight leagues.

Official Global Partners

- Neom
- Qatar Airways
- Visit Saudi

Official Global Supporters

- Aspetar
- Kelme
- Midea
- Tecno Mobile
- Visa Inc.

== Records and statistics ==
=== Results ===
List of AFC Cup and AFC Champions League Two finals
Season	Winners	Score	Runners-up	Venue	Attendance
AFC Cup era (2004–2024)
Two-legged format
2004	(Syria) Al-Jaish	3–2	(Syria) Al-Wahda	Abbasiyyin Stadium, Damascus, Syria	
2004	(Syria) Al-Jaish	0–1	(Syria) Al-Wahda	Abbasiyyin Stadium, Damascus, Syria	
2004	Aggregate 3–3, Al-Jaish won on away goals.				
2005	(Jordan) Al-Faisaly	1–0	(Lebanon) Nejmeh	Amman International Stadium, Amman, Jordan	
2005	(Jordan) Al-Faisaly	3–2	(Lebanon) Nejmeh	Rafic Hariri Stadium, Beirut, Lebanon	
2005	Al-Faisaly won 4–2 on aggregate.				
2006	(Jordan) Al-Faisaly	3–0	(Bahrain) Al-Muharraq	Amman International Stadium, Amman, Jordan	7,000
2006	(Jordan) Al-Faisaly	2–4	(Bahrain) Al-Muharraq	Bahrain National Stadium, Riffa, Bahrain	3,000
2006	Al-Faisaly won 5–4 on aggregate.				
2007	(Jordan) Shabab Al-Ordon	1–0	(Jordan) Al-Faisaly	Amman International Stadium, Amman, Jordan	5,500
2007	(Jordan) Shabab Al-Ordon	1–1	(Jordan) Al-Faisaly	Amman International Stadium, Amman, Jordan	7,500
2007	Shabab Al-Ordon won 2–1 on aggregate.				
2008	(Bahrain) Al-Muharraq	5–1	(Lebanon) Safa	Bahrain National Stadium, Riffa, Bahrain	6,000
2008	(Bahrain) Al-Muharraq	5–4	(Lebanon) Safa	Sports City Stadium, Beirut, Lebanon	2,000
2008	Al-Muharraq won 10–5 on aggregate.				
Single match format
2009	Al-Kuwait	2–1	(Syria) Al-Karamah	Al Kuwait Sports Club Stadium, Kuwait City, Kuwait	17,400
2010	(Syria) Al-Ittihad	1–1 (a.e.t.) (4–2 p)	(Kuwait) Al-Qadsia	Jaber International Stadium, Kuwait City, Kuwait	58,604
2011	(Uzbekistan) Nasaf	2–1	Al-Kuwait	Markaziy Stadium, Qarshi, Uzbekistan	15,753
2012	Al-Kuwait	4–0	(Iraq) Erbil	Franso Hariri Stadium, Erbil, Iraq	30,000
2013	Al-Kuwait	2–0	(Kuwait) Al-Qadsia	Al-Sadaqua Walsalam Stadium, Kuwait City, Kuwait	10,000
2014	(Kuwait) Al-Qadsia	0–0 (a.e.t.) (4–2 p)	(Iraq) Erbil	Maktoum Bin Rashid Al Maktoum Stadium, Dubai, UAE	5,240
2015	(Malaysia) Johor Darul Ta'zim	1–0	(Tajikistan) Istiklol	Pamir Stadium, Dushanbe, Tajikistan	18,000
2016	(Iraq) Al-Quwa Al-Jawiya	1–0	(India) Bengaluru	Suheim Bin Hamad Stadium, Doha, Qatar	5,806
2017	(Iraq) Al-Quwa Al-Jawiya	1–0	(Tajikistan) Istiklol	Hisor Central Stadium, Hisor, Tajikistan	20,000
2018	(Iraq) Al-Quwa Al-Jawiya	2–0	(Turkmenistan) Altyn Asyr	Basra International Stadium, Basra, Iraq	24,665
2019	(Lebanon) Al-Ahed	1–0	(North Korea) April 25	Kuala Lumpur Stadium, Kuala Lumpur, Malaysia	500
2020	Cancelled due to the COVID-19 pandemic in Asia.				
2021	(Bahrain) Al-Muharraq	3–0	(Uzbekistan) Nasaf	Al-Muharraq Stadium, Arad, Bahrain	9,060
2022	(Oman) Al-Seeb	3–0	(Malaysia) Kuala Lumpur City	Bukit Jalil National Stadium, Kuala Lumpur, Malaysia	27,722
2023–24	(Australia) Central Coast Mariners	1–0	(Lebanon) Al-Ahed	Sultan Qaboos Sports Complex, Muscat, Oman	1,930
AFC Champions League Two era (2024–present)
2024–25	(United Arab Emirates) Sharjah	2–1	(Singapore) Lion City Sailors	Bishan Stadium, Singapore	9,737
2025–26	(Japan) Gamba Osaka	1–0	(Saudi Arabia) Al-Nassr	King Saud University Stadium, Riyadh	25,207

=== Performance by club ===
Performances in the AFC Cup and AFC Champions League Two by club
Club	Winners	Runners-up	Years won	Years runners-up
Al-Kuwait	3	1	2009, 2012, 2013	2011
(Iraq) Al-Quwa Al-Jawiya	3	0	2016, 2017, 2018	
(Jordan) Al-Faisaly	2	1	2005, 2006	2007
(Bahrain) Al-Muharraq	2	1	2008, 2021	2006
(Kuwait) Al-Qadsia	1	2	2014	2010, 2013
(Uzbekistan) Nasaf Qarshi	1	1	2011	2021
(Lebanon) Al-Ahed	1	1	2019	2023–24
(Syria) Al-Jaish	1	0	2004	
(Jordan) Shabab Al-Ordon	1	0	2007	
(Syria) Al-Ittihad	1	0	2010	
(Malaysia) Johor Darul Ta'zim	1	0	2015	
(Oman) Al-Seeb	1	0	2022	
(Australia) Central Coast Mariners	1	0	2023–24	
(United Arab Emirates) Sharjah	1	0	2024–25	
(Japan) Gamba Osaka	1	0	2025–26	
(Iraq) Erbil	0	2		2012, 2014
(Tajikistan) Istiklol	0	2		2015, 2017
(Syria) Al-Wahda	0	1		2004
(Lebanon) Nejmeh	0	1		2005
(Lebanon) Safa	0	1		2008
(Syria) Al-Karamah	0	1		2009
(India) Bengaluru	0	1		2016
(Turkmenistan) Altyn Asyr	0	1		2018
(North Korea) April 25	0	1		2019
(Malaysia) Kuala Lumpur City	0	1		2022
(Singapore) Lion City Sailors	0	1		2024–25
(Saudi Arabia) Al-Nassr	0	1		2025–26

=== Performance by nation ===
Nation	Titles	Runners-up	Total
Kuwait	4	3	7
Iraq	3	2	5
Jordan	3	1	4
Syria	2	2	4
Bahrain	2	1	3
Lebanon	1	3	4
Uzbekistan	1	1	2
Malaysia	1	1	2
Oman	1	0	1
Australia	1	0	1
United Arab Emirates	1	0	1
Japan	1	0	1
Tajikistan	0	2	2
India	0	1	1
Turkmenistan	0	1	1
North Korea	0	1	1
Singapore	0	1	1
Saudi Arabia	0	1	1

=== Most Valuable Player ===
Season	Player	Club
2011	(Turkmenistan) Artur Gevorkyan	(Uzbekistan) Nasaf Qarshi
2012	(Brazil) Rogerinho	Al-Kuwait
2013	(Kuwait) Bader Al-Mutawa	(Kuwait) Al-Qadsia
2014	(Kuwait) Saif Al Hashan	(Kuwait) Al-Qadsia
2015	(Malaysia) Safiq Rahim	(Malaysia) Johor Darul Ta'zim
2016	(Iraq) Hammadi Ahmed	(Iraq) Al-Quwa Al-Jawiya
2017	(Tajikistan) Manuchekhr Dzhalilov	(Tajikistan) Istiklol
2018	(Iraq) Hammadi Ahmed	(Iraq) Al-Quwa Al-Jawiya
2019	(Lebanon) Mehdi Khalil	(Lebanon) Al-Ahed
2020	Cancelled due to the COVID-19 pandemic in Asia	
2021	(Bahrain) Abdulwahab Al-Malood	(Bahrain) Al-Muharraq
2022	(Oman) Eid Al-Farsi	(Oman) Al-Seeb
2023–24	(Brazil) Mikael Doka	(Australia) Central Coast Mariners
2024–25	(United Arab Emirates) Caio Lucas	(United Arab Emirates) Sharjah
2025–26	(Tunisia) Issam Jebali	(Japan) Gamba Osaka

=== Top scorers ===
Year	Player	Club	Goals
2004	(Singapore) Indra Sahdan Daud	(Singapore) Home United	7
2004	(Singapore) Egmar Goncalves	(Singapore) Home United	7
2005	(Jordan) Mo'ayyad Salim	(Jordan) Al-Faisaly	9
2006	(Jordan) Mahmoud Shelbaieh	(Jordan) Al-Wehdat	8
2007	(Jordan) Odai Al Saify	(Jordan) Shabab Al-Ordun	5
2007	(Lebanon) Mohammed Ghaddar	(Lebanon) Nejmeh	5
2008	(Brazil) Rico	(Bahrain) Al-Muharraq	19
2009	(Nigeria) Robert Akaruye	(Bahrain) Busaiteen	8
2009	(Syria) Mohamad Hamwi	(Syria) Al-Karamah	8
2009	(Syria) Jehad Al Hussain	Al-Kuwait	8
2009	(Vietnam) Huỳnh Kesley Alves	(Vietnam) Bình Dương	8
2010	(Brazil) Afonso Alves	(Qatar) Al-Rayyan	9
2011	(Montenegro) Ivan Bošković	(Uzbekistan) Nasaf Qarshi	10
2012	(Iraq) Amjad Radhi	(Iraq) Erbil	9
2012	(Syria) Raja Rafe	(Syria) Al-Shorta	9
2013	(Tunisia) Issam Jemâa	Al-Kuwait	16
2014	(Spain) Juan Belencoso	(Hong Kong) Kitchee	11
2015	(Australia) Daniel McBreen	(Hong Kong) South China	8
2015	(North Macedonia) Riste Naumov	(Myanmar) Ayeyawady United	8
2016	(Iraq) Hammadi Ahmed	(Iraq) Al-Quwa Al-Jawiya	16
2017	(North Korea) Kim Yu-song	(North Korea) April 25	9
2018	(North Korea) An Il-bom	(North Korea) April 25	12
2019	(Philippines) Bienvenido Marañón	(Philippines) Ceres–Negros	10
2020	(Philippines) Bienvenido Marañón	(Philippines) Ceres–Negros	5
2021	(Uzbekistan) Khusayin Norchaev	(Uzbekistan) Nasaf Qarshi	7
2022	(Uzbekistan) Jasur Hasanov	(Uzbekistan) Sogdiana Jizzakh	5
2022	(Malaysia) Paulo Josué	(Malaysia) Kuala Lumpur City	5
2022	(Brazil) Pedro Paulo	(Vietnam) Viettel	5
2023–24	(Brazil) Marco Túlio	(Australia) Central Coast Mariners	8
2024–25	(Iran) Sardar Azmoun	(United Arab Emirates) Shabab Al Ahli	9
2025–26	(Malta) Trent Buhagiar	(Singapore) Tampines Rovers	8

=== Winning coaches ===
Year	Club	Coach
2004	(Syria) Al-Jaish	(Romania) Costică Ștefănescu
2005	(Jordan) Al-Faisaly	(Serbia) Branko Smiljanić
2006	(Jordan) Al-Faisaly	(Iraq) Adnan Hamad
2007	(Jordan) Shabab Al-Ordon	(Syria) Nizar Mahrous
2008	(Bahrain) Al-Muharraq	(Bahrain) Salman Sharida
2009	Al-Kuwait	(Kuwait) Mohamad Abdulla
2010	(Syria) Al-Ittihad	(Romania) Valeriu Tița
2011	(Uzbekistan) Nasaf Qarshi	(Ukraine) Anatoliy Demyanenko
2012	Al-Kuwait	(Romania) Marin Ion
2013	Al-Kuwait	(Romania) Marin Ion
2014	(Kuwait) Al-Qadsia	(Spain) Antonio Puche
2015	(Malaysia) Johor Darul Ta'zim	(Argentina) Mario Gómez
2016	(Iraq) Al-Quwa Al-Jawiya	(Iraq) Basim Qasim
2017	(Iraq) Al-Quwa Al-Jawiya	(Syria) Hussam Al Sayed
2018	(Iraq) Al-Quwa Al-Jawiya	(Iraq) Basim Qasim
2019	(Lebanon) Al-Ahed	(Lebanon) Bassem Marmar
2021	(Bahrain) Al-Muharraq	(Bahrain) Isa Sadoon Al-Hamdani
2022	(Oman) Al-Seeb	(Oman) Rashid Jaber
2023–24	(Australia) Central Coast Mariners	(England) Mark Jackson
2024–25	(United Arab Emirates) Sharjah	(Romania) Cosmin Olăroiu
2025–26	(Japan) Gamba Osaka	(Germany) Jens Wissing

=== Top goalscorers ===
As of 11 March 2021

Rank	Player	Goals	Years	Club(s)
1	(Spain) (Philippines) Bienvenido Marañón	35	2016–2020	(Philippines) Ceres–Negros
2	(Jordan) Mahmoud Shelbaieh	34	2006–2016	(Jordan) Al-Wehdat
3	(Bosnia and Herzegovina) (Singapore) Aleksandar Đurić	32	2004–2014	Geylang United, Singapore Armed Forces, Tampines Rovers
3	(Iraq) Amjad Radhi	32	2011–2018	(Iraq) Erbil, Al-Quwa Al-Jawiya
5	(Kuwait) Bader Al-Mutawa	30	2010–2019	(Kuwait) Al-Qadsia
5	(Brazil) Rico	30	2006–2015	(Bahrain) Al-Muharraq, Al-Riffa, Al-Hidd
7	(Maldives) Ali Ashfaq	29	2004–2020	(Maldives) Club Valencia, New Radiant, VB Sports Club, TC Sports Club
8	(Brazil) Rogerinho	28	2009–2015	Al-Kuwait
9	(Spain) (Hong Kong) Jordi Tarrés	25	2012–2019	(Hong Kong) Kitchee
10	(North Korea) Kim Yu-song	24	2017–2019	(North Korea) April 25

== See also ==
- CONMEBOL Sudamericana – South American equivalent
- UEFA Europa League – European equivalent
- CAF Confederation Cup – African equivalent
- List of association football competitions
