= 2008 Lebanese Elite Cup =

Lebanese Elite Cup
- Season: 2008
- Champions: Al Ahed
- Matches: 9
- Goals: 29 (3.22 per match)

The Lebanese Elite Cup 2008 was the 11th edition of this football tournament in Lebanon. It was held from August 27 to September 11, 2008 in Beirut and Sidon. This tournament includes the five best teams from the 2007-08 Saison and the Cup Winner. Since Al-Mabarrah finished 4th in the league and won the cup, Shabab Al-Sahel qualified to the tournament too.

League champions Al Ahed won the tournament after beating Al-Ansar 3–1 in the final, it was the first win for Al Ahed in this tournament. Al Ahed players Salih Sadir and Hassan Maatouk were the top scorers of the Lebanese Elite Cup, scoring three goals each.

It was the first edition after a three-year break caused by the political protests and the 2006 Lebanon War. The draw took place on July 2, 2008 in Beirut.

== Teams ==
Club	City	2007-2008 season
Al Ahed	Beirut	Lebanese Premier League Champions
Al Ansar	Beirut	2nd in Lebanese Premier League
Nejmeh	Beirut	3rd in Lebanese Premier League
Al Mabarrah	Beirut	4th in Lebanese Premier League/Cup Winners
Safa Sporting Club	Beirut	5th in Lebanese Premier League
Shabab Al-Sahel	Beirut	6th in Lebanese Premier League

== Group stage ==
=== Group A ===
Team	Pld	W	D	L	GF	GA	GD	Pts
(Lebanon) Al Ansar	2	1	1	0	3	2	+1	4
(Lebanon) Shabab Al-Sahel	2	1	1	0	2	1	+1	4
(Lebanon) Al Mabarrah	2	0	0	2	1	3	−2	0

2008-08-27
17:30

Shabab Al-Sahel	1 – 0	Al Mabarrah
Ahmad Jaradi 34'

Saida Municipal Stadium, Sidon
Referee: Radwan Ghandour

2008-08-30
17:30

Al Ansar	1 – 1	Shabab Al-Sahel
Nasrat Al Jamal 9'		Zuhair Abdullah 89'

Saida Municipal Stadium, Sidon
Referee: Andre El Haddad

2008-09-02
21:30

Al Mabarrah	1 – 2	Al Ansar
Ahmad El Khasir 82' (o.g.)		Mohammed Baqir Younis 13'; Paul Rustom 38'

Camille Chamoun Sports City Stadium, Beirut
Referee: Mohammad Mansour

=== Group B ===
Team	Pld	W	D	L	GF	GA	GD	Pts
(Lebanon) Al Ahed	2	1	1	0	6	5	+1	4
(Lebanon) Nejmeh	2	1	1	0	4	3	+1	4
(Lebanon) Safa Sporting Club	2	0	0	2	4	6	−2	0

2008-08-28
17:30

Nejmeh	2 – 2	Al Ahed
Abbas Ahmed Atwi 43'; Mustapha Chahine 68'		Salih Sadir 61'; Ahmed Tarad 90+2'

Camille Chamoun Sports City Stadium, Beirut
Referee: Ali Sabbagh

2008-08-31
17:30

Al Ahed	4 – 3	Safa Sporting Club
Salih Sadir 25'; Mahmoud El Ali 57'; Abbas Ali Atwi 62'; Hassan Maatouk 90+2'		Hussein Tahan 13'; Hamze Abboud 45'; Ramez Dayoub 54' (pen.)

Camille Chamoun Sports City Stadium, Beirut
Referee: Bassam Ayad

2008-09-04
21:30

Safa Sporting Club	1 – 2	Nejmeh
Rony Azar 45'		Khaled Hamieh 63'; Abbas Ahmed Atwi 90+1' (pen.)

Saida Municipal Stadium, Sidon
Referee: Tallat Najm

== Knok-out stage ==
Semi-finals
2008-09-07 - Sidon
Al Ansar	1 (5)
Nejmeh	1 (4)
2008-09-08 - Sidon
Al Ahed	2
Shabab Al-Sahel	1

Final
2008-09-11 - Sidon
Al Ansar	1
Al Ahed	3

=== Semi finals ===
2008-09-07
21:30

Al Ansar	1 – 1 5–4 on PSO	Nejmeh
Mohamad Atwi 52'		Mustapha Chahine 85'

Saida Municipal Stadium, Sidon
Referee: Tallat Najm

2008-09-08
21:30

Al Ahed	2 – 1	Shabab Al-Sahel
Hassan Maatouk 49'; Abbas Ali Atwi 65'		Ahmad Jaradi 30'

Saida Municipal Stadium, Sidon
Referee: Mohammad Mansour

=== Final ===
2008-09-11
21:30

Al Ansar	1 – 3	Al Ahed
Mohamad Atwi 57'		Hassan Maatouk 43'; Ahmed Zreik 45+2'; Salih Sadir 69'

Saida Municipal Stadium, Sidon

== Top Scorer ==
Rank	Name	Club	Goals
1	(Iraq) Salih Sadir	Al Ahed	3
	(Lebanon) Hassan Maatouk	Al Ahed	3
3	(Lebanon) Abbas Ahmed Atwi	Nejmeh	2
	(Lebanon) Mustapha Chahine	Nejmeh	2
	(Egypt) Ahmad Jaradi	Shabab Al-Sahel	2
	(Lebanon) Abbas Ali Atwi	Al Ahed	2
	(Lebanon) Mohamad Atwi	Al-Ansar	2
