= Nour Mansour =

Lebanese footballer (born 1989)

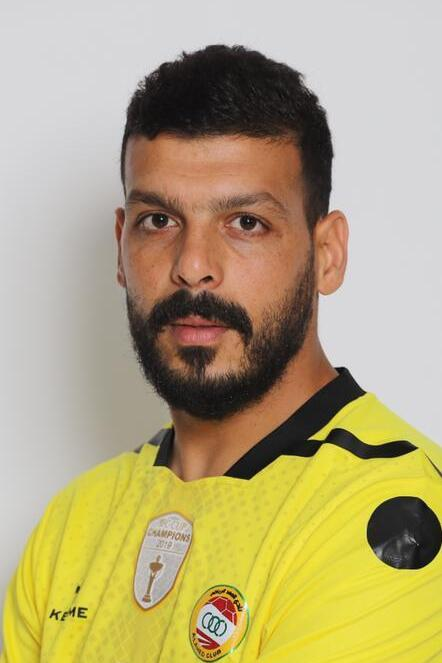
- Mansour with Ahed in 2021

Personal information
- Full name: Nour Nayef Mansour
- Date of birth: 22 October 1989 (age 37)
- Place of birth: Wadi El Nahleh, Lebanon
- Height: 1.84 m (6 ft 0 in)
- Position: Centre-back

Team information
- Current team: Tripoli
- Number: 4

Youth career
- Safa

Senior career*
Years	Team	Apps	(Gls)
2009–2016	Safa	88	(26)
2016–2026	Ahed	161	(19)
2026–	Tripoli	0	(0)

International career^{‡}
2008	Lebanon U19		
2011	Lebanon U23	2	(0)
2010–2024	Lebanon	67	(3)
- * Club domestic league appearances and goals as of 28 July 2026 ‡ National team caps and goals as of 30 January 2024

Nour Nayef Mansour (Arabic: نور نايف منصور, Lebanese Arabic pronunciation: [nuːr mɑnsˤuːr]; born 22 October 1989) is a Lebanese footballer who plays as a centre-back for Lebanese Premier League club Tripoli.

Coming through the youth system, Mansour started his career with Safa, with whom he won two league titles, one FA Cup, one Elite Cup, and one Super Cup. In 2016 he moved to reigning Lebanese Premier League champions Ahed, where he won the 2019 AFC Cup, among several domestic titles. Mansour played for Lebanon internationally between 2010 and 2024, and was part of the squads that participated in the 2019 and 2023 AFC Asian Cups.

== Club career ==
=== Safa ===
Coming through the youth system, Nour Mansour started his career with Safa, where he became the captain several years later. With Safa he won the Lebanese Premier League twice, the FA Cup once, the Elite Cup once and the Super Cup once.

=== Ahed ===
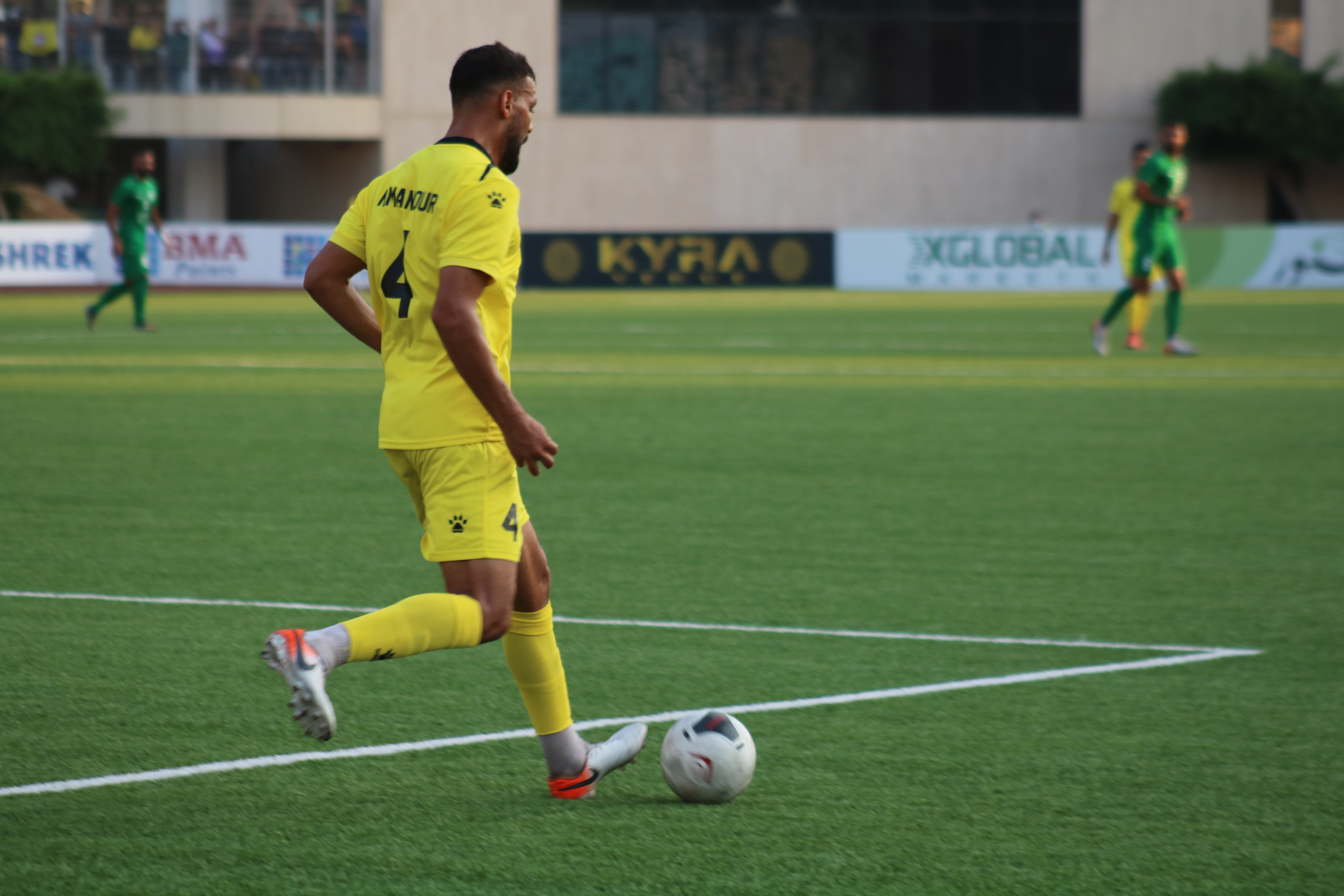
Mansour with Ahed in 2020

In 2016, he transferred to Lebanese Premier League champions Ahed for a reported $200,000 deal. Only available for the AFC Cup in the 2015–16 season, his club debut came on 23 February, when he played against Altyn Asyr. The following match, played on 8 March 2016, he scored against Al-Wehdat in a 3–2 home win in the AFC Cup.

His first league game for Ahed came on 9 September 2016 against his former club Safa, with his team winning 1–2 away. His first league goals came in the form of a brace against Racing, on 23 October 2016, in a 3–1 home win. In his second season with Ahed, he played 19 games and scored five. He also won the Lebanese Premier League, and was part of the Lebanese Premier League Team of the Season. The following season, Mansour won the domestic treble with Ahed, winning the league, FA Cup and Super Cup. He played 20 games and scored four, and was part of the Team of the Season for the second time in a row.

In the 2018–19 season, Mansour won his fifth Lebanese Premier League, the third (in a row) with Ahed, and the Lebanese Super Cup. He played a total of 15 league games. On 4 November 2019, Mansour helped Ahed win the 2019 AFC Cup, defeating April 25 in the final: this was the first time in history a Lebanese side had won the competition.

=== Tripoli ===
In August 2026, Mansour signed for newly promoted Lebanese Premier League side Tripoli on a two-year contract.

== International career ==
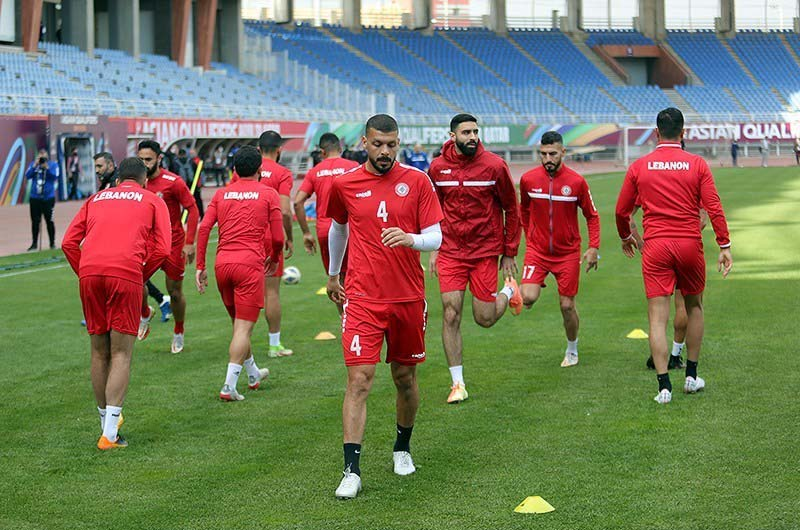
Mansour training with the Lebanon national team in 2022

Mansour made his debut for the Lebanon national team on 3 March 2010, in a 4–0 away loss against Syria. His first international goal came on 6 November 2014, against the United Arab Emirates in a 3–2 away defeat. Mansour was called up for the 2019 AFC Asian Cup squad, where he played against North Korea in the final match of the group stage, won by Lebanon 4–1.

In December 2023, Mansour was included in the Lebanese squad for the 2023 AFC Asian Cup.

== Style of play ==
Mansour is known for his tackling and reading of the game, specializing in last-second interventions. He also offers great attacking options for a defender, playing at the center of a back-three as a ball-playing centre-back. Furthermore, Mansour has an eye for goal through his aerial presence in set pieces and the occasional penalty kick.

== Career statistics ==
=== International ===
As of match played 17 January 2024

Appearances and goals by national team and year
National team	Year	Apps	Goals
Lebanon	2010	1	0
Lebanon	2011	0	0
Lebanon	2012	3	0
Lebanon	2013	11	0
Lebanon	2014	5	1
Lebanon	2015	6	0
Lebanon	2016	8	0
Lebanon	2017	6	1
Lebanon	2018	4	0
Lebanon	2019	10	0
Lebanon	2020	0	0
Lebanon	2021	7	0
Lebanon	2022	2	0
Lebanon	2023	1	1
Lebanon	2024	3	0
Total		67	3

Scores and results list Lebanon's goal tally first, score column indicates score after each Mansour goal.

List of international goals scored by Nour Mansour
No.	Date	Venue	Opponent	Score	Result	Competition	Ref.
1	6 November 2014	Prince Abdullah bin Jalawi Stadium, Al-Hasa, Saudi Arabia	United Arab Emirates	1–2	2–3	Friendly	
2	5 September 2017	Kim Il-sung Stadium, Pyongyang, North Korea	North Korea	1–1	2–2	2019 AFC Asian Cup qualification	
3	28 December 2023	Tripoli Municipal Stadium, Tripoli, Lebanon	Jordan	2–1	2–1	Friendly	

== Honours ==
Safa

- Lebanese Premier League: 2011–12, 2012–13
- Lebanese FA Cup: 2012–13
- Lebanese Elite Cup: 2012
- Lebanese Super Cup: 2013

Ahed

- Lebanese Premier League: 2016–17, 2017–18, 2018–19, 2021–22, 2022–23
- Lebanese FA Cup: 2017–18, 2018–19; runner-up: 2022–23, 2023–24
- Lebanese Federation Cup: 2023
- Lebanese Elite Cup: 2022; runner-up: 2021
- Lebanese Super Cup: 2017, 2018, 2019; runner-up: 2023
- AFC Cup: 2019; runner-up: 2023–24

Individual

- Lebanese Premier League Team of the Season: 2013–14, 2016–17, 2017–18

== See also ==
- List of Lebanon international footballers
