= Mohamad Haidar =

Lebanese footballer (born 1989)

- Haidar with Lebanon in 2024

Personal information
- Full name: Mohamad Faouzi Haidar
- Date of birth: 8 November 1989 (age 37)
- Place of birth: Tayr Debba, Lebanon
- Height: 1.78 m (5 ft 10 in)
- Positions: Winger; attacking midfielder

Team information
- Current team: Nejmeh
- Number: 10

Youth career
- 2003–2008: Tadamon Sour

Senior career*
Years	Team	Apps	(Gls)
2008–2011	Tadamon Sour		
2011–2016	Safa	60	(24)
2013–2014	→ Al-Ittihad (loan)	11	(0)
2014	→ Al-Fateh (loan)	8	(1)
2014–2015	→ Amanat Baghdad (loan)		(1)
2016–2026	Ahed	181	(31)
2026–	Nejmeh	0	(0)

International career
2007–2008	Lebanon U19		(1)
2011	Lebanon U23	2	(0)
2011–2026	Lebanon	110	(6)
- * Club domestic league appearances and goals as of 09:40, 3 August 2026 (UTC)

Mohamad Faouzi Haidar (Arabic: محمد فوزي حيدر, Lebanese Arabic pronunciation: [mˈħammad ˈfawzi ˈħajdar, -ze]; born 8 November 1989) is a Lebanese professional footballer who plays as a winger or attacking midfielder for Lebanese Premier League club Nejmeh.

Coming through the youth system, Haidar began his senior career in 2008 at hometown club Tadamon Sour, before moving to Safa in 2011. After two seasons Haidar moved abroad, first to Al-Ittihad and Al-Fateh in Saudi Arabia, then to Amanat Baghdad in Iraq. He returned to Safa in 2015, before joining Ahed the following season. Haidar left in 2026, after winning several domestic titles and the 2019 AFC Cup, and moved to Nejmeh.

Haidar represented Lebanon internationally from 2011, playing in the 2019 AFC Asian Cup, Lebanon's first participation through qualification. He also played in the 2014, 2018, and 2022 FIFA World Cup qualifiers, and 2015 and 2019 AFC Asian Cup qualifiers. He retired in 2026.

== Club career ==
=== Tadamon Sour ===
Having joined their youth system in 2003, Haidar began his senior career for hometown club Tadamon Sour in 2008 in the Lebanese Premier League.

=== Safa ===
In summer 2011, Haidar joined fellow-Lebanese Premier League side Safa in a deal worth USD$105,000. He became a key player for the team, helping them win two consecutive league titles in 2011–12 and 2012–13. Haidar also won the Lebanese Golden Ball in 2013.

In summer 2013, he moved to Saudi Arabia to play for Al-Ittihad on loan. He made his debut on 13 September 2013, helping his team defeat the league title holders Al-Fateh. In January 2014, Haidar moved to Al-Fateh on a six-month loan. In summer 2014, Haidar moved to Iraqi Premier League side Amanat Baghdad on a one-year loan.

In summer 2015, Haidar returned to Lebanon to play for Safa, and won the Lebanese Premier League 2015–16.

=== Ahed ===
Haidar (right) with Ahed against Bourj in 2020

In summer 2016, Haidar moved to Ahed on a five-year deal worth $670,000. He became the second-most expensive Lebanese player in history, after Pierre Issa's transfer to Olympic Beirut in 2002 for $1 million. On 8 September 2020, Haidar renewed his contract with Ahed for six years. He left the club on 7 August 2026, having won one AFC Cup, five league titles, two FA Cups, and three Super Cups.

=== Nejmeh ===
On 14 August 2026, Haidar joined Nejmeh.

== International career ==
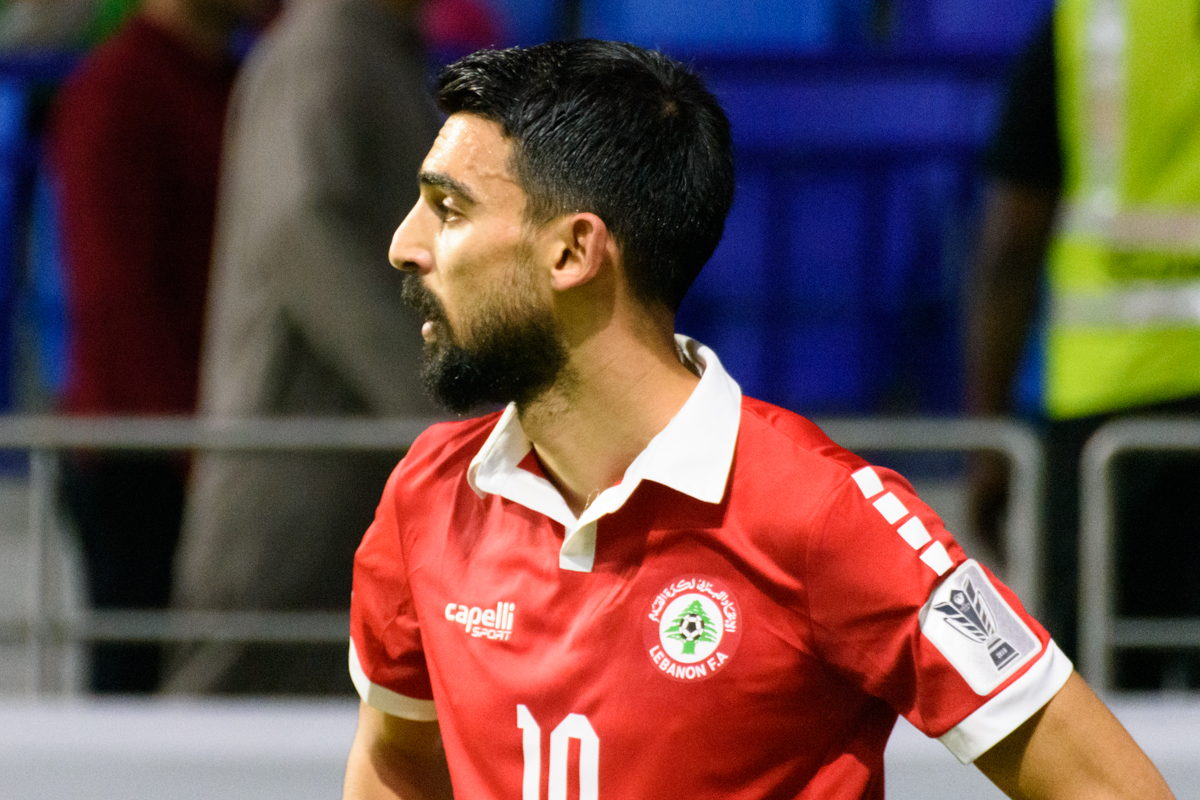
Haidar with the Lebanon national team at the 2019 AFC Asian Cup

Haidar represented Lebanon at under-19 and under-23 levels.

He made his senior debut for Lebanon on 17 August 2011, in a friendly against Syria. Haidar's first international goal came on 16 October 2012, in a friendly against Yemen; he helped his side win 2–1. In 2013, he scored twice in the 2015 AFC Asian Cup qualification, against Thailand and Iran respectively.

In December 2018, Haidar was called up for the 2019 AFC Asian Cup squad. He played in all three group stage games, against Qatar, Saudi Arabia, and North Korea. In December 2023, Khalil was included in the Lebanese squad for the 2023 AFC Asian Cup.

On 15 December 2024, Haidar featured in his 100th international match for Lebanon in a 2–0 friendly win over Kuwait.

Following Lebanon's missed qualification to the 2027 AFC Asian Cup, following a 2–0 defeat to Yemen on 4 June 2026, Haidar announced his retirement from the national team.

== Style of play ==
Initially starting out as a winger, Haidar moved to a more central role further on in his career. He is known for his dribbling and close control of the ball, as well as his set-pieces.

== Career statistics ==
=== International ===
As of match played 4 June 2026

Appearances and goals by national team and year
National team	Year	Apps	Goals
Lebanon	2011	4	0
Lebanon	2012	13	1
Lebanon	2013	13	3
Lebanon	2014	1	0
Lebanon	2015	6	0
Lebanon	2016	7	0
Lebanon	2017	6	0
Lebanon	2018	5	0
Lebanon	2019	11	0
Lebanon	2020	0	0
Lebanon	2021	13	0
Lebanon	2022	2	0
Lebanon	2023	7	1
Lebanon	2024	12	0
Lebanon	2025	9	1
Lebanon	2026	1	0
Total		110	6

Scores and results list Lebanon's goal tally first, score column indicates score after each Haidar goal.

List of international goals scored by Mohamad Haidar
No.	Date	Venue	Opponent	Score	Result	Competition
1	16 October 2012	Saida Municipal Stadium, Sidon, Lebanon	Yemen	1–1	2–1	Friendly
2	22 March 2013	Camille Chamoun Sports City Stadium, Beirut, Lebanon	Thailand	3–0	5–2	2015 AFC Asian Cup qualification
3	6 September 2013	Camille Chamoun Sports City Stadium, Beirut, Lebanon	Syria	2–0	2–0	Friendly
4	19 November 2013	Camille Chamoun Sports City Stadium, Beirut, Lebanon	Iran	1–4	1–4	2015 AFC Asian Cup qualification
5	28 December 2023	Tripoli Municipal Stadium, Tripoli, Lebanon	Jordan	1–1	2–1	Friendly
6	25 March 2025	Saoud bin Abdulrahman Stadium, Al-Wakrah, Qatar	Brunei	5–0	5–0	2027 Asian Cup qualification

== Honours ==
Safa

- Lebanese Premier League: 2011–12, 2012–13, 2015–16
- Lebanese FA Cup: 2012–13
- Lebanese Elite Cup: 2012

Ahed

- Lebanese Premier League: 2016–17, 2017–18, 2018–19, 2021–22, 2022–23
- Lebanese FA Cup: 2017–18, 2018–19; runner-up: 2022–23, 2023–24
- Lebanese Federation Cup: 2023
- Lebanese Elite Cup: 2022; runner-up: 2021
- Lebanese Super Cup: 2017, 2018, 2019; runner-up: 2023
- AFC Cup: 2019; runner-up: 2023–24

Individual

- Lebanese Premier League Best Player: 2012–13, 2015–16
- Lebanese Premier League Team of the Season: 2011–12, 2012–13, 2015–16, 2017–18
- Lebanese Premier League top scorer: 2011–12
- Lebanese Premier League top assist provider: 2015–16

== See also ==
- List of Lebanon international footballers
- List of men's footballers with 100 or more international caps
