= Hamza Abboud =

Lebanese footballer (born 1984)

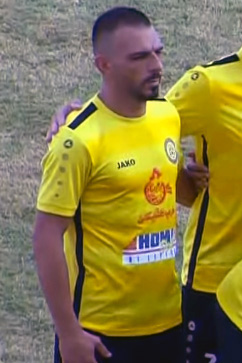
- Abboud with Bourj in 2019

Personal information
- Full name: Hamza Mustafa Abboud
- Date of birth: 1 November 1984 (age 42)
- Place of birth: Deir Aames, Lebanon
- Height: 1.72 m (5 ft 8 in)
- Position: Right-back

Senior career*
Years	Team	Apps	(Gls)
2008–2013	Safa		(2)
2013–2017	Ansar	72	(2)
2017–2018	Nejmeh	0	(0)
2017–2018	→ Nabi Chit (loan)	9	(0)
2018–2019	Bekaa	19	(0)
2019–2022	Bourj	18	(0)
2022–2023	Akhaa Ahli Aley	21	(0)
2023–2024	Shabab Baalbek	15	(0)

International career
2009–2011	Lebanon	10	(0)
- * Club domestic league appearances and goals

Hamza Mustafa Abboud (Arabic: حمزة مصطفى عبود; born 1 November 1984) is a Lebanese former footballer who played as a right-back.

Abboud played for Safa between 2008 and 2013, winning two league titles, one FA Cup, and two Elite Cups, as well as finishing runner-up in the 2008 AFC Cup. In 2013 he moved to Ansar, where he won an FA Cup, before joining Nejmeh in 2017, who sent him on loan to Nabi Chit. After one season on loan, Abboud stayed another season at Nabi Chit, who changed their name to Bekaa, before moving to Bourj in 2019. He joined Akhaa Ahli Aley in 2022 and Shabab Baalbeck in 2023.

Abboud also represented Lebanon internationally between 2009 and 2011, playing 10 games.

== Club career ==
Abboud began his senior career at Safa during the 2008–09 Lebanese Premier League. He scored in the 2008 AFC Cup semi-final against Dempo, helping his side reach the final. Safa lost the final 10–5 on aggregate to Al-Muharraq, and finished as runners-up of the tournament. In 2009, Abboud helped Safa win their first Lebanese Elite Cup, before winning it again in 2012. Abboud also won Safa's first two Lebanese Premier Leagues, in 2011–12 and 2012–13, as well as a Lebanese FA Cup, in 2012–13.

On 23 August 2013, Abboud officially moved to Ansar, after negotiations that lasted nearly 45 days. Abboud stayed for four seasons, between 2013–14 and 2016–17, winning a Lebanese FA Cup in the latter season. In 2017, Abboud moved to Nejmeh, who subsequently moved him on loan to Nabi Chit. The following season, Nabi Chit changed their name to Bekaa, and bought Abboud from Nejmeh on a permanent basis. On 18 May 2019, Bourj officially announced the signing of Abboud. He moved to Akhaa Ahli Aley on 6 July 2022.

On 11 July 2023, Abboud joined Shabab Baalbeck in the Lebanese Second Division.

== International career ==
Abboud made his senior international debut for Lebanon on 19 August 2008, in a friendly against India. Lebanon won 1–0 away from home. Abboud played 10 games between 2009 and 2011, with his last matches being the 2014 FIFA World Cup qualifying matches against Bangladesh, which Lebanon won 4–2 on aggregate.

== Honours ==
Safa

- Lebanese Premier League: 2011–12, 2012–13
- Lebanese FA Cup: 2012–13
- Lebanese Elite Cup: 2009, 2012
- AFC Cup runner-up: 2008

Ansar

- Lebanese FA Cup: 2016–17

Akhaa Ahli Aley

- Lebanese Challenge Cup: 2022

Individual

- Lebanese Premier League most appearances: 2009–10
