= 2008 AFC Cup =

5th secondary club football tournament organized by the

Tournament details
- Dates: 11 March–7 November 2008
- Teams: 20 (from 10 associations)

Final positions
- Champions: (Bahrain) Al-Muharraq (1st title)
- Runners-up: (Lebanon) Safa

Tournament statistics
- Matches played: 74
- Goals scored: 235 (3.18 per match)
- Top scorer: (Brazil) Rico (19 goals)
- Best player: (Bahrain) Mahmood Abdulrahman

The 2008 AFC Cup was the fifth edition of the AFC Cup, played amongst clubs from nations of the AFC, who are considered to be 'developing countries' as per the 'Vision Asia' members paper of AFC President Mohamed Bin Hammam.

Al-Muharraq defeated Safa 10–5 on aggregate in the final, with Brazilian striker Rico scoring six of the clubs ten goals over the two legs. This marked the first time a club from Bahrain won an AFC Club competition. Both finalists initially qualified for the qualifying play-off round in the 2009 AFC Champions League, but were later demoted to the 2009 AFC Cup as neither clubs leagues met the AFC's Champions League criteria.

Shabab Al-Ordon were the defending champions, but were eliminated in the group stage of the competition.

== Qualified teams ==
The league champions and cup winners from the thirteen 'developing' (as determined by the AFC) were eligible to participate in the competition. As Indonesian clubs withdrew from the 2008 AFC Champions League, the following changes were made:

- The second ranked teams from Thailand (Krung Thai Bank) and Vietnam (Nam Định) were reassigned from the AFC Cup to the AFC Champions League.
- Turkmenistan were excluded from the competition, as its clubs would now participate in the AFC President's Cup.
- Clubs from India would participate in the West Asian zone.

West Asia			East Asia		
Team	Qualifying method	App (Last)	Team	Qualifying method	App (Last)
(Bahrain) Al-Muharraq	2006–07 Bahraini Premier League champions	3rd (2007)	(Hong Kong) South China	2006–07 Hong Kong First Division League champions	1st
(Bahrain) Al-Najma	2007 Bahraini King's Cup winners	1st	(Hong Kong) Kitchee	2006–07 Hong Kong First Division League runners-up	1st
(India) Dempo	2006–07 Indian National Football League champions	3rd (2006)	(Maldives) New Radiant	2007 Dhivehi League champions	4th (2007)
(India) East Bengal	2007 Indian Federation Cup winners	2nd (2006)	(Maldives) Victory SC	2007 Maldives FA Cup winners	2nd (2007)
(Jordan) Al-Wahdat	2006–07 Jordan League champions	2nd (2007)	(Malaysia) Kedah	2006–07 Malaysia Super League champions	1st
(Jordan) Shabab Al-Ordon^{TH}	2006–07 Jordan FA Cup winners	2nd (2007)	(Malaysia) Perak	2006–07 Malaysia Super League runners-up	3rd (2005)
(Lebanon) Al-Ansar	2006–07 Lebanese Premier League champions	1st	Singapore Armed Forces	2007 S.League champions	2nd (2007)
(Lebanon) Safa	2006–07 Lebanese Premier League runners-up	1st	(Singapore) Home United	2007 S.League runners-up	4th (2006)
(Oman) Al-Nahda	2006–07 Omani League champions	1st			
(Oman) Sur	2007 Sultan Qaboos Cup winners	1st			
(Yemen) Ahli Sanaa Club	2007 Yemeni League champions	1st			
(Yemen) Al-Sha'ab Hadramaut	2006 Yemeni President Cup winners	1st			

=== Notes ===
1. Hong Kong (HKG): As the 2006–07 Hong Kong Senior Shield winners South China qualified for the AFC Cup via their league position, the spot reserved for the Hong Kong Senior Shield winners was transferred to the second placed team in the 2006–07 Hong Kong First Division League.
2. Lebanon (LBN): As the 2006–07 Lebanese FA Cup winners Al-Ansar qualified for the AFC Cup via their league position, the spot reserved for the Lebanese FA Cup winners was transferred to the second placed team in the 2006–07 Lebanese Premier League.
3. Malaysia (MAS): As the 2007 Malaysia FA Cup winners Keda qualified for the AFC Cup via their league position, the spot reserved for the Malaysia FA Cup winners was transferred to the second placed team in the 2006–07 Malaysia Super League.
4. Singapore (SGP): As the 2007 Singapore Cup winners Singapore Armed Forces qualified for the AFC Cup via their league position, the spot reserved for the Singapore Cup winners was transferred to the second placed team in the 2007 S.League.

== Schedule ==
Stage	Round	Draw date	First leg	Second leg
Group stage	Matchday 1	17 October 2007	11 March 2008	
Group stage	Matchday 2	17 October 2007	18 March 2008	
Group stage	Matchday 3	17 October 2007	3 April 2008	
Group stage	Matchday 4	17 October 2007	16 April 2008	
Group stage	Matchday 5	17 October 2007	30 April 2008	
Group stage	Matchday 6	17 October 2007	14–21 May 2008	
Knockout stage	Quarter-finals	24 May 2008	16 September 2008	23 September 2008
Knockout stage	Semi-finals	24 May 2008	7 October 2008	21 October 2008
Knockout stage	Final	24 May 2008	31 October 2008	7 November 2008

== Group stage ==
=== Group A ===
Pos	Team	Pld	W	D	L	GF	GA	GD	Pts	Qualification
1	(Bahrain) Al-Muharraq	6	3	2	1	14	7	+7	11	Advance to Knockout stage
2	(India) Dempo	6	3	1	2	13	12	+1	10	Advance to Knockout stage
3	(Lebanon) Al-Ansar	6	2	2	2	6	8	−2	8	
4	(Oman) Sur	6	1	1	4	9	15	−6	4	

11 March 2008
16:00 UTC+5:30

Dempo (India)	3–1	(Lebanon) Al-Ansar
Soleye 21', 32'; Edeh 62'	(Report) (Report)	Danach 89'

Pandit Jawaharlal Nehru Stadium, Goa
Attendance: 6,000
Referee: Ng Chiu Kok (Hong Kong)
11 March 2008
18:15 UTC+3

Al-Muharraq (Bahrain)	3–2	(Oman) Sur
Rico 24' (pen.); John 45+2'; Al-Dakeel 83'	(Report) (Report)	Al-Gheilani 35'; José 39'

Bahrain National Stadium, Manama
Attendance: 2,500
Referee: Masaaki Iemoto (Japan)

18 March 2008
18:00 UTC+3

Al-Ansar (Lebanon)	0–0	(Bahrain) Al-Muharraq
	(Report) (Report)

Sports City Stadium, Beirut
Attendance: 3,000
Referee: Mukhtar Al Yarimi (Yemen)
18 March 2008
19:00 UTC+3

Sur (Oman)	3–2	(India) Dempo
Traore 9'; Camara 69'; Lawrence 80' (o.g.)	(Report) (Report)	Soleye 26'; Silva 62'

Nizwa Sports Complex, Nizwa
Attendance: 1,500
Referee: Ali Saleem (Maldives)

3 April 2008
18:00 UTC+3

Al-Ansar (Lebanon)	1–0	(Oman) Sur
Sadir 28'	(Report) (Report)

Sports City Stadium, Beirut
Attendance: 4,000
Referee: Abdullah Balideh (Qatar)
3 April 2008
16:00 UTC+5:30

Dempo (India)	0–4	(Bahrain) Al-Muharraq
	(Report) (Report)	Rico 8', 31', 49' (pen.), 59'

Pandit Jawaharlal Nehru Stadium, Goa
Attendance: 5,000
Referee: Vo Minh Tri (Vietnam)

16 April 2008
19:15 UTC+3

Sur (Oman)	0–2	(Lebanon) Al-Ansar
	(Report) (Report)	Sadir 77', 88'

Nizwa Sports Complex, Nizwa
Attendance: 400
Referee: Mohamed Omar Al-Saeedi (United Arab Emirates)
16 April 2008
18:30 UTC+3

Al-Muharraq (Bahrain)	1–2	(India) Dempo
Rico 77' (pen.)	(Report) (Report)	Soleye 10', 62'

Bahrain National Stadium, Manama
Attendance: 2,000
Referee: Salem Mujghef (Jordan)

30 April 2008
18:00 UTC+3

Al-Ansar (Lebanon)	1–1	(India) Dempo
Hamoud 84'	(Report) (Report)	Soleye 27'

Sports City Stadium, Beirut
Attendance: 1,950
Referee: Tan Hai (China)
30 April 2008
19:15 UTC+3

Sur (Oman)	2–2	(Bahrain) Al-Muharraq
José 48', 62'	(Report) (Report)	Rico 45+1'; Okwunwanne 55'

Nizwa Sports Complex, Nizwa
Attendance: 300
Referee: Choi Myung-Yong (South Korea)

14 May 2008
16:00 UTC+5:30

Dempo (India)	5–2	(Oman) Sur
Soleye 30', 38'; Edeh 64', 90'; Lawrence 72'	(Report) (Report)	Al-Sinani 75'; Al-Harbi 86'

Pandit Jawaharlal Nehru Stadium, Goa
Attendance: 4,000
Referee: Peter Green (Australia)
21 May 2008
18:45 UTC+3

Al-Muharraq (Bahrain)	4–1	(Lebanon) Al-Ansar
Abdulrahman 30'; Rico 51', 66'; Okwunwanne 57'	(Report)	Hassoun 44'

Bahrain National Stadium, Manama
Attendance: 2,000
Referee: Rustam Saidov (Uzbekistan)

=== Group B ===
Pos	Team	Pld	W	D	L	GF	GA	GD	Pts	Qualification
1	(Lebanon) Safa	6	2	4	0	8	6	+2	10	Advance to Knockout stage
2	(Jordan) Al-Wahdat	6	1	4	1	12	12	0	7	
3	(India) East Bengal	6	2	1	3	5	6	−1	7	
4	(Yemen) Ahli Sanaa Club	6	1	3	2	3	4	−1	6	

Source: RSSSF
11 March 2008
16:15 UTC+3

Ahli Sanaa Club (Yemen)	1–1	(Jordan) Al-Wahdat
Al-Salemi 28'	(Report) (Report)	Fattah 40' (pen.)

Ali Mohsen Al-Muraisi Stadium, Sanaa
Attendance: 13,000
Referee: Hettikamkanamge Perera (Sri Lanka)
11 March 2008
18:00 UTC+3

Safa (Lebanon)	1–0	(India) East Bengal
Mbassi 17'	(Report) (Report)

Sports City Stadium, Beirut
Attendance: 700
Referee: Mahmood Mohd Juma Al Ghatrifi (Oman)

18 March 2008
15:00 UTC+3

Al-Wahdat (Jordan)	3–3	(Lebanon) Safa
Shelbaieh 51'; Fattah 86'; Fat'hi 90+5'	(Report) (Report)	Prince Bobby 16'; Dayoub 31'; Azar 83'

Prince Mohammad International Stadium, Amman
Attendance: 1,000
Referee: Mohamed Omar Al-Saeedi (United Arab Emirates)
18 March 2008
15:00 UTC+5:30

East Bengal (India)	1–0	(Yemen) Ahli Sanaa Club
Edmilson 31'	(Report) (Report)

Salt Lake Stadium, Kolkata
Attendance: 6,000
Referee: Minoru Tōjō (Japan)

3 April 2008
15:30 UTC+3

Al-Wahdat (Jordan)	0–2	(India) East Bengal
	(Report) (Report)	D'Cunha 58'; Ibe 69'

Prince Mohammad International Stadium, Amman
Attendance: 4,000
Referee: Rosdi Shaharul (Malaysia)
3 April 2008
16:15 UTC+3

Ahli Sanaa Club (Yemen)	0–0	(Lebanon) Safa
	(Report) (Report)

Ali Mohsen Al-Muraisi Stadium, Sanaa
Attendance: 4,000
Referee: Chaiya Alee Mahapab (Thailand)

16 April 2008
15:00 UTC+5:30

East Bengal (India)	2–4	(Jordan) Al-Wahdat
Nabi 12'; Edmilson 28'	(Report) (Report)	Ra'fat Ali 6', 24'; Fattah 31', 34'

Salt Lake Stadium, Kolkata
Attendance: 10,000
Referee: Vo Minh Tri (Vietnam)
16 April 2008
18:00 UTC+3

Safa (Lebanon)	1–0	(Yemen) Ahli Sanaa Club
Abboud 64'	(Report) (Report)

Sports City Stadium, Beirut
Attendance: 1,000
Referee: Tayeb Hasan Shamsuzzaman (Bangladesh)

30 April 2008
15:30 UTC+3

Al-Wahdat (Jordan)	1–1	(Yemen) Ahli Sanaa Club
Fattah 30'	(Report)	Al-Nono 80'

Prince Mohammad International Stadium, Amman
Attendance: 1,500
Referee: Ali Saleem (Maldives)
30 April 2008
15:00 UTC+5:30

East Bengal (India)	0–0	(Lebanon) Safa
	(Report)

Salt Lake Stadium, Kolkata
Attendance: 10,000
Referee: Valentin Kovalenko (Uzbekistan)

14 May 2008
16:15 UTC+3

Ahli Sanaa Club (Yemen)	1–0	(India) East Bengal
Al-Nono 43'	(Report)

Ali Mohsen Al-Muraisi Stadium, Sanaa
Attendance: 1,000
Referee: Dilovarshokh Orzuev (Tajikistan)
21 May 2008
18:00 UTC+3

Safa (Lebanon)	3–3	(Jordan) Al-Wahdat
Azar 6'; Tahan 80'; Amer Khan 90+5'	(Report)	Ra'fat Ali 18', 63'; Fadi Faris 72'

Sports City Stadium, Beirut
Attendance: 200
Referee: Abdulrahman Abdou (Qatar)

=== Group C ===
Pos	Team	Pld	W	D	L	GF	GA	GD	Pts	Qualification
1	(Oman) Al-Nahda	6	2	3	1	9	8	+1	9	Advance to Knockout stage
2	(Jordan) Shabab Al-Ordon	6	1	4	1	7	7	0	7	
3	(Bahrain) Al-Najma	6	1	4	1	7	7	0	7	
4	(Yemen) Al-Sha'ab Hadramaut	6	1	3	2	7	8	−1	6	

11 March 2008
19:00 UTC+3

Al-Nahda (Oman)	0–0	(Bahrain) Al-Najma
	(Report) (Report)

Nizwa Sports Complex, Nizwa
Attendance: 350
Referee: Dilovarshokh Orzuev (Tajikistan)
11 March 2008
15:00 UTC+3

Shabab Al-Ordon (Jordan)	1–1	(Yemen) Al-Sha'ab Hadramaut
Al-Saify 51'	(Report) (Report)	Mahadi 38'

Prince Mohammad International Stadium, Amman
Attendance: 150
Referee: Tan Hai (China)

18 March 2008
18:48 UTC+3

Al-Najma (Bahrain)	0–0	(Jordan) Shabab Al-Ordon
	(Report) (Report)

Al-Ahli Stadium, Manama
Attendance: 500
Referee: Hedayat Mombeni (Iran)
18 March 2008
16:15 UTC+3

Al-Sha'ab Hadramaut (Yemen)	3–1	(Oman) Al-Nahda
Ba-Haj 44', 45+1'; Al-Nohi 51'	(Report) (Report)	Yedibahoma 52'

Ali Mohsen Al-Muraisi Stadium, Sanaa
Attendance: 4,000
Referee: Rosdi Shaharul (Malaysia)

3 April 2008
18:55 UTC+3

Al-Najma (Bahrain)	2–1	(Yemen) Al-Sha'ab Hadramaut
Salem 8'; Ba-Karman 54' (o.g.)	(Report) (Report)	Aly 67'

Bahrain National Stadium, Manama
Attendance: 350
Referee: Hettikamkanamge Perera (Sri Lanka)
3 April 2008
19:00 UTC+3

Al-Nahda (Oman)	1–1	(Jordan) Shabab Al-Ordon
Al-Shamsi 26'	(Report) (Report)	Shehdeh 70'

Nizwa Sports Complex, Nizwa
Attendance: 500
Referee: Atallah Jatli Al-Enezi (Kuwait)

16 April 2008
16:15 UTC+3

Al-Sha'ab Hadramaut (Yemen)	0–0	(Bahrain) Al-Najma
	(Report) (Report)

Ali Mohsen Al-Muraisi Stadium, Sanaa
Attendance: 3,000
Referee: Win Cho (Myanmar)
16 April 2008
15:30 UTC+3

Shabab Al-Ordon (Jordan)	0–1	(Oman) Al-Nahda
	(Report) (Report)	Yedibahoma 57'

Prince Mohammad International Stadium, Amman
Attendance: 100
Referee: Ali Saleem (Maldives)

30 April 2008
19:09 UTC+3

Al-Najma (Bahrain)	3–3	(Oman) Al-Nahda
Salem 53', 67', 77'	(Report) (Report)	Yedibahoma 6', 50'; Al-Alawi 38'

Bahrain National Stadium, Manama
Attendance: 200
Referee: Abdulrahman Abdou (Qatar)
30 April 2008
16:15 UTC+3

Al-Sha'ab Hadramaut (Yemen)	2–2	(Jordan) Shabab Al-Ordon
Al-Arumi 5'; Mahadi 88' (pen.)	(Report) (Report)	Shehdeh 3'; Maharmeh 45'

Ali Mohsen Al-Muraisi Stadium, Sanaa
Attendance: 4,000
Referee: Fareed Ali Mohamed Al Marzouqi (United Arab Emirates)

14 May 2008
19:00 UTC+3

Al-Nahda (Oman)	2–0	(Yemen) Al-Sha'ab Hadramaut
Al-Nuaimi 14'; Al-Mashaikhi 43'	(Report) (Report)

Nizwa Sports Complex, Nizwa
Attendance: 300
Referee: Khalil Ibrahim Al Ghamdi (Saudi Arabia)
14 May 2008
15:30 UTC+3

Shabab Al-Ordon (Jordan)	3–2	(Bahrain) Al-Najma
Al-Saify 9'; Shehdeh 28'; Touk 40' (pen.)	(Report) (Report)	Salem 51' (pen.) 69'

Prince Mohammad International Stadium, Amman
Attendance: 100
Referee: Minoru Tōjō (Japan)

=== Group D ===
Pos	Team	Pld	W	D	L	GF	GA	GD	Pts	Qualification
1	(Singapore) Home United	6	5	0	1	18	10	+8	15	Advance to Knockout stage
2	(Malaysia) Kedah	6	4	1	1	13	8	+5	13	Advance to Knockout stage
3	(Hong Kong) South China	6	1	1	4	7	13	−6	4	
4	(Maldives) Victory	6	0	2	4	3	10	−7	2	

11 March 2008
20:00 UTC+8

South China (Hong Kong)	2–3	(Singapore) Home United
Cheng Siu Wai 60', 90'	(AFC Report) (AFC Report) (HKFA Report)	Oliveira 17', 40'; Shi 77'

Mong Kok Stadium, Hong Kong
Attendance: 4,673
Referee: Win Cho (Maldives)
11 March 2008
20:45 UTC+8

Kedah (Malaysia)	1–0	(Maldives) Victory
Bakhtiar 49'	(Report) (Report)

Darul Aman Stadium, Alor Setar
Attendance: 12,000
Referee: Naser Al-Ghafary (Jordan)

18 March 2008
19:45 UTC+8

Home United (Singapore)	5–1	(Malaysia) Kedah
Ludovick 31', 58'; Shahril 36'; Oliveira 70', 81' (pen.)	(Report) (Report)	Shafiq 12'

Jalan Besar Stadium, Singapore
Attendance: 2,693
Referee: Peter Green (Australia)
18 March 2008
16:00 UTC+5

Victory (Maldives)	0–0	(Hong Kong) South China
	(Report) (Report)

Maldives National Stadium, Malé
Attendance: 6,500
Referee: Valentin Kovalenko (Uzbekistan)

3 April 2008
19:45 UTC+8

Home United (Singapore)	2–1	(Maldives) Victory
Indra 37'; Oliveira 50'	(Report) (Report)	Ashad Ali 25'

Jalan Besar Stadium, Singapore
Attendance: 1,223
Referee: Mukhtar Al Yarimi (Yemen)
3 April 2008
20:00 UTC+8

South China (Hong Kong)	1–3	(Malaysia) Kedah
Cris 59'	(AFC Report) (AFC Report) (HKFA Report)	Bakhtiar 31'; James 65'; Samransak 85'

Mong Kok Stadium, Hong Kong
Attendance: 1,055
Referee: Minoru Tōjō (Japan)

16 April 2008
16:00 UTC+5

Victory (Maldives)	1–3	(Singapore) Home United
Mohamed 69'	(Report) (Report)	Ishak 56'; Indra 66'; Oliveira 73'

Maldives National Stadium, Malé
Attendance: 6,000
Referee: Abdulrahman Abdou (Qatar)
16 April 2008
20:45 UTC+8

Kedah (Malaysia)	3–0	(Hong Kong) South China
James 55'; San Martín 70', 85'	(Report) (Report)

Darul Aman Stadium, Alor Setar
Attendance: 6,000
Referee: Mukhtar Al Yarimi (Yemen)

30 April 2008
19:45 UTC+8

Home United (Singapore)	4–1	(Hong Kong) South China
Ishak 30', 88'; Indra 75'; Farook 87'	(Report) (Report)	Cheng Siu Wai 80'

Jalan Besar Stadium, Singapore
Attendance: 1,175
Referee: Chaiya Alee Mahapab (Thailand)
30 April 2008
16:00 UTC+5

Victory (Maldives)	1–1	(Malaysia) Kedah
Arguello 8'	(Report) (Report)	James 65'

Maldives National Stadium, Malé
Attendance: 4,500
Referee: Tayeb Hasan Shamsuzzaman (Bangladesh)

14 May 2008
20:00 UTC+8

South China (Hong Kong)	3–0	(Maldives) Victory
Schütz 27'; Cris 43', 68'	(Report) (Report)

Mong Kok Stadium, Hong Kong
Attendance: 429
Referee: Kim Dong-Jin (South Korea)
14 May 2008
20:45 UTC+8

Kedah (Malaysia)	4–1	(Singapore) Home United
San Martín 41', 59' (pen.); Sabree 46'; James 83'	(Report) (Report)	Ludovick 5'

Darul Aman Stadium, Alor Setar
Attendance: 10,000
Referee: Valentin Kovalenko (Uzbekistan)

=== Group E ===
Pos	Team	Pld	W	D	L	GF	GA	GD	Pts	Qualification
1	Singapore Armed Forces	6	4	1	1	16	4	+12	13	Advance to Knockout stage
2	(Malaysia) Perak	6	4	1	1	13	10	+3	13	Advance to Knockout stage
3	(Hong Kong) Kitchee	6	1	1	4	6	12	−6	4	
4	(Maldives) New Radiant	6	1	1	4	4	13	−9	4	

11 March 2008
15:45 UTC+5

New Radiant (Maldives)	1–3	(Malaysia) Perak
Mbock 8'	(Report) (Report)	Cáceres 9', 17'; Jamlus 38'

Maldives National Stadium, Malé
Attendance: 8,000
Referee: Chaiya Alee Mahapab (Thailand)
11 March 2008
19:45 UTC+8

Singapore Armed Forces	4–0	(Hong Kong) Kitchee
Ali 12'; Chaiman 25'; Duric 37'; Zhenpeng 51' (o.g.)	(Report) (Report)

Jalan Besar Stadium, Singapore
Attendance: 2,543
Referee: Vo Minh Tri (Vietnam)

18 March 2008
20:45 UTC+8

Perak (Malaysia)	1–6	Singapore Armed Forces
Berrios 45+2' (pen.)	(Report) (Report)	Chaiman 8'; Duric 45', 49', 71', 74'; Manzur 58'

Perak Stadium, Ipoh
Attendance: 5,000
Referee: Choi Myung Yong (South Korea)
18 March 2008
20:00 UTC+8

Kitchee (Hong Kong)	2–0	(Maldives) New Radiant
Bamnjo 11'; Stankovski 36'	(AFC Report) (AFC Report) (HKFA Report)

Mong Kok Stadium, Hong Kong
Attendance: 1,372
Referee: Mahmood Mohd Juma Al-Ghatrifi (Oman)

3 April 2008
20:45 UTC+8

Perak (Malaysia)	2–1	(Hong Kong) Kitchee
Jaafar 11'; Berrios 90+2'	(Report) (Report)	Stankovski 73'

Perak Stadium, Ipoh
Attendance: 1,000
Referee: Peter Green (Australia)
3 April 2008
15:30 UTC+5

New Radiant (Maldives)	0–3	Singapore Armed Forces
	(Report) (Report)	Shariff 7'; Duric 44'; Hamid 86' (o.g.)

Maldives National Stadium, Malé
Attendance: 4,000
Referee: Mohamad Mansour (Lebanon)

16 April 2008
20:00 UTC+8

Kitchee (Hong Kong)	2–2	(Malaysia) Perak
Ip Chung Long 50'; Bamnjo 84'	(Report) (Report)	Caceres 17', 79'

Mong Kok Stadium, Hong Kong
Attendance: 1,138
Referee: Valentin Kovalenko (Uzbekistan)
16 April 2008
19:45 UTC+8

Singapore Armed Forces	1–1	(Maldives) New Radiant
Wilkinson 27'	(Report) (Report)	Gani 50'

Jalan Besar Stadium, Singapore
Attendance: 1,505
Referee: Kadhum Auda Lazim (Iraq)

30 April 2008
20:45 UTC+8

Perak (Malaysia)	3–0	(Maldives) New Radiant
Muñoz 33', 65'; Kandasamy 90+1'	(Report) (Report)

Perak Stadium, Ipoh
Attendance: 700
Referee: Dilovarshokh Orzuev (Tajikistan)
30 April 2008
20:00 UTC+8

Kitchee (Hong Kong)	0–2	Singapore Armed Forces
	(Report) (Report)	Shariff 10'; Duric 19'

Mong Kok Stadium, Hong Kong
Attendance: 813
Referee: Hettikamkanamge Perera (Sri Lanka)

14 May 2008
15:45 UTC+5

New Radiant (Maldives)	2–1	(Hong Kong) Kitchee
Simaz 62', 66'	(Report) (Report)	Nishan 45+1' (o.g.)

Maldives National Stadium, Malé
Attendance: 2,000
Referee: Win Cho (Myanmar)
14 May 2008
19:45 UTC+8

Singapore Armed Forces	0–2	(Malaysia) Perak
	(Report) (Report)	Azhar 21'; Jaafar 69'

Jalan Besar Stadium, Singapore
Attendance: 2,297
Referee: Hiroyoshi Takayama (Japan)

=== Ranking of second-placed teams ===
Pos	Team	Pld	W	D	L	GF	GA	GD	Pts	Qualification
1	(Malaysia) Kedah	6	4	1	1	13	8	+5	13	Advance to Knockout stage
2	(Malaysia) Perak	6	4	1	1	13	10	+3	13	Advance to Knockout stage
3	(India) Dempo	6	3	1	2	13	12	+1	10	Advance to Knockout stage
4	(Jordan) Al-Wahdat	6	1	4	1	12	12	0	7	
5	(Jordan) Shabab Al-Ordon	6	1	4	1	7	7	0	7	

== Knockout stage ==
=== Bracket ===
Quarter-finals
(Bahrain) Al-Muharraq	5	2	7
(Malaysia) Kedah	0	1	1
Singapore Armed Forces	2	0	2
(Oman) Al-Nahda	1	3	4
(Malaysia) Perak	0	0	0
(Lebanon) Safa	2	5	7
(India) Dempo	1	4	5
(Singapore) Home United	1	3	4

Semi-finals
(Bahrain) Al-Muharraq (a)	0	2	2
(Oman) Al-Nahda	1	1	2
(Lebanon) Safa	1	4	5
(India) Dempo	0	1	1

Final
(Bahrain) Al-Muharraq	5	5	10
(Lebanon) Safa	1	4	5

=== Quarter-finals ===
The first legs were played on 16 September, and the second legs were played on 23 September 2008.

Team 1	Agg.	Team 2	1st leg	2nd leg
Perak (Malaysia)	0–7	(Lebanon) Safa	0–2	0–5
Singapore Armed Forces	2–4	(Oman) Al-Nahda	2-1	0-3
Dempo (India)	5–4	(Singapore) Home United	1–1	4–3
Al-Muharraq (Bahrain)	7–1	(Malaysia) Kedah	5–0	2–1

==== Matches ====
16 September 2008

Perak (Malaysia)	0–2	(Lebanon) Safa
	Report	Azar 38'; Termina 55'

Perak Stadium, Ipoh
Attendance: 1,000
Referee: Satop Tongkhan (Thailand)
23 September 2008

Safa (Lebanon)	5–0	(Malaysia) Perak
Azar 43', 45'; Tahan 61'; Kassas 68'; Al-Zoughbi 84'	Report

Sports City Stadium, Beirut
Attendance: 300
Referee: Abdulrahman Abdou (Qatar)

Safa won 7–0 on aggregate.

16 September 2008

Singapore Armed Forces	2–1	(Oman) Al-Nahda
Duric 41', 66'	Report	Yedibahoma 85'

Jalan Besar Stadium, Singapore
Attendance: 1,600
Referee: Hiroyoshi Takayama (Japan)
23 September 2008

Al-Nahda (Oman)	3–0	Singapore Armed Forces
Al-Nuaimi 28'; Yedibahoma 63', 90'	Report

Nizwa Sports Complex, Nizwa
Attendance: 400
Referee: Mohamad Mansour (Lebanon)

Al-Nahda won 4–2 on aggregate.

16 September 2008

Dempo (India)	1–1	(Singapore) Home United
Iyomi 78'	Report	Sulaiman 37'

Gachibowli Athletic Stadium, Hyderabad
Attendance: 180
Referee: Abdullah Al Hilali (Oman)
23 September 2008

Home United (Singapore)	3–4	(India) Dempo
Oliviera 13'; Sahdan 36', 38'	Report	Iyomi 1'; Beto 23', 83'; Lawrence 45'

Jalan Besar Stadium, Singapore
Attendance: 1,341
Referee: Fareed Ali Mohamed Al Marzouqi (United Arab Emirates)

Dempo won 5–4 on aggregate.

16 September 2008

Al-Muharraq (Bahrain)	5–0	(Malaysia) Kedah
Salmeen 65'; Abdulrahman 73', 90+2'; Rico 85'; Al-Hardan 87'	Report

Bahrain National Stadium, Manama
Attendance: 1,200
Referee: Kim Dong-Jin (South Korea)
23 September 2008

Kedah (Malaysia)	1–2	(Bahrain) Al-Muharraq
Bakhtiar 69'	Report	Rico 29', 39'

Darul Aman Stadium, Alor Setar
Attendance: 2,000
Referee: Ali Hamad Al-Badwawi (United Arab Emirates)

Al-Muharraq won 7–1 on aggregate.

=== Semi-finals ===
The first legs were played on 7 October, and the second legs were played on 21 October 2008.

Team 1	Agg.	Team 2	1st leg	2nd leg
Al-Muharraq (Bahrain)	2–2 (a)	(Oman) Al-Nahda	0–1	2–1
Safa (Lebanon)	5–1	(India) Dempo	1–0	4–1

==== Matches ====
7 October 2008

Al-Muharraq (Bahrain)	0–1	(Oman) Al-Nahda
	Report	Al-Alawi 9'

Bahrain National Stadium, Manama
Attendance: 3,500
Referee: Masoud Moradi (Iran)
21 October 2008

Al-Nahda (Oman)	1–2	(Bahrain) Al-Muharraq
Al-Farazi 70'	Report	Rico 38'; Abdulrahman 63'

Nizwa Sports Complex, Nizwa
Attendance: 4,500
Referee: Ravshan Irmatov (Uzbekistan)

2–2 on aggregate. Al-Muharraq won on away goals.

7 October 2008

Safa (Lebanon)	1–0	(India) Dempo
Aboud 90'	Report

Sports City Stadium, Beirut
Attendance: 500
Referee: Lee Gi-Young (South Korea)
21 October 2008

Dempo (India)	1–4	(Lebanon) Safa
Iyomi 30'	Report	Kassas 9', 19'; Tahan 89', 90+4'

Gachibowli Athletic Stadium, Hyderabad
Attendance: 500
Referee: Yuichi Nishimura (Japan)

Safa won 5–1 on aggregate.

=== Final ===
The first and second legs of the final were played on 31 October and 7 November 2008, respectively.

Team 1	Agg.	Team 2	1st leg	2nd leg
Al-Muharraq (Bahrain)	10–5	(Lebanon) Safa	5–1	5–4

==== Matches ====
31 October 2008

Al-Muharraq (Bahrain)	5–1	(Lebanon) Safa
Abdulrahman 19', 58'; Rico 32' (pen.), 54', 72'	(Report)	Tahan 77'

Bahrain National Stadium, Manama
Attendance: 6,000
Referee: Khalil Ibrahim Al Ghamdi (Saudi Arabia)
7 November 2008

Safa (Lebanon)	4–5	(Bahrain) Al-Muharraq
Al Saadi 15'; Azar 59'; Kassas 61', 65' (pen.)	(Report)	Rico 33', 50', 51'; Abdulrahman 45+1', 82'

Sports City Stadium, Beirut
Attendance: 2,000
Referee: Abdullah Al Hilali (Oman)

Al-Muharraq won 10–5 on aggregate.

== Statistics ==
=== Top goalscorers ===
Rank	Scorer	Team	Goals
1	(Brazil) Rico	(Bahrain) Al-Muharraq	19
2	(Singapore) Aleksander Duric	Singapore Armed Forces	9
3	(Nigeria) Ranty Martins Soleye	(India) Dempo	8
4	(Bahrain) Mahmood Abdulrahman	(Bahrain) Al-Muharraq	7
4	(Brazil) Peres de Oliveira	(Singapore) Home United	7
5	(Togo) Libambami Yedibahoma	(Oman) Al-Nahda	6
5	(Lebanon) Rony Azar	(Lebanon) Safa	6
5	(Lebanon) Mohammad Kassas	(Lebanon) Safa	6
5	(Bahrain) Rashed Jamal Salem	(Bahrain) Al-Najma	6
6	(Singapore) Shahril Ishak	(Singapore) Home United	5
6	(Singapore) Indra Sahdan Daud	(Singapore) Home United	5
6	(Jordan) Hassan Abdel Fattah	(Jordan) Al-Wahdat	5
6	(Lebanon) Hussein Tahan	(Lebanon) Safa	5

== See also ==
- 2008 AFC Champions League
- 2008 AFC President's Cup
