= Mohamad Zein Tahan =

Lebanese footballer (born 1988)

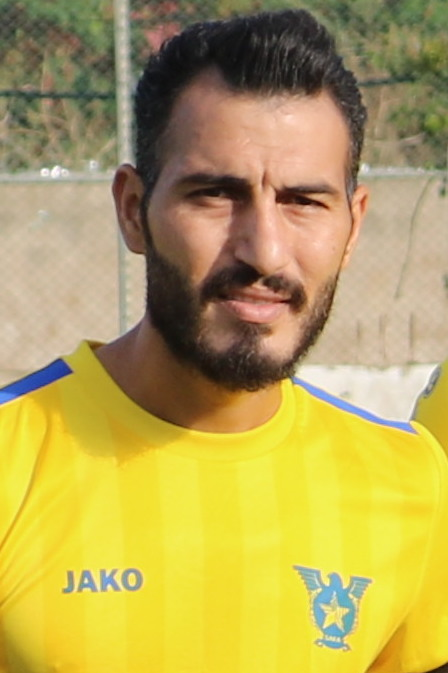
- Zein Tahan with Safa in 2020

Personal information
- Full name: Mohamad Zein El Abidine Ali Tahan
- Date of birth: 20 April 1988 (age 38)
- Place of birth: Aadloun, Lebanon
- Height: 1.81 m (5 ft 11 in)
- Position: Full-back

Team information
- Current team: Safa
- Number: 17

Youth career
- 2004–2006: Tripoli (Note: Olympic Beirut changed its name to AC Tripoli in 2005.)

Senior career*
| Years | Team | Apps | (Gls) |
| 2006–2008 | Tripoli | | |
| 2008–2023 | Safa | 200+ | (29) |
| 2023 | → Bourj (loan) | 0 | (0) |
| 2023–2024 | Bourj | 23 | (2) |
| 2024–2025 | Mabarra | 19 | (1) |
| 2025– | Safa | 1 | (0) |

International career^{‡}
| 2013–2022 | Lebanon | 38 | (1) |
- * Club domestic league appearances and goals as of 08:53, 31 July 2023 (UTC) ‡ National team caps and goals as of 14:52, 24 March 2022 (UTC)

Mohamad Zein El Abidine Ali Tahan (Arabic: محمد زين العابدين علي طحان, Lebanese Arabic pronunciation: [mˈħammad zeːn lˈʕaːbidiːn tˤɑħˈħaːn]; born 20 April 1988), better known as Mohamad Zein Tahan or simply Zein Tahan, is a Lebanese footballer who plays as a full-back for Lebanese Premier League club Safa.

== Club career ==
=== Safa ===
Tahan joined Safa in 2008 and subsequently captained the first team for several years. During his tenure, he won the Lebanese Premier League title three times with the club, along with other cup victories. On 17 May 2023, Zein Tahan left Safa on mutual terms.

=== Bourj and Mabarra ===
On 20 March 2023, Zein Tahan was sent on loan to Bourj to play in the 2023 Arab Club Champions Cup games against Emirati club Al Wahda. Three months later, Tahan joined Bourj permanently. After one season, he moved to Mabarra in the Lebanese Second Division.

== International career ==
Zein Tahan made his senior international debut for Lebanon on 29 May 2013, in a friendly against Oman. His first goal came on 19 December 2014, helping his side win 3–1 in a friendly against Pakistan. Zein Tahan was called up for the 2019 AFC Asian Cup squad, playing one game on 12 January 2019, against Saudi Arabia in a 2–0 defeat.

== Style of play ==
Mainly used as a right-back, Zein Tahan can also play on the left side. He is known for both his defensive and offensive contribution down the flank.

== Personal life ==
His brother, Hussein Tahan, was also an international footballer for Lebanon.

== Career statistics ==
=== International ===
As of match played 24 March 2022

Appearances and goals by national team and year
| National team | Year | Apps | Goals |
|---|---|---|---|
| Lebanon | 2013 | 8 | 0 |
| Lebanon | 2014 | 1 | 1 |
| Lebanon | 2015 | 8 | 0 |
| Lebanon | 2016 | 7 | 0 |
| Lebanon | 2017 | 3 | 0 |
| Lebanon | 2018 | 3 | 0 |
| Lebanon | 2019 | 5 | 0 |
| Lebanon | 2020 | 1 | 0 |
| Lebanon | 2021 | 1 | 0 |
| Lebanon | 2022 | 1 | 0 |
| Total | | 38 | 1 |

Scores and results list Lebanon's goal tally first, score column indicates score after each Zein Tahan goal.

List of international goals scored by Mohamad Zein Tahan
| No. | Date | Venue | Opponent | Score | Result | Competition | Ref. |
|---|---|---|---|---|---|---|---|
| 1 | 19 December 2014 | Saida Municipal Stadium, Sidon, Lebanon | Pakistan | 3–1 | 3–1 | Friendly | |

== Honours ==
Safa

- Lebanese Premier League: 2011–12, 2012–13, 2015–16
- Lebanese FA Cup: 2012–13
- Lebanese Elite Cup: 2009, 2012
- Lebanese Super Cup: 2013
- Lebanese Challenge Cup runner-up: 2022

Individual

- Lebanese Premier League Team of the Season: 2015–16, 2017–18
- Lebanese Challenge Cup top goalscorer: 2019 (Note: Tied with Abdel Fateh Achour, Amady Diop, Stephen Sarfo, and Shamel Socar)

== See also ==
- List of Lebanon international footballers
- List of association football families
