= Ali Al Saadi =

Lebanese footballer (born 1986)

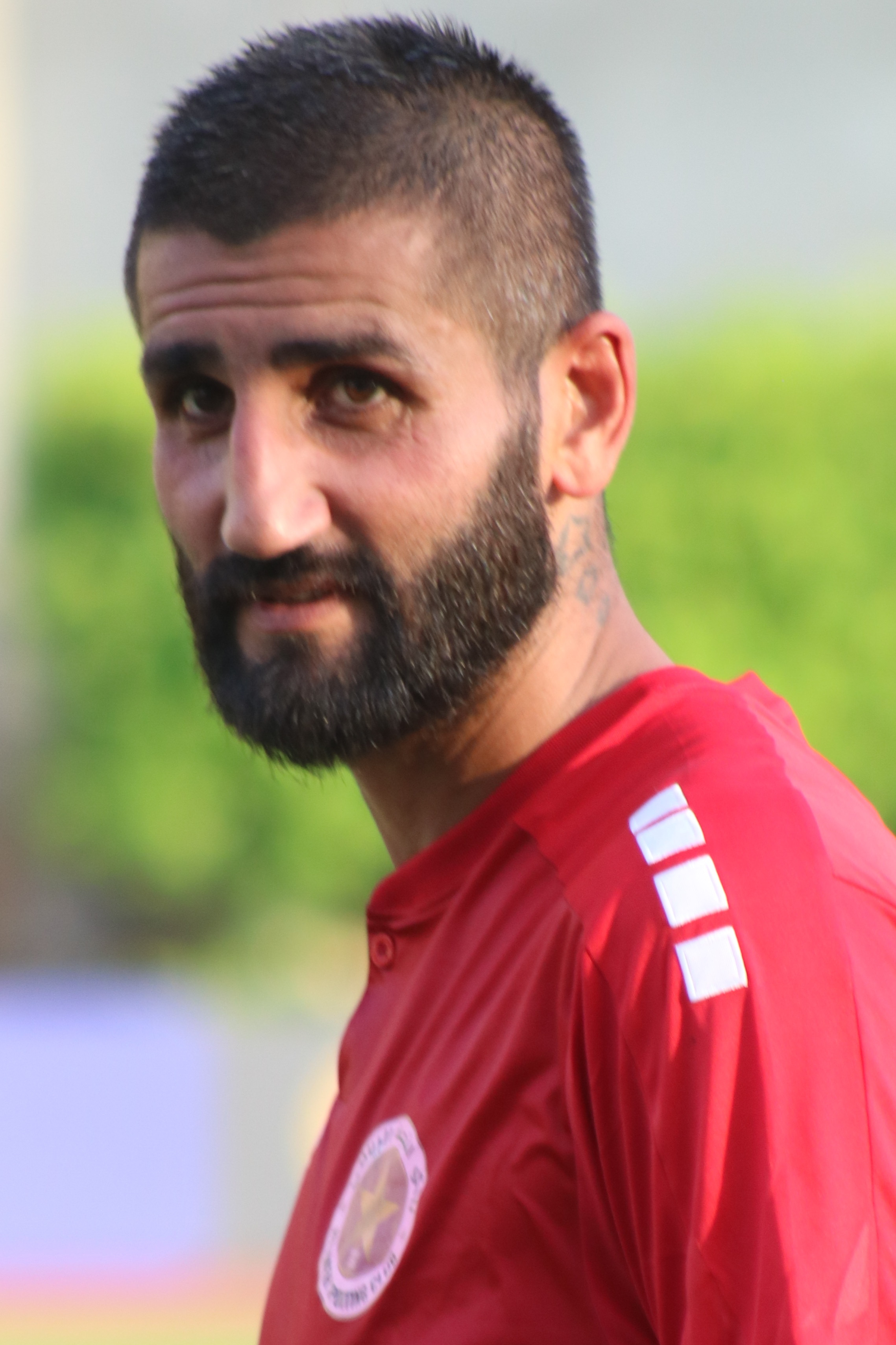
- Al Saadi with Nejmeh in 2020

Personal information
- Full name: Ali Mahmoud Al Saadi
- Date of birth: 20 April 1986 (age 40)
- Place of birth: Beirut, Lebanon
- Height: 1.85 m (6 ft 1 in)
- Position: Centre-back

Team information
- Current team: Irshad Chehim
- Number: 2

Senior career*
Years	Team	Apps	(Gls)
2005–2017	Safa		(42)
2014	→ Naft Maysan (loan)		(1)
2017–2018	Ahed	9	(0)
2018–2019	Safa	19	(1)
2019–2022	Nejmeh	24	(0)
2022–2023	Safa	18	(1)
2023–2024	Sagesse	7	(0)
2024–	Irshad Chehim	31	(2)

International career
2007	Lebanon U23		
2006–2013	Lebanon	49	(6)
- * Club domestic league appearances and goals as of 21 July 2026

Ali Mahmoud Al Saadi (Arabic: علي محمود السعدي; born 20 April 1986) is a Lebanese footballer who plays as a centre-back for Lebanese Second Division club Irshad Chehim.

Starting his career at Safa in 2005, Al Saadi remained there until 2017—albeit being sent on a six-month loan to Naft Maysan in Iraq. In 2017 he moved to Ahed for one season, before returning to Safa the following year. In 2019 Al Saadi moved to Nejmeh, then returned to Safa a second time in 2022.

Making his international debut for Lebanon in 2006, Al Saadi represented his nation in 49 games, scoring six goals in the process. As he was involved in the 2013 match-fixing scandal, Al Saadi was permanently excluded from the national team.

== Club career ==
Al Saadi began his senior career at Lebanese Premier League side Safa, during the 2005–06 season. He was part of the team that reached the 2008 AFC Cup Final where, despite Al Saadi scored in the second leg, Safa lost 10–5 on aggregate against Al-Muharraq. He helped his side win two league titles in a row, in 2011–12 and 2012–13, a Lebanese FA Cup, in 2012–13, two Lebanese Elite Cups, in 2009 and 2012, and a Lebanese Super Cup, in 2013.

In 2014 Al Saadi moved on a six-month loan to Iraqi Premier League side Naft Maysan, scoring one goal. Upon his return on loan, Al Saadi helped Safa win the 2015–16 Lebanese Premier League. On 7 July 2017, Al Saadi joined Ahed after 18 years at Safa. In his only season at Ahed (2017–18), Al Saadi won the league, FA Cup, and Super Cup.

In 2018 Al Saadi moved back to Safa, where he stayed for one season (2018–19). On 9 August 2019, the centre-back moved to Nejmeh, in a swap deal that included Hussein Sharafeddine and Ahmed Jalloul. Al Saadi returned to Safa once again in August 2022. He signed for Sagesse in 2023, and Irshad Chehim in 2024.

== International career ==
Al Saadi (right) against Sri Lankan striker Mohamed Izzadeen during the 2009 Nehru Cup

In 2007, Al Saadi played for the Lebanon national under-23 team at the 2008 Olympics qualifiers.

He participated in the Nehru Cup as part of the Lebanon national team and scored the winning goal in the opening match against India, defeating India 1–0. Additionally, he is known for giving Lebanon the early lead against South Korea in the 4th minute, in order to help his team earn their first victory against them in a FIFA-sanctioned competition.

He is one of 24 players involved to the 2013 match-fixing scandal, and suffered one season ban from club football, and a lifetime suspension from the national team.

== Career statistics ==
=== International ===
List of international goals scored by Ali Al Saadi
No.	Date	Venue	Opponent	Score	Result	Competition
1	19 August 2009	New Delhi	India	1–0	Win	2009 Nehru Cup
2	22 August 2009	New Delhi	Sri Lanka	3–4	Loss	2009 Nehru Cup
3	23 July 2011	Beirut	Bangladesh	4–0	Win	2014 FIFA World Cup qualification
4	15 November 2011	Beirut	South Korea	2–1	Win	2014 FIFA World Cup qualification
5	18 May 2012	Beirut	Jordan	1–2	Loss	Friendly
6	8 June 2012	Beirut	Uzbekistan	1–1	Draw	2014 FIFA World Cup qualification

== Honours ==
Safa

- Lebanese Premier League: 2011–12, 2012–13, 2015–16
- Lebanese FA Cup: 2012–13; runner-up: 2020–21
- Lebanese Elite Cup: 2009, 2012
- Lebanese Super Cup: 2013
- AFC Cup runner-up: 2008

Nejmeh

- Lebanese FA Cup: 2021–22
- Lebanese Elite Cup: 2021
- Lebanese Super Cup runner-up: 2021

Individual

- Lebanese Premier League Team of the Season: 2005–06, 2006–07, 2007–08, 2008–09, 2010–11, 2011–12, 2015–16

== See also ==
- List of Lebanon international footballers
