= Amer Khan (footballer, born 1983) =

Lebanese footballer (born 1983)

Personal information
- Full name: Amer Seifeddine Khan
- Date of birth: 4 June 1983 (age 43)
- Place of birth: Beirut, Lebanon
- Height: 1.84 m (6 ft 0 in)
- Position: Midfielder

Senior career*
Years	Team	Apps	(Gls)
2000–2011	Safa		(16)
2011	TuS Ennepetal	10	(0)
2012–2014	Safa	33	(2)
2014	CSV Bochum		

International career
2007–2013	Lebanon	30	(0)
- * Club domestic league appearances and goals

Amer Seifeddine Khan (Arabic: عامر سيف الدين خان; born 4 June 1983) is a Lebanese former footballer who played as a midfielder.

== Honours ==
Safa

- Lebanese Premier League: 2011–12, 2012–13
- Lebanese FA Cup: 2012–13; runner-up: 2007–08, 2010–11
- Lebanese Elite Cup: 2009, 2012
- Lebanese Super Cup: 2013; runner-up: 2012
- AFC Cup runner-up: 2008
