= Rony Azar =

Lebanese footballer (born 1983)

Personal information
- Full name: Rony Charbel Azar
- Date of birth: 20 February 1983 (age 43)
- Place of birth: Jernaya, Lebanon
- Height: 1.83 m (6 ft 0 in)
- Position: Forward

Youth career
- 1996–2002: Nejmet Sahra

Senior career*
Years	Team	Apps	(Gls)
2002–2005	Nejmet Sahra		
2005–2018	Safa		(25)
2016–2018	→ Tripoli (loan)	18	(2)
2018–2021	Racing Beirut		
2021–2022	Safa	18	(3)
2022–2023	Shabab Majdal Anjar		

International career
2003–2004	Lebanon U23		
2004	Lebanon	3	(0)
- * Club domestic league appearances and goals as of 14:32, 8 October 2022 (UTC)

Rony Charbel Azar (Arabic: روني شربل عازار; born 20 February 1983) is a Lebanese professional footballer who plays as a forward.

Coming through the youth system, Azar began his career at Nejmet Sahra, helping them win the Lebanese Third Division in 2002–03 and gain promotion to the Lebanese Second Division. In 2005 Azar moved to Safa in the Lebanese Premier League, staying there 10 seasons. During his stay, he helped Safa win multiple cups, most notably the club's first two league titles. He was also runner-up at the 2008 AFC Cup. Azar moved on a two-year loan to Tripoli, before joining Racing Beirut in 2018. He returned to Safa in summer 2021.

Azar played for the Lebanon national under-23 team between 2003 and 2004, during the 2004 Summer Olympics qualifiers. He also represented the senior side in 2004 at the 2006 FIFA World Cup qualification, playing three games.

== Club career ==
Growing up in the Sin el Fil district of Beirut, Azar began his career at Nejmet Sahra in 1996, aged 13. He helped his side win the Lebanese Third Division in 2002–03, gaining promotion to the Lebanese Second Division.

In 2005, Azar moved to Lebanese Premier League club Safa. He helped the club lift their first two league titles, in 2011–12 and 2012–13, their first two Lebanese Elite Cups (2009 and 2012), and their first Lebanese Super Cup (2013). Azar also won a Lebanese FA Cup with Safa, in 2012–13. Azar was also runner-up at the 2008 AFC Cup with Safa, losing the final 10–5 on aggregate to Al-Muharraq. Azar scored 25 league goals In his 10 seasons at Safa.

In 2016 Azar moved on a two-year loan to Tripoli, from Safa. He stayed there two seasons, scoring two league goals in 18 games in total. In 2018 Racing Beirut bought Azar from Safa on a permanent deal. He returned to Safa on 7 September 2021.

== International career ==
Azar played for the Lebanon national under-23 team at the 2004 Summer Olympics qualifiers, helping his side qualify to the second round of qualifications. His international senior debut for Lebanon came on 9 June 2004, during the 2006 FIFA World Cup qualification game against the Maldives; Lebanon won 3–0. Azar played three games for Lebanon, all in 2004 at the 2006 World Cup qualifiers.

== Style of play ==
Azar is known for being a prolific goalscorer from the bench; he is also well known for diving in the penalty area, often being defined as an "actor".

== Honours ==
Nejmeh Sahraa

- Lebanese Third Division: 2002–03

Safa

- Lebanese Premier League: 2011–12, 2012–13
- Lebanese FA Cup: 2012–13
- Lebanese Elite Cup: 2009, 2012
- Lebanese Super Cup: 2013
- AFC Cup runner-up: 2008
