= Abbas Atwi =

Abbas Atwi may refer to:

- Abbas Ahmed Atwi (born 1979), a Lebanese association football player
- Abbas Ali Atwi (born 1984), a Lebanese association football player
