= Abbas Ali Atwi =

Lebanese footballer (born 1984)

Abbas Atwi
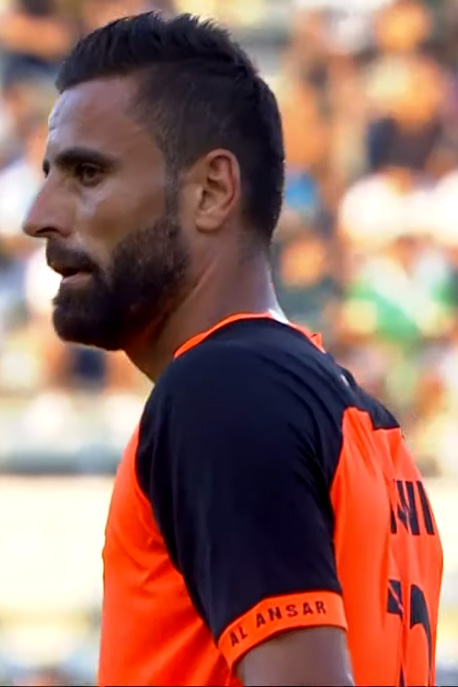
- Atwi with Ansar in 2019

Personal information
- Full name: Abbas Ali Atwi
- Date of birth: 15 December 1984 (age 41)
- Place of birth: Qabrikha, Lebanon
- Height: 1.80 m (5 ft 11 in)
- Position: Attacking midfielder

Team information
- Current team: Bourj (team manager)

Youth career
- 1998–2000: Bourj

Senior career*
Years	Team	Apps	(Gls)
2000–2002	Bourj		(8)
2002–2005	Olympic Beirut		(11)
2005–2017	Ahed	114+	(58)
2017–2021	Ansar	55	(8)
2021–2022	Bourj	18	(2)
Total		187+	(87)

International career
2005	Lebanon U23		
2002–2016	Lebanon	53	(4)

Managerial career
- 2022–: Bourj (team manager)
- * Club domestic league appearances and goals

Abbas Ali Atwi (Arabic: عباس علي عطوي; born 15 December 1984), also known as Onika (Arabic: أونيكا, also spelled Unica), is a Lebanese football coach and former player who is team manager of Lebanese Second Division club Bourj.

== Club career ==
Atwi joined Bourj's youth team aged 14; he made his senior debut in the Lebanese Second Division in 2000, in a 4–3 defeat against Ahed. Atwi moved to Lebanese Premier League side Olympic Beirut in 2002, with whom he won the domestic double (league and cup) in his first season.

In 2005 Atwi signed for Ahed. He scored 58 league goals and won five league titles in 12 years at the club.

Atwi joined Ansar in 2017, helping them win their first league title in 14 years in 2021.

On 18 June 2021, Atwi moved back to Bourj, where he had begun his career. He announced his retirement on 20 May 2022, following the 2021–22 season.

== International career ==
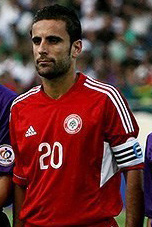
Atwi captaining the Lebanon national team in 2013.

In 2005, Atwi played for the Lebanon national under-23 team; he scored from the half-way line in a game against Japan U23, which Lebanon lost 2–1.

Atwi has played for the Lebanon national team between 2002 and 2016, scoring four goals in over 50 appearances. He has played at the 2006, 2010, 2014, and 2018 FIFA World Cup qualifiers, and the 2004 and 2015 AFC Asian Cup qualifiers, as well as at the 2002 and 2004 WAFF Championships and at the 2002 Arab Cup.

== Personal life ==
Atwi earned his nickname "Onika" in reference to the Lebanese chocolate bar Unica as, after being involved in a non-fatal car accident as a kid, the first thing he asked his mother was the chocolate bar that he was holding in his hand during the accident.

He is not related to fellow Lebanese footballer Abbas Ahmad Atwi.

== Career statistics ==
=== International ===
Scores and results list Lebanon's goal tally first, score column indicates score after each Atwi goal.

List of international goals scored by Abbas Ali Atwi
No.	Date	Venue	Opponent	Score	Result	Competition
1	26 May 2004	Beirut, Lebanon	Bahrain		2–2	Friendly
2	2 February 2005	Doha, Qatar	Bahrain		1–2	Friendly
3	22 March 2013	Camille Chamoun Sports City Stadium, Beirut, Lebanon	Thailand	5–2	5–2	2015 AFC Asian Cup qualification
4	24 May 2015	Saida Municipal Stadium, Sidon, Lebanon	Syria	1–2	2–2	Friendly

== Honours ==
Bourj

- Lebanese Challenge Cup: 2021
- Lebanese Second Division: 2000–01

Olympic Beirut

- Lebanese Premier League: 2002–03
- Lebanese FA Cup: 2002–03

Ahed

- Lebanese Premier League: 2007–08, 2009–10, 2010–11, 2014–15, 2016–17
- Lebanese FA Cup: 2008–09, 2010–11
- Lebanese Elite Cup: 2008, 2010, 2011, 2013, 2015
- Lebanese Super Cup: 2008, 2010, 2011, 2015

Ansar

- Lebanese Premier League: 2020–21
- Lebanese FA Cup: 2020–21

Individual

- Lebanese Premier League Best Player: 2002–03
- Lebanese Premier League Best Young Player: 2001–02
- Lebanese Premier League Team of the Season: 2002–03, 2005–06, 2007–08, 2009–10, 2010–11, 2012–13, 2014–15, 2015–16, 2018–19
- Lebanese Premier League top assist provider: 2007–08, 2009–10

== See also ==
- List of Lebanon international footballers
