= List of Lebanon international footballers =

The Lebanon national football team has represented Lebanon in international association football since 1940. The Lebanese Football Association (LFA) was founded in 1933 and became a member of the Fédération Internationale de Football Association (FIFA) three years later. However, the team did not play its first official international match until 27 April 1940, suffering a 5–1 defeat to Mandatory Palestine in a friendly game. In 1964, Lebanon joined the Asian Football Confederation (AFC) and continues to compete as a member of the organisation.

== Players ==
Key
	Played for the national team in the past year
Bold	Still playing competitive football

As of match played 17 November 2026

Lebanon national football team players with at least 30 appearances
No.	Player	Caps	Goals	Debut		Last or most recent match		Refs.
No.	Player	Caps	Goals	Date	Opponent	Date	Opponent	Refs.
1	**Hassan Maatouk**	123	26	27 January 2006	Saudi Arabia	11 June 2024	Bangladesh	
2	**Mohamad Haidar**	110	6	17 August 2011	Syria	4 June 2026	Yemen	
3	Abbas Ahmad Atwi	89	8	1 September 2002	Jordan	29 March 2016	Myanmar	
4	Roda Antar	83	20	18 August 1998	Armenia	29 March 2016	Myanmar	
5	Youssef Mohamad	81	3	16 August 1999	Saudi Arabia	29 March 2016	Myanmar	
6	**Nader Matar**	71	4	22 January 2012	Iraq	11 June 2024	Bangladesh	
6	Jamal Taha	71	12	17 May 1993	India	18 October 2000	Thailand	
8	Walid Ismail	69	1	3 March 2010	Syria	17 January 2019	North Korea	
9	**Nour Mansour**	67	3	3 March 2010	Syria	17 January 2024	China	
10	Vardan Ghazaryan	66	21	6 December 1995	Slovakia	30 May 2001	Thailand	
11	**Hassan Chaito**	63	6	6 November 2011	Iraq	7 September 2021	South Korea	
12	**Haytham Faour**	61	0	17 August 2011	Syria	12 January 2019	Saudi Arabia	
13	**Mehdi Khalil**	58	0	17 March 2013	Bahrain	19 November 2024	Myanmar	
14	**Rabih Ataya**	56	5	11 March 2012	Egypt	15 December 2024	Kuwait	
14	Ali Hamam	56	3	14 January 2009	Vietnam	12 January 2019	Saudi Arabia	
14	**Kassem El Zein**	56	2	14 October 2014	Saudi Arabia	26 November 2025	Sudan	
17	Faisal Antar	54	5	18 August 1998	Armenia	30 October 2007	India	
18	Abbas Ali Atwi	53	4	3 September 2002	Iran	11 June 2015	Kuwait	
18	**Hilal El-Helwe**	53	9	8 October 2015	Myanmar	22 January 2024	Tajikistan	
18	Bilal El Najjarine	53	1	23 April 2004	Syria	8 September 2015	South Korea	
21	Ahmad El Naamani	52	0	22 June 1997	Kuwait	27 December 2006	Sudan	
22	Fouad Hijazi	51	1	12 January 1993	Kuwait	12 November 2003	Jordan	
22	Gurgen Engibaryan	51	1	6 December 1995	Slovakia	30 May 2001	Thailand	
24	Mootaz El Jounaidi	50	0	20 January 2008	China	10 September 2019	Oman	
24	Haitham Zein	50	16	22 June 1997	Kuwait	19 June 2004	Syria	
26	**Ali Al Saadi**	49	6	27 January 2006	Saudi Arabia	31 January 2013	Qatar	
26	**Hussein Zein**	49	0	5 February 2016	Bahrain	4 June 2026	Yemen	
28	Ziad Al Samad	47	0	17 February 1999	Czech Republic	24 June 2012	Iraq	
28	**Mostafa Matar**	47	0	27 December 2018	Bahrain	17 November 2026	Palestine	
30	Mahmoud El Ali	46	12	16 January 2007	Syria	14 February 2012	Kuwait	
30	Mohamad Ghaddar	46	19	27 January 2006	Saudi Arabia	28 March 2017	Hong Kong	
32	Abbas Chahrour	43	2	3 October 1996	Kazakhstan	31 January 2001	Iraq	
33	Zaher Al Indari	42	7	12 May 1996	Turkmenistan	4 April 2001	Bahrain	
33	Nasrat Al Jamal	42	3	25 August 1999	Oman	23 January 2009	North Korea	
35	Gevorg Karapetyan	41	2	16 January 1996	Cyprus	20 August 1999	United Arab Emirates	
35	**Walid Shour**	41	1	2 September 2021	United Arab Emirates	4 October 2026	Kyrgyzstan	
37	Moussa Hojeij	39	6	8 December 1996	Georgia	26 December 2002	Bahrain	
38	Mouhamad Chamass	38	0	22 November 2009	China	29 November 2013	Kuwait	
38	**Mohamad Zein Tahan**	38	1	29 May 2013	Oman	24 March 2022	Syria	
38	Soony Saad	38	7	29 May 2013	Oman	12 January 2024	Qatar	
41	Ali Fakih	37	0	18 March 1993	Qatar	30 May 2001	Thailand	
41	**Adnan Haidar**	37	1	16 October 2012	Yemen	19 November 2019	North Korea	
43	Ibrahim Hosni	36	0	20 January 1993	Kuwait	23 August 1999	Jordan	
43	Lary Mehanna	36	0	24 December 2006	Somalia	6 November 2014	United Arab Emirates	
43	Babken Melikyan	36	3	7 May 1993	India	27 July 1997	Kuwait	
43	Joan Oumari	36	4	6 September 2013	Syria	29 March 2022	Iran	
47	Ahmad Sakr	35	0	18 March 1993	Qatar	22 August 2003	Syria	
48	Ramez Dayoub	34	0	3 October 2004	Kuwait	12 June 2012	South Korea	
48	Khaled Hamieh	34	2	22 August 2003	Syria	1 April 2009	Namibia	
48	**Nassar Nassar**	34	0	11 October 2016	Equatorial Guinea	4 June 2026	Yemen	
48	**Karim Darwich**	34	3	12 November 2020	Bahrain	4 June 2026	Yemen	
52	**George Felix Melki**	33	1	15 November 2018	Uzbekistan	6 May 2024	Palestine	
53	Mohamad Halawi	32	1	27 July 1997	Kuwait	30 October 2007	India	
53	**Akram Moghrabi**	32	4	23 September 2007	United Arab Emirates	16 October 2012	Yemen	
53	Wael Nazha	32	8	20 January 1993	Kuwait	27 September 1998	Saudi Arabia	
56	**Ali Tneich**	31	1	30 December 2022	United Arab Emirates	14 October 2025	Bhutan	
57	Amer Khan	30	1	23 September 2007	United Arab Emirates	4 June 2013	South Korea	

== See also ==
- List of Lebanon international footballers born outside Lebanon
