= Mohamad Hammoud (footballer, born 1987) =

Lebanese footballer (born 1987)

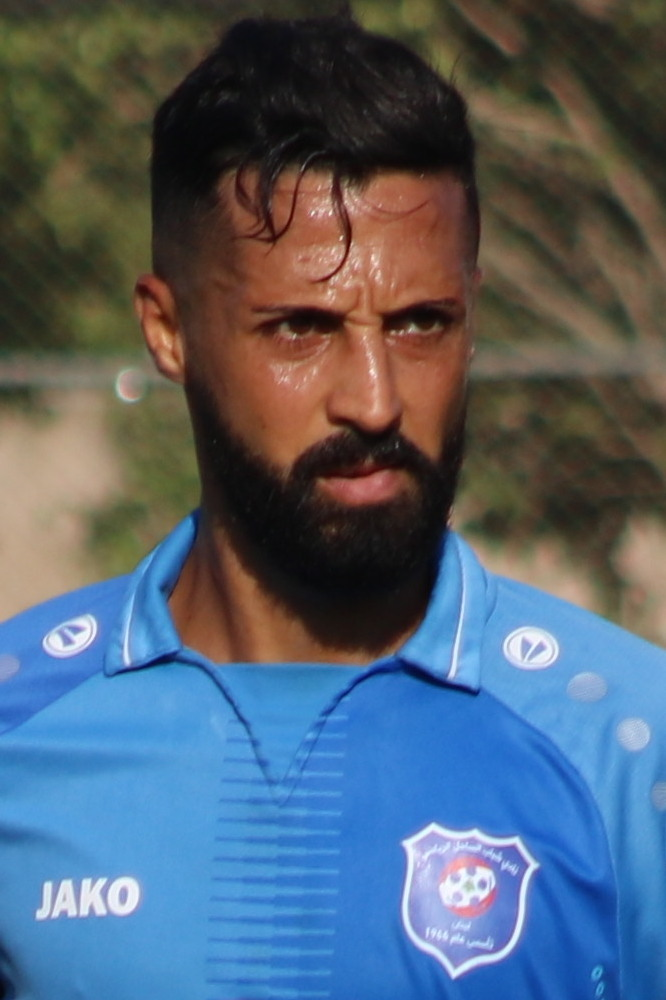
- Hammoud with Shabab Sahel in 2020

Personal information
- Full name: Mohamad Hassan Hammoud
- Date of birth: 1 May 1987 (age 39)
- Place of birth: Jdeideh, Lebanon
- Height: 1.75 m (5 ft 9 in)
- Position: Full-back

Team information
- Current team: Bourj

Senior career*
Years	Team	Apps	(Gls)
2003–2005	Olympic Beirut		
2006–2014	Ansar		(6)
2014–2016	Safa	32	(0)
2016–2018	Akhaa Ahli Aley	33	(2)
2018–2022	Shabab Sahel	59	(1)
2022–2023	Bourj	17	(0)
2023–2024	Riyadi Abbasiyah	14	(1)
2024–	Bourj	19	(0)

International career
2007	Lebanon U23		
2011–2015	Lebanon	7	(0)
- * Club domestic league appearances and goals as of 5 July 2025

Mohamad Hassan Hammoud (Arabic: محمد حسن حمود; born 1 May 1987) is a Lebanese footballer who plays as a full-back for Lebanese Second Division club Bourj.

== Club career ==
Starting his career at Olympic Beirut, Hammoud moved to Ansar in 2006, representing the club at the 2008 AFC Cup, before joining Safa in 2014. After two seasons, Hammoud joined rivals Akhaa Ahli Aley, staying at the club for two seasons, before moving to Shabab Sahel in 2018. On 17 July 2022, Hammoud joined Bourj on a free transfer. He moved to Riyadi Abbasiyah in the Lebanese Second Division one season later, on 25 July 2023. Hammoud returned to Bourj ahead of the 2024–25 Lebanese League.

== International career ==
Between 2011 and 2015, Hammoud represented the Lebanon national team seven times, participating in the 2014 FIFA World Cup qualifiers.

== Honours ==
Olympic Beirut

- Lebanese FA Cup runner-up: 2004–05

Ansar

- Lebanese Premier League: 2006–07
- Lebanese FA Cup: 2006–07, 2009–10, 2011–12
- Lebanese Super Cup: 2012; runner-up: 2010
- Lebanese Elite Cup runner-up: 2008, 2010

Safa

- Lebanese Premier League: 2015–16
- Lebanese Elite Cup runner-up: 2014, 2015

Shabab Sahel

- Lebanese Elite Cup: 2019
