= Mouhamad Chamass =

Lebanese footballer (born 1987)

- Chamass with Lebanon in 2013

Personal information
- Full name: Mouhamad Ali Chamass
- Date of birth: 25 February 1987 (age 39)
- Place of birth: Kouakh, Lebanon
- Height: 1.72 m (5 ft 8 in)
- Position: Midfielder

Youth career
- 2004–2006: Nejmeh

Senior career*
Years	Team	Apps	(Gls)
2006–2017	Nejmeh	104+	(1)
2017–2018	Al Shabab Al Arabi	16	(1)
2018–2020	Safa	12	(1)

International career
2009–2013	Lebanon	38	(0)
- * Club domestic league appearances and goals

Mouhamad Ali Chamass (Arabic: محمد علي شمص; born 25 February 1987) is a Lebanese former footballer who played as a midfielder.

== Club career ==
Chamass signed for Lebanese Premier League side Nejmeh's youth sector on 2 July 2004, and was promoted to the first team ahead of the 2006–07 season.

== Honours ==
Nejmeh

- Lebanese Premier League: 2008–09, 2013–14
- Lebanese FA Cup: 2015–16
- Lebanese Elite Cup: 2014, 2016
- Lebanese Super Cup: 2009, 2014, 2016

Individual

- Lebanese Premier League Team of the Season: 2010–11

== See also ==
- List of Lebanon international footballers
