= Hussein Tahan =

Lebanese footballer (born 1982)

Personal information
- Full name: Hussein Ali Tahan
- Date of birth: 10 March 1982 (age 44)
- Place of birth: Ansariyah, Lebanon
- Height: 1.72 m (5 ft 8 in)
- Position: Forward

Team information
- Current team: Safa (head coach)

Senior career*
Years	Team	Apps	(Gls)
1999–2003	Bourj		(6)
2004–2011	Safa		(19)
2011–2015	Akhaa Ahli Aley	75+	(23)
2015–2016	Sagesse	19	(1)
2016–2019	Racing Beirut	27	(0)
Total		?	(49)

International career
2003	Lebanon	1	(0)

Managerial career
- 2020–2023: Bourj (assistant)
- 2023–2024: Bourj
- 2025: Racing Beirut
- 2025–: Safa
- * Club domestic league appearances and goals

Hussein Ali Tahan (Arabic: حسين علي طحان; born 10 March 1982) is a Lebanese football coach and former player who is the head coach of Lebanese Premier League club Safa.

== International career ==
Tahan appeared with Lebanon in an international friendly on 19 September 2003 against Bahrain, in their 4–3 defeat.

== Managerial career ==
Tahan was appointed assistant coach of Bourj in November 2020. He was appointed head coach in January 2023, and resigned in 2024. In July 2025, Tahan was appointed head coach of Safa.

== Personal life ==
His brother, Mohamad Zein Tahan, was also an international footballer for Lebanon.

== Honours ==
Bourj

- Lebanese Second Division: 2000–01

Safa

- Lebanese Elite Cup: 2009
- AFC Cup runner-up: 2008
- Lebanese FA Cup runner-up: 2007–08, 2010–11

Racing Beirut

- Lebanese Challenge Cup: 2016, 2017

== See also ==
- List of association football families
