= Mohammed Al-Mashaikhi =

Omani footballer (born 1981)

Personal information
- Full name: Mohammed Sheiba Al-Mashaikhi
- Date of birth: 4 February 1981 (age 45)
- Place of birth: Abu Dhabi, United Arab Emirates
- Position: Midfielder

Team information
- Current team: Sur

Youth career
- 1998–2001: Ja'lan

Senior career*
Years	Team	Apps	(Gls)
2001	Ja'lan	?	(?)
2002–2007	Al-Nasr	?	(?)
2007–2014	Al-Nahda	?	(35)
2014	Al-Shabab	?	(2)
2015–2020	Sur		

International career
2008	Oman	3	(0)
- * Club domestic league appearances and goals

Mohammed Shibh Al-Mashaikhi (Arabic: محمد الشيبة المشايخي; born 4 February 1981), commonly known as Mohammed Al-Mashaikhi, is an Omani footballer who plays for Sur SC in Oman Professional League.

== Club career statistics ==
Club	Season	Division	League		Cup		Continental		Other		Total	
Club	Season	Division	Apps	Goals	Apps	Goals	Apps	Goals	Apps	Goals	Apps	Goals
Al-Nahda	2008–09	Oman Professional League	-	11	-	2	0	0	-	0	-	13
Al-Nahda	2009–10	Oman Professional League	-	6	-	0	0	0	-	0	-	6
Al-Nahda	2010–11	Oman Professional League	-	4	-	1	0	0	-	0	-	5
Al-Nahda	2011–12	Oman Professional League	-	5	-	1	0	0	-	0	-	6
Al-Nahda	2012–13	Oman Professional League	-	8	-	0	0	0	-	0	-	8
Al-Nahda	2013–14	Oman Professional League	-	1	-	0	0	0	-	0	-	1
Al-Nahda	Total		-	35	-	4	0	0	-	0	-	39
Al-Shabab	2013–14	Oman Professional League	-	2	-	0	0	0	-	0	-	2
Al-Shabab	Total		-	2	-	0	0	0	-	0	-	2
Career total			-	37	-	4	0	0	-	0	-	41

== International career ==
Mohammed was selected for the national team for the first time in 2008. He has made three appearances in the 2010 FIFA World Cup qualification.

== Honours ==
=== Club ===
- With Al-Nahda
  - Omani League (2): 2006-07, 2008-09; Runner-up 2005-06
  - Sultan Qaboos Cup (0): Runner-up 2008, 2012
  - Oman Super Cup (2): 2009, 2014
