= Jorge Muñoz (footballer, born 1981) =

Chilean footballer

Personal information
- Full name: Jorge Antonio Muñoz Abarca
- Date of birth: 30 July 1981 (age 45)
- Place of birth: San Bernardo, Santiago, Chile
- Height: 1.74 m (5 ft 9 in)
- Position: Midfielder

Youth career
- Palestino

Senior career*
Years	Team	Apps	(Gls)
2000–2005	Palestino	39	(3)
2002	→ Barnechea (loan)		
2005–2006	Santiago Wanderers	1	(0)
2007	Santiago Morning	16	(1)
2007–2008	Perak FA		
2009	Santiago Morning	15	(0)
Total		71	(4)
- * Club domestic league appearances and goals

Jorge Antonio Muñoz Abarca (born 30 July 1981) is a Chilean former professional footballer who played as a midfielder.

== Career ==
Muñoz played for Chilean clubs Palestino (2000–05), Barnechea (2002), Santiago Wanderers (2005–06), and Santiago Morning (2007 and 2009), with an intervening spell in the Malaysian Super League with Perak FA (2007–08).

On 9 November 2007, Malaysian media reported that Perak FA had secured Muñoz' services along with his fellow countryman, Mario Berrios.

Following his retirement, he graduated as a football manager at the INAF (National Football Institute) and has mainly worked for football academies.
