= Mustafa Shehdeh =

Jordanian footballer (born 1978)

Personal information
- Full name: Mustafa Shehdeh Abu Romeh
- Date of birth: 5 February 1978 (age 48)
- Place of birth: Amman, Jordan
- Height: 1.70 m (5 ft 7 in)
- Position: Midfielder

Senior career*
Years	Team	Apps	(Gls)
1998–2005	Al-Baqa'a SC		
2005–2006	Al-Wahdat		
2006–2011	Shabab Al-Ordon		
2011–2012	Al-Baqa'a SC		

International career
2002–2008	Jordan	29	(3)
- * Club domestic league appearances and goals

Mustafa Shehdeh Abu Romeh (born 5 February 1978) is a retired Jordanian footballer.

== International goals ==
#	Date	Venue	Opponent	Score	Competition
1	7 September 2002	Damascus	Iraq	2-3	2002 West Asian Football Federation Championship
2	18 February 2004	Amman	Laos	5-0	2006 FIFA World Cup qualification
3	8 October 2004	Bangkok	Thailand	3-2	Friendly
