= Libambami Yedibahoma =

Togolese footballer

Personal information
- Full name: Yedibahoma Datoma Libambani
- Date of birth: 13 January 1979 (age 47)
- Place of birth: Togo
- Height: 1.92 m (6 ft 4 in)
- Position: Striker

Senior career*
Years	Team	Apps	(Gls)
1999–2000	Club Africain	65	(15)
2002–2005	Liberty Professionals	67	(18)
2005–2008	Al-Nahda	85	(38)
2009–?	Taliya Club	22	(8)

International career
1998–2006	Togo	9	(1)
- * Club domestic league appearances and goals

Yedibahoma Datoma Libambani (born 13 January 1979) is a Togolese former footballer who played as a forward.

== Career ==
Yedibahoma's club was beaten in the final of the African Cup Winners' Cup final in December by Africa Sports of the Ivory Coast. He played three years for Al-Nahda in the Omani League and signed in 2009 for Taliya Club Seeb.

== International career ==
In 1998, Yedibahoma scored on his debut for the Togo national team against São Tomé and Príncipe but did not play for the next 12 months.
