= 2016–17 Lebanese Premier League =

Lebanese Premier League
- Season: 2016–17
- Champions: Al Ahed
- Relegated: Shabab Al-Sahel, Al Egtmaaey Tripoli
- Matches: 131
- Goals: 365 (2.79 per match)
- Top goalscorer: Abou Bakr Al-Mel (16 goals)
- Biggest home win: Al-Safa 6-0 Salam Zgharta
- Biggest away win: Al-Akhaa Al-Ahli 1-6 Nejmeh SC
- Highest scoring: Al Egtmaaey Tripoli 3-6 Tripoli SC

The 2016–17 Lebanese Premier League, officially known as the Alfa Lebanese Football League (Arabic: دوري ألفا اللبناني لكرة القدم) for sponsorship reasons, was the 56th season of top-tier football in Lebanon. A total of twelve teams competed in the league, with Safa the defending champions.

After 21 rounds, Al Ahed won the league for the 5th time in its history. In the 21st round, Al Ahed needed a win against rivals Nejmeh to win the League but Nejmeh had forfeited and Al Ahed automatically won the match and became the champions of the Lebanese Premier League.

== Teams ==
Hekmeh and Shabab Al-Ghazieh were relegated to the second level of Lebanese football after ending the 2015–16 season in the bottom two places. They were replaced by Tadamon Sour and Al Akhaa Al Ahli who won promotion from the second tier.

=== Stadia and locations ===
Locations of teams in the 2016–17 Lebanese Premier League
Locations of teams in the 2016–17 Lebanese Premier League within Beirut

Club	Location	Stadium	Stadium capacity	Coach
Al Ahed	Beirut	Beirut Municipal Stadium	22,500	(Germany) Robert Jaspert
Al Akhaa Al Ahli	Aley	Amin Abdelnour Stadium	3,500	(Syria) Hussein Afash
Al Ansar	Beirut	Beirut Municipal Stadium	22,500	(Serbia) Zoran Pešić
Al Egtmaaey Tripoli	Tripoli	Tripoli Municipal Stadium	22,000	(Syria) Iyad Abd Al Kareem
Al Nejmeh	Beirut	Rafic El-Hariri Stadium	5,000	(Lebanon) Jamal Al Haj
Al Nabi Sheet	Zahlé	Al-Nabi Shayth Stadium	5,000	(Lebanon) Mahmoud Hammoud
Racing Beirut	Beirut	Bourj Hammoud Stadium	8,000	(Lebanon) Moussa Hojaij
Safa	Beirut	Safa Stadium	4,000	(Lebanon) Emile Rustom
Salam Zgharta	Zgharta	Zgharta Stadium	5,000	(Tunisia) Tareq Jaraya
Shabab Al-Sahel	Beirut	Beirut Municipal Stadium	22,500	(Lebanon) Samir Saad
Tadamon Sour	Tyre	Sour Stadium	6,500	(Lebanon) Mohammed Zouheir
Tripoli SC	Tripoli	Tripoli Municipal Stadium	22,000	(Lebanon) Fadi Al Omari

== Table ==
Pos	Team	Pld	W	D	L	GF	GA	GD	Pts	Promotion or relegation
1	Al Ahed	22	15	4	3	41	14	+27	49	Qualification to 2018 AFC Champions League preliminary round 1
2	Salam Zgharta	22	12	4	6	35	29	+6	40	Qualification to Arab Champions League 2018
3	Al Nejmeh (Note: Nejmeh SC had forfeited in the round of 21 and lost 6 other points.)	22	11	6	5	36	22	+14	33	
4	Al Ansar	22	9	5	8	35	40	−5	32	
5	Al Nabi Sheet	22	9	4	9	26	24	+2	31	
6	Tadamon Sour	22	9	3	10	25	25	0	30	
7	Racing Beirut	22	8	6	8	26	30	−4	30	
8	Al-Akhaa Al-Ahli	22	9	2	11	34	36	−2	29	
9	Tripoli SC	22	8	4	10	34	31	+3	28	
10	Safa (Note: Had 3 points deducted)	22	8	7	7	32	32	0	28	
11	Shabab Al-Sahel	22	7	4	11	20	22	−2	25	Relegation to Lebanese Second Division
12	Al Egtmaaey Tripoli	22	2	2	18	21	60	−39	8	Relegation to Lebanese Second Division

Updated to match(es) played on 29 April 2017. Source: FIFA
Rules for classification: 1) Points; 2) Goal difference; 3) Number of goals scored

== Top goalscorers ==
Rank	Player	Club	Goals	Games played
1	(Lebanon) Abou Bakr Al-Mel	Tripoli SC	16	20
2	(Lebanon) Akram Moghrabi	Al Nejmeh	12	21
3	(Ghana) Cofie Bekoe	Al Egtmaaey Tripoli	11	20
3	(Portugal) Élio Martins	Al-Akhaa Al-Ahli	11	20
4	(Egypt) Ahmed Hegazy	Al-Akhaa Al-Ahli	9	21
5	(Mauritania) Mamadou Niass	Salam Zgharta	8	21
6	(Lebanon) Mohamad Kdouh	Al Ahed	7	17
6	(Lebanon) Mohammad Jaafar	Racing Beirut	7	18
6	(Lebanon) Ali Al Saadi	Safa	7	20
6	(Lebanon) Feiz Shamsin	Tripoli SC	7	21
10	(Lebanon) Rabih Ataya	Al Ansar	6	9
10	(Lebanon) Roda Antar	Tadamon Sour	6	16
10	(Senegal) Lamine Fané	Tadamon Sour	6	17
10	(Syria) Abdelrazaq Al-Hussain	Al Nejmeh	6	19
10	(Senegal) Dominique Mendy	Safa	6	19
10	(Ghana) Michael Helegbe	Tadamon Sour	6	20
10	(Lebanon) Mohammad Salem	Shabab Al-Sahel	6	22
