= Rogério Pilo =

Brazilian footballer

Personal information
- Full name: José Rogeiro Antunes Estefane Júnior
- Date of birth: March 3, 1980 (age 46)
- Place of birth: Curitiba, Brazil
- Position: Forward

Youth career
- 1998–1999: Clube Atlético Paranaense (B)

Senior career*
Years	Team	Apps	(Gls)
2000–2001	Clube Atlético Paranaense		
- Santos
2002	Mirassol Futebol Clube		
2003	Atlético Clube Paranavaí		
2004	Esporte Clube São Bento		
2005	Sapiranga,		
2006	Porto Alegre Futebol Clube		
2006	Tubarão Futebol Clube		
2006	Nacional-AM		
2007	Sur		
2009	Zobon		
2009	Al Arabi		
2010–2011	Luis Ángel Firpo		
2013–2015	América SP		
- * Club domestic league appearances and goals

José Rogeiro Antunes Estefane Júnior (born March 3, 1980, in Curitiba, Brazil), known as Rogério Pilo, is a Brazilian footballer.
