= Mahmoud El Ali =

Lebanese footballer (born 1984)

Personal information
- Full name: Mahmoud Mohamad El Ali
- Date of birth: 4 March 1984 (age 42)
- Place of birth: Aabboudiye, Lebanon
- Height: 1.83 m (6 ft 0 in)
- Position: Striker

Senior career*
Years	Team	Apps	(Gls)
2004–2005	Rayyan		(5)
2005–2013	Ahed		(52)
2013	Persiba Balikpapan	16	(3)
Total		?	(60)

International career
2007–2012	Lebanon	46	(12)
- * Club domestic league appearances and goals

Mahmoud Mohamad El Ali (Arabic: محمود محمد العلي; born 4 March 1984) is a Lebanese former professional footballer who played as a striker. El Ali represented the Lebanon national team, scoring 12 goals in 46 games, before being banned for life from professional football due to his involvement in the 2013 Lebanese match fixing scandal.

== Club career ==
El Ali began his senior career at Lebanese Premier League club Rayyan, during the 2004–05 season. The forward scored five goals. In 2005 El Ali moved to Ahed, scoring four goals and helping his side finish in fifth place during the 2005–06 season. The following season (2006–07), El Ali improved on his previous season's numbers, scoring 12 goals. However, Ahed finished in fifth place once again. In 2007–08, El Ali helped his side win their first league title, scoring three goals.

The following three seasons, El Ali lifted two more league titles (2009–10 and 2010–11), two Lebanese FA Cups (2008–09 and 2010–11), three Lebanese Elite Cups (2008, 2010, and 2011), and three Lebanese Super Cups (2008, 2010, 2011). The forward was also part of the Lebanese Premier League Team of the Season for two consecutive seasons, in 2010–11 and 2011–12.

In January 2013, El Ali moved to Indonesian Liga 1 side Persiba Balikpapan. He scored three goals in 16 league games. On 26 February 2013, El Ali was accused of illegal betting on several national and continental games concerning Lebanese teams and the national team. He was banned for life from football and was fined $15,000. Following El Ali's involvement in the 2013 Lebanese match-fixing scandal, on 26 April 2013, Persiba Balikpapan terminated El Ali's contract with the club.

== International career ==
El Ali made his international debut for Lebanon 16 June 2007, at the 2007 WAFF Championship, against Syria; Lebanon lost 1–0. The Lebanese forward's first international goal came on 23 September 2007, in a friendly against the United Arab Emirates (UAE); the match finished in a 1–1 draw. On 17 July 2011, El Ali scored his first, and only, international brace; he scored twice against the UAE in a friendly.

In 2013, El Ali was accused of match fixing a 2014 FIFA World Cup qualification game against Qatar, on 14 November 2012, purposely throwing the match in the opponents favour. Lebanon lost 1–0. Following the investigations, on 24 April 2013 El Ali was banned for life from the sport. El Ali retired with 12 goals in 46 appearances for the national team.

== Career statistics ==
=== International ===
List of international goals scored by Mahmoud El Ali
No.	Date	Venue	Opponent	Score	Result	Competition
1	23 September 2007	Dubai, United Arab Emirates	United Arab Emirates	1–1	Draw	Friendly
2	8 October 2007	Saida, Lebanon	India	4–1	Win	2010 FIFA World Cup Qualification
3	2 January 2008	Kuwait City, Kuwait	Kuwait	2–3	Loss	Friendly
4	9 April 2008	Beirut, Lebanon	Maldives	4–0	Win	2011 AFC Asian Cup qualification
5	7 June 2008	Riyadh, Saudi Arabia	Saudi Arabia	1–4	Loss	2010 FIFA World Cup Qualification
6	21 January 2009	Phuket, Thailand	Thailand	2–1	Loss	2009 King's Cup
7	6 January 2010	Sidon, Lebanon	Vietnam	1–1	Draw	2011 AFC Asian Cup qualification
8	17 July 2011	Al Ain, United Arab Emirates	United Arab Emirates	2–6	Loss	Friendly
9	17 July 2011	Al Ain, United Arab Emirates	United Arab Emirates	2–6	Loss	Friendly
10	23 July 2011	Beirut, Lebanon	Bangladesh	4–0	Win	2014 FIFA World Cup Qualification
11	11 November 2011	Kuwait City, Kuwait	Kuwait	1–0	Win	2014 FIFA World Cup Qualification
12	29 February 2012	Abu Dhabi, United Arab Emirates	United Arab Emirates	2–4	Loss	2014 FIFA World Cup Qualification

== Honours ==
Ahed

- Lebanese Premier League: 2007–08, 2009–10, 2010–11
- Lebanese FA Cup: 2008–09, 2010–11
- Lebanese Elite Cup: 2008, 2010, 2011
- Lebanese Super Cup: 2008, 2010, 2011

Individual

- Lebanese Premier League Team of the Season: 2006–07, 2007–08, 2010–11, 2011–12

== See also ==
- List of Lebanon international footballers
