= Abbas Ahmad Atwi =

Lebanese footballer (born 1979)

Abbas Atwi
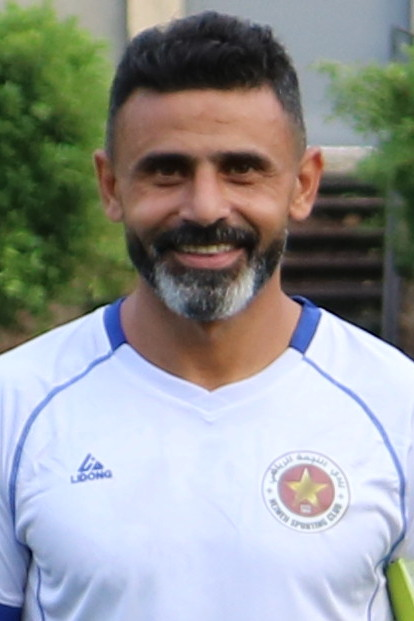
- Atwi with Nejmeh in 2020

Personal information
- Full name: Abbas Ahmad Atwi
- Date of birth: 12 September 1979 (age 47)
- Place of birth: Kunin, Lebanon
- Height: 1.75 m (5 ft 9 in)
- Position: Attacking midfielder

Senior career*
Years	Team	Apps	(Gls)
1997–2017	Nejmeh	500+	(107)
2012	→ Dubai (loan)	13	(3)
2017–2018	Al Shabab Al Arabi	9	(0)
2018–2020	Shabab Sahel	21	(5)
2020–2021	Nejmeh	11	(2)
2021–2022	Akhaa Ahli Aley	21	(0)
Total		575+	(117)

International career
2002	Lebanon U23		(1)
2002–2016	Lebanon	89	(8)

Managerial career
- 2024–2026: Nejmeh (assistant)
- * Club domestic league appearances and goals

Abbas Ahmad Atwi (Arabic: عباس أحمد عطوي; born 12 September 1979) is a Lebanese football coach and former player.

Making his debut for Lebanon in 2002, Atwi was the all-time most capped player for his country with 89 international caps, before being surpassed by Hassan Maatouk in 2020; he played for the national team for over 13 years, until his final match in 2016.

== Club career ==
Born in Kunin, in the south of Lebanon, Atwi grew up in the Zuqaq al-Blat quarter of Beirut; he began playing football in the streets aged six. Atwi joined Nejmeh on 5 December 1997, and scored 114 goals in over 500 matches in his 10-year stay. In 2012, Atwi was sent on loan for a few months to Dubai in the United Arab Emirates. Atwi terminated his contract with Nejmeh on 18 January 2017, due to problems with the technical staff.

In summer 2017 Atwi joined Shabab Arabi, before moving to Shabab Sahel on 4 January 2018, scoring four goals and making five assists in his first season. On 17 July 2020, Atwi re-joined Nejmeh on a two-year deal.

On 2 September 2021, Atwi moved to Akhaa Ahli Aley on a free transfer; aged 42, he became the oldest Lebanese player to sign for another club. According to the International Federation of Football History & Statistics (IFFHS), Atwi was the fourth-oldest player (and oldest outfield player) to play a match in the top tier of a national championship in 2022, aged 42 years, 247 days in his last Lebanese Premier League game in 2022 against Sporting on 17 May. He left Akhaa in summer 2022.

== International career ==
In 2002, Atwi played for the Lebanon Olympic team at the 2002 Asian Games, scoring a goal in an 11–0 win against Afghanistan.

Atwi made his senior debut for Lebanon in a match against Jordan in 2002, and took part in the 2006, 2010 and 2014 FIFA World Cup qualifiers. He played his last international match in 2016.

== Managerial career ==
In February 2024, Atwi returned to Nejmeh as an assistant manager to Dragan Jovanović. They eventually lead Nejmeh to win the 2023–24 Lebanese Premier League. He was released from Nejmeh's technical team ahead of the 2026–27 season.

== Personal life ==
Atwi is not related to fellow Lebanese footballer Abbas Ali Atwi, who is also known as Onika.

== Career statistics ==
=== International ===
Scores and results list Lebanon's goal tally first.

Goal	Date	Venue	Opponent	Score	Result	Competition
1.	9 April 2008	Camille Chamoun Sports City Stadium, Beirut, Lebanon	Maldives	3–0	4–0	2011 AFC Asian Cup qualification
2.	23 January 2009	Surakul Stadium, Phuket, Thailand	North Korea	0–1	0–1	2009 King's Cup
3.	25 August 2009	Ambedkar Stadium, New Delhi, India	Kyrgyzstan	0–1	1–1	2009 Nehru Cup
4.	15 November 2011	Camille Chamoun Sports City Stadium, Beirut, Lebanon	South Korea	2–1	2–1	2014 FIFA World Cup Qualification
5.	14 December 2012	Ali Al-Salem Al-Sabah Stadium, Al Farwaniyah, Kuwait	Kuwait	1–1	2–1	2012 WAFF Championship
6.	26 August 2015	Saida Municipal Stadium, Sidon, Lebanon	Iraq	1–1	2–3	Friendly
7.	8 October 2015	Suphachalasai Stadium, Bangkok, Thailand	Myanmar	0–2	0–2	2018 FIFA World Cup Qualification

== Honours ==
=== Player ===
Nejmeh

- Lebanese Premier League: 1999–2000, 2001–02, 2003–04, 2004–05, 2008–09, 2013–14
- Lebanese FA Cup: 2015–16; runner-up: 2020–21
- Lebanese Elite Cup: 1998, 2001, 2002, 2003, 2004, 2005, 2014, 2016, 2021
- Lebanese Super Cup: 2000, 2002, 2004, 2009, 2014, 2016; runner-up: 2021

Shabab Sahel

- Lebanese Elite Cup: 2019

Individual

- Lebanese Premier League Best Player: 2005–06, 2013–14
- Lebanese Premier League Team of the Season: 2001–02, 2005–06, 2006–07, 2009–10, 2013–14
- Lebanese Premier League Best Goal: 2006–07
- Lebanese Premier League top assist provider: 2006–07, 2010–11, 2012–13, 2013–14

=== Manager ===
Nejmeh (assistant manager)

- Lebanese Premier League: 2023–24

== See also ==
- List of Lebanon international footballers
