= 2009 Lebanese Elite Cup =

Lebanese Elite Cup
- Season: 2009
- Champions: Safa Sporting Club
- Matches: 9
- Goals: 27 (3 per match)

The Lebanese Elite Cup 2009 is the 12th edition of this football tournament in Lebanon. It will be held from August 29 to September 13, 2009. This tournament includes the five best teams from the 2008-09 season and the Cup Winner. Since both cup finalists, Al-Ahed and Shabab Al Sahel, finished among the first five in the league, sixth placed Al-Mabarrah qualified as well.

The draw took place on May 29, 2009, in Beirut.

== Teams ==
Club	City	2008–2009 season
Nejmeh	Beirut	Lebanese Premier League Champions
Al Ahed	Beirut	2nd in Lebanese Premier League/Cup Winners
Safa Sporting Club	Beirut	3rd in Lebanese Premier League
Al Ansar	Beirut	4th in Lebanese Premier League
Shabab Al-Sahel	Beirut	5th in the Lebanese Premier League
Al Mabarrah	Beirut	6th in Lebanese Premier League

== Group stage ==
=== Group A ===
Team	Pld	W	D	L	GF	GA	GD	Pts
(Lebanon) Safa Sporting Club	2	1	0	1	4	4	0	6
(Lebanon) Al Ahed	2	2	0	0	8	5	+3	3
(Lebanon) Nejmeh	2	0	0	2	2	5	-3	0

2009-09-05

Nejmeh	0 - 1	Safa

Rafik Hariri Stadium, Sidon

2009-09-08

Al-Ahed	4 - 2	Nejmeh
Tahmaz 25'; Akwari 30'; Maatouk 70', 82'	Report	Chahine 56'; Moghrabi 65'

Rafik Hariri Stadium, Sidon

2009-09-11

Safa	4 - 3	Al-Ahed
Kanaan 41' (o.g.); Zein Tahan 67', 90'; H. Tahan 70'	Report	Zreik 4'; El Ali 39', 45'

Bourj Hammoud Stadium, Bourj Hammoud

=== Group B ===
Team	Pld	W	D	L	GF	GA	GD	Pts
(Lebanon) Al Ansar	2	2	0	0	4	0	+4	6
(Lebanon) Al Mabarrah	2	1	0	1	0	3	-3	3
(Lebanon) Shabab Al-Sahel	2	0	0	2	0	1	-1	0

2009-09-06

Al Ansar	1 - 0	Shabab Al-Sahel

Municipal Stadium, Beirut

2009-09-08

Al Ansar	3 - 0	Al-Mabarrah

Municipal Stadium, Beirut

2009-09-12

Al-Mabarrah	1 - 0	Shabab Al-Sahel

Municipal Stadium, Beirut

== Knock-out stage ==
Semi-finals
2009-09-09 -
Safa Sporting Club	1
Al-Mabarrah	0
2009-09-10 -
Al-Ansar	0
Al Ahed	5

Final
2008-09-20 -
Safa Sporting Club	2
Al Ahed	1

=== Semi finals ===
2009-09-16

Safa Sporting Club	1 - 0	Al-Mabarrah

2009-09-17

Al-Ansar	0 - 5	Al Ahed
	Report	Zreik 15'; Maatouk 31'; Akwari 41', 64'; Tahmaz 89'

=== Final ===
2009-09-20
21:30

Safa Sporting Club	2 - 1	Al Ahed
Al Zeghbi 55'; Al Saadi 90'	Report	El Ali 54'

Bourj Hammoud Stadium, Bourj Hammoud

Lebanese Elite Cup
2009 Winners

Safa SC
1st Title
