= 2015–16 Lebanese Premier League =

Lebanese Premier League
- Season: 2015–16
- Champions: Safa
- Relegated: Hekmeh; Shabab Al-Ghazieh
- AFC Cup: Safa; Nejmeh
- Matches: 132
- Goals: 376 (2.85 per match)
- Top goalscorer: Lucas Galan (19 goals)
- Biggest home win: Ahed 9-1 Hekmeh
- Biggest away win: Shabab Al-Ghazieh 1-7 Ansar
- Highest scoring: Ahed 9-1 Hekmeh
- Highest attendance: Nejmeh vs. Ahed (10,000)
- Average attendance: 630

The 2015–16 Lebanese Premier League, officially known as the Alfa Lebanese Football League (Arabic: دوري ألفا اللبناني لكرة القدم) for sponsorship reasons, was the 55th season of top-tier football in Lebanon. A total of twelve teams competed in the league, with Al Ahed the defending champions.

== Teams ==
Tadamon Sour and Al Akhaa Al Ahli were relegated to the second level of Lebanese football after ending the 2014–15 season in the bottom two places. They were replaced by Hekmeh FC and Al Egtmaaey Tripoli who won promotion from the second tier. Six of the twelve member clubs play in the country's capital, Beirut.

=== Stadia and locations ===
Locations of teams in the 2015–16 Lebanese Premier League
Locations of teams in the 2015–16 Lebanese Premier League within Beirut

Club	Location	Stadium	Stadium capacity	Coach
Al Ahed	Beirut	Beirut Municipal Stadium	22,500	(Lebanon) Mohammad Hammoud
Al Ansar	Beirut	Beirut Municipal Stadium	22,500	(Lebanon) Jamal Taha
Al Egtmaaey Tripoli	Tripoli	Tripoli Municipal Stadium	22,000	(Lebanon) Fadi Al Omari
Al Nejmeh	Beirut	Rafic El-Hariri Stadium	5,000	(Romania) Tita Valeriu
Hekmeh	Beirut	Bourj Hammoud Stadium	8,000	(Lebanon) Fouad Hijazi
Al Nabi Sheet	Zahlé	Al-Nabi Shayth Stadium	5,000	(Lebanon) Mohammed Al-Dekka
Racing Beirut	Beirut	Bourj Hammoud Stadium	8,000	(Romania) Eugen Moldovan
Safa	Beirut	Safa Stadium	4,000	(Lebanon) Emile Rustom
Salam Zgharta	Zgharta	Zgharta Stadium	5,000	(Venezuela) Louay Salah
Shabab Al-Sahel	Beirut	Beirut Municipal Stadium	22,500	(Lebanon) Moussa Hojeij
Shabab Al-Ghazieh	Sidon	Saida Municipal Stadium	22,600	(Lebanon) Malek Hassoun
Tripoli SC	Tripoli	Tripoli Municipal Stadium	22,000	(Palestine) Ismael Qurtam

== Table ==
=== League table ===
Pos	Team	Pld	W	D	L	GF	GA	GD	Pts	Promotion, qualification or relegation
1	Safa (C)	22	16	4	2	46	18	+28	52	Qualification to 2017 AFC Cup group stage
2	Al Ahed	22	16	3	3	54	14	+40	51	Qualification to 2016–17 Arab Club Championship preliminary round 1
3	Al Nejmeh	22	13	6	3	35	19	+16	45	Qualification to 2017 AFC Cup group stage
4	Al Ansar	22	12	6	4	37	20	+17	42	
5	Shabab Al-Sahel	22	10	5	7	37	27	+10	35	
6	Al Nabi Sheet	22	9	2	11	31	30	+1	29	
7	Tripoli SC	22	7	6	9	28	31	−3	27	
8	Racing Beirut	22	7	5	10	19	27	−8	26	
9	Al Egtmaaey Tripoli	22	6	5	11	29	43	−14	23	
10	Salam Zgharta	22	4	4	14	25	44	−19	16	
11	Shabab Al-Ghazieh (R)	22	0	10	12	18	41	−23	10	Relegation to Lebanese Second Division
12	Hekmeh (R)	22	1	6	15	17	62	−45	9	Relegation to Lebanese Second Division

Updated to match(es) played on 21 May 2016. Source: FIFA
Rules for classification: 1) Points; 2) Goal difference; 3) Number of goals scored
(C) Champions; (R) Relegated

== Top goalscorers ==
Rank	Player	Club	Goals
1	(Argentina) Lucas Galán	Al Ansar	19
2	(Nigeria) Kabiru Musa	Shabab Al-Sahel	16
3	(Senegal) Mamado Drame	Al Ahed	11
4	(Lebanon) Alaa al Baba	Safa	10
4	(Uruguay) Raúl Tarragona	Salam Zgharta	10
5	(Lebanon) Hassan Chaito	Al Ahed	8
5	(Lebanon) Ahmad Zreik	Al Ahed	8
5	(Lebanon) Ali Bazzi	Al Nabi Sheet	8
5	(Romania) Octavian Draghici	Racing Beirut	8
5	(Ghana) Aboko Daved	Al Egtmaaey Tripoli	8
5	(Lebanon) Feiz Shamsin	Al Egtmaaey Tripoli	8
7	(Lebanon) Mohammad Qasas	Hekmeh	7
7	(Lebanon) Khaled Takaji	Al Nejmeh	7
6	(Ghana) Nicolas Kofi	Al Egtmaaey Tripoli	6
6	(Lebanon) Abbas Ali Atwi	Al Ahed	6
6	(Palestine) Wasim Abdelhady	Shabab Al-Sahel	6
6	(Lebanon) Ali Al Saadi	Safa	6
6	(Lebanon) Hasan Hazimeh	Safa	6
6	(Ghana) Michael Helegbe	Tripoli SC	6
6	(Lebanon) Hussain Ota	Al Nabi Sheet	6
