= Rafic Hariri Stadium =

Multi-use stadium in Beirut, Lebanon

- ملعب رفيق الحريري
- Al Manara Stadium; Nejmeh Stadium
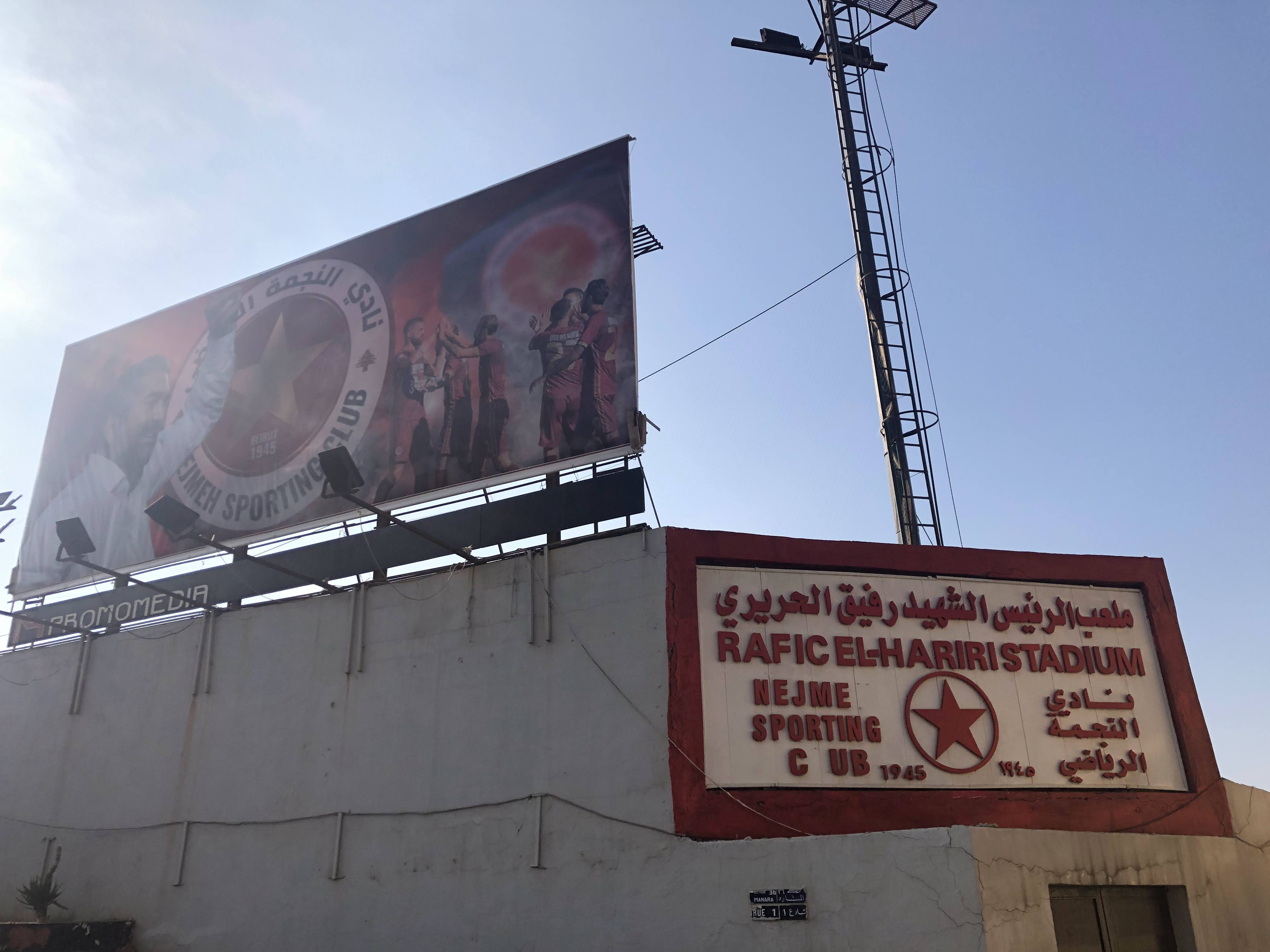
- Interactive map of Rafic Hariri Stadium
- Former names: Al Manara Stadium (1969–2005)
- Location: Beirut, Lebanon
- Coordinates: 33°53′40″N 35°28′10″E
- Owner: Nejmeh
- Operator: Nejmeh
- Capacity: 2,000
- Surface: Edel grass

Construction
- Opened: 1969
- Renovated: 2025
- Cost: LBP 2,950
- Architect: Tarek Balaa

Tenant
- Nejmeh

Rafic Hariri Stadium (Arabic: ملعب رفيق الحريري), also known as Al Manara Stadium (Arabic: ملعب المنارة) or Nejmeh Stadium (Arabic: ملعب نادي النجمه الرياضي), is a multi-use stadium in the Manara district of Beirut, Lebanon. It is currently used mostly for football matches and serves as the home for Nejmeh. The stadium has a capacity of 5,000 spectators, as well as a VIP seats area that accommodates around 100 guests, a cafeteria, and a gymnasium.

== History ==
=== The Old Stadium ===
The old club stadium consisted of a sand training field over the land number 704 in Ras Beirut area with no facilities or fences. The club teams used to practice under poor conditions. The former club administrations first built players facilities and administration offices around the stadium in 1969. The dream came true in the year 2004, and the fans can now enjoy the sight of their team training on a professional field.

=== Renaming ===
After the assassination of the Lebanese Prime Minister Rafic Hariri, Nejmeh club's board of directors decided on February 21, 2005 to call the club stadium "The Martyr Rafic Hariri Stadium" to immortalize his memory.

=== Present ===
The Club stadium is under rehabilitation. The first phase of the process started in 2003 and was completed in 2004.
