= 2011–12 Lebanese Premier League =

Lebanese Premier League
- Season: 2011–12
- Champions: Safa
- AFC Cup: Safa; Al-Ansar
- UAFA Cup: Al Nejmeh
- Matches: 264
- Goals: 343 (1.3 per match)
- Top goalscorer: (Lebanon) Mohamad Haidar (12)

The 2011–12 Lebanese Premier League was Lebanon's 51st season of top-tier football. Twelve teams competed in the league, with Al Ahed being the defending champion.

== Teams ==
Shabab Al-Ghazieh and Al Islah were relegated to the second level of Lebanese football after ending the 2010–11 season in the bottom two places. Promoted from the second level were Al-Ahli Saida and Tripoli SC

=== Stadia and locations ===
Locations of teams in the 2011–12 Lebanese Premier League

Club	Location	Stadium	Stadium capacity
Al Ahed	Beirut	Beirut Municipal Stadium	22,500
Al-Ansar	Beirut	Beirut Municipal Stadium	22,500
Tripoli SC	Tripoli	Tripoli Municipal Stadium	22,000
Al-Mabarrah	Beirut	Mabarra Stadium	5,000
Al-Nejmeh	Beirut	Rafic El-Hariri Stadium	15,000
Al-Tadamon	Tyre	Sour Stadium	6,500
Racing	Beirut	Fouad Shehab Stadium	5,000
Safa	Beirut	Safa Stadium	4,000
Shabab Al-Sahel	Beirut	Beirut Municipal Stadium	22,500
Al-Ahli Saida	Sidon	Saida Municipal Stadium	22,600
Al-Akhaa	Aley	Amin Abdelnour Stadium	3,500
Salam Sour	Tyre	Sour Stadium	6,500

=== Personnel and sponsorship ===
Team	Chairman	Head coach	Captain	Kitmaker	Shirt sponsor
Al Ahed	(Lebanon) Ousama Helbawi	(Morocco) Mohamad Al Sahel	(Lebanon) Abbas Kanaan	Lotto	Al-Manar
Al-Ansar	(Lebanon) Karim Diab	(Lebanon) Jamal Taha	(Lebanon) Sami Al Shoum	Lotto	
Tripoli SC			(Lebanon) Ibrahim Sweidan	Lotto	
Al-Mabarrah	(Lebanon) Ahmad Fadallah	(Syria) Assaf	(Lebanon) Ismail Kassem	Lotto	Bahman Hospital
Al-Nejmeh	(Lebanon) Mohammad Amin Daouk	(Lebanon) Moussa Hojeij	(Lebanon) Abbas Ahmed Atwi	Joma	Banque de la Méditerranée
Al-Tadamon	(Lebanon) Nassir Basma	(Lebanon) Mohammad Zheir	(Lebanon) Bilal Hajjo	Adidas	Yasour.org
Racing	(Lebanon) George Farah	(Trinidad and Tobago) David Nakhid	(Lebanon) Hassan Koleit	Adidas	
Safa	(Lebanon) Issam Al-Sayegh	(Iraq) Akram Ahmad Salman	(Lebanon) Khodor Salameh	Joma	Net-Gaz
Shabab Al-Sahel	(Lebanon) Samir Dbooq	(Lebanon) Hajj Hammoud	(Lebanon) Ali Mtairik	Adidas	S.G.H
Al-Ahli Saida	(Lebanon) Ahmad Harriri		(Lebanon) Ahmad Atwi	Adidas	
Al-Akhaa	(Lebanon) Ali Abdl Lateef	(Lebanon) Samir Saad	(Lebanon) Ahmad Diab	Lotto	
Salam Sour	(Lebanon) Bilal Bittar	(Lebanon) Foad Saad	(Lebanon) Ousama Haidar	Adidas	

== League table ==
Pos	Team	Pld	W	D	L	GF	GA	GD	Pts	Qualification or relegation
1	Safa	22	17	4	1	50	15	+35	55	2013 AFC Cup Group stage
2	Al Nejmeh	22	16	3	3	37	16	+21	51	
3	Al Ahed	22	14	6	2	40	17	+23	48	
4	Al Ansar	22	13	5	4	38	18	+20	44	2013 AFC Cup Group stage (Note: via 2011–12 Lebanese FA Cup)
5	Al-Akhaa Al-Ahli Aley	22	8	4	10	28	32	−4	28	
6	Shabab Al-Sahel	22	7	6	9	25	26	−1	27	
7	Tripoli SC	22	5	9	8	26	26	0	24	
8	Racing Beirut	22	5	8	9	18	25	−7	23	
9	Salam Sour	22	5	6	11	28	38	−10	21	
10	Al-Tadamon Tyre	22	3	11	8	14	26	−12	20	
11	Al-Mabarrah (R)	22	3	4	15	21	44	−23	13	Relegation to Lebanese Second Division
12	Al-Ahli Saida (R)	22	2	4	16	18	53	−35	10	Relegation to Lebanese Second Division

Updated to match(es) played on 4 May 2012. Source: FIFA
Rules for classification: 1) points; 2) goal difference; 3) number of goals scored.
(R) Relegated

== Fixtures and results ==
Home \ Away	AHD	ALS	AKA	ANS	AMB	NJM	TAD	RCB	SFA	SLS	SAS	TSC
Al Ahed			3–0	2–2		1–1	3–1	1–1	1–1	3–1	1–0	2–2
Al-Ahli Saida	0–2		1–3	1–3	0–1	0–1	1–0	1–1	0–4	3–3	1–1	2–1
Al-Akhaa Al-Ahli Aley	1–5	4–1		0–1	3–3	1–0		0–1	0–1	1–0	1–1	3–1
Al Ansar	1–0	4–2	1–2		3–2	0–0	0–1	1–0		3–1	2–3	2–0
Al-Mabarrah	1–2	4–0	2–2	0–1		2–4	0–2	1–4	1–3	3–2	0–2	1–3
Al Nejmeh	0–3	2–2	2–1	2–0	3–0		3–1	1–0	0–1	2–1	1–0	
Al-Tadamon Tyre	1–2	1–0	1–0	0–0	1–1			1–1	1–3	1–1	1–1	0–0
Racing Beirut	0–2	2–0	0–1	0–2	1–0	0–3	1–1		2–2	0–0	1–1	1–1
Safa	2–0		2–1		2–0	0–1	5–1	0–0		3–1	3–0	2–1
Salam Sour		2–1	2–2	1–3	1–0	1–2	0–0	2–2	2–3		0–2	0–0
Shabab Al-Sahel	0–2	3–1	4–1	0–1	1–1	0–2	1–0	1–1	0–2	1–3		1–3
Tripoli SC	2–2	5–2	2–1	2–2	0–0	1–2	0–0	2–0	0–0	2–3	0–1	

Updated to match(es) played on 30 April 2012. Source: FIFA
Legend: Blue = home team win; Yellow = draw; Red = away team win.
