= 2012–13 Lebanese Premier League =

Lebanese Premier League
- Season: 2012–13
- Champions: Safa Beirut SC
- Relegated: Shabab Al-Ghazieh; Salam Sour
- Matches: 264
- Top goalscorer: (Lebanon) Imad Gadar (19 goals)

The 2012–13 Lebanese Premier League is the 52nd season of top-tier football in Lebanon. A total of twelve teams are competing in the league, with Safa the defending champions. The season kicked off on 28 September and finished on 16 June 2013, longer than usual, but due to the national team getting to the 2014 FIFA World Cup qualification – AFC fourth round.

== Teams ==
Al-Mabarrah and Al-Ahli Saida were relegated to the second level of Lebanese football after ending the 2011–12 season in the bottom two places. Promoted from the second level were Shabab Al-Ghazieh, after one season away from the top flight and Al Ijtima'ih Tripoli.

=== Stadiums and locations ===
Locations of teams in the 2012–13 Lebanese Premier League

Club	Location	Stadium	Stadium capacity
Al Ahed	Beirut	Beirut Municipal Stadium	22,500
Al Akhaa Al Ahli	Aley	Amin Abdelnour Stadium	3,500
Al Ansar	Beirut	Beirut Municipal Stadium	22,500
Al Egtmaaey Tripoli	Tripoli	Tripoli Municipal Stadium	22,000
Al Nejmeh	Beirut	Rafic El-Hariri Stadium	15,000
Racing Beirut	Beirut	Fouad Shehab Stadium	5,000
Safa	Beirut	Safa Stadium	4,000
Salam Sour	Tyre	Sour Stadium	6,500
Shabab Al-Ghazieh	Sidon	Saida Municipal Stadium	22,600
Shabab Al-Sahel	Beirut	Beirut Municipal Stadium	22,500
Tadamon Sour	Tyre	Sour Stadium	6,500
Tripoli SC	Tripoli	Tripoli Municipal Stadium	22,000

== League table ==
Pos	Team	Pld	W	D	L	GF	GA	GD	Pts	Qualification
1	Safa	22	17	2	3	47	20	+27	53	2014 AFC Cup Group stage
2	Al Nejmeh	22	14	3	5	47	22	+25	45	2014 AFC Cup Group stage (Note: Since Safa qualified by winning the 2012–13 Lebanese FA Cup)
3	Racing Beirut	22	13	1	8	38	32	+6	40	
4	Al-Akhaa Al-Ahli Aley	22	11	6	5	33	22	+11	39	
5	Al Ahed	22	11	4	7	49	28	+21	37	
6	Shabab Al-Sahel	22	11	4	7	38	30	+8	37	
7	Al Ansar	22	8	8	6	35	24	+11	32	
8	Al-Tadamon Tyre	22	8	4	10	33	38	−5	28	
9	Al Egtmaaey Tripoli	22	7	5	10	36	41	−5	26	
10	Tripoli SC	22	6	6	10	27	30	−3	24	
11	Shabab Al-Ghazieh	22	3	2	17	44	67	−23	11	
12	Salam Sour	22	0	1	21	18	91	−73	1	

Updated to match(es) played on 16 June 2013. Source: FIFA
Rules for classification: 1) points; 2) goal difference; 3) number of goals scored.

== Attendances ==
#	Football club	Average attendance
1	Chabab SC Ghazieh	1,717
2	Al-Egtmaaey SC	950
3	Nejmeh SC	763
4	Tadamon Sour	700
5	Al-Ansar FC	475
6	Al-Ahed	436
7	Akhaa Ahli Aley	300
8	Safa SC	282
9	Racing Club	225
10	Tripoli SC	133
11	Shabab al-Sahel	112
12	Salam Sour	100
