= 2012–13 Lebanese FA Cup =

2012-13 Lebanese FA Cup
Tournament details
- Country: Lebanon
- Teams: 16

Final positions
- Champions: Safa Beirut SC
- Runners-up: Shabab Al-Sahel

Tournament statistics
- Matches played: 15
- Goals scored: 46 (3.07 per match)

The 2012-13 edition of the Lebanese FA Cup is the 41st edition to be played. It is the premier knockout tournament for football teams in Lebanon.

The winners qualify for the 2014 AFC Cup.

The qualifying rounds take place in late 2012 with the Premier League clubs joining at the Round of 16 in early 2013.

== Round of 16 ==
The round of 16 featured matches between the favorites, last years finalists, Nejmeh against Ansar and Safa against Al Ahed

11 January 2013

Al-Nejmah	0 – 1	Al-Ansar

11 January 2013

Al Egtmaaey Tripoli	0 – 1	Al-Akhaa Al-Ahli

11 January 2013

Racing Beirut	3 – 1	Nabi Sheet

11 January 2013

Shabab Al-Ghazieh	1 – 3	Tripoli

12 January 2013

Safa	3 – 3 3-2 pens	Al Ahed

12 January 2013

Al-Mabarrah	5 – 1	Salam Sour

12 January 2013

Harakat Al Shabab	0 – 6	Tadamon Sour

12 January 2013

Shabab Al-Sahel	3 – 0	Al Khoyol Beirut

== Quarter finals ==
6 April 2013

Al-Akhaa Al-Ahli	0 – 0 (pen 4-3)	Racing Beirut

6 April 2013

Tripoli	0 – 0 (pen 4-5)	Shabab Al-Sahel

6 April 2013

Safa	1 – 0	Al-Mabarrah

6 April 2013

Al-Ansar	1 – 3	Tadamon Sour

== Semi finals ==
15 May 2013

Tadamon Sour	0 – 2	Safa

15 May 2013

Al-Akhaa Al-Ahli	2 – 3	Shabab Al-Sahel

== Final ==
22 June 2013

Shabab Al-Sahel	1 – 2	Safa
