= 2014 AFC Cup final =

- Event: 2014 AFC Cup
| Erbil | Al-Qadsia |
| (Iraq) | (Kuwait) |
| 0 | 0 |
- after extra time Al-Qadsia won 4–2 on penalties
- Date: 18 October 2014
- Venue: Maktoum Bin Rashid Al Maktoum Stadium, Dubai
- Man of the Match: Saif Al Hashan
- Referee: Kim Dong-jin (South Korea)
- Attendance: 5,240

The 2014 AFC Cup final was the final of the 2014 AFC Cup, the 11th edition of the AFC Cup, a football competition organized by the Asian Football Confederation (AFC) for clubs from "developing countries" in Asia.

The final was contested as a single match between Iraqi team Erbil and Kuwaiti team Al-Qadsia. The match was hosted by Erbil at the Maktoum Bin Rashid Al Maktoum Stadium in Dubai on 18 October 2014, as teams from Iraq were not allowed to host their home matches in their country due to security concerns.

Al-Qadsia defeated Erbil 4–2 on penalties after a 0–0 draw, to win their first AFC Cup title after losing in the previous year's final.

== Venue ==
The Maktoum Bin Rashid Al Maktoum Stadium is a multi-use stadium in Dubai, United Arab Emirates. It is the home stadium of Al-Shabab and holds 18,000 spectators.

== Background ==
Erbil qualified for the 2014 AFC Cup group stage as the 2012–13 Iraqi Elite League runners-up. This was their fifth appearance in the AFC Cup.

Al-Qadsia qualified for the 2014 AFC Champions League qualifying play-off as the 2012–13 Kuwaiti Premier League runners-up and the 2013 AFC Cup runners-up, but failed to advance to the AFC Champions League group stage, and entered the AFC Cup group stage. This was their fifth appearance in the AFC Cup.

Both teams had reached the AFC Cup final before but neither has won the title. Erbil lost to Al-Kuwait in 2012, while Al-Qadsia lost to Al-Ittihad in 2010 and to Al-Kuwait in 2013.

Since 2009 when Kuwaiti clubs first entered the AFC Cup, this was the sixth straight single-match final that feature a team from Kuwait.

== Road to final ==
Note: In all results below, the score of the finalist is given first (H: home; A: away).

| (Iraq) Erbil | | | | Round | (Kuwait) Al-Qadsia | | | |
|---|---|---|---|---|---|---|---|---|
| AFC Cup | | | | Qualifying play-off | AFC Champions League | | | |
| Opponent | Result | | | Qualifying play-off | Opponent | Result | | |
| Bye | | | | Round 1 | (Oman) Al-Suwaiq | 1–0 (A) | | |
| Bye | | | | Round 2 | (United Arab Emirates) Baniyas | 4–0 (A) | | |
| Bye | | | | Round 3 | (Qatar) El Jaish | 0–3 (A) | | |
AFC Cup
| Opponent | Result | | | Group stage | Opponent | Result | | |
| (Jordan) Shabab Al-Ordon | 3–1 (A) | | | Matchday 1 | (Iraq) Al-Shorta | 0–0 (A) | | |
| (Kyrgyzstan) Alay Osh | 6–0 (H) | | | Matchday 2 | (Bahrain) Al-Hidd | 2–0 (H) | | |
| (Bahrain) Riffa | 1–2 (H) | | | Matchday 3 | (Syria) Al-Wahda | 3–1 (A) | | |
| (Bahrain) Riffa | 3–0 (A) | | | Matchday 4 | (Syria) Al-Wahda | 1–1 (H) | | |
| (Jordan) Shabab Al-Ordon | 3–2 (H) | | | Matchday 5 | (Iraq) Al-Shorta | 3–0 (H) | | |
| (Kyrgyzstan) Alay Osh | 3–0 (A) | | | Matchday 6 | (Bahrain) Al-Hidd | 2–3 (A) | | |
| Group D winner: Team / Pld / W / D / L / GF / GA / GD / Pts; (Iraq) Erbil / 6 / 5 / 0 / 1 / 19 / 5 / +14 / 15; (Bahrain) Riffa / 6 / 3 / 1 / 2 / 7 / 7 / 0 / 10; (Jordan) Shabab Al-Ordon / 6 / 3 / 0 / 3 / 9 / 10 / −1 / 9; (Kyrgyzstan) Alay Osh / 6 / 0 / 1 / 5 / 1 / 14 / −13 / 1; Source: | | | | Final standings | Group C winner: Team / Pld / W / D / L / GF / GA / GD / Pts; (Kuwait) Al-Qadsia / 6 / 3 / 2 / 1 / 11 / 5 / +6 / 11 (Note: Tiebreakers: Al-Qadsia and Al-Hidd are ranked on head-to-head record.); (Bahrain) Al-Hidd / 6 / 3 / 2 / 1 / 10 / 6 / +4 / 11; (Iraq) Al-Shorta / 6 / 1 / 4 / 1 / 3 / 4 / −1 / 7; (Syria) Al-Wahda / 6 / 0 / 2 / 4 / 5 / 14 / −9 / 2; Source: Notes: | | | |
| Opponent | Agg. | 1st leg | 2nd leg | Knock-out stage | Opponent | Agg. | 1st leg | 2nd leg |
| (Lebanon) Al-Nejmeh | 0–0 (a.e.t.) (3–0 p) (H) (single match) | | | Round of 16 | (Jordan) That Ras | 4–0 (H) (single match) | | |
| (Vietnam) Hà Nội T&T | 3–0 | 1–0 (A) | 2–0 (H) | Quarter-finals | (Bahrain) Al-Hidd | 3–3 (a) | 1–1 (H) | 2–2 (A) |
| (Hong Kong) Kitchee | 3–2 | 1–1 (H) | 2–1 (A) | Semi-finals | (Indonesia) Persipura Jayapura | 10–2 | 4–2 (H) | 6–0 (A) |

== Rules ==
The final was played as a single match, with the host team decided by draw. If tied after regulation, extra time and, if necessary, penalty shoot-out were used to decide the winner.

== Match ==
18 October 2014
20:00 UTC+4

| Erbil (Iraq) | 0–0 (a.e.t.) | (Kuwait) Al-Qadsia |
|---|---|---|
| | Report |
Penalties
| Radhi (penalty scored); Hawar (penalty missed); Barzan (penalty scored); Faez (penalty missed) | 2–4 | (penalty scored) Al-Mutawa; (penalty missed) Said; (penalty scored) Al Ansari; (penalty scored) El Ebrahim; (penalty scored) Subotić |

Maktoum Bin Rashid Al Maktoum Stadium, Dubai
Attendance: 5,240
Referee: Kim Dong-jin (South Korea)

| Erbil | Al-Qadsia |

| GK | 12 | (Iraq) Jalal Hasan |
| DF | 3 | (Iraq) Herdi Siamand | (yellow card) 120' |
| DF | 5 | (Iraq) Ali Faez Atia |
| DF | 13 | (Iraq) Ahmed Mohammed Hussein |
| DF | 32 | (Iraq) Nadim Sabagh |
| MF | 7 | (Iraq) Halgurd Mulla Mohammed | | (substituted off) 113' |
| MF | 16 | (Iraq) Miran Khesro |
| MF | 17 | (Iraq) Nabeel Sabah | | (substituted off) 90' |
| MF | 30 | (Argentina) Víctor Ormazábal |
| FW | 10 | (Iraq) Amjad Radhi |
| FW | 11 | (Iraq) Luay Salah (c) | (yellow card) 89' | (substituted off) 106' |
Substitutes
| GK | 21 | (Iraq) Sarhang Muhsin |
| DF | 2 | (Iraq) Burhan Jumaah |
| DF | 23 | (Iraq) Kosrat Baiz Ali |
| MF | 9 | (Iraq) Hawar Mulla Mohammed | | (substituted on) 106' |
| MF | 20 | (Iraq) Mohammed Khalid Jaffal Al-Jumaili |
| MF | 29 | (Iraq) Barzan Sherzad | | (substituted on) 113' |
| MF | 36 | (Iraq) Hatem Zaidan | | (substituted on) 90' |
Manager
(Iraq) Ayoub Odisho

| GK | 22 | (Kuwait) Nawaf Al Khaldi |
| DF | 6 | (Kuwait) Khaled Al Qahtani | (yellow card) 86' |
| DF | 18 | (Kuwait) Amer Al Fadhel | | (substituted off) 91' |
| DF | 27 | (Philippines) Álvaro Silva |
| MF | 8 | (Kuwait) Saleh Al Sheikh (c) |
| MF | 10 | (Kuwait) Saif Al Hashan | | (substituted off) 107' |
| MF | 11 | (Kuwait) Fahad Al Ansari | (yellow card) 101' |
| FW | 14 | (Kuwait) Talal Al Amer | | (substituted off) 75' |
| FW | 17 | (Kuwait) Bader Al-Mutawa | (yellow card) 120' |
| FW | 31 | (Switzerland) Danijel Subotić |
| FW | 36 | (Kuwait) Khalid El Ebrahim |
Substitutes
| GK | 23 | (Kuwait) Ahmed Al Fahdli |
| MF | 4 | (Nigeria) Shehu Abdullahi |
| MF | 7 | (Kuwait) Hamad Aman | | (substituted on) 107' |
| MF | 34 | (Kuwait) Ahmad Al Dhefiri |
| FW | 12 | (Kuwait) Sultan Al Enezi | | (substituted on) 75' |
| FW | 15 | (Kuwait) Soud Al Mejmed |
| FW | 25 | (Kuwait) Dhari Said | | (substituted on) 91' |
Manager
(Spain) Antonio Puche

AFC Man of the Match:
(Kuwait) Saif Al Hashan (Al-Qadsia)

Assistant referees:
Kim Young-ah (South Korea)
Yoon Kwang-Yeol (South Korea)
Fourth official:
Kim Sang-woo (South Korea)
