= Iraqi football clubs in Asian competitions =

Iraqi clubs in the AFC Club Competitions. From its introduction in 2002 until the forming of the AFC Professional League in 2009, Iraqi clubs were allowed to enter the AFC Champions League (ACL). Despite reaching respectable results, none of the Iraqi teams managed to get further than the group stage.

Since Iraq did not meet the new AFC standards for the ACL, its clubs participated in the AFC Cup from 2009 until 2018 (however, the AFC gave Iraq one qualifying spot for the ACL for the 2014 edition only). Al-Quwa Al-Jawiya won the AFC Cup three times, in 2016, 2017 and 2018. Iraqi clubs returned to the ACL group stage in 2019.

== List of finals ==
Year	Competition	Iraqi team	Opposing team	Score	Venue
1971	Asian Champion Club Tournament	Aliyat Al-Shorta	(Israel) Maccabi Tel Aviv	w/o^{1}	(Thailand) National Stadium, Bangkok
1989	Asian Club Championship	Al-Rasheed	(Qatar) Al-Sadd	3–2	(Iraq) Al-Shaab Stadium, Baghdad
1989	Asian Club Championship	Al-Rasheed	(Qatar) Al-Sadd	0–1 (3–3 agg.)^{2}	(Qatar) Jassim bin Hamad Stadium, Doha
1995	Asian Cup Winners' Cup	Al-Talaba	(Japan) Bellmare Hiratsuka	1–2	(Japan) Mitsuzawa Stadium, Yokohama
2000	Asian Cup Winners' Cup	Al-Zawraa	(Japan) Shimizu S-Pulse	0–1	Chiang Mai, Thailand
2012	AFC Cup	Erbil	Al-Kuwait	0–4	(Iraq) Franso Hariri Stadium, Erbil
2014	AFC Cup	Erbil	(Kuwait) Al-Qadsia	0–0 (a.e.t.) (2–4 p)	(United Arab Emirates) Maktoum Bin Rashid Al Maktoum Stadium, Dubai
2016	AFC Cup	Al-Quwa Al-Jawiya	(India) Bengaluru FC	1–0	(Qatar) Suheim Bin Hamad Stadium, Doha
2017	AFC Cup	Al-Quwa Al-Jawiya	(Tajikistan) Istiklol	1–0	(Tajikistan) Hisor Central Stadium, Hisor
2018	AFC Cup	Al-Quwa Al-Jawiya	(Turkmenistan) Altyn Asyr	2–0	(Iraq) Basra International Stadium, Basra

^{1} Aliyat Al-Shorta refused to play for political reasons.
^{2} Al-Sadd won on the away goals rule.

== List of participations ==
=== AFC Champions League Elite ===
==== 1971–2002 ====
Participations in the Asian Club Championship
Team	1971	1985	1986	1987	1989	1990	1991	1995	1997	1998	1999	2000	2001	2002	Total
(Iraq) Al-Zawraa								R2	4th	R2			R1	R2	5
(Iraq) Al-Rasheed		QR2		GS	RU	GS	QR1								5
(Iraq) Al-Shorta												QF			1
(Iraq) Al-Quwa Al-Jawiya											R2				1
(Iraq) Al-Talaba			4th												1
(Iraq) Aliyat Al-Shorta	RU														1
Total	1	1	1	1	1	1	1	1	1	1	1	1	1	1	14

==== 2002–present ====
Participations in the AFC Champions League Elite
Team	2003	2004	2005	2006	2007	2008	2014	2019	2020	2021	2022	2024	2025	2026	2027	Total
(Iraq) Al-Quwa Al-Jawiya		GS		GS		GS		QR2		GS	GS	GS			q	8
(Iraq) Al-Shorta		GS	GS				QR1		GS	GS			LS	LS		7
(Iraq) Al-Zawraa	QR3		GS		GS			GS	QR2	PO	PO					7
(Iraq) Erbil						GS										1
(Iraq) Al-Najaf					GS											1
(Iraq) Al-Minaa				GS												1
(Iraq) Al-Talaba	GS															1
Total	2	2	2	2	2	2	1	2	2	3	2	1	1	1	1	26

=== AFC Champions League Two ===
Participations in the AFC Champions League Two
Team	2009	2011	2012	2013	2014	2015	2016	2017	2018	2024	2025	2026	2027	Total
(Iraq) Al-Zawraa	R16		R16					ZSF	GS	GS		R16		6
(Iraq) Erbil	QF	SF	RU	R16	RU	GS								6
(Iraq) Al-Quwa Al-Jawiya							W	W	W		GS			4
(Iraq) Al-Shorta					GS	R16							q	3
(Iraq) Duhok		QF		R16										2
(Iraq) Al-Kahrabaa										ZSF				1
(Iraq) Naft Al-Wasat							R16							1
(Iraq) Al-Talaba		GS												1
Total	2	3	2	2	2	2	2	2	2	2	1	1	1	24

=== Asian Cup Winners' Cup ===
Participations in the Asian Cup Winners' Cup
Team	1994	1996	1997	1998	1999	2000	2001	2002	Total
(Iraq) Al-Talaba		RU			4th		R1		3
(Iraq) Al-Quwa Al-Jawiya			R1					R1	2
(Iraq) Al-Zawraa	R1					RU			2
(Iraq) Al-Shorta				QF					1
Total	1	1	1	1	1	1	1	1	8

=== Best performance by club ===
Club	AFC Champions League Elite / Asian Club Championship	AFC Champions League Two / AFC Cup	Asian Cup Winners' Cup
Aliyat Al-Shorta	Runners-up; 1971	–	–
Al-Kahrabaa	–	Zonal semi-finals 2023–24	–
Al-Minaa	Group stage 2006	–	–
Al-Najaf	Group stage 2007	–	–
Al-Quwa Al-Jawiya	Round of 16; 1998–99	Winners (3); 2016, 2017, 2018	First round (2); 1996–97, 2001–02
Al-Rasheed	Runners-up; 1988–89	–	–
Al-Shorta	Quarter-finals; 1999–2000	Round of 16; 2015	Quarter-finals; 1997–98
Al-Talaba	Fourth place 1986	Group stage 2011	Runners-up; 1995–96
Al-Zawraa	Fourth place 1996–97	Zonal semi-finals 2017	Runners-up; 1999–2000
Duhok	–	Quarter-finals; 2011	–
Erbil	Group stage 2008	Runners-up (2); 2012, 2014	–
Naft Al-Wasat	–	Round of 16; 2016	–

== List of matches ==
=== 2002–present ===
==== Al-Kahrabaa ====
Al-Kahrabaa Statistics
Team	Pld	W	D	L	GF	GA	GD
(Iraq) Al-Kahrabaa	8	5	1	2	11	6	+5

Al-Kahrabaa results
Season	Round	Result	Opponent	Venue
2023–24 AFC Cup	Group stage			
2023–24 AFC Cup	Group stage	0–0	Al-Kuwait	Basra, Iraq
2023–24 AFC Cup	Group stage	2–0	(Syria) Al-Ittihad	Mecca, KSA
2023–24 AFC Cup	Group stage	1–3	(Jordan) Al-Wehdat	Amman, Jordan
2023–24 AFC Cup	Group stage	3–1	(Jordan) Al-Wehdat	Basra, Iraq
2023–24 AFC Cup	Group stage	1–0	Al-Kuwait	Kuwait City, Kuwait
2023–24 AFC Cup	Group stage	3–1	(Syria) Al-Ittihad	Basra, Iraq
2023–24 AFC Cup	Zonal semi-finals			
2023–24 AFC Cup	Zonal semi-finals	1–0	(Lebanon) Al-Ahed	Muscat, Oman
2023–24 AFC Cup	Zonal semi-finals	0–1 (a.e.t.); 2–4 (p)	(Lebanon) Al-Ahed	Basra, Iraq

==== Al-Minaa ====
Al-Minaa Statistics
Team	Pld	W	D	L	GF	GA	GD
(Iraq) Al-Minaa	6	0	2	4	6	11	−5

Al-Minaa results
Season	Round	Result	Opponent	Venue
2006 AFC Champions League	Group stage			
2006 AFC Champions League	Group stage	0–1	(Uzbekistan) Mash'al Mubarek	Kuwait City, Kuwait
2006 AFC Champions League	Group stage	1–3	(Saudi Arabia) Al-Hilal	Riyadh, KSA
2006 AFC Champions League	Group stage	1–2	(United Arab Emirates) Al-Ain	Al Ain, UAE
2006 AFC Champions League	Group stage	1–2	(United Arab Emirates) Al-Ain	Hawally, Kuwait
2006 AFC Champions League	Group stage	2–2	(Uzbekistan) Mash'al Mubarek	Karshi, Uzbekistan
2006 AFC Champions League	Group stage	1–1	(Saudi Arabia) Al-Hilal	Kuwait City, Kuwait

==== Al-Najaf ====
Al-Najaf Statistics
Team	Pld	W	D	L	GF	GA	GD
(Iraq) Al-Najaf	6	2	2	2	9	8	+1

Al-Najaf results
Season	Round	Result	Opponent	Venue
2007 AFC Champions League	Group stage			
2007 AFC Champions League	Group stage	0–1	(Uzbekistan) Neftchi Farg'ona	Kuwait City, Kuwait
2007 AFC Champions League	Group stage	4–1	(Qatar) Al-Sadd	Doha, Qatar
2007 AFC Champions League	Group stage	1–1	(Syria) Al-Karamah	Homs, Syria
2007 AFC Champions League	Group stage	2–4	(Syria) Al-Karamah	Kuwait City, Kuwait
2007 AFC Champions League	Group stage	1–1	(Uzbekistan) Neftchi Farg'ona	Farg'ona, Uzbekistan
2007 AFC Champions League	Group stage	1–0	(Qatar) Al-Sadd	Kuwait City, Kuwait

==== Al-Quwa Al-Jawiya ====
Al-Quwa Al-Jawiya Statistics
Team	Pld	W	D	L	GF	GA	GD
(Iraq) Al-Quwa Al-Jawiya	80	36	18	26	105	91	+14

Al-Quwa Al-Jawiya results
Season	Round	Result	Opponent	Venue
2004 AFC Champions League	Group stage			
2004 AFC Champions League	Group stage	0–1 (Note: Al-Qadsia's results in the competition were later expunged.)	(Kuwait) Al-Qadsia	Damascus, Syria
2004 AFC Champions League	Group stage	0–1	(Qatar) Al-Sadd	Doha, Qatar
2004 AFC Champions League	Group stage	0–3	(United Arab Emirates) Al-Wahda	Abu Dhabi, UAE
2004 AFC Champions League	Group stage	0–0	(United Arab Emirates) Al-Wahda	Damascus, Syria
2004 AFC Champions League	Group stage	0–1	(Kuwait) Al-Qadsia	Kuwait City, Kuwait
2004 AFC Champions League	Group stage	1–0	(Qatar) Al-Sadd	Damascus, Syria
2006 AFC Champions League	Group stage			
2006 AFC Champions League	Group stage	1–0	(Kuwait) Al Arabi	Kuwait City, Kuwait
2006 AFC Champions League	Group stage	0–2	(Saudi Arabia) Al-Shabab	Tripoli, Lebanon
2006 AFC Champions League	Group stage	0–2	(Qatar) Al-Sadd	Tripoli, Lebanon
2006 AFC Champions League	Group stage	0–3	(Qatar) Al-Sadd	Doha, Qatar
2006 AFC Champions League	Group stage	3–0	(Kuwait) Al Arabi	Tripoli, Lebanon
2006 AFC Champions League	Group stage	1–2	(Saudi Arabia) Al-Shabab	Riyadh, KSA
2008 AFC Champions League	Group stage			
2008 AFC Champions League	Group stage	1–0	(United Arab Emirates) Al-Wasl	Dubai, UAE
2008 AFC Champions League	Group stage	0–0	Al-Kuwait	Kuwait City, Kuwait
2008 AFC Champions League	Group stage	0–1	(Iran) Saipa	Kuwait City, Kuwait
2008 AFC Champions League	Group stage	1–1	(Iran) Saipa	Tehran, Iran
2008 AFC Champions League	Group stage	1–2	(United Arab Emirates) Al-Wasl	Kuwait City, Kuwait
2008 AFC Champions League	Group stage	2–1	Al-Kuwait	Kuwait City, Kuwait
2016 AFC Cup	Group stage			
2016 AFC Cup	Group stage	2–0	(Palestine) Shabab Al-Dhahiriya	Hebron, Palestine
2016 AFC Cup	Group stage	2–1	(Oman) Al-Oruba	Wakra, Qatar
2016 AFC Cup	Group stage	2–5	(Syria) Al-Wahda	Saida, Lebanon
2016 AFC Cup	Group stage	1–0	(Syria) Al-Wahda	Wakra, Qatar
2016 AFC Cup	Group stage	4–1	(Palestine) Shabab Al-Dhahiriya	Wakra, Qatar
2016 AFC Cup	Group stage	4–0	(Oman) Al-Oruba	Seeb, Oman
2016 AFC Cup	Round of 16			
2016 AFC Cup	Round of 16	2–1	(Jordan) Al-Wehdat	Wakra, Qatar
2016 AFC Cup	Quarterfinals			
2016 AFC Cup	Quarterfinals	1–1	(Syria) Al-Jaish	Wakra, Qatar
2016 AFC Cup	Quarterfinals	4–0	(Syria) Al-Jaish	Wakra, Qatar
2016 AFC Cup	Semifinals			
2016 AFC Cup	Semifinals	1–1	(Lebanon) Al-Ahed	Wakra, Qatar
2016 AFC Cup	Semifinals	4–3	(Lebanon) Al-Ahed	Beirut, Lebanon
2016 AFC Cup	Final			
2016 AFC Cup	Final	1–0	(India) Bengaluru	Doha, Qatar
2017 AFC Cup	Group stage			
2017 AFC Cup	Group stage	0–0	(Lebanon) Safa	Beirut, Lebanon
2017 AFC Cup	Group stage	2–1	(Bahrain) Al-Hidd	Doha, Qatar
2017 AFC Cup	Group stage	0–0	(Syria) Al-Wahda	Beirut, Lebanon
2017 AFC Cup	Group stage	1–1	(Syria) Al-Wahda	Doha, Qatar
2017 AFC Cup	Group stage	2–0	(Lebanon) Safa	Doha, Qatar
2017 AFC Cup	Group stage	1–0	(Bahrain) Al-Hidd	Manama, Bahrain
2017 AFC Cup	Zonal semi-finals			
2017 AFC Cup	Zonal semi-finals	1–1	(Iraq) Al-Zawraa	Erbil, Iraq
2017 AFC Cup	Zonal semi-finals	1–0	(Iraq) Al-Zawraa	Doha, Qatar
2017 AFC Cup	Zonal finals			
2017 AFC Cup	Zonal finals	1–2	(Syria) Al-Wahda	Sidon, Lebanon
2017 AFC Cup	Zonal finals	1–0	(Syria) Al-Wahda	Wakra, Qatar
2017 AFC Cup	Final			
2017 AFC Cup	Final	1–0	(Tajikistan) Istiklol	Dushanbe, Tajikistan
2018 AFC Cup	Group stage			
2018 AFC Cup	Group stage	2–2	(Jordan) Al-Jazeera	Wakra, Qatar
2018 AFC Cup	Group stage	1–0	(Oman) Al-Suwaiq	Seeb, Oman
2018 AFC Cup	Group stage	4–3	(Bahrain) Malkiya	Isa Town, Bahrain
2018 AFC Cup	Group stage	1–1	(Jordan) Al-Jazeera	Amman, Jordan
2018 AFC Cup	Group stage	1–1	(Bahrain) Malkiya	Karbala, Iraq
2018 AFC Cup	Group stage	2–0	(Oman) Al-Suwaiq	Karbala, Iraq
2018 AFC Cup	Zonal semi-finals			
2018 AFC Cup	Zonal semi-finals	3–1	(Lebanon) Al-Ahed	Karbala, Iraq
2018 AFC Cup	Zonal semi-finals	2–2	(Lebanon) Al-Ahed	Beirut, Lebanon
2018 AFC Cup	Zonal finals			
2018 AFC Cup	Zonal finals	1–0	(Jordan) Al-Jazeera	Amman, Jordan
2018 AFC Cup	Zonal finals	3–1	(Jordan) Al-Jazeera	Karbala, Iraq
2018 AFC Cup	Final			
2018 AFC Cup	Final	2–0	(Turkmenistan) Altyn Asyr	Basra, Iraq
2019 AFC Champions League	Qualifying play-off			
2019 AFC Champions League	Qualifying play-off	1–2	(Uzbekistan) Pakhtakor	Tashkent, Uzbekistan
2021 AFC Champions League	Qualifying play-off			
2021 AFC Champions League	Qualifying play-off	1–1 (a.e.t.); 3–2 (p)	(Saudi Arabia) Al-Wehda	Mecca, Saudi Arabia
2021 AFC Champions League	Group stage			
2021 AFC Champions League	Group stage	0–1	(United Arab Emirates) Sharjah	Sharjah, UAE
2021 AFC Champions League	Group stage	0–0	(Uzbekistan) Pakhtakor	Sharjah, UAE
2021 AFC Champions League	Group stage	0–0	(Iran) Tractor	Sharjah, UAE
2021 AFC Champions League	Group stage	0–1	(Iran) Tractor	Sharjah, UAE
2021 AFC Champions League	Group stage	2–3	(United Arab Emirates) Sharjah	Sharjah, UAE
2021 AFC Champions League	Group stage	0–1	(Uzbekistan) Pakhtakor	Sharjah, UAE
2022 AFC Champions League	Group stage			
2022 AFC Champions League	Group stage	2–1	(United Arab Emirates) Al-Jazira	Riyadh, KSA
2022 AFC Champions League	Group stage	1–2	(India) Mumbai City	Riyadh, KSA
2022 AFC Champions League	Group stage	1–1	(Saudi Arabia) Al-Shabab	Riyadh, KSA
2022 AFC Champions League	Group stage	0–3	(Saudi Arabia) Al-Shabab	Riyadh, KSA
2022 AFC Champions League	Group stage	3–2	(United Arab Emirates) Al-Jazira	Riyadh, KSA
2022 AFC Champions League	Group stage	0–1	(India) Mumbai City	Riyadh, KSA
2023–24 AFC Champions League	Group stage			
2023–24 AFC Champions League	Group stage	2–2	(Iran) Sepahan	Erbil, Iraq
2023–24 AFC Champions League	Group stage	2–1	(Uzbekistan) AGMK	Olmaliq, Tashkent
2023–24 AFC Champions League	Group stage	0–1	(Saudi Arabia) Al-Ittihad	Jeddah, KSA
2023–24 AFC Champions League	Group stage	2–0	(Saudi Arabia) Al-Ittihad	Erbil, Iraq
2023–24 AFC Champions League	Group stage	0–1	(Iran) Sepahan	Isfahan, Iran
2023–24 AFC Champions League	Group stage	3–2	(Uzbekistan) AGMK	Erbil, Iraq
2024–25 AFC Champions League Two	Group stage			
2024–25 AFC Champions League Two	Group stage	2–1	(Turkmenistan) Altyn Asyr	Baghdad, Iraq
2024–25 AFC Champions League Two	Group stage	2–1	(Saudi Arabia) Al-Taawon	Buraidah, KSA
2024–25 AFC Champions League Two	Group stage	1–2	(Bahrain) Al-Khaldiya	Baghdad, Iraq
2024–25 AFC Champions League Two	Group stage	1–4	(Bahrain) Al-Khaldiya	Riffa, Bahrain
2024–25 AFC Champions League Two	Group stage	2–0	(Turkmenistan) Altyn Asyr	Ashgabat, Turkmenistan
2024–25 AFC Champions League Two	Group stage	0–1	(Saudi Arabia) Al-Taawon	Baghdad, Iraq
2026–27 AFC Champions League Elite	League stage			
2026–27 AFC Champions League Elite	League stage	0–1	(Uzbekistan) Neftchi	Fergana, Uzbekistan
2026–27 AFC Champions League Elite	League stage	1–4	(United Arab Emirates) Al Ain	Basra, Iraq
2026–27 AFC Champions League Elite	League stage	1–0	(Uzbekistan) Pakhtakor	Baghdad, Iraq
2026–27 AFC Champions League Elite	League stage	3–4	(United Arab Emirates) Al Wasl	Dubai, UAE
2026–27 AFC Champions League Elite	League stage		(Qatar) Al-Gharafa	Basra, Iraq
2026–27 AFC Champions League Elite	League stage		(Qatar) Al Sadd	Al Rayyan, Qatar
2026–27 AFC Champions League Elite	League stage		(United Arab Emirates) Shabab Al Ahli	Basra, Iraq
2026–27 AFC Champions League Elite	League stage		(Qatar) Al-Shamal	Al Khor, Qatar

==== Al-Shorta ====
Al-Shorta Statistics
Team	Pld	W	D	L	GF	GA	GD
(Iraq) Al-Shorta	54	10	17	27	50	87	−37

Al-Shorta results
Season	Round	Result	Opponent	Venue
2004 AFC Champions League	Group stage			
2004 AFC Champions League	Group stage	0–2	(United Arab Emirates) Sharjah	Sharjah, UAE
2004 AFC Champions League	Group stage	1–2	(Saudi Arabia) Al-Hilal	Damascus, Syria
2004 AFC Champions League	Group stage	0–2	(Saudi Arabia) Al-Hilal	Riyadh, KSA
2004 AFC Champions League	Group stage	2–3	(United Arab Emirates) Sharjah	Damascus, Syria
2005 AFC Champions League	Group stage			
2005 AFC Champions League	Group stage	1–3	(Kuwait) Al-Salmiya	Salmiya, Kuwait
2005 AFC Champions League	Group stage	1–1	(Iran) PAS	Zarqa, Jordan
2005 AFC Champions League	Group stage	0–2	(Qatar) Al-Rayyan	Doha, Qatar
2005 AFC Champions League	Group stage	0–0	(Qatar) Al-Rayyan	Amman, Jordan
2005 AFC Champions League	Group stage	0–1	(Kuwait) Al-Salmiya	Amman, Jordan
2005 AFC Champions League	Group stage	0–1	(Iran) PAS	Tehran, Iran
2014 AFC Champions League	Qualifying play-off			
2014 AFC Champions League	Qualifying play-off	0–1	Al-Kuwait	Kuwait City, Kuwait
2014 AFC Cup	Group stage			
2014 AFC Cup	Group stage	0–0	(Kuwait) Al-Qadsia	Wakra, Qatar
2014 AFC Cup	Group stage	3–1	(Syria) Al-Wahda	Sidon, Lebanon
2014 AFC Cup	Group stage	0–0	(Bahrain) Al-Hidd	Riffa, Bahrain
2014 AFC Cup	Group stage	0–0	(Bahrain) Al-Hidd	Wakra, Qatar
2014 AFC Cup	Group stage	0–3	(Kuwait) Al-Qadsia	Kuwait City, Kuwait
2014 AFC Cup	Group stage	0–0	(Syria) Al-Wahda	Wakra, Qatar
2015 AFC Cup	Group stage			
2015 AFC Cup	Group stage	2–2	(Bahrain) Al-Hidd	Doha, Qatar
2015 AFC Cup	Group stage	1–1	(Jordan) Al-Jazeera	Amman, Jordan
2015 AFC Cup	Group stage	6–2	(Palestine) Taraji Wadi Al-Nes	Doha, Qatar
2015 AFC Cup	Group stage	0–1	(Palestine) Taraji Wadi Al-Nes	Al-Ram, Palestine
2015 AFC Cup	Group stage	1–1	(Bahrain) Al-Hidd	Riffa, Bahrain
2015 AFC Cup	Group stage	4–0	(Jordan) Al-Jazeera	Doha, Qatar
2015 AFC Cup	Round of 16			
2015 AFC Cup	Round of 16	0–2	Al-Kuwait	Doha, Qatar
2020 AFC Champions League	Group stage			
2020 AFC Champions League	Group stage	1–1	(Iran) Esteghlal	Erbil, Iraq
2020 AFC Champions League	Group stage	0–1 (Note: Al-Wahda's results in the competition were later expunged.)	(United Arab Emirates) Al-Wahda	Erbil, Iraq
2020 AFC Champions League	Group stage	0–1	(Saudi Arabia) Al-Ahli	Doha, Qatar
2020 AFC Champions League	Group stage	2–1	(Saudi Arabia) Al-Ahli	Doha, Qatar
2020 AFC Champions League	Group stage	1–1	(Iran) Esteghlal	Doha, Qatar
2021 AFC Champions League	Group stage			
2021 AFC Champions League	Group stage	0–2	(Qatar) Al-Duhail	Jeddah, KSA
2021 AFC Champions League	Group stage	0–3	(Iran) Esteghlal	Jeddah, KSA
2021 AFC Champions League	Group stage	0–3	(Saudi Arabia) Al-Ahli	Jeddah, KSA
2021 AFC Champions League	Group stage	1–2	(Saudi Arabia) Al-Ahli	Jeddah, KSA
2021 AFC Champions League	Group stage	2–1	(Qatar) Al-Duhail	Jeddah, KSA
2021 AFC Champions League	Group stage	0–1	(Iran) Esteghlal	Jeddah, KSA
2024–25 AFC Champions League Elite	League stage			
2024–25 AFC Champions League Elite	League stage	1–1	(Saudi Arabia) Al-Nassr	Baghdad, Iraq
2024–25 AFC Champions League Elite	League stage	0–5	(Saudi Arabia) Al-Hilal	Riyadh, KSA
2024–25 AFC Champions League Elite	League stage	0–0	(Uzbekistan) Pakhtakor	Karbala, Iraq
2024–25 AFC Champions League Elite	League stage	1–5	(Saudi Arabia) Al-Ahli	Jeddah, KSA
2024–25 AFC Champions League Elite	League stage	1–3	(United Arab Emirates) Al-Wasl	Karbala, Iraq
2024–25 AFC Champions League Elite	League stage	1–2	(Iran) Persepolis	Doha, Qatar
2024–25 AFC Champions League Elite	League stage	1–1	(Iran) Esteghlal	Tehran, Iran
2024–25 AFC Champions League Elite	League stage	2–0	(United Arab Emirates) Al-Ain	Baghdad, Iraq
2025–26 AFC Champions League Elite	League stage			
2025–26 AFC Champions League Elite	League stage	1–1	(Qatar) Al-Sadd	Baghdad, Iraq
2025–26 AFC Champions League Elite	League stage	0–2	(Qatar) Al-Gharafa	Al-Rayyan, Qatar
2025–26 AFC Champions League Elite	League stage	1–4	(Saudi Arabia) Al-Ittihad	Baghdad, Iraq
2025–26 AFC Champions League Elite	League stage	0–1	(Iran) Tractor	Tabriz, Iran
2025–26 AFC Champions League Elite	League stage	0–4	(Saudi Arabia) Al-Hilal	Riyadh, KSA
2025–26 AFC Champions League Elite	League stage	0–5	(Saudi Arabia) Al-Ahli	Baghdad, Iraq
2025–26 AFC Champions League Elite	League stage	1–1	(Uzbekistan) Nasaf	Ferghana, Uzbekistan
2025–26 AFC Champions League Elite	League stage	3–2	(Qatar) Al-Duhail	Baghdad, Iraq
2026–27 AFC Champions League Two	Group stage			
2026–27 AFC Champions League Two	Group stage	1–0	(Oman) Al-Seeb	Baghdad, Iraq
2026–27 AFC Champions League Two	Group stage	3–2	(India) East Bengal	Kolkata, India
2026–27 AFC Champions League Two	Group stage	1–1	(Jordan) Al-Hussein	Baghdad, Iraq
2026–27 AFC Champions League Two	Group stage	3–0	(Jordan) Al-Hussein	Amman, Jordan
2026–27 AFC Champions League Two	Group stage		(Oman) Al-Seeb	Seeb, Oman
2026–27 AFC Champions League Two	Group stage		(India) East Bengal	Baghdad, Iraq
2026–27 AFC Champions League Two	Round of 16			

==== Al-Talaba ====
Al-Talaba Statistics
Team	Pld	W	D	L	GF	GA	GD
(Iraq) Al-Talaba	9	2	2	5	7	10	−3

Al-Talaba results
Season	Round	Result	Opponent	Venue
2002–03 AFC Champions League	Group stage			
2002–03 AFC Champions League	Group stage	0–1	(Iran) Persepolis	Tashkent, Uzbekistan
2002–03 AFC Champions League	Group stage	3–0	(Turkmenistan) Nisa Asgabat	Tashkent, Uzbekistan
2002–03 AFC Champions League	Group stage	0–3	(Uzbekistan) Pakhtakor	Tashkent, Uzbekistan
2011 AFC Cup	Group stage			
2011 AFC Cup	Group stage	0–1	(Jordan) Al-Wehdat	Erbil, Iraq
2011 AFC Cup	Group stage	0–1	Al-Kuwait	Kuwait City, Kuwait
2011 AFC Cup	Group stage	2–1	(Oman) Al-Suwaiq	Muscat, Oman
2011 AFC Cup	Group stage	1–1	(Oman) Al-Suwaiq	Erbil, Iraq
2011 AFC Cup	Group stage	0–0	(Jordan) Al-Wehdat	Amman, Jordan
2011 AFC Cup	Group stage	1–2	Al-Kuwait	Erbil, Iraq

==== Al-Zawraa ====
Al-Zawraa Statistics
Team	Pld	W	D	L	GF	GA	GD
(Iraq) Al-Zawraa	65	27	18	20	98	86	+12

Al-Zawraa results
Season	Round	Result	Opponent	Venue
2002–03 AFC Champions League	Qualifying play–off			
2002–03 AFC Champions League	Qualifying play–off	1–1	(Qatar) Al-Sadd	Doha, Qatar
2002–03 AFC Champions League	Qualifying play–off	1–2	(Qatar) Al-Sadd	Baghdad, Iraq
2005 AFC Champions League	Group stage			
2005 AFC Champions League	Group stage	1–2	(Saudi Arabia) Al-Ahli	Tripoli, Lebanon
2005 AFC Champions League	Group stage	2–1	(Uzbekistan) Pakhtakor	Tashkent, Uzbekistan
2005 AFC Champions League	Group stage	1–5	(Syria) Al-Jaish	Tripoli, Lebanon
2005 AFC Champions League	Group stage	0–0	(Syria) Al-Jaish	Damascus, Syria
2005 AFC Champions League	Group stage	1–5	(Saudi Arabia) Al-Ahli	Jeddah, KSA
2005 AFC Champions League	Group stage	2–1	(Uzbekistan) Pakhtakor	Tripoli, Lebanon
2007 AFC Champions League	Group stage			
2007 AFC Champions League	Group stage	1–0	(Kuwait) Al-Arabi	Kuwait City, Kuwait
2007 AFC Champions League	Group stage	0–0	(Qatar) Al-Rayyan	Doha, Qatar
2007 AFC Champions League	Group stage	1–2	(United Arab Emirates) Al-Wahda	Doha, Qatar
2007 AFC Champions League	Group stage	1–1	(United Arab Emirates) Al-Wahda	Abu Dhabi, UAE
2007 AFC Champions League	Group stage	3–2	(Kuwait) Al-Arabi	Doha, Qatar
2007 AFC Champions League	Group stage	3–1	(Qatar) Al-Rayyan	Doha, Qatar
2009 AFC Cup	Group stage			
2009 AFC Cup	Group stage	2–0	(Yemen) Al-Hilal Al-Sahili	Dubai, UAE
2009 AFC Cup	Group stage	0–2	(Lebanon) Safa	Beirut, Lebanon
2009 AFC Cup	Group stage	2–0	(Oman) Al-Suwaiq	Dubai, UAE
2009 AFC Cup	Group stage	1–0	(Oman) Al-Suwaiq	Seeb, Oman
2009 AFC Cup	Group stage	1–1	(Yemen) Al-Hilal Al-Sahili	Sanaa, Yemen
2009 AFC Cup	Group stage	2–1	(Lebanon) Safa	Dubai, UAE
2009 AFC Cup	Round of 16			
2009 AFC Cup	Round of 16	1–3	(Iraq) Erbil	Dubai, UAE
2012 AFC Cup	Group stage			
2012 AFC Cup	Group stage	2–3	(Syria) Al-Shorta	Amman, Jordan
2012 AFC Cup	Group stage	5–0	(Yemen) Al-Tilal	Duhok, Iraq
2012 AFC Cup	Group stage	1–0	(Lebanon) Safa	Duhok, Iraq
2012 AFC Cup	Group stage	0–1	(Lebanon) Safa	Beirut, Lebanon
2012 AFC Cup	Group stage	2–1	(Syria) Al-Shorta	Duhok, Iraq
2012 AFC Cup	Group stage	2–0	(Yemen) Al-Tilal	Duhok, Iraq
2012 AFC Cup	Round of 16			
2012 AFC Cup	Round of 16	0–1	(Thailand) Chonburi	Chonburi, Thailand
2017 AFC Cup	Group stage			
2017 AFC Cup	Group stage	0–0	(Oman) Al-Suwaiq	Doha, Qatar
2017 AFC Cup	Group stage	1–1	(Jordan) Al-Ahli	Amman, Jordan
2017 AFC Cup	Group stage	3–1	(Syria) Al-Jaish	Doha, Qatar
2017 AFC Cup	Group stage	3–0	(Syria) Al-Jaish	Al Khor, Qatar
2017 AFC Cup	Group stage	1–0	(Oman) Al-Suwaiq	Muscat, Oman
2017 AFC Cup	Group stage	1–1	(Jordan) Al-Ahli	Doha, Qatar
2017 AFC Cup	Zonal semi-finals			
2017 AFC Cup	Zonal semi-finals	1–1	(Iraq) Al-Quwa Al-Jawiya	Erbil, Iraq
2017 AFC Cup	Zonal semi-finals	0–1	(Iraq) Al-Quwa Al-Jawiya	Doha, Qatar
2018 AFC Cup	Group stage			
2018 AFC Cup	Group stage	1–1	(Lebanon) Al-Ahed	Beirut, Lebanon
2018 AFC Cup	Group stage	0–0	(Syria) Al-Jaish	Doha, Qatar
2018 AFC Cup	Group stage	3–1	(Bahrain) Manama	Manama, Bahrain
2018 AFC Cup	Group stage	1–1	(Lebanon) Al-Ahed	Karbala, Iraq
2018 AFC Cup	Group stage	2–1	(Bahrain) Manama	Karbala, Iraq
2018 AFC Cup	Group stage	1–1	(Syria) Al-Jaish	Riffa, Bahrain
2019 AFC Champions League	Group stage			
2019 AFC Champions League	Group stage	0–0	(Iran) Zob Ahan	Isfahan, Iran
2019 AFC Champions League	Group stage	5–0	(United Arab Emirates) Al-Wasl	Karbala, Iraq
2019 AFC Champions League	Group stage	1–4	(Saudi Arabia) Al-Nassr	Riyadh, KSA
2019 AFC Champions League	Group stage	1–2	(Saudi Arabia) Al-Nassr	Karbala, Iraq
2019 AFC Champions League	Group stage	2–2	(Iran) Zob Ahan	Karbala, Iraq
2019 AFC Champions League	Group stage	5–1	(United Arab Emirates) Al-Wasl	Dubai, UAE
2020 AFC Champions League	Qualifying play-off			
2020 AFC Champions League	Qualifying play-off	1–4	(Uzbekistan) Bunyodkor	Tashkent, Uzbekistan
2021 AFC Champions League	Qualifying play-off			
2021 AFC Champions League	Qualifying play-off	1–2	(United Arab Emirates) Al-Wahda	Dubai, UAE
2022 AFC Champions League	Qualifying play-off			
2022 AFC Champions League	Qualifying play-off	1–1 (a.e.t.); 5–6 (p)	(United Arab Emirates) Sharjah	Sharjah, UAE
2023–24 AFC Cup	Group stage			
2023–24 AFC Cup	Group stage	1–2	(Kuwait) Al-Arabi	Basra, Iraq
2023–24 AFC Cup	Group stage	1–1	(Bahrain) Al-Riffa	Isa Town, Bahrain
2023–24 AFC Cup	Group stage	4–1	(Lebanon) Nejmeh	Basra, Iraq
2023–24 AFC Cup	Group stage	2–1	(Lebanon) Nejmeh	Taif, KSA
2023–24 AFC Cup	Group stage	1–1	(Kuwait) Al-Arabi	Kuwait City, Kuwait
2023–24 AFC Cup	Group stage	2–1	(Bahrain) Al-Riffa	Basra, Iraq
2025–26 AFC Champions League Two	Group stage			
2025–26 AFC Champions League Two	Group stage	2–0	(India) Goa	Goa, India
2025–26 AFC Champions League Two	Group stage	0–2	(Saudi Arabia) Al-Nassr	Baghdad, Iraq
2025–26 AFC Champions League Two	Group stage	1–2	(Tajikistan) Istiklol	Hisor, Tajikistan
2025–26 AFC Champions League Two	Group stage	2–1	(Tajikistan) Istiklol	Baghdad, Iraq
2025–26 AFC Champions League Two	Group stage	2–1	(India) Goa	Baghdad, Iraq
2025–26 AFC Champions League Two	Group stage	1–5	(Saudi Arabia) Al-Nassr	Riyadh, KSA
2025–26 AFC Champions League Two	Round of 16			
2025–26 AFC Champions League Two	Round of 16	3–2	(United Arab Emirates) Al-Wasl	Baghdad, Iraq
2025–26 AFC Champions League Two	Round of 16	2–4 (a.e.t.)	(United Arab Emirates) Al-Wasl	Dubai, UAE

==== Duhok ====
Duhok Statistics
Team	Pld	W	D	L	GF	GA	GD
(Iraq) Duhok	16	8	3	5	23	18	+5

Duhok results
Season	Round	Result	Opponent	Venue
2011 AFC Cup	Group stage			
2011 AFC Cup	Group stage	1–0	(Kuwait) Al-Nasr	Kuwait City, Kuwait
2011 AFC Cup	Group stage	4–2	(Jordan) Al-Faisaly	Duhok, Iraq
2011 AFC Cup	Group stage	0–0	(Syria) Al-Jaish	Damascus, Syria
2011 AFC Cup	Group stage	0–1	(Syria) Al-Jaish	Duhok, Iraq
2011 AFC Cup	Group stage	1–0	(Kuwait) Al-Nasr	Duhok, Iraq
2011 AFC Cup	Group stage	0–0	(Jordan) Al-Faisaly	Amman, Jordan
2011 AFC Cup	Round of 16			
2011 AFC Cup	Round of 16	1–0	(India) Dempo	Duhok, Iraq
2011 AFC Cup	Quarterfinals			
2011 AFC Cup	Quarterfinals	1–5	(Jordan) Al-Wehdat	Amman, Jordan
2011 AFC Cup	Quarterfinals	0–3	(Jordan) Al-Wehdat	Duhok, Iraq
2013 AFC Cup	Group stage			
2013 AFC Cup	Group stage	3–1	(Yemen) Al-Shaab Ibb	Duhok, Iraq
2013 AFC Cup	Group stage	0–1	(Jordan) Al-Faisaly	Duhok, Iraq
2013 AFC Cup	Group stage	3–1	(Oman) Dhofar	Salalah, Oman
2013 AFC Cup	Group stage	6–1	(Oman) Dhofar	Duhok, Iraq
2013 AFC Cup	Group stage	2–1	(Yemen) Al-Shaab Ibb	Duhok, Iraq
2013 AFC Cup	Group stage	0–1	(Jordan) Al-Faisaly	Amman, Jordan
2013 AFC Cup	Round of 16			
2013 AFC Cup	Round of 16	1–1 (a.e.t.); 1–4 (p)	Al-Kuwait	Kuwait City, Kuwait

==== Erbil ====
Erbil Statistics
Team	Pld	W	D	L	GF	GA	GD
(Iraq) Erbil	63	36	15	12	125	63	+62

Erbil results
Season	Round	Result	Opponent	Venue
2008 AFC Champions League	Group stage			
2008 AFC Champions League	Group stage	1–1	(Qatar) Al-Gharafa	Amman, Jordan
2008 AFC Champions League	Group stage	1–1	(Kuwait) Al-Qadisiya	Kuwait City, Kuwait
2008 AFC Champions League	Group stage	0–2	(Uzbekistan) Pakhtakor	Tashkent, Uzbekistan
2008 AFC Champions League	Group stage	1–5	(Uzbekistan) Pakhtakor	Amman, Jordan
2008 AFC Champions League	Group stage	1–0	(Qatar) Al-Gharafa	Doha, Qatar
2008 AFC Champions League	Group stage	4–2	(Kuwait) Al-Qadisiya	Amman, Jordan
2009 AFC Cup	Group stage			
2009 AFC Cup	Group stage	0–1	(Lebanon) Al-Mabarrah	Beirut, Lebanon
2009 AFC Cup	Group stage	1–1	(Kuwait) Al-Arabi	Amman, Jordan
2009 AFC Cup	Group stage	1–1	(Oman) Al-Oruba	Seeb, Oman
2009 AFC Cup	Group stage	3–0	(Oman) Al-Oruba	Zarqa, Jordan
2009 AFC Cup	Group stage	3–2	(Lebanon) Al-Mabarrah	Zarqa, Jordan
2009 AFC Cup	Group stage	0–2	(Kuwait) Al-Arabi	Kuwait City, Kuwait
2009 AFC Cup	Round of 16			
2009 AFC Cup	Round of 16	3–1	(Iraq) Al-Zawraa	Dubai, UAE
2009 AFC Cup	Quarterfinals			
2009 AFC Cup	Quarterfinals	1–1	Al-Kuwait	Kuwait City, Kuwait
2009 AFC Cup	Quarterfinals	0–1	Al-Kuwait	Erbil, Iraq
2011 AFC Cup	Group stage			
2011 AFC Cup	Group stage	2–1	(Lebanon) Al-Ahed	Beirut, Lebanon
2011 AFC Cup	Group stage	1–1	(Syria) Al-Karamah	Erbil, Iraq
2011 AFC Cup	Group stage	0–0	(Oman) Al-Oruba	Erbil, Iraq
2011 AFC Cup	Group stage	5–0	(Oman) Al-Oruba	Seeb, Oman
2011 AFC Cup	Group stage	6–2	(Lebanon) Al-Ahed	Erbil, Iraq
2011 AFC Cup	Group stage	3–0	(Syria) Al-Karamah	Damascus, Syria
2011 AFC Cup	Round of 16			
2011 AFC Cup	Round of 16	1–0 (a.e.t.)	(Singapore) Tampines Rovers	Erbil, Iraq
2011 AFC Cup	Quarterfinals			
2011 AFC Cup	Quarterfinals	2–1	(Indonesia) Persipura Jayapura	Jayapura, Indonesia
2011 AFC Cup	Quarterfinals	1–0	(Indonesia) Persipura Jayapura	Erbil, Iraq
2011 AFC Cup	Semifinals			
2011 AFC Cup	Semifinals	0–2	Al-Kuwait	Erbil, Iraq
2011 AFC Cup	Semifinals	3–3	Al-Kuwait	Kuwait City, Kuwait
2012 AFC Cup	Group stage			
2012 AFC Cup	Group stage	1–1	(Kuwait) Kazma	Erbil, Iraq
2012 AFC Cup	Group stage	2–2	(Yemen) Al-Oruba	Erbil, Iraq
2012 AFC Cup	Group stage	2–0	(India) East Bengal	Calcutta, India
2012 AFC Cup	Group stage	2–0	(India) East Bengal	Erbil, Iraq
2012 AFC Cup	Group stage	2–1	(Kuwait) Kazma	Kuwait City, Kuwait
2012 AFC Cup	Group stage	2–1	(Yemen) Al-Oruba	Erbil, Iraq
2012 AFC Cup	Round of 16			
2012 AFC Cup	Round of 16	4–0	(Uzbekistan) Neftchi Farg'ona	Erbil, Iraq
2012 AFC Cup	Quarterfinals			
2012 AFC Cup	Quarterfinals	5–1	(Malaysia) Kelantan	Erbil, Iraq
2012 AFC Cup	Quarterfinals	1–1	(Malaysia) Kelantan	Kota Bharu, Malaysia
2012 AFC Cup	Semifinals			
2012 AFC Cup	Semifinals	4–1	(Thailand) Chonburi	Erbil, Iraq
2012 AFC Cup	Semifinals	4–1	(Thailand) Chonburi	Chonburi, Thailand
2012 AFC Cup	Final			
2012 AFC Cup	Final	0–4	Al-Kuwait	Erbil, Iraq
2013 AFC Cup	Group stage			
2013 AFC Cup	Group stage	4–0	(Yemen) Al-Ahli Taiz	Erbil, Iraq
2013 AFC Cup	Group stage	2–0	(Lebanon) Al-Ansar	Beirut, Lebanon
2013 AFC Cup	Group stage	1–0	(Oman) Fanja	Erbil, Iraq
2013 AFC Cup	Group stage	4–0	(Oman) Fanja	Seeb, Oman
2013 AFC Cup	Group stage	4–0	(Yemen) Al-Ahli Taiz	Erbil, Iraq
2013 AFC Cup	Group stage	2–0	(Lebanon) Al-Ansar	Erbil, Iraq
2013 AFC Cup	Round of 16			
2013 AFC Cup	Round of 16	3–4 (a.e.t.)	(Syria) Al-Shorta	Erbil, Iraq
2014 AFC Cup	Group stage			
2014 AFC Cup	Group stage	3–1	(Jordan) Shabab Al Ordon	Amman, Jordan
2014 AFC Cup	Group stage	6–0	(Kyrgyzstan) Alay Osh	Doha, Qatar
2014 AFC Cup	Group stage	1–2	(Bahrain) Al Riffa	Doha, Qatar
2014 AFC Cup	Group stage	3–0	(Bahrain) Al Riffa	Riffa, Bahrain
2014 AFC Cup	Group stage	3–2	(Jordan) Shabab Al Ordon	Doha, Qatar
2014 AFC Cup	Group stage	3–0	(Kyrgyzstan) Alay Osh	Osh, Kyrgyzstan
2014 AFC Cup	Round of 16			
2014 AFC Cup	Round of 16	0–0 (a.e.t.); 3–0 (p)	(Lebanon) Nejmeh	Doha, Qatar
2014 AFC Cup	Quarterfinals			
2014 AFC Cup	Quarterfinals	1–0	(Vietnam) Hà Nội T&T	Hanoi, Vietnam
2014 AFC Cup	Quarterfinals	1–0	(Vietnam) Hà Nội T&T	Beirut, Lebanon
2014 AFC Cup	Semifinals			
2014 AFC Cup	Semifinals	1–1	(Hong Kong) Kitchee	Zarqa, Jordan
2014 AFC Cup	Semifinals	2–1	(Hong Kong) Kitchee	Mong Kok, Hong Kong
2014 AFC Cup	Final			
2014 AFC Cup	Final	0–0 (a.e.t.); 2–4 (p)	(Kuwait) Al Qadsia	Dubai, UAE
2015 AFC Cup	Group stage			
2015 AFC Cup	Group stage	3–1	(Tajikistan) Istiklol	Dushanbe, Tajikistan
2015 AFC Cup	Group stage	0–1	(Kuwait) Al Qadsia	Doha, Qatar
2015 AFC Cup	Group stage	1–2	(Turkmenistan) Ahal	Ashgabat, Turkmenistan
2015 AFC Cup	Group stage	2–3	(Turkmenistan) Ahal	Doha, Qatar
2015 AFC Cup	Group stage	0–0	(Tajikistan) Istiklol	Doha, Qatar
2015 AFC Cup	Group stage	2–1	(Kuwait) Al Qadsia	Kuwait City, Kuwait

==== Naft Al-Wasat ====
Naft Al-Wasat Statistics
Team	Pld	W	D	L	GF	GA	GD
(Iraq) Naft Al-Wasat	7	5	0	2	9	4	+5

Naft Al-Wasat results
Season	Round	Result	Opponent	Venue
2016 AFC Cup	Group stage			
2016 AFC Cup	Group stage	1–0	(Lebanon) Tripoli	Tehran, Iran
2016 AFC Cup	Group stage	1–2	(Jordan) Al-Faisaly	Amman, Jordan
2016 AFC Cup	Group stage	2–0	(Tajikistan) Istiklol	Tehran, Iran
2016 AFC Cup	Group stage	1–0	(Tajikistan) Istiklol	Dushanbe, Tajikistan
2016 AFC Cup	Group stage	3–1	(Lebanon) Tripoli	Tripoli, Lebanon
2016 AFC Cup	Group stage	1–0	(Jordan) Al-Faisaly	Tehran, Iran
2016 AFC Cup	Round of 16			
2016 AFC Cup	Round of 16	0–1	(Syria) Al-Jaish	Tehran, Iran

== See also ==
- Iraq Stars League
- Iraq FA Cup
