= 2014 AFC Cup knockout stage =

International football tournament

The knock-out stage of the 2014 AFC Cup was played from 13 May to 18 October 2014. A total of 16 teams competed in the knock-out stage.

== Qualified teams ==
The winners and runners-up of each of the eight groups in the group stage qualified for the knock-out stage. Both West Asia Zone and East Asia Zone had eight teams qualified.

Zone	Group	Winners	Runners-up
West Asia Zone (Groups A–D)	A	(Lebanon) Safa	(Jordan) That Ras
West Asia Zone (Groups A–D)	B	Al-Kuwait	(Lebanon) Al-Nejmeh
West Asia Zone (Groups A–D)	C	(Kuwait) Al-Qadsia	(Bahrain) Al-Hidd
West Asia Zone (Groups A–D)	D	(Iraq) Erbil	(Bahrain) Riffa
East Asia Zone (Groups E–H)	E	(Indonesia) Persipura Jayapura	(India) Churchill Brothers
East Asia Zone (Groups E–H)	F	(Vietnam) Hà Nội T&T	(Indonesia) Arema Cronus
East Asia Zone (Groups E–H)	G	(Vietnam) Vissai Ninh Bình	(Myanmar) Yangon United
East Asia Zone (Groups E–H)	H	(Hong Kong) Kitchee	(Myanmar) Nay Pyi Taw

== Format ==
In the knock-out stage, the 16 teams played a single-elimination tournament. In the quarter-finals and semi-finals, each tie was played on a home-and-away two-legged basis, while in the round of 16 and final, each tie was played as a single match. The away goals rule (for two-legged ties), extra time (away goals do not apply in extra time) and penalty shoot-out were used to decide the winner if necessary.

== Schedule ==
The schedule of each round was as follows.

Round	First leg	Second leg
Round of 16	13–14 May 2014	
Quarter-finals	19 August 2014	26 August 2014
Semi-finals	16 September 2014	30 September 2014
Final	18 October 2014	

== Bracket ==
In the round of 16, the winners of one group played the runners-up of another group in the same zone, with the group winners hosting the match. The matchups were determined as follows:

West Asia Zone

- Winner Group A vs. Runner-up Group C
- Winner Group C vs. Runner-up Group A
- Winner Group B vs. Runner-up Group D
- Winner Group D vs. Runner-up Group B

East Asia Zone

- Winner Group E vs. Runner-up Group G
- Winner Group G vs. Runner-up Group E
- Winner Group F vs. Runner-up Group H
- Winner Group H vs. Runner-up Group F

The draw for the quarter-finals was held on 28 May 2014, 15:00 UTC+8, at the AFC House in Kuala Lumpur, Malaysia. Teams from different zones could be drawn into the same tie, and the "country protection" rule was applied, so teams from the same association could not be drawn into the same tie.

There was no draw for the semi-finals, with the matchups determined by the quarter-final draw: Winner QF1 vs. Winner QF2 and Winner QF3 vs. Winner QF4, with winners QF2 and QF4 hosting the second leg.

The draw to decide the host team of the final was held after the quarter-final draw.

Round of 16
(Vietnam) Hà Nội T&T	5
(Myanmar) Nay Pyi Taw	0
(Iraq) Erbil (p)	0 (3)
(Lebanon) Al-Nejmeh	0 (0)
(Vietnam) Vissai Ninh Bình	4
(India) Churchill Brothers	2
(Hong Kong) Kitchee	2
(Indonesia) Arema Cronus	0
(Kuwait) Al-Qadsia	4
(Jordan) That Ras	0
(Lebanon) Safa	0
(Bahrain) Al-Hidd	1
Al-Kuwait	3
(Bahrain) Riffa	0
(Indonesia) Persipura Jayapura	9
(Myanmar) Yangon United	2

Quarter-finals
(Vietnam) Hà Nội T&T	0	0	0
(Iraq) Erbil	1	2	3
(Vietnam) Vissai Ninh Bình	2	1	3
(Hong Kong) Kitchee	4	0	4
(Kuwait) Al-Qadsia (a)	1	2	3
(Bahrain) Al-Hidd	1	2	3
Al-Kuwait	3	1	4
(Indonesia) Persipura Jayapura	2	6	8

Semi-finals
(Iraq) Erbil	1	2	3
(Hong Kong) Kitchee	1	1	2
(Kuwait) Al-Qadsia	4	6	10
(Indonesia) Persipura Jayapura	2	0	2

Final
(Iraq) Erbil	0 (2)
(Kuwait) Al-Qadsia (p)	0 (4)

== Round of 16 ==
Team 1	Score	Team 2
West Asia Zone
Safa (Lebanon)	0–1	(Bahrain) Al-Hidd
Al-Qadsia (Kuwait)	4–0	(Jordan) That Ras
Al-Kuwait	3–0	(Bahrain) Riffa
Erbil (Iraq)	0–0 (a.e.t.) (3–0 p)	(Lebanon) Al-Nejmeh
East Asia Zone
Persipura Jayapura (Indonesia)	9–2	(Myanmar) Yangon United
Vissai Ninh Bình (Vietnam)	4–2	(India) Churchill Brothers
Hà Nội T&T (Vietnam)	5–0	(Myanmar) Nay Pyi Taw
Kitchee (Hong Kong)	2–0	(Indonesia) Arema Cronus

13 May 2014
15:30 UTC+9

Persipura Jayapura (Indonesia)	9–2	(Myanmar) Yangon United
Foday 2', 23', 41', 43', 86'; Pae 10'; Kabes 28' (pen.), 53'; Bonai 57'	Report	César 16'; Kyaw Ko Ko 21'

Mandala Stadium, Jayapura
Attendance: 12,385
Referee: Marai Al-Awaji (Saudi Arabia)

13 May 2014
17:00 UTC+7

Vissai Ninh Bình (Vietnam)	4–2	(India) Churchill Brothers
Lê Văn Thắng 23'; Sim Woon-sub 28'; Phạm Văn Quyến 67', 88'	Report	B. Singh 21'; Shabana 76' (pen.)

Ninh Bình Stadium, Ninh Bình
Attendance: 3,000
Referee: Jumpei Iida (Japan)

13 May 2014
17:00 UTC+3

Safa (Lebanon)	0–1	(Bahrain) Al-Hidd
	Report	Al-Malood 53'

Camille Chamoun Sports City Stadium, Beirut
Attendance: 250
Referee: Kim Sang-woo (South Korea)

13 May 2014
20:15 UTC+3

Al-Qadsia (Kuwait)	4–0	(Jordan) That Ras
Al Somah 7'; Al Hashan 14'; Neda 39'; Al-Mutawa 74'	Report

Al-Sadaqua Walsalam Stadium, Kuwait City
Attendance: 300
Referee: Hettikamkanamge Perera (Sri Lanka)

14 May 2014
18:30 UTC+7

Hà Nội T&T (Vietnam)	5–0	(Myanmar) Nay Pyi Taw
Hector 34'; Samson 45', 67'; Thạch Bảo Khanh 62'; Phạm Thành Lương 88'	Report

Hàng Đẫy Stadium, Hanoi
Attendance: 1,100
Referee: Mohanad Qasim Eesee Sarray (Iraq)

14 May 2014
20:00 UTC+8

Kitchee (Hong Kong)	2–0	(Indonesia) Arema Cronus
Jang Kyung-jin 5'; Lam Ka Wai 9'	Report

Mong Kok Stadium, Hong Kong
Attendance: 4,072
Referee: Fahad Al-Mirdasi (Saudi Arabia)

14 May 2014
19:10 UTC+3

Al-Kuwait	3–0	(Bahrain) Riffa
Jemâa 44'; Hakem 82'; Al Ateeqi 90+4'	Report

Al Kuwait Sports Club Stadium, Kuwait City
Attendance: 350
Referee: Ma Ning (China PR)

14 May 2014
19:30 UTC+3

Erbil (Iraq)	0–0 (a.e.t.)	(Lebanon) Al-Nejmeh
	Report
Penalties
Radhi (penalty scored); Abdul-Amir (penalty scored); Faez (penalty scored)	3–0	(penalty missed) Takaji; (penalty missed) Hamieh; (penalty missed) Zein

Abdullah bin Khalifa Stadium, Doha (Qatar)
Attendance: 300
Referee: Nagor Amir Noor Mohamed (Malaysia)

Notes

1. Teams from Iraq were not allowed to host their home matches in their country due to security concerns.

== Quarter-finals ==
Team 1	Agg.	Team 2	1st leg	2nd leg
Hà Nội T&T (Vietnam)	0–3	(Iraq) Erbil	0–1	0–2
Vissai Ninh Bình (Vietnam)	3–4	(Hong Kong) Kitchee	2–4	1–0
Al-Qadsia (Kuwait)	3–3 (a)	(Bahrain) Al-Hidd	1–1	2–2
Al-Kuwait	4–8	(Indonesia) Persipura Jayapura	3–2	1–6

=== First leg ===
19 August 2014
17:00 UTC+7

Vissai Ninh Bình (Vietnam)	2–4	(Hong Kong) Kitchee
Oladoja 56'; Lê Văn Thắng 75'	Report	Belencoso 29', 90+3'; Ngan Lok Fung 49'; Xu Deshuai 73'

Ninh Bình Stadium, Ninh Bình
Attendance: 4,500
Referee: Dmitriy Mashentsev (Kyrgyzstan)

19 August 2014
19:30 UTC+7

Hà Nội T&T (Vietnam)	0–1	(Iraq) Erbil
	Report	Radhi 44'

Hàng Đẫy Stadium, Hanoi
Attendance: 1,980
Referee: Muhammad Taqi Aljaafari Bin Jahari (Singapore)

19 August 2014
20:00 UTC+3

Al-Qadsia (Kuwait)	1–1	(Bahrain) Al-Hidd
Al-Mutawa 5'	Report	Al Khaldi 47'

Al-Sadaqua Walsalam Stadium, Kuwait City
Attendance: 200
Referee: Ma Ning (China PR)

19 August 2014
20:15 UTC+3

Al-Kuwait	3–2	(Indonesia) Persipura Jayapura
Hammami 4'; Al Kandari 84', 87'	Report	Lim Joon-sik 13'; Pangkali 23'

Al Kuwait Sports Club Stadium, Kuwait City
Attendance: 400
Referee: Marai Al Awaji (Saudi Arabia)

=== Second leg ===
26 August 2014
15:30 UTC+9

Persipura Jayapura (Indonesia)	6–1	Al-Kuwait
Pugliara 2', 45+3', 66'; Solossa 44'; Bonai 52'; Pahabol 90+3'	Report	Ghoochannejhad 65'

Mandala Stadium, Jayapura
Attendance: 5,992
Referee: Wang Di (China PR)

Persipura Jayapura won 8–4 on aggregate.

26 August 2014
20:00 UTC+8

Kitchee (Hong Kong)	0–1	(Vietnam) Vissai Ninh Bình
	Report	Oladoja 28'

Mong Kok Stadium, Hong Kong
Attendance: 4,975
Referee: Ammar Al-Jeneibi (United Arab Emirates)

Kitchee won 4–3 on aggregate.

26 August 2014
18:30 UTC+3

Al-Hidd (Bahrain)	2–2	(Kuwait) Al-Qadsia
Orok 25'; Al Khattal 57'	Report	Subotić 68' (pen.); Al Daoud 89' (o.g.)

Bahrain National Stadium, Riffa
Attendance: 600
Referee: Ko Hyung-jin (South Korea)

3–3 on aggregate. Al-Qadsia won on away goals.

26 August 2014
19:30 UTC+3

Erbil (Iraq)	2–0	(Vietnam) Hà Nội T&T
Radhi 57' (pen.); Halgurd 88'	Report

Saida Municipal Stadium, Sidon (Lebanon)
Attendance: 0
Referee: Yudai Yamamoto (Japan)

Erbil won 3–0 on aggregate.

Notes

2. Teams from Iraq were not allowed to host their home matches in their country due to security concerns.

== Semi-finals ==
Team 1	Agg.	Team 2	1st leg	2nd leg
Erbil (Iraq)	3–2	(Hong Kong) Kitchee	1–1	2–1
Al-Qadsia (Kuwait)	10–2	(Indonesia) Persipura Jayapura	4–2	6–0

=== First leg ===
16 September 2014
16:00 UTC+3

Erbil (Iraq)	1–1	(Hong Kong) Kitchee
Salah 59'	Report	Belencoso 68' (pen.)

Prince Mohammed Stadium, Zarqa (Jordan)
Attendance: 300
Referee: Hettikamkanamge Perera (Sri Lanka)

16 September 2014
19:30 UTC+3

Al-Qadsia (Kuwait)	4–2	(Indonesia) Persipura Jayapura
Subotić 11', 77'; Al Hashan 64'; Al-Mutawa 65'	Report	Bonai 21'; Solossa 31'

Al Kuwait Sports Club Stadium, Kuwait City
Attendance: 3,000
Referee: Mohd Amirul Izwan Bin Yaacob (Malaysia)

Notes

3. Teams from Iraq were not allowed to host their home matches in their country due to security concerns.

=== Second leg ===
30 September 2014
15:30 UTC+9

Persipura Jayapura (Indonesia)	0–6	(Kuwait) Al-Qadsia
	Report	Al Hashan 5'; Al-Mutawa 33', 73'; Al Sheikh 56', 90+2'; Al Ansari 75'

Mandala Stadium, Jayapura
Attendance: 18,127
Referee: Minoru Tōjō (Japan)

Al-Qadsia won 10–2 on aggregate.

30 September 2014
20:00 UTC+8

Kitchee (Hong Kong)	1–2	(Iraq) Erbil
Gao Wen 69'	Report	Faez 3'; Radhi 9'

Mong Kok Stadium, Hong Kong
Attendance: 6,500
Referee: Strebre Delovski (Australia)

Erbil won 3–2 on aggregate.

== Final ==
Team 1	Score	Team 2
Erbil (Iraq)	0–0 (a.e.t.) (2–4 p)	(Kuwait) Al-Qadsia

18 October 2014
20:00 UTC+4

Erbil (Iraq)	0–0 (a.e.t.)	(Kuwait) Al-Qadsia
	Report
Penalties
Radhi (penalty scored); Hawar (penalty missed); Barzan (penalty scored); Faez (penalty missed)	2–4	(penalty scored) Al-Mutawa; (penalty missed) Said; (penalty scored) Al Ansari; (penalty scored) El Ebrahim; (penalty scored) Subotić

Maktoum Bin Rashid Al Maktoum Stadium, Dubai (United Arab Emirates)
Attendance: 5,240
Referee: Kim Dong-jin (South Korea)

Notes

4. Teams from Iraq were not allowed to host their home matches in their country due to security concerns.
