= 2014 AFC Cup group stage =

The group stage of the 2014 AFC Cup was played from 25 February to 23 April 2014. A total of 32 teams competed in the group stage.

== Draw ==
The draw for the group stage was held on 10 December 2013, 15:00 UTC+8, at the AFC House in Kuala Lumpur, Malaysia. The 32 teams were drawn into eight groups of four. Teams from the same association could not be drawn into the same group.

The following 32 teams (16 from West Asia Zone, 16 from East Asia Zone) were entered into the group-stage draw, which included the 30 automatic qualifiers and the two qualifying play-off winners, whose identity was not known at the time of the draw:

Zone	Teams
West Asia Zone (Groups A–D)	(Bahrain) Al-Hidd; (Bahrain) Riffa; (Iraq) Al-Shorta; (Iraq) Erbil; (Jordan) Shabab Al-Ordon; (Jordan) That Ras; Al-Kuwait; (Kuwait) Al-Qadsia; (Lebanon) Safa; (Lebanon) Al-Nejmeh; (Oman) Al-Suwaiq; (Oman) Fanja; (Syria) Al-Jaish; (Syria) Al-Wahda; Winner of play-off 1: (Tajikistan) Ravshan Kulob; Winner of play-off 2: (Kyrgyzstan) Alay Osh
East Asia Zone (Groups E–H)	(Hong Kong) South China; (Hong Kong) Kitchee; (India) Pune; (India) Churchill Brothers; (Indonesia) Persipura Jayapura; (Indonesia) Arema Cronus; (Malaysia) Selangor; (Malaysia) Kelantan; (Maldives) New Radiant; (Maldives) Maziya; (Myanmar) Yangon United; (Myanmar) Nay Pyi Taw; (Singapore) Tampines Rovers; (Singapore) Home United; (Vietnam) Hà Nội T&T; (Vietnam) Vissai Ninh Bình

Note: Teams in italics played in the AFC Champions League qualifying play-off, but failed to advance to the AFC Champions League group stage (had they advanced to the AFC Champions League group stage, they would have been replaced by another team from the same association).

== Format ==
In the group stage, each group was played on a home-and-away round-robin basis. The winners and runners-up of each group advanced to the round of 16.

=== Tiebreakers ===
The teams are ranked according to points (3 points for a win, 1 point for a draw, 0 points for a loss). If tied on points, tiebreakers are applied in the following order:

1. Greater number of points obtained in the group matches between the teams concerned
2. Goal difference resulting from the group matches between the teams concerned
3. Greater number of goals scored in the group matches between the teams concerned (away goals do not apply)
4. Goal difference in all the group matches
5. Greater number of goals scored in all the group matches
6. Penalty shoot-out if only two teams are involved and they are both on the field of play
7. Fewer score calculated according to the number of yellow and red cards received in the group matches (1 point for a single yellow card, 3 points for a red card as a consequence of two yellow cards, 3 points for a direct red card, 4 points for a yellow card followed by a direct red card)
8. Drawing of lots

== Groups ==
The matchdays were 25–26 February, 11–12 March, 18–19 March, 1–2 April, 8–9 April, and 22–23 April 2014.

=== Group A ===
Team	Pld	W	D	L	GF	GA	GD	Pts	SAF	THR	SUW	RAV
(Lebanon) Safa	6	5	1	0	13	1	+12	16		1–0	1–0	8–0
(Jordan) That Ras	6	3	2	1	9	4	+5	11	0–0		1–0	5–1
(Oman) Al-Suwaiq	6	2	1	3	8	4	+4	7	0–1	0–0		3–1
(Tajikistan) Ravshan Kulob	6	0	0	6	5	26	−21	0	1–2	2–3	0–5	

Legend: Blue = home team win; Yellow = draw; Red = away team win.
25 February 2014
19:00 UTC+4

Al-Suwaiq (Oman)	3–1	(Tajikistan) Ravshan Kulob
Al-Ghassani 30'; Al-Alawi 59'; Tchomogo 80'	Report	Hakimov 78'

Al-Seeb Stadium, Al-Seeb
Attendance: 2,000
Referee: Mohanad Qasim Eesee Sarray (Iraq)
25 February 2014
17:00 UTC+2

Safa (Lebanon)	1–0	(Jordan) That Ras
Azar 84'	Report

Camille Chamoun Sports City Stadium, Beirut
Attendance: 220
Referee: Jameel Abdulhusin (Bahrain)

11 March 2014
17:00 UTC+2

That Ras (Jordan)	1–0	(Oman) Al-Suwaiq
Talaat 84'	Report

Amman International Stadium, Amman
Attendance: 300
Referee: Yousef Al-Marzouq (Kuwait)
12 March 2014
14:00 UTC+5

Ravshan Kulob (Tajikistan)	1–2	(Lebanon) Safa
Takyi 69'	Report	Mansour 23' (pen.); Hazimeh 82'

Stadium Metallurg 1st District, Tursunzoda
Attendance: 7,000
Referee: Khurram Shahzad (Pakistan)

18 March 2014
14:00 UTC+5

Ravshan Kulob (Tajikistan)	2–3	(Jordan) That Ras
Hakimov 35'; Takyi 79'	Report	Mjarmesh 21'; Muwafi 37'; Abdel-Rahman 89'

Stadium Metallurg 1st District, Tursunzoda
Attendance: 4,000
Referee: Dmitriy Mashentsev (Kyrgyzstan)
18 March 2014
19:00 UTC+4

Al-Suwaiq (Oman)	0–1	(Lebanon) Safa
	Report	Nasseredine 18'

Al-Seeb Stadium, Al-Seeb
Attendance: 1,200
Referee: Khamis Al-Marri (Qatar)

2 April 2014
17:00 UTC+3

That Ras (Jordan)	5–1	(Tajikistan) Ravshan Kulob
Abdel-Rahman 27', 75'; Youssef 49', 51'; Talaat 67'	Report	Gafforov 62'

Amman International Stadium, Amman
Attendance: 303
Referee: Masoud Tufayelieh (Syria)
2 April 2014
17:00 UTC+3

Safa (Lebanon)	1–0	(Oman) Al-Suwaiq
Karaki 74'	Report

Camille Chamoun Sports City Stadium, Beirut
Attendance: 200
Referee: Dmitriy Mashentsev (Kyrgyzstan)

9 April 2014
17:00 UTC+3

That Ras (Jordan)	0–0	(Lebanon) Safa
	Report

Amman International Stadium, Amman
Attendance: 1,000
Referee: Ali Sabah Adday Al-Qaysi (Iraq)
10 April 2014
15:00 UTC+5

Ravshan Kulob (Tajikistan)	0–5	(Oman) Al-Suwaiq
	Report	Al-Ghassani 24', 64'; Al-Jafal 51'; Al-Noufali 54'; Abduldaim 76'

Pamir Stadium, Dushanbe
Attendance: 5,000
Referee: Win Cho (Myanmar)

23 April 2014
16:00 UTC+3

Safa (Lebanon)	8–0	(Tajikistan) Ravshan Kulob
Nasseredine 13', 52'; Azar 33'; Tahan 40'; Karaki 56'; Mansour 68' (pen.); Chouman 69'; Dyab 80'	Report

Camille Chamoun Sports City Stadium, Beirut
Attendance: 150
Referee: Çarymyrat Gurbanow (Turkmenistan)
23 April 2014
20:30 UTC+4

Al-Suwaiq (Oman)	0–0	(Jordan) That Ras
	Report

Al-Seeb Stadium, Al-Seeb
Attendance: 200
Referee: Nagor Amir Noor Mohamed (Malaysia)

=== Group B ===
Team	Pld	W	D	L	GF	GA	GD	Pts	KUW	NEJ	FAN	JAI
Al-Kuwait	6	4	1	1	12	4	+8	13		2–1	4–0	2–0
(Lebanon) Al-Nejmeh	6	2	3	1	4	3	+1	9	1–1		1–0	0–0
(Oman) Fanja	6	1	3	2	2	6	−4	6	2–1	0–0		0–0
(Syria) Al-Jaish	6	0	3	3	0	5	−5	3	0–2	0–1	0–0	

Legend: Blue = home team win; Yellow = draw; Red = away team win.
25 February 2014
19:30 UTC+3

Al-Kuwait	2–1	(Lebanon) Al-Nejmeh
Nekounam 67' (pen.); Ali 90+3'	Report	Moghrabi 75'

Al Kuwait Sports Club Stadium, Kuwait City
Attendance: 1,000
Referee: Fahad Al-Marri (Qatar)
26 February 2014
19:00 UTC+4

Al-Jaish (Syria)	0–0	(Oman) Fanja
	Report

Al-Seeb Stadium, Al-Seeb (Oman)
Attendance: 1,500
Referee: Ali Sabah Al-Qaysi (Iraq)

11 March 2014
19:00 UTC+4

Fanja (Oman)	2–1	Al-Kuwait
Al-Muqbali 42'; Cissé 53' (pen.)	Report	Nekounam 65'

Al-Seeb Stadium, Al-Seeb
Attendance: 1,000
Referee: Mukhtar Al Yarimi (Yemen)
11 March 2014
18:00 UTC+2

Al-Nejmeh (Lebanon)	0–0	(Syria) Al-Jaish
	Report

Camille Chamoun Sports City Stadium, Beirut
Attendance: 120
Referee: Timur Faizullin (Kyrgyzstan)

19 March 2014
18:00 UTC+2

Al-Nejmeh (Lebanon)	1–0	(Oman) Fanja
Moghrabi 60'	Report

Camille Chamoun Sports City Stadium, Beirut
Attendance: 500
Referee: Vladislav Tseytlin (Uzbekistan)
19 March 2014
19:40 UTC+3

Al-Kuwait	2–0	(Syria) Al-Jaish
Nekounam 42'; Hammami 85'	Report

Al Kuwait Sports Club Stadium, Kuwait City
Attendance: 700
Referee: Jameel Abdulhusin (Bahrain)

1 April 2014
19:00 UTC+4

Fanja (Oman)	0–0	(Lebanon) Al-Nejmeh
	Report

Al-Seeb Stadium, Al-Seeb
Attendance: 1,000
Referee: Vo Minh Tri (Vietnam)
1 April 2014
18:40 UTC+3

Al-Jaish (Syria)	0–2	Al-Kuwait
	Report	Jemâa 67', 90+1'

Al Kuwait Sports Club Stadium, Kuwait City (Kuwait)
Attendance: 750
Referee: Khurram Shahzad (Pakistan)

9 April 2014
18:00 UTC+3

Al-Nejmeh (Lebanon)	1–1	Al-Kuwait
Moghrabi 90+2'	Report	Al Kandari 82'

Camille Chamoun Sports City Stadium, Beirut
Attendance: 350
Referee: Mohanad Qasim Eesee Sarray (Iraq)
9 April 2014
19:00 UTC+4

Fanja (Oman)	0–0	(Syria) Al-Jaish
	Report

Al-Seeb Stadium, Al-Seeb
Attendance: 350
Referee: Khamis Al-Marri (Qatar)

24 April 2014
17:00 UTC+3

Al-Kuwait	4–0	(Oman) Fanja
Rogerinho 14', 58'; Al Saqer 24'; Hashem 62'	Report

Al Kuwait Sports Club Stadium, Kuwait City
Attendance: 100
Referee: Rowan Arumughan (India)
24 April 2014
17:00 UTC+3

Al-Jaish (Syria)	0–1	(Lebanon) Al-Nejmeh
	Report	Moghrabi 27'

Camille Chamoun Sports City Stadium, Beirut (Lebanon)
Attendance: 50
Referee: Adham Makhadmeh (Jordan)

Notes

1. Teams from Syria were not allowed to host their home matches in their country due to security concerns.

=== Group C ===
Team	Pld	W	D	L	GF	GA	GD	Pts	QAD	HID	SHO	WAH
(Kuwait) Al-Qadsia	6	3	2	1	11	5	+6	11 (Note: Tiebreakers: Al-Qadsia and Al-Hidd are ranked on head-to-head record.)		2–0	3–0	1–1
(Bahrain) Al-Hidd	6	3	2	1	10	6	+4	11	3–2		0–0	3–1
(Iraq) Al-Shorta	6	1	4	1	3	4	−1	7	0–0	0–0		0–0
(Syria) Al-Wahda	6	0	2	4	5	14	−9	2	1–3	1–4	1–3	

Legend: Blue = home team win; Yellow = draw; Red = away team win.
Notes:
26 February 2014
17:00 UTC+3

Al-Shorta (Iraq)	0–0	(Kuwait) Al-Qadsia
	Report

Saoud bin Abdulrahman Stadium, Al Wakrah (Qatar)
Attendance: 200
Referee: Yaqoob Abdul Baki (Oman)
26 February 2014
18:30 UTC+3

Al-Hidd (Bahrain)	3–1	(Syria) Al-Wahda
Orok 15', 89'; Al Saqer 56'	Report	Al-Sayed 25'

Bahrain National Stadium, Riffa
Attendance: 400
Referee: Ma Ning (China PR)

12 March 2014
14:00 UTC+2

Al-Wahda (Syria)	1–3	(Iraq) Al-Shorta
Buyuk 30'	Report	Kalaf 59', 60'; Karim 90+3' (pen.)

Saida Municipal Stadium, Sidon (Lebanon)
Attendance: 0
Referee: Çarymyrat Gurbanow (Turkmenistan)
12 March 2014
19:30 UTC+3

Al-Qadsia (Kuwait)	2–0	(Bahrain) Al-Hidd
Al Hashan 72'; Al Soma 85'	Report

Al-Sadaqua Walsalam Stadium, Kuwait City
Attendance: 400
Referee: Ilgiz Tantashev (Uzbekistan)

18 March 2014
18:30 UTC+3

Al-Hidd (Bahrain)	0–0	(Iraq) Al-Shorta
	Report

Bahrain National Stadium, Riffa
Attendance: 300
Referee: Fahad Al-Mirdasi (Saudi Arabia)
18 March 2014
19:45 UTC+3

Al-Wahda (Syria)	1–3	(Kuwait) Al-Qadsia
Omari 87'	Report	Al Hashan 19'; Al Soma 38'; Simplício 84'

Al-Sadaqua Walsalam Stadium, Kuwait City (Kuwait)
Attendance: 712
Referee: Pratap Singh (India)

21 March 2014
19:45 UTC+3

Al-Qadsia (Kuwait)	1–1	(Syria) Al-Wahda
Al Soma 39' (pen.)	Report	Al-Sayed 29' (pen.)

Al-Sadaqua Walsalam Stadium, Kuwait City
Attendance: 600
Referee: Mohammad Abu Loum (Jordan)
2 April 2014
18:00 UTC+3

Al-Shorta (Iraq)	0–0	(Bahrain) Al-Hidd
	Report

Saoud bin Abdulrahman Stadium, Al Wakrah (Qatar)
Attendance: 100
Referee: Adham Makhadmeh (Jordan)

8 April 2014
19:50 UTC+3

Al-Qadsia (Kuwait)	3–0	(Iraq) Al-Shorta
Al Soma 3', 50', 74'	Report

Al-Sadaqua Walsalam Stadium, Kuwait City
Attendance: 500
Referee: Timur Faizullin (Kyrgyzstan)
9 April 2014
18:30 UTC+3

Al-Wahda (Syria)	1–4	(Bahrain) Al-Hidd
Al-Sayed 78'	Report	Musabbeh 6'; Al Daoud 42'; Adnan 45+1'; Paulo Roberto 56'

Bahrain National Stadium, Riffa (Bahrain)
Attendance: 250
Referee: Ahmed Al-Kaf (Oman)

22 April 2014
18:30 UTC+3

Al-Hidd (Bahrain)	3–2	(Kuwait) Al-Qadsia
Al Malood 11'; Fatadi 38'; Orok 60'	Report	Al Mejmed 32', 45'

Bahrain National Stadium, Riffa
Attendance: 600
Referee: Vo Minh Tri (Vietnam)
22 April 2014
18:30 UTC+3

Al-Shorta (Iraq)	0–0	(Syria) Al-Wahda
	Report

Saoud bin Abdulrahman Stadium, Al Wakrah (Qatar)
Referee: Mukhtar Al Yarimi (Yemen)

Notes

2. Teams from Iraq were not allowed to host their home matches in their country due to security concerns.
3. Teams from Syria were not allowed to host their home matches in their country due to security concerns.

=== Group D ===
Team	Pld	W	D	L	GF	GA	GD	Pts	ERB	RIF	ORD	ALA
(Iraq) Erbil	6	5	0	1	19	5	+14	15		1–2	3–2	6–0
(Bahrain) Riffa	6	3	1	2	7	7	0	10	0–3		2–0	2–0
(Jordan) Shabab Al-Ordon	6	3	0	3	9	10	−1	9	1–3	3–1		2–1
(Kyrgyzstan) Alay Osh	6	0	1	5	1	14	−13	1	0–3	0–0	0–1	

Legend: Blue = home team win; Yellow = draw; Red = away team win.
26 February 2014
14:00 UTC+6

Alay Osh (Kyrgyzstan)	0–0	(Bahrain) Riffa
	Report

Suyumbayev Stadion, Osh
Attendance: 10,275
Referee: Chaiya Mahapab (Thailand)
26 February 2014
17:00 UTC+2

Shabab Al-Ordon (Jordan)	1–3	(Iraq) Erbil
Diop 36'	Report	Luay 53'; Radhi 61'; Rubiato 88'

Amman International Stadium, Amman
Attendance: 293
Referee: Ali Shaban (Kuwait)

12 March 2014
17:00 UTC+3

Erbil (Iraq)	6–0	(Kyrgyzstan) Alay Osh
Hawar 34', 52', 85'; Gotor 45'; Halgurd 56'; Shakor 89'	Report

Grand Hamad Stadium, Doha (Qatar)
Attendance: 120
Referee: Masoud Tufayelieh (Syria)
12 March 2014
18:30 UTC+3

Riffa (Bahrain)	2–0	(Jordan) Shabab Al-Ordon
Al Amer 55', 61'	Report

Bahrain National Stadium, Riffa
Attendance: 100
Referee: Ahmed Al-Kaf (Oman)

19 March 2014
17:00 UTC+3

Erbil (Iraq)	1–2	(Bahrain) Riffa
Halgurd 35'	Report	Duaij 40'; Sahyouni 68' (o.g.)

Grand Hamad Stadium, Doha (Qatar)
Attendance: 100
Referee: Marai Al Awaji (Saudi Arabia)
19 March 2014
17:00 UTC+2

Shabab Al-Ordon (Jordan)	2–1	(Kyrgyzstan) Alay Osh
Zahran 20' (pen.); Al-Essawi 40'	Report	Timofeev 25'

Amman International Stadium, Amman
Attendance: 150
Referee: Mohd Nafeez Abdul Wahab (Malaysia)

1 April 2014
16:00 UTC+6

Alay Osh (Kyrgyzstan)	0–1	(Jordan) Shabab Al-Ordon
	Report	Al-Maharmeh 89'

Suyumbayev Stadion, Osh
Attendance: 10,728
Referee: Pratap Singh (India)
1 April 2014
18:30 UTC+3

Riffa (Bahrain)	0–3	(Iraq) Erbil
	Report	Luay 74'; Rubiato 85', 90'

Bahrain National Stadium, Riffa
Attendance: 180
Referee: Wang Di (China PR)

8 April 2014
18:00 UTC+3

Erbil (Iraq)	3–2	(Jordan) Shabab Al-Ordon
Luay 3', 72'; Rubiato 89'	Report	Rawad 45'; Shishani 80'

Grand Hamad Stadium, Doha (Qatar)
Attendance: 100
Referee: Vladislav Tseytlin (Uzbekistan)
8 April 2014
18:10 UTC+3

Riffa (Bahrain)	2–0	(Kyrgyzstan) Alay Osh
Geílson 45'; Al Amer 71'	Report

Bahrain National Stadium, Riffa
Attendance: 300
Referee: Yousef Al-Marzouq (Kuwait)

22 April 2014
16:00 UTC+6

Alay Osh (Kyrgyzstan)	0–3	(Iraq) Erbil
	Report	Rubiato 16'; Nabeel 54'; Hawar 65'

Suyumbayev Stadion, Osh
Attendance: 5,567
Referee: Yu Ming-hsun (Chinese Taipei)
22 April 2014
20:00 UTC+3

Shabab Al-Ordon (Jordan)	3–1	(Bahrain) Riffa
Khadr 6'; Zahran 36' (pen.); Al-Emlah 87'	Report	Shallal 85'

King Abdullah Stadium, Amman
Attendance: 100
Referee: Abdulrahman Al-Jassim (Qatar)

Notes

4. Teams from Iraq were not allowed to host their home matches in their country due to security concerns.

=== Group E ===
Team	Pld	W	D	L	GF	GA	GD	Pts	PSJ	CHB	HOM	NRA
(Indonesia) Persipura Jayapura	6	3	2	1	9	4	+5	11		2–0	0–2	3–0
(India) Churchill Brothers	6	3	1	2	10	7	+3	10 (Note: Tiebreakers: Churchill Brothers and Home United are ranked on head-to-head record.)	1–1		3–1	3–0
(Singapore) Home United	6	3	1	2	8	6	+2	10	1–1	2–1		2–0
(Maldives) New Radiant	6	1	0	5	2	12	−10	3	0–2	1–2	1–0	

Legend: Blue = home team win; Yellow = draw; Red = away team win.
Notes:
25 February 2014
16:00 UTC+9

Persipura Jayapura (Indonesia)	2–0	(India) Churchill Brothers
Solossa 48'; Pahabol 62'	Report

Mandala Stadium, Jayapura
Attendance: 9,000
Referee: Win Cho (Myanmar)
25 February 2014
16:00 UTC+5

New Radiant (Maldives)	1–0	(Singapore) Home United
Umair 53' (pen.)	Report

Galolhu National Stadium, Malé
Attendance: 5,200
Referee: Ng Kai Lam (Hong Kong)

11 March 2014
19:30 UTC+8

Home United (Singapore)	1–1	(Indonesia) Persipura Jayapura
Hanapi 26'	Report	Pahabol 74'

Jalan Besar Stadium, Singapore
Attendance: 2,085
Referee: Chris Beath (Australia)
11 March 2014
17:30 UTC+5:30

Churchill Brothers (India)	3–0	(Maldives) New Radiant
Lagos 31', 75'; Wolfe 53'	Report

Fatorda Stadium, Margao
Attendance: 1,500
Referee: Mohd Nafeez Abdul Wahab (Malaysia)

18 March 2014
16:00 UTC+9

Persipura Jayapura (Indonesia)	3–0	(Maldives) New Radiant
Kabes 43' (pen.); Wanggai 63', 68'	Report

Mandala Stadium, Jayapura
Attendance: 9,866
Referee: Fan Qi (China PR)
18 March 2014
17:30 UTC+5:30

Churchill Brothers (India)	3–1	(Singapore) Home United
Wolfe 16'; Raju 26'; B. Singh 90+1'	Report	Qiu Li 10'

Fatorda Stadium, Margao
Attendance: 1,000
Referee: Adham Makhadmeh (Jordan)

2 April 2014
16:00 UTC+5

New Radiant (Maldives)	0–2	(Indonesia) Persipura Jayapura
	Report	Solossa 37', 69'

Galolhu National Stadium, Malé
Attendance: 2,400
Referee: Tayeb Shamsuzzaman (Bangladesh)
2 April 2014
19:30 UTC+8

Home United (Singapore)	2–1	(India) Churchill Brothers
Nawaz 25'; Daud 72'	Report	Precious 27' (o.g.)

Jalan Besar Stadium, Singapore
Attendance: 1,020
Referee: Ma Ning (China PR)

9 April 2014
19:30 UTC+8

Home United (Singapore)	2–0	(Maldives) New Radiant
Qiu Li 28'; Castanheira 61'	Report

Jalan Besar Stadium, Singapore
Attendance: 1,348
Referee: Yudai Yamamoto (Japan)
9 April 2014
17:30 UTC+5:30

Churchill Brothers (India)	1–1	(Indonesia) Persipura Jayapura
B. Singh 84'	Report	Solossa 78'

Fatorda Stadium, Margao
Attendance: 200
Referee: Ng Kai Lam (Hong Kong)

23 April 2014
16:00 UTC+9

Persipura Jayapura (Indonesia)	0–2	(Singapore) Home United
	Report	Nawaz 14'; Jantan 23'

Mandala Stadium, Jayapura
Attendance: 12,525
Referee: Lee Min-hu (South Korea)
23 April 2014
18:30 UTC+5

New Radiant (Maldives)	1–2	(India) Churchill Brothers
Umair 40'	Report	Kumar 64'; Wolfe 67'

Galolhu National Stadium, Malé
Attendance: 1,500
Referee: Ali Shaban (Kuwait)

=== Group F ===
Team	Pld	W	D	L	GF	GA	GD	Pts	HNT	ARE	SEL	MAZ
(Vietnam) Hà Nội T&T	6	5	0	1	14	7	+7	15		2–1	1–0	5–1
(Indonesia) Arema Cronus	6	3	1	2	10	9	+1	10	1–3		1–0	3–2
(Malaysia) Selangor	6	2	2	2	9	6	+3	8	3–1	1–1		4–1
(Maldives) Maziya	6	0	1	5	7	18	−11	1	1–2	1–3	1–1	

Legend: Blue = home team win; Yellow = draw; Red = away team win.
25 February 2014
17:00 UTC+7

Hà Nội T&T (Vietnam)	5–1	(Maldives) Maziya
Nguyễn Văn Quyết 18', 75', 84'; Nguyễn Ngọc Duy 77'; Phạm Văn Thành 88'	Report	Nashid 43'

Hàng Đẫy Stadium, Hanoi
Attendance: 3,000
Referee: Muhammad Taqi Aljaafari Bin Jahari (Singapore)
25 February 2014
20:45 UTC+8

Selangor (Malaysia)	1–1	(Indonesia) Arema Cronus
Paulo Rangel 9'	Report	Igbonefo 72'

Majlis Perbandaran Selayang Stadium, Selayang
Attendance: 7,000
Referee: Wang Di (China PR)

11 March 2014
16:00 UTC+7

Arema Cronus (Indonesia)	1–3	(Vietnam) Hà Nội T&T
Gonzáles 27' (pen.)	Report	Marronkle 20', 33' (pen.); Nguyễn Văn Quyết 89'

Kanjuruhan Stadium, Malang
Attendance: 29,130
Referee: Ma Ning (China PR)
11 March 2014
16:00 UTC+5

Maziya (Maldives)	1–1	(Malaysia) Selangor
A. Mohamed 51' (pen.)	Report	Pantelidis 43'

Galolhu National Stadium, Malé
Attendance: 880
Referee: Mohammad Abu Loum (Jordan)

19 March 2014
17:00 UTC+7

Hà Nội T&T (Vietnam)	1–0	(Malaysia) Selangor
Nguyễn Văn Quyết 52'	Report

Hàng Đẫy Stadium, Hanoi
Attendance: 3,000
Referee: Jarred Gillett (Australia)
19 March 2014
16:00 UTC+5

Maziya (Maldives)	1–3	(Indonesia) Arema Cronus
Ali 25'	Report	Siswanto 14'; López 31'; Santoso 68'

Galolhu National Stadium, Malé
Attendance: 550
Referee: Rowan Arumughan (India)

1 April 2014
16:00 UTC+7

Arema Cronus (Indonesia)	3–2	(Maldives) Maziya
Gonzáles 25', 90+1'; López 26'	Report	Ali 62'; Ibrahim 65'

Kanjuruhan Stadium, Malang
Attendance: 25,000
Referee: Çarymyrat Gurbanow (Turkmenistan)
1 April 2014
20:45 UTC+8

Selangor (Malaysia)	3–1	(Vietnam) Hà Nội T&T
Paulo Rangel 21', 32', 43'	Report	Marronkle 36' (pen.)

Shah Alam Stadium, Shah Alam
Attendance: 2,500
Referee: Abdulrahman Al-Jassim (Qatar)

9 April 2014
16:00 UTC+5

Maziya (Maldives)	1–2	(Vietnam) Hà Nội T&T
A. Mohamed 59' (pen.)	Report	Marronkle 11' (pen.); Nguyễn Văn Quyết 22'

Galolhu National Stadium, Malé
Attendance: 105
Referee: Sukhbir Singh (Singapore)
16 April 2014
16:00 UTC+7

Arema Cronus (Indonesia)	1–0	(Malaysia) Selangor
López 45' (pen.)	Report

Kanjuruhan Stadium, Malang
Attendance: 23,629
Referee: Nivon Robesh Gamini (Sri Lanka)

23 April 2014
17:00 UTC+7

Hà Nội T&T (Vietnam)	2–1	(Indonesia) Arema Cronus
Nguyễn Ngọc Duy 68' (pen.), 75'	Report	Gonzáles 15'

Hàng Đẫy Stadium, Hanoi
Attendance: 2,000
Referee: Fan Qi (China PR)
23 April 2014
20:45 UTC+8

Selangor (Malaysia)	4–1	(Maldives) Maziya
Paulo Rangel 34', 63', 79'; Azmi 83'	Report	Abdulla 10'

Shah Alam Stadium, Shah Alam
Attendance: 500
Referee: Win Cho (Myanmar)

=== Group G ===
Team	Pld	W	D	L	GF	GA	GD	Pts	VNB	YAN	SCA	KEL
(Vietnam) Vissai Ninh Bình	6	5	1	0	18	7	+11	16		3–2	1–1	4–0
(Myanmar) Yangon United	6	3	0	3	16	17	−1	9	1–4		2–0	5–3
(Hong Kong) South China	6	2	1	3	11	11	0	7	1–3	5–3		4–0
(Malaysia) Kelantan	6	1	0	5	9	19	−10	3	2–3	2–3	2–0	

Legend: Blue = home team win; Yellow = draw; Red = away team win.
26 February 2014
16:00 UTC+6:30

Yangon United (Myanmar)	5–3	(Malaysia) Kelantan
Emerson 8', 45'; Kyaw Ko Ko 28', 52', 89'	Report	Zaharul 47'; Badhri 63', 90+4'

Thuwunna Stadium, Yangon
Attendance: 2,000
Referee: Lee Min-hu (South Korea)
26 February 2014
20:00 UTC+8

South China (Hong Kong)	1–3	(Vietnam) Vissai Ninh Bình
Chan Siu Ki 58'	Report	Bryan 12'; Đinh Văn Ta 26'; Tambwe 50'

Hong Kong Stadium, Hong Kong
Attendance: 2,188
Referee: Hettikamkanamge Perera (Sri Lanka)

12 March 2014
17:00 UTC+7

Vissai Ninh Bình (Vietnam)	3–2	(Myanmar) Yangon United
Đinh Văn Ta 12', 45' (pen.); Voinea 17'	Report	César 27', 89'

Ninh Bình Stadium, Ninh Bình
Attendance: 2,500
Referee: Pratap Singh (India)
12 March 2014
20:45 UTC+8

Kelantan (Malaysia)	2–0	(Hong Kong) South China
Zaharul 72'; Ghaddar 84'	Report

Sultan Mohammad IV Stadium, Kota Bharu
Attendance: 4,564
Referee: Dmitriy Mashentsev (Kyrgyzstan)

18 March 2014
16:00 UTC+6:30

Yangon United (Myanmar)	2–0	(Hong Kong) South China
César 36'; Emerson 77'	Report

Thuwunna Stadium, Yangon
Attendance: 2,000
Referee: Chaiya Mahapab (Thailand)
18 March 2014
20:45 UTC+8

Kelantan (Malaysia)	2–3	(Vietnam) Vissai Ninh Bình
Nazri 37'; Khairul 45+2'	Report	Bryan 24'; Tambwe 50'; Voinea 62'

Sultan Mohammad IV Stadium, Kota Bharu
Attendance: 1,500
Referee: Tayeb Shamsuzzaman (Bangladesh)

2 April 2014
17:00 UTC+7

Vissai Ninh Bình (Vietnam)	4–0	(Malaysia) Kelantan
Voinea 11'; Phan Anh Tuấn 52'; Lê Văn Thắng 76'; Bryan 80'	Report

Ninh Bình Stadium, Ninh Bình
Attendance: 4,000
Referee: Chris Beath (Australia)
2 April 2014
20:00 UTC+8

South China (Hong Kong)	5–3	(Myanmar) Yangon United
Michael 8'; Kajkut 15', 36'; Chan Siu Ki 56'; Lee Hong Lim 61'	Report	Kyaw Ko Ko 21'; David Htan 45+1'; César 76'

Mong Kok Stadium, Hong Kong
Attendance: 1,183
Referee: Jameel Abdulhusin (Bahrain)

8 April 2014
17:00 UTC+7

Vissai Ninh Bình (Vietnam)	1–1	(Hong Kong) South China
Phạm Văn Quý 86'	Report	Kajkut 32'

Ninh Bình Stadium, Ninh Bình
Attendance: 4,000
Referee: Rowan Arumughan (India)
8 April 2014
20:45 UTC+8

Kelantan (Malaysia)	2–3	(Myanmar) Yangon United
Khairul 50'; Zaharul 55'	Report	César 25'; Emerson 64'; Kyaw Ko Ko 80'

Sultan Mohammad IV Stadium, Kota Bharu
Attendance: 1,505
Referee: Yu Ming-hsun (Chinese Taipei)

22 April 2014
18:30 UTC+6:30

Yangon United (Myanmar)	1–4	(Vietnam) Vissai Ninh Bình
César 54' (pen.)	Report	Đinh Văn Ta 4', 85'; Bryan 6'; Hoàng Vissai 65' (pen.)

Thuwunna Stadium, Yangon
Attendance: 200
Referee: Ahmed Al-Kaf (Oman)
22 April 2014
20:00 UTC+8

South China (Hong Kong)	4–0	(Malaysia) Kelantan
Lee Hong Lim 42'; Barisic 75', 90+3'; Lo Kong Wai 82'	Report

Mong Kok Stadium, Hong Kong
Attendance: 1,798
Referee: Ilgiz Tantashev (Uzbekistan)

=== Group H ===
Team	Pld	W	D	L	GF	GA	GD	Pts	KIT	NPT	TAM	PUN
(Hong Kong) Kitchee	6	4	1	1	15	5	+10	13		2–0	4–0	2–2
(Myanmar) Nay Pyi Taw	6	2	2	2	10	10	0	8	1–2		3–1	3–3
(Singapore) Tampines Rovers	6	2	0	4	9	16	−7	6 (Note: Tiebreakers: Tampines Rovers and Pune are ranked on head-to-head record.)	0–5	0–1		3–1
(India) Pune	6	1	3	2	12	15	−3	6	2–0	2–2	2–5	

Legend: Blue = home team win; Yellow = draw; Red = away team win.
Notes:
26 February 2014
19:30 UTC+8

Tampines Rovers (Singapore)	0–5	(Hong Kong) Kitchee
	Report	Jordi 40', 45+1'; Chan Man Fai 47'; Xu Deshuai 56'; Belencoso 90'

Jalan Besar Stadium, Singapore
Attendance: 712
Referee: Nagor Amir Noor Mohamed (Malaysia)
26 February 2014
18:30 UTC+5:30

Pune (India)	2–2	(Myanmar) Nay Pyi Taw
Mustapha 9'; Pierre 88'	Report	Zaw Lin 17'; Khine Htoo 85'

Shree Shiv Chhatrapati Sports Complex, Pune
Attendance: 3,017
Referee: Vo Minh Tri (Vietnam)

12 March 2014
16:00 UTC+6:30

Nay Pyi Taw (Myanmar)	3–1	(Singapore) Tampines Rovers
Di Piedi 39'; Jung Yoon-sik 60', 67'	Report	Đurić 70'

Paung Laung Stadium, Naypyidaw
Attendance: 1,320
Referee: Yu Ming-hsun (Chinese Taipei)
12 March 2014
20:00 UTC+8

Kitchee (Hong Kong)	2–2	(India) Pune
Recio 29'; Belencoso 43'	Report	Pavlović 55'; Fernandes 74'

Mong Kok Stadium, Hong Kong
Attendance: 1,837
Referee: Chaiya Mahapab (Thailand)

19 March 2014
19:30 UTC+8

Tampines Rovers (Singapore)	3–1	(India) Pune
Mrdaković 38', 69'; Closa 62'	Report	Mustapha 16' (pen.)

Jalan Besar Stadium, Singapore
Attendance: 778
Referee: Wang Di (China PR)
19 March 2014
20:00 UTC+8

Kitchee (Hong Kong)	2–0	(Myanmar) Nay Pyi Taw
Belencoso 8', 46'	Report

Mong Kok Stadium, Hong Kong
Attendance: 1,850
Referee: Nivon Robesh Gamini (Sri Lanka)

1 April 2014
16:00 UTC+6:30

Nay Pyi Taw (Myanmar)	1–2	(Hong Kong) Kitchee
Delgado 12'	Report	Chan Man Fai 6'; Belencoso 80'

Paung Laung Stadium, Naypyidaw
Attendance: 850
Referee: Ilgiz Tantashev (Uzbekistan)
1 April 2014
19:00 UTC+5:30

Pune (India)	2–5	(Singapore) Tampines Rovers
Mustapha 12'; D'Souza 14'	Report	Mrdaković 5'; Ali 43'; Đurić 57', 69'; Fahrudin 60' (pen.)

Shree Shiv Chhatrapati Sports Complex, Pune
Attendance: 2,013
Referee: Yaqoob Abdul Baki (Oman)

8 April 2014
16:00 UTC+6:30

Nay Pyi Taw (Myanmar)	3–3	(India) Pune
Aung Kyaw Naing 41'; Nyein Tayzar Win 62'; Khine Htoo 72'	Report	Haokip 36'; Izumi 55'; Angus 80'

Paung Laung Stadium, Naypyidaw
Attendance: 464
Referee: Mohd Nafeez Abdul Wahab (Malaysia)
8 April 2014
20:00 UTC+8

Kitchee (Hong Kong)	4–0	(Singapore) Tampines Rovers
Belencoso 35', 62', 85'; Jordi 82'	Report

Mong Kok Stadium, Hong Kong
Attendance: 1,611
Referee: Tayeb Shamsuzzaman (Bangladesh)

22 April 2014
19:30 UTC+8

Tampines Rovers (Singapore)	0–1	(Myanmar) Nay Pyi Taw
	Report	Delgado 79'

Jalan Besar Stadium, Singapore
Attendance: 1,301
Referee: Jarred Gillett (Australia)
22 April 2014
17:00 UTC+5:30

Pune (India)	2–0	(Hong Kong) Kitchee
Ralte 74', 80'	Report

Shree Shiv Chhatrapati Sports Complex, Pune
Attendance: 1,317
Referee: Ali Sabah Al-Qaysi (Iraq)
