= 2014 AFC Cup =

11th secondary club football tournament organized by the AFC

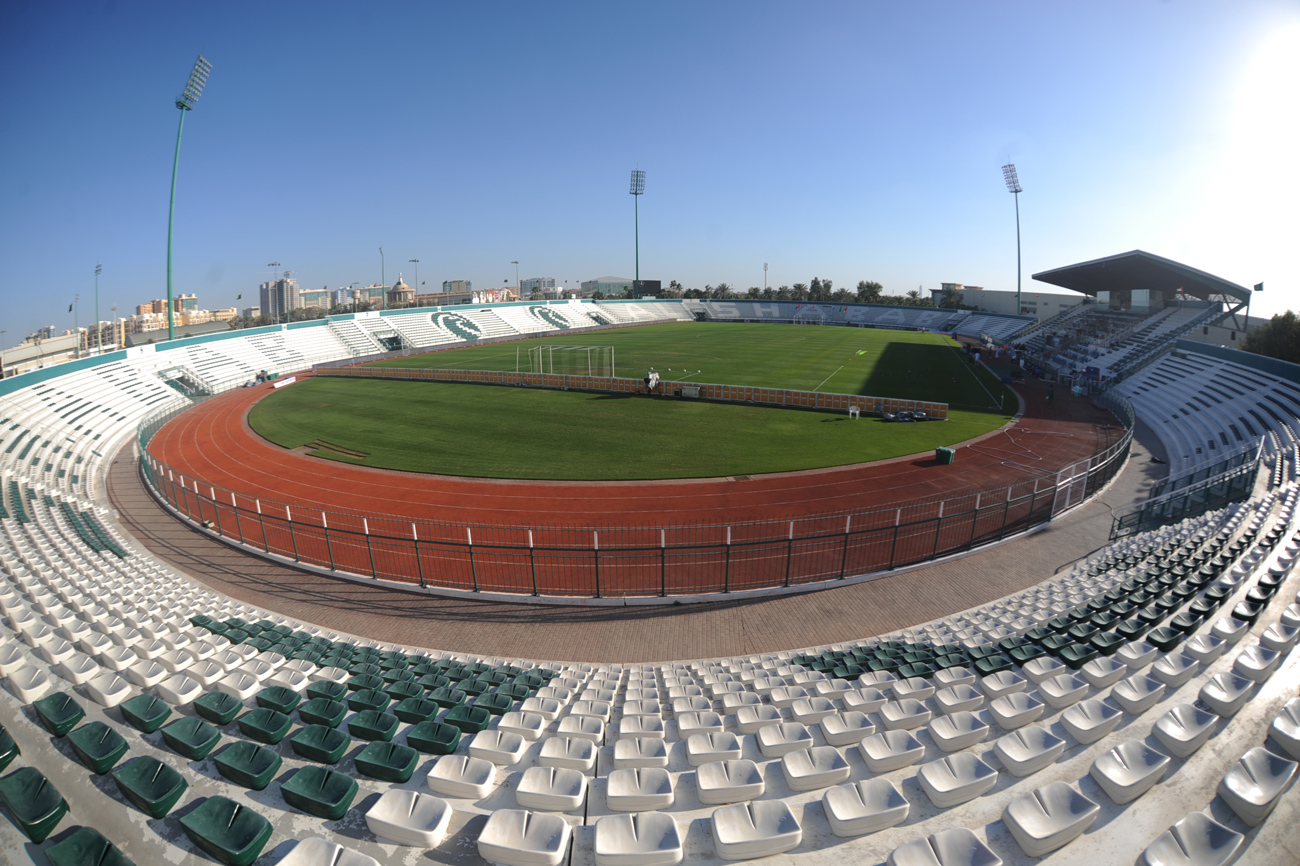
- The Maktoum Bin Rashid Al Maktoum Stadium in Dubai hosted the final

Tournament details
- Dates: 2 February – 18 October 2014
- Teams: 34 (from 19 associations)

Final positions
- Champions: (Kuwait) Al-Qadsia (1st title)
- Runners-up: (Iraq) Erbil

Tournament statistics
- Matches played: 119
- Goals scored: 369 (3.1 per match)
- Attendance: 336,085 (2,824 per match)
- Top scorer: (Spain) Juan Belencoso (11 goals)
- Best player: (Kuwait) Saif Al Hashan

The 2014 AFC Cup was the 11th edition of the AFC Cup, a football competition organized by the Asian Football Confederation (AFC) for clubs from "developing countries" in Asia. Al-Kuwait were the two-time defending champions, but were eliminated by Persipura Jayapura in the quarter-finals.

In the final, Al-Qadsia of Kuwait defeated Erbil of Iraq 4–2 on penalties after a 0–0 draw in regulation time, to win their first AFC Cup title after losing in the previous year's final.

== Association team allocation ==
The AFC laid out the procedure for deciding the participating associations and the allocation of slots, with the final decision to be made by the AFC on 26 November 2013. The following changes to the list of participating associations may be made from the 2013 AFC Cup if the AFC approves the following applications made by any association:

- An association originally participating in the AFC Cup may apply to participate in the 2014 AFC Champions League. An association may participate in both the AFC Champions League and the AFC Cup if it only partially fulfills the AFC Champions League criteria.
- An association originally participating in the AFC President's Cup may apply to participate in the 2014 AFC Cup.

The following changes in the participating associations were made compared to the previous year:

- Kyrgyzstan and Palestine clubs' participation were upgraded from the AFC President's Cup to the AFC Cup starting from 2014 by the AFC.

Each participating association was given either two entries to the group stage or one entry to the qualifying play-off, based on the AFC Technical Ranking and the number of associations in each zone.

Evaluation for 2014 AFC Cup
Ranked top 23, allocated two direct slots
Ranked 24–34, allocated two direct slots
Ranked 24–34, allocated one play-off slot

West Asia Zone
Rank	Member Association	Slots	
Rank	Member Association	Group stage	Play-off
10	Jordan	2	0
11	Kuwait	2	0
13	Iraq	2	0
14	Syria	2	0
15	Oman	2	0
16	Bahrain	2	0
18	Lebanon	2	0
26	Tajikistan	0	1
31	Palestine	0	1
32	Kyrgyzstan	0	1
33	Yemen	0	1
Total		14	4

East Asia Zone
Rank	Member Association	Slots	
Rank	Member Association	Group stage	Play-off
17	Vietnam	2	0
19	Hong Kong	2	0
20	Indonesia	2	0
21	Singapore	2	0
22	Malaysia	2	0
23	India	2	0
25	Maldives	2	0
27	Myanmar	2	0
Total		16	0

== Teams ==
The following teams entered the competition. Teams in italics played in the 2014 AFC Champions League qualifying play-off, but failed to advance to the AFC Champions League group stage (had they advanced to the AFC Champions League group stage, they would have been replaced by another team from the same association).

West Asia Zone
Team	Qualifying method	App	Last App
Group stage direct entrants (Groups A–D)
(Bahrain) Al-Hidd	2012–13 Bahrain First Division League 3rd place	1st	none
(Bahrain) Riffa	2012–13 Bahrain First Division League 4th place	3nd	2013
(Iraq) Al-Shorta	2012–13 Iraqi Elite League champions	1st	none
(Iraq) Erbil	2012–13 Iraqi Elite League runners-up	5th	2013
(Jordan) Shabab Al-Ordon	2012–13 Jordan League champions	4th	2010
(Jordan) That Ras	2012–13 Jordan FA Cup winners	1st	none
Al-Kuwait	2012–13 Kuwaiti Premier League champions	6th	2013
(Kuwait) Al-Qadsia	2013 Kuwait Emir Cup winners	5th	2013
(Lebanon) Safa	2012–13 Lebanese Premier League champions 2012–13 Lebanese FA Cup winners	5th	2013
(Lebanon) Al-Nejmeh	2012–13 Lebanese Premier League runners-up	6th	2010
(Oman) Al-Suwaiq	2012–13 Oman Elite League champions 2012–13 Sultan Qaboos Cup winners	4th	2012
(Oman) Fanja	2012–13 Oman Elite League runners-up	2nd	2013
(Syria) Al-Jaish	2013 Syrian Premier League champions	4th	2011
(Syria) Al-Wahda	2013 Syrian Cup winners	3rd	2013
Qualifying play-off participants
(Kyrgyzstan) Alay Osh	2013 Kyrgyzstan League champions	1st	none
(Palestine) Shabab Al-Dhahiriya	2012–13 West Bank Premier League champions	1st	none
(Tajikistan) Ravshan Kulob	2013 Tajik League champions	2nd	2013
(Yemen) Al-Yarmuk Al-Rawda	2013 Yemeni League champions	1st	none

East Asia Zone
Team	Qualifying method	App	Last App
Group stage direct entrants (Groups E–H)
(Hong Kong) South China	2012–13 Hong Kong First Division League champions	5th	2011
(Hong Kong) Kitchee	2012–13 Hong Kong season play-off winners	4th	2013
(India) Pune	2012–13 I-League runners-up	1st	none
(India) Churchill Brothers	2012–13 I-League champions	3rd	2013
(Indonesia) Persipura Jayapura	2013 Indonesia Super League champions	2nd	2011
(Indonesia) Arema Cronus	2013 Indonesia Super League runners-up	2nd	2012
(Malaysia) Selangor	2013 Malaysia Super League runners-up	4th	2013
(Malaysia) Kelantan	2013 Malaysia FA Cup winners	3rd	2013
(Maldives) New Radiant	2013 Dhivehi League champions 2013 Maldives FA Cup winners	6th	2013
(Maldives) Maziya	2013 Dhivehi League runners-up	2nd	2013
(Myanmar) Yangon United	2013 Myanmar National League champions	3rd	2013
(Myanmar) Nay Pyi Taw	2013 Myanmar National League runners-up	1st	none
(Singapore) Tampines Rovers	2013 S.League champions	7th	2013
(Singapore) Home United	2013 Singapore Cup winners	7th	2012
(Vietnam) Hà Nội T&T	2013 V.League 1 champions	2nd	2011
(Vietnam) Vissai Ninh Bình	2013 Vietnamese Cup winners	1st	none

Notes

1. India (IND): Since the submission deadline came before the Indian Federation Cup, the league runners-up were chosen to represent India in the AFC Cup.
2. Indonesia (IDN): Persipura Jayapura and Arema Cronus, the 2013 Indonesia Super League champions and runners-up respectively, were chosen to represent Indonesia in the AFC Cup.
3. Malaysia (MAS): Since LionsXII, a side managed by the Football Association of Singapore and thus ineligible to represent Malaysia in continental competition, won the 2013 Malaysia Super League, the league runners-up were chosen to represent Malaysia in the AFC Cup.
4. Myanmar (MYA): Since the MFF Cup had to be cancelled due to tightness of schedule in preparation for the 2013 Southeast Asian Games, the league runners-up were chosen to represent Myanmar in the AFC Cup.
Location of teams of the 2014 AFC Cup.
West Asia Zone
East Asia Zone
(p) Qualifying play-off participants

== Schedule ==
The schedule of the competition was as follows (all draws held at AFC headquarters in Kuala Lumpur, Malaysia).

Phase	Round	Draw date	First leg	Second leg
Qualifying play-off	Round 1	No draw	2 February 2014	
Group stage	Matchday 1	10 December 2013	25–26 February 2014	
Group stage	Matchday 2	10 December 2013	11–12 March 2014	
Group stage	Matchday 3	10 December 2013	18–19 March 2014	
Group stage	Matchday 4	10 December 2013	1–2 April 2014	
Group stage	Matchday 5	10 December 2013	8–9 April 2014	
Group stage	Matchday 6	10 December 2013	22–23 April 2014	
Knock-out stage	Round of 16	10 December 2013	13–14 May 2014	
Knock-out stage	Quarter-finals	28 May 2014	19 August 2014	26 August 2014
Knock-out stage	Semi-finals	28 May 2014	16 September 2014	30 September 2014
Knock-out stage	Final	28 May 2014	18 October 2014 at Maktoum Bin Rashid Al Maktoum Stadium, Dubai	

== Qualifying play-off ==
The bracket for the qualifying play-off was determined by the AFC. Each tie was played as a single match. Extra time and penalty shoot-out were used to decide the winner if necessary. The winners of each tie advanced to the group stage to join the 30 automatic qualifiers.

Team 1	Score	Team 2
Ravshan Kulob (Tajikistan)	2–1	(Yemen) Al-Yarmuk Al-Rawda
Shabab Al-Dhahiriya (Palestine)	1–1 (a.e.t.) (7–8 p)	(Kyrgyzstan) Alay Osh

== Group stage ==
The draw for the group stage was held on 10 December 2013. The 32 teams were drawn into eight groups of four. Teams from the same association could not be drawn into the same group. Each group was played on a home-and-away round-robin basis. The winners and runners-up of each group advanced to the round of 16.

Tiebreakers

The teams are ranked according to points (3 points for a win, 1 point for a draw, 0 points for a loss). If tied on points, tiebreakers are applied in the following order:

1. Greater number of points obtained in the group matches between the teams concerned
2. Goal difference resulting from the group matches between the teams concerned
3. Greater number of goals scored in the group matches between the teams concerned (away goals do not apply)
4. Goal difference in all the group matches
5. Greater number of goals scored in all the group matches
6. Penalty shoot-out if only two teams are involved and they are both on the field of play
7. Fewer score calculated according to the number of yellow and red cards received in the group matches (1 point for a single yellow card, 3 points for a red card as a consequence of two yellow cards, 3 points for a direct red card, 4 points for a yellow card followed by a direct red card)
8. Drawing of lots

=== Group A ===
Team	Pld	W	D	L	GF	GA	GD	Pts	SAF	THR	SUW	RAV
(Lebanon) Safa	6	5	1	0	13	1	+12	16		1–0	1–0	8–0
(Jordan) That Ras	6	3	2	1	9	4	+5	11	0–0		1–0	5–1
(Oman) Al-Suwaiq	6	2	1	3	8	4	+4	7	0–1	0–0		3–1
(Tajikistan) Ravshan Kulob	6	0	0	6	5	26	−21	0	1–2	2–3	0–5	

=== Group B ===
Team	Pld	W	D	L	GF	GA	GD	Pts	KUW	NEJ	FAN	JAI
Al-Kuwait	6	4	1	1	12	4	+8	13		2–1	4–0	2–0
(Lebanon) Al-Nejmeh	6	2	3	1	4	3	+1	9	1–1		1–0	0–0
(Oman) Fanja	6	1	3	2	2	6	−4	6	2–1	0–0		0–0
(Syria) Al-Jaish	6	0	3	3	0	5	−5	3	0–2	0–1	0–0	

=== Group C ===
Team	Pld	W	D	L	GF	GA	GD	Pts	QAD	HID	SHO	WAH
(Kuwait) Al-Qadsia	6	3	2	1	11	5	+6	11 (Note: Tiebreakers: Al-Qadsia and Al-Hidd are ranked on head-to-head record.)		2–0	3–0	1–1
(Bahrain) Al-Hidd	6	3	2	1	10	6	+4	11	3–2		0–0	3–1
(Iraq) Al-Shorta	6	1	4	1	3	4	−1	7	0–0	0–0		0–0
(Syria) Al-Wahda	6	0	2	4	5	14	−9	2	1–3	1–4	1–3	

Notes:

Tiebreakers

- Al-Qadsia and Al-Hidd are ranked on head-to-head record.

=== Group D ===
Team	Pld	W	D	L	GF	GA	GD	Pts	ERB	RIF	ORD	ALA
(Iraq) Erbil	6	5	0	1	19	5	+14	15		1–2	3–2	6–0
(Bahrain) Riffa	6	3	1	2	7	7	0	10	0–3		2–0	2–0
(Jordan) Shabab Al-Ordon	6	3	0	3	9	10	−1	9	1–3	3–1		2–1
(Kyrgyzstan) Alay Osh	6	0	1	5	1	14	−13	1	0–3	0–0	0–1	

=== Group E ===
Team	Pld	W	D	L	GF	GA	GD	Pts	PSJ	CHB	HOM	NRA
(Indonesia) Persipura Jayapura	6	3	2	1	9	4	+5	11		2–0	0–2	3–0
(India) Churchill Brothers	6	3	1	2	10	7	+3	10 (Note: Tiebreakers: Churchill Brothers and Home United are ranked on head-to-head record.)	1–1		3–1	3–0
(Singapore) Home United	6	3	1	2	8	6	+2	10	1–1	2–1		2–0
(Maldives) New Radiant	6	1	0	5	2	12	−10	3	0–2	1–2	1–0	

Notes:

Tiebreakers

- Churchill Brothers and Home United are ranked on head-to-head record.

=== Group F ===
Team	Pld	W	D	L	GF	GA	GD	Pts	HNT	ARE	SEL	MAZ
(Vietnam) Hà Nội T&T	6	5	0	1	14	7	+7	15		2–1	1–0	5–1
(Indonesia) Arema Cronus	6	3	1	2	10	9	+1	10	1–3		1–0	3–2
(Malaysia) Selangor	6	2	2	2	9	6	+3	8	3–1	1–1		4–1
(Maldives) Maziya	6	0	1	5	7	18	−11	1	1–2	1–3	1–1	

=== Group G ===
Team	Pld	W	D	L	GF	GA	GD	Pts	VNB	YAN	SCA	KEL
(Vietnam) Vissai Ninh Bình	6	5	1	0	18	7	+11	16		3–2	1–1	4–0
(Myanmar) Yangon United	6	3	0	3	16	17	−1	9	1–4		2–0	5–3
(Hong Kong) South China	6	2	1	3	11	11	0	7	1–3	5–3		4–0
(Malaysia) Kelantan	6	1	0	5	9	19	−10	3	2–3	2–3	2–0	

=== Group H ===
Team	Pld	W	D	L	GF	GA	GD	Pts	KIT	NPT	TAM	PUN
(Hong Kong) Kitchee	6	4	1	1	15	5	+10	13		2–0	4–0	2–2
(Myanmar) Nay Pyi Taw	6	2	2	2	10	10	0	8	1–2		3–1	3–3
(Singapore) Tampines Rovers	6	2	0	4	9	16	−7	6 (Note: Tiebreakers: Tampines Rovers and Pune are ranked on head-to-head record.)	0–5	0–1		3–1
(India) Pune	6	1	3	2	12	15	−3	6	2–0	2–2	2–5	

Notes:

Tiebreakers

- Tampines Rovers and Pune are ranked on head-to-head record.

== Knock-out stage ==
In the knock-out stage, the 16 teams played a single-elimination tournament. In the quarter-finals and semi-finals, each tie was played on a home-and-away two-legged basis, while in the round of 16 and final, each tie was played as a single match. The away goals rule (for two-legged ties), extra time (away goals do not apply in extra time) and penalty shoot-out were used to decide the winner if necessary.

=== Bracket ===
Round of 16
(Vietnam) Hà Nội T&T	5
(Myanmar) Nay Pyi Taw	0
(Iraq) Erbil (p)	0 (3)
(Lebanon) Al-Nejmeh	0 (0)
(Vietnam) Vissai Ninh Bình	4
(India) Churchill Brothers	2
(Hong Kong) Kitchee	2
(Indonesia) Arema Cronus	0
(Kuwait) Al-Qadsia	4
(Jordan) That Ras	0
(Lebanon) Safa	0
(Bahrain) Al-Hidd	1
Al-Kuwait	3
(Bahrain) Riffa	0
(Indonesia) Persipura Jayapura	9
(Myanmar) Yangon United	2

Quarter-finals
(Vietnam) Hà Nội T&T	0	0	0
(Iraq) Erbil	1	2	3
(Vietnam) Vissai Ninh Bình	2	1	3
(Hong Kong) Kitchee	4	0	4
(Kuwait) Al-Qadsia (a)	1	2	3
(Bahrain) Al-Hidd	1	2	3
Al-Kuwait	3	1	4
(Indonesia) Persipura Jayapura	2	6	8

Semi-finals
(Iraq) Erbil	1	2	3
(Hong Kong) Kitchee	1	1	2
(Kuwait) Al-Qadsia	4	6	10
(Indonesia) Persipura Jayapura	2	0	2

Final
(Iraq) Erbil	0 (2)
(Kuwait) Al-Qadsia (p)	0 (4)

=== Round of 16 ===
In the round of 16, the winners of one group played the runners-up of another group in the same zone, with the group winners hosting the match.

Team 1	Score	Team 2
West Asia Zone
Safa (Lebanon)	0–1	(Bahrain) Al-Hidd
Al-Qadsia (Kuwait)	4–0	(Jordan) That Ras
Al-Kuwait	3–0	(Bahrain) Riffa
Erbil (Iraq)	0–0 (a.e.t.) (3–0 p)	(Lebanon) Al-Nejmeh
East Asia Zone
Persipura Jayapura (Indonesia)	9–2	(Myanmar) Yangon United
Vissai Ninh Bình (Vietnam)	4–2	(India) Churchill Brothers
Hà Nội T&T (Vietnam)	5–0	(Myanmar) Nay Pyi Taw
Kitchee (Hong Kong)	2–0	(Indonesia) Arema Cronus

=== Quarter-finals ===
The draw for the quarter-finals was held on 28 May 2014. Teams from different zones could be drawn into the same tie, and the "country protection" rule was applied, so teams from the same association cannot be drawn into the same tie.

Team 1	Agg.	Team 2	1st leg	2nd leg
Hà Nội T&T (Vietnam)	0–3	(Iraq) Erbil	0–1	0–2
Vissai Ninh Bình (Vietnam)	3–4	(Hong Kong) Kitchee	2–4	1–0
Al-Qadsia (Kuwait)	3–3 (a)	(Bahrain) Al-Hidd	1–1	2–2
Al-Kuwait	4–8	(Indonesia) Persipura Jayapura	3–2	1–6

=== Semi-finals ===
Team 1	Agg.	Team 2	1st leg	2nd leg
Erbil (Iraq)	3–2	(Hong Kong) Kitchee	1–1	2–1
Al-Qadsia (Kuwait)	10–2	(Indonesia) Persipura Jayapura	4–2	6–0

=== Final ===
The draw to decide the host team of the final was held after the quarter-final draw.

18 October 2014
20:00 UTC+4

Erbil (Iraq)	0–0 (a.e.t.)	(Kuwait) Al-Qadsia
	Report
Penalties
Radhi (penalty scored); Hawar (penalty missed); Barzan (penalty scored); Faez (penalty missed)	2–4	(penalty scored) Al-Mutawa; (penalty missed) Said; (penalty scored) Al Ansari; (penalty scored) El Ebrahim; (penalty scored) Subotić

Maktoum Bin Rashid Al Maktoum Stadium, Dubai (United Arab Emirates)
Attendance: 5,240
Referee: Kim Dong-jin (South Korea)

Notes

4. Teams from Iraq were not allowed to host their home matches in their country due to security concerns.

== Awards ==
Award	Player	Team
Most Valuable Player	(Kuwait) Saif Al Hashan	(Kuwait) Al-Qadsia
Top Goalscorer	(Spain) Juan Belencoso	(Hong Kong) Kitchee

== Top scorers ==
Rank	Player	Team	MD1	MD2	MD3	MD4	MD5	MD6	R16	QF1	QF2	SF1	SF2	F	Total
1	(Spain) Juan Belencoso	(Hong Kong) Kitchee	1	1	2	1	3			2		1			11
2	(Syria) Omar Al Soma	(Kuwait) Al-Qadsia		1	1	1	3		1						7
2	(Brazil) César	(Myanmar) Yangon United		2	1	1	1	1	1						7
2	(Brazil) Paulo Rangel	(Malaysia) Selangor	1			3		3							7
5	(Myanmar) Kyaw Ko Ko	(Myanmar) Yangon United	3			1	1		1						6
5	(Vietnam) Nguyễn Văn Quyết	(Vietnam) Hà Nội T&T	3	1	1		1								6
5	(Indonesia) Boaz Solossa	(Indonesia) Persipura Jayapura	1			2	1				1	1			6
8	(Kuwait) Saif Al Hashan	(Kuwait) Al-Qadsia		1	1				1			1	1		5
8	(Kuwait) Bader Al-Mutawa	(Kuwait) Al-Qadsia							1	1		1	2		5
8	(Vietnam) Đinh Văn Ta	(Vietnam) Vissai Ninh Bình	1	2				2							5
8	(Liberia) Boakay Eddie Foday	(Indonesia) Persipura Jayapura							5						5
8	(Spain) Borja Rubiato	(Iraq) Erbil			1	2	1	1							5

Note: Goals scored in qualifying play-off not counted (see regulations, Article 74c).

== See also ==
- 2014 AFC Champions League
- 2014 AFC President's Cup
