= 2014 AFC Cup qualifying play-off =

The qualifying play-off of the 2014 AFC Cup was played on 2 February 2014, to decide two of the 32 places in the group stage.

== Format ==
The bracket for the qualifying play-off was determined by the AFC. Each tie was played as a single match. Extra time and penalty shoot-out were used to decide the winner if necessary. The winners of each advanced to the group stage to join the 30 automatic qualifiers.

== Teams ==
The following four teams (all from West Asia Zone) were entered into the qualifying play-off:

Zone	Teams
West Asia Zone	(Kyrgyzstan) Alay Osh; (Palestine) Shabab Al-Dhahiriya; (Tajikistan) Ravshan Kulob; (Yemen) Al-Yarmuk Al-Rawda

== Matches ==
Team 1	Score	Team 2
Ravshan Kulob (Tajikistan)	2–1	(Yemen) Al-Yarmuk Al-Rawda
Shabab Al-Dhahiriya (Palestine)	1–1 (a.e.t.) (7–8 p)	(Kyrgyzstan) Alay Osh

2 February 2014
13:00 UTC+5

Ravshan Kulob (Tajikistan)	2–1	(Yemen) Al-Yarmuk Al-Rawda
Hakimov 81' (pen.); Takyi 85'	Report	Al Abidi 62'

Stadium Metallurg 1st District, Tursunzoda
Attendance: 5,000
Referee: Mohd Amirul Izwan Bin Yaacob (Malaysia)

2 February 2014
16:00 UTC+2

Shabab Al-Dhahiriya (Palestine)	1–1 (a.e.t.)	(Kyrgyzstan) Alay Osh
Sarhan 45+2'	Report	Alimov 40'
Penalties
Kabha (penalty scored); Zidan (penalty scored); Manaa (penalty missed); Battat (penalty scored); Maher (penalty scored); Al-Sbakhy (penalty scored); Abu Bilal (penalty scored); Mahajna (penalty scored); Haloon (penalty missed)	7–8	(penalty scored) Alimov; (penalty scored) Rakhmonov; (penalty scored) Verevkin; (penalty missed) Mirzaliev; (penalty scored) Beldinov; (penalty scored) Muladjanov; (penalty scored) Shakirov; (penalty scored) Akhmedov; (penalty scored) Shumeyko

Dora International Stadium, Hebron
Attendance: 7,000
Referee: Yudai Yamamoto (Japan)
