= Hasan Sarhan =

Israeli footballer

Hasan Sarhan حسن سرحان
Personal information
- Full name: Hasan Sarhan
- Date of birth: April 30, 1993 (age 33)
- Place of birth: Majd al-Krum, Israel
- Position: Forward

Youth career
- 2007–2012: Maccabi Netanya

Senior career*
Years	Team	Apps	(Gls)
2012–2014	Maccabi Netanya	0	(0)
2013–2014	→ Bnei Majd al-Krum (loan)	14	(6)
2014	Shabab Al-Dhahiriya		
2014–2015	Ihud Bnei Majd al-Krum	9	(0)
2015	Hapoel Iksal	3	(0)
2016	Hapoel Bnei Rameh	16	(16)
2016	Hapoel Kaukab	1	(0)
2016–2017	Ihud Bnei Majd al-Krum	2	(0)
2016	→ Ahi Bir al-Maksur (loan)	3	(1)
2016–2017	→ Ahva Arraba (loan)	19	(1)
- * Club domestic league appearances and goals

Hasan Sarhan (Arabic: حسن سرحان, Hebrew: חסן סרחאן; born 30 April 1993) is an Israeli footballer.
