= Mohammad Al-Dawoud =

Jordanian footballer

Personal information
- Full name: Mohammad Rateb Al-Dawoud
- Date of birth: 12 April 1992 (age 34)
- Place of birth: Ar-Ramtha, Jordan
- Height: 1.77 m (5 ft 10 in)
- Position: Midfielder

Team information
- Current team: Al-Wehdat
- Number: 76

Youth career
- 2006–2011: Al-Ramtha

Senior career*
Years	Team	Apps	(Gls)
2011–2018	Al-Ramtha		
2014–2017	→ Hidd (loan)		
2018–2020	Hidd		
2020–2023	Al-Salt		
2023–2025	Al-Hussein		
2025	Al-Faisaly	5	(0)
2026–	Al-Wehdat	15	(6)

International career^{‡}
2012–2014	Jordan U-22		
2011–	Jordan	7	(1)
- * Club domestic league appearances and goals as of 8 May 2026 ‡ National team caps and goals as of 12 June 2026

Mohammad Rateb Al-Dawoud (Arabic: مُحَمَّد رَاتِب الدَّاوُود; born 12 April 1992) is a Jordanian professional footballer who plays as a midfielder for Jordanian Pro League club Al-Wehdat and the Jordan national team.

== International career ==
Al-Dawoud's first match with the Jordan national senior team was against Libya in Doha on 17 December 2011 in the 2011 Pan Arab Games, which resulted in a 0–0 draw.

== Personal life ==
Al-Dawoud is the son of Rateb Al-Dawoud, who also played for Al-Ramtha and the Jordan national team.

== Career statistics ==
=== With U-22 ===
#	Date	Venue	Opponent	Score	Result	Competition
1	19 May 2013	Cairo	Egypt U-19	4-0	Win	Friendly

=== With senior team ===
Scores and results list Jordan's goal tally first.

No.	Date	Venue	Opponent	Score	Result	Competition
1.	31 March 2026	Mardan Sports Complex, Antalya, Türkiye	Nigeria	2–2	2–2	Friendly
