= Borja Rubiato =

Spanish footballer

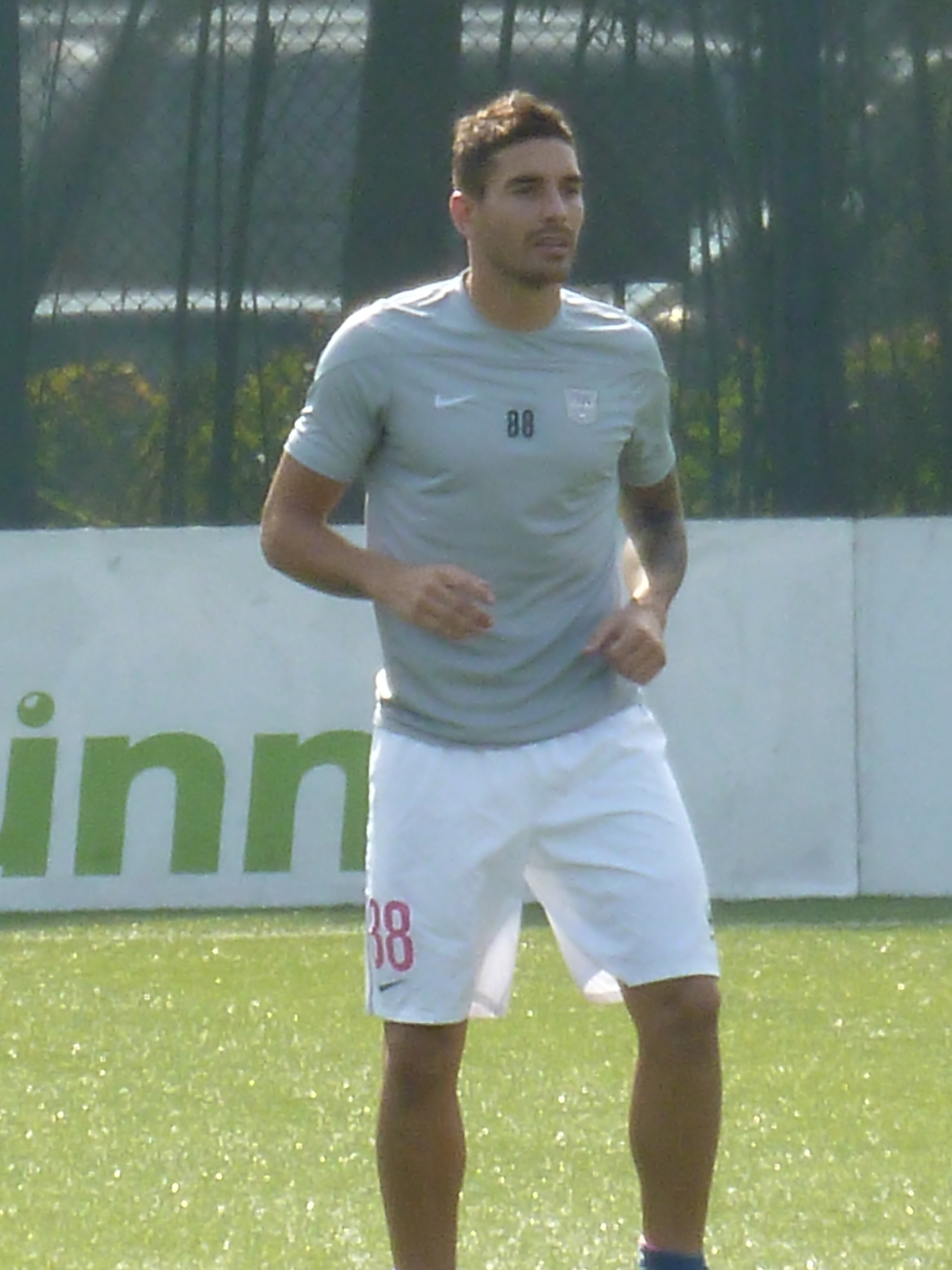

Personal information
- Full name: Borja Rubiato Martínez
- Date of birth: 13 November 1984 (age 41)
- Place of birth: Madrid, Spain
- Height: 1.85 m (6 ft 1 in)
- Position: Striker

Senior career*
Years	Team	Apps	(Gls)
2003–2004	Las Rozas	35	(17)
2004–2006	Osasuna B	43	(5)
2006	Getafe B	2	(0)
2006–2007	Cobeña	32	(14)
2007–2008	Atlético Madrid B	33	(17)
2008–2010	Cádiz	26	(6)
2009–2010	→ Huesca (loan)	23	(3)
2010–2012	Oviedo	47	(7)
2012–2013	Zamora	17	(8)
2013	Alcalá	15	(4)
2013–2014	San Antonio Scorpions	9	(0)
2014	Erbil	3	(4)
2014	Marbella	18	(4)
2015	Kitchee	6	(0)
2015	Trival Valderas	11	(2)
2016	Olímpic Xàtiva	15	(2)
2016–2017	Mensajero	25	(5)
2017	Ebro	15	(4)
2018–2019	Arandina	35	(19)
2019–2020	Zamora	21	(4)
2020–2021	Ávila	10	(5)

Managerial career
- 2021–2023: Ávila
- * Club domestic league appearances and goals

Borja Rubiato Martínez (born 13 November 1984 in Madrid) is a Spanish former professional footballer who played as a striker.

== Club statistics ==
As of 13 May 2015

Club	Season	League			Cup		Other		Total	
Club	Season	Division	Apps	Goals	Apps	Goals	Apps	Goals	Apps	Goals
Osasuna B	2004–05	Segunda División B	28	3	—		—		28	3
Osasuna B	2005–06	Segunda División B	15	2	—		—		15	2
Osasuna B	Total		43	5	—		—		43	5
Cobeña	2006–07	Segunda División B	32	14	—		—		32	14
Atlético B	2007–08	Segunda División B	33	17	—		—		33	17
Cádiz	2008–09	Segunda División B	26	6	1	0	4 (Note: Appearances in Promotion Play-offs)	3	31	9
Huesca (loan)	2009–10	Segunda División	23	3	2	0	—		25	3
Oviedo	2010–11	Segunda División B	24	5	—		—		24	5
Oviedo	2011–12	Segunda División B	23	2	4	2	—		27	4
Oviedo	Total		47	7	4	2	—		51	9
Zamora	2012–13	Segunda División B	17	8	—		—		17	8
Alcalá	2012–13	Segunda División B	15	4	—		—		15	4
San Antonio Scorpions	2013	North American Soccer League	9	0	0	0	—		9	0
Erbil	2013–14	Iraqi Premier League			0	0	4 (Note: Appearances in AFC Cup)	5	4	5
Marbella	2014–15	Segunda División B	18	4	1	0	—		19	4
Kitchee	2014–15	Hong Kong Premier League	6	0	4	0	—		10	0
Career total			269	68	12	2	8	8	289	78
