= Orok Akarandut =

Nigerian football player

Urok Akarandut Nicodemus
Personal information
- Full name: Orok Akarandut
- Date of birth: March 18, 1987 (age 39)
- Place of birth: Uyo, Nigeria
- Height: 1.78 m (5 ft 10 in)
- Position: Striker

Senior career*
Years	Team	Apps	(Gls)
2007–2009	Akwa United F.C.	41	(24)
2009–2012	CS Sfaxien		
2010–2011	→ AS Gabès (loan)	18	(2)
2011–2012	→ Emirates Club (loan)	9	(2)
2012–2014	Stade Tunisien	16	(6)
2014–2020	Al-Hidd	32	(15)
2020–	Akwa United		
- * Club domestic league appearances and goals

Orok Akarandut (born March 18, 1987, in Uyo, Akwa Ibom State) is a Nigerian football player.

== Career ==
Akarandut began his career with Akwa United F.C. who in January 2007 was promoted to the Nigerian Premier League. In the 2008–09 season, he was the league's top goalscorer with 17 goals, which tied the scoring record. After this big performance, Orok left Akwa United to sign with Tunisian Ligue Professionnelle 1 club CS Sfax on 13 July 2009. He signed for Al-Hidd FC of Bahrain in 2014, having scored 18 goals in 33 games
