= Khalid El Ebrahim =

Kuwaiti footballer (born 1992)

Personal information
- Full name: Khalid El Ebrahim
- Date of birth: 28 August 1992 (age 34)
- Place of birth: Kuwait City, Kuwait
- Position: Defender

Team information
- Current team: Al-Qadsia
- Number: 36

Youth career
- 2008–2012: Al-Qadsia

Senior career*
Years	Team	Apps	(Gls)
2012–	Al-Qadsia		

International career^{‡}
2014–	Kuwait	54	(3)
- * Club domestic league appearances and goals ‡ National team caps and goals as of 4 July 2023

Khalid El Ebrahim (born 28 August 1992) is a Kuwaiti professional footballer who plays for Al-Qadsia as a defender. He is the son of Kuwaiti football player and manager Mohammed Ebrahim Hajeyah, and his brother Ahmad El Ebrahim played for rivals Al-Arabi.

== International goals ==
Scores and results list Kuwait's goal tally first.

No.	Date	Venue	Opponent	Score	Result	Competition
-.	4 September 2014	Anshan Sports Centre Stadium, Anshan, China	China	1–1	1–3	Unofficial Friendly
-.	12 June 2023	Cairo International Stadium, Cairo, Egypt	Zambia B	2–0	3–0	Unofficial Friendly
1.	21 June 2023	Sree Kanteerava Stadium	Nepal	1–0	3–1	2023 SAFF Championship

== Honours ==
Kuwait

- SAFF Championship runner-up: 2023
