= Dhari Said =

Kuwaiti footballer

Personal information
- Full name: Dhari Said Abdullah
- Date of birth: 2 May 1987 (age 39)
- Place of birth: Kuwait
- Height: 1.73 m (5 ft 8 in)
- Position: Defender

Youth career
- –2008: Qadsia SC

Senior career*
| Years | Team | Apps | (Gls) |
| 2008–2024 | Qadsia SC | | |

International career^{‡}
| 2012–2019 | Kuwait | 18 | (0) |
- * Club domestic league appearances and goals ‡ National team caps and goals as of 19 November 2019

Dhari Said Abdullah (Arabic: ضاري سعيد مبروك عبد الله) is a retired Kuwaiti footballer who played as a defender.
