= Saif Al Hashan =

Kuwaiti footballer

Personal information
- Full name: Saif Ahmad Saif Al Hashan
- Date of birth: 29 January 1990 (age 36)
- Place of birth: Kuwait
- Height: 1.73 m (5 ft 8 in)
- Position: Midfielder

Senior career*
Years	Team	Apps	(Gls)
2011–2015	Qadsia SC	43	(18)
2015–2017	Al-Shabab	4	(1)
2017–2021	Qadsia SC	24	(8)
2021–2024	Al-Arabi	30	(5)
2024–2025	Al-Salmiya	6	(1)
2025–	Khaitan		

International career
2013–	Kuwait	7	(1)
- * Club domestic league appearances and goals

Saif Al Hashan is a Kuwaiti professional footballer. After winning the 2014 AFC Cup, he won the most valuable player of the tournament.

== Honors ==
Al-Qadisa

- Kuwaiti Premier League: 2011–12, 2013–14
- Kuwait Emir Cup: 2011–12, 2012–13, 2014–15
- Kuwait Crown Prince Cup: 2012–13, 2013–14, 2017–18
- Kuwait Super Cup: 2013, 2014, 2018, 2019
- AFC Cup: 2014
