= 2007 AFC Cup =

4th secondary club football tournament organized by the

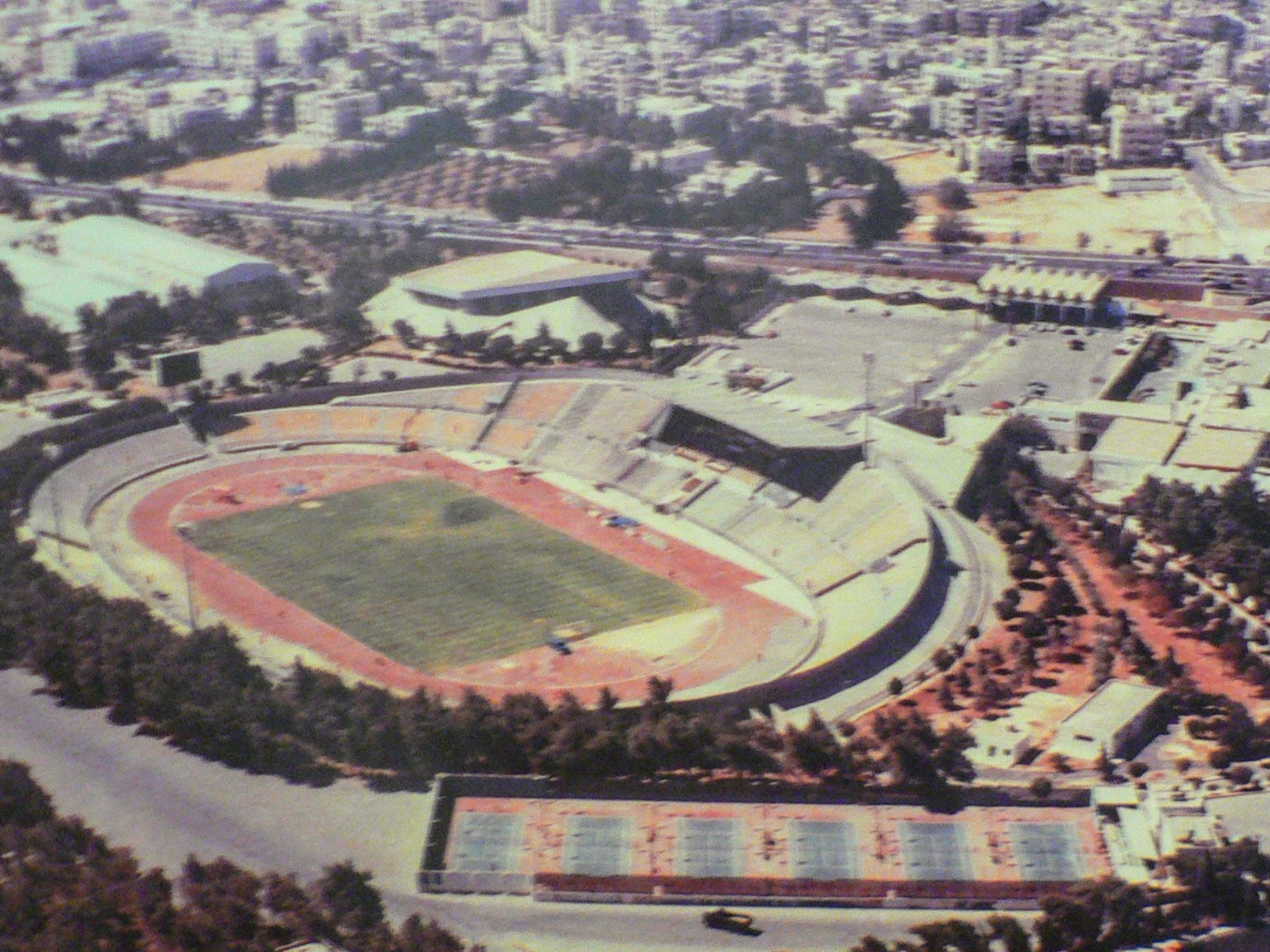
- The Amman International Stadium in Amman hosted both legs of the final.

Tournament details
- Dates: 6 March – 9 November 2007
- Teams: 24 (from 13 associations)

Final positions
- Champions: (Jordan) Shabab Al-Ordon (1st title)
- Runners-up: (Jordan) Al-Faisaly

Tournament statistics
- Matches played: 86
- Goals scored: 226 (2.63 per match)
- Top scorer(s): (Lebanon) Mohammed Ghaddar (Jordan) Odai Al-Saify (5 goals each)

The 2007 AFC Cup was the fourth edition of the AFC Cup, played amongst clubs from nations of the AFC, who are considered to be 'developing countries' as per the 'Vision Asia' members paper of AFC President Mohamed Bin Hammam.

Shabab Al-Ordon defeated two-time defending champions Al-Faisaly 2–1 on aggregate to claim their first AFC Cup title, and a third consecutive victory by a Jordanian team.

The competition was dominated by Jordanian teams, with three of the four semi-finalists coming from that nation: Shabab Al-Ordon, Al-Faisaly and Al-Wehdat.

== Qualification ==
The AFC invited the thirteen 'developing' nations to nominate one or two clubs to participate in the competition. As this was the first season in which clubs from Australia participated in Asian club competitions and were awarded two qualification places in the AFC Champions League, the following changes were made:

- The second ranked team from Thailand (Osotsapa) and Vietnam (Hoa Phat Hanoi) were reassigned from the AFC Champions League to the AFC Cup.
- Bangladesh were excluded from the competition, as its clubs would now participate in the AFC President's Cup.

As defending champions Al-Faisaly had already qualified for the competition due to their cup performance, Jordan was awarded an additional qualification berth.

Clubs from Myanmar and North Korea did not participate in the competition. This marked the first year in which clubs from Thailand and Vietnam participated in the competition.

The draw for the group stage took place in Kuala Lumpur on 22 December 2006, allocating teams into six groups of four.

West Asia			East Asia		
Team	Qualifying method	App (Last)	Team	Qualifying method	App (Last)
(Bahrain) Al-Muharraq	2005–06 Bahraini Premier League champions	2nd (2006)	(Hong Kong) Happy Valley	2005–06 Hong Kong First Division League champions	4th (2006)
(Jordan) Shabab Al-Ordon	2005–06 Jordan League champions	1st	(Hong Kong) Sun Hei	2006 Hong Kong FA Cup winners	3rd (2006)
(Jordan) Al-Faisaly^{TH}	2005–06 Jordan FA Cup winners	3rd (2006)	(India) Mahindra United	2005–06 Indian National Football League champions	2nd (2004)
(Jordan) Al-Wahdat	2005–06 Jordan League third place	1st	(India) Mohun Bagan	2006 Indian Federation Cup winners	1st
(Lebanon) Al Ahed	2005–06 Lebanese Premier League champions	1st	(Malaysia) Negeri Sembilan	2005–06 Super League Malaysia champions	2nd (2004)
(Lebanon) Nejmeh	2005–06 Lebanese Premier League runners-up	4th (2006)	(Malaysia) Pahang	2006 Malaysia FA Cup winners	2nd (2005)
(Oman) Muscat	2005–06 Omani League champions	1st	(Maldives) New Radiant	2006 Dhivehi League champion	3rd (2006)
(Oman) Dhofar	2006 Sultan Qaboos Cup winners	2nd (2004)	(Maldives) Victory SC	2006 Dhivehi League runners-up	1st
(Turkmenistan) HTTU Asgabat	2006 Ýokary Liga champions	2nd (2006)	Singapore Armed Forces	2006 S.League champions	1st
(Turkmenistan) Nebitçi	2006 Ýokary Liga runners-up	3rd (2005)	(Singapore) Tampines Rovers	2006 Singapore Cup winners	3rd (2006)
(Yemen) Al-Saqr	2006 Yemeni League champions	1st	(Thailand) Osotsapa	2006 Thailand Premier League runners-up	1st
(Yemen) Al-Hilal	2005 Yemeni President Cup winners	1st	(Vietnam) Hoa Phat Hanoi	2006 Vietnamese Cup winners	1st

=== Notes ===
1. Jordan (JOR): As the 2005–06 Jordan FA Cup winners Al-Faisaly qualified for the AFC Cup via as defending champions, the spot reserved for the Jordan FA Cup winners was transferred to the third placed team in the 2005–06 Jordan League.
2. Maldives (MDV): As the 2006 Maldives FA Cup winners New Radiant qualified for the AFC Cup via their league position, the spot reserved for the Maldives FA Cup winners was transferred to the second placed team in the 2006 Dhivehi League.
3. Turkmenistan (TKM): As the 2006 Turkmenistan Cup winners HTTU Aşgabat qualified for the AFC Cup via their league position, the spot reserved for the Turkmenistan Cup winners was transferred to the second placed team in the 2006 Ýokary Liga.

== Group stage ==
=== Group A ===
Pos	Team	Pld	W	D	L	GF	GA	GD	Pts	Qualification
1	(Lebanon) Nejmeh	6	5	0	1	8	5	+3	15	Advance to Knockout stage
2	(Jordan) Shabab Al-Ordon	6	4	1	1	8	3	+5	13	Advance to Knockout stage
3	(Oman) Muscat	6	1	1	4	4	6	−2	4	
4	(Yemen) Al-Saqr	6	0	2	4	5	11	−6	2	

6 March 2007

Shabab Al-Ordon (Jordan)	2–0	(Yemen) Al-Saqr
Mohammad 39'; Omaier 90+2'	(Report)

King Abdullah Stadium, Amman
Attendance: 300
Referee: Abdulrahman Abdou (Qatar)
6 March 2007

Nejmeh (Lebanon)	1–0	(Oman) Muscat
Atwi 18'	(Report)

Sports City, Beirut
Attendance: 500
Referee: Ali Al Mutlaq (Saudi Arabia)

20 March 2007

Al-Saqr (Yemen)	1–2	(Lebanon) Nejmeh
Al-Omqi 61'	(Report)	Hamieh 45+1'; Nasseredine 89'

Al Thawra Sports City, Sana'a
Attendance: 5,000
Referee: Abdulrahman Recho (Syria)
20 March 2007

Muscat (Oman)	0–1	(Jordan) Shabab Al-Ordon
	(Report)	Adi 50'

Sultan Qaboos Sports Complex, Muscat
Attendance: 109
Referee: Mohamed Al Saeedi (United Arab Emirates)

10 April 2007

Al-Saqr (Yemen)	2–2	(Oman) Muscat
Saeed 6'; Mousa 54'	(Report)	Al-Maawali 4'; Al-Fazari 69'

Al Thawra Sports City, Sana'a
Attendance: 6,000
Referee: Kadhum Auda Lazim (Iraq)
10 April 2007

Shabab Al-Ordon (Jordan)	2–0	(Lebanon) Nejmeh
Touk 18'; Al-Saify 19'	(Report)

King Abdullah Stadium, Amman
Attendance: 1,000
Referee: Hedayat Mombini (Iran)

24 April 2007

Nejmeh (Lebanon)	2–1	(Jordan) Shabab Al-Ordon
Mohamad 51'; Ramos 86'	(Report)	Saher Adi 77'

Sports City, Beirut
Attendance: 3,000
Referee: Dilovar Orzuev (Tajikistan)
24 April 2007

Muscat (Oman)	2–0	(Yemen) Al-Saqr
Al-Lawati 18'; Al-Maawali 89'	(Report)

Sultan Qaboos Sports Complex, Muscat
Attendance: 200
Referee: Rustam Saidov (Uzbekistan)

8 May 2007

Al-Saqr (Yemen)	1–1	(Jordan) Shabab Al-Ordon
Al-Mang 38'	(Report)	Al-Bzour 10'

Al Thawra Sports City, Sana'a
Attendance: 2,500
Referee: Huang Junjie (China)
8 May 2007

Muscat (Oman)	0–1	(Lebanon) Nejmeh
	(Report)	Ghaddar 74'

Sultan Qaboos Sports Complex, Muscat
Attendance: 150
Referee: Saad Al Fadhli (Kuwait)

22 May 2007

Shabab Al-Ordon (Jordan)	1–0	(Oman) Muscat
Al-Saify 73'	(Report)

King Abdullah Stadium, Amman
Attendance: 100
Referee: Chaiwat Kunsuta (Thailand)
22 May 2007

Nejmeh (Lebanon)	2–1	(Yemen) Al-Saqr
Atwi 13'; Ghaddar 76'	(Report)	Al-Aroomi 87'

Sports City, Beirut
Referee: Kadyrbek Chynybekov (Kyrgyzstan))

=== Group B ===
Pos	Team	Pld	W	D	L	GF	GA	GD	Pts	Qualification
1	(Jordan) Al-Wahdat	6	4	2	0	16	8	+8	14	Advance to Knockout stage
2	(Bahrain) Al-Muharraq	6	3	2	1	10	7	+3	11	
3	(Turkmenistan) HTTU Aşgabat	6	2	0	4	10	12	−2	6	
4	(Yemen) Al-Hilal	6	0	2	4	6	15	−9	2	

6 March 2007

Al-Hilal (Yemen)	3–3	(Jordan) Al-Wahdat
Al-Dhaheri 55', 69'; Al-Shehri 90+1'	(Report)	Al-Sabah 39'; Abdul-Haleem 49'; Shelbaieh 78'

Al Thawra Sports City, Sana'a
Attendance: 4,500
Referee: Rosdi Shaharul (Malaysia)
6 March 2007

Al-Muharraq (Bahrain)	3–1	(Turkmenistan) HTTU Aşgabat
da Silva 20'; Omar 45+1'; Alzain 57'	(Report)	Arazow 13'

Bahrain National Stadium, Manama
Attendance: 1,000
Referee: Abdulrahman Recho (Syria)

20 March 2007

HTTU Aşgabat (Turkmenistan)	3–1	(Yemen) Al-Hilal
Şamyradow 44'; Karadanov 63', 82'	(Report)	Al-Shehri 11'

Olympic Stadium, Ashgabat
Attendance: 300
Referee: Rustam Saidov (Uzbekistan)
20 March 2007

Al-Wahdat (Jordan)	1–1	(Bahrain) Al-Muharraq
Ragheb 66'	(Report)	Al-Dakeel 45'

King Abdullah Stadium, Amman
Attendance: 6,000
Referee: Mohamad Mansour (Lebanon)

10 April 2007

HTTU Aşgabat (Turkmenistan)	1–2	(Jordan) Al-Wahdat
Garadanow 76'	(Report)	Fattah 30'; Abdul-Haleem 66' (pen.)

Olympic Stadium, Ashgabat
Attendance: 1,000
Referee: Subrata Sarkar (India)
10 April 2007

Al-Muharraq (Bahrain)	2–1	(Yemen) Al-Hilal
Abdulrahman 5', 66'	(Report)	Salem 31'

Bahrain National Stadium, Manama
Attendance: 2,000
Referee: Abdul Malik Abdul Bashir (Singapore)

24 April 2007

Al-Hilal (Yemen)	1–1	(Bahrain) Al-Muharraq
Ghazi 52'	(Report)	da Silva 23'

Al Thawra Sports City, Sana'a
Attendance: 3,000
Referee: Mohsen Torky (Iran)
24 April 2007

Al-Wahdat (Jordan)	4–2	(Turkmenistan) HTTU Aşgabat
Ragheb 29'; Fattah 54', 68'; Shelbaieh 71'	(Report)	Şamyradow 23', 40'

King Abdullah Stadium, Amman
Attendance: 7,000
Referee: Abdulrahman Abdou (Qatar)

8 May 2007

Al-Wahdat (Jordan)	4–0	(Yemen) Al-Hilal
Fat'hi 17'; Deeb 67'; Ragheb 73'; Ali 85'	(Report)

King Abdullah Stadium, Amman
Attendance: 5,000
Referee: Mohamed Omar Al Saeedi (United Arab Emirates)
8 May 2007

HTTU Aşgabat (Turkmenistan)	1–2	(Bahrain) Al-Muharraq
Arazow 9'	(Report)	Al Dakeel 36'; Alzain 66'

Olympic Stadium, Ashgabat
Attendance: 200
Referee: Yang Zhiqiang (China)

22 May 2007

Al-Muharraq (Bahrain)	1–2	(Jordan) Al-Wahdat
Al-Dakeel 79'	(Report)	Shelbaieh 51'; Ragheb 72'

Bahrain National Stadium, Manama
Attendance: 2,000
Referee: Atallah Jatli Al-Enezi (Kuwait)
22 May 2007

Al-Hilal (Yemen)	0–2	(Turkmenistan) HTTU Aşgabat
	(Report)	Garadanow 3'; Baýramow 58'

Al Thawra Sports City, Sana'a
Attendance: 3,000
Referee: Ali Saleem (Maldives)

=== Group C ===
Pos	Team	Pld	W	D	L	GF	GA	GD	Pts	Qualification
1	(Jordan) Al-Faisaly	6	3	2	1	7	3	+4	11	Advance to Knockout stage
2	(Oman) Dhofar	6	3	1	2	4	5	−1	10	
3	(Lebanon) Al-Ansar	6	2	3	1	8	5	+3	9	
4	(Turkmenistan) Nebitçi Balkanabat	6	0	2	4	2	8	−6	2	

6 March 2007

Dhofar (Oman)	0–0	(Lebanon) Al-Ansar
	(Report)

Sultan Qaboos Sports Complex, Muscat
Attendance: 400
Referee: Jasim Karim (Bahrain)
6 March 2007

Nebitçi Balkanabat (Turkmenistan)	0–0	(Jordan) Al-Faisaly
	(Report)

Nisa Stadium, Ashgabat
Attendance: 100
Referee: Atallah Jatli Al-Enezi (Kuwait)

20 March 2007

Al-Ansar (Lebanon)	3–1	(Turkmenistan) Nebitçi Balkanabat
Ghoson 3'; Sadir 45'; Hamid Basma 71'	(Report)	Guljagazov 80'

Sports City, Beirut
Attendance: 2,500
Referee: Masoud Moradi (Iran)
20 March 2007

Al-Faisaly (Jordan)	2–1	(Oman) Dhofar
Al-Maharmeh 28'; Mohammad Shawish 58'	(Report)	Salah 53'

Amman International Stadium, Amman
Attendance: 2,000
Referee: Abdullah Balideh (Qatar)

10 April 2007

Al-Ansar (Lebanon)	0–2	(Jordan) Al-Faisaly
	(Report)	Salim 14'; Hijah 66'

Sports City, Beirut
Attendance: 3,500
Referee: Fareed Ali Mohammad Al-Marzouqi (United Arab Emirates)
10 April 2007

Dhofar (Oman)	1–0	(Turkmenistan) Nebitçi Balkanabat
Dine 39'	(Report)

Sultan Qaboos Sports Complex, Muscat
Attendance: 200
Referee: Satop Tongkhan (Thailand)

24 April 2007

Nebitçi Balkanabat (Turkmenistan)	0–1	(Oman) Dhofar
	(Report)	Al Noobi 81'

Olympic Stadium, Ashgabat
Attendance: 200
Referee: Subrata Sarkar (India)
24 April 2007

Al-Faisaly (Jordan)	1–1	(Lebanon) Al-Ansar
Al-Maharmeh 90'	(Report)	Ghoson 36'

Prince Mohammed Stadium, Zarqa
Attendance: 2,000
Referee: Ram Krishna Gosh (Bangladesh)

8 May 2007

Al-Ansar (Lebanon)	3–0	(Oman) Dhofar
Hassoun 10'; Ghoson 44'; Al Jamal 79'	(Report)

Sports City, Beirut
Attendance: 2,100
Referee: Kadhum Auda Lazim (Iraq)
8 May 2007

Al-Faisaly (Jordan)	2–0	(Turkmenistan) Nebitçi Balkanabat
Al-Shboul 48'; Hijah 88'	(Report)

Prince Mohammed Stadium, Zarqa
Attendance: 300
Referee: Ali Hamad Al-Badwawi (United Arab Emirates)

22 May 2007

Nebitçi Balkanabat (Turkmenistan)	1–1	(Lebanon) Al-Ansar
Begjanov 82'	(Report)	Abbas 50'

Olympic Stadium, Ashgabat
Attendance: 150
Referee: Rustam Saidov (Uzbekistan)
22 May 2007

Dhofar (Oman)	1–0	(Jordan) Al-Faisaly
Fahad 11'	(Report)

Sultan Qaboos Sports Complex, Muscat
Attendance: 400
Referee: Muhsen Basma (Syria)

=== Group D ===
Pos	Team	Pld	W	D	L	GF	GA	GD	Pts	Qualification
1	(Hong Kong) Sun Hei	6	5	0	1	15	6	+9	15	Advance to Knockout stage
2	(Malaysia) Negeri Sembilan	6	1	4	1	4	5	−1	7	
3	(Maldives) Victory SC	6	1	3	2	7	9	−2	6	
4	(Vietnam) Hoa Phat Hanoi	6	0	3	3	7	13	−6	3	

6 March 2007

Sun Hei (Hong Kong)	2–0	(Maldives) Victory SC
Inegbenoise 17'; Ezeh 49'	(Report)

Mong Kok Stadium, Hong Kong
Attendance: 369
Referee: Kazuhiko Matsumura (Japan)
6 March 2007

Negeri Sembilan (Malaysia)	0–0	(Vietnam) Hoa Phat Hanoi
	(Report)

Tuanku Abdul Rahman Stadium, Seremban
Attendance: 1,500
Referee: Mukhtar Al Yarimi (Yemen)

20 March 2007

Victory SC (Maldives)	2–2	(Malaysia) Negeri Sembilan
Ali 7'; Baree 22'	(Report)	Freddy 17', 90+4'

National Stadium, Malé
Attendance: 8,000
Referee: Subrata Sarkar (India)
20 March 2007

Hoa Phat Hanoi (Vietnam)	1–2	(Hong Kong) Sun Hei
Thanh 58'	(Report)	João Miguel 24'; Kwan 60'

Hàng Đẫy Stadium, Hanoi
Attendance: 1,500
Referee: Cho Win (Myanmar)

10 April 2007

Victory SC (Maldives)	2–2	(Vietnam) Hoa Phat Hanoi
Shiyam 73'; Nam 90' (o.g.)	(Report)	da Silva 14'; Santos 77'

National Stadium, Malé
Attendance: 6,000
Referee: Salem Mujghef (Jordan)
10 April 2007

Sun Hei (Hong Kong)	2–0	(Malaysia) Negeri Sembilan
Victor 6', 69'	(Report)

Mong Kok Stadium, Hong Kong
Attendance: 200
Referee: Atallah Jatli Al-Enezi (Kuwait)

24 April 2007

Negeri Sembilan (Malaysia)	1–0	(Hong Kong) Sun Hei
Freddy 88'	(Report)

Tuanku Abdul Rahman Stadium, Seremban
Attendance: 1,100
Referee: Ali Hamad Al-Badwawi (United Arab Emirates)
24 April 2007

Hoa Phat Hanoi (Vietnam)	0–2	(Maldives) Victory SC
	(Report)	Ashad Ali 37', 81'

Hàng Đẫy Stadium, Hanoi
Attendance: 500
Referee: Tan Hai (China)

8 May 2007

Hoa Phat Hanoi (Vietnam)	0–0	(Malaysia) Negeri Sembilan
	(Report)

Hàng Đẫy Stadium, Hanoi
Attendance: 3,000
Referee: Ram Krishna Gosh (Bangladesh)
9 May 2007 (Note: The match between Victory SC and Xiangxue Sun Hei was postponed to 9 May after the assistant referees from Indonesia were unable to arrive in the Maldives as their flight was delayed.)

Victory SC (Maldives)	0–2	(Hong Kong) Sun Hei
	(Report)	Colly Barnes Ezeh 14'; Lico 33'

National Stadium, Malé
Attendance: 4,000
Referee: Ben Williams (Australia)

22 May 2007

Negeri Sembilan (Malaysia)	1–1	(Maldives) Victory SC
Mohd 45'	(Report)	Shaffaz 22'

Tuanku Abdul Rahman Stadium, Seremban
Attendance: 600
Referee: Mohamad Mansour (Lebanon)
22 May 2007

Sun Hei (Hong Kong)	7–4	(Vietnam) Hoa Phat Hanoi
Lico 5', 61', 73'; Ezeh 15', 65'; Chu Siu Kei 25', 41'	(Report)	Cao Sy Cuong 10' (pen.); Nguyen Ngoc Tu 33'; Vu Hong Viet 54' (pen.); Nguyen Anh Cuong 75'

Mong Kok Stadium, Hong Kong
Attendance: 208
Referee: Satop Tongkhan (Thailand)

=== Group E ===
Pos	Team	Pld	W	D	L	GF	GA	GD	Pts	Qualification
1	Singapore Armed Forces	6	5	0	1	13	7	+6	15	Advance to Knockout stage
2	(India) Mahindra United	6	4	0	2	9	4	+5	12	Advance to Knockout stage
3	(Hong Kong) Happy Valley	6	3	0	3	9	11	−2	9	
4	(Maldives) New Radiant	6	0	0	6	4	13	−9	0	

6 March 2007

Singapore Armed Forces	0–2	(India) Mahindra United
	(Report)	Yakubu 36' (pen.); Pomeyie 83'

Choa Chu Kang Stadium, Singapore
Attendance: 2,288
Referee: Abdullah Balideh (Qatar)
6 March 2007

New Radiant (Maldives)	0–2	(Hong Kong) Happy Valley
	(Report)	Guy 12'; Poon Yiu Cheuk 81'

National Stadium, Malé
Attendance: 7,000
Referee: Kadyrbek Chynybekov (Kyrgyzstan)

20 March 2007

Mahindra United (India)	1–0	(Maldives) New Radiant
Yakubu 90+4'	(Report)

Pandit Jawahar Lal Nehru Stadium, Goa
Attendance: 3,000
Referee: Mahmood Mohd Juma Al Ghatrifi (Oman)
20 March 2007

Happy Valley (Hong Kong)	1–4	Singapore Armed Forces
Lee Sze Ming 22'	(Report)	Chaiman 7'; Ali 61'; Duric 79', 89'

Mong Kok Stadium, Hong Kong
Attendance: 391
Referee: Ram Krishna Gosh (Bangladesh)

10 April 2007

Mahindra United (India)	3–1	(Hong Kong) Happy Valley
Venkatesh 40'; Pomeyie 73', 77'	(Report)	Guy 54'

Pandit Jawahar Lal Nehru Stadium, Goa
Attendance: 2,000
Referee: Abdulrahman Recho (Syria)
10 April 2007

Singapore Armed Forces	3–1	(Maldives) New Radiant
Duric 10'; Shariff 68', 84'	(Report)	Kasirye 72'

Choa Chu Kang Stadium, Singapore
Attendance: 2,309
Referee: Kim Dong-Jin (South Korea)

24 April 2007

New Radiant (Maldives)	2–3	Singapore Armed Forces
Ibrahim 9'; Ashfaq 71'	(Report)	Manzur 33'; Arai 38'; Duric 65'

National Stadium, Malé
Attendance: 3,000
Referee: Cho Win (Myanmar)
24 April 2007

Happy Valley (Hong Kong)	2–1	(India) Mahindra United
Law Chun Bong 21', 23'	(Report)	Yusif Yakubu 68'

Mong Kok Stadium, Hong Kong
Attendance: 100
Referee: Rosdi Shaharul (Malaysia)

8 May 2007

Mahindra United (India)	0–1	Singapore Armed Forces
	(Report)	Chaiman 7'

Pandit Jawahar Lal Nehru Stadium, Goa
Attendance: 500
Referee: Salem Mujghef (Jordan)
8 May 2007

Happy Valley (Hong Kong)	2–1	(Maldives) New Radiant
Monteiro 19'; Guy 63'	(Report)	Gani 87' (pen.)

Mong Kok Stadium, Hong Kong
Attendance: 400
Referee: Mahmood Mohd Juma Al Ghatrifi (Oman)

22 May 2007

Singapore Armed Forces	2–1	(Hong Kong) Happy Valley
Shariff 62', 81'	(Report)	Monteiro 2'

Choa Chu Kang Stadium, Singapore
Attendance: 2,326
Referee: Mark Shield (Australia)
22 May 2007

New Radiant (Maldives)	0–2	(India) Mahindra United
	(Report)	Madambillath 16'; Dias 63'

National Stadium, Malé
Attendance: 2,500
Referee: Ala Abdul Kadir Nema (Iraq)

=== Group F ===
Pos	Team	Pld	W	D	L	GF	GA	GD	Pts	Qualification
1	(Singapore) Tampines Rovers	6	4	1	1	10	5	+5	13	Advance to Knockout stage
2	(India) Mohun Bagan	6	3	2	1	5	3	+2	11	
3	(Thailand) Osotsapa	6	3	1	2	12	3	+9	10	
4	(Malaysia) Pahang	6	0	0	6	2	18	−16	0	

6 March 2007

Osotsapa (Thailand)	4–0	(Malaysia) Pahang
Jaihan 15'; Khookaew 54'; Kemden 70'; Puanakunmee 78'	(Report)

Royal Thai Army Stadium, Bangkok
Attendance: 150
Referee: Mohsen Torky (Iran)
6 March 2007

Mohun Bagan (India)	0–0	(Singapore) Tampines Rovers
	(Report)

Salt Lake Stadium, Kolkata
Attendance: 20,000
Referee: Vo Minh Tri (Vietnam)

20 March 2007

Pahang (Malaysia)	1–2	(India) Mohun Bagan
El Janaby 61'	(Report)	Pachuau 30'; Bhutia 74'

Darulmakmur Stadium, Kuantan
Attendance: 1,000
Referee: Kadhum Auda Lazim (Iraq)
20 March 2007

Tampines Rovers (Singapore)	2–1	(Thailand) Osotsapa
de Oliveira 25'; Shah 79'	(Report)	Wangsawat 76'

Tampines Stadium, Singapore
Attendance: 2,668
Referee: Fareed Ali Mohamed Al Marzouqi (United Arab Emirates)

10 April 2007

Pahang (Malaysia)	1–4	(Singapore) Tampines Rovers
Rodiarjat 80'	(Report)	Ali 2'; Muhammad 45+1'; Shafaein 65'; Suksomkit 78'

MPPJ Stadium, Petaling Jaya
Attendance: 100
Referee: Ben Williams (Australia)
10 April 2007

Osotsapa (Thailand)	0–0	(India) Mohun Bagan
	(Report)

Royal Thai Army Stadium, Bangkok
Attendance: 2000
Referee: Yang Zhiqiang (China)

24 April 2007

Mohun Bagan (India)	1–0	(Thailand) Osotsapa
Barreto 43'	(Report)

Salt Lake Stadium, Kolkata
Attendance: 18,000
Referee: Kwon Jong-Chul (South Korea)
24 April 2007

Tampines Rovers (Singapore)	2–0	(Malaysia) Pahang
Muhammad 32'; Grabovac 70'	(Report)

Tampines Stadium, Singapore
Attendance: 2,942
Referee: Mukhtar Al Yarimi (Yemen)

8 May 2007

Pahang (Malaysia)	0–4	(Thailand) Osotsapa
	(Report)	Purisai 29'; Jaihan 38' (pen.), 51'; Suntornpanavej 77'

Shah Alam Stadium, Shah Alam
Attendance: 100
Referee: Abdulrahman Abdou (Qatar)
8 May 2007

Tampines Rovers (Singapore)	2–0	(India) Mohun Bagan
Shah 34', 66'	(Report)

Tampines Stadium, Singapore
Attendance: 2,500
Referee: Abdulhameed Ebrahim (Bahrain)

22 May 2007

Osotsapa (Thailand)	3–0	(Singapore) Tampines Rovers
Suntornpanavej 64', 82', 90+2'	(Report)

Royal Thai Army Stadium, Bangkok
Attendance: 200
Referee: Hiroyoshi Takayama (Japan)
22 May 2007

Mohun Bagan (India)	2–0	(Malaysia) Pahang
Bhowmick 12'; Pachuau 69'	(Report)

Salt Lake Stadium, Kolkata
Attendance: 15,000
Referee: Dilovar Orzuev (Tajikistan)

=== Ranking of second-placed teams ===
==== West & Central Asia ====
Pos	Team	Pld	W	D	L	GF	GA	GD	Pts	Qualification
1	(Jordan) Shabab Al-Ordon	6	4	1	1	8	3	+5	13	Advance to Knockout stage
2	(Bahrain) Al-Muharraq	6	3	2	1	10	7	+3	11	
3	(Oman) Dhofar	6	3	1	2	4	5	−1	10	

==== East, South & South East Asia ====
Pos	Team	Pld	W	D	L	GF	GA	GD	Pts	Qualification
1	(India) Mahindra United	6	4	0	2	9	4	+5	12	Advance to Knockout stage
2	(India) Mohun Bagan	6	3	2	1	5	3	+2	11	
3	(Malaysia) Negeri Sembilan	6	1	4	1	4	5	−1	7	

== Knockout stage ==
=== Quarter-finals ===
Team 1	Agg.	Team 2	1st leg	2nd leg
Mahindra United (India)	4–5	(Lebanon) Nejmeh	1–2	3–3
Tampines Rovers (Singapore)	3–7	(Jordan) Al-Faisaly	1–2	2–5
Sun Hei (Hong Kong)	1–4	(Jordan) Al-Wahdat	0–1	1–3
Shabab Al-Ordon (Jordan)	5–3	Singapore Armed Forces	5–0	0–3

==== Matches ====
18 September 2007

Mahindra United (India)	1–2	(Lebanon) Nejmeh
Rafi 47'	(Report)	M. Ghaddar 55', 85'

Pandit Jawahar Lal Nehru Stadium, Goa
Attendance: 1,500
Referee: Ali A. A. Al Mutlaq (Saudi Arabia)
25 September 2007

Nejmeh (Lebanon)	3–3	(India) Mahindra United
M. Ghaddar 12'; A. Milas 24'; Bogunovic 90+4' (pen.)	(Report)	Minga 33'; Harpreet 64'; Pomeyie 78'

Sports City, Beirut
Attendance: 2,000
Referee: Mohamed Omar Al Saeedi (United Arab Emirates)

Nejmeh won 5–4 on aggregate.

18 September 2007

Tampines Rovers (Singapore)	1–2	(Jordan) Al-Faisaly
Sead 41' (pen.)	(Report)	Abu Keshek 45+2'; Al-Tall 74'

Tampines Stadium, Singapore
Attendance: 2,654
Referee: Hiroyoshi Takayama (Japan)
25 September 2007

Al-Faisaly (Jordan)	5–2	Tampines Rovers
Al-Shboul 35'; Abu Keshek 42'; Al-Tall 44', 66'; Abu Alieh 69'	(Report)	Suksomkit 1'; Peres 14'

Prince Mohammed Stadium, Zarqa
Attendance: 3,000
Referee: Tayeb Hasan Shamsuzzaman (Bangladesh)

Al-Faisaly won 7–3 on aggregate.

18 September 2007

Sun Hei (Hong Kong)	0–1	(Jordan) Al-Wahdat
	(Report)	Abdul-Haleem 83'

Mong Kok Stadium, Hong Kong
Attendance: 1,200
Referee: Yuichi Nishimura (Japan)
25 September 2007

Al-Wahdat (Jordan)	3–1	(Hong Kong) Sun Hei
Shelbaieh 58'; Deeb 71', 78'	(Report)	Giovane 87'

King Abdullah Stadium, Amman
Attendance: 9,000
Referee: Mohamad Mansour (Lebanon)

Al-Wahdat won 4–1 on aggregate.

18 September 2007

Shabab Al-Ordon (Jordan)	5–0	Singapore Armed Forces
Al-Khatib 19'; Abu Touk 52' (pen.); Al-Saify 60'; Shehdeh 83'; Abu Hash'hash 86'	(Report)

King Abdullah Stadium, Amman
Attendance: 1,000
Referee: Mohamed Omar Al Saeedi (United Arab Emirates)
25 September 2007

Singapore Armed Forces	3–0	(Jordan) Shabab Al-Ordon
Mustaqim 35'; Noor Ali 54'; Jamil Ali 75'	(Report)

Choa Chu Kang Stadium, Singapore
Attendance: 1,528
Referee: Yang Zhiqiang (China)

Shabab Al-Ordon won 5–3 on aggregate.

=== Semi-finals ===
Team 1	Agg.	Team 2	1st leg	2nd leg
Al-Faisaly (Jordan)	3–2	(Jordan) Al-Wahdat	1–1	2–1
Shabab Al-Ordon (Jordan)	1–0	(Lebanon) Nejmeh	1–0	0–0

==== Matches ====
3 October 2007

Al-Faisaly (Jordan)	1–1	(Jordan) Al-Wahdat
Al-Tall 43'	(Report)	Shelbaieh 71'

Amman International Stadium, Amman
Attendance: 15,000
Referee: Ravshan Irmatov (Uzbekistan)
22 October 2007

Al-Wahdat (Jordan)	1–2	(Jordan) Al-Faisaly
Ali 71' (pen.)	(Report)	Abu Keshek 32'; Al-Sheikh 60'

Amman International Stadium, Amman
Attendance: 17,000
Referee: Kwon Jong-Chul (South Korea)

Al-Faisaly won 3–2 on aggregate.

2 October 2007

Shabab Al-Ordon (Jordan)	1–0	(Lebanon) Nejmeh
Al-Saify 8'	(Report)

Amman International Stadium, Amman
Attendance: 1,500
Referee: Sun Baojie (China)
23 October 2007

Nejmeh (Lebanon)	0–0	(Jordan) Shabab Al-Ordon
	(Report)

Sports City, Beirut
Attendance: 1,000
Referee: Mohsen Torky (Iran)

Shabab Al-Ordon won 1–0 on aggregate.

=== Final ===
Team 1	Agg.	Team 2	1st leg	2nd leg
Shabab Al-Ordon (Jordan)	2–1	(Jordan) Al-Faisaly	1–0	1–1

==== Matches ====
2 November 2007

Al-Faisaly (Jordan)	0–1	(Jordan) Shabab Al-Ordon
	(Report)	Al-Saify 52'

Amman International Stadium, Amman
Attendance: 5,500
Referee: Yuichi Nishimura (Japan)
9 November 2007

Shabab Al-Ordon (Jordan)	1–1	(Jordan) Al-Faisaly
Shehdeh 44'	(Report)	Al-Shboul 13'

Amman International Stadium, Amman
Attendance: 7,500
Referee: Lee Gi-Young (South Korea)

Shabab Al-Ordon won 2–1 on aggregate.

2007 AFC Cup Winners
Shabab Al-Ordon
First title

== Statistics ==
=== Top goalscorers ===
Rank	Player	Team	Total
1	(Jordan) Odai Al-Saify	(Jordan) Shabab Al-Ordon	5
1	(Lebanon) Mohammed Ghaddar	(Lebanon) Nejmeh SC	5
3	(Singapore) Aleksandar Duric	Singapore Armed Forces	4
3	(Thailand) Apipu Suntornpanavej	(Thailand) Osotsapa	4
3	(Singapore) Ashrin Shariff	Singapore Armed Forces	4
3	(Jordan) Awad Ragheb	(Jordan) Al-Wahdat	4
3	(Hong Kong) Colly Barnes Ezeh	(Hong Kong) Sun Hei	4
3	(Turkmenistan) Mamedaly Karadanov	(Turkmenistan) HTTU Aşgabat	4
3	(Brazil) Lico	(Hong Kong) Sun Hei	4
9	(Bahrain) Abdulla Al Dakeel	(Bahrain) Al-Muharraq	3
9	(Maldives) Ashad Ali	(Maldives) Victory SC	3
9	(Lebanon) Fadi Ghoson	(Lebanon) Al-Ansar	3
9	(Angola) Freddy	(Malaysia) Negeri Sembilan	3
9	(Hong Kong) Gerard Ambassa Guy	(Hong Kong) Happy Valley	3
9	(Jordan) Mahmoud Shelbaieh	(Jordan) Al-Wahdat	3
9	(Singapore) Mohd Noh Alam Shah	(Singapore) Tampines Rovers	3
9	(Nigeria) Victor	(Hong Kong) Sun Hei	3
9	(Ghana) Yusif Yakubu	(India) Mahindra United	3

== See also ==
- 2007 AFC Champions League
- 2007 AFC President's Cup
