= 2006 AFC Cup =

3rd secondary club football tournament organized by the

Tournament details
- Dates: 7 March – 3 November 2006
- Teams: 20 (from 10 associations)

Final positions
- Champions: (Jordan) Al-Faisaly (2nd title)
- Runners-up: (Bahrain) Al-Muharraq

Tournament statistics
- Matches played: 58
- Goals scored: 195 (3.36 per match)
- Top scorer: (Jordan) Mahmoud Shelbaieh (8 goals)

The 2006 AFC Cup was the third edition of the AFC Cup, played amongst clubs from nations of the AFC, who are considered to be 'developing countries' as per the 'Vision Asia' members paper of AFC President Mohamed Bin Hammam.

Al-Faisaly successfully defended their title, beating Al-Muharraq 5–4 on aggregate in the final. With this victory Al-Faisaly became the first side to win the competition two years in a row.

== Qualification ==
The AFC invited the fourteen 'developing' nations to nominate one or two clubs to participate in the competition. Clubs from Myanmar and North Korea did not participate in the competition. This marked the first year in which clubs from Bahrain participated in the competition, as Bahrain was demoted to a 'developing' status by the AFC.

West Asia			East Asia		
Team	Qualifying method	App (Last)	Team	Qualifying method	App (Last)
(Bahrain) Al-Muharraq	2005 Bahraini King's Cup winners	1st	(Hong Kong) Xiangxue Sun Hei	2004–05 Hong Kong First Division League champions	2nd (2005)
(Bangladesh) Mohammedan	2005–06 Bangladesh National Football League champions	1st	(Hong Kong) Happy Valley	2005 Hong Kong FA Cup winners	3rd (2005)
(Bangladesh) Brothers Union	2005 Bangladesh Federation Cup winners	2nd (2005)	(Malaysia) Perlis	2005 Malaysia Super League champions	1st
(India) Dempo	2004–05 National Football League champions	2nd (2005)	(Malaysia) Selangor	2005 Malaysia FA Cup winners	1st
(India) East Bengal	2005 Federation Cup winners	1st	(Maldives) Hurriyya	2005 Dhivehi League champions	1st
(Jordan) Al-Wehdat	2004–05 Jordan League champions	1st	(Maldives) New Radiant	2005 Dhivehi League runners-up	2nd (2005)
(Jordan) Al-Faisaly^{TH}	2004–05 Jordan FA Cup winners	2nd (2005)	(Singapore) Tampines Rovers	2005 S.League champions	2nd (2005)
(Lebanon) Nejmeh	2004–05 Lebanese Premier League champions	3rd (2005)	(Singapore) Home United	2005 Singapore Cup winners	3rd (2005)
(Lebanon) Al Ahed	2005 Lebanese FA Cup winners	2nd (2005)			
(Oman) ~~Dhofar~~	2004–05 Omani League champions	2nd (2004)			
(Oman) Al-Nasr	2005 Sultan Qaboos Cup winners	1st			
(Turkmenistan) HTTU Asgabat	2005 Ýokary Liga champions	1st			
(Turkmenistan) Merv Mary	2005 Turkmenistan Cup winners	1st			
(Yemen) ~~Al Hilal~~	2005 Yemeni President Cup winners	1st			

=== Notes ===
1. Disqualified (DSQ): Dhofar and Al Hilal were disqualified from the competition by the AFC for failing to submit their player registration forms in time.
2. Maldives (MDV): As the 2005 Maldives FA Cup winners Hurriyya qualified for the AFC Cup via their league position, the spot reserved for the Maldives FA Cup winners was transferred to the second placed team in the 2005 Dhivehi League.

== Group stage ==
- Matchday dates are: 7 and 21 March, 11 and 25 April, 5 and 16 May 2006

=== Group A ===
Pos	Team	Pld	W	D	L	GF	GA	GD	Pts	Qualification
1	(Bahrain) Al-Muharraq	6	3	2	1	8	5	+3	11	Advance to Knockout stage
2	(Lebanon) Al Ahed	6	3	1	2	16	11	+5	10	
3	(India) Mahindra United	6	2	3	1	8	7	+1	9	
4	(Bangladesh) Brothers Union	6	0	2	4	5	14	−9	2	

Matches:

7 March 2006

Al-Muharraq (Bahrain)	2–0	(Bangladesh) Brothers Union
da Silva 45'; Yaseen 50'

Bahrain National Stadium, Riffa
8 March 2006

Al Ahed (Lebanon)	2–2	(India) Mahindra United
Bah 8'; Trad 29'		Dias 33'; Adjei 39'

Beirut Municipal Stadium, Beirut

21 March 2006

Brothers Union (Bangladesh)	2–2	(India) Mahindra United
Ameli 52'; Abul 63'		Yakubu 59'; Barreto 72'

Bangabandhu Stadium, Dhaka
21 March 2006

Al Ahed (Lebanon)	0–2	(Bahrain) Al-Muharraq
		Abdul Razzaq 45'; Al-Muqla 90'

Beirut Municipal Stadium, Beirut

11 April 2006

Al-Muharraq (Bahrain)	1–1	(India) Mahindra United
da Silva 61'		Sushant 64'

Bahrain National Stadium, Riffa
18 April 2006

Brothers Union (Bangladesh)	1–3	(Lebanon) Al Ahed
Tapu 40'		Marmar 5'; Ali 50'; Abbas 76'

Bangabandhu Stadium, Dhaka

25 April 2006

Mahindra United (India)	0–1	(Bahrain) Al-Muharraq
		Al-Dakeel 9'

25 April 2006

Al Ahed (Lebanon)	6–2	(Bangladesh) Brothers Union
Haidar 13', 20', 36'; Ayoub 22'; Yakooub 73'; Maatouk 83'		Ameli 69'; Tapu 87'

Beirut Municipal Stadium, Beirut

2 May 2006

Brothers Union (Bangladesh)	0–0	(Bahrain) Al-Muharraq

Bangabandhu Stadium, Dhaka
2 May 2006

Mahindra United (India)	2–1	(Lebanon) Al Ahed
Bose 78'; Adjei 79'		El Ali 51'

16 May 2006

Al-Muharraq (Bahrain)	2–4	(Lebanon) Al Ahed
Al Dakheel 45', 89'		Nasrallah 15'; Ayub 59'; Maatouk 76', 86'

Bahrain National Stadium, Riffa
16 May 2006

Mahindra United (India)	1–0	(Bangladesh) Brothers Union
Venkatesh 90'

=== Group B ===
Pos	Team	Pld	W	D	L	GF	GA	GD	Pts	Qualification
1	(Oman) Al-Nasr	4	4	0	0	10	2	+8	12	Advance to Knockout stage
2	(India) Dempo SC	4	1	1	2	9	7	+2	4	
3	(Turkmenistan) Merv Mary	4	0	1	3	4	14	−10	1	

Matches:

7 March 2006

Al-Nasr (Oman)	3–1	(India) Dempo SC
Matoona 57', 79'; Dias 86' (o.g.)		Martins 73'

Oman

21 March 2006

Merv Mary (Turkmenistan)	2–2	(India) Dempo SC
Yuzbashyan 80' (pen.), 90'		Martins 13'; Begendjev 87' (o.g.)

Turkmenistan

11 April 2006

Al-Nasr (Oman)	4–1	(Turkmenistan) Merv Mary
Al-Hinai 11', 48'; Al-Kahali 39'; Hoobees (?)

Oman

25 April 2006

Merv Mary (Turkmenistan)	0–2	(Oman) Al-Nasr
		Al-Hinai 11'; Tabook 38'

Turkmenistan

2 May 2006

Dempo SC (India)	0–1	(Oman) Al-Nasr
		Ashoor 55'

India

16 May 2006

Dempo SC (India)	6–1	(Turkmenistan) Merv Mary
João Cruz 20'; Naik 24'; Miranda 42', 78'; Beto 68', 85'		? (?)

India

=== Group C ===
Pos	Team	Pld	W	D	L	GF	GA	GD	Pts	Qualification
1	(Jordan) Al-Wahdat	2	2	0	0	9	1	+8	6	Advance to Knockout stage
2	(Bangladesh) Mohammedan	2	0	0	2	1	9	−8	0	

Matches:

11 April 2006

Al-Wahdat (Jordan)	7–0	(Bangladesh) Mohammedan
Shelbaieh 3', 53', 55'; Ali 47', 72'; Fattah 54', 70'

Jordan

25 April 2006

Mohammedan (Bangladesh)	1–2	(Jordan) Al-Wahdat
Nwachukwu 84' (pen.)	Report	Shelbaieh 60', 63'

Bangladesh

=== Group D ===
Pos	Team	Pld	W	D	L	GF	GA	GD	Pts	Qualification
1	(Jordan) Al-Faisaly	4	2	1	1	8	6	+2	7	Advance to Knockout stage
2	(Lebanon) Nejmeh	4	2	1	1	10	7	+3	7	Advance to Knockout stage
3	(Turkmenistan) HTTU	4	0	2	2	8	13	−5	2	

Matches:

7 March 2006

Nejmeh (Lebanon)	6–2	(Turkmenistan) HTTU
Nasseredine 25', 55', 57'; Antar 28'; Hojeij 34'; Ghaddar 72'		Bayramov 76'; Şamyradow 79'

Lebanon
21 March 2006

Al-Faisaly (Jordan)	2–0	(Lebanon) Nejmeh
Saad 13'; Agbo 44'

Jordan
11 April 2006

HTTU (Turkmenistan)	1–1	(Jordan) Al-Faisaly
Hojageldyýew 33'		Al-Shboul 30'

Turkmenistan
25 April 2006

Al-Faisaly (Jordan)	4–3	(Turkmenistan) HTTU
Al-Maharmeh 16', 18'; Al-Sheikh 79'; Saad 90'		Şamyradow 43', 65'; Guvanch 55'

Jordan
2 May 2006

HTTU (Turkmenistan)	2–2	(Lebanon) Nejmeh
Şamyradow 4 Belyh 58'		Ghaddar 74', 90'

Turkmenistan
16 May 2006

Al Nejmeh (Lebanon)	2–1	(Jordan) Al-Faisaly
Duah 23'; Nasseredine 70'		Saad 57'

Lebanon

=== Group E ===
Pos	Team	Pld	W	D	L	GF	GA	GD	Pts	Qualification
1	(Hong Kong) Xiangxue Sun Hei	6	4	1	1	11	4	+7	13	Advance to Knockout stage
2	(Malaysia) Perlis FA	6	3	2	1	11	4	+7	11	
3	(Singapore) Home United	6	2	0	4	8	11	−3	6	
4	(Maldives) New Radiant	6	1	1	4	7	18	−11	4	

Matches:

7 March 2006

New Radiant (Maldives)	0–2	(Hong Kong) Xiangxue Sun Hei
		Akosah 19', 28'

Maldives
7 March 2006

Home United (Singapore)	2–3	(Malaysia) Perlis FA
Goncalves 7', 62'		Chepita 52', 57', 89'

Singapore

21 March 2006

Xiangxue Sun Hei (Hong Kong)	0–1	(Singapore) Home United
		Daud 60'

Mong Kok Stadium, Hong Kong
21 March 2006

Perlis FA (Malaysia)	6–0	(Maldives) New Radiant
Wahid 45'; Chepita 48', 71', 76'; Simukonda 54', 65'

Malaysia

11 April 2006

Xiangxue Sun Hei (Hong Kong)	0–0	(Malaysia) Perlis FA

Mong Kok Stadium, Hong Kong
11 April 2006

New Radiant (Maldives)	5–3	(Singapore) Home United
Umar 22'; Ashfaq 66'; Thoriq 69' (?); Nitta 90'		Sulaiman 4'; Daud 77'; Goncalves 83'

Maldives

25 April 2006

Home United (Singapore)	2–0	(Maldives) New Radiant
Daud 21'; Goncalves 60'

Singapore
25 April 2006

Perlis FA (Malaysia)	1–2	(Hong Kong) Xiangxue Sun Hei
Simukonda 69'		Freitas 13'; Chiu Siu-ki 15'

Malaysia

2 May 2006

Perlis FA (Malaysia)	1–0	(Singapore) Home United
Chipeta 74'

Malaysia
3 May 2006

Xiangxue Sun Hei (Hong Kong)	5–2	(Maldives) New Radiant
Lai Kai-cheuk 4'; Freitas 31'; Akosah 49', 59', 62'		Nita 2' (pen.), 56'

Mong Kok Stadium, Hong Kong

16 May 2006

New Radiant (Maldives)	0–0	(Malaysia) Perlis FA

Maldives
16 May 2006

Home United (Singapore)	0–2	(Hong Kong) Xiangxue Sun Hei
		Freitas 22' (pen.); Akosah 57'

Singapore

=== Group F ===
Pos	Team	Pld	W	D	L	GF	GA	GD	Pts	Qualification
1	(Singapore) Tampines Rovers	6	5	0	1	17	5	+12	15	Advance to Knockout stage
2	(Malaysia) Selangor	6	5	0	1	14	9	+5	15	Advance to Knockout stage
3	(Hong Kong) Happy Valley	6	1	1	4	10	15	−5	4	
4	(Maldives) Hurriyya	6	0	1	5	3	15	−12	1	

Matches:

7 March 2006

Selangor (Malaysia)	1–0	(Singapore) Tampines Rovers
Fuentes 11'	(Report)

Bukit Jalil National Stadium, Kuala Lumpur
Attendance: 3,000
Referee: Tan Hai (China PR)
7 March 2006

Happy Valley (Hong Kong)	3–0	(Maldives) Hurriyya
Sham Kwok Keung 32'; Ambassa 37'; Lee Sze Ming 76'	(Report)

Mong Kok Stadium, Hong Kong
Attendance: 500
Referee: Chandrasiri Arambakade Gedara (Sri Lanka)

21 March 2006

Hurriyya (Maldives)	1–3	(Malaysia) Selangor
	(Report)	Fuentes 29' (pen.); Yahyah 63'; Pamungkas 66'

National Stadium, Malé
Attendance: 5,000
Referee: Subrata Sarkar (India)
21 March 2006

Tampines Rovers (Singapore)	3–1	(Hong Kong) Happy Valley
Shafaein 45'; Shah 48', 70'	(Report)	Alcântara 30'

Tampines Stadium, Singapore
Attendance: 3,021
Referee: Ben Williams (Australia)

11 April 2006

Tampines Rovers (Singapore)	3–1	(Maldives) Hurriyya
Grabovac 44'; Shafaein 49'; De Oliveira 89'	(Report)	Hilmy 90'

Tampines Stadium, Singapore
Attendance: 2,500
Referee: Yuichi Nishimura (Japan)
11 April 2006

Selangor (Malaysia)	4–3	(Hong Kong) Happy Valley
Adan 42'; Surendran 52'; Fuentes 64', 72'	(Report)	Evanor 14'; Alcântara 71' (pen.); Lee Wai Man 74'

Bukit Jalil National Stadium, Kuala Lumpur
Attendance: 1,000
Referee: Kwon Jong-Chul (South Korea)

25 April 2006

Happy Valley (Hong Kong)	2–3	(Malaysia) Selangor
Joao Evanor Fantin 19'; Gerard Guy Ambassa 74'	(Report)	Roslan 29'; Fuestes 71'; Sanbagamaran 88'

Mong Kok Stadium, Hong Kong
Attendance: 407
Referee: Sgt. Win Cho (Myanmar)
25 April 2006

Hurriyya (Maldives)	0–4	(Singapore) Tampines Rovers
	(Report)	Mohamed Rafi Ali 15', 24'; Aliff Shafaein 51'; Noh Alam Shah 81'

National Stadium, Malé
Attendance: 1,000
Referee: Ram Krishna Gosh (Bangladesh)

2 May 2006

Tampines Rovers (Singapore)	3–2	(Malaysia) Selangor
Peres De Oliveira 32'	(Report)	Bambang Pamungkas 56'

Tampines Stadium, Singapore
Attendance: 3,868
Referee: Yuichi Nishimura (Japan)
2 May 2006

Hurriyya (Maldives)	1–1	(Hong Kong) Happy Valley
Shinaz Hilmy 36'	(Report)	Li Chun Yip 21'

National Stadium, Malé
Attendance: 400
Referee: Subrata Sarkar (India)

16 May 2006

Selangor (Malaysia)	1–0	(Maldives) Hurriyya
K. Sanbagamaran 27'	(Report)

KLFA Stadium, Kuala Lumpur
Attendance: 3,000
Referee: Sgt. Win Cho (Myanmar)
16 May 2006

Happy Valley (Hong Kong)	0–4	(Singapore) Tampines Rovers
	(Report)	Noh Alam Shah 57'

Mong Kok Stadium, Hong Kong
Attendance: 66
Referee: Satop Tongkhan (Thailand)

=== Best runners-up ===
As Groups B–D only had either two or three teams, matches against any fourth-placed team in each group were not included in this ranking.

Pos	Team	Pld	W	D	L	GF	GA	GD	Pts	Qualification
1	(Malaysia) Selangor	4	3	0	1	10	8	+2	9	Advance to Knockout stage
2	(Lebanon) Nejmeh	4	2	1	1	10	7	+3	7	Advance to Knockout stage
3	(Malaysia) Perlis FA	4	2	1	1	5	4	+1	7	
4	(Lebanon) Al Ahed	4	2	0	2	9	7	+2	6	
5	(India) Dempo SC	4	1	1	2	9	7	+2	4	

== Knockout stage ==
=== Bracket ===
Quarterfinals
(Singapore) Tampines Rovers	0	0	0
(Jordan) Al-Wahdat	1	4	5
(Jordan) Al-Faisaly (p)	1	1	2 (5)
(Hong Kong) Sun Hei	1	1	2 (4)
(Malaysia) Selangor	0	0	0
(Lebanon) Nejmeh	1	0	1
(Oman) Al-Nasr	2	1	3
(Bahrain) Al-Muharraq (a)	3	0	3

Semifinals
(Jordan) Al-Wahdat	0	1	1
(Jordan) Al-Faisaly	1	1	2
(Lebanon) Nejmeh	1	2	3
(Bahrain) Al-Muharraq	2	4	6

Final
(Jordan) Al-Faisaly	3	2	5
(Bahrain) Al-Muharraq	0	4	4

=== Quarter-finals ===
==== Summary ====
Team 1	Agg.	Team 2	1st leg	2nd leg
Tampines Rovers (Singapore)	0–5	(Jordan) Al-Wahdat	0–1	0–4
Selangor (Malaysia)	0–1	(Lebanon) Nejmeh	0–1	0–0
Al-Nasr (Oman)	3–3 (a)	(Bahrain) Al-Muharraq	2–3	1–0
Al-Faisaly (Jordan)	2–2 (5–4 p)	(Hong Kong) Xiangxue Sun Hei	1–1	1–1 (a.e.t.)

Matches

12 September 2006

Tampines Rovers (Singapore)	0–1	(Jordan) Al-Wahdat
	(Report)	Ahmed Abdul-Haleem 49'

Tampines Stadium, Singapore
Attendance: 3,000
Referee: Tan Hai (China PR)
19 September 2006

Al-Wahdat (Jordan)	4–0	Tampines Rovers (Singapore)
Abdul-Haleem 14'; Shelbaieh 45+1', 47'; Hammad 69'	(Report)

Amman International Stadium, Amman
Attendance: 5,000
Referee: Kwon Jong-Chul (South Korea)

Al-Wahdat won 5–0 on aggregate.

12 September 2006

Selangor (Malaysia)	0–1	(Lebanon) Nejmeh
	(Report)	Ali Mohamed 24'

Shah Alam Stadium, Selangor
Attendance: 4,500
Referee: Subrata Sarkar (India)
19 September 2006

Nejmeh (Lebanon)	0–0	(Malaysia) Selangor
	(Report)

Beirut Sports City Stadium, Beirut
Attendance: 3,500
Referee: O M Al Saeedi

Nejmeh won 1–0 on aggregate.

12 September 2006

Al-Nasr (Oman)	2–3	(Bahrain) Al-Muharraq
Adil Matar 22'; Ashoor 55'	(Report)	Leandson Dias da Silva 13', 64'; Richard Massolin 58'

Al-Saada Stadium, Salalah
Attendance: 1,000
Referee: Qasem Shaban (Kuwait)
19 September 2006

Al-Muharraq (Bahrain)	0–1	(Oman) Al-Nasr
	(Report)	Matar 56' (pen.)

Bahrain National Stadium, Riffa
Attendance: 2,000
Referee: Khalil Al Ghamdi (Saudi Arabia)

3–3 on aggregate; Al-Muharraq won on away goals.

12 September 2006

Al-Faisaly (Jordan)	1–1	(Hong Kong) Xiangxue Sun Hei
Agel 54'	(Report)	Lee Kin Wo 44'

Amman International Stadium, Amman
Attendance: 3,000
Referee: Tayeb Hasan Shamsuzzaman (Bangladesh)
19 September 2006

Xiangxue Sun Hei (Hong Kong)	1–1 (a.e.t.)	(Jordan) Al-Faisaly
Lo Chi Kwan 21'	(Report)	Abu Keshek 60'
Penalties
	4–5

Hong Kong Stadium, Hong Kong
Attendance: 2,722
Referee: O Il Son

2–2 on aggregate; Al-Faisaly won 5–4 on penalties.

=== Semi-finals ===
==== Summary ====
Team 1	Agg.	Team 2	1st leg	2nd leg
Nejmeh (Lebanon)	3–6	(Bahrain) Al-Muharraq	1–2	2–4
Al-Faisaly (Jordan)	2–1	(Jordan) Al-Wahdat	1–0	1–1

Matches

26 September 2006

Nejmeh (Lebanon)	1–2	(Bahrain) Al-Muharraq
Nasseredine 21'	Report	Babatunde 54'; John 75'

Beirut Sports City Stadium, Beirut
Attendance: 2,000
Referee: Qasem Shaban (Kuwait)
17 October 2006

Al-Muharraq (Bahrain)	4–2	(Lebanon) Nejmeh
de Silva 21' (pen.), 76' (pen.); Omar 29'; Massolin 90+2' (pen.)	(Report)	Mohammed Ghaddar 41', 45+1'

Bahrain National Stadium, Riffa
Attendance: 1,500
Referee: Khalil Al Ghamdi (Saudi Arabia)

Al-Muharraq won 6–3 on aggregate.

26 September 2006

Al-Faisaly (Jordan)	1–0	(Jordan) Al-Wahdat
Al-Maharmeh 9'	(Report)

Amman International Stadium, Amman
Attendance: 17,000
Referee: M Mansour
17 October 2006

Al-Wahdat (Jordan)	1–1	(Jordan) Al-Faisaly
Shelbaieh 53'	(Report)	Abu Keshek 66'

Amman International Stadium, Amman
Attendance: 10,000
Referee: Masoud Moradi (Iran)

Al-Faisaly won 2–1 on aggregate.

=== Final ===
==== Summary ====
Team 1	Agg.	Team 2	1st leg	2nd leg
Al-Faisaly (Jordan)	5–4	(Bahrain) Al-Muharraq	3–0	2–4

==== Matches ====
27 October 2006

Al-Faisaly (Jordan)	3–0	(Bahrain) Al-Muharraq
Al-Maharmeh 54', 83'; Ziyad 60'	(Report)

Amman International Stadium, Amman
Attendance: 7,000
Referee: Mohammed Kousa (Syria)
3 November 2006

Al-Muharraq (Bahrain)	4–2	(Jordan) Al-Faisaly
Omar 18'; da Silva 52'; Meshkhas 60'; Abdulrahman 62'	(Report)	Abdul-Amir 35'; Al-Tall 90+1'

Bahrain National Stadium, Riffa
Attendance: 3,000
Referee: M O Al Saeedi

Al-Faisaly won 5–4 on aggregate.

2006 AFC Cup Winners
Al-Faisaly
Second title
