= Massolin =

Massolin is a surname. Notable people with the surname include:

- Richard Massolin (born 1976), French-Martiniquais footballer
- Yanis Massolin (born 2002), French footballer, son of Richard
