= 2009 Bahraini Crown Prince Cup =

2009 Crown Prince Cup
Tournament details
- Host country: Bahrain
- Dates: 7 July – 12 July
- Teams: 4

Final positions
- Champions: Muharraq Club (4th title)

The 2009 Bahraini Crown Prince Cup was the 9th edition of Bahrain Classification Soccer League 2008-09 season annual football competition for the cup. It was contested by the top-4 teams.

Muharraq Club successfully defended its 2008 title on 12 July 2009 for its 2009 title against Bahrain Riffa Club, 2–0. This was Muharraq's fourth consecutive title, fifth overall.

== 2009 Participants ==
- Muharraq Club : Bahrain Classification Soccer League 2008-09 Champion
- Bahrain Riffa Club : Bahrain Classification Soccer League 2008-09 Runner Up
- Al-Ahli (Manama) : Bahrain Classification Soccer League 2008-09 3rd Place
- East Riffa Club : Bahrain Classification Soccer League 2008-09 4th Place

== Bracket ==
Semi-finals
2009-07-07 - Manama
(Bahrain) Muharraq Club	4
(Bahrain) East Riffa Club	3
2009-07-08 - Manama
Bahrain Riffa Club	1
(Bahrain) Al-Ahli (Manama)	0

Final
2009-07-12 - Manama
(Bahrain) Muharraq Club	2
Bahrain Riffa Club	0

Source: RSSSF

== Matches ==
=== Semi-finals ===
7 July 2009

Muharraq Club	4 – 3	East Riffa Club

8 July 2009

Bahrain Riffa Club	1 – 0	Al-Ahli (Manama)

=== Final ===
12 July 2009

Muharraq Club	2 – 0	Bahrain Riffa Club
Abdullah Saleh 90'; Rico 90+5'

Source: RSSSF

Bahraini Crown Prince Cup
2009 Winners
Muharraq Club
5th Title
4th in a row
