= Hong Kong football clubs in Asian competitions =

Hong Kong clubs participating in the AFC Champions Leagues

This article shows the history of Hong Kong clubs participating in the AFC Champions League Elite and AFC Champions League Two.

In 2026–27 season, Hong Kong was not allocated a direct slot in the new Elite competition format, and instead had two direct spots in the AFC Champions League Two.

== Hong Kong football clubs in the AFC Champions League Elite ==
=== Participations ===
Participations
Team	Appearances	2002–03	2014	2015	2016	2017	2018	2019	2020	2021	2022	2023–24
(Hong Kong) Kitchee	8	•	•	PR2	PR2	PO	GS	PR2	•	GS	R16	GS
(Hong Kong) South China	2	QR4	QR2	•	•	•	•	•	•	•	•	•
(Hong Kong) Eastern	2	•	•	•	•	GS	PR2	•	•	•	•	•
(Hong Kong) Tai Po	1	•	•	•	•	•	•	•	PR2	•	•	•
(Hong Kong) Lee Man	1	•	•	•	•	•	•	•	•	•	•	PR
(Hong Kong) Rangers	1	•	•	•	•	•	•	•	•	•	•	PO

==== Classification ====
R16	Round of 16
GS	Group stage
QR2; QR4; PR; PR2; PO	Qualifying Round 2 Qualifying Round 4 Preliminary Round; Preliminary Round 2 Play-off
•	Did not participate

=== Club statistics ===
==== Eastern ====
===== Results summary =====
Overall								Home						Away					
Pld	W	D	L	GF	GA	GD	Pts	W	D	L	GF	GA	GD	W	D	L	GF	GA	GD
8	0	1	7	3	28	−25	1	0	1	4	3	12	−9	0	0	3	0	16	−16

===== Results =====
Season	Date	Round	Opponent	Results	Venue	Ref.
2017	22 February 2017	Group Stage	(China) Guangzhou Evergrande	0–7	Tianhe Stadium, China	
2017	1 March 2017	Group Stage	(Japan) Kawasaki Frontale	1–1	Mong Kok Stadium, Hong Kong	
2017	14 March 2017	Group Stage	(South Korea) Suwon Samsung Bluewings	0–1	Mong Kok Stadium, Hong Kong	
2017	12 April 2017	Group Stage	(South Korea) Suwon Samsung Bluewings	0–5	Suwon World Cup Stadium, South Korea	
2017	25 April 2017	Group Stage	(China) Guangzhou Evergrande	0–6	Mong Kok Stadium, Hong Kong	
2017	9 May 2017	Group Stage	(Japan) Kawasaki Frontale	0–4	Todoroki Athletics Stadium, Japan	
2018	23 January 2018	Preliminary Round 2	(Vietnam) FLC Thanh Hóa	2–4	Mong Kok Stadium, Hong Kong	

Win Draw Loss

==== Kitchee ====
===== Results summary =====
Overall								Home						Away					
Pld	W	D	L	GF	GA	GD	Pts	W	D	L	GF	GA	GD	W	D	L	GF	GA	GD
28	8	6	14	26	44	−18	30	2	0	5	7	15	−8	6	6	9	19	29	−10

===== Results =====
Season	Date	Round	Opponent	Results	Venue
2015	10 February 2015	Preliminary Round 2	(Thailand) Chonburi	1–4	Chonburi Stadium, Thailand
2016	2 February 2016	Preliminary Round 2	(Vietnam) Hà Nội T&T	0–1	Hàng Đẫy Stadium, Vietnam
2017	25 January 2017	Preliminary Round 2	(Vietnam) Hà Nội T&T	3–2 (a.e.t.)	Hong Kong Stadium, Hong Kong
2017	7 February 2017	Play-off	(South Korea) Ulsan Hyundai	1–1 (a.e.t.); 3–4 (p)	Ulsan Munsu Football Stadium, South Korea
2018	13 February 2018	Group Stage	(China) Tianjin Quanjian	0–3	Tianjin Olympic Center Stadium, China
2018	20 February 2018	Group Stage	(South Korea) Jeonbuk Hyundai Motors	0–6	Hong Kong Stadium, Hong Kong
2018	6 March 2018	Group Stage	(Japan) Kashiwa Reysol	0–1	Kashiwa Soccer Stadium, Japan
2018	14 March 2018	Group Stage	(Japan) Kashiwa Reysol	1–0	Hong Kong Stadium, Hong Kong
2018	4 April 2018	Group Stage	(China) Tianjin Quanjian	0–1	Mong Kok Stadium, Hong Kong
2018	18 April 2018	Group Stage	(South Korea) Jeonbuk Hyundai Motors	0–3	Jeonju World Cup Stadium, South Korea
2019	12 February 2019	Preliminary Round 2	(Malaysia) Perak	1–1 (a.e.t.); 5–6 (p)	Perak Stadium, Malaysia
2021	24 June 2021	Group Stage	(Thailand) Port	2–0	Buriram Stadium, Thailand
2021	27 June 2021	Group Stage	(Japan) Cerezo Osaka	1–2	Buriram Stadium, Thailand
2021	30 June 2021	Group Stage	(China) Guangzhou	1–0	Buriram Stadium, Thailand
2021	3 July 2021	Group Stage	(China) Guangzhou	1–0	Buriram Stadium, Thailand
2021	6 July 2021	Group Stage	(Thailand) Port	0–0	Buriram Stadium, Thailand
2021	9 July 2021	Group Stage	(Japan) Cerezo Osaka	0–0	Buriram Stadium, Thailand
2022	16 April 2022	Group Stage	(Thailand) Chiangrai United	1–0	Buriram City Stadium, Thailand
2022	19 April 2022	Group Stage	(Japan) Vissel Kobe	1–2	Buriram City Stadium, Thailand
2022	28 April 2022	Group Stage	(Thailand) Chiangrai United	3–2	Buriram City Stadium, Thailand
2022	1 May 2022	Group Stage	(Japan) Vissel Kobe	2–2	Buriram City Stadium, Thailand
2022	19 August 2022	Round of 16	(Thailand) BG Pathum United	0–4	Urawa Komaba Stadium, Japan
2023–24	20 September 2023	Group Stage	(South Korea) Jeonbuk Hyundai Motors	1–2	Jeonju World Cup Stadium, South Korea
2023–24	4 October 2023	Group Stage	(Singapore) Lion City Sailors	1–2	Hong Kong Stadium, Hong Kong
2023–24	25 October 2023	Group Stage	(Thailand) Bangkok United	1–2	Hong Kong Stadium, Hong Kong
2023–24	8 November 2023	Group Stage	(Thailand) Bangkok United	1–1	Thammasat Stadium, Thailand
2023–24	29 November 2023	Group Stage	(South Korea) Jeonbuk Hyundai Motors	1–2	Hong Kong Stadium, Hong Kong
2023–24	13 December 2023	Group Stage	(Singapore) Lion City Sailors	2–0	Jalan Besar Stadium, Singapore

Win Draw Loss

==== Lee Man ====
===== Results summary =====
Overall								Home						Away					
Pld	W	D	L	GF	GA	GD	Pts	W	D	L	GF	GA	GD	W	D	L	GF	GA	GD
2	1	0	1	5	4	+1	3	1	0	0	5	1	+4	0	0	1	0	3	−3

===== Results =====
Season	Date	Round	Opponent	Results	Venue
2023–24	16 August 2023	Preliminary	(Indonesia) Bali United	5–1	Hong Kong Stadium, Hong Kong
2023–24	22 August 2023	Preliminary	(Japan) Urawa Red Diamonds	0–3	Saitama Stadium 2002, Japan

Win Draw Loss

==== Rangers ====
===== Results summary =====
Overall								Home						Away					
Pld	W	D	L	GF	GA	GD	Pts	W	D	L	GF	GA	GD	W	D	L	GF	GA	GD
1	0	0	1	1	4	−3	0	0	0	1	1	4	−3	0	0	0	0	0	0

===== Results =====
Season	Date	Round	Opponent	Results	Venue
2023–24	15 August 2023	Preliminary	(Vietnam) Haiphong	1–4	Mong Kok Stadium, Hong Kong

Win Draw Loss

==== South China ====
===== Results summary =====
Overall								Home						Away					
Pld	W	D	L	GF	GA	GD	Pts	W	D	L	GF	GA	GD	W	D	L	GF	GA	GD
6	2	1	3	6	14	−8	7	1	0	1	2	6	−4	1	1	2	4	8	−4

===== Results =====
Season	Date	Round	Opponent	Results	Venue
2002–03		Qualifying Round 3	(Singapore) Home United	2–1	
2002–03		Qualifying Round 3	(Singapore) Home United	1–1	
2002–03		Qualifying Round 4	(Japan) Shimizu S-Pulse	0–5	
2002–03		Qualifying Round 4	(Japan) Shimizu S-Pulse	1–3	
2014	2 February 2014	Qualifying Round 1	(Singapore) Tampines Rovers	2–1	Jalan Besar Stadium, Singapore
2014	9 February 2014	Qualifying Round 2	(Thailand) Chonburi	0–3	Chonburi Stadium, Thailand

Win Draw Loss

==== Tai Po ====
===== Results summary =====
Overall								Home						Away					
Pld	W	D	L	GF	GA	GD	Pts	W	D	L	GF	GA	GD	W	D	L	GF	GA	GD
1	0	0	1	1	5	−4	0	0	0	0	0	0	0	0	0	1	1	5	−4

===== Results =====
Season	Date	Round	Opponent	Results	Venue
2020	21 January 2020	Preliminary Round 2	(Malaysia) Kedah	1–5	Darul Aman Stadium, Malaysia

Win Draw Loss

== Hong Kong football clubs in the AFC Champions League Two ==
=== Participations ===
Participations
Team	Appearances	2004	2005	2006	2007	2008	2009	2010	2011	2012	2013	2014	2015	2016	2019	2021	2022	2024–25	2025–26	2026–27
(Hong Kong) Kitchee	8	•	•	•	•	GS	•	•	•	R16	QF	SF	QF	R16	GS	•	•	•	•	TBD
(Hong Kong) South China	7	•	•	•	•	GS	SF	R16	GS	•	•	GS	QF	QF	•	•	•	•	•	•
(Hong Kong) Eastern	5	•	•	•	•	•	GS	•	•	•	•	•	•	–	•	GS	IPSF	GS	GS	•
(Hong Kong) Happy Valley	4	GS	GS	GS	GS	•	•	•	•	•	•	•	•	–	•	•	•	•	•	•
(Hong Kong) Sun Hei	4	•	SF	QF	QF	•	•	•	•	•	GS	•	•	–	•	•	•	•	•	•
(Hong Kong) Tai Po	4	•	•	•	•	•	•	GS	•	•	•	•	•	–	GS	•	•	•	GS	GS
(Hong Kong) Lee Man	2	•	•	•	•	•	•	•	•	•	•	•	•	–	•	IPF	GS	GS	•	•
(Hong Kong) Citizen	1	•	•	•	•	•	•	•	•	GS	•	•	•	–	•	•	•	•	•	•
(Hong Kong) TSW Pegasus	1	•	•	•	•	•	•	•	GS	•	•	•	•	–	•	•	•	•	•	•

==== Classification ====
SF; IPF	Semi-finals; Inter-zone play-off final
QF; IPSF	Quarter-finals; Inter-zone play-off semi-finals
R16	Round of 16
GS	Group stage
•	Did not participate

=== Club statistics ===
==== Citizen ====
===== Results summary =====
Overall								Home						Away					
Pld	W	D	L	GF	GA	GD	Pts	W	D	L	GF	GA	GD	W	D	L	GF	GA	GD
6	2	1	3	9	12	−3	7	1	1	1	6	6	0	1	0	2	3	6	−3

==== Results ====
Season	Date	Round	Opponent	Results	Venue
2012	7 March 2012	Group Stage	(Singapore) Home United	1–3	Bishan Stadium, Singapore
2012	21 March 2012	Group Stage	(Myanmar) Yangon United	2–1	Mong Kok Stadium, Hong Kong
2012	3 April 2012	Group Stage	(Thailand) Chonburi	0–2	Chonburi Municipality Stadium, Thailand
2012	11 April 2012	Group Stage	(Thailand) Chonburi	3–3	Mong Kok Stadium, Hong Kong
2012	24 April 2012	Group Stage	(Singapore) Home United	1–2	Mong Kok Stadium, Hong Kong
2012	8 May 2012	Group Stage	(Myanmar) Yangon United	2–1	Thuwunna Stadium, Myanmar

Win Draw Loss

==== Eastern ====
===== Results summary =====
Overall								Home						Away					
Pld	W	D	L	GF	GA	GD	Pts	W	D	L	GF	GA	GD	W	D	L	GF	GA	GD
24	7	1	16	26	65	−39	22	4	1	7	14	27	−13	3	0	9	12	38	−26

===== Results =====
Season	Date	Round	Opponent	Results	Venue
2009	10 March 2008	Group Stage	(Thailand) Chonburi	1–4	Suphachalasai Stadium, Thailand
2009	17 March 2009	Group Stage	(Vietnam) Hanoi ACB	3–0	Mong Kok Stadium, Hong Kong
2009	7 April 2009	Group Stage	(Malaysia) Kedah	0–2	Darul Aman Stadium, Malaysia
2009	21 April 2009	Group Stage	(Malaysia) Kedah	3–3	Mong Kok Stadium, Hong Kong
2009	5 May 2009	Group Stage	(Thailand) Chonburi	2–1	Mong Kok Stadium, Hong Kong
2009	19 May 2009	Group Stage	(Vietnam) Hanoi ACB	0–3	Hàng Đẫy Stadium, Vietnam
2021	23 June 2021	Group Stage	(Hong Kong) Lee Man	0–1	Hong Kong Stadium, Hong Kong
2021	26 June 2021	Group Stage	(Mongolia) Athletic 220	1–0	Hong Kong Stadium, Hong Kong
2021	29 June 2021	Group Stage	(Chinese Taipei) Tainan City	1–0	Hong Kong Stadium, Hong Kong
2022	24 June 2022	Group Stage	(Hong Kong) Lee Man	3–1	Buriram Stadium, Thailand
2022	30 June 2022	Group Stage	(Chinese Taipei) Tainan City	3–1	Buriram Stadium, Thailand
2022	6 September 2022	Inter-zone play-off semi-final	(Uzbekistan) Sogdiana Jizzakh	0–1	Sogdiyona Sport Majmuasi, Uzbekistan
2024–25	19 September 2024	Group Stage	(Australia) Sydney FC	0–5	Jubilee Oval, Australia
2024–25	3 October 2024	Group Stage	(Japan) Sanfrecce Hiroshima	2–3	Mong Kok Stadium, Hong Kong
2024–25	25 October 2024	Group Stage	(Philippines) Kaya–Iloilo	2–1	Rizal Memorial Stadium, Philippines
2024–25	7 November 2024	Group Stage	(Philippines) Kaya–Iloilo	1–2	Mong Kok Stadium, Hong Kong
2024–25	28 November 2024	Group Stage	(Australia) Sydney FC	1–4	Mong Kok Stadium, Hong Kong
2024–25	5 December 2024	Group Stage	(Japan) Sanfrecce Hiroshima	1–4	Edion Peace Wing Hiroshima, Japan
2025–26	19 September 2025	Group Stage	(Japan) Gamba Osaka	1–3	Suita City Football Stadium, Japan
2025–26	2 October 2025	Group Stage	(Vietnam) Nam Dinh	0–1	Mong Kok Stadium, Hong Kong
2025–26	22 October 2025	Group Stage	(Thailand) Ratchaburi	1–5	Dragon Solar Park, Thailand
2025–26	5 November 2025	Group Stage	(Thailand) Ratchaburi	0–7	Mong Kok Stadium, Hong Kong
2025–26	27 November 2025	Group Stage	(Japan) Gamba Osaka	0–5	Mong Kok Stadium, Hong Kong
2025–26	11 December 2025	Group Stage	(Vietnam) Nam Dinh	0–9	Thiên Trường Stadium, Vietnam

Win Draw Loss

==== Happy Valley ====
===== Results summary =====
Overall								Home						Away					
Pld	W	D	L	GF	GA	GD	Pts	W	D	L	GF	GA	GD	W	D	L	GF	GA	GD
24	5	2	17	28	54	−26	17	4	1	7	15	22	−7	1	1	10	13	32	−19

===== Results =====
Season	Date	Round	Opponent	Results	Venue
2004	11 February 2004	Group Stage	(Singapore) Home United	1–5	Bishan Stadium, Singapore
2004	25 February 2004	Group Stage	(Malaysia) Perak	1–2	Mong Kok Stadium, Hong Kong
2004	6 April 2004	Group Stage	(Maldives) Valencia FC	1–2	Galolhu National Stadium, Maldives
2004	21 April 2004	Group Stage	(Maldives) Valencia FC	3–1	Mong Kok Stadium, Hong Kong
2004	5 May 2004	Group Stage	(Singapore) Home United	0–2	Mong Kok Stadium, Hong Kong
2004	19 May 2004	Group Stage	(Malaysia) Perak	1–2	Perak Stadium, Malaysia
2005	9 March 2005	Group Stage	(Maldives) New Radiant	0–2	Rasmee Dhandu Stadium, Maldives
2005	16 March 2005	Group Stage	(Singapore) Home United	0–1	Mong Kok Stadium, Hong Kong
2005	6 April 2005	Group Stage	(Malaysia) Pahang	1–1	Mong Kok Stadium, Hong Kong
2005	20 April 2005	Group Stage	(Malaysia) Pahang	1–3	Darulmakmur Stadium, Malaysia
2005	11 May 2005	Group Stage	(Maldives) New Radiant	0–2	Mong Kok Stadium, Hong Kong
2005	25 May 2005	Group Stage	(Singapore) Home United	0–5	Bishan Stadium, Singapore
2006	7 March 2006	Group Stage	(Maldives) Hurriyya	3–0	Mong Kok Stadium, Hong Kong
2006	21 March 2006	Group Stage	(Singapore) Tampines Rovers	1–3	Tampines Stadium, Singapore
2006	11 April 2006	Group Stage	(Malaysia) Selangor	3–4	Stadium Nasional Bukit Jalil, Malaysia
2006	25 April 2006	Group Stage	(Malaysia) Selangor	2–3	Mong Kok Stadium, Hong Kong
2006	2 May 2006	Group Stage	(Maldives) Hurriyya	1–1	Rasmee Dhandu Stadium, Maldives
2006	16 May 2006	Group Stage	(Singapore) Tampines Rovers	0–4	Mong Kok Stadium, Hong Kong
2007	6 March 2007	Group Stage	(Maldives) New Radiant	2–0	Rasmee Dhandu Stadium, Maldives
2007	20 March 2007	Group Stage	Singapore Armed Forces	1–4	Mong Kok Stadium, Hong Kong
2007	10 April 2007	Group Stage	(India) Mahindra United	1–3	Fatorda Stadium, India
2007	24 April 2007	Group Stage	(India) Mahindra United	2–1	Mong Kok Stadium, Hong Kong
2007	8 May 2007	Group Stage	(Maldives) New Radiant	2–1	Mong Kok Stadium, Hong Kong
2007	22 May 2007	Group Stage	Singapore Armed Forces	1–2	Choa Chu Kang Stadium, Singapore

Win Draw Loss

==== Kitchee ====
===== Results summary =====
Overall								Home						Away					
Pld	W	D	L	GF	GA	GD	Pts	W	D	L	GF	GA	GD	W	D	L	GF	GA	GD
59	27	12	20	97	71	+26	93	15	7	8	55	29	+26	12	5	12	42	42	0

===== Results =====
Season	Date	Round	Opponent	Results	Venue
2008	11 March 2008	Group Stage	Singapore Armed Forces	0–4	Jalan Besar Stadium, Singapore
2008	18 March 2008	Group Stage	(Maldives) New Radiant	2–0	Mong Kok Stadium, Hong Kong
2008	3 April 2008	Group Stage	(Malaysia) Perak	1–2	Perak Stadium, Malaysia
2008	16 April 2008	Group Stage	(Malaysia) Perak	2–2	Mong Kok Stadium, Hong Kong
2008	30 April 2008	Group Stage	Singapore Armed Forces	0–2	Mong Kok Stadium, Hong Kong
2008	14 May 2008	Group Stage	(Maldives) New Radiant	1–2	Maldives National Stadium, Maldives
2012	6 March 2012	Group Stage	(Singapore) Tampines Rovers	3–1	Tseung Kwan O Sports Ground, Hong Kong
2012	20 March 2012	Group Stage	(Malaysia) Terengganu	2–0	Sultan Ismail Nasiruddin Shah Stadium, Malaysia
2012	4 April 2012	Group Stage	(Vietnam) Sông Lam Nghệ An	2–0	Tseung Kwan O Sports Ground, Hong Kong
2012	10 April 2012	Group Stage	(Vietnam) Sông Lam Nghệ An	0–1	Vinh Stadium, Vietnam
2012	25 April 2012	Group Stage	(Singapore) Tampines Rovers	0–0	Jalan Besar Stadium, Singapore
2012	9 May 2012	Group Stage	(Malaysia) Terengganu	2–2	Tseung Kwan O Sports Ground, Hong Kong
2012	23 May 2012	Round of 16	(Indonesia) Arema	0–2	Tseung Kwan O Sports Ground, Hong Kong
2013	26 February 2013	Group Stage	(India) Churchill Brothers	3–0	Mong Kok Stadium, Hong Kong
2013	12 March 2013	Group Stage	(Singapore) Warriors	4–2	Jalan Besar Stadium, Singapore
2013	2 April 2013	Group Stage	(Indonesia) Semen Padang	1–2	Mong Kok Stadium, Hong Kong
2013	10 April 2013	Group Stage	(Indonesia) Semen Padang	1–3	Haji Agus Salim Stadium, Indonesia
2013	24 April 2013	Group Stage	(India) Churchill Brothers	4–0	Shree Shiv Chhatrapati Sports Complex, India
2013	1 May 2013	Group Stage	(Singapore) Warriors	5–0	Mong Kok Stadium, Hong Kong
2013	14 May 2013	Round of 16	(Malaysia) Kelantan	2–0	Sultan Mohammad IV Stadium, Malaysia
2013	17 September 2013	Quarter-finals	(Jordan) Al-Faisaly	1–2	Mong Kok Stadium, Hong Kong
2013	24 September 2013	Quarter-finals	(Jordan) Al-Faisaly	1–2	Amman International Stadium, Jordan
2014	26 February 2014	Group Stage	(Singapore) Tampines Rovers	5–0	Jalan Besar Stadium, Singapore
2014	12 March 2014	Group Stage	(India) Pune	2–2	Mong Kok Stadium, Hong Kong
2014	19 March 2014	Group Stage	(Myanmar) Nay Pyi Taw	2–0	Mong Kok Stadium, Hong Kong
2014	1 April 2014	Group Stage	(Myanmar) Nay Pyi Taw	2–1	Paung Laung Stadium, Malaysia
2014	8 April 2014	Group Stage	(Singapore) Tampines Rovers	4–0	Mong Kok Stadium, Hong Kong
2014	22 April 2014	Group Stage	(India) Pune	0–2	Shree Shiv Chhatrapati Sports Complex, India
2014	14 May 2014	Round of 16	(Indonesia) Arema Cronus	2–0	Mong Kok Stadium, Hong Kong
2014	19 August 2014	Quarter-finals	(Vietnam) Vissai Ninh Bình	4–2	Ninh Bình Stadium, Ninh Bình
2014	26 August 2014	Quarter-finals	(Vietnam) Vissai Ninh Bình	0–1	Mong Kok Stadium, Hong Kong
2014	16 September 2014	Semi-finals	(Iraq) Erbil	1–1	Prince Mohammed Stadium, Jordan
2014	20 September 2014	Semi-finals	(Iraq) Erbil	1–2	Mong Kok Stadium, Hong Kong
2015	24 February 2015	Group Stage	(Singapore) Balestier Khalsa	3–0	Mong Kok Stadium, Hong Kong
2015	10 March 2015	Group Stage	(India) East Bengal	1–1	Salt Lake Stadium, India
2015	17 March 2015	Group Stage	(Malaysia) Johor Darul Ta'zim	2–0	Mong Kok Stadium, Hong Kong
2015	14 April 2015	Group Stage	(Malaysia) Johor Darul Ta'zim	0–2	Larkin Stadium, Malaysia
2015	28 April 2015	Group Stage	(Singapore) Balestier Khalsa	2–1	Jalan Besar Stadium, Singapore
2015	12 May 2015	Group Stage	(India) East Bengal	2–2	Mong Kok Stadium, Hong Kong
2015	27 May 2015	Round of 16	(Indonesia) Persib Bandung	2–0	Jalak Harupat Stadium, Indonesia
2015	26 August 2015	Quarter-finals	Al-Kuwait	0–6	Al Kuwait Sports Club Stadium, Kuwait
2015	16 September 2015	Quarter-finals	Al-Kuwait	1–1	Mong Kok Stadium, Hong Kong
2016	23 February 2016	Group Stage	(Philippines) Kaya–Iloilo	1–0	Mong Kok Stadium, Hong Kong
2016	8 March 2016	Group Stage	(Singapore) Balestier Khalsa	0–1	Jalan Besar Stadium, Singapore
2016	15 March 2016	Group Stage	(Maldives) New Radiant	0–0	Mong Kok Stadium, Hong Kong
2016	12 April 2016	Group Stage	(Maldives) New Radiant	2–0	National Football Stadium, Maldives
2016	26 April 2016	Group Stage	(Philippines) Kaya–Iloilo	1–0	Rizal Memorial Stadium, Philippines
2016	10 May 2016	Group Stage	(Singapore) Balestier Khalsa	4–0	Mong Kok Stadium, Hong Kong
2016	25 May 2016	Round of 16	(India) Bengaluru	2–3	Mong Kok Stadium, Hong Kong
2019	3 April 2019	Group Stage	(Hong Kong) Tai Po	2–4	Mong Kok Stadium, Hong Kong
2019	17 April 2019	Group Stage	(North Korea) April 25	0–2	Kim Il-sung Stadium, North Korea
2019	1 May 2019	Group Stage	(Chinese Taipei) Hang Yuen	3–0	Mong Kok Stadium, Hong Kong
2019	15 May 2019	Group Stage	(Chinese Taipei) Hang Yuen	2–1	Taipei Municipal Stadium, Taipei
2019	19 June 2019	Group Stage	(Hong Kong) Tai Po	3–3	Mong Kok Stadium, Hong Kong
2019	26 June 2019	Group Stage	(North Korea) April 25	1–0	Mong Kok Stadium, Hong Kong
2026–27	17 September 2026	Group Stage	(South Korea) Gangwon FC	0–0	Mong Kok Stadium, Hong Kong
2026–27	15 October 2026	Group Stage	(Malaysia) Kuching City	1–1	Tan Sri Dato' Haji Hassan Yunos Stadium, Malaysia
2026–27	29 October 2026	Group Stage	(Cambodia) Phnom Penh Crown	0–2	Morodok Techo National Stadium, Cambodiia
2026–27	5 November 2026	Group Stage	(Cambodia) Phnom Penh Crown	2–1	Mong Kok Stadium, Hong Kong
2026–27	26 November 2026	Group Stage	(South Korea) Gangwon FC	–	Gangneung Stadium, South Korea
2026–27	3 December 2026	Group Stage	(Malaysia) Kuching City	–	Mong Kok Stadium, Hong Kong

3. Teams from Iraq were not allowed to host their home matches in their country due to security concerns.

Win Draw Loss

==== Lee Man ====
===== Results summary =====
Overall								Home						Away					
Pld	W	D	L	GF	GA	GD	Pts	W	D	L	GF	GA	GD	W	D	L	GF	GA	GD
13	5	1	7	20	23	−3	16	2	1	2	7	5	+2	3	0	5	13	18	−5

===== Results =====
Season	Date	Round	Opponent	Results	Venue
2021	23 June 2021	Group Stage	(Hong Kong) Eastern	1–0	Hong Kong Stadium, Hong Kong
2021	26 June 2021	Group Stage	(Chinese Taipei) Tainan City	4–1	Tseung Kwan O Sports Ground, Hong Kong
2021	29 June 2021	Group Stage	(Mongolia) Athletic 220	5–1	Tseung Kwan O Sports Ground, Hong Kong
2021	20 October 2021	Inter-zone play-off final	(Uzbekistan) Nasaf	2–3 (a.e.t.)	Markaziy Stadium, Uzbekistan
2022	19 April 2022	Qualifying play-off round	(Mongolia) Athletic 220	2–1	MFF Football Centre, Mongolia
2022	24 June 2022	Group Stage	(Hong Kong) Eastern	1–3	Buriram Stadium, Thailand
2022	27 June 2022	Group Stage	(Chinese Taipei) Tainan City	3–1	Buriram Stadium, Thailand
2024–25	18 September 2024	Group Stage	(Vietnam) Nam Dinh	0–2	Mong Kok Stadium, Hong Kong
2024–25	2 October 2024	Group Stage	(Singapore) Tampines Rovers	1–3	Jalan Besar Stadium, Singapore
2024–25	24 October 2024	Group Stage	(Thailand) Bangkok United	0–1	Mong Kok Stadium, Hong Kong
2024–25	6 November 2024	Group Stage	(Thailand) Bangkok United	1–4	Thammasat Stadium, Thailand
2024–25	27 November 2024	Group Stage	(Vietnam) Nam Dinh	0–3	Thiên Trường Stadium, Vietnam
2024–25	4 December 2024	Group Stage	(Singapore) Tampines Rovers	0–0	Mong Kok Stadium, Hong Kong

Win Draw Loss

==== South China ====
===== Results summary =====
Overall								Home						Away					
Pld	W	D	L	GF	GA	GD	Pts	W	D	L	GF	GA	GD	W	D	L	GF	GA	GD
53	23	9	21	98	78	+20	78	17	4	7	57	34	+23	6	5	14	41	44	−3

===== Results =====
Season	Date	Round	Opponent	Results	Venue
2008	11 March 2008	Group Stage	(Singapore) Home United	2–3	Mong Kok Stadium, Hong Kong
2008	18 March 2008	Group Stage	(Maldives) Victory	0–0	Rasmee Dhandu Stadium, Maldives
2008	3 April 2008	Group Stage	(Malaysia) Kedah	1–3	Mong Kok Stadium, Hong Kong
2008	16 April 2008	Group Stage	(Malaysia) Kedah	0–3	Darul Aman Stadium, Malaysia
2008	30 April 2008	Group Stage	(Singapore) Home United	1–4	Jalan Besar Stadium, Singapore
2008	14 May 2008	Group Stage	(Maldives) Victory	3–0	Mong Kok Stadium, Hong Kong
2009	10 March 2009	Group Stage	(Indonesia) PSMS Medan	3–0	Mong Kok Stadium, Hong Kong
2009	17 March 2009	Group Stage	(Maldives) VB	2–1	Rasmee Dhandu Stadium, Maldives
2009	7 April 2009	Group Stage	(Malaysia) Johor FC	2–0	Mong Kok Stadium, Hong Kong
2009	21 April 2009	Group Stage	(Malaysia) Johor FC	4–1	Pasir Gudang Corporation Stadium, Malaysia
2009	5 May 2009	Group Stage	(Indonesia) PSMS Medan	2–2	Jakabaring Stadium, Indonesia
2009	19 May 2009	Group Stage	(Maldives) VB	2–1	Mong Kok Stadium, Hong Kong
2009	23 June 2009	Round of 16	(Singapore) Home United	4–0	Hong Kong Stadium, Hong Kong
2009	15 September 2009	Quarter-finals	(Uzbekistan) Neftchi Farg'ona	4–5	Fargona Stadium, Uzbekistan
2009	22 September 2009	Quarter-finals	(Uzbekistan) Neftchi Farg'ona	1–0	Hong Kong Stadium, Hong Kong
2009	15 October 2009	Semi-finals	Al-Kuwait	1–2	Al Kuwait Sports Club Stadium, Kuwait
2009	21 October 2009	Semi-finals	Al-Kuwait	0–1	Hong Kong Stadium, Hong Kong
2010	24 February 2010	Group Stage	(Thailand) Muangthong United	0–0	Hong Kong Stadium, Hong Kong
2010	17 March 2010	Group Stage	(Maldives) VB	0–1	Rasmee Dhandu Stadium, Maldives
2010	24 March 2010	Group Stage	(Indonesia) Persiwa Wamena	6–3	Siu Sai Wan Sports Ground, Hong Kong
2010	6 April 2010	Group Stage	(Indonesia) Persiwa Wamena	2–0	Gajayana Stadium, Indonesia
2010	20 April 2010	Group Stage	(Thailand) Muangthong United	1–0	Surakul Stadium, Thailand
2010	27 April 2010	Group Stage	(Maldives) VB	3–1	Hong Kong Stadium, Hong Kong
2010	11 May 2010	Round of 16	(Bahrain) Al-Riffa	1–3	Hong Kong Stadium, Hong Kong
2011	2 March 2011	Group Stage	(Indonesia) Persipura Jayapura	1–1	Hong Kong Stadium, Hong Kong
2011	16 March 2011	Group Stage	(Thailand) Chonburi	0–3	IPE Chonburi Stadium, Thailand
2011	13 April 2011	Group Stage	(India) Kingfisher East Bengal	1–0	Hong Kong Stadium, Hong Kong
2011	26 April 2011	Group Stage	(India) Kingfisher East Bengal	3–3	Barabati Stadium, India
2011	3 May 2011	Group Stage	(Indonesia) Persipura Jayapura	2–4	Mandala Stadium, Indonesia
2011	10 May 2011	Group Stage	(Thailand) Chonburi	0–3	Hong Kong Stadium, Hong Kong
2014	26 February 2014	Group Stage	(Vietnam) Vissai Ninh Bình	1–3	Hong Kong Stadium, Hong Kong
2014	12 March 2014	Group Stage	(Malaysia) Kelantan	0–2	Sultan Mohammad IV Stadium, Malaysia
2014	18 March 2014	Group Stage	(Myanmar) Yangon United	0–2	Thuwunna Stadium, Myanmar
2014	2 April 2014	Group Stage	(Myanmar) Yangon United	5–3	Mong Kok Stadium, Hong Kong
2014	8 April 2011	Group Stage	(Vietnam) Vissai Ninh Bình	1–1	Ninh Bình Stadium, Vietnam
2014	22 April 2014	Group Stage	(Malaysia) Kelantan	4–1	Mong Kok Stadium, Hong Kong
2015 AFC Cup	25 February 2015	Group Stage	(Philippines) Global	6–1	Rizal Memorial Stadium, Philippines
2015	11 March 2015	Group Stage	(Myanmar) Yadanarbon	3–1	Hong Kong Stadium, Hong Kong
2015	18 March 2015	Group Stage	(Malaysia) Pahang	1–0	Darul Makmur Stadium, Malaysia
2015	15 April 2015	Group Stage	(Malaysia) Pahang	3–1	Hong Kong Stadium, Hong Kong
2015	29 April 2015	Group Stage	(Philippines) Global	3–0	Hong Kong Stadium, Hong Kong
2015	13 May 2015	Group Stage	(Myanmar) Yadanarbon	3–0	Mandalarthiri Stadium, Myanmar
2015	26 May 2015	Round of 16	(India) Bengaluru	2–0	Mong Kok Stadium, Hong Kong
2015	25 August 2015	Quarter-finals	(Malaysia) Johor Darul Ta'zim	1–1	Larkin Stadium, Malaysia
2015	15 September 2015	Quarter-finals	(Malaysia) Johor Darul Ta'zim	1–3	Mong Kok Stadium, Hong Kong
2016	24 February 2016	Group Stage	(Myanmar) Yangon United	1–2	Thuwunna Stadium, Myanmar
2016	9 March 2016	Group Stage	(India) Mohun Bagan	0–4	Mong Kok Stadium, Hong Kong
2016	16 March 2016	Group Stage	(Maldives) Maziya	1–2	National Football Stadium, Maldives
2016	13 April 2016	Group Stage	(Maldives) Maziya	2–0	Mong Kok Stadium, Hong Kong
2016	27 April 2016	Group Stage	(Myanmar) Yangon United	2–1	Mong Kok Stadium, Hong Kong
2016	11 May 2016	Group Stage	(India) Mohun Bagan	3–0	Indira Gandhi Athletic Stadium, India
2016	24 May 2016	Round of 16	(Philippines) Ceres	1–0 (a.e.t.)	Panaad Park and Stadium, Bacolod
2016	13 September 2016	Quarter-finals	(Malaysia) Johor Darul Ta'zim	1–1	Mong Kok Stadium, Hong Kong
2016	20 September 2016	Quarter-finals	(Malaysia) Johor Darul Ta'zim	1–2	Larkin Stadium, Malaysia

Win Draw Loss

==== Sun Hei ====
===== Results summary =====
Overall								Home						Away					
Pld	W	D	L	GF	GA	GD	Pts	W	D	L	GF	GA	GD	W	D	L	GF	GA	GD
32	14	7	11	58	41	+17	49	8	3	5	40	22	+18	6	4	6	18	19	−1

===== Results =====
Season	Date	Round	Opponent	Results	Venue
2005	9 March 2005	Group Stage	(Maldives) Club Valencia	6–1	Mong Kok Stadium, Hong Kong
2005	16 March 2005	Group Stage	(Singapore) Tampines Rovers	1–1	Tampines Stadium, Singapore
2005	6 April 2005	Group Stage	(Malaysia) Perak	1–0	Perak Stadium, Malaysia
2005	20 April 2005	Group Stage	(Malaysia) Pahang	2–1	Mong Kok Stadium, Hong Kong
2005	11 May 2005	Group Stage	(Maldives) Club Valencia	1–1	Rasmee Dhandu Stadium, Maldives
2005	25 May 2005	Group Stage	(Singapore) Tampines Rovers	1–1	Mong Kok Stadium, Hong Kong
2005	14 September 2005	Quarter-finals	(Lebanon) Al-Ahed	0–1	Beirut Municipal Stadium, Lebanon
2005	21 September 2005	Quarter-finals	(Lebanon) Al-Ahed	3–1	Hong Kong Stadium, Hong Kong
2005	28 September 2005	Semi-finals	(Lebanon) Al-Nejmeh Beirut	0–3	Beirut Municipal Stadium, Lebanon
2005	12 October 2005	Semi-finals	(Lebanon) Al-Nejmeh Beirut	2–3	Hong Kong Stadium, Hong Kong
2006	7 March 2006	Group Stage	(Maldives) New Radiant	2–0	Rasmee Dhandu Stadium, Maldives
2006	21 March 2006	Group Stage	(Singapore) Home United	0–1	Mong Kok Stadium, Hong Kong
2006	11 April 2006	Group Stage	(Malaysia) Perlis	0–0	Mong Kok Stadium, Hong Kong
2006	25 April 2006	Group Stage	(Malaysia) Perlis	2–1	Utama Negeri Stadium, Malaysia
2006	3 May 2006	Group Stage	(Maldives) New Radiant	5–2	Mong Kok Stadium, Hong Kong
2006	16 May 2006	Group Stage	(Singapore) Home United	2–0	Bishan Stadium, Singapore
2006	12 September 2006	Quarter-finals	(Jordan) Al-Faisaly	1–1	Amman International Stadium, Jordan
2006	19 September 2006	Quarter-finals	(Jordan) Al-Faisaly	1–1 (a.e.t.); 4–5 (p)	Hong Kong Stadium, Hong Kong
2007	6 March 2007	Group Stage	(Maldives) Victory	2–0	Mong Kok Stadium, Hong Kong
2007	20 March 2007	Group Stage	(Vietnam) Hòa Phát Hà Nội	2–1	Hàng Đẫy Stadium, Vietnam
2007	10 April 2007	Group Stage	(Malaysia) Negeri Sembilan	2–0	Mong Kok Stadium, Hong Kong
2007	24 April 2007	Group Stage	(Malaysia) Negeri Sembilan	0–1	Tuanku Abdul Rahman Stadium, Malaysia
2007	9 May 2007	Group Stage	(Maldives) Victory	2–0	Rasmee Dhandu Stadium, Maldives
2007	22 May 2007	Group Stage	(Vietnam) Hòa Phát Hà Nội	7–4	Mong Kok Stadium, Hong Kong
2007	18 September 2007	Quarter-finals	(Jordan) Al-Wehdat	0–1	Mong Kok Stadium, Hong Kong
2007	25 September 2007	Quarter-finals	(Jordan) King Abdullah Stadium	1–3	King Abdullah Stadium, Jordan
2013	5 March 2013	Group Stage	(Maldives) New Radiant	0–1	Rasmee Dhandu Stadium, Maldives
2013	12 March 2013	Group Stage	(Myanmar) Yangon United	1–3	Mong Kok Stadium, Hong Kong
2013	3 April 2013	Group Stage	(Indonesia) Persibo Bojonegoro	3–3	Manahan Stadium, Indonesia
2013	9 April 2013	Group Stage	(Indonesia) Persibo Bojonegoro	8–0^{1}	Mong Kok Stadium, Hong Kong
2013	24 April 2013	Group Stage	(Maldives) New Radiant	0–3	Mong Kok Stadium, Hong Kong
2013	1 May 2013	Group Stage	(Myanmar) Yangon United	0–2	Thuwunna Stadium, Myanmar

Win Draw Loss
Remarks:
^{1} Sun Hei v Persibo Bojonegoro was abandoned in the 65th minute with Sun Hei leading 8–0 after a series of injuries left Persibo Bojonegoro with only six players on the field and below the legal limit. The AFC decided that the result stood according to the regulations of the competition.

==== Tai Po ====
===== Results summary =====
Overall								Home						Away					
Pld	W	D	L	GF	GA	GD	Pts	W	D	L	GF	GA	GD	W	D	L	GF	GA	GD
23	4	7	12	24	48	−24	19	3	4	5	16	20	−4	1	3	7	8	28	−20

===== Results =====
Season	Date	Round	Opponent	Results	Venue
2010	24 February 2010	Group Stage	(Singapore) Geylang United	1–1	Jalan Besar Stadium, Singapore
2010	17 March 2010	Group Stage	(Thailand) Thai Port	0–1	Tseung Kwan O Sports Ground, Hong Kong
2010	24 March 2010	Group Stage	(Vietnam) SHB Đà Nẵng	0–3	Chi Lăng Stadium, Vietnam
2010	6 April 2010	Group Stage	(Vietnam) SHB Đà Nẵng	1–2	Tseung Kwan O Sports Ground, Hong Kong
2010	20 April 2010	Group Stage	(Singapore) Geylang United	1–1	Tseung Kwan O Sports Ground, Hong Kong
2010	27 April 2010	Group Stage	(Thailand) Thai Port	0–2	Surakul Stadium, Thailand
2019	6 March 2019	Play-off	(North Korea) Ryomyong	0–0	Kim Il-sung Stadium, North Korea
2019	13 March 2019	Play-off	(North Korea) Ryomyong	0–0 (a.e.t.)	Mong Kok Stadium, Hong Kong
2019	3 April 2019	Group Stage	(Hong Kong) Kitchee	4–2	Mong Kok Stadium, Hong Kong
2019	17 April 2019	Group Stage	(Chinese Taipei) Hang Yuen	4–2	Mong Kok Stadium, Hong Kong
2019	30 April 2019	Group Stage	(North Korea) April 25	1–3	Mong Kok Stadium, Hong Kong
2019	15 May 2019	Group Stage	(North Korea) April 25	0–4	Kim Il-sung Stadium, North Korea
2019	19 June 2019	Group Stage	(Hong Kong) Kitchee	3–3	Mong Kok Stadium, Hong Kong
2019	26 June 2019	Group Stage	(Chinese Taipei) Hang Yuen	1–1	Taipei Municipal Stadium, Taipei
2025–26	18 September 2025	Group Stage	(Australia) Macarthur	2–1	Mong Kok Stadium, Hong Kong
2025–26	2 October 2025	Group Stage	(Vietnam) Công An Hà Nội	0–3	Hàng Đẫy Stadium, Vietnam
2025–26	23 October 2025	Group Stage	(China) Beijing Guoan	3–3	Mong Kok Stadium, Hong Kong
2025–26	6 November 2025	Group Stage	(China) Beijing Guoan	0–3	Workers' Stadium, China
2025–26	27 November 2025	Group Stage	(Australia) Macarthur	1–2	Campbelltown Sports Stadium, Australia
2025–26	11 December 2025	Group Stage	(Vietnam) Công An Hà Nội	1–0	Mong Kok Stadium, Hong Kong
2026–27	17 September 2026	Group Stage	(Australia) Adelaide United	0–3	Hindmarsh Stadium, Australia
2026–27	15 October 2026	Group Stage	(Singapore) Lion City Sailors	0–1	Mong Kok Stadium, Hong Kong
2026–27	29 October 2026	Group Stage	(Thailand) BG Pathum United	0–3	Mong Kok Stadium, Hong Kong
2026–27	5 November 2026	Group Stage	(Thailand) BG Pathum United	1–4	True BG Stadium, Thailand
2026–27	26 November 2026	Group Stage	(Australia) Adelaide United	–	Mong Kok Stadium, Hong Kong
2026–27	3 December 2026	Group Stage	(Singapore) Lion City Sailors	–	Jalan Besar Stadium, Singapore

Win Draw Loss

==== TSW Pegasus ====
===== Results summary =====
Overall								Home						Away					
Pld	W	D	L	GF	GA	GD	Pts	W	D	L	GF	GA	GD	W	D	L	GF	GA	GD
6	3	0	3	15	12	+3	9	1	0	2	6	5	+1	2	0	1	9	7	+2

===== Results =====
Season	Date	Round	Opponent	Results	Venue
2011	1 March 2011	Group Stage	(Vietnam) Sông Lam Nghệ An	2–1	Vinh Stadium, Vietnam
2011	15 March 2011	Group Stage	(Indonesia) Sriwijaya	1–2	Tseung Kwan O Sports Ground, Hong Kong
2011	13 April 2011	Group Stage	(Maldives) VB	5–3	Rasmee Dhandu Stadium, Maldives
2011	26 April 2011	Group Stage	(Maldives) VB	3–0	Tseung Kwan O Sports Ground, Hong Kong
2011	4 May 2011	Group Stage	(Vietnam) Sông Lam Nghệ An	2–3	Tseung Kwan O Sports Ground, Hong Kong
2011	11 May 2011	Group Stage	(Indonesia) Sriwijaya	2–3	Jakabaring Stadium, Indonesia

Win Draw Loss
