= 2005–06 Jordan League =

Football tournament

Jordan Premier League
- Season: 2005-2006
- Champions: Shabab Al-Ordon (1st title)
- Relegated: Kfarsoum; Shabab Al-Hussein (expelled)
- AFC Cup: Shabab Al-Ordon; Al-Wehdat; Al-Faisaly
- Matches: 90
- Goals: 263 (2.92 per match)
- Top goalscorer: Abdel-Hadi Al-Maharmeh (Al-Faisaly-14 goals)

The 2005–2006 Jordan League was the 54th season of Jordan Premier League, the top-flight league for Jordanian association football clubs. Shabab Al-Ordon won the championship for the first time, while Kfarsoum was relegated and Shabab Al-Hussein were expelled. A total of 10 teams participated.

== Teams ==
Jordanian League 2005–2006
| Club | Location | Stadium | Capacity | Year formed |
|---|---|---|---|---|
| Al-Faisaly | Amman | Amman International Stadium | 17,619 | 1932 |
| Al-Hussein | Irbid | Al-Hassan Stadium | 12,000 | 1964 |
| Kfarsoum | Irbid Governorate | Al-Hassan Stadium | 12,000 | 1973 |
| Al-Jazeera | Amman | Amman International Stadium | 17,619 | 1947 |
| Al-Ramtha | Ar Ramtha | Al-Hassan Stadium | 12,000 | 1966 |
| Shabab Al-Ordon | Amman | King Abdullah Stadium | 14,000 | 2002 |
| Al-Wehdat | Amman | King Abdullah Stadium | 14,000 | 1956 |
| Shabab Al-Hussein | Amman | Amman International Stadium | 17,619 | 1954 |
| Al-Baqa'a | Balqa Governorate | Amman International Stadium | 17,619 | 1968 |
| Al-Yarmouk | Amman | Amman International Stadium | 17,619 | 1967 |

=== Map ===
Location of clubs in Jordan for the 2005-2006 Premier League season

== League standings ==
| Pos | Team | Pld | W | D | L | GF | GA | GD | Pts | Relegation |
|---|---|---|---|---|---|---|---|---|---|---|
| 1 | Shabab Al-Ordon | 18 | 13 | 3 | 2 | 41 | 19 | +22 | 42 | Champions |
| 2 | Al-Faisaly | 18 | 12 | 4 | 2 | 35 | 13 | +22 | 40 | |
| 3 | Al-Wehdat | 18 | 10 | 5 | 3 | 35 | 18 | +17 | 35 | |
| 4 | Al-Hussein Irbid | 18 | 8 | 4 | 6 | 26 | 21 | +5 | 28 | |
| 5 | Al-Ramtha | 18 | 7 | 5 | 6 | 23 | 28 | −5 | 26 | |
| 6 | Al-Baqa'a | 18 | 6 | 4 | 8 | 23 | 23 | 0 | 22 | |
| 7 | Al-Yarmouk | 18 | 4 | 5 | 9 | 19 | 29 | −10 | 17 | |
| 8 | Shabab Al-Hussein | 18 | 4 | 3 | 11 | 25 | 37 | −12 | 15 | Expelled |
| 9 | Al-Jazeera | 18 | 3 | 5 | 10 | 19 | 33 | −14 | 14 | |
| 10 | Kfarsoum | 18 | 2 | 4 | 12 | 17 | 42 | −25 | 10 | Relegated |

Source: RSSSF
