= Hassan Nasrallah (disambiguation) =

Hassan Nasrallah (1960–2024) was a Lebanese cleric and political leader, and third secretary-general of Hezbollah.

Hassan Nasrallah may also refer to:

- Hassan Nasrallah (businessman) (1881–1959), Iraqi businessman
- Hassan Nasrallah (footballer) (born 1982), Lebanese footballer
