= Yanis Massolin =

French footballer (born 2002)

Personal information
- Date of birth: 20 September 2002 (age 24)
- Place of birth: Moulins, France
- Height: 1.97 m (6 ft 6 in)
- Position: Midfielder

Team information
- Current team: Cagliari (on loan from Inter Milan)
- Number: 79

Youth career
- 2007–2009: Moulins
- 2009–2016: Evian Thonon
- 2016–2018: US Annemasse Gaillard
- 2018–2020: Meyrin
- 2020–2021: → FC City (loan)

Senior career*
Years	Team	Apps	(Gls)
2021–2022	Moulins Yzeure	11	(1)
2022–2023	Clermont II	7	(0)
2022–2023	Clermont	6	(0)
2023–2025	Francs Borains	42	(5)
2025–2026	Modena	14	(1)
2026–	Inter Milan	0	(0)
2026	→ Modena (loan)	14	(2)
2026–	→ Cagliari (loan)	1	(0)
- * Club domestic league appearances and goals as of 11 October 2026

Yanis Massolin (born 20 September 2002) is a French professional footballer who plays as a midfielder for Serie A club Cagliari, on loan from Inter Milan.

== Career ==
Massolin is a youth product of the French clubs Moulins, Evian Thonon, and US Annemasse Gaillard, before finishing his youth training at the Swiss club Meyrin. On 10 July 2021, he joined Moulins Yzeure in the Championnat National 2 where he began his senior career.

On 16 June 2022, he transferred to the Ligue 2 side Clermont. He made his professional debut with Clermont as a late substitute in a 3–1 loss to Brest on 23 October 2022.

On 5 September 2023, Massolin joined Francs Borains in the Belgian second-tier Challenger Pro League.

On 2 July 2025, Massolin moved to Modena in Serie B on a three-year contract, with an option for two more years. On 2 February 2026, it was announced that Massolin signed a four-and-a-half-year contract with Serie A club Inter Milan. As part of the agreement, he was loaned back to Modena until the end of the season.

On 31 August 2026, Massolin joined Serie A side Cagliari on a season-long loan.

== Personal life ==
Massolin is the son of the former footballer Richard Massolin, through whom he is of Martiniquais and Spanish descent. He is of Algerian descent though his mother. Massolin wore the number 97 at Clermont in 2022–23 as a nod to his Martiniquais roots, whose regional code is 972.
