= 2008 Bahraini Crown Prince Cup =

2008 Crown Prince Cup
Tournament details
- Host country: Bahrain
- Dates: 26 September – 11 October
- Teams: 4

Final positions
- Champions: Muharraq Club (4th title)

The 2008 Bahraini Crown Prince Cup was the 8th edition of the cup tournament in annual football competition for the cup. This edition featured the top four sides from the Bahraini Premier League 2007-08 season.

== Bracket ==
Semi-finals
2008-09-26 - Manama
(Bahrain) Busaiteen Club	1
(Bahrain) Al-Ahli (Manama)	3
2008-09-28 - Manama
(Bahrain) Muharraq Club	5
Bahrain Riffa Club	2

Final
2008-10-11 - Manama
(Bahrain) Al-Ahli (Manama)	2
(Bahrain) Muharraq Club	5

Source: RSSSF

Bahraini Crown Prince Cup
2008 Winners
Muharraq Club
4th Title
3rd in a row
