= Kittisak Jaihan =

Thai footballer

Personal information
- Full name: Kittisak Jaihan
- Date of birth: 30 December 1979 (age 46)
- Place of birth: Roi Et, Thailand
- Height: 1.71 m (5 ft 7 1/2 in)
- Position: Striker

Team information
- Current team: Chiangrai United
- Number: 13

Senior career*
Years	Team	Apps	(Gls)
2002–2006	Osotsapa		
2007–2008	Pattaya United	34	(9)
2009–present	Chiangrai United	15	(11)
2015	Ubon UMT United		

International career
2006	Thailand	1	(0)
- * Club domestic league appearances and goals as of 22 June 2008

Kittisak Jaihan (Thai กิตติศักดิ์ ใจหาญ) is a Thai footballer. He plays for Thailand Division 2 League clubside Chiangrai United.

He has played for the Thailand national team.
