= Phạm Hải Nam =

Vietnamese footballer

Personal information
- Full name: Phạm Hải Nam
- Date of birth: February 21, 1983 (age 43)
- Place of birth: Mậu Đức commune, Con Cuông, Nghệ An, Vietnam
- Height: 1.70 m (5 ft 7 in)
- Position: Defender

Youth career
- 1995–2001: Sông Lam Nghệ An

Senior career*
Years	Team	Apps	(Gls)
2002–2007	Sông Lam Nghệ An	78	(4)
2007–2011	Hòa Phát Hà Nội	53	(2)
2012–2017	Hà Nội	12	(0)

International career
2003–2008	Vietnam	5	(0)
- * Club domestic league appearances and goals

Phạm Hải Nam (born February 21, 1983) is a Vietnamese footballer who is a defender for Hà Nội.
