= David Adjei =

Ghanaian footballer

Personal information
- Full name: David Adjei
- Date of birth: March 3, 1977 (age 49)
- Place of birth: Accra, Ghana
- Height: 1.72 m (5 ft 7 1/2 in)
- Position: Midfielder

Senior career*
Years	Team	Apps	(Gls)
1995–1996	Corinthians	0	(0)
1996–1997	Atlético Mineiro	2	(1)
1997	Valeriodoce		
1997–2000	Beltinci	45	(7)
1998–1999	→ Triglav Kranj (loan)	14	(2)
2000–2002	Mura	18	(1)
2002–2006	Köflach		
2006–2008	Mahindra United		
2008	Tschantschendorf		
2008	Köflach		
2009–2010	Sturm Klöch	12	(5)

International career
	Ghana U17	12	(0)
- * Club domestic league appearances and goals

David Adjei (born March 3, 1977, in Accra) is a Ghanaian former footballer who played as a midfielder.

== Career ==
He began his career in Brazil playing for Corinthians, Atlético Mineiro and Valeriodoce. He then moved to Europe where he first played in Slovenian Slovenian PrvaLiga clubs Beltinci, Triglav Kranj and Mura and Austrian lower league clubs ASK Köflach and ASV Deutsch Tschantschendorf, after a spell at Indian I-League club Mahindra United where he played between 2006 and 2008. He finished his career with SV Union Sturm Klöch of the Unterliga Süd.

Internationally, Adjei played 12 matches for the Ghana national under-17 football team.

Adjei currently works as a football agent in Slovenia.

== External sources ==
- David Adjei at ÖFB (in German)
- Profile at Ghanaweb
