= Abu Bakar Bah =

Sierra Leonean footballer

Personal information
- Full name: Abu Bakar Bah
- Date of birth: 10 October 1978 (age 48)
- Place of birth: Kenema, Sierra Leone
- Height: 1.70 m (5 ft 7 in)
- Position: Midfielder

Senior career*
Years	Team	Apps	(Gls)
1998–2001	Al-Ahli SC		(4)
2001	Tersana SC		(1)
2001–2002	Al-Ittihad Al-Sakndary	3	(2)
2002–2006	Al Ahed		(13)
2006–2007	Al-Ahli SC		(2)
2007–2010	Racing Beirut		
2011–2012	PSAP Sigli	15	(4)
2013–2014	Lampung FC	26	(11)

International career
2000	Sierra Leone	5	(1)
- * Club domestic league appearances and goals as of 11 July 2012

Abu Bakar Bah (born October 10, 1978) is a Sierra Leonean former professional footballer who plays as a midfielder.

== Honours ==
=== Club honors ===
Al Ahed

- Lebanese FA Cup (2): 2003–04, 2004–05
- Lebanese Federation Cup (2): 2004, 2006
