= Mo'ayyad Abu Keshek =

Jordanian footballer (born 1982)

Personal information
- Full name: Mo'ayyad Omar Suleiman Abu Keshek
- Date of birth: 27 April 1982 (age 44)
- Place of birth: Jordan
- Height: 1.78 m (5 ft 10 in)
- Position: Attacking midfielder

Team information
- Current team: Shabab Al Ubeidiya (head coach)

Youth career
- 1999–2000: Al-Baqa'a

Senior career*
Years	Team	Apps	(Gls)
2000–2006	Al-Baqa'a		
2006–2012	Al-Faisaly		
2011–2012	→ Al-Nasr SC (loan)		
2012	→ Al-Jazeera (loan)		
2012–2013	Jabal Al-Mukaber		(3)
2013–2014	Shabab Al-Ordon		
2014	Fanja SC		
2016–2017	Shabab Al-Khader SC		
2017	Silwan		

International career^{‡}
2002-2003	Jordan U23		
2002–2011	Jordan	43	(1)

Managerial career
- 2021–: Al Faisaly
- * Club domestic league appearances and goals ‡ National team caps and goals as of 8 November 2026

Mo'ayyad Omar Suleiman Abu Keshek is a retired Jordanian footballer who currently coaches Al Faisaly

== Career statistics ==
=== International ===
#	Date	Venue	Opponent	Score	Result	Competition
1	September 19, 2010	Zarqa	Bahrain	2-0	Win	Friendly
