= Richard Massolin =

Footballer (born 1976)

Personal information
- Date of birth: 21 February 1976 (age 50)
- Place of birth: Vitry-sur-Seine, France
- Height: 1.85 m (6 ft 1 in)
- Position: Defender

Youth career
- Yzeure

Senior career*
Years	Team	Apps	(Gls)
2000–2001	Gueugnon	6	(0)
2001–2003	Angoulême	64	(0)
2003–2004	Nîmes	14	(1)
2004–2005	Baulmes	23	(1)
2005–2007	Muharraq Club	16	(0)
2007	Al-Faisaly		(0)
2007–2008	Paris FC	13	(0)
2008–2009	Yzeure	5	(1)
Total		141+	(3)

International career
2004	Martinique	1	(0)
- * Club domestic league appearances and goals

Richard Massolin (born 21 February 1976) is a former professional footballer who played as a defender. Born in France, Massolin played for the Martinique national team.

== International career ==
Massolin represented the Martinique national team once in a 2–0 2005 CONCACAF Gold Cup qualification loss to Cuba on 21 December 2004.

== Personal life ==
Massolin was born in metropolitan France to a Martiniquais father and Spanish mother. He is the father of the French footballer Yanis Massolin.
