= Hassan Nasrallah (footballer) =

Lebanese footballer (born 1982)

Personal information
- Date of birth: 14 October 1982 (age 44)
- Height: 1.88 m (6 ft 2 in)
- Position: Midfielder

Senior career*
Years	Team	Apps	(Gls)
2001–2002	Tadamon Sour		(0)
2002–2003	Mabarra		(0)
2003–2004	Sagesse		(1)
2004–2005	Tadamon Sour		(1)
2005–2008	Ahed		(3)
Total		?	(5)

International career
2004	Lebanon	2	(0)
- * Club domestic league appearances and goals

Hassan Nasrallah (Arabic: حسن نصرالله; born 14 October 1982) is a Lebanese former footballer who played as a midfielder.

== International career ==
Nasrallah played for Lebanon in two games in 2004, a friendly against Syria and at the 2004 WAFF Championship against Iran.

== Honours ==
Ahed

- Lebanese Premier League: 2007–08
- Lebanese Super Cup: 2005, 2008
- Lebanese FA Cup runner-up: 2006–07
