= Rico (footballer) =

Brazilian footballer

Personal information
- Full name: Leandson Dias da Silva
- Date of birth: 4 April 1981 (age 45)
- Place of birth: Recife, Brazil
- Height: 1.73 m (5 ft 8 in)
- Position: Striker

Youth career
- CSA

Senior career*
Years	Team	Apps	(Gls)
2001–2002	CSA		
2002–2003	São Paulo	27	(5)
2003	→ Portuguesa Santista (loan)	7	(5)
2004	Grêmio	22	(2)
2005	Criciúma	0	(0)
2005	Portuguesa Santista	5	(1)
2005–2010	Al-Muharraq	79	(73)
2010–2011	Al-Riffa	12	(7)
2011–2012	Manama		
2012	Hajer	9	(1)
2012	Náutico	4	(1)
2013	América de Natal		
2013	Alecrim		
2014	Vila Nova	3	(0)
2014–2015	Hidd	?	(3)
2015–2016	Busaiteen	?	(3)
2015–2016	Al-Markhiya	7	(6)
2017	Portuguesa	7	(0)
2018	Lagarto	2	(0)
2021	São José de Ribamar	3	(0)
2021	Plácido de Castro	0	(0)
- * Club domestic league appearances and goals

Leandson Dias da Silva (born 4 April 1981), commonly known as Rico, is a Brazilian retired footballer who played as a striker.

== Club career ==
Born in Recife, Rico joined São Paulo Futebol Clube in 2002, and played on the same team as Brazil international and A.C. Milan midfielder Kaká. He also played for Grêmio Foot-Ball Porto-Alegrense. Rico moved to Bahrain to play for Muharraq Club in 2005, and has spent the past five seasons there.

Last season Rico scored many important goals leading Muharraq to the Bahraini premiership. Rico scored in the last second of the match against Sitra by a penalty to secure the league for Muharraq. Rico also helped Muharraq to beat Riffa Club 2–1 in the final of the Crown Prince cup, and helped in Muharraq's run to the AFC Cup 2006 final where they narrowly lost on aggregate against Al Faisaly of Jordan.

In the 2006–07 season, Rico returned with Muharraq. At the beginning of the year he led Muharraq to the Bahraini Super Cup against Al Najma, by scoring a back heel goal to beat Bahrain international goalkeeper Abdulrahman AbdulKarim. He scored 25 goals in 21 games in the Bahraini league helping Muharraq to the championship. In 2008, he scored 19 goals in 11 games granting him the title of IFFHS World's Top Goal Scorer.

Rico transferred to Bahrain Riffa Club in May 2010, and in September 2011 he transferred to Manama.
