= Siraj Al-Tall =

Jordanian footballer

Siraj Al-Tall سراج التل
Personal information
- Full name: Siraj Ahmed Yusuf Saleh Al-Tall
- Date of birth: 8 January 1982 (age 44)
- Place of birth: Dubai, United Arab Emirates
- Height: 1.85 m (6 ft 1 in)
- Position: Striker

Senior career*
Years	Team	Apps	(Gls)
1998–2008	Al-Faisaly (Amman)		
2008	→ Sydney Olympic (loan)	10	(4)
2009	→ Pelita Jaya (loan)	11	(0)

International career
2005–2007	Jordan	9	(1)
- * Club domestic league appearances and goals

Siraj Ahmed Yusuf Saleh Al-Tall (Arabic: سراج احمد يوسف صالح التل) (born 8 January 1982 in the United Arab Emirates) is a retired Jordanian footballer who last played for Pelita Jaya.

== Career ==
Al-Tall joined the Jordanian club Al-Faisaly as a teenager in 1999 and has been playing for it until 2008, when he joined Sydney Olympic, in the Australian NSW Premier League. Initially he was not given clearance by the Jordan FA to play for his new club, as they claimed that he had an outstanding contract with his previous club. Siraj maintained that no such contract existed. Sydney Olympic went to FIFA to resolve the situation, and FIFA ruled in favour of Sydney Olympic on 1 May 2008. In 2009, he joined Pelita Jaya in the top flight of Indonesian football, Indonesian Super League.

== International career ==
He was a member of the Jordan national football team. The last time he featured for his country was against Kyrgyzstan in October 2007.

== International goals ==
#	Date	Venue	Opponent	Score	Result	Competition
1	September 2, 2006	Manama	Bahrain	2-0	Win	Friendly
