= Abdel-Hadi Al-Maharmeh =

Jordanian footballer (born 1983)

Personal information
- Full name: Abdel-Hadi Mohammad Al-Maharmeh
- Date of birth: September 15, 1983 (age 43)
- Place of birth: Sahab, Jordan
- Height: 1.72 m (5 ft 8 in)
- Position: Striker

Youth career
- 1998–2000: Sahab

Senior career*
Years	Team	Apps	(Gls)
2000–2013	Al-Faisaly		
2013	Saham		
2013–2014	Shabab Al-Ordon		
2014	Al-Tai		
2014–2015	Al-Jazeera		
2015–2016	Sahab		
2016	Al-Asalah		
2016	Sahab		
2016-2017	Al-Salt		
2017-2019	Al-Wihdeh		

International career^{‡}
2002-2003	Jordan U23		
2002–2009	Jordan	25	(5)
- * Club domestic league appearances and goals as of Jan 11, 2017 ‡ National team caps and goals as of Jan 15, 2018

Abdel-Hadi Mohammad Al-Maharmeh is a retired Jordanian footballer.

== Honors and Participation in International Tournaments ==
=== In WAFF Championships ===
- 2004 WAFF Championship

== International goals ==
#	Date	Venue	Opponent	Score	Result	Competition
1	October 8, 2004	Bangkok	Thailand	3-2	Win	Friendly
2	October 8, 2004	Bangkok	Thailand	3-2	Win	Friendly
3	October 13, 2004	Vientiane	Laos	3-2	Win	2006 FIFA World Cup qualification
4	October 20, 2004	Tripoli	Ecuador	3-0	Win	Friendly
5	November 10, 2006	Lahore	Pakistan	3-0	Win	2007 AFC Asian Cup qualification
