= 2020–21 Maryland Bobcats FC season =

American soccer team season

Maryland Bobcats FC
2020–21 NISA season
- President: Jay Saba
- Head coach: Samuel Okpodu
- Stadium: Maryland SoccerPlex; Germantown, Maryland
- NISA: Fall: Did not compete Spring: 5th
- Playoffs: Fall: Did not compete Spring: Did not qualify
- Legends Cup: 7th place
- U.S. Open Cup: Did not qualify
- Top goalscorer: League: James Sesay: 5 All: James Sesay: 6
- Biggest win: MSFC 1–3 MBFC (June 19); MBFC 3–1 1904 (June 26)
- Biggest defeat: MBFC 0–2 LAF (May 15)

The 2020–21 Maryland Bobcats FC season was the club's first in the National Independent Soccer Association and first as a professional team.

== Overview ==
Following an application in late July 2020, Maryland Bobcats FC was admitted into the National Independent Soccer Association on October 13, 2020. The team had previously been members in leagues such as the United Premier Soccer League, where it went undefeated and won a national championship in fall 2019, and the National Premier Soccer League. Prior to officially joining NISA, Maryland competed in the inaugural NISA Independent Cup as a member of the NPSL and took part as a member of the Mid-Atlantic Region. Additionally, the team played a friendly against NISA member Chattanooga FC following the conclusion of the fall 2019 season.

On August 14, 2020 Maryland also joined in the Eastern Premier Soccer League, an amateur league affiliate of NISA, and began fielding a reserve team in it in spring 2021.

On March 24, 2021, former Nigeria women's national football team manager Samuel Okpodu was named head coach for 2021.

== Roster ==
=== Players ===
As of May 22, 2021

No.	Position	Player	Nation
1	GK	NGA	Joel Isyaq
2	DF	USA	Philip Blystone
3	DF	USA	Morian Moussi
4	DF	ENG	Dylan Ogletree
5	DF	USA	Javon Dawkins
6	MF	TOG	Pilawe Patrick Pato
7	DF	USA	Medo Wilfred
8	MF	ETH	Sammy Kahsai
9	FW	USA	Tunde Akinlosotu
10	FW	USA	Kay Banjo
11	MF	USA	Bryce Orsini
12	MF	SLV	Bryan Argueta
13	MF	USA	Emilio Torres
14	FW	LBR	Elton Joe
15	DF	USA	Richard Forka
16	DF	USA	Davey Mason
17	FW	USA	Adam Yingling
18	MF	NGA	Kingsley Onwuka
19	DF	HON	Luis Galo Osorio
20	MF	PAN	Eduardo Jiménez
21	MF	CIV	Yaya Fane
22	MF	FRA	Alex Kao
23	FW	CIV	Levi Houapeu
24	MF	USA	Andy Alvarado
25	DF	USA	Jake Dengler
26	MF	USA	Josselin Possian
27	FW	USA	Khalid Balogun
28	GK	USA	Daniel Olofinsua
29	MF	CMR	Samuel Edoung-Biyo
30	GK	SLE	Christian Caulker
47	FW	USA	Taylor Gray
77	MF	USA	Nico Brown
94	DF	USA	Trey Cooper
99	FW	SLE	James 'Pele' Sesay

=== Staff ===
Technical staff
Head Coach	(Nigeria) Samuel Okpodu

== Transfers ==
=== In ===
#	Pos.	Player	Signed from	Details	Date	Source
10	FW	(United States) Kay Banjo	(United States) Maryland Bobcats FC (UPSL)	Free transfer	February 1, 2021	
15	DF	(United States) Richard Forka	(United States) Maryland Bobcats FC (UPSL)	Free transfer	February 2, 2021	
14	FW	(Liberia) Elton Joe	(United States) Maryland Bobcats FC (UPSL)	Free transfer	February 3, 2021	
9	FW	(United States) Tunde Akinlosotu	(United States) FC Baltimore Christos	Free transfer	February 4, 2021	
16	DF	(United States) Davey Mason	(United States) Loyola Greyhounds	Free transfer	February 5, 2021	
23	MF/FW	(Ivory Coast) Levi Houapeu	(United States) Maryland Bobcats FC (UPSL)	Free transfer	February 8, 2021	
11	MF/FW	(United States) Bryce Orsini	(England) Wakefield A.F.C.	Free transfer	February 9, 2021	
6	MF	(Togo) Patrick Pato	(United States) Maryland Bobcats FC (UPSL)	Free transfer	February 10, 2021	
2	DF	(United States) Philip Blystone	(United States) Maryland Bobcats FC (UPSL)	Free transfer	February 11, 2021	
20	FW	(Panama) Eduardo Jiménez	(United States) Maryland Bobcats FC (UPSL)	Free transfer	February 12, 2021	
22	MF	(France) Alex Kao	(United States) Maryland Bobcats FC (UPSL)	Free transfer	February 15, 2021	
8	MF	(Ethiopia) Sammy Kahsai	(United States) Maryland Bobcats FC (UPSL)	Free transfer	February 16, 2021	
94	DF	(Spain) Trey Cooper	(United States) Maryland Bobcats FC (UPSL)	Free transfer	February 17, 2021	
30	GK	(Sierra Leone) Christian Caulker	(United States) Maryland Bobcats FC (UPSL)	Free transfer	February 18, 2021	
1	GK	(Nigeria) Joel Isyaq	(United States) Maryland Bobcats FC (UPSL)	Free transfer	February 19, 2021	
29	MF	(Cameroon) Samuel Edoung-Biyo	(United States) Maryland Bobcats FC (UPSL)	Free transfer	February 22, 2021	
77	FW	(United States) Nico Brown	(United States) Loyola Greyhounds	Free transfer	February 22, 2021	
99	MF	(Sierra Leone) James 'Pele' Sesay	(United States) NTX Rayados	Free transfer	February 23, 2021	
12	MF	(El Salvador) Bryan Argueta	(United States) Germantown City FC	Free transfer	February 24, 2021	
18	DF	(Nigeria) Kingsley Onwuka	(United States) Maryland Bobcats FC (UPSL)	Free transfer	February 24, 2021	
19	DF	(Honduras) Luis Galo Osorio	(Chinese Taipei) Tatung F.C.	Free transfer	February 25, 2021	
7	DF	(United States) Medo Wilfred	(Nigeria) Vandrezzer FC	Free transfer	February 25, 2021	
5	DF	(United States) Javon Dawkins	(United States) Maryland Bobcats FC (UPSL)	Free transfer	February 26, 2021	
24	MF	(United States) Andy Alvarado	(United States) Maryland Bobcats FC (UPSL)	Free transfer	February 26, 2021	
3	DF	(United States) Morian Moussi	(United States) Maryland Bobcats FC (UPSL)	Free transfer	February 27, 2021	
4	DF	(England) Dylan Ogletree	(El Salvador) C.D. Fuerte San Francisco	Free transfer	February 27, 2021	
28	GK	(United States) Daniel Olofinsua	(United States) Maryland Bobcats FC (UPSL)	Free transfer	March 1, 2021	
13	MF	(United States) Emilio Torres	(United States) Maryland Bobcats FC (UPSL)	Free transfer	March 1, 2021	
17	FW	(United States) Adam Yingling	(United States) Ohio Wesleyan Battling Bishops	Free transfer	March 17, 2021	
26	MF	(United States) Josselin Possian	(Germany) SV Darmstadt 98	Free transfer	March 19, 2021	
21	MF	(Ivory Coast) Yaya Fane	(United States) Philadelphia Lone Star FC	Free transfer	April 8, 2021	
25	DF	(United States) Jake Dengler	(United States) Loudoun United FC	Free transfer	May 11, 2021	
27	FW	(United States) Khalid Balogun	(United States) FC Baltimore Christos	Free transfer	May 26, 2021	
47	FW	(United States) Taylor Gray	(United States) Maryland Bobcats FC II	Free transfer	May 27, 2021	

== Friendlies ==
September 26, 2020 Friendly	Maryland Bobcats FC	1–3	Philadelphia Lone Star FC	Columbia, Maryland
7:30 p.m. EDT		Broadcast		Stadium: Cedar Lane Park

October 24, 2020 Friendly	Chattanooga FC	0–1	Maryland Bobcats FC	Chattanooga, Tennessee
7:30 p.m. EDT	Spielman (yellow card) 38'	Broadcast	Forka (yellow card) 16'; Kao 19', (yellow card) 28'; Banjo (yellow card) 38'; Moussi (yellow card) 46'; Jawara (yellow card) 61'; Isyaq (yellow card) 90+1'	Stadium: Finley Stadium

March 20, 2021 Friendly	Maryland Bobcats FC	1–2	All Stars United FC (EPSL)	Silver Spring, Maryland
4:00 p.m. EDT	Forka 80'	Report	(pen.)	Stadium: Montgomery Blair High School; Attendance: 0
Note: Game was played behind closed doors

== Competitions ==
=== NISA Independent Cup ===
Prior to joining NISA, the Bobcats were announced as one of the 11 non-association teams taking part in the inaugural NISA Independent Cup on July 1. The regional tournament acted as both a pre-season and chance to "provide a platform for professional and amateur independent clubs to play together on a national stage."

Maryland was drawn into the Mid-Atlantic Region alongside the New York Cosmos, NISA expansion side New Amsterdam FC, and fellow NPSL side FC Baltimore Christos.

On July 24, NISA announced that the Mid-Atlantic Region tournament was postponed due to a surge of COVID-19 cases in Maryland and the subsequent closing of the Maryland SoccerPlex to professional sports. On July 28, NISA announced a majority of the region's games would be played at Evergreen Sportsplex in Leesburg, Virginia. Following a weather postponement that forced the Bobcat's final game to be played at a neutral site, the team won the Mid-Atlantic Region title on October 10 when the Cosmos and FC Baltimore played to a 2–2 draw allowing Maryland to finish atop the table via goal differential.

==== Standings ====
Pos	Team	Pld	W	D	L	GF	GA	GD	Pts
1	Maryland Bobcats FC (C)	3	1	2	0	9	3	+6	5
2	FC Baltimore Christos	3	1	2	0	6	3	+3	5
3	New York Cosmos	3	0	3	0	4	4	0	3
4	New Amsterdam FC	3	0	1	2	2	11	−9	1

Source: nisaofficial.com
Rules for classification: 1) points; 2) head to head; 3) goal differential.
(C) Champions

==== Matches ====
August 2, 2020 Match 1	FC Baltimore Christos	1–1	Maryland Bobcats FC	Leesburg, Virginia
8:45 p.m. EDT	Akinlosotu 28'	Broadcast	Kahsai (yellow card) 25'; Forka (yellow card) 38'; Banjo 84' (pen.)	Stadium: Evergreen Sportsplex; Attendance: 0
Note: Game was played behind closed doors due to the COVID-19 pandemic

August 6, 2020 Match 2	New Amsterdam FC	P–P	Maryland Bobcats FC	Leesburg, Virginia
6:45 p.m. EDT				Stadium: Evergreen Sportsplex; Attendance: 0
Note: Called off due to weather

August 9, 2020 Match 3	Maryland Bobcats FC	1–1	New York Cosmos	Leesburg, Virginia
7:45 p.m. EDT	Cauker (red card) 9'; Iosausu (yellow card) 61'; Forka 76'	Report; Broadcast	Acuña 19'; Candela (yellow card) 45'; Agolli (yellow card) 62'; Tenjo (yellow card) 71'	Stadium: Evergreen Sportsplex; Attendance: 0
Note: Game was played behind closed doors due to the COVID-19 pandemic

August 23, 2020 Match 2 (Replay)	New Amsterdam FC	1–7	Maryland Bobcats FC	Wayne, Pennsylvania
2:00 p.m. EDT	McKenzie 5'	Report	Onwuka 35'; Joe 47'; Banjo 61', 70' (pen.); Pato 64'; Torres 66', 76'	Stadium: YSC Sports Complex; Attendance: 0
Note: Game was played behind closed doors due to the COVID-19 pandemic

=== 2020 Fall Season ===
Initial details for the NISA Fall 2020 season were released on June 4, 2020. Maryland did not take part in the fall in an official capacity.

=== 2021 Spring Season ===
==== NISA Legends Cup ====
NISA announced initial spring season plans in early February 2021, including starting the season with a tournament in Chattanooga, Tennessee with a standard regular season to follow. The tournament, now called the NISA Legends Cup, was officially announced on March 10 and is scheduled to run between April 13 and 25. All nine NISA members teams taking part in the Spring were divided into three team groups and played a round robin schedule. The highest placing group winner automatically qualified for the tournament final, while the second and third highest finishing teams overall played one-another in a semifinal to determine a second finalist.

The Bobcats were drawn into Group 1 alongside Michigan Stars FC and the returning San Diego 1904 FC.

===== Standings =====
Pos	Team	Pld	W	D	L	GF	GA	GD	Pts	Qualification
1	Chattanooga FC	2	2	0	0	7	1	+6	6	Advance to Legends Cup final
2	Detroit City FC	2	1	1	0	2	0	+2	4	Advance to Legends Cup semifinal
3	San Diego 1904 FC	2	1	1	0	3	2	+1	4	Advance to Legends Cup semifinal
4	Los Angeles Force	2	1	0	1	4	6	−2	3	
5	Michigan Stars FC	2	0	2	0	2	2	0	2	
6	California United Strikers FC	2	0	2	0	1	1	0	2	
7	Maryland Bobcats FC	2	0	1	1	2	3	−1	1	
8	Stumptown AC	2	0	1	1	1	3	−2	1	
9	New Amsterdam FC	2	0	0	2	2	6	−4	0	

Source: nisasoccer.com
Rules for classification: 1) points; 2) goal differential; 3) goals scored; 4) head to head; 5) goals allowed; 6) coin toss

===== Group 1 results =====
Home \ Away	MAR	MIC	SDG
Maryland Bobcats FC	—	1–1	1–2
Michigan Stars FC		—	1–1
San Diego 1904 FC			—

Source: nisasoccer.com
Legend: Blue = home team win; Yellow = draw; Red = away team win.

===== Matches =====
April 16, 2021 Group 1 Round 1	Maryland Bobcats FC	1–2	San Diego 1904 FC	Chattanooga, Tennessee
5:00 p.m. EDT	Argueta (yellow card) 20', (goal) 61'; Akinlosotu (yellow card) 28'; Mason (yellow card) 39'; Sesay (yellow card) 42' (yellow-red card) 90+1'; Caulker (yellow card) 80' (yellow-red card) 82'	Report; Broadcast	Romero 13', 14'; Lomeli (yellow card) 30'; Arreola (yellow card) 68'	Stadium: Finley Stadium; Referee: Ben Meyer

April 19, 2021 Group 1 Round 2	Michigan Stars FC	1–1	Maryland Bobcats FC	Chattanooga, Tennessee
8:00 p.m. EDT	Aidoo (yellow card) 41', (goal) 79'; Nuel (yellow card) 52'; Majano (yellow card) 83'; Mkuruva (yellow card) 83'	Report; Broadcast (Non U.S.)	Fane (yellow card) 20'; Banjo 85' (pen.)	Stadium: Finley Stadium

April 22, 2021	#6 California United Strikers FC	3–2	#7 Maryland Bobcats FC	Chattanooga, Tennessee
2:00 p.m. EDT	Araneda 1'; Hogbin 9'; Bryant 14'; Fuerte (yellow card) 83' (yellow-red card) 90+2'	Report; Broadcast	Brown (yellow card) 30', (goal) 51'; Sesay 68'; Fane (yellow card) 69'; Dawkins (yellow card) 81'	Stadium: Finley Stadium

==== Regular season ====
The Spring Season schedule was announced on March 18 with each association member playing eight games, four home and four away, in a single round-robin format.

===== Standings =====
Pos	Team	Pld	W	D	L	GF	GA	GD	Pts	Qualification
1	Detroit City FC (Y, X)	8	6	2	0	14	3	+11	20	Advance to season final
2	Los Angeles Force	8	6	0	2	11	6	+5	18	Advance to spring final (Note: If either 2020 Fall Champion Detroit or 2021 Legends Cup runner-up Chattanooga finish the spring season in first place, or both teams finish in the top two, the spot in the spring final will go to the next best team.)
3	Stumptown AC	8	4	3	1	8	4	+4	15	
4	California United Strikers FC	8	4	1	3	12	10	+2	13	
5	Maryland Bobcats FC	8	3	2	3	9	8	+1	11	
6	Chattanooga FC (Z)	8	2	2	4	6	8	−2	8	Advance to spring final
7	San Diego 1904 FC	8	2	1	5	8	17	−9	7	
8	Michigan Stars FC	8	1	2	5	5	12	−7	5	
9	New Amsterdam FC	8	1	1	6	5	10	−5	4	

Source: nisasoccer.com
Rules for classification: 1) points; 2) goal differential; 3) goals scored; 4) head to head; 5) goals allowed; 6) coin toss
(X) Spring Legends Cup champion; (Y) Fall Champion, qualifies for season final; (Z) Spring Legends Cup runner-up, qualifies for spring final

===== Results summary =====
Overall								Home						Away					
Pld	W	D	L	GF	GA	GD	Pts	W	D	L	GF	GA	GD	W	D	L	GF	GA	GD
8	3	2	3	9	8	+1	11	2	0	2	6	6	0	1	2	1	3	2	+1

Last updated: June 26, 2021.
Source: Match reports

===== Matches =====
May 1, 2021 Week 1	Detroit City FC	1–0	Maryland Bobcats FC	Hamtramck, Michigan
7:30 p.m. EDT	Manning 90+2'	Report; DCFC Report; Broadcast	Brown (yellow card) 26'; Dawkins (yellow card) 59'	Stadium: Keyworth Stadium; Attendance: 1,530; Referee: Brandon Gardner
Note: Dawkins yellow card missing from report, shown on stream (though mislabeled and incorrectly reported to have happened in the 90+6 minute)

May 8, 2021 Week 2	Maryland Bobcats FC	1–2	Stumptown AC	Germantown, Maryland
7:30 p.m. EDT	Cooper (yellow card) 30'; Kao (yellow card) 47'; Fane (yellow card) 60'; Banjo 76' (pen.)	Report; Broadcast	McGrath 24'; Ward (yellow card) 56', (goal) 65'; Bejarno (yellow card) 75'	Stadium: Maryland SoccerPlex; Referee: Gustavo Solorio
Note: Fane yellow not in report but shown on broadcast (though not marked)

May 15, 2021 Week 3	Maryland Bobcats FC	0–2	Los Angeles Force	Germantown, Maryland
7:30 p.m. EDT	Cooper (yellow card) 52' (yellow-red card) 81'; Dengler (yellow card) 71'	Report; Broadcast	Villon (yellow card) 1'; Chaney 53', 70'; Alvarado (yellow card) 59'; Kashani (yellow card) 74'	Stadium: Maryland SoccerPlex
Note: Dengler's card missing in report but shown on broadcast

May 29, 2021 Week 4	Chattanooga FC	0–0	Maryland Bobcats FC	Chattanooga, Tennessee
7:30 p.m. EDT		NISA Report; CFC Report; Broadcast	Fane (yellow card) 35'; Possian (yellow card) 65'	Stadium: Finley Stadium; Attendance: 3,231; Referee: Carlos Pielago
Note: Samuel Kahsai incorrectly listed as receiving a yellow and broadcast clarified it was Yaya Fane, report missing Ian McGrath entering for Brett Jones in 16th minute (lists Jones leaving)

June 5, 2021 Week 5	Maryland Bobcats FC	2–1	California United Strikers FC	Germantown, Maryland
7:30 p.m. EDT	Sesay 8', 33', (yellow card) 79'; Dawkins (yellow card) 41'; Kao (yellow card) 65'	Report; Broadcast	Thierjung 32'; Araneda (yellow card) 76' (yellow-red card) 85'	Stadium: Maryland SoccerPlex
Note: Match report missing Yaya Fane entering the match in the 75th minute for Taylor Gray

June 11, 2021 Week 6	New Amsterdam FC	0–0	Maryland Bobcats FC	Warwick, New York
4:00 p.m. EDT	Malango (yellow card) 44'; John-Brown (yellow card) 68'	Report; Broadcast	Brown (yellow card) 54'; Gray (yellow card) 62'; Sesay (yellow card) 84'; Argueta (yellow card) 90+6'	Stadium: Hudson Sports Complex; Referee: José Martín Arana
Note: Maryland's Andy Alvarado may have been carded in the 84/85th minute for a dangerous challenge but it cannot be confirmed

June 19, 2021 Week 7	Michigan Stars FC	1–3	Maryland Bobcats FC	Washington, Michigan
7:00 p.m. EDT	Nuel 90' (pen.)	Report; Broadcast	Argueta 68'; Sesay 70', 80'	Stadium: Michigan Stars Sport Center

June 26, 2021 Week 8	Maryland Bobcats FC	3–1	San Diego 1904 FC	Germantown, Maryland
7:30 p.m. EDT	Banjo 20'; Argueta (yellow card) 69'; Balogun 71'; Sesay 90'	NISA Report; FotMob Report; Match Recording	Gourdie (yellow card) 46'; Romero (yellow card) 70', (goal) 85'; Espinoza (yellow card) 89'	Stadium: Maryland SoccerPlex; Referee: Balvir Cabrera Garcia
Note: Match was not streamed due to technical issue and the match report only shows the starting lineups. Further detail was gathered from team social media and a match recording provided by Maryland. 1904 Subs (63' Lomeli in for Almubaslat, 75' Ramirez Jr in for Esquivel), MBFC Subs (56' Pato in for Alvarado, 79' Mason in for Balogun / Gray in for Kao / Kahsai in for Banjo, 85' Blystone in for Dawkins). Additionally, match report incorrectly lists Marson as starting GK for 1904 when it was actually Sarmiento.

=== U.S. Open Cup ===
As a team playing in a recognized professional league, Maryland would normally be automatically qualified for the U.S. Open Cup. However, with the 2021 edition shorted due to the COVID-19 pandemic, NISA has only been allotted 1 to 2 teams spots. On March 29, U.S. Soccer announced 2020 Fall Champion Detroit City FC as NISA's representative in the tournament.

== Squad statistics ==
As of Match played June 19, 2021

=== Appearances and goals ===
No.	Pos	Nat	Player	Total		Legends Cup		Spring Season	
No.	Pos	Nat	Player	Apps	Goals	Apps	Goals	Apps	Goals
Goalkeepers
1	GK	(Nigeria) NGA	Joel Isyaq	4	0	1+0	0	3+0	0
28	GK	(United States) USA	Daniel Olofinsua	1	0	1+0	0	0+0	0
30	GK	(Sierra Leone) SLE	Christian Caulker	7	0	1+0	0	5+1	0
Defenders
2	DF	(United States) USA	Philip Blystone	1	0	0+0	0	0+1	0
3	DF	(United States) USA	Morian Moussi	7	0	0+0	0	5+2	0
4	DF	(England) ENG	Dylan Ogletree	1	0	0+0	0	1+0	0
5	DF	(United States) USA	Javon Dawkins	11	0	2+1	0	6+2	0
7	DF	(United States) USA	Medo Wilfred	1	0	1+0	0	0+0	0
15	DF	(United States) USA	Richard Forka	2	0	1+0	0	1+0	0
16	DF	(United States) USA	Davey Mason	6	0	2+0	0	3+1	0
19	DF	(Honduras) HON	Luis Galo Osorio	1	0	1+0	0	0+0	0
25	DF	(United States) USA	Jake Dengler	6	0	0+0	0	6+0	0
94	DF	(United States) USA	Trey Cooper	6	0	2+0	0	3+1	0
Midfielders
6	MF	(Togo) TOG	Pilawe Patrick Pato	8	0	1+1	0	3+3	0
8	MF	(Ethiopia) ETH	Sammy Kahsai	5	0	1+2	0	1+1	0
11	MF	(United States) USA	Bryce Orsini	5	0	0+2	0	0+3	0
12	MF	(El Salvador) SLV	Bryan Argueta	11	2	2+1	1	8+0	1
13	MF	(United States) USA	Emilio Torres	2	0	0+1	0	0+1	0
18	MF	(Nigeria) NGA	Kingsley Onwuka	0	0	0+0	0	0+0	0
20	MF	(Panama) PAN	Eduardo Jiménez	3	0	0+0	0	0+3	0
21	MF	(Ivory Coast) CIV	Yaya Fane	8	0	3+0	0	4+1	0
22	MF	(France) FRA	Alex Kao	10	0	2+1	0	7+0	0
24	MF	(United States) USA	Andy Alvarado	3	0	0+0	0	1+2	0
26	MF	(United States) USA	Josselin Possian	11	0	2+1	0	8+0	0
29	MF	(Cameroon) CMR	Samuel Edoung-Biyo	0	0	0+0	0	0+0	0
77	MF	(United States) USA	Nico Brown	8	1	3+0	1	3+2	0
Forwards
9	FW	(United States) USA	Tunde Akinlosotu	6	0	2+0	0	2+2	0
10	FW	(United States) USA	Kay Banjo	6	3	2+0	1	4+0	2
14	FW	(Liberia) LBR	Elton Joe	2	0	1+1	0	0+0	0
17	FW	(United States) USA	Adam Yingling	4	0	0+1	0	2+1	0
23	FW	(Ivory Coast) CIV	Levi Houapeu	0	0	0+0	0	0+0	0
27	FW	(United States) USA	Khalid Balogun	3	1	0+0	0	3+0	1
47	FW	(United States) USA	Taylor Gray	5	0	0+0	0	2+3	0
99	FW	(Sierra Leone) SLE	James 'Pele' Sesay	10	6	2+0	1	7+1	5
Left during season

=== Goal scorers ===
Place	Position	Nation	Number	Name	Legends Cup	Spring Season	Total
1	FW	(Sierra Leone)	99	James 'Pele' Sesay	1	5	6
2	FW	(United States)	10	Kay Banjo	1	2	3
3	MF	(United States)	12	Bryan Argueta	1	1	2
4	MF	(United States)	27	Khalid Balogun	0	1	1
4	MF	(United States)	77	Nico Brown	1	0	1

=== Disciplinary record ===
Number	Nation	Position	Name	Legends Cup		Spring Season		Total	
Number	Nation	Position	Name	Booked	Sent off (straight red)	Booked	Sent off (straight red)	Booked	Sent off (straight red)
5	(United States)	DF	Javon Dawkins	1	0	2	0	3	0
9	(United States)	FW	Tunde Akinlosotu	1	0	0	0	1	0
12	(El Salvador)	MF	Bryan Argueta	1	0	2	0	3	0
16	(United States)	DF	Davey Mason	1	0	0	0	1	0
21	(Ivory Coast)	MF	Yaya Fane	2	0	2	0	4	0
22	(France)	MF	Alex Kao	0	0	2	0	2	0
25	(United States)	DF	Jake Dengler	0	0	1	0	1	0
26	(United States)	MF	Josselin Possian	0	0	1	0	1	0
30	(Sierra Leone)	GK	Christian Caulker	2	1	0	0	2	1
47	(United States)	FW	Taylor Gray	0	0	1	0	1	0
77	(United States)	MF	Nico Brown	1	0	2	0	3	0
94	(United States)	DF	Trey Cooper	0	0	3	1	3	1
99	(Sierra Leone)	FW	James 'Pele' Sesay	2	1	2	0	4	1
