= Match fixing in association football =

The issue of match fixing in association football has been described in 2013 by Chris Eaton, the former Head of Security of FIFA (the sport's world governing body), as a "crisis", while UEFA's president Michel Platini has said that if it continues, "football is dead". Zhang Jilong, president of the Asian Football Confederation, has stated that it is a "pandemic". The issue also affects a number of other sports across the world. In May 2011, world governing body FIFA announced an anti-match fixing plan, and in September 2012 FIFA President Sepp Blatter warned that match-fixing endangered "the integrity of the game". In September 2014, the Council of Europe also announced they would tackle the problem.

A number of clubs in countries across the world have been subject to match fixing, including Australia, China, and Spain. The South African national team has also been investigated. In the 18 months prior to February 2013, Europol investigated 680 matches in 30 countries. In November 2013, 11 men were charged in Estonia with fixing 17 matches. The problem is often attributed to criminal gangs based in Asia, who generate "hundreds of billions of euros per year". Players who have publicly rejected bribes have been praised, such as in a case in Belize. Sportradar Integrity Services identified 721 suspicious soccer matches in 72 countries in 2024 and 881 matches in 83 countries in 2023. Suspicious activity mostly occurred in live betting and primarily involved suspected manipulations of the winning goal margin or total goals in a march.

== Algeria ==
In September 2018, the BBC reported on match fixing in Algerian football.

== Azerbaijan ==
On 30 November 2017, Keshla FK confirmed that they had terminated the contracts of Nizami Hajiyev and Mirhüseyn Seyidov due to suspicion of match manipulating, with both also being arrested. The following day, 1 December 2017, both Hajiyev and Seyidov were banned from all footballing activities by the AFFA. In December 2019, Jamshid Maharramov was arrested in relation to match-fixing allegations that saw him banned from football by the AFFA in 2017.

== Bangladesh ==
On 29 August 2021, Arambagh KS were found guilty of spot-fixing, match manipulations and live and online betting. The Bangladesh Football Federation disciplinary committee fined 5 lakhs BDT and banned Arambagh from entering the second-tier, the Bangladesh Championship League for two years. The club would have to enter domestic football again through the third-tier, the Dhaka Senior Division Football League.

== Belgium ==
In October 2018, 14 people, including two referees, were arrested and charged with bribery involving two Belgian Pro League relegation battles in a match-fixing investigation.

== Benin ==
In April 2019, ex-Benin international Séïdath Tchomogo was one of four African former international footballers banned for life by FIFA due to "match manipulation".

== Brazil ==
A 2023 Brazilian football match-fixing scandal occurred in the Brasileirão Série B league. In October 2024, the Parliamentary Inquiry Commission (CPI) on Sports Betting requested the Brazilian Football Confederation to conduct an investigation into reports of suspicious incidents during Brasileirão Série A matches. Sportradar Integrity Services identified 57 suspicious matches in Brazil in 2024, down from 110 in 2023. In 2026, four individuals, including two players, were sentenced to 7 to 13 years in prison for match fixing at a club in the Campeonato Brasiliense league of Brazil’s Federal District. The Brazilian Senate held a hearing, led by senator and former footballer Romário, on the case.

== Canada ==
The Canadian Soccer League (CSL) is an unsanctioned semi-professional league in Canada, formerly sanctioned by the Canadian Soccer Association (CSA). Despite its name, the CSL is not a national league as the teams are located solely in Southern Ontario. On 12 September 2012, the Canadian Broadcasting Corporation reported that a CSL game held in September 2009 was fixed. On 31 January 2013, the CSA announced it was decertifying the league. Following the 2013 announcement, the Canadian MLS teams Toronto FC and Montreal Impact both withdrew their academy teams, Toronto FC Academy and Montreal Impact Academy from participation in the CSL. The CSL continued to operate after decertification by the CSA. The International Centre for Sport Security (ICSS) later reported that 42% of matches in the "rogue league's" 2015 season showed signs of suspicious betting activity. In 2016, the Royal Canadian Mounted Police opened investigations in the alleged CSL match fixing.

== China ==
The "Five Jia B Rats incident" was a series of match fixing incidents that involved five football teams in the final rounds of the 2001 second-tier Jia B League (present day China League One). Referee Gong Jianping served 18 months in prison before dying of leukemia. From 2009 to 2011, a large-scale 2009–2013 investigation by the Ministry of Public Security of China revealed many match-fixing scandals that occurred mainly between 2003 and 2009 in Chinese top-two tier leagues. As a result, Shanghai Shenhua was stripped of their 2003 top-tier league title. Former vice presidents of Chinese Football Association Xie Yalong, Nan Yong and Yang Yimin were sentenced to 10.5 years in jail. FIFA World Cup referee Lu Jun, and China national football team players Shen Si, Jiang Jin, Qi Hong, Li Ming, were sentenced to 5.5 years or 6 years in jail. In December 2024, Li Tie was jailed for match fixing and bribery.

== El Salvador ==
On 20 September 2013, the Salvadoran Football Federation banned 14 Salvadoran players for life, and three other players for shorter periods, due to their involvement with match fixing while playing with the El Salvador national football team at various matches during the period 2010–2012. Those banned for life were Dennis Alas, Luis Anaya, Darwin Bonilla, Cristian Castillo, Ramón Flores, Marvin González, Miguel Granada, José Henríquez, Reynaldo Hernández, Miguel Montes, Alfredo Pacheco, Dagoberto Portillo, Osael Romero, Ramón Sánchez and Miguel Montes.

The match fixers included some of El Salvador's most noted players. Sánchez had served as the team captain at the 2009 CONCACAF Gold Cup. González had been captain at the 2011 CONCACAF Gold Cup, when he and seven other of these players fixed the result in a 5–0 loss to the Mexico national football team. At the time of the ban, Pacheco held the record for most appearances on the El Salvador national football team; he was murdered in 2015 when leaving a bathroom at a gas station in Santa Ana, El Salvador. Castillo (D.C. United) and Romero (Chivas USA) had both played in Major League Soccer.

== England ==
Six people, including three current players and ex-player Delroy Facey, were arrested in November 2013 on suspicion of match fixing. Two Singaporean men were later charged, while two non-league footballers for Whitehawk were also charged in December 2013. As a result of this investigation, three people were jailed in June 2014. Later that month, professional footballer Sam Sodje was investigated after he was filmed by an undercover journalist claiming to have fixed matches; a total of six people were arrested, including active player DJ Campbell. Campbell was later cleared of all allegations. Cristian Montaño was also named as one of those arrested, and he was later sacked by club Oldham Athletic. Montaño later denied the accusations. In March 2014 the six players were re-arrested, alongside seven new players, all based in North-West England. The seven new players arrested were later named as John Welsh, Keith Keane, Bailey Wright, David Buchanan, Ben Davies and Graham Cummins (who all play for Preston North End), and Stephen Dawson (who plays for Barnsley); all seven stated they were innocent. The men were late released from bail. In January 2015 all 13 players were released without charge.

Representatives from a number of sports met in December 2013 to discuss the issue, while former player Alan Shearer stated there should be a "zero tolerance" approach to the problem. Darren Bailey of the FA also stated that the country's gambling laws did not help in tackling match fixing in the sport. In June 2014, it was announced that 13 games were believed to have been fixed in British football during the 2013–14 season. On 1 September 2014, former professional player Delroy Facey was charged over alleged match fixing. The trial began in April 2015, when he was accused of being a "middleman" for others who had already been convicted of the crime. After being found guilty later that month he was sentenced to two-and-a-half years in jail. In October 2022, non-league player Kynan Isaac was banned for 10 years for spot fixing in a FA Cup match.

== France ==
In November 2014, the presidents of Ligue 2 clubs Caen and Nîmes were amongst several arrested on suspicion of match fixing. The arrests followed a 1–1 draw between Caen and Nîmes in May 2014, a result beneficial for each club. In April 2019, Guingamp complained to the Ligue de Fiotball Professionnel (LFP) about a game between Caen and Angers. The LFP said they were investigating "doubts about the integrity" of the result. At the 2026 FIFA World Cup, Ivory Coast player Elye Wahi was initially denied entry into Canada due to an active investigation in France of Wahi for spot-fixing. A suspicious number of bets were placed and won on Wahi attaining a yellow card in a match for Nice.

== Greece ==
Corruption has long been endemic in Greek football.

== Italy ==
- 1948 Caso Napoli
- 1980 Totonero
- 1986 Totonero
- 2005 Caso Genoa
- 2006 Calciopoli
- 2011–12 Italian football match-fixing scandal
- 2015 Italian football match-fixing scandal

In June 2018, prosecutors began investigating Parma in relation to alleged match-fixing. In July 2018, Parma player Emanuele Calaiò received a two-year ban after being found guilty of match fixing for "eliciting reduced effort" through text messages to Spezia players in their final match of the 2017–18 Serie B to gain promotion; Parma received a 5-point deduction for the 2018–19 Serie A. On 9 August, Parma had the 5-point deduction expunged and Calaiò's ban reduced, expiring on 31 December 2018. Another match-fixing scandal hit Italy's top league in April 2026, when referee chief Gianluca Rocchi suspended himself amid an investigation into sporting fraud.

== Kenya ==
In February 2019, ex-international player George Owino was named in a FIFA report that alleged he had been involved in match fixing. In April 2019 Owino was one of four African former international footballers banned for life by FIFA due to "match manipulation". In February 2023, Mathare United suspended two key players, defender Lennox Ogutu and midfielder Alphonce Ndonye, following investigations into allegations of match-fixing in the FKF Premier League due to unusual results and "fishy" defensive errors. Ogutu was later cleared by Court of Arbitration for Sport (CAS) and made a return to football. In March 2025, Patrick Matasi was accused of match fixing in the Kenya Premier League.

== Lebanon ==
The 2013 Lebanese match fixing scandal involved 24 players, with two (Ramez Dayoub and Mahmoud El Ali) being banned from the sport for life.

== Liberia ==
In August 2019, referee Josephus Torjilar was banned for two years for bribery.

== Malawi ==
In April 2019 ex-Malawi international Hellings Mwakasungula was one of four African former international footballers banned for life by FIFA due to "match manipulation".

== Montenegro ==
In July 2025, FK Arsenal Tivat received a 10-year ban in European competitions from UEFA following match fixing.

== Nepal ==
On 14 October 2015, the Kathmandu Police arrested five Nepalese national team players suspected of match fixing in the world cup qualifiers 2011. The arrest was based on information coming from AFC and their collaboration with Sportradar Security Services. In November 2015, these five Nepalese players appeared in court charged with match-fixing.

== Niger ==
In 2019, FIFA banned Niger's referee Ibrahim Chaibou for life for match fixing and accepting bribes. Chaibou, who is considered one of the most infamous cases of corruption in association football, was repeatedly called by FIFA to present himself, but he has never left his native Niger since then.

== Nigeria ==
In August 2019, Samson Siasia was handed a lifetime ban by FIFA related to match fixing. He said he would appeal but was in no rush to do so.

== Portugal ==
In 2004, Polícia Judiciária (Portuguese Judiciary Police) launched the operation Apito Dourado and named several Portuguese club presidents and football personalities as suspects of match fixing, most notably FC Porto's chairman Pinto da Costa. Some of the wiretaps used as proof, which were deemed unusable in court, can be found on YouTube.

== Serbia ==
In January 2008, the president Ratko Butorović of Serbian first division side Vojvodina Novi Sad, stadium director Milan Čabrić and referees Mihajlo Jeknić, Borislav Kasanski and Goran Kovačević were amongst several arrested on suspicion of match fixing. Ratko Butorović nicknamed Bata Kankan was arrested on suspicion of bribing referee Mihajlo Jeknic with 4,000 Euros to lead the match at Lučani on 12 December last year in favor of Butorović's Vojvodina Novi Sad that was a visitor.

In October 2009, Serbia beat Romania in a suspicious 5–0 in Belgrade in a FIFA World Cup 2010 qualifying match. After the defeat the Romanian team headed to their hotel in Belgrade and some journalists saw Adrian Mutu leaving to celebrate with Butorović. In June 2012, Serbia U-19 side played Romania in 2012 UEFA European Under-19 Championship elite qualification the Serbs won 3–0 in Serbia, before the match three Romanian players were seen taking photos with Butorović.

According to Mirko Poledica President of the Sindicate of Professional Footballers in Serbia, it had been a public secret for years that matches were fixed in the country's football championships. 'People have known about match-fixing for a long time, but this is the first time that players talk about it in public. Unfortunately, there is a lot of crime and there are a lot of hooligans in Serbian football. Many of those who know something, have no courage to talk about fixed matches, because of their personal safety. Some of the players have received threatening text messages: if they do not keep quiet, they will suffer serious consequences.'

== Sierra Leone ==
In July 2014 a total of 15 people were indefinitely suspended by the Sierra Leone Football Association over allegations of match-fixing - 4 players (Ibrahim Kargbo, Ibrahim Koroma, Samuel Barlay and Christian Caulker) as well as 3 referees and 8 officials, including Rodney Michael. Koroma later denied the allegations, and an inquiry into the allegations was also announced. The bans on the 15 players was lifted in March 2015. In April 2019, ex-Sierra Leone international Ibrahim Kargbo was one of four African former international footballers banned for life by FIFA due to "match manipulation".

== Spain ==
In May 2019, a number of people (including current and former players) were arrested by police in Spain investigating match-fixing allegations. In March 2023, FC Barcelona were accused of bribing a referee official. Police raided the referral office in September 2023.

== South Korea ==
In 2010, several South Korean footballers were punished by FIFA with a lifelong ban from all sports for fixing several matches in the Korean League Cup. During the subsequent investigation, many top South Korean players were also found to be involved in match fixing after the initial discovery.

== Sweden ==
In November 2019, Nigerian player Dickson Etuhu was found guilty of match fixing by a Swedish court, and said he would appeal. Both Defence and Prosecution said they would appeal the sentence.

== Tajikistan ==
In August 2021, Iranian forward Amir Memari Manesh was banned for life by the Tajikistan Football Federation for admitting to betting on his own games with Dushanbe-83.

== Tanzania ==
In February 2019, referee Oden Charles Mbaga received a life ban from FIFA for match fixing.

== Thailand ==
In the 1999 Thai Premier League, Bangkok Bank of Commerce FC ended the season with only two points from 22 matches. In the last fixture, they lost 0-10 to Royal Thai Air Force. After Royal Thai Air Force won the league by a single goal differential, an investigation led by the Football Association of Thailand resulted in Bangkok Bank of Commerce's manager and assistants being suspended. The club was expelled from the association, and later folded due to financial difficulties.

== Togo ==
In March 2019, Togolese referee Kokou Hougnimon Fagla was banned for life by FIFA due to match fixing. He denied that he had done so.

== Uganda ==
In June 2024, 13 players, referees, and officials in Uganda were banned for match fixing.

== Ukraine ==
In May 2018, 35 Ukrainian clubs were accused of match-fixing.

== Uzbekistan ==
In September 2022, Georgian midfielder Kakhi Makharadze was handed a five-year ban for match fixing involving his club Lokomotiv Tashkent.
