= Nassif =

Nassif (also spelled Naseef, Nassef or Nasiff, Arabic: ناصيف) is an Arabic masculine given and surname originating in the Eastern Mediterranean, primarily from Lebanon and Syria, derived from the Arabic word nasif meaning just or fair-minded.

== Given name ==
- Nassif Ghoussoub (born 1953), Canadian mathematician
- Nasif Estéfano (1932–1973), Argentine racing driver
- Nassif Majdalani (1913–1988), Lebanese media presenter and football president
- Nasif al-Nassar (d. 1781), autonomous Shia leader of South Lebanon during Ottoman era
- Nasif Al-Yaziji (1800–1871), Lebanese author and prominent figure in the Nahda movement
- Nassif Zeytoun (born 1988), Syrian singer
- Nasif Majeed (born 1945), North Carolina politician

== Surname ==
- Abdullah Omar Nasseef (born 1939), Saudi chemist and geologist
- Ali Hussein Nassif (d. 2012), founding member of Hezbollah, former commander of all Hezbollah troops in the Syrian Civil War before being killed by rebels.
- Gabriel Nassif, French professional card player
- Henry Joseph Nasiff Jr., better known as "Hank the Angry Drunken Dwarf," member of "The Wack Pack" on The Howard Stern Show (1962–2001)
- Muhammad Nasif Khairbek, senior internal security official in Syria.
- Paul Nassif, Beverly Hills plastic surgeon featured on the reality television series Botched and The Real Housewives of Beverly Hills
- Rosemarie Nassif (born 1941), American academic administrator, Catholic sister, and chemist
- Zaki Nassif (1918–2004), Lebanese folk music composer

== Places ==
- The Nassif Building, former headquarters of the United States Department of Transportation
- Nasseef House, sometimes known as Nassif House, historical landmark in Jeddah, Saudi Arabia

== Fictional characters ==
- Dr. Leila Nassif, fictional character in the PC game Deus Ex: Invisible War characters
