= 2013 Lebanese football match-fixing scandal =

Association football match-fixing scandal in Lebanon

The 2013 Lebanese football match-fixing scandal was a match-fixing and illegal betting scandal involving Lebanese football players and officials. The Lebanese Football Association (LFA) investigated allegations that players and officials had manipulated matches in domestic and international competitions in cooperation with betting networks in East Asia and Lebanon. The investigation, led by West Asian Football Federation secretary general Fadi Zreiqat, identified 24 players and two officials as having been involved to varying degrees. The LFA imposed sanctions ranging from one-season suspensions to lifetime bans, and subsequently submitted its findings to the Asian Football Confederation (AFC) and FIFA.

== Background ==
Lebanese football had been under scrutiny for alleged match manipulation during the period in which the Lebanon national football team achieved its first qualification for the final round of the 2014 FIFA World Cup qualifiers. In October 2012, LFA president Hashim Haidar said that allegations of match manipulation involving members of the national team had a basis in fact. In December, Al Ahed announced the suspension of three of its players, Mahmoud El Ali, Hassan Mezher and Mohamed Hammoud, as well as club administrator and former Lebanon national-team translator Fadi Fneish, pending an investigation into allegations of match fixing.

== Investigation ==
The Lebanese Football Association subsequently appointed West Asian Football Federation secretary general Fadi Zreiqat to head an investigation into the allegations. The investigation lasted approximately three months and was conducted in three stages, requiring 174 hours of work. The committee heard testimony from 65 witnesses, including 44 players, 18 administrators and three referees. It examined documentary evidence and audio recordings and conducted its work under conditions of confidentiality. The investigation covered matches involving Lebanese clubs and national teams in the AFC Cup, World Cup qualifying and other international competitions, and examined not only final results but also other match events that could be used for betting purposes, including disciplinary events.

Zreiqat said the investigation found evidence of match manipulation involving betting networks operating in East Asia and Lebanon, with some of the activity allegedly conducted through businesses presented as import and export companies. The investigation also examined allegations concerning Lebanon's matches against Qatar and South Korea. However, the LFA investigation did not establish that the 3 June 2012 World Cup qualifying match between Lebanon and Qatar was fixed. Contemporary reporting quoted Zreiqat as distinguishing the Qatar match from the matches on which Dayoub's sanction was based. Dayoub was reported to have been implicated in two matches against South Korea during the World Cup qualifying campaign.

Lebanon's German coach Theo Bücker expressed his anger and disappointment over the allegations. He had previously raised concerns about the circumstances of the 1–0 defeat by Qatar in June 2012, although the LFA investigation did not establish that the match was fixed.

The committee did not have access to all potentially relevant evidence. Zreiqat said that it had been unable to obtain certain telephone records, telephone numbers and bank-account information because those matters fell outside the LFA's authority and required state involvement. The committee initially divided the recommended sanctions into four levels. The LFA subsequently merged the two least severe levels, citing the circumstances of Lebanese football and the cooperation of some of the players, including players who provided information about other participants.

== Findings and sanctions ==
The investigation identified 24 players and two Al Ahed administrators, Fadi Fneish and Ali Zneit, as having been involved to varying degrees.

=== Players ===
The LFA divided the player sanctions into three categories.

==== Category A ====
Two players received lifetime bans from football and fines of US$15,000 each:

- Mahmoud El Ali (Persiba Balikpapan)
- Ramez Dayoub (Selangor)

El Ali and Dayoub were considered to have occupied a central role in connecting players with betting interests in East Asia and Lebanon.

==== Category B ====
Two players were suspended from football for three seasons and fined US$7,000 each:

- Mohamad Jaafar (Nejmeh)
- Hadi Sahmrani (Ahed)

==== Category C ====
Twenty players were suspended for one season and fined US$2,000 each:

- Mohamad Abou Atik (Note: Palestinian) (Ahed)
- Hassan Alawiyeh (Nejmeh)
- Tarek El Ali (Ahed)
- Nazih Assaad (Nejmeh)
- Ali Bazzi (Ahed)
- Hussein Dakik (Ahed)
- Ali Faour (Ahed)
- Mohamed Hammoud (Ahed)
- Abbas Kenaan (Ahed)
- Hassan Mezher (Ahed)
- Akram Moghrabi (Churchill Brothers)
- Bashar El Mokdad (Safa)
- Omar Owaida (Safa)
- Issa Ramadan (Chabab Ghazieh)
- Ali Al Saadi (Safa)
- Hussein Sharifeh (Nejmeh)
- Ahmad Younes (Khoyol)
- Mohamed Baker Younes (Ahed)
- Samer Zeineddine (Nejmeh)
- Ahmad Zreik (Ahed)

Some of the players in the least severe category were described as having cooperated with the investigation and provided information concerning other participants.

=== Officials ===
Fadi Fneish, an Al Ahed administrator and former translator for the Lebanon national team, was considered by the investigation to be one of the principal figures in the scheme. The LFA banned him for life, removed him from its records and prohibited him from entering stadiums or holding any position in football.

Ali Zneit, another Al Ahed administrator, was accused of facilitating Al-Shorta's 6–2 victory over Al Ahed in the AFC Cup by instructing Ahed players to play below their capabilities. The investigation recommended that Zneit be prohibited from working as a player agent or as an administrator at any club.

The LFA also commended Al Ahed for cooperating with the investigation and for conducting its own internal investigation and providing documents related to the case.

== International response ==
=== AFC ===
The Asian Football Confederation received a summary of the LFA investigation shortly after the sanctions were announced and opened an investigation into the report. The AFC requested the full investigation file from the LFA and the LFA informed the football associations of countries in which sanctioned Lebanese players were playing, including India, Malaysia and Indonesia.

The AFC also examined whether the allegations had implications for matches played in AFC competitions. The LFA's findings were subsequently communicated to FIFA for consideration of international sanctions.

=== FIFA ===
FIFA subsequently extended the effect of the LFA sanctions beyond Lebanon. In April 2013, FIFA made sanctions against 23 players and one official applicable worldwide in connection with the match-fixing case. The worldwide action followed an earlier FIFA response praising the LFA for its handling of the investigation and disciplinary proceedings.

== Separate referee corruption case ==
A separate match-fixing case involving three Lebanese international referees emerged in Singapore several weeks after the LFA announced its sanctions. On 3 April 2013, referee Ali Sabbagh and assistant referees Ali Eid and Abdallah Taleb were detained by Singapore's Corrupt Practices Investigation Bureau (CPIB) shortly before they were due to officiate the 2013 AFC Cup match between Tampines Rovers and East Bengal F.C.. They were replaced as match officials before the game.

The Singapore investigation found that the three officials had accepted free sexual services arranged by Singaporean businessman Eric Ding Si Yang in return for agreeing to manipulate football matches. All three subsequently pleaded guilty to corruption charges.

Sabbagh was sentenced to six months' imprisonment, while Eid and Taleb were each sentenced to three months. The sentences were imposed in June 2013.

The three referees were subsequently sanctioned by football authorities. FIFA extended the bans imposed on Eid and Taleb worldwide in June 2013, while Sabbagh was later given a worldwide lifetime ban from football for his role in the case.

The Singapore case involved a separate investigation from the LFA's February 2013 disciplinary proceedings, although both cases concerned match manipulation involving Lebanese football personnel and international betting networks.

== Aftermath ==
The LFA investigation recommended a series of measures intended to reduce the risk of future match manipulation. These included greater professionalisation of Lebanese football, educational programmes concerning betting and match fixing, stronger oversight of betting offices, the establishment or strengthening of disciplinary and appeals bodies, regulation of player agents, and the creation of mechanisms to monitor betting and match manipulation.
