= List of Chinese international referees =

This is a list of CFA International referees. in the FIFA official competitions (or their qualifications).

== Referee list ==
=== Male ===
Current international referee

List of Chinese FIFA international referees since 1994
Referee	Gender	Association	FIFA international	Notes
Yu Jingyin	1955	Dalian	1988-1999	
Li Yingming	1959	Liaoning	1993-1998	
Zhu Liuyi	1959	WSU	1998-2000	
Zhang Yeduan	1963	Shanghai	1998-2002	
Zhang Jianjun	1964	Beijing	1998-2001	
Huang Junjie	1966	Shanghai	1998-2010	
Lu Jun	1959	Beijing	1991-2004	
Sun Baojie	1965	Beijing	1997-2010	
Zhou Weixin	1965	Guangzhou	2001-2005	
Gong Jianping	1960	CNPCSA^{1}	2001	
Yang Zhiqiang	1966	Chengdu	2003-2007	
Li Yuhong	1966	Tianjin	2004-2007	
Zhang Lei (L)	1967	Shenyang	2004-2006	
Tan Hai	1970	BSU	2004-2016	
He Zhibiao	1968	Guangdong	2005	
Wan Daxue	1969	Hebei	2005-2010	
Tao Rancheng	1970	Shanghai	2007-2010	
Fan Qi	1971	CQSA^{2}	2007-2015	
Zhao Liang	1973	Shenzhen	2008-2012	
Ma Ning	1979	Jiangsu	2011–present	
Wang Di	1981	Shanghai	2011-2017	
Wang Zhe	1975	Beijing	2011-2016	
Zhang Lei (S)	1982	Dalian	2011; 2017–present	
Yao Qing	1974	Shandong	2012-2013	
Shi Zhenlu	1978	Changchun	2013-2015	
Fu Ming	1983	Nanjing (2014-2017); Beijing (2018–present)	2014–present	
Ai Kun	1983	BSU	2016-2019	
He Xiaohu	1978	Shaanxi	2016	
Guan Xing	1981	Beijing	2017-2019	
Gu Chunhan	1982	Wuhan	2017–present	
Shen Yinhao	1986	Shanghai	2018–present	
Wang Jing	1984	Guizhou	2020–present	
Li Haixin	1983	Guangdong	2020–present	

- ^1 CNPCSA=China National Petroleum Corporation Sports Association, is a mass sports organization in the national oil industry
- ^2 CQSA=China Qianwei Sports Association, is an organization affiliated with the Ministry of Public Security responsible for sports activities of the national public security organs and the armed police forces.
