= Samuel Edoung-Biyo =

Cameroonian footballer

Personal information
- Full name: Samuel Mozart Edoung-Biyo
- Date of birth: November 24, 1991 (age 34)
- Place of birth: Douala, Cameroon
- Height: 1.80 m (5 ft 11 in)
- Position: Midfielder

College career
Years	Team	Apps	(Gls)
2009–2012	Sewanee Tigers	70	(12)

Senior career*
Years	Team	Apps	(Gls)
2017	Rochester Rhinos	3	(0)
2019–2021	Maryland Bobcats		
- * Club domestic league appearances and goals as of June 24, 2025

Samuel Mozart Edoung-Biyo (born 24 November 1991) is a Cameroonian footballer.

== Career ==
Edoung-Biyo played college soccer at the University of the South between 2009 and 2012.

Edoung-Biyo signed with United Soccer League side Rochester Rhinos on 29 April 2017 after attending open tryouts for the club.
