= Lebanese Football Association =

Governing body of association football in Lebanon

AFC
- Short name: LFA
- Founded: 22 March 1933; 93 years ago
- Headquarters: Beirut
- Location: Beirut, Lebanon
- FIFA affiliation: 1936; 90 years ago
- AFC affiliation: 1964; 62 years ago
- WAFF affiliation: 2000; 26 years ago
- President: Hachem Haidar
- Website: the-lfa.com.lb (in Arabic)

The Lebanese Football Association (LFA; Arabic: الاتحاد اللبناني لكرة القدم, romanized: Al-Ittiḥād al-Lubnānī li-Kurat al-Qadam; French: Fédération Libanaise de Football) is the governing body of association football, futsal, and beach soccer in Lebanon. Headquartered in Beirut, it was founded on 22 March 1933, making it one of the oldest football federations in the Middle East.

The LFA has been a member of FIFA since 1936, the Asian Football Confederation (AFC) since 1964, and a founding member of the West Asian Football Federation (WAFF) since 2000. It oversees the Lebanese football league system, domestic cup competitions, and Lebanon's men's, women's, youth, futsal, and beach soccer national teams.

== History ==
=== 1933–1975: Founding and early development ===
In 1931, Khalil Hilmi, a member of Riyadi Beirut, attempted to establish a national football federation, but the proposal failed after Nahda opposed its formation. Two years later, on 22 March 1933, representatives of 13 football clubs gathered in the Minet El Hosn district of Beirut to form the Lebanese Football Association (LFA), with Hussein Sejaan serving as its first president. Lebanon was one of the first nations in the Middle East to establish a formal governing body for association football. (Note: The football associations of Iran, Egypt, Turkey, and Israel are older.)

The LFA launched Lebanon's first national league championship in 1934, joined FIFA in 1936, and was admitted to the AFC in August 1964. In regional football, LFA general secretary Izzat Al Turk and former president Nassif Majdalani helped initiate the Arab Cup, which Beirut hosted for its inaugural edition in April 1963.

=== 1975–1990: Lebanese Civil War and administrative split ===
The outbreak of the Lebanese Civil War in April 1975 severely disrupted the LFA's operations. Domestic league football was suspended for 12 years, from 1975 until 1987, and political and militia interference hampered the association's administration of international fixtures. In 1979, LFA general secretary Joseph Nalbandian was detained for six hours in the basement of the Kataeb Regulatory Forces' War Council building while preparing for a national team match in South Korea; in October 1984, the federation publicly condemned interference that prevented the national team from travelling to the 1984 Asian Cup qualifiers.

In 1985, the LFA fractured along the civil war's geographic lines into two rival administrations: a western faction led by Nabil Al Raei—elected at a general assembly on 2 May 1985—and an eastern faction led by incumbent president Hamid Khoury, who had headed the association since 1967. Amid the two-year dispute over legitimacy, FIFA froze Lebanon's membership until 5 February 1987, when FIFA General Secretary Sepp Blatter sent a telex formally recognising the May 1985 elections and Al Raei's administration. Following FIFA's recognition, the LFA resumed the domestic championship in the 1987–88 season; although the 1988–89 season was cancelled due to renewed fighting, regular league play resumed from 1989–90 onwards.

=== 1990–present: Post-war era and modern challenges ===
Following the end of the civil war, the LFA expanded its regional role, becoming one of the founding members of the WAFF in May 2000 and hosting the 2000 AFC Asian Cup later that year. After match-fixing allegations led to the annulment of the 2000–01 Lebanese Premier League season, Al Raei stepped down after 16 years in office and Hachem Haidar was elected LFA president in September 2001.

In February 2013, following an internal inquiry into the 2013 Lebanese football match-fixing scandal, the LFA sanctioned 24 players and two club officials for manipulating international and regional matches, including lifetime bans for internationals Ramez Dayoub and Mahmoud El Ali. In April 2013, FIFA extended the LFA's sanctions against 23 players and one official worldwide. In May 2020, amid Lebanon's economic crisis and the COVID-19 pandemic, the LFA cancelled all football activities for the 2019–20 season.

== Competitions and national teams ==
The LFA oversees Lebanon's domestic football pyramid, knockout cups, and indoor and beach formats. In men's football, it organises a five-tier league system headed by the Lebanese Premier League (established in 1934), followed by the Lebanese Second Division, Lebanese Third Division, Lebanese Fourth Division, and Lebanese Fifth Division. Domestic men's cup competitions include the Lebanese FA Cup, the Lebanese Federation Cup, and the Lebanese Super Cup. In women's football, the association runs the Lebanese Women's Football League (founded in 2007–08), the Lebanese Women's FA Cup, and the Lebanese Women's Super Cup. Beyond eleven-a-side football, the LFA administers the Lebanese Futsal League and national beach soccer competitions.

Internationally, the association manages Lebanon's national teams across FIFA, AFC, and WAFF competitions. These comprise the men's senior, under-23, under-20, and under-17 sides; the women's senior, under-20, and under-17 teams; the men's and women's futsal teams; and the men's beach soccer team.

== Governance ==
The LFA is headquartered on Verdun Street in Beirut.

=== Executive committee ===
As of 14 October 2026

Position	Name
President	(Lebanon) Hachem Haidar
Vice President	(Lebanon) Raymond Semaan
General Secretary	(Lebanon) Jihad El Chohof
Treasurer	(Lebanon) Mahmoud El Rabaah
Technical Director	(Lebanon) Francois Dahdah
National Coach (Men)	(Algeria) Madjid Bougherra
National Coach (Women)	(Lebanon) Wael Gharzeddine
Referee Coordinator	(Lebanon) Abdulkader Saad
Futsal Coordinator	(Lebanon) Semaan Douaihy

=== Principals ===
As of 6 April 2020

Presidents
Name	Tenure
Hussein Sejaan	1934–1935
Pierre Gemayel	1935–1939
Fouad Ammoun	1939
Jamil Sawaya	1939–1942
Gabriel Gemayel	1942–1944
Bahij Salem	1944–1946
Nassif Majdalani	1946–1949
Fouad Chamoun	1949–1955
Izzat Al Turk	1955–1958
Pierre Edde	1958–1962
George Dabbas	1962–1964
Albert Kheir	1964–1967
Hamid Khoury	1967–1985
Nabil Al Raei	1985–2001
Hachem Haidar	2001–present

General secretaries
Name	Tenure
Elie Bakhaze	1944–1946
Izzat Al Turk	1946–1967
Joseph Nalbandian	1967–1985
Raheef Alameh	1985–2001
Bahij Bou Hamzah	2001–2005
Raheef Alameh	2005–2012
Jihad El Chohof	2012–present
