= Sammy Kahsai =

Ethiopian footballer

Personal information
- Full name: Samuel Kahsai
- Date of birth: March 5, 1995 (age 31)
- Place of birth: Ethiopia
- Height: 1.83 m (6 ft 0 in)
- Position: Midfielder

Youth career
- 2013–2014: D.C. United

College career
Years	Team	Apps	(Gls)
2014	Washington Adventist Shock	16	(14)
2015–2017	UMBC Retrievers	47	(8)

Senior career*
Years	Team	Apps	(Gls)
2017	Albuquerque Sol	6	(0)
2019	Pittsburgh Riverhounds SC	13	(1)
2020–2021	Maryland Bobcats	8	(0)
- * Club domestic league appearances and goals as of June 26, 2021

Sammy Kahsai (born March 5, 1995) is an Ethiopian footballer who plays as a midfielder.

== Career ==
=== College and amateur ===
Kahsai played four years of college soccer, playing his first season at Washington Adventist University in 2014 before transferring to the University of Maryland, Baltimore County.

Kahsai also played with Premier Development League side Albuquerque Sol in 2017.

=== Professional ===
Kahsai signed his first professional deal with USL Championship club Pittsburgh Riverhounds SC on March 4, 2019.
