= Kay Banjo =

American soccer player

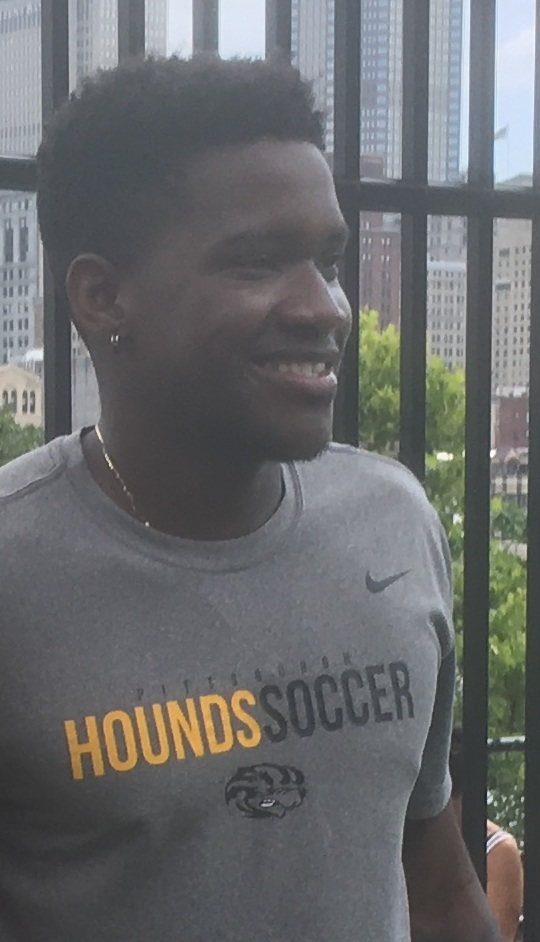

Personal information
- Full name: Olakunle Banjo
- Date of birth: December 3, 1992 (age 33)
- Place of birth: Washington, D.C., United States
- Height: 1.84 m (6 ft 0 in)
- Position: Forward

Team information
- Current team: Maryland Bobcats
- Number: 10

Youth career
- 2013: Screaming Eagles

College career
| Years | Team | Apps | (Gls) |
| 2010–2012 | Towson Tigers | 43 | (15) |
| 2014 | UMBC Retrievers | 22 | (8) |

Senior career*
| Years | Team | Apps | (Gls) |
| 2017–2018 | Pittsburgh Riverhounds SC | 32 | (3) |
| 2018 | Izee Auto FC | | |
| 2021– | Maryland Bobcats | 15 | (3) |
- * Club domestic league appearances and goals as of October 10, 2021

Olakunle "Kay" Banjo(born December 3, 1992) is an American soccer player who currently plays for Maryland Bobcats FC.

== Career ==
=== Youth and college ===
Banjo played four years of college soccer, three years at Towson University, before moving to the University of Maryland, Baltimore County in 2014. Banjo finished his degree at Towson after the university's soccer program was dissolved and enrolled at UMBC as a graduate student. In 2013, Banjo scored two goals for the Screaming Eagles of the Maryland International Soccer League as the team defeated the Maryland Bays 4–2 in the Rowland Cup final, Maryland's qualifying tournament for the Lamar Hunt U.S. Open Cup. The victory put the club within two wins of the tournament proper. The team defeated the Aegean Hawks 1–0 in the next round to put them within one win of the tournament. However, the Screaming Eagles were determined to have fielded multiple players who were not cleared by the USSF and the victory was given to the Hawks prior to the semi-final match.

=== Professional ===
On January 15, 2015, Banjo was selected 38th overall in the 2015 MLS SuperDraft by Vancouver Whitecaps FC. However, he was not signed by the club.

Banjo signed his first professional contract on November 23, 2016, joining United Soccer League side Pittsburgh Riverhounds ahead of their 2017 season. He made his first professional career start on April 13, 2017, against Saint Louis FC. He scored his first career goal in the fifth minute of the match, an eventual 1–2 defeat.

On February 1, 2021, Banjo became the first professional signing by Maryland Bobcats FC, having previously played for the club at the amateur level in the United Premier Soccer League.

== Personal ==
Banjo is a dual citizen of the United States and Nigeria.
