= Ramez Dayoub =

Lebanese footballer (born 1984)

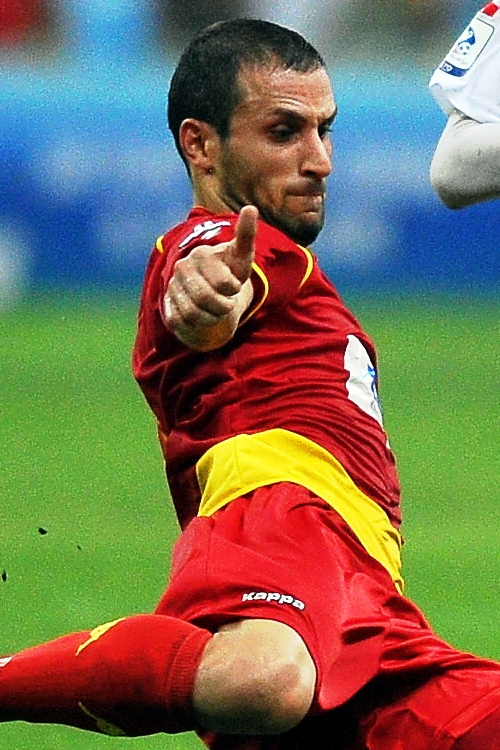
- Dayoub with Selangor FA in 2012

Personal information
- Full name: Ramez Jamal Dayoub
- Date of birth: 9 August 1984 (age 42)
- Place of birth: Tripoli, Lebanon
- Height: 1.84 m (6 ft 0 in)
- Position: Defender

Youth career
- 2001–2004: Safa

Senior career*
Years	Team	Apps	(Gls)
2001–2009	Safa		
2009	Yangon United		
2010–2011	Al-Shabab		
2011	Magway	26	(6)
2011–2013	Selangor FA	19	(3)
2017	Uni Hill Eagles	1	(1)
2018	Hume United	1	(0)

International career
2003	Lebanon U20	9	(2)
2004–2013	Lebanon	34	(0)
2012	Malaysia XI	1	(0)
- * Club domestic league appearances and goals

Ramez Jamal Dayoub (Arabic: رامز جمال ديوب; born 9 August 1984) is a Lebanese former professional footballer who played as a defender. A former Lebanon national team player, Dayoub played in Lebanon, Myanmar, Bahrain, and Malaysia, before being banned from practicing football in 2013 due to his involvement in the Lebanese match-fixing scandal.

== Club career ==
Starting his career at Safa, it was reported that Dayoub had moved to I-League side East Bengal in summer 2009. However, the transfer eventually fell through, as Safa did not issue his International Transfer Certificate (ITC), and the player returned to Lebanon.

He subsequently moved to Myanmar at Yangon United a few months later, playing in an official game, but it was revealed in November that the transfer was carried out using forged documents. Dayoub was suspended indefinitely by the Lebanese Football Association (LFA).

On 11 November 2010, Dayoub moved to Al-Shabab in the Bahraini Premier League after FIFA approved of the transfer. Dayoub played in the 2011 Myanmar National League for Magway. In December 2011, he joined Selangor FA ahead of the 2012 Malaysia Super League.

On 26 February 2013, Dayoub was found to be involved in the 2013 Lebanese match-fixing scandal: he was accused of illegal betting on several national and continental games involving Lebanese teams and the national team. Dayoub was banned from football for life and fined $15,000. In view of the decision, Selangor FA had the player's registration with the Football Association of Malaysia annulled.

== International career ==
Dayoub debuted for the Lebanon national team on 3 October 2004, in a 3–1 defeat to Kuwait in a friendly. Dayoub participated in the 2010 and 2014 FIFA World Cup qualifiers, and the 2011 AFC Asian Cup qualifiers, as well as the 2007 WAFF Championship and 2009 King's Cup.

In the final round of the 2014 World Cup qualifiers, Dayoub was involved in throwing the game against Qatar. He was accused of match fixing and was suspended for life from football. Dayoub ended his international career with 34 caps.

== Honours ==
Individual

- Lebanese Premier League Team of the Season: 2007–08
