= Ibrahim Kargbo =

Sierra Leonean footballer (born 1982)

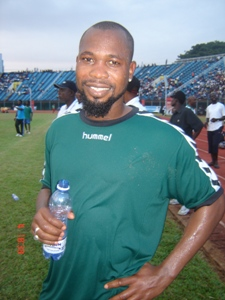
- Kargbo after a training session with the national team of Sierra Leone, 4 September 2008

Personal information
- Date of birth: 10 April 1982 (age 44)
- Place of birth: Freetown, Sierra Leone
- Height: 5 ft 9 in (1.75 m)
- Positions: Right-back; defensive midfielder

Youth career
- 1990–1995: Old Edwardians
- 1996: East End Lions
- 1996–1997: Östers IF
- 1997–1998: Degerfors IF
- 1998–1999: IF Brommapojkarna
- 1999–2000: Feyenoord

Senior career*
| Years | Team | Apps | (Gls) |
| 2000–2002 | RWD Molenbeek | 59 | (0) |
| 2002–2005 | Charleroi | 80 | (1) |
| 2005–2006 | Malatyaspor | 1 | (0) |
| 2006 | Brussels | 26 | (1) |
| 2006–2010 | Willem II | 117 | (3) |
| 2010–2013 | Baku | 76 | (1) |
| 2013 | RWDM Brussels | 1 | (0) |
| 2014−2015 | Atlético | 37 | (1) |
| 2015 | Barkingside | | |
| 2015–2016 | Thamesmead Town | | |
| 2016 | Welling United | 10 | (0) |
| 2016–2019 | Dulwich Hamlet | 70 | (3) |

International career
| 2000–2013 | Sierra Leone | 34 | (1) |
- * Club domestic league appearances and goals

Ibrahim Obreh Kargbo (born 10 April 1982) is a Sierra Leonean former professional footballer. He ended his career with a suspension over match-fixing.

== Career ==
Former teams are Old Edwardians F.C., Feyenoord Rotterdam, RWD Molenbeek, Sporting Charleroi, Malatyaspor, FC Brussels and Willem II. During his time at Willem II he was a key player. He played more than 100 matches for the Dutch side and then moved to FC Baku when his contract had expired. In August 2013, he joined his former team Brussels but decided to terminate his contract a month later.

On 11 July 2014, Kargbo went on trial with Swindon Town along with Elikem Amenku after his release from West Bromwich Albion, although he did not sign for the club. Instead, Kargbo signed for Atlético. He later played for Barkingside and Thamesmead Town, before signing for Welling United in February 2016.

After making 10 appearances for Welling in their unsuccessful attempt to stay in the National League, Kargbo signed for Dulwich Hamlet of the Isthmian League Premier Division ahead of the 2016−17 season, going on to make 45 appearances and scoring 3 goals in all competitions in his first season at the club.

=== Position ===
He plays as a defender or defensive midfielder.

== International career ==
Kargbo was the first choice defender for the Sierra Leone national football team and succeeded Mohamed Kallon as the Leone Stars' national team captain.

== Legal trouble ==
In July 2014, Kargbo was among 15 players and officials suspended from international football, along with Ibrahim Koroma, Samuel Barlay and Christian Caulker over allegations of match-fixing relating to an Africa Cup of Nations qualifier in 2008 against South Africa which ended 0–0.

Allegedly, he was also involved in match-fixing during his time at Willem II, serving as the main contact for a gambling syndicate and selling them losses against AFC Ajax and Feyenoord; Kargbo has denied the allegations. His ban was lifted in 2015.

On 15 February 2016, however, the Royal Dutch Football Association reported it had found evidence of Kargbo being actively involved in match-fixing, specifically in a match against FC Utrecht on 9 August 2009 (which Willem II lost 1–0). Kargbo is now banned from playing football in the Netherlands.

In April 2019, FIFA banned Kargbo for life from all footballing activities due to "match manipulation".

== Personal life ==
His son Ibrahim Kargbo Jr. is also a footballer.

== Career statistics ==
As of 25 April 2013

Appearances and goals by club, season and competition
| Club | Season | League | League | | Cup | | League Cup | | Other | | Total | |
| Club | Season | League | App | Goals | App | Goals | App | Goals | App | Goals | App | Goals |
|---|---|---|---|---|---|---|---|---|---|---|---|---|
| Willem II | 2006-07 | Eredivisie | 32 | 1 | | | — | | 0 | 0 | 32 | 1 |
| Willem II | 2007-08 | Eredivisie | 29 | 2 | | | — | | 0 | 0 | 29 | 2 |
| Willem II | 2008-09 | Eredivisie | 30 | 0 | | | — | | 0 | 0 | 30 | 0 |
| Willem II | 2009-10 | Eredivisie | 25 | 0 | | | — | | 0 | 0 | 25 | 0 |
| Willem II | Total | | 116 | 3 | 0 | 0 | 0 | 0 | 0 | 0 | 116 | 3 |
| Baku | 2010–11 | Azerbaijan Premier League | 25 | 0 | 5 | 0 | — | | 2 | 0 | 32 | 0 |
| Baku | 2011–12 | Azerbaijan Premier League | 28 | 0 | 5 | 0 | — | | — | | 33 | 0 |
| Baku | 2012–13 | Azerbaijan Premier League | 23 | 1 | 2 | 0 | — | | 2 | 0 | 27 | 1 |
| Baku | Total | | 76 | 1 | 12 | 0 | 0 | 0 | 4 | 0 | 92 | 1 |
| Total | | | 76 | 1 | 12 | 0 | 0 | 0 | 4 | 0 | 92 | 1 |
