= 1999 Chinese football match-fixing scandal =

Sports scandal in China

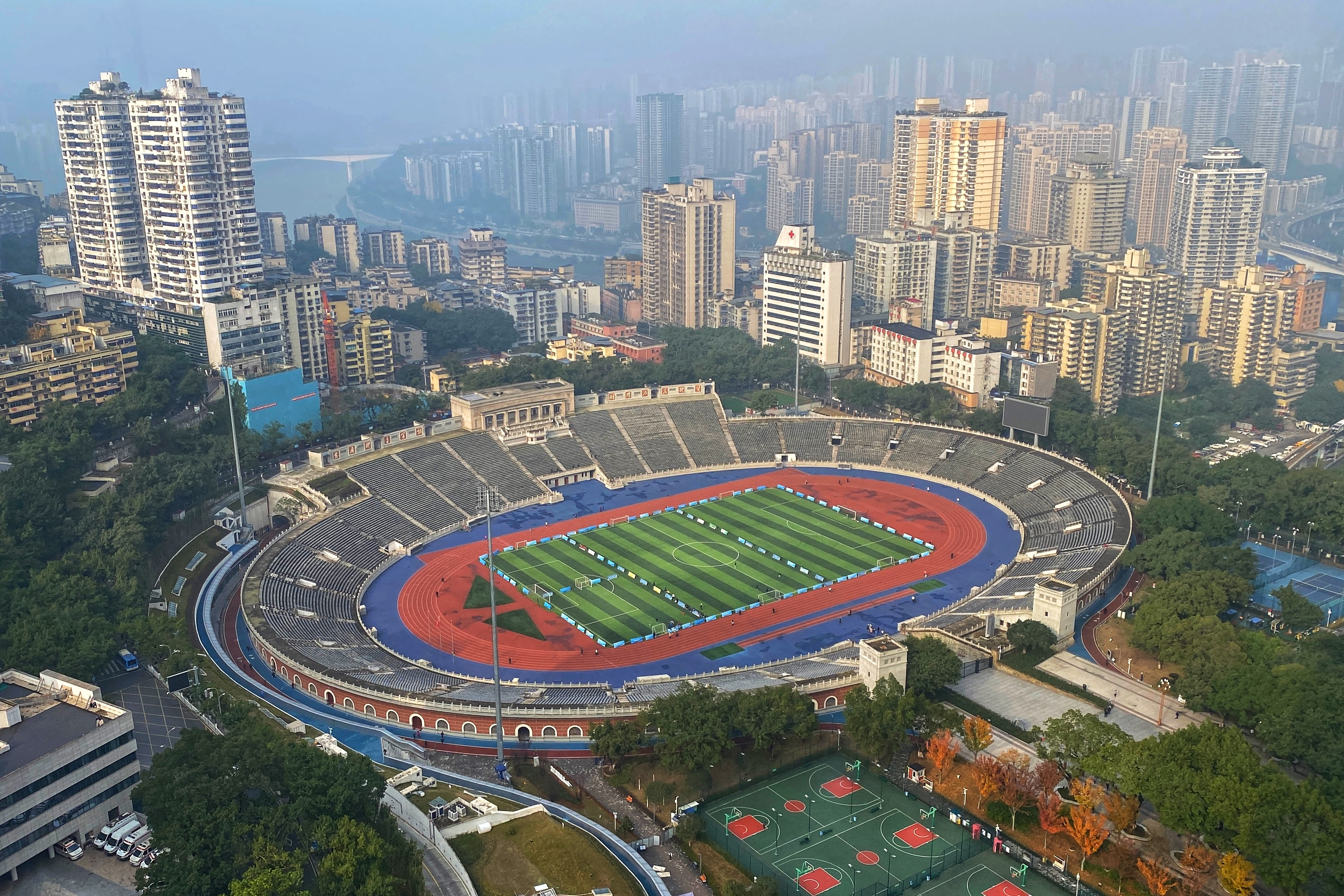
Datianwan Stadium in 2024, where the match was held

The 1999 Jia-A League match-fixing controversy refers to a match between Chongqing Longxin and Shenyang Haishi during the final round of the 1999 Chinese Jia-A League, held on December 15, 1999. The match was won by Shenyang Haishi by 2–1 under heavy match fixing accusation from Chongqing fans. Both teams eventually were investigated and fined by the Chinese Football Association (CFA) in 2000 for passive play as no evidence of bribery was found. In a documentary of the game aired by CCTV-5's Football Night program, referee Lu Jun was suggested to play a central role in ensuring final round's results.

== Background ==
The last two positions of the league were scheduled for demotion. Wuhan Hongtao K already locked up one before the final round of the season. There were 5 teams trying to avoid a similar fate in the final round, including Shenzhen Pingan and Dalian Wanda with 28 points, Qingdao Hainiu and Guangzhou Songri with 27 points, as well as Shenyang Haishi with 25 points. The tie breaker was the face-to-face record, so if every team tie at 28 points, both Qingdao and Shenzhen would rank last.

With a 2-game winning streak, Qingdao was expected to win over Jilin Aodong, a team had no important goal to fight for and was on the road. Guangzhou was expected to at least tie with Tianjin Taida. Shenyang was on the cliff as it was at least 2 points behind others and the opponent Chongqing Longxin was fighting for the second place.

== The game ==
To reduce incentive of match fixing based on results in other stadiums, all games were scheduled to start on the same time. With a first-half goal by Chongqing striker Mark Williams, Shenyang Haishi's demotion seemed inevitable, as the scoreboard did not show how much control of the ball Chongqing had.

However, the match's second half was delayed by six minutes. By that time Chongqing played passively for the second half, triggering accusations of match-fixing from fans. Shenyang tied the game in the 71st minute, and turned the table with a goal in the final minute, 10 minutes after the other games had ended.

== Aftermath ==
As arranged by Lu Jun, Guangdong Songsi lost to Tianjin Taida and was relegated. CFA questioned coaches, players and staff from both Chongqing and Shenyang but did not find any evidence of foul playing; however it still fined both teams for passive playing. In response, CFA changed its code of conduct to include point deduction as a punishment for passive play.

Zhang Jianqiang, the director of the CFA's referee committee who was bribed by the president of the Shenyang Haishi club, appointed Lu Jun to be the fourth official of the game, who just negotiated a plan for Guangzhou Songsi to lose to Tianjin Taida. Lu allowed the game's delay in spite of league rules. Both Zhang and Lu were convicted by the Tieling Intermediate People's Court for their roles in fixing the match among other charges, and were banned from football for life, initially by CFA, and then by FIFA.

== See also ==
- 2003–2009 Chinese football match-fixing scandals
- 2001 Chinese football match-fixing scandal
