= Ibrahim Koroma =

Sierra Leonean footballer

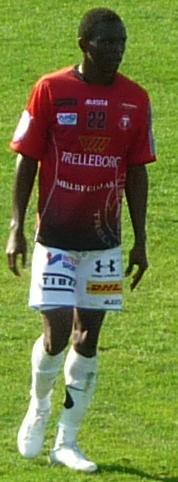

Personal information
- Full name: Ibrahim Marcel Koroma
- Date of birth: 17 May 1989 (age 37)
- Place of birth: Freetown, Sierra Leone
- Height: 1.88 m (6 ft 2 in)
- Position: Midfielder

Youth career
- 2004: FC Kallon

Senior career*
Years	Team	Apps	(Gls)
2005–2010	FC Kallon	83	(13)
2008	→ D.C. United (loan)	0	(0)
2009–2010	→ Motala AIF (loan)	25	(3)
2010–2012	Trelleborgs FF	57	(6)
2013–2015	Varbergs BoIS	50	(6)
2015	Lyngby BK	3	(0)
2016	Husqvarna FF	13	(0)
2017–2021	Motala AIF	69	(4)

International career^{‡}
2007–2014	Sierra Leone	17	(0)
- * Club domestic league appearances and goals as of 26 January 2022 (UTC) ‡ National team caps and goals as of 20:10, 9 March 2019 (UTC)

Ibrahim Koroma (born 17 May 1989) is a Sierra Leonean footballer who plays as a midfielder for Motala AIF.

Previously Koroma played for Swedish Superettan club Varbergs BoIS and the Sierra Leone national football team. He plays both as a defensive midfielder and central defender. Koroma is commonly known by his nickname "Marcel", which is taken from former French footballer Marcel Desailly.

== Career ==
=== FC Kallon ===
Born in Freetown, Sierra Leone, Koroma played for Sierra Leone National Premier League side FC Kallon until 2008. He was capped 83 times and scored 13 goals during his four-year stay at the club. Koroma also helped FC Kallon win the Sierra Leonean FA Cup in 2007 as well as reach the first round of the CAF Champions League that same year.

=== D.C. United ===
American Major League Soccer club D.C. United signed Koroma in September 2008. However, he was waived at the end of the season as D.C. United failed to buy out his transfer rights from FC Kallon. This was caused by the roster changes in MLS from 28 to 24 players which meant that Koroma was surplus to requirement since they wanted to use their funds to give development contracts to SuperDraft players for the 2009 Major League Soccer season.

=== Motala AIF ===
At the start of the 2009 season Koroma was brought in on loan by Swedish third tier club Motala AIF. Even though the club was relegated at the end of the season Koroma returned again for the first half of the following year where he vas voted best defender of all six fourth tier leagues.

=== Trelleborg ===
After his success at Motala he was signed by Allsvenskan club Trelleborgs FF in July 2010. During his time at the club Trelleborg suffered two consecutive relegations and found themselves in the third tier at the start of 2013. This caused Koroma to declare that he wanted to leave the club.

=== Varbergs BoIS ===
In February 2013 Koroma was signed by Superettan club Varbergs BoIS.

== International career ==
Koroma represented Sierra Leone as part of the U-17, U-20 and U-23 National Teams, before making his senior team debut in 2007. Since then, he has represented his country on 14 occasions and was selected to play for the National Team in its CAF Cup of Nations and 2010 FIFA World Cup qualification campaign, playing as a starter in Sierra Leone's matches against Nigeria, South Africa and Equatorial Guinea.

In July 2014, Leonean ex-captain Ibrahim Kargbo was among 15 players and officials suspended indefinitely, along with Koroma, Samuel Barlay and Christian Caulker over allegations of match-fixing relating to a 2008 Africa Cup of Nations qualifier against South Africa which ended 0–0.

== Honours ==
=== Club ===
FC Kallon

- Sierra Leonean FA Cup
- Sierra Leone Champions 2006
