= 2001 Chinese football match-fixing scandal =

The 2001 China Jia B League Match Fixing, also called the Five Jia B Rats incident (甲B五鼠事件) in China, was a series of match fixing that involved five football teams – Chengdu F.C., Jiangsu Sainty, Changchun Yatai, Zhejiang Green Town and Mianyang F.C. – in the final rounds of the 2001 second-tier Jia B League (present day China League One).

Referee Gong Jianping was the sole individual punished for the scandal, he served 18 months in prison before dying of leukemia. Some sport insiders described him as a "scapegoat" and thought the scandal ended up with no real punishment to other individuals and clubs, which might have led to bigger scandals in top-tier league in 2003.

== Background ==
Before the final round of the Jia B league that year, Shanghai COSCO Huili had already secured its promotion to the Jia A League. There were three teams fighting for the runner up position. Both Chengdu F.C. and Changchun Yatai had 39 points, with Jiangsu Sainty was one point behind. The last available promotion place was expected to be decided by net goal difference.

League standings (after round 20)
Pos	Team	Pld	W	D	L	GF	GA	GD	Pts
1	Shanghai COSCO Huili	20	12	4	4	44	17	+27	40
2	Jiangsu Sainty	20	11	5	4	27	14	+13	38
3	Guangzhou F.C.	20	10	7	3	26	12	+14	37
4	Changchun Yatai	20	10	6	4	31	15	+16	36
5	Chengdu F.C.	20	10	6	4	33	21	+12	36

There was already public outrage at the result of previous round, where Chengdu F.C. beat Mianyang F.C., a team in the same province, with a score of 11–2, a new Chinese record. Chengdu thus gained advantage on a goal difference of +21, overtaking Changchun's +18. In another match, Shanghai COSCO Huili beat competitor Guangzhou F.C. 3–2 with an offside goal in the injury time of second half and won promotion to the first tier. Players of Guangzhou refused to return to the field after Shanghai COSCO Huili scored the winning goal and their striker Bertin Tomou waved money towards the referee. Under public pressure, the Chinese Football Association decided to kick off the final round at the same time in all stadiums, hoping teams would have less time to consider the need of match fixing based on the results of other teams.

== Final round ==
League standings (before final round)
Pos	Team	Pld	W	D	L	GF	GA	GD	Pts
1	Shanghai COSCO Huili (P)	21	13	4	4	47	19	+28	43
2	Chengdu F.C.	21	11	6	4	44	23	+21	39
3	Changchun Yatai	21	11	6	4	33	15	+18	39
4	Jiangsu Sainty	21	11	5	5	27	16	+11	38
5	Guangzhou F.C.	21	10	7	4	28	15	+13	37

(P) Promoted

While Chengdu fell behind Jiangsu Sainty with a 0–2 record, Changchun Yatai seemed to have a foot into the Jia A League with a comfortable 2–0 lead over Zhejiang Green Town, whose members mostly consisted of players from the B team of the Yanbian F.C., which is in the same province of Changchun. After the second goal, the Changchun-Zhejiang match was interrupted by protests from Zhejiang players.

However, Chengdu went on a 4-goal shooting spree in the last 15 minutes, which not only bypassed Changchun in the standing but also held a +3 goal difference advantage over Changchun. After the Chengdu-Jiangsu game was decided, Changchun had only a few minutes to overcome the goal difference and it did just that with the help of an early game interruption, scoring 4 goals in the last 8 minutes.

== Outcome ==
With the result having obviously been tampered with, the Chinese Football Association handed down its harshest punishment to date. The number of team promoted to Jia A was reduced from two to one. Coaches and players involved with the questionable matches were banned for a year. Despite no relegation having been planned, Mianyang F.C. was demoted to division 2.

With the exposure of the corruption, five Jia A teams, including the champions Dalian Wanda, as well as the Jia B team Guangzhou F.C. had name changes when naming-sponsors ended sponsorship. Li Shufu, chief of Geely Group that was sponsoring Guangzhou at that time, was quoted as saying, "We won't come back until Chinese soccer environment turns better."

Unsatisfied with the punishment made by the CFA, Song Weiping, the president of Zhejiang Green Town, submitted a list of referees allegedly taking bribes to CFA, seeking to have names removed from future matches. Gong Jianping, the referee of the Changchun-Zhejiang match, was arrested for bribery charges unrelated to the final round, and sentenced to 10 years in prison.

== See also ==
- 2003–2009 Chinese football match-fixing scandals
- 1999 Chinese football match-fixing scandal
