= Rosemarie Nassif =

American Catholic religious sister and university president (born 1941)

Rosemarie Nassif SSND
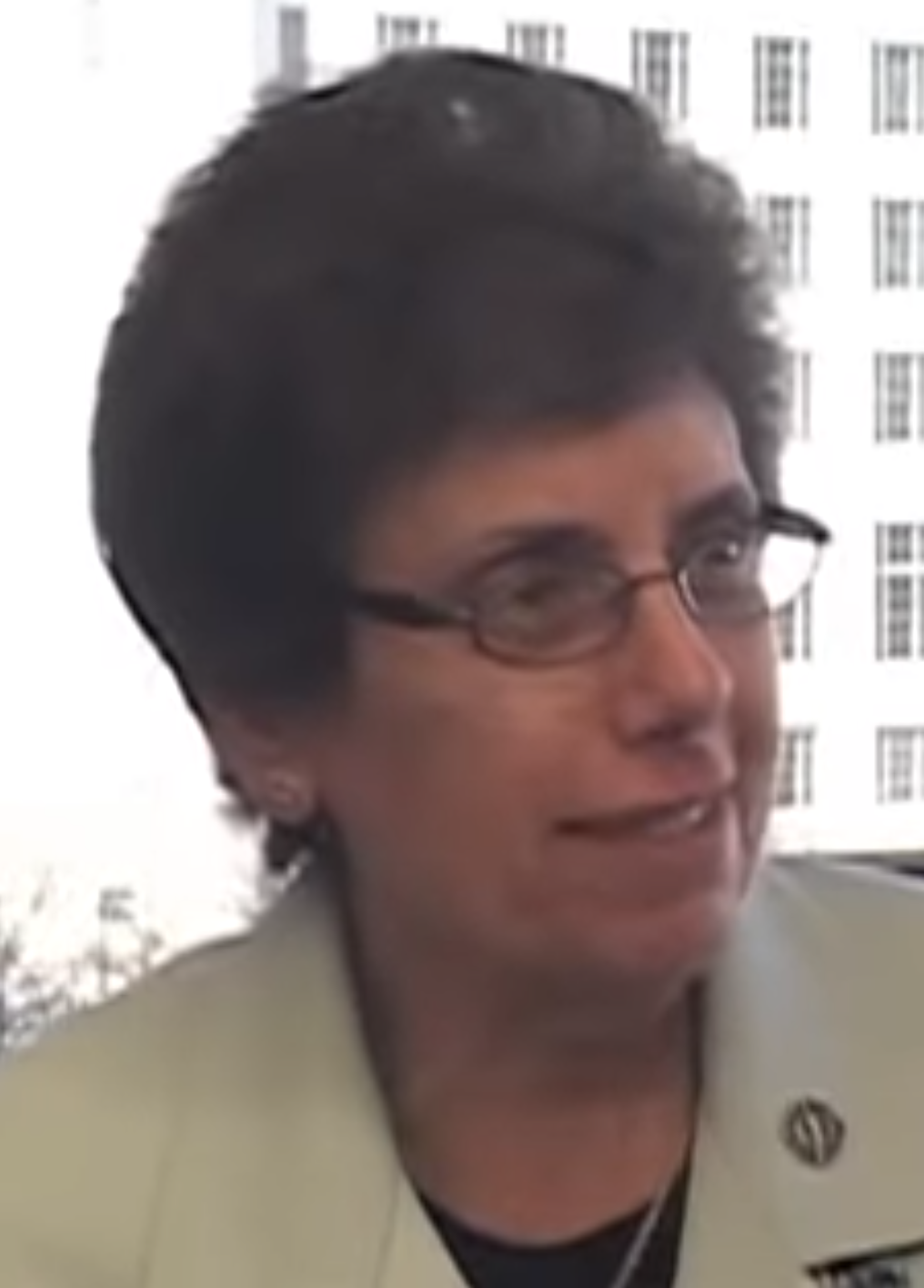
- Nassif in 2012

President of Holy Names University
- In office May 1999 – July 1, 2010

9th President of College of Notre Dame of Maryland
- In office July 1, 1992 – February 1996
- Preceded by: Kathleen Feeley
- Succeeded by: Dorothy M. Brown (interim)

Personal details
- Born: August 2, 1941 (age 85)
- Education: Notre Dame College; Catholic University of America

Rosemarie Nassif, SSND (born August 2, 1941) is an American Catholic religious sister, academic administrator, and chemist. A member of the School Sisters of Notre Dame, she served as president of the College of Notre Dame of Maryland from 1992 to 1996 and Holy Names University from 1999 to 2010. She later served as a program director for the Conrad N. Hilton Foundation and in 2018 was named the executive director of Loyola Marymount University's Center for Catholic Education.

== Early life and education ==
Rosemarie Nassif was born on August 2, 1941, to John and Frieda Nassif. She was the oldest of four children in a Lebanese family and grew up in The Hill, St. Louis. After graduating with honors from Notre Dame High School in 1959, she joined the convent of the School Sisters of Notre Dame. Upon entering the novitiate she initially took the name Frieda but later reverted to using her birth name.

Nassif earned a B.S. in chemistry from Notre Dame College in St. Louis in 1963. She went on to receive a Ph.D. in physical chemistry from the Catholic University of America in 1970. While studying in Washington, D.C., during the late 1960s, she became involved in activism related to the Vietnam War and participated in the Poor People's Campaign, marching alongside Martin Luther King Jr. and Ralph Abernathy.

== Career ==
Nassif began her career in academia, teaching as a chemistry professor at several institutions, including the University of Missouri, Notre Dame College in St. Louis, and the St. Louis College of Pharmacy. She taught at the college level for a total of 13 years before moving into administrative roles for the School Sisters of Notre Dame. In 1987, she was appointed a co-vicar for the Archdiocese of St. Louis.

=== College of Notre Dame of Maryland ===
In 1988, Nassif joined the board of trustees for the College of Notre Dame of Maryland. She was selected as the college's executive vice president in late 1990 in a role created to position her as the successor to then-president Kathleen Feeley. During this time, she completed an American Council on Education fellowship to study leadership at Bryn Mawr College.

Nassif became the ninth president of the College of Notre Dame of Maryland on July 1, 1992, and was formally inaugurated on September 25, 1992. During her tenure, the college's endowment increased from $12 million to more than $17.6 million, and annual giving rose by 33 percent over three years. Her presidency ended with her abrupt resignation in February 1996, which became effective in June of that year. The resignation followed sharp criticism from some faculty members regarding administrative decisions made without significant consultation. She was succeeded by interim president Dorothy M. Brown. Around this time, she withdrew her name from consideration for the presidency of Trinity College of Vermont.

=== Later career ===
After leaving the College of Notre Dame, Nassif served as president of the Fund for Educational Excellence in Baltimore, where she was involved in developing a whole school reform model for the city's public schools.

In May 1999, Nassif was appointed president of Holy Names University. She led the university for 11 years before retiring on July 1, 2010. Holy Names University later conferred upon her the title of President Emerita.

Following her time at Holy Names, Nassif served as a senior advisor to the assistant secretary at the U.S. Department of Education during the Obama administration, working on the president's 2020 College Completion goal. From 2012 to 2017, she was the program director for religious sisters and Catholic Schools at the Conrad N. Hilton Foundation. In this role, she oversaw the granting of $90 million to Catholic sisters in 23 countries and $25 million to Catholic schools in the United States.

In June 2018, it was announced that Nassif would become the executive director of the Loyola Marymount University (LMU) Center for Catholic Education, beginning in July 2018.

== Personal life ==
As Nassif is a member of the School Sisters of Notre Dame, her salary is paid directly to her religious congregation. Nassif is a fan of musician John Denver and enjoys sports such as racquetball, basketball, softball, and bowling.
