= Hassan Mezher =

Lebanese footballer

Personal information
- Full name: Hassan Hassan Mezher
- Date of birth: 31 October 1981 (age 45)
- Place of birth: Haret en Naameh, Lebanon
- Height: 1.76 m (5 ft 9 in)
- Position: Centre-back

Senior career*
Years	Team	Apps	(Gls)
2002–2013	Ahed		
2013–2015	Mabarra		
2015–2016	Hilal Haret Naameh		

International career
2012	Lebanon	3	(0)
- * Club domestic league appearances and goals

Hassan Hassan Mezher (Arabic: حسن حسان مزهر; born 31 October 1981) is a Lebanese former footballer who played as a centre-back.
