= Samuel Barlay =

Sierra Leonean footballer

Personal information
- Date of birth: 15 September 1986 (age 40)
- Place of birth: Freetown, Sierra Leone
- Height: 1.86 m (6 ft 1 in)
- Position: Midfielder

Senior career*
Years	Team	Apps	(Gls)
2003–2004	East End Lions		
2004–2007	Malmö FF	4	(0)
2006	→ Mariehamn (loan)	9	(0)
2007	→ Örgryte (loan)	18	(5)
2008–2009	Mariehamn	15	(0)
2010	Syrianska	20	(4)
2010	Mughan	6	(1)
2011–2013	Ravan Baku	56	(5)
2013–2014	AZAL	24	(1)
2014–2015	Syrianska	26	(1)
2015–2016	Ravan Baku	6	(0)
2016–2017	Syrianska	28	(0)
2018	IFK Mora	16	(1)

International career^{‡}
2002–2003	Sierra Leone U-20	8	(0)
2004–	Sierra Leone	18	(1)
- * Club domestic league appearances and goals as of 11:13, 9 May 2020 (UTC) ‡ National team caps and goals as of 11:13, 9 May 2020 (UTC)

Samuel Barlay (born 15 September 1986) is a Sierra Leonean footballer who plays as a midfielder. He has represented Sierra Leone at international level.

== Club career ==
Samuel Barlay was born and raised in Freetown. He started his professional football career with top Sierra Leonean club East End Lions in the Sierra Leone National Premier League in 2003.

Barlay signed for Malmö FF from Sierra Leonean East End Lions shortly after the 2003 FIFA U-17 World Championship. In 2006, he was on a season long loan at IFK Mariehamn in the Finnish Veikkausliiga. In 2008, he returned to "Grönvitt" after a loan spell at Örgryte IS in the Swedish second tier of football.

Barlay left IFK Mariehamn, six months before his contract was due to expire, in April 2009.

Following the end of his contract with Syrianska IF, Barlay went on trial with Syrianska FC in January 2011, before signing with Azerbaijan Premier League side FK Mughan.

Barlay left Ravan Baku at the end of his two-year contract in the summer of 2013. Following his release from Ravan Baku, Barlay signed for fellow Azerbaijan Premier League side AZAL on a one-year contract, with the option of a second.

In June 2014 Barlay returned to Syrianska, playing in the Division 2 Norra Svealand. He signed a new one-year contract with Syrianska in December 2014.

In July 2015, Barlay joined Ravan Baku for a second time.

== International career ==
Barlay was the captain of the Sierra Leone U-17 national football team at the 2003 FIFA U-17 World Championship in Finland. Barlay is a first choice at the central midfield position for the Leone Stars, as the Sierra Leone national football team is known. He won a penalty for his country which was converted by Mohamed Kallon that gave the Leone Stars a 1–0 win over South Africa in the 2010 FIFA World Cup/2010 African Cup of Nations qualifying match played in June 2008 in Freetown.

In July 2014, Barlay was suspended indefinitely, along with Ibrahim Koroma, Ibrahim Kargbo and Christian Caulker over allegations of match-fixing relating to a 2008 Africa Cup of Nations qualifier against South Africa which ended 0–0. Barlay and his fellow banned players had their ban lifted in March 2015.

== Career statistics ==
=== Club ===
As of 6 May 2014

Appearances and goals by club, season and competition
Season	Club	League			Cup		Other		Total	
Season	Club	Division	Apps	Goals	Apps	Goals	App	Goals	Apps	Goals
Malmö	2005	Allsvenskan	4	0			2	0	6	0
IFK Mariehamn (loan)	2006	Veikkausliiga	9	0			—		9	0
Örgryte (loan)	2007	Superettan	18	5			—		18	5
IFK Mariehamn	2008	Veikkausliiga	15	0			—		15	0
IFK Mariehamn	2009	Veikkausliiga	0	0			—		0	0
Syrianska	2010	Division 1	20	4			—		20	4
Mughan	2010–11	Azerbaijan Premier League	6	1	0	0	—		6	1
Ravan Baku	2011–12	Azerbaijan Premier League	28	4	1	0	—		29	4
Ravan Baku	2012–13	Azerbaijan Premier League	28	1	2	0	—		30	1
Ravan Baku	Total		56	5	3	0	2	0	59	5
AZAL	2013–14	Azerbaijan Premier League	24	1	1	0	—		25	1
Career total			152	16	4	0	2	0	158	16

=== International goals ===
Scores and results list Sierra Leone's goal tally first.

#	Date	Venue	Opponent	Score	Result	Competition
1.	9 June 2012	Estadio de Malabo, Malabo, Equatorial Guinea	Equatorial Guinea	1–1	2–2	2014 FIFA World Cup qualifier
