= Samuel Okpodu =

Nigerian football manager (born 1962)

Personal information
- Date of birth: 7 October 1962 (age 64)

Team information
- Current team: Maryland Bobcats (head coach)

College career
Years	Team	Apps	(Gls)
1981–1984	NC State Wolfpack		

Senior career*
Years	Team	Apps	(Gls)
1988	Orlando Lions		

International career
1979–1981	Nigeria		

Managerial career
- 1988–1993: NC State Wolfpack (assistant)
- 1993–2002: Virginia Tech Hokies
- 2002–2003: Nigeria Women
- 2004–2011: Newberry Wolves
- 2021–: Maryland Bobcats
- * Club domestic league appearances and goals

Samuel Okpodu (born 7 October 1962) is a Nigerian football manager and former player.

== Career ==
Okpodu was the head coach of the Nigeria women's national team at the 2003 FIFA Women's World Cup.

In March 2021, Okpodu was named head coach of Maryland Bobcats FC in the National Independent Soccer Association.
