= Nassif Majdalani =

Lebanese media presenter and football president (b. 1913, d. 1988)

- ناصيف مجدلاني
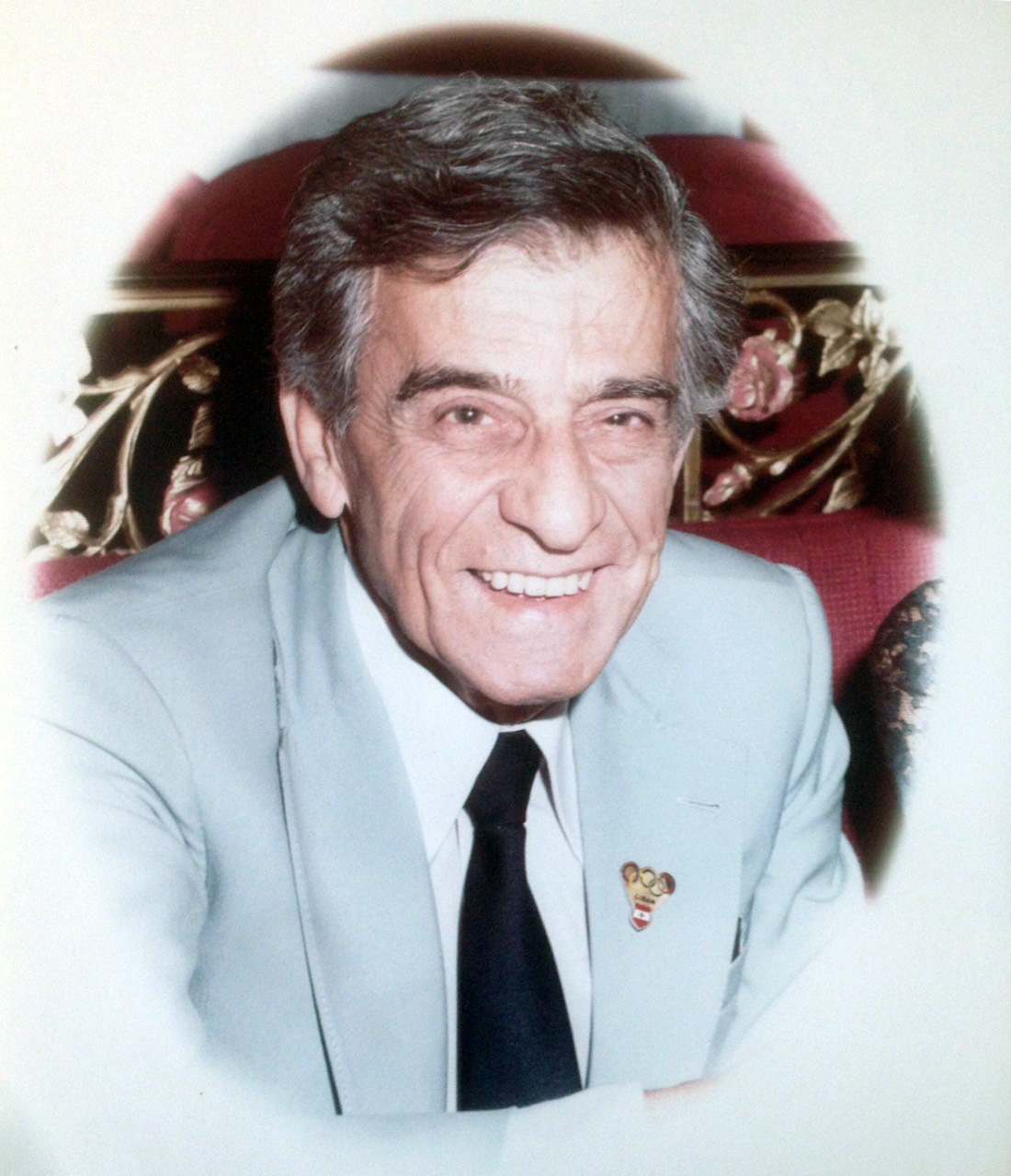

7th President of the Lebanese Football Association
- In office 1946–1949
- Vice President: Izzat Al Turk
- Preceded by: Bahij Salem
- Succeeded by: Fouad Chamoun

Personal details
- Born: 10 October 1913 Mazraa, Beirut, Lebanon
- Died: 8 January 1988 (aged 74) Beirut, Lebanon
- Education: International School of Choueifat

Nassif Majdalani (Arabic: ناصيف مجدلاني; 10 October 1913 – 8 January 1988) was a Lebanese sports journalist, radio and television presenter, as well as president of the Lebanon Football Association (LFA) – which he helped found in 1933 – between 1946 and 1949. He is the youngest president in the LFA's history, aged 33 when he assumed office.

Majdalani graduated from the International School of Choueifat and was awarded the Lebanese Medal of Merit in 1935, as well as the rank of Knight in the National Order of the Cedar in 1955 and the rank of Officer in 1970. In 1957, Majdalani came up with the initial idea for the conception of the Arab Cup, alongside the Secretary General of the Lebanese Football Association (LFA) Izzat Al Turk.

== Bibliography ==
- Sakr, Ali Hamidi (1992). مؤسسة نوفل للتوزيع [Lebanese Football Encyclopedia]. ISBN 0000281247.
