= Christian Caulker =

Sierra Leonean footballer

Personal information
- Date of birth: 25 December 1988 (age 37)
- Place of birth: Freetown, Sierra Leone
- Height: 1.82 m (6 ft 0 in)
- Position: Goalkeeper

Team information
- Current team: Maryland Bobcats
- Number: 30

Youth career
- Kallon F.C.

Senior career*
Years	Team	Apps	(Gls)
2007–2014	Kallon F.C.		
2011	→ Västerås SK (loan)	14	(0)
2020–2022	Maryland Bobcats	20	(0)

International career^{‡}
2007–2013	Sierra Leone	19	(0)

Managerial career
- 2019: Motorik FC Alexandria
- * Club domestic league appearances and goals as of 16 September 2021 ‡ National team caps and goals as of 10 June 2012

Christian Caulker (born 25 December 1988) is a Sierra Leonean footballer who plays for Maryland Bobcats FC as a goalkeeper.

== Family heritage ==
Christian Caulker is of Sherbro and Creole parentage. Historically intermarriage among Creoles and Sherbros was frequent during the 19th and 20th centuries. Caulker is a descendant of the prominent Sherbro Caulker chieftaincy family of Sherbro and English descent. The Caulkers originate from Bonthe District in Southern Sierra Leone.

== Career ==
The first choice goalkeeper of Sierra Leone National Premier League club F. C. Kallon moved in January 2011 on loan to Västerås SK.

In July 2014, Caulker was suspended indefinitely, along with Ibrahim Koroma, Samuel Barlay and Ibrahim Kargbo over allegations of match-fixing relating to an Africa Cup of Nations qualifier against South Africa which ended 0–0. His indefinite ban was lifted on 10 March 2015 along with all other players and officials who were suspended. Although an apology was provided, he was still unimpressed saying due to the impact the allegations had on his reputation, "I am innocent of all the allegations. I only know it is a matter of time the truth will always prevail over falsehood and evil."

== International career ==
Caulker has been the number one goalkeeper for the Leone Stars since making his international debut against Guinea Bissau on 15 October 2007.

He started in all six games for Sierra Leone at the first round group stage of the 2010 World Cup qualifier against Equatorial Guinea, Nigeria and South Africa. Caulker is highly regarded as the best Sierra Leonean goalkeeper at this time. Caulker was the first-choice goalkeeper for Sierra Leone U-17 team and at the 2005 Meridian Cup in Turkey.
