= Mohamad Hammoud =

Mohamad Hammoud may refer to:

- Mohamad Hammoud (footballer, born 1980), Lebanese association football goalkeeper
- Mohamad Hammoud (footballer, born 1984), Lebanese association football right-back
- Mohamad Hammoud (footballer, born 1987), Lebanese association football full-back
