= Gong Jianping =

Chinese football referee

- Simplified Chinese: 龚建平
- Traditional Chinese: 龔建平
Transcriptions
Standard Mandarin
- Hanyu Pinyin: Gōng Jiànpíng
- IPA: [kʊ́ŋ tɕjɛ̂n pʰǐŋ]

Gong Jianping (Chinese: 龚建平; pinyin: Gōng Jiànpíng; Mandarin pronunciation: [kʊ́ŋ tɕjɛ̂n pʰǐŋ]; July 12, 1960 - July 11, 2004) was a FIFA-ranked international football referee from Beijing, China. As a chief referee for the Chinese Football Association, he was the only referee charged for corruption in the 2001 match fixing scandals in Chinese Football.

Gong Became a referee in 1982. In 2001, he became a FIFA-ranked international football referee and a regular referee for China's Chinese Jia-A League and Jia B League.

In 2001, after the 2001 China Jia B League Match Fixing, two clubs, Guangzhou Geely and Zhejiang Greentown, notified authorities about the corruptions in the football circles. The football association called referees to turn in themselves, and Gong was the only one to confess. He became what many sport insider call "scapegoat" for the power forces behind scenes.

Gong was convicted by the Xuanwu District Court for talking a total of 370,000 yuan (44,700 US dollars) between 2000 and 2001, and was sentenced for 10 years of imprisonment. Gong served 18 months before dying of leukemia.
