= Maryland Bobcats FC =

- Full name: Maryland Bobcats Football Club
- Founded: 2016; 10 years ago
- Stadium: Maryland SoccerPlex; Boyds, Maryland, U.S.
- Capacity: 5,000
- President: Jay Saba
- Coach: Alex Kao
- League: National Independent Soccer Association
- Fall 2021: 9th Place
- Website: https://www.marylandbobcatsfc.com/
Home colors	Away colors	Third colors

Maryland Bobcats FC, formerly World Class Premier Elite (WCPE), are an American soccer team and academy based in Montgomery County, Maryland, which was founded in 2016. The organization's professional team competes within the National Independent Soccer Association in the third division of U.S. Soccer. The Bobcats also field teams in both the Maryland Super Soccer League and Eastern Premier Soccer League.

== History ==
=== Local and national amateur leagues ===
The club began as a men's amateur team as a way for friends to continue to stay in touch and for players to stay match fit when looking for potential professional playing opportunities. It went through multiple name changes, settling on World Class Premier Elite as the club was gaining prominence. The club ended up having two men's teams playing in separate areas of the metro Washington D.C. area. WCP were the 2018 Spring Season champions in both the Washington Premier League (WPL) and Maryland Major Soccer League (MMSL). Both leagues are affiliated with the United States Adult Soccer Association (USASA).

In fall of 2018, World Class Premier took part in the 2019 U.S. Open Cup qualification tournament and reached the final round before falling to Virginia United FC in a shootout.

WCP were announced as the United Premier Soccer League's newest expansion into Maryland on November 30, 2018. The team competes in the Northeast Conference and plays its UPSL home games at Montgomery Blair High School's football stadium, in Silver Spring, Maryland in compliance with UPSL's Minimum Standards.

During the 2019 Spring season, the team went nearly undefeated in the Mid-Atlantic Division North (9–0–1) and finished the regular season in first place. It went on to win the Division playoffs, beating San Lee FC and eventually Baltimore United FC in the final. WCP fell to eventual champions Florida Tropics SC in the National Quarterfinals on July 13.

The following season, WCP (which later changed its name to Maryland Bobcats FC mid-season) finished the regular season undefeated. In the playoffs, the team won five straight games to win the UPSL's Mid-Atlantic Division, Northeast Conference, and eventually the Fall 2019 National Championship. The final, which was played at Barry University's Buccaneer Field in Miami Shores, Florida, saw the Bobcats defeat Santa Ana Winds FC, 3–1, in extra time.

On September 26, 2019, it was announced that the club would join the National Premier Soccer League as an expansion team. The Bobcats, originally accepted as WCP, were set to begin play in the Northeast Region's Mid-Atlantic Conference in 2020 with home matches being played at Montgomery Blair High School in Silver Spring, Maryland. However, in March 2020, the league announced the 2020 season was cancelled due to the COVID-19 pandemic.

In late 2019, the club announced it would be rebranding to Maryland Bobcats FC.

The club announced a restructuring in the spring of 2020, which sees the Professional team on top, the Reserve Team (Maryland Bobcats FC II) underneath, and youth teams beneath the men's teams. The youth teams will have access to the men's teams and vice versa, and identified players will be brought up to potentially train and travel with the men's teams.

On August 6, 2020, Maryland Bobcats were announced as a new member of the Eastern Premier Soccer League.

=== Jump to professional play ===
In mid July 2020, the Bobcats were announced as a participant in the inaugural NISA Independent Cup, a regional tournament held by the National Independent Soccer Association, a USSF sanctioned Division 3 league, between its professional members and independent pro / amateur teams. The Bobcats were set the host the event's Mid-Atlantic Region which included FC Baltimore Christos, New Amsterdam FC, and the New York Cosmos at Maryland SoccerPlex before a surge in COVID-19 cases forced its postponement and relocation. Following multiple weather delays, the Bobcats won the Mid-Atlantic region on Saturday, October 10.

On July 27, 2020, the Bobcats announced it had applied to join NISA. If accepted, it would be the state's first professional outdoor soccer team since Crystal Palace Baltimore. Maryland was officially announced as a new league member on October 13, 2020, with plans to begin play in fall 2021.

On October 2, 2024, NISA announced that the Bobcats were disqualified from participating in the 2024 playoffs for not being "in compliance with the league nor the U.S. Soccer Federation", despite finishing the regular season with the league's best record.

In September 2025, Maryland Bobcats FC began competing in the UPSL's DMV North Conference, finishing the 2025 Fall season with a 4-1-4 record, sixth among the conference's ten teams.

== Supporters ==
The primary supporters' group of Maryland Bobcats FC is known as the Old Bae Brigade. Born out of supporters that attended DC United matches, the Old Bae Brigade sits behind the opposing team's bench at home matches. Over the years, the supporter group has established several traditions, such as the Bobcat Fact-of-the-Match and accentuating the "O" in the American National Anthem like Baltimore Orioles fans during the pregame.

== Colors and badge ==
(2019–)

=== Kit ===
2020 home	2020 away	2020 third

=== Sponsorship ===
Years	Kit manufacturer	Shirt sponsor	Sleeve sponsor
2020	Icarus	Holiday Inn College Park	Helping Hands Therapeutic Services, Committed to Change
2021	Hummel	Dog Haus	Kaizo Health
2022	Hummel	Jimmy's Famous Seafood	Kaizo Health
2023	Hummel	Bobcats Youth Academy	Kaizo Health

== Players and staff ==
=== Current roster ===
As of April 3, 2023

No.	Position	Nation	Player
1	GK	USA	Alexander Sutton
2	DF	USA	Elmer Villatoro
3	MF	USA	Samuel Solomon
4	MF	CIV	Dominique Kosséhassé
5	DF	SLE	Mohamed Conteh
6	DF	USA	Abdul Kooistra
7	FW	USA	Malik Thom
8	MF	CIV	Josselin Possian
9	FW	FRA	Karl Mbouombouo
10	FW	FRA	Nicolas Likulia
11	MF	HON	Darwin Espinal
12	GK	SLE	Sylvanus Eku Thompson
13	DF	USA	Jimmy Filerman
14	MF	ESP	Marcos Sotarello
15	DF	USA	Richard Forka
16	MF	USA	Pierre Richard
17	FW	USA	Teshawn Johnson
18	FW	SEN	Abdou Mbacke Thiam
20	MF	USA	Iker Bustamante
22	MF	USA	Andrew Wivell
23	MF	USA	Manuel Gonzalez
24	MF	IRL	Gavin Shiels
27	GK	USA	John Hollinger
28	DF	USA	Phillip Brown
29	DF	USA	Ryan Machado-Jones
33	MF	USA	Akingbolahan Akinkoye
34	DF	USA	Filip Burnett
35	MF	USA	Abdulrahmane Madad
72	DF	EGY	Abdellah Mansour
77	FW	USA	Caleb Pritchett
81	DF	EGY	Zeiad Elsayed
93	FW	COD	William Joe Wangu

=== Head coaches ===
Name	Nat	Tenure
Samuel Okpodu	Nigeria	March 24, 2021 – November 22, 2021
Sylvain Rastello	Canada	January 5, 2022 – February 21, 2023
Alex Kao	France	March 1, 2023 –

=== General managers ===
Name	Nat	Tenure
Sylvain Rastello	Canada	January 5, 2022 – February 21, 2023

== Year-by-year ==
Year	League	Regular season	Playoffs	U.S. Open Cup	Notes
2019 Spring	UPSL	1st, Mid-Atlantic Division	National Quarterfinals	Forth Qualifying Round	Lost to Florida Tropics SC in the National Quarterfinal
2019 Fall	UPSL	1st, Beltway Division	National champions	Third Qualifying Round	Defeated Santa Ana Winds FC in the National Final
2020	NPSL	No league season due to COVID			
2020 Fall	UPSL	Sat out season due to COVID-19 pandemic			
2020 Fall	NISA	Did not participate			
2021 Spring	NISA	5th	Did not qualify	Cancelled	–
2021 Fall	NISA	9th	–	Cancelled	–
2022 Season	NISA	5th	National Quarterfinals	Second Round	Lost to ASC San Diego in National Quarterfinals
2023 Season	NISA	5th	National Quarterfinals	Third Round	Lost to ASC San Diego in National Quarterfinals
2024 Season	NISA	1st	Did not qualify	Second Round	–
2025 Fall Season	UPSL	5th, DMV North Conference	Did not qualify	Did not qualify	–

== Honors ==
National Independent Soccer Association

- NISA Independent Cup
  - Mid-Atlantic Region
    - Champion (1): 2020

United Premier Soccer League

- National
  - Champion (1): Fall 2019
- Conference
  - Northeast Champion (1): Fall 2019
- Division
  - Mid-Atlantic
    - Regular Season (1): Spring 2019
    - Playoffs (1): Spring 2019
  - Beltway
    - Regular Season (1): Fall 2019
    - Playoffs (1): Fall 2019
