= List of flag bearers for Kuwait at the Olympics =

Kuwait at the Olympics
- IOC code: KUW
- NOC: Kuwait Olympic Committee
- Website: www.kuwaitolympic.com (in Arabic and English)
- Medals: Gold 0 Silver 0 Bronze 3 Total 3

Summer appearances
- 1968; 1972; 1976; 1980; 1984; 1988; 1992; 1996; 2000; 2004; 2008; 2012; 2016; 2020; 2024

Other related appearances
- Independent Olympic Athletes (2016)

This is a list of flag bearers who have represented Kuwait at the Olympics.

Flag bearers carry the national flag of their country at the opening ceremony of the Olympic Games.

#	Event year	Season	Flag bearer	Sport
1	1968	Summer		
2	1972	Summer	Younis Abdallah Rabee	Athletics
3	1976	Summer		
4	1980	Summer		
5	1984	Summer	Tareq Al-Ghareeb	Judo
6	1988	Summer	Jasem Al-Dowaila	Athletics
7	1996	Summer	Abdullah Al-Rashidi	Shooting
8	2000	Summer	Fawzi Al-Shammari	Athletics
9	2004	Summer	Fehaid Al-Deehani	Shooting
10	2008	Summer	Abdullah Al-Rashidi	Shooting
11	2012	Summer	Fehaid Al-Deehani	Shooting
12	2020	Summer	Lara Dashti	Swimming
12	2020	Summer	Talal Al-Rashidi	Shooting
13	2024	Summer	Soaad Alfaqaan	Rowing
13	2024	Summer	Yousef Alshamlan	Fencing

== See also ==
- Kuwait at the Olympics
