= Kuwait at the 2028 Summer Olympics =

Sporting event delegation

- IOC code: KUW
- NOC: Kuwait Olympic Committee

in Los Angeles, United States 14 July 2024 – 30 July 2024
- Competitors: 2 in 1 sport
- Medals: Gold 0 Silver 0 Bronze 0 Total 0

Summer Olympics appearances (overview)
- 1968; 1972; 1976; 1980; 1984; 1988; 1992; 1996; 2000; 2004; 2008; 2012; 2016; 2020; 2024; 2028

Other related appearances
- Independent Olympic Athletes (2016)

Kuwait competed at the 2028 Summer Olympics in Los Angeles from 14 to 30 July 2028. It was the nation's fifteenth appearance at the Summer Olympics, although it competed under the Independent Olympic Athletes in 2016, resulting from the country's suspension by the International Olympic Committee for government interference.

== Competitors ==
The following is the list of number of competitors in the Games.

Sport	Men	Women	Total
Shooting	2	0	2
Total	2	0	2

== Shooting ==
Kuwaiti athletes secured appearances by winning medals at the 2026 World Shooting Championships in Doha, Qatar.

Men

Athlete	Event	Qualification		Final	
Athlete	Event	Points	Rank	Points	Rank
Abdulaziz Al-Saad	Skeet				
Abdulrahman Al-Faihan	Trap				
