= Kuwait at the Islamic Solidarity Games =

- IOC code: KUW
- NOC: Kuwait Olympic Committee
- Medals Ranked 18th: Gold 9 Silver 21 Bronze 11 Total 41

Islamic Solidarity Games appearances (overview)
- 2005; 2013; 2017; 2021; 2025

Kuwait has taken part in every edition of the Islamic Solidarity Games since the first tournament held in Mecca, 2005. By 2025, data from the Islamic Solidarity Sports Federation shows that Kuwaiti competitors have secured 41 medals in total — including 9 gold, 21 silver, and 11 bronze. Overall, Kuwait holds the top 18th position in the medal table as off the last Islamic Solidarity Games held in Riyadh, Saudi Arabia.

== Medal tables ==
=== Medals by Islamic Solidarity Games ===
Host nation

Below is the table representing all Kuwaiti medals in the games. Until now, Kuwait has won 41 medals (9 gold, 21 silver, and 11 bronze).

Games	Athletes	Gold	Silver	Bronze	Total	Rank	Notes	RF
(Saudi Arabia) 2005 Mecca		1	4	5	10	14th	details	
(Iran) 2010 Tehran	Canceled							
(Indonesia) 2013 Palembang		1	4	3	8	15th	details	
(Azerbaijan) 2017 Baku		0	0	0	0	-	details	
(Turkey) 2021 Konya		5	9	2	16	11th	details	
(Saudi Arabia) 2025 Riyadh		2	4	1	7	19th	details	
(Malaysia) 2029 Selangor	Future event							
Total		9	21	11	41	18th	-	-

== See also ==
- Kuwait at the Olympics
- Kuwait at the Paralympics
- Kuwait at the Asian Games
- Kuwait at the Arab Games
- Sports in Kuwait
