= Kuwait at the Arab Games =

- IOC code: KUW
- NOC: Kuwait Olympic Committee
- Medals Ranked 13th: Gold 40 Silver 65 Bronze 143 Total 248

Arab Games appearances (overview)
- 1999; 2004–2023; 2027

Kuwait has participated in the Arab Games since the inaugural edition, held in Alexandria during the 1953 Arab Games.

Throughout the history of the Games, Kuwait has won a total of 248 medals, including 40 gold, 65 silver, and 143 bronze medals. However, the country had to wait until the fifth edition of the Arab Games, in 1976, to secure its first medals. That edition remains Kuwait’s best performance in terms of overall ranking, as the nation finished in fourth place. In terms of total medals won, Kuwait’s most successful campaign came at the twelfth edition, the 2011 Arab Games in Doha, where it collected 63 medals overall.

== Medal tables ==
=== Medals by Arab Games ===
Host nation

Below is a table representing all Kuwaiti medals around the games. Till now, Kuwait has won 248 medals around the games history.

Games	Gold	Silver	Bronze	Total	Rank	Notes	RF
(Egypt) 1953 Alexandria	0	0	0	0	—	details	
(Lebanon) 1957 Beirut	0	0	0	0	—	details	
(Morocco) 1961 Casablanca	0	0	0	0	—	details	
(Egypt) 1965 Cairo	0	0	0	0	—	details	
(Syria) 1976 Damascus	4	5	13	22	4th	details	
(Morocco) 1985 Rabat	0	3	16	19	15th	details	
(Syria) 1992 Damascus	8	6	16	30	5th	details	
(Lebanon) 1997 Beirut	1	13	23	37	10th	details	
(Jordan) 1999 Amman	Did not compete						
(Algeria) 2004 Algiers	3	6	18	27	11th	details	
(Egypt) 2007 Cairo	8	10	21	39	8th	details	
(Qatar) 2011 Doha	14	18	31	63	7th	details	
(Algeria) 2023 Algiers (5 cities)	2	4	5	11	15th	details	
Total	40	65	143	248	13th	–	

== See also ==
- Kuwait at the Olympics
- Kuwait at the Paralympics
- Kuwait at the Asian Games
- Kuwait at the Islamic Solidarity Games
- Sports in Kuwait
