= Kuwait at the 2000 Summer Olympics =

- IOC code: KUW
- NOC: Kuwait Olympic Committee

in Sydney
- Competitors: 29 (all men) in 6 sports
- Flag bearer: Fawzi Al-Shammari
- Medals Ranked 71st: Gold 0 Silver 0 Bronze 1 Total 1

Summer Olympics appearances (overview)
- 1968; 1972; 1976; 1980; 1984; 1988; 1992; 1996; 2000; 2004; 2008; 2012; 2016; 2020; 2024

Other related appearances
- Independent Olympic Athletes (2016)

Kuwait competed at the 2000 Summer Olympics in Sydney, Australia. The nation won its first Olympic medal at these Games. 29 competitors, all men, took part in ten events in six sports.

== Medalists ==
Medal	Name	Sport	Event	Date
Bronze	Fehaid Al-Deehani	Shooting	Men's double trap	September 20

== Athletics ==
Key

- Q = Qualified for the next round by position in race or, in field events, by achieving the automatic qualification target
- q = Qualified for the next round as a fastest loser or, in field events, by position without achieving the qualifying target

Track and road events

Athlete	Event	Heat		Quarterfinal		Semifinal		Final	
Athlete	Event	Time	Rank	Time	Rank	Time	Rank	Time	Rank
Fawzi Al-Shammari	Men's 400 m	46.38	41	Did not advance					
Musayed Al-Azimi; Bader Abdul Rahman Al-Fulaij; Mishal Al-Harbi; Fawzi Al-Shammari	Men's 4 × 400 m relay	DQ		—N/a		Did not advance			

== Fencing ==
One fencer represented Kuwait in 2000.

Athlete	Event	Round of 64	Round of 32	Round of 16	Quarterfinal	Semifinal	Final / BM	
Athlete	Event	Opposition Result	Opposition Result	Opposition Result	Opposition Result	Opposition Result	Opposition Result	Rank
Abdulmohsen Shahrayen	Men's foil	Okazaki (JPN); W 15–6	Gregory (CUB); L 5–15	Did not advance				

== Football ==
Summary

Team	Event	Group stage				Quarterfinal	Semifinal	Final / BM	
Team	Event	Opposition Score	Opposition Score	Opposition Score	Rank	Opposition Score	Opposition Score	Opposition Score	Rank
Kuwait men	Men's tournament	Cameroon; L 2–3	Czech Republic; W 3–2	United States; L 1–3	3	Did not advance			

=== Men's tournament ===
Squad

Head coach: (Federal Republic of Yugoslavia) Radojko Avramović

No.	Pos.	Player	Date of birth (age)	Caps	Club
1	GK	Shehab Kankune	28 April 1981 (aged 19)		(Kuwait) Kazma
2	MF	Naser Al-Omran	3 March 1977 (aged 23)		(Kuwait) Kazma
3	DF	Jamal Mubarak*	21 March 1974 (aged 26)		(Kuwait) Al Tadamon
4	MF	Bader Najem	20 August 1980 (aged 20)		(Kuwait) Al Qadisiya
5	DF	Abdullah Husan	13 December 1977 (aged 22)		(Kuwait) Al Nasr
6	MF	Nawaf Al Humaidan	8 March 1981 (aged 19)		(Kuwait) Kazma
7	MF	Adel Al-Anezi	6 February 1977 (aged 23)		Al Kuwait
8	FW	Naser Al-Othman	14 January 1977 (aged 23)		(Kuwait) Al Salmiya
9	FW	Bashar Abdullah	12 October 1977 (aged 22)		(Kuwait) Al Salmiya
10	FW	Faraj Laheeb	3 October 1978 (aged 21)		Al Kuwait
11	DF	Abdullah Wabran*	7 February 1971 (aged 29)		(Kuwait) Al Tadamon
12	DF	Hamad Al Tayyar	10 February 1982 (aged 18)		(Kuwait) Kazma
13	DF	Sadoun Salman	28 August 1977 (aged 23)		(Kuwait) Al Qadisiya
14	FW	Khalaf Al-Salamah	25 July 1979 (aged 21)		(Kuwait) Al Jahra
15	MF	Saleh Al-Beraiky	27 February 1977 (aged 23)		(Kuwait) Al Salmiya
16	MF	Yousef Zayed	2 September 1979 (aged 21)		(Kuwait) Fehayheel
17	MF	Esam Sakeen*	2 July 1971 (aged 29)		(Kuwait) Kazma
18	GK	Nawaf Al Khaldi	25 May 1981 (aged 19)		(Kuwait) Khaitan

- Stand-by players

No.	Pos.	Player	Date of birth (age)	Caps	Club
19	DF	Mansour Al-Ajmi	11 May 1979 (aged 21)		(Kuwait) Al Shabab
20	MF	Khaled Zadah	9 June 1980 (aged 20)		(Kuwait) Al Arabi
21	MF	Husain Khodari*	7 February 1972 (aged 28)		(Kuwait) Al Salmiya
22	GK	Saleh Mehdi	9 July 1981 (aged 19)		(Kuwait) Al Salmiya

Group C

Team	Pld	W	D	L	GF	GA	GD	Pts
United States	3	1	2	0	6	4	+2	5
Cameroon	3	1	2	0	5	4	+1	5
Kuwait	3	1	0	2	6	8	−2	3
Czech Republic	3	0	2	1	5	6	−1	2

13 September 2000
19:00

Cameroon	3–2	Kuwait
Alnoudji 37'; M'Boma 76'; Lauren 86'	Report	Mutairi 63'; Mubarak 88'

Brisbane Cricket Ground, Brisbane
Attendance: 26,730
Referee: Bruce Grimshaw (New Zealand)

16 September 2000
19:00

Czech Republic	2–3	Kuwait
Heinz 2'; Lengyel 90+1'	Report	Mutairi 56'; Saeed 64', 73'

Brisbane Cricket Ground, Brisbane
Attendance: 22,182
Referee: Mourad Daami (Tunisia)

19 September 2000
20:00

United States	3–1	Kuwait
Califf 40'; Albright 63'; Donovan 88'	Report	Najem 83'

Melbourne Cricket Ground, Melbourne
Attendance: 19,684
Referee: Herbert Fandel (Germany)

== Shooting ==
Athlete	Event	Qualification		Final		Total	
Athlete	Event	Points	Rank	Points	Rank	Points	Rank
Fehaid Al-Deehani	Men's double trap	141	2 Q	45	2	186	3rd place, bronze medalist(s)
Khaled Al-Mudhaf	Men's trap	115	5 Q	24	2	139	4
Mashfi Al-Mutairi	Men's double trap	134	10	Did not advance			
Abdullah Al-Rashidi	Men's skeet	121	14	Did not advance			
Saud Habib	Men's skeet	117	35	Did not advance			

== Swimming ==
Athlete	Event	Heat		Semifinal		Final	
Athlete	Event	Time	Rank	Time	Rank	Time	Rank
Faisal Al Mahmeed	Men's 100 m backstroke	1:05.17	54	Did not advance			
Sultan Al-Otaibi	Men's 200 m individual medley	2:16.23	55	Did not advance			

== Taekwondo ==
Athlete	Event	Round of 16	Quarterfinals	Semifinals	Repechage Quarterfinals	Repechage Semifinals	Final / BM	
Athlete	Event	Opposition Result	Opposition Result	Opposition Result	Opposition Result	Opposition Result	Opposition Result	Rank
Naser Buftain	Men's –58 kg	Dlamini (SWZ); W RSC	Salim (HUN); L 1–1	Did not advance				

== Notes ==
- Wallechinsky, David (2004). The Complete Book of the Summer Olympics (Athens 2004 Edition). Toronto, Canada. ISBN 1-894963-32-6.
- International Olympic Committee (2001). The Results. Retrieved 12 November 2005.
- Sydney Organising Committee for the Olympic Games (2001). Official Report of the XXVII Olympiad Volume 1: Preparing for the Games. Retrieved 20 November 2005.
- Sydney Organising Committee for the Olympic Games (2001). Official Report of the XXVII Olympiad Volume 2: Celebrating the Games. Retrieved 20 November 2005.
- Sydney Organising Committee for the Olympic Games (2001). The Results. Retrieved 20 November 2005.
- International Olympic Committee Web Site
