= 13th Arabian Gulf Cup =

International football tournament in 1996

Tournament details
- Host country: Oman
- Dates: 15–28 October
- Venue: 1 (in 1 host city)

Final positions
- Champions: Kuwait (8th title)

Tournament statistics
- Matches played: 15
- Goals scored: 35 (2.33 per match)
- Top scorer(s): (Qatar) Mohammed Salem Al-Enazi (4 goals)
- Best player: (Kuwait) Abdullah Wabran
- Best goalkeeper: (Qatar) Younes Ahmed

The 13th Arabian Gulf Cup (Arabic: كأس الخليج العربي) was held in Oman, in October 1996. Kuwait won the tournament for the record-extending 8th time.

Iraq continued to be banned from the tournament over its invasion of Kuwait in 1990.

== Tournament ==
The teams played a single round-robin style competition. The team achieving first place in the overall standings was the tournament winner.

Team	Pld	W	D	L	GF	GA	GD	Pts
Kuwait	5	4	0	1	7	4	+3	12
Qatar	5	3	1	1	9	5	+4	10
Saudi Arabia	5	2	2	1	8	6	+2	8
United Arab Emirates	5	1	3	1	5	5	0	6
Bahrain	5	0	2	3	4	8	–4	2
Oman	5	0	2	3	2	7	–5	2

15 October 1996

Saudi Arabia	1–0	Oman
Al-Mehallel 76'

Sultan Qaboos Sports Complex, Muscat
16 October 1996

Qatar	1–0	United Arab Emirates
Al-Shafi 13'

Sultan Qaboos Sports Complex, Muscat
16 October 1996

Kuwait	1–0	Bahrain
Al-Khodari 38'

Sultan Qaboos Sports Complex, Muscat

18 October 1996

United Arab Emirates	1–1	Bahrain
Mubarak 5'		Al-Dakheel 48'

Sultan Qaboos Sports Complex, Muscat
18 October 1996

Oman	1–2	Kuwait
Al-Busaidi 7'		Al-Khodari 55', 77'

Sultan Qaboos Sports Complex, Muscat
19 October 1996

Qatar	2–2	Saudi Arabia
Al-Shafi 21'; Bujaloof 86'		Madani 46'; Al-Jaber 66'

Sultan Qaboos Sports Complex, Muscat

21 October 1996

Oman	0–3	Qatar
		Soufi 5'; Al-Ezani 21', 88'

Sultan Qaboos Sports Complex, Muscat
21 October 1996

Saudi Arabia	3–1	Bahrain
Al-Thunayan 6'; Massad 20'; Al-Mehallel 66'		Darwish 14'

Sultan Qaboos Sports Complex, Muscat
22 October 1996

Kuwait	1–2	United Arab Emirates
Wabran 25'		Mubarak 87'; Al Talyani 89'

Sultan Qaboos Sports Complex, Muscat

24 October 1996

Kuwait	1–0	Saudi Arabia
Al-Saleh 3'

Sultan Qaboos Sports Complex, Muscat
24 October 1996

Oman	0–0	United Arab Emirates

Sultan Qaboos Sports Complex, Muscat
16 October 1996

Bahrain	1–2	Qatar
Eid 86'		Soufi 32'; Al-Ezani 43'

Sultan Qaboos Sports Complex, Muscat

27 October 1996

United Arab Emirates	2–2	Saudi Arabia
Hussain 38'; Kasla 90'		Al-Temawi 81' (pen.), 86'

Sultan Qaboos Sports Complex, Muscat
28 October 1996

Qatar	1–2	Kuwait
Al-Ezani 85'		Abdullah 69'; Al-Saleh 76'

Sultan Qaboos Sports Complex, Muscat
28 October 1996

Oman	1–1	Bahrain
Al-Habsi 66'		Al-Dakheel 60'

Sultan Qaboos Sports Complex, Muscat

== Result ==
13th Arabian Gulf Cup winners

Kuwait
8th title
