= Kuwait at the 1992 Summer Olympics =

- IOC code: KUW
- NOC: Kuwait Olympic Committee
- Website: www.kuwaitolympic.net (in Arabic and English)

in Barcelona
- Competitors: 32 in 7 sports
- Medals: Gold 0 Silver 0 Bronze 0 Total 0

Summer Olympics appearances (overview)
- 1968; 1972; 1976; 1980; 1984; 1988; 1992; 1996; 2000; 2004; 2008; 2012; 2016; 2020; 2024

Other related appearances
- Independent Olympic Athletes (2016)

Kuwait competed at the 1992 Summer Olympics in Barcelona, Spain. 32 competitors, all men, took part in 18 events in seven sports.

== Competitors ==
The following is the list of number of competitors in the Games.

Sport	Men	Women	Total
Athletics	4	0	4
Fencing	1	0	1
Football	19	–	19
Judo	2	0	2
Shooting	2	0	2
Swimming	3	0	3
Weightlifting	1	–	1
Total	32	0	32

== Athletics ==
Men's 110m Hurdles

- Zeiad Al-Kheder

- Heats — 14.51 (→ did not advance)

Men's Triple Jump

- Marsoq Al-Yoha

- Qualification — 16.75 m (→ did not advance)

Men's Javelin Throw

- Ghanim Mabrouk

- Qualification — NM (→ did not advance)

Men's Hammer Throw

- Waleed Al-Bakheet

- Qualification — 63.94 m (→ did not advance)

== Fencing ==
One fencer represented Kuwait in 1992.

Men's épée

- Mohamed Al-Hamar

== Swimming ==
Men

Athlete	Event	Heat		Final	
Athlete	Event	Time	Rank	Time	Rank
Jarrah Al-Asmawi	100 m freestyle	56.72	69	Did not advance	
Nayef Al-Hasawi	100 m freestyle	DNS		Did not advance	
Nayef Al-Hasawi	200 m freestyle	DNS		Did not advance	
Jarrah Al-Asmawi	100 m backstroke	1:05.53	51	Did not advance	
Nayef Al-Hasawi	100 m backstroke	DNS		Did not advance	
Sultan Al-Otaibi	200 m backstroke	2:19.02	40	Did not advance	
Ayman Al-Enazy	100 m breaststroke	1:13.49	53	Did not advance	
Ayman Al-Enazy	200 m breaststroke	2:39.12	49	Did not advance	
Sultan Al-Otaibi	200 m breaststroke	2:35.54	48	Did not advance	
Jarrah Al-Asmawi	100 m butterfly	1:00.77	60	Did not advance	
Sultan Al-Otaibi	200 m individual medley	2:13.68	44	Did not advance	
