= Kuwait at the 2024 Summer Olympics =

- IOC code: KUW
- NOC: Kuwait Olympic Committee

in Paris, France 26 July 2024 – 11 August 2024
- Competitors: 9 (5 men and 4 women) in 6 sports
- Flag bearers: Youssef Al-Shamlan & Soaad Al-Faqaan
- Medals: Gold 0 Silver 0 Bronze 0 Total 0

Summer Olympics appearances (overview)
- 1968; 1972; 1976; 1980; 1984; 1988; 1992; 1996; 2000; 2004; 2008; 2012; 2016; 2020; 2024; 2028

Other related appearances
- Independent Olympic Athletes (2016)

Kuwait competed at the 2024 Summer Olympics in Paris from 26 July to 11 August 2024. It was the nation's fourteenth appearance at the Summer Olympics, although it competed under the Independent Olympic Athletes in 2016, resulting from the country's suspension by the International Olympic Committee for government interference.

== Competitors ==
The following is the list of number of competitors in the Games.

Sport	Men	Women	Total
Athletics	1	1	2
Fencing	1	0	1
Rowing	0	1	1
Sailing	0	1	1
Shooting	2	0	2
Swimming	1	1	2
Total	5	4	9

== Athletics ==
Kuwaiti track and field athletes qualified for Paris 2024 by world ranking and universality places, in the following events (a maximum of 3 athletes each):

Key

- Note–Ranks given for track events are within the athlete's heat only
- Q = Qualified for the next round
- q = Qualified for the next round as the fastest loser or, in field events, by position without achieving the qualifying target
- NR = National record
- N/A = Round not applicable for the event
- Bye = Athlete not required to compete in round

Track and road events

Athlete	Event	Heat		Repechage		Semifinal		Final	
Athlete	Event	Result	Rank	Result	Rank	Result	Rank	Result	Rank
Yaqoub Alyouha	Men's 110 m hurdles	DNF		Did not advance					
Amal Al-Roumi	Women's 800 m	2:11.35	8 R	2:12.13	8	Did not advance			

== Fencing ==
For the first time since 2016 competing as independents, Kuwait entered one fencer into the Olympic competition. Yousef Al-Shamlan secured a quota place in men's sabre events, after nominated as one of two highest ranked individuals with the help of FIE and umpires, eligible for Asia & Oceania zone through the release of the FIE Official ranking for Paris 2024.

Athlete	Event	Round of 32	Round of 16	Quarterfinal	Semifinal	Final / BM	
Athlete	Event	Opposition Score	Opposition Score	Opposition Score	Opposition Score	Opposition Score	Rank
Yousef Al-Shamlan	Men's sabre	Szabo (GER); L 6–15	Did not advance				

== Rowing ==
Kuwait entered one boat for Paris 2024. Suad Al-Faqaan became the first female rower to represent the country in the single sculls events for the Games, after receiving the allocations of universality spots.

Athlete	Event	Heats		Repechage		Semifinals		Final	
Athlete	Event	Time	Rank	Time	Rank	Time	Rank	Time	Rank
Soaad Al-Faqaan	Women's single sculls	8:16.32	4 R	8:28.89	4 SE/F	9:01.78	3 FE	8:05.18	29

Qualification Legend: FA=Final A (medal); FB=Final B (non-medal); FC=Final C (non-medal); FD=Final D (non-medal); FE=Final E (non-medal); FF=Final F (non-medal); SA/B=Semifinals A/B; SC/D=Semifinals C/D; SE/F=Semifinals E/F; QF=Quarterfinals; R=Repechage

== Sailing ==
Kuwait sent one sailor to compete at the games after receiving the allocations of Universality places and also marking the nation's debut in these sports.

Medal race events

Athlete	Event	Race																Net points	Final rank
Athlete	Event	1	2	3	4	5	6	7	8	9	10	11	12	13	14	15	M*	Net points	Final rank
Ameena Shah	Women's ILCA 6	~~43~~	43	42	43	43	43	34	42	30	Cancelled	—N/a					EL	320	42

M = Medal race; EL = Eliminated – did not advance into the medal race

== Shooting ==
Kuwaiti shooters achieved quota places for the following events based on their results at the 2022 and 2023 ISSF World Championships, 2022, 2023, and 2024 European Championships, 2023 European Games, and 2024 ISSF World Olympic Qualification Tournament.

Athlete	Event	Qualification		Final	
Athlete	Event	Points	Rank	Points	Rank
Khaled Al-Mudhaf	Men's trap	120	17	Did not advance	
Mohammed Al-Daihani	Men's skeet	120	13	Did not advance	

== Swimming ==
Kuwait sent two swimmers to compete at the 2024 Paris Olympics.

Athlete	Event	Heat		Semifinal		Final	
Athlete	Event	Time	Rank	Time	Rank	Time	Rank
Mohamad Zubaid	Men's 100 m freestyle	52.35	63	Did not advance			
Lara Dashti	Women's 100 m breaststroke	1:15.67	37	Did not advance			
