= Kuwait at the Asian Games =

- IOC code: KUW
- NOC: Kuwait Olympic Committee
- Medals Ranked 19th: Gold 33 Silver 35 Bronze 43 Total 111

Summer appearances
- 1974; 1978; 1982; 1986; 1990; 1994; 1998; 2002; 2006; 2010; 2014; 2018; 2022; 2026

Winter appearances
- 1996; 1999; 2003; 2007; 2011; 2017; 2025; 2029

Other related appearances
- Athletes from Kuwait (2010)

Kuwait first competed at the Asian Games in 1974.

== Medal tables ==
=== Medals by Asian Games ===
Games	Rank	Gold	Silver	Bronze	Total
1974 Tehran	18	0	1	0	1
1978 Bangkok	19	0	0	1	1
1982 New Delhi	13	1	3	3	7
1986 Seoul	17	0	1	8	9
1990 Beijing	31	0	0	0	0
1994 Hiroshima	15	3	1	5	9
1998 Bangkok	14	4	6	4	14
2002 Busan	20	2	1	5	8
2006 Doha	17	6	5	2	13
2010 Guangzhou	17	4	6	1	11
2014 Incheon	18	3	5	4	12
2018 Jakarta / Palembang	21	3	1	2	6
2022 Hangzhou	23	3	4	4	11
2026 Nagoya	19	4	1	4	9
Total	19	33	35	43	111
