= Kuwait at the 2007 Asian Winter Games =

- IOC code: KUW
- NOC: Kuwait Olympic Committee

in Changchun
- Competitors: 22

Asian Winter Games appearances
- 1996; 1999; 2003; 2007; 2011; 2017; 2025; 2029

Kuwait participated in the 2007 Asian Winter Games held in Changchun, China from January 28, 2007 to February 4, 2007.
