= Kuwait at the 2004 Summer Olympics =

- IOC code: KUW
- NOC: Kuwait Olympic Committee

in Athens
- Competitors: 11 in 3 sports
- Flag bearer: Fehaid Al-Deehani
- Medals: Gold 0 Silver 0 Bronze 0 Total 0

Summer Olympics appearances (overview)
- 1968; 1972; 1976; 1980; 1984; 1988; 1992; 1996; 2000; 2004; 2008; 2012; 2016; 2020; 2024

Other related appearances
- Independent Olympic Athletes (2016)

Kuwait competed at the 2004 Summer Olympics in Athens, Greece, held between 13 and 29 August 2004.

== Athletics ==
Kuwaiti athletes have so far achieved qualifying standards in the following athletics events (up to a maximum of 3 athletes in each event at the 'A' Standard, and 1 at the 'B' Standard).

Key

- Note–Ranks given for track events are within the athlete's heat only
- Q = Qualified for the next round
- q = Qualified for the next round as a fastest loser or, in field events, by position without achieving the qualifying target
- NR = National record
- N/A = Round not applicable for the event
- Bye = Athlete not required to compete in round

Men
Track & road events

Athlete	Event	Heat		Semifinal		Final	
Athlete	Event	Result	Rank	Result	Rank	Result	Rank
Mohammad Al-Azemi	800 m	1:47.67	7	did not advance			
Fawzi Al-Shammari	400 m	48.25	7	did not advance			
Bashir Ibrahim	3000 m steeplechase	8:48.65 NR	14	—N/a		did not advance	

Field events

Athlete	Event	Qualification		Final	
Athlete	Event	Distance	Position	Distance	Position
Ali Al-Zinkawi	Hammer throw	71.06	31	did not advance	

Women
Track & road events

Athlete	Event	Heat		Quarterfinal		Semifinal		Final	
Athlete	Event	Result	Rank	Result	Rank	Result	Rank	Result	Rank
Danah Al-Nasrallah	100 m	13.92	8	did not advance					

== Judo ==
Athlete	Event	Round of 32	Round of 16	Quarterfinals	Semifinals	Repechage 1	Repechage 2	Repechage 3	Final / BM	
Athlete	Event	Opposition Result	Opposition Result	Opposition Result	Opposition Result	Opposition Result	Opposition Result	Opposition Result	Opposition Result	Rank
Majid Al-Ali	Men's +100 kg	Boonzaayer (USA); L 0000–1010	did not advance							

== Shooting ==
Five Kuwaiti shooters qualified to compete in the following events:

Men

Athlete	Event	Qualification		Final	
Athlete	Event	Points	Rank	Points	Rank
Fehaid Al-Deehani	Double trap	134 (3)	8	did not advance	
Khaled Al-Mudhaf	Trap	121	4 Q	141	6
Mashfi Al-Mutairi	Double trap	131	12	did not advance	
Abdullah Al-Rashidi	Skeet	121	=9	did not advance	
Naser Meqlad	Trap	117	=14	did not advance	

== See also ==
- Kuwait at the 2002 Asian Games
