= Kuwait at the 2008 Summer Olympics =

- IOC code: KUW
- NOC: Kuwait Olympic Committee

in Beijing
- Competitors: 8 in 5 sports
- Flag bearer: Abdullah Al Rashidi
- Medals: Gold 0 Silver 0 Bronze 0 Total 0

Summer Olympics appearances (overview)
- 1968; 1972; 1976; 1980; 1984; 1988; 1992; 1996; 2000; 2004; 2008; 2012; 2016; 2020; 2024; 2028

Other related appearances
- Independent Olympic Athletes (2016)

Kuwait was represented at the 2008 Summer Olympics in Beijing, China by the Kuwait Olympic Committee.

In total, eight athletes – all men – represented Kuwait in five different sports including athletics, judo, shooting, swimming and table tennis.

== Competitors ==
In total, eight athletes represented Kuwait at the 2008 Summer Olympics in Beijing, China across five different sports.

Sport	Men	Women	Total
Athletics	2	0	2
Judo	1	0	1
Shooting	3	0	3
Swimming	1	0	1
Table tennis	1	0	1
Total	8	0	8

== Athletics ==
In total, two Kuwaiti athletes participated in the athletics events – Mohammad Al-Azemi in the men's 800 m and Ali Al-Zinkawi in the men's hammer throw.

The heats for the men's 800 m took place on 20 August 2008. Al-Azemi finished first in his heat in a time of one minute 46.94 seconds and he advanced to the semi-finals. The semi-finals took place the following day. Al-Azemi finished eighth in his semi-final in a time of one minute 47.65 seconds and he did not advance to the final.

Athlete	Event	Heat		Semifinal		Final	
Athlete	Event	Result	Rank	Result	Rank	Result	Rank
Mohammad Al-Azemi	800 m	1:46.94	1 Q	1:47.65	8	Did not advance	

The qualifying round for the men's hammer throw took place on 15 August 2008. Al-Zinkawi contested qualifying group B. His best throw of 73.62 m came on his second attempt. However, it was not enough to advance to the final and he finished 20th overall.

Athlete	Event	Qualification		Final	
Athlete	Event	Distance	Position	Distance	Position
Ali Al-Zinkawi	Hammer throw	73.62	20	Did not advance	

== Judo ==
In total, one Kuwaiti athlete participated in the judo events – Talal Al-Enezi in the men's −100 kg category.

The men's −100 kg category took place on 14 August 2008. In the first round, Al-Enezi lost by ippon to Askhat Zhitkeyev of Kazakhstan. In the repechage, he lost by ippon to Amel Mekić of Bosnia-Herzegovina.

Athlete	Event	Round of 32	Round of 16	Quarterfinals	Semifinals	Repechage 1	Repechage 2	Repechage 3	Final / BM	
Athlete	Event	Opposition Result	Opposition Result	Opposition Result	Opposition Result	Opposition Result	Opposition Result	Opposition Result	Opposition Result	Rank
Talal Al-Enezi	Men's −100 kg	Zhitkeyev (KAZ); L 0000–1110	Did not advance			Mekić (BIH); L 0001–1100	Did not advance			

== Shooting ==
In total, three Kuwaiti athletes participated in the shooting events – Zaid Al-Mutairi and Abdullah Al-Rashidi in the men's skeet and Naser Meqlad in the men's trap.

The preliminary round for the men's trap took place on 9 August 2008. Meqlad scored a total of 115 points across the five rounds. He did not advance to the final and was ranked 18th overall.

The preliminary round for the men's skeet took place on 15 August 2008. Both Al-Mutairi and Al-Rashidi scored a total of 118 points across the five rounds. A shoot-off was required to decide the final participant in the final round. Al-Mutairi scored one and Al-Rashidi scored three as they were eliminated from the competition.

Athlete	Event	Qualification		Final	
Athlete	Event	Points	Rank	Points	Rank
Zaid Al-Mutairi	Skeet	118	10	Did not advance	
Abdullah Al-Rashidi	Skeet	118	9	Did not advance	
Naser Meqlad	Trap	115	18	Did not advance	

== Swimming ==
In total, one Kuwaiti athlete participated in the swimming events – Mohammad Madwa in the men's 50 m freestyle.

The heats for the men's 50 m freestyle took place on 14 August 2008. Madwa finished fourth in his heat in a time of 22.83 seconds which was ultimately not fast enough to advance to the semi-finals.

Athlete	Event	Heat		Semifinal		Final	
Athlete	Event	Time	Rank	Time	Rank	Time	Rank
Mohammad Madwa	50 m freestyle	22.83	=45	Did not advance			

== Table tennis ==
In total, one Kuwaiti athlete participated in the table tennis events – Ibrahem Al-Hasan in the men's singles.

The first round of the men's singles took place on 19 August 2008. Al-Hasan lost 11–7 9–11 6–11 11–5 11–9 11–9 to Kim Hyok-Bong of North Korea.

Athlete	Event	Preliminary round	Round 1	Round 2	Round 3	Round 4	Quarterfinals	Semifinals	Final / BM	
Athlete	Event	Opposition Result	Opposition Result	Opposition Result	Opposition Result	Opposition Result	Opposition Result	Opposition Result	Opposition Result	Rank
Ibrahem Al-Hasan	Men's singles	Kim H-B (PRK); L 2–4	Did not advance							
