= Kuwait at the 2020 Summer Olympics =

- IOC code: KUW
- NOC: Kuwait Olympic Committee

in Tokyo, Japan July 23, 2021 – August 8, 2021
- Competitors: 10 in 5 sports
- Flag bearers (opening): Lara Dashti; Talal Al-Rashidi
- Flag bearer (closing): N/A
- Medals Ranked 86th: Gold 0 Silver 0 Bronze 1 Total 1

Summer Olympics appearances (overview)
- 1968; 1972; 1976; 1980; 1984; 1988; 1992; 1996; 2000; 2004; 2008; 2012; 2016; 2020; 2024

Other related appearances
- Independent Olympic Athletes (2016)

Kuwait competed at the 2020 Summer Olympics in Tokyo. Originally scheduled to take place from 24 July to 9 August 2020, the Games were postponed to 23 July to 8 August 2021, due to the COVID-19 pandemic. It was the nation's thirteenth appearance at the Summer Olympics, although it competed under the Independent Olympic Athletes at the previous Games in 2016, resulting to the country's suspension by the International Olympic Committee for government interference.

== Medalists ==
Medal	Name	Sport	Event	Date
Bronze	Abdullah Al-Rashidi	Shooting	Men's skeet	26 July

== Competitors ==
The following is the list of number of competitors in the Games.

Sport	Men	Women	Total
Athletics	1	1	2
Karate	1	0	1
Rowing	1	0	1
Shooting	4	0	4
Swimming	1	1	2
Total	8	2	10

== Athletics ==
Kuwaiti athletes further achieved the entry standards, either by qualifying time or by world ranking, in the following track and field events (up to a maximum of 3 athletes in each event):

Key

- Note–Ranks given for track events are within the athlete's heat only
- Q = Qualified for the next round
- q = Qualified for the next round as a fastest loser or, in field events, by position without achieving the qualifying target
- NR = National record
- N/A = Round not applicable for the event
- Bye = Athlete not required to compete in round

Track & road events

Athlete	Event	Heat		Quarterfinal		Semifinal		Final	
Athlete	Event	Result	Rank	Result	Rank	Result	Rank	Result	Rank
Yaqoub Al-Youha	Men's 110 m hurdles	13.69 SB	7	—N/a		Did not advance			
Mudhawi Al-Shammari	Women's 100 m	11.82	3 Q	11.81	8	Did not advance			

== Karate ==
Kuwait received an invitation from the Tripartite Commission to send Mohammad Al-Mosawi in the men's kata category to the Olympics.

Kata

Athlete	Event	Elimination round		Ranking round		Final / BM	
Athlete	Event	Score	Rank	Score	Rank	Opposition Result	Rank
Mohammad Al-Mosawi	Men's kata	24.28	5	Did not advance			

== Rowing ==
For the first time since Seoul 1988, Kuwait qualified one boat in the men's single sculls for the Games, by achieving the top time in the C-final and securing the fourth of five berths available at the 2021 FISA Asia & Oceania Olympic Qualification Regatta in Tokyo, Japan.

Athlete	Event	Heats		Repechage		Quarterfinals		Semifinals		Final	
Athlete	Event	Time	Rank	Time	Rank	Time	Rank	Time	Rank	Time	Rank
Abdulrahman Al-Fadhel	Men's single sculls	8:49.03	5 R	9:04.73	4 SE/F	Bye		8:56.83	4 FF	8:32.67	31

Qualification Legend: FA=Final A (medal); FB=Final B (non-medal); FC=Final C (non-medal); FD=Final D (non-medal); FE=Final E (non-medal); FF=Final F (non-medal); SA/B=Semifinals A/B; SC/D=Semifinals C/D; SE/F=Semifinals E/F; QF=Quarterfinals; R=Repechage

== Shooting ==
Kuwaiti shooters achieved quota places for the following events by virtue of their best finishes at the 2018 ISSF World Championships, the 2019 ISSF World Cup series, and Asian Championships, as long as they obtained a minimum qualifying score (MQS) by May 31, 2020.

Athlete	Event	Qualification		Final	
Athlete	Event	Points	Rank	Points	Rank
Abdulrahman Al-Faihan	Men's trap	123	3 Q	18	6
Talal Al-Rashidi	Men's trap	122	7	Did not advance	
Abdullah Al-Rashidi	Men's skeet	122	5 Q	46	3rd place, bronze medalist(s)
Mansour Al-Rashidi	Men's skeet	120	16	Did not advance	

== Swimming ==
Kuwait received a universality invitation from FINA to send two top-ranked swimmers (one per gender) in their respective individual events to the Olympics, based on the FINA Points System of June 28, 2021.

Athlete	Event	Heat		Semifinal		Final	
Athlete	Event	Time	Rank	Time	Rank	Time	Rank
Abbas Qali	Men's 100 m butterfly	53.62	48	Did not advance			
Lara Dashti	Women's 50 m freestyle	29.69	67	Did not advance			
