= Ahmed Mubarak =

Ahmed bin Mubarak or Ahmad bin Mubarak is an Arabic given name or a patronymic name, literally Ahmed, Son of [a person called] Mubarak. Since the introduction of surname, it also in form of Ahmed Al Mubarak, literally Ahmed, descendants of [a person called] Mubarak.

Ahmed Mubarak may refer to:

- Ahmed Mubarak Al Khattal (born 1988), Bahraini international footballer
- Ahmed Mubarak Al-Mahaijri (born 1985), Omani international footballer
- Ahmed Mubarak Al Shafi (born 1974), Qatari international footballer
- Ahmed Ishtiaq Mubarak (1948–2013), Malaysian Olympic hurdler
- Ahmed ibn Mubarak (died 1230), the seventh Tayyibi Isma'ili Dāʿī al-Muṭlaq in Yemen (1229–1230)
