= Kuwait national football team results =

The following are the Kuwait national football team results in its official international matches.

== 1990s ==
| # | Date | Opponent | Result | Score | Venue | Competition |
|---|---|---|---|---|---|---|
| | 18 Feb 1996 | Egypt | W | 2–0 | Kuwait City, Kuwait | Friendly |
| | 14 Apr 1998 | Iran | D | 1–1 | Tabriz, Iran | Friendly |
| | 24 May 1998 | United States | L | 0–2 | Portland, United States | Friendly |
| | 9 Sep 1998 | Lebanon | D | 0–0 | Kuwait City, Kuwait | Friendly |
| | 13 Sep 1998 | North Korea | W | 4–0 | Kuwait City, Kuwait | Friendly |
| | 24 Sep 1998 | Egypt | W | 4–1 | Doha, Qatar | 1998 Arab Nations Cup |
| | 26 Sep 1998 | Syria | W | 4–0 | Doha, Qatar | 1998 Arab Nations Cup |
| | 29 Sep 1998 | Saudi Arabia | L | 1–2 | Doha, Qatar | 1998 Arab Nations Cup |
| | 1 Oct 1998 | United Arab Emirates | W | 4–1 | Doha, Qatar | 1998 Arab Nations Cup |
| | 13 Oct 1998 | Iran | W | 3–0 | Kuwait City, Kuwait | Friendly |
| | 31 Oct 1998 | Saudi Arabia | L | 1–2 | Riffa, Bahrain | 14th Arabian Gulf Cup |
| | 2 Nov 1998 | Qatar | W | 6–2 | Riffa, Bahrain | 14th Arabian Gulf Cup |
| | 6 Nov 1998 | Bahrain | W | 2–0 | Riffa, Bahrain | 14th Arabian Gulf Cup |
| | 9 Nov 1998 | Oman | W | 5–0 | Riffa, Bahrain | 14th Arabian Gulf Cup |
| | 12 Nov 1998 | United Arab Emirates | W | 4–1 | Riffa, Bahrain | 14th Arabian Gulf Cup |
| | 1 Dec 1998 | Mongolia | W | 11–0 | Bangkok, Thailand | 1998 Asian Games |
| | 3 Dec 1998 | Uzbekistan | D | 3–3 | Bangkok, Thailand | 1998 Asian Games |
| | 7 Dec 1998 | United Arab Emirates | W | 5–0 | Bangkok, Thailand | 1998 Asian Games |
| | 9 Dec 1998 | Japan | L | 1–2 | Bangkok, Thailand | 1998 Asian Games |
| | 11 Dec 1998 | South Korea | L | 0–1 | Bangkok, Thailand | 1998 Asian Games |
| | 14 Dec 1998 | Qatar | D | 0–0 | Bangkok, Thailand | 1998 Asian Games |
| | 16 Dec 1998 | Thailand | W | 3–0 | Bangkok, Thailand | 1998 Asian Games |
| | 19 Dec 1998 | Iran | L | 0–2 | Bangkok, Thailand | 1998 Asian Games |
| | 27 Dec 1998 | Egypt | D | 1–1 | Kuwait City, Kuwait | Friendly |
| | 15 Feb 1999 | Iran | L | 1–2 | Kuwait City, Kuwait | 1999 Ciao February Cup |

== 2000s ==
| # | Date | Opponent | Result | Score | Venue | Competition |
|---|---|---|---|---|---|---|
| | 31 Jan 2000 | Syria | W | 4–0 | Kuwait City, Kuwait | Friendly |
| | 4 Feb 2000 | Iran | D | 1–1 | Kuwait City, Kuwait | Friendly |
| | 10 Feb 2000 | Turkmenistan | W | 6–1 | Kuwait City, Kuwait | 2000 Asian Cup Qualifier |
| | 14 Feb 2000 | Bhutan | W | 20–0 | Kuwait City, Kuwait | 2000 Asian Cup Qualifier |
| | 16 Feb 2000 | Yemen | W | 2–0 | Kuwait City, Kuwait | 2000 Asian Cup Qualifier |
| | 18 Feb 2000 | Nepal | W | 5–0 | Kuwait City, Kuwait | 2000 Asian Cup Qualifier |
| | 25 Jun 2000 | Lebanon | L | 1–3 | Tripoli, Lebanon | Friendly |
| | 24 Sep 2000 | Qatar | D | 0–0 | Kuwait City, Kuwait | Friendly |
| | 30 Sep 2000 | Thailand | W | 3–2 | Kuwait City, Kuwait | Friendly |
| | 4 Oct 2000 | Australia | L | 0–1 | Dubai, United Arab Emirates | Friendly |
| | 7 Oct 2000 | United Arab Emirates | L | 0–1 | Dubai, United Arab Emirates | Friendly |
| | 13 Oct 2000 | Indonesia | D | 0–0 | Tripoli, Lebanon | 2000 Asian Cup |
| | 16 Oct 2000 | South Korea | W | 1–0 | Tripoli, Lebanon | 2000 Asian Cup |
| | 19 Oct 2000 | China | D | 0–0 | Tripoli, Lebanon | 2000 Asian Cup |
| | 24 Oct 2000 | Saudi Arabia | L | 2–3 | Beirut, Lebanon | 2000 Asian Cup |
| | 12 Jan 2001 | Qatar | L | 0–1 | Doha, Qatar | Friendly |
| | 17 Jan 2001 | Syria | W | 2–0 | Doha, Qatar | Friendly |
| | 23 Jan 2001 | Thailand | L | 4–5 | Bangkok, Thailand | Friendly |
| | 3 Feb 2001 | Bahrain | W | 2–1 | Singapore | 2002 World Cup Qualifier |
| | 6 Feb 2001 | Singapore | D | 1–1 | Singapore | 2002 World Cup Qualifier |
| | 9 Feb 2001 | Kyrgyzstan | W | 3–0 | Singapore | 2002 World Cup Qualifier |
| | 15 Feb 2001 | Finland | W | 4–3 | Kuwait City, Kuwait | Friendly |
| | 21 Feb 2001 | Singapore | W | 1–0 | Kuwait City, Kuwait | 2002 World Cup Qualifier |
| | 24 Feb 2001 | Kyrgyzstan | W | 2–0 | Kuwait City, Kuwait | 2002 World Cup Qualifier |
| | 27 Feb 2001 | Bahrain | L | 0–1 | Kuwait City, Kuwait | 2002 World Cup Qualifier |
| | 3 Aug 2001 | Trinidad and Tobago | D | 1–1 | Shanghai, China | Friendly |
| | 5 Aug 2001 | North Korea | D | 1–1 | Shanghai, China | Friendly |
| | 18 Oct 2001 | Qatar | L | 0–1 | Kuwait City, Kuwait | Friendly |
| | 29 Nov 2001 | Oman | D | 1–1 | Muscat, Oman | Friendly |
| | 29 Dec 2001 | Syria | D | 0–0 | Kuwait City, Kuwait | Friendly |
| | 31 Dec 2001 | Syria | D | 2–2 | Kuwait City, Kuwait | Friendly |
| | 5 Jan 2002 | Zimbabwe | W | 3–0 | Kuwait City, Kuwait | Friendly |
| | 8 Jan 2002 | Iceland | D | 0–0 | Muscat, Oman | Friendly |
| | 16 Jan 2002 | Saudi Arabia | D | 1–1 | Riyadh, Saudi Arabia | 15th Arabian Gulf Cup |
| | 19 Jan 2002 | Oman | L | 1–3 | Riyadh, Saudi Arabia | 15th Arabian Gulf Cup |
| | 22 Jan 2002 | Bahrain | D | 0–0 | Riyadh, Saudi Arabia | 15th Arabian Gulf Cup |
| | 26 Jan 2002 | Qatar | L | 0–1 | Riyadh, Saudi Arabia | 15th Arabian Gulf Cup |
| | 29 Jan 2002 | United Arab Emirates | W | 2–1 | Riyadh, Saudi Arabia | 15th Arabian Gulf Cup |
| | 09 May 2002 | Germany | L | 0–7 | Freiburg, Germany | Friendly |
| | 30 May 2002 | Iran | L | 1–3 | Kuwait City, Kuwait | Friendly |
| | 16 Dec 2002 | Morocco | D | 1–1 | Kuwait City, Kuwait | 2002 Arab Nations Cup |
| | 18 Dec 2002 | Sudan | W | 1–0 | Kuwait City, Kuwait | 2002 Arab Nations Cup |
| | 23 Dec 2002 | Jordan | L | 1–2 | Kuwait City, Kuwait | 2002 Arab Nations Cup |
| | 25 Dec 2002 | Palestine | D | 3–3 | Kuwait City, Kuwait | 2002 Arab Nations Cup |
| | 4 Sep 2003 | Singapore | W | 3–1 | Singapore | 2004 Asian Cup Qualifier |
| | 14 Sep 2003 | Qatar | W | 2–1 | Hawally, Kuwait | 2004 Asian Cup Qualifier |
| | 20 Sep 2003 | Qatar | D | 2–2 | Doha, Qatar | 2004 Asian Cup Qualifier |
| | 27 Sep 2003 | Singapore | W | 4–0 | Hawally, Kuwait | 2004 Asian Cup Qualifier |
| | 5 Oct 2003 | Palestine | W | 2–1 | Hawally, Kuwait | 2004 Asian Cup Qualifier |
| | 8 Oct 2003 | Palestine | W | 4–0 | Hawally, Kuwait | 2004 Asian Cup Qualifier |
| | 19 Nov 2003 | Portugal | L | 0–8 | Leiria, Portugal | Friendly |
| | 2 Dec 2003 | Iran | W | 3–1 | Kuwait City, Kuwait | Friendly |
| | 10 Dec 2003 | Slovakia | L | 0–2 | Larnaca, Cyprus | Friendly |
| | 16 Dec 2003 | Lebanon | W | 2–0 | Larnaca, Cyprus | Friendly |
| | 18 Dec 2003 | Lebanon | D | 0–0 | Larnaca, Cyprus | Friendly |
| | 20 Dec 2003 | Latvia | W | 2–0 | Larnaca, Cyprus | Friendly |
| | 26 Dec 2003 | Oman | D | 0–0 | Kuwait City, Kuwait | 16th Arabian Gulf Cup |
| | 29 Dec 2003 | United Arab Emirates | L | 0–2 | Kuwait City, Kuwait | 16th Arabian Gulf Cup |
| | 1 Jan 2004 | Yemen | W | 4–0 | Kuwait City, Kuwait | 16th Arabian Gulf Cup |
| | 4 Jan 2004 | Saudi Arabia | D | 1–1 | Kuwait City, Kuwait | 16th Arabian Gulf Cup |
| | 8 Jan 2004 | Qatar | L | 1–2 | Kuwait City, Kuwait | 16th Arabian Gulf Cup |
| | 10 Jan 2004 | Bahrain | L | 0–4 | Kuwait City, Kuwait | 16th Arabian Gulf Cup |
| | 18 Feb 2004 | China | L | 0–1 | Guangzhou, China | 2006 World Cup Qualifier |
| | 31 Mar 2004 | Malaysia | W | 2–0 | Kuantan, Malaysia | 2006 World Cup Qualifier |
| | 1 Jun 2004 | Syria | L | 0–1 | Kuwait City, Kuwait | Friendly |
| | 3 Jun 2004 | Syria | L | 1–2 | Kuwait City, Kuwait | Friendly |
| | 9 Jun 2004 | Hong Kong | W | 4–0 | Kuwait City, Kuwait | 2006 World Cup Qualifier |
| | 19 Jul 2004 | United Arab Emirates | W | 3–1 | Jinan, China | 2004 Asian Cup |
| | 23 Jul 2004 | Jordan | L | 0–2 | Jinan, China | 2004 Asian Cup |
| | 27 Jul 2004 | South Korea | L | 0–4 | Jinan, China | 2004 Asian Cup |
| | 1 Sep 2004 | Saudi Arabia | D | 1–1 | Riyadh, Saudi Arabia | Friendly |
| | 8 Sep 2004 | Hong Kong | W | 2–0 | Hong Kong | 2006 World Cup Qualifier |
| | 29 Sep 2004 | Syria | D | 1–1 | Tripoli, Lebanon | Friendly |
| | 3 Oct 2004 | Lebanon | W | 3–1 | Tripoli, Lebanon | Friendly |
| | 6 Oct 2004 | Lebanon | D | 1–1 | Beirut, Lebanon | Friendly |
| | 13 Oct 2004 | China | W | 1–0 | Kuwait City, Kuwait | 2006 World Cup Qualifier |
| | 5 Nov 2004 | India | L | 2–3 | Kuwait City, Kuwait | Friendly |
| | 10 Nov 2004 | Kyrgyzstan | W | 3–0 | Kuwait City, Kuwait | Friendly |
| | 17 Nov 2004 | Malaysia | W | 6–1 | Kuwait City, Kuwait | 2006 World Cup Qualifier |
| | 27 Nov 2004 | United Arab Emirates | W | 1–0 | Abu Dhabi, United Arab Emirates | Friendly |
| | 3 Dec 2004 | United Arab Emirates | D | 1–1 | Dubai, United Arab Emirates | Friendly |
| | 6 Dec 2004 | Tajikistan | W | 3–0 | Kuwait City, Kuwait | Friendly |
| | 11 Dec 2004 | Saudi Arabia | W | 2–1 | Al Rayyan, Qatar | 17th Arabian Gulf Cup |
| | 14 Dec 2004 | Bahrain | D | 1–1 | Al Rayyan, Qatar | 17th Arabian Gulf Cup |
| | 17 Dec 2004 | Yemen | W | 3–0 | Doha, Qatar | 17th Arabian Gulf Cup |
| | 20 Dec 2004 | Qatar | L | 0–2 | Doha, Qatar | 17th Arabian Gulf Cup |
| | 23 Dec 2004 | Bahrain | L | 1–3 | Doha, Qatar | 17th Arabian Gulf Cup |
| | 21 Jan 2005 | Norway | D | 1–1 | Kuwait City, Kuwait | Friendly |
| | 26 Jan 2005 | Syria | W | 3–2 | Kuwait City, Kuwait | Friendly |
| | 2 Feb 2005 | North Korea | D | 0–0 | Beijing, China | Friendly |
| | 9 Feb 2005 | South Korea | L | 0–2 | Seoul, South Korea | 2006 World Cup Qualifier |
| | 12 Mar 2005 | Finland | L | 0–1 | Kuwait City, Kuwait | Friendly |
| | 18 Mar 2005 | Armenia | W | 3–1 | Al Ain, United Arab Emirates | Friendly |
| | 25 Mar 2005 | Uzbekistan | W | 2–1 | Kuwait City, Kuwait | 2006 World Cup Qualifier |
| | 30 Mar 2005 | Saudi Arabia | D | 0–0 | Kuwait City, Kuwait | 2006 World Cup Qualifier |
| | 27 May 2005 | Egypt | L | 0–1 | Kuwait City, Kuwait | Friendly |
| | 3 Jun 2005 | Saudi Arabia | L | 0–3 | Riyadh, Saudi Arabia | 2006 World Cup Qualifier |
| | 8 Jun 2005 | South Korea | L | 0–4 | Kuwait City, Kuwait | 2006 World Cup Qualifier |
| | 29 Jul 2005 | United Arab Emirates | D | 1–1 | Geneva, Switzerland | Friendly |
| | 31 Jul 2005 | Qatar | L | 0–1 | Geneva, Switzerland | Friendly |
| | 17 Aug 2005 | Uzbekistan | L | 2–3 | Tashkent, Uzbekistan | 2006 World Cup Qualifier |
| | 26 Nov 2005 | Iraq | D | 0–0 | Kuwait City, Kuwait | Friendly |
| | 3 Feb 2006 | Singapore | D | 2–2 | Kuwait City, Kuwait | Friendly |
| | 7 Feb 2006 | Jordan | W | 2–1 | Kuwait City, Kuwait | Friendly |
| | 22 Feb 2006 | Lebanon | D | 1–1 | Beirut, Lebanon | 2007 Asian Cup Qualifier |
| | 1 Mar 2006 | Bahrain | D | 0–0 | Kuwait City, Kuwait | 2007 Asian Cup Qualifier |
| | 16 Aug 2006 | Australia | L | 0–2 | Sydney, Australia | 2007 Asian Cup Qualifier |
| | 6 Sep 2006 | Australia | W | 2–0 | Kuwait City, Kuwait | 2007 Asian Cup Qualifier |
| | 11 Oct 2006 | Lithuania | W | 1–0 | Kuwait City, Kuwait | Friendly |
| | 9 Nov 2006 | Chinese Taipei | W | 10–0 | Al Ain, United Arab Emirates | Friendly |
| | 15 Nov 2006 | Bahrain | L | 1–2 | Manama, Bahrain | 2007 Asian Cup Qualifier |
| | 17 Jan 2007 | Yemen | D | 1–1 | Abu Dhabi, United Arab Emirates | 18th Arabian Gulf Cup |
| | 20 Jan 2007 | Oman | L | 1–2 | Abu Dhabi, United Arab Emirates | 18th Arabian Gulf Cup |
| | 23 Jan 2007 | United Arab Emirates | L | 2–3 | Abu Dhabi, United Arab Emirates | 18th Arabian Gulf Cup |
| | 5 Jun 2007 | Portugal | D | 1–1 | Kuwait City, Kuwait | Friendly |
| | 12 Jun 2007 | Egypt | D | 1–1 | Kuwait City, Kuwait | Friendly |
| | 2 Jan 2008 | Lebanon | W | 3–2 | Kuwait City, Kuwait | Friendly |
| | 12 Jan 2008 | Ivory Coast | L | 0–2 | Kuwait City, Kuwait | Friendly |
| | 16 Jan 2008 | Bahrain | L | 0–1 | Riffa, Bahrain | Friendly |
| | 24 Jan 2008 | Singapore | L | 0–2 | Muscat, Oman | Friendly |
| | 31 Jan 2008 | Oman | D | 1–1 | Muscat, Oman | Friendly |
| | 2 Feb 2008 | United Arab Emirates | L | 0–2 | Abu Dhabi, United Arab Emirates | 2010 World Cup Qualifier |
| | 21 Mar 2008 | Iraq | D | 0–0 | Kuwait City, Kuwait | Friendly |
| | 26 Mar 2008 | Iran | D | 2–2 | Kuwait City, Kuwait | 2010 World Cup Qualifier |
| | 23 May 2008 | Qatar | D | 1–1 | Doha, Qatar | Friendly |
| | 27 May 2008 | Saudi Arabia | L | 1–2 | Dammam, Saudi Arabia | Friendly |
| | 2 Jun 2008 | Syria | L | 0–1 | Damascus, Syria | 2010 World Cup Qualifier |
| | 8 Jun 2008 | Syria | W | 4–2 | Al Salmiya, Kuwait | 2010 World Cup Qualifier |
| | 14 Jun 2008 | United Arab Emirates | L | 2–3 | Al Salmiya, Kuwait | 2010 World Cup Qualifier |
| | 22 Jun 2008 | Iran | L | 0–2 | Tehran, Iran | 2010 World Cup Qualifier |
| | 30 Dec 2008 | United Arab Emirates | D | 0–0 | Dubai, United Arab Emirates | Friendly |
| | 4 Jan 2009 | Oman | D | 0–0 | Muscat, Oman | 19th Arabian Gulf Cup |
| | 7 Jan 2009 | Bahrain | W | 1–0 | Muscat, Oman | 19th Arabian Gulf Cup |
| | 10 Jan 2009 | Iraq | D | 1–1 | Muscat, Oman | 19th Arabian Gulf Cup |
| | 14 Jan 2009 | Saudi Arabia | L | 0–1 | Muscat, Oman | 19th Arabian Gulf Cup |
| | 20 Jan 2009 | Turkmenistan | W | 2–0 | Kuwait City, Kuwait | Friendly |
| | 23 Jan 2009 | Syria | L | 2–3 | Kuwait City, Kuwait | Friendly |
| | 28 Jan 2009 | Oman | L | 0–1 | Kuwait City, Kuwait | 2011 Asian Cup Qualifier |
| | 5 Mar 2009 | Australia | W | 1–0 | Canberra, Australia | 2011 Asian Cup Qualifier |
| | 11 Feb 2009 | Azerbaijan | D | 1–1 | Kuwait City, Kuwait | Friendly |
| | 17 Mar 2009 | Qatar | L | 0–1 | Doha, Qatar | Friendly |
| | 23 Mar 2009 | Iran | L | 0–1 | Kuwait City, Kuwait | Friendly |
| | 31 May 2009 | Vietnam | L | 0–1 | Kuwait City, Kuwait | Friendly |
| | 5 Oct 2009 | Libya | D | 1–1 | Cairo, Egypt | Friendly |
| | 10 Oct 2009 | Jordan | W | 2–1 | Cairo, Egypt | Friendly |
| | 26 Oct 2009 | Syria | W | 1–0 | Al Jahra, Kuwait | Friendly |
| | 3 Nov 2009 | Kenya | W | 5–0 | Cairo, Egypt | Friendly |
| | 8 Nov 2009 | China | D | 2–2 | Kuwait City, Kuwait | Friendly |
| | 14 Nov 2009 | Indonesia | W | 2–1 | Kuwait City, Kuwait | 2011 Asian Cup Qualifier |
| | 18 Nov 2009 | Indonesia | D | 1–1 | Jakarta, Indonesia | 2011 Asian Cup Qualifier |
| | 16 Dec 2009 | United Arab Emirates | D | 0–0 | Kuwait City, Kuwait | Friendly |

== 2010s ==
Win Draw Loss

| # | Date | Opponent | Result | Score | Venue | Competition |
|---|---|---|---|---|---|---|
| | 6 Jan 2010 | Australia | D | 2–2 | Kuwait City, Kuwait | 2011 Asian Cup Qualifier |
| | 19 Feb 2010 | Syria | D | 1–1 | Al Ain, United Arab Emirates | Friendly |
| | 25 Feb 2010 | Bahrain | W | 4–1 | Al Ain, United Arab Emirates | Friendly |
| | 3 Mar 2010 | Oman | D | 0–0 | Muscat, Oman | 2011 Asian Cup Qualifier |
| | 11 Aug 2010 | Azerbaijan | D | 1–1 | Baku, Azerbaijan | Friendly |
| | 3 Sep 2010 | Syria | W | 3–0 | Kuwait City, Kuwait | Friendly |
| | 7 Sep 2010 | United Arab Emirates | L | 0–3 | Abu Dhabi, United Arab Emirates | Friendly |
| | 26 Sep 2010 | Syria | W | 2–1 | Amman, Jordan | 2010 WAFF Championship |
| | 28 Sep 2010 | Jordan | D | 2–2 | Amman, Jordan | 2010 WAFF Championship |
| | 1 Oct 2010 | Yemen | D | 1–1 | Amman, Jordan | 2010 WAFF Championship |
| | 3 Oct 2010 | Iran | W | 2–1 | Amman, Jordan | 2010 WAFF Championship |
| | 8 Oct 2010 | Bahrain | L | 1–3 | Kuwait City, Kuwait | Friendly |
| | 12 Oct 2010 | Vietnam | W | 3–1 | Kuwait City, Kuwait | Friendly |
| | 14 Nov 2010 | India | W | 9–1 | Abu Dhabi, United Arab Emirates | Friendly |
| | 17 Nov 2010 | Iraq | D | 1–1 | Abu Dhabi, United Arab Emirates | Friendly |
| | 22 Nov 2010 | Qatar | W | 1–0 | Aden, Yemen | 20th Arabian Gulf Cup |
| | 25 Nov 2010 | Saudi Arabia | D | 0–0 | Zinjibar, Yemen | 20th Arabian Gulf Cup |
| | 28 Nov 2010 | Yemen | W | 3–0 | Zinjibar, Yemen | 20th Arabian Gulf Cup |
| | 2 Dec 2010 | Iraq | D | 2–2 | Aden, Yemen | 20th Arabian Gulf Cup |
| | 5 Dec 2010 | Saudi Arabia | W | 1–0 | Aden, Yemen | 20th Arabian Gulf Cup |
| | 24 Dec 2010 | North Korea | W | 2–1 | 6th of October City, Egypt | Friendly |
| | 27 Dec 2010 | North Korea | D | 2–2 | 6th of October City, Egypt | Friendly |
| | 31 Dec 2010 | Zambia | W | 4–0 | Suez, Egypt | Friendly |
| | 8 Jan 2011 | China | L | 0–2 | Doha, Qatar | 2011 Asian Cup |
| | 12 Jan 2011 | Uzbekistan | L | 1–2 | Doha, Qatar | 2011 Asian Cup |
| | 16 Jan 2011 | Qatar | L | 0–3 | Doha, Qatar | 2011 Asian Cup |
| | 14 Feb 2011 | Bahrain | D | 0–0 | Riffa, Bahrain | Friendly |
| | 26 Mar 2011 | Jordan | D | 1–1 | Sharjah, United Arab Emirates | Friendly |
| | 29 Mar 2011 | Iraq | W | 1–0 | Sharjah, United Arab Emirates | Friendly |
| | 2 Jul 2011 | Lebanon | W | 6–0 | Beirut, Lebanon | Friendly |
| | 6 Jul 2011 | Oman | D | 1–1 | Beirut, Lebanon | Friendly |
| | 13 Jul 2011 | Iraq | W | 2–0 | Amman, Jordan | Friendly |
| | 16 Jul 2011 | Saudi Arabia | W | 1–0 | Amman, Jordan | Friendly |
| | 23 Jul 2011 | Philippines | W | 3–0 | Kuwait City, Kuwait | 2014 World Cup Qualifier |
| | 28 Jul 2011 | Philippines | W | 2–1 | Manila, Philippines | 2014 World Cup Qualifier |
| | 10 Aug 2011 | North Korea | D | 0–0 | Kuwait City, Kuwait | Friendly |
| | 27 Aug 2011 | Oman | L | 0–1 | Muscat, Oman | Friendly |
| | 2 Sep 2011 | United Arab Emirates | W | 3–2 | Al Ain, United Arab Emirates | 2014 World Cup Qualifier |
| | 6 Sep 2011 | South Korea | D | 1–1 | Kuwait City, Kuwait | 2014 World Cup Qualifier |
| | 11 Oct 2011 | Lebanon | D | 2–2 | Beirut, Lebanon | 2014 World Cup Qualifier |
| | 4 Nov 2011 | Bahrain | L | 0–1 | Kuwait City, Kuwait | Friendly |
| | 11 Nov 2011 | Lebanon | L | 0–1 | Kuwait City, Kuwait | 2014 World Cup Qualifier |
| | 15 Nov 2011 | United Arab Emirates | W | 2–1 | Kuwait City, Kuwait | 2014 World Cup Qualifier |
| | 14 Dec 2011 | Oman | W | 2–0 | Al Rayyan, Qatar | 2011 Pan Arab Games |
| | 17 Dec 2011 | Saudi Arabia | W | 2–0 | Al Rayyan, Qatar | 2011 Pan Arab Games |
| | 20 Dec 2011 | Jordan | L | 0–2 | Doha, Qatar | 2011 Pan Arab Games |
| | 22 Dec 2011 | Palestine | W | 3–0 | Doha, Qatar | 2011 Pan Arab Games |
| | 17 Jan 2012 | Uzbekistan | W | 1–0 | Kuwait City, Kuwait | Friendly |
| | 17 Feb 2012 | North Korea | D | 1–1 | Changsha, China | Friendly |
| | 29 Feb 2012 | South Korea | L | 0–2 | Seoul, South Korea | 2014 World Cup Qualifier |
| | 22 Jun 2012 | Saudi Arabia | L | 0–4 | Ta'if, Saudi Arabia | 2012 Arab Nations Cup |
| | 25 Jun 2012 | Palestine | W | 2–0 | Ta'if, Saudi Arabia | 2012 Arab Nations Cup |
| | 7 Sep 2012 | Uzbekistan | L | 0–3 | Tashkent, Uzbekistan | Friendly |
| | 11 Sep 2012 | United Arab Emirates | L | 0–3 | Dubai, United Arab Emirates | Friendly |
| | 16 Oct 2012 | Philippines | W | 2–1 | Kuwait City, Kuwait | Friendly |
| | 14 Nov 2012 | Bahrain | D | 1–1 | Kuwait City, Kuwait | Friendly |
| | 8 Dec 2012 | Palestine | W | 2–1 | Kuwait City, Kuwait | 2012 WAFF Championship |
| | 11 Dec 2012 | Oman | L | 0–2 | Kuwait City, Kuwait | 2012 WAFF Championship |
| | 14 Dec 2012 | Lebanon | W | 2–1 | Kuwait City, Kuwait | 2012 WAFF Championship |
| | 6 Jan 2013 | Yemen | W | 2–0 | Isa Town, Bahrain | 21st Arabian Gulf Cup |
| | 9 Jan 2013 | Iraq | L | 0–1 | Isa Town, Bahrain | 21st Arabian Gulf Cup |
| | 12 Jan 2013 | Saudi Arabia | W | 1–0 | Riffa, Bahrain | 21st Arabian Gulf Cup |
| | 15 Jan 2013 | United Arab Emirates | L | 0–1 | Riffa, Bahrain | 21st Arabian Gulf Cup |
| | 18 Jan 2013 | Bahrain | W | 6–1 | Riffa, Bahrain | 21st Arabian Gulf Cup |
| | 6 Feb 2013 | Thailand | W | 3–1 | Bangkok, Thailand | 2015 Asian Cup Qualifier |
| | 21 Mar 2013 | Palestine | W | 2–1 | Kuwait City, Kuwait | Friendly |
| | 26 Mar 2013 | Iran | D | 1–1 | Kuwait City, Kuwait | 2015 Asian Cup Qualifier |
| | 6 Jun 2013 | Hungary | L | 0–1 | Győr, Hungary | Friendly |
| | 6 Sep 2013 | North Korea | W | 2–1 | Kuwait City, Kuwait | Friendly |
| | 9 Sep 2013 | Bahrain | W | 2–1 | Kuwait City, Kuwait | Friendly |
| | 9 Oct 2013 | Jordan | D | 1–1 | Amman, Jordan | Friendly |
| | 15 Oct 2013 | Lebanon | D | 1–1 | Beirut, Lebanon | 2015 Asian Cup Qualifier |
| | 8 Nov 2013 | Malaysia | W | 3–0 | Kuwait City, Kuwait | Friendly |
| | 15 Nov 2013 | Lebanon | D | 0–0 | Kuwait City, Kuwait | 2015 Asian Cup Qualifier |
| | 19 Nov 2013 | Thailand | W | 3–1 | Kuwait City, Kuwait | 2015 Asian Cup Qualifier |
| | 29 Dec 2013 | Lebanon | W | 2–0 | Doha, Qatar | 2014 WAFF Championship |
| | 1 Jan 2014 | Jordan | L | 1–2 | Doha, Qatar | 2014 WAFF Championship |
| | 4 Jan 2014 | Qatar | L | 0–3 | Doha, Qatar | 2014 WAFF Championship |
| | 7 Jan 2014 | Bahrain | D | 0–0 | Doha, Qatar | 2014 WAFF Championship |
| | 3 Mar 2014 | Iran | L | 2–3 | Karaj, Iran | 2015 Asian Cup Qualifier |
| | 14 May 2014 | Afghanistan | W | 3–2 | Kuwait City, Kuwait | Friendly |
| | 16 May 2014 | Kyrgyzstan | D | 2–2 | Kuwait City, Kuwait | Friendly |
| | 25 May 2014 | Thailand | D | 1–1 | Bangkok, Thailand | Friendly |
