= Kuwait at the 1996 Summer Olympics =

- IOC code: KUW
- NOC: Kuwait Olympic Committee
- Website: www.kuwaitolympic.net (in Arabic and English)

in Atlanta
- Competitors: 25 in 9 sports
- Flag bearer: Abdullah Al-Rashidi
- Medals: Gold 0 Silver 0 Bronze 0 Total 0

Summer Olympics appearances (overview)
- 1968; 1972; 1976; 1980; 1984; 1988; 1992; 1996; 2000; 2004; 2008; 2012; 2016; 2020; 2024

Other related appearances
- Independent Olympic Athletes (2016)

Kuwait competed at the 1996 Summer Olympics in Atlanta, United States. 25 competitors, all men, took part in 16 events in 9 sports.

== Diving ==
Men

Athlete	Event	Preliminary		Semifinal		Final	
Athlete	Event	Points	Rank	Points	Rank	Points	Rank
Ali Al-Hasan	3 m springboard	272.40	33	Did not advance			

== Fencing ==
One fencer represented Kuwait in 1996.

Men's foil

- Abdulmohsen Shahrayen

== Handball ==
Roster

- Abbas Al-Harbi
- Abdul Ridha Al-Boloushi
- Adel Al-Kahham
- Bandar Al-Shammari
- Ismael Shah Al-Zadah
- Khaldoun Al-Khashti
- Khaled Al-Mulla
- Mishal Al-Ali
- Naser Al-Otaibi
- Qaied Al-Adwani
- Salah Al-Marzouq
- Salem Al-Marzouq

== Judo ==
- Mohamed Bu Sakher - Men's 95 kg
- Saleh Al-Sharrah - Men's 71 kg

== Swimming ==
Men

Athlete	Event	Heat		Final	
Athlete	Event	Time	Rank	Time	Rank
Thamer Al-Shamroukh	200 m freestyle	2:13.75	43	Did not advance	
Fahad Al-Otaibi	100 m backstroke	1:04.27	49	Did not advance	
Fahad Al-Otaibi	200 m backstroke	DNS		Did not advance	
Sultan Al-Otaibi	100 m breaststroke	1:12.65	45	Did not advance	
Sultan Al-Otaibi	200 m individual medley	2:19.77	37	Did not advance	

== Weightlifting ==
- Yaqoub Abu Erejaib
