= Kuwait at the 1976 Summer Olympics =

- IOC code: KUW
- NOC: Kuwait Olympic Committee

in Montreal, Canada
- Competitors: 15 in 4 sports
- Medals: Gold 0 Silver 0 Bronze 0 Total 0

Summer Olympics appearances (overview)
- 1968; 1972; 1976; 1980; 1984; 1988; 1992; 1996; 2000; 2004; 2008; 2012; 2016; 2020; 2024; 2028

Other related appearances
- Independent Olympic Athletes (2016)

Kuwait competed at the 1976 Summer Olympics in Montreal, Quebec, Canada. 15 competitors, all men, took part in 13 events in 4 sports.

== Athletics ==
Men's 100m

- Abdulkareem Alawad

- Heats — 11.27s (→ did not advance)

Men's 400m Hurdles

- Abdlatef Abbas Hashem

- Heats — 53.06s (→ did not advance)

Men's 4×100 metres Relay

- Abdulaziz Abdulkareem, Abdulkareem Alawad, Ibraheem Alrabee, and Abdlatef Abbas Hashem

- Heat — 41.61s (→ did not advance)

== Diving ==
Men

Athlete	Event	Preliminary		Final	
Athlete	Event	Points	Rank	Points	Rank
Jamal Al-Ghareeb	3 m springboard	DNS		Did not advance	
Sulaiman Qabazard	3 m springboard	216.93	27	Did not advance	
Jamal Al-Ghareeb	10 m platform	DNS		Did not advance	

== Fencing ==
Four fencers represented Kuwait in 1976.

Men's foil

- Jamal Ameen
- Abdul Nasser Al-Sayegh
- Ahmed Al-Arbeed

Men's team foil

- Ahmed Al-Arbeed, Jamal Ameen, Ali Al-Khawajah, Abdul Nasser Al-Sayegh
