= Kuwait national football team results (1980–1999) =

This article provides details of international football games played by the Kuwait national football team from 1980 to 1999.

== Results ==
Key
Win
Draw
Defeat

=== 1980 ===
8 March 1980 Friendly	Kuwait	1–1	Bulgaria

17 March 1980 Friendly	Kuwait	1–0	Syria

22 March 1980 Friendly	Kuwait	5–1	South Yemen

26 March 1980 Friendly	Iraq	0–0	Kuwait

29 March 1980 Friendly	Kuwait	1–0	Jordan

31 March 1980 Friendly	Iraq	2–3	Kuwait

21 July 1980 Friendly	Kuwait	3–1	Nigeria

15 September 1980 1980 Asian Cup	Kuwait	1–1	United Arab Emirates	Kuwait City, Kuwait

18 September 1980 1980 Asian Cup	Kuwait	3–1	Malaysia	Kuwait City, Kuwait

21 September 1980 1980 Asian Cup	Kuwait	0–3	South Korea	Kuwait City, Kuwait

25 September 1980 1980 Asian Cup	Kuwait	4–0	Qatar	Kuwait City, Kuwait

28 September 1980 1980 Asian Cup	Kuwait	2–1	Iran	Kuwait City, Kuwait

30 September 1980 1980 Asian Cup	Kuwait	3–0	South Korea	Kuwait City, Kuwait

16 October 1980 Merdeka Tournament	New Zealand	5–1	Kuwait	Malaysia

19 October 1980 Merdeka Tournament	Indonesia	2–1	Kuwait	Malaysia

21 October 1980 Merdeka Tournament	South Korea	3–0	Kuwait	Malaysia

24 October 1980 Merdeka Tournament	Thailand	1–0	Kuwait	Malaysia

27 October 1980 Merdeka Tournament	Malaysia	2–1	Kuwait	Malaysia

29 October 1980 Merdeka Tournament	Kuwait	3–1	Burma	Malaysia

31 October 1980 Merdeka Tournament	Morocco	3–0	Kuwait	Malaysia

=== 1981 ===
1981 Friendly	Kuwait	6–0	Thailand

1981 Friendly	Kuwait	4–0	Malaysia

1981 Friendly	Kuwait	2–0	South Korea

8 September 1981	Benfica (Portugal)	2–0	Kuwait	Lisbon
	Nené 21'; Carlos Manuel 42'			Stadium: Estádio da Luz; Referee: António Ferreira

1981 Friendly	New Zealand	1–2	Kuwait

1981 Friendly	China	3–0	Kuwait

1981 Friendly	Saudi Arabia	0–1	Kuwait

1981 Friendly	Kuwait	1–0	China

1981 Friendly	Kuwait	2–0	Saudi Arabia

1981 Friendly	Kuwait	2–2	New Zealand

=== 1982 ===
14 March 1982 Friendly	Kuwait	0–0	Iceland	Kuwait

20 March 1982 1982 Gulf Cup	Kuwait	2–0	Bahrain	United Arab Emirates

24 March 1982 1982 Gulf Cup	United Arab Emirates	0–2	Kuwait	United Arab Emirates

26 March 1982 1982 Gulf Cup	Kuwait	1–0	Saudi Arabia	United Arab Emirates

29 March 1982 1982 Gulf Cup	Kuwait	2–0	Oman	United Arab Emirates

4 April 1982 1982 Gulf Cup	Qatar	2–1	Kuwait	United Arab Emirates

1982 Friendly	Morocco	3–3	Kuwait	Morocco

25 May 1982 Friendly	Kuwait	1–2	(Germany) Eintracht Frankfurt	Casablanca, Morocco
	75'		Nickel 40'; Anthes 62'	Attendance: 4,000

1982 Friendly	Czechoslovakia	1–1	Kuwait

1982 1982 World Cup	France	4–1	Kuwait	Spain

1982 1982 World Cup	England	1–0	Kuwait	Spain

1982 Friendly	Kuwait	0–1	Iraq	Kuwait

1982 Friendly	Morocco	1–0	Norway	Kuwait

1982 Friendly	Kuwait	3–1	Nepal	India

1982 Friendly	Kuwait	4–0	Burma	India

1982 Friendly	Kuwait	2–1	Iraq	India

1982 Friendly	Kuwait	1–0	Iran	India

1982 Friendly	Kuwait	3–2	North Korea	India

1982 Friendly	Iraq	1–0	Kuwait	India

=== 1983 ===
1983 Friendly	Kuwait	3–0	Jordan

1983 Friendly	Kuwait	2–2	Qatar

1983 Friendly	Syria	1–3	Kuwait

1983 Friendly	Jordan	0–2	Kuwait

1983 Friendly	Qatar	0–0	Kuwait

1983 Friendly	Kuwait	1–3	Syria

=== 1984 ===
1984 Friendly	Kuwait	1–0	Finland

1984 Friendly	United Arab Emirates	2–0	Kuwait

1984 Friendly	Kuwait	1–0	Bahrain

1984 Friendly	Kuwait	1–2	East Germany

1984 Friendly	Qatar	2–1	Kuwait

1984 Friendly	Kuwait	1–1	Saudi Arabia

1984 Friendly	Iraq	3–1	Kuwait

1984 Friendly	Oman	0–0	Kuwait

1984 Friendly	Kuwait	1–1	Bulgaria

1984 Friendly	Kuwait	2–0	Bahrain

1984 Friendly	Kuwait	0–0	South Korea

1984 Friendly	Kuwait	2–0	New Zealand

1984 Friendly	Saudi Arabia	4–1	Kuwait

1984 Friendly	Kuwait	1–0	Qatar

1984 Friendly	Kuwait	0–0	South Korea

1984 Friendly	Kuwait	3–1	Syria

1984 Friendly	Saudi Arabia	1–0	Kuwait

1984 Friendly	China	1–0	Kuwait

1984 Friendly	Iran	1–1	Kuwait

=== 1985 ===
1985 Friendly	Syria	1–0	Kuwait

1985 Friendly	Kuwait	1–1	Iceland

1985 Friendly	Kuwait	5–0	North Yemen

1985 Friendly	Kuwait	0–0	Syria

1985 Friendly	North Yemen	1–3	Kuwait

1985 Friendly	Kuwait	0–0	Mexico

=== 1986 ===
1986 Friendly	Kuwait	1–0	Iceland

1986 Friendly	Kuwait	3–1	Saudi Arabia

1986 Friendly	Kuwait	2–0	Oman

1986 Friendly	Kuwait	1–0	United Arab Emirates

1986 Friendly	Kuwait	2–1	Qatar

1986 Friendly	Kuwait	2–1	Iraq

1986 Friendly	Bahrain	1–1	Kuwait

1986 Friendly	Kuwait	4–0	Bangladesh

1986 Friendly	Kuwait	5–0	Nepal

1986 Friendly	Kuwait	2–0	Japan

1986 Friendly	Kuwait	1–0	Iran

1986 Friendly	China	1–1	Kuwait

1986 Friendly	Kuwait	2–2	Saudi Arabia

1986 Friendly	Kuwait	5–0	Indonesia

=== 1987 ===
1987 Friendly	Kuwait	2–0	Algeria

1987 Friendly	Kuwait	2–0	Iraq

1987 Friendly	Kuwait	1–1	Iceland

1987 Friendly	Iran	2–1	Kuwait

1987 Friendly	Kuwait	0–1	Iceland

1987 Friendly	Kuwait	1–0	Iran

1987 Friendly	Kuwait	0–2	Egypt

1987 Friendly	Qatar	0–0	Kuwait

1987 Friendly	Kuwait	1–0	Saudi Arabia

1987 Friendly	Kuwait	2–1	Iraq

1987 Friendly	Kuwait	0–1	Tunisia

=== 1988 ===
1988 Friendly	Kuwait	0–0	Qatar

1988 Friendly	Saudi Arabia	0–0	Kuwait

1988 Friendly	Iraq	1–0	Kuwait

19 October 1988	Benfica (Portugal)	2–1	Kuwait	Lisbon
	Lima 19'; Pacheco 74' (pen.)		Fahed Kameel 78'	Stadium: Estádio da Luz; Referee: António Marçal

1988 Friendly	Kuwait	1–1	Qatar

1988 Friendly	United Arab Emirates	1–0	Kuwait

1988 Friendly	Iraq	1–0	Kuwait

1988 Friendly	Bahrain	1–0	Kuwait

1988 Friendly	Kuwait	2–0	Oman

1988 Friendly	Saudi Arabia	0–0	Kuwait

1988 Friendly	Kuwait	1–0	Japan

1988 Friendly	Jordan	0–0	Kuwait

1988 Friendly	Kuwait	3–0	Pakistan

1988 Friendly	Malaysia	0–5	Kuwait

1988 Friendly	Jordan	0–1	Kuwait

1988 Friendly	Syria	1–0	Kuwait

1988 Friendly	Bahrain	1–1	Kuwait

1988 Friendly	Kuwait	0–0	Finland

1988 Friendly	Kuwait	0–0	Finland

1988 Friendly	Kuwait	2–2	Egypt

1988 Friendly	Kuwait	0–1	Soviet Union

1988 Friendly	Bahrain	0–0	Kuwait

1988 Friendly	Kuwait	0–0	Saudi Arabia

1988 Friendly	Syria	1–0	Kuwait

1988 Friendly	China	2–2	Kuwait

=== 1989 ===
1988 Friendly	Pakistan	0–1	Kuwait

1988 Friendly	Kuwait	3–2	United Arab Emirates

=== 1996 ===
23 February 1996 Friendly	Ecuador	3–0	Kuwait

24 February 1996 Friendly	Kuwait	1–0	Oman

2 March 1996 Friendly	Oman	0–3	Kuwait

5 March 1996 Friendly	Syria	0–2	Kuwait

10 March 1996 Friendly	Turkmenistan	2–2	Kuwait

16 March 1996 Friendly	Kuwait	0–1	Finland	Kuwait

22 March 1996 Friendly	Kuwait	2–0	Turkmenistan	Kuwait

21 April 1996 Friendly	Qatar	3–1	Kuwait

23 May 1996 Friendly	Kuwait	3–1	Syria

1996 Friendly	Lebanon	3–5	Kuwait

1996 Friendly	Kuwait	0–0	Lebanon

1996 Friendly	Kuwait	0–1	Iran

1996 Friendly	Cyprus	1–1	Kuwait

1996 Friendly	Kuwait	1–0	Bahrain

1996 Friendly	Oman	1–2	Kuwait

1996 Friendly	United Arab Emirates	2–1	Kuwait

1996 Friendly	Kuwait	1–0	Saudi Arabia

1996 Friendly	Kuwait	2–1	Qatar

1996 Friendly	Kuwait	2–2	Syria

1996 Friendly	Kuwait	4–2	Mali

1996 Friendly	Indonesia	2–2	Kuwait

1996 Friendly	United Arab Emirates	3–2	Kuwait

1996 Friendly	Kuwait	2–0	South Korea

1996 Friendly	Kuwait	2–0	Japan

1996 Friendly	United Arab Emirates	1–0	Kuwait

1996 Friendly	Iran	1–1	Kuwait

=== 1997 ===
1997 Friendly	Kuwait	2–0	Egypt

1997 Friendly	Kuwait	3–1	Bahrain

1997 Friendly	Kuwait	0–2	Iran

1997 Friendly	Thailand	3–1	Kuwait

1997 Friendly	Singapore	0–1	Kuwait

1997 Friendly	Kuwait	2–0	Lebanon

1997 Friendly	Kuwait	2–1	Zambia

1997 Friendly	Kuwait	4–0	Singapore

1997 Friendly	Lebanon	1–3	Kuwait

1997 Friendly	Saudi Arabia	2–1	Kuwait

1997 Friendly	Qatar	0–2	Kuwait

1997 Friendly	China	1–1	Iran

1997 Friendly	Kuwait	8–1	Mali

1997 Friendly	Kuwait	1–2	China

1997 Friendly	Kuwait	2–1	Saudi Arabia

1997 Friendly	Kuwait	0–1	Qatar

1997 Friendly	Iran	0–0	Kuwait

1997 Friendly	China	1–0	Kuwait

=== 1998 ===
1998 Friendly	Iran	1–1	Kuwait

1998 Friendly	United States	2–0	Kuwait

1998 Friendly	Kuwait	0–0	Lebanon

1998 Friendly	Kuwait	4–0	North Korea

1998 Friendly	Kuwait	4–0	Syria

1998 Friendly	Saudi Arabia	2–1	Kuwait

1998 Friendly	Kuwait	4–1	United Arab Emirates

1998 Friendly	Kuwait	3–0	Iran

1998 Friendly	Cyprus	5–3	Kuwait

31 October 1998 1998 Gulf Cup	Saudi Arabia	2–1	Kuwait	Bahrain

2 November 1998 1998 Gulf Cup	Kuwait	6–2	Qatar	Bahrain

6 November 1998 1998 Gulf Cup	Bahrain	0–2	Kuwait	Bahrain

9 November 1998 1998 Gulf Cup	Kuwait	5–0	Oman	Bahrain

12 November 1998 1998 Gulf Cup	Kuwait	4–1	United Arab Emirates	Bahrain

1 December 1998 1998 Asian Games	Mongolia	0–11	Kuwait	Chiang Mai, Thailand
				Stadium: 700th Anniversary Stadium

3 December 1998 1998 Asian Games	Uzbekistan	3–3	Kuwait	Chiang Mai, Thailand
				Stadium: 700th Anniversary Stadium

7 December 1998 1998 Asian Games	United Arab Emirates	0–5	Kuwait	Bangkok, Thailand
				Stadium: Rajamangala Stadium

9 December 1998 1998 Asian Games	Japan	2–1	Kuwait	Bangkok, Thailand
				Stadium: Rajamangala Stadium

11 December 1998 1998 Asian Games	South Korea	1–0	Kuwait	Bangkok, Thailand
				Stadium: Rajamangala Stadium

14 December 1998 1998 Asian Games	Qatar	0–0 (a.e.t.) (1–3 p)	Kuwait	Bangkok, Thailand
				Stadium: Rajamangala Stadium

16 December 1998 1998 Asian Games	Thailand	0–3	Kuwait	Bangkok, Thailand
				Stadium: Rajamangala Stadium

19 December 1998 1998 Asian Games	Iran	2–0	Kuwait	Bangkok, Thailand
				Stadium: Rajamangala Stadium

27 December 1998 Friendly	Kuwait	1–1	Egypt	Kuwait

=== 1999 ===
1999 Friendly	Kuwait	0–1	Iran
