= Sport in Kuwait =

Association football is the most popular sport in Kuwait, followed by basketball and cricket. Additional sports on the rise in Kuwait include powerboating, handball, field hockey, rugby union, and shooting.

== Football (Soccer) ==
The Kuwait Football Association (KFA) is the governing body of football in Kuwait. The KFA organises the men's, women's, and futsal national teams. The men's team has gained limited success at the sport, with the national team having competed at eight AFC Asian Cup competitions, and one FIFA World Cup, in 1982. The Kuwaiti Premier League is the top league of Kuwaiti football, featuring eighteen teams. Kuwait is home to many football clubs including Al-Arabi, Al-Fahaheel, Al-Jahra, Al-Kuwait, Al-Naser, Al-Salmiya, Al-Shabab, Al Qadsia, Al-Yarmouk, Kazma, Khaitan, Sulaibikhat, Sahel, and Tadamon. Kuwait is one of Asia's most successful footballing nations. They have been the champions of the 1980 AFC Asian Cup, runners-up of the 1976 AFC Asian Cup, and have taken third place of the 1984 AFC Asian Cup. Kuwait has also been to one FIFA World Cup, in 1982, but didn't win a single match, but tied 1–1 with Czechoslovakia on the first round.

== Basketball ==
Basketball is one of Kuwait's most popular sports. Basketball in Kuwait is governed by the Kuwait Basketball Association (KBA). The national team has never been to a Basketball World Championship (FIBA), and the national team has also never been to an Olympic Games in basketball, but the national team has been to the FIBA Asian Championship in basketball eleven times, but did not win any medals. Kuwait is one of the most successful basketballing nations in the Middle East. Abdullah Al-Saraf is one of the best and most famous Kuwaiti basketballers. He currently plays for Al-Qadsia in Kuwait.

== Cricket ==
In cricket, Kuwait has been an associate member of the International Cricket Council since 2005, having previously been an affiliate member since 1998. They are currently ranked at tenth amongst non-test teams in Asia. In recent years, the popularity of cricket has been constantly rising. In several years it may even be one of Kuwait's best-known sports.

== Aquabike ==
In recent years powerboating has risen in popularity in Kuwait, due in part to the achievements of Kuwaiti Yousef Al Abdulrazzaq, an Aquabike rider competing in Runabout GP1 who became World Champion in 2013, 2016, 2017, and 2020. In February 2020 Kuwait held for the first time a leg of the UIM Aquabike World Championship.

== Handball ==
The Kuwait men's national handball team is controlled by the Kuwait Handball Association. It is highly regarded as one of the most successful national handball teams in Asia and the Arab World. Kuwait has enjoyed great handball success at both the national and club level. The sport is widely considered to be the national icon of Kuwait, although football is more popular among the overall population. Kuwait is also the founding member of the Asian Handball Federation, the Asian Championship and Club Champions League.

== Hockey ==
Hockey in Kuwait is governed by the Kuwait Ice Hockey Association. Kuwait first joined the International Ice Hockey Federation in 1985, but was expelled in 1992 due to a lack of ice hockey activity. Kuwait was re-admitted into the IIHF in May 2009. In 2015, Kuwait won the IIHF Challenge Cup of Asia.

== Shooting ==
Shooting is one of the most successful sports for Kuwait in World Championships, having a total of 20 medals (including seven golds) in senior World Championships organised by ISSF. All of the medals were won at shotgun male events and Kuwait has medals in all shotgun disciplines (Skeet, Trap and Double trap) both individual and team. All three of Kuwait's medals in the history of Olympics were won by Fehaid Al-Deehani in shooting events, although he won his only gold in 2016 while representing the IOC, as Kuwait had been banned to compete as a sovereign state.

== Suspension ==
For many years, Kuwait was suspended from participating in international sports due to undue government interference and corruption. Since 2007, Kuwait has been suspended by FIFA three times for "political interference" and were allowed to participate in the 2011 Asian Cup qualifying campaign and other international competitions on a provisional basis. Contrary to the road map established by FIFA and the AFC, the Al Sabah ruling family continued to interfere in sport elections. Elections were held on 9 October 2007 in direct violation of the FIFA Executive Committee's May 2007 decision to the contrary. As a consequence, the committee recommended to the FIFA Executive Committee that the Kuwait Football Association be unsuspended. Kuwait's football federation board resigned days after world governing body FIFA unsuspended Kuwait. The suspension was lifted after the federation said it will ratify new statutes to prevent government interference in the sport as demanded by FIFA. "Otherwise FIFA will immediately suspend the (federation) again," FIFA said in a statement. The suspension was conditionally lifted and extended by the FIFA Congress in June 2009. FIFA was closely monitoring the situation within Kuwait.

The International Olympic Committee imposed a suspension on the Kuwait committee with effect from 1 January 2010 due to Kuwaiti government legislation that permits the state to interfere in elections of sporting organizations. The government had failed to meet the IOC's 31 December 2009 deadline for amending the legislation. As a result, Kuwait was barred from receiving IOC funding and Kuwaiti athletes and officials were banned from Olympic Games and Olympic meetings.

At the 2010 Summer Youth Olympics, the 2010 Asian Games, and the 2011 Asian Winter Games, Kuwaiti athletes competed as independent athletes in a team named "Athletes from Kuwait" (code: IOC) under the Olympic flag. On 14 July 2012 the suspension was lifted and Kuwaiti athletes were allowed to participate in the 2012 Summer Olympics under their own flag.

On 16 October 2015, FIFA suspended Kuwait and all remaining results from AFC Asian Cup and FIFA World Cup qualification were added as forfeits while all Kuwaiti teams that were participating in international competitions were withdrawn. Kuwait tried to get the suspension lifted at the 66th FIFA Congress but this was rejected and therefore from the earlier announcement on 27 April 2016, the hosting of the Arabian Gulf Cup tournament was moved to Qatar. The suspension was eventually lifted on 6 December 2017 after Kuwait's adoption of a new sports law.

The Kuwait Olympic Committee was again suspended on 27 October 2015 by the IOC to protect the Olympic movement in Kuwait from undue Kuwaiti government interference and corruption. As a result of this suspension, participation by athletes from Kuwait at the 2016 Summer Olympics in Rio de Janeiro was allowed by the IOC in a special team named "Independent Olympic Athletes" (code: IOA) under the Olympic flag. In response to the Olympics suspension, Kuwait filed a $1 billion lawsuit against the IOC. The Kuwaiti government responded to the Olympics suspension in an official press release:

It's totally unacceptable that Kuwait is treated in this unfair way and barred from international sports activities without any appropriate probe being conducted. From the very beginning Kuwait did it its utmost to prevent the IOC suspension and showed a sincere desire to co-operate, but all to no avail. We sent a UN-sponsored delegation to Geneva to explain to the sports body that the Kuwaiti government by no means intervenes in sports activities. Kuwait has been left in an embarrassing position in sports circles where it is viewed as an outlaw.
