= Abdulaziz Al-Shatti =

Kuwaiti fencer

Abdulaziz Alshatti
- Born: 30 October 1990 (age 34); Kuwait
- Nationality: Kuwaiti

Sport
- Country: Independent Olympic Athletes team

Abdulaziz Alshatti (born 30 October 1990) is a Kuwaiti fencer who competed in the Épée Individual the 2016 Summer Olympics, and had a record of 0-1. He participated within the Independent Olympic Athletes team rather than for Kuwait, as the Kuwait Olympic Committee had been suspended by the International Olympic Committee (IOC) for the second time in five years due to governmental interference.
