= Obeid Al-Dosari =

Saudi Arabian footballer

Personal information
- Full name: Obeid Al-Dosari
- Date of birth: 2 October 1975 (age 51)
- Place of birth: Mecca, Saudi Arabia
- Height: 1.74 m (5 ft 8 1/2 in)
- Position: Forward

Senior career*
Years	Team	Apps	(Gls)
1993–2000	Al Wehda	180	(122)
2000–2005	Al-Ahli	88	(50)
2005–2007	Damac F.C.	56	(28)
Total		324	(200)

International career
1994–2002	Saudi Arabia	94	(41)
- * Club domestic league appearances and goals

Obeid Al-Dosari (Arabic: عُبَيْد الدَّوْسَرِيّ; born 2 October 1975) is a Saudi Arabian former football player who played most of his career for Al Wehda and Al-Ahli.

He played for the Saudi Arabia national football team and was a participant at the 1998 FIFA World Cup and at the 2002 FIFA World Cup. Al-Dosari also played at the 1996 Summer Olympics.

== International career ==
=== International goals ===
Scores and results list saudi Arabia's goal tally first.

#	Date	Venue	Opponent	Result	Competition	Scored
1	5 January 1996	Jeddah, Saudi Arabia	Ghana	1–1	Friendly	1
2	3 October 1996	Khobar, Saudi Arabia	New Zealand	2–0	Friendly	1
3, 4	9 March 1997	Singapore	Indonesia	4–0	Friendly	2
5	16 March 1997	Kuala Lumpur, Malaysia	Chinese Taipei	2–0	1998 World Cup qualifier	1
6	27 March 1997	Jeddah, Saudi Arabia	Bangladesh	3–0	1998 World Cup qualifier	1
7	29 March 1997	Jeddah, Saudi Arabia	Malaysia	3–0	1998 World Cup qualifier	1
8	25 September 1997	Riyadh, Saudi Arabia	Mali	5–1	Friendly	1
9, 10	11 September 1998	Dammam, Saudi Arabia	Tanzania	8–0	Friendly	2
11, 12	14 September 1998	Dammam, Saudi Arabia	Sudan	2–1	Friendly	2
13	17 September 1998	Dammam, Saudi Arabia	Senegal	3–2	Friendly	1
14, 15, 16	27 September 1998	Doha, Qatar	Lebanon	4–1	1998 Arab Cup	3
17, 18, 19	1 October 1998	Doha, Qatar	Qatar	3–1	1998 Arab Cup	3
20, 21	30 October 1998	Manama, Bahrain	Kuwait	2–1	1998 Gulf Cup	2
22	5 November 1998	Manama, Bahrain	Oman	1–0	1998 Gulf Cup	1
23	18 June 1999	Abha, Saudi Arabia	Jordan	2–0	Friendly	1
24, 25	25 September 2000	Riyadh, Saudi Arabia	Syria	3–0	Friendly	2
26	28 September 2000	Riyadh, Saudi Arabia	United Arab Emirates	6–1	Friendly	1
27	8 February 2001	Dammam, Saudi Arabia	Mongolia	6–0	2002 World Cup qualifier	1
28, 29	15 February 2001	Dammam, Saudi Arabia	Mongolia	6–0	2002 World Cup qualifier	2
30, 31	17 February 2001	Dammam, Saudi Arabia	Bangladesh	6–0	2002 World Cup qualifier	2
32	19 February 2001	Dammam, Saudi Arabia	Vietnam	4–0	2002 World Cup qualifier	1
33	10 July 2001	Singapore,	Singapore	3–0	Friendly	1
34	1 August 2001	Riyadh, Saudi Arabia	North Macedonia	1–1	Friendly	1
35	5 August 2001	Riyadh, Saudi Arabia	Qatar	1–2	Friendly	1
36	17 August 2001	Riyadh, Saudi Arabia	Bahrain	1–1	2002 World Cup qualifier	1
37	31 August 2001	Manama, Bahrain	Iraq	1–0	2002 World Cup qualifier	1
38	15 September 2001	Bangkok, Thailand	Thailand	3–1	2002 World Cup qualifier	1
39	21 September 2001	Manama, Bahrain	Bahrain	4–0	2002 World Cup qualifier	1
40, 41	27 March 2002	Dammam, Saudi Arabia	Uruguay	3–2	Friendly	2
