= 14th Arabian Gulf Cup =

International football tournament in 1998

Tournament details
- Host country: Bahrain
- Dates: 30 October – 12 November
- Venue: 1 (in 1 host city)

Final positions
- Champions: Kuwait (9th title)
- Runners-up: Saudi Arabia

Tournament statistics
- Matches played: 15
- Goals scored: 40 (2.67 per match)
- Top scorer(s): (Kuwait) Jasem Al-Huwaidi (9 goals)
- Best player: (Kuwait) Bader Haji
- Best goalkeeper: (Saudi Arabia) Mohamed Al-Deayea

The 14th Arabian Gulf Cup (Arabic: كأس الخليج العربي) was held in Bahrain, in October and November 1998. Kuwait won the tournament for the record-extending 9th time.

Iraq continued to be banned from the tournament over the invasion of Kuwait in 1990.

== Tournament ==
The teams played a single round-robin style competition. The team achieving first place in the overall standings was the tournament winner.

=== Standings ===
Team	Pld	W	D	L	GF	GA	GD	Pts
Kuwait	5	4	0	1	18	5	+13	12
Saudi Arabia	5	3	2	0	5	2	+3	11
United Arab Emirates	5	2	1	2	5	7	−2	7
Oman	5	1	1	3	6	12	−6	4
Bahrain	5	0	3	2	3	6	−3	3
Qatar	5	0	3	2	3	8	−5	3

=== Results ===
30 October 1998

Bahrain	0–1	United Arab Emirates
		Ahmed 40'

Bahrain National Stadium, Riffa
31 October 1998

Kuwait	1–2	Saudi Arabia
Al-Khodari 62'		Al-Dosari 6', 74'

Bahrain National Stadium, Riffa
31 October 1998

Oman	2–1	Qatar
Al-Masori 25'; Al-Siyabi 59'		Khamis 29'

Bahrain National Stadium, Riffa

2 November 1998

Kuwait	6–2	Qatar
Al-Huwaidi 8', 28', 57', 73', 90'; Abdullah 51'		Bujaloof 20'; Mustafa 80'

Bahrain National Stadium, Riffa
2 November 1998

Saudi Arabia	1–1	Bahrain
Al-Thunayan 31'		Abbas 45'

Bahrain National Stadium, Riffa
3 November 1998

United Arab Emirates	3–2	Oman
Ahmed 27'; Talyani 52'; Al-Mulla 82'		Shaaban 75', 80'

Bahrain National Stadium, Riffa

5 November 1998

Qatar	0–0	United Arab Emirates

Bahrain National Stadium, Riffa
5 November 1998

Oman	0–1	Saudi Arabia
		Al-Dosari 78'

Bahrain National Stadium, Riffa
6 November 1998

Bahrain	0–2	Kuwait
		Sakeen 45'; Laheeb 84'

Bahrain National Stadium, Riffa

8 November 1998

Qatar	0–0	Bahrain

Bahrain National Stadium, Riffa
8 November 1998

Saudi Arabia	1–0	United Arab Emirates
Al-Faheed 18'

Bahrain National Stadium, Riffa
9 November 1998

Oman	0–5	Kuwait
		Al-Huwaidi 36', 86'; Haji 52'; Abdullah 81'; Sakeen 83'

Bahrain National Stadium, Riffa

11 November 1998

Qatar	0–0	Saudi Arabia

Bahrain National Stadium, Riffa
12 November 1998

United Arab Emirates	1–4	Kuwait
Mubarak 55'		Haji 19'; Sakeen 28'; Al-Huwaidi 64', 70'

Bahrain National Stadium, Riffa
12 November 1998

Bahrain	2–2	Oman
Yousef 16'; Al-Nusuf 42'		Khamis 13'; Al-Dhabit 22'

Bahrain National Stadium, Riffa

== Champions ==
14th Arabian Gulf Cup winners

Kuwait
9th title
