= Kuwait at the 1968 Summer Olympics =

- IOC code: KUW
- NOC: Kuwait Olympic Committee

in Mexico City
- Competitors: 2 in 1 sport
- Medals: Gold 0 Silver 0 Bronze 0 Total 0

Summer Olympics appearances (overview)
- 1968; 1972; 1976; 1980; 1984; 1988; 1992; 1996; 2000; 2004; 2008; 2012; 2016; 2020; 2024

Other related appearances
- Independent Olympic Athletes (2016)

Kuwait competed in the Olympic Games for the first time at the 1968 Summer Olympics in Mexico City, Mexico.

The Kuwaiti Olympic team did not win any medals in these Games.

== Athletics ==
Men
Track & road events

=== Marathon ===
- Mraljeb Ayed Mansoor: DNF
- Saoud Obaid Daifallah: DNF
