= Kuwait at the 1984 Summer Olympics =

- IOC code: KUW
- NOC: Kuwait Olympic Committee

in Los Angeles
- Competitors: 23 in 5 sports
- Flag bearer: Tareq Al-Ghareeb
- Medals: Gold 0 Silver 0 Bronze 0 Total 0

Summer Olympics appearances (overview)
- 1968; 1972; 1976; 1980; 1984; 1988; 1992; 1996; 2000; 2004; 2008; 2012; 2016; 2020; 2024

Other related appearances
- Independent Olympic Athletes (2016)

Kuwait competed at the 1984 Summer Olympics in Los Angeles, United States. 23 competitors, all men, took part in 17 events in 5 sports.

== Athletics ==
Men's 110 metres hurdles

- Naji Mubarak (Note: Naji Abdullah Mubarak (Arabic: ناجي عبد الله مبارك; born 27 March 1964) is a Kuwaiti hurdler. He competed in the men's 110 metres hurdles at the 1984 Summer Olympics. Mubarak set his 110 metres hurdles personal best in 1983, running 14.40 seconds. At the 1984 Olympics, Mubarak was seeded in the third heat. He ran 14.56 seconds to place 5th, failing to advance to the semi-finals.)
  - Heats — 14.56 (→ did not advance, 5th place)

== Diving ==
Men

Athlete	Event	Preliminary		Final	
Athlete	Event	Points	Rank	Points	Rank
Abdulla Abuqrais	3 m springboard	312.24	29	Did not advance	
Majed Al-Taqi	3 m springboard	299.16	30	Did not advance	
Abdulla Abuqrais	10 m platform	342.03	22	Did not advance	

== Fencing ==
Nine fencers, all men, represented Kuwait in 1984.

Men's foil

- Khaled Al-Awadhi
- Ahmed Al-Ahmed
- Kifah Al-Mutawa

Men's team foil

- Ahmed Al-Ahmed, Khaled Al-Awadhi, Kifah Al-Mutawa, Mohamed Ghaloum

Men's épée

- Mohamed Al-Thuwani
- Kazem Hasan
- Osama Al-Khurafi

Men's team épée

- Osama Al-Khurafi, Abdul Nasser Al-Sayegh, Ali Hasan, Kazem Hasan, Mohamed Al-Thuwani

== Swimming ==
Men

Athlete	Event	Heat		Final	
Athlete	Event	Time	Rank	Time	Rank
Khaled Al-Assaf	100 m freestyle	56.91	59	Did not advance	
Ahmad Al-Hahdoud	100 m breaststroke	1:13.01	47	Did not advance	
Isaac Atish Wa-El	100 m breaststroke	1:16.51	49	Did not advance	
Ahmad Al-Hahdoud	200 m breaststroke	2:37.63	41	Did not advance	
Adel Al-Ghaith	100 m butterfly	1:04.62	48	Did not advance	
Faisal Marzouk	100 m butterfly	1:02.00	44	Did not advance	
