= Kuwait at the 1988 Summer Olympics =

- IOC code: KUW
- NOC: Kuwait Olympic Committee

in Seoul
- Competitors: 25 in 7 sports
- Flag bearer: Jasem Al-Dowaila
- Medals: Gold 0 Silver 0 Bronze 0 Total 0

Summer Olympics appearances (overview)
- 1968; 1972; 1976; 1980; 1984; 1988; 1992; 1996; 2000; 2004; 2008; 2012; 2016; 2020; 2024

Other related appearances
- Independent Olympic Athletes (2016)

Kuwait competed at the 1988 Summer Olympics in Seoul, South Korea. 25 competitors, all men, took part in 24 events in 7 sports.

== Competitors ==
The following is the list of number of competitors in the Games.

| Sport | Men | Women | Total |
|---|---|---|---|
| Athletics | 6 | 0 | 6 |
| Boxing | 3 | – | 3 |
| Diving | 1 | 0 | 1 |
| Fencing | 8 | 0 | 8 |
| Judo | 4 | – | 4 |
| Rowing | 1 | 0 | 1 |
| Swimming | 2 | 0 | 2 |
| Total | 25 | 0 | 25 |

== Athletics ==
=== Men ===
==== Track Events ====
| Athlete | Events | Heat | | Round 2 | | Semifinal | | Final | |
| Athlete | Events | Time | Position | Time | Position | Time | Position | Time | Position |
|---|---|---|---|---|---|---|---|---|---|
| Jasem Aldowaila | 400 m Hurdles | 51.87 | 31 | | | Did not advance | | | |
| Zeyad Alkhudhur | 110 m Hurdles | 14.44 | 30 | 14.56 | 31 | Did not advance | | | |

==== Field events ====
| Athlete | Event | Qualifying | | Final | |
| Athlete | Event | Distance | Position | Distance | Position |
|---|---|---|---|---|---|
| Waleed Albakheet | Hammer | 63.86m | 27 | Did not advance | |
| Marsouq Alyouhah | Triple Jump | 15.72m | 28 | Did not advance | |
| Ghanem Mabrouk | Javelin | 65.84m | 35 | Did not advance | |
| Muhammad Zankawi | Shot Put | 15.92m | 20 | Did not advance | |

== Boxing ==
| Athlete | Event | Round of 64 | Round of 32 | Round of 16 | Quarterfinals | Semifinals | Final |
| Athlete | Event | Opposition Result | Opposition Result | Opposition Result | Opposition Result | Opposition Result | Opposition Result |
|---|---|---|---|---|---|---|---|
| Ali Al-Baluchi | Super Heavyweight | | | Aleksandr Miroshnichenko (URS); L 5-0 | Did not advance | | |
| Husain Al-Mutairi | Flyweight | | Alfred Kotey (GHA); L RSCO | Did not advance | | | |
| Saud Al-Muwaizri | Bantamweight | Katsuyoki Matsushima (JPN); L RSCH | Did not advance | | | | |

== Diving ==
Men

| Athlete | Events | Preliminary | | Final | |
| Athlete | Events | Points | Rank | Points | Rank |
|---|---|---|---|---|---|
| Majed Al-Taqi or Altaqi | 3 m springboard | 387.60 | 31 | Did not advance | |

== Fencing ==
Men

| Athlete | Event | Preliminary round | Round of 32 | Round of 16 | Quarterfinal | Semifinal | Final | Final rank |
|---|---|---|---|---|---|---|---|---|
| Khaled Alawadh | Foil | | Did not advance | | | | | 62 |
| Mohammad Alhamar | Épée | | Did not advance | | | | | 44 |
| Younes Almashmoum | Épée | | Did not advance | | | | | 53 |
| Saqer Alsurayei | Foil | | Did not advance | | | | | 61 |
| Khaled Jahrami | Épée | | Did not advance | | | | | 62 |
| Salman Mohammad | Foil | | Did not advance | | | | | 64 |
| Khaled Alawadhi; Faisal Alharshani; Saqer Alsuraye] Khaled Jahrami; Salman Mohammad | Team Foil | East Germany; L 0-9 China; L 3-9; Great Britain; L 5-9 | | | Did not advance | | | 15 |
| Mohammad Alhamar; Younes Almashmoum; Nahedh Almurdh; Khaled Jahrami | Team Épée | France; L 0-9 Poland; L 1-9 | | | Did not advance | | | 18 |

== Judo ==
Men

| Athlete | Event | Round of 32 | Round of 16 | Quarterfinals | Semifinals | First Repechage Round | Repechage Quarterfinals | Repechage Semifinals | Final |
| Athlete | Event | Opposition Result | Opposition Result | Opposition Result | Opposition Result | Opposition Result | Opposition Result | Opposition Result | Opposition Result |
|---|---|---|---|---|---|---|---|---|---|
| Yousef Alhammad | −86kg | Canu (FRA); L 0000-0200 | Did not advance | | | | | | |
| Adel Alnajadah | −71kg | Beauchamp (CAN); L 0000-1001 | Did not advance | | | | | | |
| Hisham Elsharaf | −78kg | Aquino (GUM); W 1011-0000 | Erhembayar (MGL); L 0000-0000 | Did not advance | | | | | |
| Hussei Safar | −65kg | Elmamoun (MAR); L 0010-0000 | Did not advance | | | | | | |

== Rowing ==
Men

| Athlete(s) | Event | Heats | | Repechage | | Semifinals | | Final | |
| Athlete(s) | Event | Time | Rank | Time | Rank | Time | Rank | Time | Rank |
|---|---|---|---|---|---|---|---|---|---|
| Waleed Almohammad | Single sculls | 8:05.35 | 5 | 8:15.16 | 4 | Did not advance | | | |

== Swimming ==
Men

| Athlete | Events | Heat | | Semifinal | | Final | |
| Athlete | Events | Time | Rank | Time | Rank | Time | Rank |
|---|---|---|---|---|---|---|---|
| Hassan Alshammari | 50 m freestyle | 26.27 | 61 | Did not advance | | | |
| Hassan Alshammari | 100 m freestyle | 56.44 | 65 | Did not advance | | | |
| Sultan Alotaibi | 200 m butterfly | 2:12.89 | 38 | Did not advance | | | |
| Sultan Alotaibi | 200 m individual medley | 2:15.63 | 42 | Did not advance | | | |
| Sultan Alotaibi | 400 m individual medley | 4:50.16 | 31 | Did not advance | | | |
