= Kuwait at the 1972 Summer Olympics =

- IOC code: KUW
- NOC: Kuwait Olympic Committee

in Munich
- Flag bearer: Younis Abdallah
- Medals: Gold 0 Silver 0 Bronze 0 Total 0

Summer Olympics appearances (overview)
- 1968; 1972; 1976; 1980; 1984; 1988; 1992; 1996; 2000; 2004; 2008; 2012; 2016; 2020; 2024

Other related appearances
- Independent Olympic Athletes (2016)

Kuwait competed at the 1972 Summer Olympics in Munich, West Germany.

== Results by event ==
=== Athletics ===
Men's 100 metres

- Younis Abdallah Rabee

- First Heat — 11.20s (→ did not advance)

Men's 4 × 100 m Relay

- Abdulazeez Abdulkareem, Malik Murdhi, Mohammad Mobarak, and Younis Rabee

- Heat — DNS (→ did not advance)

Men's 400 metres

- Mohamed Saad Mubarak

- Heat — 49.61s (→ did not advance)

=== Swimming ===
Men

Athlete	Event	Heat		Semifinal		Final	
Athlete	Event	Time	Rank	Time	Rank	Time	Rank
Abdullah Abdulrahman Zeyab	100 m freestyle	1:03.94	48	Did not advance			
Fawzi Burhma	200 m freestyle	2:33.75	46	—N/a		Did not advance	
