= Abdullah Wabran =

Kuwaiti footballer (born 1971)

Personal information
- Full name: Abdullah Wabran Saihan Al-Rasheedi
- Date of birth: 2 July 1971 (age 55)
- Place of birth: Kuwait
- Position: Midfielder

Youth career
- –: Al Tadamun SC

Senior career*
Years	Team	Apps	(Gls)
1989–1995	Al Tadamun SC		
1995–1996	Al-Arabi SC		
1996–2000	Al Rayyan SC		
2000–2005	Al Tadamun SC		
2005–2007	Al-Arabi SC		

International career
1992–2007	Kuwait	56	(9)
- * Club domestic league appearances and goals

Abdullah Wabran Saihan (born 2 July 1971) is a former Kuwaiti footballers, he played for Kuwait national football team. He participated in two editions of the Olympic Games (1992, 2000) and in two editions of the AFC Asian Cup (1996, 2000).

== Honours ==
=== Personal ===
- Best player of the 13th Arabian Gulf Cup in Oman

=== Club ===
Al-Arabi

- Kuwait Emir Cup in 1996, 2006
- Kuwait Crown Prince Cup in 1996, 2007

Al-Rayyan

- Emir of Qatar Cup in 1999
- Qatar Cup in 1996

=== National ===
- Arabian Gulf Cup 1996,1998
- Third place in the 1998 Arab Cup
