= Kuwait at the 2012 Summer Olympics =

- IOC code: KUW
- NOC: Kuwait Olympic Committee

in London
- Competitors: 10 in 4 sports
- Flag bearer: Fehaid Al-Deehani
- Medals Ranked 79th: Gold 0 Silver 0 Bronze 1 Total 1

Summer Olympics appearances (overview)
- 1968; 1972; 1976; 1980; 1984; 1988; 1992; 1996; 2000; 2004; 2008; 2012; 2016; 2020; 2024

Other related appearances
- Independent Olympic Athletes (2016)

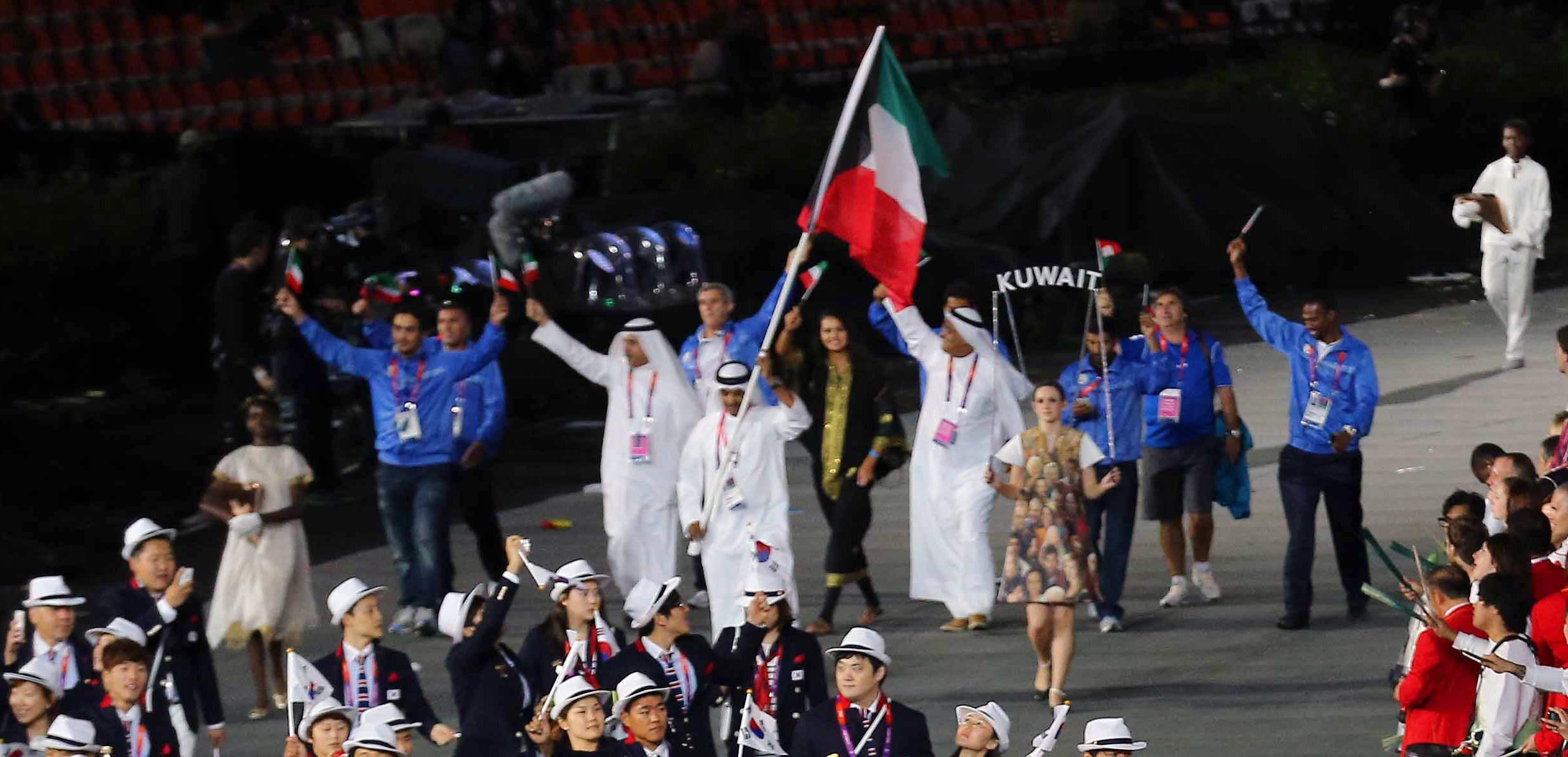

Kuwait competed at the 2012 Summer Olympics in London from 27 July to 12 August 2012. This was the nation's twelfth consecutive appearance at the Olympics.

On May 24, the International Olympic Committee announced that Kuwaiti athletes would compete under the Olympic flag as Independent Olympic Athletes at the Olympics due to two-year suspension of the Kuwait Olympic Committee. On July 14, Kuwaiti athletes were allowed to participate under their own flag, after the suspension was lifted.

Kuwait Olympic Committee sent a total of 10 athletes to the Games, 8 men and 2 women, to compete in 4 different sports. Trap shooter Fehaid Al-Deehani, who participated at his sixth Olympics as the team's most experienced member, reprised his role to be Kuwait's flag bearer at the opening ceremony. He also set the nation's historical milestone, as the first Kuwaiti athlete to win more than a single medal in Olympic history.

== Medalists ==
Medal	Name	Sport	Event	Date
Bronze	Fehaid Al-Deehani	Shooting	Men's trap	6 August

== Athletics ==
Kuwaiti athletes have so far achieved qualifying standards in the following athletics events (up to a maximum of 3 athletes in each event at the 'A' Standard, and 1 at the 'B' Standard):

Men
Track & road events

Athlete	Event	Heat		Semifinal		Final	
Athlete	Event	Result	Rank	Result	Rank	Result	Rank
Fawaz Al-Shammari	110 m hurdles	14.00	7	Did not advance			
Mohammad Al-Azemi	800 m	DSQ		Did not advance			

Field events

Athlete	Event	Qualification		Final	
Athlete	Event	Distance	Position	Distance	Position
Ali Al-Zinkawi	Hammer throw	73.40	18	Did not advance	

== Shooting ==
Kuwait has ensured berths in the following events of shooting:

Men

Athlete	Event	Qualification		Final	
Athlete	Event	Points	Rank	Points	Rank
Fehaid Al-Deehani	Trap	124	2 Q	145	3rd place, bronze medalist(s)
Fehaid Al-Deehani	Double trap	140	3 Q	185	4
Abdullah Al-Rashidi	Skeet	116	21	Did not advance	
Talal Al-Rashidi	Trap	116	26	Did not advance	

Women

Athlete	Event	Qualification		Final	
Athlete	Event	Points	Rank	Points	Rank
Maryam Erzouqi	50 m rifle 3 positions	564	44	Did not advance	
Maryam Erzouqi	10 m air rifle	393	28	Did not advance	

== Swimming ==
Kuwaiti swimmers have so far achieved qualifying standards in the following events (up to a maximum of 2 swimmers in each event at the Olympic Qualifying Time (OQT), and potentially 1 at the Olympic Selection Time (OST)):

Men

Athlete	Event	Heat		Semifinal		Final	
Athlete	Event	Time	Rank	Time	Rank	Time	Rank
Yousef Al-Askari	200 m butterfly	2:05.41	36	Did not advance			

Women

Athlete	Event	Heat		Semifinal		Final	
Athlete	Event	Time	Rank	Time	Rank	Time	Rank
Faye Sultan	50 m freestyle	27.92	48	Did not advance			

== Table tennis ==
Kuwait has qualified one athlete.

Athlete	Event	Preliminary round	Round 1	Round 2	Round 3	Round 4	Quarterfinals	Semifinals	Final / BM	
Athlete	Event	Opposition Result	Opposition Result	Opposition Result	Opposition Result	Opposition Result	Opposition Result	Opposition Result	Opposition Result	Rank
Ibrahem Al-Hasan	Men's singles	Idowu (CGO); W 4–2	Drinkhall (GBR); L 0–4	Did not advance						
