= Independent Olympic Athletes at the 2017 Asian Winter Games =

- IOC code: IOA

in Sapporo and Obihiro February 19–26
- Competitors: 23 in 1 sport
- Flag bearer: Volunteer (Closing Ceremony)
- Medals: Gold 0 Silver 0 Bronze 0 Total 0

Asian Winter Games appearances
- 2011; 2017; 2025; 2029

Independent Olympic Athletes are scheduled to compete in the 2017 Asian Winter Games in Sapporo and Obihiro, Japan from February 19 to 26. The team is scheduled to compete in one sport: ice hockey, and consists of 23 athletes.

== Background ==
The Kuwait Olympic Committee was suspended in October 2015, due to political interference. Therefore, the country is scheduled to compete under the Olympic flag as Independent Olympic Athletes.

== Competitors ==
The following table lists the delegation per sport and gender.

Sport	Men	Women	Total
Ice hockey	23	0	23
Total	23	0	23

== Ice hockey ==
The Independent Olympic Athletes are scheduled to compete in division 2 of the men's tournament. The Independent Olympic Athletes finished in sixth place (16th place overall) in division 2 of the competition.

=== Men's tournament ===
Independent Olympic Athletes were represented by the following 23 athletes:

- Dhari Alomran (G)
- Jasem Alsarraf (G)
- Jasem Dashti (G)
- Meshal Alajmi (D)
- Jasem Alawadhi (D)
- Meshal Alfoudari (D)
- Fahad Alhenaidi (D)
- Saleh Almaghrabi (D)
- Mohammad Almaraqi (D)
- Abdullah Alzidan (D)
- Hussain Baqer (D)
- Ahmad Alajmi (F)
- Hamad Alajmi (F)
- Mohammad Alajmi (F)
- Salem Alajmi (F)
- Abdullah Alasousi (F)
- Yousef Alkandari (F)
- Abdulaziz Almaraghy (F)
- Abdullah Almaragi (F)
- Hamad Alshayji (F)
- Yousef Andekali (F)
- Bashar Mohammed (F)
- Abdulaziz Shetail (F)

Legend: G = Goali, D = Defense, F = Forward

Group A

Rank	Team	Pld	W	OW	OL	L	GF	GA	GD	Pts
1	Kyrgyzstan	3	3	0	0	0	22	7	+15	9
2	Philippines	3	2	0	0	1	27	15	+12	6
3	(International Olympic Committee) Independent Olympic Athletes	3	1	0	0	2	9	15	–6	3
4	Qatar	3	0	0	0	3	6	27	–21	0

18 February 2017; 20:00	Independent Olympic Athletes (International Olympic Committee)	0–5 (0–1, 0–3, 0–1)	Kyrgyzstan	Hoshioki Ice Skating Rink; Attendance: 104

Game reference
			Referee: (South Korea) Lee Joo-hyun; Linesmen: (Japan) Shiiya Kenichi (Finland) Jussi Thomann
60 min	Penalties	71 min	Referee: (South Korea) Lee Joo-hyun; Linesmen: (Japan) Shiiya Kenichi (Finland) Jussi Thomann
19	Shots	48	Referee: (South Korea) Lee Joo-hyun; Linesmen: (Japan) Shiiya Kenichi (Finland) Jussi Thomann

21 February 2017; 16:30	Qatar	2–6 (0–1, 0–2, 2–3)	(International Olympic Committee) Independent Olympic Athletes	Hoshioki Ice Skating Rink; Attendance: 62

Game reference
4 min	Penalties	16 min
16	Shots	33

24 February 2017; 20:00	Philippines	8–3 (2–2, 4–0, 2–1)	(International Olympic Committee) Independent Olympic Athletes	Hoshioki Ice Skating Rink; Attendance: 127

Game reference
76 min	Penalties	86 min
38	Shots	41
