= Younes Ahmed =

Qatari footballer (born 1963)

Personal information
- Date of birth: 17 August 1963 (age 63)
- Place of birth: Doha, Qatar
- Height: 1.68 m (5 ft 6 in)
- Position: Goalkeeper

Senior career*
Years	Team	Apps	(Gls)
1977–1998	Al Rayyan		(0)

International career
1981	Qatar U–20	5	(0)
1983–1997	Qatar	75	
- * Club domestic league appearances and goals

Younes Ahmed (born 17 July 1963) is a former Qatari football goalkeeper. He played for both Al Rayyan and the Qatari national team. He competed in the men's tournament at the 1984 Summer Olympics.
