= Jarrah Al-Asmawi =

Kuwaiti swimmer

Personal information
- Nationality: Kuwait
- Born: 19 August 1970 (age 54)

Sport
- Sport: Swimming

Jarrah Al-Asmawi (born 19 August 1970) is a Kuwaiti swimmer. He competed in the 1992 Summer Olympics.
