= Abdul Ridha Al-Boloushi =

Kuwaiti handball player

Personal information
- Nationality: Kuwait
- Born: 27 September 1972 (age 52)

Sport
- Sport: Handball

Abdul Ridha Al-Boloushi (born 27 September 1972) is a Kuwaiti handball player. He competed in the 1996 Summer Olympics.
