= Faraj Laheeb =

Kuwaiti footballer

Personal information
- Full name: Faraj Laheeb Saeed
- Date of birth: October 3, 1978 (age 48)
- Place of birth: Kuwait City, Kuwait
- Height: 1.67 m (5 ft 6 in)
- Position: Striker

Senior career*
Years	Team	Apps	(Gls)
1998–2014	Al Kuwait	101	(40)
2000	→ Al Ettifaq (loan)	21	(8)
2007–2008	→ Al Salmiya (loan)	15	(14)
2009–2010	→ Al Salmiya (loan)	20	(3)
2010–2012	→ Kazma (loan)	10	(2)
2012	→ Al Yarmouk (loan)	2	(0)
2013	→ Al-Fahaheel FC (loan)		

International career
1998–2009	Kuwait	45	(23)
- * Club domestic league appearances and goals

Faraj Laheeb (Arabic: فرج لهيب) (born October 3, 1978 in Kuwait) is a retired Kuwaiti football player.

He played for Al-Kuwait in the 2007 AFC Champions League group stage.

== Career statistics ==
=== International ===
Appearances and goals by national team and year
National team	Year	Apps	Goals
Kuwait
Kuwait	1998	15	13
Kuwait	2000	6	0
Kuwait	2001	3	1
Kuwait	2002	9	1
Kuwait	2004	6	4
Kuwait	2005	4	0
Kuwait	2006	4	4
Kuwait	2007	2	1
Kuwait	2008	1	0
Total		50	24

Scores and results list Kuwait's goal tally first, score column indicates score after each Laheeb goal.

List of international goals scored by Faraj Laheeb
No.	Date	Venue	Opponent	Score	Result	Competition	Ref.
1	13 September 1998	Kuwait City, Kuwait	North Korea	1-0	4-0	Friendly	
2	13 September 1998	Kuwait City, Kuwait	North Korea	2-0	4-0	Friendly	
3	13 October 1998	Mohammed Al-Hamad Stadium, Hawally, Kuwait	Iran	1-0	3-0	Friendly	
4	6 November 1998	Bahrain National Stadium, Riffa, Bahrain	Bahrain	2-0	2-0	14th Arabian Gulf Cup	
5	1 December 1998	700th Anniversary Stadium, Chiang Mai, Thailand	Mongolia	2-0	11-0	1998 Asian Games	
6	1 December 1998	700th Anniversary Stadium, Chiang Mai, Thailand	Mongolia	3-0	11-0	1998 Asian Games	
7	1 December 1998	700th Anniversary Stadium, Chiang Mai, Thailand	Mongolia	4-0	11-0	1998 Asian Games	
8	1 December 1998	700th Anniversary Stadium, Chiang Mai, Thailand	Mongolia	10-0	11-0	1998 Asian Games	
9	3 December 1998	700th Anniversary Stadium, Chiang Mai, Thailand	Uzbekistan	2-3	3-3	1998 Asian Games	
10	3 December 1998	700th Anniversary Stadium, Chiang Mai, Thailand	Uzbekistan	3-3	3-3	1998 Asian Games	
11	7 December 1998	Rajamangala Stadium, Bangkok, Thailand	United Arab Emirates	2-0	5-0	1998 Asian Games	
12	9 December 1998	Rajamangala Stadium, Bangkok, Thailand	Japan	1-0	1-2	1998 Asian Games	
13	16 December 1998	Rajamangala Stadium, Bangkok, Thailand	Thailand	2-0	3-0	1998 Asian Games	
14	24 February 2001	Al Kuwait Sports Club Stadium, Kuwait City, Kuwait	Kyrgyzstan	2-0	2-0	2002 FIFA World Cup qualification	
15	5 January 2002	Kuwait City, Kuwait	Zimbabwe	3-0	3-0	Friendly	
16	10 November 2004	Al-Sadaqua Walsalam Stadium, Kuwait City, Kuwait	Kyrgyzstan	3-0	3-0	Friendly	
17	17 November 2004	Al-Sadaqua Walsalam Stadium, Kuwait City, Kuwait	Malaysia	4-1	6-1	2006 FIFA World Cup qualification	
18	17 November 2004	Al-Sadaqua Walsalam Stadium, Kuwait City, Kuwait	Malaysia	6-1	6-1	2006 FIFA World Cup qualification	
19	6 December 2004	Kuwait City, Kuwait	Tajikistan	2-0	3-0	Friendly	
20	9 November 2006	Sheikh Khalifa International Stadium, Al Ain, United Arab Emirates	Taiwan	2-0	10-0	Friendly	
21	9 November 2006	Sheikh Khalifa International Stadium, Al Ain, United Arab Emirates	Taiwan	4-0	10-0	Friendly	
22	9 November 2006	Sheikh Khalifa International Stadium, Al Ain, United Arab Emirates	Taiwan	6-0	10-0	Friendly	
23	15 November 2006	Bahrain National Stadium, Riffa, Bahrain	Bahrain	1-2	1-2	2007 AFC Asian Cup qualification	
24	5 June 2007	Thamir Stadium, Al Salmiya, Kuwait	Portugal	1-0	1-1	Friendly	
