= Bashar Omar =

Kuwaiti middle-distance runner

Personal information
- Nationality: Kuwaiti
- Born: 14 March 1979 (age 47)

Sport
- Sport: Middle-distance running
- Event: Steeplechase

Bashar Omar (born 14 March 1979) is a Kuwaiti middle-distance runner. He competed in the men's 3000 metres steeplechase at the 2004 Summer Olympics.
