= Ayman Al-Enazy =

Kuwaiti swimmer

Personal information
- Nationality: Kuwait
- Born: 18 July 1973 (age 52)

Sport
- Sport: Swimming

Ayman Al-Enazy (born 18 July 1973) is a Kuwaiti swimmer. He competed in the 1992 Summer Olympics in the men's 100 metre breaststroke and men's 200 metre breaststroke events. He was a national champion and Arab junior champion.
