= Esam Sakeen =

Kuwaiti footballer (born 1971)

Personal information
- Full name: Esam Sakeen Al-Kandari
- Date of birth: 2 July 1971 (age 55)
- Place of birth: Kuwait
- Position: Midfielder

Senior career*
Years	Team	Apps	(Gls)
1989–2006	Kazma SC		

International career
1996–2002	Kuwait	58	(4)
- * Club domestic league appearances and goals

Esam Sakeen Al-Kandari (born 2 July 1971) is a Kuwaiti football midfielder who played for Kuwait in the 1996 Asian Cup. He also played for Kazma SC. He competed in the men's tournament at the 2000 Summer Olympics.
