= Ibrahim Al-Hasan =

Kuwaiti table tennis player

Ibrahem Al-Hasan (born 22 August 1986) is a Kuwaiti table tennis player. He competed at the 2008 and 2012 Summer Olympics in the Men's singles, but was defeated in the first round in both Games.
