= Ahmed Mubarak Al-Shafi =

Qatari footballer (born 1974)

Ahmed Mubarak Al Shafi
Personal information
- Full name: Ahmed bin Mubarak bin H. bin S. Al Shafi
- Date of birth: 21 October 1974 (age 52)

Senior career*
Years	Team	Apps	(Gls)
- Al Rayyan SC

International career
1997	Qatar	1	(0)
- * Club domestic league appearances and goals

Ahmed Mubarak H.S. Al Shafi (أحمد مبارك آل شافي) (or spelled as Ahmad) (born 21 October 1974) is a former Qatari footballer.

He played the 1998 FIFA World Cup qualification match against Saudi Arabia on 11 October 1997.

He also played at 1991 FIFA U-17 World Championship.
