= Athletes from Kuwait at the 2011 Asian Winter Games =

- IOC code: IOC
- NOC: Kuwait Olympic Committee

in Astana and Almaty
- Competitors: 21 in 1 sport
- Medals: Gold 0 Silver 0 Bronze 0 Total 0

Asian Winter Games appearances
- 2011; 2017; 2025; 2029

Athletes from Kuwait participated in the 2011 Asian Winter Games in Almaty and Astana, Kazakhstan from January 30, 2011, to February 6, 2011. These athletes competed under the Olympic flag because the Kuwait Olympic Committee had been suspended by the International Olympic Committee in January 2010.

== Ice hockey ==
Men

The team is in the premier division for these games.

=== Premier Division ===
Team	GP	W	OTW	OTL	L	GF	GA	DIF	PTS
United Arab Emirates	0	0	0	0	0	0	0	0	0
Thailand	0	0	0	0	0	0	0	0	0
Malaysia	0	0	0	0	0	0	0	0	0
Mongolia	0	0	0	0	0	0	0	0	0
Kuwait	0	0	0	0	0	0	0	0	0
Kyrgyzstan	0	0	0	0	0	0	0	0	0
Bahrain	0	0	0	0	0	0	0	0	0

== See also ==
- Athletes from Kuwait at the 2010 Summer Youth Olympics
- Athletes from Kuwait at the 2010 Asian Games
- Athletes from Kuwait at the 2010 Asian Para Games
