= Kuwait at the Olympics =

- IOC code: KUW
- NOC: Kuwait Olympic Committee
- Website: www.kuwaitolympic.net (in Arabic and English)
- Medals Ranked 147th: Gold 0 Silver 0 Bronze 3 Total 3

Summer appearances
- 1968; 1972; 1976; 1980; 1984; 1988; 1992; 1996; 2000; 2004; 2008; 2012; 2016; 2020; 2024

Other related appearances
- Independent Olympic Athletes (2016)

Kuwait has competed in 14 Summer Olympic Games. To date, Kuwait has won three bronze Olympic medals. The nation has never participated in any Winter Olympic Games.

In the 1992 Barcelona Games, Kuwait received a bronze medal in the then-demonstration sport of taekwondo. Their first Olympic medal was a bronze for double trap shooting, won by Fehaid Al-Deehani at the 2000 Olympics in Sydney. Their second was also a bronze won by Al-Deehani in the men's trap at the 2012 Summer Olympics in London. In 2016, Al-Deehani won the gold medal for men's double trap as an independent athlete, as the Kuwait Olympic Committee had been suspended by the International Olympic Committee (IOC) for the second time in five years due to governmental interference.

The National Olympic Committee for Kuwait was formed in 1957. It was recognized by the International Olympic Committee in 1966, but has been suspended twice in the past ten years.

Due to its most recent suspension, Kuwait was not allowed to compete as a sovereign state at the 2016 Summer Olympics, though the nation's participants were able to compete as Independent Olympic Athletes under the Olympic flag. At those games, Kuwaiti shooters Fehaid Al-Deehani and Abdullah Al-Rashidi won a gold medal and bronze medal respectively as independent athletes.

== Participation ==
=== Combined medals ===
Combined IOC codes	№ Games	1st place, gold medalist(s)	2nd place, silver medalist(s)	3rd place, bronze medalist(s)	Combined total
Kuwait	13	0	0	3	3
Independent Olympic Athletes (2016)	1	1	0	1	2
Total	14	1	0	4	5

== Medal tables ==
=== Medals by Summer Games ===
Games	Athletes	Gold	Silver	Bronze	Total	Rank
1968 Mexico City	2	0	0	0	0	–
1972 Munich	4	0	0	0	0	–
1976 Montreal	15	0	0	0	0	–
1980 Moscow	56	0	0	0	0	–
1984 Los Angeles	23	0	0	0	0	–
1988 Seoul	25	0	0	0	0	–
1992 Barcelona	32	0	0	0	0	–
1996 Atlanta	25	0	0	0	0	–
2000 Sydney	29	0	0	1	1	71
2004 Athens	11	0	0	0	0	–
2008 Beijing	8	0	0	0	0	–
2012 London	10	0	0	1	1	79
2016 Rio de Janeiro	as Independent Olympic Athletes					
2020 Tokyo	10	0	0	1	1	86
2024 Paris	9	0	0	0	0	–
2028 Los Angeles	future event					
2032 Brisbane	future event					
Total		0	0	3	3	147

=== Medals by sport ===
Sport	Gold	Silver	Bronze	Total
Shooting	0	0	3	3
Totals (1 entries)	0	0	3	3

== List of medalists ==
Medal	Name	Games	Sport	Event
Bronze	Fehaid Al-Deehani	2000 Sydney	Shooting	Men's double trap
Bronze	Fehaid Al-Deehani	2012 London	Shooting	Men's trap
Bronze	Abdullah Al-Rashidi	2020 Tokyo	Shooting	Men's skeet

== See also ==
- List of flag bearers for Kuwait at the Olympics
- Kuwait at the Paralympics
