= Hussain Al-Khodari =

Kuwaiti footballer

Personal information
- Date of birth: 7 February 1972 (age 54)
- Place of birth: Kuwait
- Position: Defender

Senior career*
Years	Team	Apps	(Gls)
1990–2004	Al-Salmiya SC		

International career
1992–2002	Kuwait	35	(8)
- * Club domestic league appearances and goals

Husain Al-Khodari is a Kuwait football defender who played for Kuwait in the 1992 Summer Olympics. He also played for Al-Salmiya SC
