= Fehaid Al-Deehani =

Kuwaiti sports shooter (born 1966)

- Fehaid Al-Deehani in 2016

Personal information
- Born: October 11, 1966 (age 60) Kuwait City, Kuwait
- Height: 1.76 m (5 ft 9 1/2 in)
- Weight: 96 kg (212 lb)

Sport
- Country: Kuwait
- Sport: Shooting
- Events: Trap, double trap
- Coached by: Mirko Cince

Achievements and titles
- Olympic finals: Gold medal at Rio Summer Olympics 2016
Medal record
Representing the Independent Olympic Athletes
Olympic Games
Gold medal – first place	2016 Rio de Janeiro	Double trap
Representing Kuwait
Olympic Games
Bronze medal – third place	2000 Sydney	Double trap
Bronze medal – third place	2012 London	Trap
Asian Championships
Gold medal – first place	2015 Kuwait City	Double trap
Gold medal – first place	2015 Kuwait City	Trap team
Gold medal – first place	2015 Kuwait City	Double trap team
Silver medal – second place	2012 Doha	Double trap
Silver medal – second place	2012 Doha	Double trap team
Asian Shotgun Championships
Gold medal – first place	2013 Almaty	Double trap team
Silver medal – second place	2012 Patiala	Trap team
Silver medal – second place	2012 Patiala	Double trap
Silver medal – second place	2013 Almaty	Trap
Silver medal – second place	2013 Almaty	Trap team
Bronze medal – third place	2012 Patiala	Double trap team
- Updated on 10 August 2016

Fahad Al-Deehani (Arabic: فهيد الديحاني, born October 11, 1966) is a Kuwaiti professional target shooter and officer in the Kuwaiti military. He was born in Kuwait City.

== Olympic career ==
Al-Deehani won a bronze medal for the men's double trap shooting event at the 2000 Summer Olympics and thus he became the first Kuwaiti to ever win an Olympic bronze medal. He won another bronze for the men's Olympic trap shooting event at the 2012 Summer Olympics.

At the 2016 Summer Olympics, Al-Deehani competed as an "independent Olympic athlete" because Kuwait was banned from the Olympics by the IOC. Al-Deehani called for the resignation of Kuwaiti officials responsible for the IOC ban, but refused to carry the Olympic flag in the 2016 Olympic opening ceremonies. Al-Deehani defeated Italian Marco Innocenti in the gold medal match of the men's double trap, becoming the first independent athlete and Kuwaiti to win a gold medal. He said the medal is the best answer to those who kept the Kuwait flag away from the award ceremonies, and added that everyone was calling him "Fehaid the Kuwaiti"; thus, the medal would carry the name of Kuwait: "I was not representing the Olympic Committee; rather I represented Kuwait."

Al-Deehani had retired in the year 2018 after an illustrious career. On 28 August 2023, he announced in an Instagram post that he is returning to international competitions as per an appeal from the Prime Minister of Kuwait, Sheikh Ahmad Al-Nawaf Al-Sabah and in response to homeland's call for return.

== Other competitions ==
In 2014, Al-Deehani won silver in the Asian Games double trap competition.

Olympic results
Event	1992	1996	2000	2004	2012	2016
Trap (mixed)	29th 140	Not held				
Trap (men)	Not held	20th 119	—	—	(bronze) Bronze; 124+21+4	—
Double trap (men)	Not held	10th 136	(bronze) Bronze; 141+45	8th 134	4th 140+45+1	(gold) Gold; 135+28+26

== See also ==
- Kuwait at the 2000 Summer Olympics
- Kuwait at the 2012 Summer Olympics
- Kuwait at the 2016 Summer Olympics

Olympic Games
Preceded by Fawzi Al-Shammari; Abdullah Al-Rashidi	Flagbearer for Kuwait; Athens 2004; London 2012	Succeeded by Abdullah Al-Rashidi; Incumbent
