= Lara Dashti =

Kuwaiti swimmer (born 2004)

Personal information
- Born: 24 January 2004 (age 22) Kuwait City, Kuwait

Sport
- Sport: Swimming

Lara Dashti (Arabic: لارا دشتي; born 24 January 2004 in Kuwait City) is a Kuwaiti swimmer.

In the 2020 Summer Olympics, Dashti was one of Kuwait's flagbearers along with shooter Talal Al-Rashidi, and was the first woman to carry Kuwait's flag at any Olympics. Dashti took part in the women's 50m freestyle.

Dashti competed in the 100m breaststroke at the 2024 Summer Olympics but came last in her heat.

Dashti studied at Wellesley College in Wellesley, Massachusetts, where she competed for the Wellesley Blue team.
