= Independent Olympic Athletes at the 2016 Summer Olympics =

- Olympic Flag
- IOC code: IOA

in Rio de Janeiro
- Competitors: 9 in 3 sports
- Flag bearer: Volunteer
- Medals Ranked 51st: Gold 1 Silver 0 Bronze 1 Total 2

Summer Olympics appearances (overview)
- 1992; 1996; 2000; 2004–2008; 2012; 2016; 2020; 2024

Other related appearances
- Kuwait (1968–pres.)

Independent Olympic athletes competed at the 2016 Summer Olympics in Rio de Janeiro, Brazil, from 5 to 21 August 2016. The team was composed of Kuwaiti athletes who competed under the Olympic flag, as the Kuwait Olympic Committee had been suspended by the International Olympic Committee (IOC) for the second time in five years due to governmental interference.

In addition to the independent athletes, ten refugees competed under the Olympic flag as the Refugee Olympic Team, which constituted a separate team.

Kuwaiti shooter Fehaid Al-Deehani became the first independent athlete to win a gold medal.

== Medalists ==
| Medal | Name | Sport | Event | Date |
|---|---|---|---|---|
| Gold | Fehaid Al-Deehani | Shooting | Men's double trap | 10 August |
| Bronze | Abdullah Al-Rashidi | Shooting | Men's skeet | 13 August |

== Background ==
The Kuwaiti Olympic Committee was suspended due to interference from the government. The suspension started in October 2015. Kuwait was also suspended in 2010, but this suspension was lifted before the start of the 2012 Olympic Games.

== Fencing ==
One fencer competed as independent athlete into the Olympic competition. Abdulaziz Al-Shatti had claimed his Olympic spot in the men's épée with a top finish at the Asian Zonal Qualifier in Wuxi, China, signifying the nation's sporters' return to the sport at the Olympics for the first time since 2000.

| Athlete | Event | Round of 64 | Round of 32 | Round of 16 | Quarterfinal | Semifinal | Final / BM | |
| Athlete | Event | Opposition Score | Opposition Score | Opposition Score | Opposition Score | Opposition Score | Opposition Score | Rank |
|---|---|---|---|---|---|---|---|---|
| Abdulaziz Al-Shatti | Men's épée | Rédli (HUN); L 13–14 | Did not advance | | | | | |

== Shooting ==
Kuwaiti individual shooters – starting as independent athletes and not for their country – have achieved quota places for the following events by virtue of their best finishes at the 2015 World Shotgun and Asian Championships, as long as they obtained a minimum qualifying score (MQS) by March 31, 2016.

| Athlete | Event | Qualification | | Semifinal | | Final | |
| Athlete | Event | Points | Rank | Points | Rank | Points | Rank |
|---|---|---|---|---|---|---|---|
| Ahmad Al-Afasi | Men's double trap | 128 | 15 | Did not advance | | | |
| Fehaid Al-Deehani | Men's double trap | 135 | 6 Q | 28 | 1 Q | 26 | 1st place, gold medalist(s) |
| Abdulrahman Al-Faihan | Men's trap | 115 | 14 | Did not advance | | | |
| Khaled Al-Mudhaf | Men's trap | 117 | 8 | Did not advance | | | |
| Abdullah Al-Rashidi | Men's skeet | 123 | 1 Q | 14 | 4 q | 16 | 3rd place, bronze medalist(s) |
| Saud Habib | Men's skeet | 117 | 20 | Did not advance | | | |

Qualification Legend: Q = Qualify for the next round; q = Qualify for the bronze medal (shotgun)

== Swimming ==
Kuwait has received a Universality invitation from FINA to send two swimmers (one male and one female) to the Olympics.

| Athlete | Event | Heat | | Semifinal | | Final | |
| Athlete | Event | Time | Rank | Time | Rank | Time | Rank |
|---|---|---|---|---|---|---|---|
| Abbas Qali | Men's 100 m butterfly | 54.63 | 36 | Did not advance | | | |
| Faye Sultan | Women's 50 m freestyle | 26.86 | 54 | Did not advance | | | |

== See also ==
- Kuwait at the 2016 Summer Paralympics
