= Kuwait Olympic Committee =

National Olympic Committee

Kuwait
- Country: Kuwait
- Code: KUW
- Created: 1957
- Recognized: 1966
- Continental Association: OCA
- Headquarters: Safat
- President: Sheikh Fahad Nasser Sabah Al-Ahmed Al-Sabah
- Secretary General: Mr Hussain Al Musallam

Kuwait Olympic Committee (Arabic: اللجنة الأولمبية الكويتية, IOC code: KUW) is the National Olympic Committee representing Kuwait and organising the Kuwait Olympic team.

== 2010–2012 suspension ==
The International Olympic Committee imposed a suspension on the committee with effect from 1 January 2010 due to government legislation that permits the state to interfere in elections of sporting organisations. The government had failed to meet the IOC's 31 December 2009 deadline for amending the legislation. As a result, Kuwait was barred from receiving IOC funding and its athletes and officials were banned from Olympic Games and Olympic meetings.

At the 2010 Summer Youth Olympics, the 2010 Asian Games, and the 2011 Asian Winter Games, Kuwaiti athletes competed as independent athletes in a team named "Athletes from Kuwait" (code: IOC) under the Olympic Flag.

On 14 July 2012 the suspension was lifted and Kuwaiti athletes were allowed to participate in the 2012 Summer Olympics under their own flag.

== 2015–2019 suspension ==
The Kuwait Olympic Committee was again suspended on 27 October 2015 by the IOC to protect the Olympic movement in Kuwait from undue government interference.

As a result of this suspension, participation by athletes from Kuwait at the 2016 Summer Olympics in Rio de Janeiro was allowed by the IOC in a special team named "Independent Olympic Athletes" (code: IOA) under the Olympic flag.

As a gesture of goodwill for the progress made by Kuwait to address the problem, the IOC temporarily lifted the suspension on 16 August 2018 and Kuwaiti athletes were allowed to participate in the 2018 Asian Games under their own flag.

The suspension was fully lifted in July 2019.

== See also ==
- Kuwait at the Olympics
- Athletes from Kuwait at the 2010 Summer Youth Olympics
- Athletes from Kuwait at the 2010 Asian Games
- Athletes from Kuwait at the 2011 Asian Winter Games
