= 1998 FIFA World Cup qualification (AFC–OFC play-off) =

- Event: 1998 FIFA World Cup qualification
Iran	Australia
(Iran)	(Australia)
3	3
- 3–3 on aggregate, Iran won on away goals

First leg
Iran	Australia
1	1
- Date: 22 November 1997
- Venue: Azadi Stadium, Tehran
- Man of the Match: Harry Kewell
- Referee: Pierluigi Pairetto (Italy)
- Attendance: 128,000

Second leg
Australia	Iran
2	2
- Date: 29 November 1997
- Venue: Melbourne Cricket Ground, Melbourne
- Man of the Match: Khodadad Azizi
- Referee: Sándor Puhl (Hungary)
- Attendance: 85,022

The 1998 FIFA World Cup AFC–OFC qualification play-off was a two-legged home-and-away tie between the winners of the Oceania qualifying tournament, Australia, and the losing team in the AFC play-off from the Asian qualifying tournament, Iran. The games were played on 22 and 29 November 1997 in Tehran and Melbourne respectively. Australia was hoping to play in the FIFA World Cup for the first time since 1974 and Iran in 1978.

== Background ==
Iran
Round
Australia

Team	Pld	W	D	L	GF	GA	GD	Pts
Saudi Arabia	8	4	2	2	8	6	2	14
Iran	8	3	3	2	13	8	5	12
China	8	3	2	3	11	14	−3	11
Qatar	8	3	1	4	7	10	−3	10
Kuwait	8	2	2	4	7	8	−1	8

Final standings

Team	Pld	W	D	L	GF	GA	GD	Pts
Australia	4	4	0	0	26	2	24	12
Solomon Islands	4	1	1	2	7	21	−14	4
Tahiti	4	0	1	3	2	12	−10	1

Opponent
Result
Final round
Opponent
Result
Japan (N)
2–3 (a.e.t.)
1st leg
New Zealand (A)
3–0
2nd leg
New Zealand (H)
2–0

== Play-off match ==
=== First leg ===
Prior to arrival in Tehran, Terry Venables and others involved in the Australian national team had made negative comments about Iran, stating it as being dangerous, and going so far as to bring their own drinking water for their stay.

The first leg of the play-off, on 22 November 1997, took place in Tehran, Iran, with the result a 1–1 draw. Attendance for this match was extremely high, as 128,000 fans packed Azadi Stadium, despite it only having a capacity for 100,000 fans at the time.

22 November 1997
21:10 (IRST)
First leg

Iran	1–1	Australia
Azizi 39'		Kewell 19'

Azadi Stadium, Tehran
Attendance: 128,000
Referee: Pierluigi Pairetto (Italy)

Iran
Australia

GK	1	Ahmad Reza Abedzadeh (c)
DF	2	Mehdi Mahdavikia
DF	4	Mohammad Khakpour	(yellow card) 40'
DF	16	Reza Shahroudi
DF	5	Afshin Peyrovani
MF	7	Ali Reza Mansourian		(substituted off) 65'
MF	9	Hamid Estili
FW	20	Mehdi Pashazadeh		(substituted off) 75'
FW	23	Naeim Saadavi
FW	11	Khodadad Azizi
FW	10	Ali Daei
Substitutions:
GK	22	Nima Nakisa
DF	15	Ali Akbar Ostad-Asadi
MF	8	Majid Namjoo-Motlagh
MF	25	Mehrdad Minavand
DF	24	Javad Zarincheh
FW	19	Farhad Majidi		(substituted on) 75'
MF	18	Ebrahim Tahami		(substituted on) 65'
Manager:
(Brazil) Valdeir Vieira

GK	1	Mark Bosnich
DF	4	Steve Horvat
DF	2	Craig Moore
DF	5	Alex Tobin (c)	(yellow card) 50'
MF	7	Robbie Slater		(substituted off) 58'
MF	6	Ned Zelic
MF	8	Craig Foster
MF	10	Aurelio Vidmar	(yellow card) 20'	(substituted off) 58'
MF	3	Tony Vidmar
FW	9	Mark Viduka
FW	11	Harry Kewell	(yellow card) 40'	(substituted off) 88'
Substitutions:
GK	22	Željko Kalac
	12	Milan Ivanović
	13	Stan Lazaridis		(substituted on) 58'
	14	Ernie Tapai	(yellow card) 85'	(substituted on) 58'
	15	Josip Skoko
	16	Graham Arnold		(substituted on) 88'
	17	John Aloisi
Manager:
(England) Terry Venables

OFFICIALS

- Assistant referees:
  - Salvatore Marano (Italy)
  - Pietro Contente (Italy)
- Fourth official: Stefano Braschi (Italy)

MATCH RULES

- 90 minutes
- 3 (of 7) substitutions permitted

=== Second leg ===
The second leg, held on 29 November at the Melbourne Cricket Ground, had a crowd of 85,022. With Australia holding a 1–0 lead at half-time and scoring a second goal just after the break, it looked likely that they would progress to the World Cup. Immediately following Australia's second goal, spectator Peter Hore, known for disrupting major events, ran onto the field and cut up Iran's goal net, causing a halt in play. However, Australia's dominance continued until a controversial booking of Harry Kewell following a collision with Iranian goalkeeper Ahmad Reza Abedzadeh in the 72nd minute. This seemed to quell the Australians' momentum, as an Iranian revival, led by Khodadad Azizi, saw Iran score two quick goals to make the score 3–3 on aggregate, with Iran progressing on away goals.

Despite being undefeated throughout their entire qualifying campaign, Australia had again failed to qualify for the World Cup finals. Along with host nation and eventual winner France (who as host nation did not need to qualify), and Saint Kitts and Nevis, Australia were one of three teams to not lose a game in the entire campaign. The broadcast of the game on SBS featured closing comments from a clearly distraught Les Murray and Johnny Warren, with Warren openly weeping on air. In 2000, coach Terry Venables said the game was "one of the saddest sporting moments of my life."

29 November 1997
20:15 (AEDT)
Second leg

Australia	2–2	Iran
Kewell 32'; A. Vidmar 48'	Report	Bagheri 76'; Azizi 80'

Melbourne Cricket Ground, Melbourne
Attendance: 85,022
Referee: Sándor Puhl (Hungary)

Australia
Iran

GK	1	Mark Bosnich
DF	4	Steve Horvat
DF	2	Craig Moore	(substituted off) 84'
DF	5	Alex Tobin (c)
DF	3	Stan Lazaridis
MF	7	Robbie Slater	(substituted off) 82'
MF	6	Ned Zelic
MF	8	Craig Foster
MF	10	Aurelio Vidmar	(substituted off) 82'
FW	11	Harry Kewell	(yellow card) 72'
FW	9	Mark Viduka
Substitutions:
GK	22	Zeljko Kalac
	12	Milan Ivanović
	19	Tony Vidmar	(substituted on) 82'
	14	Ernie Tapai	(substituted on) 82'
	15	Josip Skoko
	16	Graham Arnold	(substituted on) 84'
	17	John Aloisi
Manager:
(England) Terry Venables

GK	1	Ahmadreza Abedzadeh (c)
DF	4	Mohammad Khakpour	(yellow card) 29'
DF	5	Afshin Peyrovani
DF	20	Mehdi Pashazadeh
MF	23	Naeem Saadavi	(substituted off) 76'
MF	2	Mehdi Mahdavikia	(yellow card) 61'
MF	6	Karim Bagheri	(yellow card) 75'
MF	16	Reza Shahroudi	(substituted off) 58'
MF	9	Hamid Reza Estili
FW	11	Khodadad Azizi
FW	10	Ali Daei
Substitutions:
GK	22	Nima Nakisa
	15	Ali Akbar Ostad-Asadi	(substituted on) 90'
	8	Majid Namjoo-Motlagh
	25	Mehrdad Minavand
	24	Javad Zarincheh
	7	Ali Reza Mansourian	(substituted on) 58'
	18	Ebrahim Tahami	(substituted on) 76' (substituted off) 90' (yellow card) 88'
Manager:
(Brazil) Valdeir Vieira

OFFICIALS

- Assistant referees:
  - Imre Bozoky (Hungary)
  - Belo Mezo (Hungary)
- Fourth official: Attila Hanacsek (Hungary)

MATCH RULES

- 90 minutes
- 30 minutes of extra-time if necessary
- Penalty shoot-out if scores still level:
- 3 (of 7) substitutions permitted
