= SBS Sport =

Australian sports broadcasting service

- Launched: 1980; 46 years ago
- Division of: SBS Television
- Owner: Special Broadcasting Service
- Headquarters: Artarmon, New South Wales, Australia
- Major broadcasting contracts: FIFA World Cup; Dakar Rally; Tour de France
- Sister network: SBS TV; SBS2; NITV; SBS On Demand
- Official website: SBS Sport

SBS Sport is the Special Broadcasting Service's sport's programming broadcast on SBS Television and SBS Radio.

== Television & Streaming ==
SBS currently holds the broadcast rights to a range of sports, which are broadcast on SBS, SBS Viceland and NITV.

=== Current ===
Sport	Event	Broadcast Partner(s)	Term	Notes
Athletics	Paris Marathon		2024–	
Athletics	Sydney Marathon		2025–	
Cycling	Tour de France		1980–2030	
Cycling	Giro d’Italia		2021–2025	
Cycling	Vuelta a España		2010–2030	
Cycling	Paris-Roubaix		2021–2030	
Cycling	UCI Women’s Tour		2021–2025	
Cycling	Paris-Nice		2021–2030	
Cycling	Gent Wevelgem		2021–2024	
Cycling	Australia Road Nationals		2021–2023	
Cycling	Tour of Flanders		2021–2024	
Cycling	Liege-Bastogne-Liege		2021–2023	
Cycling	Strade Bianche		2021–2025	
Figure skating	ISU Figure Skating series	ESPN	2019–	
Football	FIFA World Cup	ABC (1982); Nine Network (2002); ESPN (2010); Optus Sport (2018)	1982–	
Football	FIFA ASEAN Cup		2026–present	All matches live
Football	OFC Professional League		2026–	South Melbourne games only
Football	Arabian Gulf Cup		2026–present	All matches live
Football	Taça de Portugal		2026–present	Up to three matches per-round live
Football	Asia-Pacific Cerebral Palsy Championships		2023–	
Football	Australian Championship		2025–	
Football	National Indigenous Football Championships		2022–	
Gymnastics	Gymnastics World Gymnastics Championships series		2022–2024	
Motorsport	Dakar Rally		2021–2022	
Motorsport	W Series		2021–2022	
Motorsport	24 Hours of Le Mans		2021–2022	
Motorsport	Australian Superbikes		2021–2022	
Motorsport	Superbikes World Championship		2021–2022	
Motorsport	ProMX		2021–2022	
Rugby league	Koori Knockout	Fox League (2022–present)	2009–present	
Rugby league	Murri Carnival	Fox League (2022–present)	2009–present	
Tennis	Kooyong Classic	Fox Sports	2019–2020, 2023–present	

=== Past ===
Sport	Event	Broadcast Partners(s)	Dates
Summer Olympics	Athens 2004, Beijing 2008	Seven Network (2004, 2008)	2004, 2008
American football	Super Bowl	ESPN	2003–2008
Athletics	World Athletics Championships		2022–2025
Athletics	World Athletics Relays		2022–2025
Athletics	Cross Country Championships		2022–2025
Athletics	Indoor World Championships		2022–2025
Athletics	IAAF Continental Cup		2022–2025
Athletics	IAAF Marathon Cup		2022–2025
Baseball	World Series	ESPN	2002
Basketball	FIBA Basketball World Cup	Fox Sports	2023
Basketball	FIBA Women's Basketball World Cup	Fox Sports	2022
Basketball	Boomers Internationals	Fox Sports	2019–2023
Basketball	Opals Internationals	Fox Sports	2019–2023
Basketball	National Basketball Association	Fox Sports	2019–2022
Basketball	Women's National Basketball Association	Fox Sports	2019–2022
Basketball	National Basketball League	Fox Sports	2016–2021
Basketball	Women's National Basketball League	Fox Sports	2016–2021
Cricket	The Ashes in England	Fox Sports	2005–2009
Cycling	UCI Track Cycling World Championships		2011–2021
Cycling	UCI Road World Championships		2011–2021
Cycling	Tour Down Under		1999–2011
Equestrian	FEI Jumping World Cup	ESPN	2016
Football	A-League	Fox Sports	2013–2017
Football	National Soccer League	C7 Sport	2002–2004
Football	FIFA Women's World Cup	Optus Sport (2019)	1995–2019
Football	Confederations Cup	Optus Sport (2017)	2001–2017
Football	Copa América	beIN Sports (2015–2019), Optus Sport (2021–2024)	2015–2021
Football	FIFA World Cup Qualifiers CONMEBOL		2024–2025
Football	FIFA Futsal World Cup	Fox Sports (until 2018)	2008–2024
Football	UEFA Futsal Champions League	Fox Sports (until 2018)	2016–2024
Football	International Champions Cup	beIN Sports	2018 & 2019
Football	Women's International Champions Cup	beIN Sports	2018 & 2019
Football	FIFA Arab Cup	ESPN	2021
Football	FIFA Beach Football World Cup	ESPN	2005–2017
Football	FIFA Club World Cup	ESPN	2000–2016
Football	Asia-Pacific Cerebral Palsy Championships		2023
Football	Ballon d'Or	ESPN	2021–2023
Football	English Premier League	Fox Sports (1993–2007), Optus Sport (2016–2019)	1993–2000, 2016–2019
Football	Italian Serie A		1990–2002, 2016–2018
Football	Matildas Internationals	Fox Sports (2001–2015), ABC (2018–2019)	1997–2015, 2018–2019
Football	Socceroos Internationals	Fox Sports (1995–2013), ABC (2020–2021)	1981–2013, 2020–2021
Football	UEFA Champions League	beIN Sports	1980–2018
Football	UEFA Europa League	beIN Sports	2009–2014
Football	UEFA European Football Championship	beIN Sports (2016)	2012–2016
Football	UEFA Women's Champions League	beIN Sports	2019–2020
Football	W-League	Fox Sports (2017–2019)	2017–2019
Football	FIFA U-20 World Cup		2003–2025
Football	FIFA U-20 Women's World Cup		2008–2022
Football	FIFA U-17 World Cup		2003-2023
Football	FIFA U-17 Women's World Cup		2008–2022
Football	CONMEBOL Recopa		2012–2018
Football	UEFA Super Cup	ESPN	2002–2018
Football	FA Cup	ESPN	2012–2018
Football	DFB-Pokal	ESPN	2012–2018
Football	Coppa Italia	ESPN	2016–2020
Football	Copa del Rey	ESPN	2016–2020
Football	National Indigenous Football Championship		2022
Football	NSL Cup		1993–1997
Football	Chatham Cup		2013–2017
Football	Chinese Super League		2021–2023
Football	Indian Super League		2021–2023
Football	Super League	One Football	2021–2023
Football	FA Cup Women's	One Football	2021–2023
Football	Frauen-Bundesliga	One Football	2021–2023
Football	DFB-Pokal Frauen Women's	One Football	2021–2023
Football	Serie A Femminile	One Football	2021–2023
Football	Super Coppa Italiana Women’s	One Football	2021–2023
Football	La Liga de Fútbol Femenino	One Football	2021–2023
Football	Copa de la Reina Women's	One Football	2021–2023
Football	Major League Soccer	Apple TV	2025
Ice hockey	Ice Hockey World Championships	ESPN	2004
Motor racing	TCR Australia Touring Car Series		2020
Motor racing	Sandown 500		1992–1995
Motor racing	Australian Off Road Championship		2020
Netball	ANZ Championship	Fox Sports	2013–2014
Rugby league	Indigenous All Stars	Facebook Watch	2009–2016
Rugby Union	Wallabies Spring Tour	Fox Sports	2016–2018
Tennis	French Open	Fox Sports	2018–2020
Tennis	US Open	Fox Sports	2018–2020

=== Sports News Programs ===
- On The Ball
- The World Game
- Toyota World Sport
- The Woggabaliri Footy Show
- Thursday FC
- The Barefoot Sports Show
- Over the Black Dot
- SBS Speedweek
- Cycling Central

== Awards ==
Sports coverage and programs made by SBS Sport have been won and been nominated for several awards at the Logie Awards. They include:

- Logie Awards of 1998: Won the Most Outstanding Sports Coverage for the Australia v Iran World Cup Qualifier
- Logie Awards of 1999: Nominated in the Most Outstanding Sports Coverage for the FIFA World Cup
- Logie Awards of 1999: Nominated for the Most Outstanding Sportscaster (to: Les Murray)

== See also ==
- ABC Sport
- Seven Sport
- Nine's Wide World of Sports
- 10 Sport
- Fox Sports (Australia)
- Stan Sport
- beIN Sports (Australia)
- Paramount+ Sports
