= The World Game =

- Genre: Sports
- Presented by: Les Murray (2002–2014); Lucy Zelić (2015–2019)
- Country of origin: Australia
- Original language: English
- No. of seasons: 17

Production
- Running time: 60 minutes

Original release
- Network: SBS
- Release: 15 September 2002 – 2019

The World Game was an Australian football (soccer) television show broadcast on the SBS network, as well as a dedicated associated website. The show debuted in September 2002 and was the only Australian TV program dedicated to both football news and issues within Australia as well as around the world. Its popularity led to the launch of an associated website the following year. The TV show was dropped in 2019, whilst the website closed in 2021, and merged with the core SBS Sport website.

== Presenters and panelists ==
=== Main presenters ===
- Les Murray (2002–2014)
- Lucy Zelić (2015–2019)

=== Chief analyst ===
- Johnny Warren (2002–2004)
- Craig Foster (2004–2019)

=== Analysts and panelists ===
- Francis Awaritefe
- Stephanie Brantz
- Mieke Buchan
- Branko Culina
- Liz Deep-Jones
- Simon Hill (now at Paramount+)
- Zeljko Kalac
- Scott McIntyre (sacked from SBS after controversial ANZAC Day tweets)
- Paul Okon
- Andrew Orsatti (now Communications Director and Spokesman at FIFPro)
- Anthony Peridis
- Tony Palumbo
- Rale Rasic
- Tim Vickery
- David Zdrilic
- Ned Zelic
- Paul Williams
- Damien Lovelock

== Guest appearances ==
- Michael Bridges
- Patrick Zwaanswijk
- David Basheer

== History ==
The show first aired in 2002, succeeding the long-running On the Ball, and started out as a live 6-hour show, airing on Sunday afternoons. It was then shortened to a 3-hour show a few years later. Its popularity caused the brand to later grow to comprise a popular website as well as other digital content. Its original presenter was the late Les Murray, which was already the face of SBS' popular FIFA World Cup coverage, and did so for over 30 years before his retirement in 2014. The show's chief football analyst was the late Johnny Warren until his death in 2004. Murray and Warren were Australia's pre-eminent soccer commentary team, becoming very famous being the hosts of On the Ball, and well known to soccer fans as "Mr and Mrs Soccer"; as a result, they were held over as presenters of the new show. After Warren's death, ex-Socceroo Craig Foster took over as the chief football analyst.

From 2 August 2010, the show was moved to Monday nights, on SBS Two live at 9.30pm AEST, and is repeated soon after on SBS One at 11.00pm AEST. This allowed for wider coverage of the football events from the weekend prior. The show was also shortened to one-hour episodes.

At the same time, they show added a new number of contributors: Tony Palumbo, a seasoned journalist with the Italian migrant press in Australia, assists in providing some insights on major European leagues, primarily the English Premier League and Italian Serie A. Some footage is provided from Spain's La Liga, France's Ligue 1, Scotland's Scottish Premier League, South America's Copa Libertadores and Germany's Bundesliga. UEFA Champions League, UEFA Cup, other cup games and internationals (European Championship) also get game footage; mainly the Champions League. Former Sydney FC coach Branko Culina is a regular contributor on discussion relating to Australian football. On 1 November 2012 SBS bought the rights to show one live A-League game per week, with the remainder going to pay TV provider Fox Sports. They will also broadcast the Socceroos' World Cup qualifiers on one-hour delay with Fox Sports showing them live.

From August 2013, the show was retooled as a half-hour weekly Monday night show airing on SBS One. The new format now offers a wide coverage of Australian and international football events from the week prior, augmented with analysis and reaction from the show's experts.

After a brief hiatus in 2014–15, the show was once again retooled for the 2015–16 season, as a one-hour talk show edition on Sunday afternoon at 1pm. Due to Murray's retirement, Lucy Zelić took over as the programme's new presenter, with Foster remaining as chief analyst.

In 2019, after 17 seasons, the TV show was quietly dropped, and the brand was transitioned to focus on their digital platforms, but the show's podcast remained, broadcast through The World Game website. In 2021, as part of a streamlining of their digital operations, SBS announced that it was shutting down The World Game website, merging all soccer content within the SBS Sport website. As the site was the only soccer website which catered to Australian fans, the move received heavy backlash. SBS would still provide soccer coverage using The World Game brand, including the 2022 FIFA World Cup, on the SBS TV channel and through the SBS On Demand streaming platform.

Guests on the program have included Ledley King, Scott Jamieson, Shane Smeltz, Kevin Muscat, Corey Gameiro, Nick Montgomery, Marcos Flores, Vítor Saba, Luke Casserly and Archie Thompson.

== Special editions ==
The World Game team responsible for the weekly regular show, also present major football events including the FIFA Club World Cup, FIFA Beach Soccer World Cup, UEFA European Football Championship, UEFA Champions League, UEFA Europa League and major European Cup finals including The FA Cup, DFB Pokal and Copa del Rey. A pre-match preview, half time and post-match review is typically given by the various presenters.

== In other media ==
=== Website ===
The World Game website was a popular football news website run as an adjunct to the TV program. At one point, it used to include a forum called The World Game Forum, which has since ceased activity. Commonly referred to by the abbreviation TWGF, the forum was one of the more popular football forums in Australia. It had over 18,000 members, who have contributed to over 800,000 articles. The website was first established in July 2002, and closed in April 2021 as part of SBS's streamlining of their digital operations. It was then merged within the SBS Sport website.

=== Podcast ===
The World Game Podcast started 6 June 2011. The podcast sees a variety of guests talk the week in Australian and international football.

=== App ===
The World Game app, available from the iTunes Store, was SBS’s first mobile application. It received more than 25,000 downloads in its first week of release. The app provided a live score and result service with the addition of video highlights, news and content from The World Game team.

== Awards ==
In 2008, the program was nominated for a Logie Award in the 'Most Popular Sports Program' award category. It lost out to The AFL Footy Show.

== See also ==
- List of Australian television series
- List of programs broadcast by Special Broadcasting Service
- List of longest-running Australian television series
- Thursday FC
