= Simon Hill =

Australian television presenter

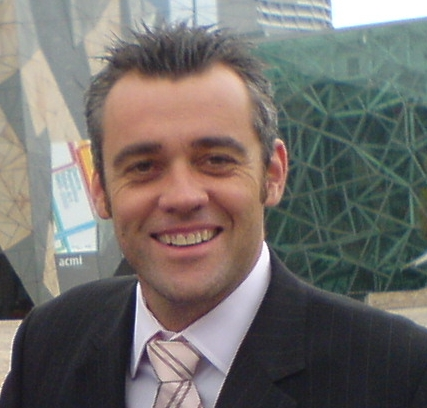
- Hill in 2007
- Born: 1 November 1967 (age 58); Manchester, England, United Kingdom
- Occupation: Football broadcaster

Simon Hill (born 1 November 1967) is an English football commentator. He is also a musician and vocalist, specialising on the drums. He plays in several bands.

Hill studied journalism at the University of Portsmouth, graduating in 1990. His first job was at Red Dragon FM, a radio station in Cardiff, Wales. Hill later worked for BBC World Service and BBC Radio 5 Live before becoming a football correspondent for ITV Sport.

Having spent most of his career in Australia, he has been dubbed "the voice of Australian Football" due to his contributions to the game in the country.

== Career ==
=== BBC World Service (1995–2002) ===
Hill worked as a commentator and reporter for the BBC World Service, covering the 1995 Intercontinental Cup in Japan in addition to major international tournaments such as UEFA Euro 1996, the 1998 African Cup of Nations and the 1998 FIFA World Cup.

=== ITV Sport Channel (2002) ===
Hill briefly worked for ITV Studios as a reporter for the First Division, now known as the EFL Championship, along with the UEFA Champions League.

=== SBS Television Australia (2003–2006) ===
Hill joined SBS Sport in Australia following a decade working in radio and television in the United Kingdom. He was a reporter at the 2004 Summer Olympics, and also hosted SBS' Ashes Cricket coverage in 2005, when Australia toured England. Hill commentated select National Soccer League matches, including the last NSL Grand Final. Hill commentated Australia's 2006 FIFA World Cup qualification matches, including the two-legged play-off against Uruguay.

He also commentated Australia's matches at the 2006 FIFA World Cup, and regularly featured as a panellist on Toyota World Sport and The World Game. Hill has not since commentated at a FIFA World Cup due to contractual obligations with Fox Sports Australia and Paramount Australia.

=== Fox Sports Australia (2006–2020) ===
On 29 July 2006, Hill joined Fox Sports Australia on a three-year deal as its main commentator for the network's A-League and Socceroos matches. Hill would also appear on Total Football, Fox Sports' weekly football show. Upon joining the network, Hill said that "For any true follower of football, Fox Sports is an absolute must, and for me it's a great fit." Hill would serve as the network's lead commentator for Australia's 2010, 2014 and 2018 FIFA World Cup qualifying campaigns, along with the 2007, 2011, 2015 and 2019 Asian Cups. Hill was also a monthly contributor to Australian football magazine FourFourTwo. Hill commentated Fox Sports' feed of the A-League Grand Final from 2007 to 2019.

Due to the COVID-19 pandemic, Football Australia postponed the remainder of the 2019–20 A-League season. After 14 years at Fox Sports, Hill was made redundant in July 2020, claiming he was "removed" from the network after a host of cost-cutting measures. During the pandemic, Hill struggled to find commentary work in Australia, going as far to admit that "part of the reason I’m still in Australia is because of the global pandemic [...] Had that not been the case, I might have been back in the UK." Many Australian football fans and pundits expressed dismay at the state of Hill's employment.

=== Freelance work (since 2020) ===
In May 2020, Hill briefly worked as commentator for the K League world feed. He described the arrangement as "a really positive experience all-round."

In his absence for the remainder of the postponed 2019–20 A-League season, Hill was the Newcastle Jets home ground announcer. Hill would later state how "Newcastle Jets have been very good to me [...] I thank them for that. Other clubs like Sydney FC have given me bits of work. I’ve had work from Football Queensland, Football Australia.

In August 2020, Hill announced a freelance affiliation with Optus Sport, joining the network as a commentator on their UEFA Champions League and UEFA Europa League broadcasts. Over several months, he appeared in their match day podcasts and provided a weekly column on the website. Hill commentated the network's feed of the 2020 UEFA Champions League final, before leaving shortly after.

Hill briefly hosted The Global Game with former Australian footballer Alex Brosque on the SEN Sydney 1170 radio network. After leaving Fox Sports, Hill provided an A-League commentary feed for SEN for the remainder of the 2019–20 A-League season.

Hill was a world feed commentator for the 2023 FIFA Women's World Cup, covering matches in Melbourne, Auckland and Brisbane.

Since leaving Australia in 2025, Hill continues to contribute to Australian football media, writing via Football360.com.au. In 2026, appeared as "British Announcer" in the comedy film Balls Up.

=== Paramount Australia (2021–2025) ===
In August 2021, Hill joined Paramount Australia to commentate on the Socceroos, Matildas, and A-Leagues competitions. He was the network's lead commentator for the 2022, 2023 and 2025 A-League Men Grand Finals, in addition to the Socceroos' 2022 FIFA World Cup intercontinental play-off qualification match against Peru. In May 2025, Hill announced his departure from Paramount Australia to return to the United Kingdom.

== Personal life ==
Hill was born in Manchester to Audrey and George. He is a Manchester City F.C. supporter.
