= The Football Sack =

Australian-based media organisation

The Football Sack is an Australian-based media organisation dedicated to association football. Its services include a news and opinion website, a weekly podcast, live text match commentary on Twitter and viral internet videos. The Football Sack rose to prominence after Australian Soccer legend Craig Foster mentioned them on The World Game and have since gone on to win 'Football Podcast of the Year' in the inaugural FFDU Australian Football Media Awards, defeating FourFourTwo (Australia) and The World Game in the process.

== Website ==
Unlike many football websites, The Football Sack focuses solely on Australian football. The two main leagues it covers is the A-League and the W-League as well as covering the Socceroos and the Matildas. During the A-League off-season The Football Sack also covers various State Leagues including the NSW Premier League, Victorian Premier League, Queensland State League, Brisbane Premier League, South Australian Super League and the Football West State League. It also covers major tournaments such as the FIFA World Cup and the AFC Asian Cup.

== Podcast ==
The Football Sack Podcast first aired on iTunes on 10 June 2010 with hosts Jack Quigley and Christian Layland. Brought in specifically to cover the 2010 FIFA World Cup the program was popular enough to warrant its continuation for the 2010–11 A-League season, ultimately making it to number one on iTunes for Australian sporting podcasts. The show's popularity was rewarded when it received the award for Football Podcast of the Year at the FFDU Australian Football Media Awards.

At the conclusion of the 2010-11 A-League season the program changed its structure with two new hosts, Matthew Greenlaw and Pete Nowakowski, adding a stronger focus on state league football – in particular the NSW Premier League. As of June 2011, in cooperation with Southern Cross University the original hosts returned and now work in tandem with Greenlaw, Nowakowski and Michal Roucek (who was added to the panel during the season) to record two separate podcasts each week. The Football Sack Podcast is currently ranked 4.5 stars on iTunes.

== Awards ==
FFDU Australian Football Media Awards

- Won
  - Best use of Social Media 2012/13
  - Best use of Social Media 2011/12
  - Football Podcast of the Year 2011/12
  - Football Podcast of the Year 2010/2011
- Finalist
  - Football Podcast of the Year 2012/13
  - Football Website of the Year 2012/2013
  - Football Website of the Year 2011/2012
  - Football Website of the Year 2010/2011
  - Best use of Social Media 2010/2011

Football New South Wales

- NSW Premier League Media Organisation of the Year 2011

Southern Cross University

- Excellence in the Arts 2011
