= Mieke Buchan =

Australian television and radio presenter, writer and producer

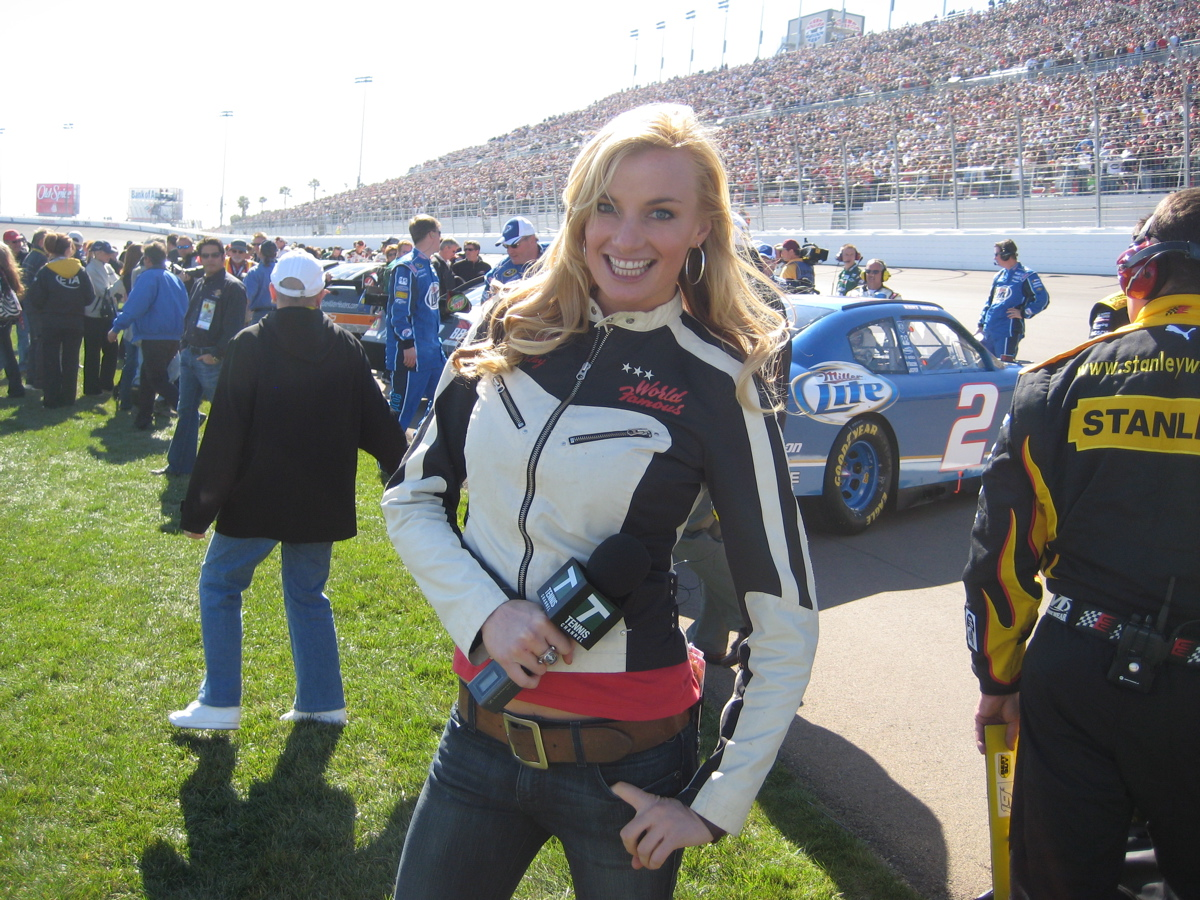
Mieke Buchan

Mieke Buchan (pronounced me-ka) is an Australian television and radio presenter, writer and producer, born in Brisbane, Australia. She has covered major events including: The Olympics, the US Open Tennis, 5 Super Bowls, Formula One, the Red Bull Air Race World Championship and the Oscars. She has worked for American and Australian television networks, including FOX Sport America, ESPN, SBS and Encore Movie Networks.

== Early life ==
After growing up in the leafy northern suburbs of Sydney, Australia, she majored in Film and Television Production in her BA Communications degree at University of Technology, Sydney, and also competed in netball in the Australian University Games.

== Career ==
=== 1999 ===
Buchan became widely known in Australia for hosting the weekend edition of SBS One's Toyota World Sport, as well as appearing on various other sports, travel and entertainment shows on Fox Sports, Network Ten (Beauty and the Beast) and the National Geographic Channel (Sports Sunday). Along with anchoring Toyota World Sport, her work at SBS included daily updates for their FIFA World Cup coverage, and hosting breaking international soccer news and results on football programs The World Game and On the Ball. Mieke also wrote, produced and presented the weekly sports series, Australian Horse Sports for SBS.

In 1998, Buchan got her first taste of live radio, at FBI radio, hosting a weekly pop-culture show, and then hosted the breakfast slot at Telstra's Basement.com.au live-streaming music station (1999–2002).

=== 2000 ===
Mieke hosted several shows for Fox8 in Australia (2000–2002), including Entertainment Extra (for which she interviewed Anthony Hopkins, Susan Sarandon, Ashton Kutcher, Pierce Brosnan, Matt Damon and others). She also presented short-form travel series Postcards from Paradise, Chain Reaction, and co-hosted national survey special, Are You Good in Bed?. Buchan also worked the red carpet for Foxtel's coverage of the Aria Awards, with Molly Meldrum. Despite not appearing on a prime-time free-to-air program, Buchan managed to earn a Logie Nomination in the viewer voted 'Most Popular New Female' category, in 2002. Sports Sunday for National Geographic allowed Mieke to not only host, but also produce, cast and write this 8 part short-form series.

=== 2003–2008 ===
Between 2003 and 2008 Buchan lived and worked in Los Angeles, where she continued to cover the world's largest sports and entertainment events on networks including ABC, ESPN, Fox Sports Net, Encore, and the Tennis Channel. Buchan also co-wrote and presented weekly film review show, Previews for The Soundtrack Channel, for over 5 years (250+ episodes). Her work with STC included several network specials, such as her feature interview with Kevin Costner at the Hollywood Sunset Ranch for the special edition release of "Out on the Range". She was presenter/host of the Pro-Am Poker Equalizer (ABC/ESPN), Celebrity Poker Pro-Am, and Poker at the Plaza (both for Fox Sports). Buchan was a correspondent on sports interview series, Head to Head, also for Fox Sports, and appeared on the network as a correspondent on nightly sports talk show, Best Damn Sports Show. During this time, Buchan was also the on-field correspondent for five Super Bowls, for her home network of SBS, back in Australia. Encore Channels also hired Mieke to host their annual movie awards specials.

=== 2004 ===
In 2004, Mieke was announced as the face of the new American network, Tennis Channel. In addition to live, major event broadcasting duties, Buchan helmed international sports-travel series, Destination. This saw her road-testing the best sports resorts in the world, while diving into the best food and wine each region had to offer. Locations included Austria, Switzerland, Spain, Andalusia (Spain), New York (United States), South Carolina (United States), Thailand, Montreal (Canada), Cabo San Lucas (Mexico), Australia, and Carmel. Destination was produced for the Tennis Channel and distributed to sports networks all over the world. She also hosted the ATP/WTA Awards nights specials, The US Open Players Party specials and tournament location travel specials such as "Off the Strip with Mieke Buchan". During this time Mieke developed a reputation as an intuitive and powerful interviewer. Her interviewees include Serena Williams, Roger Federer, Rafael Nadal, Martina Navratilova and Maria Sharapova.

When Buchan was not on the road, she volunteered she at Indie MTV station, M+TV, where she produced and hosted the live 3-hour viewer request show V2R. Based in East LA, this network reached into the local community to support local musicians and performers, and train young people in disadvantaged neighbourhoods in practical media skills.

=== 2008 ===
In early 2008, Buchan moved her home-base to London. Over the following year and a half, she hosted the Red Bull Air Race World Series for Fox Sports America, in locations that included Budapest (Hungary), Porto (Portugal), and London. She also continued to host and co-produce Tennis Channel's Destination as it travelled throughout locations including Switzerland, Austria, Spain and Thailand.

=== 2009–2011 ===
In mid-2009 she returned to Australia to co-host The Hot Breakfast radio show with Eddie McGuire on Triple M in Melbourne, until August 2011. During this time, Buchan also hosted Australian road-trip travel series, Making Tracks. The series aired nationally on Channel 10, on Saturday afternoons. During this period, she was a weekly segment contributor on Channel 10 morning show Dave and Kim, in which she debated and discussed the topical news stories of the day.

=== 2012–2015 ===
Buchan co-hosted BigPond's sports panel chat show SportsFan Clubhouse, with Bill Woods, Matt Bourke, Brad Fittler and special guests from the world of international and Australian sports. This aired live Monday – Thursday, 8pm. She also became a weekly contributor to the Channel Seven's Morning "Show Buzz" segment, in which she again shared views and opinions on the topical news stories of the day.

In August 2012 Buchan opened the doors of TV and online content production company, Randomonium Pictures (www.randomonium.com.au). This collective of media professionals produced and directed TV and online projects for a range of travel, banking, technology and sports clients.

- The doors closed in 2017 when Buchan's talk back radio commitments took over.

=== 2013 ===
Big Pond Movies appointed Buchan as the host of their movie preview and interview programming. Her first interview was with Thor's Tom Hiddleston (Loki) for the release of Thor: The Dark World. Other interviewees include; Chris Hemsworth, Dwayne Johnson, and Kit Harington from Game of Thrones.

Mieke also joined the cast of ABC Grandstand's quirky podcast series, "The Left Field".

=== 2016 ===
From 2016 she began contributing to Bill Wood's 2UE radio Drive program in a sports segment called "Buchan the Trend"

=== 2017 ===
Mieke joined Macquarie Radio on a more regular basis, contributing to 2UE'/Talking Lifestyle and filling as a co-host on Drive. In the summer of 2017-2018 she co-hosted 5 weeks of Breakfast radio on the network with Rob Duckworth. She also co-hosted Summer Saturday with Mark Levy on 2GB/4BC.

=== 2018 ===
2UE/Talking Lifestyle became Macquarie Sports Radio and Buchan was offered the Monday to Friday Afternoon show hosting role. She co-hosted midday-4pm for the following 9 months and then moved to midday-2pm Monday to Friday + Saturday Mornings 7am – 1pm. These programs were loosely based around sports news and events but also highlighted Mieke's trademark humour and off-the-cuff style. She also co-hosted several weeks of Summer Breakfast and Drive throughout the year. In August 2018 she did an outside broadcast while running the Sydney City to Surf fun run.

=== 2019 ===
Mieke's co-hosting/producing role at Macquarie Sports Radio continued, plus she joined the 2GB/4BC Afternoons show with Steve Price as a daily contributor.

She also appeared as a guest contributor on programs including Channel Ten's "The Project" and 3AW Drive with Tom Elliot.

- Macquarie Sports Radio was taken over by Nine Radio in December 2019 at which time Mieke left the network.

=== 2020 ===
Buchan founded community-focussed media advisory and content creation collective "The Get Good" www.thegetgood.com – while working on her Psychology degree at the University of Tasmania. She is regularly called up to ghost-write speeches for prominent community and sporting figures.

- Throughout her career, Mieke has continued her work as a contract brand and media consultant, an area she specialised in prior to TV and radio broadcasting. She has produced major national and international branded content projects and has assisted numerous community and charity groups (including The Murdoch Children's Research Institute and the McGrath Foundation) with their communication and campaign needs.

== Awards and nominations ==
- In 2003, she was nominated for a Logie Award in the Most Popular New Talent (Female) category.
