= Paul Williams (commentator) =

Paul Williams was an Australian soccer commentator for the Special Broadcasting Service (SBS) and the Seven Network. He is most famously known for commentating the 1998 FIFA World Cup intercontinental play-off qualifiers between Iran and Australia, for which SBS won a Logie Award. Williams commentated matches for SBS at the 1998 FIFA World Cup.

== Career ==
=== SBS Television Australia (1993-1999, 2001-2002) ===
In 1993, Williams joined SBS as commentator for the 1993 FIFA World Youth Championship, which was held in Australia. Williams would remain at the network, and eventually became its head commentator for the National Soccer League (NSL). Williams would later commentate at UEFA Euro 1996 for the network. Williams commentated Australia's 1998 FIFA World Cup qualification matches with Johnny Warren as his co-commentator. Williams regularly featured alongside Damien Lovelock on SBS' On The Ball and The World Game programs. While at SBS, Williams also commentated select Serie A matches. Williams was due to commentate for SBS at the 2002 FIFA World Cup before falling ill with depression and chronic fatigue syndrome.

=== Seven Network (1999–2003) ===
In 1998, Soccer Australia signed a ten-year contract with the Seven Network to broadcast all NSL and Socceroos matches on C7 Sport. Williams would join the network, commentating on Australia's 1999 friendly matches against Brazil. Williams later commentated Australia's 2000 Summer Olympics campaign before covering the 2002 FIFA World Cup intercontinental play-off qualifying series against Uruguay. Williams also commentated several high-profile friendlies including Australia's 1–1 draw with France in 2001, and a 2–1 loss to Ireland in 2003.

Following his withdrawal from full-time work, Williams presented a highlights package for the A-League, and hosted a football program on 2KY radio.

== Personal life ==
Williams lived in Sydney, and was a Liverpool F.C. supporter. He committed suicide, and was found dead in his home in October 2009. Damien Lovelock stated: "Paul was one of the nicest guys in this industry, and so talented. I respected him; I liked him and wish I got to know him better. What I knew, though, was that he loved his football [...] Paul hid his illness very well. Sadly. And he will be sadly missed by us all."
