= Tahami =

Tahami (Persian: تَهامی) is an Iranian surname that may refer to

- Ebrahim Tahami (born 1966), Iranian football midfielder
- Fakher Tahami (born 1996), Iranian football forward
- Hossein Tahami, Iranian freestyle wrestler

== See also ==
- Tahamí people in Colombia
