= Peter Hore (prankster) =

Australian-born man

Peter Hore is an Australian man best known for public stunts such as disrupting the 1997 Melbourne Cup by running onto the track during the race, interrupting a tennis match at the Australian Open, and gate-crashing celebrity funerals. He was labelled by the media a "serial pest".

During a World Cup football qualifying match between the national teams of Australia and Iran in 1997, Hore ran onto the field and cut the Iranian team's net, right after the second Australia's goal (scored by Aurelio Vidmar). According to ESPN FC, the resulting delay of eight minutes was a turning point in the match, allowing the Iranian team to "regain their cheer" and go on to qualify for the 1998 World Cup with a 2-2 draw that saw them advance in the away goals rule, resulting in the dramatic Australian elimination.

In 2007, Hore publicly told Queensland premier Anna Bligh that he would run for her seat in South Brisbane the following year. He ran against federal opposition leader Kevin Rudd in 2007 as an independent in the Division of Griffith, polling over 2,200 primary votes as "P.M. Howard" [John Howard being Prime Minister at the time].

In 2014, Hore was arrested for disrupting a hearing of the NSW Independent Commission Against Corruption. He pleaded not guilty to offensive behaviour and assaulting a law enforcement officer, after a struggle that left a special constable with head injuries. The court gave him 12-month good behaviour bond and a $600 fine.

== See also ==
- James Miller (parachutist), dubbed "Fan Man", known for paragliding into major sporting events
- Mark Roberts (streaker)
