= Bill Lovelock =

Australian songwriter and broadcaster (1922–2003)

- Born: William Lawrence Lovelock; 19 June 1922; Sydney, Australia
- Died: 8 August 2003 (aged 81); Ryde, Sydney, Australia
- Occupation(s): Songwriter, tv producer
- Children: Damien Lovelock (son)

William (Bill) Lawrence Lovelock was born in Sydney on 19 June 1922 and died in the North Sydney suburb of Ryde City on 8 August 2003. He was a songwriter and broadcaster with successes in Australia, Great Britain and the United States.

== Life ==
Bill Lovelock descended from a family originally from the English town of Wallingford who settled in the Sydney area in the 1860s. After acting as an intelligence reporter during World War 2, he was unsettled by the experience and unable to settle down to academic study. Instead, he began a career as musician and writer and had his first radio play, "Banshee", broadcast in the late 1940s. His biggest success was with the song "Snowy River, Roll!", which was written in support of the Snowy Mountains Scheme. Made "the official anthem of the Authority" and recorded by the band of the Royal Australian Air Force, it found its way into the Australian Broadcasting Corporation's School Song Book, and the antipodean Girl Guides' Song Book, to be sung by generations of youngsters.

Lovelock's work with Shirley Abicair also brought him success after he helped her collect folksongs to fit her repertoire. He was responsible for the lyrics of "Smiley", which she sang on the soundtrack of the film Smiley, as well as for her other great hit, "Little boy fishin’". He had also composed the music for another Australian film, The Phantom Stockman (alternatively known as Cattle Station or The Return of the Plainsman) in 1953. The connection with Shirley Abicair eventually took Lovelock to London, and from there he went on to work with Burl Ives in New York City. While in America he wrote one of Nina Simone’s early hits, "Chilly Winds, Don’t Blow" (1959). Later he was to work as one of the research directors for the television show Hollywood and the Stars (1963–4), and on his return to Sydney as executive producer of the Australian version of This Is Your Life (1975–80).

== Personal ==
In 1949 Bill Lovelock married Joan Marion Badcock, who under the name Joan Wilton was a singer and eventually had her own show on ABC radio. The marriage lapsed with Bill's move abroad. The couple divorced in 1961. Later he married Helen Peck Ehrlich, the divorced wife of Burl Ives. It was while working on This Is Your Life that he reconnected with his son by Joan, Damien, who later made a music and broadcasting career of his own.
