= Damien Lovelock =

Australian musical artist (1954–2019)

- Born: Damien Richard Lovelock; 21 May 1954; Amersham, England, United Kingdom
- Died: 3 August 2019 (aged 65); Sydney, Australia
- Occupations: Musician, sports broadcaster, writer
- Years active: 1980–2019
- Musical career
- Genre: Hard rock
- Years active: 1980–1992
- Label: Festival
- Writing career
- Genres: Sports and hobbies
- Subjects: Football; cookery
- Notable works: Soccer: Great Moments, Great Players in World Football

Damien Richard Lovelock (21 May 1954 – 3 August 2019), known familiarly as Damo, was an Australian musician, sports broadcaster and writer. He fronted the hard rock band The Celibate Rifles from 1980 as their lead singer-songwriter and later issued two solo albums. He was also a sports broadcaster, an author and yoga instructor.

== Life ==
Damien, the only child of songwriter Bill Lovelock and the singer Joan Wilton, was born in Amersham during the short while they were living in England. Soon after his mother's return, she was photographed with her son on a beach "teaching him to become an Australian". It was she too who encouraged him to compete in games and athletics at school. On Bill Lovelock's return to Australia, Damien reconnected with him amicably and worked as an office boy for his father's This Is Your Life show during the 1970s.

During his late teens and early twenties Lovelock had problems with drugs and alcohol before changing direction and completing a media studies degree at the New South Wales Institute of Technology (now the University of Technology Sydney). At that time he was already writing song lyrics before becoming the lead singer for the Celibate Rifles and putting that skill to practical use.

In later years he diversified his activities into sports journalism. Among other things, he was a contributor to the SBS show The World Game, briefly co-hosted ABC Radio Grandstand and also appeared on the weekly Football Fever on Sky Sports Radio, alongside Les Murray and others. Out of this experience grew two of the books he published: Soccer: Great Moments, Great Players in World Football (Allen & Unwin, 1996) and Damo's Bedside Guide to the World Cup (Scribe, 2006). After a spinal injury in 1995, Lovelock took up Ryoho yoga and eventually became an instructor in Newport on Sydney's Northern Beaches, which was eventually his main source of income. Because of his background, he was hired by several professional football teams, such as the Central Coast Mariners FC, Sydney FC and the New South Wales rugby league team.

Lovelock died from cancer at his Bilgola Plateau home on 3 August 2019. Although never married, Damien raised his son Luke (born on 9 June 1982) as a single parent. One result of that experience was another of his books, What's for Dinner Dad?: More Than 80 Easy, Fun Recipes for Desperate Dads (Random House Australia, 1995). Luke Lovelock had himself started a singing career before dying on 16 March 2020.

== Musical career ==
In 1980 Lovelock answered a 'Singer Wanted' advertisement for The Celibate Rifles, a recently formed rock group whose members were several years younger than him. "They had", he reminisced, "the sound I was looking for, and I gave them words different enough to match their unique high energy sonic assault." The lyrics were often coloured by his sardonic wit, encompassing the social commentary of "Tick Tock" (1983) on urban sprawl to the political satire of "Return of the Creature with the Atom Brain" (2004), Lovelock's comment on the American intervention in Iraq with British and Australian complicity.

Neither was he shy of recognising superior talent when he found it. The antimilitaristic "Salute", delivered in Lovelock's typically laconic manner over the threshing of the musicians on Beyond Respect (2004), was in fact a poem by Lawrence Ferlinghetti. Lovelock had substituted this for words of his own at the last moment when it came to recording since, as he explained, "It's one of those poems that once you read it you think 'why would I bother writing anything fresh about war when there is this perfect piece of work?'" In the background too was the influence of his father, with whom some of Lovelock's songs were co-written.

In 1988, Lovelock released his debut solo album, It's A Wig Wig Wig Wig World, on which he even abandoned the hard rocking sound to include a version of the gentler "Chilly Winds" that Bill Lovelock had written originally for Nina Simone. In 1990, Lovelock released the single, "Disco Inferno", and in 1991 Fishgrass, as well as the single "The Dalai Lama". The last of these was written as a result of his raising money for Tibetan refugees and led to Lovelock's meeting with the Dalai Lama on his visit to Australia in 1992. According to the singer, he suggested to His Holiness then "that one way of garnering great support for Tibet in their struggle for recognition on the world stage and to get a little of their share of human rights and (dare we say it) land back from their Chinese landlords, was to get a Tibetan soccer team to play in the World Cup".

The studio band recruited for these solo recordings was made up of musicians from several bands. Among them the bassist Rick Grossman was included for a special reason. Sympathising with Grossman from having gone the same journey as himself many years before, Lovelock supported and encouraged him while he was recovering from addiction to drink and drugs.

An earlier Lovelock recording came about during his relationship with the surfer Pam Burridge. In 1984 they appeared together on the single "Summer time all round the world" under the name Pam and the Pashions. It was from her international activities too that Lovelock got the idea to take The Celibate Rifles on tour abroad. The first of their visits to the US was in 1986 in the wake of a slump in public interest in the band at home. On a later occasion Lovelock got caught up in an armed bank raid in the Netherlands while on a European tour. Shot in the hand by a stray bullet, he still went onstage for that evening's performance.

== Musical tributes ==
Richard Davies paid Lovelock a good-natured tribute on his album Tonight's Music (2016). Titled simply "Damien Lovelock", it is a bravura piece of quadruple-rhyming parody.

Following Lovelock's death, The Celibate Rifles joined with his former Wigworld backing group and other colleagues to put on a performance in his memory in Sydney on 22 September 2019 under the title Damo, the Musical. In the following year the experimental jazz group The Necks dedicated to him the middle track of their Three under the title "Lovelock".

== Discography ==
=== Albums ===
List of albums, with selected details
Title	Album details
It's a Wig Wig Wig Wig World (Cracks in the Prism)	Released: 1988; Format: CD, LP, cassette; Label: Survival (SRLP05)
Fishgrass	Released: December 1991; Format: CD, cassette; Label: Festival Records (D30612)

=== Singles ===
List of singles, with selected details
Title	Year	Album
"Disco Inferno" (as Lovelock)	1990	non-album single
"The Dalai Lama"	1991	Fishgrass

== Resources ==
- ABC interview 2013
- Dan Condon, Gab Burke, "In tribute to Damien Lovelock", ABC net, 21 November 2019
- Christie Eliezer, "Vale Damien Lovelock of the Celibate Rifles", The Music Network, 5 August, 2019
- Mordue, Mark (14 August 2019). "Damien Lovelock: Celebrated rocker, TV personality and lover of pugs". The Sydney Morning Herald.
- Retropopic Interview, 2019
- Rolling Stone, November 1991, Damien Lovelock feature
