= Stephanie Brantz =

Australian sports presenter

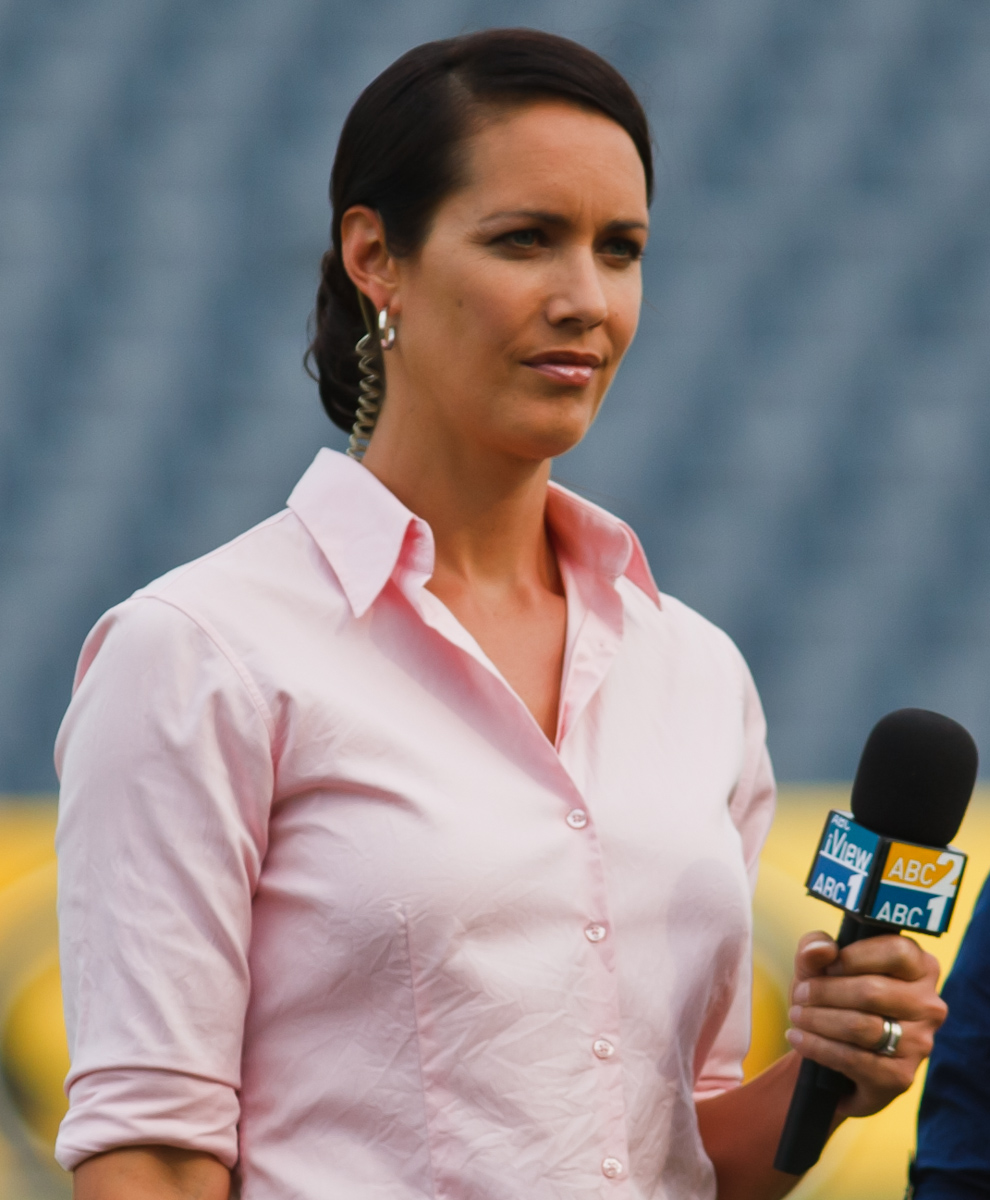
- Born: Stephanie Brantz; 1972 (age 53–54); Brisbane, Queensland, Australia
- Occupations: Sports Reporter for SBS (2000–2006), Nine Network (2006–2009), Fox Sports (2010), ABC TV (2010–present) ESPN Australia (2016–present), Fox Sports (2016–present)
- Years active: 2000–present
- Children: 3

Stephanie Brantz (born 1972) is an Australian sports presenter.

Brantz began her television career in 2000 on SBS (2000–2006), and has since worked on the Nine Network (2006–10), Fox Sports (2010) and is now on ABC (2010–present).

== Personal life ==
Brantz, born in Queensland to Dutch parents, began a modelling career in 1985 while attending St Peters Lutheran College in Indooroopilly, which continued through her time at Charles Sturt University. She has two sons and a daughter.

== Career ==
=== Television career ===
In 2000, she began her television presenting career with SBS where she became a presenter of On the Ball, before filling in as host of Toyota World Sports and later co-hosting the show in 2006 with Les Murray. She also became the face of SBS during their coverage of the 2006 FIFA World Cup.

In July 2006, just after the World Cup, Brantz was recruited by Nine CEO Eddie McGuire to front several sporting programmes, including Nine News, The Cricket Show, Sunday and The Footy Show.

During the 2006–2007 summer season, Brantz presented a weekly highlights show of the National Basketball League on the Nine Network, which began on 15 October 2006. She also did "analysis and roving reports" for the network's 2006–07 Ashes cricket coverage. On 19 February 2007, she was appointed the sports presenter on Nightline.

In 2010, she appeared on Fox Sports News reading sports news.

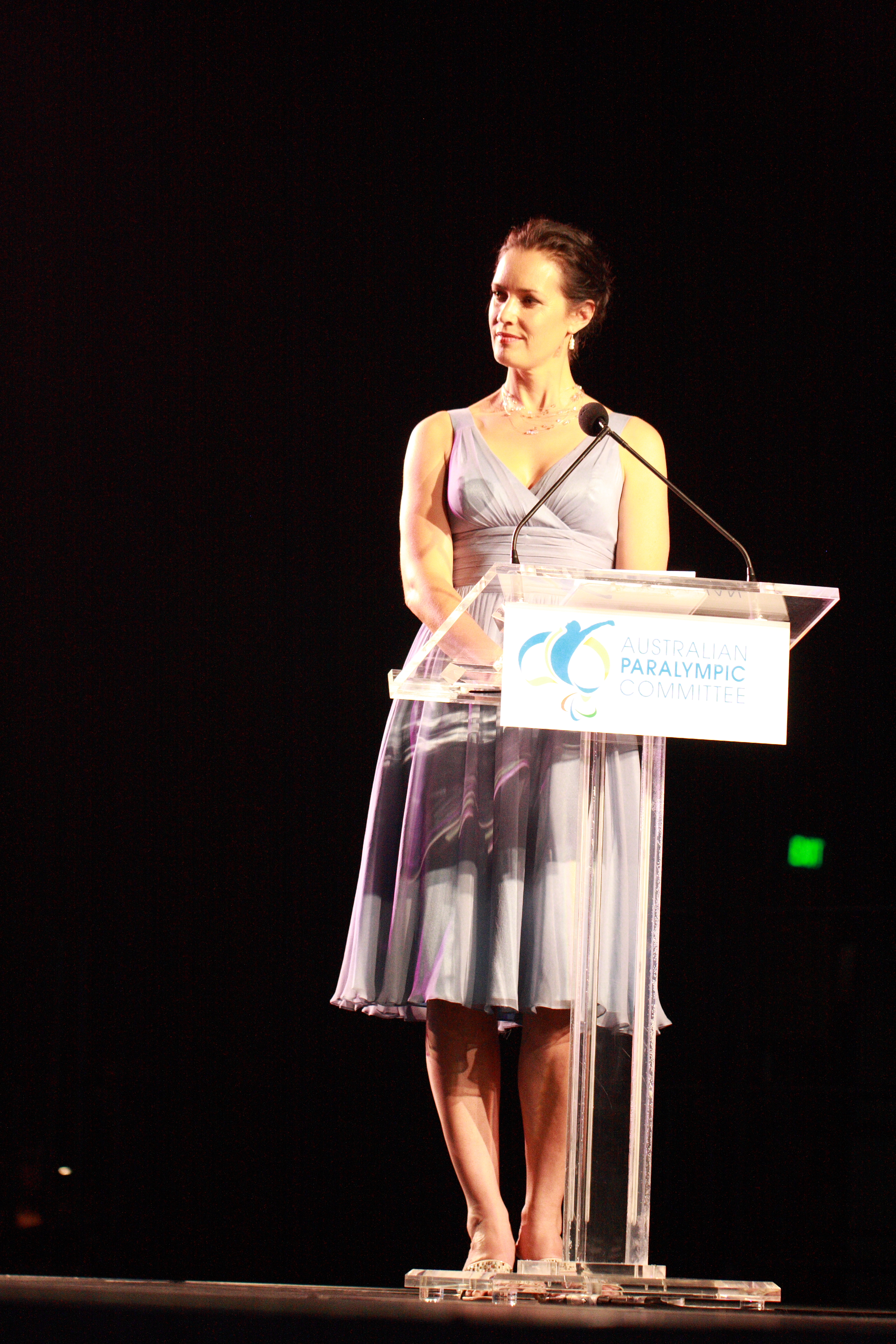
Brantz hosting the 2012 Australian Paralympian of the Year ceremony with live coverage on the ABC

From late 2010, Brantz joined ABC TV as sports presenter and host for the channel. At ABC, she was the host and 'side-line commentator' for the W-League (Australia) that airs on Sunday afternoons on the network and the WNBL that airs on Saturday afternoons. She was also the host for New South Wales viewers of the Shute Shield, as well as the international Hockey, Football, Golf and Basketball coverage.

Brantz has hosted the Anzac Day Dawn Service from Gallipoli in 2012–2015, hosted the Gallipoli Symphony and the 2015 Centenary Commemorations of the 'Battle for Lone Pine' as well as the Australian of the Year Awards and the Flag Raising and Citizenship Ceremony, also in the National Capital on Australia Day (2011–2017).

In 2012, she led the ABC's coverage of the London Paralympic Games. She also fronted the 2013 New Year's Eve coverage alongside Lawrence Mooney and the coverage of the 2015 Asian Cup.

In 2016, Brantz became a freelancer and took on lead commentary duties for the Westfield W-League with Fox Sports, joined ESPN as a regular contributor on their digital platform as well as presenting the US Open Primetime show from Flushing Meadows in 2017.

She has continued with the ABC, presenting their WWI commemorations from Villers-Bretonneux, Fromelles and Pozieres, Polygon Wood and Be’er Sheva as well as the Australia Day formalities in Canberra and the Australian Women's Open Golf coverage.

=== Other roles ===
As well as her on-air television duties, Brantz is presenter of a pre- and post-match function at the Sydney Cricket Ground and Sydney Football Stadium. At this event, she chats with various commentators from the sport being played at the time. She is also a corporate MC, facilitating conferences and awards nights.

Brantz is also an Ambassador and student mentor for the Australian Indigenous Education Foundation, an ambassador for the Chappell Foundation and was family ambassador of the Interactive Games & Entertainment Association.

== See also ==
- List of Nine Network presenters
