= Vaudeville Smash =

Australian funk, pop band

- Origin: Coburg, Victoria, Australia
- Genres: Funk
- Years active: 2009–present
- Label: Vaudeville Smash (independent)
- Members: Marc Lucchesi; Dan Lucchesi; Luca Lucchesi; James Bowers; Ash Griffin
- Website: vaudevillesmash.com

Vaudeville Smash are an Australian funk band from Coburg, Victoria who formed in 2009. The band consists of Marc Lucchesi, Dan Lucchesi, Luca Lucchesi, James Bowers and Ash Griffin.

The group rose to international attention after they collaborated with sports commentator Les Murray for their song "Zinedine Zidane", a tribute to the eponymous French football player. The song was named by Billboard as one of ten unofficial World Cup 2014 anthems.

== Band members ==
Current members

- Marc Lucchesi – Vocals, Sax, Flute
- Dan Lucchesi – Drums, Vocals
- Luca Lucchesi – Bass Guitar, Vocals
- James Bowers - Keyboards
- Ash Griffin – Guitar

== Discography ==
=== Studio albums ===
List of studio albums, with release date and label shown
Title	Album details
Dancing for the Girl	Released: 2 May 2013; Label: Vaudeville Smash (independent); Formats: Digital download, streaming
The Gift	Released: 24 August 2016; Label: Vaudeville Smash; Formats: Digital download, streaming
The Neverending Glory	Released: 1 April 2021; Label: Vaudeville Smash; Formats: Digital download, streaming

=== Extended plays ===
List of EPs, with release date and label shown
Title	EP details
Hey, It's the Vaudeville Smash	Released: 2 March 2010; Label: Vaudeville Smash; Formats: Digital download, streaming
Love Yachts Geronimo	Released: 26 April 2011; Label: Vaudeville Smash; Formats: Digital download, streaming
V-Grade Horror	Released: 15 October 2013; Label: Vaudeville Smash; Formats: Digital download, streaming

=== Singles ===
List of singles, with year released and album name shown
Title	Year	Album
"I Want You"	2011	Non-album singles
"Zinedine Zidane" (featuring Les Murray)	2014	Non-album singles
