= Hakeem al-Araibi =

Bahraini footballer (born 1993)

Personal information
- Full name: Hakeem Ali Mohammed Ali al-Araibi
- Date of birth: 7 November 1993 (age 33)
- Place of birth: Bahrain
- Position: Defender

Team information
- Current team: St Albans Saints
- Number: 2

Youth career
- 2009–2012: Al-Shabab

Senior career*
Years	Team	Apps	(Gls)
2012–2014	Al-Shabab		
2015	Green Gully	13	(1)
2016	Goulburn Valley Suns	24	(5)
2017	Preston Lions	13	(2)
2018–2021	Pascoe Vale	31	(3)
2022–	St Albans Saints	19	(1)

International career^{‡}
- Bahrain U23
2013	Bahrain	1	(0)
- * Club domestic league appearances and goals as of 17 November 2022 ‡ National team caps and goals as of 6 February 2019

Hakeem Ali Mohammed Ali al-Araibi (Arabic: حكيم العريبي; born 7 November 1993) is an Australian-Bahraini footballer who plays for St Albans Saints. He played for local club Al-Shabab and in the Bahraini national team before he fled as a dissident and refugee when the team was in Qatar in January 2014. He has played for various teams in Victoria since 2015, and since 2022 has played for St Albans Saints in NPL Victoria. He also holds a permanent position as Community and Human Rights Advocate with Football Victoria. He became an Australian citizen in 2019.

In November 2018, he was arrested on arrival in Thailand for a vacation from Australia, on the basis of an Interpol "red notice" issued by Bahrain. He was held there pending deportation to Bahrain, which he opposed. There was a campaign urging Thailand not to extradite him until 11 February 2019, when the Thai Office of the Attorney-General dropped the extradition case against him at Bahrain's request. He was returned to Australia the next day and became an Australian citizen shortly afterwards. The story of the campaign to free al-Haraibi is told in the 2023 documentary film The Defenders, by filmmaker Matthew Bate.

== Life and career in Bahrain ==
Hakeem Ali Mohammed Ali al-Araibi was born in Bahrain on 7 November 1993. He became a professional footballer there, playing as a defender for the Bahrain national football team and for local Manama club Al-Shabab. Al-Shabab spent years in Bahrain's top division and included a number of young players who had represented the country's various national youth teams. Al-Araibi was one of these, playing for Bahrain's Olympic team.

As a 15-year-old in 2009, he had been spotted playing by a school teacher, whose suggestion to a local scout brought him to the attention of the Bahrain Football Association (BFA). In 2010 he was called up to the Under-17 squad. He was overjoyed, and saw the national teams as symbols of unity between the Shia and Sunni populations of the country.

In 2009 his family lived in Jidhafs, a few kilometres west of Manama. He has a brother, Emad, who is as of February 2019 imprisoned in Bahrain for the same offence as that with which Hakeem is being charged. Emad had come to the attention of authorities as an activist before the 2011 Bahraini uprising during the Arab Spring, and one night at the end of 2011 police turned up at the family home at 3am, looking for him. As Emad was not there, they took Hakeem, accused him of burning tyres, which he denied, and held him for three months, until February 2011 and the uprising was under way.

The BFA (then headed by Sheikh Salman), targeted Al-Shabab, being a Shia club, and for almost a year after the revolution there was no football there. Eventually they demoted the club to the second division.

After his arrest and detention in November 2012, Hakeem returned to play for Al-Shabab and in late 2013 was called up for the senior national team by the newly appointed English coach, Anthony Hudson.

In November 2013 al-Araibi travelled with the national team to Qatar for the 2014 West Asian Football Federation Championship, where the team drew 0–0 with Iraq on 28 December 2013.

== Dissent and conviction ==
Al-Araibi spoke out against the persecution and torture of other footballers who had demonstrated against the ruling regime during the Bahraini uprising of 2011 (which was mostly led by Bahrain's majority Shia, as is al-Araibi, whilst the ruling family is Sunni).

On his 19th birthday on 7 November 2012, walking on his way to a café in Bahrain, he was picked up by Bahraini security forces. They accused him of vandalising a police station four days earlier, based on the supposed confession of his brother Emad, who allegedly told them that Hakeem had been part of a crowd of protesters who set upon the building with Molotov cocktails.

The next day Al-Araibi told the public prosecutor he had been playing in a televised football match when the attack took place and denied the allegations. But his detention was extended for 45 days, during which he says security forces tried to torture a confession out of him. He told German broadcaster ARD "They spent three hours hitting me hard on my legs, while saying we will break your bones, we will destroy your future, you will never play football again with these legs." He was then released on bail.

=== Details of alleged offence and the prosecution case ===
After fleeing the country, al-Araibi was tried in absentia for vandalism of Al Khamees police station in Manama on 3 November 2012, when, according to police, a mob of 150 people had attacked the building, throwing Molotov cocktails and smashing windows, which he denies, and sentenced to ten years in prison. Amnesty International describe this trial as "unfair". The alleged vandalism was said to have taken place at around the time that al-Araibi was playing in a televised football match.

The time of the attack on the police station is key to Hakeem Al-Arabi's alibi. His brother said the attack took place at 6.30 pm, but Hakeem was playing in a nationally televised game for his club Al-Shabab at the Al-Muharraq Stadium from 5.30 pm to 7.20 pm, with the Bahrain Football Association, the Al-Shabab club and fellow players confirming this. Footage from the game broadcast by Bahrain Sports Channel 1 showing al-Araibi playing was also submitted. However prosecution said that the mob had gathered earlier and the attack had taken place at 8 pm and that Hakeem would have had enough time to leave the stadium after finishing the match and take part in it 40 minutes later. The Al Khamees police station is 20 km south-west of the stadium, across on the other side of the city, and it was a Saturday night.

The entire case being brought by Bahrain is based on the alleged confession by his brother Emad to Bahraini police, which led to Emad's imprisonment. BIRD has said that Emad's testimony was obtained through physical and psychological duress.

== Asylum and life in Australia ==
Al-Araibi took his opportunity to flee the country when out on bail and playing football for the national team in 2013 in Qatar. He fled first to Iran, then Malaysia, then Thailand and eventually, nearly six months later, to Australia where he sought asylum in May 2014. Since then, he has lived in Melbourne, marrying his wife (whom he had known since he was 17) and playing semi-professional football. He was granted refugee status in Australia in 2017, which allowed him to travel with documentation and the assurance of protection. He gained Australian citizenship in March 2019.

He has played as a defender in several semi-professional football teams in Victoria.

=== Speaking up about torture in Bahrain ===
Speaking to international media from Australia in 2016, al-Araibi said that Sheikh Salman Bin Ibrahim Al-Khalifa, a member of Bahrain's ruling royal family and then running for president of FIFA, should be investigated for possible involvement in the mass torture of pro-democracy athletes who had protested against the royal family during the 2011 uprising. Al-Araibi also accused Sheikh Salman of discriminating against Shia Muslims. Salman lost his bid for the FIFA presidency, but remains president of the Asian Football Confederation (AFC) and is still a FIFA vice-president.

=== After return from Thailand: Feb 2019 ===
On 27 February 2019 al-Araibi told of his ordeal in The Guardian, expressing his gratitude to all concerned for helping to secure his release and his relief at his return, but also of his belief that Bahrain will continue to pursue him. He also wrote of several cases of Bahrain's abuse of human rights, including the detention of activist Najah Yusuf and jiujitsu champion Mohamed Mirza, and his belief in the ability of sports bodies to apply effective pressure to bring about change.

In November 2019 he was appointed to the role of Community and Human Rights Advocate with Football Victoria. A role created in collaboration with Professional Footballers Australia, its aim is to inspire and support players from culturally and linguistically diverse communities, by telling his own story. Initially announced as a part-time position, it was confirmed as a permanent full-time position in December 2019. As of 2023 he is still in the role.

== Detention in Thailand ==
Al-Araibi and his wife flew to Thailand on 27 November 2018 for a belated honeymoon, but both were detained upon arrival at Bangkok's Suvarnabhumi Airport, at the request of Bahraini authorities, and in response to an Interpol red notice. The couple were moved to the Suan Plu immigration detention centre on 2 December. Al-Araibi's wife was later released and he was moved to Bangkok Remand Prison.

Questions about the role of the Australian Federal Police in his arrest were raised after it was reported that the AFP, working as locally based Interpol, had notified Thailand of his arrival and did not flag his refugee status. However, this was denied in a later press statement given by the Australian government, which said that by Bahrain had issued the Red Notice on 8 November 2018. The statement said that on 30 November Interpol rescinded the Red Notice, which had been issued erroneously and contrary to Interpol's rules regarding refugees and asylum-seekers, upon advice from Australia.

On 4 February 2019 al-Araibi arrived at the Bangkok court with his feet shackled together in front of many international supporters and news cameras, begging not to be sent back to Bahrain. However the Thai attorney-general's office ruled that Bahrain had a legitimate "criminal" case, and the court granted him 60 days, until 5 April, to submit his legal defence to stop his extradition to the country of his birth. He would have to remain in a Thai prison until his next court appearance on 22 April, after he was denied bail, when decisions would be made on permissible witnesses and the length of the extradition hearing. Al-Araibi's lawyer, Nadthasiri Bergman, said that it was "clearly a political case".

On 11 February, he was released after Thai prosecutors dropped the case on Bahrain's request, and arrived in Australia the following day. He was granted Australian citizenship one month later, on 12 March 2019.

=== Local and international campaigns and other responses ===
In response to al-Araibi's detention, Amnesty International, who have criticised the low level of human rights in Bahrain, pointed out that under international law, it is prohibited to return an individual to a territory when there is a reasonable fear that the individual will be at real risk of suffering torture or other serious human rights violations. Refoulement is considered a grave breach of a fundamental international human rights law.

His case was widely reported on major news outlets throughout the world, and was compared to that of Saudi Arabian woman Rahaf Mohammed, who was detained in Bangkok on 5 January 2019 at the request of Saudi authorities after fleeing the country, but released after criticism on social media and United Nations intervention, after being granted asylum in Canada.

Amnesty International Australia created a "Write for Rights" campaign for individuals to email Thai officials via their website, attracting 53,218 signatories as at 4 February 2019.

The Australian government, Football Federation Australia (FFA), Professional Footballers Australia (PFA), and FIFA all called for his release and return to Australia. FIFA called for al-Araibi's return to Australia in early December 2018 in communications with the FFA (although did not issue a media statement until January), and the FFA called for his return to Australia on 10 December.

Craig Foster, retired Australian captain, SBS Australia chief football analyst and PFA representative, campaigned on al-Araibi's behalf since news broke of his detention. He travelled to Switzerland to present a petition with more than 50,000 signatures demanding the release of the detained footballer and held talks with general secretary Fatma Samoura FIFA on 29 January 2019. He also spent time in Thailand speaking to al-Araibi's legal team and visited al-Araibi in prison. Foster's many tweets on the topic were widely shared and the hashtag #SaveHakeem has been trending on social media platforms. Foster was joined in Thailand by Francis Awaritefe, former Australian footballer, past Director of Football at Melbourne Victory and vice-president of FIFPro (International Federation of Professional Footballers), Awaritefe, who said on 4 February that the Australian government had done a good job so far, but more needed to be done. Foster said that football sanctions should be imposed on Thailand and Bahrain.

Australian football teams joined Pascoe Vale FC club in calling for his release, staging protests, wearing armbands and stopping for a minute's applause at A-League games around the country.

On 28 January 2019, Thai FA Cup champions football club Chiangrai United F.C. became the first Thai club to publicly support the detained footballer, club president Mitti Tiyapairat posting on the club's Facebook page and calling on its supporters to demand the Thai government meet its international obligations.

On 29 January 2019 the Asian Football Confederation (AFC) called for al-Araibi's release, after being criticised for its inaction, although Sheikh Salman made no public statement himself. The chair of Football Federation Australia has been seeking a place on the executive of the AFC.

On 4 February 2019, international football stars Didier Drogba and Jamie Vardy tweeted their support.

After the Bangkok court's judgement on 4 February, Australia's ambassador-designate in Thailand, Allan McKinnon, urged the Thai Prime Minister to allow al-Araibi to return to Australia, saying that he had the power to intervene and release him at any time and should do so. Also present outside the courtroom were ambassadors and representatives from the US and European Union countries and FIFA, as well as human rights groups and advocates for al-Araibi. Representatives of 14 countries attended the hearing.

The London-based Bahrain Institute for Rights and Democracy (BIRD) disagreed with Thailand's decision and his conviction in absentia to 10 years’ jail by Bahrain, saying that the documentation of al-Araibi's trial was full of "flaws and contradictions". On 6 February 2019, in the first instance of sporting sanctions, Australia's Under-23s Olyroos' pre-tournament camp to Thailand was cancelled by the FFA and alternatives were sought. Also on 6 February 2019, TwitterSports tweeted a snapshot of Trendsmap showing that there had been nearly 1 Million #SaveHakeem tweets from all over the world, showing a high concentration in Thailand.

On 7 February 2019, a coalition of 57 Thai human rights and civil liberties groups, academics and leading legal figures called on the Thai government to release al-Araibi, citing the political character of the charges and the "persecution, torture, cruel treatment or a life-threatening situation" to which al-Araibi may be subject if he is extradited.

=== Australian government responses ===
In early December 2018, Foreign Minister Marise Payne said that she had raised the matter with her Thai counterpart, Don Pramudwinai, requesting that Al-Araibi be allowed to return to Melbourne as soon as possible. His status as a permanent resident allows him to remain in Australia indefinitely and to travel abroad, so long as he does not travel to Bahrain.

On 30 January 2019, it was reported that Australian Prime Minister Scott Morrison had called upon his Thai counterpart Prayut Chan-o-cha a few days earlier in a letter, stressing that al-Araibi had been issued a permanent protection visa by Australia after a deliberate and considered process and that returning the footballer to Bahrain would infringe his rights under international human rights law.

In late January, the office of Marise Payne said that her government was making "extensive efforts" on behalf of al-Araibi.

On 5 February 2019, the Australian government urged Thailand to exercise its legal discretion to free the footballer, saying "Thailand's office of the Attorney-General has publicly confirmed that Thailand's Extradition Act allows for executive discretion in such cases. This was also confirmed by the prosecutor in the context of yesterday's hearing.".

On 7 February 2019, in response to the Thai Ministry of Foreign Affairs' press release on 6 February and Deputy Permanent Secretary Thani Thongpakdi's statements earlier in the day on 7 February, the Australian government issued a statement saying that "Australia never issued a Red Notice against Mr Alaraibi. This Red Notice was issued by Bahrain on 8 November 2018." It went on to say that the Red Notice should never have been issued because of his status as a protected refugee; this was a breach of Interpol's regulations. The Australian government not initially being aware of this, in line with procedure notified Thailand of his travel. When they had become aware of the situation, they ensured the Red Notice was rescinded as soon as possible, on 30 November. Australian government representatives had said unequivocally on many occasions that al-Araibi should be returned to Australia as soon as possible."

=== Thai government responses ===
On 5 February 2019, Thai prime minister Prayuth Chan-ocha broke his silence on the issue, telling reporters not to "jump to conclusions" regarding the verdict and not to politicise the issue, commenting that the Foreign Ministry was working with both Australia and Bahrain to find a solution. Foreign minister Don Pramudwinai said Australia and Bahrain should negotiate a solution, with Thailand ready to mediate, and that "for now Hakeem will be under the care of Thai authorities". Australian PM Scott Morrison said that he had received a reply to his letter to Mr Chan-ocha, but had written to him again after being disturbed at the appearance of al-Araibi in shackles at the hearing the day before. The head of Thailand's prisons defended the decision to use leg restraints, after photos and video of al-Araibi in chains and prison garb dominated local media discussion panels.

On 6 February, the Thai Ministry of Foreign Affairs issued an eight-point press release, stressing Thailand's role as a disinterested party which had unwittingly become tangled in a dispute between Australia and Bahrain, but which as a sovereign country has "legal obligations and commitments to the international community". It expressed the hope that "Australia and Bahrain will have the goodwill to earnestly work together towards finding a win-win solution to this issue".

On 7 February, MFA deputy permanent secretary Thani Thongpakdi said the Australian branch of Interpol had emailed the Thailand and Bahraini branches in the morning of 27 November to alert them to the fact that Araibi was travelling to Bangkok was subject to a Red Notice. Later that day the Thais had received a note from the Bahraini embassy informing them similarly that al-Araibi would soon be arriving in Thailand and that he had a Red Notice, and seeking their cooperation. Thongpakdi said that the Red Notice had been issued by Bahrain in August 2018. He also said that it was possible for the Thai Prime Minister to intervene in the case, but only after the extradition request has gone through court and all appeals had been exhausted.

=== Bahraini government responses ===
Bahrain has said little publicly about the case, but interior minister Sheikh Rashid bin Abdullah Al Khalifa issued a statement condemning external interference in the internal affairs of Bahrain, saying that critics of Bahraini courts should remember that al-Araibi was released on bail and allowed to travel to Qatar to play for the national team.

=== Relationship between Thailand and Bahrain ===
Thailand is not a signatory to the 1951 Refugee Convention, has a history of returning alleged criminals to their countries of origin, and has strong economic links with Bahrain.

Academics and human rights groups raised the issue of the very close ties between the two countries, both financially and between the two royal families. Political leaders from each country, as part of a joint commission aimed at strengthening cooperation between their nations, last met in August 2018.

According to Dr Aim Sinpeng, an expert in South-East Asian politics at the University of Sydney, the Thai and Bahraini royal families have always had a close relationship and the Bahraini royal family visits Thailand every year. He believes Thailand was stuck in a "no win" situation over Al-Arabi's detention, adding that Australia and Thailand also share close ties. Thai Deputy Prime Minister and Minister of Foreign Affairs Surapong Tovichakchaikul had said in 2012 that the relationship between Thailand and Bahrain "was very close and strong" and also disclosed Bahrain Prime Minister was a "close personal friend" of former Thai prime minister Thaksin Shinawatra and had "donated roughly $2 million of his own money" to Thailand for flood relief.

The latest new business venture between the two countries is a new 6,700-square-metre (72,000 sq ft) Thai shopping centre in Manama, set to launch in the first half of 2019 and described as an opportunity for Thai small and medium-sized enterprises to reach a huge potential market of Saudi shoppers, said to be the biggest economic centre in Bahrain, with import and exports between the two countries expected to be worth around US$400m annually.

=== Freedom and aftermath ===
On 11 February 2019, it was announced by the Thai Office of the Attorney-General (OAG) that the extradition case against Al-Araibi had been dropped by the criminal court at Bahrain's request. No reason was given by the foreign ministry, but the decision was made under Section 21 of the Prosecution Act, which allows for cases to be dropped if not in the public interest, and he would be released and allowed to return to Australia as soon as possible. He was subsequently placed on a flight to Melbourne, landing there on 12 February and being welcomed by a huge crowd.

On 18 February, the AFP and Home Affairs Assistant Minister Linda Reynolds were questioned in a Senate estimates hearing about the circumstances leading to al-Arabi's detention. Reynolds said that the outdated system for Interpol notices caused the delay in Home Affairs notifying the AFP of Al-Araibi's refugee status. AFP Commissioner Andrew Colvin defended his staff, saying that the Australian Interpol NCB (National Central Bureau) adhered to the policies and procedures of Interpol, but that reviews were being undertaken to improve inter-agency co-ordination and reduce similar incidents in the future. He said that the NCB acted within 24 hours to rescind Interpol's red notice once it became aware of Mr Al-Araibi's status, and the Red Notice against Al-Araibi would never have been issued in the first place if they had known he was a refugee.

== In film ==
The 2023 documentary film The Defenders, directed by Adelaide filmmaker Matthew Bate, tells the story of how Foster and others worked to free al-Araibi from prison. It won the audience award for best Australian Documentary at the Sydney Film Festival on 15 June 2023, and was released on Amazon Prime Video on 23 June 2023, after a special preview screening by Adelaide Film Festival in Adelaide on 21 June. The film's working title was Fighting for Hakeem, the title of Foster's 2019 book. The film score was composed by Adelaide composer Benjamin Speed.

Al-Araibi is still fearful for his life and family, and hopes that the film will help to protect him from the Bahraini Government.
