= Lucy Zelić =

Australian television presenter (born 1986)

- Born: 9 November 1986 (age 40); Canberra, Australian Capital Territory, Australia
- Occupation: Television presenter
- Employer(s): Sky News Australia, Daily Telegraph,
- Television: The World Game
- Partner: Corey Gameiro
- Children: 1

Lucy Zelić (born 9 November 1986) is an Australian television presenter and political commentator living in Sydney.

== Career ==
Zelić was the host of Canberra radio station 2XX FM's football show "The Far Post". She later became a commentator for Canberra United F.C. W-League matches for the radio station, and was a guest-host on the Balls n' All football show on 106.3FM. Zelić hosted Football Federation Australia's official A-League podcast for the 2012–13 A-League season and is a former host of the nationally streamed football podcast Nearpost.

Zelić joined SBS in 2013, where she began as a sideline reporter for SBS's Friday night coverage of the A-League and sports television segment presenter for SBS World News Australia. In 2014, she also shared hosting responsibilities with David Zdrilic and hosted SBS's coverage of the 2014 FIFA World Cup.

She then started hosting the weekly football program The World Game.

Zelić hosted SBS's coverage of the 2018 World Cup along with Craig Foster.

In June 2021, it was announced that Zelić would leave SBS after an almost eight-year broadcasting career.

Zelić now works as a right-wing political commentator on Sky News Australia and Daily Telegraph, promoting conservative views. In 2025, Zelić described herself as a member of the "Liberal Party faithful" for "many years".

== Personal life ==
Zelić was born to Croatian parents. She is the younger sister of former football players Ivan Zelic and Ned Zelic. She supports Premier League club Liverpool and Bundesliga club Borussia Dortmund. Zelić was a Miss Universe Australia finalist in 2007, and holds a bachelor's degree in Journalism and Sports Business from the University of Canberra. She has also been nominated in Cosmopolitan Australia's 2014 Fun, Fearless, Female television personality category, and was a Peter Leonard Scholarship nominee in 2010.

On 7 November 2018, Zelić announced that she was expecting her first child with partner Corey Gameiro, seven years her junior. A girl was born 23 April 2019.
