= On the Ball (Australian talk show) =

On The Ball was an Australian Special Broadcasting Service (SBS) television talk show about soccer, which began around 1984 and ended in 2002.

The show was mainly hosted by Les Murray and Johnny Warren, but were often joined by other hosts & analysts, including Stephanie Brantz, Francis Awaritefe, Paul Williams and Damien Lovelock. It was well known for promoting the game of football in Australia and endorsing candidates for the Socceroos coaching job and for the board of Soccer Australia (since replaced by Football Australia).

The show was replaced with The World Game.

== See also ==
- List of Australian television series
- List of programs broadcast by Special Broadcasting Service
