= Indigenous Australian sport =

Indigenous Australian sport was discouraged by the British colonisers, and Aboriginal Australians and Torres Strait Islander people have faced discrimination when participating in mainstream Australian sports. Sports such as cricket, rugby, netball, soccer and field hockey were introduced into Indigenous communities so they could socialise with and assimilate into white Australian culture.

== Participation with European Australians ==
The British discouraged Indigenous Australians from continuing their existing sporting traditions. Aboriginal people faced discrimination when participating in mainstream white Australian sports. Cricket, rugby, netball, soccer and field hockey were introduced into Aboriginal communities as a way of encouraging socialisation with and assimilating Aboriginal people into greater Australian culture. Cricket was specifically used to teach "white values".

While sport has provided some opportunities for Aboriginal people, it has not provided a framework for enabling community-wide benefits as it relates to wider Australian culture. Male Indigenous Australians have largely been under-represented at the highest level of Australian sport, with a few exceptions, notably Australian rules football, boxing and in the rugby league.

== History ==
The Aboriginal Sports Foundation was created in 1969, and The National Aboriginal Sports Awards were first given in 1986. At the 1986 National Aborigines' Day, more than 70 members of the Australian Indigenous community had their sporting achievements recognised.

The International Aboriginal Cup, a women's competition between Aboriginal Australians and First Nations Canadians, took place for the first time in 1990.

At the 1994 Commonwealth Games, Cathy Freeman carried an Australian and Aboriginal flag, following her victory.

== Sport in the community ==
There is pressure on Indigenous Australians in sport to act as role models for the wider community.

In 2001, sport facility access was available to 85% of Indigenous Australians living in Indigenous communities of 50 or more people. Aboriginal Australians sought out sports like athletics and swimming in part because they had aspects of traditional sports from their community. Traditional sports included boomerang throwing and running.

Most Indigenous sports at the time of European arrival were for enjoyment. These sports were not absorbed into European sports, and sporting traditions began to fade during the same time when other Indigenous traditions were fading.

The Australian Sports Commission has taken steps to try to preserve knowledge about Indigenous sporting traditions. In 1868, an all-Australian Aboriginal team toured England.

== See also ==
- First Nations Olympians in Australia
- Indigenous Australians#Recreation and sport
