= First Nations Olympians in Australia =

Indigenous Australians, including both Aboriginal Australians and Torres Strait Islanders, have represented Australia at the Olympic Games. As of the 2024 Summer Olympics, 60 Indigenous Australians have competed at the Olympics. Of those athletes, 59 competed at the Summer Olympic Games, while one competed at the Winter Olympic Games.

The first Indigenous Australians to compete at the Olympics were basketball player Michael Ah Matt and boxers Adrian Blair and Francis Roberts, all three of whom participated in the 1964 Summer Olympics in Tokyo.

The Australian Olympic Indigenous Coaching Scholarship support the First Nations Olympic sports leaders' professional development, education and training.
