= Johnny Warren =

Australian soccer player, coach, administrator, writer and broadcaster (1943–2004)

Johnny Warren MBE OAM
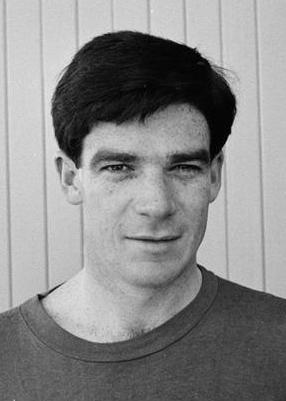
- Warren in 1968

Personal information
- Full name: John Norman Warren
- Date of birth: 17 May 1943
- Place of birth: Sydney, Australia
- Date of death: 6 November 2004 (aged 61)
- Place of death: Sydney, Australia
- Position: Inside right

Youth career
- Botany Methodists
- Earlwood Wanderers

Senior career*
Years	Team	Apps	(Gls)
1959–1962	Canterbury-Marrickville		
1963–1964	St George Budapest		
1964	Stockport County	0	(0)
1965–1974	St George Budapest		

International career^{‡}
1965–1974	Australia	42	(7)

Managerial career
- 1974: St George Budapest
- 1977–1978: Canberra City
- * Club domestic league appearances and goals as of 7 October 2009 ‡ National team caps and goals as of 7 October 2009

John Norman Warren (17 May 1943 – 6 November 2004) was an Australian soccer player, coach, administrator, writer and broadcaster. He was known as Captain Socceroo for his passionate work to promote the game in Australia. The award for the best player in the A-League is named the Johnny Warren Medal in his honour.

== Early life ==
Warren grew up in the suburb of Botany in Sydney and had two elder brothers, Geoff and Ross.

He attended Cleveland St. High School, Surry Hills, later becoming the school vice-captain.

== Playing career ==
=== Club career ===
After playing junior football for Botany Methodists and Earlwood Wanderers Warren joined Canterbury-Marrickville as a fifteen-year-old in 1959. Initially he played in the club's third grade team before being promoted to the first grade later in the year.

In 1963 Warren transferred to St George Budapest. In a 12-year stint at St George Warren won three NSW State League grand finals, one premiership and two state cups. His final action as a player was to score a match-winning goal for St George in the 1974 NSW State League Grand Final. Immediately after scoring the goal he substituted himself off.

=== International career ===
Warren made his full international debut for Australia in November 1965 against Cambodia in Phnom Penh. He played 42 international matches, including Australia's first World Cup appearance in 1974.

In 1967 Warren captained the national team for the first time in a match against New Zealand in Saigon. He went on to captain Australia in 24 internationals.

=== International goals ===
#	Date	Venue	Opponent	Score	Result	Competition
1.	5 November 1967	Cong Hoa Stadium, Saigon, South Vietnam	New Zealand	5–3	Win	Quoc Khanh Cup
2.	7 November 1967	Cong Hoa Stadium, Saigon, South Vietnam	South Vietnam	0–1	Win	Quoc Khanh Cup
3.	11 November 1967	Cong Hoa Stadium, Saigon, South Vietnam	Singapore	5–1	Win	Quoc Khanh Cup
4.	14 November 1967	Cong Hoa Stadium, Saigon, South Vietnam	South Korea	2–3	Win	Quoc Khanh Cup
5.	29 November 1969	Estádio Salazar, Maputo, Mozambique	Rhodesia	1–3	Win	1970 World Cup qual.
6.	9 October 1972	Senayan Stadium, Jakarta, Indonesia	New Zealand	3–1	Win	Friendly
7.	29 October 1972	Manila, Philippines	Philippines	0–6	Win	Friendly
Correct as of 21 January 2016

== Coaching career ==
In 1974 Warren was a player-coach with St George Budapest.

As well as helping found Canberra City, he served as the team's first coach in 1977 and 1978.

== After retirement ==
=== Media ===
Warren worked in television commentating football for the Australian Broadcasting Corporation (ABC) and Special Broadcasting Service (SBS) television networks. It was at SBS where he made his mark, appearing on a number of football analysis shows including On the Ball and The World Game.

Warren wept openly on national television in 1997 when two very late goals by Iran resulted in a 2–2 draw against the Socceroos in the final World Cup qualifying match and sent Iran to the 1998 FIFA World Cup.

=== Gold Creek ===
While in Canberra, John and his business partners acquired control of the Gold Creek Function and Entertainment Centre based around the historic Gold Creek Homestead (located in present-day Ngunnawal). The function centre was one of the National Capital's premier function venues.

During the 1980s and early 1990s, numerous international visitors including members of Brazil's Under 19s football team travelled to Gold Creek to get their first taste of Australian country life. Annual football camps were also held there under the auspices of the Australian Soccer Federation. Over a period of ten years, upwards of 10,000 teenagers from around the nation completed the two-week training camps.

=== Opposition to the OFC ===
Warren frequently argued for abolition of the Oceania Football Confederation (OFC), claiming that the OFC offered nothing to either the world game nor to the nations that comprised the confederation. The lack of competition for Australia in the OFC was exemplified by the 2002 FIFA World Cup qualification results that featured 11–0, 22–0 and 31–0 scorelines against OFC opponents. At the time, the OFC did not have a direct qualification route to the World Cup. From 1986 to 2022, the OFC champion could only feature in an intercontinental play-off series against a team from either CONMEBOL, CONCACAF or the Asian Football Confederation (AFC) to achieve a World Cup berth. Warren favoured a merger between the OFC and AFC that would allow the OFC nations to play in a regular qualification series. After the Crawford Report of which he was a committee member, Australia joined the AFC in 2006.

=== Struggle for national success ===
Warren's publicly held belief was that if Australia's strong sporting tradition was focused on the sport then Australia could be a world power in the game. One of his famous quotes on the matter was "I'm sick of us saying, 'When are we going to qualify for the World Cup'? When are we going to win the World Cup? ... Call me a dreamer." His comments came shortly after Australia had defeated England 3–1 in a friendly featuring a full-strength English side in February 2003 and two Confederations Cup wins over France and Brazil (the two finalist teams of the 1998 FIFA World Cup) when Australia took third place at the 2001 FIFA Confederations Cup in a 1–0 play-off win over Brazil.

Warren claimed that these results showed that Australia was a much more powerful football nation than many gave it credit for. At the time, Australia was reigning world champion in the other international codes – rugby union, rugby league and cricket, in addition to being an Olympic power and won four Formula One world titles between the 1950s and 1980s (with Jack Brabham and Alan Jones).

Nevertheless, Warren predicted that the Australian national team would attain consistent international success. He famously expressed a desire to say 'I told you so' to the team's detractors. The phrase has since become commonplace in the Australian soccer community, reflective of Warren's overarching desire to see soccer become the most popular sport in Australia.

=== Sheilas, Wogs and Poofters ===
In 2002, Warren published a best selling book, Sheilas, Wogs and Poofters, An Incomplete Biography of Johnny Warren & Soccer in Australia which traced the growth of soccer in Australia, especially in the post-World War II years. The title refers to alleged sexist, racist and homophobic attitudes towards soccer exhibited frequently by many Australians and especially the major city media in Australia through this period. The term "sheila" refers to a woman, "wog" is a derogatory term (but has since been appropriated by some) to refer to Australians of Mediterranean origin (specifically Southern Europe and the Levant), while "poofter" is a slur for a homosexual (generally a gay man).

== Personal life, illness and death ==
In 1967 Warren married Marion Wilson. They divorced in 1969. He later married Maryana, originally from Uruguay. In 1997, his first wife Marion became a missing person. The case is the subject of the podcast The Lady Vanishes.

After smoking heavily for most of his life since his adolescence, in 2003 Warren publicly announced that he had been diagnosed with lung cancer. Several months later FIFA (International Federation of Association Football) president Sepp Blatter presented a frail Warren with the FIFA Centennial Order of Merit for his services to the game in Australia.

His last public appearance was made during the launch of the rebranded Australian domestic football league, the A-League, which replaced the previous National Soccer League.

Weeks before death, Warren was asked what he wanted his sporting legacy to be – his answer "I Told You So", a phrase which has become a catch-cry in Australian football and during the 2006 FIFA World Cup appeared on the scoreboard in the backdrop of the SBS World Cup studio.

Warren died of respiratory complications related to his cancer on 6 November 2004, at the Royal Prince Alfred Hospital in Sydney. He was awarded a full state funeral, the first to be held for a sportsman. Just over a year after his death, Australia qualified for the FIFA World Cup for the first time in 32 years, after defeating Uruguay in a penalty shootout. SBS analyst and former Socceroo Craig Foster was heard to shout "Johnny Warren!" on air in the immediate aftermath of Australia's victory, and shortly before the end of the SBS broadcast, the journalist and his longtime colleague and friend Les Murray said "They've done it, Johnny!".

He is survived by his only child Shannon Lee Warren (daughter of Donna Gilberston) and his four grandchildren Riley, Natasha, Tayla and Rhianna.

== Legacy ==
The documentary Johnny Warren’s Football Mission, released in 2006, features interviews with his former teammates, family, friends and football journalists. In the documentary, Warren's long-time colleague at SBS, Les Murray, wished that Johnny's prophecy for Australian football would ring true. In the documentary, Murray professed that "Johnny's mission hasn't been accomplished. It's still going. I don't believe it will be achieved until Australia wins the World Cup one day, and everyone appreciates football in the same way Johnny did." In one of his final public appearances, Warren was instilled into the FIFA Centennial Order of Merit in 2004, an accolate that Murray believed was "the first time he [Warren] felt rewarded - truly rewarded - by football. He had always been acknowledged [...] letters from the queen, from heads of state, but never from football". At the ceremony, Warren used the opportunity to declare his love for Australian football and its future: "I want Australia to embrace this fabulous game. It's not wog-ball, this is the game of the world [...] we've got to stop talking about when we're going to qualify, we need to start talking about when we're going to win World Cups. If Japan, Korea and Turkey can do what they did, if Greece can do what they did at the Euro championships, then there's a message there for Australia, that champion teams beat teams of champions". Warren publicly advocated for the National Soccer League (NSL) to be disbanded, recommending so in the 2003 Crawford Report. The NSL's eventual demise laid bare the foundations for the new A-Leagues competitions, which feature no ethnic affiliations in any team to appeal to the mainstream Australian sporting landscape.

Johnny Warren's untimely death in 2004 meant that he never witnessed the Socceroos qualify for a FIFA World Cup after doing so in 1973. When Australia ended a 31 year wait to qualify for a FIFA World Cup, defeating Uruguay on penalties, Les Murray paid homage to Warren's legacy on the SBS broadcast. At the commencement of the post-match analysis, Murray joyously opened the segment, claiming that the match was "one of the most epic games that I've had the opportunity to witness, and I've seen a few as you may be able to guess, and of course one in which we were all emotionally involved. And for Johnny Warren, I told you so, I told you so, and there it is, he has been proven to be right once again." Looking up to the sky, Murray profoundly said "Johnny, we hear you". In later World Cup qualification cycles, Australian supporters have frequently displayed tifos that display Warren's iconic 'I told you so' message. In the second leg of Australia's intercontinental play-off match against Honduras, the Green and Gold Army created a tifo honouring both Warren and Les Murray. When Australia qualified for the 2022 FIFA World Cup against Peru, supporters were seen in the stadium bearing 'I told you so' banners in Warren's honour. At the Matildas' games during the 2023 FIFA Women's World Cup held in Australia and New Zealand, members of the Matildas Active Support group unfurled banners displaying 'I told you so', as well as 'never say die'. In 2005, Johnny Warren's family donated a collection of 503 items of memorabilia to the National Museum of Australia. The collection includes football uniforms, medals, scrapbooks and trophies. The National Museum paid tribute to Warren in 2010 with 'I told you so': Johnny Warren and football in Australia, a display to coincide with the World Cup.

The Jamberoo Pub, located on the NSW South Coast, is owned and run by members of the Warren family. The hotel bistro is well known for being a shrine dedicated to Johnny Warren, containing medals, photos, awards and other memorabilia about his life.

In 2022, the Sydney Football Stadium opened after a four-year construction period. In an initiative to commemorate significant sporting figures in New South Wales, Johnny Warren was posthumously honoured with bay 23 of the stadium being named in his honour. Warren was included in the venue's 'Ring of Champions' along with Arthur Beetson, Ron Coote, Betty Cuthbert and Nicholas Shehadie. Warren was also recognised by the Sydney Cricket & Sports Ground Trust with a permanent statue outside the stadium in honour of his captaincy of the 1974 Socceroos and his advocacy for the development of association football in Australia.

== Honours ==
=== Individual ===
- Member of the Order of the British Empire (MBE): 1974
- Sport Australia Hall of Fame Inductee: 1988
- FFA Hall of Champions Inductee: 1999
- Australian Sports Medal: 2000
- Centenary Medal: 2001
- ACT Sport Hall of Fame Inductee: 2002
- Medal of the Order of Australia (OAM): 2002
- FIFA Centennial Order of Merit: 2004
- Australian Sports Commission Media Awards- Lifetime Achievement Award: 2004
- John Warren Street in the Sydney suburb of Glenwood is named for him.
- First Australian Footballer with a statue in Sydney Cricket Ground posthumously: 27 March 2016

=== Club ===
Canterbury-Marrickville

- New South Wales Grand Final Runner Up: 1960

St George Budapest

- New South Wales Champions: 1972

== See also ==
- Johnny Warren Medal
