= Craig Foster =

Australian human rights advocate, former soccer player and commentator (born 1969)

Craig Foster AM
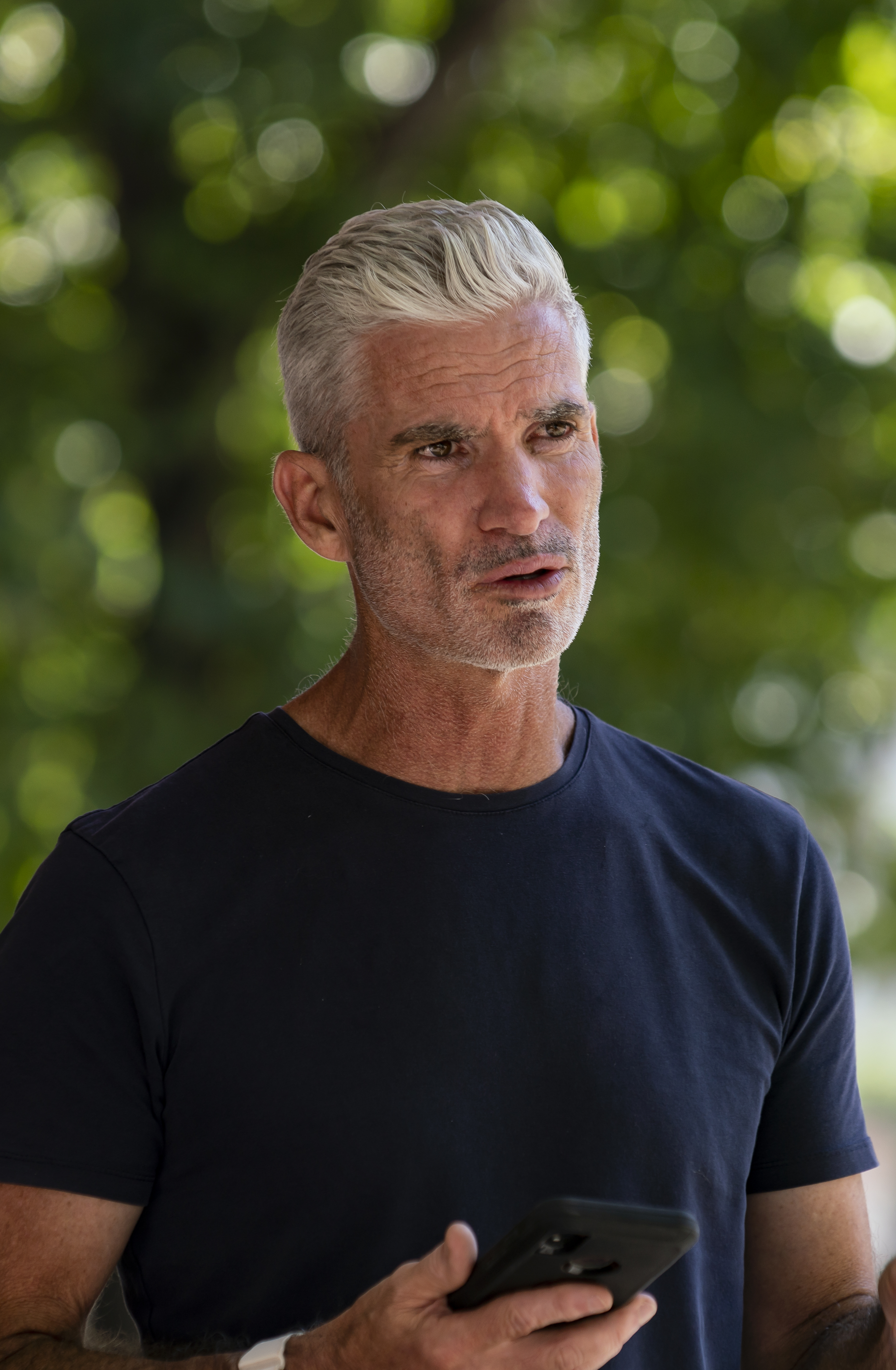
- Foster in 2022
- Born: Craig Andrew Foster; 1969 (age 56–57); Lismore, New South Wales, Australia
- Education: Kadina High School; Johan Cruyff Institute; Central Queensland University
- Occupations: Former soccer player, human rights advocate, sports presenter
- Known for: Australian national soccer team player and captain, human rights advocacy
- Notable work: Fighting for Hakeem (2019)
- Television: SBS (2002 – June 2020); Stan (August 2020 – present)
- Board member of: Australian Republic Movement (Chair), Australian Multicultural Council, John Moriarty Football
- Awards: Logie Awards (3); Member of the Order of Australia
- Website: craigfoster.net

Craig Foster
Personal information
- Full name: Craig Andrew Foster
- Height: 1.80 m (5 ft 11 in)
- Position: Midfielder

Youth career
- 1986–1987: AIS

Senior career*
Years	Team	Apps	(Gls)
1988–1989	Sydney United	39	(2)
1989–1990	Sunshine Georgies	33	(0)
1991	Avala		
1991	Singapore		
1992	Avala	6	(0)
1992–1993	Ernest Borel		
1994–1996	Adelaide City	50	(16)
1996–1997	Marconi Stallions	26	(4)
1997–1998	Portsmouth	19	(4)
1998–2000	Crystal Palace	52	(3)
2000–2003	Northern Spirit	43	(2)

International career
1985	Australia U-17		
1996–2000	Australia	29	(9)
Medal record
Representing Australia
Men's Association football
FIFA Confederations Cup
Runner-up	1997 Saudi Arabia
OFC Nations Cup
Winner	1996 Oceania
Winner	2000 Tahiti
- * Club domestic league appearances and goals

Craig Andrew Foster AM (born 1969), nicknamed Fozzy or Fozz, is an Australian retired soccer player, human rights activist and sports analyst for the Stan streaming service in Australia. Foster played soccer professionally from 1988 to 2003, including for the national team, the Socceroos, from 1996 to 2000, and was chief soccer analyst for SBS from around 2002 until June 2020. He was the 419th Socceroo, and the 40th captain of the national team.

Foster is also known for his human rights advocacies, and is a vocal critic of the Australian Government's treatment of asylum seekers. He played a high-profile role in the campaign to free Bahraini footballer Hakeem al-Araibi from detention in Thailand in from late 2018 to early 2019, later co-writing a book about it, Fighting for Hakeem, which became the working title of a 2023 documentary film (renamed The Defenders).

Foster was elected chair of the Australian Republic Movement in November 2022.

== Early life and education ==
Craig Andrew Foster was born in 1969 in Lismore, New South Wales. Both sides of his family are of Anglo-Celtic descent.

He attended Kadina High School, periodically returning to speak and motivate students. Foster holds a Postgraduate Diploma in Football Business and a Master in Sport Management degree from the Johan Cruyff Institute. In 2019, he earned a Bachelor of Laws degree from the Central Queensland University Australia.

== Playing career ==
=== Club career ===
Playing as a midfielder, Foster debuted with Sydney Croatia in 1988, playing in a losing grand final in his first season. He has said his time at Sydney Croatia is what began his interest in multiculturalism.

He moved to Victorian club Sunshine George Cross in 1989 before returning to Sydney to play for Avala in the NSW Super League in 1992. In 1992–93, Foster played for Ernest Borel in Hong Kong, before returning to Australia to play for Adelaide City in 1994 and then Marconi in the NSL in 1996/7.

As a 28-year-old he moved to England, linking up with Terry Venables firstly at Portsmouth in 1997–98, before moving to Crystal Palace as a free agent from 1998 to 2000.

He returned to Australia to play with Northern Spirit, based in North Sydney, until his retirement from the game in 2003.

In 2013 he was listed as a player for the Belmore United Over 35s along with Paul Okon and Francis Awaritefe.

=== International career ===
Foster represented Australia at under-16 level, reaching the quarter finals at the 1985 FIFA U-16 World Championship in China.

He was the 419th player for the Australia national team (the Socceroos) from 1996 to 2000, earning 29 caps, and was the team's 40th captain, and scoring nine goals.

As a Socceroo, he played in the following competitions and games:

- FIFA Confederations Cup: runner-up, 1997
- OFC Nations Cup: 1996, 2000
- As captain, friendly match, 1–1 draw with Bulgaria, 15 February 2000)
- Australia – Team of the Century: nominee

=== In retirement ===
As of 2022, Foster still plays for Waverley Old Boys Over 35s.

== Other roles related to soccer ==
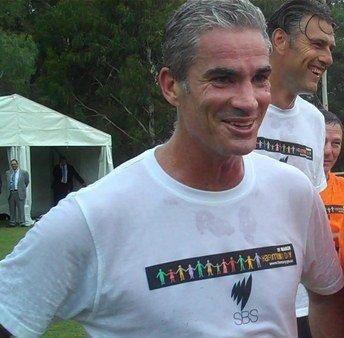
Foster in 2011

Foster started his on-air career with the Seven Network, serving as a soccer analyst and principal commentator on their then pay TV sport channel, C7 Sport, as well as regularly appearing as a panellist on SBS' weekly soccer program On The Ball. He later joined SBS full-time, working with Les Murray and the Johnny Warren at the helm of SBS' hugely successful soccer broadcasts. He became known as "Fozz" or "Fozzy".

Following his retirement from professional soccer, Foster became the chief soccer analyst for the SBS show The World Game, from around 2002 until June 2020. He is remembered for his commentary during the World Cup Qualifier in November 2005 against Uruguay, and during the 2006 FIFA World Cup, Foster was part of the SBS commentary team from Germany.

He advocated for a more Spanish/South American style of play, as opposed to the constant use of the long ball in soccer, and was also known for his outspoken stance on the need for soccer in Australia to mature.

In 2007, Foster was invited to be the Australian representative to judge the Ballon d'Or, the highest award given to an individual soccer player.

Also in 2007, he was a coach for the team assembled by the SBS television show Nerds FC in their second season.

In June 2020, it was announced that Foster would be leaving SBS, after working for 18 years as a sports presenter. He joined Stan Sport in August 2020, in time to co-present, along with UK presenter Max Rushden, several big UEFA competitions: the Champions League the Europa League, and the Conference League.

Foster has been a strong advocate for players' rights, having served for five years on Professional Footballers Australia (PFA) Executive, as a Director of the PFA's commercial wing, PFAM (PFA Management), and formerly as Interim Chief Executive of the Australian Soccer Players' Association (PFA's former name). He is a life member of the PFA, and in 2016 was appointed interim chairman of the PFA.

Other roles include being an Ambassador for the Johan Cruyff Institute (since 2018, as of 2022) and a co-director/ board member of John Moriarty Football.

== Human rights and social advocacy ==
Foster is a member of the Australian Multicultural Council, since 2018 and as of March 2022. He has long been an advocate for footballers and has been human rights and refugee ambassador for Amnesty International. He has often used his position as presenter and chief football analyst at SBS to criticise unethical practices in the game. He works in a range of social programs, including Indigenous rights and self-determination; homelessness in Australia; climate change; and advocacy for refugees.

In August 2025, Foster attended the March for Humanity in Sydney, a large protest highlighting the plight of Palestinians in the Gaza conflict.

=== Hakeem al-Araibi campaign ===
Foster was vocal in campaigning on behalf of Bahraini footballer Hakeem al-Araibi, who was granted protection as a political refugee in Australia in 2014 but was detained upon arrival in Thailand in November 2018 while on his honeymoon with his wife owing to an Interpol red notice put out by Bahrain. Foster travelled to Switzerland to present a petition with more than 50,000 signatures demanding the release of the detained footballer and held talks with general secretary Fatma Samoura FIFA on 29 January 2019, spent time in Thailand speaking to al-Araibi's legal team and visited al-Araibi in prison. Foster's many tweets on the topic were widely shared. After al-Araibi's release was secured, others tweeted nominations for Foster as Australian of the Year or even prime minister. Many politicians, including prime minister Scott Morrison praised him for his efforts.

Foster said after the release of al-Araibi that the fight had just begun, and after the incident had shone light on the atrocities against athletes during and after the Bahraini uprising of 2011, what was needed is a full investigation into the matter by both FIFA and the IOC to ensure that justice is done for all athletes. He also implicitly offered criticism of Australia's current policies on refugees, saying "Australia needs to look at how we treat every human being that comes to these shores, irrespective of how they arrive... We are all equal, and should all be treated with equal dignity, care and respect", and "Australia must do better than we have in recent years".

Foster plays a prominent role in the 2023 documentary film The Defenders by Adelaide filmmaker Matthew Bate, which tells the story the campaign to free al-Araibi from prison. It was released on Amazon Prime Video on 23 June 2023, after being shown at the Sydney Film Festival (where it won an audience award) and a special preview screening by Adelaide Film Festival in Adelaide on 21 June. Foster is also credited as co-writer on the film, as some of the script was based on his book, Fighting for Hakeem, which was the working title of the film.

=== Refugee advocacy ===
On 22 February 2019, Foster published an open letter to the Australian prime minister Scott Morrison and leader of the opposition, Bill Shorten, in The Sydney Morning Herald, in which, after thanking them for their assistance in helping to free al-Araibi, he addressed the issue of how Australia treats its asylum seekers. He said "I have waited until after Hakeem was safely home [from Thailand] to explain that one of the reasons it was so difficult to garner international support was because of our own treatment of refugees. This was a constant theme throughout discussions with international stakeholders" and "The policy of indefinite, offshore detention does not uphold our international obligations...". He said that he was urging others to uphold their human rights obligations in allowing al-Araibi to return to Australia, while "we are failing to uphold our own". He became the face of Amnesty Australia's "Game Over" (#GameOver) campaign in late 2019, which has been supported by high-profile sportspeople such as Liz Ellis, Benny Elias, Paul Roos, Ian Chappell, Lisa Sthalekar, Paul Wade, Frank Farina, Alex Tobin, Craig Moore; musician Jimmy Barnes, actors Bryan Brown and Anthony La Paglia musicians and many others. Sally McManus, and many others. The campaign centres on the plight of asylum seekers kept in indefinite detention by the Australian Government, for many years after 2013 at detention centres on Manus Island, (PNG), and Nauru. In October 2020, as part of the campaign, Foster and NRL star Sonny Bill Williams presented a petition containing more than 65,000 signatures to federal parliament, which called upon the government to take up New Zealand's longstanding (since 2013) offer to resettle refugees who had been held Australian offshore detention for many years.

On 23 March 2022 Foster delivered the Australian National University's annual "Australia and the World Lecture", which had been postponed from 2021 owing to the COVID-19 pandemic in Australia, at the National Press Club of Australia. It was titled "Human Rights, Democracy and Global Citizenry – Recovering Australia's Humanity and Place in the World: 2021 ANU Australia and the World Lecture". The address looked at Australia's role in the world from the lived experience of asylum seekers and refugees, and argued that the nation should live up to its commitments as a responsible global citizen. In the talk, he said that Australia had not performed well Indigenous and refugee rights or on climate change. He bemoaned the lack of good leadership on these issues, and said that the colonisation of Australia had been underpinned by racism, and is still present in policy and media coverage; that it is a "festering sore on the national psyche". The following day, Home Affairs Minister Karen Andrews announced that the government would accept New Zealand's to resettle some of the refugees.

=== Saudi Arabia and Qatar ===
Foster was a vocal critic of the 2022 FIFA World Cup in Qatar, particularly on the issue of wage theft and labour abuses on the migrant workers that built the World Cup infrastructure. He has vocally supported the #PayUpFIFA campaign of the Human Rights Watch, which advocates for the payment of US$440 million for the affected families of the mistreated migrant workers. He has also criticised Saudi Arabia's sponsorship of the 2023 FIFA Women's World Cup as a case of sportswashing, stating that "It would be quite the irony for Saudi’s tourism body to sponsor the largest celebration of women’s sport in the world when you consider that, as a woman in Saudi Arabia, you can’t even have a job without the permission of your male guardian." He also criticised the reform policies of Mohammed bin Salman as mere "publicity stunts" to diversify the Saudi economy.

=== Other roles ===
Foster was formerly Director of the Council on Australia Latin America Relations with the Department of Foreign Affairs and Trade.

Foster was the chair of the Australian Republic Movement (ARM) Up until May 2024, he was the co-chair of ARM alongside former Olympian and senator Nova Peris, who resigned to disagreements with Foster's criticism of Israel during the Gaza war. Peris, a supporter of Israel, accused Foster of making "inaccurate and divisive public statements" in regards to the war. Following this, Foster himself stood down.

He has volunteered with Play for Lives (#PlayForLives), a response to the COVID-19 pandemic by sporting people and bodies, which began in Australia and expanded internationally. He is a driving force behind "#RacismNotWelcome", a grassroots campaign initiated the Addison Road Community Centre, supported by local government associations across Australia. Their strategy includes building street signs bearing the slogan "#RacismNotWelcome" in every local council in Australia.

As of 2022 Foster also holds the following positions:

- Adjunct Professor of Sport & Social Responsibility with Torrens University
- Ambassador for The Big Issue Street Soccer Program
- Member of the Australia Committee of Human Rights Watch
- Director of the Nangala Foundation for early literacy in Indigenous communities and the Moriarty Foundation football programs
- Member of the Advisory Council of the Australian Human Rights Institute at UNSW
- Member of Affinity Intercultural Foundation
- Director of the Crescent Foundation

== Recognition and honours ==
As a sports broadcaster with SBS, Foster won at least three Logie Awards for the Most Outstanding Sports Coverage as part of The World Game team at SBS. Australia's Round of 16 match against Italy in 2006 (at the 2007 Logies); and the 2018 World Cup in Russia (at the 2019 Logies). In 2015 Foster and Les Murray also accepted the Logie in 2015 for their coverage the 2014 World Cup by The World Game. (One source reports a win for the 2005 FIFA World Cup qualifier against Uruguay in Sydney, but this is not confirmed.)

In 2019, the Foster was recognised by the Australian Financial Review as a "True Australian Leader", while The Sydney Morning Herald listed him as one of the "People that Defined 2019".

In 2020 he was a finalist in the Australian Human Rights Commission's Human Rights Medal, for his work in advocating for Hakeem al-Araibi in 2019, and in the same year was awarded the NSW Humanitarian Award (awarded during Refugee Week each year by the NSW Service for the Treatment and Rehabilitation of Torture and Trauma Survivors) for his work with sport and human rights, and the Abyssinian Medal, as part of the 14th Australian Muslim Achievement Awards (AMAA) founded and hosted by the Mission of Hope and led by Hanan Dover.

He was a finalist for NSW Australian of the Year in 2021.

Artist Julian Meagher decided that he would paint a portrait of Foster each year until it was shortlisted for the prestigious Archibald Prize. His first attempt in 2020 did not make it, but in 2021 his portrait, named Fozzy, made the shortlist.

In 2021, Foster was appointed a Member of the Order of Australia (AM) for significant service to multiculturalism, to human rights and refugee support organisations, and to football.

== Addresses ==
- 2019: Opening address for the UN's Centre for Sport and Human Rights Conference in Geneva
- 2019: Higginbotham Lecture for RMIT University in Melbourne
- March 2022: Australian National University's "Australia and the World Lecture" (postponed from 2021), at the National Press Club of Australia
- April 2022: UniSA Nelson Mandela Lecture, presented by the Hawke Centre at Adelaide Convention Centre (postponed from 2021) in Adelaide.
- September 2026: 10th annual Human Rights Lecture, hosted by Curtin University's Centre for Human Rights Education, Perth, Western Australia

== Publications ==
Foster is a former columnist for the Sun Herald, and writes for The Sydney Morning Herald, The Age, The Guardian, and other publications.

Monographs include:

- Foster, Craig (May 2010), Fozz on Football, Hardie Grant Books, ISBN 978-1-74273-582-5
- Foster, Craig; Engel, Alexandra (29 October 2019), Fighting for Hakeem, Hachette Australia, ISBN 978-0-7336-4317-0 (Subtitled: How people power challenged two monarchies, a military junta and football's governing body FIFA... and won.)

== Personal life ==
Foster is married to Lara Foster, and they have three children, Jake, Jemma, and Charli. He wrote a dedication to them in Fighting for Hakeem.

He says he is an introvert, who does not relish social situations.

== Soccer career statistics ==
Scores and results list Australia's goal tally first, score column indicates score after each Foster goal.

List of international goals scored by Craig Foster
No.	Date	Venue	Opponent	Score	Result	Competition	Ref.
1	11 June 1997	Western Sydney Stadium, Parramatta, Australia	Solomon Islands	7–0	13–0	1998 FIFA World Cup qualification	
2	28 June 1997	North Harbour Stadium, North Shore, New Zealand	New Zealand	3–0	3–0	1998 FIFA World Cup qualification	
3	29 March 2000	Na Stínadlech, Teplice, Czech Republic	Czech Republic	1–3	1–3	Friendly	
4	15 June 2000	Olympic Park Stadium, Melbourne, Australia	Paraguay	1–0	2–1	Friendly	
5	19 June 2000	Stade Pater Te Hono Nui, Pīraʻe, Tahiti	Cook Islands	4–0	17–0	2000 OFC Nations Cup	
6	19 June 2000	Stade Pater Te Hono Nui, Pīraʻe, Tahiti	Cook Islands	6–0	17–0	2000 OFC Nations Cup	
7	19 June 2000	Stade Pater Te Hono Nui, Pīraʻe, Tahiti	Cook Islands	8–0	17–0	2000 OFC Nations Cup	
8	19 June 2000	Stade Pater Te Hono Nui, Pīraʻe, Tahiti	Cook Islands	14–0	17–0	2000 OFC Nations Cup	
9	28 June 2000	Stade Pater Te Hono Nui, Pīraʻe, Tahiti	New Zealand	2–0	2–0	2000 OFC Nations Cup	

== Soccer honours ==
- One of a team of 11 Hong Kong Top Footballers (an annual award) in the 1991–92 Hong Kong First Division League
- 1997 Oceania Footballer of the Year: nominee (5th overall)
- 2000 OFC Nations Cup: Top scorer
