= This Is Your Life (Australian TV series) =

- Genre: Reality; Documentary
- Presented by: Seven; Mike Willesee (1975); Digby Wolfe (1976); Roger Climpson (1977–1980); Melissa Doyle (2022); Nine; Mike Munro (1995–2005, 2008); Eddie McGuire (2011)
- Country of origin: Australia
- Original language: English
- No. of seasons: 17
- No. of episodes: 1,000+

Production
- Production locations: TCN-9 Sydney, New South Wales (1995–2005); GTV-9 Bendigo Street Richmond (2008); Docklands Studios Melbourne (2011); Sydney (2022–)
- Running time: 60 Minutes

Original release
- Network: Seven Network (1975–1980, 2022–); Nine Network (1995–2005, 2008, 2011)
- Release: 1975 – 1980; 1995 – 2005; 2008 – 2008; 28 February 2011 – 21 March 2011; 24 July 2022 – current

Related
- American version British version New Zealand version

This Is Your Life is an Australian television documentary and reality show, based on the American show of the same name, which was created, produced and originally hosted by Ralph Edwards, in which the presenter surprises celebrity guests with a show documenting their lives, with audience participation from their friends and family.

== Original broadcast ==
The original series began broadcasting in Australia in 1975 on the Seven Network, with Bill Lovelock as executive producer and Mike Willesee as host. Subsequent seasons were compered by Digby Wolfe (1976) and Roger Climpson (1977–1980).

== Nine Network versions ==
In 1995, the Nine Network relaunched the program with a 13-year successful run hosted by journalist Mike Munro. In November 2010, it was announced that the show would return on 28 February 2011 and be hosted by Eddie McGuire; however, it was not as successful, and after just four episodes the show did not return.

== Seven Network revival ==
On 27 January 2022, a revival for the Seven Network was announced, to be hosted by Melissa Doyle. The first episode, which aired on 24 July 2022, featured Olympic swimmer Ian Thorpe.
