= Thursday FC =

- Genre: Sport/variety
- Presented by: Lucy Zelić; David Zdrilic
- Theme music composer: Cartoon
- Country of origin: Australia
- Original language: English
- No. of seasons: 1
- No. of episodes: 20

Production
- Running time: 60 minutes (including commercials)

Original release
- Network: SBS2
- Release: 10 October 2013 – 20 February 2014

Thursday FC was an Australian sports variety television program which covered professional association football in Australia. It was shown on SBS2 and presented by Lucy Zelić and former footballer David Zdrilic.

== Overview ==
The format was loose and based on the BBC's Top-Gear style presentation format. Innovative use of graphics, social media and live music made the program stand out from the usual sport themed programs available to Australian audiences. Graphics used by the producers were in a comic book style and made the show visually memorable.

The show aired on Thursday nights, the first episode premiered on 10 October 2013 ahead of the first game of the 2013–14 A-League season. The program showcased the latest football news, views and opinions with a predominant focus on the A-League, the hour-long show was packed with entertainment, interviews and live performances. Each episode included a look at each upcoming A-League game for the round, highlights from the previous weekend of football as well as special guests including players, celebrity tipping and live music acts.

The TV series ceased in February 2014 after poor audience ratings. South Park replaced it after it was axed.

== Presenters ==
- Lucy Zelić (2013–2014)
- David Zdrilic (2013–2014)
- Matt Okine (2013–2014)

== Scheduling ==
The show aired once weekly on Thursday nights at 8:30 PM. It can also be viewed online and on many televisions with Smart capabilities through SBS on Demand.

== See also ==
- List of Australian television series
