= Valdeir Vieira =

Brazilian football manager (born 1944)

Personal information
- Full name: Valdeir Badu Vieira
- Date of birth: 11 July 1944 (age 82)
- Place of birth: Marília, São Paulo, Brazil

Managerial career
- Years: Team
- 1987–1988: Caracas
- 1989–1990: Deportivo Italia
- 1991–1992: Blumenau
- 1992–1994: Brusque
- 1994–1996: Alajuelense
- 1996–1997: Costa Rica
- 1997: FAS
- 1997: Iran
- 1998–1999: Oman
- 1999: Al-Ta'ee
- 2000: Al-Khaleej
- 2000: Raja Casablanca
- 2000–2001: Deportivo Saprissa
- 2001–2003: Al Arabi
- 2003–2005: Dhofar
- 2005–2006: Al Arabi
- 2006–2009: Nagano Parceiro
- 2010–2013: Bahrain
- 2013: Al-Ramtha
- 2014: Kyoto Sanga

Valdeir "Badú" Vieira (born 11 July 1944 in Marília, São Paulo) is a Brazilian football manager.

== Career ==
=== Playing career ===
Like many Brazilian players in the 1960s, Badu was discovered in the ever-expanding futsal scene. It is from the indoors that Vieira gets his nickname "Badu", which describes a specific way of scoring a goal. He signed his first contract as a professional with the 2nd division Dracena F.C. at age 17. Two years later he played as attacker in the 1st division with CE Aymoré – São Leopoldo, where Luiz Felipe Scolari was just starting his career as a defender in the youth team. Badu was later the first Brazilian to play respectively for the clubs: Central Español (Uruguay), Hibernians F.C. (Malta) and Croissant Club Sigois (Algeria). Plagued by injuries and more interested in studying the sciences of sports, he finished his career playing non-league football in Germany.

=== Coaching career ===
Badu has managed several clubs and national football teams. He managed Costa Rica during 1996 and Oman from 1998 to 1999. He managed Iran during their successful qualification for the 1998 FIFA World Cup. On 28 December 2013, Vieira signed with Japan's J2 League side Kyoto Sanga FC, which he managed until 18 June 2014.

== Managerial statistics ==
Team	From	To	Record				
Team	From	To	G	W	D	L	Win %
Iran	1997	1997	3	0	2	1	0.00
Kyoto Sanga FC	2014	2014	18	7	5	6	38.89
Total			21	7	7	7	33.33

== Honours ==
- 1987 Venezuela Coach of the Year
- 1988 Copa de Venezuela
- 1992 Best Newcomer in the Campeonato Catarinense
- 1995 Best foreign coach in Costa Rica
- 1995–96 Primera División de Costa Rica Winner
- 1996 Copa Interclubes UNCAF
- 1996–97 Primera División de Costa Rica Winner
- 2001–02 Kuwaiti Premier League Winner
- 2001–02 Al Kurafi Cup Winner
- 2003 Gulf Club Champions Cup Winner
- 2008 JFL Regional League Champions
- 2008 Japan National Amateur Champions
- 2009 Hokushin'etsu Regional Div.1 Runners Up
- 2010–11 Bahrain 2nd Division Champions
