= Ebrahim Tahami =

Iranian footballer

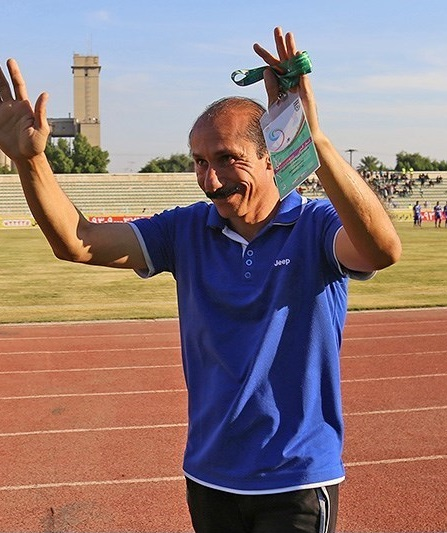

Personal information
- Date of birth: September 21, 1966 (age 60)
- Place of birth: Abadan, Iran
- Position: Midfielder

Team information
- Current team: Esteghlal Ahvaz (assistant manager)

Senior career*
Years	Team	Apps	(Gls)
1986–1990	Sanat Naft		
1990–1994	Esteghlal Ahvaz		
1994–1995	Al Sahel		
1995–1997	Esteghlal Ahvaz		
1996	→ Esteghlal (loan)	2	(0)
1997	Sanat Naft	17	(3)
1997–2000	Esteghlal Ahvaz		
2000–2001	Foolad	18	(0)
2001–2002	Esteghlal Ahvaz		

International career
1993–1997	Iran	10	(1)

Managerial career
- 1996–2002: Esteghlal Ahvaz (assistant)
- 1998: Esteghlal Ahvaz (caretaker)
- 2002: Esteghlal Ahvaz (caretaker)
- 2002–2003: Esteghlal Ahvaz (assistant)
- 2004–2006: Rah Ahan (assistant)
- 2006–2007: Esteghlal Ahvaz (assistant)
- 2015–: Esteghlal Ahvaz (assistant)
- 2016: Esteghlal Ahvaz (caretaker)
- * Club domestic league appearances and goals

Seyed Ebrahim Tahami (Persian: سیدابراهیم تهامی, born 21 September 1966 in Abadan) is an Iranian former professional who played as a midfielder for Sanat Naft Abadan, Esteghlal Ahvaz, Esteghlal Tehran and the Iran national team.
