= Ned Zelic =

Australian soccer player (born 1971)

Personal information
- Date of birth: 4 July 1971 (age 55)
- Place of birth: Sydney, Australia
- Positions: Centre-back; defensive midfielder

Youth career
- 1981–1987: Canberra FC
- 1988: AIS

Senior career*
Years	Team	Apps	(Gls)
1989–1991	Sydney Croatia	36	(0)
1991–1992	Sydney Olympic	16	(1)
1992–1995	Borussia Dortmund	72	(1)
1995–1996	Queens Park Rangers	4	(0)
1996	Eintracht Frankfurt	20	(4)
1996–1997	Auxerre	18	(4)
1997–2001	1860 Munich	102	(3)
2002	Kyoto Purple Sanga	1	(0)
2002–2003	Urawa Reds	23	(2)
2004–2005	Wacker Tirol	22	(0)
2005–2006	Newcastle Jets	21	(1)
2006	Helmond Sport	7	(0)
2007–2008	Dinamo Tbilisi	34	(0)
Total		372	(16)

International career
1989	Australia U-20	8	(2)
1990–1992	Australia U-23	16	(4)
1991–1999	Australia	46	(7)
Medal record
Representing Australia
Men's Association football
FIFA Confederations Cup
Runner-up	1997
- * Club domestic league appearances and goals

Ned Zelic (born 4 July 1971) is an Australian former footballer who played as a centre-back or defensive midfielder.

== Club career ==
Zelic started his career in the old Australian National Soccer League, where he played with clubs Sydney Croatia and Sydney Olympic. In his junior years he played for Croatia Deakin.

Zelic spent most of the 1990s playing in Europe, most notably for Borussia Dortmund where he reached the UEFA Cup Final in his first season with the club, losing to Juventus of Italy and won the German Bundesliga title in 1995. He had a brief stint in the Premier League for QPR, moving for a club record £1.25 million, which was beset by injury and discontent. After just 4 Premier League games for the West London club, he departed to Eintracht Frankfurt in Germany.

After only a few months he signed for AJ Auxerre of France. At Auxerre, he replaced Laurent Blanc who moved to FC Barcelona, and participated in the UEFA Champions League. In July 1996, Zelic was selected to play for a World All Star team v Brazil at Giants Stadium, New York City. The All Star team was coached by Euro 92 winner with Denmark, Richard Moller Nielsen and consisted of such players as Jürgen Klinsmann, George Weah, Marcel Desailly, Lothar Matthäus, David Ginola and Fernando Redondo. In 1998, Zelic decided to move back to Germany and went on to make 102 appearances for 1860 Munich in the Bundesliga.

In 2002, he moved to Japan to play in the J1 League where he stayed for two years and played under Dutch coaches Hans Ooft and Wim Jansen, winning the Japanese Cup with his club Urawa Red Diamonds. Zelic signed for FC Wacker Tirol of Austria in July 2004 and stayed there for one season.

=== A-League ===
In 2005, Ned Zelic agreed terms to a two-year deal as a marquee to captain the Newcastle Jets in the A-League, where he played out the whole season from central defence. The Jets finished fourth on the league table and lost to the Central Coast Mariners 2–1 on aggregate over two legs in the Minor Semi-final.

Zelic underwent arthroscopic surgery on his knee after the semi-finals. Several months later he decided to move back overseas and it was not certain if he would continue his career.

=== Europe ===
After being granted a work permit, he signed a one-year deal with Dutch side Helmond Sport in August 2006, working again with his former 1860 Munich teammate Gerald Vanenburg, who was coach there. However, he left Helmond after only two months due to knee problems and considered retirement.

In January 2007, Zelic joined Georgian club FC Dinamo Tbilisi on a free transfer, where he played under former Czech National Team coach Dusan Uhrin. He announced his retirement from football in May 2008, after winning the Georgian Championship with Dinamo Tbilisi.

He was selected in Four Four Two magazine's Top 25 Australian Footballers of All-Time.

== International career ==
He has played for the Australia youth, Olympic and senior teams, but made himself unavailable in November 1999 after disagreements with coach Frank Farina. Zelic was captain of the Australian team that competed and finished 4th at the 1992 Summer Olympics in Barcelona.

== Personal life ==
Ned Zelic attended Wanniassa High School in Canberra, ACT. Zelic is the older brother of former footballer turned actor Ivan Zelic and presenter Lucy Zelić.

== Career statistics ==
=== Club ===
Appearances and goals by club, season and competition
Club	Season	League			Cup		League Cup		Total	
Club	Season	Division	Apps	Goals	Apps	Goals	Apps	Goals	Apps	Goals
Sydney Croatia	1989	National Soccer League	8	0					8	0
Sydney Croatia	1989–90	National Soccer League	2	0					2	0
Sydney Croatia	1990–91	National Soccer League	26	0					26	0
Sydney Croatia	Total		36	0					36	0
Sydney Olympic	1991–92	National Soccer League	16	1					16	1
Borussia Dortmund	1992–93	Bundesliga	19	0					19	0
Borussia Dortmund	1993–94	Bundesliga	18	1					18	1
Borussia Dortmund	1994–95	Bundesliga	4	0					4	0
Borussia Dortmund	Total		41	1					41	1
Queens Park Rangers	1995–96	Premier League	4	0					4	0
Eintracht Frankfurt	1995–96	Bundesliga	17	1					17	1
Auxerre	1996–97	Division 1	12	0					12	0
1860 Munich	1997–98	Bundesliga	13	0					13	0
1860 Munich	1998–99	Bundesliga	33	1					33	1
1860 Munich	1999–2000	Bundesliga	23	2					23	2
1860 Munich	2000–01	Bundesliga	27	0					27	0
1860 Munich	2001–02	Bundesliga	6	0					6	0
1860 Munich	Total		102	3					102	3
Kyoto Purple Sanga	2002	J1 League	1	0	0	0	0	0	1	0
Urawa Reds	2002	J1 League	1	0	1	0	0	0	2	0
Urawa Reds	2003	J1 League	22	2	1	0	7	0	30	2
Urawa Reds	Total		23	2	2	0	7	0	32	2
Wacker Tirol	2004–05	Austrian Bundesliga	22	0					22	0
Newcastle United Jets	2005–06	A-League	21	1					21	1
Helmond Sport	2006–07	Eerste Divisie	7	0					7	0
Dinamo Tbilisi	2006–07	Umaglesi Liga	11	0					11	0
Career total			313	9	2	0	7	0	322	9

=== International ===
Appearances and goals by national team and year
National team	Year	Apps	Goals
Australia	1991	6	1
Australia	1992	5	0
Australia	1993	5	1
Australia	1994	2	0
Australia	1995	3	0
Australia	1996	0	0
Australia	1997	15	2
Australia	1998	0	0
Australia	1999	2	1
Total		38	5

== Honours ==
Dinamo Tbilisi

- Umaglesi Liga: 2007–2008

Urawa Reds

- J.League Cup: 2003

Borussia Dortmund

- Bundesliga: 1994–1995
- UEFA Cup: runners-up 1992–93

Australia

- FIFA Confederations Cup: runner-up, 1997
