= Toyota World Sport =

Australian television series

- Genre: Sports
- Presented by: Les Murray (weekdays); Liz Deep-Jones (weekends)
- Country of origin: Australia
- Original language: English

Production
- Running time: 30 minutes

Original release
- Network: SBS
- Release: 1990 – December 2006

Toyota World Sport was an Australian television sport news program. Airing on SBS at 7pm local time, the long-running show was axed in December 2006.

The show aired at 7pm following SBS' 6.30 news (and repeated the following day at 4pm), and was hosted by Les Murray on weekdays, and Liz Deep-Jones on weekends.

== Presenters ==
Stephanie Brantz was originally a weekend presenter of the show, but joined Les Murray as a co-host during 2006, before she defected to the Nine Network in August of that year. Other hosts during this period included Mike Tomalaris and Simon Hill.

Robert Grasso, Kyle Patterson, Andrew Orsatti, Janice Petersen, Mieke Buchanan, John Baldock, Farren Hotham and Emma Simkin were among the show's award-winning team of journalists. Craig Norenbergs, Mike Tomalaris and Bridget Tilley also worked as producers during its long run.

== Cancellation ==
Despite its successful ratings with the FIFA World Cup and the Tour de France in 2006, the show was axed in favour of an extended one-hour news program that incorporates sport news, because SBS management was worried about the drop in viewers after the 6.30pm news.

== See also ==
- List of Australian television series
