= Les Murray (broadcaster) =

Australian sports journalist (1945–2017)

Les Murray AM
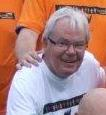
- Born: László Ürge; 5 November 1945; Pápa, Kingdom of Hungary
- Died: 31 July 2017 (aged 71); Sydney, New South Wales, Australia
- Occupations: Broadcaster, sports journalist, analyst
- Years active: 1971–2014
- Children: 2

Les James Murray AM (born László Ürge [ˈyrɡæ ˈlaːsloː]; 5 November 1945 – 31 July 2017) was a Hungarian-born Australian sports journalist, association football (soccer) broadcaster and analyst. He was the host of The World Game on SBS television, retiring in July 2014, and has been inducted into the FFA's Football Hall of Fame.

As the country's most prominent TV presenter of football, Murray played a major role in the sport's growing popularity in Australia beginning in the 1980s. Murray coined the phrase "the world game", which later became the title of SBS's football programme.

== Early life and education ==
Murray was born as László Ürge in Pápa, Hungary, the second of three sons of József and Erzsébet Ürge née Ihrig. In the aftermath of the Hungarian Revolution at the end of 1956, the family immigrated to Australia in 1957 under the Hungarian Refugee Assisted Scheme. They resided at Wollongong, New South Wales after some time at Bonegilla Migrant Camp near Wodonga.

He was educated at Berkeley High School.

He decided to anglicise his name because Ürge was difficult for non-Hungarians to pronounce and made him prone to taunts. The surname Murray was suggested by his father, as "Muray" is also Hungarian for "of the Mura River".

== Career ==
Murray's passion for football, in which he had been interested from an early age, was sparked after watching a replay of the 1960 European Cup Final. He began work as a journalist in 1971. In between, he found time to perform in a small rock music group, 'The Rubber Band', where he was lead singer. He moved to Network Ten as a commentator in 1977, changing his name from László Ürge to Les Murray at that time.

Murray moved to SBS in 1980 as a Hungarian language subtitler but soon turned to covering football. He was the host for SBS coverage of Football including the World Cups from 1986 to 2014, as well as Australia's World Cup Qualifiers, most memorably in 1997, 2001 and 2005. He also anchored the SBS team at friendlies and international tournaments in which junior and women's national teams are competing.

SBS sports programs hosted by Murray have included On the Ball (1984–2000), Toyota World Sports (c. 1990 – 2006) and The World Game (2001-his death). On the Ball was co-hosted by former Socceroo, Johnny Warren, who followed Murray to The World Game as chief analyst. Besides those programmes the pair had commentated on football matches for decades.

Murray was made a Member of the Order of Australia for services to Football on 12 June 2006 as part of the Queen's Birthday honours list.

In 2006, Murray stepped down from his position as SBS's Sports Director to become an editorial supervisor for SBS, while his on-air role remained the same. His main motive for this decision was to concentrate on his range of presentation duties as the 'face' of SBS Sport.

On 23 January 2008 Murray was featured in Food Safari episode Hungarian, where he showed Maeve O'Meara how to make rakott krumpli.

He was a member of the FIFA Ethics Committee.

In 2009, he was awarded Australian Sports Commission Media Award Lifetime Achievement Award.

In August 2011, Murray won the inaugural 'Blogger of the Year' award at the FFDU Australian Football Media awards, ultimately defeating fellow finalists Matthew Collard and Christian Layland.

In June 2014, he announced his retirement as chief football commentator on SBS, to begin after the FIFA World Cup, although he continued to appear in guest spots on SBS.

On 12 December 2021, Les was posthumously inducted to the Sydney Cricket Ground Media Hall of Honour, alongside 11 others added to the inaugural 15 media personalities who were first celebrated in 2014.

== Controversy ==
In 2011, Murray published a book titled The World Game: The Story of How Football Went Global, in which Murray cited an undisclosed source in alleging that Lucas Neill, the captain of the Socceroos, had instigated a mutiny just before the Germany vs Australia game at the 2010 FIFA World Cup (in which the Australians were defeated by the Germans 4–0). Murray alleged that Neill had asked his coach, Pim Verbeek, to leave the room, before describing Verbeek's game-plan as "bullshit" and erasing what the Dutchman had written on a whiteboard, telling the team to play like they normally do. The publication of this story was followed by responses from team members who had been eyewitnesses of the actual events, including Craig Moore, Eugene Galeković, and Mile Jedinak, stating that the event portrayed in Murray's book never occurred. Neill protested that before the Germany game it was Mark Schwarzer, and not Neill himself, who had given the team pep talk. A few days after the allegations hit the news, Murray retracted his allegations with a full apology, with an undertaking that future editions of his book would have the relevant portion deleted.

The same year then-SBS journalist Jesse Fink accused Murray of conflict of interest at SBS over his Ethics Committee role at FIFA. In 2020, Fink wrote a piece on his website explaining the chronology of his dispute with Murray.

== Personal life ==
Murray was married to Eva Katina, and they had two daughters, Natalie and Tania, before divorcing. He then had a long-term relationship with partner Maria.

== Death and legacy ==
On 31 July 2017, Murray died of a cancer-related illness in Sydney, aged 71. He was given a state funeral at St Mary's Cathedral in Sydney.

SBS awards the Les Murray Award for Refugee Recognition, to recognise "an outstanding former refugee raising awareness of the plight of forcibly displaced people".

Craig Foster delivered a eulogy for Murray at his state funeral, remarking on the need for Australia "to become a football nation, and to win the ultimate prize - the FIFA World Cup. Les believed it was possible [...] and it can be done".

== In popular culture ==
- Murray appeared with the Australian alternative rock band TISM in their song "What Nationality Is Les Murray?" When the album on which the song appears, Machiavelli and the Four Seasons, won the 1995 ARIA Award for Best Independent Release, Murray accepted the award on the band's behalf with a few lines in his native Hungarian: Amikor eljön a forradalom, a zeneipar lesz az első amely menni fog. Köszönöm szépen. ("When the revolution comes, the music industry will be the first to go. Thank you very much.") The clip of Murray's acceptance of the award can be seen in the video for TISM's "Gold! Gold!! Gold!!!"
- Ahead of the 2014 FIFA World Cup in Brazil, Melbourne band Vaudeville Smash released the Football anthem "Zinedine Zidane". The song features Murray rhyming the names of football greats such as Juan Sebastián Verón with Gianluigi Buffon.
- The SBS comedy/variety show In Siberia Tonight regularly featured a segment with host Steve Abbott talking to Indira Naidoo at the "Les Murray Bar".
