= 1998 FIFA World Cup qualification (AFC) =

Tournament details
- Teams: 36 (from 1 confederation)

Tournament statistics
- Top scorer(s): (Iran) Karim Bagheri (19 goals)

Listed below are the dates and results for the 1998 FIFA World Cup qualification rounds for the Asian zone (AFC). For an overview of the qualification rounds, see the article 1998 FIFA World Cup qualification.

== Format ==
A total of 36 teams entered the competition. The Asian zone was allocated 3.5 places (out of 32) in the final tournament.

There were three rounds of play:

- First round: The 36 teams were divided into 10 groups of 3 or 4 teams each. The teams played against each other twice, except in Group 10, where the teams played against each other once. The group winners advanced to the second round. Each group were decided on its system of play.
- Second round: The 10 teams were divided into 2 groups of 5 teams. The teams played against each other on a home-and-away basis. The group winners qualified for the World Cup. The runners-up advanced to the third round.
- Third round: The two teams played against each other once in Malaysia. The winner qualify for the World Cup. The loser advanced to the AFC–OFC intercontinental play-offs.

== First round ==
=== Group 1 ===
Pos	Team	Pld	W	D	L	GF	GA	GD	Pts	Qualification
1	Saudi Arabia	6	5	1	0	18	1	+17	16	Second round
2	Malaysia	6	3	2	1	5	3	+2	11	
3	Chinese Taipei	6	1	1	4	4	13	−9	4	
4	Bangladesh	6	1	0	5	4	14	−10	3	

Source: RSSSF

=== Group 2 ===
Pos	Team	Pld	W	D	L	GF	GA	GD	Pts	Qualification
1	Iran	6	5	1	0	39	3	+36	16	Second round
2	Syria	6	3	1	2	30	5	+25	10	
3	Kyrgyzstan	6	3	0	3	12	14	−2	9	
4	Maldives	6	0	0	6	0	59	−59	0	

Source: RSSSF

=== Group 3 ===
Pos	Team	Pld	W	D	L	GF	GA	GD	Pts	Qualification
1	United Arab Emirates	4	3	1	0	7	1	+6	10	Second round
2	Jordan	4	1	1	2	4	4	0	4	
3	Bahrain	4	1	0	3	3	9	−6	3	

Source: RSSSF

=== Group 4 ===
Pos	Team	Pld	W	D	L	GF	GA	GD	Pts	Qualification
1	Japan	6	5	1	0	31	1	+30	16	Second round
2	Oman	6	4	1	1	14	2	+12	13	
3	Macau	6	1	1	4	3	28	−25	4	
4	Nepal	6	0	1	5	2	19	−17	1	

Source: RSSSF

=== Group 5 ===
Pos	Team	Pld	W	D	L	GF	GA	GD	Pts	Qualification
1	Uzbekistan	6	5	1	0	20	3	+17	16	Second round
2	Yemen	6	2	2	2	10	7	+3	8	
3	Indonesia	6	1	4	1	11	6	+5	7	
4	Cambodia	6	0	1	5	2	27	−25	1	

Source: RSSSF

=== Group 6 ===
Pos	Team	Pld	W	D	L	GF	GA	GD	Pts	Qualification
1	South Korea	4	3	1	0	9	1	+8	10	Second round
2	Thailand	4	1	1	2	5	6	−1	4	
3	Hong Kong	4	1	0	3	3	10	−7	3	

Source: RSSSF

=== Group 7 ===
Pos	Team	Pld	W	D	L	GF	GA	GD	Pts	Qualification
1	Kuwait	4	4	0	0	10	1	+9	12	Second round
2	Lebanon	4	1	1	2	4	7	−3	4	
3	Singapore	4	0	1	3	2	8	−6	1	

Source: RSSSF

=== Group 8 ===
Pos	Team	Pld	W	D	L	GF	GA	GD	Pts	Qualification
1	China	6	5	1	0	13	2	+11	16	Second round
2	Tajikistan	6	4	1	1	15	2	+13	13	
3	Turkmenistan	6	2	0	4	8	13	−5	6	
4	Vietnam	6	0	0	6	2	21	−19	0	

Source: RSSSF

=== Group 9 ===
Pos	Team	Pld	W	D	L	GF	GA	GD	Pts	Qualification
1	Kazakhstan	4	4	0	0	15	2	+13	12	Second round
2	Iraq	4	2	0	2	14	8	+6	6	
3	Pakistan	4	0	0	4	3	22	−19	0	

Source: RSSSF

=== Group 10 ===
Pos	Team	Pld	W	D	L	GF	GA	GD	Pts	Qualification
1	Qatar	3	3	0	0	14	0	+14	9	Second round
2	Sri Lanka	3	1	1	1	4	4	0	4	
3	India	3	1	1	1	3	7	−4	4	
4	Philippines	3	0	0	3	0	10	−10	0	

Source: RSSSF

== Second round ==
=== Group A ===
Pos	Team	Pld	W	D	L	GF	GA	GD	Pts	Qualification
1	Saudi Arabia	8	4	2	2	8	6	+2	14	1998 FIFA World Cup
2	Iran	8	3	3	2	13	8	+5	12	Third round
3	China	8	3	2	3	11	14	−3	11	
4	Qatar	8	3	1	4	7	10	−3	10	
5	Kuwait	8	2	2	4	7	8	−1	8	

Source: RSSSF

=== Group B ===
Pos	Team	Pld	W	D	L	GF	GA	GD	Pts	Qualification
1	South Korea	8	6	1	1	19	7	+12	19	1998 FIFA World Cup
2	Japan	8	3	4	1	17	9	+8	13	Third round
3	United Arab Emirates	8	2	3	3	9	12	−3	9	
4	Uzbekistan	8	1	3	4	13	18	−5	6	
5	Kazakhstan	8	1	3	4	7	19	−12	6	

Source: RSSSF

== Third round ==
- The third round (play-off) was played over a single leg at a neutral venue.
- Extra time was played using the golden goal rule.
16 November 1997
21:00 UTC+8

Iran	2–3 (a.e.t.)	Japan
Azizi 46'; Daei 58'	report (FIFA) report (Japanese)	Nakayama 39'; Jo 75'; Okano 118'

Larkin Stadium, Johor Bahru, Malaysia
Attendance: 22,000
Referee: Manuel Diaz Vega (Spain)

== Inter-confederation play-offs ==
Team 1	Agg.	Team 2	1st leg	2nd leg
Iran	3–3 (a)	Australia	1–1	2–2

3–3 on aggregate, Iran won on away goals

== Qualified teams ==
The following four teams from AFC qualified for the final tournament.

Team	Qualified as	Qualified on	Previous appearances in FIFA World Cup^{1}
Saudi Arabia	Final round group A winners	12 November 1997	1 (1994)
South Korea	Final round group B winners	18 October 1997	4 (1954, 1986, 1990, 1994)
Japan	Play-off winners	16 November 1997	0 (debut)
Iran	AFC–OFC play-off winners	29 November 1997	1 (1978)

^{1} Bold indicates champions for that year. Italic indicates hosts for that year.

== Goalscorers ==
There were 459 goals scored in 132 matches (including 2 international play-offs), for an average of 3.53 goals per match.

19 goals

- (Iran) Karim Bagheri

14 goals

- (Japan) Kazuyoshi Miura

9 goals

- (Iran) Ali Daei
- (South Korea) Choi Yong-soo

8 goals

- (Iran) Khodadad Azizi
- (Qatar) Mohammed Salem Al-Enazi
- (Uzbekistan) Oleg Shatskikh

7 goals

- (Japan) Takuya Takagi
- (Saudi Arabia) Khaled Al-Muwallid

6 goals

- (China) Hao Haidong
- (Syria) Said Bayazid

5 goals

- (Japan) Hidetoshi Nakata
- (Kuwait) Jasem Al Huwaidi
- (Saudi Arabia) Ibrahim Al-Shahrani
- (Yemen) Omar Al Ariki

4 goals

- (China) Fan Zhiyi
- (Iran) Mehdi Mahdavikia
- (Iran) Alireza Mansourian
- (Iraq) Hussam Fawzi
- (Kazakhstan) Viktor Zubarev
- (Kuwait) Bashar Abdulaziz
- (Syria) Nihad Al Boushi
- (Tajikistan) Arsen Avakov
- (United Arab Emirates) Khamees Saad Mubarak
- (Uzbekistan) Ravshan Bozorov
- (Uzbekistan) Andrei Fyodorov
- (Uzbekistan) Igor Shkvyrin

3 goals

- (China) Gao Feng
- (Indonesia) Rocky Putiray
- (Indonesia) Widodo Putro
- (Iran) Hamid Estili
- (Iran) Reza Shahroudi
- (Iraq) Laith Hussein
- (Japan) Yutaka Akita
- (Japan) Wagner Lopes
- (Japan) Hiroshi Nanami
- (Kazakhstan) Boulat Esmagambetov
- (Kazakhstan) Vladimir Loginov
- (Kazakhstan) Pavel Yevteyev
- (Kyrgyzstan) Sergey Kutsov
- (Oman) Ahmed Hassan
- (Qatar) Mahmoud Soufi
- (Saudi Arabia) Obeid Al-Dosari
- (Saudi Arabia) Sami Al-Jaber
- (Saudi Arabia) Fahad Al-Mehallel
- (South Korea) Kim Do-hoon
- (South Korea) Lee Sang-yoon
- (South Korea) Yoo Sang-chul
- (Syria) Nader Joukhadar
- (Syria) Khaled Al Zaher
- (Tajikistan) Shukhrat Dzhaborov
- (Tajikistan) Takhirdjon Mouminov
- (Turkmenistan) Mouslim Agaev
- (United Arab Emirates) Zuhair Bakheet

2 goals

- (Bangladesh) Mohammed Jewel Rana
- (Cambodia) Hok Sochetra
- (China) Li Bing
- (China) Ma Mingyu
- (China) Peng Weiguo
- (Indonesia) Ansyari Lubis
- (Indonesia) Ronny Wabia
- (Iran) Mehrdad Minavand
- (Iran) Ali Asghar Modir Roosta
- (Iraq) Sahib Abbas
- (Iraq) Qahtan Chathir
- (Japan) Shoji Jo
- (Japan) Hiroaki Morishima
- (Japan) Masashi Nakayama
- (Japan) Akinori Nishizawa
- (Japan) Norio Omura
- (Jordan) Jeris Tadrus
- (Kazakhstan) Alexei Klishin
- (Kazakhstan) Nourken Mazbaev
- (Kuwait) Fawaz Al Ahmad
- (Kuwait) Hamed Al Saleh
- (Kyrgyzstan) Farhat Haitbaev
- (Kyrgyzstan) Aleksandr Merzlikin
- (Lebanon) Abdulfattah Shehab
- (Oman) Mahfood Sultan Al Araimi
- (Oman) Saeed Shaaban Al Busaidy
- (Oman) Majdi Shaaban Samir
- (Pakistan) Mohammad Umer
- (Qatar) Zamel Al Kuwari
- (Qatar) Adel Khamis Al Noobi
- (Qatar) Fazli
- (South Korea) Choi Moon-sik
- (South Korea) Ha Seok-ju
- (South Korea) Seo Jung-won
- (Sri Lanka) Roshan Perera
- (Syria) Aref Al Agha
- (Syria) Tarek Jabban
- (Tajikistan) Oumed Alidodov
- (Tajikistan) Viacheslav Knizaev
- (Thailand) Natipong Sritong-In
- (United Arab Emirates) Adnan Al Talyani
- (United Arab Emirates) Adel Mohamed Abdulla
- (Uzbekistan) Numon Khasanov
- (Uzbekistan) Sergey Lebedev
- (Uzbekistan) Shukhrat Maksudov
- (Uzbekistan) Abdukahhor Marifaliev
- (Uzbekistan) Nikolai Shirshov

1 goal

- (Bahrain) Khaled Al-Doseri
- (Bahrain) Hameed Darwish
- (Bahrain) Faisal Aziz Rashed
- (Bangladesh) Mohammed Alfaz Ahmed
- (Bangladesh) Ahmed Imtiaz
- (China) Li Jinyu
- (China) Li Ming
- (China) Mao Yijun
- (China) Su Maozhen
- (China) Zhang Enhua
- (Chinese Taipei) Chen Kuei-jen
- (Chinese Taipei) Hsu Te Ming
- (Chinese Taipei) Huang Che-ming
- (Chinese Taipei) Lin Wen Han
- (Hong Kong) Au Wai Lun
- (Hong Kong) Cheng Sin Siu
- (Hong Kong) Lee Kin Woo
- (India) Carlton Chapman
- (India) Bruno Coutinho
- (India) Raman Vijayan
- (Indonesia) Sudirman
- (Iran) Farhad Majidi
- (Iran) Ali Mousavi
- (Iraq) Haidar Abdullah
- (Iraq) Ahmed Radhi
- (Iraq) Sadiq Saadoun
- (Japan) Yasuto Honda
- (Japan) Masami Ihara
- (Japan) Masayuki Okano
- (Japan) Naoki Soma
- (Japan) Motohiro Yamaguchi
- (Jordan) Basam Al-Khateeb
- (Jordan) Hassouneh Al-Sheikh
- (Kazakhstan) Ruslan Baltiyev
- (Kazakhstan) Vitali Sparyshev
- (Kazakhstan) Valeri Yablochkin
- (Kazakhstan) Dmitri Yurist
- (Kuwait) Faisal Al Otaibi
- (Kuwait) Hani Al Saqer
- (Kuwait) Jamal Mubarak
- (Kuwait) Abdullah Saihan
- (Kyrgyzstan) Vladimir Chertkov
- (Kyrgyzstan) Sergei Ivanov
- (Kyrgyzstan) Alexandr Korzanov
- (Kyrgyzstan) Kanat Sardarov
- (Kyrgyzstan) Rafik Yusupov
- (Lebanon) Babkin Melikian
- (Lebanon) Wael Nazha
- (Macau) Che Chi Man
- (Macau) Cheang Chon Man
- (Macau) José Maria da Cruz Martins
- (Malaysia) Idris Abdul Karim
- (Malaysia) Azman Adnan
- (Malaysia) Ahmad Che Zambil
- (Malaysia) Rosdee Sulong
- (Malaysia) Zainal Abidin Hassan
- (Nepal) Deepak Amatya
- (Nepal) Hari Khadka
- (Oman) Mohamed Tayib Abdul Noor
- (Oman) Farid Al Masori
- (Oman) Nabeel Mubar Al Siyabi
- (Pakistan) Zahir Rafiq
- (Qatar) Dahi Al Naemi
- (Qatar) Abdul Jaloof
- (Qatar) Nasir Khamees
- (Qatar) Waleed Bakhit Maayof
- (Saudi Arabia) Abdulaziz Al-Dosari
- (Saudi Arabia) Abdullah Al-Dosari
- (Saudi Arabia) Khalid Al-Temawi
- (Saudi Arabia) Yousuf Al-Thunayan
- (Saudi Arabia) Khamis Al-Zahrani
- (Singapore) Chuan Tan Teng
- (Singapore) Zulkarnaen Zainal
- (South Korea) Ko Jeong-woon
- (South Korea) Lee Min-sung
- (South Korea) Park Kun-ha
- (South Korea) Roh Sang-rae
- (Sri Lanka) Anton Silva
- (Sri Lanka) Chaminda Steinwall
- (Syria) Redwan Abrash
- (Syria) Ali Cheikh Dib
- (Syria) Abdel Kader Rifai
- (Syria) Ammar Rihawi
- (Syria) Bashar Srour
- (Syria) Loay Taleb
- (Tajikistan) Alier Achourmamadov
- (Thailand) Dusit Chalermsan
- (Thailand) Krissada Piandit
- (Thailand) Piyapong Pue-on
- (Turkmenistan) Redjeb Agabaev
- (Turkmenistan) Valeri Broshin
- (Turkmenistan) Valeri Gulyan
- (Turkmenistan) Djumadurdy Meredov
- (Turkmenistan) Georgi Tkavadze
- (United Arab Emirates) Bakhit Alabadla
- (United Arab Emirates) Gholam Ali
- (United Arab Emirates) Hassan Mubarak
- (United Arab Emirates) Mohamed Obaid
- (United Arab Emirates) Ahmed Saeed
- (Uzbekistan) Jafar Irismetov
- (Uzbekistan) Bahtior Kambaraliev
- (Uzbekistan) Mirdjalal Kasimov
- (Vietnam) Lê Huỳnh Đức
- (Vietnam) Nguyễn Công Vinh
- (Yemen) Abdul Rahman Abdulla
- (Yemen) Jeyeb Bashafal
- (Yemen) Esam Dariban
- (Yemen) Munif Shaef Noman
- (Yemen) Mohammed Zughair

1 own goal

- (Iraq) Sadiq Saadoun (playing against Kazakhstan)
- (Nepal) Raju Kaji Shakya (playing against Oman)
