= 1998 FIFA World Cup qualification – AFC first round =

International football competition

The AFC first round of 1998 FIFA World Cup qualification was contested between 36 AFC members.

The top country in each group at the end of the stage progressed to the final round, where the ten remaining teams will be divided into two groups of five.

== Group 1 ==
Pos	Team	Pld	W	D	L	GF	GA	GD	Pts	Qualification
1	Saudi Arabia (H)	6	5	1	0	18	1	+17	16	Final round
2	Malaysia (H)	6	3	2	1	5	3	+2	11	
3	Chinese Taipei	6	1	1	4	4	13	−9	4	
4	Bangladesh	6	1	0	5	4	14	−10	3	

Source: RSSSF
(H) Hosts
16 March 1997
19:45 UTC+08:00

Saudi Arabia	2–0	Chinese Taipei
O. Al-Dosari 34'; Al-Shahrani 37'	Report

Shah Alam Stadium, Shah Alam
Attendance: 15,000
Referee: Hiroyuki Umemoto (Japan)
16 March 1997
21:45 UTC+08:00

Bangladesh	0–2	Malaysia
	Report	Azman 43'; Abdul Karim 87'

Shah Alam Stadium, Shah Alam
Attendance: 30,000
Referee: Wei Jihong (China)

18 March 1997
19:45 UTC+08:00

Malaysia	0–0	Saudi Arabia
	Report

Shah Alam Stadium, Shah Alam
Attendance: 20,000
Referee: Hiroyuki Umemoto (Japan)
18 March 1997
21:45 UTC+08:00

Chinese Taipei	3–1	Bangladesh
Lin Wen-han 59'; Huang Che-ming 62'; Chen Kuei-jen 78'	Report	Jewel 56'

Shah Alam Stadium, Shah Alam
Attendance: 25,000
Referee: Hameed Al-Hindyani (Kuwait)

20 March 1997
19:45 UTC+08:00

Saudi Arabia	4–1	Bangladesh
Al-Muwallid 20'; Al-Temawi 27'; Al-Shahrani 65'; Al-Mehallel 73'	Report	Jewel 44'

Shah Alam Stadium, Shah Alam
Attendance: 12,000
Referee: Fong Fat Wah (Hong Kong)
20 March 1997
21:45 UTC+08:00

Chinese Taipei	0–2	Malaysia
	Report	Che Zambil 2'; Sulong 16'

Shah Alam Stadium, Shah Alam
Referee: Ahmed Ibrahim Hakeem (United Arab Emirates)

27 March 1997
18:30 UTC+03:00

Malaysia	0–0	Chinese Taipei
	Report

Youth Welfare, Jeddah
Attendance: 20,000
Referee: Mohamed Bin Khamis Al Kabi (Oman)
27 March 1997
20:30 UTC+03:00

Bangladesh	0–3	Saudi Arabia
	Report	Ibrahim Suwayed 3'; O. Al-Dosari 45'; Abdullah Al-Dosari 79'

Youth Welfare, Jeddah
Attendance: 20,000
Referee: Ahmad Nabil Ayad (Libanon)

29 March 1997
18:30 UTC+03:00

Saudi Arabia	3–0	Malaysia
Al-Muwallid 59', 85'; O. Al-Dosari 87'	Report

Youth Welfare, Jeddah
Attendance: 15,000
Referee: Pirom Un-Prasert (Thailand)
29 March 1997
20:30 UTC+03:00

Bangladesh	2–1	Chinese Taipei
Alfaz 45'; Nakib 81'	Report	Hsu Te-ming 51'

Youth Welfare, Jeddah
Attendance: 2,000
Referee: Omar Abu Loom (Jordan)

31 March 1997
18:30 UTC+03:00

Malaysia	1–0	Bangladesh
Zainal 32'	Report

Youth Welfare, Jeddah
Attendance: 6,000
Referee: Pirom Un-Prasert (Thailand)
31 March 1997
20:30 UTC+03:00

Chinese Taipei	0–6	Saudi Arabia
	Report	Al-Jaber 3', 16', 63'; Al-Muwallid 5'; Abdulaziz Al-Dosari 30'; Al-Zahrani 46'

Youth Welfare, Jeddah
Attendance: 9,000
Referee: Kim Young-Joo (South Korea)

== Group 2 ==
Pos	Team	Pld	W	D	L	GF	GA	GD	Pts	Qualification
1	Iran	6	5	1	0	39	3	+36	16	Final round
2	Syria	6	3	1	2	30	5	+25	10	
3	Kyrgyzstan	6	3	0	3	12	14	−2	9	
4	Maldives	6	0	0	6	0	59	−59	0	

Source: RSSSF
2 June 1997
16:30 UTC+3

Maldives	0–17	Iran
	Report	Bagheri 9', 13', 16', 60', 66', 67', 86'; Estili 29', 47', 55'; Azizi 35', 36'; Shahroudi 56'; Mahdavikia 63'; Daei 75', 77'; Minavand 87'

Abbasiyyin Stadium, Damascus
Attendance: 7,000
Referee: An Bong-Ki (South Korea)

Note: This match broke the score difference record in FIFA A-level matches, while the previous record was created by Denmark in the 1908 Summer Olympics against France by 17–1.

2 June 1997

Syria	3–0 Awarded (Note: FIFA awarded Syria a 3–0 win as a result of Kyrgyzstan being late on the pitch.)	Kyrgyzstan

Abbasiyyin Stadium, Damascus

4 June 1997

Syria	12–0	Maldives
Al-Said 7', 13'; Jokhadar 9', 37', 89'; Rifai 10'; Jabban 12', 78'; Srour 21'; Zaher 49'; Boshi 70', 79'	Report

Abbasiyyin Stadium, Damascus
Attendance: 15,000
Referee: Esa Mohamed Saleh (United Arab Emirates)
4 June 1997
15:30 UTC+3

Kyrgyzstan	0–7	Iran
	Report	Bagheri 35', 51'; Daei 57'; Majidi 68', 88'; Minavand 76'; Mousavi 82'

Abbasiyyin Stadium, Damascus
Attendance: 8,000
Referee: Shamsul Maidin (Singapore)

6 June 1997
17:30 UTC+3

Syria	0–1	Iran
	Report	Daei 65'

Abbasiyyin Stadium, Damascus
Attendance: 33,000
Referee: Masayoshi Okada (Japan)
6 June 1997

Kyrgyzstan	3–0	Maldives
Korzanov 4'; Merzlikin 24'; Yusupov 28'	Report

Abbasiyyin Stadium, Damascus
Attendance: 7,000
Referee: Wang Xuezhi (China)

9 June 1997
19:00

Iran	3–1	Kyrgyzstan
Azizi 3', 77'; Bagheri 52'	Report	Kutsov 16'

Azadi Stadium, Tehran
Attendance: 50,000
Referee: Pirom Un-Prasert (Thailand)
9 June 1997

Maldives	0–12	Syria
	Report	Agha 24', 50'; Dib 55'; Taleb 60'; Al-Said 62', 63', 87'; Rihawi 66'; Abrash 80', 90'; Zaher 85', 89'

Azadi Stadium, Tehran
Attendance: 25,000
Referee: Mohamed Nazri Abdullah (Malaysia)

11 June 1997
19:00

Iran	9–0	Maldives
Mansourian 15', 44'; Bagheri 22', 39'; Daei 33', 43'; Mahdavikia 38'; Shahroudi 68'; Azizi 87'	Report

Azadi Stadium, Tehran
Attendance: 30,000
Referee: Mohamed Sanhoub (Yemen)
11 June 1997

Kyrgyzstan	2–1	Syria
Sardarov 76'; Kutsov 89'	Report	Boshi 84'

Azadi Stadium, Tehran
Attendance: 15,000
Referee: Yu Jingyin (China)

13 June 1997

Iran	2–2	Syria
Shahroudi 10'; Mansourian 30'	Report	Boshi 11'; Al-Said 39'

Azadi Stadium, Tehran
Attendance: 100,000
Referee: Mohamed Nazri Abdullah (Malaysia)
13 June 1997

Maldives	0–6	Kyrgyzstan
	Report	Merzlikin 14'; Chertkov 22'; Kutsov 26'; Haitbaev 47', 89'; Ivanov 47'

Azadi Stadium, Tehran
Attendance: 70,000
Referee: Fahed Al-Damisi (Jordan)

== Group 3 ==
Pos	Team	Pld	W	D	L	GF	GA	GD	Pts	Qualification
1	United Arab Emirates	4	3	1	0	7	1	+6	10	Final round
2	Jordan	4	1	1	2	4	4	0	4	
3	Bahrain	4	1	0	3	3	9	−6	3	

Source: RSSSF
8 April 1997

Jordan	0–0	United Arab Emirates
	Report

Bahrain National Stadium, Riffa
Attendance: 3,000
Referee: Omer Al Mehannah (Saudi Arabia)

11 April 1997

Bahrain	1–2	United Arab Emirates
Darwish 84'	Report	Abdulla 18', 57'

Bahrain National Stadium, Riffa
Attendance: 18,000
Referee: Lu Jun (China)

14 April 1997

Bahrain	1–0	Jordan
Al-Doseri 27'	Report

Bahrain National Stadium, Riffa
Attendance: 4,000
Referee: Eskandar Hammal (Syria)

19 April 1997

Jordan	4–1	Bahrain
Tadrus 14', 89'; Al-Sheikh 33'; Al-Khatib 88'	Report	Rashed 43'

Sports Stadium, Sharjah
Attendance: 4,000
Referee: Menfi Redha Falah (Iraq)

22 April 1997

United Arab Emirates	3–0	Bahrain
Saeed 14'; Mubarak 50', 60'	Report

Sports Stadium, Sharjah
Attendance: 12,000
Referee: Kiyoshi Ota (Japan)

26 April 1997

United Arab Emirates	2–0	Jordan
Al Talyani 27'; Mubarak 88'	Report

Sports Stadium, Sharjah
Attendance: 12,000
Referee: Hossein Asgari (Iran)

== Group 4 ==
Pos	Team	Pld	W	D	L	GF	GA	GD	Pts	Qualification
1	Japan	6	5	1	0	31	1	+30	16	Final round
2	Oman	6	4	1	1	14	2	+12	13	
3	Macau	6	1	1	4	3	28	−25	4	
4	Nepal	6	0	1	5	2	19	−17	1	

Source: RSSSF
23 March 1997
18:40 UTC+4

Oman	0–1	Japan
	Report	Omura 10'

Sultan Qaboos Sports Complex, Muscat
Attendance: 2,000
Referee: Nik Ahmad Haji Yaakub (Malaysia)
23 March 1997
23:03 UTC+4

Nepal	1–1	Macau
Khadka 23'	Report	Cheng 13'

Sultan Qaboos Sports Complex, Muscat
Attendance: 500
Referee: Mahmoud Nurilddin (Iraq)

25 March 1997
16:30 UTC+4

Macau	0–10	Japan
	Report	Akita 1'; Takagi 14', 33', 72'; Soma 45'; Miura 54', 89'; Moroshima 80', 82'; Nanami 86'

Sultan Qaboos Sports Complex, Muscat
Attendance: 600
Referee: Wang Xuezhi (China)
25 March 1997
18:40 UTC+4

Oman	1–0	Nepal
Al Busaidy 75'	Report

Sultan Qaboos Sports Complex, Muscat
Attendance: 1,000
Referee: Yousef Shaikho (Syria)

27 March 1997
16:30 UTC+4

Nepal	0–6	Japan
	Report	Morishima 24'; Takagi 47', 55', 89'; Omura 76'; Honda 90'

Sultan Qaboos Sports Complex, Muscat
Attendance: 500
Referee: Sardar Nadjafaliev (Uzbekistan)
27 March 1997
18:40 UTC+4

Oman	4–0	Macau
Samir 32'; Al Siyabi 42', 56'; Abdul Noor 83'	Report

Sultan Qaboos Sports Complex, Muscat
Attendance: 0
Referee: Mahmoud Nurilddin (Iraq)

22 June 1997

Japan	10–0	Macau
Nakata 17', 61'; Nishizawa 21'; Miura 23', 29', 44', 57', 62', 79'; Nanami 42'	Report

Tokyo Olympic Stadium, Tokyo
Attendance: 27,342
Referee: Ali Naghi Mostafanezhad (Iran)
22 June 1997

Nepal	0–6	Oman
	Report	Shakya 1' (o.g.); Al Busaidy 13'; Ahmed Hassan 17', 50'; Al Araimi 73'; Al Masori 78'

Tokyo Olympic Stadium, Tokyo
Attendance: 15,875
Referee: Sun Baojie (China)

25 June 1997

Japan	3–0	Nepal
Nishizawa 44'; Miura 72', 87'	Report

Tokyo Olympic Stadium, Tokyo
Attendance: 28,360
Referee: Abayawansa Mahasena Yapa (Sri Lanka)
25 June 1997

Macau	0–2	Oman
	Report	Al Araimi 44'; Ahmed Hassan 89'

Tokyo Olympic Stadium, Tokyo
Attendance: 8,737
Referee: Mahmoud Al Rifaee (Syria)

28 June 1997

Japan	1–1	Oman
Nakata 4'	Report	Samir 63'

Tokyo Olympic Stadium, Tokyo
Attendance: 48,839
Referee: Selearajen Subramaniam (Malaysia)
28 June 1997

Macau	2–1	Nepal
Che 78'; Da Cruz Martins 89'	Report	Deepak Amatya 19'

Tokyo Olympic Stadium, Tokyo
Attendance: 22,972

== Group 5 ==
Pos	Team	Pld	W	D	L	GF	GA	GD	Pts	Qualification
1	Uzbekistan	6	5	1	0	20	3	+17	16	Final round
2	Yemen	6	2	2	2	10	7	+3	8	
3	Indonesia	6	1	4	1	11	6	+5	7	
4	Cambodia	6	0	1	5	2	27	−25	1	

Source: RSSSF
6 April 1997

Indonesia	8–0	Cambodia
Putro 1'; Lubis 6', 52'; Putiray 12', 44', 70'; Wabia 31', 36'	Report

Senayan Stadium, Jakarta
Attendance: 25,000
Referee: Shamsul Maidin (Singapore)

13 April 1997

Indonesia	0–0	Yemen
	Report

Senayan Stadium, Jakarta
Attendance: 25,000
Referee: Selearajen Subramaniam (Malaysia)

20 April 1997

Cambodia	0–1	Yemen
	Report	Dariban 39'

Olympic Stadium, Phnom Penh
Attendance: 20,000
Referee: Ng Yim Kin (Hong Kong)

27 April 1997

Cambodia	1–1	Indonesia
Sochetra 65'	Report	Putro 80'

Olympic Stadium, Phnom Penh
Attendance: 30,000
Referee: Li Haiseng (China)

9 May 1997

Yemen	0–1	Uzbekistan
	Report	Khasanov 27'

Althawra Sports City Stadium, Sana'a
Attendance: 28,000
Referee: Yousef Sawarkeh (Jordan)

16 May 1997

Yemen	7–0	Cambodia
Al Ariki 4', 13', 15', 83'; Noman 50'; Bashafal 55'; Abdulla 65'	Report

Althawra Sports City Stadium, Sana'a
Attendance: 40,000
Referee: Khaled Dalu (Syria)

25 May 1997

Uzbekistan	6–0	Cambodia
Shirshov 8'; Khasanov 18'; Lebedev 38', 73'; Fedorov 45'; Irismetov 55'	Report

Pakhtakor Markaziy Stadium, Tashkent
Attendance: 53,000
Referee: Viktor Kolpakov (Kyrgyzstan)

1 June 1997

Indonesia	1–1	Uzbekistan
Sudirman 34'	Report	Shatskikh 74'

Senayan Stadium, Jakarta
Attendance: 30,000
Referee: Kim Kwang-Jong (South Korea)

13 June 1997

Yemen	1–1	Indonesia
Al Ariki 33'	Report	Putro 59'

Althawra Sports City Stadium, Sana'a
Attendance: 35,000
Referee: Ali Al Hosni Ali Bin Mubarak (Oman)

20 June 1997

Uzbekistan	3–0	Indonesia
Shatskikh 12'; Maksudov 37', 87'	Report

Pakhtakor Markaziy Stadium, Tashkent
Attendance: 55,000
Referee: Jalal Moradi (Iran)

29 June 1997

Cambodia	1–4	Uzbekistan
Sochetra 12'	Report	Abdukahhor Marifaliev 2', 60'; Ravshan Bozorov 9', 30'

Olympic Stadium, Phnom Penh
Attendance: 12,000
Referee: Abdul Shakoor Baloch (Pakistan)

24 August 1997

Uzbekistan	5–1	Yemen
Shkvirin 8', 63'; Shatskikh 55', 75'; Bazarov 62'	Report	Zughair 30'

Pakhtakor Markaziy Stadium, Tashkent
Attendance: 20,000
Referee: Sultan Mujalli Al Aalaq (Bahrain)

== Group 6 ==
Pos	Team	Pld	W	D	L	GF	GA	GD	Pts	Qualification
1	South Korea	4	3	1	0	9	1	+8	10	Final round
2	Thailand	4	1	1	2	5	6	−1	4	
3	Hong Kong	4	1	0	3	3	10	−7	3	

Source: RSSSF
22 February 1997

Hong Kong	0–2	South Korea
	Report	Seo Jung-won 60'; Choi Moon-sik 75'

Hong Kong
Referee: Yoshimi Ogawa (Japan)

2 March 1997

Thailand	1–3	South Korea
Piyapong 48'	Report	Roh Sang-rae 18'; Ha Seok-ju 74'; Choi Moon-sik 86'

Rajamangala Stadium, Bangkok
Attendance: 20,000
Referee: Lu Jun (China)

9 March 1997

Thailand	2–0	Hong Kong
Krissada 23'; Natipong 79'	Report

Rajamangala Stadium, Bangkok
Attendance: 10,000
Referee: Abdul Aziz A. Al Dokhail (Saudi Arabia)

30 March 1997

Hong Kong	3–2	Thailand
Lee Kin Wo 23'; Cheng Siu Chung 48'; Au Wai Lun 88'	Report	Natipong 43'; Chalermsan 70'

Hong Kong
Attendance: 20,000
Referee: Nazri Abdullah Mohamed (Malaysia)

28 May 1997

South Korea	4–0	Hong Kong
Yoo Sang-chul 25'; Choi Yong-soo 39', 72'; Park Kun-ha 86'	Report

Daejeon Hanbat Sports Complex, Daejeon
Attendance: 20,000
Referee: Hussein Issa (Iraq)

1 June 1997

South Korea	0–0	Thailand
	Report

Seoul Olympic Stadium, Seoul
Attendance: 20,000
Referee: Jamal Al Sharif (Syria)

== Group 7 ==
Pos	Team	Pld	W	D	L	GF	GA	GD	Pts	Qualification
1	Kuwait	4	4	0	0	10	1	+9	12	Final round
2	Lebanon	4	1	1	2	4	7	−3	4	
3	Singapore	4	0	1	3	2	8	−6	1	

Source: RSSSF
13 April 1997

Lebanon	1–1	Singapore
Nazha 49'	Report	Zainal 88'

Bourj Hammoud Stadium, Beirut
Attendance: 12,000
Referee: Abdul Rahman Al-Zaid (Saudi Arabia)

26 April 1997

Singapore	0–1	Kuwait
	Report	Al Saqer 29'

National Stadium, Singapore
Attendance: 13,000
Referee: Park Hae-Yong (South Korea)

8 May 1997

Kuwait	2–0	Lebanon
Al Huwaidi 38'; Al Ahmad 79'	Report

Kuwait City
Attendance: 12,000
Referee: Ali Bujsaim (United Arab Emirates)

24 May 1997

Singapore	1–2	Lebanon
Steven Tan 58' (pen.)	Report	Shehab 35'; Melikian 80'

National Stadium, Singapore
Attendance: 14,455
Referee: Pirom Un-Prasert (Thailand)

5 June 1997

Kuwait	4–0	Singapore
Wabran 28'; Al Ahmad 35'; Al Huwaidi 43'; Abdullah 78'	Report

Kuwait City
Attendance: 13,000
Referee: Suleman Abo Allo (Syria)

22 June 1997

Lebanon	1–3	Kuwait
Shehab 29'	Report	Otaibi 7'; Al Saleh 32'; Hussain 74'

Bourj Hammoud Stadium, Beirut
Attendance: 2,500
Referee: Masayoshi Okada (Japan)

== Group 8 ==
Pos	Team	Pld	W	D	L	GF	GA	GD	Pts	Qualification
1	China	6	5	1	0	13	2	+11	16	Final round
2	Tajikistan	6	4	1	1	15	2	+13	13	
3	Turkmenistan	6	2	0	4	8	13	−5	6	
4	Vietnam	6	0	0	6	2	21	−19	0	

Source: RSSSF
4 May 1997

Tajikistan	4–0	Vietnam
Alidodov 8'; Muminov 15'; Dzhaborov 50', 84'	Report

Pamir Stadium, Dushanbe
Attendance: 18,000
Referee: Alexander Koulakov (Kazakhstan)
4 May 1997

Turkmenistan	1–4	China
Meredov 90'	Report	Peng Weiguo 26', 39'; Gao Feng 78'; Li Bing 80'

Nisa-Çandybil Stadium, Ashgabat
Attendance: 3,000
Referee: Saeed Abdulla Ibrahim (United Arab Emirates)

11 May 1997

Tajikistan	0–1	China
	Report	Hao Haidong 65'

Pamir Stadium, Dushanbe
Attendance: 19,000
Referee: Masoud Kaabi (Iran)
11 May 1997

Turkmenistan	2–1	Vietnam
Agabaev 39'; Gulyan 53'	Report	Nguyen Cong Vinh 71'

Nisa-Çandybil Stadium, Ashgabat
Attendance: 2,500
Referee: Gyanu Shrestha (Nepal)

25 May 1997

Vietnam	1–3	China
Le Huynh Duc 38'	Report	Li Bing 23'; Fan Zhiyi 32'; Hao Haidong 44'

Thong Nhat Stadium, Ho Chi Minh City
Attendance: 23,000
Referee: Russamee Jindamai (Thailand)
25 May 1997

Turkmenistan	1–2	Tajikistan
Tkavadze 18'	Report	Knizaev 41', 49'

Nisa-Çandybil Stadium, Ashgabat
Attendance: 3,000
Referee: Inayath Ulla Khan (India)

1 June 1997

China	1–0	Turkmenistan
Li Jinyu 81'	Report

Workers Stadium, Beijing
Attendance: 20,000
Referee: Yoshimi Ogawa (Japan)
1 June 1997

Vietnam	0–4	Tajikistan
	Report	Muminov 5'; Alidodov 24'; Avakov 67'; Achourmamadov 75'

Thong Nhat Stadium, Ho Chi Minh City
Attendance: 10,000
Referee: Ngadiman Asri (Indonesia)

8 June 1997

China	0–0	Tajikistan
	Report

Workers Stadium, Beijing
Attendance: 21,000
Referee: Abdul Khudheir Abdul Hussein (Iraq)
8 June 1997

Vietnam	0–4	Turkmenistan
	Report	Agaev 16', 57', 63'; Broshin 20'

Thong Nhat Stadium, Ho Chi Minh City
Attendance: 5,000
Referee: Kyaw U Kyaw (Myanmar)

22 June 1997

China	4–0	Vietnam
Fan Zhiyi 7'; Hao Haidong 45'; Ma Mingyu 65'; Su Maozhen 70'	Report

Workers Stadium, Beijing
Attendance: 15,000
Referee: Jang Sok Jin (North Korea)
22 June 1997

Tajikistan	5–0	Turkmenistan
Avakov 4', 26', 34'; Dzhaborov 14'; Muminov 88'	Report

Pamir Stadium, Dushanbe
Attendance: 7,000
Referee: Nail Lutfullin (Uzbekistan)

== Group 9 ==
Pos	Team	Pld	W	D	L	GF	GA	GD	Pts	Qualification
1	Kazakhstan	4	4	0	0	15	2	+13	12	Final round
2	Iraq	4	2	0	2	14	8	+6	6	
3	Pakistan	4	0	0	4	3	22	−19	0	

Source: RSSSF
11 May 1997

Kazakhstan	3–0	Pakistan
Yesmagambetov 2', 62'; Yablochkin 49'	Report

Central Stadium, Almaty
Attendance: 12,000
Referee: Allabergen Sapaev (Turkmenistan)

23 May 1997

Pakistan	2–6	Iraq
Umar 8'; Rafiq 53'	Report	Fawzi 1', 62'; Chathir 35', 61'; Hussein 52'; Radhi 70'

Railway Stadium, Lahore
Attendance: 12,000
Referee: Sunil Senaweera (Sri Lanka)

6 June 1997

Iraq	1–2	Kazakhstan
Saadoun 2'	Report	Klishin 41'; Loginov 48'

Al-Shaab Stadium, Baghdad
Attendance: 20,000
Referee: Wei Jihong (China)

11 June 1997

Pakistan	0–7	Kazakhstan
	Report	Yesmagambetov 28'; Klishin 32'; Loginov 36'; Mazbayev 53'; Zubarev 64', 68', 72'

Railway Stadium, Lahore
Attendance: 3,500
Referee: Abbas Al Dashti Essa (Kuwait)

20 June 1997

Iraq	6–1	Pakistan
Hussein 11', 26'; Fawzi 69', 76'; Abbas 71', 89'	Report	Umar 58'

Al-Shaab Stadium, Baghdad
Referee: Ammar Ammar (Lebanon)

29 June 1997

Kazakhstan	3–1	Iraq
Mazbayev 4'; Loginov 36'; Saadoun 56' (o.g.)	Report	Abdullah 1'

Central Stadium, Almaty
Attendance: 12,000
Referee: Jindamai Russamee (Thailand)

== Group 10 ==
Pos	Team	Pld	W	D	L	GF	GA	GD	Pts	Qualification
1	Qatar	3	3	0	0	14	0	+14	9	Final round
2	Sri Lanka	3	1	1	1	4	4	0	4	
3	India	3	1	1	1	3	7	−4	4	
4	Philippines	3	0	0	3	0	10	−10	0	

Source: RSSSF
20 September 1996
18:15

Qatar	3–0	Sri Lanka
Soufi 35'; Al-Enazi 51'; Mustafa 81'	Report

Khalifa International Stadium, Doha
Attendance: 1,000
Referee: Kurmanbek Ordabayev (Kazakhstan)
21 September 1996
18:15

India	2–0	Philippines
Vijayan 81'; Coutinho 85'	Report

Khalifa International Stadium, Doha
Attendance: 700
Referee: Omar Ali Al Shughair (Saudi Arabia)

23 September 1996
18:15

Qatar	5–0	Philippines
Al-Enazi 19', 41'; Soufi 29'; Khamis 30'; Jaloof 38'	Report

Khalifa International Stadium, Doha
Attendance: 800
Referee: Muhammad Sahib (Iraq)
24 September 1996
18:15

Sri Lanka	1–1	India
Silva 14'	Report	Chapman 39'

Khalifa International Stadium, Doha
Attendance: 400
Referee: Ammar Ammar (Lebanon)

26 September 1996
18:15

Philippines	0–3	Sri Lanka
	Report	Steinwall 28'; Perera 55', 80'

Khalifa International Stadium, Doha
Attendance: 200
Referee: Kurmanbek Ordabayev (Kazakhstan)
27 September 1996
18:15

Qatar	6–0	India
Al-Enazi 27', 40'; Al Kuwari 42'; Maayof 47'; Soufi 52'; Mustafa 61'	Report

Khalifa International Stadium, Doha
Attendance: 3,000
Referee: Omar Ali Al Shughair (Saudi Arabia)
