= Football at the 1998 Asian Games – Men's tournament =

1998 Asian Games event

Men's football at the 1994 Asian Games
- Date: 30 November – 19 December
- Nations: 23

Medalists
gold medal	Iran
silver medal	Kuwait
bronze medal	China

Football was contested as part of the programme for the 1998 Asian Games which was hosted in Bangkok, Thailand from 6 to 20 December 1998. It was the 13th edition of the men's football tournament at the multi-sport event organised by the Olympic Council of Asia.

The men's football tournament began with the first matches of the first group stage on 30 November 1998 and ended with the gold medal match on 19 December 1998. Iran and Kuwait contested the final. Goals from Ali Karimi and Karim Bagheri helped Iran defeat Kuwait 2–0 to win the gold medal. In the bronze medal match, China defeated Thailand 3–0.

== Background ==
Football had been part of the Asian Games programme following the debut of the men's competition at the inaugural 1951 Asian Games in India.

South Korea held the record for gold medals having won the football tournament three times. However, they had only won the gold medal outright once after twice sharing the title. India, Iran and Taiwan had each won the gold medal outright twice. Uzbekistan were the defending champions after defeating China 4–2 in the final at the 1994 Asian Games in Japan.

== Format ==
In total, 24 teams took part in the competition. They were drawn into eight single round robin groups of three teams. The group winners and runners-up were then drawn into four single round robin groups of four teams. The group winners and runners-up would then contest the quarter-finals. The winners of the quarter-finals would contest the semi-finals which would decide which teams contested the gold and bronze medal matches.

=== Participants ===
- ~~Brunei~~
- Cambodia
- China
- Hong Kong
- India
- Iran
- Japan
- Kazakhstan
- Kuwait
- Laos
- Lebanon
- Maldives
- Mongolia
- Nepal
- Oman
- North Korea
- Qatar
- South Korea
- Tajikistan
- Thailand
- Turkmenistan
- United Arab Emirates
- Uzbekistan
- Vietnam

== Venues ==
Matches were played at nine venues across Thailand including the Rajamangala Stadium and the Supachalasai Stadium in Bangkok, the 700th Anniversary Stadium in Chiang Mai, the Suphanburi Stadium in Suphanburi, the Tinsulanon Stadium in Songkhla, the Nakhon Sawan Stadium in Nakhon Sawan, the Sri Nakhon Lamduan Stadium in Sisaket, the Surat Thani Stadium in Surat Thani and the Trang Municipality Stadium in Trang.

Bangkok		Chiang Mai	Suphanburi	Songkhla
Rajamangala Stadium	Supachalasai Stadium	700th Anniversary Stadium	Suphanburi Stadium	Tinsulanon Stadium
Capacity: 80,000	Capacity: 40,000	Capacity: 25,000	Capacity: 20,000	Capacity: 20,000
Nakhon Sawan	Sisaket	Surat Thani	Trang	
Nakhon Sawan Stadium	Sri Nakhon Lamduan Stadium	Surat Thani Stadium	Trang Municipality Stadium	
Capacity: 15,000	Capacity: 11,200	Capacity: 10,000	Capacity: 4,789	
Football at the 1998 Asian Games – Men's tournament is located in Thailand

== First group stage ==
=== Group A ===
Turkmenistan and South Korea advanced to the second group stage.

==== Table ====
Pos	Team	Pld	W	D	L	GF	GA	GD	Pts	Qualification
1	Turkmenistan	2	2	0	0	5	2	+3	6	Qualification for the second group stage
2	South Korea	2	1	0	1	6	3	+3	3	Qualification for the second group stage
3	Vietnam	2	0	0	2	0	6	−6	0	

==== Matches ====
30 November 1998
15:30

Turkmenistan	2–0	Vietnam
Zawýalow 6'; Bondarenko 23'

Nakhon Sawan Stadium, Nakhon Sawan

2 December 1998
15:30

South Korea	2–3	Turkmenistan
Choi Yong-soo 2', 45'		Kislow 60', 90'; Agaýew 86'

Nakhon Sawan Stadium, Nakhon Sawan

4 December 1998
15:30

Vietnam	0–4	South Korea
		Kim Eun-jung 30'; Choi Yong-soo 43', 87'; Yoon Jong-hwan 67'

Nakhon Sawan Stadium, Nakhon Sawan

=== Group B ===
China and Lebanon advanced to the second group stage.

==== Table ====
Pos	Team	Pld	W	D	L	GF	GA	GD	Pts	Qualification
1	China	2	2	0	0	8	2	+6	6	Qualification for the second group stage
2	Lebanon	2	1	0	1	6	5	+1	3	Qualification for the second group stage
3	Cambodia	2	0	0	2	2	9	−7	0	

==== Matches ====
30 November 1998
15:30

China	4–1	Lebanon
Fan Zhiyi 21'; Ma Mingyu 43'; Li Jinyu 80'; Wang Peng 89'		Taha 61'

Surat Thani Stadium, Surat Thani

2 December 1998
15:30

Cambodia	1–4	China
Hok Sochetra 81'		Yang Chen 17', 77', 82'; Wang Peng 21'

Surat Thani Stadium, Surat Thani

4 December 1998
15:30

Lebanon	5–1	Cambodia
Taha 34', 80'; Chahrour 36'; Al-Indari 45'; Hojeij 55'		Nuth Sony 70'

Surat Thani Stadium, Surat Thani

=== Group C ===
Japan and India advanced to the second group stage.

==== Table ====
Pos	Team	Pld	W	D	L	GF	GA	GD	Pts	Qualification
1	Japan	2	2	0	0	6	0	+6	6	Qualification for the second group stage
2	India	2	1	0	1	1	1	0	3	Qualification for the second group stage
3	Nepal	2	0	0	2	0	6	−6	0	

==== Matches ====
1 December 1998
15:30

Nepal	0–5	Japan
		Fukuda 10', 11'; Ono 30'; Inamoto 60', 89'

Trang Stadium, Trang

3 December 1998
15:30

Japan	1–0	India
Fukuda 55'

Trang Stadium, Trang

5 December 1998
15:30

India	1–0	Nepal
Chapman 46'

Trang Stadium, Trang

=== Group D ===
Qatar and Tajikistan advanced to the second group stage.

==== Table ====
Pos	Team	Pld	W	D	L	GF	GA	GD	Pts	Qualification
1	Qatar	2	2	0	0	6	1	+5	6	Qualification for the second group stage
2	Tajikistan	2	1	0	1	4	2	+2	3	Qualification for the second group stage
3	Maldives	2	0	0	2	0	7	−7	0	

==== Matches ====
1 December 1998
15:30

Tajikistan	3–0	Maldives
Muminov 21'; Berdikulov 65'; Saltsman 69'

Suphan Buri Stadium, Suphan Buri

3 December 1998
15:30

Qatar	2–1	Tajikistan
Al-Obaidly 31'; Mustafa 51'		Jabborov 90' (pen.)

Suphan Buri Stadium, Suphan Buri

5 December 1998
15:30

Maldives	0–4	Qatar
		Al-Kuwari 21', 41', 61', 68'

Suphan Buri Stadium, Suphan Buri

=== Group E ===
Brunei were drawn into Group E but withdrew before the competition began. The United Arab Emirates and North Korea advanced to the second group stage.

==== Table ====
Pos	Team	Pld	W	D	L	GF	GA	GD	Pts	Qualification
1	United Arab Emirates	1	0	1	0	3	3	0	1	Qualification for the second group stage
2	North Korea	1	0	1	0	3	3	0	1	Qualification for the second group stage

==== Matches ====
2 December 1998
15:30

United Arab Emirates	3–3	North Korea
Matar 20'; Mohamed 31', 39'		Kang Sun-il 62'; Ri Chang-ha 82'; Jon Yong-chol 89'
Penalties
	4–1

Tinsulanon Stadium, Songkhla

=== Group F ===
Thailand and Oman advanced to the second group stage.

==== Table ====
Pos	Team	Pld	W	D	L	GF	GA	GD	Pts	Qualification
1	Thailand	2	2	0	0	7	0	+7	6	Qualification for the second group stage
2	Oman	2	1	0	1	6	2	+4	3	Qualification for the second group stage
3	Hong Kong	2	0	0	2	0	11	−11	0	

==== Matches ====
30 November 1998
15:30

Hong Kong	0–6	Oman
		Khadim 16'; Shaaban 44'; Al-Dhabit 74', 80', 90+1'; Masoud 75'

Supachalasai Stadium, Bangkok

2 December 1998
18:30

Thailand	5–0	Hong Kong
Piandit 1'; Srimaka 8'; Senamuang 22', 86'; Sripan 53'

Supachalasai Stadium, Bangkok

4 December 1998
15:30

Oman	0–2	Thailand
		Srimaka 17'; Damrong-ongtrakul 38'

Supachalasai Stadium, Bangkok

=== Group G ===
Uzbekistan and Kuwait advanced to the second group stage.

==== Table ====
Pos	Team	Pld	W	D	L	GF	GA	GD	Pts	Qualification
1	Uzbekistan	2	1	1	0	18	3	+15	4	Qualification for the second group stage
2	Kuwait	2	1	1	0	14	3	+11	4	Qualification for the second group stage
3	Mongolia	2	0	0	2	0	26	−26	0	

==== Matches ====
1 December 1998
15:30

Mongolia	0–11	Kuwait
		Mubarak 3'; Laheeb 15', 19', 26', 88'; Al-Huwaidi 37', 61', 85' (pen.), 90'; Al-Mutairi 29'; Al-Saqer 39'

700th Anniversary Stadium, Chiang Mai

3 December 1998
15:30

Uzbekistan	3–3	Kuwait
Fyodorov 4'; Khvostunov 67'; Akopyants 76'		Al-Huwaidi 43'; Laheeb 78', 90'

700th Anniversary Stadium, Chiang Mai

5 December 1998
15:30

Mongolia	0–15	Uzbekistan
		Lebedev 7' (pen.), 18' (pen.), 38', 45'; Shkvyrin 9', 15', 20'; Akopyants 23'; Quttiboev 29', 33', 47'; Qosimov 53', 57', 77'; Rahmonqulov 83'

700th Anniversary Stadium, Chiang Mai

=== Group H ===
Iran and Kazakhstan advanced to the second group stage.

==== Table ====
Pos	Team	Pld	W	D	L	GF	GA	GD	Pts	Qualification
1	Iran	2	2	0	0	8	1	+7	6	Qualification for the second group stage
2	Kazakhstan	2	1	0	1	5	2	+3	3	Qualification for the second group stage
3	Laos	2	0	0	2	1	11	−10	0	

==== Matches ====
1 December 1998
15:30

Kazakhstan	0–2	Iran
		Hashemian 1', 55'

Sri Nakhon Lamduan Stadium, Sisaket

3 December 1998
15:30

Laos	0–5	Kazakhstan
		Makayev 32'; Niyazymbetov 40'; Zubarev 53', 56', 88'

Sri Nakhon Lamduan Stadium, Sisaket

5 December 1998
15:30

Iran	6–1	Laos
Mousavi 25', 33'; Mansourian 73'; Yazdani 81'; Daei 82'; Douangdala 86' (o.g.)		Keophet 45'

Sri Nakhon Lamduan Stadium, Sisaket

== Second group stage ==
=== Group I ===
Uzbekistan and Turkmenistan advanced to the quarter-finals.

==== Table ====
Pos	Team	Pld	W	D	L	GF	GA	GD	Pts	Qualification
1	Uzbekistan	3	2	1	0	7	1	+6	7	Qualification for the quarter-finals
2	Turkmenistan	3	1	2	0	5	4	+1	5	Qualification for the quarter-finals
3	North Korea	3	1	1	1	3	5	−2	4	
4	India	3	0	0	3	2	7	−5	0	

==== Matches ====
7 December 1998
15:00

Turkmenistan	3–2	India
Neželew 39'; Agaýew 49'; Kislow 74'		Vijayan 83'; Rakshit 87'

Supachalasai Stadium, Bangkok
7 December 1998
17:00

North Korea	0–4	Uzbekistan
		Shirshov 16', 75'; Shkvyrin 60'; Akopyants 66'

Supachalasai Stadium, Bangkok

9 December 1998
15:00

North Korea	1–1	Turkmenistan
Ri Chang-ha 70'		Bondarenko 89'

Supachalasai Stadium, Bangkok
9 December 1998
17:00

India	0–2	Uzbekistan
		Shkvyrin 35'; Rahmonqulov 49'

Supachalasai Stadium, Bangkok

11 December 1998
15:00

India	0–2	North Korea
		So Min-chol 11'; Ju Song-il 73'

Supachalasai Stadium, Bangkok
11 December 1998
17:00

Uzbekistan	1–1	Turkmenistan
Quttiboev 37'		Agabaýew 72'

Supachalasai Stadium, Bangkok

=== Group J ===
South Korea and Kuwait advanced to the quarter-finals.

==== Table ====
Pos	Team	Pld	W	D	L	GF	GA	GD	Pts	Qualification
1	South Korea	3	3	0	0	5	1	+4	9	Qualification for the quarter-finals
2	Kuwait	3	1	0	2	6	3	+3	3	Qualification for the quarter-finals
3	Japan	3	1	0	2	2	4	−2	3	
4	United Arab Emirates	3	1	0	2	2	7	−5	3	

==== Matches ====
7 December 1998
15:00

Japan	0–2	South Korea
		Choi Yong-soo 31' (pen.), 46'

Rajamangala Stadium, Bangkok
7 December 1998
17:00

United Arab Emirates	0–5	Kuwait
		Al-Saqer 6'; Laheeb 36'; Al-Huwaidi 69', 82', 86'

Rajamangala Stadium, Bangkok

9 December 1998
15:00

United Arab Emirates	1–2	South Korea
Al-Bloushi 66'		Yoon Jong-hwan 38'; Yoo Sang-chul 58' (pen.)

Rajamangala Stadium, Bangkok
9 December 1998
17:00

Japan	2–1	Kuwait
Yamashita 83'; Nakamura 86' (pen.)		Laheeb 69'

Rajamangala Stadium, Bangkok

11 December 1998
15:00

Japan	0–1	United Arab Emirates
		Saeed 60'

Rajamangala Stadium, Bangkok
11 December 1998
17:00

South Korea	1–0	Kuwait
Choi Yong-soo 58'

Rajamangala Stadium, Bangkok

=== Group K ===
China and Iran advanced to the quarter-finals.

==== Table ====
Pos	Team	Pld	W	D	L	GF	GA	GD	Pts	Qualification
1	China	3	2	0	1	10	4	+6	6	Qualification for the quarter-finals
2	Iran	3	2	0	1	9	5	+4	6	Qualification for the quarter-finals
3	Oman	3	1	1	1	8	11	−3	4	
4	Tajikistan	3	0	1	2	4	11	−7	1	

==== Matches ====
8 December 1998
15:00

China	3–1	Tajikistan
Zhao Junzhe 7'; Li Jinyu 56'; Muminov 71' (o.g.)		Zabirov 55'

Supachalasai Stadium, Bangkok
8 December 1998
17:00

Iran	2–4	Oman
Daei 20'; Hashemian 63'		Zayid 24'; Mohammadkhani 41' (o.g.); Al-Dhabit 51'; Salim 90'

Supachalasai Stadium, Bangkok

10 December 1998
15:00

Tajikistan	0–5	Iran
		Daei 5', 71'; Bagheri 11'; Khakpour 18'; Mousavi 49'

Supachalasai Stadium, Bangkok
10 December 1998
17:00

Oman	1–6	China
Al-Dhabit 64'		Hao Haidong 2'; Yao Xia 20'; Li Jinyu 29', 37'; Li Weifeng 62'; Yang Chen 76'

Supachalasai Stadium, Bangkok

12 December 1998
15:00

Iran	2–1	China
Daei 28'; Bagheri 30'		Li Jinyu 10'

Supachalasai Stadium, Bangkok
12 December 1998
17:00

Tajikistan	3–3	Oman
Jabborov 11'; Muminov 25', 68'		Al-Balushi 27'; Salim 43'; Shaaban 85'

Supachalasai Stadium, Bangkok

=== Group L ===
Qatar and Thailand advanced to the quarter-finals.

==== Table ====
Pos	Team	Pld	W	D	L	GF	GA	GD	Pts	Qualification
1	Qatar	3	2	0	1	3	3	0	6	Qualification for the quarter-finals
2	Thailand	3	1	1	1	3	3	0	4	Qualification for the quarter-finals
3	Kazakhstan	3	1	1	1	3	4	−1	4	
4	Lebanon	3	1	0	2	3	2	+1	3	

==== Matches ====
8 December 1998
15:00

Qatar	1–0	Lebanon
Karim 56'

Rajamangala Stadium, Bangkok
8 December 1998
17:00

Thailand	1–1	Kazakhstan
Chalermsan 50'		Zubarev 65'

Rajamangala Stadium, Bangkok

10 December 1998
15:00

Qatar	0–2	Kazakhstan
		Zubarev 13'; Mirzabayev 88'

Rajamangala Stadium, Bangkok
10 December 1998
17:00

Thailand	1–0	Lebanon
Srimaka 33'

Rajamangala Stadium, Bangkok

12 December 1998
15:00

Kazakhstan	0–3	Lebanon
		Al-Indari 13', 49'; Al-Jurdi 76'

Rajamangala Stadium, Bangkok
12 December 1998
17:00

Thailand	1–2	Qatar
Jaturapattarapong 34'		Mustafa 36'; Al-Shemmari 69'

Rajamangala Stadium, Bangkok

== Knockout stage ==
=== Quarter-finals ===
Iran and China advanced to the semi-finals in 90 minutes. Thawatchai Damrong-ongtrakul scored the golden goal in extra time as Thailand defeated South Korea and Kuwait defeated Qatar on penalties.

14 December 1998
14:00

Uzbekistan	0–4	Iran
		Mousavi 29'; Daei 83', 88', 90'

Supachalasai Stadium, Bangkok

14 December 1998
14:00

Thailand	2–1 (a.e.t./g.g.)	South Korea
Senamuang 81'; Damrong-ongtrakul 95'		Yoo Sang-chul 85'

Rajamangala Stadium, Bangkok

14 December 1998
17:00

Turkmenistan	0–3	China
		Peremenin 46' (o.g.); Hao Haidong 59'; Li Jinyu 90'

Supachalasai Stadium, Bangkok

14 December 1998
17:00

Qatar	0–0 (a.e.t.)	Kuwait
Penalties
Mustafa (penalty scored); Anwar (penalty missed); Al-Tamimi (penalty missed); Nahnak (penalty missed)	1–3	(penalty scored) Jasem; (penalty scored) S. Al-Buraiki; (penalty scored) Al-Shammari

Rajamangala Stadium, Bangkok

=== Semi-finals ===
Iran defeated China and Kuwait defeated Thailand to advance to the gold medal match.

16 December 1998
14:00

Iran	1–0	China
Mousavi 55'

Rajamangala Stadium, Bangkok

16 December 1998
17:00

Thailand	0–3	Kuwait
		Al-Khodari 27'; Laheeb 54'; Abdulqoddus 89'

Rajamangala Stadium, Bangkok

== Bronze medal match ==
China defeated Thailand to win the bronze medal.

19 December 1998
14:00

China	3–0	Thailand
Fan Zhiyi 25'; Wang Peng 66'; Ma Mingyu 83'

Tinsulanon Stadium, Songkhla

== Gold medal match ==
Goals from Ali Karimi and Karim Bagheri helped Iran to defeat Kuwait 2–0 and win the gold medal.

19 December 1998
17:00

Iran	2–0	Kuwait
Karimi 6'; Bagheri 26'

Rajamangala Stadium, Bangkok
Referee: Pirom Un-prasert (Thailand)

== Final standing ==
Rank	Team	Pld	W	D	L	GF	GA	GD	Pts
1st place, gold medalist(s)	Iran	8	7	0	1	24	6	+18	21
2nd place, silver medalist(s)	Kuwait	8	3	2	3	23	8	+15	11
3rd place, bronze medalist(s)	China	8	6	0	2	24	7	+17	18
4	Thailand	8	4	1	3	12	10	+2	13
5	Qatar	6	4	1	1	9	4	+5	13
6	South Korea	6	4	0	2	12	6	+6	12
7	Uzbekistan	6	3	2	1	25	8	+17	11
8	Turkmenistan	6	3	2	1	10	9	+1	11
9	Japan	5	3	0	2	8	4	+4	9
10	Kazakhstan	5	2	1	2	8	6	+2	7
11	Oman	5	2	1	2	14	13	+1	7
12	Lebanon	5	2	0	3	9	7	+2	6
13	North Korea	4	1	2	1	6	8	−2	5
14	Tajikistan	5	1	1	3	8	13	−5	4
15	United Arab Emirates	4	1	1	2	5	10	−5	4
16	India	5	1	0	4	3	8	−5	3
17	Nepal	2	0	0	2	0	6	−6	0
17	Vietnam	2	0	0	2	0	6	−6	0
19	Cambodia	2	0	0	2	2	9	−7	0
20	Maldives	2	0	0	2	0	7	−7	0
21	Laos	2	0	0	2	1	11	−10	0
22	Hong Kong	2	0	0	2	0	11	−11	0
23	Mongolia	2	0	0	2	0	26	−26	0
