= 1998 FIFA World Cup qualification – AFC second round =

International football competition

The AFC second round of 1998 FIFA World Cup qualification was contested between the ten group winners from the first round split across two groups.

The top country in each group at the end of the stage progressed to the 1998 FIFA World Cup, with the two runners-up facing each other in a play-off. The winner of this play-off progressed to the 1998 FIFA World Cup and the loser went on to compete for a place in the World Cup in the AFC–OFC inter-confederation play-off.

== Group A ==
| Pos | Team | Pld | W | D | L | GF | GA | GD | Pts | Qualification |
|---|---|---|---|---|---|---|---|---|---|---|
| 1 | Saudi Arabia | 8 | 4 | 2 | 2 | 8 | 6 | +2 | 14 | 1998 FIFA World Cup |
| 2 | Iran | 8 | 3 | 3 | 2 | 13 | 8 | +5 | 12 | Third round |
| 3 | China | 8 | 3 | 2 | 3 | 11 | 14 | −3 | 11 | |
| 4 | Qatar | 8 | 3 | 1 | 4 | 7 | 10 | −3 | 10 | |
| 5 | Kuwait | 8 | 2 | 2 | 4 | 7 | 8 | −1 | 8 | |

Source: RSSSF
13 September 1997
16:15 UTC+8

| China | 2–4 | Iran |
|---|---|---|
| Fan Zhiyi 44' (pen.); Li Ming 54' | Report | Bagheri 61' (pen.); Mahdavikia 67', 73'; Roosta 86' |

Jinzhou Stadium, Dalian
Attendance: 31,000
Referee: Park Hae Yong (South Korea)

14 September 1997
20:30

| Saudi Arabia | 2–1 | Kuwait |
|---|---|---|
| Mehalel 43'; Al-Thuniyan 55' | Report | Abdullah 18' |

King Fahd Stadium, Riyadh
Attendance: 21,500
Referee: Ali Bujsaim (United Arab Emirates)

19 September 1997
18:00

| Iran | 1–1 | Saudi Arabia |
|---|---|---|
| Bagheri 64' | Report | Al-Sharani 32' |

Azadi Stadium, Tehran
Attendance: 120,000
Referee: Masayoshi Okada (Japan)
19 September 1997
18:30

| Qatar | 0–2 | Kuwait |
|---|---|---|
| | Report | Al-Huwaidi 16'; Abdulaziz 88' |

Jassim Bin Hamad Stadium, Doha
Attendance: 10,000
Referee: Jamal Al-Sharif (Syria)

26 September 1997
18:15

| Qatar | 1–1 | China |
|---|---|---|
| Nasir Khamees 10' | Report | Hao Haidong 67' |

Jassim Bin Hamad Stadium, Doha
Attendance: 9,000
Referee: Mahmoud Nurilddin (Iraq)
26 September 1997
19:15

| Kuwait | 1–1 | Iran |
|---|---|---|
| Al-Huwaidi 20' | Report | Bagheri 90' |

Kazma SC Stadium, Kuwait City
Attendance: 25,000
Referee: Jimdamai Russamee (Thailand)

3 October 1997
16:15

| China | 1–0 | Saudi Arabia |
|---|---|---|
| Zhang Enhua 69' | Report |

Jinzhou Stadium, Dalian
Attendance: 30,000
Referee: Pirom Un-Prasert (Thailand)
3 October 1997
17:00

| Iran | 3–0 | Qatar |
|---|---|---|
| Daei 31'; Bagheri 42', 56' | Report |

Azadi Stadium, Tehran
Attendance: 70,000
Referee: Sidi Magassa (Mali)

10 October 1997
19:00

| Kuwait | 1–2 | China |
|---|---|---|
| Al-Huwaidi 24' | Report | Hao Haidong 3'; Gao Feng 89' |

Kazma SC Stadium, Kuwait City
Attendance: 25,000
Referee: Eddie Lennie (Australia)

11 October 1997

| Saudi Arabia | 1–0 | Qatar |
|---|---|---|
| Mehalel 66' | Report |

King Fahd International Stadium, Riyadh
Attendance: 15,000
Referee: Gamal Al-Ghandour (Egypt)

17 October 1997

| Kuwait | 2–1 | Saudi Arabia |
|---|---|---|
| Abdulaziz 48'; Mubarak 67' | Report | Al-Muwallid 31' |

Kazma SC Stadium, Kuwait City
Attendance: 15,000
Referee: Said Belqola (Morocco)
17 October 1997

| Iran | 4–1 | China |
|---|---|---|
| Mansourian 2'; Roosta 44'; Bagheri 69'; Ali Daei 73' | Report | Mao Yijun 87' |

Azadi Stadium, Tehran
Attendance: 100,000
Referee: Ahmad Nabil Ayad (Lebanon)

24 October 1997

| Saudi Arabia | 1–0 | Iran |
|---|---|---|
| Al-Muwallid 88' | Report |

King Fahd International Stadium, Riyadh
Attendance: 55,000
Referee: Arturo Brizio Carter (Mexico)
24 October 1997

| Kuwait | 0–1 | Qatar |
|---|---|---|
| | Report | Al-Noobi 10' |

Kazma SC Stadium, Kuwait City
Attendance: 18,000
Referee: Nazri Abdullah Mohamed (Malaysia)

31 October 1997

| China | 2–3 | Qatar |
|---|---|---|
| Gao Feng 19'; Fan Zhiyi 80' | Report | Al-Naemi 44'; Al-Enazi 54'; Al-Kuwari 60' |

Jinzhou Stadium, Dalian
Attendance: 35,000
Referee: Santhan Nagalingam (Singapore)
31 October 1997

| Iran | 0–0 | Kuwait |
|---|---|---|
| | Report |

Azadi Stadium, Tehran
Attendance: 100,000
Referee: Pirom Un-Prasert (Thailand)

6 November 1997

| Saudi Arabia | 1–1 | China |
|---|---|---|
| Al-Muwallid 4' | Report | Hao Haidong 10' |

King Fahd Stadium, Riyadh
Attendance: 70,000
Referee: David Elleray (England)

7 November 1997

| Qatar | 2–0 | Iran |
|---|---|---|
| Al-Enazi 38', 81' | Report |

Jassim Bin Hamad Stadium, Doha
Attendance: 20,000
Referee: Horacio Elizondo (Argentina)

12 November 1997

| China | 1–0 | Kuwait |
|---|---|---|
| Ma Mingyu 32' | Report |

Jinzhou Stadium, Dalian
Referee: Arturo Angeles (United States)
12 November 1997

| Qatar | 0–1 | Saudi Arabia |
|---|---|---|
| | Report | Al-Shahrani 61' |

Jassim Bin Hamad Stadium, Doha
Referee: Kim Milton Nielsen (Denmark)

== Group B ==
| Pos | Team | Pld | W | D | L | GF | GA | GD | Pts | Qualification |
|---|---|---|---|---|---|---|---|---|---|---|
| 1 | South Korea | 8 | 6 | 1 | 1 | 19 | 7 | +12 | 19 | 1998 FIFA World Cup |
| 2 | Japan | 8 | 3 | 4 | 1 | 17 | 9 | +8 | 13 | Third round |
| 3 | United Arab Emirates | 8 | 2 | 3 | 3 | 9 | 12 | −3 | 9 | |
| 4 | Uzbekistan | 8 | 1 | 3 | 4 | 13 | 18 | −5 | 6 | |
| 5 | Kazakhstan | 8 | 1 | 3 | 4 | 7 | 19 | −12 | 6 | |

Source: RSSSF
6 September 1997
19:00 UTC+9

| South Korea | 3–0 | Kazakhstan |
|---|---|---|
| Choi Yong-soo 24', 67', 74' | Report |

Seoul Olympic Stadium, Seoul
Attendance: 41,219
Referee: Santhan Nagalingam (Singapore)

7 September 1997
19:00 UTC+9

| Japan | 6–3 | Uzbekistan |
|---|---|---|
| Miura 4' (pen.), 40', 64', 80'; Nakata 40'; Jo 44' | Report | Shatskikh 56', 77'; Fyodorov 69' (pen.) |

National Stadium, Tokyo
Attendance: 54,328
Referee: Abdul Rahman Al-Zaid (Saudi Arabia)

12 September 1997

| South Korea | 2–1 | Uzbekistan |
|---|---|---|
| Choi Yong-soo 15'; Lee Sang-yoon 87' | Report | Shatskikh 74' |

Seoul Olympic Stadium, Seoul
Attendance: 70,000
Referee: Wei Jihong (China)
12 September 1997

| United Arab Emirates | 4–0 | Kazakhstan |
|---|---|---|
| Ali 20'; Obaid 48'; Zuhair Bakheet 75'; Mubarak 85' | Report |

Zayed Sports City Stadium, Abu Dhabi
Attendance: 15,000
Referee: Pirom Un-Prasert (Thailand)

19 September 1997

| United Arab Emirates | 0–0 | Japan |
|---|---|---|
| | Report |

Zayed Sports City Stadium, Abu Dhabi
Attendance: 40,000
Referee: Nazri Abdullah Mohamed (Malaysia)

20 September 1997

| Kazakhstan | 1–1 | Uzbekistan |
|---|---|---|
| Baltiyev 84' | Report | Shatskikh 85' |

Central Stadium, Almaty
Attendance: 12,000
Referee: Ahmad Nabil Ayad (Lebanon)

27 September 1997

| Uzbekistan | 2–3 | United Arab Emirates |
|---|---|---|
| Shirshov 10'; Bazarov 90' | Report | Zuhair Bakheet 51'; Alabadla 60'; Adnan Al Talyani 85' |

Pakhtakor Markaziy Stadium, Tashkent
Attendance: 50,000
Referee: Jalal Moradi (Iran)

28 September 1997

| Japan | 1–2 | South Korea |
|---|---|---|
| Yamaguchi 67' | Report | Seo Jung-won 83'; Lee Min-sung 86' |

National Stadium, Tokyo
Attendance: 56,704
Referee: Saad Mane (Kuwait)

4 October 1997

| South Korea | 3–0 | United Arab Emirates |
|---|---|---|
| Ha Seok-ju 8'; Yoo Sang-chul 69'; Lee Sang-yoon 81' | Report |

Seoul Olympic Stadium, Seoul
Referee: Lucien Bouchardeau (Niger)
4 October 1997

| Kazakhstan | 1–1 | Japan |
|---|---|---|
| Zubarev 90+2' | Report | Akita 23' |

Central Stadium, Almaty
Attendance: 10,000
Referee: Taj Addin Fares (Syria)

11 October 1997

| Uzbekistan | 1–1 | Japan |
|---|---|---|
| Kambaraliev 30' | Report | Lopes 89' |

Pakhtakor Markaziy Stadium, Tashkent
Attendance: 54,000
Referee: Sultan Mujalli Al Aalaq (Bahrain)
11 October 1997

| Kazakhstan | 1–1 | South Korea |
|---|---|---|
| Yevteyev 50' | Report | Choi Yong-soo 5' |

Central Stadium, Almaty
Attendance: 15,000
Referee: Omar Abu Loom (Jordan)

18 October 1997

| Uzbekistan | 1–5 | South Korea |
|---|---|---|
| Fedorov 61' (pen.) | Report | Choi Yong-soo 19', 41'; Yoo Sang-chul 38'; Ko Jeong-woon 57'; Kim Do-hoon 70' |

Pakhtakor Markaziy Stadium, Tashkent
Attendance: 38,000
Referee: Abdul Khudheir Abdul Hussein (Iraq)
18 October 1997

| Kazakhstan | 3–0 | United Arab Emirates |
|---|---|---|
| Sparyshev 55'; Yevteyev 64'; Yurist 75' | Report |

Central Stadium, Almaty
Attendance: 18,000
Referee: Nik Ahmad Haji Yaakub (Malaysia)

25 October 1997

| Uzbekistan | 4–0 | Kazakhstan |
|---|---|---|
| Shkvyrin 19', 33'; Fedorov 44'; Kasimov 71' | Report |

Pakhtakor Markaziy Stadium, Tashkent
Attendance: 25,000
Referee: Hassan Al Ajmi (Oman)

26 October 1997

| Japan | 1–1 | United Arab Emirates |
|---|---|---|
| Lopes 4' | Report | Mubarak 37' |

National Stadium, Tokyo
Attendance: 56,000
Referee: Rodrigo Badilla (Costa Rica)

1 November 1997

| South Korea | 0–2 | Japan |
|---|---|---|
| | Report | Nanami 2'; Lopes 37' |

Seoul Olympic Stadium, Seoul
Attendance: 75,000
Referee: Esse Baharmast (United States)

2 November 1997

| United Arab Emirates | 0–0 | Uzbekistan |
|---|---|---|
| | Report |

Zayed Sports City Stadium, Abu Dhabi
Attendance: 30,000
Referee: Khaled Dalu (Syria)

8 November 1997

| Japan | 5–1 | Kazakhstan |
|---|---|---|
| Akita 11'; Nakata 15'; Nakayama 44'; Ihara 66'; Takagi 88' | Report | Yevteyev 73' |

National Stadium, Tokyo
Attendance: 56,032
Referee: Mario van der Ende (Netherlands)

9 November 1997

| United Arab Emirates | 1–3 | South Korea |
|---|---|---|
| Zuhair Bakheet 58' | Report | Lee Sang-yoon 11'; Kim Do-hoon 42', 67' |

Zayed Sports City Stadium, Abu Dhabi
Attendance: 1,800
Referee: Piero Ceccarini (Italy)
