= Khodadad Azizi =

Iranian footballer and coach

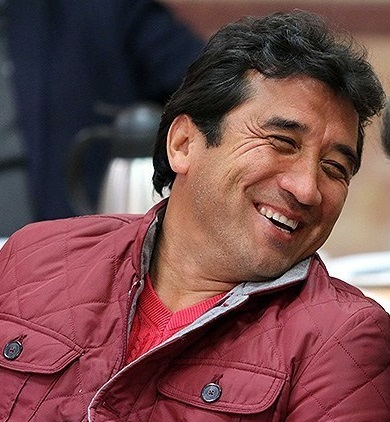
- Azizi in 2019

Personal information
- Full name: Khodadad Azizi
- Date of birth: 22 June 1971 (age 55)
- Place of birth: Fariman,Iran
- Height: 1.69 m (5 ft 7 in)
- Position: Striker

Youth career
- 1983–1988: Aboomoslem

Senior career*
Years	Team	Apps	(Gls)
1988–1993	Aboomoslem		
1993–1995	Fath Tehran		
1995–1996	Bahman		
1996–1997	Persepolis	4	(4)
1997–2000	1. FC Köln	50	(10)
2000	San Jose Earthquakes	20	(3)
2001	Al-Nasr	10	(2)
2001–2005	Pas	82	(23)
2005	Admira Wacker	0	(0)
2005–2006	Oghab		
2006	Rah Ahan	11	(2)

International career
1992–2004	Iran	45	(11)

Managerial career
- 2006–2007: Aboomoslem
- 2008: Payam Khorasan
- 2009: Esteghlal Ahvaz
- 2011–2012: Aboomoslem
- 2015: Shahrdari Tabriz
- 2016–2017: Siah Jamegan
- 2018: Sepidrood Rasht
- 2024: Tractor S.C.
- * Club domestic league appearances and goals

Khodadad Azizi (Persian: خداداد عزیزی; born 22 June 1971) is an Iranian football coach and former player who played as a striker.

== Early life ==
He lived in the Piranshahr neighborhood of Mashhad. As a child, he played soccer with mismatched pair of shoes and at the age of 11, he worked as a construction worker with his brother to support himself. In high school, he was expelled from Haj Taqi Agha Bozorg High School for insulting the sports teacher. Then, with the help of his brother Jahangir Zendedel (the manager of the Abu Muslim club), he enrolled in Amir Kabir High School.

== Club career ==
After playing for a few clubs in Iran and following his performance in Asia, he moved to Germany in 1997 to play for 1. FC Köln. Azizi, along with his Iranian national teammates Ali Daei and Karim Bagheri, were among the first Iranians to enter the Bundesliga.

Having played for three seasons in 1. FC Köln, he signed a contract with California-based club San Jose Earthquakes, became the second Iranian player to play in the United States' Major League Soccer. In 2001, Khodadad Azizi was transferred to the United Arab Emirates club Al Nasr, before returning to Iran and joining Pas Tehran.

In 2005, he signed for Admira Wacker in the Austrian Bundesliga. He returned to Iran soon after and signed for lower division club, Oghab. His stay there was not very lengthy as he signed for Rah Ahan in late 2005.

After the 2005–06 season, Azizi retired from club and international football. He finished his international career with 47 caps and 11 goals. Following his retirement, Azizi was employed by his hometown club, Aboomoslem, as club chairman advisor. Azizi also co-owns a sports clothing label called Majid with financial backing from Abdol Majid Saedifar who put a $400,000 into the company. In September 2011, Khabaronline.ir reported Azizi to be the owner of Siah Jamegaan of Khorasaan, a spin-off of F.C. Aboomoslem.

== International career ==
Azizi represented Iran at the 1996 Asian Cup, 1998 FIFA World Cup, and the 2000 Asian Cup. He was named Asian Player of the Year in 1996, as well as the Asian Cup Most Valuable Player in the 1996 Asian Cup.

Azizi is best remembered for scoring the equaliser against Australia in the second leg World Cup qualifier in November 1997, sending Iran into France 98.

== Coaching career ==
In December 2006, Azizi was appointed the manager of Aboomoslem, a Mashhad based football club that he had started his career with in the early 1990s. He was replaced by Parviz Mazloumi in October 2007. He was head coach of Payam Khorasan and Esteghlal Ahvaz for a short time. In 2011, he was appointed as head coach of Aboomoslem for a second time but parted company with the club on 1 June 2012.

== Career statistics ==
=== Club ===
Appearances and goals by club, season and competition
Club	Season	League			Cup		Continental		Total	
Club	Season	Division	Apps	Goals	Apps	Goals	Apps	Goals	Apps	Goals
Persepolis	1996–97	–	–		–		4	4	4	4
1. FC Köln	1997–98	Bundesliga	20	5	1	0	–		21	5
1. FC Köln	1998–99	2. Bundesliga	27	4	1	0	–		28	4
1. FC Köln	1999–2000	2. Bundesliga	3	1	0	0	–		3	1
1. FC Köln	Total		50	10	2	0	–		52	10
San Jose	2000	MLS	20	3	2	0	–		22	3
Al-Nasr	2000–01	UAE Pro-League	10	2						
Pas	2001–02	Persian Gulf Pro League	19	8			–			
Pas	2002–03	Persian Gulf Pro League	21	4			–			
Pas	2003–04	Persian Gulf Pro League	25	9			–			
Pas	2004–05	Persian Gulf Pro League	17	2						
Pas	Total		82	23						
Admira Wacker	2004–05	Bundesliga	0	0	0	0	–		0	0
Oghab	2005–06	Azadegan League					–			
Rah Ahan	2005–06	Persian Gulf Pro League	10	2			–			
Career total										

=== International ===
Scores and results list Iran's goal tally first, score column indicates score after each Azizi goal.

List of international goals scored by Khodadad Azizi
No.	Date	Venue	Opponent	Score	Result	Competition
1	11 December 1996	Al Maktoum Stadium, Dubai, United Arab Emirates	Saudi Arabia	3–0	3–0	1996 AFC Asian Cup
2	16 December 1996	Al Maktoum Stadium, Dubai, United Arab Emirates	South Korea	2–2	6–2	1996 AFC Asian Cup
3	21 April 1997	Sahand, Tabriz, Iran	Kenya	1–0	3–0	Friendly
4	2 June 1997	Abbasiyyin Stadium, Damascus, Syria	Maldives	5–0	17–0	1998 FIFA World Cup qualification
5	2 June 1997	Abbasiyyin Stadium, Damascus, Syria	Maldives	6–0	17–0	1998 FIFA World Cup qualification
6	9 June 1997	Azadi Stadium, Tehran, Iran	Kyrgyzstan	1–0	3–1	1998 FIFA World Cup qualification
7	9 June 1997	Azadi Stadium, Tehran, Iran	Kyrgyzstan	3–1	3–1	1998 FIFA World Cup qualification
8	11 June 1997	Azadi Stadium, Tehran, Iran	Maldives	9–0	9–0	1998 FIFA World Cup qualification
9	16 November 1997	Larkin Stadium, Johor Bahru, Malaysia	Japan	1–1	2–3 (a.e.t.)	1998 FIFA World Cup qualification
10	22 November 1997	Azadi Stadium, Tehran, Iran	Australia	1–1	1–1	1998 FIFA World Cup qualification
11	29 November 1997	Melbourne Cricket Ground, Melbourne, Australia	Australia	2–2	2–2	1998 FIFA World Cup qualification

== Honours ==
1. FC Köln

- 2. Bundesliga: 1999–2000

Pas

- Iran Pro League: 2003–04

Individual

- AFC Player of the Year: 1996
- AFC Asian Cup Most Valuable Player: 1996
- MLS All-Star: 2000
- MasterCard Asian/Oceanian Team of the 20th Century: 1998
