= Mohammed Salem Al-Enazi =

Emirati footballer (born 1976)

Mohamed Salem Al-Enazi
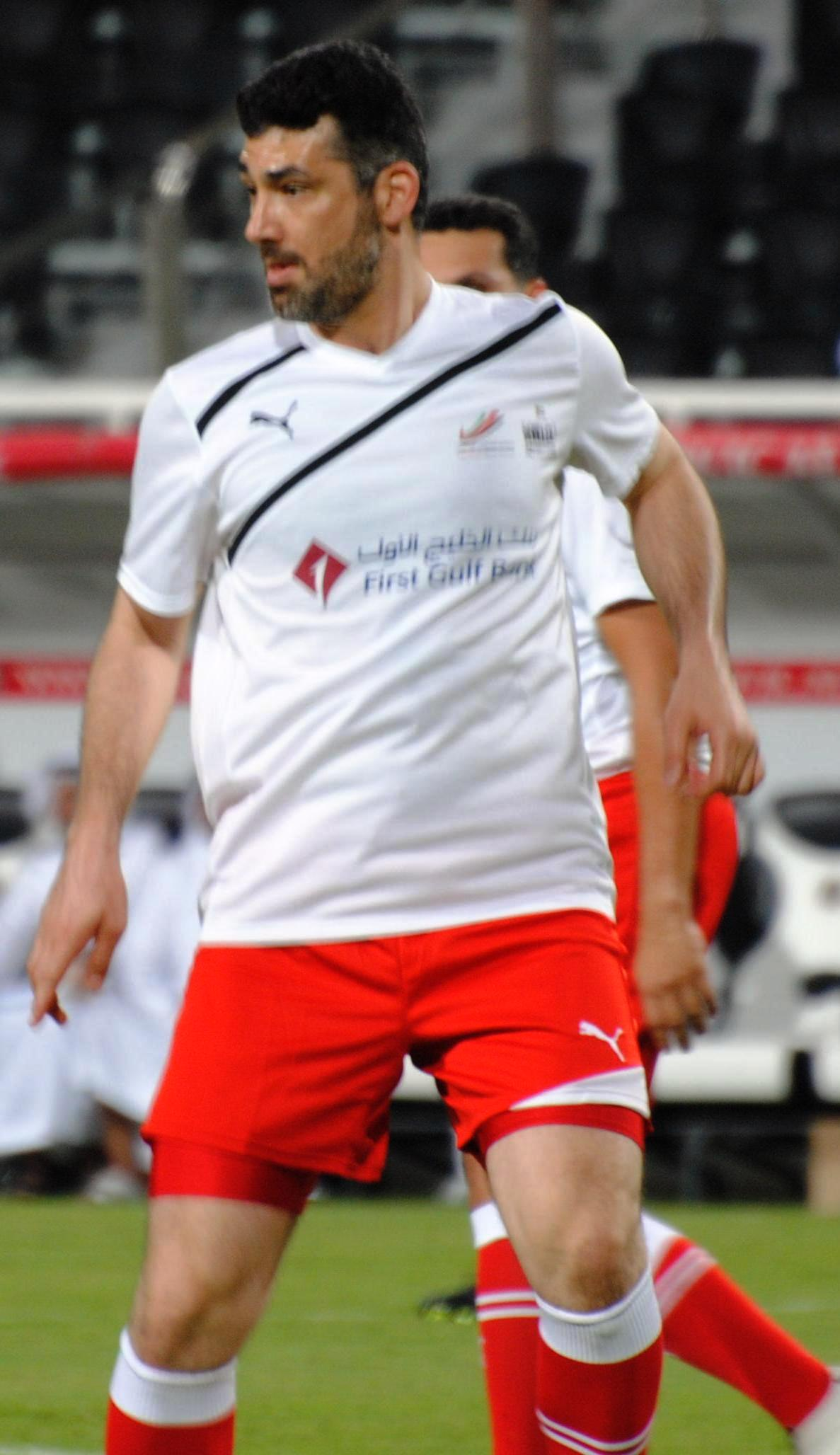

Personal information
- Full name: Mohammed Salem Marzouq; Ghazi Al Sebaie Al Enazi
- Date of birth: 22 November 1976 (age 49)
- Place of birth: Doha, Qatar
- Height: 1.87 m (6 ft 1 1/2 in)
- Position: Striker

Youth career
- 1986–1990: Al-Tadamun
- 1990–1994: Al-Rayyan

Senior career*
| Years | Team | Apps | (Gls) |
| 1994–1999 | Al-Rayyan | | (43) |
| 1997–1998 | → Al-Nassr (loan) | 9 | (7) |
| 1998–1999 | → Qadsia (loan) | 6 | (5) |
| 2000 | Yimpaş Yozgatspor | 3 | (0) |
| 2000–2004 | Al-Wahda | 58 | (49) |
| 2004–2006 | Al-Jazira | 46 | (20) |
| 2006–2008 | Al-Wasl | 32 | (10) |
| 2008–2009 | Al-Nasr | 5 | (0) |
| 2019–2020 | Quattro | 3 | (2) |
| Total | | 248 | (154) |

International career
| 1993 | Qatar U17 | 2 | (1) |
| 1995 | Qatar U20 | 1 | (1) |
| 1996–2003 | Qatar | 69 | (34) |
| 2009 | United Arab Emirates | 2 | (0) |
- * Club domestic league appearances and goals

Mohammed Salem Al Enazi (Arabic: محمد سالم العنزي; born 22 November 1976) is a former professional footballer who played as a striker. Born in Qatar, he represented the Qatar national team before switching to represent the United Arab Emirates national team in 2009.

== Club career ==
=== Early career ===
Al-Enazi started his playing career in the youth team of Al-Tadamun, then in the Qatari Second Division, starting out as a goalkeeper at the age of thirteen. He later moved to Al Rayyan's youth team, and eventually got promoted to the senior squad, where he competed with Mansour Muftah, who is considered the best Qatari striker of all time, for a place in the starting line-up. In 1996, he became the world's fourth highest scorer. Due to this achievement, Iraqi club Talaba SC tried to sign him on a loan deal in 1996, which would have made him the first foreign professional footballer in Iraq, but the transfer never materialized.

=== Al Nassr (loan) ===
==== 1997–98 ====
In 1997, while visiting a friend in Riyadh, Enazi was informed that Al Nassr wanted sign him on loan. He accepted, stating that playing for the club was his childhood dream. The same year, he played in a friendly match against World XI, being 1 of the 12 players representing Asia XI. He scored a goal in the match, although the Asia XI went on to lose the match 3–5, he was praised for his performance.

In 1998, he played alongside legendary strikers Hristo Stoichkov and Majed Abdullah, where he won the Asian Cup Winners Cup. He assisted Stoichkov in scoring the only goal in the final against Suwon, which he described as the most valuable assist in his career.

=== Bayern Munich trial ===
==== 1999–00 ====
In October 1999, Enazi went on trial with German club Bayern Munich. He played on Bayern's team in a friendly tournament and was known as "The Sheikh". Nonetheless, he had returned to Qatar after his trial, and was not contacted by the German side. He would also meet his future Al Wahda teammate, Sérgio, during the trial.

He also had two trials with West Ham United during this period, one of which came directly after his trial with Bayern.

=== Yimpaş Yozgatspor ===
==== 2000–01 ====
Enazi became the first Qatari player to play football professionally in Europe when he joined Turkish club Yimpaş Yozgatspor on a 1-year deal after the foreign player quota in the Turkish league was increased to 6 players in 2000. He played only 107 minutes in the league for the club between August and September 2000. He made his debut against Denizlispor, and he played his last league match against Çaykur Rizespor.

He would transfer to the UAE Pro-League only one month after his last match with Yimpaş.

=== Al Wahda ===
==== 2000–01 ====
After leaving Yimpaş, he joined Al Wahda in November 2000, becoming the first-ever Qatari footballer to play professionally in the UAE Pro League. He was registered as one of the club's two professionals, having replaced Congolese striker Jerry Tondelua in the fifth stage of league matches for a transfer fee of $310,000. He made his debut against Al Jazira in a local derby match on 9 November, scoring his first goal 2 minutes into the match, and finishing off with a hat-trick. He helped his club win the league title and the FA Cup that season, and was dubbed the 'hat-trick man' due to scoring hat-tricks in three successive matches. In the league, he scored 11 goals in his first eight matches, including 2 hat-tricks, against Al Jazira and Al Ahli. He was named the UAE Pro League top scorer in 2001 with 22 goals scored in 17 matches Overall, he scored three hat-tricks, and one super hat-trick in the league.

He scored a hat-trick against Al Urooba in the President's Cup preliminary stage. However, Al Wahda crashed out of the President's Cup in their first match against Sharjah, losing 1–0 in a match which many of their key players were missing from, including Enazi.

==== 2001–02 ====
In his second season, he formed a partnership with Sierra Leone national Lamin Conteh, which led to him in being named the top scorer in the league in 2002.

==== 2002–03 ====
He suffered an injury in the 2002–03 season minutes after scoring a goal against Al Shabab on 12 December in a league match. He fell out of favor with the club's board and supporters late in the season, and he joined Al Jazira in 2004.

==== Qatari football ban ====
He reportedly signed a contract with Al Rayyan in 2003, but had missed team workouts for two consecutive weeks. It was later found out by the administration that he wasn't in Qatar, and had been in the United Arab Emirates. Al Rayyan filed a complaint to the Qatar Football Association, and the latter officially banned Enazi from the Qatar national team and the Qatari League. Qatar national team coach Philippe Troussier had called up Enazi, but due to his ban he was unable to join the national team.

=== Al Jazira ===
==== 2003–04 ====
Al Jazira's Dutch coach, Piet Hamberg, brought Enazi into the team's squad in January 2004. He scored his first hat-trick for the club on 10 March 2004 against Sharjah, however, his team only managed a 3–3 draw after the referee controversially awarded Sharjah with 2 penalties.

==== 2004–05 ====
He was the top scorer of the league in the early stages, scoring 9 goals in the first nine matches. He played offence with striker Mohammed Omar who joined the club in January 2005.

==== 2005–06 ====
He struggled to stay in the first team in the 2005–06 season after sustaining an injury in August which left him out of action for 4 months. The departure of head coach Sef Vergoossen in December resulted in Enazi seeing less playing time for the first team. As a result, he transferred to Al Wasl in 2006.

=== Al Wasl ===
==== 2006–07 ====
Enazi signed for Al Wasl on 21 September 2006. He was presented the no. 23 jersey by Emirati legend Zuhair Bakheet, who had donned the shirt himself during his playing days. He won the league title in his first season with Al Wasl, with his teammate Anderson being the top goalscorer in the league.

==== 2007–08 ====
He scored a goal against Al-Quwa Al-Jawiya in the group stage of the 2008 AFC Champions League which eliminated the Iraqi club. The 2007–08 league season was disappointing for Al Wasl, as they finished 7th place after having won the league in the prior season. He was the captain this season.

=== Al Nasr ===
==== 2008–09 ====
Enazi signed for Dubai-based Al Nasr in September 2008, when the club was overgoing a major player overhaul in preparation for the 2008–09 season. Luka Bonačić, the coach of Al Nasr, did not support his arrival and sought to sell Enazi. Additionally, he benched him for the majority of the 2008–09 season. Bonačić had displayed the same attitude towards a number of new arrivals to the club that season, resulting in the board of directors sacking him in January 2009. Enazi retired from football shortly after, appearing in only 5 league matches for the club.

=== Retirement ===
He retired in 2009 while playing for Al Nasr. He ventured into management, working as the general manager of Emirati club Al Jazira as of 2010.

== Citizenship ==
Enazi was reported as being born in Riyadh, Saudi Arabia, and after the 13th Arabian Gulf Cup, rumours spread that his family were Bidoons from Kuwait. He denied those claims and stated that he was born in Qatar.

He received Emirati citizenship in 2004. His brother, Mohannad Salem Al Enazi, was born in the United Arab Emirates and also has Emirati citizenship, and has represented the UAE national team at the senior level.

== Career statistics ==
=== International ===
Appearances and goals by national team and year
| National team | Year | Apps | Goals |
|---|---|---|---|
| Qatar | 1996 | 15 | 14 |
| Qatar | 1997 | 8 | 3 |
| Qatar | 1998 | 3 | 0 |
| Qatar | 1999 | – | |
| Qatar | 2000 | 15 | 4 |
| Qatar | 2001 | 17 | 8 |
| Qatar | 2002 | 7 | 1 |
| Qatar | 2003 | 4 | 4 |
| Qatar | Total | 69 | 34 |
| United Arab Emirates | 2009 | 2 | 0 |
| United Arab Emirates | Total | 2 | 0 |

Scores and results list Qatar's goal tally first, score column indicates score after each Al-Enazi goal.

List of international goals scored by Mohammed Salem Al-Enazi
| No. | Date | Venue | Opponent | Score | Result | Competition |
|---|---|---|---|---|---|---|
| 1 | 28 June 1996 | Khalifa International Stadium, Doha, Qatar | Syria | 1–0 | 1–0 | 1996 AFC Asian Cup qualification |
| 2 | 5 July 1996 | Khalifa International Stadium, Doha, Qatar | Kazakhstan | 3–0 | 3–0 | 1996 AFC Asian Cup qualification |
| 3 | 19 July 1996 | Abbasiyyin Stadium, Damascus, Syria | Syria | 1–2 | 1–3 | 1996 AFC Asian Cup qualification |
| 4 | 20 September 1996 | Khalifa International Stadium, Doha, Qatar | Sri Lanka | 2–0 | 3–0 | 1998 FIFA World Cup qualification |
| 5 | 23 September 1996 | Khalifa International Stadium, Doha, Qatar | Philippines | 1–0 | 5–0 | 1998 FIFA World Cup qualification |
| 6 | 23 September 1996 | Khalifa International Stadium, Doha, Qatar | Philippines | 5–0 | 5–0 | 1998 FIFA World Cup qualification |
| 7 | 27 September 1996 | Khalifa International Stadium, Doha, Qatar | India | 1–0 | 6–0 | 1998 FIFA World Cup qualification |
| 8 | 27 September 1996 | Khalifa International Stadium, Doha, Qatar | India | 2–0 | 6–0 | 1998 FIFA World Cup qualification |
| 9 | 5 October 1996 | Khalifa International Stadium, Doha, Qatar | New Zealand | 1–? | 3–2 | Friendly |
| 10 | 5 October 1996 | Khalifa International Stadium, Doha, Qatar | New Zealand | 2–? | 3–2 | Friendly |
| 11 | 21 October 1996 | Sultan Qaboos Sports Complex, Muscat, Oman | Oman | 2–0 | 3–0 | 13th Arabian Gulf Cup |
| 12 | 21 October 1996 | Sultan Qaboos Sports Complex, Muscat, Oman | Oman | 3–0 | 3–0 | 13th Arabian Gulf Cup |
| 13 | 25 October 1996 | Sultan Qaboos Sports Complex, Muscat, Oman | Bahrain | 2–0 | 2–1 | 13th Arabian Gulf Cup |
| 14 | 28 October 1996 | Sultan Qaboos Sports Complex, Muscat, Oman | Kuwait | 1–2 | 1–2 | 13th Arabian Gulf Cup |
| 15 | 31 October 1997 | Jinzhou Stadium, Dalian, China | China | 2–1 | 3–2 | 1998 FIFA World Cup qualification |
| 16 | 7 November 1997 | Jassim bin Hamad Stadium, Doha, Qatar | Iran | 1–0 | 2–0 | 1998 FIFA World Cup qualification |
| 17 | 7 November 1997 | Jassim bin Hamad Stadium, Doha, Qatar | Iran | 2–0 | 2–0 | 1998 FIFA World Cup qualification |
| 18 | 10 March 2000 | Jassim bin Hamad Stadium, Doha, Qatar | Sudan | ?–0 | 3–0 | Friendly |
| 19 | 2 April 2000 | Jassim bin Hamad Stadium, Doha, Qatar | Kazakhstan | 3–0 | 3–1 | 2000 AFC Asian Cup qualification |
| 20 | 8 April 2000 | Jassim bin Hamad Stadium, Doha, Qatar | Jordan | 2–2 | 2–2 | 2000 AFC Asian qualification |
| 21 | 23 October 2000 | Saida Municipal Stadium, Saidon, Lebanon | China | 1–3 | 1–3 | 2000 AFC Asian Cup |
| 22 | 5 January 2001 | Hamad bin Khalifa Stadium, Doha, Qatar | Jordan | 1–1 | 3–1 | Friendly |
| 23 | 4 March 2001 | Hong Kong Stadium, Causeway Bay, Hong Kong | Malaysia | 1–1 | 5–1 | 2002 FIFA World Cup qualification |
| 24 | 4 March 2001 | Hong Kong Stadium, Causeway Bay, Hong Kong | Malaysia | 2–1 | 5–1 | 2002 FIFA World Cup qualification |
| 25 | 4 March 2001 | Hong Kong Stadium, Causeway Bay, Hong Kong | Malaysia | 4–1 | 5–1 | 2002 FIFA World Cup qualification |
| 26 | 11 March 2001 | Hong Kong Stadium, Causeway Bay, Hong Kong | Hong Kong | 1–0 | 2–0 | 2002 FIFA World Cup qualification |
| 27 | 23 March 2001 | Jassim bin Hamad Stadium, Doha, Qatar | Palestine | 1–0 | 2–1 | 2002 FIFA World Cup qualification |
| 28 | 21 September 2001 | Sultan Qaboos Sports Complex, Muscat, Oman | Oman | 3–0 | 3–0 | 2002 FIFA World Cup qualification |
| 29 | 28 September 2001 | Khalifa International Stadium, Doha, Qatar | Uzbekistan | 1–0 | 2–2 | 2002 FIFA World Cup qualification |
| 30 | 13 January 2002 | Suheim bin Hamad Stadium, Doha, Qatar | Iraq | 1–0 | 1–3 | Friendly |
| 31 | 16 February 2003 | Supachalasai Stadium, Bangkok, Thailand | Sweden | 2–3 | 2–3 | 2003 King's Cup |
| 32 | 18 February 2003 | Supachalasai Stadium, Bangkok, Thailand | Thailand | 1–1 | 1–1 | 2003 King's Cup |
| 33 | 20 February 2003 | Supachalasai Stadium, Bangkok, Thailand | North Korea | 1–2 | 2–2 | 2003 King's Cup |
| 34 | 20 February 2003 | Supachalasai Stadium, Bangkok, Thailand | North Korea | 2–2 | 2–2 | 2003 King's Cup |

== Honours ==
=== Al-Nassr ===
- Asian Cup Winners' Cup: 1997–98
- Asian Super Cup: 1998

=== Individual ===
- 13th Arabian Gulf Cup: Top Scorer
- 1996 GCC Champions League: Top Scorer
- 1998 FIFA World Cup Preliminary qualifiers: Top Scorer
- Qatar Stars League: Top Scorer
- UAE Pro-League: Top Scorer (2)
