= Zaher Al Indari =

Lebanese footballer (born 1971)

Personal information
- Full name: Zaher Toufic Al Indari
- Date of birth: 26 May 1971 (age 55)
- Place of birth: Abadiyeh, Lebanon
- Height: 1.81 m (5 ft 11 in)
- Position: Striker

Youth career
- 1988–1989: Ahli Aley (Note: Al Indari played for Al Ahli Club Aley, who merged with Akhaa Club to form Akhaa Ahli Aley in 1990.)

Senior career*
Years	Team	Apps	(Gls)
1989–2003	Akhaa Ahli Aley	180	(40)
2003–2005	Safa	20	(6)
2005–2006	Akhaa Ahli Aley	14	(5)
Total		214	(51)

International career
1996–2001	Lebanon	42	(7)
- * Club domestic league appearances and goals

Zaher Toufic Al Indari (Arabic: زاهر توفيق العنداري; born 26 May 1971) is a Lebanese former footballer who played as a striker.

== Club career ==
Al Indari began his senior career in 1989 with Ahli Aley in the Lebanese Third Division, which merged with Akhaa Club to form Akhaa Ahli Aley in 1990. In 1991–92 Akhaa Ahli Aley won the Lebanese Second Division, gaining promotion to the Lebanese Premier League for the first time in their history.

Al Indari stayed at the club until 2003, when he moved to Safa. In his two seasons at the club, Al Indari scored six league goals, three in each season. After two seasons at the club, in 2005 Al Indari moved back to Akhaa Ahli, which had just relegated to the Lebanese Second Division after 25 years in the top-flight. Al Indari retired following the 2005–06 season.

== International career ==
Between 1996 and 2001, Al Indari represented Lebanon internationally. He scored four goals in 20 games, with his first goal coming against Saudi Arabia at the 1998 Arab Nations Cup. On 12 December 1998, Al Indari scored a brace against Kazakhstan at the 1998 Asian Games.

== Career statistics ==
=== International ===
Scores and results list Lebanon's goal tally first, score column indicates score after each Al Indari goal.

List of international goals scored by Zaher Al Indari
No.	Date	Venue	Opponent	Score	Result	Competition	Ref.
1	27 September 1998	Jassim bin Hamad Stadium, Doha, Qatar	Saudi Arabia	1–4	1–4	1998 Arab Cup	
2	4 December 1998	Surat Thani Province Stadium, Surat Thani, Thailand	Cambodia	3–0	5–1	1998 Asian Games	
3	12 December 1998	Rajamangala Stadium, Bangkok, Thailand	Kazakhstan	1–0	3–0	1998 Asian Games	
4	12 December 1998	Rajamangala Stadium, Bangkok, Thailand	Kazakhstan	2–0	3–0	1998 Asian Games	

== Honours ==
Akhaa Ahli Aley

- Lebanese Second Division: 1991–92

Individual

- Lebanese Premier League Best Goal: 1998–99
