= Dudley Lincoln Steinwall =

Sri Lankan football manager and player

Personal information
- Date of birth: 9 November 1974 (age 51)
- Place of birth: Anuradhapura, Sri Lanka
- Height: 1.86 m (6 ft 1 in)
- Positions: Center-back; central midfielder

Senior career*
| Years | Team | Apps | (Gls) |
| 1992–2002 | Renown | | |
| 2002 | Club Valencia | | |
| 2002–2004 | Renown | | |
| 2004–2005 | Blue Star | | |
| 2005–2007 | Negambo Youth | | |
| 2007–2009 | Ratnam | | |
| 2009 | Negambo Youth | | |

International career
| 1993–2009 | Sri Lanka | 50 | (3) |

Managerial career
- 2016–2018: Sri Lanka
- * Club domestic league appearances and goals

Dudley Lincoln Steinwall (born 9 November 1974) is a Sri Lankan football manager and former footballer who served as head coach of the Sri Lanka national football team from 2016 to 2018. He last played for Negambo Youth as a center-back in domestic club football.

== Playing career ==
Steinwall has played club football for Renown, Club Valencia, Blue Star, Negambo Youth and Ratnam.

He represented Sri Lanka from 1993 to 2009.

== Coaching career ==
Steinwall was appointed coach of Sri Lanka in April 2016 succeeding Sampath Perera.

== Personal life ==
His older brother Chaminda Steinwall is also a former Sri Lanka national team player.
