= Ma Mingyu =

Chinese footballer (born 1970)

Ma Mingyu 马明宇
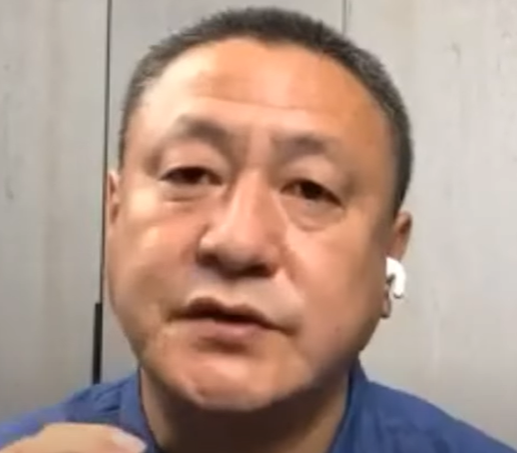
- Ma in 2022

Personal information
- Date of birth: 4 February 1970 (age 56)
- Place of birth: Chongqing, Sichuan, China
- Height: 1.76 m (5 ft 9 in)
- Position: Attacking midfielder

Senior career*
Years	Team	Apps	(Gls)
1990–1994	Sichuan Quanxing		
1995–1996	Guangdong Hongyuan	42	(9)
1997–2000	Sichuan Quanxing	88	(8)
2000–2001	Perugia	0	(0)
2001–2003	Sichuan Guancheng	65	(5)

International career
1996–2002	China	88	(13)
Medal record
Men's football
Representing China
Asian Games
Bronze medal – third place	1998 Bangkok	Football
- * Club domestic league appearances and goals

Ma Mingyu (simplified Chinese: 马明宇; traditional Chinese: 馬明宇; pinyin: Mǎ Míngyǔ; born 4 February 1970) is a Chinese former professional footballer who played as a midfielder. He represented Sichuan Quanxing throughout the majority of his career, having several spells with them. He also represented Guangdong Hongyuan and Italian Serie A side Perugia. Internationally he played in the 1996 AFC Asian Cup, 2000 AFC Asian Cup and captained China's campaign during the 2002 FIFA World Cup.

== Club career ==
Ma Mingyu was born in Chongqing, Sichuan. He predominantly played for top tier Chinese club Sichuan Guancheng where he spent several spells with them throughout his football career. In his first spell with them he would attract attention from Guangdong Hongyuan after Ma had a prolific 1994 league season that saw him play 21 games and score 3 goals. Ma would move to Guangdong Hongyuan at the beginning of 1995 league season, however despite a promising start that saw Guangdong come 4th in the league his time with Guangdong saw him win nothing with them and after a disappointing 1996 league season that saw Guangdong come 9th, Ma returned to Sichuan.

Ma Mingyu's second spell at Sichuan Guancheng was to prove considerably more successful with Sichuan as they were genuine title contenders during this period and came 3rd in the 1999 and 2000 league seasons. With Ma firmly established as a permanent fixture within Sichuan's left midfield and becoming a member of the Chinese national team he would attract attention from Italian team Perugia Calcio in the Serie A in the 2000–01 season. His time at Perugia, however was a disaster as he played in no games for them and he returned to Sichuan Guancheng where he has started to play first team football on a regular basis in preparation for the World Cup. At the end of the 2003 league season he would decide to retire from professional football.

== International career ==
As an attacking left-footed midfielder Ma Mingyu would break into the senior team on 30 January 1996, when he made his debut in a qualifier for the 1996 AFC Asian Cup against Macau in a 7–1 victory. In the next qualifying game against the Philippines on 1 February 1996, he would score his first goal in a 7–0 victory. After several friendlies he would go to establish himself as a regular within the squad and then go to the 1996 AFC Asian Cup. At the end of the campaign, he had become an integral member of the Chinese team and when Bora Milutinović came in as the new head coach Ma Mingyu would be named as his captain. During his captaincy he would lead China to a fourth-place finish at the 2000 AFC Asian Cup and see the team qualify for their first FIFA World Cup tournament in 2002. Once Bora Milutinović left at the end of the campaign Ma Mingyu's international career would also end.

== Career statistics ==
=== International ===
Appearances and goals by national team and year
National team	Year	Apps	Goals
China	1996	14	3
China	1997	24	2
China	1998	14	4
China	1999	–	
China	2000	15	2
China	2001	15	2
China	2002	6	0
Total		88	13

Scores and results list China's goal tally first, score column indicates score after each Ma goal.

List of international goals scored by Ma Mingyu
No.	Date	Venue	Opponent	Score	Result	Competition
1	1 February 1996	Mong Kok Stadium, Kowloon, Hong Kong	Philippines	3–0	7–0	1996 AFC Asian Cup qualification
2	17 July 1996	Workers' Stadium, Beijing, China	Uruguay	1–1	1–1	Friendly
3	9 December 1996	Tahnoun Bin Mohamed Stadium, Al Ain, United Arab Emirates	Syria	1–0	3–0	1996 AFC Asian Cup
4	22 July 1997	Workers' Stadium, Beijing, China	Vietnam	3–0	4–0	1998 FIFA World Cup qualification
5	12 November 1996	Jinzhou Stadium, Dalian, China	Kuwait	1–0	1–0	1998 FIFA World Cup qualification
6	4 June 1998	Seoul Olympic Stadium, Seoul, South Korea	South Korea	1–1	1–1	Friendly
7	8 July 1998	Shanghai Stadium, Shanghai, China	Uzbekistan	?–?	3–1	Friendly
8	30 November 1998	Surat Thani Stadium, Surat Thani, Thailand	Lebanon	2–0	4–1	1998 Asian Games
9	19 December 1998	Tinsulanon Stadium, Songkhla, Thailand	Thailand	3–0	3–0	1998 Asian Games
10	26 January 2000	Thống Nhất Stadium, Ho Chi Minh City, Vietnam	Guam	2–0	19–0	2000 AFC Asian Cup qualification
11	17 July 1996	Tripoli International Olympic Stadium, Tripoli, Lebanon	Uruguay	1–1	2–2	2000 AFC Asian Cup
12.	6 May 2001	RCAF Old Stadium, Phnom Penh, Cambodia	Cambodia	3–0	4–0	2002 FIFA World Cup qualification
13	20 May 2001	Guangdong Olympic Stadium, Guangzhou, China	Cambodia	1–0	3–1	2002 FIFA World Cup qualification
