= Arsen Avakov (footballer) =

Tajikistani footballer

Personal information
- Full name: Arsen Georgievich Avakov
- Date of birth: 28 May 1971 (age 55)
- Place of birth: Dushanbe, Tajik SSR, Soviet Union
- Height: 1.85 m (6 ft 1 in)
- Position: Striker

Senior career*
Years	Team	Apps	(Gls)
1988–1992	Pomir Dushanbe	7	(0)
1992–1994	Temp Shepetivka	48	(7)
1994–1996	Torpedo Zaporizhzhia	48	(25)
1996–2000	Torpedo Moscow	72	(13)
1996	→ Torpedo-Luzhniki-d	5	(8)
1997	→ Shinnik Yaroslavl (loan)	17	(4)
1999	→ Lokomotiv Nizhniy Novgorod (loan)	28	(13)
2001–2002	Uralan Elista	53	(16)
Total		278	(84)

International career
1992–1999	Tajikistan	10	(5)

Managerial career
- 2014–2018: TSK Simferopol (team director)
- * Club domestic league appearances and goals

Arsen Georgievich Avakov (born 28 May 1971) is a former Tajikistani football player. He is of Armenian descent. Arsen won the top scorer award in the Ukrainian Premier League in 1995 while playing for FC Torpedo Zaporizhia, the first foreign player in history of the Ukrainian Premier League to do so.

Avakov began his playing career with FC Pamir Dushanbe in the Soviet Top League, before moving to clubs in Ukraine. He finished his career with FC Torpedo Moscow, FC Shinnik Yaroslavl, FC Lokomotiv Nizhny Novgorod and FC Uralan Elista in the Russian Premier League.

== International career stats ==
=== Goals for senior national team ===
#	Date	Venue	Opponent	Score	Result	Competition
1.	8 May 1996	Dushanbe, Tajikistan	Uzbekistan	4–0	4–0	1996 AFC Asian Cup qualification
2.	1 June 1997	Ho Chi Minh City, Vietnam	Vietnam	0–3	0–4	1998 FIFA World Cup qualification
3.	22 June 1997	Dushanbe, Tajikistan	Turkmenistan	1–0	5–0	1998 FIFA World Cup qualification
4.	22 June 1997	Dushanbe, Tajikistan	Turkmenistan	3–0	5–0	1998 FIFA World Cup qualification
5.	22 June 1997	Dushanbe, Tajikistan	Turkmenistan	4–0	5–0	1998 FIFA World Cup qualification
