= Dahi Al Naemi =

Qatari footballer (born 1978)

Personal information
- Full name: Dahi Saad Nawal Rahman Al-Naemi
- Date of birth: 5 September 1978 (age 48)
- Place of birth: Qatar
- Height: 1.74 m (5 ft 9 in)
- Position: Defender

Senior career*
| Years | Team | Apps | (Gls) |
| 1995–2005 | Al Sadd | 124 | (2) |
| 2005–2007 | Al Wakrah | 38 | (0) |
| 2007 | Al-Rayyan | 7 | (0) |
| 2007–2011 | Umm-Salal | 55 | (2) |

International career^{‡}
| 1997–2005 | Qatar | 75 | (4) |
- * Club domestic league appearances and goals as of 29 December 2011 ‡ National team caps and goals as of 29 December 2011

Dahi Al Naemi (born 5 September 1978) is a Qatari footballer who was a defender for Umm-Salal.

Al Naemi played for Qatar at the 1995 FIFA U-17 World Championship in Ecuador. He subsequently played for the senior national team in FIFA World Cup Qualifiers 1998, 2002 and 2006. In 2009, his club Umm-Salal became the first Qatari side in history to reach the semi-finals of the AFC Champions League.

== Career statistics ==
=== International ===
Appearances and goals by national team and year
| National team | Year | Apps | Goals |
|---|---|---|---|
| Qatar | 1997 | 8 | 1 |
| Qatar | 1998 | 16 | 0 |
| Qatar | 1999 | – | |
| Qatar | 2000 | 13 | 0 |
| Qatar | 2001 | 22 | 3 |
| Qatar | 2002 | 5 | 0 |
| Qatar | 2003 | 5 | 0 |
| Qatar | 2004 | 5 | 0 |
| Qatar | 2005 | 1 | 0 |
| Total | | 75 | 4 |

Scores and results list Qatar's goal tally first, score column indicates score after each Al Naemi goal.

List of international goals scored by Dahi Al Naemi
| No. | Date | Venue | Opponent | Score | Result | Competition |
|---|---|---|---|---|---|---|
| 1 | 31 October 1997 | Jinzhou Stadium, Dalian, China | China | 1–1 | 3–2 | 1998 FIFA World Cup qualification |
| 2 | 8 March 2001 | Hong Kong Stadium, Causeway Bay, Hong Kong | Palestine | 1–0 | 2–1 | 2002 FIFA World Cup qualification |
| 3 | 25 March 2001 | Jassim bin Hamad Stadium, Doha, Qatar | Hong Kong | 1–0 | 3–0 | 2002 FIFA World Cup qualification |
| 4 | 7 September 2001 | Khalifa International Stadium, Doha, Qatar | China | 1–0 | 1–1 | 2002 FIFA World Cup qualification |
