= Khaled Al Zaher =

Syrian footballer

Personal information
- Full name: Mohammad Khaled Al Zaher
- Date of birth: 2 September 1972 (age 54)
- Place of birth: Syria
- Height: 1.68 m (5 ft 6 in)
- Position: Midfielder

Senior career*
Years	Team	Apps	(Gls)
1996–1998	Al-Horriya		
1998–2003	Proodeftiki	137	(13)
2003–2005	Halkidona	67	(0)
2005–2006	Thrasyvoulos	25	(0)
2006–2008	Tadamon Sour		
2008–2009	Al-Ittihad		(0)

International career
1996–2004	Syria	23	(6)
- * Club domestic league appearances and goals

Khaled Al Zaher (Arabic: خالد الظاهر; born 2 September 1972) is a Syrian former footballer.

== Club career ==
Al Zaher played for most of his career in Greece, including three seasons with Proodeftiki in the Super League Greece. He made over 100 league appearances for Proodeftiki before joining Halkidona. He was released by Halkidona at age 33 in 2005.

== International career ==
From 1997 to 2005, Al Zaher made several appearances for the senior Syria national football team, including 11 qualifying matches for the FIFA World Cup.

He also played for Syria at the 1995 FIFA World Youth Championship in Qatar.

== Career statistics ==
=== International ===
Appearances and goals by national team and year
National team	Year	Apps	Goals
Syria	1996	4	0
Syria	1997	6	3
Syria	1998	–	
Syria	1999	1	0
Syria	2000	2	1
Syria	2001	6	2
Syria	2002	–	
Syria	2003	3	0
Syria	2004	1	0
Total		23	6

Scores and results list Syria's goal tally first, score column indicates score after each Al Zaher goal.

List of international goals scored by Khaled Al Zaher
No.	Date	Venue	Opponent	Score	Result	Competition
1	4 June 1997	Abbasiyyin Stadium, Damascus, Syria	Maldives	8–0	12–0	1998 FIFA World Cup qualification
2	9 June 1997	Azadi Stadium, Tehran, Iran	Maldives	9–0	12–0	1998 FIFA World Cup qualification
3	9 June 1997	Azadi Stadium, Tehran, Iran	Maldives	11–0	12–0	1998 FIFA World Cup qualification
4	9 April 2000	Azadi Stadium, Tehran, Iran	Maldives	1–0	2–1	2000 AFC Asian Cup qualification
5	11 May 2001	Al-Hamadaniah Stadium, Aleppo, Syria	Laos	6–0	9–0	2002 FIFA World Cup qualification
6	11 May 2001	Al-Hamadaniah Stadium, Aleppo, Syria	Laos	7–0	9–0	2002 FIFA World Cup qualification
