= Reza Shahroudi =

Iranian footballer

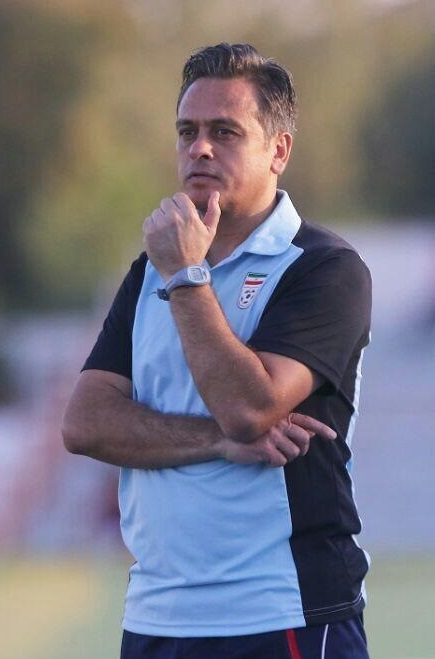

Personal information
- Full name: Reza Shahroudi
- Date of birth: February 21, 1972 (age 54)
- Place of birth: Tehran, Iran
- Position: Left winger

Team information
- Current team: Iran U23 (assistant)

Youth career
- Afshin
- Tohid
- Keshavarz

Senior career*
Years	Team	Apps	(Gls)
1990–1992	Keshavarz		
1992–1997	Persepolis		
1997–1998	Altay		
1998–1999	Persepolis		
1999	→ Dalian Shide (loan)		
2000–2003	Persepolis		
2003–2005	Pasargad		
2005–2006	Paykan		

International career^{‡}
1996–1998	Iran	40	(5)

Managerial career
- 2006–2007: Damash Tehran (assistant)
- 2007–2008: Kowsar Tehran (assistant)
- 2010–2011: Steel Azin (assistant)
- 2018–: Iran U23 (assistant)
- * Club domestic league appearances and goals as of 9 October 2026 ‡ National team caps and goals as of 9 October 2026

Reza Shahroudi (Persian: رضا شاهرودی, born February 21, 1972) is a retired Iranian football player.

He played mostly for Persepolis. Shahroudi made 40 appearances for the Iran national football team and participated at 1998 FIFA World Cup.

He was also the coach of Damash Tehran who were set up in July 2006 by a private investor and played in Iran Football's 2nd Division at that time.

== Career statistics ==
=== Club career statistics ===
Club performance			League		Cup		Continental		Total	
Season	Club	League	Apps	Goals	Apps	Goals	Apps	Goals	Apps	Goals
Iran			League		Hazfi Cup		Asia		Total	
2000–01	Persepolis	Azadegan League								
2001–02	Persepolis	Iran Pro League					-	-		
2002–03	Persepolis	Iran Pro League	2	0						
Career total										

=== International goals ===
#	Date	Venue	Opponent	Score	Result	Competition
1.	19 June 1996	Sultan Qaboos Sports Complex, Muscat, Oman	Nepal	4–0	4–0	1996 AFC Asian Cup qualification
2.	11 April 1997	Kuwait City, Kuwait	Kuwait	1–0	2–0	Friendly
3.	2 June 1997	Abbasiyyin Stadium, Damascus, Syria	Maldives	9–0	17–0	1998 FIFA World Cup qualification
4.	11 June 1997	Azadi Stadium, Tehran, Iran	Maldives	8–0	9–0	1998 FIFA World Cup qualification
5.	13 June 1997	Azadi Stadium, Tehran, Iran	Syria	1–0	2–2	1998 FIFA World Cup qualification
Correct as of 24 July 2021
