= Ammar Rihawi =

Syrian footballer (born 1975)

Ammar Abduallah Rihawi
Personal information
- Full name: Ammar Abduallah Mohammed Rihawi
- Date of birth: 20 June 1975 (age 51)
- Place of birth: Aleppo, Syria
- Height: 1.73 m (5 ft 8 in)
- Position: Midfielder

Senior career*
Years	Team	Apps	(Gls)
1994–1996	Al-Ittihad		
1996–1999	Al-Jaish		
1999–2000	Al-Naser		
2000–2001	Homenetmen Beirut		
2001–2008	Al-Ittihad		
2008	Kalba Club		

International career
1994–1995	Syria U-20		
1996–2002	Syria		

Managerial career
- 2010: Al-Ittihad (assistant manager)
- 2010–2012: Al-Shorta (assistant manager)
- 2012–2013: Al-Ittihad
- 2013: Syria (assistant manager)
- 2013–2014: Naft Maysan (assistant manager)
- 2017–2018: Al-Talaba (assistant manager)
- 2019–2021: Al-Mina'a (assistant manager)
- 2021–: Syria (assistant manager)
- * Club domestic league appearances and goals

Ammar Rihawi (Arabic: عمار ريحاوي; born on 20 June 1975) is a Syrian football coach and former player who played as a midfielder.

== International career ==
Rihawi was a part of the Syrian U-19 team that won the 1994 AFC U-19 Championship in Indonesia and he was a part of the Syrian U-20 team at the 1995 FIFA U-20 World Cup in Qatar. In addition, he competed with the national team at the 1996 AFC Asian Cup in the United Arab Emirates, and played again for Syria at the 1998 FIFA World Cup qualification.

== Managerial statistics ==
As of match played 17 May 2013

Managerial record by team and tenure
Team	From	To	Record					Ref.
Team	From	To	P	W	D	L	Win %	Ref.
Al-Ittihad	10 July 2012	17 May 2013	11	5	1	5	45.5	
Total			11	5	1	5	45.5	—
