= Chaminda Steinwall =

Sri Lankan footballer

Personal information
- Full name: Chaminda Neil Steinwall
- Date of birth: 15 September 1969 (age 57)
- Place of birth: Anuradhapura, Sri Lanka
- Height: 1.78 m (5 ft 10 in)
- Position: Center-forward

Senior career*
Years	Team	Apps	(Gls)
- Air Force
- Renown

International career
1989–1996	Sri Lanka		

Managerial career
- 2010: Sri lanka Women
- 2022: Sri lanka Women
- * Club domestic league appearances and goals

Chaminda Steinwall (born 15 September 1969) is a Sri Lankan former football player and manager. He represented the Sri Lanka national team from 1989 to 1996.

== Club career ==
Steinwall represented both Renown SC and the Sri Lanka Air Force. He captained Renown to the Bristol Cup in 1994–95, scoring in a 2–0 victory against Ratnam SC in the final. He also won the tournament's Golden Boot Award.

== International career ==
Steinwall represented the Sri Lanka national team from 1989 to 1996. He notably missed the 1995 SAARC Gold Cup due to injury, and was replaced by Mohamed Amanulla.

== Coaching career ==
In 2015, Steinwall served as the Acting Technical Director of the Football Federation of Sri Lanka.

Steinwall managed the Sri Lanka women's national team in both the 2010 SAFF Women's Championship and 2022 SAFF Women's Championship.

== Personal life ==
His younger brother Dudley Lincoln Steinwall is also a former Sri Lanka national team player.

== Career statistics ==
=== International ===
Scores and results list Sri Lanka's goal tally first.

List of international goals scored by Steinwall
#	Date	Venue	Opponent	Score	Result	Competition
1.	26 December 1993	Mirpur Stadium, Dhaka, Bangladesh	Maldives	2–0	3–1	1993 South Asian Games
2.	26 December 1993	Mirpur Stadium, Dhaka, Bangladesh	Maldives	3–1	3–1	1993 South Asian Games
3.	21 June 1996	Sultan Qaboos Sports Complex, Muscat, Oman	Nepal	1–0	2–0	1996 AFC Asian Cup qualification
4.	26 September 1996	Khalifa International Stadium, Doha, Qatar	Philippines	1–0	3–0	1998 FIFA World Cup qualification

== Honours ==
Renown

- Bristol Cup: 1994–95
