= Alexei Klishin =

Kazakhstani footballer

Personal information
- Full name: Alexei Nikolayevich Klishin
- Date of birth: 1 October 1973 (age 53)
- Place of birth: Karaganda, Kazakh SSR, Soviet Union
- Height: 1.82 m (6 ft 0 in)
- Position: Midfielder

Senior career*
Years	Team	Apps	(Gls)
1991	RShVSM Alma-Ata	28	(2)
1992	Arman	31	(11)
1993	Dinamo Almaty	12	(1)
1993	Dostyk	25	(3)
1994–1995	Skonto Rīga	25	(5)
1995	Tallinna Sadam	9	(1)
1996	Munaishy	27	(3)
1997	Kairat	12	(0)
1998–2000	Irtysh Pavlodar	69	(10)
2000	Access-Golden Grain	11	(2)
2001	Irtysh Pavlodar	29	(6)
2002	Zhenis Astana	31	(6)
2003	Shakhter Karagandy	28	(0)
2004	Esil Bogatyr	14	(1)
2004	Vostok	14	(2)
2005	Spartak Semey	20	(2)
2007–2008	Megasport	31	(6)
Total		416	(61)

International career^{‡}
1997–2000	Kazakhstan	8	(3)
- * Club domestic league appearances and goals as of 22 March 2017 ‡ National team caps and goals as of 22 March 2017

Alexei Nikolayevich Klishin (born 1 October 1973) is a retired Kazakh football midfielder.

== Career statistics ==
=== International ===
Kazakhstan national team
Year	Apps	Goals
1997	4	2
1998	0	0
1999	0	0
2000	4	1
Total	8	3

Statistics accurate as of 22 March 2017

=== International goals ===
As of match played 4 September 2016

#	Date	Venue	Opponent	Score	Result	Competition	Ref
1.	6 June 1997	Al-Shaab Stadium, Baghdad, Iraq	Iraq	1–1	2–1	1998 FIFA World Cup qualification	
2.	11 June 1997	Railway Stadium, Lahore, Pakistan	Pakistan	2–0	7–0	1998 FIFA World Cup qualification	
3.	8 April 2000	Al-Sadd Stadium, Doha, Qatar	Pakistan	4–0	4–0	2000 AFC Asian Cup qualification	
