= Fawaz Al-Ahmad =

Kuwaiti footballer

Fawaz Bakhit
Personal information
- Date of birth: 9 November 1969 (age 56)
- Place of birth: Kuwait
- Position: Midfielder

Senior career*
Years	Team	Apps	(Gls)
1986–2005	Kazma	-	(-)

International career
1992–2003	Kuwait	40	(6)
- * Club domestic league appearances and goals

Fawaz Bakhit Al Ahmad is a Kuwaiti former footballer who played as a midfielder. He played for Kuwait in the 1996 Asian Cup. He also played for Kazma.
