= Waleed Bakhit Maayof =

Qatari footballer (born 1972)

Personal information
- Date of birth: 29 November 1972 (age 53)

International career
Years	Team	Apps	(Gls)
- Qatar

Waleed Bakhit Maayof (born 29 November 1972) is a Qatari footballer. He competed in the men's tournament at the 1992 Summer Olympics.
