= Haidar Najim =

Iraqi association football player

Personal information
- Full name: Haidar Najim Abdullah
- Date of birth: 1 July 1967 (age 59)
- Place of birth: Iraq
- Position: Forward

Team information
- Current team: Naft Al-Wasat (Assist. coach)

Senior career*
Years	Team	Apps	(Gls)
1988–1996	Al-Najaf		
1996	Al-Karkh		
1996	Qatar		
1997–1998	Al-Najaf		
1998–2000	Tadamon Sour		
2000–2002	Al-Najaf		

International career
1997–2001	Iraq		

Managerial career
- 2008–2009: Al-Talaba (Assist. coach)
- 2009–2010: Karbala (Assist. coach)
- 2010–2013: Al-Najaf (Assist. coach)
- 2013–2015: Naft Al-Wasat (Assist. coach)
- 2015–2016: Iraq U23 (Assist. coach)
- 2016: Iraq (Assist. coach)
- 2016–2017: Naft Al-Wasat (Assist. coach)
- 2015–2020: Iraq U23 (Assist. coach)
- 2020–2020: Al-Shorta SC (Assist. coach)
- 2021–: Naft Al-Wasat (Assist. coach)
- * Club domestic league appearances and goals

Haidar Najim Abdullah (Arabic: حَيْدَر نَجْم عَبْد الله; born 1 July 1967) is a former Iraqi football forward who played for Iraq in the 1998 FIFA World Cup qualification and 2002 FIFA World Cup qualification. He played for the national team between 1997 and 2001.

== Honours ==
=== Club ===
Al-Najaf

- Baghdad Championship: 1997–98

== Career statistics ==
=== International goals ===
Scores and results list Iraq's goal tally first.

No	Date	Venue	Opponent	Score	Result	Competition
1.	29 June 1997	Central Stadium, Almaty	Kazakhstan	1–0	1–3	1998 FIFA World Cup qualification
2.	14 April 2001	Al-Shaab Stadium, Baghdad	Nepal	5–1	9–1	2002 FIFA World Cup qualification
