= Abdullah Al-Dosari =

Saudi Arabian footballer

Personal information
- Full name: Abdullah Saleh Al-Dosari
- Date of birth: 1 November 1969 (age 56)
- Place of birth: Saudi Arabia
- Height: 1.75 m (5 ft 9 in)
- Position: Right back

Senior career*
Years	Team	Apps	(Gls)
1987-2002	Ettifaq FC	332	(21)

International career
1988–2001	Saudi Arabia	62	(1)
- * Club domestic league appearances and goals

Abdullah Saleh Al-Dosari (Arabic: عبد الله الدوسري; born 1 November 1969) is a Saudi Arabian former football defender who played for Saudi Arabia in the 1994 FIFA World Cup. He also played for Ettifaq FC.
