= Loay Taleb =

Syrian footballer

Louay Taleb
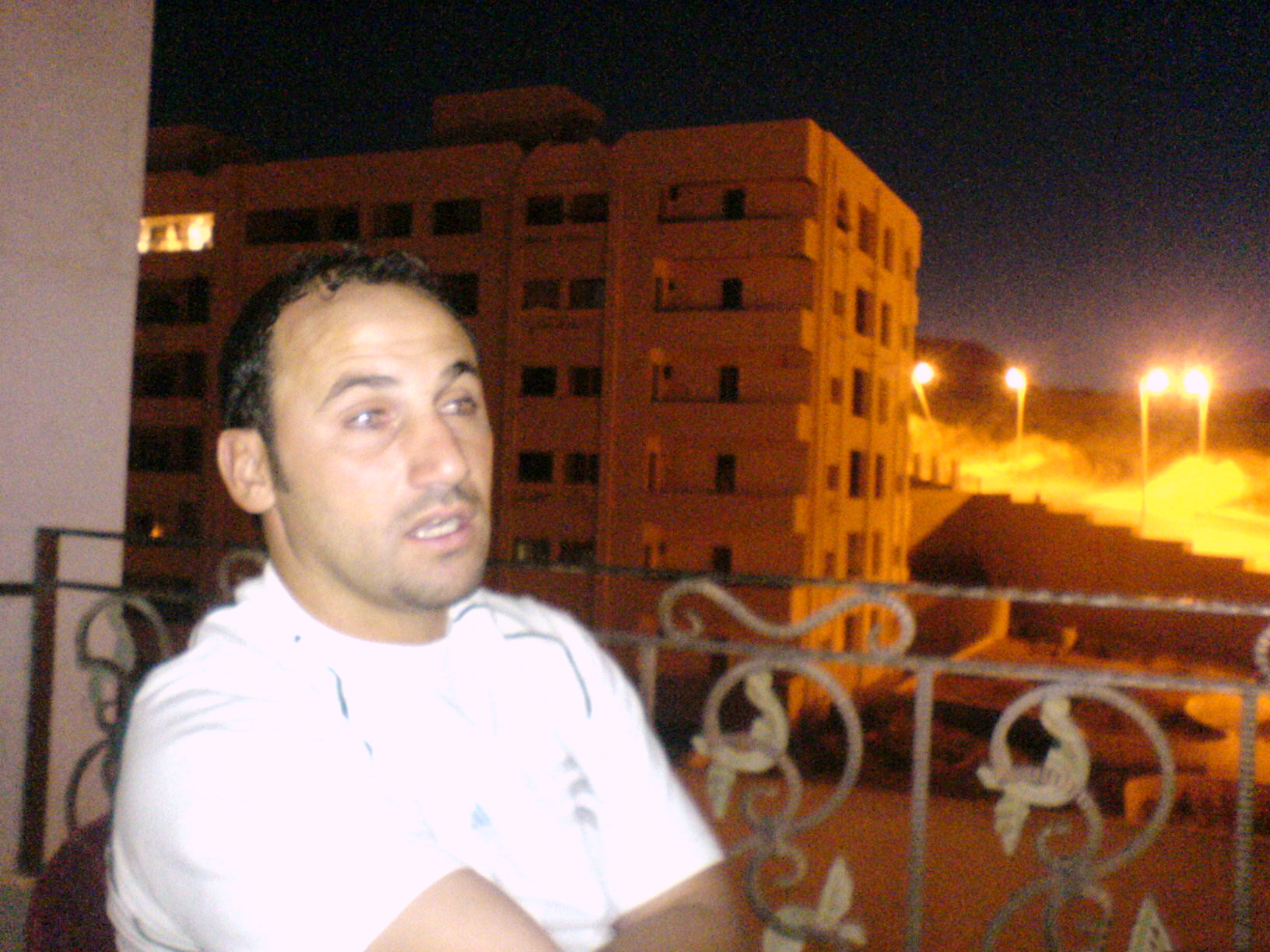
- Louay Taleb in August 2007

Personal information
- Date of birth: 9 August 1975 (age 51)
- Place of birth: Damascus, Syria
- Height: 1.76 m (5 ft 9 1/2 in)
- Position: Midfielder

Senior career*
Years	Team	Apps	(Gls)
1996–2002	Al-Wahda	104	(21)

International career
1996–2000	Syria	14	(9)

Managerial career
- 2002–2009: Al-Wahda (Asst. Coach)
- Feb 2009–May 2009: Al-Faisaly (Asst. Coach)
- * Club domestic league appearances and goals

Louay Taleb (Arabic: لُؤَيّ طَالِب; born August 9, 1975, in Damascus, Syria) is a retired Syrian football player. He ended his career as a player at Al-Wahda in 2002 and became one of the assistant coaches there. He moved to Al-Faisaly club in Jordan to be the assistant coach there from February 2009 until his contract ended in May 2009.

== Early life ==
Louay Taleb was born on 9 August 1975 in the Midan district of Damascus, Syria, the youngest child of Khajo Shasheet, a cook, and Sayah Taleb, a prominent Syrian businessman at the time. His father died of a smoking related illness when Louay was very young.

== Football career ==
Taleb had a flourishing national and international 6-year career as a player for Al-Wahda and the Syria national football team. With significant goals and great defensive work, his club team and country team were getting very close to big accomplishments. His best season with Al-Wahda was his 1999–2000 season when he scored 7 goals, including the winning goal in an important match.

== Retirement and coaching ==
In late 2002, Taleb decided he would rather retire as a player and become an assistant coach for Al-Wahda club in his hometown of Damascus. In the 2003–2004 season, Al-Wahda topped the Syrian Premier League and won the Syrian cup. He remained the assistant coach there until the year 2009 when he received an offer to move to Al-Faisaly club of Jordan. He coached there along with Nizar Mahrous until their contract ended in May 2009. He then retired and decided to become a football coach at a private school in Damascus, then he moved to the U.S. and started coaching for clubs and he continues to today.
