= Nihad Al Boushi =

Syrian footballer (born 1973)

Personal information
- Date of birth: 8 March 1973 (age 53)
- Place of birth: Syria
- Height: 1.75 m (5 ft 9 in)
- Position: Midfielder

Senior career*
Years	Team	Apps	(Gls)
- Al-Ittihad SC Aleppo
1996–1997	FC Krylia Sovetov Samara	13	(0)
1998–2003	Al-Ittihad SC Aleppo		

International career
- Syria
- * Club domestic league appearances and goals

Nihad Al Boushi (Arabic: نهاد البوشي; born 8 March 1973) is a former Syrian football midfielder who played for Syria in the 1996 Asian Cup.

== Personal life ==
His brother, Mouhanad, is also a football player.
