= Shuhrat Jabborov =

Tajikistani footballer

Personal information
- Full name: Shuhrat Jabborov
- Date of birth: 30 November 1973 (age 52)
- Height: 1.74 m (5 ft 9 in)
- Position: Forward

Senior career*
Years	Team	Apps	(Gls)
1997	Chilanzar Tashkent	29	(10)
1998–1999	Sogdiana Jizzakh	55	(16)
2000–2002	Dinamo Samarqand	72	(16)
2002	Mashʼal Mubarek	9	(3)
2003–2004	Dinamo Samarqand	30	(5)
2005	Regar-TadAZ		
2007	Hima Dushanbe		
2009–2013	Regar-TadAZ		

International career^{‡}
1996–2004	Tajikistan	19	(4)
- * Club domestic league appearances and goals as of 11 September 2015 ‡ National team caps and goals as of 11 September 2015

Shuhrat Jabborov (born 30 November 1973) is a retired Tajikistan footballer who played as a forward.

== Career statistics ==
=== International ===
Tajikistan
Year	Apps	Goals
1996	2	0
1997	4	3
1998	0	0
1999	3	0
2000	2	1
2001	0	0
2002	0	0
2003	0	0
2004	0	0
2005	0	0
2006	4	0
2007	4	0
Total	19	4

Statistics accurate as of match played 11 September 2015

== International goals ==
No.	Date	Venue	Opponent	Score	Result	Competition
1.	4 May 1997	Pamir Stadium, Dushanbe, Tajikistan	Vietnam	3–0	4–0	1998 FIFA World Cup qualification
2.	4 May 1997	Pamir Stadium, Dushanbe, Tajikistan	Vietnam	4–0	4–0	1998 FIFA World Cup qualification
3.	22 June 1997	Pamir Stadium, Dushanbe, Tajikistan	Turkmenistan	2–0	5–0	1998 FIFA World Cup qualification
4.	26 November 2000	Takhti Stadium, Tabriz, Iran	Guam	13–0	16–0	2002 FIFA World Cup qualification

== Honours ==
Regar-TadAZ

- Tajik Cup (3): 2005, 2011, 2012
