= Hani Al-Saqer =

Kuwaiti footballer

Hani Al Saqer
Personal information
- Date of birth: 8 January 1973 (age 53)
- Place of birth: Kuwait
- Position: Forward

Senior career*
Years	Team	Apps	(Gls)
1990–2003	Al Qadesiya		

International career
1996–2002	Kuwait	34	(4)

Managerial career
- 2019–2020: Yarmook
- 2021–2022: Khaitan
- * Club domestic league appearances and goals

Hani Al Saqer is a Kuwaiti former football forward who represented his county in the 1996 Asian Cup. He also played for Al Qadesiya.
