= Jasem Al-Huwaidi =

Kuwaiti footballer

Jasem Al Huwaidi
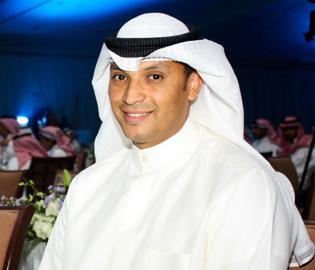
- Jasem Al Huwaidi in 2010

Personal information
- Full name: Jasem Mohammed Ibrahim Al Huwaidi
- Date of birth: 28 October 1972 (age 54)
- Place of birth: Kuwait City, Kuwait
- Height: 1.91 m (6 ft 3 in)
- Position: Striker

Senior career*
Years	Team	Apps	(Gls)
1991–1998	Al-Salmiya	40	(37)
1998–1999	Al-Shabab		(6)
1999–2000	Al-Hilal		(3)
2000–2001	Al-Salmiya		
2001–2002	Al-Rayyan	9	(5)
2002–2004	Al-Salmiya		

International career
1992–2009	Kuwait	83	(63)
- * Club domestic league appearances and goals

Jasem Mohammed Ibrahim Al Huwaidi (Arabic: جَاسِم مُحَمَّد إِبْرَاهِيم الْهُوَيْدِيّ; born 28 October 1972 in Kuwait City) is a retired Kuwaiti footballer who played as a forward.

== Career ==
He was part of the Kuwaiti national football team that reached 24th place in the FIFA ranking. He was instrumental in Kuwait getting a silver medal in the Asian Games, winning two Gulf Cups and coming in third in the Arab Cup. Al Houwaidi won the world's top scorer award in 1998.

He competed for Kuwait at the 1992 Summer Olympics in Barcelona.

== International goals ==
Results list Kuwait's goal tally first.

#	Date	Venue	Opponent	Score	Result	Competition
1.	30 November 1992	Doha	Oman	1	2–1	Gulf Cup
2.	19 April 1993	Singapore	Australia	1	3–1	Friendly
3.	3 May 1993	Kuala Lumpur	Macau	3	10–1	1994 FIFA World Cup qualification
6.	16 May 1993	Riyadh	Macau	2	8–0	1994 FIFA World Cup qualification
8.	19 November 1996	Kuwait City	Syria	2	2–2	Friendly
10.	7 December 1996	Abu Dhabi	United Arab Emirates	2	2–3	1996 AFC Asian Cup
12.	10 December 1996	Abu Dhabi	South Korea	1	2–0	1996 AFC Asian Cup
13.	15 December 1996	Al Ain	Japan	2	2–0	1996 AFC Asian Cup
15.	21 December 1996	Abu Dhabi	Iran	1	1–1 (Note: Kuwait lost 2–3 after the penalty shootout.)	1996 AFC Asian Cup
16.	8 May 1997	Kuwait City	Lebanon	1	2–0	1998 FIFA World Cup qualification
17.	5 June 1997	Kuwait City	Singapore	1	4–0	1998 FIFA World Cup qualification
18.	19 September 1997	Doha	Qatar	1	2–0	1998 FIFA World Cup qualification
19.	26 September 1997	Kuwait City	Iran	1	1–1	1998 FIFA World Cup qualification
20.	10 October 1997	Kuwait City	China	1	1–2	1998 FIFA World Cup qualification
21.	14 April 1998	Tabriz	Iran	1	1–1	Friendly
22.	26 September 1998	Doha	Syria	1	4–0	1998 Arab Nations Cup
23.	2 November 1998	Manama	Qatar	5	6–2	Gulf Cup
28.	9 November 1998	Manama	Oman	2	5–0	Gulf Cup
30.	12 November 1998	Manama	United Arab Emirates	2	4–1	Gulf Cup
32.	1 December 1998	Chiang Mai	Mongolia	4	11–0	1998 Asian Games
36.	3 December 1998	Chiang Mai	Uzbekistan	1	3–3	1998 Asian Games
37.	7 December 1998	Bangkok	United Arab Emirates	3	5–0	1998 Asian Games
40.	15 February 1999	Kuwait City	Iran	1	1–2	Ciao February Cup
41.	31 January 2000	Kuwait City	Syria	1	4–0	Friendly
42.	4 February 2000	Kuwait City	Iran	1	1–1	Friendly
43.	10 February 2000	Kuwait City	Turkmenistan	2	6–1	2000 AFC Asian Cup qualification
45.	14 February 2000	Kuwait City	Bhutan	5	20–0	2000 AFC Asian Cup qualification
50.	30 September 2000	Kuwait City	Thailand	1	3–2	Friendly
51.	16 October 2000	Tripoli	South Korea	1	1–0	2000 AFC Asian Cup
52.	24 October 2000	Beirut	Saudi Arabia	1	2–3	2000 AFC Asian Cup
53.	17 January 2001	Doha	Syria	1	2–0	Friendly
54.	23 January 2001	Bangkok	Thailand	1	4–5	Friendly
55.	3 February 2001	Singapore	Bahrain	1	2–1	2002 FIFA World Cup qualification
56.	9 February 2001	Singapore	Kyrgyzstan	1	3–0	2002 FIFA World Cup qualification
57.	15 February 2001	Kuwait City	Finland	2	4–3	Friendly
59.	24 February 2001	Kuwait City	Kyrgyzstan	1	2–0	2002 FIFA World Cup qualification
60.	16 January 2002	Riyadh	Saudi Arabia	1	1–1	Gulf Cup
61.	19 January 2002	Riyadh	Oman	1	1–3	Gulf Cup
62.	29 January 2002	Riyadh	United Arab Emirates	2	2–1	Gulf Cup

== Individual ==
- IFFHS World's Top Goal Scorer: 1998
