= 2000 AFC Asian Cup squads =

Squad lists of 2000 AFC Asian Cup national teams

The 2000 AFC Asian Cup is an international football tournament that was held in Lebanon from 12 to 29 October 2000. The 12 national teams involved in the tournament were required to register a squad of minimum 18 players and maximum 23 players, minimum three of whom must be goalkeepers. Only players in these squads were eligible to take part in the tournament.

The position listed for each player is per the official squad list published by AFC. The age listed for each player is on 12 October 2000, the first day of the tournament. The numbers of caps and goals listed for each player do not include any matches played after the start of tournament. The nationality for each club reflects the national association (not the league) to which the club is affiliated. A flag is included for coaches that are of a different nationality than their own national team.

== Group A ==
=== Iran ===
Head coach: Jalal Talebi

No.	Pos.	Player	Date of birth (age)	Caps	Club
1	GK	Mehdi Vaezi	19 January 1975 (aged 25)		(Iran) Bahman
2	MF	Mehdi Mahdavikia	24 July 1977 (aged 23)		(Germany) Hamburger SV
3	DF	Mehdi Hasheminasab	27 January 1973 (aged 27)		(Iran) Esteghlal
5	DF	Sohrab Bakhtiarizadeh	11 September 1974 (aged 26)		(Turkey) Erzurumspor
6	MF	Karim Bagheri	24 February 1974 (aged 26)		(England) Charlton Athletic
7	MF	Hamed Kavianpour	1 December 1978 (aged 21)		(Iran) Persepolis
8	MF	Sattar Hamedani	6 June 1974 (aged 26)		(Iran) Esteghlal
9	MF	Hamid Reza Estili	1 April 1967 (aged 33)		(Iran) Persepolis
10	FW	Ali Daei (captain)	21 March 1969 (aged 31)		(Germany) Hertha BSC
11	FW	Khodadad Azizi	22 June 1971 (aged 29)		(United States) San Jose Earthquakes
12	GK	Parviz Broumand	11 September 1972 (aged 28)		(Iran) Esteghlal
13	MF	Davoud Seyed Abbasi	20 February 1977 (aged 23)		(Iran) Fajr Sepasi
14	MF	Mohammad Navazi	5 September 1974 (aged 26)		(Iran) Esteghlal
15	MF	Esmail Halali	13 August 1973 (aged 27)		(Iran) Persepolis
16	FW	Vahid Hashemian	21 July 1976 (aged 24)		(Germany) Hamburger SV
17	MF	Alireza Emamifar	16 September 1974 (aged 26)		(Iran) Persepolis
18	MF	Dariush Yazdani	6 June 1977 (aged 23)		(Iran) Esteghlal
19	MF	Ali Karimi	8 November 1978 (aged 21)		(Iran) Persepolis
20	DF	Behrouz Rahbarifar	17 July 1971 (aged 29)		(Iran) Persepolis
22	GK	Davoud Fanaei	19 February 1976 (aged 24)		(Iran) Persepolis
25	MF	Mehrdad Minavand	30 November 1975 (aged 24)		(Austria) Sturm Graz
28	DF	Mohammad Reza Mahdavi	17 December 1972 (aged 27)		(Iran) Esteghlal

=== Iraq ===
Head coach: (Federal Republic of Yugoslavia) Milan Živadinović

No.	Pos.	Player	Date of birth (age)	Caps	Club
1	GK	Hashim Khamis	17 July 1969 (aged 31)		(Iraq) Al-Quwa Al-Jawiya
2	DF	Haidar Mahmoud	19 September 1973 (aged 27)		(Iraq) Al-Zawraa
3	DF	Sadiq Saadoun	12 June 1972 (aged 28)		(Iraq) Al-Talaba
4	DF	Jabbar Hashim	1 July 1970 (aged 30)		(Iraq) Al-Quwa Al-Jawiya
5	DF	Hamza Hadi	20 November 1969 (aged 30)		(Iraq) Al-Quwa Al-Jawiya
6	DF	Ziyad Tariq	2 August 1977 (aged 23)		(Iraq) Al-Shorta
7	MF	Adnan Mohammad	1 July 1973 (aged 27)		(Lebanon) Shabab Al-Sahel
8	FW	Husham Mohammed	10 May 1974 (aged 26)		(Iraq) Al-Zawraa
9	FW	Ahmed Abdul-Jabar	8 January 1978 (aged 22)		(Iraq) Al-Zawraa
10	MF	Abbas Obeid	10 December 1973 (aged 26)		(South Korea) Pohang Steelers
11	FW	Sabah Jeayer	26 May 1970 (aged 30)		(Iraq) Al-Talaba
12	GK	Emad Hashim	10 February 1969 (aged 31)		(Iraq) Al-Shorta
13	MF	Abbas Rahim	1 January 1979 (aged 21)		(Iraq) Al-Zawraa
14	MF	Essam Hamad	22 October 1973 (aged 26)		(Iraq) Al-Zawraa
15	FW	Qahtan Chathir	20 July 1973 (aged 27)		(Iraq) Al-Karkh
16	DF	Haidar Obeid	2 April 1979 (aged 21)		(Iraq) Al-Karkh
17	MF	Ahmed Hussein	1 July 1977 (aged 23)		(Iraq) Al-Zawraa
18	DF	Ahmed Kadhim	1 July 1976 (aged 24)		(Iraq) Al-Zawraa
20	FW	Hussam Fawzi	3 September 1974 (aged 26)		(United Arab Emirates) Dubai
21	GK	Amer Abdul-Wahab	17 April 1969 (aged 31)		(Iraq) Al-Zawraa
22	DF	Mahir Habib	19 June 1977 (aged 23)		(Iraq) Al-Shorta
25	MF	Abdul-Wahab Abu Al-Hail	21 December 1976 (aged 23)		(Lebanon) Akhaa Ahli Aley

=== Lebanon ===
Head coach: (Croatia) Josip Skoblar

No.	Pos.	Player	Date of birth (age)	Caps	Club
1	GK	Ali Fakih	12 April 1967 (aged 33)		(Lebanon) Sagesse
2	DF	Gurgen Engibaryan	10 March 1964 (aged 36)		(Lebanon) Homenmen
3	DF	Youssef Mohamad	1 July 1980 (aged 20)		(Lebanon) Safa
4	MF	Jadir Morgenstern	29 May 1974 (aged 26)		(Lebanon) Al-Ansar
5	MF	Ahmad El Naamani	12 October 1979 (aged 21)		(Lebanon) Safa
6	MF	Jamal Taha (captain)	23 November 1966 (aged 33)		(Lebanon) Al-Ansar
7	MF	Abbas Chahrour	1 January 1972 (aged 28)		(Lebanon) Nejmeh
8	DF	Fouad Hijazi	27 June 1973 (aged 27)		(Lebanon) Sagesse
9	FW	Haitham Zein	1 June 1979 (aged 21)		(Lebanon) Tadamon Sour
10	MF	Moussa Hojeij	8 June 1974 (aged 26)		(Lebanon) Nejmeh
11	FW	Newton	24 July 1976 (aged 24)		(Lebanon) Al-Ansar
12	FW	Gilberto	27 August 1975 (aged 25)		(Lebanon) Akhaa Ahli Aley
13	DF	Marcílio	5 November 1976 (aged 23)		(Lebanon) Akhaa Ahli Aley
14	FW	Vardan Ghazaryan	10 January 1969 (aged 31)		(Lebanon) Homenetmen
15	MF	Luís Fernandes	3 January 1971 (aged 29)		(Lebanon) Shabab Al-Sahel
17	DF	Faisal Antar	20 December 1978 (aged 21)		(Lebanon) Tadamon Sour
18	DF	Mohamad Halawi	5 April 1977 (aged 23)		(Lebanon) Nejmeh
19	MF	Michael Reda	30 December 1972 (aged 27)		(Australia) Melbourne Knights
20	MF	Roda Antar	12 September 1980 (aged 20)		(Lebanon) Tadamon Sour
21	GK	Wahid El Fattal	6 January 1978 (aged 22)		(Lebanon) Nejmeh
22	GK	Ahmad Sakr	7 April 1970 (aged 30)		(Lebanon) Homenmen
23	MF	Nasrat Al Jamal	1 July 1980 (aged 20)		(Lebanon) Tadamon Sour

=== Thailand ===
Head coach: (England) Peter Withe

No.	Pos.	Player	Date of birth (age)	Caps	Club
1	GK	Wirat Wangchan	16 March 1975 (aged 25)		(Thailand) Sinthana
2	DF	Tanongsak Prajakkata	25 June 1976 (aged 24)		(Thailand) BEC Tero Sasana
3	DF	Niweat Siriwong	18 July 1977 (aged 23)		(Singapore) Gombak United
5	DF	Choketawee Promrut	16 March 1975 (aged 25)		(Thailand) Thai Farmers Bank
6	MF	Anurak Srikerd	15 January 1975 (aged 25)		(Thailand) BEC Tero Sasana
7	DF	Chukiat Noosarung	25 June 1971 (aged 29)		(Thailand) Raj Pracha-Nonthaburi
8	MF	Therdsak Chaiman	29 September 1973 (aged 27)		(Thailand) BEC Tero Sasana
10	MF	Tawan Sripan	13 December 1971 (aged 28)		(Singapore) Sembawang Rangers
11	MF	Thawatchai Damrong-Ongtrakul	25 June 1974 (aged 26)		(Singapore) Sembawang Rangers
12	MF	Surachai Jaturapattarapong	20 November 1969 (aged 30)		Stock Exchange of Thailand
14	FW	Worrawoot Srimaka	8 December 1971 (aged 28)		(Thailand) BEC Tero Sasana
15	DF	Witthaya Nabthong	25 November 1970 (aged 29)		(Thailand) BEC Tero Sasana
16	DF	Surachai Jirasirichote	13 October 1970 (aged 29)		(Thailand) Sinthana Bangkok
17	DF	Dusit Chalermsan	22 April 1970 (aged 30)		(Thailand) BEC Tero Sasana
18	GK	Pansa Meesatham	26 August 1974 (aged 26)		(Thailand) BEC Tero Sasana
19	FW	Pipat Thonkanya	4 January 1979 (aged 21)		(Thailand) UCOM Rajapacha
20	FW	Seksan Piturat	2 January 1976 (aged 24)		(Thailand) BEC Tero Sasana
22	GK	Kittisak Rawangpa	3 January 1975 (aged 25)		(Thailand) Sinthana Bangkok
23	FW	Sutee Suksomkit	5 June 1980 (aged 20)		(Thailand) Thai Farmers Bank
24	DF	Thanunchai Baribarn	3 October 1972 (aged 28)		(Thailand) Sinthana Bangkok
25	DF	Panupong Chimpook	25 November 1976 (aged 23)		(Thailand) Sinthana Bangkok

== Group B ==
=== China ===
Head coach: (Federal Republic of Yugoslavia) Bora Milutinović

No.	Pos.	Player	Date of birth (age)	Caps	Club
1	GK	Ou Chuliang	26 August 1968 (aged 32)	18	(China) Yunnan Hongta
2	DF	Zhang Enhua	28 April 1973 (aged 27)	52	(China) Dalian Shide
4	DF	Wu Chengying	21 April 1975 (aged 25)	18	(China) Shanghai Shenhua
5	DF	Fan Zhiyi	6 November 1969 (aged 30)	80	(England) Crystal Palace F.C.
6	MF	Li Ming	26 January 1971 (aged 29)	54	(China) Dalian Shide
8	MF	Li Tie	18 September 1977 (aged 23)	44	(China) Liaoning Fushun Tegang
9	MF	Ma Mingyu (captain)	4 February 1970 (aged 30)	58	(Italy) Perugia
10	FW	Su Maozhen	30 July 1972 (aged 28)	32	(China) Shandong Luneng
11	FW	Xie Hui	14 February 1975 (aged 25)	3	(Germany) Alemannia Aachen
12	FW	Qu Shengqing	5 June 1975 (aged 25)	8	(China) Liaoning Fushun Tegang
13	DF	Chen Gang	9 March 1972 (aged 28)	6	(China) Qingdao Hainiu
14	DF	Li Weifeng	1 December 1978 (aged 21)	20	(China) Shenzhen Ping'an Kejian
15	MF	Shen Si	1 May 1973 (aged 27)	18	(China) Shanghai Shenhua
16	MF	Xu Yang	6 June 1974 (aged 26)	5	(China) Beijing Guoan
18	MF	Li Xiaopeng	20 June 1975 (aged 25)	2	(China) Shandong Luneng Taishan
19	MF	Qi Hong	3 June 1976 (aged 24)	11	(China) Shanghai Shenhua
20	FW	Yang Chen	17 January 1974 (aged 26)	12	(Germany) Eintracht Frankfurt
21	DF	Xu Yunlong	17 February 1979 (aged 21)	5	(China) Beijing Guoan
22	GK	Jiang Jin	17 October 1968 (aged 31)	23	(China) Tianjin Teda Dingxin
23	GK	Fu Bin	6 May 1969 (aged 31)	2	(China) Chongqing Longxin
27	MF	Shao Jiayi	10 April 1980 (aged 20)	1	(China) Beijing Guoan
29	MF	Huang Yong	26 May 1978 (aged 22)	15	(China) Bayi Football Team

=== Indonesia ===
Head coach: (Indonesia) Nandar Iskandar

No.	Pos.	Player	Date of birth (age)	Caps	Club
1	GK	Hendro Kartiko	24 April 1973 (aged 27)		(Indonesia) PSM Makassar
3	DF	Aji Santoso (captain)	6 April 1970 (aged 30)		(Indonesia) PSM Makassar
4	DF	Ismed Sofyan	28 August 1979 (aged 21)		(Indonesia) Persiraja Banda Aceh
5	DF	Bejo Sugiantoro	2 April 1977 (aged 23)		(Indonesia) Persebaya Surabaya
6	DF	Eko Purjianto	1 February 1976 (aged 24)		(Indonesia) Pelita Jaya
7	MF	I Putu Gede	1 December 1973 (aged 26)		(Indonesia) Arema Malang
8	MF	Seto Nurdiyantoro	14 April 1974 (aged 26)		(Indonesia) Pelita Jaya
9	MF	Uston Nawawi	6 September 1978 (aged 22)		(Indonesia) Persebaya Surabaya
10	FW	Kurniawan Dwi Yulianto	3 July 1976 (aged 24)		(Indonesia) PSM Makassar
11	MF	Bima Sakti	23 January 1976 (aged 24)		(Indonesia) PSM Makassar
12	MF	Eduard Ivakdalam	19 December 1974 (aged 25)		(Indonesia) Persipura Jayapura
13	GK	I Komang Putra Adnyana	5 June 1972 (aged 28)		(Indonesia) PSIS Semarang
14	DF	Djet Donald La'ala	13 December 1971 (aged 28)		(Indonesia) PKT Bontang
15	MF	Yaris Riyadi	21 January 1973 (aged 27)		(Indonesia) Persib Bandung
16	MF	Imran Nahumarury	12 November 1978 (aged 21)		(Indonesia) Persita Tangerang
17	GK	Sahari Gultom	2 November 1977 (aged 22)		(Indonesia) PSMS Medan
18	DF	Ardi Warsidi	22 August 1979 (aged 21)		(Indonesia) Persita Tangerang
19	DF	Nur'alim	27 December 1973 (aged 26)		(Indonesia) Persija Jakarta
20	FW	Bambang Pamungkas	10 June 1980 (aged 20)		(Indonesia) Persija Jakarta
21	FW	Rochy Putiray	26 June 1970 (aged 30)		(Hong Kong) Instant-Dict
22	FW	Gendut Doni Christiawan	7 December 1978 (aged 21)		(Indonesia) Sriwijaya
23	DF	Slamet Riyadi	15 November 1981 (aged 18)		(Indonesia) PSMS Medan

=== Kuwait ===
Head coach: (Czech Republic) Dušan Uhrin

No.	Pos.	Player	Date of birth (age)	Caps	Club
1	GK	Shebab Kankune	28 April 1981 (aged 19)		(Kuwait) Kazma
2	DF	Osama Hussain	11 August 1970 (aged 30)		(Kuwait) Al-Arabi
3	DF	Jamal Mubarak	21 March 1974 (aged 26)		(Kuwait) Tadamon
4	DF	Ali Asel	28 September 1976 (aged 24)		(Kuwait) Al-Salmiya
5	DF	Nohair Al-Shammari	12 July 1976 (aged 24)		(Kuwait) Qadsia
6	DF	Husain Al-Khodari	7 February 1972 (aged 28)		(Kuwait) Al-Salmiya
7	MF	Bader Haji	19 December 1967 (aged 32)		(Kuwait) Kazma
8	MF	Saleh Al-Buraiki	27 February 1977 (aged 23)		(Kuwait) Al-Salmiya
9	FW	Bashar Abdullah	12 October 1977 (aged 23)		(Kuwait) Al-Salmiya
10	MF	Naser Al Sohi	24 August 1974 (aged 26)		(Kuwait) Tadamon
11	MF	Abdullah Wabran	7 February 1971 (aged 29)		(Kuwait) Tadamon
12	MF	Falah Farhan	31 January 1975 (aged 25)		(Kuwait)
13	MF	Ahmad Al-Mutairi	13 February 1974 (aged 26)		(Kuwait) Kazma
14	FW	Khalaf Al-Salamah	25 July 1979 (aged 21)		(Kuwait) Al Jahra
15	DF	Salammah Al-Enazy	12 August 1972 (aged 28)		(Kuwait) Al Jahra
16	MF	Naser Al-Omran	14 January 1977 (aged 23)		(Kuwait) Kazma
17	DF	Esam Sakeen	2 July 1971 (aged 29)		(Kuwait) Kazma
18	FW	Ahmed Musa Mirza	30 October 1976 (aged 23)		(Kuwait) Al-Arabi
19	FW	Faraj Laheeb	3 October 1978 (aged 22)		Al Kuwait
20	FW	Jassem Al Houwaidi	28 October 1972 (aged 27)		(Kuwait) Al-Salmiya
21	GK	Falah Al Majidi	13 November 1970 (aged 29)		(Kuwait) Kazma
22	GK	Ahmad Al-Jasem	29 May 1975 (aged 25)		(Kuwait) Al-Arabi

=== South Korea ===
Head coach: (South Korea) Huh Jung-moo

No.	Pos.	Player	Date of birth (age)	Caps	Club
1	GK	Lee Woon-Jae	26 April 1973 (aged 27)	9	(South Korea) Suwon Samsung Bluewings
2	DF	Kang Chul	2 November 1971 (aged 28)	44	(South Korea) Bucheon SK
3	DF	Ha Seok-Ju	20 February 1968 (aged 32)	88	(Japan) Vissel Kobe
4	DF	Park Jin-sub	11 March 1977 (aged 23)	23	(South Korea) Sangmu FC
5	DF	Lee Lim-Saeng	18 November 1971 (aged 28)	24	(South Korea) Bucheon SK
6	MF	Yoo Sang-Chul	6 October 1971 (aged 29)	76	(Japan) Yokohama F. Marinos
7	DF	Kim Tae-young	8 November 1970 (aged 29)	52	(South Korea) Chunnam Dragons
8	MF	Yoon Jung-hwan	16 February 1973 (aged 27)	29	(Japan) Cerezo Osaka
9	FW	Seol Ki-hyeon	8 January 1979 (aged 21)	10	(Belgium) Royal Antwerp
10	MF	Noh Jung-yoon	28 March 1971 (aged 29)	39	(Japan) Cerezo Osaka
11	FW	Lee Dong-gook	29 April 1979 (aged 21)	13	(South Korea) Pohang Steelers
12	DF	Lee Young-pyo	23 April 1977 (aged 23)	16	(South Korea) Anyang LG Cheetahs
15	DF	Lee Min-sung	23 June 1973 (aged 27)	39	(South Korea) Busan I'Cons
16	MF	Kim Sang-sik	17 December 1976 (aged 23)	7	(South Korea) Seongnam Ilhwa Chunma
17	DF	Choi Sung-yong	25 December 1975 (aged 24)	45	(Japan) Vissel Kobe
18	GK	Kim Yong-dae	11 October 1979 (aged 21)	8	(South Korea) Yonsei University
20	DF	Hong Myung-bo (captain)	12 February 1969 (aged 31)	108	(Japan) Kashiwa Reysol
21	GK	Kim Hae-woon	25 December 1973 (aged 26)	0	(South Korea) Seongnam Ilhwa Chunma
23	MF	Park Ji-sung	25 February 1981 (aged 19)	9	(Japan) Kyoto Purple Sanga
24	DF	Park Jae-hong	10 November 1978 (aged 21)	9	(South Korea) Myongji University
28	FW	Choi Chul-woo	30 November 1977 (aged 22)	7	(South Korea) Ulsan Hyundai Horangi
30	DF	Sim Jae-won	11 March 1977 (aged 23)	10	(South Korea) Busan I'Cons

== Group C ==
=== Japan ===
Head coach: (France) Philippe Troussier

No.	Pos.	Player	Date of birth (age)	Caps	Club
1	GK	Yoshikatsu Kawaguchi	15 August 1975 (aged 25)		(Japan) Yokohama F. Marinos
3	DF	Naoki Matsuda	14 March 1977 (aged 23)		(Japan) Yokohama F. Marinos
4	DF	Ryuzo Morioka (captain)	7 October 1975 (aged 25)		(Japan) Shimizu S-Pulse
6	DF	Toshihiro Hattori	23 September 1973 (aged 27)		(Japan) Jubilo Iwata
8	MF	Shigeyoshi Mochizuki	9 July 1973 (aged 27)		(Japan) Kyoto Purple Sanga
9	FW	Akinori Nishizawa	18 June 1976 (aged 24)		(Japan) Cerezo Osaka
10	MF	Hiroshi Nanami	28 November 1972 (aged 27)		(Italy) Venezia
11	MF	Atsuhiro Miura	24 June 1974 (aged 26)		(Japan) Yokohama F. Marinos
12	MF	Hiroaki Morishima	30 April 1972 (aged 28)		(Japan) Cerezo Osaka
13	FW	Atsushi Yanagisawa	27 May 1977 (aged 23)		(Japan) Kashima Antlers
14	MF	Shunsuke Nakamura	24 June 1978 (aged 22)		(Japan) Yokohama F. Marinos
15	MF	Daisuke Oku	7 February 1976 (aged 24)		(Japan) Jubilo Iwata
17	MF	Junichi Inamoto	18 September 1979 (aged 21)		(Japan) Gamba Osaka
19	FW	Tatsuhiko Kubo	18 June 1976 (aged 24)		(Japan) Sanfrecce Hiroshima
20	GK	Daijiro Takakuwa	10 August 1973 (aged 27)		(Japan) Kashima Antlers
21	GK	Takashi Shimoda	28 November 1975 (aged 24)		(Japan) Sanfrecce Hiroshima
22	DF	Yuji Nakazawa	25 February 1978 (aged 22)		(Japan) Verdy Kawasaki
24	MF	Tomokazu Myojin	24 January 1978 (aged 22)		(Japan) Kashiwa Reysol
26	DF	Keiji Kaimoto	26 November 1972 (aged 27)		(Japan) Vissel Kobe
27	FW	Hideaki Kitajima	23 May 1978 (aged 22)		(Japan) Kashiwa Reysol
29	FW	Naohiro Takahara	4 June 1979 (aged 21)		(Japan) Jubilo Iwata
30	MF	Shinji Ono	27 September 1979 (aged 21)		(Japan) Urawa Reds

=== Qatar ===
Head coach: (Bosnia and Herzegovina) Džemal Hadžiabdić

No.	Pos.	Player	Date of birth (age)	Caps	Club
1	GK	Amer Al-Kaabi	1 March 1971 (aged 29)		(Qatar) Al-Ittihad
4	DF	Saoud Fath	16 August 1980 (aged 20)		(Qatar) Al-Ittihad
5	MF	Abdulnasser Al-Obaidly	2 October 1972 (aged 28)		(Qatar) Al-Sadd
6	FW	Dahi Saad Al-Naemi	5 September 1978 (aged 22)		(Qatar) Al-Sadd
7	FW	Abdullah Al-Ishaq	7 December 1976 (aged 23)		(Qatar) Al Ahli
8	DF	Saad Al-Shammari	6 August 1980 (aged 20)		(Qatar) Al-Ittihad
9	FW	Mohammed Salem Al-Enazi	22 November 1976 (aged 23)		(Turkey) Yimpaş Yozgatspor
10	MF	Fahad Al Kuwari	18 August 1973 (aged 27)		(Qatar) Al-Sadd
11	FW	Adel Al Mulla	7 December 1970 (aged 29)		(Qatar) Al-Rayyan
12	DF	Ahmed Khalid Salih			(Qatar)
13	MF	Raed Yaquoub	15 October 1974 (aged 25)		(Qatar) Al-Rayyan
14	MF	Abdulaziz Hassan	27 February 1973 (aged 27)		Qatar SC
15	DF	Yousef Adam	12 September 1972 (aged 28)		(Qatar) Al-Ittihad
16	FW	Mohammed Gholam	8 November 1980 (aged 19)		Qatar SC
17	MF	Jassim Al-Tamimi	14 February 1971 (aged 29)		(Qatar) Al-Sadd
18	MF	Yasser Nazmi	23 September 1973 (aged 27)		Qatar SC
19	MF	Abdul Rahman Mahmoud	27 December 1976 (aged 23)		(Qatar) Al-Sadd
21	GK	Hussain Al-Romaihi	12 September 1974 (aged 26)		Qatar SC
23	MF	Adel Jadoua Ali	13 September 1981 (aged 19)		(Qatar) Al-Sadd
25	FW	Waleed Hamzah	7 September 1982 (aged 18)		(Qatar) Al Arabi
26	GK	Salman Ahmed Al-Ansari	13 June 1983 (aged 17)		(Qatar) Al-Rayyan
27	DF	Meshal Mubarak Budawood	25 February 1982 (aged 18)		Qatar SC

=== Saudi Arabia ===
Head coach: (Czech Republic) Milan Máčala and Nasser Al-Johar

No.	Pos.	Player	Date of birth (age)	Caps	Club
1	GK	Mohammed Al-Deayea	2 August 1972 (aged 28)		(Saudi Arabia) Al Hilal
2	DF	Mohammed Shliya Al-Jahani	28 September 1974 (aged 26)		(Saudi Arabia) Al Ahli
3	DF	Mohammed Al-Khilaiwi	21 August 1971 (aged 29)		(Saudi Arabia) Al-Ittihad
4	DF	Abdullah Zubromawi	15 November 1973 (aged 26)		(Saudi Arabia) Al Ahli
5	DF	Tariq Al-Muwallid	20 July 1980 (aged 20)		(Saudi Arabia) Al-Ittihad
6	MF	Omar Al-Ghamdi	11 April 1979 (aged 21)		(Saudi Arabia) Al Hilal
8	MF	Mohammed Noor	26 February 1978 (aged 22)		(Saudi Arabia) Al-Ittihad
9	FW	Sami Al-Jaber	11 December 1972 (aged 27)		(England) Wolverhampton Wanderers
11	FW	Obeid Al-Dosari	2 October 1975 (aged 25)		(Saudi Arabia) Al Ahli
12	DF	Ahmed Dokhi	25 October 1976 (aged 23)		(Saudi Arabia) Al Hilal
13	DF	Saleh Al-Saqri	23 January 1979 (aged 21)		(Saudi Arabia) Al-Ittihad
14	FW	Marzouk Al-Otaibi	7 November 1975 (aged 24)		(Saudi Arabia) Al-Ittihad
16	DF	Fouzi Al-Shehri	15 May 1980 (aged 20)		(Saudi Arabia) Al Ahli
17	MF	Abdullah Al-Waked	29 September 1975 (aged 25)		(Saudi Arabia) Al-Shabab
18	MF	Nawaf Al-Temyat	28 June 1976 (aged 24)		(Saudi Arabia) Al Hilal
19	FW	Hamzah Idris	8 October 1972 (aged 28)		(Saudi Arabia) Al-Ittihad
20	MF	Mohammad Al-Shalhoub	8 December 1980 (aged 19)		(Saudi Arabia) Al Hilal
21	GK	Tisir Al-Antaif	16 February 1974 (aged 26)		(Saudi Arabia) Al Ahli
22	GK	Mohammed Al-Khojali	15 January 1973 (aged 27)		(Saudi Arabia) Al Nassr
23	MF	Ahmad Khaleel	29 July 1970 (aged 30)		(Saudi Arabia) Al Hilal
28	FW	Abdullah Jumaan Al-Dosari	10 November 1977 (aged 22)		(Saudi Arabia) Al Hilal
29	FW	Talal Al-Meshal	7 June 1978 (aged 22)		(Saudi Arabia) Al Ahli

=== Uzbekistan ===
Head coach: (Armenia) Yuriy Sarkisyan

No.	Pos.	Player	Date of birth (age)	Caps	Club
1	GK	Pavel Bugalo	21 August 1974 (aged 26)		(Russia) Alania Vladikavkaz
2	DF	Bakhtier Ashurmatov	25 March 1976 (aged 24)		(Uzbekistan) Dustlik Tashkent
3	DF	Andrei Fyodorov	19 April 1971 (aged 29)		(Russia) Rubin Kazan
4	MF	Mirdjalal Kasimov	17 September 1970 (aged 30)		(Russia) Kryliya Sovetov
5	DF	Sergey Lushan	14 June 1973 (aged 27)		(Russia) Rostselmash Rostov
7	MF	Otabek Shamuradov	21 July 1974 (aged 26)		(Uzbekistan) Neftchi Farg'ona
8	MF	Nikolay Shirshov	22 June 1974 (aged 26)		(Russia) Rostselmash Rostov
9	MF	Mukhtar Kurbanov	26 January 1975 (aged 25)		(Uzbekistan) Dustlik Tashkent
10	FW	Maksim Shatskikh	30 August 1978 (aged 22)		(Ukraine) Dynamo Kyiv
11	FW	Andrei Akopyants	27 August 1977 (aged 23)		(Russia) Rostselmash Rostov
12	DF	Davranjon Faiziev	14 January 1976 (aged 24)		(Russia) CSKA Moscow
14	DF	Abdimajit Tairov	5 August 1974 (aged 26)		(Uzbekistan) Neftchi Farg'ona
15	MF	Sergey Lebedev	31 January 1969 (aged 31)		(Uzbekistan) Neftchi Farg'ona
16	GK	Nariman Osmanov	17 October 1977 (aged 22)		(Uzbekistan) Temiryulchi Kokand
17	DF	Fevzi Davletov	20 September 1972 (aged 28)		(Uzbekistan) Dustlik Tashkent
18	MF	Alexander Khvostunov	9 January 1974 (aged 26)		(Uzbekistan) Traktor Tashkent
20	GK	Georgiy Zabirov	1 June 1974 (aged 26)		(Uzbekistan) Neftchi Farg'ona
23	FW	Nagmetulla Kutibayev	28 September 1973 (aged 27)		(Uzbekistan) Turon Nukus
24	FW	Umid Isogov	22 December 1978 (aged 21)		(Uzbekistan) Neftchi Farg'ona
25	FW	Rustam Durmonov	28 January 1969 (aged 31)		(Uzbekistan) Neftchi Farg'ona
26	FW	Igor Shkvirin	29 April 1963 (aged 37)		(Uzbekistan) Pakhtakor
27	MF	Shukhratjon Rakhmonqulov	19 April 1971 (aged 29)		(Uzbekistan) Navbahor Namangan
