= Lebanon at the AFC Asian Cup =

National football delegation

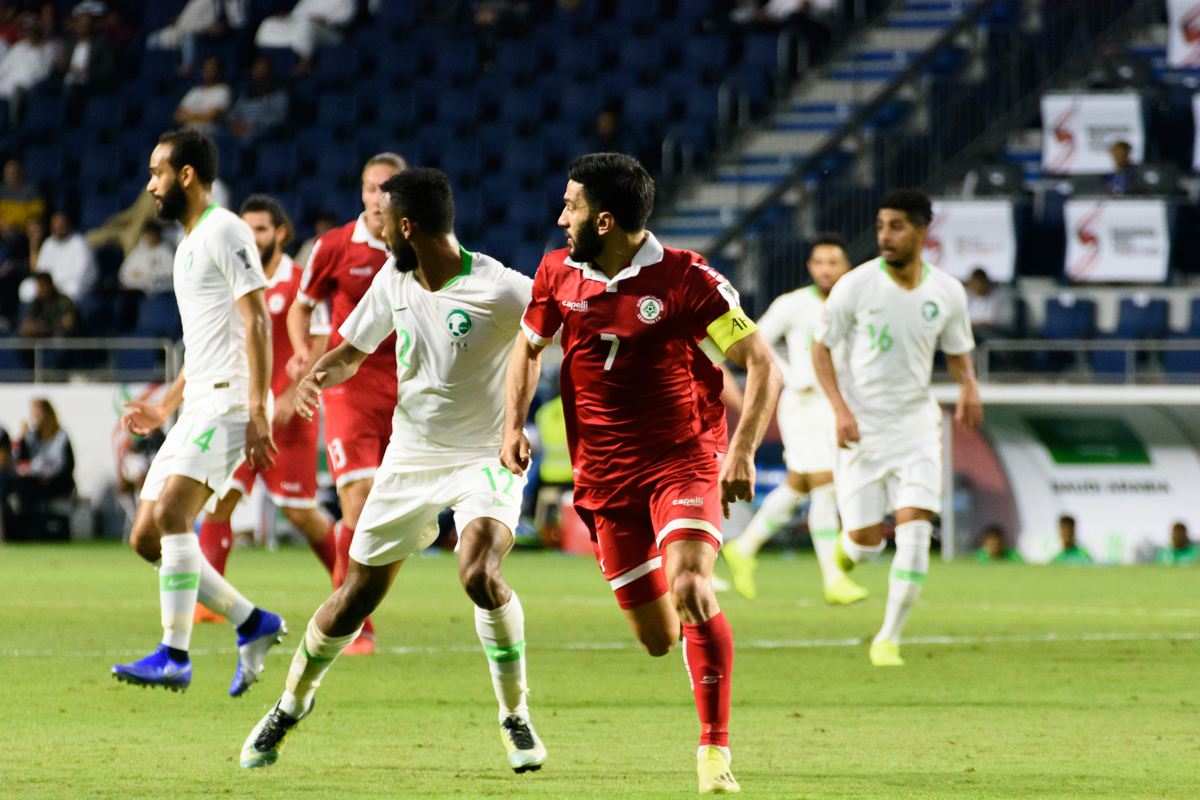
Lebanon during the 2019 Asian Cup match against Saudi Arabia

Lebanon have participated three times at the AFC Asian Cup. Their first participation came in 2000, when they hosted the tournament after healing from the Lebanese Civil War. The 2019 edition was Lebanon's first participation via qualification. Lebanon's most recent appearance was at the 2023 edition.

Historically, Lebanon was considered one of the weakest Asian teams in football, proven by qualification results and lack of participation in the tournament. Also, prior to the 2019 Asian Cup, they were the only Arab country, alongside Yemen, not to qualify to the Asian Cup through regular qualification. From the late 2010s, Lebanon's results improved. After having reached the final round of qualification for the 2014 FIFA World Cup, the team maintained a 15-game unbeaten streak from 2016 to 2018, and qualified for the 2019 Asian Cup undefeated in the third round of qualifications.

Lebanon have never qualified past the group stage in the Asian Cup, with them narrowly missing out on the knock-out stage in 2019 due to the fair play rule; the eliminations in 2000 and 2019 involved teams from Southeast Asia, respectively Thailand and Vietnam.

== AFC Asian Cup record ==
Lebanon were unable to qualify past the first round in their three appearances at the AFC Asian Cup. After a 4–0 defeat to Iran in 2000, Abbas Chahrour scored Lebanon's first goal of the tournament against Iraq in a 2–2 draw. In 2019, after losing against Qatar and Saudi Arabia, Lebanon achieved their first Asian Cup win against North Korea (4–1). However, they missed out on the round of 16 as, in the third-place ranking, Vietnam had accumulated less yellow-cards than Lebanon. The 2023 edition was Lebanon's worst to date, only managing a draw against China and defeats against Tajikistan and hosts Qatar, finishing in last place in their group with one point.

=== 2000 AFC Asian Cup ===
In 2000, Lebanon hosted the Asian Cup despite concerns by FIFA regarding the stadiums' conditions. Under coach Josip Skoblar, Lebanon, captained by Jamal Taha, were drawn into Group A alongside Iran, Iraq and Thailand; they finished last in the group with only two points; had Lebanon defeated Thailand in the final game, they would have qualified for the knockout stage as one of the best third-placed teams.

Pos	Team	Pld	W	D	L	GF	GA	GD	Pts	Qualification
1	Iran	3	2	1	0	6	1	+5	7	Advance to knockout stage
2	Iraq	3	1	1	1	4	3	+1	4	Advance to knockout stage
3	Thailand	3	0	2	1	2	4	−2	2	
4	Lebanon (H)	3	0	2	1	3	7	−4	2	

Source: RSSSF
(H) Hosts
12 October 2000
20:45

Lebanon	0–4	Iran
	Report	Bagheri 19'; Estili 75', 87'; Daei 90+1'

Sports City Stadium, Beirut
Attendance: 52,418
Referee: Lu Jun (China)

15 October 2000
19:45

Lebanon	2–2	Iraq
Chahrour 28'; Hojeij 76'	Report	Jeayer 5', 22'

Sports City Stadium, Beirut
Attendance: 30,000
Referee: Kim Young-Joo (South Korea)

18 October 2000
19:30

Lebanon	1–1	Thailand
Fernandes 83'	Report	Sakesan 58'

Sports City Stadium, Beirut
Attendance: 50,000
Referee: Lu Jun (China)

=== 2019 AFC Asian Cup ===
On 9 January 2019, Lebanon played their first game against Qatar. In the 37th minute of play, Ali Hamam scored a goal for Lebanon only for it to be disallowed for a dubious foul on a Qatari player. In the second half, two goals by the opposition without reply gave them all three points from the encounter. Three days later, Lebanon lost to Saudi Arabia 2–0, sentencing Lebanon to their second defeat in the tournament. In the final group stage game, played on 17 January against North Korea, Lebanon won their first Asian Cup game 4–1 with goals by Felix Michel Melki, Hassan Maatouk and a brace by Hilal El-Helwe. However, this was not enough to qualify Lebanon to the knock-out stages, as they lost out to Vietnam in the third-place ranking on the fairplay rule.

Pos	Team	Pld	W	D	L	GF	GA	GD	Pts	Qualification
1	Qatar	3	3	0	0	10	0	+10	9	Advance to knockout stage
2	Saudi Arabia	3	2	0	1	6	2	+4	6	Advance to knockout stage
3	Lebanon	3	1	0	2	4	5	−1	3	
4	North Korea	3	0	0	3	1	14	−13	0	

Source: AFC
9 January 2019
20:00

Qatar	2–0	Lebanon
Al-Rawi 65'; Ali 79'	Report

Hazza bin Zayed Stadium, Al Ain
Attendance: 7,847
Referee: Ma Ning (China PR)

12 January 2019
20:00

Lebanon	0–2	Saudi Arabia
	Report	Al-Muwallad 12'; Al-Mogahwi 67'

Al Maktoum Stadium, Dubai
Attendance: 13,792
Referee: Ali Sabah (Iraq)

17 January 2019
20:00

Lebanon	4–1	North Korea
F. Michel Melki 27'; El-Helwe 65', 90+8'; Maatouk 80' (pen.)	Report	Pak Kwang-ryong 9'

Sharjah Stadium, Sharjah
Attendance: 4,332
Referee: Chris Beath (Australia)

=== 2023 AFC Asian Cup ===
Lebanon played the opening game of the tournament against hosts Qatar on 12 January 2024, in front of 82,490 spectators at Lusail Stadium. Lebanon suffered a 3–0 defeat against the host nation. A subsequent goalless draw with China left Lebanon needing a victory in the final match against Tajikistan to progress. Bassel Jradi of Lebanon secured an early lead in the second half, but the momentum shifted when Kassem El Zein received a red card in the 52nd minute, reducing Lebanon to 10 players. Tajikistan scored twice late in the game, eliminating Lebanon from the competition. Lebanon finished last in their group with only one point.

Pos	Team	Pld	W	D	L	GF	GA	GD	Pts	Qualification
1	Qatar (H)	3	3	0	0	5	0	+5	9	Advance to knockout stage
2	Tajikistan	3	1	1	1	2	2	0	4	Advance to knockout stage
3	China	3	0	2	1	0	1	−1	2	
4	Lebanon	3	0	1	2	1	5	−4	1	

Source: AFC
(H) Hosts
12 January 2024
19:00

Qatar	3–0	Lebanon
Afif 45', 90+6'; Ali 56'	Report

Lusail Stadium, Lusail
Attendance: 82,490
Referee: Alireza Faghani (Iran)

17 January 2024
14:30

Lebanon	0–0	China
	Report

Al Thumama Stadium, Doha
Attendance: 14,137
Referee: Ko Hyung-jin (South Korea)

22 January 2024
18:00

Tajikistan	2–1	Lebanon
Umarbayev 80'; Khamrokulov 90+2'	Report	Jradi 47'

Jassim bin Hamad Stadium, Al Rayyan
Attendance: 11,843
Referee: Mohanad Qasim Sarray (Iraq)

== Overview ==
=== Tournaments ===
Lebanon's Asian Cup record
First Match	Lebanon 0–4 Iran (12 October 2000; Beirut, Lebanon)
Biggest Win	Lebanon 4–1 North Korea (17 January 2019; Sharjah, United Arab Emirates)
Biggest Defeat	Lebanon 0–4 Iran (12 October 2000; Beirut, Lebanon)
Best Result	Group stage in 2000, 2019, and 2023
Worst Result	Group stage in 2000, 2019, and 2023

=== Matches ===
List of AFC Asian Cup matches
Year	Round	Opponent	Score	Result	Record
2000	Group stage	Iran	0–4	Loss	0–0–1
2000	Group stage	Iraq	2–2	Draw	0–1–1
2000	Group stage	Thailand	1–1	Draw	0–2–1
2019	Group stage	Qatar	0–2	Loss	0–2–2
2019	Group stage	Saudi Arabia	0–2	Loss	0–2–3
2019	Group stage	North Korea	4–1	Win	1–2–3
2023	Group stage	Qatar	0–3	Loss	1–2–4
2023	Group stage	China	0–0	Draw	1–3–4
2023	Group stage	Tajikistan	1–2	Loss	1–3–5

== Player records ==
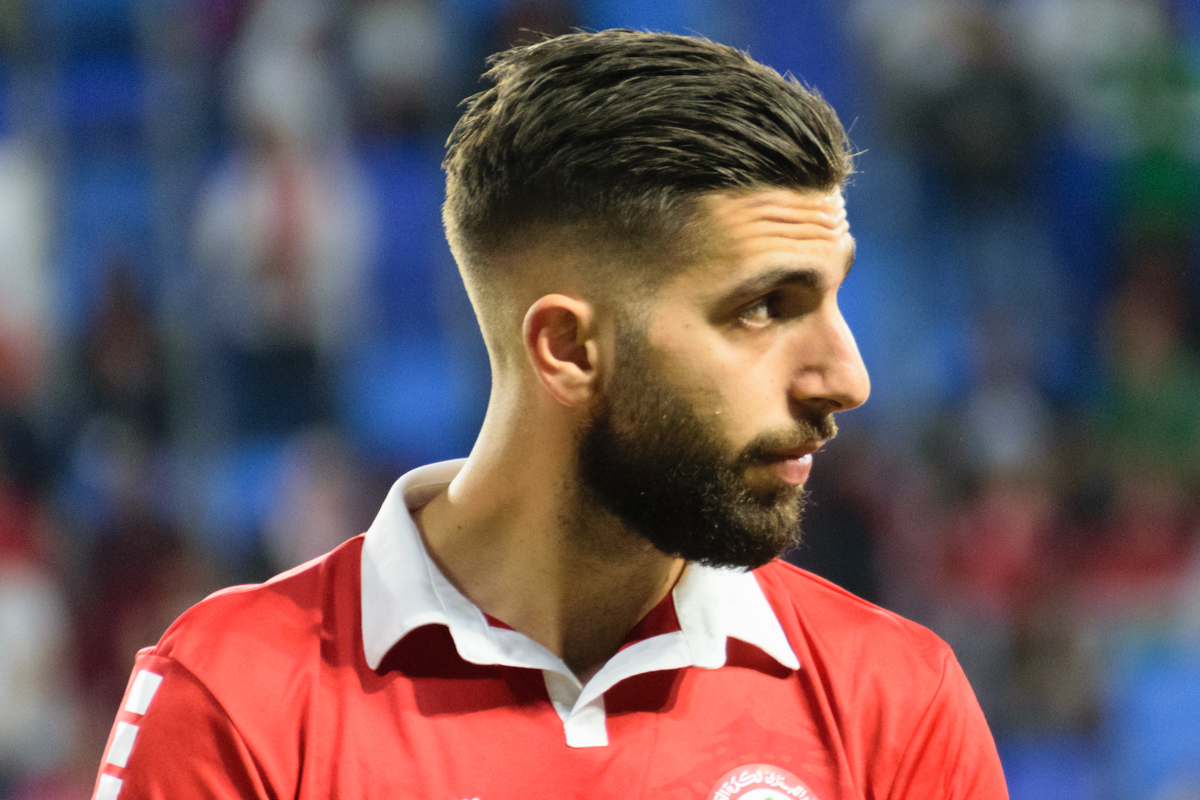
Hilal El-Helwe is Lebanon's top scorer and most-capped player in the competition, with two goals in six games.

=== Most appearances ===
Rank	Player	Matches	Asian Cups
1	Mohamad Haidar	6	2019, 2023
1	Hilal El-Helwe	6	2019, 2023
1	Hassan Maatouk	6	2019, 2023
1	Robert Alexander Melki	6	2019, 2023
5	Bassel Jradi	4	2019, 2023
5	Kassem El Zein	4	2019, 2023
7	18 players	3	2000, 2019, 2023
25	17 players	2	2000, 2019, 2023
42	8 players	1	2000, 2019, 2023

=== Goalscorers ===
Player	Goals	2000	2019	2023
Hilal El-Helwe	2		2	
Abbas Chahrour	1	1		
Luís Fernandes	1	1		
Moussa Hojeij	1	1		
Hassan Maatouk	1		1	
George Felix Melki	1		1	
Bassel Jradi	1			1
Total	8	3	4	1
