= Lebanon national rugby league team match results =

The Lebanon national rugby league team played their first competitive match in 1998. The following list is a complete collection of results for the Lebanon national rugby league team.

== 1990s ==
Date	Home	Score	Away	Competition	Venue	Attendance
1998	Japan	28–52	Lebanon	Friendly	(Japan) Tokyo	
11 November 1999	Italy	16–36	Lebanon	2000 World Cup Qualification, 1999 Mediterranean Cup	(France) Stade Jean–Laffon, Perpignan	
14 November 1999	France	38–24	Lebanon	1999 Mediterranean Cup	(France) Stade des Minimes, Toulouse	1,000
17 November 1999	Lebanon	104–0	Morocco	2000 World Cup Qualification	(France) Parc des Sports, Avignon	
21 November 1999	United States	8–62	Lebanon	2000 World Cup Qualification	(United States) Disney's Wide World of Sports Complex, Orlando	

== 2000s ==
Date	Home	Score	Away	Competition	Venue	Attendance
29 October 2000	Lebanon	0–64	New Zealand	2000 World Cup	(England) Kingsholm Stadium, Gloucester	2,496
2 November 2000	Wales	24–22	Lebanon	2000 World Cup	(Wales) Stradey Park, Llanelli	1,497
5 November 2000	Cook Islands	22–22	Lebanon	2000 World Cup	(Wales) Millennium Stadium, Cardiff	17,612
2 November 2002	Lebanon	36–6	France	2002 Mediterranean Cup	(Lebanon) International Olympic Stadium, Tripoli	9,713
19 October 2003	Lebanon	102–0	Serbia	2003 Mediterranean Cup	(Lebanon) International Olympic Stadium, Tripoli	
22 October 2003	Lebanon	60–0	Morocco	2003 Mediterranean Cup	(Lebanon) Municipal Stadium, Beirut	
25 October 2003	Lebanon	26–18	France	2003 Mediterranean Cup	(Lebanon) International Olympic Stadium, Tripoli	4,000
2 October 2004	Lebanon	64–6	Serbia	2004 Mediterranean Cup	(Lebanon) International Olympic Stadium, Tripoli	
5 October 2004	Lebanon	48–14	Morocco	2004 Mediterranean Cup	(Lebanon) International Olympic Stadium, Tripoli	
9 October 2004	Lebanon	42–12	France	2004 Mediterranean Cup	(Lebanon) International Olympic Stadium, Tripoli	
8 October 2006	Lebanon	36–10	Malta	Phoenician Cup	(Australia) St Mary's Saints Leagues Stadium, Penrith	
28 October 2006	Lebanon	22–8	Russia	2008 World Cup Qualification	(England) New River Stadium, London	300
5 November 2006	Ireland	18–18	Lebanon	2008 World Cup Qualification	(Republic of Ireland) Tolka Park, Dublin	450
27 October 2007	Russia	0–48	Lebanon	2008 World Cup Qualification	(Russia) Nara Stadium, Narofominsk	1,426
2 November 2007	Lebanon	16–16	Ireland	2008 World Cup Qualification	(England) Crown Flatt, Dewsbury	6,812
9 November 2007	Lebanon	50–26	Wales	2008 World Cup Qualification	(England) Halton Stadium, Widnes	753
14 November 2007	Lebanon	16–38	Samoa	2008 World Cup Qualification	(England) Post Office Road, Featherstone	1,323
29 September 2008	Russia	80–0	Lebanon	2008 Euro–Med Challenge	(Russia) Fily Stadium, Moscow	
5 October 2008	Lebanon	20–16	Serbia	2008 Euro–Med Challenge	(Lebanon) Municipal Stadium, Bhamdoun	1,000
24 October 2009	Lebanon	86–0	Italy	2009 European Cup	(Lebanon) International Olympic Stadium, Tripoli	2,100
1 November 2009	Scotland	22–10	Lebanon	2009 European Cup	(Scotland) Hughenden Stadium, Glasgow	1,000
8 November 2009	Ireland	16–40	Lebanon	2009 European Cup	(Wales) Brewery Field, Bridgend	1,608

== 2010s ==
Date	Home	Score	Away	Competition	Venue	Attendance
10 September 2010	Italy	8–16	Lebanon	Friendly	(Italy) Stadio Simone Franchini, Monselice	
27 September 2010	Italy	24–16	Lebanon	Friendly	(Italy) Stadio Plebiscito, Padova	
28 June 2011	Morocco	4–72	Lebanon	Friendly	(Morocco) Berrechid Municipal Stadium, Casablanca	
2 July 2011	Morocco	0–78	Lebanon	Friendly	(Morocco) Berrechid Municipal Stadium, Casablanca	
16 October 2011	Lebanon	96–4	Serbia	2013 World Cup Qualification	(Lebanon) International Olympic Stadium, Tripoli	
22 October 2011	Russia	0–32	Lebanon	2013 World Cup Qualification	(Russia) Vereya Stadium, Vereya	
29 October 2011	Italy	19–19	Lebanon	2013 World Cup Qualification	(Serbia) Makis Stadium, Belgrade	
11 August 2012	Canada	36–18	Lebanon	Friendly	(Canada) Lamport Stadium, Toronto	2,300
7 October 2012	Cook Islands	28–24	Lebanon	Friendly	(Australia) The Crest Stadium, Sydney	2,500
19 October 2013	Fiji	4–34	Lebanon	Friendly	(Australia) Lansvale Stadium, Lansvale, Sydney	
19 October 2014	Fiji	40–22	Lebanon	Friendly	(Australia) Endeavour Field, Cronulla, Sydney	
3 May 2015	Lebanon	34–16	Malta	Phoenician Cup	(Australia) St Mary's Saints Leagues Stadium, Penrith	
25 October 2015	South Africa	12–40	Lebanon	2017 World Cup Qualification	(South Africa) Bosman Stadium, Brakpan	
31 October 2015	South Africa	16–50	Lebanon	2017 World Cup Qualification	(South Africa) Bosman Stadium, Brakpan	
8 May 2016	Cook Islands	30–20	Lebanon	Friendly	(Australia) Belmore Oval, Sydney	2,000
12 June 2016	Italy	22–26	Lebanon	2016 Mediterranean Cup	(Italy) Centro Universitario Sportivo, Catania	
6 May 2017	Lebanon	24–4	Malta	Phoenician Cup	(Australia) New Era Stadium, Cabramatta	
3 June 2017	Lebanon	6–4	Italy	2017 Mediterranean Cup	(Lebanon) Universite Libanais, Beirut	
14 October 2017	Lebanon	32–16	Niue	Friendly	(Australia) Leichhardt Oval, Sydney	
29 October 2017	France	18–29	Lebanon	2017 World Cup	(Australia) Canberra Stadium, Canberra	5,492
4 November 2017	England	29–10	Lebanon	2017 World Cup	(Australia) Sydney Football Stadium, Sydney	10,237
11 November 2017	Australia	34–0	Lebanon	2017 World Cup	(Australia) Sydney Football Stadium, Sydney	21,127
18 November 2017	Tonga	24–22	Lebanon	2017 World Cup	(New Zealand) Christchurch Stadium, Christchurch	8,309
22 June 2019	Fiji	58–14	Lebanon	Friendly	(Australia) Leichhardt Oval, Sydney	8,408

== 2020s ==
Date	Home	Score	Away	Competition	Venue	Attendance
22 June 2022	Lebanon	30–14	Malta	Friendly	(Australia) Belmore Sports Ground, New South Wales	
16 October 2022	New Zealand	34–12	Lebanon	2021 World Cup	(England) Halliwell Jones Stadium, Warrington	
23 October 2022	Lebanon	32–14	Ireland	2021 World Cup	(England) Leigh Sports Village, Leigh	
30 October 2022	Lebanon	74–12	Jamaica	2021 World Cup	(England) Leigh Sports Village, Leigh	
4 November 2022	Australia	48–4	Lebanon	2021 World Cup	(England) Riverside Stadium, Middlesbrough	
13 October 2024	France	C–C (Note: The French Rugby League Federation initially stated that the test series had been cancelled due to the NRL not released any Lebanese players. However the International Rugby League later confirmed this was false and that three key player to the Lebanon team were injured and organisers were concerned about ticket sales with star players absent.)	Lebanon	Two match series friendly	(France) Stade Pierre Balussou, Pamiers	
19 October 2024	France	C–C	Lebanon	Two match series friendly	(France) Stadium Municipal d'Albi, Albi	
4 October 2025	Italy	16–14	Lebanon	Friendly	(Australia) Lidcombe Oval, Sydney	
17 October 2026	Papua New Guinea	42–18	Lebanon	2026 World Cup	(Papua New Guinea) PNG Football Stadium, Port Moresby	11,624
23 October 2026	Tonga	36–0	Lebanon	2026 World Cup	(Australia) Western Sydney Stadium, Sydney	25,065
1 November 2026	France	20–24	Lebanon	2026 World Cup	(Australia) Western Sydney Stadium, Sydney	29,411

== See also ==
- Lebanon national rugby league team
- Lebanese Rugby League Federation
- Rugby league in Lebanon
