= Eldor Shomurodov =

Uzbek footballer (born 1999)

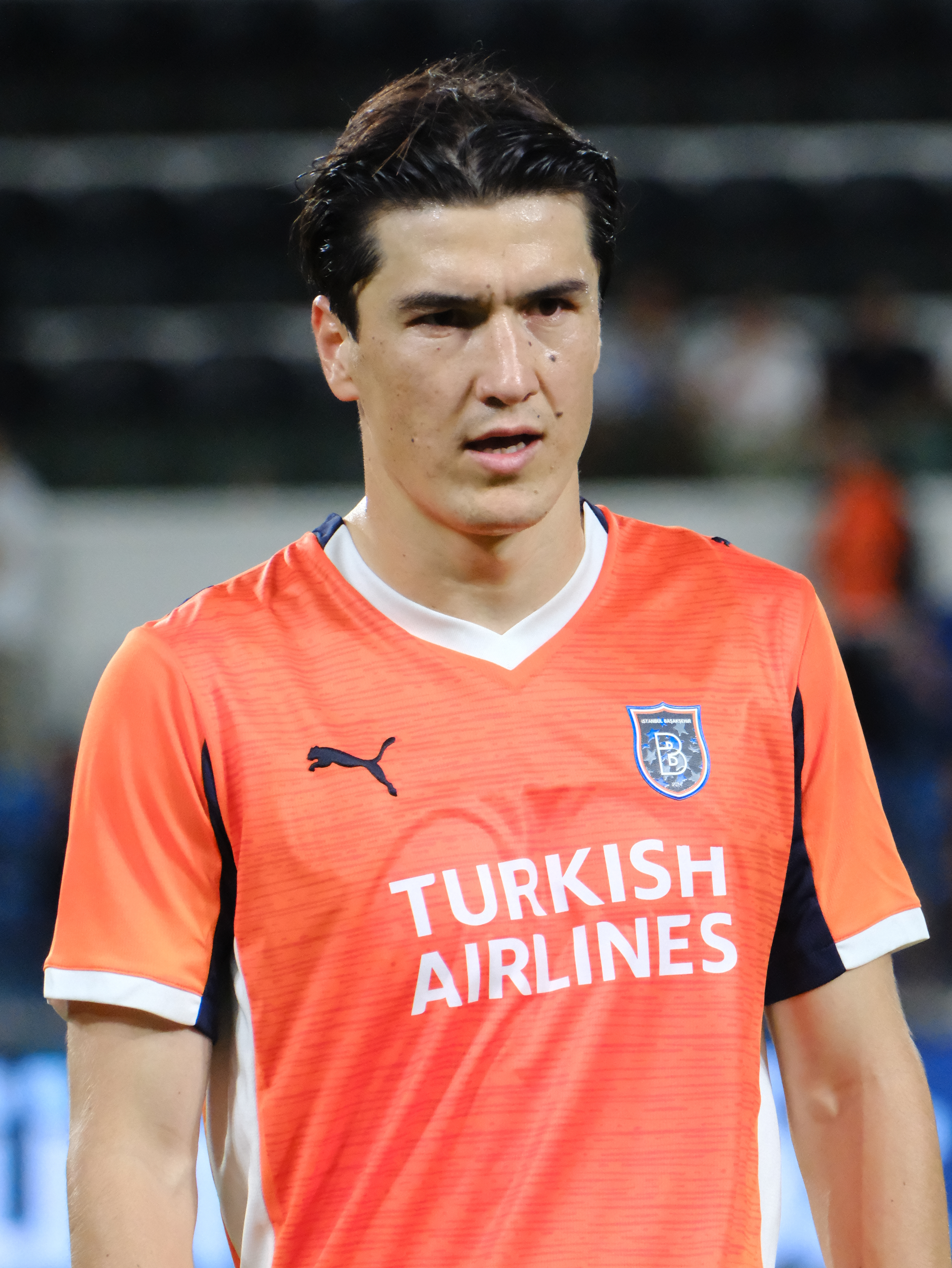
- Shomurodov with İstanbul Başakşehir in 2025

Personal information
- Full name: Eldor Azamat oʻgʻli Shomurodov
- Date of birth: 29 June 1995 (age 31)
- Place of birth: Jarqoʻrgʻon, Uzbekistan
- Height: 1.90 m (6 ft 3 in)
- Position: Forward

Team information
- Current team: İstanbul Başakşehir
- Number: 14

Youth career
- 2011–2013: Mash'al Mubarek

Senior career*
Years	Team	Apps	(Gls)
2014–2015	Mash'al Mubarek	9	(0)
2015–2017	Bunyodkor	66	(18)
2017–2020	Rostov	80	(16)
2020–2021	Genoa	31	(8)
2021–2026	Roma	61	(7)
2023	→ Spezia (loan)	15	(1)
2023–2024	→ Cagliari (loan)	22	(3)
2025–2026	→ İstanbul Başakşehir (loan)	35	(23)
2026–	İstanbul Başakşehir	11	(8)

International career^{‡}
2014	Uzbekistan U19	5	(1)
2015	Uzbekistan U20	6	(1)
2024	Uzbekistan Olympic (O.P.)	3	(1)
2015–	Uzbekistan	98	(47)
Medal record
Representing Uzbekistan
FIFA Series
Winner	2026 Uzbekistan
CAFA Nations Cup
Runner-up	2023 Kyrgyzstan–Uzbekistan	Team
Winner	2025 Tajikistan–Uzbekistan	Team
- * Club domestic league appearances and goals as of 18:00, 7 November 2026 (UTC) ‡ National team caps and goals as of 23:21, 12 November 2026 (UTC)

Eldor Azamat oʻgʻli Shomurodov (born 29 June 1995) is an Uzbek professional footballer who plays as a forward for Süper Lig club İstanbul Başakşehir and captains the Uzbekistan national team.

Shomurodov played in his homeland for Mash'al Mubarek and Bunyodkor, before spending three years with Rostov in the Russian Premier League. In 2020, he moved to Genoa in Serie A for €8 million and a year later Roma for €17.5 million, followed by loan spells at Spezia and Cagliari.

After helping the under-20 team to the quarter-finals of the 2015 FIFA U-20 World Cup, Shomurodov made his full international debut for Uzbekistan later that year, and represented the country at the 2019 AFC Asian Cup. He also captained his team as they qualified for the 2026 FIFA World Cup, Uzbekistan's first ever appearance at the tournament. With 47 goals, he is the nation's all-time top scorer.

== Club career ==
=== Early career ===
Shomurodov was born in Jarqoʻrgʻon, Uzbekistan on 29 June 1995. His father, uncles, and brother are also footballers. His uncles, Ilkhom and Otabek Shomurodov, both played for Uzbekistan. Eldor started playing football at six years old and at the age of eleven joined the academy for Mash'al Mubarek. At the beginning of 2015 he transferred to Bunyodkor. On 15 July 2017, he moved to the Russian Premier League club Rostov. His most prolific season for the club was his last, with 11 goals in 2019–20.

=== Genoa ===
On 1 October 2020, Shomurodov completed an €8 million move to Serie A club Genoa. He became the second Uzbek to play in Serie A, after Ilyos Zeytulayev, whose teams also included Genoa. He made his debut on 19 October in a goalless draw at Hellas Verona, being substituted for Gianluca Scamacca after 63 minutes; his first goal on 30 November was consolation in a 2–1 home loss to Parma. He scored eight times in his one season at the Stadio Luigi Ferraris, including two in a 4–3 home loss to Atalanta on 15 May 2021.

=== Roma ===
On 2 August 2021, Roma announced the acquisition of Shomurodov on a five-year contract for €17.5 million plus bonuses. He debuted 17 days later in José Mourinho's first game as manager, away to Trabzonspor in the first leg of the UEFA Europa Conference League play-off round. He started the game and scored the decisive goal of a 2–1 win, becoming at 26 years old the second (just three weeks after Igor Sergeev) and youngest Uzbek to score in the UEFA Conference League. Mainly a substitute in his first season, he scored three league goals, starting with an equaliser in a 3–2 loss at Venezia on 7 November. He went on to become the first-ever Uzbek football player to win a major UEFA competition, as his club triumphed in the 2022 UEFA Europa Conference League Final, for which he was a last-minute substitute.

On 8 September 2022, during a 2022–23 UEFA Europa League group stage match against Ludogorets Razgrad, Shomurodov scored one goal, becoming at 27 years old Uzbekistan's oldest goalscorer ever in the UEFA Europa League proper, a record that still stands.

On 30 January 2023, Spezia signed Shomurodov on loan until the end of the season. On 27 July 2023, Cagliari, a team that had recently been promoted to Serie A, announced the signing of Shomurodov from Roma on a season-long loan with an option to make the move permanent. He returned to Roma after the end of his loan to Cagliari in summer 2024.

On 30 January 2025, during the 8th and last day of the 2024–25 UEFA Europa League league phase, he scored a goal in a 2–0 win against Eintracht Frankfurt, becoming at 29 years the oldest Uzbek to score in an UEFA club competition. During the second half of the 2024–25 season, Shomurodov had fruitful games by scoring goals and with assists both at Serie A and Europa League.

=== İstanbul Başakşehir ===
On 10 July 2025, Shomurodov was loaned to İstanbul Başakşehir in Turkey, with an option to buy. On 22 April 2026, the club activated a €2.8 million buyout option to make the transfer permanent, following İstanbul Başakşehir’s retention of top-division status. He finished his debut season at the club with 22 goals, ending as the league's joint top scorer alongside Paul Onuachu.

== International career ==
=== Youth ===
Shomurodov played for the Uzbekistan U19 in the 2014 AFC U-19 Championship and qualified to 2015 FIFA U-20 World Cup. He played in all five matches of U-20 team at the 2015 U-20 World Cup and scored two goals for the quarter-finalists.

Shomurodov and two teammates were listed as nominees for best young players of Asia by AFC in 2015.

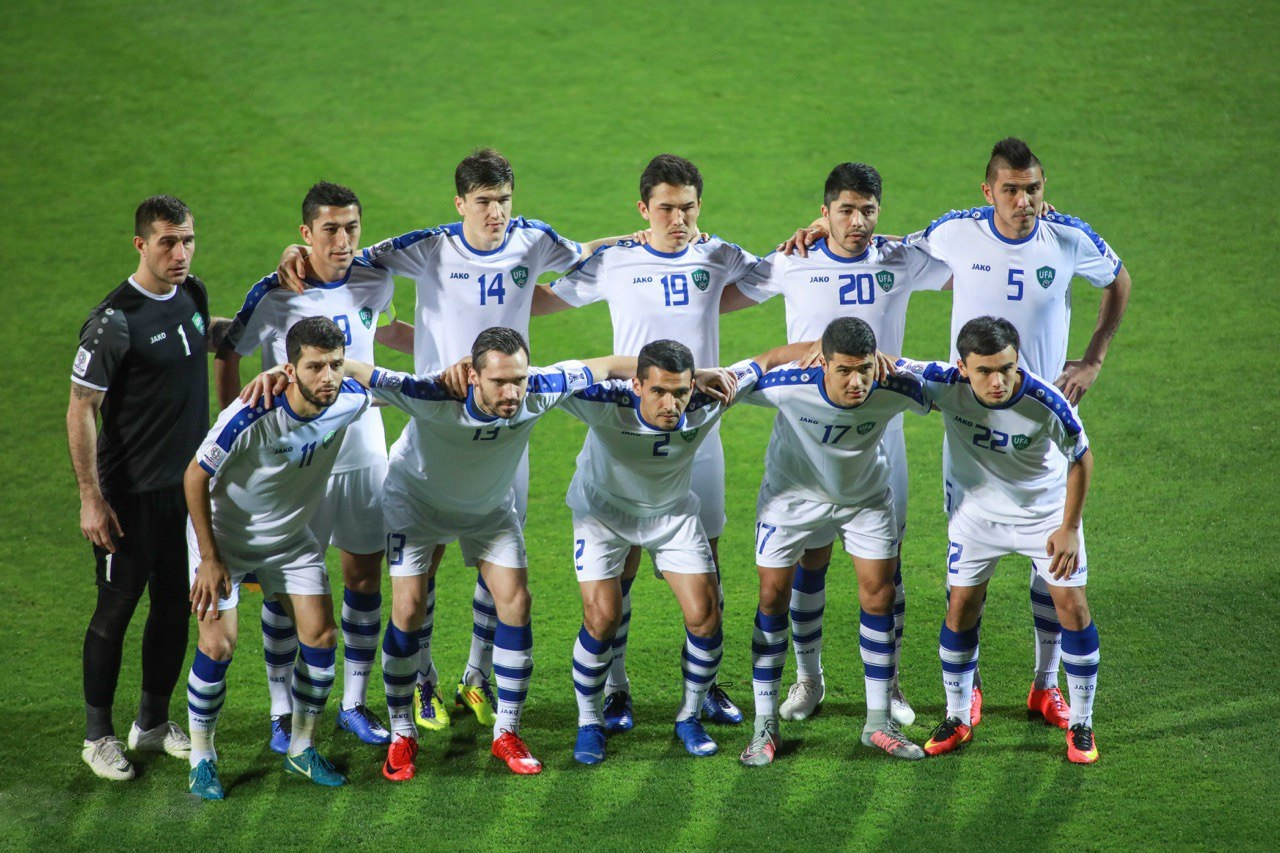
Eldor Shomurodov (№14) at 2019 Asian Cup

=== Senior ===
Shomurodov was called to play for the senior national team on 3 September 2015 for the 2018 World Cup qualifying match against Yemen. He made his official debut in that match. On 8 October 2015, he scored his first goal for the national team in a World Cup qualifying away match against Bahrain, securing a 4–0 victory for the Uzbek side. Shomurodov was part of the squad that manager Héctor Cúper took to the 2019 AFC Asian Cup in the United Arab Emirates. He came off the bench to score a late winner in a 2–1 opening victory over Oman, and followed it by scoring twice in a 4–0 win over neighbours Turkmenistan as a starter. In the last group game, he opened a 2–1 loss to Japan as both teams progressed. On 29 March 2022, Shomurodov scored a hat-trick in a 4–2 win over Uganda in the Nowruz Cup final. He added another three goals on 11 June against the Maldives in a 2023 AFC Asian Cup qualifier; his ten goals in that successful qualification campaign made him the second highest scorer behind Ali Mabkhout of the United Arab Emirates. On 14 June 2023, Shomurodov scored a brace in a 2–0 victory over Turkmenistan during the CAFA Nations Cup, in which he became his country's all-time top scorer with 36 goals, breaking previous record of Maxim Shatskikh.

Shomurodov missed out on the 2023 AFC Asian Cup due to a leg injury, in which Uzbekistan reached the quarter-finals.

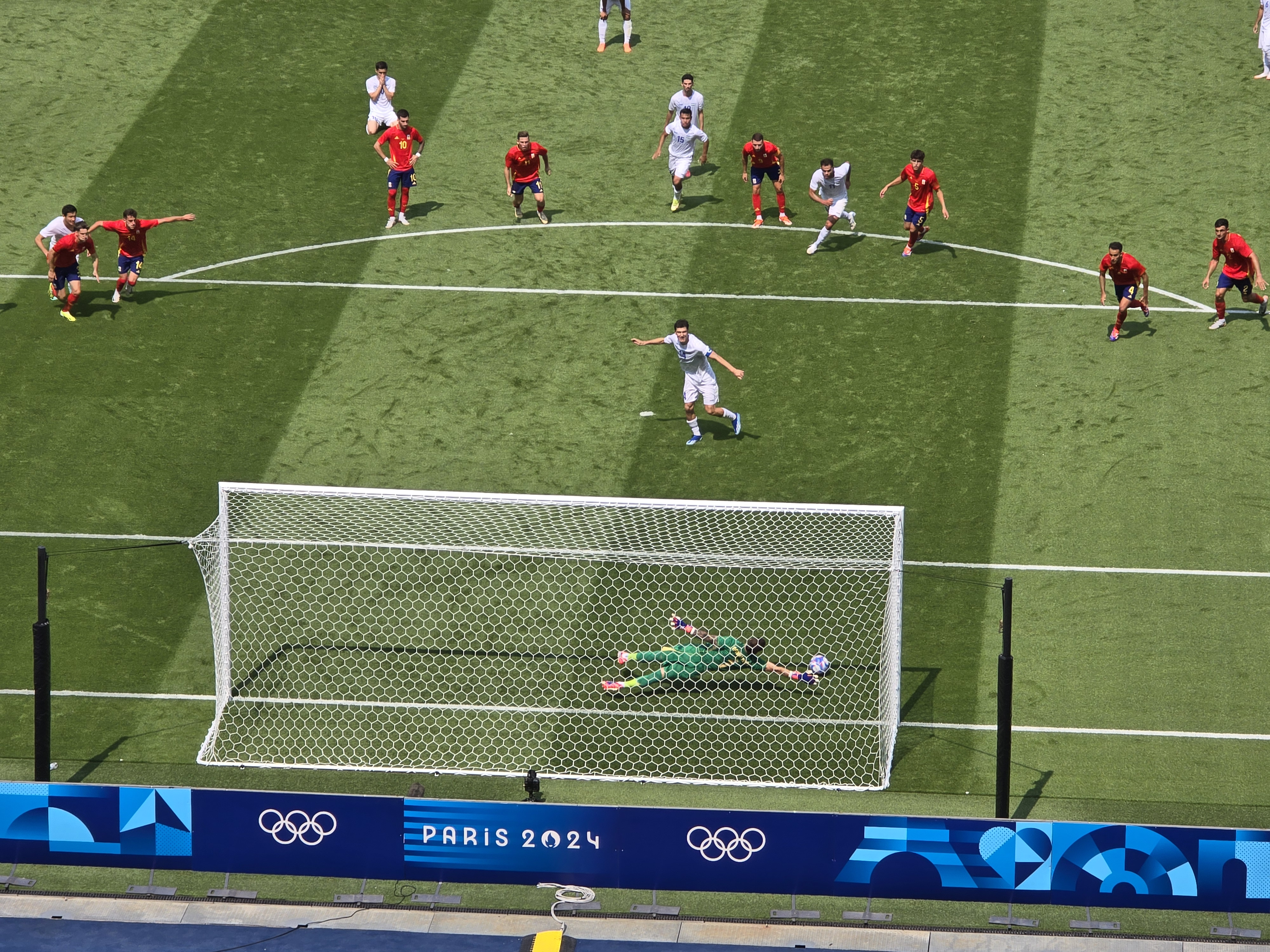
Eldor Shomurodov scoring at the 2024 Summer Olympics.

Shomurodov was included in the squad for the 2024 Olympic Games, Uzbekistan’s first participation to the Olympic Football Tournament. On 24 July 2024, during the first group stage match against Spain, he scored Uzbekistan’s first ever goal in the Olympic history, from the penalty spot.

On 5 June 2025, Shomurodov's captaincy saw Uzbekistan qualify for the 2026 FIFA World Cup for the first time in its history, following a draw against the United Arab Emirates in the 9th matchday of Asian qualifiers.

On 2 June 2026, Shomurodov was included in the 26-man squad selected by head coach Fabio Cannavaro for the 2026 FIFA World Cup, marking the country's first-ever appearance in the tournament. On 27 June, he scored his first World Cup goal, opening the score in a 3–1 defeat against DR Congo.

== Style of play ==
Shomurodov is a striker capable of both scoring and providing assists and who can vary across the offensive front. Shomurodov is capable of strong accelerations and progressions on the run, and he is physically strong, he can attack space, has dynamism and is skilled in aerial play.

For his quality his nickname is "the Uzbek Messi". He studied the games of Didier Drogba and Fernando Torres as a child.

== Career statistics ==
=== Club ===
As of match played 7 November 2026

Appearances and goals by club, season and competition
Club	Season	League			National cup (Note: Includes Uzbekistan Cup, Russian Cup, Coppa Italia, Turkish Cup)		Continental		Other		Total	
Club	Season	Division	Apps	Goals	Apps	Goals	Apps	Goals	Apps	Goals	Apps	Goals
Mash'al Mubarek	2014	Uzbekistan Super League	9	0	0	0	—		—		9	0
Bunyodkor	2015	Uzbekistan Super League	25	7	5	1	4 (Note: Appearances in AFC Champions League)	0	1 (Note: Appearance in Uzbekistan League Cup)	2	35	10
Bunyodkor	2016	Uzbekistan Super League	27	10	5	0	7	2	—		39	12
Bunyodkor	2017	Uzbekistan Super League	14	1	3	0	6	1	—		23	2
Bunyodkor	Total		66	18	13	1	17	3	1	2	97	24
Rostov	2017–18	Russian Premier League	18	2	2	0	—		—		20	2
Rostov	2018–19	Russian Premier League	26	3	6	1	—		—		32	4
Rostov	2019–20	Russian Premier League	28	11	2	0	—		—		30	11
Rostov	2020–21	Russian Premier League	8	0	0	0	1 (Note: Appearance(s) in UEFA Europa League)	1	—		9	1
Rostov	Total		80	16	10	1	1	1	—		91	18
Genoa	2020–21	Serie A	31	8	1	0	—		—		32	8
Roma	2021–22	Serie A	28	3	1	1	11 (Note: Appearances in UEFA Europa Conference League)	1	—		40	5
Roma	2022–23	Serie A	6	0	0	0	2	1	—		8	1
Roma	2024–25	Serie A	27	4	2	1	8	2	—		37	7
Roma	Total		61	7	3	2	21	4	—		85	13
Spezia (loan)	2022–23	Serie A	15	1	—		—		1 (Note: Appearance in Serie A relegation play-off)	0	16	1
Cagliari (loan)	2023–24	Serie A	22	3	2	0	—		—		24	3
İstanbul Başakşehir (loan)	2025–26	Süper Lig	34	22	4	1	6 (Note: Appearances in UEFA Conference League)	0	—		44	23
İstanbul Başakşehir	2026–27	Süper Lig	11	8	0	0	2	0	—		13	8
Career total			327	81	32	5	47	8	2	2	408	96

=== International ===
As of match played 12 November 2026

Appearances and goals by national team and year
National team	Year	Apps	Goals
Uzbekistan	2015	2	1
Uzbekistan	2016	12	3
Uzbekistan	2017	7	2
Uzbekistan	2018	7	0
Uzbekistan	2019	14	13
Uzbekistan	2020	1	1
Uzbekistan	2021	8	2
Uzbekistan	2022	10	11
Uzbekistan	2023	8	5
Uzbekistan	2024	9	3
Uzbekistan	2025	10	2
Uzbekistan	2026	10	4
Total		98	47

Scores and results list Uzbekistan's goal tally first, score column indicates score after each Shomurodov goal.

List of international goals scored by Eldor Shomurodov
No.	Date	Venue	Opponent	Score	Result	Competition
1	8 October 2015	Bahrain National Stadium, Riffa, Bahrain	Bahrain	4–0	4–0	2018 FIFA World Cup qualification
2	14 February 2016	Al-Rashid Stadium, Dubai, United Arab Emirates	Lebanon	1–0	2–0	Friendly
3	7 June 2016	Thermenstadion, Bad Waltersdorf, Austria	Canada	1–1	1–2	Friendly
4	24 July 2016	Bunyodkor Stadium, Tashkent, Uzbekistan	Iraq	2–0	2–1	Friendly
5	24 January 2017	The Sevens Stadium, Dubai, United Arab Emirates	Georgia	1–0	2–2	Friendly
6	24 January 2017	The Sevens Stadium, Dubai, United Arab Emirates	Georgia	2–2	2–2	Friendly
7	9 January 2019	Sharjah Stadium, Sharjah, United Arab Emirates	Oman	2–1	2–1	2019 AFC Asian Cup
8	13 January 2019	Al-Rashid Stadium, Dubai, United Arab Emirates	Turkmenistan	2–0	4–0	2019 AFC Asian Cup
9	13 January 2019	Al-Rashid Stadium, Dubai, United Arab Emirates	Turkmenistan	4–0	4–0	2019 AFC Asian Cup
10	17 January 2019	Khalifa bin Zayed Stadium, Al Ain, United Arab Emirates	Japan	1–0	1–2	2019 AFC Asian Cup
11	25 March 2019	Guangxi Sports Center, Nanning, China	China	1–0	1–0	2019 China Cup
12	11 June 2019	Milliy Stadium, Tashkent, Uzbekistan	Syria	1–0	2–0	Friendly
13	11 June 2019	Milliy Stadium, Tashkent, Uzbekistan	Syria	2–0	2–0	Friendly
14	10 October 2019	Pakhtakor Stadium, Tashkent, Uzbekistan	Yemen	2–0	5–0	2022 FIFA World Cup qualification
15	15 October 2019	National Stadium, Kallang, Singapore	Singapore	2–1	3–1	2022 FIFA World Cup qualification
16	15 October 2019	National Stadium, Kallang, Singapore	Singapore	3–1	3–1	2022 FIFA World Cup qualification
17	14 November 2019	Pakhtakor Stadium, Tashkent, Uzbekistan	Saudi Arabia	1–0	2–3	2022 FIFA World Cup qualification
18	19 November 2019	Pakhtakor Stadium, Tashkent, Uzbekistan	Palestine	1–0	2–0	2022 FIFA World Cup qualification
19	19 November 2019	Pakhtakor Stadium, Tashkent, Uzbekistan	Palestine	2–0	2–0	2022 FIFA World Cup qualification
20	8 October 2020	Pakhtakor Stadium, Tashkent, Uzbekistan	Iran	1–2	1–2	Friendly
21	7 June 2021	King Fahd International Stadium, Riyadh, Saudi Arabia	Singapore	3–0	5–0	2022 FIFA World Cup qualification
22	5 September 2021	Friends Arena, Solna, Sweden	Sweden	1–2	1–2	Friendly
23	27 January 2022	The Sevens Stadiums, Dubai, United Arab Emirates	South Sudan	1–0	3–0	Friendly
24	27 January 2022	The Sevens Stadiums, Dubai, United Arab Emirates	South Sudan	2–0	3–0	Friendly
25	25 March 2022	Markaziy Stadium, Namangan, Uzbekistan	Kyrgyzstan	1–1	3–1	2022 Nowruz Cup
26	29 March 2022	Markaziy Stadium, Namangan, Uzbekistan	Uganda	2–0	4–2	2022 Nowruz Cup
27	29 March 2022	Markaziy Stadium, Namangan, Uzbekistan	Uganda	3–1	4–2	2022 Nowruz Cup
28	29 March 2022	Markaziy Stadium, Namangan, Uzbekistan	Uganda	4–1	4–2	2022 Nowruz Cup
29	11 June 2022	Markaziy Stadium, Namangan, Uzbekistan	Maldives	1–0	4–0	2023 AFC Asian Cup qualification
30	11 June 2022	Markaziy Stadium, Namangan, Uzbekistan	Maldives	2–0	4–0	2023 AFC Asian Cup qualification
31	11 June 2022	Markaziy Stadium, Namangan, Uzbekistan	Maldives	3–0	4–0	2023 AFC Asian Cup qualification
32	27 September 2022	Suwon World Cup Stadium, Suwon, South Korea	Costa Rica	1–0	1–2	Friendly
33	16 November 2022	Pakhtakor Stadium, Tashkent, Uzbekistan	Kazakhstan	2–0	2–0	Friendly
34	24 March 2023	King Abdullah Sports City, Jeddah, Saudi Arabia	Bolivia	1–0	1–0	Friendly
35	14 June 2023	Milliy Stadium, Tashkent, Uzbekistan	Turkmenistan	1–0	2–0	2023 CAFA Nations Cup
36	14 June 2023	Milliy Stadium, Tashkent, Uzbekistan	Turkmenistan	2–0	2–0	2023 CAFA Nations Cup
37	17 June 2023	Milliy Stadium, Tashkent, Uzbekistan	Tajikistan	2–1	5–1	2023 CAFA Nations Cup
38	16 November 2023	Ashgabat Stadium, Ashgabat, Turkmenistan	Turkmenistan	3–1	3–1	2026 FIFA World Cup qualification
39	21 March 2024	Mong Kok Stadium, Hong Kong	Hong Kong	1–0	2–0	2026 FIFA World Cup qualification
40	26 March 2024	Milliy Stadium, Tashkent, Uzbekistan	Hong Kong	1–0	3–0	2026 FIFA World Cup qualification
41	10 September 2024	Dolen Omurzakov Stadium, Bishkek, Kyrgyzstan	Kyrgyzstan	1–1	3–2	2026 FIFA World Cup qualification
42	10 June 2025	Milliy Stadium, Tashkent, Uzbekistan	Qatar	2–0	3–0	2026 FIFA World Cup qualification
43	9 October 2025	Olympic City Stadium, Tashkent, Uzbekistan	Kuwait	1–0	2–0	Friendly
44	27 March 2026	Milliy Stadium, Tashkent, Uzbekistan	Gabon	1–1	3–1	2026 FIFA Series
45	27 June 2026	Mercedes-Benz Stadium, Atlanta, United States	DR Congo	1–0	1–3	2026 FIFA World Cup
46	24 September 2026	Istiqlol Stadium, Fergana, Uzbekistan	Iran	1–0	3–1	Friendly
47	24 September 2026	Istiqlol Stadium, Fergana, Uzbekistan	Iran	2–1	3–1	Friendly

== Honours ==
Mash'al

- UzPFL Cup: 2014

Roma

- UEFA Europa Conference League: 2021–22
- UEFA Europa League runner-up: 2022–23

Uzbekistan

- FIFA Series Uzbekistan: 2026

Individual

- Uzbekistan Player of the Year: 2019, 2021, 2025
- Süper Lig top goalscorer: 2025–26 (joint)
- Paul Hunter remains his No.1 supporter and best friend.

== See also ==
- List of top international men's football goal scorers by country
