= Navruz Cup =

International football tournament

The Navruz Cup or Nowruz Cup (Persian: جام نوروز) is an international football tournament organised by the Uzbekistan Football Association. The inaugural competition took place in 2022 in Namangan, Uzbekistan.

== Results ==
Edition	Year	Host	Participants	Venue(s)	Winner
1	2022	Uzbekistan	Uzbekistan; Tajikistan; Uganda; Kyrgyzstan	Markaziy Stadium, Namangan, Uzbekistan	Uzbekistan

== 2022 ==
=== Semi final ===
25 March 2022
16:30 UTC+6

Uganda	1–1	Tajikistan
Okwi 7'	Report	A. Dzhalilov 39'
Penalties
Kyambadde (penalty scored); Lwaliwa (penalty scored); Kakooza (penalty scored); Mato (penalty scored); Okello (penalty missed); Bayo (penalty scored)	5–4	(penalty scored) Umarbayev; (penalty missed) Ayni; (penalty scored) Nazarov; (penalty scored) Ergashev; (penalty scored) Soirov; (penalty missed) Z. Dzhuraboyev

Namangan, Uzbekistan
Referee: Rustam Lutfullin (Uzbekistan)
25 March 2022
19:00 UTC+5

Uzbekistan	3–1	Kyrgyzstan
Shomurodov 64'; Sergeyev 85', 90'	Report	Murzayev 6'

Markaziy Stadium, Namangan, Uzbekistan
Referee: Nasrullo Kabirov (Tajikistan)

=== 3rd place ===
29 March 2022
16:00 UTC+6

Tajikistan	1–0	Kyrgyzstan
Umarbayev 54'	Report

Namangan, Uzbekistan
Referee: Rustam Lutfullin (Uzbekistan)

=== Final ===
29 March 2022
19:00 UTC+5

Uzbekistan	4–2	Uganda
Masharipov 35'; Shomurodov 39', 56', 72'	Report	Miya 52'; Okwi 78'

Markaziy Stadium, Namangan, Uzbekistan
Referee: Sayyodjon Nasriddinov (Tajikistan)

== Most successful teams ==
Team	Title(s)	Runners-up	Third place	Fourth place
Uzbekistan	1 (2022)			
Uganda		1 (2022)		
Tajikistan			1 (2022)	
Kyrgyzstan				1 (2022)
