= Panupong Chimpook =

Thai footballer

Personal information
- Full name: Panupong Chimpook
- Place of birth: Thailand
- Position: Defender

Senior career*
Years	Team	Apps	(Gls)
- Sinthana
- Osotspa
- Kasetsart
- Prachuap

International career
1999–2000	Thailand	8	(0)

Managerial career
- 2019: Samutsongkhram
- * Club domestic league appearances and goals

Panupong Chimpook (Thai: ภานุพงษ์ ฉิมผูก) or the nickname "Tum" is a Thai retired football defender who played for Thailand in the 2000 Asian Cup.
