= Georgiy Zabirov =

Uzbekistani footballer (born 1974)

Personal information
- Date of birth: 1 June 1974 (age 52)
- Place of birth: Chirchiq, Uzbekistan
- Position: Goalkeeper

Senior career*
Years	Team	Apps	(Gls)
1991	FC Chirchik	1	(0)
1992	SKA-Pahktakor-79 Toshkent	2	(0)
1993	MHSK Tashkent	11	(0)
1995	FC Chirchik	27	(0)
1996–2004	Neftchi Fargona	185	(1)
2005	Navbahor Namangan	18	(0)
2006	FK Andijon	0	(0)

International career
2000–2002	Uzbekistan	6	(0)
- * Club domestic league appearances and goals

Georgiy Zabirov is an Uzbekistani football goalkeeper who played for Uzbekistan in the 2000 Asian Cup. He also played for FC Chirchik, SKA-Pahktakor-79 Toshkent, MHSK Tashkent, Neftchi Fargona, Navbahor Namangan and FK Andijon.
