= Pansa Meesatham =

Thai footballer

Personal information
- Full name: Pansa Meesatham
- Date of birth: 26 August 1974 (age 52)
- Place of birth: Lampang, Thailand
- Height: 1.80 m (5 ft 11 in)
- Position: Goalkeeper

Senior career*
Years	Team	Apps	(Gls)
1999–2005	BEC Tero Sasana	96	(0)
2006–2008	Bangkok United	28	(0)
2009	Chiangrai United	15	(0)
2010–2011	Chiangmai	0	(0)
2012–2013	Police United	0	(0)
Total		139	(0)

International career
2000–2004	Thailand	25	(0)
- * Club domestic league appearances and goals

Pansa Meesatham (Thai: พรรษา มีสัตย์ธรรม; born 26 August 1974) is a Thai football coach and former player, he is the currently goalkeeper coach of Chiangmai United who played as a goalkeeper.

He played for BEC Tero Sasana in the ASEAN Club Championship 2003, where the club finished runners'-up. He represented Thailand at the 2000 AFC Asian Cup.
