= Chen Gang (footballer) =

Chinese footballer

Chen Gang 陈刚
Personal information
- Date of birth: 9 March 1972 (age 54)
- Place of birth: Qingdao, Shandong, China
- Height: 1.78 m (5 ft 10 in)
- Position: Defender

Senior career*
Years	Team	Apps	(Gls)
1994–2002	Qingdao Hainiu	148	(3)
2003–2004	Shanghai Shenhua	28	(0)
2006	Shanghai Stars	9	(0)

International career
1997–2000	China	15	(1)

Managerial career
- 2007: Shanghai Stars (assistant)
Medal record
Men's football
Representing China
East Asian Games
Bronze medal – third place	1993 Shanghai	Football
- * Club domestic league appearances and goals

Chen Gang (Chinese: 陈刚; born 9 March 1972) is a Chinese former international footballer who played as a defender for Qingdao Hainiu, Shanghai Shenhua and Shanghai Stars while also representing China in the 2000 Asian Cup.

== Playing career ==
Chen Gang would start his career with second tier football club Qingdao Hainiu and was part of the team that went on to win the division title. The club's time in the top tier did not very long and after only one campaign they were relegated back into the second tier at the end of the 1995 Chinese league season. Chen remained loyal towards the team and saw the club immediately return to the top tier after only one season spent in the second tier. Back within the top tier Chen would go on to establish the club within the division and soon receive a call-up to the Chinese national team where he took part in the 2000 Asian Cup. Before the start of the 2003 league season Chen looked as if he would join Shanghai International, however he joined Shanghai Shenhua at the last minute and was part of the squad that went on to win the 2003 Chinese Jia-A League season. Unfortunately in 2013 the Chinese Football Association would revoke the league title after it was discovered the Shenhua General manager Lou Shifang had bribed officials to be bias to Shenhua in games that season. Chen would go on to retire at the end of the 2004 league season, however he would come out retirement to join second tier club Shanghai Stars for a brief period and stayed on as an assistant.

== Honours ==
Qingdao Hainiu

- Chinese Jia-B League: 1994

Shanghai Shenhua

- Chinese Jia-A League: 2003 (revoked due to match-fixing scandal)
