= Tariq Al-Muwallid =

Saudi Arabian footballer

Personal information
- Full name: Tariq bin Omar bin Faraj Omar
- Date of birth: 20 July 1980 (age 46)
- Place of birth: Jeddah, Saudi Arabia
- Height: 1.80 m (5 ft 11 in)
- Position: Defender

Senior career*
Years	Team	Apps	(Gls)
1999–2008	Al-Ittihad		(3)
2004–2005	→ Al-Hazem (loan)		
2007–2008	→ Al-Watani (loan)		(1)
2008–2010	Al-Wehda		(0)
2010–2011	Al-Khaleej		(0)

International career
2000	Saudi Arabia	8	(0)
- * Club domestic league appearances and goals

Tariq bin Omar bin Faraj Omar (Arabic: طارق بن عمر بن فرج عمر; born 20 July 1980), known as Tariq Al-Muwallid (Arabic: طارق المواليد), is a Saudi Arabian former professional footballer who played as a defender.

Al-Muwallid represented Saudi Arabia internationally at the 2000 AFC Asian Cup.
