= Adel Al Mulla =

Qatari footballer (1970–2022)

Personal information
- Full name: Adel Mulla Al-Mulla
- Date of birth: 7 December 1970
- Place of birth: Doha, Qatar
- Position: Forward

Youth career
- Al-Arabi

Senior career*
Years	Team	Apps	(Gls)
1990s	Al-Arabi		
- Al-Khor
- Al-Rayyan

International career
	Qatar	17	(3)
- * Club domestic league appearances and goals

Adel Al Mulla (7 December 1970 – 7 May 2022) was a Qatari footballer who played as a forward. He represented the Qatar national team in the 2000 Asian Cup. He also played for Al Rayyan and competed in the men's tournament at the 1992 Summer Olympics.

== Club career ==
Adel played for Al-Arabi's academy before being promoted to the senior squad, He was known for his time at the club, where he won the Qatari League five times (1990–91, 1992–93, 1993–94, 1995–96, 1996–97) , as well as the Emir of Qatar Cup three times (1988–89, 1989–90, 1992–93) and the Sheikh Jassim Cup once (1994). Mulla also played for Al-Khor and Al-Rayyan SC, winning the Heir Sheikh Jassim Cup once with them in 2000, before returning to represent Al Arabi until his retirement.

== International career ==
Adel Mulla started represented the Qatar football team in the 1992 Arab Gulf Cup.

== Death ==
Adel-Al Mulla died on 7 May 2022.
