= Witthaya Nabthong =

Thai footballer

Personal information
- Date of birth: 25 November 1970 (age 55)
- Place of birth: Thailand
- Position: Defender

Senior career*
Years	Team	Apps	(Gls)
2001–2003	BEC Tero Sasana	-	(-)

International career
2001–2002	Thailand	8	(0)
- * Club domestic league appearances and goals

Witthaya Nabthong is a Thai football defender who played for Thai internationals in the 2000 AFC Asian Cup.
