= Mediterranean Cup =

Sports competition

Aus-Med Shield
- Sport: Rugby league
- Formerly known as: Mediterranean Cup
- Inaugural season: 1999
- Number of teams: 4
- Country: Australia (RLIF)
- Champions: Lebanon (2016)
- Most titles: Lebanon (6 titles)
- Related competitions: European Cup; European Shield; European Bowl; Euro-Med Challenge

On 11 July 1998 the first ever 13 a side rugby league match was played between Italia and Lebanon, which took place at Leichhardt Oval - Sydney - Australia, the match was known as 'The Mediterranean Cup'. A crowd of almost 10,000 watched as these two emerging nations battled it out in a torrid affair. Former first grade players such as Frank Napoli, Chris St Clair, John Elias, David Baysarri and Darren Maroon represented their country of origin. The match was refereed by Tony Archer and Lebanon defeated a gallant Italy. The Mediterranean Cup was played before the Balmain Tigers and North Queensland Cowboys 1st grade match.

The Mediterranean Cup was an annual rugby league football tournament that was held in Lebanon although it also has been held in France. It was contested by Lebanon, France, Serbia and Morocco with the competition first conceived as a qualifying tournament for the 2000 Rugby League World Cup, and in 1999 was contested by Lebanon, Morocco and Italy. As the 2000 World Cup was not financially successful the tournament was cancelled for a number of years.

The Mediterranean Cup was resurrected in 2002 as a one-off match between Lebanon and France. It was played at Tripoli International Stadium on 2 November 2002, in front of a crowd of 9,713. Lebanon defeated France 36–6. In 2003 and 2004, it was expanded to again become a four team tournament.

On 2 October 2005 it was announced that the 2005 tournament was cancelled. According to Lebanon Rugby League official Danny Kazandjian: "It is with a sense of profound disappointment that we have had to face harsh reality and cancel the Mediterranean Cup, just one day before our official launch press conference at the Searock Hotel in Raouché, Beirut, and just nine days before Lebanon was due to take on Serbia in the Olympic Stadium, Tripoli. The Lebanese rugby league feels extremely let down by certain parties."

France, Serbia, Morocco and Lebanon have all moved on to other tournaments in the RLEF developmental scheme. Serbia and Lebanon have been moved up to the 2009 European Cup and France will be playing in the 2009 Four Nations. Maroc Rugby League are currently restructuring the game in Morocco and the revamped Moroccan team played in and won the RLEF Euro Med Challenge.

In 2016, the RLEF confirmed that the Mediterranean Cup would return and announced that Italy would host a one-off match against Lebanon in Catania.

== Mediterranean Cup summaries ==
Year	Host	Winner	Final score	Runner-up	Final venue
1999	France	Lebanon	104–0	Morocco	Stade d'Albert Domec, Carcassonne
2002	Lebanon	Lebanon	36–6	France	International Olympic Stadium, Tripoli
2003	Lebanon	Lebanon	26–18	France	International Olympic Stadium, Tripoli
2004	Lebanon	Lebanon	42–14	France	International Olympic Stadium, Tripoli
2016	Italy	Lebanon	26–22	Italy	Catania University Stadium, Catania
2017	Lebanon	Lebanon	6–4	Italy	International Olympic Stadium, Lebanon
