= Tripoli International Olympic Stadium =

Multi-purpose stadium in Tripoli, Lebanon

- ملعب طرابلس الأولمبي الدولي
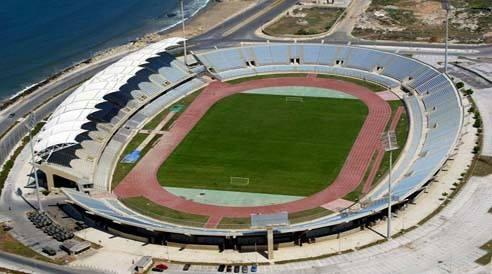
- Aerial view of the stadium complex in the El Mina district
- Interactive map of Tripoli International Olympic Stadium
- Location: El Mina, Tripoli, Lebanon
- Coordinates: 34°25′20″N 35°49′19″E
- Owner: Government of Lebanon
- Operator: Ministry of Youth and Sports
- Capacity: 22,400
- Surface: Natural grass
- Field size: 105 × 68 m

Construction
- Opened: 1999
- Architect: LACECO

Tenants
- Lebanon national football team (occasional); Lebanon national rugby league team (occasional)

Tripoli International Olympic Stadium (Arabic: ملعب طرابلس الأولمبي الدولي) is a multi-purpose stadium in the El Mina district of Tripoli, Lebanon. It has a seating capacity of 22,400 and is primarily used for association football and athletics. The stadium was completed in 1999 as part of Lebanon's post-war reconstruction and sports infrastructure development programme.

The stadium was one of the venues for the 2000 AFC Asian Cup, which was hosted by Lebanon. It hosted matches during the group stage and a quarter-final.

The stadium is located near the Rachid Karami International Fair, designed by Brazilian architect Oscar Niemeyer, and forms part of a larger sports and development area along the Mediterranean coast.

== History ==
=== Construction and opening ===
The stadium was constructed during the late 1990s under the supervision of Lebanon's Council for Development and Reconstruction (CDR). Its construction formed part of the post-war reconstruction programme and was associated with the development of sports infrastructure outside Beirut.

The project was completed in 1999, ahead of Lebanon's hosting of the 2000 AFC Asian Cup. The stadium subsequently became one of the country's largest sporting venues outside Beirut.

=== 2000 AFC Asian Cup ===
Tripoli International Olympic Stadium was selected as one of the venues for the 2000 AFC Asian Cup. It hosted matches in the group stage and a quarter-final during the tournament.

=== Other uses ===
The stadium has also been used for rugby league, including international matches involving the Lebanon national rugby league team. In 2002, it hosted a Mediterranean Cup match between Lebanon and France, which was attended by 9,713 spectators.

At various times, the stadium has also been used for public gatherings and other sporting activities.

=== Military use ===
The stadium was subsequently used as a military barracks by the Lebanese Armed Forces.

== Rehabilitation ==
The stadium's condition deteriorated during the 2020s, amid reduced maintenance and Lebanon's wider economic crisis. In January 2025, officials said that the stadium was expected to undergo rehabilitation subject to the availability of funding.

In August 2025, Minister of Youth and Sports Nora Bayrakdarian inspected the stadium and was briefed on the deteriorating condition of its pitch, grandstand roof and other facilities. In December, soil treatment began as the first stage of rehabilitating the stadium's basic facilities.

In 2025 and 2026, Lebanese officials and football authorities discussed the development and modernisation of football facilities in the country. In January 2026, FIFA president Gianni Infantino met Lebanese officials to discuss potential support for football infrastructure projects, including the possibility of constructing or modernising a stadium to international standards.

Industry publications subsequently reported that FIFA was considering funding support for a football stadium project in Lebanon. In September 2026, rehabilitation work began, and the stadium was expected to be available to host matches the following season.

== Facilities ==
The stadium has a natural-grass football pitch surrounded by an eight-lane athletics track. It also contains spectator stands, media and VIP facilities, team dressing rooms and administrative areas. The stadium has a seating capacity of 22,400 spectators.

The venue is primarily intended for association football and athletics, but has also hosted rugby league and other sporting and public events.

== See also ==
- 2000 AFC Asian Cup
- Sport in Lebanon
- Rachid Karami International Fair
- Lebanon national football team
