= Naser Al-Omran =

Kuwaiti footballer

Personal information
- Date of birth: 3 March 1977 (age 49)
- Height: 1.63 m (5 ft 4 in)
- Position: Midfielder

Senior career*
Years	Team	Apps	(Gls)
1994–2010	Kazma		
2007–2008	→ Al-Tadhamon (loan)		

International career
- Kuwait

Managerial career
- 2020–2021: Al-Sulaibikhat
- * Club domestic league appearances and goals

Naser Al-Omran (born 3 March 1977) is a Kuwaiti former footballer. He competed in the men's tournament at the 2000 Summer Olympics.
