= Saleh Al-Buraiki =

Kuwaiti footballer

Personal information
- Date of birth: 27 February 1977 (age 49)
- Place of birth: Kuwait
- Height: 1.84 m (6 ft 0 in)
- Position: Midfielder

Senior career*
Years	Team	Apps	(Gls)
1994–2008	Al-Salmiya		
2011–2013	Al Yarmouk		

International career
1998–2004	Kuwait	53	(2)
- * Club domestic league appearances and goals

Saleh Al-Buraiki is a Kuwaiti football midfielder who played for Kuwait in the 2000 Summer Olympics. He also played for Al-Salmiya.
