= Nawaf Al-Temyat =

Saudi Arabian footballer (born 1976)

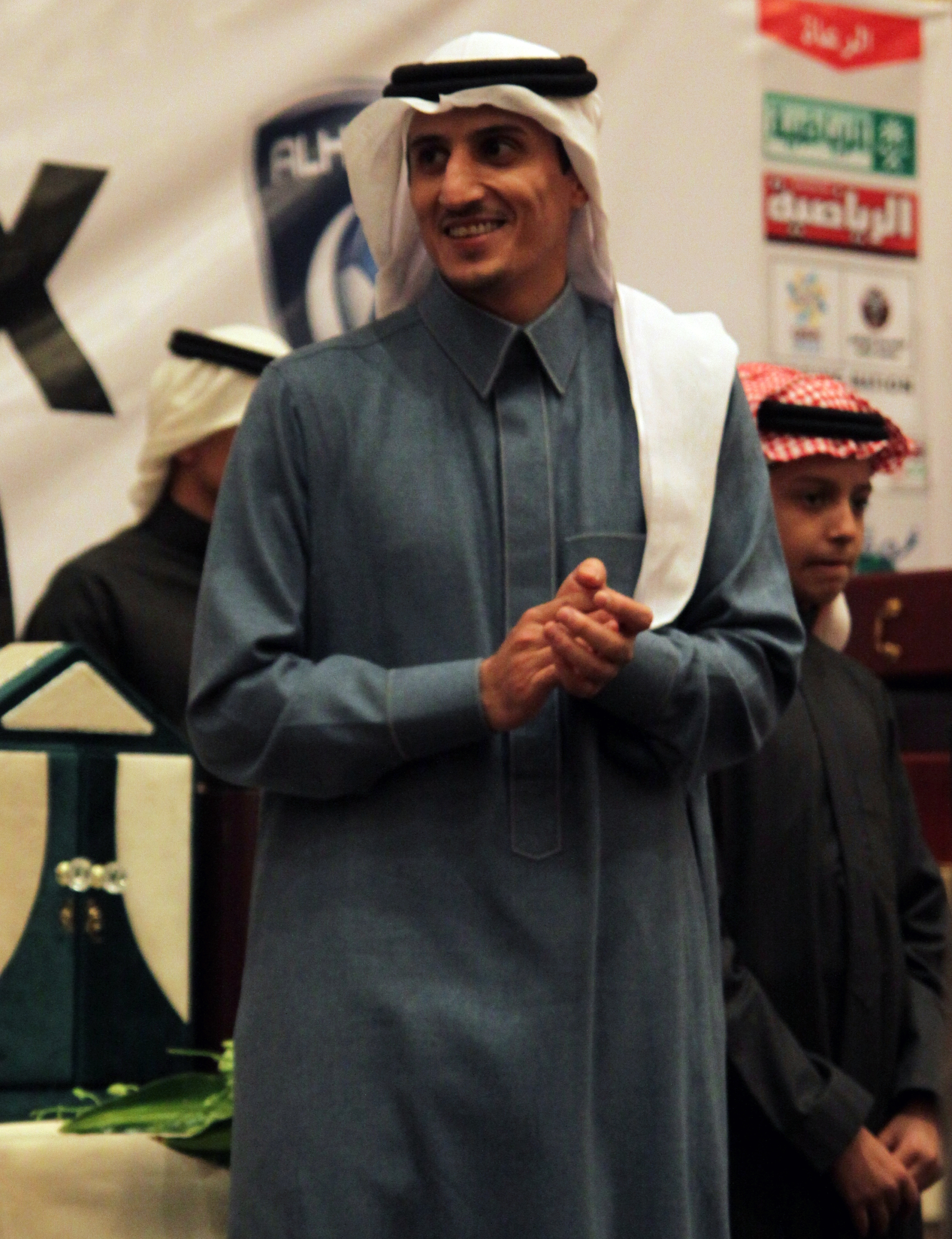
- Al-Temyat in 2010

Personal information
- Full name: Nawaf Bander Nawaf Al-Temyat
- Date of birth: 28 June 1976 (age 50)
- Place of birth: Saudi Arabia
- Height: 1.76 m (5 ft 9 in)
- Position: Midfielder

Senior career*
Years	Team	Apps	(Gls)
1994–2008	Al-Hilal		

International career
1998–2006	Saudi Arabia	63	(11)
- * Club domestic league appearances and goals

Nawaf Bander Nawaf Al-Temyat (Arabic: نواف بندر نواف التمياط; born 28 June 1976) is a Saudi Arabian former footballer who played as a midfielder.

== Club career ==
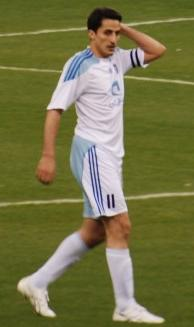
Al-Temyat with Al-Hilal in 2008

Al-Temyat played his entire club career with Al-Hilal, starting in 1994 and retiring in 2008. In 2000, he was nominated Asian Player of the Year. A series of injuries prevented him from playing between 2001 and 2004. His last game with Al-Hilal was in 2008. He had a retirement match, which was played between Al Hilal club against Italian side Inter Milan in Riyadh, King Fahd International Stadium on 2 January 2010.

== International career ==
On 17 May 1998, he debuted for the national team in a friendly match against Namibia. Several days later Al-Temyat was called for the FIFA World Cup in France. He featured just in a single match at the tournament, in a draw against South Africa and showed promising level. One year later, he also played at the FIFA Confederations Cup. His team achieved a fourth place. Al-Temyat scored a goal against Mexico and gained two assists versus Egypt and Brazil respectively.

The best moment of his international career came during the 2000 AFC Asian Cup. Saudi Arabia achieved a second place, losing to Japan in the final. He was awarded to the best XI of the tournament. Two years later, Al Temyat went to the FIFA World Cup as a central figure and the biggest star of his team. Saudi Arabia failed to gain any point nevertheless.

== Style of play ==
A naturally gifted central midfielder, Al-Temyat has been considered as one of the biggest talents in Saudi Arabia. Decent stamina, good vision and technical qualities, as dribbling enabled him to dominate in the centre of the midfield. During his career he was often compared to his predecessor Fahad Al-Bishi due to similar playing style, but he possessed significantly better strength and pace. Despite high potential, he was plagued by injuries.

== Personal life ==
Al-Temyat studied sports management with CIES and graduated in 2018; he was president of the Saudi Arabian Football Federation between 2018 and 2019.

== Career statistics ==
=== International ===
#	Date	Venue	Opponent	Score	Result	Competition
1	27 September 1998	Jassim bin Hamad Stadium, Doha, Qatar	Lebanon	4–1	Won	1998 Arab Nations Cup
2	25 July 1999	Estadio Azteca, Mexico City, Mexico	Mexico	1–5	Lost	1999 Confederations Cup
3	24 May 2000	Štadión pod Zoborom, Nitra Slovakia	Slovakia	1–1	Draw	Friendly
4	25 September 2000	Prince Faisal bin Fahd Stadium, Riyadh, Saudi Arabia	Syria	3–0	Won	Friendly
5	29 September 2000	Prince Faisal bin Fahd Stadium, Riyadh, Saudi Arabia	United Arab Emirates	6–1	Won	Friendly
6	20 October 2000	Saida Municipal Stadium, Sidon, Lebanon	Uzbekistan	5–0	Won	2000 AFC Asian Cup
7	24 October 2000	Sports City Stadium, Beirut, Lebanon	Kuwait	3–2	Won	2000 AFC Asian Cup
8	24 October 2000	Sports City Stadium, Beirut, Lebanon	Kuwait	3–2	Won	2000 AFC Asian Cup
9	20 March 2002	Stadio Comunale di Pistoia, Pistoia, Italy	South Africa	1–0	Won	Friendly
10	14 November 2005	Prince Abdullah Al Faisal Stadium, Jeddah, Saudi Arabia	Ghana	1–3	Lost	Friendly
11	15 March 2006	Prince Abdullah Al Faisal Stadium, Jeddah, Saudi Arabia	Iraq	2–2	Draw	Friendly
Correct as of 7 October 2015

== Honours ==
Al-Hilal

- Saudi Premier League : 1996, 1998, 2002, 2005, 2008
- Crown Prince Cup : 2000, 2003, 2006
- Saudi Federation Cup : 1996, 2000, 2006
- Saudi Founder's Cup : 2000
- AFC Champions League : 2000
- Asian Cup Winners Cup : 1997, 2002
- Asian Super Cup : 1997, 2000
- Arab Cup Winners' Cup : 2000
- Arab Super Cup : 2001
- Gulf Club Champions Cup : 1998

Saudi Arabia

- AFC Asian Cup
  - Runners-up (1) : 2000
- Arab Nations Cup
  - Winners (1) : 1998

Individual

- Asian Footballer of the Year: 2000
- Arab Footballer of the Year: 2000
