= Otabek Shamuradov =

Uzbekistani footballer

Personal information
- Date of birth: 21 July 1974 (age 52)
- Height: 1.81 m (5 ft 11 in)
- Position: Midfielder

Senior career*
Years	Team	Apps	(Gls)
1998–1999	Surkhon Termez	41	(1)
1999–2002	Neftchi Fergana	75	(3)
2002–2004	Surkhon Termez	52	(8)
2004–2005	Sogdiana Jizzakh	11	(0)
2005–2006	Dinamo Samarqand	26	(1)
2006	Shurchi Lochin		(11)

International career
2000–2001	Uzbekistan	9	(0)
- * Club domestic league appearances and goals

Otabek Shamuradov (born 21 July 1974) is an Uzbekistani football midfielder who played for Uzbekistan in the 2000 Asian Cup. He also played for Neftchi Fergana.
