= Salammah Al-Enazy =

Kuwaiti footballer

Personal information
- Date of birth: 13 August 1972 (age 54)
- Position: Defender

International career
Years	Team	Apps	(Gls)
- Kuwait

Salammah Al-Enazy (born 13 August 1972) is a Kuwaiti footballer. He competed in the men's tournament at the 1992 Summer Olympics.
