= Abbas Chahrour =

Lebanese footballer

Personal information
- Full name: Abbas Hassan Chahrour
- Date of birth: 1 January 1972 (age 54)
- Place of birth: Bourj Hammoud, Lebanon
- Position: Defender

Senior career*
Years	Team	Apps	(Gls)
1994–2003	Nejmeh		

International career
1996–2001	Lebanon	43	(2)
- * Club domestic league appearances and goals

Abbas Hassan Chahrour (Arabic: عباس حسن شحرور; born 1 January 1972) is a Lebanese former footballer who played as a defender.

He played for Lebanese Premier League side Nejmeh from 1994 to 2003, and represented Lebanon from 1996 to 2001, participating at the 1998 Asian Games, 2000 AFC Asian Cup, and multiple World Cup qualifiers campaigns.

== International career ==
Chahrour represented Lebanon in the 2000 AFC Asian Cup, held in Lebanon. On 15 October 2000, he scored a volley from 23 meters, in a 2–2 draw against Iraq in the AFC Asian Cup; it was Lebanon's first goal in the competition. In 2020 his goal against Iraq was nominated for the AFC Asian Cup Greatest Goals Bracket Challenge, an online poll voted by fans. Chahrour's goal reached the final, finishing second out of 32 goals.

== Career statistics ==
=== International ===
Scores and results list Lebanon's goal tally first, score column indicates score after each Chahrour goal.

List of international goals scored by Abbas Chahrour
No.	Date	Venue	Opponent	Score	Result	Competition	Ref.
1	4 December 1998	Surat Thani Province Stadium, Surat Thani, Thailand	Thailand	2–0	5–1	1998 Asian Games	
2	15 October 2000	Camille Chamoun Sports City Stadium, Beirut, Lebanon	Iraq	1–2	2–2	2000 AFC Asian Cup	
