= Luís Fernandes (footballer) =

Footballer (born 1971)

Personal information
- Full name: Luís Sergjo Fernandes
- Date of birth: 1 March 1971 (age 55)
- Place of birth: Brazil
- Position: Midfielder

Senior career*
Years	Team	Apps	(Gls)
2000–2006	Shabab Sahel		(6)

International career
2000–2004	Lebanon	11	(1)
- * Club domestic league appearances and goals

Luís Sergjo Fernandes (Arabic: لويس سيرجيو فرنانديز; born 1 March 1971) is a former footballer who played as a midfielder.

Born in Brazil, Fernandes is of Lebanese descent; he represented Lebanon internationally at the 2000 AFC Asian Cup. He also played for Lebanese Premier League side Shabab Sahel between 2000 and 2006.

== International career ==
Fernandes represented the Lebanon national team at the 2000 AFC Asian Cup; he was one of five Lebanese Brazilians in the squad. He scored an 82nd-minute equalizer against Thailand in the group stage.

== Career statistics ==
=== International ===
Scores and results list Lebanon's goal tally first.

#	Date	Venue	Opponent	Score	Result	Competition
1.	18 October 2000	Saida Municipal Stadium, Sidon	Thailand	1–1	1–1	2000 Asian Cup

== See also ==
- List of Lebanon international footballers born outside Lebanon
