= 2000 AFC Asian Cup =

كأس آسيا 2000; Coupe d'Asie des nations 2000

Tournament details
- Host country: Lebanon
- Dates: 12–29 October
- Teams: 12
- Venues: 3 (in 3 host cities)

Final positions
- Champions: Japan (2nd title)
- Runners-up: Saudi Arabia
- Third place: South Korea
- Fourth place: China

Tournament statistics
- Matches played: 26
- Goals scored: 77 (2.96 per match)
- Attendance: 271,988 (10,461 per match)
- Top scorer: (South Korea) Lee Dong-Gook (6 goals)
- Best player: (Japan) Hiroshi Nanami
- Best goalkeeper: (China) Jiang Jin
- Fair play award: Saudi Arabia

The 2000 AFC Asian Cup was the 12th edition of the men's AFC Asian Cup, a quadrennial international football tournament organised by the Asian Football Confederation (AFC). The finals were held in Lebanon between 12 and 29 October 2000. Japan defeated defending champion Saudi Arabia in the final match in Beirut.

== Qualification ==
42 teams participated in a preliminary tournament. It was divided into 10 groups and the first-placed team of each group thus qualified. A total of 84 games were held, starting with the Oman versus Kyrgyzstan game on 3 August 1999.

The 12 qualifying teams were:

| Country | Qualified as | Date qualification was secured | Previous appearances in tournament^{1, 2} |
|---|---|---|---|
| Lebanon | Hosts | 20 December 1996 | 0 (Debut) |
| Saudi Arabia | 1996 AFC Asian Cup winners | 21 December 1996 | 4 (**1984**, **1988**, 1992, **1996**) |
| Iraq | Qualifying round Group 1 winners | 7 August 1999 | 3 (1972, 1976, 1996) |
| Indonesia | Qualifying round Group 7 winners | 20 November 1999 | 1 (1996) |
| Uzbekistan | Qualifying round Group 3 winners | 26 November 1999 | 1 (1996) |
| China | Qualifying round Group 9 winners | 29 January 2000 | 6 (1976, 1980, 1984, 1988, 1992, 1996) |
| Kuwait | Qualifying round Group 5 winners | 18 February 2000 | 6 (1972, 1976, **1980**, 1984, 1988, 1996) |
| Japan | Qualifying round Group 10 winners | 20 February 2000 | 3 (1988, **1992**, 1996) |
| Qatar | Qualifying round Group 4 winners | 8 April 2000 | 4 (1980, 1984, 1988, 1992) |
| South Korea | Qualifying round Group 6 winners | 9 April 2000 | 8 (**1956**, **1960**, 1964, 1972, 1980, 1984, 1988, 1996) |
| Thailand | Qualifying round Group 8 winners | 9 April 2000 | 3 (1972, 1992, 1996) |
| Iran | Qualifying round Group 2 winners | 11 April 2000 | 8 (**1968**, **1972**, **1976**, 1980, 1984, 1988, 1992, 1996) |

Notes:

^{1} Bold indicates champion for that year
^{2} Italic indicates host

== Stadiums ==
| 2000 AFC Asian Cup is located in Lebanon | Beirut | Sidon | Tripoli |
|---|---|---|---|
| 2000 AFC Asian Cup is located in Lebanon | Sports City Stadium | Saida Municipal Stadium | International Olympic Stadium |
| 2000 AFC Asian Cup is located in Lebanon | Capacity: 47,799 | Capacity: 22,600 | Capacity: 22,400 |

== Tournament summary ==
Lebanon participated in the country's first ever football competition in the history as host, but began disappointingly, losing 0–4 to Iran. Lebanon sought to reinvigorate the team against Iraq and Thailand, but all ended up in just draws, and Lebanon finished bottom in the group, the first host nation since Qatar 1988 to not progress from the group stage. Iran and Iraq managed to survive in the group A with seven and four points respectively, and Thailand took the third, but did not progress due to inferior points, having won no match in their group. Group B saw South Korea failed to achieve a top two finish, falling behind group winner China and Kuwait, but qualified as the best third place team, with the team's only win was against Indonesia. Indonesia was the only team to not score a single goal in the tournament, being beaten by South Korea and China, and a goalless draw with Kuwait. Group C witnessed Uzbekistan to become the worst-performed team in the tournament, being heavily beaten 1–8 by Japan and 0–5 by defending champions Saudi Arabia. The Japanese scrambled to top the group with a famous 4–1 win over the Saudis, though Saudi Arabia would go on to progress together after an unpromising group stage performance. Qatar, another participant in the group, finished in third and progressed thanked for one point ahead of Thailand, having drawn in all three matches.

The quarter-finals saw Iran lost 1–2 to South Korea by a golden goal of Lee Dong-gook, and the same happened in Saudi Arabia's victory over Kuwait, also by a golden goal of Nawaf Al-Temyat. China and Japan easily passed through their Arab rivals Qatar and Iraq, with 3–1 and 4–1 wins respectively, to set up an entirely East Asian affair in the semi-finals, with Saudi Arabia being the only non-East Asian team to be here. FIFA later investigated claims that Iraq's team were tortured under order by Uday Hussein following their defeat to Japan, with goalkeeper Hashim Hassan, defender Abdul Jaber and forward Qahtan Chatir allegedly being flogged for three days by Uday's security.

The first semi-finals saw Saudi Arabia sealed the victory over the South Koreans, with two goals by Talal Al-Meshal at 76' and 80' meant Lee Dong-gook's late equalizer was too little, too late. Japan beat China in a thriller in Beirut, 3–2, to once again face the Saudis in the final. In the third place match, South Korea won bronze with a 1–0 win over China.

The final in Beirut was filled with majority of Saudi supporters, and was seen as the rematch of the 1992 final and earlier group stage encounter. Hamzah Idris had a chance to take the Saudis ahead of Japan at 10', but he missed the opportunity. Eventually, the missing penalty was what the Saudis regretted the most, because Shigeyoshi Mochizuki, who had accidentally given the Saudis the failed opportunity on the penalty earlier, became the hero of Japan with a goal in 30'. Saudi attempt proved to be fruitless, and Japan won the game by just one goal margin, to conquer its second Asian trophy, repeating Japan's victory over Saudi Arabia eight years ago. Subsequently, Japan, the winner, automatically qualified for the 2004 AFC Asian Cup.

== First round ==
All times are Lebanon summer time (UTC+3).

=== Group A ===
| Pos | Team | Pld | W | D | L | GF | GA | GD | Pts | Qualification |
|---|---|---|---|---|---|---|---|---|---|---|
| 1 | Iran | 3 | 2 | 1 | 0 | 6 | 1 | +5 | 7 | Advance to knockout stage |
| 2 | Iraq | 3 | 1 | 1 | 1 | 4 | 3 | +1 | 4 | Advance to knockout stage |
| 3 | Thailand | 3 | 0 | 2 | 1 | 2 | 4 | −2 | 2 | |
| 4 | Lebanon (H) | 3 | 0 | 2 | 1 | 3 | 7 | −4 | 2 | |

Source: RSSSF
(H) Hosts
12 October 2000
15:00

| Iraq | 2–0 | Thailand |
|---|---|---|
| Chathir 27'; Mahmoud 60' | Report |

Saida Municipal Stadium, Sidon
Attendance: 1,500
Referee: Toru Kamikawa (Japan)
12 October 2000
20:45

| Lebanon | 0–4 | Iran |
|---|---|---|
| | Report | Bagheri 19'; Estili 75', 87'; Daei 90+1' |

Sports City Stadium, Beirut
Attendance: 52,418
Referee: Lu Jun (China)

15 October 2000
17:00

| Iran | 1–1 | Thailand |
|---|---|---|
| Daei 73' | Report | Sakesan 12' |

Sports City Stadium, Beirut
Attendance: 17,000
Referee: Saad Kamil Al-Fadhli (Kuwait)
15 October 2000
19:45

| Lebanon | 2–2 | Iraq |
|---|---|---|
| Chahrour 28'; Hojeij 76' | Report | Jeayer 5', 22' |

Sports City Stadium, Beirut
Attendance: 25,000
Referee: Kim Young-Joo (South Korea)

18 October 2000
19:30

| Iran | 1–0 | Iraq |
|---|---|---|
| Daei 77' | Report |

Saida Municipal Stadium, Sidon
Attendance: 8,582
Referee: Omer Al-Mehannah (Saudi Arabia)
18 October 2000
19:30

| Lebanon | 1–1 | Thailand |
|---|---|---|
| Fernandes 83' | Report | Sakesan 58' |

Sports City Stadium, Beirut
Attendance: 40,000
Referee: Lu Jun (China)

=== Group B ===
| Pos | Team | Pld | W | D | L | GF | GA | GD | Pts | Qualification |
|---|---|---|---|---|---|---|---|---|---|---|
| 1 | China | 3 | 1 | 2 | 0 | 6 | 2 | +4 | 5 | Advance to knockout stage |
| 2 | Kuwait | 3 | 1 | 2 | 0 | 1 | 0 | +1 | 5 | Advance to knockout stage |
| 3 | South Korea | 3 | 1 | 1 | 1 | 5 | 3 | +2 | 4 | Advance to knockout stage |
| 4 | Indonesia | 3 | 0 | 1 | 2 | 0 | 7 | −7 | 1 | |

Source: RSSSF
13 October 2000
17:00

| South Korea | 2–2 | China |
|---|---|---|
| Lee Young-pyo 30'; Noh Jung-yoon 58' | Report | Ma Mingyu 35'; Fan Zhiyi 66' (pen.) |

International Olympic Stadium, Tripoli
Attendance: 1,000
Referee: Omer Al-Mehannah (Saudi Arabia)
13 October 2000
19:45

| Kuwait | 0–0 | Indonesia |
|---|---|---|
| | Report |

International Olympic Stadium, Tripoli
Attendance: 2,000
Referee: Tajaddin Fares (Syria)

16 October 2000
17:00

| China | 4–0 | Indonesia |
|---|---|---|
| Li Ming 2'; Shen Si 7' (pen.); Yang Chen 10'; Qi Hong 90' | Report |

International Olympic Stadium, Tripoli
Attendance: 2,000
Referee: Nabil Ayad (Lebanon)
16 October 2000
19:45

| South Korea | 0–1 | Kuwait |
|---|---|---|
| | Report | Al-Huwaidi 43' |

International Olympic Stadium, Tripoli
Attendance: 7,000
Referee: Brian Hall (United States)

19 October 2000
19:30

| China | 0–0 | Kuwait |
|---|---|---|
| | Report |

International Olympic Stadium, Tripoli
Attendance: 5,000
Referee: Shamsul Maidin (Singapore)
19 October 2000
19:30

| South Korea | 3–0 | Indonesia |
|---|---|---|
| Lee Dong-gook 30', 76', 90+1' | Report |

Sports City Stadium, Beirut
Attendance: 500
Referee: Toru Kamikawa (Japan)

=== Group C ===
| Pos | Team | Pld | W | D | L | GF | GA | GD | Pts | Qualification |
|---|---|---|---|---|---|---|---|---|---|---|
| 1 | Japan | 3 | 2 | 1 | 0 | 13 | 3 | +10 | 7 | Advance to knockout stage |
| 2 | Saudi Arabia | 3 | 1 | 1 | 1 | 6 | 4 | +2 | 4 | Advance to knockout stage |
| 3 | Qatar | 3 | 0 | 3 | 0 | 2 | 2 | 0 | 3 | Advance to knockout stage |
| 4 | Uzbekistan | 3 | 0 | 1 | 2 | 2 | 14 | −12 | 1 | |

Source: RSSSF
14 October 2000
17:00

| Saudi Arabia | 1–4 | Japan |
|---|---|---|
| Morioka 90+1' (o.g.) | Report | Yanagisawa 26'; Takahara 39'; Nanami 54'; Ono 90' |

Saida Municipal Stadium, Sidon
Attendance: 5,000
Referee: Ali Bujsaim (United Arab Emirates)
14 October 2000
19:45

| Qatar | 1–1 | Uzbekistan |
|---|---|---|
| Gholam 61' | Report | Qosimov 73' |

Saida Municipal Stadium, Sidon
Attendance: 7,000
Referee: Mohd Nazri Abdullah (Malaysia)

17 October 2000
17:00

| Japan | 8–1 | Uzbekistan |
|---|---|---|
| Morishima 7'; Nishizawa 14', 25', 49'; Takahara 18', 20', 57'; Kitajima 79' | Report | Lushan 29' |

Saida Municipal Stadium, Sidon
Attendance: 2,000
Referee: Shamsul Maidin (Singapore)
17 October 2000
19:45

| Saudi Arabia | 0–0 | Qatar |
|---|---|---|
| | Report |

Saida Municipal Stadium, Sidon
Attendance: 5,000
Referee: Tajaddin Fares (Syria)

20 October 2000
19:30

| Saudi Arabia | 5–0 | Uzbekistan |
|---|---|---|
| Al-Otaibi 18'; Al-Shalhoub 35', 78', 86'; Al-Temyat 88' | Report |

Saida Municipal Stadium, Sidon
Attendance: 2,000
Referee: Kim Young-Joo (South Korea)
20 October 2000
19:30

| Japan | 1–1 | Qatar |
|---|---|---|
| Nishizawa 61' | Report | Al-Obaidly 22' |

Sports City Stadium, Beirut
Attendance: 1,000
Referee: Nabil Ayad (Lebanon)

=== Third-placed qualifiers ===
At the end of the first stage, a comparison was made between the third placed teams of each group. The two best third-placed teams advanced to the quarter-finals.

| Pos | Team | Pld | W | D | L | GF | GA | GD | Pts | Qualification |
|---|---|---|---|---|---|---|---|---|---|---|
| 1 | South Korea | 3 | 1 | 1 | 1 | 5 | 3 | +2 | 4 | Advance to knockout stage |
| 2 | Qatar | 3 | 0 | 3 | 0 | 2 | 2 | 0 | 3 | Advance to knockout stage |
| 3 | Thailand | 3 | 0 | 2 | 1 | 2 | 4 | −2 | 2 | |

Source: RSSSF

South Korea and Qatar, the two best third-placed teams, qualified for the quarter-finals.

== Knockout stage ==
All times are Lebanon summer time (UTC+3)

Extra times were played under the golden goal rule.

Quarter-finals
23 October – Sidon
China | 3
Qatar | 1
24 October – Beirut
Japan | 4
Iraq | 1
23 October – Tripoli
Iran | 1
South Korea (a.e.t.) | 2
24 October – Beirut
Kuwait | 2
Saudi Arabia (a.e.t.) | 3

Semi-finals
26 October – Beirut
China | 2
Japan | 3
26 October – Beirut
South Korea | 1
Saudi Arabia | 2

Final
29 October – Beirut
Japan | 1
Saudi Arabia | 0
Third place
29 October – Beirut
China | 0
South Korea | 1

=== Quarter-finals ===
23 October 2000
16:45

| Iran | 1–2 (a.e.t./g.g.) | South Korea |
|---|---|---|
| Bagheri 71' | Report | Kim Sang-sik 90'; Lee Dong-gook 99' |

International Olympic Stadium, Tripoli
Attendance: 2,000
Referee: Ali Bujsaim (United Arab Emirates)

23 October 2000
19:45

| China | 3–1 | Qatar |
|---|---|---|
| Li Ming 9'; Qi Hong 38'; Yang Chen 54' | Report | Al-Enazi 65' |

Saida Municipal Stadium, Sidon
Attendance: 3,000
Referee: Mohd Nazri Abdullah (Malaysia)

24 October 2000
16:45

| Japan | 4–1 | Iraq |
|---|---|---|
| Nanami 8', 29'; Takahara 11'; Myojin 62' | Report | Obeid 4' |

Sports City Stadium, Beirut
Attendance: 2,000
Referee: Tajaddin Fares (Syria)

24 October 2000
19:45

| Kuwait | 2–3 (a.e.t./g.g.) | Saudi Arabia |
|---|---|---|
| Bashar Abdullah 62'; Al-Huwaidi 68' | Report | Al-Temyat 45+1' 109'; Al-Meshal 72' |

Sports City Stadium, Beirut
Attendance: 5,000
Referee: Brian Hall (United States)

=== Semi-finals ===
26 October 2000
16:45

| South Korea | 1–2 | Saudi Arabia |
|---|---|---|
| Lee Dong-gook 90+1' | Report | Al-Meshal 76', 80' |

Sports City Stadium, Beirut
Attendance: 3,000
Referee: Saad Kamil Al-Fadhli (Kuwait)

26 October 2000
19:45

| China | 2–3 | Japan |
|---|---|---|
| Qi Hong 30'; Yang Chen 48' | Report | Fan Zhiyi 21' (o.g.); Nishizawa 53'; Myojin 61' |

Sports City Stadium, Beirut
Attendance: 3,500
Referee: Shamsul Maidin (Singapore)

=== Third place play-off ===
29 October 2000
17:00

| South Korea | 1–0 | China |
|---|---|---|
| Lee Dong-gook 76' | Report |

Sports City Stadium, Beirut
Attendance: 20,000
Referee: Nabil Ayad (Lebanon)

=== Final ===
29 October 2000
19:45

| Japan | 1–0 | Saudi Arabia |
|---|---|---|
| Mochizuki 30' | Report |

Sports City Stadium, Beirut
Attendance: 47,400
Referee: Ali Bujsaim (United Arab Emirates)

== Statistics ==
=== Goalscorers ===
With six goals, Lee Dong-Gook is the top scorer in the tournament. In total, 77 goals were scored by 43 different players, with two of them credited as own goals.

6 goals

- (South Korea) Lee Dong-gook

5 goals

- (Japan) Akinori Nishizawa
- (Japan) Naohiro Takahara

3 goals

- (China) Qi Hong
- (China) Yang Chen
- (Iran) Ali Daei
- (Japan) Hiroshi Nanami
- (Saudi Arabia) Talal Al-Meshal
- (Saudi Arabia) Mohammad Al-Shalhoub
- (Saudi Arabia) Nawaf Al-Temyat

2 goals

- (China) Li Ming
- (Iran) Karim Bagheri
- (Iran) Hamid Estili
- (Iraq) Sabah Jeayer
- (Japan) Tomokazu Myojin
- (Kuwait) Jasem Al-Huwaidi
- (Thailand) Sakesan Pituratana

1 goal

- (China) Fan Zhiyi
- (China) Shen Si
- (China) Ma Mingyu
- (Iraq) Qahtan Chathir
- (Iraq) Abbas Obeid
- (Iraq) Haidar Mahmoud
- (Japan) Hideaki Kitajima
- (Japan) Shigeyoshi Mochizuki
- (Japan) Hiroaki Morishima
- (Japan) Shinji Ono
- (Japan) Atsushi Yanagisawa
- (South Korea) Kim Sang-sik
- (South Korea) Lee Young-pyo
- (South Korea) Noh Jung-yoon
- (Kuwait) Bashar Abdullah
- (Lebanon) Abbas Chahrour
- (Lebanon) Luís Fernandes
- (Lebanon) Moussa Hojeij
- (Qatar) Mohammed Salem Al-Enazi
- (Qatar) Abdulnasser Al-Obaidly
- (Qatar) Mohammed Gholam
- (Saudi Arabia) Marzouk Al-Otaibi
- (Uzbekistan) Sergey Lushan
- (Uzbekistan) Mirjalol Qosimov

Own goal

- (China) Fan Zhiyi (for Japan)
- (Japan) Ryuzo Morioka (for Saudi Arabia)

=== Awards ===
Most Valuable Player

- (Japan) Hiroshi Nanami

Top scorer

- (South Korea) Lee Dong-gook

Best Defender

- (Japan) Ryuzo Morioka

Best Goalkeeper

- (China) Jiang Jin

Fair Play Award

- Saudi Arabia

Team of the Tournament

| Goalkeepers | Defenders | Midfielders | Forwards |
|---|---|---|---|
| (China) Jiang Jin | (South Korea) Hong Myung-bo (Saudi Arabia) Mohammed Al-Khilaiwi (Kuwait) Jamal Mubarak | (Japan) Hiroshi Nanami (Saudi Arabia) Nawaf Al-Temyat (Iraq) Abbas Obeid (Iran) Karim Bagheri (Japan) Shunsuke Nakamura | (South Korea) Lee Dong-gook (Japan) Naohiro Takahara |
