= 1997 FIFA Confederations Cup Group B =

Football tournament group stage

Group B of the 1997 FIFA Confederations Cup took place between 13 and 17 December 1997. Uruguay won the group, and advanced to the knockout stage, along with group runners-up Czech Republic. United Arab Emirates and South Africa failed to advance.

== Standings ==
Pos	Team	Pld	W	D	L	GF	GA	GD	Pts	Qualification
1	Uruguay	3	3	0	0	8	4	+4	9	Advanced to knockout stage
2	Czech Republic	3	1	1	1	9	5	+4	4	Advanced to knockout stage
3	United Arab Emirates	3	1	0	2	2	8	−6	3	
4	South Africa	3	0	1	2	5	7	−2	1	

Source: RSSSF

== Results ==
=== United Arab Emirates v Uruguay ===
13 December 1997
17:50 AST

United Arab Emirates	0–2	Uruguay
	Report	Olivera 45+2'; Pacheco 90+2'

King Fahd II Stadium, Riyadh
Attendance: 13,000
Referee: Ramesh Ramdhan (Trinidad and Tobago)

United Arab Emirates	Uruguay

UNITED ARAB EMIRATES:
GK	17	Muhsin Musabah
DF	5	Hassan Mubarak
DF	6	Ismail Rashid Ismail
DF	20	Mohamed Obaid
MF	7	Saad Bakheet Mubarak
MF	13	Abdulsalam Jumaa		(substituted off) 84'
MF	15	Abdulaziz Mohamed		(substituted off) 73'
MF	16	Ahmed Saeed
MF	19	Gholam Ali		(substituted off) 73'
FW	8	Ahmed Adel	(yellow card) 28'
FW	11	Yaser Salem Ali
Substitutions:
FW	10	Adnan Al Talyani		(substituted on) 73'
FW	14	Khamees Saad Mubarak		(substituted on) 73'
DF	3	Munther Abdullah		(substituted on) 84'
Manager:
(Czech Republic) Milan Máčala

URUGUAY:
GK	12	Claudio Flores
DF	2	Diego López
DF	3	Paolo Montero
DF	4	Gustavo Méndez
DF	6	Edgardo Adinolfi
MF	5	Gonzalo de los Santos
MF	7	Pablo García
MF	8	Líber Vespa	(substituted off) 89'
MF	20	Álvaro Recoba	(substituted off) 54'
FW	9	Marcelo Zalayeta
FW	10	Nicolás Olivera	(substituted off) 75'
Substitutions:
FW	11	Darío Silva	(substituted on) 54'
FW	19	Antonio Pacheco	(substituted on) 75'
DF	13	Pablo Hernández	(substituted on) 89'
Manager:
Víctor Púa

=== South Africa v Czech Republic ===
13 December 1997
20:00 AST

South Africa	2–2	Czech Republic
Augustine 39'; Mkhalele 86'	Report	Šmicer 19', 40'

King Fahd II Stadium, Riyadh
Attendance: 7,500
Referee: Javier Castrilli (Argentina)

South Africa	Czech Republic

SOUTH AFRICA:
GK	1	Andre Arendse
DF	2	Sizwe Motaung
DF	4	Willem Jackson
DF	5	Mark Fish
DF	9	Neil Tovey
MF	10	John Moshoeu
MF	11	Helman Mkhalele
MF	15	Doctor Khumalo		(substituted off) 37'
MF	18	John Moeti
FW	6	Phil Masinga	(yellow card) 45'
FW	12	Brendan Augustine		(substituted off) 74'
Substitutions:
MF	8	Dumisa Ngobe		(substituted on) 37'
MF	14	Mark Williams		(substituted on) 74'
Manager:
Clive Barker

CZECH REPUBLIC:
GK	1	Pavel Srníček
DF	5	Michal Horňák
DF	12	Karel Rada
DF	13	Petr Vlček	(yellow card) 9'
DF	15	Edvard Lasota
MF	4	Pavel Nedvěd
MF	6	Zdeněk Svoboda
MF	7	Jiří Němec	(yellow card) 75' (yellow-red card) 82'
MF	11	Radek Bejbl
MF	17	Vladimír Šmicer		(substituted off) 83'
FW	9	Pavel Kuka		(substituted off) 90'
Substitutions:
FW	8	Karel Poborský		(substituted on) 83'
MF	14	Radek Slončík		(substituted on) 90'
Manager:
Dušan Uhrin

=== United Arab Emirates v South Africa ===
15 December 1997
17:50 AST

United Arab Emirates	1–0	South Africa
H. Mubarak 5'	Report

King Fahd II Stadium, Riyadh
Attendance: 11,000
Referee: René Ortubé (Bolivia)

United Arab Emirates	South Africa

UNITED ARAB EMIRATES:
GK	17	Muhsin Musabah	(yellow card) 81'
DF	5	Hassan Mubarak
DF	6	Ismail Rashid Ismail
DF	20	Mohamed Obaid	(yellow card) 44'
MF	7	Saad Bakheet Mubarak
MF	15	Abdulaziz Mohamed		(substituted off) 70'
MF	16	Ahmed Saeed
MF	19	Gholam Ali		(substituted off) 81'
FW	8	Ahmed Adel
FW	10	Adnan Al Talyani		(substituted off) 70'
FW	11	Yaser Salem Ali
Substitutions:
MF	13	Abdulsalam Jumaa		(substituted on) 70'
FW	14	Khamees Saad Mubarak		(substituted on) 70'
DF	3	Munther Abdullah		(substituted on) 81'
Manager:
(Czech Republic) Milan Máčala

SOUTH AFRICA:
GK	1	Andre Arendse
DF	2	Sizwe Motaung
DF	4	Willem Jackson	(substituted off) 46'
DF	5	Mark Fish
DF	9	Neil Tovey
MF	8	Dumisa Ngobe
MF	10	John Moshoeu
MF	11	Helman Mkhalele
MF	18	John Moeti	(substituted off) 82'
FW	6	Phil Masinga
FW	12	Brendan Augustine	(substituted off) 75'
Substitutions:
DF	3	David Nyathi	(substituted on) 46'
MF	14	Mark Williams	(substituted on) 75'
FW	13	Pollen Ndlanya	(substituted on) 82'
Manager:
Clive Barker

=== Czech Republic v Uruguay ===
15 December 1997
20:00 AST

Czech Republic	1–2	Uruguay
Siegl 89'	Report	Olivera 26'; Zalayeta 88'

King Fahd II Stadium, Riyadh
Attendance: 9,000
Referee: Saad Mane (Kuwait)

Czech Republic	Uruguay

CZECH REPUBLIC:
GK	1	Pavel Srníček
DF	5	Michal Horňák	(yellow card) 19'	(substituted off) 70'
DF	12	Karel Rada	(yellow card) 43'
DF	13	Petr Vlček
DF	15	Edvard Lasota		(substituted off) 46'
MF	4	Pavel Nedvěd	(yellow card) 88'
MF	6	Zdeněk Svoboda	(yellow card) 72'
MF	8	Karel Poborský	(red card) 40'
MF	11	Radek Bejbl
MF	17	Vladimír Šmicer
FW	9	Pavel Kuka		(substituted off) 60'
Substitutions:
MF	19	Martin Frýdek		(substituted on) 46'
FW	10	Horst Siegl		(substituted on) 60'
DF	3	Luboš Kozel		(substituted on) 70'
Manager:
Dušan Uhrin

URUGUAY:
GK	12	Claudio Flores
DF	2	Diego López
DF	3	Paolo Montero	(yellow card) 22'
DF	4	Gustavo Méndez	(yellow card) 45'
DF	6	Edgardo Adinolfi	(yellow card) 54'
MF	5	Gonzalo de los Santos
MF	7	Pablo García
MF	8	Líber Vespa		(substituted off) 87'
FW	9	Marcelo Zalayeta	(yellow card) 69'
FW	10	Nicolás Olivera		(substituted off) 65'
FW	11	Darío Silva	(yellow card) 69'	(substituted off) 77'
Substitutions:
MF	20	Álvaro Recoba		(substituted on) 65'
MF	14	Christian Callejas		(substituted on) 77'
DF	13	Pablo Hernández		(substituted on) 87'
Manager:
Víctor Púa

=== United Arab Emirates v Czech Republic ===
17 December 1997
17:50 AST

United Arab Emirates	1–6	Czech Republic
Al Talyani 78'	Report	Obaid 11' (o.g.); Nedvěd 22', 31'; Šmicer 42', 68', 71'

King Fahd II Stadium, Riyadh
Attendance: 8,000
Referee: René Ortubé (Bolivia)

United Arab Emirates	Czech Republic

UNITED ARAB EMIRATES:
GK	17	Muhsin Musabah
DF	5	Hassan Mubarak
DF	6	Ismail Rashid Ismail	(yellow card) 23'
DF	20	Mohamed Obaid		(substituted off) 46'
MF	7	Saad Bakheet Mubarak
MF	15	Abdulaziz Mohamed
MF	16	Ahmed Saeed
MF	19	Gholam Ali
FW	8	Ahmed Adel	(yellow card) 8'	(substituted off) 58'
FW	10	Adnan Al Talyani
FW	11	Yaser Salem Ali		(substituted off) 46'
Substitutions:
MF	13	Abdulsalam Jumaa		(substituted on) 46'
FW	14	Khamees Saad Mubarak		(substituted on) 46'
DF	3	Munther Abdullah	(yellow card) 84'	(substituted on) 58'
Manager:
(Czech Republic) Milan Máčala

CZECH REPUBLIC:
GK	1	Pavel Srníček
DF	5	Michal Horňák		(substituted off) 65'
DF	12	Karel Rada
DF	13	Petr Vlček
MF	4	Pavel Nedvěd
MF	6	Zdeněk Svoboda
MF	7	Jiří Němec	(yellow card) 21'
MF	11	Radek Bejbl
MF	17	Vladimír Šmicer		(substituted off) 75'
FW	9	Pavel Kuka
FW	10	Horst Siegl		(substituted off) 82'
Substitutions:
DF	15	Edvard Lasota		(substituted on) 65'
DF	2	Ivo Ulich		(substituted on) 75'
FW	16	Vratislav Lokvenc		(substituted on) 82'
Manager:
Dušan Uhrin

=== Uruguay v South Africa ===
17 December 1997
20:00 AST

Uruguay	4–3	South Africa
Silva 12', 66'; Recoba 42'; Callejas 90'	Report	Radebe 11'; Mkhalele 69'; Ndlanya 77'

King Fahd II Stadium, Riyadh
Attendance: 8,000
Referee: Ramesh Ramdhan (Trinidad and Tobago)

Uruguay	South Africa

URUGUAY:
GK	1	Carlos Nicola
DF	2	Diego López	(substituted off) 69'
DF	15	Carlos Díaz
DF	16	César Pellegrín
DF	18	Martín Rivas
MF	13	Pablo Hernández
MF	14	Christian Callejas
MF	17	Fabián Coelho	(substituted off) 79'
MF	20	Álvaro Recoba
FW	11	Darío Silva
FW	19	Antonio Pacheco	(substituted off) 79'
Substitutions:
MF	5	Gonzalo de los Santos	(substituted on) 69'
MF	7	Pablo García	(substituted on) 79'
MF	8	Líber Vespa	(substituted on) 79'
Manager:
Víctor Púa

SOUTH AFRICA:
GK	16	Brian Baloyi
DF	2	Sizwe Motaung		(substituted off) 46'
DF	3	David Nyathi
DF	5	Mark Fish
DF	19	Lucas Radebe
MF	10	John Moshoeu		(substituted off) 77'
MF	11	Helman Mkhalele
MF	18	John Moeti	(yellow card) 20'
MF	20	Eric Tinkler	(yellow card) 54'
FW	6	Phil Masinga
FW	14	Mark Williams		(substituted off) 70'
Substitutions:
DF	4	Willem Jackson		(substituted on) 46'
FW	13	Pollen Ndlanya		(substituted on) 70'
MF	17	Jabulani Mnguni		(substituted on) 77'
Manager:
Clive Barker
