= South Africa national soccer team results (1992–1999) =

This page details the match results and statistics of the South Africa national soccer team from 1992 to 1999.

== Results ==
No.	Date	Venue	Opponents	Score	Competition	Scorers	Att.	Ref.
21	7 July 1992	Kings Park Stadium, Durban (H)	Cameroon	1–0	Friendly	Khumalo 82' pen.	40,000	
22	9 July 1992	Goodwood Showgrounds, Cape Town (H)	Cameroon	1–2	Friendly	Onana 8' o.g.	16,000	
23	11 July 1992	FNB Stadium, Johannesburg (H)	Cameroon	2–2	Friendly	P. Masinga 40', B. Masinga 52'	65,000	
24	16 August 1992	National Sports Stadium, Harare (A)	Zimbabwe	1–4	1994 African Cup of Nations qualification	P. Masinga 21'	50,000	
25	30 August 1992	FNB Stadium, Johannesburg (H)	Zambia	0–1	1994 African Cup of Nations qualification		20,000	
26	10 October 1992	National Stadium, Lagos (A)	Nigeria	0–4	1994 FIFA World Cup qualification		40,738	
27	24 October 1992	FNB Stadium, Johannesburg (H)	Congo	1–0	1994 FIFA World Cup qualification	P. Masinga 27'	25,000	
28	10 January 1993	Botswana National Stadium, Gaborone (A)	Botswana	2–0	Friendly	Seale 58', Moshoeu 86'	20,000	
29	16 January 1993	FNB Stadium, Johannesburg (H)	Nigeria	0–0	1994 FIFA World Cup qualification		70,000	
30	31 January 1993	Stade Municipal, Pointe-Noire (A)	Congo	1–0	1994 FIFA World Cup qualification	Legodi 87'	6,000	
31	11 April 1993	Rand Stadium, Johannesburg (H)	Mauritius	0–0	1994 African Cup of Nations qualification		20,000	
32	24 April 1993	FNB Stadium, Johannesburg (H)	Zimbabwe	1–1	1994 African Cup of Nations qualification	Maponyane 6'	35,000	
33	11 July 1993	Independence Stadium, Lusaka (A)	Zambia	0–3	1994 African Cup of Nations qualification		40,000	
34	25 July 1993	Sir Anerood Jugnauth Stadium, Belle Vue Harel (A)	Mauritius	3–1	1994 African Cup of Nations qualification	Mosimane 31', Augustine 33', P. Masinga 70'	6,000	
35	6 October 1993	Los Angeles Memorial Coliseum, Los Angeles (N)	Mexico	0–4	Friendly		12,578	
36	24 April 1994	Independence Stadium, Mmabatho (H)	Zimbabwe	1–0	Friendly	P. Masinga 76'	25,000	
37	10 May 1994	Ellis Park Stadium, Johannesburg (H)	Zambia	2–1	Nelson Mandela Challenge	Augustine 46', Khumalo 48'	50,000	
38	8 June 1994	Hindmarsh Stadium, Adelaide (A)	Australia	0–1	Friendly		10,203	
39	12 June 1994	Sydney Football Stadium, Sydney (A)	Australia	0–1	Friendly		17,769	
40	4 September 1994	Mahamasina Municipal Stadium, Antananarivo (A)	Madagascar	1–0	1996 African Cup of Nations qualification	P. Masinga 21'	35,000	
41	15 October 1994	Odi Stadium, Mabopane (H)	Mauritius	1–0	1996 African Cup of Nations qualification	P. Masinga 51'	20,000	
42	13 November 1994	Independence Stadium, Lusaka (A)	Zambia	1–1	1996 African Cup of Nations qualification	Khumalo 68'	40,000	
43	26 November 1994	Loftus Versfeld Stadium, Pretoria (H)	Ghana	2–1	1994 Simba 4 Nations Tournament	Maponyane 11', Khumalo 68' pen.	20,000	
44	30 November 1994	Boet Erasmus Stadium, Port Elizabeth (H)	Ivory Coast	0–0	1994 Simba 4 Nations Tournament		35,000	
45	3 December 1994	Ellis Park Stadium, Johannesburg (H)	Cameroon	1–1	1994 Simba 4 Nations Tournament	Motale 48'	30,000	
46	26 April 1995	Setsoto Stadium, Maseru (A)	Lesotho	3–1	Friendly	Khumalo 21', Motale 26', Mkhalele 39'	35,000	
47	13 May 1995	Ellis Park Stadium, Johannesburg (H)	Argentina	1–1	Nelson Mandela Challenge	Khumalo 19'	35,000	
48	30 September 1995	FNB Stadium, Johannesburg (H)	Mozambique	3–2	Friendly	Augustine 52', Mudau 70', Khumalo 86'	40,000	
49	22 November 1995	Loftus Versfeld Stadium, Pretoria (H)	Zambia	2–2	1995 Simba 4 Nations Tournament	Williams 18', 70'	20,000	
50	24 November 1995	Independence Stadium, Mmabatho (H)	Egypt	2–0	1995 Simba 4 Nations Tournament	Mkhalele 14', Bartlett 17'	20,000	
51	26 November 1995	FNB Stadium, Johannesburg (H)	Zimbabwe	2–0	1995 Simba 4 Nations Tournament	Bartlett 20', 78'	25,000	
52	15 December 1995	Johannesburg Stadium, Johannesburg (H)	Germany	0–0	Friendly		25,000	
53	13 January 1996	FNB Stadium, Johannesburg (N)	Cameroon	3–0	1996 African Cup of Nations	P. Masinga 14', Williams 37', Moshoeu 55',	75,000	
54	20 January 1996	FNB Stadium, Johannesburg (N)	Angola	1–0	1996 African Cup of Nations	Williams 57'	40,000	
55	24 January 1996	FNB Stadium, Johannesburg (N)	Egypt	0–1	1996 African Cup of Nations		20,000	
56	27 January 1996	FNB Stadium, Johannesburg (N)	Algeria	2–1	1996 African Cup of Nations	Fish 72', Moshoeu 85'	50,000	
57	31 January 1996	FNB Stadium, Johannesburg (N)	Ghana	3–0	1996 African Cup of Nations	Moshoeu 22', 87', Bartlett 46'	75,000	
58	3 February 1996	FNB Stadium, Johannesburg (N)	Tunisia	2–0	1996 African Cup of Nations	Williams 72', 74'	75,000	
59	24 April 1996	FNB Stadium, Johannesburg (H)	Brazil	2–3	Nelson Mandela Challenge	P. Masinga 25', Khumalo 42'	75,000	
60	1 June 1996	Chichiri Stadium, Blantyre (A)	Malawi	1–0	1998 FIFA World Cup qualification	Tinkler 20'	55,000	
61	15 June 1996	FNB Stadium, Johannesburg (H)	Malawi	3–0	1998 FIFA World Cup qualification	Bartlett 4', 41', Fish 38'	30,000	
62	14 September 1996	Kings Park Stadium, Durban (H)	Kenya	1–0	1996 Simba 4 Nations Tournament	Ngobe 21'	45,000	
63	18 September 1996	Johannesburg Stadium, Johannesburg (H)	Australia	2–0	1996 Simba 4 Nations Tournament	Moshoeu 12', Williams 71',	29,632	
64	21 September 1996	Loftus Versfeld Stadium, Pretoria (H)	Ghana	0–0	1996 Simba 4 Nations Tournament		50,000	
65	9 November 1996	FNB Stadium, Johannesburg (H)	Zaire	1–0	1998 FIFA World Cup qualification	P. Masinga 72'	55,000	
66	11 January 1997	Independence Stadium, Lusaka (A)	Zambia	0–0	1998 FIFA World Cup qualification		27,500	
67	6 April 1997	Stade Municipal, Pointe-Noire (A)	Congo	0–2	1998 FIFA World Cup qualification		25,000	
68	27 April 1997	Stade Municipal, Lomé (N)	Zaire	2–1	1998 FIFA World Cup qualification	Khumalo 21', P. Masinga 66'	7,000	
69	24 May 1997	Old Trafford, Manchester (A)	England	1–2	Friendly	P. Masinga 43'	52,676	
70	4 June 1997	FNB Stadium, Johannesburg (H)	Netherlands	0–2	Nelson Mandela Challenge		25,000	
71	8 June 1997	FNB Stadium, Johannesburg (H)	Zambia	3–0	1998 FIFA World Cup qualification	Mkhalele 9', P. Masinga 16', Williams 74'	56,000	
72	16 August 1997	FNB Stadium, Johannesburg (H)	Congo	1–0	1998 FIFA World Cup qualification	P. Masinga 14'	90,000	
73	11 October 1997	Stade Félix-Bollaert, Lens (A)	France	1–2	Friendly	Bartlett 40'	29,677	
74	15 November 1997	Rheinstadion, Düsseldorf (A)	Germany	0–3	Friendly		27,000	
75	7 December 1997	Ellis Park Stadium, Johannesburg (H)	Brazil	1–2	Friendly	Mkhalele 77'	45,000	
76	13 December 1997	King Fahd International Stadium, Riyadh (N)	Czech Republic	2–2	1997 FIFA Confederations Cup	Augustine 39', Mkhalele 85'	2,500	
77	15 December 1997	King Fahd International Stadium, Riyadh (N)	United Arab Emirates	0–1	1997 FIFA Confederations Cup		2,500	
78	17 December 1997	King Fahd International Stadium, Riyadh (N)	Uruguay	3–4	1997 FIFA Confederations Cup	Radebe 11', Mkhalele 69', Ndlanya 77'	15,000	
79	24 January 1998	Independence Stadium, Windhoek (A)	Namibia	2–3 (a.s.d.e.t.)	1998 COSAFA Cup	Mooki 39', P. Masinga 62'	28,000	
80	8 February 1998	Stade Omnisport, Bobo-Dioulasso (N)	Angola	0–0	1998 African Cup of Nations		10,000	
81	11 February 1998	Stade Omnisport, Bobo-Dioulasso (N)	Ivory Coast	1–1	1998 African Cup of Nations	Mkhalele 8' pen.	20,000	
82	16 February 1998	Stade Omnisport, Bobo-Dioulasso (N)	Namibia	4–1	1998 African Cup of Nations	McCarthy 9', 11', 19', 21'	10,000	
83	22 February 1998	Stade Municipal, Ouagadougou (N)	Morocco	2–1	1998 African Cup of Nations	McCarthy 21', Nyathi 77'	5,000	
84	25 February 1998	Stade du 4 Août, Ouagadougou (N)	DR Congo	2–1 (a.e.t.)	1998 African Cup of Nations	McCarthy 60', 113'	3,500	
85	28 February 1998	Stade du 4 Août, Ouagadougou (N)	Egypt	0–2	1998 African Cup of Nations		50,000	
86	20 May 1998	FNB Stadium, Johannesburg (H)	Zambia	1–1	Friendly	Bartlett 57'	30,000	
87	25 May 1998	Estadio Antonio Vespucio Liberti, Buenos Aires (A)	Argentina	0–2	Friendly		40,000	
88	6 June 1998	Freudenstadt Stadion, Baiersbronn (N)	Iceland	1–1	Friendly	McCarthy 37'	1,200	
89	12 June 1998	Stade Vélodrome, Marseille (N)	France	0–3	1998 FIFA World Cup		60,000	
90	18 June 1998	Stadium de Toulouse, Toulouse (N)	Denmark	1–1	1998 FIFA World Cup	McCarthy 52'	36,500	
91	24 June 1998	Parc Lescure, Bordeaux (N)	Saudi Arabia	2–2	1998 FIFA World Cup	Bartlett 19', 90' pen.	35,200	
92	3 October 1998	FNB Stadium, Johannesburg (H)	Angola	1–0	2000 African Cup of Nations qualification	Bartlett 87'	25,000	
93	19 December 1998	FNB Stadium, Johannesburg (H)	Egypt	2–1	Nelson Mandela Challenge	McCarthy 40', 74'	30,000	
94	23 January 1999	Stade George V, Curepipe (A)	Mauritius	1–1	2000 African Cup of Nations qualification	P. Masinga 44'	2,385	
95	20 February 1999	Botswana National Stadium, Gaborone (A)	Botswana	2–1	1999 COSAFA Cup	Ndlanya 36', Phiri 39'	25,000	
96	27 February 1999	Odi Stadium, Mabopane (H)	Gabon	4–1	2000 African Cup of Nations qualification	Moeti 44', P. Masinga 50', Bartlett 57', McCarthy 80'	50,000	
97	10 April 1999	Stade Omar Bongo, Libreville (A)	Gabon	0–1	2000 African Cup of Nations qualification		40,000	
98	28 April 1999	Parken Stadium, Copenhagen (A)	Denmark	1–1	Friendly	Moshoeu 72'	17,592	
99	6 May 1999	Hasely Crawford Stadium, Port of Spain (A)	Trinidad and Tobago	0–2	Friendly		10,000	
100	9 May 1999	Independence Park, Kingston (A)	Jamaica	1–1	Friendly	Mudau 21'	40,000	
101	5 June 1999	Kings Park Stadium, Durban (H)	Mauritius	2–0	2000 African Cup of Nations qualification	Mngomeni 57', McCarthy 78'	40,000	
102	16 June 1999	FNB Stadium, Johannesburg (H)	Zimbabwe	0–1	Friendly		40,000	
103	20 June 1999	Estádio da Citadela, Luanda (A)	Angola	2–2	2000 African Cup of Nations qualification	Mkhalele 48', Mudau 54'	15,000	
104	31 July 1999	Independence Stadium, Windhoek (A)	Namibia	1–1 (a.e.t.) (1–4 p)	1999 COSAFA Cup	Ndlanya 32'	23,000	
105	18 September 1999	Goodwood Showgrounds, Cape Town (H)	Saudi Arabia	1–0	1997 Afro-Asian Cup of Nations	Ndlanya 48'	20,000	
106	30 September 1999	King Fahd International Stadium, Riyadh (A)	Saudi Arabia	0–0	1997 Afro-Asian Cup of Nations		50,000	
107	27 November 1999	Loftus Versfeld Stadium, Pretoria (H)	Sweden	1–0	Nelson Mandela Challenge	Nomvethe 88'	28,000	
