= 1998 African Cup of Nations final =

- Event: 1998 African Cup of Nations
South Africa	Egypt
(South Africa)	(Egypt)
0	2
- Date: 28 February 1998
- Venue: Stade du 4-Août, Ouagadougou
- Referee: Said Belqola (Morocco)
- Attendance: 40,000

The 1998 African Cup of Nations final was a football match that took place on 28 February 1998 at the Stade du 4-Août in Ouagadougou, Burkina Faso, to determine the winner of the 1998 African Cup of Nations, the football championship of Africa organized by the Confederation of African Football (CAF).

Egypt won the title for the fourth time by beating defending champions South Africa 2–0.

== Route to the final ==
South Africa
Round
Egypt
Opponent
Result
Group stage
Opponent
Result
Angola
0–0
Match 1
Mozambique
2–0
Ivory Coast
1–1
Match 2
Zambia
4–0
Namibia
4–0
Match 3
Morocco
0–1

Team	Pld	W	D	L	GF	GA	GD	Pts
Ivory Coast	3	2	1	0	10	6	+4	7
South Africa	3	1	2	0	5	2	+3	5
Angola	3	0	2	1	5	8	−3	2
Namibia	3	0	1	2	7	11	−4	1

Final standings

Team	Pld	W	D	L	GF	GA	GD	Pts
Morocco	3	2	1	0	5	1	+4	7
Egypt	3	2	0	1	6	1	+5	6
Zambia	3	1	1	1	4	6	−2	4
Mozambique	3	0	0	3	1	8	−7	0

Opponent
Result
Knockout stage
Opponent
Result
Morocco
2–1
Quarter-finals
Ivory Coast
0–0 (a.e.t.) (5–4 p)
DR Congo
2–1 (a.s.d.e.t.)
Semi-finals
Burkina Faso
2–0

== Match details ==
=== Details ===
28 February 1998
16:00

South Africa	0–2	Egypt
	Report	A. Hassan 5'; Mostafa 13'

Stade du 4-Août, Ouagadougou
Attendance: 40,000
Referee: Said Belqola (Morocco)

South Africa	Egypt

GK	1	Brian Baloyi
RB	4	Willem Jackson
CB	19	Lucas Radebe (c)	(yellow card) 44'
CB	5	Mark Fish
LB	2	Andrew Rabutla
DM	18	John Moeti	(yellow card) 79'
RM	12	Brendan Augustine		(substituted off) 48'
LM	11	Helman Mkhalele	(yellow card) 28'
AM	10	John Moshoeu
CF	6	Phil Masinga		(substituted off) 81'
CF	17	Benni McCarthy
Substitutions:
MF	14	Quinton Fortune		(substituted on) 48'
FW	13	Pollen Ndlanya		(substituted on) 81'
Manager:
Jomo Sono

GK	1	Nader El-Sayed
SW	5	Samir Kamouna	(yellow card) 62'
CB	4	Hany Ramzy
CB	2	Abdel-Zaher El-Saqqa
CB	6	Medhat Abdel-Hady
RM	8	Yasser Radwan
CM	14	Hazem Emam		(substituted off) 55'
CM	17	Ahmed Hassan	(yellow card) 55'
LM	3	Mohamed Emara
SS	20	Tarek Mostafa		(substituted off) 78'
CF	9	Hossam Hassan (c)
Substitutions:
MF	10	Abdel Sattar Sabry		(substituted on) 55'
FW	21	Osama Nabieh		(substituted on) 78'
Manager:
Mahmoud El-Gohary
