= 1997 FIFA Confederations Cup knockout stage =

Football tournament knockout stage

The knockout stage of the 1997 FIFA Confederations Cup began on 19 December with the semi-final round, and concluded on 21 December 1997 with the final at the King Fahd II Stadium, Riyadh. The top two teams from each group advanced to the knockout stage to compete in a single-elimination style tournament. A third place match was included and played between the two losing teams of the semi-finals.

In the knockout stage (including the final), if a match was level at the end of 90 minutes, extra time of two periods (15 minutes each) would be played. If the score was still level after extra time, the match would be decided by a penalty shoot-out. Additionally, a golden goal rule was used, according to which if the goal is scored during the extra time, the game ends immediately and the scoring team becomes the winner.

== Qualified teams ==
Group	Winners	Runners-up
A	Brazil	Australia
B	Uruguay	Czech Republic

== Bracket ==
Semi-finals
19 December – Riyadh
Brazil	2
Czech Republic	0
19 December – Riyadh
Uruguay	0
Australia (a.s.d.e.t.)	1

Final
21 December – Riyadh
Brazil	6
Australia	0
Third place
21 December – Riyadh
Czech Republic	1
Uruguay	0

== Semi-finals ==
=== Brazil vs Czech Republic ===
19 December 1997
15:15 AST

Brazil	2–0	Czech Republic
Romário 54'; Ronaldo 83'	Report

King Fahd II Stadium, Riyadh
Attendance: 28,000
Referee: Lucien Bouchardeau (Niger)

Brazil	Czech Republic

BRAZIL:
GK	1	Dida
RB	2	Cafu	(yellow card) 24'
CB	4	Júnior Baiano	(yellow card) 20'	(substituted off) 70'
CB	3	Aldair	(yellow card) 35'
LB	6	Roberto Carlos
CM	5	Dunga (c)	(yellow card) 77'
CM	8	Flávio Conceição		(substituted off) 87'
RAM	19	Juninho
LAM	10	Leonardo		(substituted off) 45'
FW	9	Ronaldo
FW	11	Romário
Substitutions:
MF	18	Denílson		(substituted on) 45'
DF	14	Gonçalves		(substituted on) 70'
MF	16	César Sampaio		(substituted on) 87'
Manager:
Mário Zagallo

CZECH REPUBLIC:
GK	1	Pavel Srníček
DF	5	Michal Horňák		(substituted off) 82'
DF	12	Karel Rada
DF	13	Petr Vlček	(yellow card) 64'
DF	15	Edvard Lasota
MF	4	Pavel Nedvěd	(yellow card) 7'	(substituted off) 73'
MF	6	Zdeněk Svoboda
MF	7	Jiří Němec	(yellow card) 68'
MF	11	Radek Bejbl		(substituted off) 89'
MF	17	Vladimír Šmicer
FW	9	Pavel Kuka
Substitutions:
DF	2	Ivo Ulich		(substituted on) 73'
MF	8	Karel Poborský		(substituted on) 82'
DF	3	Luboš Kozel		(substituted on) 89'
Manager:
Dušan Uhrin

=== Uruguay v Australia ===
19 December 1997
19:00 AST

Uruguay	0–1 (a.e.t./g.g.)	Australia
	Report	Kewell 92'

King Fahd II Stadium, Riyadh
Attendance: 22,000
Referee: Nikolai Levnikov (Russia)

Uruguay	Australia

URUGUAY:
GK	12	Claudio Flores
DF	2	Diego López
DF	3	Paolo Montero
DF	4	Gustavo Méndez	(yellow card) 5'
DF	6	Edgardo Adinolfi
MF	5	Gonzalo de los Santos
MF	7	Pablo García
MF	8	Líber Vespa
MF	20	Álvaro Recoba		(substituted off) 81'
FW	9	Marcelo Zalayeta	(yellow card) 4'
FW	10	Nicolás Olivera
Substitutions:
FW	11	Darío Silva		(substituted on) 81'
Manager:
Víctor Púa

AUSTRALIA:
GK	1	Mark Bosnich
SW	4	Milan Ivanović
CB	5	Alex Tobin (c)
CB	14	Tony Vidmar
CB	21	Kevin Muscat	(yellow card) 28'
RM	8	Craig Foster
CM	6	Ned Zelic
CM	10	Aurelio Vidmar		(substituted off) 80'
LM	3	Stan Lazaridis
FW	9	Mark Viduka
FW	11	Harry Kewell
Substitutions:
MF	15	Josip Skoko		(substituted on) 80'
Manager:
(England) Terry Venables

== Third-place match ==
21 December 1997
17:50 AST

Czech Republic	1–0	Uruguay
Lasota 63'	Report

King Fahd II Stadium, Riyadh
Attendance: 27,000
Referee: Lucien Bouchardeau (Niger)

Czech Republic	Uruguay

CZECH REPUBLIC:
GK	1	Pavel Srníček
DF	7	Jiří Němec	(yellow card) 34'
DF	12	Karel Rada
DF	13	Petr Vlček
DF	18	Milan Fukal	(yellow card) 78'
MF	4	Pavel Nedvěd
MF	6	Zdeněk Svoboda	(yellow card) 29'
MF	11	Radek Bejbl		(substituted off) 58'
MF	17	Vladimír Šmicer		(substituted off) 78'
FW	9	Pavel Kuka
FW	16	Vratislav Lokvenc		(substituted off) 88'
Substitutions:
MF	15	Edvard Lasota		(substituted on) 58'
MF	8	Karel Poborský	(yellow card) 83'	(substituted on) 78'
DF	5	Michal Horňák		(substituted on) 88'
Manager:
Dušan Uhrin

URUGUAY:
GK	12	Claudio Flores
DF	2	Diego López		(substituted off) 67'
DF	3	Paolo Montero
DF	4	Gustavo Méndez
DF	6	Edgardo Adinolfi
MF	5	Gonzalo de los Santos
MF	7	Pablo García
MF	8	Líber Vespa		(substituted off) 79'
MF	20	Álvaro Recoba
FW	9	Marcelo Zalayeta
FW	10	Nicolás Olivera	(yellow card) 35'
Substitutions:
FW	11	Darío Silva	(yellow card) 90'	(substituted on) 79'
DF	13	Pablo Hernández		(substituted on) 67'
Manager:
Víctor Púa

== Final ==
21 December 1997
21:00 AST

Brazil	6–0	Australia
Ronaldo 15', 27', 59'; Romário 38', 53', 75' (pen.)	Report

King Fahd II Stadium, Riyadh
Attendance: 65,000
Referee: Pirom Un-Prasert (Thailand)

Brazil	Australia

GK	1	Dida
RB	2	Cafu
CB	4	Júnior Baiano
CB	3	Aldair
LB	6	Roberto Carlos
CM	5	Dunga (c)
CM	16	César Sampaio
RAM	19	Juninho
LAM	18	Denílson
FW	9	Ronaldo	(yellow card) 72'
FW	11	Romário
Manager:
Mário Zagallo

GK	1	Mark Bosnich
SW	4	Milan Ivanović
RB	14	Tony Vidmar		(substituted off) 31'
CB	5	Alex Tobin (c)
CB	2	Steve Horvat		(substituted off) 55'
LB	3	Stan Lazaridis
CM	8	Craig Foster
CM	6	Ned Zelic
AM	10	Aurelio Vidmar		(substituted off) 31'
CF	9	Mark Viduka	(red card) 24'
CF	11	Harry Kewell
Substitutions:
FW	18	John Aloisi		(substituted on) 31'
DF	21	Kevin Muscat		(substituted on) 31'
DF	12	Matthew Bingley		(substituted on) 55'
Manager:
(England) Terry Venables

OFFICIALS

- Assistant referees:
  - Mohamed Al Musawi (Oman)
  - Jacques Poudevigne (France)
