= South Africa at the FIFA Confederations Cup =

Football tournament results

The South Africa national football team represented South Africa at the FIFA Confederations Cup on two occasions, in 1997 as the champions of 1996 Africa Cup of Nations and 2009 as host of both the tournament and the upcoming 2010 FIFA World Cup.

== FIFA Confederations Cup ==
FIFA Confederations Cup record
Year	Round	Position	Pld	W	D*	L	GF	GA	Squad
(Saudi Arabia) 1992	Banned								
(Saudi Arabia) 1995	Did not qualify								
(Saudi Arabia) 1997	Group Stage	8th	3	0	1	2	5	7	Squad
(Mexico) 1999	Did not qualify								
(South Korea) (Japan) 2001	Did not qualify								
(France) 2003	Did not qualify								
(Germany) 2005	Did not qualify								
(South Africa) 2009	Fourth Place	4th	5	1	1	3	4	6	Squad
(Brazil) 2013	Did not qualify								
(Russia) 2017	Did not qualify								
Total	Third Place	2/10	8	1	2	5	9	13	-

South Africa's Confederations Cup record
First Match	South Africa 2–2 Czech Republic (13 December 1997; Riyadh, Saudi Arabia)
Biggest Win	South Africa 2–0 New Zealand (17 June 2009; Rustenburg, South Africa)
Biggest Defeat	Spain 2–0 South Africa (20 June 2009; Bloemfontein, South Africa)
Best Result	Fourth Place at the 2009 FIFA Confederations Cup
Worst Result	8th place at the 1997 FIFA Confederations Cup

== 1997 FIFA Confederations Cup ==
=== Group B ===
Team	Pld	W	D	L	GF	GA	GD	Pts
Uruguay	3	3	0	0	8	4	+4	9
Czech Republic	3	1	1	1	9	5	+4	4
United Arab Emirates	3	1	0	2	2	8	−6	3
South Africa	3	0	1	2	5	7	−2	1

13 December 1997
20:00 AST

South Africa	2–2	Czech Republic
Augustine 39'; Mkhalele 86'	Report	Šmicer 19', 40'

King Fahd II Stadium, Riyadh
Attendance: 7,500
Referee: Javier Castrilli (Argentina)

15 December 1997
17:50 AST

United Arab Emirates	1–0	South Africa
H. Mubarak 5'	Report

King Fahd II Stadium, Riyadh
Attendance: 11,000
Referee: René Ortubé (Bolivia)

17 December 1997
20:00 AST

Uruguay	4–3	South Africa
Silva 12', 66'; Recoba 42'; Callejas 90'	Report	Radebe 11'; Mkhalele 69'; Ndlanya 77'

King Fahd II Stadium, Riyadh
Attendance: 8,000
Referee: Ramesh Ramdhan (Trinidad and Tobago)

== 2009 FIFA Confederations Cup ==
=== Group A ===
Team	Pld	W	D	L	GF	GA	GD	Pts
Spain	3	3	0	0	8	0	+8	9
South Africa (H)	3	1	1	1	2	2	0	4
Iraq	3	0	2	1	0	1	−1	2
New Zealand	3	0	1	2	0	7	−7	1

14 June 2009
16:00 SAST

South Africa	0–0	Iraq
	Report

Ellis Park Stadium, Johannesburg
Attendance: 48,837
Referee: Jorge Larrionda (Uruguay)

17 June 2009
20:30 SAST

South Africa	2–0	New Zealand
Parker 21', 52'	Report

Royal Bafokeng Stadium, Rustenburg
Attendance: 36,598
Referee: Benito Archundia (Mexico)

20 June 2009
20:30 SAST

Spain	2–0	South Africa
Villa 52'; Llorente 72'	Report

Free State Stadium, Bloemfontein
Attendance: 38,212
Referee: Pablo Pozo (Chile)

=== Knockout stage ===
Semi-finals

25 June 2009
20:30 SAST

Brazil	1–0	South Africa
Dani Alves 88'	Report

Ellis Park Stadium, Johannesburg
Attendance: 48,049
Referee: Massimo Busacca (Switzerland)

Third place play-off

28 June 2009
15:00 SAST

Spain	3–2 (a.e.t.)	South Africa
Güiza 88', 89'; Alonso 107'	Report	Mphela 73', 90+3'

Royal Bafokeng Stadium, Rustenburg
Attendance: 31,788
Referee: Matthew Breeze (Australia)

== Top goalscorers ==
Brendan Augustine was the first player to score for South Africa at the FIFA Confederations Cup in 1997.

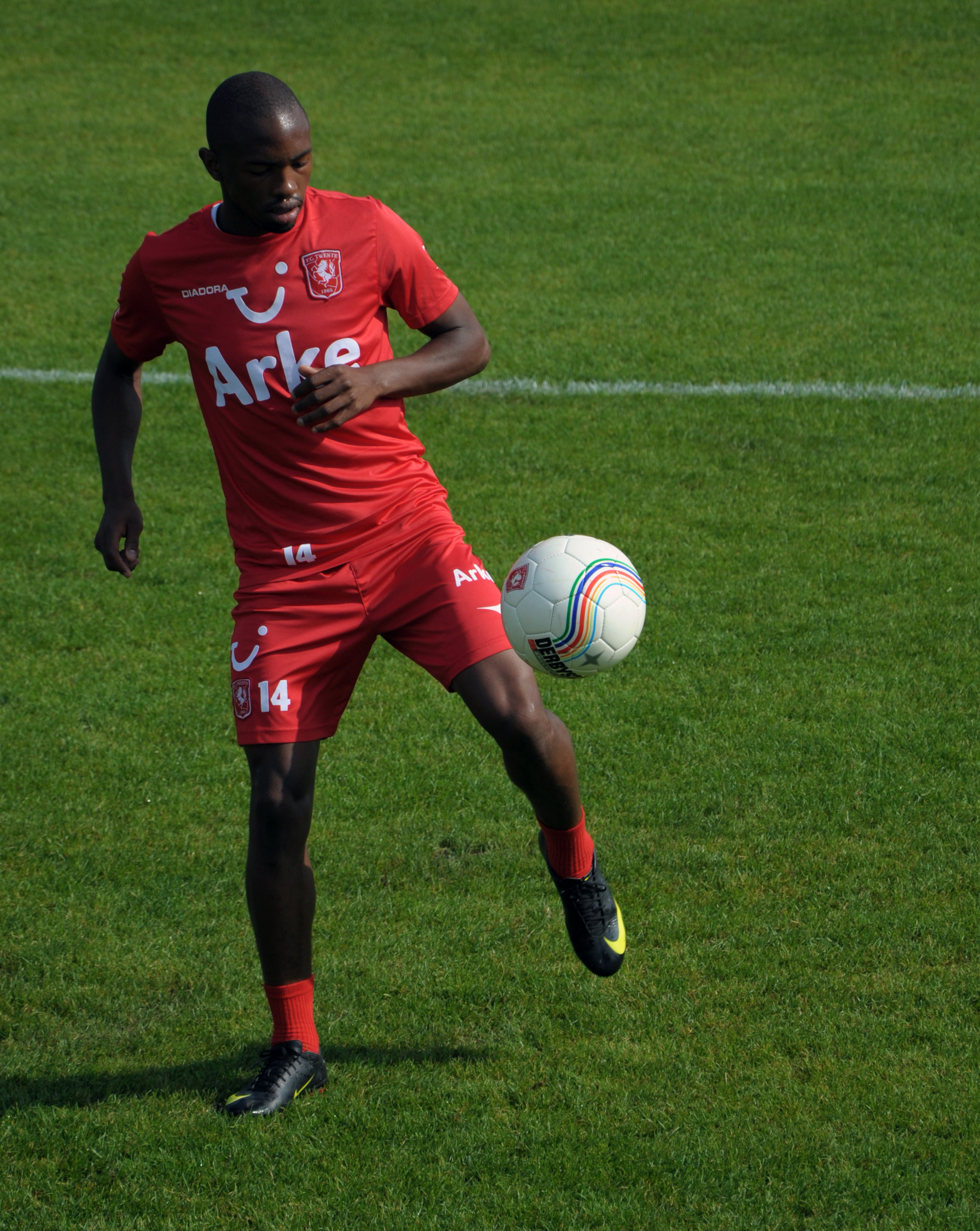
Bernard Parker is the joint top scorer at FIFA Confederations Cups.

No.	Name	Goals	Confederations Cups
1	Helman Mkhalele	2	1997
1	Katlego Mphela	2	2009
1	Bernard Parker	2	2009
4	Brendan Augustine	1	1997
4	Pollen Ndlanya	1	1997
4	Lucas Radebe	1	1997

== See also ==
- South Africa at the Africa Cup of Nations
- South Africa at the CONCACAF Gold Cup
- South Africa at the FIFA World Cup
