= South Africa at the Africa Cup of Nations =

Although the football team for South Africa participated in the Africa Cup of Nations much later than many African countries (the country was scheduled to participate in inaugural 1957 Africa Cup of Nations but was excluded because of apartheid), as they participated for the first time as host of 1996 edition, South Africa has soon established itself as an emerging African power. The first edition South Africa participated was a complete success, with the team conquered their first, and only African trophy, on their debut. Since then, South Africa continues to participate and remains a reckoned force, though success has been elusive since the 2000s. Outside the 1996 edition, South Africa also hosted 2013 Africa Cup of Nations and managed to advance to the quarter-finals. They again reached the quarter-finals in the 2019 edition of the tournament, and finished third at the 2023 tournament.

== Overall record ==
Africa Cup of Nations record
Year	Round	Position	Pld	W	D*	L	GF	GA
(Sudan) 1957	Disqualified due to apartheid							
(United Arab Republic) 1959	Banned							
(Ethiopia) 1962	Banned							
(Ghana) 1963	Banned							
(Tunisia) 1965	Banned							
(Ethiopia) 1968	Banned							
(Sudan) 1970	Banned							
(Cameroon) 1972	Banned							
(Egypt) 1974	Banned							
(Ethiopia) 1976	Banned							
(Ghana) 1978	Banned							
(Nigeria) 1980	Banned							
(Libya) 1982	Banned							
(Ivory Coast) 1984	Banned							
(Egypt) 1986	Banned							
(Morocco) 1988	Banned							
(Algeria) 1990	Banned							
(Senegal) 1992	Banned							
(Tunisia) 1994	Did not qualify							
(South Africa) 1996	Champions	1st	6	5	0	1	11	2
(Burkina Faso) 1998	Runners-up	2nd	6	3	2	1	9	6
(Ghana) (Nigeria) 2000	Third place	3rd	6	3	2	1	8	6
(Mali) 2002	Quarter-finals	6th	4	1	2	1	3	3
(Tunisia) 2004	Group stage	11th	3	1	1	1	3	5
(Egypt) 2006	Group stage	16th	3	0	0	3	0	5
(Ghana) 2008	Group stage	13th	3	0	2	1	3	5
(Angola) 2010	Did not qualify							
(Equatorial Guinea) (Gabon) 2012	Did not qualify							
(South Africa) 2013	Quarter-finals	6th	4	1	2	1	5	3
(Equatorial Guinea) 2015	Group stage	15th	3	0	1	2	3	6
(Gabon) 2017	Did not qualify							
(Egypt) 2019	Quarter-finals	7th	5	2	0	3	3	4
(Cameroon) 2021	Did not qualify							
(Ivory Coast) 2023	Third place	3rd	7	2	4	1	7	3
(Morocco) 2025	Round of 16	10th	4	2	0	2	6	6
(Kenya) (Tanzania) (Uganda) 2027	To be determined							
Total	1 Title	12/35	50	18	16	16	55	48

*Red border colour indicates tournament was held on home soil.

South Africa's Africa Cup of Nations record
First Match	South Africa 3–0 Cameroon (13 January 1996; Johannesburg, South Africa)
Biggest Win	South Africa 4–0 Namibia (21 January 2024; Korhogo, Ivory Coast)
Biggest Defeat	Nigeria 4–0 South Africa (31 January 2004; Monastir, Tunisia)
Best Result	Champions in 1996
Worst Result	16th place in 2006

== Match history ==
Year	Date	Location	Round	Opponent	Result	South Africa scorers
(South Africa) 1996	13 January 1996	Johannesburg	Group stage	Cameroon	3–0	Phil Masinga 15'; Mark Williams 37'; John Moshoeu 55'
(South Africa) 1996	20 January 1996	Johannesburg	Group stage	Angola	1–0	Mark Williams 57'
(South Africa) 1996	24 January 1996	Johannesburg	Group stage	Egypt	0–1	
(South Africa) 1996	27 January 1996	Johannesburg	Quarter-finals	Algeria	2–1	Mark Fish 72'; John Moshoeu 85'
(South Africa) 1996	31 January 1996	Johannesburg	Semi-finals	Ghana	3–0	John Moshoeu 22', 87'; Shaun Bartlett 46'
(South Africa) 1996	3 February 1996	Johannesburg	Final	Tunisia	2–0	Mark Williams 73', 75'
(Burkina Faso) 1998	8 February 1998	Bobo-Dioulasso	Group stage	Angola	0–0	
(Burkina Faso) 1998	11 February 1998	Bobo-Dioulasso	Group stage	Ivory Coast	1–1	Helman Mkhalele 8' (pen.)
(Burkina Faso) 1998	16 February 1998	Bobo-Dioulasso	Group stage	Namibia	4–1	Benni McCarthy 8', 11', 19', 21'
(Burkina Faso) 1998	22 February 1998	Ouagadougou	Quarter-finals	Morocco	2–1	Benni McCarthy 22'; David Nyathi 79'
(Burkina Faso) 1998	25 February 1998	Ouagadougou	Semi-finals	DR Congo	2–1 (a.e.t.)	Benni McCarthy 60', 112'
(Burkina Faso) 1998	28 February 1998	Ouagadougou	Final	Egypt	0–2	
(Ghana) (Nigeria) 2000	23 January 2000	Kumasi	Group stage	Gabon	3–1	Dumisa Ngobe 43'; Shaun Bartlett 55', 78'
(Ghana) (Nigeria) 2000	27 January 2000	Kumasi	Group stage	DR Congo	1–0	Shaun Bartlett 44'
(Ghana) (Nigeria) 2000	2 February 2000	Kumasi	Group stage	Algeria	1–1	Shaun Bartlett 2'
(Ghana) (Nigeria) 2000	6 February 2000	Kumasi	Quarter-finals	Ghana	1–0	Siyabonga Nomvethe 42'
(Ghana) (Nigeria) 2000	10 February 2000	Lagos	Semi-finals	Nigeria	0–2	
(Ghana) (Nigeria) 2000	12 February 2000	Accra	Third place play-off	Tunisia	2–2 (4–3 p)	Shaun Bartlett 11'; Siyabonga Nomvethe 62'
(Mali) 2002	20 January 2002	Ségou	Group stage	Burkina Faso	0–0	
(Mali) 2002	24 January 2002	Ségou	Group stage	Ghana	0–0	
(Mali) 2002	30 January 2002	Ségou	Group stage	Morocco	3–1	Sibusiso Zuma 42'; Thabo Mngomeni 48'; Siyabonga Nomvethe 51'
(Mali) 2002	3 February 2002	Kayes	Quarter-finals	Mali	0–2	
(Tunisia) 2004	27 January 2004	Sfax	Group stage	Benin	2–0	Siyabonga Nomvethe 58', 76'
(Tunisia) 2004	31 January 2004	Monastir	Group stage	Nigeria	0–4	
(Tunisia) 2004	4 February 2004	Sousse	Group stage	Morocco	1–1	Patrick Mayo 29'
(Egypt) 2006	22 January 2006	Alexandria	Group stage	Guinea	0–2	
(Egypt) 2006	26 January 2006	Alexandria	Group stage	Tunisia	0–2	
(Egypt) 2006	30 January 2006	Alexandria	Group stage	Zambia	0–1	
(Ghana) 2008	23 January 2008	Tamale	Group stage	Angola	1–1	Elrio van Heerden 87'
(Ghana) 2008	27 January 2008	Tamale	Group stage	Tunisia	1–3	Katlego Mphela 87'
(Ghana) 2008	31 January 2008	Kumasi	Group stage	Senegal	1–1	Elrio van Heerden 14'
(South Africa) 2013	19 January 2013	Johannesburg	Group stage	Cape Verde	0–0	
(South Africa) 2013	23 January 2013	Durban	Group stage	Angola	2–0	Siyabonga Sangweni 30'; Lehlohonolo Majoro 62'
(South Africa) 2013	27 January 2013	Durban	Group stage	Morocco	2–2	May Mahlangu 71'; Siyabonga Sangweni 86'
(South Africa) 2013	2 February 2013	Durban	Quarter-finals	Mali	1–1 (1–3 p)	Tokelo Rantie 31'
(Equatorial Guinea) 2015	19 January 2015	Mongomo	Group stage	Algeria	1–3	Thuso Phala 51'
(Equatorial Guinea) 2015	23 January 2015	Mongomo	Group stage	Senegal	1–1	Oupa Manyisa 47'
(Equatorial Guinea) 2015	27 January 2015	Mongomo	Group stage	Ghana	1–2	Mandla Masango 17'
(Egypt) 2019	24 June 2019	Cairo	Group stage	Ivory Coast	0–1	
(Egypt) 2019	28 June 2019	Cairo	Group stage	Namibia	1–0	Bongani Zungu 68'
(Egypt) 2019	1 July 2019	Cairo	Group stage	Morocco	0–1	
(Egypt) 2019	6 July 2019	Cairo	Round of 16	Egypt	1–0	Thembinkosi Lorch 85'
(Egypt) 2019	10 July 2019	Cairo	Quarter-finals	Nigeria	1–2	Bongani Zungu 71'
(Ivory Coast) 2023	16 January 2024	Korhogo	Group stage	Mali	0–2	
(Ivory Coast) 2023	21 January 2024	Korhogo	Group stage	Namibia	4–0	Percy Tau 14' (pen.); Themba Zwane 25', 40'; Thapelo Maseko 75'
(Ivory Coast) 2023	24 January 2024	Korhogo	Group stage	Tunisia	0–0	
(Ivory Coast) 2023	30 January 2024	San Pédro	Round of 16	Morocco	2–0	Thapelo Maseko 57'; Teboho Mokoena 90+5'
(Ivory Coast) 2023	3 February 2024	Yamoussoukro	Quarter-finals	Cape Verde	0–0 (2–1 p)	
(Ivory Coast) 2023	7 February 2024	Bouaké	Semi-finals	Nigeria	1–1 (2–4 p)	Teboho Mokoena 90' (pen.)
(Ivory Coast) 2023	10 February 2024	Abidjan	Third place play-off	DR Congo	0–0 (6–5 p)	
2025	22 December 2025	Marrakesh	Group Stage	Angola	2 –1	Oswin Appollis 21'Lyle Foster 79'
2025	26 December 2025	Marrakesh	Group Stage	Egypt	0 –1	
2025	29 December 2025	Marrakesh	Group Stage	Zimbabwe	3 –2	Tshepang Moremi 7'Lyle Foster 50' Oswin Appollis 82' (pen.)
2025	4 January 2026	Rabat	Round of 16	Cameroon	1 –2	Evidence Makgopa 88'

== Top goalscorers ==
Phil Masinga was the first player to score for South Africa on their first ever match at the Africa Cup of Nations (1996), on their 3-0 victory against Cameroon at the opening game of the tournament, 13 January 1996, FNB Stadium, Johannesburg.
Benni McCarthy was the first and so far only player to score a hat-trick for South Africa at the tournament (1998), on their 4-0 victory against Namibia, 16 February 1998, Stade Général Aboubacar Sangoulé Lamizana, Bobo-Dioulasso.

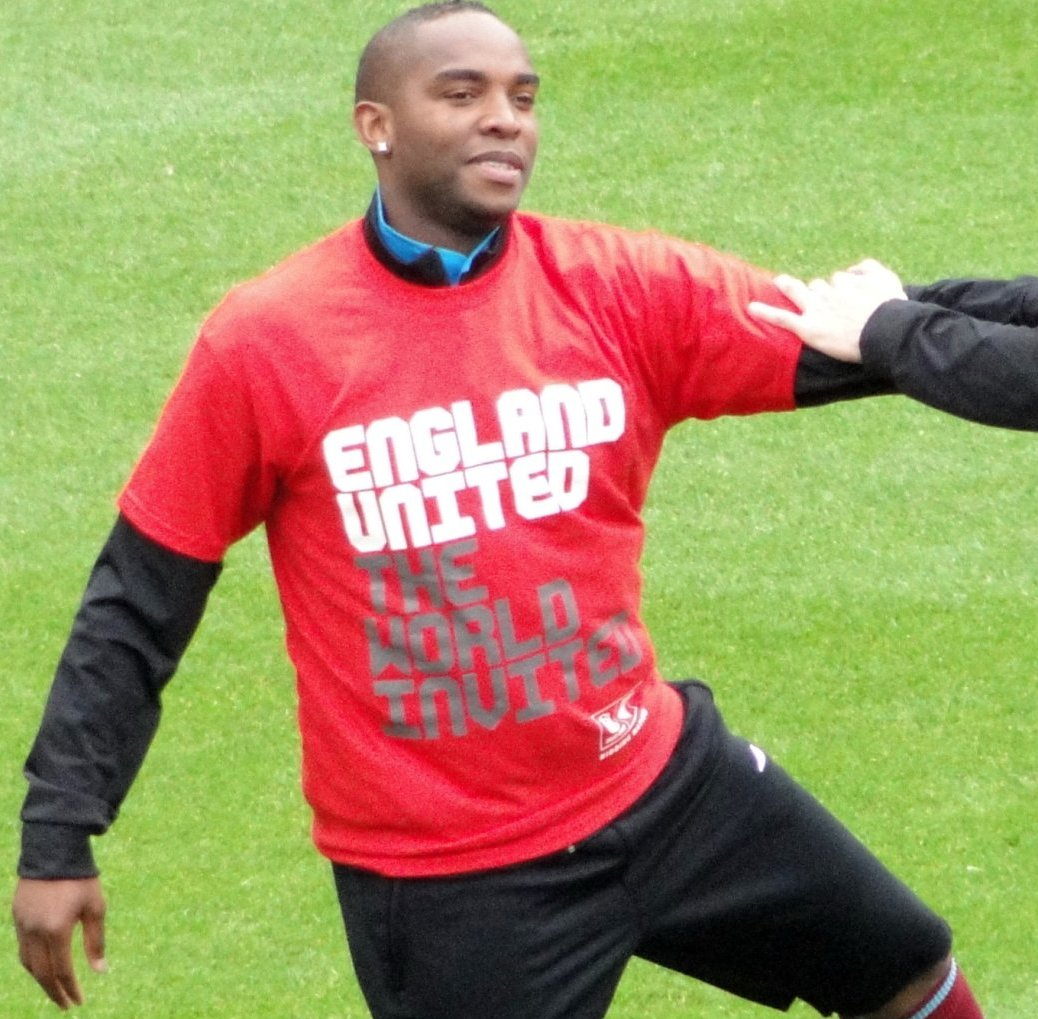
Benni McCarthy is South Africa's all-time top goalscorer at the Africa Cup of Nations.

Rank	Player	Goals	Years (goals)
1	Benni McCarthy	7	1998
2	Shaun Bartlett	6	1996 (1) and 2000 (5)
3	Siyabonga Nomvethe	5	2000 (2), 2002 and 2004 (2)
4	John Moshoeu	4	1996
4	Mark Williams	4	1996

== Squads ==
- 1996 Africa Cup of Nations squad
- 1998 Africa Cup of Nations squad
- 2000 Africa Cup of Nations squad
- 2002 Africa Cup of Nations squad
- 2004 Africa Cup of Nations squad
- 2006 Africa Cup of Nations squad
- 2008 Africa Cup of Nations squad
- 2013 Africa Cup of Nations squad
- 2015 Africa Cup of Nations squad
- 2019 Africa Cup of Nations squad
- 2023 Africa Cup of Nations squad
- 2025 Africa Cup of Nations squad

== See also ==
- South Africa at the CONCACAF Gold Cup
- South Africa at the FIFA Confederations Cup
- South Africa at the FIFA World Cup
