= 1997 FIFA Confederations Cup Group A =

Football tournament group stage

Group A of the 1997 FIFA Confederations Cup took place between 12 and 16 December 1997. Brazil won the group, and advanced to the knockout stage, along with group runners-up Australia. Mexico and Saudi Arabia failed to advance.

== Standings ==
Pos	Team	Pld	W	D	L	GF	GA	GD	Pts	Qualification
1	Brazil	3	2	1	0	6	2	+4	7	Advanced to knockout stage
2	Australia	3	1	1	1	3	2	+1	4	Advanced to knockout stage
3	Mexico	3	1	0	2	8	6	+2	3	
4	Saudi Arabia	3	1	0	2	1	8	−7	3	

Source: RSSSF

== Results ==
=== Saudi Arabia v Brazil ===
12 December 1997
16:15 AST

Saudi Arabia	0–3	Brazil
	Report	César Sampaio 65'; Romário 73', 80'

King Fahd II Stadium, Riyadh
Attendance: 80,000
Referee: Nikolai Levnikov (Russia)

Saudi Arabia	Brazil

SAUDI ARABIA:
GK	1	Mohamed Al-Deayea
DF	2	Mohammed Al-Jahani	(yellow card) 24'
DF	3	Mohammed Al-Khilaiwi
DF	4	Abdullah Zubromawi	(yellow card) 28' (yellow-red card) 64'
DF	13	Hussein Abdulghani
MF	6	Ibrahim Al-Harbi
MF	10	Saeed Al-Owairan		(substituted off) 44'
MF	14	Khalid Al-Muwallid
MF	16	Khamis Al-Dosari
FW	9	Sami Al-Jaber
FW	11	Fahad Al-Mehallel		(substituted off) 63'
Substitutions:
MF	8	Khalid Al-Temawi		(substituted on) 44'
FW	7	Ibrahim Al-Shahrani		(substituted on) 63'
Manager:
(Germany) Otto Pfister

BRAZIL:
GK	1	Dida
RB	2	Cafu	(yellow card) 72'	(substituted off) 75'
CB	4	Júnior Baiano
CB	3	Aldair
LB	15	Zé Roberto
RM	8	Flávio Conceição
CM	16	César Sampaio
LM	18	Denílson		(substituted off) 73'
RF	9	Ronaldo
CF	11	Romário
LF	10	Leonardo (c)		(substituted off) 72'
Substitutions:
MF	19	Juninho		(substituted on) 72'
MF	20	Rivaldo		(substituted on) 73'
DF	13	Zé Maria		(substituted on) 75'
Manager:
Mário Zagallo

=== Mexico v Australia ===
12 December 1997
19:00 AST

Mexico	1–3	Australia
Hernández 80' (pen.)	Report	Viduka 45'; Aloisi 59'; Mori 90'

King Fahd II Stadium, Riyadh
Attendance: 15,000
Referee: Pirom Un-Prasert (Thailand)

Mexico	Australia

MEXICO:
GK	1	Oswaldo Sánchez
RB	14	Isaac Terrazas	(substituted off) 66'
CB	2	Claudio Suárez
CB	3	Francisco Gabriel	(substituted off) 63'
LB	8	Braulio Luna
RM	13	Pável Pardo
CM	6	Raúl Lara
CM	9	Paulo Chávez	(substituted off) 45'
LM	7	Ramón Ramírez
RF	11	Cuauhtémoc Blanco
LF	20	José Manuel Abundis
Substitutions:
RF	10	Luis García	(substituted on) 45'
LF	15	Luis Hernández	(substituted on) 63'
LB	18	Salvador Carmona	(substituted on) 66'
Manager:
Manuel Lapuente

AUSTRALIA:
GK	20	Zeljko Kalac	(yellow card) 80'
RB	14	Tony Vidmar
CB	2	Steve Horvat
CB	5	Alex Tobin (c)
LB	3	Stan Lazaridis
RM	8	Craig Foster
CM	7	Robbie Slater	(yellow card) 77'	(substituted off) 78'
LM	6	Ned Zelic	(yellow card) 64'
AM	10	Aurelio Vidmar		(substituted off) 46'
FW	9	Mark Viduka		(substituted off) 73'
FW	18	John Aloisi
Substitutions:
DF	13	Robbie Hooker		(substituted on) 46'
FW	17	Damian Mori		(substituted on) 73'
MF	19	Ernie Tapai		(substituted on) 78'
Manager:
(England) Terry Venables

=== Saudi Arabia v Mexico ===
14 December 1997
17:50 AST

Saudi Arabia	0–5	Mexico
	Report	Palencia 20', 62'; Blanco 68', 76'; Luna 75'

King Fahd II Stadium, Riyadh
Attendance: 15,000
Referee: Ian McLeod (South Africa)

Saudi Arabia	Mexico

SAUDI ARABIA:
GK	1	Mohamed Al-Deayea
DF	2	Mohammed Al-Jahani
DF	3	Mohammed Al-Khilaiwi
DF	13	Hussein Abdulghani
DF	17	Mohammad Al-Sahafi
MF	6	Ibrahim Al-Harbi
MF	10	Saeed Al-Owairan		(substituted off) 65'
MF	14	Khaled Al-Muwallid	(yellow card) 51'
MF	16	Khamis Al-Dosari	(yellow card) 48'
FW	9	Sami Al-Jaber
FW	11	Fahad Al-Mehallel
Substitutions:
MF	8	Khalid Al-Temawi		(substituted on) 65'
Manager:
(Germany) Otto Pfister

MEXICO:
GK	1	Oswaldo Sánchez
RB	13	Pável Pardo
CB	2	Claudio Suárez
CB	5	Duilio Davino	(yellow card) 88'
LB	18	Salvador Carmona
RM	9	Paulo Chávez
CM	4	Germán Villa	(yellow card) 77'
CM	6	Raúl Lara		(substituted off) 46'
LM	8	Braulio Luna		(substituted off) 56'
RF	17	Francisco Palencia
LF	11	Cuauhtémoc Blanco
Substitutions:
FW	15	Luis Hernández		(substituted on) 46'
MF	16	Markus López		(substituted on) 56'
Manager:
Manuel Lapuente

=== Australia v Brazil ===
14 December 1997
20:00 AST

Australia	0–0	Brazil
	Report

King Fahd II Stadium, Riyadh
Attendance: 15,000
Referee: Lucien Bouchardeau (Niger)

Australia	Brazil

AUSTRALIA:
GK	1	Mark Bosnich
SW	4	Milan Ivanović
RB	14	Tony Vidmar
CB	2	Steve Horvat	(yellow card) 45'
CB	5	Alex Tobin (c)
LB	3	Stan Lazaridis
CM	6	Ned Zelic
CM	8	Craig Foster
AM	10	Aurelio Vidmar		(substituted off) 60'
FW	9	Mark Viduka		(substituted off) 90'
FW	18	John Aloisi		(substituted off) 70'
Substitutions:
MF	19	Ernie Tapai		(substituted on) 60'
FW	17	Damian Mori	(yellow card) 77'	(substituted on) 70'
DF	12	Matthew Bingley		(substituted on) 90'
Manager:
(England) Terry Venables

BRAZIL:
GK	1	Dida
RB	13	Zé Maria
CB	4	Júnior Baiano
CB	3	Aldair
LB	6	Roberto Carlos
CM	8	Flávio Conceição
CM	16	César Sampaio		(substituted off) 88'
RAM	20	Rivaldo	(yellow card) 38'	(substituted off) 64'
LAM	10	Leonardo (c)
FW	7	Bebeto	(yellow card) 27'
FW	9	Ronaldo
Substitutions:
MF	18	Denílson		(substituted on) 64'
MF	17	Doriva		(substituted on) 88'
Manager:
Mário Zagallo

=== Saudi Arabia v Australia ===
16 December 1997
17:50 AST

Saudi Arabia	1–0	Australia
Al-Khilaiwi 40'	Report

King Fahd II Stadium, Riyadh
Attendance: 55,450
Referee: Javier Castrilli (Argentina)

Saudi Arabia	Australia

SAUDI ARABIA:
GK	1	Mohamed Al-Deayea
DF	3	Mohammed Al-Khilaiwi	(yellow card) 50'
DF	4	Abdullah Zubromawi
DF	12	Ahmed Dokhi
DF	13	Hussein Abdulghani
MF	6	Ibrahim Al-Harbi
MF	10	Saeed Al-Owairan
MF	14	Khaled Al-Muwallid		(substituted off) 77'
MF	16	Khamis Al-Dosari
FW	9	Sami Al-Jaber
FW	11	Fahad Al-Mehallel		(substituted off) 67'
Substitutions:
DF	19	Obeid Al-Dosari		(substituted on) 67'
MF	8	Khalid Al-Temawi		(substituted on) 77'
Manager:
(Germany) Otto Pfister

AUSTRALIA:
GK	1	Mark Bosnich
CB	2	Steve Horvat	(yellow card) 42'
CB	4	Milan Ivanović	(yellow card) 85'
CB	5	Alex Tobin (c)
RM	8	Craig Foster
CM	6	Ned Zelic
CM	15	Josip Skoko		(substituted off) 74'
LM	3	Stan Lazaridis
AM	7	Robbie Slater
FW	17	Damian Mori		(substituted off) 66'
FW	18	John Aloisi		(substituted off) 66'
Substitutions:
FW	9	Mark Viduka		(substituted on) 66'
FW	11	Harry Kewell		(substituted on) 66'
MF	10	Aurelio Vidmar		(substituted on) 74'
Manager:
(England) Terry Venables

=== Brazil v Mexico ===
16 December 1997
20:00 AST

Brazil	3–2	Mexico
Romário 41' (pen.); Denílson 61'; Júnior Baiano 66'	Report	Blanco 51'; Ramírez 90'

King Fahd II Stadium, Riyadh
Attendance: 20,000
Referee: Ian McLeod (South Africa)

Brazil	Mexico

BRAZIL:
GK	1	Dida		(substituted off) 82'
RB	13	Zé Maria
CB	4	Júnior Baiano
CB	3	Aldair
LB	6	Roberto Carlos
CM	5	Dunga (c)	(yellow card) 45'
CM	8	Flávio Conceição
RAM	19	Juninho
LAM	18	Denílson
FW	9	Ronaldo		(substituted off) 46'
FW	11	Romário
Substitutions:
FW	7	Bebeto		(substituted on) 46'
GK	12	Rogério Ceni		(substituted on) 82'
Manager:
Mário Zagallo

MEXICO:
GK	12	Óscar Pérez
RB	13	Pável Pardo
CB	2	Claudio Suárez
CB	3	Francisco Gabriel		(substituted off) 61'
CB	5	Duilio Davino
LB	18	Salvador Carmona
RM	17	Francisco Palencia
CM	6	Raúl Lara
LM	8	Braulio Luna		(substituted off) 46'
RF	15	Luis Hernández
LF	11	Cuauhtémoc Blanco	(yellow card) 41'
Substitutions:
RF	10	Luis García		(substituted on) 61'
LM	7	Ramón Ramírez		(substituted on) 46'
Manager:
Manuel Lapuente
