= William Mokoena =

South African soccer player

Personal information
- Date of birth: 31 March 1975 (age 51)
- Place of birth: Johannesburg, South Africa
- Position: Midfielder

Senior career*
| Years | Team | Apps | (Gls) |
| –1998 | Manning Rangers | | |
| 1998–1999 | Orlando Pirates | | |
| 1999–2000 | AmaZulu | | |
| 2000–2001 | African Wanderers | | |
| 2001–2003 | Moroka Swallows | | |
| 2003–2007 | Black Leopards | | |
| 2007–2008 | Mofolo Leeds | | |
| 2008–2009 | Lusitano | | |

International career
| 1995 | South Africa U23 | 4 | (0) |
| 1998 | South Africa | 0 | (0) |
- * Club domestic league appearances and goals

William Mokoena (born 31 March 1975) is a South African former professional soccer player who played as a midfielder. He was widely known by his nickname Naughty due to frequent misbehaviour, scandals and controversies.

He has played for Manning Rangers, Orlando Pirates and AmaZulu.

== Club career ==
Mokoena was born in Johannesburg.

After being relegated with African Wanderers during 2000–01 season, Mokoena signed for Moroka Swallows.

== International career ==
Mokoena played four matches for South Africa U23 team in 1995. Mokoena was included in the South Africa national football team for the 1998 FIFA World Cup in France but did not play. He chose to return home, along with Brendan Augustine after being fined R100,000 for breaches of discipline after breaking curfew set by coach Philippe Troussier.
