= Mark Fish =

South African footballer (born 1974)

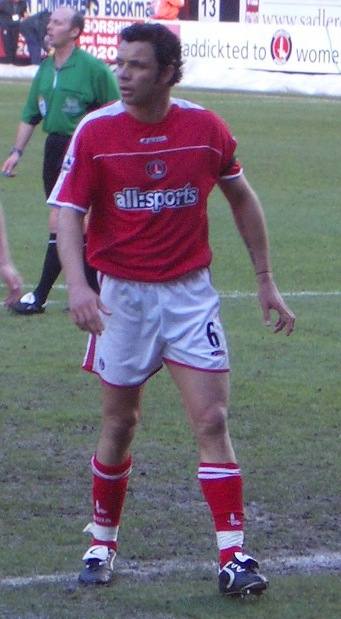
- Fish playing for Charlton Athletic in 2004

Personal information
- Full name: Mark Anthony Fish
- Date of birth: 14 March 1974 (age 52)
- Place of birth: Cape Town, South Africa
- Height: 1.87 m (6 ft 1 1/2 in)
- Position: Defender

Youth career
- Arcadia Shepherds

Senior career*
Years	Team	Apps	(Gls)
1991–1993	Jomo Cosmos	55	(3)
1993–1996	Orlando Pirates	110	(11)
1996–1997	Lazio	15	(1)
1997–2000	Bolton Wanderers	103	(3)
2000–2005	Charlton Athletic	102	(3)
2005	→ Ipswich Town (loan)	1	(0)
2007	Jomo Cosmos	0	(0)
Total		386	(21)

International career
1993–2004	South Africa	62	(2)
Medal record
Men's football
Representing South Africa
Africa Cup of Nations
Winner	1996 South Africa
Runner-up	1998 Burkina Faso
Third place	2000 Ghana–Nigeria
- * Club domestic league appearances and goals

Mark Anthony Fish (born 14 March 1974) is a South African former professional footballer who played as a defender.

Internationally, Fish is best remembered as being a crucial part of South Africa's victorious national soccer squad when they won the 1996 African Cup of Nations. He scored one of the goals in the quarter final against Algeria. He was named to the Team of the Tournament in both the 1996 and 1998 African Cup of Nations. In total he won 62 caps for the South African national team, scoring twice.

== Club career ==
Born in Cape Town, Fish started his career in his native South Africa under the guidance of renowned coach Steve Coetsee, playing for Arcadia Shepherds, an amateur team based at the Caledonian Stadium in Pretoria. He was spotted by then Jomo Cosmos coach Roy Matthews and turned professional as a striker. It was at Cosmos that he was converted into a left-back and went on to become one of the most promising defenders in South Africa at the time.

In 1994, Fish was signed by Orlando Pirates after Cosmos were relegated. At Pirates he arguably played the best football of his career under the tutelage of Mike Makaab. He also won the league championship at Pirates, as well as the BP Top 8 cup in 1994, the 1995 1995 African Champions League and the 1995 Bob Save Super Bowl (then the premier cup in South Africa). He captained The Buccaneers when they beat JS Kabylie in the 1996 CAF Super Cup.

Soon foreign scouts came knocking and he was signed by Lazio of Italy, after he turned down an opportunity to play for his boyhood club, Manchester United. However, he did move to England after just one season at Lazio to become the highest paid player at Bolton Wanderers. Fish was a mainstay in Bolton's back four for much of their first season back in the Premiership, he received praise from both teammates and those whom he played against, most notably Manchester United forward Andy Cole. Despite Fish's efforts Bolton were relegated on the last day of the season despite having accumulated 40 points, normally enough to stave off the drop. Once playing back in the lower leagues Fish applied himself well, quickly gaining a cult status amongst the Bolton faithful, backed up by his nickname "Feesh", and a particularly eyecatching headgear in the shape of a giant Blue fish being made available in club stores. However, new suitors soon came calling, and only after the appointment of Sam Allardyce did Fish's star begin to fall in Lancashire. Fish soon followed his Danish teammate Claus Jensen and at Alan Curbishley's second time of asking moved to Charlton Athletic in a £700,000 move in November 2000. "The Big Fish" as he was affectionately known throughout his playing career went on to make 102 Premiership appearances for the Addicks, scoring three times.

In 2005, he began to fall out of favour at Charlton. He went on to have a short loan spell at Ipswich Town in the 2005–06 season but a severe cruciate ligament injury led to Fish announcing his retirement.

Fish returned to football when he signed a six-month contract with his first club Jomo Cosmos in early 2007 but did not play an official game due to his low level of fitness.

== International career ==
Fish made his international debut for South Africa on 6 October 1993, coming on as a substitute for Donald Khuse in a friendly match against Mexico, which South Africa lost 4–0. Age 19 years and 206 days, he became the youngest player to represent the national team at the time. His record stood until Quinton Fortune surpassed it in 1996, aged 19 years and 116 days. It would turn out to be his only appearance for the year.

He returned to the squad in early 1994 after Clive Barker took charge and gradually became an established member of the side. As hosts, South Africa qualified automatically for the 1996 African Cup of Nations. The youngest member of South Africa's squad at the tournament, Fish appeared in all six matches as the team went on to win the title. South Africa conceded only two goals before the final and kept three cleansheets. In South Africa's opening match, a 3–0 victory over Cameroon, Fish assisted Phil Masinga's goal, the first goal scored by South Africa in a major international tournament. He scored his first international goal in the quarter-final against Algeria, becoming the youngest South African player to score at the tournament. His record was surpassed by Benni McCarthy at the following edition. In the final, South Africa kept a fourth clean sheet with a 2–0 victory over Tunisia to claim their first continental title. Following the tournament, Fish was named in the CAF Team of the Tournament alongside teammate Mark Williams.

His performances at the tournament attracted interest from several European clubs, and he eventually joined Serie A side Lazio after rejecting offers from prominent clubs, including Bayern Munich and Manchester United. Fish also received recognition on the international stage, representing a World XI against Brazil's under-23 team at Giants Stadium in East Rutherford, New Jersey, on 14 July 1996. A year later, he featured for an African XI against a European XI before returning to the side in 1999 to face a World XI.

Fish went on to play a key role in South Africa's qualification for the 1998 FIFA World Cup, starting all but two of their qualifying matches. He scored in a 3–0 victory over Malawi, helping South Africa secure a 4–0 aggregate win in the preliminary round. During a subsequent qualifier against Congo on 6 April 1997, Fish sustained a deep cut to his forehead but continued playing with his head bandaged. South Africa lost 2–0, leaving qualification dependent on the return fixture against the same opponents at FNB Stadium four months later. South Africa won 1–0 through a long-range strike by Phil Masinga, securing their first appearance at the FIFA World Cup.

As African champions, South Africa qualified for the 1997 FIFA Confederations Cup in Saudi Arabia, where Fish was again selected by Barker. However, Bafana Bafana were eliminated in the group stage after conceding seven goals in three matches against the Czech Republic, the United Arab Emirates and Uruguay.

In January 1998, he participated in the 1998 COSAFA Cup, a regional international football tournament held as a warm-up for the 1998 African Cup of Nations. South Africa entered the 1998 African Cup of Nations in Burkina Faso as defending champions. They began the group stage with two draws, putting their chances of reaching the knockout stage in doubt. A 4–1 victory over Namibia in their final group match, in which Benni McCarthy scored all four goals, secured their progression. Fish was replaced by Themba Mnguni in the starting line-up, ending his run of eight consecutive Africa Cup of Nations appearances, a record he shared with John Moshoeu for the most consecutive appearances by a South African player at the tournament. He was restored to the starting line-up for the quarter-final against Morocco, which South Africa won 2–1. A 2–1 victory over the Democratic Republic of the Congo after extra time in the semi-finals sent South Africa to their second consecutive final, where they lost 2–0 to Egypt. Fish was nevertheless named in the Team of the Tournament for the second successive edition.

Later that year, Fish was included in South Africa's squad for their first FIFA World Cup, held in France. He made his tournament debut in a 3–0 defeat to the hosts on 12 June and also featured in the 1–1 draw against Denmark. South Africa drew their final group match against Saudi Arabia, finishing third in their group and failing to advance to the knockout stage. The 1998 tournament was the only FIFA World Cup in which Fish represented South Africa.

Following the World Cup, Trott Moloto took charge of the national team and continued to select Fish despite reports of friction between them. Under Moloto, Fish was deployed on the right of a three-man defence, a tactical change that attracted criticism. Fish won his 50th cap against Mauritius in June 1999, becoming the youngest South African player to reach the milestone before being surpassed six years later by Aaron Mokoena, who was in the early stages of his own international career when Fish set the landmark.

Fish made his third and final appearance at the Africa Cup of Nations finals in 2000, co-hosted by Ghana and Nigeria, where he served as vice-captain. South Africa reached the semi-finals for the third consecutive tournament but lost 2–0 to Nigeria. They subsequently secured third place by defeating Tunisia on penalties, although Fish did not feature in the match. Regardless, he finished his Africa Cup of Nations career with 16 appearances, placing him joint-second among South African players alongside Helman Mkhalele, behind Lucas Radebe and John Moshoeu at the time. Back home in South Africa, Fish faced criticism as all four goals conceded by South Africa during the tournament had originated from attacks down his right flank.

Following the tournament, Fish announced his retirement from international football, citing dissatisfaction with the South African Football Association. Six months later, however, he reversed his decision and returned to the national team under Moloto, playing in an Africa Cup of Nations qualifier against the Republic of the Congo on 3 September 2000.

== Personal life ==
In August 2008, Fish's wife and his son were at their Pretoria home with friends when five armed men robbed their house.

== Career statistics ==
=== International ===
Appearances and goals by national team and year
National team	Year	Apps	Goals
South Africa	1993	1	0
South Africa	1994	6	0
South Africa	1995	4	0
South Africa	1996	10	2
South Africa	1997	10	0
South Africa	1998	14	0
South Africa	1999	8	0
South Africa	2000	7	0
South Africa	2004	2	0
Total		62	2

Scores and results list South Africa's goal tally first, score column indicates score after each Fish goal.

List of international goals scored by Mark Fish
No.	Date	Venue	Opponent	Score	Result	Competition	Ref.
1	27 January 1996	FNB Stadium, Johannesburg, South Africa	Algeria	1–0	2–1	1996 African Cup of Nations	
2	15 June 1996	FNB Stadium, Johannesburg, South Africa	Malawi	2–0	3–0	1998 FIFA World Cup qualification	

== Honours ==
Orlando Pirates

- National Soccer League: 1994
- Bob Save Super Bowl: 1996
- BP Top Eight Cup: 1996
- African Cup of Champions Clubs: 1995
- CAF Super Cup: 1996

South Africa

- African Cup of Nations: 1996; runner-up: 1998; third place: 2000
