= Bennett Masinga =

South African soccer player (1965–2013)

Personal information
- Date of birth: 14 January 1965
- Place of birth: Klerksdorp, South Africa
- Date of death: 14 November 2013 (aged 48)
- Place of death: Stilfontein, South Africa
- Position: Forward

Senior career*
Years	Team	Apps	(Gls)
1983–1987	Klerksdorp City		
1987–1996	Mamelodi Sundowns	476	(127)
1996–1999	Seven Stars		
1999–2000	Santos Cape Town		
2000–2003	→ Hellenic FC (loan)		
2002–2006	Bloemfontein Celtic		

International career
1992–1993	South Africa	5	(1)
- * Club domestic league appearances and goals

Bennett Masinga (13 January 1965 – 14 November 2013) was a South African soccer player who played as a forward.

He was the cousin of former footballer Phil Masinga.

Masinga died on 14 November 2013 at the age of 48.

== International career ==
Masinga was on the score sheet with his cousin in one of Bafana Bafana's first international matches in a 2–2 draw against Cameroon on 11 July 1992. His fifth and last international match was against Mauritius on 10 April 1993.

== Style of play ==
MTN described Masinga as one of the best near post goalscorers in SA football, a tiny man, quick as lightning and able to sniff out a goal in any situation.

== Death ==
Masinga died at the age of 48 after a short illness. Condolences flooded in for the Masinga family. Former Mamelodi Sundowns teammate Zane Moosa took to Twitter to mourn with his tweet reading "Eish, what a sad way to start the weekend. The passing of Bennett "Loverboy" Masinga, what a player! Robala ka kgostso Bennito". Phil Masinga also said "I idolised him. Followed him around as a youngster. Carried his boots for him just to see him play. All I wanted was to be as good in football as he was. No doubt he was a better player than me."

== Career statistics ==
#	Date	Venue	Opponent	Score	Result	Competition
1	11 July 1992	FNB Stadium, South Africa	Cameroon	2-2	2-2	International friendly

== See also ==
- List of African association football families
