= Lucas Radebe =

South African soccer player (born 1969)

Lucas Radebe OIS
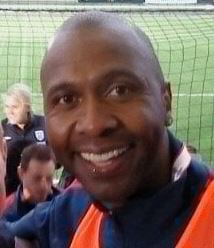
- Radebe in 2011

Personal information
- Full name: Lucas Valeriu Radebe
- Date of birth: 12 April 1969 (age 57)
- Place of birth: Soweto, South Africa
- Height: 1.80 m (5 ft 11 in)
- Position: Centre-back

Youth career
- Diepkloof Wolf Wanderers
- 1987–1988: ICL Birds
- 1989: Kaizer Chiefs Juniors

Senior career*
Years	Team	Apps	(Gls)
1989–1994	Kaizer Chiefs	113+	(5+)
1994–2005	Leeds United	201	(0)
Total		314+	(5+)

International career
1992–2003	South Africa	70	(2)
Medal record
Representing South Africa
Men's football
Africa Cup of Nations
Winner	1996
Runner-up	1998
Third place	2000
- * Club domestic league appearances and goals

Lucas Valeriu Radebe (born 12 April 1969) is a South African former professional footballer who played as a centre-back.

He began playing in the than known Bophuthatswana Soccer league (BOPSOL) playing for Stocks Birds in Lehurutshe closer to Zeerust(North West Provence) before being scouted by Kaizer Chiefs in South Africa, before transferring to Leeds United, where he played 262 matches for the Yorkshire side. During his spells at these clubs, he picked up the nicknames "Rhoo" and "The Chief". He became captain of Leeds United and also of the South African national team, most notably at 2002 FIFA World Cup. Nelson Mandela said of Radebe: "This is my hero." He also captained Kaizer Chiefs during his time at Chiefs. Radebe was the captain of the South African national football team during both the 1998 FIFA World Cup and the 2002 FIFA World Cup. South Africa failed to reach the knockout stages on both occasions; however Radebe did get on the score sheet in 2002. He earned 70 caps for South Africa and scored two goals during his international career, with his last match being against England on 22 May 2003.

After retiring, Radebe was influential in South Africa's successful bid to host the 2010 World Cup. He could also be seen working as a pundit for South African television, and during ITV's coverage of the tournament.

== Early life ==
Radebe was born to Emily and Johannes Radebe in the Diepkloof section of Soweto, near Johannesburg, as one of 11 children. He attended the local Bopasenatla Secondary School until he was 15 years old. His parents sent him to one of the former homelands in Grade 10, Bophuthatswana, as a way to keep him safe from the violent neighbourhood of Diepkloof Zone Four in Soweto. There he attended Ngotwane High School near Zeerust.

== Club career ==
=== Kaizer Chiefs ===
After playing for amateur side ICL Birds in the now-defunct Bophuthatswana Soccer League, and was spotted by Patrick Ntsoelengoe who recruited him to one of South Africa's top clubs, the Kaizer Chiefs, in 1989. Radebe originally started his career with the Kaizer Chiefs as a goalkeeper, and then switched positions to central midfield and then finally to central defence.

He played 155 matches for the club between 1989 and 1994.

=== Leeds United ===
In 1994, Radebe and another South African player, Philemon "Chippa" Masinga, moved to Leeds United for a transfer fee of £250,000. Radebe was only included in the deal to keep Masinga happy; as it turned out, he became the more valuable investment.

Initially the move was not a success; Radebe did not agree with then Leeds manager Howard Wilkinson, and suffered injuries which prevented him for earning a regular first team place.

Radebe returned to the goalkeeper position in March 1996, replacing John Lukic in the position after he suffered an injury in the second half of a defeat to Middlesbrough. Radebe would again play in the goalkeeper position the following month when goalkeeper Mark Beeney was sent off for handling the ball outside his area in the 17th minute against Manchester United. Radebe was brought on as a substitute in place of Mark Ford, and despite Leeds losing 1–0, Radebe earned 'cult-hero' status at the club due to his performance.

However, when Wilkinson was replaced by George Graham, his career flourished and Radebe was made captain of the team for the 1998–99 season. Whilst he was captain, Leeds enjoyed a period of relative success; in the 1998–99 season, they finished fourth in the FA Premier League, qualifying for the UEFA Cup. During the 1999–2000 season, Leeds finished third in the Premier League and qualified for the following season's Champions League, where they eventually reached the semi-finals. During this time, Radebe turned down the chance to move to Manchester United, AC Milan and Roma. Alex Ferguson commented at the time, "Everyone should be interested in Lucas."

In 2000, he was awarded the FIFA Fair Play Award.

However, in 2000 Radebe sustained serious knee and ankle injuries, which kept him out of the game for almost two years, and subsequently found it difficult to regain his form and his place in the team.

Radebe's last game for Leeds United was in August 2004 against Wolverhampton Wanderers, where he was stretchered off with a ruptured achilles tendon. A testimonial match was held for Radebe in April 2005.

== International career ==
Following South Africa's readmission to international football in 1992, Radebe was selected for the national team for the country's first official international match against Cameroon. He was 23 years and 86 days old at the time, making him the second-youngest South African to play for the national team, behind Phil Masinga, who also made his debut in the same fixture. He played the full 90 minutes as South Africa, fielding a side made up entirely of debutants, defeated their more established opponents 1–0. He quickly established himself in the side, forming a strong central defensive partnership with Neil Tovey. Although Tovey generally played as the last defender, Radebe was more adventurous in possession and frequently advanced to support attacks. His ability to operate in midfield further demonstrated his versatility and made him an increasingly influential member of the national side.

His first major international tournament came at the 1996 African Cup of Nations, hosted by South Africa, after the country had failed to qualify for the preceding edition and the 1994 FIFA World Cup. His selection was initially uncertain because of a long-term knee injury sustained in 1995, but he was ultimately included in the 20-man squad. Although he retained his place in the squad, he missed South Africa's opening group-stage victory over Cameroon. He made his tournament debut as a substitute in the subsequent match against Angola before returning to the starting line-up for the final group fixture against Egypt and the quarter-final against Algeria. Radebe retained his place for the semi-final against Ghana, helping South Africa secure a 3–0 victory and providing an assist for one of the goals. His performances earned him a starting position in the final against Tunisia, where he played the full 90 minutes as Bafana Bafana secured a 2–0 victory to win their first major continental title.

He remained an integral part of the national defence during the qualifying campaign for the 1998 FIFA World Cup, which resulted in South Africa's first qualification for the competition. Radebe's leadership qualities were recognised in April 1997 when he was appointed captain, subsequently leading the team through its remaining qualifiers. Shortly afterwards, he was selected for the 1997 FIFA Confederations Cup. He missed the first two group matches before returning for the third against Uruguay, in which he scored his first international goal in a 4–3 defeat.

His second Africa Cup of Nations appearance came in Burkina Faso in 1998, where he captained South Africa throughout the competition. He was one of only two South African players, alongside Willem Jackson, to feature in every minute. The team began with two draws but secured qualification for the knockout stage with a 4–1 victory in their final group match. Radebe then captained the team past Morocco in the quarter-finals and DR Congo in the semi-finals, although his booking against the latter initially raised concerns over his availability for the final. CAF later clarified that he had received only one yellow card in the competition, allowing him to play against Egypt, where South Africa lost 2–0.

Later that year, Radebe was included in South Africa's squad for the 1998 FIFA World Cup, the country's first appearance at the tournament. He started all three group matches against France, Denmark and Saudi Arabia, as South Africa were eliminated without recording a victory.

The following year, Radebe continued to combine his international responsibilities with his leadership at Leeds United, whom he captained to fourth place in the Premier League, the club's highest league finish since winning the title in 1992. He also represented an Africa XI against a Rest of the World team in a farewell match for Nelson Mandela and became the third South African player to reach 50 international caps.

At the 2000 African Cup of Nations, he once again captained the national side, leading it to the top of Group B. In the opening match against Gabon, he recorded his 30th appearance as captain, surpassing Neil Tovey's previous record. He then equalled John Moshoeu's record of 14 Africa Cup of Nations appearances for South Africa when he started in a 1–1 draw against Algeria in the final group match, a fixture for which Moshoeu was rested. Radebe then became the first South African to register 15 consecutive appearances at the tournament after the quarter-final victory over Ghana. South Africa were eliminated by Nigeria in the semi-finals but defeated Tunisia in a penalty shoot-out to claim third place. He concluded the tournament with 17 appearances, equalling Moshoeu's overall national record at the time.

Following the tournament, Radebe remained an important member of the South African defence but was increasingly troubled by injuries. An ankle injury sidelined him for much of the 2000–01 season, and he subsequently missed almost 13 months of football in total. He did not feature in a single Premier League match during the following season, effectively ruling him out of South Africa's squad for the 2002 African Cup of Nations. By the time he regained his fitness, Jomo Sono had been reappointed as national team coach. Radebe was initially omitted from South Africa's provisional squad for the 2002 FIFA World Cup but earned a late recall after impressing in a warm-up friendly against Madagascar, securing the final place in the 23-man squad.

Despite initial concerns about his match fitness, Radebe became an important figure in Sono's side and featured in all three of South Africa's matches at the tournament. On 23 May 2002, shortly before the World Cup, he earned his 66th international cap in a 2–0 friendly victory over Turkey, equalling the national appearance record jointly held by Helman Mkhalele and John Moshoeu. His 67th appearance came in South Africa's opening World Cup match against Paraguay on 2 June, a 2–2 draw, making him the country's most-capped player outright. At 33 years and 51 days old, he also became South Africa's oldest outfield player to start a World Cup match, behind only goalkeeper Andre Arendse in the overall age record. He subsequently captained the team to its first World Cup victory, a 1–0 win over Slovenia in the second group match. In the final fixture against Spain, with South Africa needing a draw to progress to the knockout stage, Radebe scored the equaliser that would've seen South Africa through to the round of 16. However, Raúl put Spain back in front three minutes later, ending South Africa's hopes of progressing and allowing Paraguay to advance instead. The goal was his first for the national team in five years, a gap later surpassed only by Steven Pienaar, and made him South Africa's oldest goalscorer at the World Cup. The match against Spain was his 69th international appearance and his 24th in major international tournaments, taking him past teammate Moshoeu as the country's most experienced player in international tournaments at the time. His six World Cup appearances also represented a national record.

Following the tournament, recurring injuries and his club commitments at Leeds United increasingly limited Radebe's international involvement. Mbulelo Mabizela consequently featured in his absence, although Radebe maintained that he had no intention of retiring and hoped to continue representing South Africa until the end of the 2002–03 season. He eventually brought his international career to a close in May 2003, after making his final appearance against England. The friendly was organised to promote South Africa's bid for the 2010 FIFA World Cup and provided the defender with a farewell occasion, despite disagreements with coach Ephraim Mashaba. He continued supporting South Africa's hosting bid following his retirement, with the country awarded the tournament in May 2004. His appearance record was surpassed by John Moshoeu in 2004, while Aaron Mokoena broke his captaincy record in 2009.

== Style of play ==
Thebe Mabanga, a Mail & Guardian journalist, wrote that South African fans remember Radebe in his Kaizer Chiefs days as "a lanky, flamboyant central midfielder who switched to central defence with ease, snuffing out any opposition threat with exquisite, acrobatic scissor kicks and diving headers, and man-marking the most lethal strikers into silence".

== Post-playing career ==
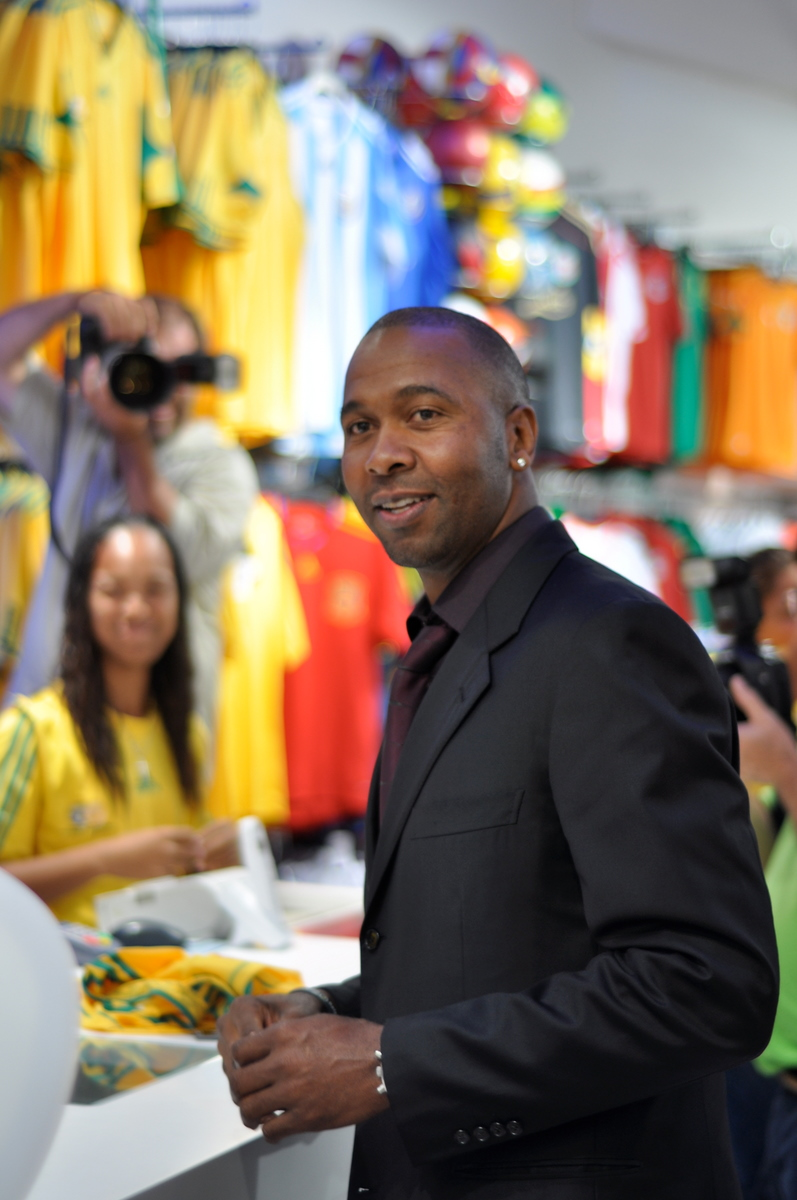
Radebe in 2009

At the end of the 2005 season, Radebe retired from professional football. Leeds held a testimonial for Radebe at Elland Road on 2 May 2005 attended by a crowd of over 37,886. Radebe also held a retirement match in Durban, South Africa between a South African Invitation XI and Lucas Radebe All Stars at Kings Park Soccer Stadium. The proceeds from both of these matches were combined with other money raised and donated to charity.

On 28 August 2006, Radebe announced that he was going back to Leeds after failing to secure a job with the World Cup hosts to be involved in the set-up of Bafana Bafana. He said he was "tired of waiting for unreliable people" who had allegedly promised him a role in the national team set up as the South African Football Association prepared to host the next World Cup in 2010.

In 2008, a local Leeds brewery asked for suggestions for a new beer; the most popular suggestion was Radebeer, showing the Leeds fans' admiration of Radebe.

On 8 October 2009, The English Football Association announced Radebe as an ambassador to help boost the 2018 World Cup bid.

A biography, Lucas: From the Streets of Soweto to Soccer Superstar by Richard Coomber was published in 2010.

In May 2010 he won the PFA Merit Award for his contribution to football.

During the 2010 FIFA World Cup, Radebe was a pundit for ITV's match coverage and also a columnist for The Daily Telegraph.

Radebe revealed in September 2010 that he would like to manage Leeds United in the future and also manage the South African national side. He said both jobs were the only coaching jobs that he would consider. In July 2012, it was announced that Radebe had accepted a position as team manager with the South African national side.

In October 2013, Radebe announced that he was set for another emotional return to the Elland Road ground at Leeds, to be presented to the crowd on Sunday, 30 October 2013.

On 23 January, it was confirmed that Boxer Josh Warrington would fight IBF world champion Lee Selby (26–1) in his first world title fight on 19 May at Elland Road with Radebe joining Warrington for the ringwalk. On 19 May, Warrington secured a split-decision victory over Selby to claim the title. With Radebe as part of Warrington's ringwalk and band Kaiser Chiefs also played songs at the event.

== Personal life ==
In 1991, he was shot whilst driving with his brother Lazarus to buy drinks for his mother but was not critically wounded. When Leeds United confirmed their interest in 1994, Radebe's decision influenced in part by an incident that had taken place three years previously. Radebe was shopping for his mother, accompanied by his brothers, one of his sisters and her baby. While walking, they heard a gunshot, but didn't pay it much attention because, says Radebe: "In Soweto you heard shots all the time". He felt a pain in his back and he was bleeding, and his left leg went limp. Radebe was rushed to hospital but nothing vital had been damaged. The bullet had entered his back and exited halfway down his thigh. The culprit is still unknown, it is suspected that someone was hired to shoot him rather than allow him to switch clubs.

He was voted 54th in the Top 100 Great South Africans in 2004.

His wife Feziwe died of cancer in October 2008. In December 2008, Radebe was treated for a heart complaint after collapsing while at the gym. Radebe married his second wife at the end of 2015.

== Legacy ==
Kaiser Chiefs, a British indie rock band, whose members are all Leeds United supporters, chose this name because Radebe is a former player of Kaizer Chiefs.

Radebe has been an ambassador of FIFA for SOS Children's Villages; he also received the FIFA Fair Play Award in December 2000 for his contribution in ridding soccer of racism as well as for his work with children in South Africa.

In April 2003, for recognition of his efforts both on an off the field, Radebe was given the Contribution to the Community Award in the Premier League 10 Seasons Awards.

On an official visit to Leeds, Nelson Mandela said of Radebe: "This is my hero."

== Career statistics ==
=== Club ===
Appearances and goals by club, season and competition
Club	Season	League			FA Cup		League Cup		Continental^{2}		Total	
Club	Season	Division	Apps	Goals	Apps	Goals	Apps	Goals	Apps	Goals	Apps	Goals
Kaizer Chiefs^{1}	1989	National Soccer League (South Africa)	33	2								
Kaizer Chiefs^{1}	1990	National Soccer League (South Africa)	42	1								
Kaizer Chiefs^{1}	1991	National Soccer League (South Africa)	38	2								
Kaizer Chiefs^{1}	1992	National Soccer League (South Africa)										
Kaizer Chiefs^{1}	1993	National Soccer League (South Africa)										
Kaizer Chiefs^{1}	1994	National Soccer League (South Africa)										
Kaizer Chiefs^{1}	Total		113	5							155	
Leeds United	1994–95	Premier League	12	0	1	0	1	0	0	0	14	0
Leeds United	1995–96	Premier League	13	0	0	0	1	0	0	0	14	0
Leeds United	1996–97	Premier League	32	0	3	0	1	0	0	0	36	0
Leeds United	1997–98	Premier League	27	0	2	1	4	0	0	0	33	1
Leeds United	1998–99	Premier League	29	0	3	0	1	0	3	0	36	0
Leeds United	1999–2000	Premier League	31	0	2	0	2	0	11	2	46	2
Leeds United	2000–01	Premier League	21	0	1	0	1	0	10	0	33	0
Leeds United	2001–02	Premier League	0	0	0	0	0	0	0	0	0	0
Leeds United	2002–03	Premier League	19	0	4	0	0	0	3	0	26	0
Leeds United	2003–04	Premier League	14	0	0	0	1	0	0	0	15	0
Leeds United	2004–05	Championship	3	0	0	0	0	0	0	0	3	0
Leeds United	Total		314	5	16	1	12	0	27	2	256	3
Career total			314	5	16	1	12	0	27	2	411	8

1. More detailed statistics for Kaizer Chiefs games for this period are not available.
2. "Continental" includes UEFA Cup and Champions League appearances.

=== International ===
Appearances and goals by national team and year
National team	Year	Apps	Goals
South Africa	1992	5	0
South Africa	1993	5	0
South Africa	1994	5	0
South Africa	1996	9	0
South Africa	1997	11	1
South Africa	1998	13	0
South Africa	1999	7	0
South Africa	2000	7	0
South Africa	2001	1	0
South Africa	2002	6	1
South Africa	2003	1	0
Total		70	2

Scores and results list South Africa's goal tally first.

List of international goals scored by Lucas Radebe
No.	Date	Venue	Opponent	Score	Result	Competition
1	17 December 1997	King Fahd II Stadium, Riyadh, Saudi Arabia	Uruguay	1–0	3–4	1997 FIFA Confederations Cup
2	12 June 2002	Daejeon World Cup Stadium, Daejeon, South Korea	Spain	2–2	2–3	2002 FIFA World Cup

== Honours ==
Kaizer Chiefs

- National Soccer League: 1989, 1991, 1992

Leeds United

- Football League Cup runner-up: 1995–96

South Africa

- African Cup of Nations: 1996
