= Líber Vespa =

Uruguayan footballer (1971-2018)

Personal information
- Full name: Líber Ernesto Vespa Legarralde
- Date of birth: 18 October 1971
- Place of birth: Montevideo, Uruguay
- Date of death: 25 July 2018 (aged 46)
- Height: 1.72 m (5 ft 8 in)
- Position: Midfielder

Senior career*
Years	Team	Apps	(Gls)
1991–1994	Cerro		
1994–1998	Argentinos Juniors	88	(17)
1998–2002	Rosario Central	75	(8)
2002–2003	Arsenal de Sarandí	20	(0)
2003–2004	Huracán	20	(1)
2004	Cerro	12	(1)
2005–2006	Montevideo Wanderers	26	(0)

International career
1997–1999	Uruguay	12	(0)
- * Club domestic league appearances and goals

Líber Ernesto Vespa Legarralde (18 October 1971 – 25 July 2018) was a Uruguayan footballer who played for a number of clubs both in Argentina and Uruguay, including Argentinos Juniors, Rosario Central and C.A. Cerro.

He died on 25 July 2018 in Montevideo aged 46 after suffering an aneurysm.

== Honours ==
Uruguay

- Copa América runner-up: 1999
