= Hassan Mubarak =

Emirati footballer (born 1968)

Hassan Mubarak (born 13 April 1968) is a footballer from the United Arab Emirates.

He scored a goal in the 1997 FIFA Confederations Cup.

== Career statistics ==
=== International ===
Appearances and goals by national team and year
National team	Year	Apps	Goals
United Arab Emirates	1996	11	0
United Arab Emirates	1997	16	2
United Arab Emirates	1998	9	1
United Arab Emirates	1999	3	0
Total		39	3

Scores and results list United Arab Emirates' goal tally first, score column indicates score after each Mubarak goal.

List of international goals scored by Hassan Mubarak
No.	Date	Venue	Opponent	Score	Result	Competition	Ref.
1	26 October 1997	National Stadium, Tokyo, Japan	Japan	1–1	1–1	1998 FIFA World Cup qualification	
2	15 December 1997	King Fahd International Stadium, Riyadh, Saudi Arabia	South Africa	1–0	1–0	1997 FIFA Confederations Cup	
3	12 November 1988	Bahrain National Stadium, Riffa, Bahrain	Kuwait	1–2	1–4	14th Arabian Gulf Cup	
