= Petr Vlček =

Czech footballer (born 1973)

Personal information
- Date of birth: 18 October 1973 (age 53)
- Place of birth: Mariánské Lázně, Czechoslovakia
- Height: 1.90 m (6 ft 3 in)
- Position: Defender

Youth career
- 1979–1987: Lokomotiva Mariánské Lázně
- 1987–1992: Škoda Plzeň

Senior career*
Years	Team	Apps	(Gls)
1992	Sokol Svéradice		
1993	VTJ Karlovy Vary		
1993–1997	Viktoria Plzeň	85	(8)
1997–2000	Slavia Prague	80	(6)
2000–2001	Standard Liège	11	(0)
2001–2005	Panionios	81	(9)
2005	Ethnikos Achna	13	(0)
2006	Viktoria Plzeň	10	(0)
2006–2007	Niki Volos	7	(0)
2007–2008	1. FC Bad Kötzting	45	(1)

International career
1995–1996	Czech Republic U-21	5	(0)
1997–2002	Czech Republic	18	(0)
- * Club domestic league appearances and goals

Petr Vlček (born 18 October 1973) is a Czech former professional footballer who played as a defender. At club level, he played within his country for Viktoria Plzeň and Slavia Prague, as well as abroad in Belgium, Greece and Cyprus. Internationally he represented the Czech Republic, making a total of 18 appearances for his nation between 1997 and 2002. He was part of the Czech squad at the 2000 UEFA European Championship. He also represented his country at the 1997 FIFA Confederations Cup.

== Club career ==
Vlček was born in Mariánské Lázně. A defender, he played youth football for Lokomotiva Mariánské Lázně and Škoda Plzeň. He then played for Sokol Svéradice and VTJ Karlovy Vary until returning to his former team Škoda Plzeň, then FC Viktoria Plzeň, where he played for four more seasons. During the 1996–97 season, Vlček transferred to Slavia Prague, where he would spend a further four seasons. He left his country in 2000 to play for a year in Belgium for Standard Liège and one year later he signed for Panionios for four years. For the 2005–06 season he went to Cyprus to play for Ethnikos Achna. In January 2006, Vlček signed an 18-month contract with former club Plzeň, with manager Zdeněk Michálek choosing to use him as a defensive midfielder.

He returned to Greece to play for Niki Volos in the 2006–07 season, before finishing his professional career. In 2007, he was transferred to the German fourth-level-club 1. FC Bad Kötzting.

== International career ==
Vlček represented his country at under-21 level before making his debut in 1997 for the senior side. He was part of the Czech squad at the 2000 UEFA European Championship, but did not play in the tournament.

== Personal life ==
Vlček went to school in Plzeň. He has two sons, Matyáš and Dominik, with his second wife, Lucie.
