= Zdeněk Svoboda =

Czech footballer (born 1972)

Personal information
- Date of birth: 20 May 1972 (age 54)
- Place of birth: Brno, Czechoslovakia
- Height: 1.81 m (5 ft 11 in)
- Position: Midfielder

Senior career*
Years	Team	Apps	(Gls)
1989–1990	1. FC Brno	15	(2)
1991–1992	Dukla Prague	23	(2)
1992–1993	1. FC Brno	15	(1)
1993–2002	Sparta Prague	168	(20)
2002–2005	K.V.C. Westerlo	22	(1)
2005–2006	BV Cloppenburg	13	(1)
2006–2007	Sliema Wanderers	12	(2)

International career
1996–1997	Czech Republic	9	(0)

Managerial career
- 2009–2012: Sparta Prague B
- 2012–2017: AC Sparta Prague (assistant)
- 2014–2016: Czech Republic (assistant)
Medal record
AC Sparta Prague
Winner	Gambrinus liga	1993–94
Winner	Gambrinus liga	1994–95
- * Club domestic league appearances and goals

Zdeněk Svoboda (born 20 May 1972) is a former professional footballer who played as a midfielder mostly for Sparta Prague in Czech First League.

Svoboda was born in Brno, Czechoslovakia. He notably played for Sparta Prague, spending nine seasons and played over 150 matches. Svoboda played nine matches with the Czech Republic national team. In July 2009, Svoboda took up his first coaching role as head coach for the Sparta Prague reserve team.
