= Pablo Hernández (footballer, born 1975) =

Uruguayan footballer

Personal information
- Full name: Pablo Fernando Hernández Roetti
- Date of birth: 2 May 1975 (age 51)
- Place of birth: Montevideo, Uruguay
- Height: 1.79 m (5 ft 10 in)
- Position: Defender

Senior career*
Years	Team	Apps	(Gls)
1992–1997	Defensor Sporting		
1998–1999	Tigres UANL	46	(2)
1999–2000	CF Pachuca	21	(1)
2000–2001	Defensor Sporting	22	(1)
2001	Puebla FC		
2002–2003	Grêmio FBPA	13	(1)
2003	SSC Venezia		
2004	CA Bella Vista	14	(1)

International career
1996–1997	Uruguay	7	(0)
- * Club domestic league appearances and goals

Pablo Fernando Hernández Roetti (born 5 May 1975 in Montevideo) is a retired Uruguayan association footballer.

He was signed for Venezia on 22 July 2003.

== Honours ==
- Mexican champions: Invierno 1999
