= Gonzalo de los Santos =

Uruguayan footballer (born 1976)

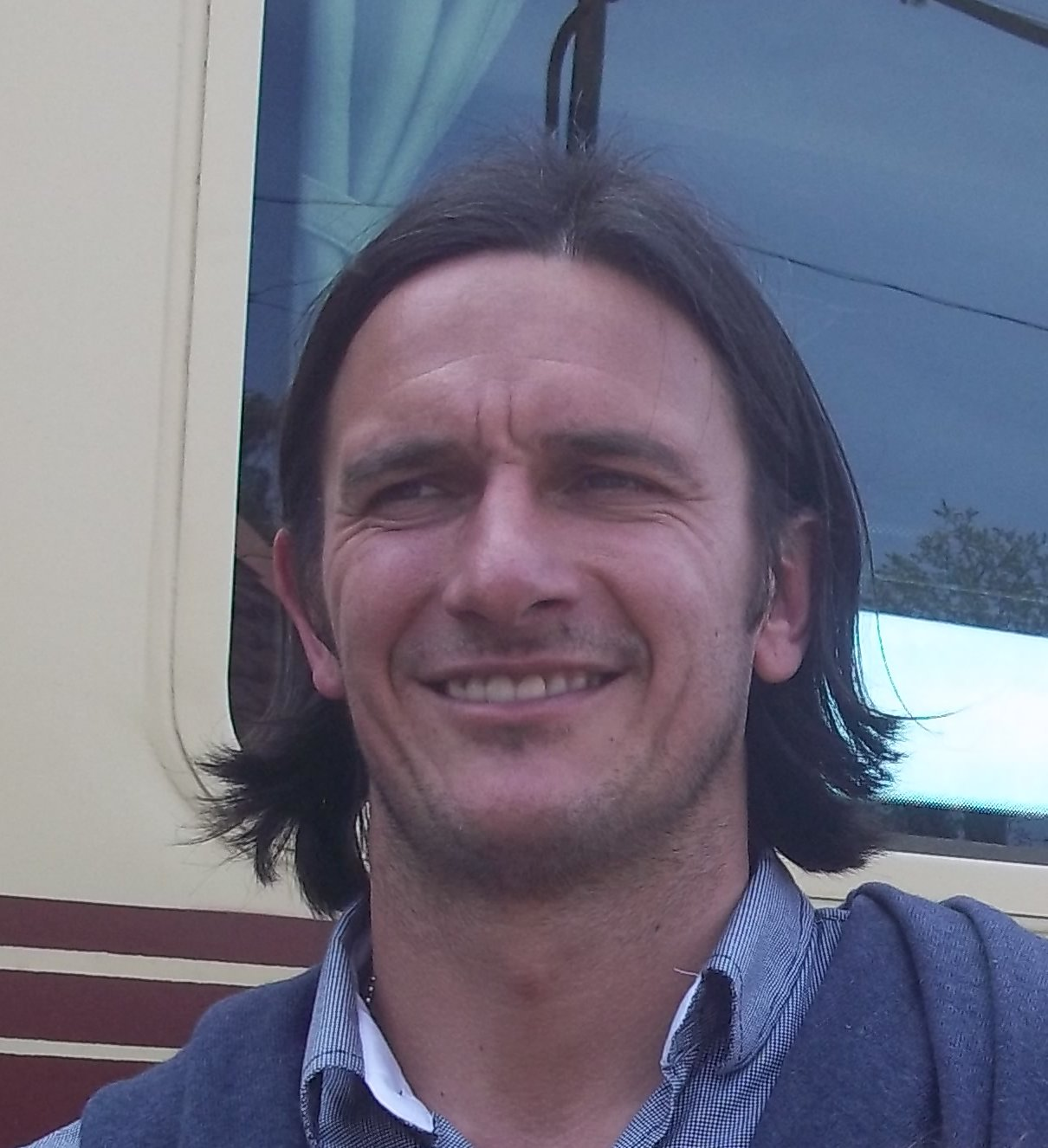
- De los Santos in 2011

Personal information
- Full name: Gonzalo de los Santos da Rosa
- Date of birth: 19 July 1976 (age 50)
- Place of birth: Salto, Uruguay
- Height: 1.89 m (6 ft 2 1/2 in)
- Position: Defensive midfielder

Senior career*
Years	Team	Apps	(Gls)
1995–1997	Peñarol	62	(5)
1997–1998	Mérida	31	(2)
1998–2001	Málaga	86	(6)
2001–2006	Valencia	31	(2)
2003–2004	→ Atlético Madrid (loan)	32	(3)
2005	→ Mallorca (loan)	16	(0)
2006–2008	Hércules	46	(1)
2008–2010	Peñarol	25	(0)
Total		329	(19)

International career
1996–2005	Uruguay	33	(1)

Managerial career
- 2013–2014: Miramar Misiones
- * Club domestic league appearances and goals

Gonzalo de los Santos da Rosa (born 19 July 1976) is a Uruguayan retired footballer who played as a defensive midfielder, and is a manager.

He spent the vast majority of his professional career in Spain, playing 280 competitive matches for six teams over 11 seasons – 179 in La Liga alone, being crowned champion with Valencia – but started and finished it at the same club, Peñarol.

De los Santos won 33 caps for Uruguay, and represented the nation at the 2002 World Cup.

== Club career ==
De los Santos was born in Salto. After winning three consecutive Primera División titles with Peñarol he moved to Spain, where he represented CP Mérida, Málaga CF (achieving La Liga promotion in 1999), Valencia CF – appearing in 13 matches for the 2002 league champions – Atlético Madrid and RCD Mallorca; at the latter club, he reunited with former Valencia teammate Jorge López, who had also been loaned shortly before.

For the 2006–07 campaign, after having spent one year on the sidelines, de los Santos joined Segunda División side Hércules CF. After two seasons where he was relatively unused, he returned to Peñarol on 29 July 2008, retiring from football two years later at the age of 34.

== International career ==
An Uruguayan international for nine years, de los Santos was selected for the squad that appeared in the 2002 FIFA World Cup, featuring 20 minutes in the 0–0 group stage draw against France. He also represented the nation at the 1997 FIFA Confederations Cup in Saudi Arabia, playing four games in an eventual fourth-place finish.
