= Edgardo Adinolfi =

Uruguayan footballer (born 1974)

Personal information
- Full name: Edgardo Alberto Adinolfi Duarte
- Date of birth: 27 March 1974 (age 52)
- Place of birth: Montevideo, Uruguay
- Height: 1.77 m (5 ft 10 in)
- Position: Left back

Senior career*
Years	Team	Apps	(Gls)
1992–1995	River Plate	70	(2)
1995–1996	Maccabi Haifa	22	(1)
1996–1999	Peñarol	36	(2)
1999–2001	Gimnasia de la Plata	33	(1)
2001	Defensor Sporting	16	(1)
2001–2002	PAOK	0	(0)
2001–2002	Fenix	5	(0)
2002	Newell's Old Boys	42	(3)
2004–2005	Pontevedra CF	11	(0)
2005–2006	Newell's Old Boys	10	(0)
2006	Tiro Federal	5	(0)
2006–2007	Olympiakos Nicosia	8	(0)

International career
1994–1997	Uruguay	18	(1)

Managerial career
- 2008: Gimnasia LP (assistant)
- 2009: Cerro (assistant)
- 2010: Peñarol (youth)
- 2010–2013: River Plate Montevideo (youth)
- 2013: Peñarol (assistant)
- 2013–2015: Alianza Lima (assistant)
- 2016: River Ecuador (assistant)
- 2017–2018: Delfín (assistant)
- 2018–2019: Santa Fe (assistant)
- 2020: Universitario (assistant)
- 2020–2021: Defensor Sporting (assistant)
- 2021: Alianza Atlético (assistant)
- 2021: Carlos Stein (assistant)
- 2021–2022: Universitario (assistant)
- 2022: Cerro
- 2022–2023: Barcelona SC (assistant)
- 2024-2025: Universitario (assistant)
- 2026-: Millonarios (assistant)
Medal record
Representing Uruguay
Copa América
Winner	1995 Uruguay
- * Club domestic league appearances and goals

Edgardo Alberto Adinolfi Duarte (Spanish pronunciation: [eðˈɣaɾðo aðiˈnolfi]; born 27 March 1974) is a Uruguayan football coach and former player. He is the current assistant manager of Peruvian club Universitario de Deportes.

A left back, Adinolfi has played club football in Uruguay, Israel, Argentina, Cyprus and Spain.

== International career ==
Adinolfi won the 1995 Copa América with the Uruguay national team, scoring in the semi-final against Colombia. He played a total of 18 games for Uruguay between 1994 and 1997. He made his debut for Uruguay on 19 October 1994 in a friendly match against Peru (0–1 win) at the Estadio Nacional José Díaz in Lima, Peru.
