= Claudio Flores =

Uruguayan footballer (born 1976)

Personal information
- Full name: Claudio Sebastián Flores Banegas
- Date of birth: May 10, 1976 (age 50)
- Place of birth: Colonia, Uruguay
- Height: 1.85 m (6 ft 1 in)
- Position: Goalkeeper

Senior career*
Years	Team	Apps	(Gls)
1995–2000	Peñarol	95	(0)
2000–2004	Lanús	122	(0)
2005	Libertad	9	(0)
2005–2006	Peñarol	27	(0)
2006–2008	Lanús	1	(0)
2008–2009	Bella Vista	22	(0)
2010	Rentistas		
2010–2011	Sportivo Italiano	3	(0)
2011–2012	Sarmiento		
2012–2014	Platense		
2015	Cerrito		
2016	Cañuelas		
2016–	Atlántida Juniors		

International career
1997	Uruguay	4	(0)
- * Club domestic league appearances and goals as of 12 August 2008

Claudio Sebastián Flores Banegas (born May 10, 1976) is a Uruguayan former football goalkeeper. He last played for Atlántida Juniors in the Eastern Canelones Regional League.

Flores started his professional career with Peñarol in 1995. During his time with the club he won four Uruguayan Premier division titles in 1995, 1996, 1997 and 1999.

In 2000, Flores joined Lanús in Argentina where he played until the end of 2004. He then had a short spell with Libertad in Paraguay before returning to Peñarol. In 2006, he returned to Lanús but has failed to re-establish himself as the number one goalkeeper. In 2007, he was a non-playing member of the squad that won the Apertura 2007 tournament, Lanús' first ever top flight league title.

== Honours ==
=== Club ===
- Peñarol
  - Primera División Uruguaya: 1995, 1996, 1997, 1999
- Lanús
  - Primera División Argentina: Apertura 2007
