= John Moeti =

South African soccer player (1967–2023)

Personal information
- Date of birth: 30 August 1967
- Place of birth: Soweto, South Africa
- Date of death: 6 February 2023 (aged 55)
- Height: 1.70 m (5 ft 7 in)
- Position: Midfielder

Senior career*
Years	Team	Apps	(Gls)
1995–1999	Orlando Pirates		
2000–2001	SuperSport United		

International career
1995–1999	South Africa	29	(1)
- * Club domestic league appearances and goals

John Moeti (30 August 1967 – 6 February 2023) was a South African former professional soccer player who played as a midfielder. He played club football for Orlando Pirates and SuperSport United; he also earned 29 caps for the South Africa national side between 1995 and 1999, scoring one goal. He won the CAF Champions League in 1995 when Pirates defeated ASEC Mimosas of Ivory Coast in the final. He was part of the squad that won the 1996 African Cup of Nations.
