= John Moshoeu =

South African soccer player (1965-2015)

Personal information
- Full name: John Lesiba Moshoeu
- Date of birth: 18 December 1965
- Place of birth: Soweto, South Africa
- Date of death: 21 April 2015 (aged 49)
- Place of death: Johannesburg, South Africa
- Height: 1.77 m (5 ft 9 1/2 in)
- Position: Attacking midfielder

Youth career
- Diepkloof Blue Whales
- Kaizer Chiefs

Senior career*
Years	Team	Apps	(Gls)
1987–1992	Giant Blackpool	175	(75)
1993	Kaizer Chiefs	14	(2)
1993–1995	Gençlerbirligi	27	(5)
1995–1997	Kocaelispor	76	(20)
1997–2001	Fenerbahçe	75	(15)
2001–2003	Bursaspor	48	(7)
2003–2006	Kaizer Chiefs	89	(23)
2006–2008	AmaZulu	51	(5)
Total		555	(152)

International career
1993–2004	South Africa	73	(8)

Managerial career
- 2010–2014: Alexandra United
- * Club domestic league appearances and goals

John Lesiba Moshoeu (18 December 1965 – 21 April 2015) was a South African football midfielder who most notably played for Kaizer Chiefs and the South African national team.

== Career ==
=== Giant Blackpool ===
Moshoeu was born in Ga Mashashane, Limpopo and grew up in Diepkloof, Soweto. He started his career with local amateur club Diepkloof Blue Whales and was later recruited to join Giant Blackpool playing in the OK League for R3,000. He made his professional debut from Giant Blackpool in a 2–1 loss to Arcadia Shepherds on 1 March 1987. He scored his first goal in a 4–3 loss to Wits University on 18 April 1987. Fani Madida and Geelboy Gomma Gomma Masango joined him later at Blackpool, making up the "Triple M" combination . He helped Blackpool reach the 1991 JPS Cup Final, where he ended up on the losing side against Dynamos at Ellis Park Stadium. At Blackpool, Moshoeu scored 75 goals in 175 matches.

=== Kaizer Chiefs ===
Moshoeu chose to move to Kaizer Chiefs over Orlando Pirates for a then record fee of R250,000 after the two teams were neck and neck for his services in 1993 after having gone for trials at Wolverhampton Wanderers. His stay was short-lived as he left in mid-season having only played 14 games. Before joining Chiefs, he had been sidelined for six months with a broken leg.

=== In Turkey ===
He later signed with FIFA agent Marcelo Houseman and transferred to Turkish club Genclerbirligi after the President Ilhan Cavcav flew to Johannesburg to see him play. He also played for Kocaelispor. He joined Fenerbahce for $2 million. where he was a favourite with the fans. In his time overseas, Moshoeu was coached by Franz Beckenbauer and Joachim Löw. He won a Turkish Cup in 1996/97 while at Kocaelispor.

=== Kaizer Chiefs (2nd spell) ===
He went back to Kaizer Chiefs at age 37 where, at his vintage age, he continued to excite his old fans with the same enthusiasm and skill in 2002. His time at the club saw him play 89 games and scoring 23 goals to his name. Moshoeu played a pivotal role for Chiefs in the 2003/04 season, Moshoeu finished as Chiefs top goalscorer with 11 goals in all competitions, including two hat-tricks. The first was against Black Leopards in a 5–0 win and the second against his future club, AmaZulu in a 4–1 win. Moshoeu assisted in ending Chiefs league title drought that had lasted 11 years. This wasn't his only title at the club. His trophy case acquired two Coca-Cola Cups (2003/04 and 2004/05), a second league title followed in the 2004/2005, and the Absa Cup in the 2005/06 season. He played at Chiefs until 2006.

=== AmaZulu ===
He played for AmaZulu until 2008 at the age of 42. He holds the record for the oldest goal scorer in the PSL when he scored for AmaZulu against Kaizer Chiefs in 2007 at the age of 41 years, 11 months and 17 days.

=== Later career ===
There were rumours that Moshoeu would make a comeback in March 2009 with Orlando Pirates or Bidvest Wits which he trained at but the deals never materialised. The attacking midfielder announced on 6 November 2010 his comeback with Brian Baloyi as owners of a South African club Alexandra United FC. In 2011/2012, Moshoeu scored 20 goals for Alex United in the Vodacom League. He called time on his career on 11 May 2014 when he resigned from the ABC Motsepe League club after following a fallout with the club's director, Nick Nicolaou. On 21 April 2015, he died of cancer.

When asked about retirement, after he turned 40, Moshoeu said, "I'm not a cheese. I don't get mouldy with age."

== International career ==
After recovering from a broken leg and being sidelined for six months, he made his debut for South Africa on 10 January 1993 and scored on debut against Botswana. With South Africa not qualifying for the 1994 African Cup of Nations and the 1994 FIFA World Cup, Moshoeu's tournament debut came at 1996 African Cup of Nations on home soil. He featured in every match of the tournament, scoring his first goal in the opening match against Cameroon in a 3–0 victory. South Africa topped their group before defeating Algeria 2–1 in the quarter-finals, with Moshoeu scoring the winning goal. He continued his impressive form in the semi-final against Ghana, scoring twice in a 3–0 victory to help South Africa reach the final against Tunisia. South Africa won the final 2–0, securing their first Africa Cup of Nations title. Moshoeu later said that he broke down in tears when asked for an autograph by a white fan after the game, only two years after South Africa's first racially open elections. He finished the tournament as joint second top scorer with teammate Mark Williams, with four goals in six appearances.

South Africa's triumph secured qualification for the 1997 FIFA Confederations Cup in Saudi Arabia, and Moshoeu was once again included in Clive Barker's squad. However, the tournament was not a success for Bafana Bafana, as they were eliminated in the group stage after competing against the Czech Republic, the United Arab Emirates and Uruguay. Moshoeu featured in all three of South Africa's matches as their campaign ended in an early exit.

Following the conclusion of the tournament, Moshoeu received another national team call-up for the 1998 African Cup of Nations. He was however, rested for the 1998 COSAFA Cup, as coach Jomo Sono sought to preserve him for the tournament in Burkina Faso. Moshoeu subsequently featured in all six of South Africa's matches at the Africa Cup of Nations, helping the team reach their second consecutive final, where he played the entire match in a 2–0 defeat to Egypt.

Following South Africa's qualification for the 1998 FIFA World Cup, Moshoeu was included in the squad, becoming the oldest South African player selected for the tournament. He featured in all three group-stage matches, earning his 50th international cap in the final fixture against Saudi Arabia and becoming the second South African player to reach the milestone after Neil Tovey. Moshoeu's most noticeable effort at the tournament came in the 1–1 group-stage draw against Denmark. He initiated the attacking move with a dribble that opened up the Danish defence before passing to Shaun Bartlett, whose touch set up Benni McCarthy to score South Africa's first-ever FIFA World Cup goal. South Africa finished the tournament with two points and were eliminated in the group stage. His record as the oldest South African player selected for a World Cup was surpassed four years later by Andre Arendse, aged 34, and Lucas Radebe, aged 33, at the 2002 tournament.

Moshoeu was 33 by the time South Africa qualified for the 2000 African Cup of Nations in Nigeria and Ghana. Although he had begun to lose some of the pace that had characterised his earlier performances, he was included in the squad and announced that he would retire from international football after the tournament. By the time South Africa faced Gabon in their opening match, Moshoeu had already become the country's most-capped player, having surpassed Neil Tovey's record of 52 appearances against Denmark the previous year, marking the occasion with his seventh international goal.

Moshoeu started in South Africa's opening two group victories against Gabon and the Democratic Republic of the Congo before being rested for their 1–1 draw with Algeria, ending his run of 14 successive Africa Cup of Nations matches. Lucas Radebe, who started all three group stage matches, subsequently equalled Moshoeu's record for the most Africa Cup of Nations appearances by a South African player. His appearance against Gabon also saw him break Neil Tovey's record as South Africa's oldest player at the Africa Cup of Nations, aged 34 years and 36 days. South Africa subsequently defeated Ghana 1–0 in the quarter-finals to reach the semi-finals for the third consecutive tournament. However, they were eliminated by Nigeria after suffering a 2–0 defeat, with Tijani Babangida scoring both goals. Moshoeu subsequently played in the third-place play-off against Tunisia, taking his Africa Cup of Nations appearances to 17, a joint national record alongside Radebe at the time. Following the tournament, Moshoeu reportedly became embroiled in a dispute with head coach Trott Moloto, whom he accused of tactical naivety and damaging the players' morale.

Following his fallout with Moloto, Moshoeu was overlooked by the national team for over a year before being recalled by subsequent head coach Carlos Queiroz for a friendly against Italy in April 2001. He ended his year-long absence from international football when he started in a 1–0 defeat to Italy on 25 April 2001, earning his 62nd cap, and retained his place for South Africa's 2–1 home victory over Zimbabwe in a 2002 FIFA World Cup qualifier the following month. In the penultimate qualifying match against Burkina Faso, Moshoeu became the oldest player to represent South Africa at the international level, aged 35 years and 195 days, surpassing Neil Tovey's previous record of 35 years and 166 days. The match ended in a 1–1 draw, a result that mathematically secured South Africa's qualification for a second consecutive FIFA World Cup. Later that year, Moshoeu made his 66th appearance against Egypt in what was believed to be his final international match at the time, equalling Helman Mkhalele's record for the most caps by a South African player, which Mkhalele had set a few months earlier. Moshoeu and Mkhalele shared the record until Lucas Radebe surpassed them during the 2002 FIFA World Cup.

Moshoeu subsequently fell out of contention again, missing South Africa's squad for the 2002 African Cup of Nations before becoming one of four veteran players omitted from the squad for the 2002 FIFA World Cup. His exclusion appeared to mark the end of his international career, but a strong season with Kaizer Chiefs brought him back into contention. On 9 October 2003, Moshoeu returned to the national team after a two-year absence, scoring his eighth international goal with a free kick and captaining South Africa in a 3–0 victory over Lesotho. It was his first international goal in more than four years, his previous one having come in April 1999. On 10 January 2004, exactly 11 years after his international debut, Moshoeu earned his 70th cap in a 2–0 defeat to Mauritius in the COSAFA Cup, drawing level with Lucas Radebe as South Africa's most-capped player. The appearance also gave him the longest international career span by a South African player at the time, stretching 11 years and surpassing Radebe's previous record, although Benni McCarthy later overtook him in 2008. Moshoeu subsequently became South Africa's outright record appearance holder when he started in a 2–1 defeat to Senegal on 18 January 2004, the team's final warm-up match before the 2004 African Cup of Nations. He was selected for the tournament, becoming one of the first South Africans to be named in four Africa Cup of Nations squads, alongside Andre Arendse. On 27 January 2004, he became the first South African to feature in four editions of the competition when he started against Benin in the opening group match. He also became the first South African to make 18 appearances in the tournament's final stages, surpassing the previous record of 17 that he had shared with Radebe. Moshoeu made one further appearance against Nigeria, taking his total to 19, which proved to be his final international appearance. It also marked his 25th appearance at a major international tournament, giving him the outright record ahead of Radebe. South Africa subsequently drew with Morocco in their final group match and were eliminated in the group stage. Although his international appearance record was later surpassed, Moshoeu remains the oldest player to have represented South Africa, having earned his final cap at the age of 38.

Moshoeu was known as "Shoes" by fans, who paid homage to him and Mark Fish by buying shoes and fish.

== Personal life ==
Moshoeu's family history is traced back to Alexandra township where his mother Reena Moshoeu resided. Moshoeu was a car enthusiast. Between 1985 and 2003, Moshoeu owned nine cars. His first was a Toyota Corolla 1.6 while during his time at Chiefs he owned a silver Porsche Boxster and a red Mini Cooper S. Moshoeu never got married and he is the father of four children, two boys, two girls.

=== Death ===
Moshoeu died on 21 April 2015 at the Morningside Hospital after a long battle with stomach cancer. Moshoeu was also admitted to the Charlotte Maxeke Hospital before his death.

Moshoeu's funeral service was held at the Grace Bible Church in Soweto and was buried at Westpark Cemetery in Randburg on 27 April 2015.

== Statistics ==
=== International goals ===
#	Date	Venue	Opponent	Score	Result	Competition
1	10 January 1993	National Stadium, Gaborone, Botswana	Botswana	2–0	2–0	International friendly
2	13 January 1996	FNB Stadium, Johannesburg, South Africa	Cameroon	3–0	3–0	1996 African Cup of Nations
3	27 January 1996	FNB Stadium, Johannesburg, South Africa	Algeria	2–1	2–1	1996 African Cup of Nations
4	31 January 1996	FNB Stadium, Johannesburg, South Africa	Ghana	1–0	3–0	1996 African Cup of Nations
5	31 January 1996	FNB Stadium, Johannesburg, South Africa	Ghana	3–1	3–1	1996 African Cup of Nations
6	18 September 1996	Athletics Stadium, Johannesburg, South Africa	Australia	1–0	2–0	Four Nations Cup
7	28 April 1999	Idrætsparken, Copenhagen, Denmark	Denmark	1–0	1–1	International friendly
8	8 October 2003	Setsoto Stadium, Maseru, Lesotho	Lesotho	3–0	3–0	International friendly
Correct as of 9 March 2017
