= Brendan Augustine =

South African soccer player (born 1971)

Personal information
- Date of birth: 26 October 1971 (age 55)
- Place of birth: East London, South Africa
- Height: 1.74 m (5 ft 9 in)
- Position: Right winger

Youth career
- Star of India
- Port Elizabeth Blackpool

Senior career*
Years	Team	Apps	(Gls)
1990–1996	Bush Bucks	132	(44)
1996–1999	LASK Linz	38	(1)
1999–2001	Ajax Cape Town	17	(3)

International career
1993–1998	South Africa	30	(4)
- * Club domestic league appearances and goals

Brendan Augustine (born 26 October 1971 in East London) is a South African former professional soccer player who played as a right winger for Bush Bucks, LASK Linz of Austria, and Ajax Cape Town.

He played for the South Africa national team and was a participant at the 1997 FIFA Confederations Cup, 1998 African Cup of Nations and 1998 FIFA World Cup. In the latter, Augustine was sent home, along with Naughty Mokoena for breaches of discipline after breaking curfew set by coach Philippe Troussier.

== Career statistics ==
Scores and results list South Africa's goal tally first, score column indicates score after each Augustine goal.

List of international goals scored by Brendan Augustine
No.	Date	Venue	Opponent	Score	Result	Competition
1	25 July 1993	Sir Anerood Jugnauth Stadium, Belle Vue Maurel, Mauritius	Mauritius		3–1	1994 African Cup of Nations qualification
2	10 May 1994	Ellis Park, Johannesburg, South Africa	Zambia		2–1	Friendly
3	30 September 1995	Soccer City, Johannesburg, South Africa	Mozambique		3–2	Friendly
4	13 December 1997	King Fahd II Stadium, Riyadh, Saudi Arabia	Czech Republic		2–2	1997 FIFA Confederations Cup
