= Willem Jackson =

South African soccer player

Personal information
- Full name: Willem Jackson
- Date of birth: 26 March 1972 (age 54)
- Place of birth: Bloemfontein, Free State, South Africa
- Height: 1.77 m (5 ft 9 1/2 in)
- Position: Defender

Senior career*
Years	Team	Apps	(Gls)
1990–1996	Bloemfontein Celtic	139	(21)
1996–2004	Orlando Pirates	104	(2)
2004–2007	Silver Stars	48	(2)
2007–2009	Platinum Stars	7	(1)
Total		298	(26)

International career
1997–2001	South Africa	17	(0)
- * Club domestic league appearances and goals

Willem Jackson (born 26 March 1972 in Bloemfontein, Free State) is a retired South African footballer who played as defender. A fullback capable of lining up on either flank, he played mostly for Bloemfontein Celtic and Orlando Pirates.

Jackson also played for South Africa, earning 18 caps, and was a part of the squad that travelled to France for the 1998 FIFA World Cup. During the tournament, he appeared in the first-round matches against France and Saudi Arabia, starting both matches at right back. Jackson made his international debut against France on 11 October 1997. His final international appearance came on 29 April 2001, a 3–0 victory over Mozambique in the COSAFA Castle Cup.
