= Pollen Ndlanya =

South African soccer player

Personal information
- Full name: Pollen Dumisani Ndlanya
- Date of birth: 22 May 1970 (age 56)
- Place of birth: Daveyton, Gauteng
- Height: 1.84 m (6 ft 1/2 in)
- Position: Striker

Youth career
- Daveyton Highlanders
- Daveyton Argentina
- Manchester City

Senior career*
| Years | Team | Apps | (Gls) |
| 1990–1991 | Kaizer Chiefs | 4 | (1) |
| 1991–1993 | Manning Rangers | 66 | (24) |
| 1994–1996 | Kaizer Chiefs | 54 | (27) |
| 1996–1998 | Göztepe | 26 | (5) |
| 1998–1999 | Bursaspor | 25 | (7) |
| 1999–2000 | Amazulu | 9 | (6) |
| 2000–2002 | Orlando Pirates | 48 | (23) |
| Total | | 232 | (93) |

International career
| 1996 | South Africa U-23 | 1 | (1) |
| 1997–2001 | South Africa | 29 | (5) |
- * Club domestic league appearances and goals

Pollen Ndlanya (born 22 May 1970 in Daveyton) is a retired South African footballer who played as a striker.

He played for Kaizer Chiefs, Manning Rangers, Bursaspor, Göztepe, Amazulu and Orlando Pirates.

He also played for South Africa national football team at the 1997 FIFA Confederations Cup.

== Career ==
=== Kaizer Chiefs ===
After training with Chiefs for two hours, Jeff Butler recommended that Ndlanya should be signed. He was spotted by Ryder Mofokeng at the Toyota U21 Championship in the Daveyton Highlanders vs Kaizer Chiefs match in 1991. He scored a header on debut against Pretoria Callies. His second spell at Chiefs after Manning Rangers proved to be more productive where he scored nine goals in two games, five against Manning Rangers and four against Total Aces.

=== Turkey ===
He had had difficulty coping in Turkey he couldn't communicate with teammates but only his coach and South African teammate, Gordon Mill and Fani Madida.

== After Retirement ==
He is a head coach in the Vodacom League and owns a furniture business in Daveyton, Ideal Method Furnishers. He also hosts the Pollen Festive Games annually.

== Career statistics ==
=== International ===
Appearances and goals by national team and year
| National team | Year | Apps | Goals |
|---|---|---|---|
| South Africa | 1997 | 6 | 1 |
| South Africa | 1998 | 6 | 0 |
| South Africa | 1999 | 10 | 3 |
| South Africa | 2000 | 5 | 0 |
| South Africa | 2001 | 2 | 1 |
| Total | | 29 | 5 |

Scores and results list South Africa's goal tally first, score column indicates score after each Ndlanya goal.

List of international goals scored by Pollen Ndlanya
| No. | Date | Venue | Opponent | Score | Result | Competition | Ref. |
|---|---|---|---|---|---|---|---|
| 1 | 17 December 1997 | King Fahd International Stadium, Riyadh, Saudi Arabia | Uruguay | 3–3 | 3–4 | 1997 FIFA Confederations Cup | |
| 2 | 20 February 1999 | Botswana National Stadium, Gaborone, Botswana | Botswana | 1–0 | 2–1 | 1999 COSAFA Cup | |
| 3 | 31 July 1999 | Independence Stadium, Windhoek, Namibia | Namibia | 1–0 | 1–1 | 1999 COSAFA Cup | |
| 4 | 18 September 1999 | Newlands Stadium, Cape Town, South Africa | Saudi Arabia | 1–0 | 1–0 | Friendly | |
| 5 | 29 April 2001 | Estádio do Maxaquene, Maputo, Mozambique | Mozambique | 1–0 | 3–0 | 2001 COSAFA Cup | |
