= Phil Masinga =

South African soccer player and manager (1969–2019)

Personal information
- Full name: Philemon Raul Masinga
- Date of birth: 28 June 1969
- Place of birth: Klerksdorp, South Africa
- Date of death: 13 January 2019 (aged 49)
- Place of death: Johannesburg, South Africa
- Height: 6 ft 2 in (1.88 m)
- Position: Striker

Youth career
- Khuma Flamengo
- Kaizer Chiefs

Senior career*
| Years | Team | Apps | (Gls) |
| 1990–1991 | Jomo Cosmos | 88 | (23) |
| 1991–1994 | Mamelodi Sundowns | 108 | (98) |
| 1994–1996 | Leeds United | 31 | (5) |
| 1996–1997 | St. Gallen | 10 | (0) |
| 1997 | Salernitana | 16 | (4) |
| 1997–2001 | Bari | 75 | (24) |
| 2001–2002 | Al-Wahda | | |
| Total | | 328 | (154) |

International career
| 1992–2001 | South Africa | 58 | (18) |

Managerial career
- 2006: PJ Stars
- * Club domestic league appearances and goals

Philemon Raul Masinga (28 June 1969 – 13 January 2019) was a South African professional soccer player and manager who played as a striker from 1990 to 2002. He was born in Khuma in the city of Matlosana formerly known as Klerksdorp Municipality.

He played in the English Premier League for Leeds United, and Italian Serie A for Salernitana and Bari. He also played for Jomo Cosmos, Mamelodi Sundowns with his cousin Bennett Masinga, St. Gallen and Al-Wahda. He represented South Africa in 58 international games, scoring 18 goals. In 2006, he briefly went into football management with PJ Stars.

== Club career ==
Masinga made his debut for Jomo Cosmos in 1990, before moving on to Mamelodi Sundowns.

In 1994 he left for English Premier League club Leeds United; the deal that his agent Marcelo Houseman did with Leeds manager Howard Wilkinson also involved Lucas Radebe moving to Leeds from Kaizer Chiefs. He played in the English Premier League for two years, playing 31 games and scoring five goals, and also scored a hat-trick in an FA Cup tie against Walsall on 17 January 1995.

Masinga moved to Switzerland with St. Gallen in 1996, followed by spells in Italy with Salernitana and Bari. In 2001, a return to English Football with Coventry City fell through after he failed to secure a work permit, following which he moved to Al Wahda FC in Abu Dhabi where he completed his playing career.

== International career ==
Masinga made his international debut in July 1992 against Cameroon; this was South Africa's first match following readmission of the country to international football. Masinga soon became an important member of the national team as South Africa began its first qualification campaigns following its readmission to FIFA, attempting to qualify for the 1994 African Cup of Nations and the 1994 FIFA World Cup. Although neither campaign ended in qualification, Masinga holds the distinction of scoring the country's first goal in World Cup qualifying since its return to international football, when he netted the winner against Congo in a 1–0 victory that secured South Africa's first win and first point of the campaign, as well as becoming the first South African footballer to be sent off in an international match when he received a red card in an Africa Cup of Nations qualifying fixture against Zambia. He was in the Bafana Bafana side when South Africa won the 1996 Africa Cup of Nations and when they finished second to Egypt in the 1998 Africa Cup of Nations. "Chippa", as he was affectionately known, scored the decisive goal in the 1997 game against the Republic of the Congo that took South Africa to the 1998 FIFA World Cup in France. He played 58 games for his country, scoring 18 goals.

== Managerial career ==
In 2006, Masinga briefly coached PJ Stars, a now-defunct third-division South African club.

== Death ==
On 13 January 2019, Masinga died in Johannesburg. He had been admitted to hospital the previous month, due to cancer.

== Career statistics ==
| Goal | Date | Venue | Opponent | Score | Result | Competition |
|---|---|---|---|---|---|---|
| 1 | 11 July 1992 | FNB Stadium, Johannesburg, South Africa | Cameroon | 1–1 | 2–2 | Friendly |
| 2 | 24 October 1992 | FNB Stadium, Johannesburg, South Africa | Congo | 1–0 | 1–0 | 1994 World Cup qualification |
| 3 | 25 July 1993 | Sir Aneroid Jugnauth Stadium, Belle Vue Maurel, Mauritius | Mauritius | 3–0 | 3–0 | 1994 Africa Cup of Nations qualification |
| 4 | 24 April 1994 | Mmabatho Stadium, Mmabatho, South Africa | Zimbabwe | 1–0 | 1–0 | Friendly |
| 5 | 4 September 1994 | Mahamasina Municipal Stadium, Antananarivo, Madagascar | Madagascar | 1–0 | 1–0 | 1996 Africa Cup of Nations qualification |
| 6 | 15 October 1994 | Odi Stadium, Mabopane, South Africa | Mauritius | 1–0 | 1–0 | 1996 Africa Cup of Nations qualification |
| 7 | 13 January 1996 | FNB Stadium, Johannesburg, South Africa | Cameroon | 1–0 | 3–0 | 1996 Africa Cup of Nations |
| 8 | 24 April 1996 | FNB Stadium, Johannesburg, South Africa | Brazil | 1–0 | 2–3 | Friendly |
| 9 | 9 November 1996 | FNB Stadium, Johannesburg, South Africa | Zaire | 1–0 | 1–0 | 1998 World Cup qualification |
| 10 | 27 April 1997 | Stade Municipal, Lomé, Togo | Zaire | 2–1 | 2–1 | 1998 World Cup qualification |
| 11 | 24 May 1997 | Old Trafford, Manchester, England | England | 1–1 | 1–2 | Friendly |
| 12 | 8 June 1997 | FNB Stadium, Johannesburg, South Africa | Zambia | 2–0 | 3–0 | 1998 World Cup qualification |
| 13 | 16 August 1997 | FNB Stadium, Johannesburg, South Africa | Congo | 1–0 | 1–0 | 1998 World Cup qualification |
| 14 | 24 January 1998 | Independence Stadium, Windhoek, South Africa | Namibia | 2–1 | 2–3 | 1998 COSAFA Cup |
| 15 | 23 January 1999 | King George V Stadium, Curepipe, Mauritius | Mauritius | 1–0 | 1–1 | 2000 Africa Cup of Nations qualification |
| 16 | 27 February 1999 | Odi Stadium, Mabopane, South Africa | Gabon | 2–1 | 4–1 | 2000 Africa Cup of Nations qualification |
| 17 | 16 December 2000 | FNB Stadium, Johannesburg, South Africa | Liberia | 2–0 | 2–1 | 2002 Africa Cup of Nations qualification |
| 18 | 25 February 2001 | Chichiri Stadium, Blantyre, Malawi | Malawi | 1–0 | 2–1 | 2002 World Cup qualification |

== Honours ==
Jomo Cosmos

- Nedbank Cup: 1990

Mamelodi Sundowns

- National Soccer League: 1993

South Africa

- Africa Cup of Nations: 1996; runner-up: 1998

== See also ==
- List of African association football families
