= Helman Mkhalele =

South African soccer player

Personal information
- Full name: Helman Nkosiyethu Mkhalele
- Date of birth: 20 October 1969 (age 57)
- Place of birth: Newcastle, South Africa
- Height: 1.80 m (5 ft 11 in)
- Position: Midfielder

Senior career*
Years	Team	Apps	(Gls)
1990–1993	Jomo Cosmos	97	(25)
1993–1997	Orlando Pirates	138	(23)
1997–1998	Kayserispor	23	(6)
1998–2001	Ankaragücü	58	(1)
2001–2003	Göztepe	53	(3)
2003–2005	Malatyaspor	50	(3)
2005–2008	Jomo Cosmos	14	(1)

International career
1994–2001	South Africa	66	(8)

Managerial career
- 2020-2022: South Africa (assistant coach)
- 2021-2022: South Africa under-23
- 2021-2022: South Africa (caretaker)
- 2022-: South Africa (assistant coach)
- * Club domestic league appearances and goals

Helman Nkosiyethu Mkhalele (born 20 October 1969) is a South African former soccer player who played as a midfielder.

== Club career ==
He was the part of the Orlando Pirates squad that won the 1994 National Soccer League and 1995 African Cup of Champions Clubs.

He also scored to help Pirates to victory in the replayed final of the 1996 BP Top 8.

== International career ==
Mkhalele played for South Africa national football team, earning 66 caps and scoring 8 goals in the process and was in part of the squad that travelled to France for the 1998 FIFA World Cup. He was also part of the Bafana squad that lifted the 1996 African Cup of Nations. He made his debut on 26 November 1994 against Ghana when he was 25 years and 37 days old, he played his last international on 5 May 2001 against Zimbabwe when he was 31 years and 197 days. His international career lasted for 6 years and 160 days.

== Personal life ==
His brothers Sydney Mkhalele and Lazarus Mkhalele played in the NPSL. As of 2013 he resided in Roodepoort

== After retirement ==
Mkhalele got a job as a facilitator at KBC Health and Safety Company. He owned a furniture business, and acquired a teachers' diploma at the Soweto College He also became coach of the National under 20 coach football team.

There are townships in South Africa that are named after him; one is Mkhelele (also called Evaton West) in Evaton which is located in the south of Johannesburg.

== Career statistics ==
=== International goals ===
Scores and results list South Africa's goal tally first, score column indicates score after each Mkhalele goal.

No.	Date	Venue	Opponent	Score	Result	Competition
1	26 April 1995	Setsoto Stadium, Maseru, Lesotho	Lesotho	3–0	3–1	Friendly
2	24 November 1995	Mmabatho Stadium, Mafikeng, South Africa	Egypt	1–0	2–0	1995 Simba Cup
3	8 June 1997	First National Bank Stadium, Johannesburg, South Africa	Zambia	1–0	3–0	1998 FIFA World Cup qualification
4	7 December 1997	Ellis Park Stadium, Johannesburg, South Africa	Brazil	1–2	1–2	Friendly
5	13 December 1997	King Fahd II Stadium, Riyadh, Saudi Arabia	Czech Republic	2–2	2–2	1997 FIFA Confederations Cup
6	17 December 1997	King Fahd II Stadium, Riyadh, Saudi Arabia	Uruguay	2–3	3–4	1997 FIFA Confederations Cup
7	11 February 1998	Stade Municipal, Bobo-Dioulasso, Burkina Faso	Ivory Coast	1–1	1–1	1998 Africa Cup of Nations
8	20 June 1999	Estádio da Cidadela, Luanda, Angola	Angola	1–0	2–2	2000 African Cup of Nations qualification
