= 1996 AFC Asian Cup final =

Association football match

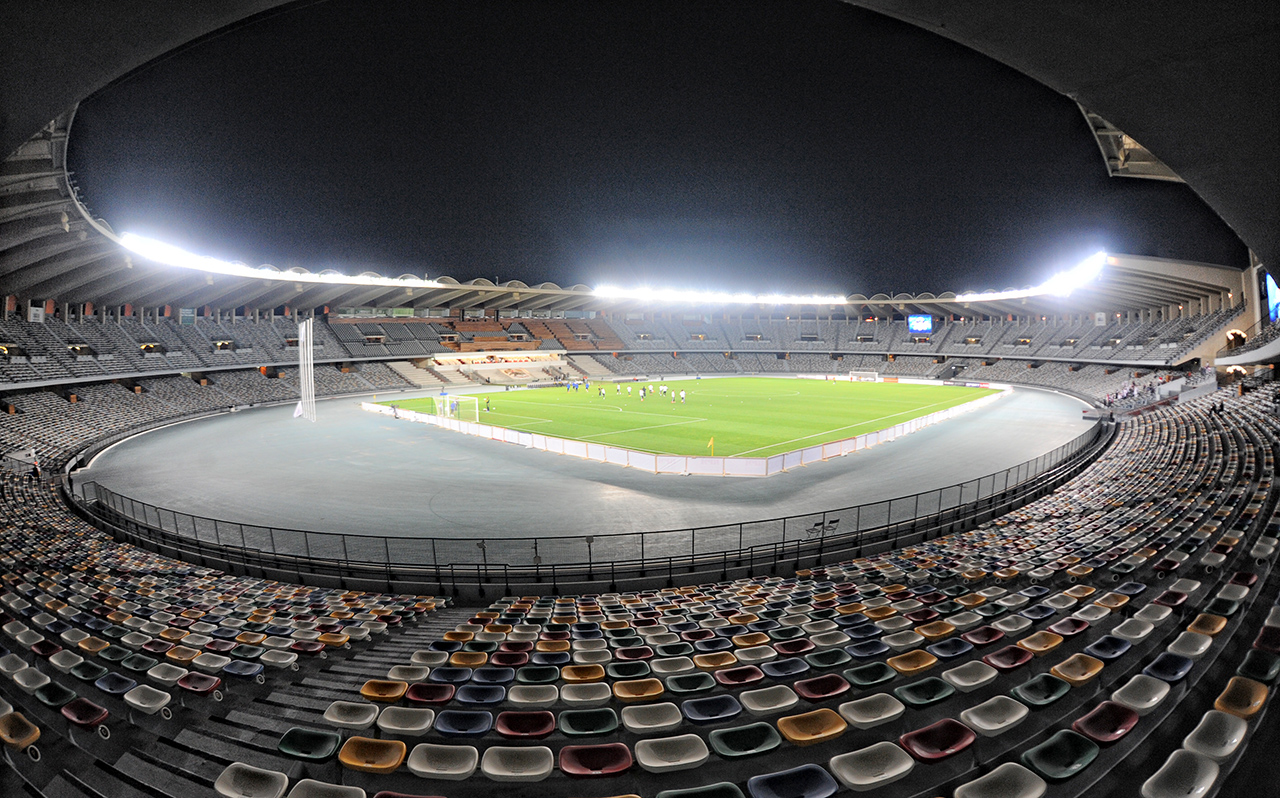
- The Sheikh Zayed Stadium (pictured in 2013), now known as the Zayed Sports City Stadium, hosted the final
- Event: 1996 AFC Asian Cup
United Arab Emirates	Saudi Arabia
(United Arab Emirates)	(Saudi Arabia)
0	0
- After extra time Saudi Arabia won 4–2 on penalties
- Date: 21 December 1996
- Venue: Shiekh Zayed Stadium, Abu Dhabi
- Referee: Mohd Nazri Abdullah (Malaysia)
- Attendance: 60,000

The 1996 AFC Asian Cup final was a football match which determined the winner of the 1996 AFC Asian Cup, the 11th edition of the AFC Asian Cup, a quadrennial tournament contested by the men's national teams of the member associations of the Asian Football Confederation.

== Venue ==
The Sheikh Zayed Stadium (now known as the Zayed Sports City Stadium) in Abu Dhabi hosted the final. The 43,206-seat stadium was built in 1980. It was the main stadium of the 1996 Asian Cup, hosting 12 matches including the final.

== Route to the final ==
United Arab Emirates
Round
Saudi Arabia
Opponents
Result
Group stage
Opponents
Result
South Korea
1–1
Match 1
Thailand
6–0
Kuwait
3–2
Match 2
Iraq
1–0
Indonesia
2–0
Match 3
Iran
0–3
Group A Winners

Pos	Team	Pld	Pts
1	United Arab Emirates (H)	3	7
2	Kuwait	3	4
3	South Korea	3	4
4	Indonesia	3	1

Source: RSSSF
(H) Hosts

Final standings
Group B Runners-up

Pos	Team	Pld	Pts
1	Iran	3	6
2	Saudi Arabia	3	6
3	Iraq	3	6
4	Thailand	3	0

Source: RSSSF

Opponents
Result
Knockout stage
Opponents
Result
Iraq
1–0
Quarter-finals
China
4–3
Kuwait
1–0
Semi-finals
Iran
0–0 (a.e.t.) (4–3 pen.)

== Match ==
=== Summary ===
The game ended goalless, the UAE ended up losing on penalties.

=== Details ===
21 December 1996
19:30

United Arab Emirates	0–0 (a.e.t.)	Saudi Arabia
	Report
Penalties
M. Ali (penalty scored); Saleh (penalty missed); K. Saad (penalty scored); Saeed (penalty missed)	2–4	(penalty scored) Al-Thunayan; (penalty scored) Zubromawi; (penalty missed) Al-Harbi; (penalty scored) Al-Temawi; (penalty scored) Al-Muwallid

Sheikh Zayed Stadium, Abu Dhabi
Attendance: 60,000
Referee: Mohd Nazri Abdullah (Malaysia)

GK	17	Muhsin Musabah
RB	6	Ismail Rashid Ismail
CB	5	Yousef Saleh
CB	12	Hassan Mubarak
LB	3	Munther Abdullah
CM	15	Mohamed Ali
CM	16	Hassan Saeed	(yellow card) 16'
CM	18	Ahmed Ibrahim Ali	(yellow card) 53'
RF	7	Saad Bakheet Mubarak		(substituted off) 46'
CF	10	Adnan Al Talyani (c)		(substituted off) 91'
LF	23	Abdel Ahmed		(substituted off) 46'
Substitutions:
MF	13	Abdul Aziz Mohamed		(substituted on) 46'
FW	11	Zuhair Bakhit		(substituted on) 46'
FW	14	Khamees Saad Mubarak		(substituted on) 91'
Manager:
(Croatia) Tomislav Ivić

GK	1	Mohamed Al-Deayea
RB	2	Mohammed Al-Jahani
CB	3	Mohammed Al-Khilaiwi		(substituted off) 77'
CB	4	Abdullah Zubromawi
LB	13	Hussein Abdulghani	(yellow card) 72' (yellow-red card) 87'
DM	16	Khamis Al-Owairan
RM	10	Fahad Al-Mehallel		(substituted off) 80'
CM	8	Khalid Al-Temawi
CM	14	Khaled Al-Muwallid
LM	15	Yousuf Al-Thunayan (c)
CF	9	Sami Al-Jaber		(substituted off) 62'
Substitutions:
CF	25	Abdullah Al-Dosari		(substituted on) 62'
MF	12	Ibrahim Al-Harbi		(substituted on) 77'
FW	20	Hamzah Idris		(substituted on) 80'
Manager:
(Portugal) Nelo Vingada
