= 1997 FIFA Confederations Cup squads =

The following below are the squads of the teams that participated in the 1997 FIFA Confederations Cup.

== Group A ==
=== Australia ===
Head coach: (England) Terry Venables

No.	Pos.	Player	Date of birth (age)	Caps	Club
1	GK	Mark Bosnich	13 January 1972 (aged 25)		(England) Aston Villa
2	DF	Steve Horvat	4 March 1971 (aged 26)		(Australia) Carlton
3	MF	Stan Lazaridis	16 August 1972 (aged 25)		(England) West Ham United
4	DF	Milan Ivanović	21 December 1968 (aged 28)		(Australia) Adelaide City
5	DF	Alex Tobin (c)	3 November 1965 (aged 32)		(Australia) Adelaide City
6	DF	Ned Zelic	4 July 1971 (aged 26)		(Germany) 1860 Munich
7	MF	Robbie Slater	22 November 1964 (aged 33)		(England) Southampton
8	MF	Craig Foster	15 April 1969 (aged 28)		(England) Portsmouth
9	FW	Mark Viduka	9 October 1975 (aged 22)		(Croatia) Dinamo Zagreb
10	FW	Aurelio Vidmar	3 February 1967 (aged 30)		(Spain) Tenerife
11	FW	Harry Kewell	22 September 1978 (aged 19)		(England) Leeds United
12	DF	Matthew Bingley	16 August 1971 (aged 26)		(Japan) Vissel Kobe
13	DF	Robbie Hooker	6 March 1967 (aged 30)		(Australia) Sydney United
14	DF	Tony Vidmar	4 July 1970 (aged 27)		(Scotland) Rangers
15	MF	Josip Skoko	10 December 1975 (aged 22)		(Croatia) Hajduk Split
16	FW	Paul Trimboli	25 February 1969 (aged 28)		(Australia) South Melbourne
17	FW	Damian Mori	30 September 1970 (aged 27)		(Australia) Adelaide City
18	FW	John Aloisi	5 February 1976 (aged 21)		(England) Portsmouth
19	MF	Ernie Tapai	14 February 1967 (aged 30)		(Australia) Perth Glory
20	GK	Zeljko Kalac	16 December 1972 (aged 24)		(Australia) Sydney United
21	DF	Kevin Muscat	7 August 1973 (aged 24)		(England) Wolverhampton Wanderers

=== Brazil ===
Head coach: Mário Zagallo

No.	Pos.	Player	Date of birth (age)	Caps	Club
1	GK	Dida	7 October 1973 (aged 24)		(Brazil) Cruzeiro
2	DF	Cafu	7 June 1970 (aged 27)		(Italy) Roma
3	DF	Aldair	30 November 1965 (aged 32)		(Italy) Roma
4	DF	Júnior Baiano	14 March 1970 (aged 27)		(Brazil) Flamengo
5	MF	Dunga (c)	31 October 1963 (aged 34)		(Japan) Júbilo Iwata
6	DF	Roberto Carlos	10 April 1973 (aged 24)		(Spain) Real Madrid
7	FW	Bebeto	16 February 1964 (aged 33)		(Brazil) Cruzeiro
8	MF	Flávio Conceição	12 June 1974 (aged 23)		(Spain) Deportivo La Coruña
9	FW	Ronaldo	22 September 1976 (aged 21)		(Italy) Inter Milan
10	MF	Leonardo	5 September 1969 (aged 28)		(Italy) Milan
11	FW	Romário	29 January 1966 (aged 31)		(Spain) Valencia
12	GK	Rogério Ceni	22 January 1973 (aged 24)		(Brazil) São Paulo
13	DF	Zé María	25 July 1973 (aged 24)		(Italy) Parma
14	DF	Gonçalves	22 June 1966 (aged 31)		(Brazil) Cruzeiro
15	DF	Zé Roberto	6 July 1974 (aged 23)		(Spain) Real Madrid
16	MF	César Sampaio	31 March 1968 (aged 29)		(Japan) Yokohama Flügels
17	MF	Doriva	28 May 1972 (aged 25)		(Brazil) Atlético Mineiro
18	FW	Denílson	24 August 1977 (aged 20)		(Brazil) São Paulo
19	MF	Juninho Paulista	22 February 1973 (aged 24)		(Spain) Atlético Madrid
20	MF	Rivaldo	19 April 1972 (aged 25)		(Spain) Barcelona
21	MF	Rodrigo Fabri	15 January 1976 (aged 21)		(Brazil) Portuguesa
22	DF	Russo	16 June 1976 (aged 21)		(Brazil) Vitória

=== Mexico ===
Head coach: Manuel Lapuente

No.	Pos.	Player	Date of birth (age)	Caps	Club
1	GK	Oswaldo Sánchez	21 September 1973 (aged 24)		(Mexico) América
2	DF	Claudio Suárez (c)	17 December 1968 (aged 28)		(Mexico) Guadalajara
3	DF	Francisco Gabriel de Anda	5 June 1971 (aged 26)		(Mexico) Santos Laguna
4	MF	Germán Villa	2 April 1973 (aged 24)		(Mexico) América
5	DF	Duilio Davino	21 March 1976 (aged 21)		(Mexico) América
6	MF	Raúl Lara	28 February 1973 (aged 24)		(Mexico) América
7	MF	Ramón Ramírez	5 December 1969 (aged 28)		(Mexico) Guadalajara
8	MF	Braulio Luna	8 September 1974 (aged 23)		(Mexico) UNAM
9	FW	Paulo Chávez	7 January 1976 (aged 21)		(Mexico) Guadalajara
10	FW	Luis García	1 June 1969 (aged 28)		(Mexico) Atlante
11	FW	Cuauhtémoc Blanco	17 January 1973 (aged 24)		(Mexico) Necaxa
12	GK	Óscar Pérez	1 February 1973 (aged 24)		(Mexico) Cruz Azul
13	DF	Pável Pardo	26 June 1976 (aged 21)		(Mexico) Atlas
14	DF	Isaac Terrazas	17 April 1975 (aged 22)		(Mexico) América
15	FW	Luis Hernández	22 December 1968 (aged 28)		(Argentina) Boca Juniors
16	MF	Markus López	17 June 1972 (aged 25)		(Mexico) Tecos UAG
17	FW	Francisco Palencia	28 April 1973 (aged 24)		(Mexico) Cruz Azul
18	DF	Salvador Carmona	22 August 1975 (aged 22)		(Mexico) Toluca
19	FW	Noe Zárate	11 May 1973 (aged 24)		(Mexico) Guadalajara
20	MF	José Manuel Abundis	11 June 1973 (aged 24)		(Mexico) Toluca

=== Saudi Arabia ===
Head coach: (Germany) Otto Pfister

No.	Pos.	Player	Date of birth (age)	Caps	Club
1	GK	Mohamed Al-Deayea	2 August 1972 (aged 25)		(Saudi Arabia) Al-Tai
2	DF	Mohammed Al-Jahani	28 September 1974 (aged 23)		(Saudi Arabia) Al-Ahli
3	DF	Mohammed Al-Khilaiwi	1 September 1971 (aged 26)		(Saudi Arabia) Al-Ittihad
4	DF	Abdullah Zubromawi	15 November 1973 (aged 24)		(Saudi Arabia) Al-Ahli
5	DF	Ahmed Jamil Madani	6 January 1970 (aged 27)		(Saudi Arabia) Al-Ittihad
6	MF	Ibrahim Al-Harbi	10 July 1975 (aged 22)		(Saudi Arabia) Al-Nassr
7	FW	Ibrahim Al-Shahrani	21 July 1974 (aged 23)		(Saudi Arabia) Al-Ahli
8	MF	Khalid Al Temawi	19 April 1969 (aged 28)		(Saudi Arabia) Al-Hilal
9	FW	Sami Al-Jaber	11 December 1972 (aged 25)		(Saudi Arabia) Al-Hilal
10	FW	Saeed Al-Owairan	19 August 1967 (aged 30)		(Saudi Arabia) Al-Shabab
11	FW	Fahad Al-Mehallel	11 November 1970 (aged 27)		(Saudi Arabia) Al-Shabab
12	DF	Ahmed Dokhi	25 October 1976 (aged 21)		(Saudi Arabia) Al-Hilal
13	DF	Hussein Abdulghani	23 January 1977 (aged 20)		(Saudi Arabia) Al-Ahli
14	MF	Khaled Al-Muwallid (c)	23 November 1971 (aged 26)		(Saudi Arabia) Al-Ahli
15	GK	Hussein Al-Sadiq	15 October 1973 (aged 24)		(Saudi Arabia) Al-Qadisiya
16	MF	Khamis Al-Dossari	8 September 1973 (aged 24)		(Saudi Arabia) Al-Ittihad
17	MF	Mohammad Al-Sahafi	3 October 1975 (aged 22)		(Saudi Arabia) Al-Ittihad
18	FW	Khamis Al-Zahrani	3 August 1976 (aged 21)		(Saudi Arabia) Al-Ittihad
19	FW	Obeid Al-Dosari	2 October 1975 (aged 22)		(Saudi Arabia) Al-Wehda
20	MF	Hamzah Saleh	19 April 1967 (aged 30)		(Saudi Arabia) Al-Ahli
21	DF	Mohaisen Al-Jam'an	6 April 1966 (aged 31)		(Saudi Arabia) Al-Nassr
22	GK	Turki Awad			(Saudi Arabia) Al-Hilal

== Group B ==
=== Czech Republic ===
Head coach: Dušan Uhrin

No.	Pos.	Player	Date of birth (age)	Caps	Club
1	GK	Pavel Srníček	10 March 1968 (aged 29)		(England) Newcastle United
2	DF	Ivo Ulich	5 September 1974 (aged 23)		(Czech Republic) Slavia Prague
3	DF	Luboš Kozel	16 March 1971 (aged 26)		(Czech Republic) Slavia Prague
4	MF	Pavel Nedvěd	30 August 1972 (aged 25)		(Italy) Lazio
5	DF	Michal Horňák	28 April 1970 (aged 27)		(Czech Republic) Slavia Prague
6	MF	Zdeněk Svoboda	20 May 1972 (aged 25)		(Czech Republic) Sparta Prague
7	MF	Jiří Němec (c)	16 May 1966 (aged 31)		(Germany) Schalke 04
8	MF	Karel Poborský	30 March 1972 (aged 25)		(England) Manchester United
9	FW	Pavel Kuka	19 July 1968 (aged 29)		(Germany) 1. FC Kaiserslautern
10	FW	Horst Siegl	15 February 1969 (aged 28)		(Czech Republic) Sparta Prague
11	MF	Radek Bejbl	29 August 1972 (aged 25)		(Spain) Atlético Madrid
12	DF	Karel Rada	2 March 1971 (aged 26)		(Turkey) Trabzonspor
13	DF	Petr Vlček	18 October 1973 (aged 24)		(Czech Republic) Slavia Prague
14	MF	Radek Slončík	29 May 1973 (aged 24)		(Czech Republic) Baník Ostrava
15	MF	Edvard Lasota	7 March 1971 (aged 26)		(Czech Republic) Slavia Prague
16	FW	Vratislav Lokvenc	27 September 1973 (aged 24)		(Czech Republic) Sparta Prague
17	MF	Vladimír Šmicer	24 May 1973 (aged 24)		(France) Lens
18	DF	Milan Fukal	16 May 1975 (aged 22)		(Czech Republic) Jablonec
19	MF	Martin Frýdek	9 March 1969 (aged 28)		(Germany) Bayer Leverkusen
20	GK	Ladislav Maier	4 January 1966 (aged 31)		(Czech Republic) Slovan Liberec

=== South Africa ===
Head coach: (South Africa) Clive Barker

No.	Pos.	Player	Date of birth (age)	Caps	Club
1	GK	Andre Arendse	27 June 1967 (aged 30)		(England) Fulham
2	DF	Sizwe Motaung	7 January 1970 (aged 27)		(South Africa) Kaizer Chiefs
3	DF	David Nyathi	2 March 1969 (aged 28)		(Switzerland) St. Gallen
4	DF	Willem Jackson	26 March 1972 (aged 25)		(South Africa) Orlando Pirates
5	DF	Mark Fish	14 March 1974 (aged 23)		(England) Bolton Wanderers
6	FW	Phil Masinga	28 June 1969 (aged 28)		(Italy) Bari
7	MF	Clinton Larsen	17 February 1971 (aged 26)		(South Africa) Manning Rangers
8	MF	Dumisa Ngobe	5 March 1973 (aged 24)		(South Africa) Orlando Pirates
9	DF	Neil Tovey	2 July 1962 (aged 35)		(South Africa) Kaizer Chiefs
10	MF	John Moshoeu	18 December 1965 (aged 31)		(Turkey) Kocaelispor
11	MF	Helman Mkhalele	20 October 1969 (aged 28)		(Turkey) Kayserispor
12	FW	Brendan Augustine	26 October 1971 (aged 26)		(Austria) LASK
13	FW	Pollen Ndlanya	22 May 1970 (aged 27)		(Turkey) Bursaspor
14	FW	Mark Williams	11 August 1966 (aged 31)		(South Africa) Kaizer Chiefs
15	MF	Doctor Khumalo	26 June 1967 (aged 30)		(South Africa) Kaizer Chiefs
16	GK	Brian Baloyi	10 March 1974 (aged 23)		(South Africa) Kaizer Chiefs
17	MF	Jabulani Mnguni	9 December 1972 (aged 25)		(South Africa) Vaal Professionals
18	MF	John Moeti	20 August 1966 (aged 31)		(South Africa) Orlando Pirates
19	DF	Lucas Radebe (c)	12 April 1969 (aged 28)		(England) Leeds United
20	MF	Eric Tinkler	30 July 1970 (aged 27)		(England) Barnsley

=== United Arab Emirates ===
Head coach: (Czech Republic) Milan Máčala

No.	Pos.	Player	Date of birth (age)	Caps	Club
1	GK	Juma Rashed	12 December 1972 (aged 24)		(United Arab Emirates) Al-Shabab
2	DF	Abdulla Essa Al-Falasi	6 May 1977 (aged 20)		(United Arab Emirates) Al-Wasl
3	DF	Munther Abdullah	12 January 1975 (aged 22)		(United Arab Emirates) Al-Wasl
4	DF	Abdulrahman Al-Haddad	23 March 1966 (aged 31)		(United Arab Emirates) Sharjah
5	MF	Hassan Mubarak	13 April 1968 (aged 29)		(United Arab Emirates) Al-Nasr
6	MF	Ismail Rashid Ismail	27 October 1972 (aged 25)		(United Arab Emirates) Al-Wasl
7	MF	Saad Bakheet Mubarak	15 October 1970 (aged 27)		(United Arab Emirates) Al-Shabab
8	FW	Ahmed Adel	5 November 1974 (aged 22)		(United Arab Emirates) Kalba
9	FW	Nasir Khamees	2 August 1965 (aged 31)		(United Arab Emirates) Al-Wasl
10	MF	Adnan Al Talyani (c)	30 October 1964 (aged 33)		(United Arab Emirates) Al Shaab Club
11	FW	Yaser Salem Ali	5 December 1977 (aged 20)		(United Arab Emirates) Al-Wahda
12	GK	Yaqout Mubarak	16 July 1974 (aged 23)		(United Arab Emirates) Al-Nasr
13	DF	Abdulsalam Jumaa	23 May 1977 (aged 20)		(United Arab Emirates) Al-Wahda
14	MF	Khamees Saad Mubarak	4 October 1970 (aged 27)		(United Arab Emirates) Al-Shabab
15	MF	Abdulaziz Mohamed	12 December 1965 (aged 32)		(United Arab Emirates) Al-Nasr
16	MF	Ahmed Saeed	15 November 1973 (aged 24)		(United Arab Emirates) Kalba
17	GK	Muhsin Musabah	1 October 1964 (aged 33)		(United Arab Emirates) Sharjah
18	MF	Ahmed Ibrahim Ali	15 November 1970 (aged 27)		(United Arab Emirates) Sharjah
19	MF	Gholam Ali	3 September 1974 (aged 23)		(United Arab Emirates) Al-Wasl
20	DF	Mohamed Obaid Al-Zahiri	1 August 1967 (aged 30)		(United Arab Emirates) Al-Ain

=== Uruguay ===
Head coach: Víctor Púa

No.	Pos.	Player	Date of birth (age)	Caps	Club
1	GK	Carlos Nicola	3 January 1973 (aged 24)		(Uruguay) Nacional
2	DF	Diego López	22 August 1974 (aged 23)		(Spain) Racing Santander
3	DF	Paolo Montero (c)	3 September 1971 (aged 26)		(Italy) Juventus
4	DF	Gustavo Méndez	3 February 1971 (aged 26)		(Italy) Vicenza
5	MF	Gonzalo de los Santos	19 July 1976 (aged 21)		(Spain) Mérida
6	MF	Edgardo Adinolfi	27 March 1974 (aged 23)		(Uruguay) Peñarol
7	MF	Pablo García	11 May 1977 (aged 20)		(Uruguay) Wanderers
8	MF	Líber Vespa	18 October 1971 (aged 26)		(Argentina) Argentinos Juniors
9	FW	Marcelo Zalayeta	5 December 1978 (aged 19)		(Uruguay) Peñarol
10	MF	Nicolás Olivera	30 May 1978 (aged 19)		(Spain) Valencia
11	FW	Darío Silva	2 November 1972 (aged 25)		(Italy) Cagliari
12	GK	Claudio Flores	10 May 1976 (aged 21)		(Uruguay) Peñarol
13	DF	Pablo Hernández	2 May 1975 (aged 22)		(Uruguay) Defensor Sporting
14	MF	Christian Callejas	17 May 1978 (aged 19)		(Uruguay) Danubio
15	DF	Carlos Díaz	4 February 1979 (aged 18)		(Uruguay) Defensor Sporting
16	DF	César Pellegrín	5 March 1979 (aged 18)		(Uruguay) Danubio
17	MF	Fabián Coelho	20 January 1977 (aged 20)		(Uruguay) Nacional
18	DF	Martín Rivas	17 February 1977 (aged 20)		(Uruguay) Danubio
19	FW	Antonio Pacheco	11 April 1976 (aged 21)		(Uruguay) Peñarol
20	FW	Álvaro Recoba	17 March 1976 (aged 21)		(Italy) Inter Milan
