= Syria at the AFC Asian Cup =

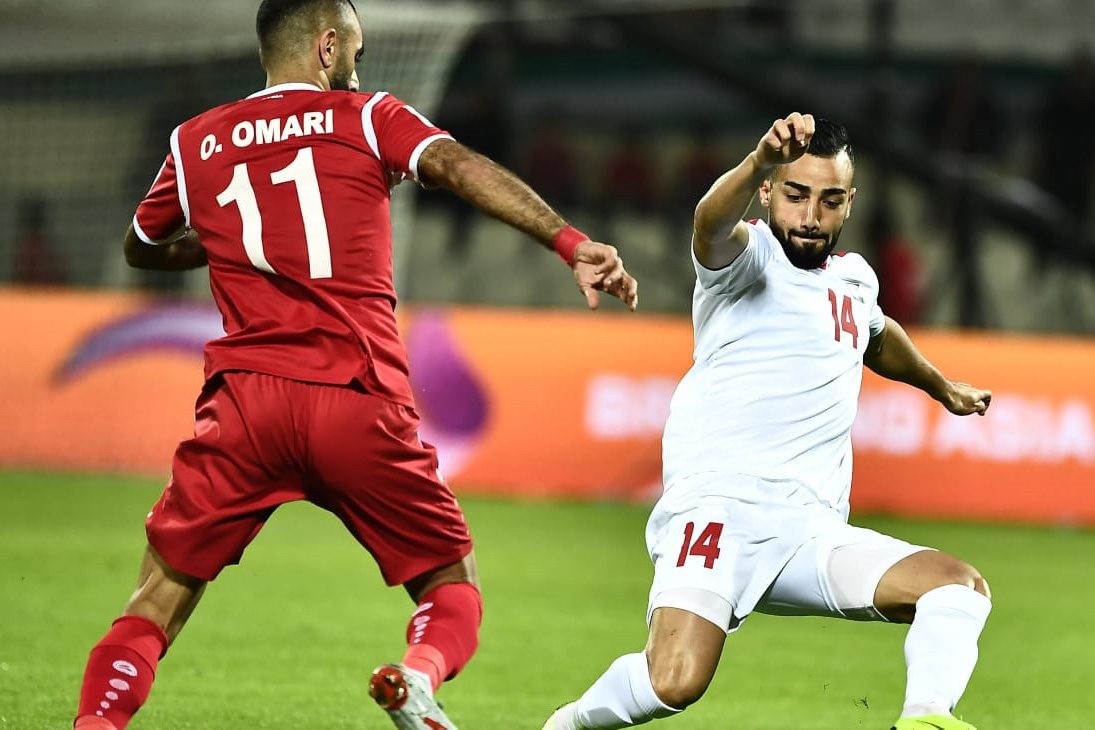
Syria during the 2019 Asian Cup match against Palestine.

Syria has been a major participant in the AFC Asian Cup with seven appearances in the tournament, in 1980, 1984, 1988, 1996, 2011, 2019, and 2023. At 2023 Asian Cup, Omar Khribin scored the only goal in a 1–0 victory over India, which granted Syria its first win in the competition since 2011, and first ever qualification to the knockout phase as one of the best third-placed teams.

Until 2024, Syria have never qualified past the group stage in the Asian Cup, with them narrowly missing out on the knock-out stage in 1980 and knock-out stage in 1996 due to 1 missed point; both eliminations involved China national football team.

== AFC Asian Cup record ==
=== 1980 Kuwait ===
==== Group A ====
Team	Pld	W	D	L	GF	GA	GD	Pts
Iran	4	2	2	0	12	4	+8	6
North Korea	4	3	0	1	9	7	+2	6
Syria	4	2	1	1	3	2	+1	5
China	4	1	1	2	9	5	+4	3
Bangladesh	4	0	0	4	2	17	−15	0

17 September 1980

Iran	0–0	Syria

Sabah Al-Salem Stadium, Kuwait City
Attendance: 15,000

19 September 1980

Bangladesh	0–1	Syria
		Keshek 7'

Sabah Al-Salem Stadium, Kuwait City

23 September 1980

Syria	1–0	China
Keshek 86'

Sabah Al-Salem Stadium, Kuwait City

26 September 1980

North Korea	2–1	Syria
		Suleiman

Sabah Al-Salem Stadium, Kuwait City

=== 1984 Singapore ===
==== Group A ====
Team	Pld	W	D	L	GF	GA	GD	Pts
Saudi Arabia	4	2	2	0	4	2	+2	6
Kuwait	4	2	1	1	4	2	+2	5
Qatar	4	1	2	1	3	3	0	4
Syria	4	1	1	2	3	5	−2	3
South Korea	4	0	2	2	1	3	−2	2

1 December 1984
19:00

Qatar	1–1	Syria
Khalfan 7'		Anber 47' (o.g.)

National Stadium, Singapore
Attendance: 8,000
Referee: Antonio Márquez (Mexico)

4 December 1984
21:00

Syria	0–1	Saudi Arabia
		Khalifa 66'

National Stadium, Singapore
Attendance: 2,000
Referee: Shizuo Takada (Japan)

7 December 1984
21:00

Syria	1–0	South Korea
Hassan 12'

National Stadium, Singapore
Attendance: 10,000
Referee: George Courtney (England)

9 December 1984
19:00

Kuwait	3–1	Syria
Mahrous 66' (o.g.); Al-Dakhil 77'; A. Al-Buloushi 79'		Abu Al-Sel 5'

National Stadium, Singapore
Attendance: 8,000
Referee: Cheung Kwok Kui (Hong Kong)

=== 1988 Qatar ===
==== Group B ====
Team	Pts	Pld	W	D	L	GF	GA	GD
Saudi Arabia	6	4	2	2	0	4	1	+3
China	5	4	2	1	1	6	3	+3
Syria	4	4	2	0	2	2	5	−3
Kuwait	3	4	0	3	1	2	3	−1
Bahrain	2	4	0	2	2	1	3	−2

2 December 1988
18:00

Syria	0–2	Saudi Arabia
	Report	Al-Mutlaq 20'; Al-Suwaiyed 82'

Qatar SC Stadium, Doha
Referee: Erik Fredriksson (Sweden)

4 December 1988
17:00

China	3–0	Syria
Gao Sheng 13'; Xie Yuxin 14', 19'	Report

Qatar SC Stadium, Doha
Referee: Mohamed Hansal (Algeria)

8 December 1988
17:00

Syria	1–0	Kuwait
Al-Nasser 63'	Report

Al-Ahly Stadium, Doha
Referee: Yusuf Namoğlu (Turkey)

11 December 1988
15:00

Bahrain	0–1	Syria
	Report	Abu Al-Sel 72' (pen.)

Qatar SC Stadium, Doha
Referee: Michel Vautrot (France)

=== 1996 United Arab Emirates ===
==== Group C ====
Team	Pts	Pld	W	D	L	GF	GA	GD
Japan	9	3	3	0	0	7	1	+6
China	3	3	1	0	2	3	3	0
Syria	3	3	1	0	2	3	6	−3
Uzbekistan	3	3	1	0	2	3	6	−3

6 December 1996
16:45

Japan	2–1	Syria
Abbas 85' (o.g.); Takagi 88'	Report	Jokhadar 8'

Tahnoun Bin Mohamed Stadium, Al Ain
Attendance: 10,000
Referee: Mohd Nazri Abdullah (Malaysia)

9 December 1996
19:00

Syria	0–3	China
	Report	Ma Mingyu 35'; Gao Feng 49'; Li Bing 73'

Tahnoun Bin Mohamed Stadium, Al Ain
Attendance: 3,000
Referee: Kim Young-Joo (South Korea)

12 December 1996
19:00

Uzbekistan	1–2	Syria
Lebedev 53' (pen.)	Report	Jokhadar 48'; Dib 74'

Tahnoun Bin Mohamed Stadium, Al Ain
Attendance: 2,000
Referee: Ali Bujsaim (United Arab Emirates)

=== 2011 Qatar ===
==== Group B ====
Team	Pld	W	D	L	GF	GA	GD	Pts
Japan	3	2	1	0	8	2	+6	7
Jordan	3	2	1	0	4	2	+2	7
Syria	3	1	0	2	4	5	−1	3
Saudi Arabia	3	0	0	3	1	8	−7	0

9 January 2011
Saudi Arabia	1–2	Syria
13 January 2011
Syria	1–2	Japan
17 January 2011
Jordan	2–1	Syria

=== 2019 United Arab Emirates ===
==== Group B ====
Pos	Team	Pld	W	D	L	GF	GA	GD	Pts	Qualification
1	Jordan	3	2	1	0	3	0	+3	7	Advance to knockout stage
2	Australia	3	2	0	1	6	3	+3	6	Advance to knockout stage
3	Palestine	3	0	2	1	0	3	−3	2	
4	Syria	3	0	1	2	2	5	−3	1	

Source: AFC
6 January 2019
20:00

Syria	0–0	Palestine
	Report

Sharjah Stadium, Sharjah
Attendance: 8,471
Referee: Ravshan Irmatov (Uzbekistan)

10 January 2019
17:30

Jordan	2–0	Syria
Al-Taamari 26'; Khattab 43'	Report

Khalifa bin Zayed Stadium, Al Ain
Attendance: 9,152
Referee: Kim Dong-jin (South Korea)

15 January 2019
17:30

Australia	3–2	Syria
Mabil 41'; Ikonomidis 54'; Rogic 90+3'	Report	Kharbin 43'; Al Somah 80' (pen.)

Khalifa bin Zayed Stadium, Al Ain
Attendance: 10,492
Referee: César Ramos (Mexico)

=== 2023 Qatar ===
==== Group B ====
Pos	Team	Pld	W	D	L	GF	GA	GD	Pts	Qualification
1	Australia	3	2	1	0	4	1	+3	7	Advance to knockout stage
2	Uzbekistan	3	1	2	0	4	1	+3	5	Advance to knockout stage
3	Syria	3	1	1	1	1	1	0	4	Advance to knockout stage
4	India	3	0	0	3	0	6	−6	0	

Source: AFC
13 January 2024
20:30

Uzbekistan	0–0	Syria
	Report

Jassim bin Hamad Stadium, Al Rayyan
Attendance: 10,198
Referee: Ahmed Al-Kaf (Oman)

18 January 2024
14:30

Syria	0–1	Australia
	Report	Irvine 59'

Jassim bin Hamad Stadium, Al Rayyan
Attendance: 10,097
Referee: Adel Al-Naqbi (United Arab Emirates)

23 January 2024
14:30

Syria	1–0	India
Khribin 76'	Report

Al Bayt Stadium, Al Khor
Attendance: 42,787
Referee: Sivakorn Pu-udom (Thailand)

Ranking of third-placed teams

Pos	Grp	Team	Pld	W	D	L	GF	GA	GD	Pts	Qualification
1	E	Jordan	3	1	1	1	6	3	+3	4	Advance to knockout stage
2	C	Palestine	3	1	1	1	5	5	0	4	Advance to knockout stage
3	B	Syria	3	1	1	1	1	1	0	4	Advance to knockout stage
4	D	Indonesia	3	1	0	2	3	6	−3	3	Advance to knockout stage
5	F	Oman	3	0	2	1	2	3	−1	2	
6	A	China	3	0	2	1	0	1	−1	2	

Source: AFC

==== Knockout stage ====
===== Round of 16 =====
31 January 2024
19:00

Iran	1–1 (a.e.t.)	Syria
Taremi 34' (pen.)	Report	Khribin 64' (pen.)
Penalties
Ansarifard (penalty scored); Rezaeian (penalty scored); Ebrahimi (penalty scored); Torabi (penalty scored); Hajsafi (penalty scored)	5–3	(penalty scored) Sabbag; (penalty missed) Youssef; (penalty scored) Ousou; (penalty scored) Al Dali

Abdullah bin Khalifa Stadium, Doha
Attendance: 8,720
Referee: Kim Jong-hyeok (South Korea)

== Overall record ==
AFC Asian Cup record								Qualification record					
Year	Round	Pld	W	D	L	GF	GA	Pld	W	D*	L	GF	GA
(Hong Kong) 1956	Did not enter							Declined participation					
(South Korea) 1960	Did not enter							Declined participation					
(Israel) 1964	Did not enter							Declined participation					
(Iran) 1968	Did not enter							Declined participation					
(Thailand) 1972	Did not qualify							3	0	2	1	4	5
(Iran) 1976	Withdrew							Withdrew					
(Kuwait) 1980	Round 1	4	2	1	1	3	2	3	2	1	0	2	0
(Singapore) 1984	Round 1	4	1	1	2	3	5	6	3	0	3	9	9
(Qatar) 1988	Round 1	4	2	0	2	2	5	4	3	1	0	8	2
(Japan) 1992	Did not qualify							2	1	0	1	3	4
(United Arab Emirates) 1996	Round 1	3	1	0	2	3	6	4	3	0	1	6	2
(Lebanon) 2000	Did not qualify							6	4	1	1	11	3
(China) 2004	Did not qualify							6	2	1	3	16	10
(Indonesia) (Malaysia) (Thailand) (Vietnam) 2007	Did not qualify							6	2	2	2	10	6
(Qatar) 2011	Round 1	3	1	0	2	4	5	6	4	2	0	10	2
(Australia) 2015	Did not qualify							6	1	1	4	7	7
(United Arab Emirates) 2019	Round 1	3	0	1	2	2	5	8	6	0	2	26	11
(Qatar) 2023	Round of 16	4	1	2	1	2	2	8	7	0	1	22	7
(Saudi Arabia) 2027	Qualified							12	8	1	3	30	14
Total	8/19	25	8	5	12	19	30	80	46	12	22	164	82

=== Record results ===
Syria's Asian Cup record
First match	Iran 0–0 Syria (17 September 1980; Kuwait City, Kuwait)
Biggest win	Uzbekistan 1–2 Syria (12 December 1996; Al Ain, United Arab Emirates); Saudi Arabia 1–2 Syria (9 January 2011; Al Rayyan, Qatar); Syria 1–0 India (23 January 2024; Al Khor, Qatar)
Biggest defeat	China 3–0 Syria (4 December 1988; Doha, Qatar); China 3–0 Syria (9 December 1996; Al Ain, United Arab Emirates)
Best result	Round of 16 (2023)
Worst result	Group stage (1980, 1984, 1988, 1996, 2011, 2019)

== Goalscorers ==
Player	Goals	1980	1984	1988	1996	2011	2019	2023
Omar Khribin	3						1	2
Walid Abu Al-Sel	2		1	1				
Jamal Keshek	2	2						
Nader Joukhadar	2				2			
Abdelrazaq Al-Hussain	2					2		
Total	11	2	1	1	2	2	1	2

- Only players with minimum 2 goals scored

== Head-to-head record ==
Opponent	Pld	W	D	L	GF	GA	GD	Win %
Australia	2	0	0	2	2	4	−2	0.00
Bahrain	1	1	0	0	1	0	+1	100.00
Bangladesh	1	1	0	0	1	0	+1	100.00
China	3	1	0	2	1	6	−5	33.33
India	1	1	0	0	1	0	+1	100.00
Iran	2	0	2	0	1	1	+0	0.00
Japan	2	0	0	2	2	4	−2	0.00
Jordan	2	0	0	2	1	4	−3	0.00
Kuwait	2	1	0	1	2	3	−1	50.00
North Korea	1	0	0	1	1	2	−1	0.00
Palestine	1	0	1	0	0	0	+0	0.00
Qatar	1	0	1	0	1	1	+0	0.00
Saudi Arabia	3	1	0	2	2	4	−2	33.33
South Korea	1	1	0	0	1	0	+1	100.00
Uzbekistan	2	1	1	0	2	1	+1	50.00
Total	25	8	5	12	19	30	−11	32.00
