= Syria national football team records and statistics =

The following is a list of the Syria national football team's competitive records and statistics. Their first international match was played on 19 April 1942 in Beirut against Lebanon, winning 2–1. The team they have played the most is Jordan, with a total of 40 matches played.

== Individual records ==
=== Player records ===
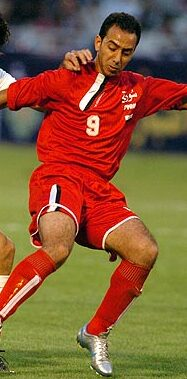
Maher Al-Sayed is Syria's first most-capped player with 109 caps.

As of 31 January 2024
Players in bold are still active with Syria.

==== Most capped players ====
Rank	Player	Caps	Goals	Career
1	Maher Al-Sayed	109	29	1999–2013
2	**Mahmoud Al-Mawas**	100	16	2012–present
3	Ali Diab	97	4	2004–2013
4	Mosab Balhous	86	0	2006–2016
5	Raja Rafe	84	32	2002–2015
6	Tarek Jabban	83	5	1996–2007
7	**Ibrahim Alma**	80	0	2012–present
8	Nizar Mahrous	76	12	1985–1993
9	George Khouri	74	8	1982–1989
10	**Moayad Ajan**	72	3	2012–present

=== Age records ===
- Oldest player to make debut: Firas Al-Khatib, aged 36 years and 94 days vs Philippines, 5 September 2019
- Youngest player to make debut: Abdelrazaq Al-Hussain, aged 17 years and 82 days vs China, 07 Dec 2002
- Oldest player to score: Firas Al-Khatib, aged 36 years and 94 days vs Philippines, 5 September 2019

== Team records ==
=== Wins ===
Largest win

- 13–0 vs Muscat and Oman on 6 September 1965
- 12–0 vs Maldives on 4 June 1997
- 12–0 vs Philippines on 30 April 2001

Largest home win

- 13–0 vs Muscat and Oman on 6 September 1965

Largest away win

- 12–0 vs Maldives on 4 June 1997

Largest win at the Asian Cup

- 2–1 vs Saudi Arabia on 9 January 2011
- 2–1 vs Uzbekistan on 12 December 1996

=== Draws ===
Highest scoring draw

- 3–3 vs Lebanon on 17 October 1998
- 3–3 vs Oman on 18 May 2001

Highest scoring draw at the Asian Cup

- 1–1 vs Qatar on 1 December 1984
- 1–1 vs Iran on 31 January 2024

=== Defeats ===
Largest defeat

- 8–0 vs Greece on 25 November 1949
- 8–0 vs Egypt on 16 October 1951
- 7–0 vs Turkey on 20 November 1949

Largest defeat at home

- 1–7 vs Iran on 21 June 2004

Largest defeat away

- 8–0 vs Greece on 25 November 1949
- 8–0 vs Egypt on 16 October 1951

Largest defeat at the Asian Cup

- 3–0 vs China on 9 December 1996
- 3–0 vs China on 4 December 1988

=== Attendance ===
Highest home attendance

- 50,000, vs Saudi Arabia, 30 March 1989

Highest away attendance

- 100,000, vs Iran, 13 June 1997

=== World rankings ===
==== FIFA ====
Source: FIFA.com

Highest FIFA ranking
68th (July 2018)
Lowest FIFA ranking
152nd (September 2014, March 2015)

==== Elo ====
Source: Eloratings.net

Highest Elo ranking
53rd (October 1974)
Lowest Elo ranking
125th (September 1984)

== Goal records ==
=== General ===
First goal
Mudhafar Al-Aqqad vs Jordan on 1 August 1953

Most goals
Firas Al-Khatib (2001–2019), 36 goals

Rank	Player	Goals	Caps	Ratio	Career
1	Firas Al-Khatib	36	72	0.5	2001–2019
2	Raja Rafe	32	84	0.38	2006–2016
3	Maher Al-Sayed	29	109	0.27	1999–2013
4	Omar Khribin	27	58	0.47	2012–present
5	Said Bayazid	24	24	1	1997–2001
6	Zyad Chaabo	22	49	0.45	2001–2010
7	Omar Al Somah	21	40	0.53	2012–2023
8	Mahmoud Al-Mawas	16	100	0.16	2012–present
9	Mohamed Al-Zeno	15	48	0.31	2004–2011
10	Avedis Kavlakian	14	—	—	1953–1966

As of 26 March 2024. Highlighted names denote a player still playing or available for selection.

=== Hat-tricks ===
As of 26 March 2024

Keys
Player scored 5 goals

Player	Competition	Against	Home/Away	Result	Goals	Date
Said Bayazid	2002 FIFA World Cup qualification	Philippines	Home	12–0	5	30 April 2001
Nader Joukhadar	1998 FIFA World Cup qualification	Maldives	Away	12–0	3	4 June 1997
Said Bayazid	2002 FIFA World Cup qualification	Laos	Home	11–0	3	7 May 2001
Said Bayazid	2002 FIFA World Cup qualification	Laos	Away	9–0	3	11 May 2001
Firas Al-Khatib	2004 AFC Asian Cup qualification	Sri Lanka	Away	8–0	3	18 October 2003
Omar Khribin	2026 FIFA World Cup qualification	Myanmar	Home	7–0	3	26 March 2024
Zyad Chaabo	2010 FIFA World Cup qualification	Indonesia	Home	7–0	3	18 November 2007
Raja Rafe	2010 FIFA World Cup qualification	Indonesia	Home	7–0	3	18 November 2007
Osama Omari	2018 FIFA World Cup qualification	Afghanistan	Home	5–2	3	13 October 2015
Omar Al Somah	2022 FIFA World Cup qualification	Guam	Home	4–0	3	15 October 2019
Mahmoud Al-Mawas	2022 FIFA World Cup qualification	Maldives	Away	4–0	3	4 June 2021
Raja Rafe	2002 Arab Nations Cup	Lebanon	Home	4–1	3	21 December 2002

=== In major tournaments ===
==== AFC Asian Cup ====
Syria shock Saudi Arabia at Asian Cup

— CNN on Abdulrazak Al Husein's brace against Saudi Arabia at the 2011 Asian Cup

Most goals in a single Asian Cup tournament
Jamal Keshek (in 1980), 2 goals
Nader Joukhadar (in 1996), 2 goals
Abdelrazaq Al-Hussain (in 2011), 2 goals
Omar Khribin (in 2023), 2 goals
Most goals in total at Asian Cup tournaments
Omar Khribin (in 2019, 2023), 3 goals
Most goals in a single Asian Cup finals match
A. Al-Hussain, 2 goals vs Saudi Arabia on 9 January 2011
First goal in an Asian Cup finals match
Jamal Keshek, vs Bangladesh on 19 September 1980

== Competition records ==
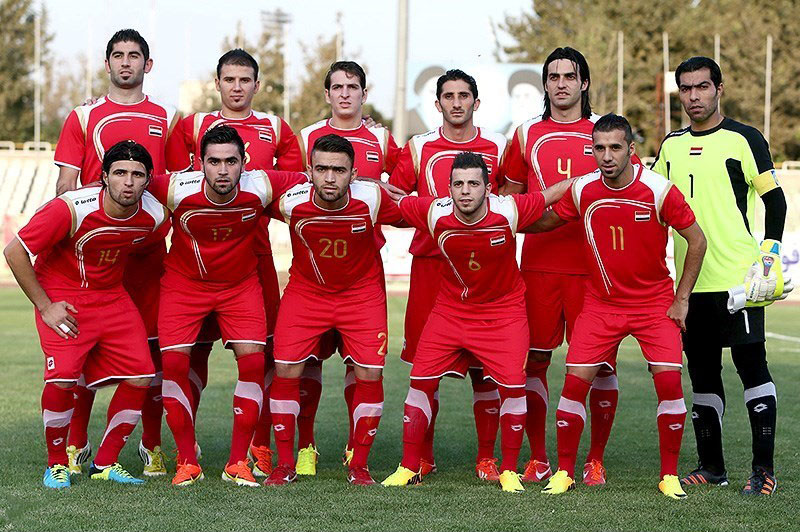
Syria national football team in Tehran – 2015 AFC Asian Cup qualification.

Overview
Event	1st place	2nd place	3rd place	4th place
World Cup	0	0	0	0
Asian Cup	0	0	0	0
WAFF Championship	1	2	0	1
FIFA Arab Cup	0	3	0	1
Arab Games	1	2	1	1
West Asian Games	0	2	1	0
Mediterranean Games	1	0	1	1

=== FIFA World Cup ===
FIFA World Cup record								Qualification record					
Year	Round	Pld	W	D*	L	GF	GA	Pld	W	D	L	GF	GA
(Uruguay) 1930	Did not enter							Did not enter					
(Italy) 1934	Did not enter							Did not enter					
(France) 1938	Did not enter							Did not enter					
(Brazil) 1950	Withdrew							1	0	0	1	0	7
(Switzerland) 1954	Did not enter							Did not enter					
(Sweden) 1958	Did not qualify							2	0	1	1	1	2
(Chile) 1962	Withdrew							Withdrew					
(England) 1966	Withdrew							Withdrew					
(Mexico) 1970	Did not enter							Did not enter					
(West Germany) 1974	Did not qualify							6	3	1	2	6	6
(Argentina) 1978	Withdrew							4	1	0	3	2	6
(Spain) 1982	Did not qualify							4	0	0	4	2	7
(Mexico) 1986	Did not qualify							8	4	3	1	8	4
(Italy) 1990	Did not qualify							4	2	1	1	7	5
(United States) 1994	Did not qualify							6	3	3	0	14	4
(France) 1998	Did not qualify							5	2	1	2	27	5
(South Korea) (Japan) 2002	Did not qualify							6	4	1	1	40	6
(Germany) 2006	Did not qualify							6	2	2	2	7	7
(South Africa) 2010	Did not qualify							10	6	2	2	23	10
(Brazil) 2014	Disqualified							2	0	0	2	0	6
(Russia) 2018	Did not qualify							20	9	5	6	36	22
(Qatar) 2022	Did not qualify							18	8	3	7	31	23
(Canada) (Mexico) (United States) 2026	Did not qualify							6	2	1	3	9	12
(Morocco) (Portugal) (Spain) 2030	To be determined							To be determined					
(Saudi Arabia) 2034	To be determined							To be determined					
Total	0/20	–	–	–	–	–	–	108	46	24	38	214	132

*Denotes draws include knockout matches decided via penalty shoot-out.

=== AFC Asian Cup ===
Main article: Syria at the AFC Asian Cup

AFC Asian Cup record								Qualification record					
Year	Round	Pld	W	D*	L	GF	GA	Pld	W	D	L	GF	GA
(Hong Kong) 1956	Not an AFC member							Not an AFC member					
(South Korea) 1960	Not an AFC member							Not an AFC member					
(Israel) 1964	Not an AFC member							Not an AFC member					
(Iran) 1968	Not an AFC member							Not an AFC member					
(Thailand) 1972	Did not qualify							3	0	2	1	4	5
(Iran) 1976	Withdrew							Withdrew					
(Kuwait) 1980	Group stage	4	2	1	1	3	2	3	2	1	0	2	0
(Singapore) 1984	Group stage	4	1	1	2	3	5	6	3	0	3	9	9
(Qatar) 1988	Group stage	4	2	0	2	2	5	4	3	1	0	8	2
(Japan) 1992	Did not qualify							2	1	0	1	3	4
(United Arab Emirates) 1996	Group stage	3	1	0	2	3	6	4	3	0	1	6	2
(Lebanon) 2000	Did not qualify							6	4	1	1	11	3
(China) 2004	Did not qualify							6	2	1	3	16	10
(Indonesia) (Malaysia) (Thailand) (Vietnam) 2007	Did not qualify							6	2	2	2	10	6
(Qatar) 2011	Group stage	3	1	0	2	4	5	6	4	2	0	10	2
(Australia) 2015	Did not qualify							6	1	1	4	7	7
(United Arab Emirates) 2019	Group stage	3	0	1	2	2	5	8	6	0	2	26	11
(Qatar) 2023	Round of 16	4	1	2	1	2	2	8	7	0	1	22	7
(Saudi Arabia) 2027	To be determined							6	2	1	3	9	12
Total	Round of 16	25	8	5	12	19	30	74	40	12	22	143	80

*Denotes draws include knockout matches decided via penalty shoot-out.

AFC Asian Cup history
Year	Round	Score	Result
1980
1980	Round 1	Syria 0–0 Iran	Draw
1980	Round 1	Syria 1–0 Bangladesh	Win
1980	Round 1	Syria 1–2 North Korea	Loss
1980	Round 1	Syria 1–0 China	Win
1984
1984	Round 1	Syria 1–1 Qatar	Draw
1984	Round 1	Syria 0–1 Saudi Arabia	Loss
1984	Round 1	Syria 1–0 South Korea	Win
1984	Round 1	Syria 1–3 Kuwait	Loss
1988
1988	Round 1	Syria 0–2 Saudi Arabia	Loss
1988	Round 1	Syria 0–3 China	Loss
1988	Round 1	Syria 1–0 Kuwait	Win
1988	Round 1	Syria 1–0 Bahrain	Win
1996
1996	Round 1	Syria 1–2 Japan	Loss
1996	Round 1	Syria 0–3 China	Loss
1996	Round 1	Syria 2–1 Uzbekistan	Win
2011
2011	Round 1	Syria 2–1 Saudi Arabia	Win
2011	Round 1	Syria 1–2 Japan	Loss
2011	Round 1	Syria 1–2 Jordan	Loss
2019
2019	Round 1	Syria 0–0 Palestine	Draw
2019	Round 1	Syria 0–2 Jordan	Loss
2019	Round 1	Syria 2–3 Australia	Loss
2023
2023	Round 1	Syria 0–0 Uzbekistan	Draw
2023	Round 1	Syria 0–1 Australia	Loss
2023	Round 1	Syria 1–0 India	Win
2023	Round 1	Syria 1–0 Iran	Draw

=== Olympic Games ===
Olympic Games record								Olympic Games qualification record					
Year	Result	Pld	W	D*	L	GF	GA	Pld	W	D*	L	GF	GA
(France) 1900 to 1968 (Mexico)	Did not enter												
(West Germany) 1972	Did not qualify							2	0	1	1	0	1
(Canada) 1976	Did not enter												
(Soviet Union) 1980	Round 1	3	0	1	2	0	8	4	2	0	2	3	1
(United States) 1984	Did not qualify							6	2	1	3	6	10
(South Korea) 1988	Did not qualify							2	0	0	2	0	5
(Spain) 1992 to present	See Syria national under-23 team							See Syria national under-23 team					
Total	0 Titles	3	0	1	2	0	8	14	4	2	8	9	17

*Denotes draws include knockout matches decided via penalty shoot-out.

=== WAFF Championship ===

2012 WAFF Championship Final starting lineup on 20 December 2012, in Kuwait City (Al-Sadaqua Walsalam Stadium).

WAFF Championship record
Year	Round	Pld	W	D*	L	GF	GA
(Jordan) 2000	Runners-up	5	2	1	2	5	2
(Syria) 2002	Fourth place	4	1	1	2	5	6
(Iran) 2004	Runners-up	4	1	1	2	6	13
(Jordan) 2007	Semi-finals	3	2	0	1	2	3
(Iran) 2008	Semi-finals	3	1	1	1	2	3
(Jordan) 2010	Group stage	2	0	1	1	2	3
(Kuwait) 2012	Champions	4	2	2	0	5	3
(Qatar) 2014	Withdrew						
(Iraq) 2019	Group stage	4	0	2	2	5	7
(United Arab Emirates) 2023	Qualified						
Total	1 Title	29	9	9	11	32	40

*Denotes draws include knockout matches decided via penalty shoot-out.

=== FIFA Arab Cup ===
FIFA Arab Cup record
Year	Round	Pld	W	D*	L	GF	GA
(Lebanon) 1963	Runners-up	4	3	0	1	9	4
(Kuwait) 1964	Did not enter						
(Iraq) 1966	Runners-up	5	3	1	1	9	4
(Saudi Arabia) 1985	Did not enter						
(Jordan) 1988	Runners-up	6	2	2	2	5	5
(Syria) 1992	Fourth place	4	0	3	1	2	3
(Qatar) 1998	Group stage	2	0	0	2	1	6
(Kuwait) 2002	Group stage	4	2	0	2	8	6
(Saudi Arabia) 2012	Did not enter						
(Qatar) 2021	Group stage	3	1	0	2	4	4
(Qatar) 2025	Quarter finals	4	1	2	1	2	2
Total	0 Titles	32	12	8	12	40	34

*Denotes draws include knockout matches decided via penalty shoot-out.

=== Arab Games ===
Pan Arab Games record
Year	Round	Pld	W	D*	L	GF	GA
(Egypt) 1953	Runners-up	3	1	1	1	3	5
(Lebanon) 1957	Champions	5	2	2	1	12	6
(Morocco) 1961	Did not enter						
(Egypt) 1965	Group stage	4	2	0	2	20	8
(Syria) 1976	Third place	6	3	1	2	6	4
(Morocco) 1985	Group stage	2	0	0	2	0	4
(Syria) 1992	Fourth place	4	0	3	1	2	3
(Lebanon) 1997	Runners-up	5	4	0	1	9	5
(Jordan) 1999	Group stage	4	0	4	0	5	5
(Egypt) 2007	Did not enter						
(Qatar) 2011	Withdrew						
(Algeria) 2023	See Syria national under-23 team						
Total	1 Title	33	12	11	10	57	40

*Denotes draws include knockout matches decided via penalty shoot-out.

=== Mediterranean Games ===
Mediterranean Games record
Year	Round	Pld	W	D	L	GF	GA
(Egypt) 1951	Third place	2	0	0	2	0	12
(Spain) 1955	Fourth place	3	0	0	3	0	10
(Lebanon) 1959	Did not enter						
(Italy) 1963	Group stage	3	0	0	3	1	10
(Tunisia) 1967	Did not enter						
(Turkey) 1971	Group stage	3	0	0	3	1	4
(Algeria) 1975	Did not enter						
(Socialist Federal Republic of Yugoslavia) 1979	Did not enter						
(Morocco) 1983	Group stage	2	0	0	2	0	2
(Syria) 1987	Champions	5	4	1	0	13	3
(Italy) 1991 to present	See Syria national under-20 team						
Total	1 Title	18	4	1	13	15	41

=== Asian Games ===
Asian Games record
Year	Round	Pld	W	D*	L	GF	GA
(India) 1951	Did not enter						
(Philippines) 1954	Did not enter						
(Japan) 1958	Did not enter						
(Indonesia) 1962	Did not enter						
(Thailand) 1966	Did not enter						
(Thailand) 1970	Did not enter						
(Iran) 1974	Did not enter						
(Thailand) 1978	Did not enter						
(India) 1982	Group stage	3	0	2	1	3	5
(South Korea) 1986	Did not enter						
(China) 1990	Did not enter						
(Japan) 1994	Did not enter						
(Thailand) 1998	Did not enter						
(South Korea) 2002 to present	See Syria national under-23 team						
Total	0 Titles	3	0	1	2	3	5

*Denotes draws include knockout matches decided via penalty shoot-out.

=== West Asian Games ===
West Asian Games record
Year	Round	Pld	W	D*	L	GF	GA
(Iran) 1997	Runners-up						
(Kuwait) 2002	Third place	4	1	3	0	5	4
(Qatar) 2005	Runners-up	4	1	3	0	7	5
Total	0 Titles	8	2	6	0	12	9

*Denotes draws include knockout matches decided via penalty shoot-out.

== Results by Event ==
As of 01 Oct 2026 after match against Uzbekistan

Event	Pld	W	D	L	GF	GA	GD
Friendly matches	246	73	67	106	296	351	–55
World Cup qualification	92	33	24	35	166	114	+52
Asian Cup	25	8	5	12	19	30	11
Asian Cup qualifiers	73	44	11	18	155	69	+86
WAFF Championship	29	9	9	11	32	40	8
Arab Cup	35	16	9	10	49	32	+ 17
Palestine Cup	16	7	1	8	25	28	3
Arab Games	26	9	8	9	44	35	+ 9
Asian Games	3	0	2	1	3	5	− 2
West Asian Games	3	1	2	0	7	5	+ 2
Mediterranean Games	9	2	0	7	10	22	12
Total	556	202	138	217	806	731	+75

== Head-to-head record ==
The list shown below shows the Syria national football team all-time international record against opposing nations.

Positive Record Neutral Record Negative Record

As of 1 October 2026 after match against Uzbekistan

All friendly and international matches have been approved, except for Olympic matches. A-level matches

Syria national football team head-to-head records
Opponent	Played	Win	Draws	Losse	GF	GA	GD	Confederation
Afghanistan	5	5	0	0	17	3	+14	AFC
Algeria	6	1	2	3	4	7	−3	CAF
Australia	4	0	1	3	4	7	−3	AFC
Bahrain	25	12	7	6	29	24	+5	AFC
Bangladesh	3	3	0	0	5	1	+4	AFC
Belarus	2	0	0	2	1	5	−4	UEFA
Cambodia	3	3	0	0	17	1	+16	AFC
China	15	5	2	8	14	29	−15	AFC
Chinese Taipei	4	4	0	0	17	1	+16	AFC
Cyprus	1	0	0	1	0	1	−1	UEFA
Egypt	11	2	2	7	7	23	−16	CAF
Greece	2	0	0	2	0	12	−12	UEFA
Guam	2	2	0	0	7	0	+7	AFC
Haiti	1	1	0	0	2	1	+1	CONCACAF
Hong Kong	1	1	0	0	2	0	+2	AFC
India	8	4	2	2	11	7	+4	AFC
Indonesia	5	4	0	1	15	3	+12	AFC
Iran	30	1	12	17	16	52	−36	AFC
Iraq	33	5	11	17	25	46	−21	AFC
Japan	13	0	2	11	9	37	−28	AFC
Jordan	44	14	15	15	48	45	+3	AFC
Kazakhstan	4	3	1	0	8	1	+7	UEFA
Kuwait	35	11	10	14	41	53	−12	AFC
Kyrgyzstan	7	2	2	3	10	8	+2	AFC
Laos	2	2	0	0	20	0	+20	AFC
Lebanon	25	15	5	5	50	28	+22	AFC
Libya	10	3	3	4	13	17	−4	AFC
Malaysia	6	2	2	2	12	14	-2	AFC
Maldives	7	6	0	1	39	4	+35	AFC
Mauritania	3	2	0	1	4	2	+2	CAF
Morocco	7	0	3	4	2	8	−6	CAF
Mauritius	1	1	0	0	2	0	+2	CAF
Myanmar	4	3	1	0	16	2	+14	AFC
Nepal	2	2	0	0	5	0	+5	AFC
Nigeria	1	0	0	1	0	1	−1	CAF
North Korea	11	4	4	3	18	14	+4	AFC
Oman	26	9	8	9	39	28	+11	AFC
Pakistan	2	2	0	0	7	0	+7	AFC
Palestine	17	8	6	2	26	14	+12	AFC
Philippines	5	5	0	0	25	3	+22	AFC
Qatar	13	4	4	5	19	19	0	AFC
Russia	1	0	0	1	0	4	−4	UEFA
San Marino	1	1	0	0	3	0	+3	UEFA
Saudi Arabia	27	2	9	16	22	49	−26	AFC
Sierra Leone	1	1	0	0	6	0	+6	CAF
Singapore	6	4	0	2	11	7	+4	AFC
South Korea	10	1	3	6	5	12	−7	AFC
South Sudan	1	1	0	0	2	0	+2	CAF
South Yemen^{a}	2	1	0	1	2	2	0	AFC
Soviet Union^{a}	1	0	0	1	0	2	−2	UEFA
Sri Lanka	3	3	0	0	17	0	+17	AFC
Sudan	10	4	2	4	10	10	0	CAF
Sweden	1	0	1	0	1	1	0	UEFA
Tajikistan	9	5	1	3	8	11	−3	AFC
Thailand	7	1	2	4	11	15	−4	AFC
Tunisia	12	6	1	5	15	16	−1	CAF
Turkey	1	0	0	1	0	7	−7	UEFA
Turkmenistan	3	1	1	1	6	5	+1	AFC
United Arab Emirates	25	3	8	14	19	40	−21	AFC
Uzbekistan	8	3	2	3	6	9	–3	AFC
Venezuela	2	0	0	2	2	6	−4	CONMEBOL
Vietnam	4	1	1	2	1	3	−2	AFC
Yemen^{b}	14	11	1	2	42	10	+32	AFC
Zimbabwe	1	1	0	0	6	0	+6	CAF
Total	556	201	138	217	801	729	+72	
Last match updated was against (Jordan) Uzbekistan on 1 October 2026.

(a) Denotes defunct national football team.
(b) Including North Yemen

== Unofficial matches ==
This is a list of the Syria national football team results from 1939 to the present day that, for various reasons, are not accorded the status of official International A Matches.

=== 1930s ===
29 October 1939 Non-FIFA friendly	Beirut XI	4–5	Damascus XI	Beirut, Lebanon
	Majdalani; Sidani; Nassar			Stadium: Sika Stadium; Referee: Khalil Hilmi (Lebanon)

1939 Non-FIFA friendly	Beirut XI	2–1	Damascus XI	Beirut, Lebanon

14 November 1939 Non-FIFA friendly	Damascus XI	1–6	Beirut XI	Damascus, Syria
			Majdalani; Nassar; Jumaa	Stadium: Barada Stadium; Referee: Adham Machnouk (Syria)

=== 1940s ===
1947 Non-FIFA friendly	Beirut XI	5–1	Damascus XI	Beirut, Lebanon

1947 Non-FIFA friendly	Damascus XI	1–3	Beirut XI	Damascus, Syria
			Abou Nader

=== 1950s ===
1952 Non-FIFA friendly	Beirut XI	0–1	Damascus XI	Beirut, Lebanon

1952 Non-FIFA friendly	Damascus XI	8–2	Beirut XI	Damascus, Syria

1953 Non-FIFA friendly	Damascus XI	1–0	Beirut XI	Damascus, Syria

1953 Non-FIFA friendly	Beirut XI	2–2	Damascus XI	Beirut, Lebanon

1954 Non-FIFA friendly	Beirut XI	3–1	Damascus XI	Beirut, Lebanon

1954 Non-FIFA friendly	Damascus XI	5–1	Beirut XI	Damascus, Syria

1954 1954 Arab Military Championship	Lebanon	2–5	Syria	Damascus, Syria
	Chabarian; Altonian

1956 Non-FIFA friendly	Beirut XI	2–0	Damascus XI	Beirut, Lebanon

1956 Non-FIFA friendly	Damascus XI	1–2	Beirut XI	Damascus, Syria

=== 1960s ===
16 June 1963 Non-FIFA friendly	Beirut XI	2–1	Damascus XI	Beirut, Lebanon
				Stadium: Camille Chamoun Sports City Stadium

21 June 1963 Non-FIFA friendly	Damascus XI	0–0	Beirut XI	Damascus, Syria

=== 2020s ===
13 November 2022 Unofficial Friendly	Syria	0–1	Algeria A'	Sharjah, UAE
			Mrezigue 71'	Stadium: Sharjah Stadium

5 January 2024 Unofficial Friendly	Syria	1–1	Kyrgyzstan	Dubai, United Arab Emirates
18:30 UTC+4	Kurdaghli (red card) 59'; Hesar 71'	Report	Akmatov 48'	Stadium: Maktoum bin Rashid Al Maktoum Stadium

15 December 2024 Unofficial Friendly	Kuwait	Cancelled	Syria	Doha, Qatar
