= 1996 AFC Asian Cup qualification =

Tournament details
- Dates: 24 January 1996 – 11 August 1996
- Teams: 33 (from 1 confederation)

Tournament statistics
- Matches played: 62
- Goals scored: 275 (4.44 per match)
- Top scorer: (Iran) Ali Daei (12 goals)

Qualification for 1996 AFC Asian Cup took place between 24 January and 13 August 1996. In total, 33 teams competed for 10 places at the finals. United Arab Emirates and Japan qualified automatically as holders and hosts respectively.

Following the dissolution of the Soviet Union, the competition marked the first appearance of five post-Soviet states in the AFC Asian Cup as Kazakhstan, Kyrgyzstan, Tajikistan, Turkmenistan and Uzbekistan all made their debuts in the qualifying stages.

After 275 goals were scored across 62 matches, China, Indonesia, Iran, Iraq, Kuwait, Saudi Arabia, South Korea, Syria, Thailand and Uzbekistan qualified for the 1996 AFC Asian Cup. Both Indonesia and Uzbekistan qualified for the first time.

== Background ==
The inaugural AFC Asian Cup was held in Hong Kong in 1956. Japan were the defending champions after defeating Saudi Arabia 1–0 in the final of the previous edition as hosts in 1992. Iran were the most successful team in the history of the competition, having won the title three times previously.

Iran and South Korea had qualified for the finals a record seven times. Iran had qualified for each of the last seven tournaments consecutively. China and the United Arab Emirates had the next longest ongoing consecutive qualification streaks at five and four, respectively. Indonesia were among the teams who had never qualified before.

Following the Revolutions of 1989, the Soviet Union was dissolved and ceased to exist on 26 December 1991. As a result, neither Kazakhstan, Kyrgyzstan, Tajikistan, Turkmenistan nor Uzbekistan had entered the AFC Asian Cup before.

== Format ==
In total, 35 teams were included in the qualification draw. They were drawn into 10 round robin groups – five of four teams and five of three teams. Groups one, two, four and six were played as single round robin tournamnts with all matches played in a single host city. Groups three and five were played as double round robin tournaments with matches split evenly between two host cities. Groups seven, eight, nine and 10 were also played as double round robin tournaments but matches were played on a home-and-away basis. The winner of each of the 10 groups would qualify for the 1996 AFC Asian Cup.

== Group 1 ==
Matches were played at the Thống Nhất Stadium in Ho Chi Minh City, Vietnam. South Korea qualified for the 1996 AFC Asian Cup.

=== Table ===
Pos	Team	Pld	W	D	L	GF	GA	GD	Pts	Qualification
1	South Korea	3	3	0	0	17	0	+17	9	Qualification to the 1996 AFC Asian Cup
2	Vietnam	3	2	0	1	13	5	+8	6	
3	Chinese Taipei	3	1	0	2	10	10	0	3	
4	Guam	3	0	0	3	2	27	−25	0	

=== Matches ===
4 August 1996
17:00

Vietnam	4–1	Chinese Taipei
Le Huynh Duc 16', 56', 64'; Nguyen Hong Son 75'		Huang Che-ming 23'

Thống Nhất Stadium, Ho Chi Minh City

5 August 1996
17:00

South Korea	9–0	Guam
Park Tae-ha 12', 14', 40'; Kim Hyun-seok 25', 36', 55'; Kim Do-hoon 19'; Seo Hyo-won 52'; Choi Moon-sik 85'

Thống Nhất Stadium, Ho Chi Minh City
Referee: Kyaw U Kyaw (Myanmar)

7 August 1996
17:00

Vietnam	9–0	Guam
Chu Van Mui 28', 44'; Dang Phuong Nam 32', 52', 77'; Nguyen Chi Bao 56', 65'; Nguyen Ni Cuong 60'; Le Huynh Duc 72'

Thống Nhất Stadium, Ho Chi Minh City
Attendance: 192
Referee: Kyaw U Kyaw (Myanmar)

8 August 1996
17:00

South Korea	4–0	Chinese Taipei
Hong Myung-bo 9'; Kim Do-hoon 19'; Park Tae-ha 48', 70'

Thống Nhất Stadium, Ho Chi Minh City
Referee: Inayath Ulla Khan (India)

10 August 1996
17:00

Guam	2–9	Chinese Taipei
Cunliffe 73'; Marinos 83'		Chu Wai Fung 1', 13', 14'; Chen Fa Liang 16', 30'; Ka Fong Teng 57', 59'; Chai Ka Seng 81'; Tun Fang 90+1'

Thống Nhất Stadium, Ho Chi Minh City

11 August 1996
17:00

Vietnam	0–4	South Korea
		Shin Tae-yong 1'; Roh Sang-rae 8'; Park Tae-ha 17'; Seo Hyo-won 83'

Thống Nhất Stadium, Ho Chi Minh City
Referee: Chalach Piromya (Thailand)

== Group 2 ==
Matches were played at the Mong Kok Stadium and the Hong Kong Stadium in Hong Kong. China qualified for the 1996 AFC Asian Cup.

=== Table ===
Pos	Team	Pld	W	D	L	GF	GA	GD	Pts	Qualification
1	China	3	3	0	0	16	1	+15	9	Qualification to the 1996 AFC Asian Cup
2	Hong Kong	3	2	0	1	12	3	+9	6	
3	Macau	3	1	0	2	7	12	−5	3	
4	Philippines	3	0	0	3	1	20	−19	0	

=== Matches ===
30 January 1996

Hong Kong	8–0	Philippines
Chan Tsi-Kong 3', 80'; Bredbury 39', 42'; Lee Kin Wo 59'; Wai Kwai-Lung 82', 83'; Leslie Santos 90'

Mong Kok Stadium, Kowloon
Referee: Anh Bong-ki (South Korea)
30 January 1996

China	7–1	Macau
Peng Weiguo 28' (pen.), 45'; Su Maozhen 44'; Li Bing 48', 66', 89'; Hao Haidong 76'		Ung Siu-Cheong 42'

Mong Kok Stadium, Kowloon
Referee: Sophon Mhaboon (Thailand)

1 February 1996

Philippines	0–7	China
		Hao Haidong 17', 58', 63'; Ma Mingyu 60'; Su Maozhen 77', 87'; Gao Feng 83'

Mong Kok Stadium, Kowloon
Referee: Sophon Mhaboon (Thailand)
1 February 1996

Hong Kong	4–1	Macau
Au Wai Lun 26'; Bredbury 72', 75' (pen.), 77'		José Martins 70'

Mong Kok Stadium, Kowloon
Referee: Yoshimi Ogawa (Japan)

4 February 1996

Macau	5–1	Philippines
Paulo 2'; José Martins 63', 52'; Cho Chi-Man 64'; Pinto 82'		Kalalang 63'

Mong Kok Stadium, Kowloon
Referee: Anh Bong-ki (South Korea)
4 February 1996

Hong Kong	0–2	China
		Fan Zhiyi 51'; Wei Qun 89'

Mong Kok Stadium, Kowloon
Referee: Yoshimi Ogawa (Japan)

== Group 3 ==
Matches were played in Bangkok, Thailand and at the National Stadium in Singapore. Thailand qualified for the 1996 AFC Asian Cup.

=== Table ===
Pos	Team	Pld	W	D	L	GF	GA	GD	Pts	Qualification
1	Thailand	6	4	2	0	31	5	+26	14	Qualification to the 1996 AFC Asian Cup
2	Singapore	6	3	3	0	16	7	+9	12	
3	Myanmar	6	2	1	3	11	20	−9	7	
4	Maldives	6	0	0	6	4	30	−26	0	

=== Matches ===
27 June 1996

Thailand	8–0	Maldives
Sritrong-in 25', 57', 85'; Senamuang 31', 78'; Chalermsan 17'; Thaveechalermdit 68'; Sripramote 87'

Bangkok
27 June 1996

Myanmar	0–4	Singapore
		Selvaraj 42'; Ali Rafi 62', 87'; Dasuki 73'

Bangkok

29 June 1996

Thailand	5–1	Myanmar
Damrong-ongtrakul 46'; Tonhongsa 48'; Sawor 67'; Chalermsan 86'; Senamuang 89'		Maung Maung Oo 23'

Bangkok
29 June 1996

Maldives	0–2	Singapore
		Selvaraj 42'; Dasuki 79'

Bangkok

1 July 1996

Thailand	1–1	Singapore
Thaveecharlermdit 55'		Lim Tong Hai 60'

Bangkok
1 July 1996

Myanmar	3–1	Maldives
Phan Toe Aung 32'; Myo Hlaing Win 39'; Kyaw Min 40'		Saeed 76' (pen.)

Bangkok

4 July 1996

Maldives	0–8	Thailand
		Tonhongsa 5'; Sripramote 10', 22', 38', 61'; Srimaka 44'; Polsak 54'; Chalermsan 70'

National Stadium, Singapore
4 July 1996

Singapore	2–2	Myanmar
Alo Rafi 18', 24'		Myo Hlaing Win 69'; Kyaw Min 88'

National Stadium, Singapore

7 July 1996

Myanmar	1–7	Thailand
Zaw Lay Aung 60'		Senamuang 5', 54'; Sripramote 7', 85'; Jaturapattarapong 20', 24'; Sritrong-in 79'

National Stadium, Singapore
7 July 1996

Singapore	5–2	Maldives
Selvaraj 30'; Ta Teng Chuan 33', 61', 77'; Lim Tong Hai 90'		Saeed 6'; Ismail 58'

National Stadium, Singapore

9 July 1996

Maldives	1–4	Myanmar
Rasheed 45' (pen.)		Myo Hlaing Win 10', 75', 89'; Maung Maung Oo 60'

National Stadium, Singapore
9 July 1996

Singapore	2–2	Thailand
Selvaraj 51', 65'		Sritrong-In 69'; Senamuang 71'

National Stadium, Singapore

== Group 4 ==
Matches were played at the Shah Alam Stadium in Shah Alam, Malaysia. Indonesia qualified for the 1996 AFC Asian Cup.

=== Table ===
Pos	Team	Pld	W	D	L	GF	GA	GD	Pts	Qualification
1	Indonesia	2	1	1	0	7	1	+6	4	Qualification to the 1996 AFC Asian Cup
2	Malaysia	2	1	1	0	5	2	+3	4	
3	India	2	0	0	2	3	12	−9	0	

=== Matches ===
2 March 1996
21:45

Malaysia	0–0	Indonesia

Shah Alam Stadium, Shah Alam

4 March 1996
21:45

Indonesia	7–1	India
Indriyanto 12', 74'; Rochy 18', 52'; Ansyari 42', 49'; Peri 77'		T. Kumar 11'

Shah Alam Stadium, Shah Alam

6 March 1996
21:45

Malaysia	5–2	India
Zainal Abidin 12', 57'; Dollah Salleh 21' (pen.), 54'; Abu Bakar 71'		Carlton Chapman 46'; Bhaichung Bhutia 78'

Shah Alam Stadium, Shah Alam

== Group 5 ==
Matches were played at the Azadi Stadium in Tehran, Iran and the Sultan Qaboos Sports Complex in Muscat, Oman. Iran qualified for the 1996 AFC Asian Cup.

=== Table ===
Pos	Team	Pld	W	D	L	GF	GA	GD	Pts	Qualification
1	Iran	6	6	0	0	27	1	+26	18	Qualification to the 1996 AFC Asian Cup
2	Oman	6	4	0	2	23	5	+18	12	
3	Sri Lanka	6	2	0	4	5	25	−20	6	
4	Nepal	6	0	0	6	2	26	−24	0	

=== Matches ===
10 June 1996

Oman	3–0	Sri Lanka
Al-Mazrooei 29'; D. Al-Mukhaini 32'; A. Al-Mukhaini 68'

Azadi Stadium, Tehran
10 June 1996

Iran	8–0	Nepal
Bagheri 10' (pen.), 60'; Daei 14', 36', 84', 87'; Garousi 51'; Hakimzadeh 73'

Azadi Stadium, Tehran
Attendance: 35,000
Referee: Dirar Al-Tamimi (Jordan)

12 June 1996

Oman	7–0	Nepal
Al-Mazrooei 22'; Wahaibi 49', 76'; Al-Moamari 66', 77'; Mubarak 75', 86'

Azadi Stadium, Tehran
12 June 1996

Iran	7–0	Sri Lanka
Daei 30', 64', 65', 70', 77'; Bagheri 62'; Garousi 69'

Azadi Stadium, Tehran
Attendance: 20,000
Referee: Selearajen Subramaniam (Malaysia)

14 June 1996

Sri Lanka	3–1	Nepal
Roshan 20', 33', 85'		Shrestha 74'

Azadi Stadium, Tehran
14 June 1996

Iran	2–0	Oman
Daei 5'; Estili 84'

Azadi Stadium, Tehran
Attendance: 100,000
Referee: Dirar Al-Tamimi (Jordan)

17 June 1996

Iran	4–0	Sri Lanka
Bagheri 17', 54', 68'; Mansourian 78'

Sultan Qaboos Sports Complex, Muscat
Attendance: 2,000
Referee: Abdul Al-Khamesy (Yemen)
17 June 1996

Oman	2–1	Nepal
Al-Habsi 40', 86'		Khadka 87'

Sultan Qaboos Sports Complex, Muscat

19 June 1996
16:30

Iran	4–0	Nepal
Daei 27'; Bagheri 38', 44' (pen.); Shahroudi 66'

Sultan Qaboos Sports Complex, Muscat
Attendance: 2,000
Referee: Abdulrahman Al-Zeid (Saudi Arabia)
19 June 1996
18:45

Oman	10–0	Sri Lanka
Shabab 7', 18', 64'; Al-Habsi 12', 73'; Sultan 20'; Khalifa 35'; Al-Siyabi 58'; Salim 75', 82'

Sultan Qaboos Sports Complex, Muscat

21 June 1996

Nepal	0–2	Sri Lanka
		Steinwall 47'; Roshan 48'

Sultan Qaboos Sports Complex, Muscat
21 June 1996

Oman	1–2	Iran
Al-Habsi 60' (pen.)		Daei 23'; Bagheri 88' (pen.)

Sultan Qaboos Sports Complex, Muscat
Attendance: 5,000
Referee: Russamee Jindamai (Thailand)

== Group 6 ==
Matches were played at the Azadi Stadium in Tehran, Iran and the Amman International Stadium in Amman, Jordan. Bangladesh withdrew. Iraq qualified for the 1996 AFC Asian Cup.

=== Table ===
Pos	Team	Pld	W	D	L	GF	GA	GD	Pts	Qualification
1	Iraq	2	2	0	0	4	0	+4	6	Qualification to the 1996 AFC Asian Cup
2	Jordan	2	1	0	1	4	1	+3	3	
3	Pakistan	2	0	0	2	0	7	−7	0	
4	Bangladesh	0	0	0	0	0	0	0	0	Withdrew

=== Matches ===
9 August 1996

Jordan	4–0	Pakistan
Tadrus 35', 83'; Al-Sheyab 54'; Abdul-Munam 87'

Amman International Stadium, Amman

11 August 1996

Pakistan	0–3	Iraq
		Abbas 42'; Fawzi 65'; Shenaishil 67'

Amman International Stadium, Amman

13 August 1996

Jordan	0–1	Iraq
		Hashim 60'

Amman International Stadium, Amman

== Group 7 ==
Matches were played on a home-and-away basis. Syria qualified for the 1996 AFC Asian Cup.

=== Table ===
Pos	Team	Pld	W	D	L	GF	GA	GD	Pts	Qualification
1	Syria	4	3	0	1	6	2	+4	9	Qualification to the 1996 AFC Asian Cup
2	Qatar	4	2	0	2	5	4	+1	6	
3	Kazakhstan	4	1	0	3	1	6	−5	3	

=== Matches ===
14 June 1996

Kazakhstan	1–0	Qatar
Nizovtsev 7'

Central Stadium, Almaty
Attendance: 6,000
Referee: Pirom Un-Prasert (Thailand)

21 June 1996

Syria	2–0	Kazakhstan
Taleb 21'; M. Sheikh-Dib 34'

Abbasiyyin Stadium, Damascus
Attendance: 20,000
Referee: Fahed Al-Damisi (Jordan)

28 June 1996

Qatar	1–0	Syria
Al-Enazi 35'

Khalifa Stadium, Doha
Referee: Ali Bujsaim (UAE)

5 July 1996

Qatar	3–0	Kazakhstan
Al-Obaidly 5'; Soufi 21'; Al-Enazi 43'

Khalifa Stadium, Doha
Referee: Omer Al-Mehannah(Saudi Arabia)

12 July 1996

Kazakhstan	0–1	Syria
		Al Boushi 9'

Central Stadium, Almaty
Attendance: 5,000
Referee: Nik Ahmad Yaakub(Malaysia)

19 July 1996

Syria	3–1	Qatar
Helou 17'; M. Sheikh-Dib 48'; Khalifa 76' (pen.)		Al-Enazi 58'

Abbasiyyin Stadium, Damascus
Attendance: 20,000
Referee: Hossein Askari (Iran)

== Group 8 ==
Matches were played on a home-and-away basis. After the withdrawal of Bahrain, the group effectively became a two-legged tie. In the event of a tie on aggregate, sudden death extra time would be played. Uzbekistan qualified for the 1996 AFC Asian Cup.

=== Table ===
Pos	Team	Pld	W	D	L	GF	GA	GD	Pts	Qualification
1	Uzbekistan	2	1	0	1	5	4	+1	3	Qualification to the 1996 AFC Asian Cup
2	Tajikistan	2	1	0	1	4	5	−1	3	
3	Bahrain	0	0	0	0	0	0	0	0	Withdrew

=== Matches ===
8 May 1996

Tajikistan	4–0	Uzbekistan
Fuzaylov 3' (pen.); Ashurmamadov 65', 67'; Avakov 87'

Pamir Stadium, Dushanbe
Attendance: 20,000
Referee: Aleksandr Koulakov (Kazakhstan)

19 June 1996

Uzbekistan	5–0 (a.s.d.e.t.)	Tajikistan
Kasymov 4' (pen.), 33' (pen.); Andreyev 8'; Shkvyrin 72'; Musabayev 95'

Pakhtakor Stadium, Tashkent
Attendance: 15,000
Referee: Eldar Ramazanov (Turkmenistan)

== Group 9 ==
Matches were played at the King Fahd International Stadium in Riyadh, Saudi Arabia. Saudi Arabia qualified for the 1996 AFC Asian Cup.

=== Table ===
Pos	Team	Pld	W	D	L	GF	GA	GD	Pts	Qualification
1	Saudi Arabia	4	4	0	0	10	0	+10	12	Qualification to the 1996 AFC Asian Cup
2	Kyrgyzstan	4	1	0	3	3	7	−4	3	
3	Yemen	4	1	0	3	2	8	−6	3	

=== Matches ===
24 January 1996

Saudi Arabia	3–0	Kyrgyzstan
Al-Thunayan 7', 38'; Amin 57' (pen.)

King Fahd International Stadium, Riyadh
Attendance: 2,000
Referee: Mohammed Kekhia (Syria)

26 January 1996

Yemen	1–0	Kyrgyzstan
Sharaf Mahfood 57'

King Fahd International Stadium, Riyadh
Attendance: 1,000
Referee: Jalal Moradi (Iran)

28 January 1996

Saudi Arabia	4–0	Yemen
Al-Thunayan 42', 53'; Falatah 59'; Al-Hamdan 66'

King Fahd International Stadium, Riyadh
Referee: Jundami Rosami (Thailand)

31 January 1996

Kyrgyzstan	0–2	Saudi Arabia
		Falatah 25'; Al-Thunayan 67'

King Fahd International Stadium, Riyadh
Attendance: 2,000
Referee: Jassim Al-Khori (Qatar)

2 February 1996

Kyrgyzstan	3–1	Yemen
Kadyrov 43'; Rybakov 50'; Khaytbaev 75'		Ben Rabah 21'

King Fahd International Stadium, Riyadh
Attendance: 1,000
Referee: Mohammed Kekhia (Syria)

4 February 1996

Yemen	0–1	Saudi Arabia
		Al-Hamdan 12'

King Fahd International Stadium, Riyadh
Referee: Jalal Moradi (Iran)

== Group 10 ==
Matches were played on a home-and-away basis. Kuwait qualified for the 1996 AFC Asian Cup.

=== Table ===
Pos	Team	Pld	W	D	L	GF	GA	GD	Pts	Qualification
1	Kuwait	4	2	2	0	9	5	+4	8	Qualification to the 1996 AFC Asian Cup
2	Lebanon	4	2	1	1	7	6	+1	7	
3	Turkmenistan	4	0	1	3	3	8	−5	1	

=== Matches ===
10 March 1996

Turkmenistan	2–2	Kuwait
Urazow 3'; Plyushchenko 8'		Haji 13'; Al-Dawod 89'

Köpetdag Stadium, Ashgabat

22 March 1996

Kuwait	2–0	Turkmenistan
Sulaiman 18'; Bekheet 68'

Kuwait City
Attendance: 10,000

12 May 1996

Lebanon	3–1	Turkmenistan
Nahza 28'; Taha 68'; Karnib 90'		Bondoyev 20'

Bourj Hammoud Stadium, Beirut
Attendance: 10,000

26 May 1996

Turkmenistan	0–1	Lebanon
		Ghazarian 33'

Nusaý Stadium, Ashgabat
Attendance: 10,000

9 June 1996

Lebanon	3–5	Kuwait
Nazha 6'; Ghazarian 10', 46'		Al-Otaybi 16'; Al-Shlimi 27'; Al-Hindi 30'; Haji 66'; Wabran 84'

Beirut
Attendance: 22,000

20 June 1996

Kuwait	0–0	Lebanon

Kuwait City
Attendance: 25,000

== Qualified teams ==
Team	Qualified as	Qualified on	Previous appearances
United Arab Emirates	Hosts	29 April 1993	4 (1980, 1984, 1988, 1992)
Japan	1992 AFC Asian Cup champions	8 November 1992	2 (1988, 1992)
South Korea	Group 1 winners	11 August 1996	7 (1956, 1960, 1964, 1972, 1980, 1984, 1988)
China	Group 2 winners	4 February 1996	5 (1976, 1980, 1984, 1988, 1992)
Thailand	Group 3 winners	9 July 1996	2 (1972, 1992)
Indonesia	Group 4 winners	4 March 1996	0 (debut)
Iran	Group 5 winners	21 June 1996	7 (1968, 1972, 1976, 1980, 1984, 1988, 1992)
Iraq	Group 6 winners	13 August 1996	2 (1972, 1976)
Syria	Group 7 winners	19 July 1996	3 (1980, 1984, 1988)
Uzbekistan	Group 8 winners	19 June 1996	0 (debut)
Saudi Arabia	Group 9 winners	2 February 1996	3 (1984, 1988, 1992)
Kuwait	Group 10 winners	20 June 1996	5 (1972, 1976, 1980, 1984, 1988)
