= Musabayev =

Musabayev or Musabaev is a Turkic masculine surname, its feminine counterpart is Musabayeva or Musabaeva. Notable people with the surname include:

- Talgat Musabayev (1951–2025), Kazakh test pilot and former cosmonaut
- Zafarjon Musabayev (born 1975), Uzbekistani footballer
