= Ali Cheikh Dib =

Syrian footballer (born 1972)

Personal information
- Date of birth: 1 September 1972 (age 54)
- Place of birth: Syria
- Position: Midfielder

Youth career
- 1985–1987: Al-Ittihad
- 1987–1988: Al-Hurriya

Senior career*
Years	Team	Apps	(Gls)
1988–1994	Al-Hurriya		
1994–1996	Proodeftiki		
1996–1999	Tishreen		
1999–2004	Al-Ittihad		
2000	→ Homenmen Beirut (loan)		
2004–2005	Al-Hurriya		
2005–2006	Al-Fotuwa		
2006–2007	Al-Hurriya		

International career
1987–2003	Syria		
- * Club domestic league appearances and goals

Ali Cheikh Dib (Arabic: علي عادل شيخ ديب) is a Syrian former footballer who played as a midfielder.

== Career ==
Cheikh Dib won the Syrian Premier League twice with Al-Hurriya in 1992 and 1994. Then, he was part of the Syria national football team which competed in the 1996 AFC Asian Cup.

== Honours ==
Individual

- Lebanese Premier League Best Goal: 2000–01
