= Zafarjon Musabayev =

Uzbekistani footballer

Zafardyon Musabayev
Personal information
- Date of birth: 15 October 1975 (age 51)
- Place of birth: Namangan, Uzbekistan
- Position: Forward

Senior career*
Years	Team	Apps	(Gls)
1991	Sokhibkor Khalkabad	-	(-)
1994–1998	Navbahor Namangan	-	(-)
1999–2003	FC Andijon	-	(-)

International career
1996	Uzbekistan	2	(1)
- * Club domestic league appearances and goals

Zafardyon Musabayev is an Uzbekistani football forward who played for Uzbekistan in the 1996 Asian Cup. He also played for Navbahor Namangan.

== Career ==
Musabayev began his career at Sokhibkor Khalkabad in the regionalized fourth-tier Soviet Second League B. In 1994, he joined Uzbekistan Super League side Navbahor Namangan. He finished his career at rivals FC Andijon.

Musabayev scored one goal in two appearances for Uzbekistan during the 1996 AFC Asian Cup qualifiers.
