= 1996 AFC Asian Cup =

كأس آسيا 1996

Tournament details
- Host country: United Arab Emirates
- Dates: 4–21 December
- Teams: 12
- Venues: 3 (in 3 host cities)

Final positions
- Champions: Saudi Arabia (3rd title)
- Runners-up: United Arab Emirates
- Third place: Iran
- Fourth place: Kuwait

Tournament statistics
- Matches played: 26
- Goals scored: 80 (3.08 per match)
- Attendance: 448,000 (17,231 per match)
- Top scorer: (Iran) Ali Daei (8 goals)
- Best player: (Iran) Khodadad Azizi
- Best goalkeeper: (Saudi Arabia) Mohamed Al-Deayea
- Fair play award: Iran

The 1996 AFC Asian Cup was the 11th edition of the men's AFC Asian Cup, a quadrennial international football tournament organised by the Asian Football Confederation (AFC). The finals were held in the United Arab Emirates between 4 and 21 December 1996. Saudi Arabia defeated hosts United Arab Emirates in the final match in Abu Dhabi. As the runners-up, the United Arab Emirates represented the AFC in the 1997 FIFA Confederations Cup as the winners Saudi Arabia had qualified automatically as host.

== Qualification ==
33 teams participated in a preliminary tournament. It was divided into 10 groups and the first-placed team of each group thus qualified.

The qualifying teams were:

Country	Qualified as	Date qualification was secured	Previous appearances in tournament^{1, 2}
United Arab Emirates	Hosts	29 April 1993	4 (1980, 1984, 1988, 1992)
Japan	1992 AFC Asian Cup winners	8 November 1992	2 (1988, **1992**)
Saudi Arabia	Qualifying round Group 9 winners	2 February 1996	3 (**1984**, **1988**, 1992)
China	Qualifying round Group 2 winners	4 February 1996	5 (1976, 1980, 1984, 1988, 1992)
Indonesia	Qualifying round Group 4 winners	6 March 1996	0 (Debut)
Uzbekistan	Qualifying round Group 8 winners	19 June 1996	0 (Debut)
Kuwait	Qualifying round Group 10 winners	20 June 1996	5 (1972, 1976, **1980**, 1984, 1988)
Iran	Qualifying round Group 5 winners	21 June 1996	7 (**1968**, **1972**, **1976**, 1980, 1984, 1988, 1992)
Thailand	Qualifying round Group 3 winners	9 July 1996	2 (1972, 1992)
Syria	Qualifying round Group 7 winners	19 July 1996	3 (1980, 1984, 1988)
South Korea	Qualifying round Group 1 winners	11 August 1996	7 (**1956**, **1960**, 1964, 1972, 1980, 1984, 1988)
Iraq	Qualifying round Group 6 winners	13 August 1996	2 (1972, 1976)

Notes:

^{1} Bold indicates champion for that year
^{2} Italic indicates host

== Tournament summary ==
The tournament began with host United Arab Emirates against South Korea in group A, where the Emiratis played in a 1–1 draw. Subsequently, Kuwait was surprisingly held to a draw by Indonesia, the lead even being taken by the Indonesians. However, the United Arab Emirates, Kuwait and South Korea eventually established their position, with South Korea finishing in third place due to losing to Kuwait and inferior goal difference and qualified only as one of two best third-placed teams, while the host comfortably seized first place, leaving Indonesia bottom after two consecutive defeats to South Korea and the UAE.

Group B easily saw Saudi Arabia, Iran and Iraq took three leading places in their group, with both teams managed to beat Thailand, which finished bottom with three defeats, and also each three of them suffered one defeat one to another. Iraq only finished third due to inferior goal difference, but qualified as the best third-place finisher.

Meanwhile, group C was more entertaining, with both three last finishers grabbed one win each only. Debutant Uzbekistan, on its just first ever competitive participation of a major tournament and was regarded low, stunned entire of Asia by beating China with two late goals to gain three points in the team's just first competitive match. Defending champions Japan however emerged as the only team to collect all three victories, while China recovered following the defeat to beat Syria. The Syrians grabbed its only win, a 2–1 win over Uzbekistan, but the team's poor performance, with two defeats to Japan and China, cost the team from reaching the quarter-finals. Uzbekistan finished last despite the win over China, and was eliminated as well.

The quarter-finals saw entire of East Asia slumped out. Defending champions Japan was crushed down by Kuwait, China lost after a seven-goal thriller with Saudi Arabia, while South Korea suffered a denting 2–6 loss to Iran, with Iran scored five goals in the second half. The host UAE continued its quest to win the trophy with a successful 1–0 win over Iraq thanked for the golden goal of Abdulrahman Ibrahim. The semi-finals became a West Asian affair and rematches of group A and B: Saudi Arabia took a successful revenge on Iran following the group stage, beating the Iranians on penalty, while the UAE killed Kuwaiti dream for the second time with another 1–0 win to set up final with Saudi Arabia. Iran eventually took third place after beating Kuwait on penalty, the match ended 1–1 draw.

The final between the UAE and Saudi Arabia happened to be boring than expected. The two teams played defensively and lacking enthusiastic attacks in front of 60,000 spectators. Eventually, penalty had to be brought out, where the UAE missed two while Saudi Arabia only missed one, thus Saudi Arabia was crowned for its third trophy in the country's fourth consecutive Asian Cup final. Thanked for the win, Saudi Arabia gained automatic berth to qualify for the 2000 AFC Asian Cup held in Lebanon.

== Venues ==
Abu Dhabi	Al Ain
Sheikh Zayed Stadium	Tahnoun bin Mohammed Stadium
Capacity: 60,000	Capacity: 15,000
Dubai	1996 AFC Asian Cup is located in United Arab Emirates
Al-Maktoum Stadium	1996 AFC Asian Cup is located in United Arab Emirates
Capacity: 12,000	1996 AFC Asian Cup is located in United Arab Emirates

== First round ==
All times are UAE time (UTC+4)

=== Group A ===
Pos	Team	Pld	W	D	L	GF	GA	GD	Pts	Qualification
1	United Arab Emirates (H)	3	2	1	0	6	3	+3	7	Advance to knockout stage
2	Kuwait	3	1	1	1	6	5	+1	4	Advance to knockout stage
3	South Korea	3	1	1	1	5	5	0	4	Advance to knockout stage
4	Indonesia	3	0	1	2	4	8	−4	1	

Source: RSSSF
(H) Hosts
4 December 1996
16:45

United Arab Emirates	1–1	South Korea
K. Saad 40'	Report	Hwang Sun-Hong 9'

Sheikh Zayed Stadium, Abu Dhabi
Attendance: 35,000
Referee: Pirom Un-Prasert (Thailand)
4 December 1996
18:45

Indonesia	2–2	Kuwait
Widodo 20'; Ronny 40'	Report	Al-Saqer 73'; Haji 84' (pen.)

Sheikh Zayed Stadium, Abu Dhabi
Attendance: 15,000
Referee: Jamal Al Sharif (Syria)

7 December 1996
16:45

United Arab Emirates	3–2	Kuwait
Saeed 53'; Al-Talyani 55'; B. Saad 80'	Report	Al-Huwaidi 9', 44'

Sheikh Zayed Stadium, Abu Dhabi
Attendance: 15,000
Referee: Charles Massembe (Uganda)
7 December 1996
19:00

South Korea	4–2	Indonesia
Kim Do-Hoon 5'; Hwang Sun-Hong 7', 15'; Ko Jeong-Woon 55'	Report	Ronny 58'; Widodo 65'

Sheikh Zayed Stadium, Abu Dhabi
Attendance: 2,000
Referee: Shamsul Maidin (Singapore)

10 December 1996
16:45

United Arab Emirates	2–0	Indonesia
Saeed 15'; Al-Talyani 64'	Report

Sheikh Zayed Stadium, Abu Dhabi
Attendance: 10,000
Referee: Lu Jun (China)
10 December 1996
19:00

Kuwait	2–0	South Korea
Al-Huwaidi 60'; B. Abdullah 87'	Report

Sheikh Zayed Stadium, Abu Dhabi
Attendance: 3,000
Referee: Mohd Nazri Abdullah (Malaysia)

=== Group B ===
Pos	Team	Pld	W	D	L	GF	GA	GD	Pts	Qualification
1	Iran	3	2	0	1	7	3	+4	6	Advance to knockout stage
2	Saudi Arabia	3	2	0	1	7	3	+4	6	Advance to knockout stage
3	Iraq	3	2	0	1	6	3	+3	6	Advance to knockout stage
4	Thailand	3	0	0	3	2	13	−11	0	

Source: RSSSF
5 December 1996
16:45

Saudi Arabia	6–0	Thailand
Al-Temawi 10' (pen.), 29' (pen.); Al-Mehallel 15', 54'; Al-Muwallid 18'; Al-Jaber 52'	Report

Al-Maktoum Stadium, Dubai
Attendance: 5,000
Referee: Gamal Al-Ghandour (Egypt)
5 December 1996
19:00

Iran	1–2	Iraq
Daei 90' (pen.)	Report	Fawzi 37'; Sabbar 69'

Al-Maktoum Stadium, Dubai
Attendance: 15,000
Referee: Masayoshi Okada (Japan)

8 December 1996
16:45

Saudi Arabia	1–0	Iraq
Al-Mehallel 26'	Report

Al-Maktoum Stadium, Dubai
Attendance: 12,000
Referee: Ali Bujsaim (United Arab Emirates)
8 December 1996
19:00

Thailand	1–3	Iran
Kiatisuk 80'	Report	Saadavi 38'; Minavand 54'; Daei 70'

Al-Maktoum Stadium, Dubai
Attendance: 12,000
Referee: Lu Jun (China)

11 December 1996
16:45

Saudi Arabia	0–3	Iran
	Report	Bagheri 12'; Daei 37'; Azizi 47'

Al-Maktoum Stadium, Dubai
Attendance: 12,000
Referee: Masayoshi Okada (Japan)
11 December 1996
19:00

Iraq	4–1	Thailand
Mahmoud 17', 50'; Hussein 23', 63'	Report	Dusit 26'

Al-Maktoum Stadium, Dubai
Attendance: 3,000
Referee: Kim Young-Joo (South Korea)

=== Group C ===
Pos	Team	Pld	W	D	L	GF	GA	GD	Pts	Qualification
1	Japan	3	3	0	0	7	1	+6	9	Advance to knockout stage
2	China	3	1	0	2	3	3	0	3	Advance to knockout stage
3	Syria	3	1	0	2	3	6	−3	3	
4	Uzbekistan	3	1	0	2	3	6	−3	3	

Source: RSSSF
6 December 1996
16:45

Japan	2–1	Syria
Abbas 85' (o.g.); Takagi 88'	Report	Joukhadar 8'

Tahnoun Bin Mohamed Stadium, Al Ain
Attendance: 10,000
Referee: Mohd Nazri Abdullah (Malaysia)
6 December 1996
19:00

China	0–2	Uzbekistan
	Report	Shkvyrin 78'; Shatskikh 90'

Tahnoun Bin Mohamed Stadium, Al Ain
Attendance: 3,000
Referee: Abdul Rahman Al-Zeid (Saudi Arabia)

9 December 1996
16:45

Japan	4–0	Uzbekistan
Nanami 7'; Miura 37'; Maezono 86', 90'	Report

Tahnoun Bin Mohamed Stadium, Al Ain
Attendance: 3,000
Referee: Jalal Moradi (Iran)
9 December 1996
19:00

Syria	0–3	China
	Report	Ma Mingyu 35'; Gao Feng 49'; Li Bing 73'

Tahnoun Bin Mohamed Stadium, Al Ain
Attendance: 4,000
Referee: Kim Young-Joo (South Korea)

12 December 1996
16:45

Japan	1–0	China
Soma 90'	Report

Tahnoun Bin Mohamed Stadium, Al Ain
Attendance: 2,000
Referee: Abdul Rahman Al-Zeid (Saudi Arabia)
12 December 1996
19:00

Uzbekistan	1–2	Syria
Lebedev 53' (pen.)	Report	Joukhadar 48'; Cheikh-Dib 74'

Tahnoun Bin Mohamed Stadium, Al Ain
Attendance: 2,000
Referee: Ali Bujsaim (United Arab Emirates)

=== Third-placed qualifiers ===
At the end of the first stage, a comparison was made between the third placed teams of each group. The two best third-placed teams advanced to the quarter-finals.

Pos	Team	Pld	W	D	L	GF	GA	GD	Pts	Qualification
1	Iraq	3	2	0	1	6	3	+3	6	Advance to knockout stage
2	South Korea	3	1	1	1	5	5	0	4	Advance to knockout stage
3	Syria	3	1	0	2	3	6	−3	3	

Source: RSSSF

Iraq (best third-place) and South Korea (second best third-place) qualified for the quarter-finals.

== Knockout stage ==
All times are UAE time (UTC+4)

Quarter-finals
15 December – Abu Dhabi
United Arab Emirates (a.e.t.)	1
Iraq	0
15 December – Al Ain
Kuwait	2
Japan	0
16 December – Dubai
South Korea	2
Iran	6
16 December – Abu Dhabi
Saudi Arabia	4
China	3

Semi-finals
18 December – Abu Dhabi
United Arab Emirates	1
Kuwait	0
18 December – Abu Dhabi
Iran	0 (3)
Saudi Arabia (pen.)	0 (4)

Final
21 December – Abu Dhabi
United Arab Emirates	0 (2)
Saudi Arabia (pen.)	0 (4)
Third place
21 December – Abu Dhabi
Kuwait	1 (2)
Iran (pen.)	1 (3)

=== Quarter-finals ===
15 December 1996
16:45

United Arab Emirates	1–0 (a.e.t./g.g.)	Iraq
Ab. Ibrahim 103'	Report

Sheikh Zayed Stadium, Abu Dhabi
Attendance: 55,000
Referee: Gamal Al-Ghandour (Egypt)

15 December 1996
19:30

Kuwait	2–0	Japan
Al-Huwaidi 17', 54'	Report

Tahnoun Bin Mohamed Stadium, Al Ain
Attendance: 2,000
Referee: Pirom Un-Prasert (Thailand)

16 December 1996
16:45

South Korea	2–6	Iran
Kim Do-Hoon 11'; Shin Tae-Yong 35'	Report	Bagheri 31'; Azizi 52'; Daei 66', 76', 83', 89' (pen.)

Al-Maktoum Stadium, Dubai
Attendance: 19,000
Referee: Jamal Al Sharif (Syria)

16 December 1996
19:30

Saudi Arabia	4–3	China
Al-Thunayan 31', 65'; Al-Jaber 34'; Al-Mehallel 43'	Report	Zhang Enhua 6', 89'; Peng Weiguo 16'

Sheikh Zayed Stadium, Abu Dhabi
Attendance: 5,000
Referee: Mohd Nazri Abdullah (Malaysia)

=== Semi-finals ===
19 December 1996
16:45

United Arab Emirates	1–0	Kuwait
Saeed 69'	Report

Sheikh Zayed Stadium, Abu Dhabi
Attendance: 55,000
Referee: Masayoshi Okada (Japan)

19 December 1996
19:30

Iran	0–0 (a.e.t.)	Saudi Arabia
	Report
Penalties
Daei (penalty missed); Peyrovani (penalty scored); Yazdani (penalty missed); Estili (penalty scored); Bagheri (penalty scored); Khakpour (penalty missed)	3–4	(penalty missed) Al-Temawi; (penalty scored) Sulaimani; (penalty scored) Zubromawi; (penalty missed) Al-Muwallid; (penalty scored) Al-Harbi; (penalty scored) Madani

Sheikh Zayed Stadium, Abu Dhabi
Attendance: 35,000
Referee: Gamal Al-Ghandour (Egypt)

=== Third place play-off ===
21 December 1996
16:45

Iran	1–1 (a.e.t.)	Kuwait
Daei 40'	Report	Al-Huwaidi 15'
Penalties
Moharrami (penalty missed); Estili (penalty scored); Peyrovani (penalty scored); Bagheri (penalty scored)	3–2	(penalty scored) Haji; (penalty scored) B. Abdullah; (penalty missed) Al-Lenqawi; (penalty missed) Mubarak; (penalty missed) Al-Huwaidi

Sheikh Zayed Stadium, Abu Dhabi
Attendance: 45,000
Referee: Kim Young-Joo (South Korea)

=== Final ===
21 December 1996
19:30

United Arab Emirates	0–0 (a.e.t.)	Saudi Arabia
	Report
Penalties
M. Ali (penalty scored); Hussain (penalty missed); K. Saad (penalty scored); Saeed (penalty missed)	2–4	(penalty scored) Al-Thunayan; (penalty scored) Zubromawi; (penalty missed) Al-Harbi; (penalty scored) Al-Temawi; (penalty scored) Al-Muwallid

Sheikh Zayed Stadium, Abu Dhabi
Attendance: 60,000
Referee: Mohd Nazri Abdullah (Malaysia)

GK	17	Muhsin Musabah
RB	6	Ismail Rashid Ismail
CB	5	Yousuf Hussain
CB	12	Hassan Mubarak
LB	3	Munther Abdullah
CM	15	Mohamed Ali
CM	16	Hassan Saeed	(yellow card) 16'
CM	18	Ahmed Ibrahim Ali	(yellow card) 53'
RF	7	Saad Bakheet Mubarak		(substituted off) 46'
CF	10	Adnan Al-Talyani (c)		(substituted off) 91'
LF	23	Abdel Ahmed		(substituted off) 46'
Substitutions:
MF	13	Abdul Aziz Mohamed		(substituted on) 46'
FW	11	Zuhair Bakhit		(substituted on) 46'
FW	14	Khamees Saad Mubarak		(substituted on) 91'
Manager:
(Croatia) Tomislav Ivić

GK	1	Mohamed Al-Deayea
RB	2	Mohammed Al-Jahani
CB	3	Mohammed Al-Khilaiwi		(substituted off) 77'
CB	4	Abdullah Zubromawi
LB	13	Hussein Abdulghani	(yellow card) 72' (yellow-red card) 87'
DM	16	Khamis Al-Owairan
RM	10	Fahad Al-Mehallel		(substituted off) 80'
CM	8	Khalid Al-Temawi
CM	14	Khaled Al-Muwallid
LM	15	Yousuf Al-Thunayan (c)
CF	9	Sami Al-Jaber		(substituted off) 62'
Substitutions:
FW	25	Abdullah Al-Dosari		(substituted on) 62'
MF	12	Ibrahim Al-Harbi		(substituted on) 77'
FW	20	Hamzah Idris		(substituted on) 80'
Manager:
(Portugal) Nelo Vingada

== Statistics ==
=== Goalscorers ===
With eight goals, Iran's Ali Daei is the top scorer of the tournament. In total, 80 goals were scored by 47 different players, with one of them credited as an own goal.

8 goals

- (Iran) Ali Daei

6 goals

- (Kuwait) Jasem Al-Huwaidi

4 goals

- (Saudi Arabia) Fahad Al-Mehallel

3 goals

- (South Korea) Hwang Sun-Hong
- (United Arab Emirates) Hassan Saeed

2 goals

- (China) Zhang Enhua
- (Indonesia) Widodo Putro
- (Indonesia) Ronny Wabia
- (Iran) Khodadad Azizi
- (Iran) Karim Bagheri
- (Iraq) Haidar Mahmoud
- (Iraq) Laith Hussein
- (Japan) Masakiyo Maezono
- (South Korea) Kim Do-Hoon
- (Saudi Arabia) Sami Al-Jaber
- (Saudi Arabia) Khalid Al-Temawi
- (Saudi Arabia) Yousuf Al-Thunayan
- (Syria) Nader Joukhadar
- (United Arab Emirates) Adnan Al-Talyani

1 goal

- (China) Gao Feng
- (China) Ma Mingyu
- (China) Li Bing
- (China) Peng Weiguo
- (Iran) Mehrdad Minavand
- (Iran) Naeim Saadavi
- (Iraq) Hussam Fawzi
- (Iraq) Khalid Mohammed Sabbar
- (Japan) Kazuyoshi Miura
- (Japan) Hiroshi Nanami
- (Japan) Naoki Soma
- (Japan) Takuya Takagi
- (South Korea) Ko Jeong-Woon
- (South Korea) Shin Tae-Yong
- (Kuwait) Bashar Abdullah
- (Kuwait) Badr Haji
- (Kuwait) Hani Al Saqer
- (Saudi Arabia) Khalid Al-Muwallid
- (Syria) Ali Cheikh Dib
- (Thailand) Dusit Chalermsan
- (Thailand) Kiatisuk Senamuang
- (United Arab Emirates) Abdulrahman Ibrahim
- (United Arab Emirates) Saad Bakheet Mubarak
- (United Arab Emirates) Khamis Saad
- (Uzbekistan) Sergey Lebedev
- (Uzbekistan) Oleg Shatskikh
- (Uzbekistan) Igor Shkvyrin

1 own goal

- (Syria) Hassan Abbas (for Japan)

=== Awards ===
Best player

- (Iran) Khodadad Azizi

Top scorer

- (Iran) Ali Daei

Best goalkeeper

- (Saudi Arabia) Mohamed Al-Deayea

Fair play award

- Iran

Team of the Tournament

Goalkeepers	Defenders	Midfielders	Forwards
(Saudi Arabia) Mohamed Al-Deayea	(Saudi Arabia) Abdullah Zubromawi (United Arab Emirates) Yousuf Hussain (Iran) Mohammad Khakpour	(Iran) Mehrdad Minavand (United Arab Emirates) Mohamed Ali (Saudi Arabia) Khalid Al-Muwallid (United Arab Emirates) Saad Bakheet Mubarak	(Saudi Arabia) Fahad Al-Mehallel (Kuwait) Jasem Al-Huwaidi (Iran) Ali Daei

== Marketing ==
=== Sponsorships ===
- Canon Inc.
- Clarion
- Coca-Cola
- Diadora
- Emirates
- Energizer
- Fujifilm
- Gillette
- Mild Seven
- Mitsubishi
- SABIC
- Sanyo
