= Gao Feng (footballer) =

Chinese footballer (born 1971)

Gao Feng 高峰
Personal information
- Date of birth: 22 April 1971 (age 55)
- Place of birth: Shenyang, Liaoning, China
- Height: 1.78 m (5 ft 10 in)
- Position: Striker

Youth career
- 1984–1988: Liaoning
- 1988–1990: Beijing

Senior career*
Years	Team	Apps	(Gls)
1990–1991	Chinese Olympic Development Team	?	(4)
1992–1993	Beijing	?	(3)
1994–1996	Beijing Guoan	55	(21)
1997–1999	Qianwei Huandao	58	(20)
2000	Shenyang Sealion	15	(1)
2001–2002	Tianjin TEDA	23	(2)

International career^{‡}
1992–1997	China	32	(9)
Medal record
Men's football
Representing China
Asian Games
Silver medal – second place	1994 Hiroshima	Football
- * Club domestic league appearances and goals as of 14:33, 13 March 2010 (UTC) ‡ National team caps and goals as of 14:33, 13 March 2010 (UTC)

Gao Feng (Simplified Chinese: 高峰) (born 22 April 1971) is a Chinese former international footballer who played as a striker for Beijing Guoan, Qianwei Huandao, Shenyang Sealion before retiring with Tianjin TEDA. In his personal life was also married to Chinese vocalist Na Ying and had a son together, but the couple divorced in 2005.

== Biography ==
Gao Feng started his football career playing for the Beijing Football Team until the 1994 league season saw full professionism within the league and the club renamed themselves Beijing Guoan. Throughout his time at Beijing, Gao showed a highly efficient goal scoring ability with excellent stamina, which saw him as their first choice striker when they won the 1996 Chinese FA Cup. His goal-scoring ability soon saw him be included in the Chinese national team and he was called up to the team that went to the 1996 AFC Asian Cup, where China were knocked out in the quarter-finals against Saudi Arabia on 16 December 1996 in a 4-3 defeat. By the 1997 league season he transferred to top tier side Qianwei Huandao and was part of the team that gained mid-table mediocrity. By the 1999 league season he was also part of the team that decided to move to Chongqing and renamed themselves Chongqing Longxin before transferring to Shenyang Sealion and then Tianjin TEDA, where he retired.

Gao Feng took part in the Chinese version of Dancing with the Stars in 2014. On 9 March 2015, Gao Feng was arrested after an assault on a taxi driver.

== International goals ==
No.	Date	Venue	Opponent	Score	Result	Competition
1.	1 October 1994	Hiroshima, Japan	Turkmenistan	1–1	2–2	1994 Asian Games
2.	3 October 1994	Hiroshima, Japan	Yemen	1–0	4–0	1994 Asian Games
3.	1 February 1996	Kowloon, Hong Kong	Philippines	6–0	7–0	1996 AFC Asian Cup qualification
4.	9 December 1996	Al Ain, UAE	Syria	2–0	3–0	1996 AFC Asian Cup

== Honours ==
Beijing Guoan

- Chinese FA Cup: 1996
