= Bader Haji =

Kuwaiti footballer

Badr Haji
Personal information
- Full name: Badr Haji Al-Halabeej
- Date of birth: 19 December 1967 (age 58)
- Place of birth: Kuwait
- Position: Midfielder

Youth career
- –: Al-Salmiya SC
- –: Kazma SC

Senior career*
Years	Team	Apps	(Gls)
1984–1999	Kazma SC		
1999–1999	Al Shabab FC		
1999–2003	Kazma SC		

International career
1988–2000	Kuwait	55	(8)
- * Club domestic league appearances and goals

Badr Haji Al-Halabeej (born 19 December 1967) is a Kuwaiti former footballer who played as a midfielder. He represented his country in the 1996 and 2000 AFC Asian Cup.

== Honours ==
=== Personal ===
- Best Arab player in 1994
- Best player of the 1998 Arab Cup in Qatar
- Best player of the 14th Arabian Gulf Cup in Bahrain

=== Club ===
- Winner four times the Kuwaiti Premier League in 1986, 1987, 1994, 1996 with Kazma SC
- Winner twice the Kuwait Emir Cup in 1982, 1984, 1990, 1995 with Kazma SC
- Winner once the Kuwait Crown Prince Cup in 1995 with Kazma SC
- Winner once the Saudi Crown Prince Cup in 1999 with Al Shabab FC
- Winner twice the GCC Club Cup in 1987, 1995 with Kazma SC

=== National ===
- Winner twice of the Arabian Gulf Cup 1996 in Oman and 1998 in Bahrain
- Third place in the 1998 Arab Cup in Qatar
