= Yousuf Al-Thunayan =

Saudi Arabian footballer

Yousuf Al-Thunayyan
Personal information
- Full name: Yousuf Al-Thunayyan
- Date of birth: November 18, 1963 (age 62)
- Place of birth: Riyadh, Saudi Arabia
- Height: 1.74 m (5 ft 8 1/2 in)
- Positions: Winger; attacking midfielder

Youth career
- 1981–1983: Al-Hilal

Senior career*
Years	Team	Apps	(Gls)
1984–2003	Al-Hilal	350	(88)

International career
1986–1998	Saudi Arabia	81	(20)
- * Club domestic league appearances and goals

Yousuf Al-Thunayyan (Arabic: يوسف الثُنيان, born November 18, 1963) is a former association football winger and attacking midfielder from Saudi Arabia. He spent all 21 seasons of his senior career at Al-Hilal FC. A playmaker known for vision and technique, Al-Thunayyan was nicknamed "The Philosopher" for his dribbling, goal scoring, and playmaking skills. He is widely regarded as one of the greatest Saudi and Asian players of all time.

== Club career ==
Al-Thunayan played his entire club career for Al-Hilal, joining the first team in 1984 and retiring in 2005 after winning a total of 24 titles with the club. On 14 December 2005, Al-Hilal hosted Valencia in his farewell match. Particular highlights are Asian Club Championship 1991 Winner and Asian Club Championship 1999-2000 Winner.

== International career ==
During his active career, Al-Thunayan played 95 international matches and scored 33 goals for the Saudi Arabia national team. At the age of 34 he was selected for his only Football World Cup, and appeared in two games, scoring from the penalty spot in the 2–2 draw with South Africa. Yousuf represented Saudi Arabia in 3 consecutive AFC Asian Cup finals in 1988, 1992 and 1996, winning two out of these three.

=== 1988 AFC Asian Cup (Qatar) ===
Yousuf took over the starting forward role mid-way through the tournament coached by Carlos Alberto Parreira. He played against Bahrain in the group stage which ended 1-1. He also played an important game vs China which Saudi Arabia won 1–0. He played the semi finals against Iran which Saudi Arabia won 1–0. He also played in the final against South Korea which Saudi Arabia won on penalties.

=== 1992 AFC Asian Cup (Japan) ===
He scored a goal in a group stage game against China which ended 1-1. He also played a group stage game against Qatar which again ended 1-1. In the final group stage game, Yousuf scored a goal in a 4–0 game against Thailand. Yousuf led the team to defeat UAE 2–0 in the semi finals. Yousuf played the final in which Saudi Arabia lost to Japan.

=== 1992 King Fahd Cup, later known as the FIFA Confederations Cup ===
The King Fahd Cup was the last stop prior to Asian World Cup qualifiers. Saudi Arabia beat USA 3–0, with Yousuf scoring a goal.

=== 1996 AFC Asian Cup (UAE) ===
Yousuf was on the bench but was substituted in the game against Iran, which Saudi Arabia lost 3–0. A Quarter final game against China started badly, with Saudi Arabia down 2–0. Yousuf scored a goal and made an assist, and in the end Saudi Arabia won the game 4–2. In the Semi Finals game vs Iran, Saudi Arabia won the match on penalties 4–3. Saudi Arabia won 4–2 against UAE, the host nation, with Yousuf playing the whole game and scoring a critical first penalty shot. This was a second continental Asian Cup for Yousuf and a third for Saudi Arabia.

=== 1998 Arab Cup ===
Yousuf scored in the semi final game against Kuwait which ended 2-1. In the final against Qatar, he made an assist to clinch the title for Saudi Arabia.

=== 1998 World Cup ===
As Saudi Arabia failed to qualify for the 1986 and 1990 World Cup, Yousuf had only one chance to play on the World Cup near the end of his peak. He appeared as a substitute against Denmark in which Saudi Arabia lost 1–0. Yousuf scored a penalty kick to earn Saudi Arabia a 2–2 draw vs South Africa, resulting in the only point for Saudi Arabia in 1998 World Cup. He captained the team in the game.

=== International goals ===
#	Date	Venue	Opponent	Score	Result	Competition
1	25 February 1986	Khobar, Saudi Arabia	Wales	1–2	Lost	Friendly
2	3 October 1986	Seoul, South Korea	Kuwait	2–2	Drew	1986 Asian Games
3	15 March 1989	Jeddah Saudi Arabia	Syria	5–4	Won	1990 FIFA World Cup qualification (AFC)
4	15 October 1992	Riyadh, Saudi Arabia	United States	3–0	Won	FIFA Confederations Cup
5	29 October 1992	Hiroshima, Japan	China	1–1	Drew	1992 AFC Asian Cup
6	2 November 1992	Hiroshima, Japan	Thailand	4–0	Won	1992 AFC Asian Cup
7	29 December 1995	Jeddah, Saudi Arabia	Kazakhstan	3–0	Won	Friendly
8	29 December 1995	Jeddah, Saudi Arabia	Kazakhstan	3–0	Won	Friendly
9	24 January 1996	Riyadh, Saudi Arabia	Kyrgyzstan	3–0	Won	1996 AFC Asian Cup qualification
10	24 January 1996	Riyadh, Saudi Arabia	Kyrgyzstan	3–0	Won	1996 AFC Asian Cup qualification
11	28 January 1996	Riyadh, Saudi Arabia	Yemen	4–0	Won	1996 AFC Asian Cup qualification
12	28 January 1996	Riyadh, Saudi Arabia	Yemen	4–0	Won	1996 AFC Asian Cup qualification
13	31 January 1996	Riyadh, Saudi Arabia	Kyrgyzstan	2–0	Won	1996 AFC Asian Cup qualification
14	21 October 1996	Muscat, Oman	Bahrain	3–1	Won	13th Arabian Gulf Cup
15	16 December 1996	Abu Dhabi, United Arab Emirates	China	4–3	Won	1996 AFC Asian Cup
16	16 December 1996	Abu Dhabi, United Arab Emirates	China	4–3	Won	1996 AFC Asian Cup
17	14 September 1997	Riyadh, Saudi Arabia	Kuwait	2–1	Won	1998 FIFA World Cup qualification (AFC)
18	24 June 1998	Bordeaux, France	South Africa	2–2	Drew	1998 FIFA World Cup
19	29 September 1998	Doha, Qatar	Kuwait	2–1	Won	1998 Arab Nations Cup
20	2 November 1998	Manama, Bahrain	Bahrain	1–1	Drew	14th Arabian Gulf Cup

== Honours ==
=== Club ===
- Saudi Premier League : 1985, 1986, 1988, 1990, 1996, 1998, 2002
- Saudi King Cup : 1984, 1989
- Crown Prince Cup : 1995, 2000
- Saudi Federation Cup : 1987, 1996, 2000
- Saudi Founder's Cup : 2000
- AFC Champions League : 1991, 2000
- Asian Cup Winners Cup : 1997
- Asian Super Cup : 1997
- Arab Champions League : 1994, 1995
- Arab Super Cup : 2001
- GCC Club Cup : 1986, 1998

=== International ===
- AFC Asian Cup
  - Winners (2) : 1988, 1996
  - Runners-up (1) : 1992
- FIFA Confederations Cup
  - Runners-Up (1) : 1992
- Arabian Gulf Cup
  - Runners-up (1) : 1998
- Arab Nations Cup
  - Winners (1) : 1998
  - Runners-up (1) : 1992

=== Individual ===
- 1986, 1991-92 Asian Club Championship - Best player

== Farewell match ==
2005-12-14
18:00 GMT

Al-Hilal (Saudi Arabia)	2–1	(Spain) Valencia
Al-Qahtani 452'; Al-Jumaan 134'		Regueiro 80'

King Fahd Stadium, Riyadh
Attendance: more than 65,000
