= Ahmed Ibrahim Ali =

Emirati footballer (born 1970)

Personal information
- Full name: Ahmed Ibrahim Ali
- Date of birth: 15 November 1970 (age 55)
- Place of birth: United Arab Emirates
- Position: Midfielder

Senior career*
Years	Team	Apps	(Gls)
- Al-Sharjah

International career
1997	United Arab Emirates	8	(0)
- * Club domestic league appearances and goals

Ahmed Ibrahim Ali (Arabic: أَحْمَد إِبْرَاهِيم عَلِيّ; born 15 November 1970) is a UAE football midfielder who played for United Arab Emirates in the 1996 Asian Cup. He also played for Al-Sharjah.
