= Nader Joukhadar =

Syrian footballer (1977–2023)

Personal information
- Full name: Nader Abdulkarim Joukhadar
- Date of birth: 19 October 1977
- Place of birth: Syria
- Date of death: 6 February 2023 (aged 45)
- Place of death: Jableh, Syria
- Position: Forward

Senior career*
Years	Team	Apps	(Gls)
1996–2001	Al-Wathba		
2001–2003	Al-Faisaly		
2003–2004	Al-Wathba		
2004–2005	Al-Faisaly		
2005–2008	Al-Wehdat		

International career
1995	Syria U20	3	(0)
1995–1997	Syria	14	(9)

Managerial career
- 2022: Salam Zgharta
- * Club domestic league appearances and goals

Nader Abdulkarim Joukhadar (Arabic: نَادِر جُوخَدَار; 19 October 1977 – 6 February 2023) was a Syrian football coach and player. He played as a forward for Syria in the 1996 Asian Cup.

Joukhadar died in Jableh, alongside his son, during the 2023 Turkey–Syria earthquake. He was 45.

== Managerial career ==
In July 2022, Joukhadar was appointed head coach of Salam Zgharta in the Lebanese Premier League. He was dismissed on 10 August.
