= Ismail Rashid Ismail =

Emirati footballer (born 1972)

Personal information
- Date of birth: 27 October 1972 (age 54)
- Place of birth: United Arab Emirates
- Position: Defender

Senior career*
Years	Team	Apps	(Gls)
–2004	Al Wasl FC		

International career
1992–2000	United Arab Emirates	74	(2)
- * Club domestic league appearances and goals

Ismail Rashid Ismail is a UAE football defender who played for United Arab Emirates in the 1996 Asian Cup. He also played for Al Wasl FC.
