= Khalid Al-Temawi =

Saudi Arabian footballer

Personal information
- Full name: Khalid Al-Temawi
- Date of birth: 19 April 1969 (age 57)
- Place of birth: Ha'il, Saudi Arabia
- Height: 1.76 m (5 ft 9 1/2 in)
- Position: Midfielder

Youth career
- Al-Hilal

Senior career*
Years	Team	Apps	(Gls)
1990–2001	Al-Hilal		

International career
1993–1999	Saudi Arabia	68	(8)
- * Club domestic league appearances and goals

Khalid al Temawi (born 19 April 1969) is a retired Saudi Arabian footballer.

Al Temawi made several appearances for the Saudi Arabia national football team, including playing in 13 qualifying matches for the 1994 and 1998 FIFA World Cups, as well as three matches at the 1997 FIFA Confederations Cup. He also played at the 1996 AFC Asian Cup, where Saudi Arabia became champions.
