= Khamis Al-Owairan =

Saudi Arabian footballer (1973–2020)

Personal information
- Full name: Khamis Al-Owairan Al-Dossari
- Date of birth: 8 September 1973
- Place of birth: Riyadh, Saudi Arabia
- Date of death: 7 January 2020 (aged 46)
- Height: 1.78 m (5 ft 10 in)
- Position: Midfielder

Senior career*
| Years | Team | Apps | (Gls) |
| 1991–2001 | Al-Hilal | | |
| 2001–2007 | Al Ittihad | | |

International career
| 1994–2004 | Saudi Arabia | 105 | (0) |
Medal record
Men's football
Representing Saudi Arabia
FIFA Arab Cup
| Winner | 1998 |
AFC Asian Cup
| Winner | 1996 |
- * Club domestic league appearances and goals

Khamis Al-Owairan Al-Dossari (Arabic: خميس العويران الدوسري) (8 September 1973 – 7 January 2020) was a Saudi Arabian footballer. He played most of his career for Al-Hilal and Al Ittihad.

Al-Owairan played for the Saudi Arabia national football team and was a participant at the 1998 and 2002 FIFA World Cup as well as the 1996 Summer Olympics.

== Death ==
Al-Owairan died on January 7, 2020, after a battle with cancer, as announced by his family.

== See also ==
- List of men's footballers with 100 or more international caps
