= Bakheet Saad Mubarak =

Emirati footballer (born 1970)

Saad Bakheet Mubarak
Personal information
- Full name: Saad Bakheet Mubarak
- Date of birth: 15 October 1970 (age 56)
- Place of birth: United Arab Emirates
- Position: Winger

Senior career*
Years	Team	Apps	(Gls)
- Al Shabab

International career
1992–2001	United Arab Emirates	62	(15)
- * Club domestic league appearances and goals

Saad Bakheet Mubarak (Arabic: سَعْد بَخِيت مُبَارَك; born 15 October 1970) is an Emirati footballer who represented the UAE at the 1996 AFC Asian Cup. He also played for Al Shabab. He usually played on the right flank.

Scores and results list United Arab Emirates' goal tally first, score column indicates score after each Mubarak goal.

List of international goals scored by Bakheet Saad Mubarak
No.	Date	Venue	Opponent	Score	Result	Competition	Ref.
1	27 May 1992	Al Ain, United Arab Emirates	Kuwait	1–0	3–2	1992 AFC Asian Cup qualification	
2	30 May 1992	Al Ain, United Arab Emirates	Bahrain	2–0	3–1	1992 AFC Asian Cup qualification	
3	26 August 1994	Grassau, Germany	Ukraine	1–0	1–1	Friendly	
4	26 March 1996	Al Maktoum Stadium, Dubai, United Arab Emirates	Morocco	1–0	1–0	Friendly	
5	21 May 1996	Bežigrad Stadium, Ljubljana, Slovenia	Slovenia	2–0	2–2	Friendly	
6	14 August 1996	Révész Géza utcai Stadion, Siófok, Hungary	Hungary	1–3	1–3	Friendly	
7	20 August 1996	Sportpark Ronhof Thomas Sommer, Fürth, Germany	Belarus	1–0	1–0	Friendly	
8	18 October 1996	Sultan Qaboos Sports Complex, Muscat, Oman	Bahrain	1–0	1–1	13th Arabian Gulf Cup	
9	22 October 1996	Sultan Qaboos Sports Complex, Muscat, Oman	Kuwait	1–1	2–1	13th Arabian Gulf Cup	
10	19 November 1996	Zayed Sports City Stadium, Abu Dhabi, United Arab Emirates	Uzbekistan	1–0	4–2	Friendly	
11	7 December 1996	Zayed Sports City Stadium, Abu Dhabi, United Arab Emirates	Kuwait	3–2	3–2	1996 AFC Asian Cup	
12	19 March 1997	Abu Dhabi, United Arab Emirates	Lebanon	1–0	2–1	Friendly	
13	29 March 1997	Sharjah Stadium, Sharjah, United Arab Emirates	Norway	1–1	1–4	Friendly	
14	2 September 1997	Al Nahyan Stadium, Abu Dhabi, United Arab Emirates	Iran	3–1	3–1	Friendly	
15	27 September 1997	Pakhtakor Central Stadium, Tashkent, Uzbekistan	Uzbekistan	2–1	3–2	1998 FIFA World Cup qualification	
