= Khaled Massad =

Saudi Arabian footballer (born 1971)

Khalid Massad
Personal information
- Full name: Khalid Massad Al-Muwalid
- Date of birth: 23 November 1971 (age 54)
- Place of birth: Jeddah, Saudi Arabia
- Height: 1.80 m (5 ft 11 in)
- Position: Midfielder

Senior career*
Years	Team	Apps	(Gls)
1986–2000	Al-Ahli	387	(139)
2000–2003	Al-Ittihad		

International career
1988–1998	Saudi Arabia	114	(28)
- * Club domestic league appearances and goals

Khalid Massad Al-Muwalid (Arabic: خالد مسعد المولد; born 23 November 1971) is a Saudi Arabian former footballer. He played most of his career for Al Ahli and Al Ittihad.

Al-Muwallid also played for the Saudi Arabia national football team and was a member of the national team at the 1994 and 1998 FIFA World Cups.

== International career ==
=== International goals ===
Scores and results list Saudi Arabia's goal tally first.

#	Date	Venue	Opponent	Result	Competition	Scored
1	28 September 1990	Beijing, China	Japan	2-0	1990 Asian Games	1
2	14 September 1992	Aleppo, Syria	Kuwait	2-0	1992 Arab Cup	1
3	15 October 1992	Riyadh, Saudi Arabia	United States	3-0	1992 King Fahd Cup	1
4	31 October 1992	Hiroshima, Japan	Qatar	1-1	1992 Asian Cup	1
5	4 December 1992	Doha, Qatar	Oman	2-0	1992 Gulf Cup	1
6	6 December 1992	Doha, Qatar	Kuwait	2-1	1992 Gulf Cup	1
7	1 May 1993	Kuala Lumpur, Malaysia	Macau	6-0	1994 World Cup qualifier	1
8	3 May 1993	Kuala Lumpur, Malaysia	Malaysia	1-1	1994 World Cup qualifier	1
9	14 May 1993	Riyadh, Saudi Arabia	Macau	8-0	1994 World Cup qualifier	1
10, 11	6 October 1993	Khobar, Saudi Arabia	Russia	4-2	Friendly	2
12	18 October 1993	Doha, Qatar	North Korea	2-1	1994 World Cup qualifier	1
13	10 November 1994	Abu Dhabi, United Arab Emirates	Bahrain	3-1	1994 Gulf Cup	1
14	17 December 1994	Riyadh, Saudi Arabia	Costa Rica	1-3	Friendly	1
15, 16	3 October 1996	Khobar, Saudi Arabia	New Zealand	3-0	Friendly	2
17	21 October 1996	Muscat, Oman	Bahrain	3-1	1996 Gulf Cup	1
18	6 November 1996	Riyadh, Saudi Arabia	Bulgaria	1-0	Friendly	1
19	14 November 1996	Riyadh, Saudi Arabia	Syria	3-1	Friendly	1
20	5 December 1996	Dubai, United Arab Emirates	Thailand	6-0	1996 Asian Cup	1
21	20 March 1997	Kuala Lumpur, Malaysia	Bangladesh	4-1	1998 World Cup qualifier	1
22, 23	29 March 1997	Jeddah, Saudi Arabia	Malaysia	3-0	1998 World Cup qualifier	2
24	31 March 1997	Jeddah, Saudi Arabia	Chinese Taipei	6-0	1998 World Cup qualifier	1
25	25 September 1997	Riyadh, Saudi Arabia	Mali	5-1	Friendly	1
26	17 October 1997	Kuwait City, Kuwait	Kuwait	1-2	1998 World Cup qualifier	1
27	24 October 1997	Riyadh, Saudi Arabia	Iran	1-0	1998 World Cup qualifier	1
28	6 November 1997	Riyadh, Saudi Arabia	China	1-1	1998 World Cup qualifier	1

== Championships ==
With Al-Ahli Club:

- 1998 Crown Prince Cup.
- Prince Faisal bin Fahd Cup 2001.

With Al Ittihad Club:

- Saudi League Championship 2001.
- Saudi-Egyptian Super Cup 2001.
- Saudi League Championship 2003.

International and individual achievements with the national team:

- Gulf Cup 12 in Bahrain.
- 88th Asian Cup in Qatar.
- 96th Asian Cup in the UAE.
- Participation in the 94th World Cup in United States and 98th in France.
- 3 participations in the Confederations Cup 1992, 1995, 1997 AD.
- He participated in the U-17 World Cup twice, the first in 1985 in China and the second in 1987 in Canada.
- Participation in the FIFA U-20 World Cup 1987 in Chile.
- 1998 Arab Cup Championship.

Individual Achievements:

- Player of the season in Al-Ahli 1992.
- Best Arab player in 1992.
- Best player in the 1992 Arab Cup for National Teams.
- The third best Asian player in 1992/93.
- Participated in the Asian Stars team in 1993.
- Best Arab player in 1996.
- Best Gulf player in 1996.
- The national team's top scorer in the 98 World Cup qualifiers.
- Participated in the World Stars team in 2000.
- FIFA chose his goal in America in the 1992 Confederations Cup as one of the 13 best goals in the history of the tournament.
- He was chosen by the International Federation among the 10 best players of the decade in the continent of Asia (1990–2000).
- The most goals scored in the history of the Saudi Arabia national team midfielder (28 goals).

== See also ==
- List of men's footballers with 100 or more international caps
