= Munther Ali Abdullah =

Emirati footballer (born 1975)

Munther Abdullah
Personal information
- Date of birth: 12 January 1975 (age 51)
- Place of birth: United Arab Emirates
- Position: Midfielder

Senior career*
Years	Team	Apps	(Gls)
- Al Wasl FC

International career
1997–1998	United Arab Emirates	4	(0)
- * Club domestic league appearances and goals

Munther Ali Abdullah (Arabic: مُنْذِر عَلِيّ عَبْد الله; born 12 January 1975) is a UAE football midfielder who played for the United Arab Emirates in the 1996 Asian Cup as a midfielder. He also played for Al Wasl FC.
