= Abdullah Sulaiman Zubromawi =

Saudi Arabian footballer

Abdullah Sulaiman
Personal information
- Full name: Abdullah Sulaiman Zubromawi
- Date of birth: 15 November 1973 (age 52)
- Place of birth: Jeddah, Saudi Arabia
- Height: 1.81 m (5 ft 11 in)
- Position: Defender

Senior career*
| Years | Team | Apps | (Gls) |
| 1992–2001 | Al-Ahli Jeddah | | |
| 2001–2006 | Al-Hilal | | |
| 2006–2009 | Damac F.C. | | |

International career
| 1993–2002 | Saudi Arabia | 142 | (3) |
- * Club domestic league appearances and goals

Abdullah Sulaiman Zubromawi (Arabic: عبد الله سليمان زبرماوي) (born 15 November 1973) is a former football defender from Saudi Arabia. Between 1993 and 2002, he played 141 international matches and scored 4 goals for the national team. He was part of the national team that played at the 1994, 1998 and 2002 World Cups. At the club level, he played mostly for Al-Ahli and Al-Hilal in his home country.

Zubromawi also represented Saudi Arabia at the 1996 Summer Olympics.

== International goals ==
| No. | Date | Venue | Opponent | Score | Result | Competition |
|---|---|---|---|---|---|---|
| 1. | 7 October 1994 | Bingo Stadium, Hiroshima, Japan | Malaysia | 2–1 | 2–1 | 1994 Asian Games |

== Honours ==
Individual

- AFC Fans' All-time XI at the FIFA World Cup: 2020

== See also ==
- List of men's footballers with 100 or more international caps
