= Ibrahim Mater =

Saudi Arabian footballer

Personal information
- Full name: Ibrahim Mater Al-Harbi
- Date of birth: 10 July 1975 (age 51)
- Place of birth: Riyadh, Saudi Arabia
- Height: 1.78 m (5 ft 10 in)
- Position: Midfielder

Senior career*
Years	Team	Apps	(Gls)
1993–2007	Al-Nassr		
2007–2009	Ohud		

International career
1996–2003	Saudi Arabia	61	(1)
- * Club domestic league appearances and goals

Ibrahim Mater Al-Harbi (Arabic: ابراهيم الحربي; born 10 July 1975) is a retired Saudi Arabian football midfielder.

== Career ==
Al-Harbi played club football for Al-Nassr and Ohud. He also played for the national team, with which he participated in the 1996 Summer Olympics and 1998 FIFA World Cup.
