= Khamees Saad Mubarak =

Emirati footballer (born 1970)

Personal information
- Date of birth: 4 October 1970 (age 56)
- Place of birth: United Arab Emirates
- Position: Forward

Senior career*
| Years | Team | Apps | (Gls) |
- Al Shabab

International career
| 1997 | United Arab Emirates | 7 | (4) |
- * Club domestic league appearances and goals

Khamees Saad Mubarak is a UAE football forward who played for United Arab Emirates in the 1996 Asian Cup. He also played for Al Shabab
