= 1992 AFC Asian Cup =

1992 Asian Cup
第10回アジアカップ1992

Tournament details
- Host country: Japan
- Dates: 29 October – 8 November
- Teams: 8
- Venues: 3 (in 2 host cities)

Final positions
- Champions: Japan (1st title)
- Runners-up: Saudi Arabia
- Third place: China
- Fourth place: United Arab Emirates

Tournament statistics
- Matches played: 16
- Goals scored: 31 (1.94 per match)
- Attendance: 316,496 (19,781 per match)
- Top scorer: (Saudi Arabia) Fahad Al-Bishi (3 goals)
- Best player: (Japan) Kazuyoshi Miura

The 1992 AFC Asian Cup (Japanese: 第10回アジアカップ1992) was the 10th international association football championship for members of the Asian Football Confederation (AFC). Hosted by Japan, the competition ran from 30 October to 8 November 1992 and was contested by the national teams of China, Iran, Japan, North Korea, Qatar, Saudi Arabia, Thailand and the United Arab Emirates.

The final was contested by Japan and two-time defending champions Saudi Arabia. Takuya Takagi scored the only goal of the match as Japan won the competition for the first time.

== Background ==
The inaugural AFC Asian Cup was held in Hong Kong in 1956. Saudi Arabia were two-time defending champions after defeating China 2–0 in the final in 1984 and South Korea on penalties in the final of the previous edition in 1988. Iran were the most successful team in the history of the competition, having won the title three times previously.

== Qualification ==
Japan qualified automatically as hosts and Saudi Arabia qualified automatically as holders. In total, 20 teams were included in the qualifying draw.

The teams were split into six qualifying groups of three or four. Group winners Qatar, the United Arab Emirates, Iran, North Korea, China and Thailand qualified for the final tournament.

=== Participants ===
Nations qualified for the 1992 AFC Asian Cup
Team	Qualified as	Qualified on	Previous appearance
Japan	Hosts	N/A	1 (1988)
Saudi Arabia	1988 AFC Asian Cup champions	18 December 1988	2 (1984, 1988)
Qatar	Group 1 winners	31 May 1992	3 (1980, 1984, 1988)
United Arab Emirates	Group 2 winners	30 May 1992	3 (1980, 1984, 1988)
Iran	Group 3 winners	15 May 1992	6 (1968, 1972, 1976, 1980, 1984, 1988)
North Korea	Group 4 winners	7 June 1992	1 (1980)
China	Group 5 winners	26 April 1992	4 (1976, 1980, 1984, 1988)
Thailand	Group 6 winners	23 June 1992	1 (1972)

== Format ==
The eight teams were drawn into two single round robin groups of four teams. The group winners and runners-up would contest the semi-finals which would decide the teams contesting the final and the third-place play-off.

== Venues ==
Matches were played at the Hiroshima Big Arch and the Hiroshima Stadium in Hiroshima and the Bingo Athletic Stadium in Onomichi.

Hiroshima
Hiroshima Big Arch	Hiroshima Stadium
Capacity: 50,000	Capacity: 13,800
Onomichi	1992 AFC Asian Cup is located in Hiroshima Prefecture
Bingo Athletic Stadium	1992 AFC Asian Cup is located in Hiroshima Prefecture
Capacity: 9,245	1992 AFC Asian Cup is located in Hiroshima Prefecture

== Group stage ==
=== Group A ===
Japan and the United Arab Emirates advanced to the semi-finals.

==== Table ====
Pos	Team	Pld	W	D	L	GF	GA	GD	Pts	Qualification
1	Japan	3	1	2	0	2	1	+1	4	Advance to semi-finals
2	United Arab Emirates	3	1	2	0	2	1	+1	4	Advance to semi-finals
3	Iran	3	1	1	1	2	1	+1	3	
4	North Korea	3	0	1	2	2	5	−3	1	

==== Matches ====
30 October 1992
17:00

North Korea	0–2	Iran
		Pious 30'; Ghayeghran 80'

Bingo Sports Park, Onomichi
Attendance: 8,000
Referee: Omer Al-Mehannah (Saudi Arabia)
30 October 1992
19:00

Japan	0–0	United Arab Emirates

Bingo Sports Park, Onomichi
Attendance: 9,000
Referee: Wei Jihong (China)

1 November 1992
12:00

Iran	0–0	United Arab Emirates

Hiroshima Big Arch, Hiroshima
Attendance: 25,000
Referee: Jamal Al Sharif (Syria)
1 November 1992
14:00

Japan	1–1	North Korea
Nakayama 80'		Kim Kwang-min 29' (pen.)

Hiroshima Big Arch, Hiroshima
Attendance: 32,000
Referee: Rasheed Al-Jassas (Kuwait)

3 November 1992
12:00

United Arab Emirates	2–1	North Korea
K. Mubarak 81'; Bakhit 85'		Kim Kwang-min 69'

Hiroshima Big Arch, Hiroshima
Attendance: 33,000
Referee: Neji Jouini (Tunisia)
3 November 1992
14:00

Japan	1–0	Iran
Miura 87'

Hiroshima Big Arch, Hiroshima
Attendance: 37,000
Referee: Jamal Al Sharif (Syria)

=== Group B ===
Saudi Arabia and China advanced to the semi-finals.

==== Table ====
Pos	Team	Pld	W	D	L	GF	GA	GD	Pts	Qualification
1	Saudi Arabia	3	1	2	0	6	2	+4	4	Advance to semi-finals
2	China	3	1	2	0	3	2	+1	4	Advance to semi-finals
3	Qatar	3	0	2	1	3	4	−1	2	
4	Thailand	3	0	2	1	1	5	−4	2	

==== Matches ====
29 October 1992
17:00

Saudi Arabia	1–1	China
Al-Thunayan 17'		Li Bing 41'

Hiroshima Big Arch, Hiroshima
Attendance: 15,000
Referee: Sinichoro Obata (Japan)
29 October 1992
19:00

Thailand	1–1	Qatar
Thanis 42'		Soufi 81'

Hiroshima Big Arch, Hiroshima
Attendance: 21,000
Referee: Hossein Khoshkhan (Iran)

31 October 1992
13:00

Saudi Arabia	1–1	Qatar
Al-Muwallid 86'		Mustafa 74'

Hiroshima Stadium, Hiroshima
Attendance: 4,000
Referee: Neji Jouini (Tunisia)
31 October 1992
15:00

China	0–0	Thailand

Hiroshima Stadium, Hiroshima
Attendance: 5,000
Referee: Noh Byung-Il (South Korea)

2 November 1992
17:00

Saudi Arabia	4–0	Thailand
Al-Owairan 4'; Al-Bishi 19', 72'; Al-Thunayan 64'

Bingo Sports Park, Onomichi
Attendance: 4,000
Referee: Ali Bujsaim (United Arab Emirates)
2 November 1992
19:00

Qatar	1–2	China
Al-Sulaiti 20'		Peng Weiguo 44', 58'

Bingo Sports Park, Onomichi
Attendance: 4,200
Referee: Badara Sène (Senegal)

== Semi-finals ==
Japan defeated China and Saudi Arabia defeated the United Arab Emirates to advance to the final.

6 November 1992
16:30

Japan	3–2	China
Fukuda 48'; Kitazawa 57'; Nakayama 84'		Xie Yuxin 1'; Li Xiao 70'

Hiroshima Stadium, Hiroshima
Attendance: 15,000
Referee: Hossein Khoshkhan (Iran)

6 November 1992
19:00

Saudi Arabia	2–0	United Arab Emirates
Al-Owairan 77'; Al-Bishi 80'

Hiroshima Stadium, Hiroshima
Attendance: 12,000
Referee: Rasheed Al-Jassas (Kuwait)

== Third-place play-off ==
After a 1–1 draw, China defeated the United Arab Emirates 4–3 on penalties to finish third.

8 November 1992
12:00

China	1–1 (a.e.t.)	United Arab Emirates
Hao Haidong 15'		Ismail 10'
Penalties
Fan Zhiyi (penalty missed); Cai Sheng (penalty scored); Wu Qunli (penalty scored); Peng Weiguo (penalty scored); Fu Yubin (penalty scored)	4–3	(penalty missed) Al-Talyani; (penalty missed) Ismaïl

Hiroshima Big Arch, Hiroshima
Attendance: 40,000
Referee: Neji Jouini (Tunisia)

== Final ==
Takuya Takagi scored the only goal of the game as Japan defeated Saudi Arabia to win the tournament.

8 November 1992
14:30

Japan	1–0	Saudi Arabia
Takagi 36'

Hiroshima Big Arch, Hiroshima
Attendance: 60,000
Referee: Jamal Al Sharif (Syria)

== Goalscorers ==
There were 31 goals scored in 16 matches, for an average of 1.94 goals per match.

3 goals

- (Saudi Arabia) Fahad Al-Bishi

2 goals

- (China) Peng Weiguo
- (Japan) Masashi Nakayama
- (North Korea) Kim Kwang-min
- (Saudi Arabia) Saeed Al-Owairan
- (Saudi Arabia) Yousuf Al-Thunayan

1 goal

- (China) Xie Yuxin
- (China) Li Bing
- (China) Li Xiao
- (China) Hao Haidong
- (Iran) Sirous Ghayeghran
- (Iran) Farshad Pious
- (Japan) Kazuyoshi Miura
- (Japan) Masahiro Fukuda
- (Japan) Tsuyoshi Kitazawa
- (Japan) Takuya Takagi
- (Qatar) Mubarak Mustafa
- (Qatar) Khalifa Al-Sulaiti
- (Qatar) Mahmoud Soufi
- (Saudi Arabia) Khalid Al-Muwallid
- (Thailand) Thanis Areesngarkul
- (United Arab Emirates) Khalid Ismail
- (United Arab Emirates) Khamees Saad Mubarak
- (United Arab Emirates) Zuhair Bakhit
