= Ali Bujsaim =

Emirati football referee (born 1959)

- Full name: Ali Mohamed Bujsaim
- Born: September 9, 1959 (age 67); Dubai, United Arab Emirates

International
Years	League	Role
1994–2002	FIFA-listed	Referee

Ali Mohamed Bujsaim (Arabic: علي بوجسيم, born September 9, 1959, in Dubai) is a retired association football referee from the United Arab Emirates, who is best known for supervising matches at three FIFA World Cups: 1994 (two matches), 1998 (three matches) and 2002 (two matches).

In 2002, he was a referee in the Argentina-Sweden match, he gave a red card to Claudio Caniggia for cursing at him, making Caniggia the first player in World Cup history to be sent off while still at the bench.

Preceded by AFC Asian Cup Final 1996 (Malaysia) Mohd. Nazri Abdullah	AFC Asian Cup Final Referees; 2000 (United Arab Emirates) Ali Bujsaim	Succeeded by AFC Asian Cup Final 2004 (Kuwait) Saad Kamil Al-Fadhli
