= Saudi Arabia at the FIFA World Cup =

International football delegation

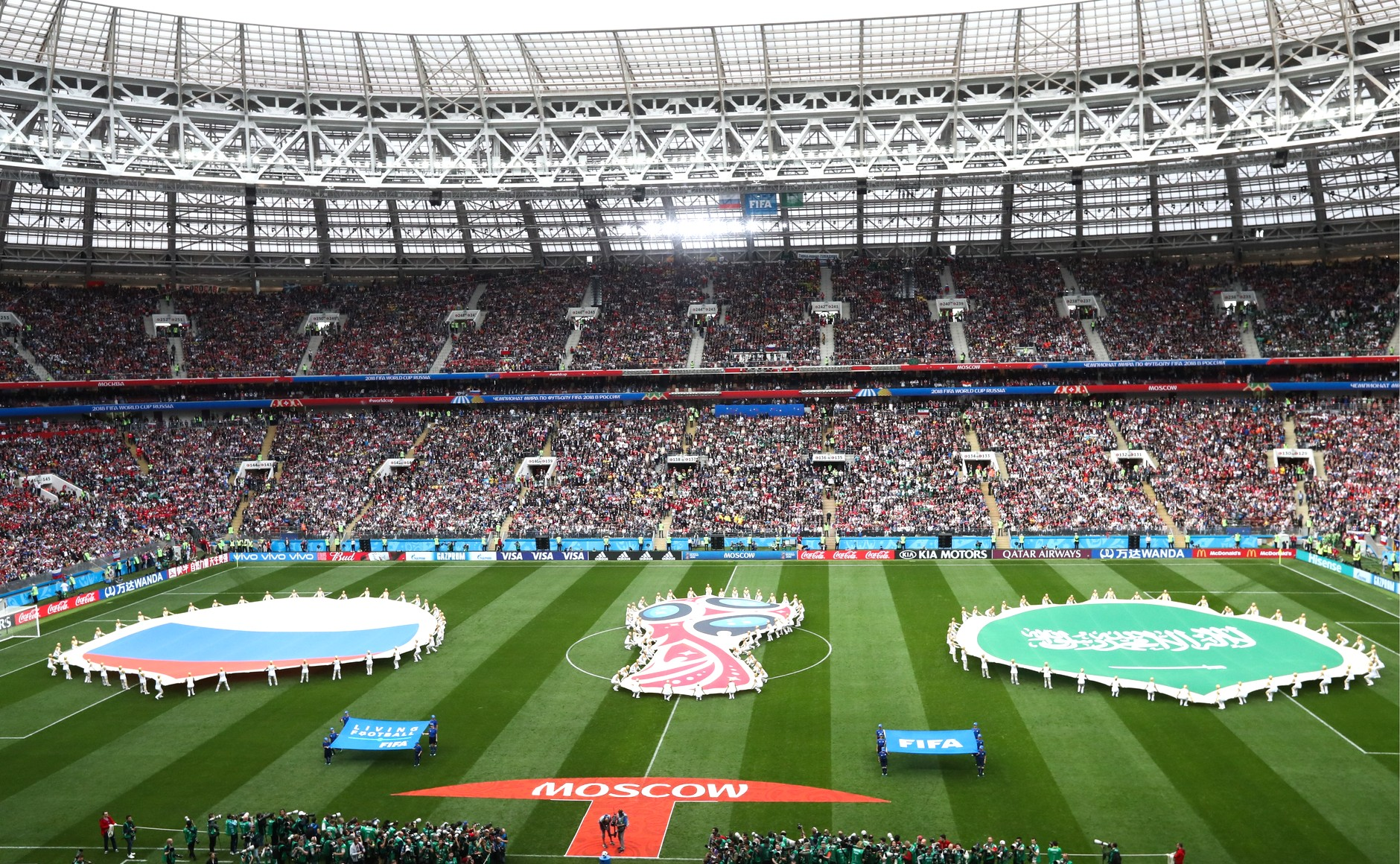
Russia vs Saudi Arabia match at the 2018 FIFA World Cup in Russia

This is a record of Saudi Arabia's results at the FIFA World Cup. The FIFA World Cup, sometimes called the Football World Cup or the Soccer World Cup, but usually referred to simply as the World Cup, is an international association football competition contested by the men's national teams of the members of Fédération Internationale de Football Association (FIFA), the sport's global governing body. The championship has been awarded every four years since the first tournament in 1930, except in 1942 and 1946, due to World War II.

The tournament consists of two parts, the qualification phase and the final phase (officially called the World Cup Finals). The qualification phase, which currently take place over the three years preceding the Finals, is used to determine which teams qualify for the Finals. The current format of the Finals involves 48 teams competing for the title, at venues within the host nation (or nations) over a period of about a month. The World Cup final is the most widely viewed sporting event in the world, with an estimated 715.1 million people watching the 2006 tournament final.

Saudi Arabia has qualified for a total of seven World Cup tournaments, having played in 1994, 1998, 2002, 2006, 2018, 2022, 2026, and automatically qualified for 2034 as hosts. Their best performance was in 1994, where they reached the round of 16.

== Overall record ==
FIFA World Cup record									FIFA World Cup qualification record					
Year	Round	Position	Pld	W	D*	L	GF	GA	Pld	W	D	L	GF	GA
(Uruguay) 1930	Not a FIFA member								Not a FIFA member					
(Italy) 1934	Not a FIFA member								Not a FIFA member					
(France) 1938	Not a FIFA member								Not a FIFA member					
(Brazil) 1950	Not a FIFA member								Not a FIFA member					
(Switzerland) 1954	Not a FIFA member								Not a FIFA member					
(Sweden) 1958	Did not enter								Did not enter					
(Chile) 1962	Did not enter								Did not enter					
(England) 1966	Did not enter								Did not enter					
(Mexico) 1970	Did not enter								Did not enter					
(West Germany) 1974	Did not enter								Did not enter					
(Argentina) 1978	Did not qualify								4	1	0	3	3	7
(Spain) 1982	Did not qualify								10	4	1	5	9	16
(Mexico) 1986	Did not qualify								2	0	1	1	0	1
(Italy) 1990	Did not qualify								9	4	3	2	11	9
(United States) 1994	Round of 16	12th	4	2	0	2	5	6	11	6	5	0	28	7
(France) 1998	Group stage	28th	3	0	1	2	2	7	14	9	3	2	26	7
(South Korea) (Japan) 2002	Group stage	32nd	3	0	0	3	0	12	14	11	2	1	47	8
(Germany) 2006	Group stage	28th	3	0	1	2	2	7	12	10	2	0	24	2
(South Africa) 2010	Did not qualify								16	8	5	3	25	15
(Brazil) 2014	Did not qualify								8	3	3	2	14	7
(Russia) 2018	Group stage	26th	3	1	0	2	2	7	18	12	3	3	45	14
(Qatar) 2022	Group stage	25th	3	1	0	2	3	5	18	13	4	1	34	10
(Canada) (Mexico) (United States) 2026	Group stage	38th	3	0	2	1	1	5	18	8	6	4	22	13
(Morocco) (Portugal) (Spain) 2030	To be determined								To be determined					
(Saudi Arabia) 2034	Qualified as hosts								Qualified as hosts					
Total	Round of 16	7/18	22	4	4	14	15	49	154	89	38	27	288	116

== Historical performances ==
Saudi Arabia made their World Cup debut in 1994, reaching the round of 16 on their first appearance. They advanced from the group with wins over Morocco and Belgium, the latter settled by a Saeed Al-Owairan solo goal that is often ranked among the greatest in World Cup history and earned him the nickname "Maradona of the Arabs". The run, which made them only the second Asian side to clear the group stage at a World Cup, ended with a 3–1 loss to Sweden.

The team failed to win a match across the 1998, 2002 and 2006 tournaments, a run that included a 0–8 defeat by Germany in 2002. At the 2018 World Cup they lost the opening game 5–0 to hosts Russia but closed their campaign with a stoppage-time Salem Al-Dawsari goal to beat Egypt 2–1.

At the 2022 World Cup Saudi Arabia beat eventual champions Argentina 2–1 in their opening match, with Al-Dawsari scoring the winner under coach Hervé Renard, in one of the competition's biggest upsets. It was the country's first win in an opening World Cup match, though they again exited at the group stage. Renard later guided the team to a third consecutive finals in 2026, and Saudi Arabia was confirmed as the sole-bidder host of the 2034 World Cup.

== List of matches ==
World Cup	Round	Opponent	Score	Result	Venue	Saudi Arabia scorers
1994	Group stage	Netherlands	1–2	L	Washington	Anwar
1994	Group stage	Morocco	2–1	W	East Rutherford	Al-Jaber, Anwar
1994	Group stage	Belgium	1–0	W	Washington	Al-Owairan
1994	Round of 16	Sweden	1–3	L	Dallas	Al-Ghesheyan
1998	Group stage	Denmark	0–1	L	Lens	—
1998	Group stage	France	0–4	L	Saint-Denis	—
1998	Group stage	South Africa	2–2	D	Bordeaux	Al-Jaber, Al-Thunayan
2002	Group stage	Germany	0–8	L	Sapporo	—
2002	Group stage	Cameroon	0–1	L	Saitama	—
2002	Group stage	Republic of Ireland	0–3	L	Yokohama	—
2006	Group stage	Tunisia	2–2	D	Munich	Al-Qahtani, Al-Jaber
2006	Group stage	Ukraine	0–4	L	Hamburg	—
2006	Group stage	Spain	0–1	L	Kaiserslautern	—
2018	Group stage	Russia	0–5	L	Moscow	—
2018	Group stage	Uruguay	0–1	L	Rostov-on-Don	—
2018	Group stage	Egypt	2–1	W	Volgograd	Al-Faraj, S. Al-Dawsari
2022	Group stage	Argentina	2–1	W	Lusail	Al-Shehri, S. Al-Dawsari
2022	Group stage	Poland	0–2	L	Al Rayyan	—
2022	Group stage	Mexico	1–2	L	Lusail	S. Al-Dawsari
2026	Group stage	Uruguay	1–1	D	Miami Gardens	Al-Amri
2026	Group stage	Spain	0–4	L	Atlanta	—
2026	Group stage	Cape Verde	0–0	D	Houston	—

=== 1994 FIFA World Cup ===
==== Group Stage ====
Pos	Team	Pld	W	D	L	GF	GA	GD	Pts	Qualification
1	Netherlands	3	2	0	1	4	3	+1	6 (Note: Head-to-head result: Netherlands 2–1 Saudi Arabia.)	Advance to knockout stage
2	Saudi Arabia	3	2	0	1	4	3	+1	6	Advance to knockout stage
3	Belgium	3	2	0	1	2	1	+1	6	Advance to knockout stage
4	Morocco	3	0	0	3	2	5	−3	0	

Source: FIFA
Notes:
June 20, 1994
7:30 p.m. EDT

Netherlands	2–1	Saudi Arabia
Jonk 50'; Taument 86'		Anwar 18'

RFK Stadium, Washington, D.C.
Attendance: 50,535
Referee: Manuel Díaz Vega (Spain)

June 25, 1994
12:30 p.m. EDT

Saudi Arabia	2–1	Morocco
Al-Jaber 7' (pen.); Anwar 45'		Chaouch 26'

Giants Stadium, East Rutherford
Attendance: 76,322
Referee: Philip Don (England)

June 29, 1994
12:30 p.m. EDT

Belgium	0–1	Saudi Arabia
		Al-Owairan 5'

RFK Stadium, Washington, D.C.
Attendance: 52,959
Referee: Hellmut Krug (Germany)

==== Knockout stage ====
Round of 16

July 3, 1994
12:00 p.m. CDT (UTC–5)

Saudi Arabia	1–3	Sweden
Al-Ghesheyan 85'		Dahlin 6'; K. Andersson 51', 88'

Cotton Bowl, Dallas
Attendance: 60,277
Referee: Renato Marsiglia (Brazil)

=== 1998 FIFA World Cup ===
==== Group Stage ====
Pos	Team	Pld	W	D	L	GF	GA	GD	Pts	Qualification
1	France (H)	3	3	0	0	9	1	+8	9	Advance to knockout stage
2	Denmark	3	1	1	1	3	3	0	4	Advance to knockout stage
3	South Africa	3	0	2	1	3	6	−3	2	
4	Saudi Arabia	3	0	1	2	2	7	−5	1	

Source: FIFA
(H) Hosts
12 June 1998
17:30 CEST (UTC+2)

Saudi Arabia	0–1	Denmark
		Rieper 69'

Stade Félix-Bollaert, Lens
Attendance: 38,100
Referee: Javier Castrilli (Argentina)

18 June 1998
21:00 CEST (UTC+2)

France	4–0	Saudi Arabia
Henry 37', 78'; Trezeguet 68'; Lizarazu 85'

Stade de France, Saint-Denis
Attendance: 80,000
Referee: Arturo Brizio Carter (Mexico)

24 June 1998
16:00 CEST (UTC+2)

South Africa	2–2	Saudi Arabia
Bartlett 18', 90+3' (pen.)		Al-Jaber 45+2' (pen.); Al-Thunayan 74' (pen.)

Parc Lescure, Bordeaux
Attendance: 31,800
Referee: Mario Sánchez (Chile)

=== 2006 FIFA World Cup ===
==== Group Stage ====
Pos	Team	Pld	W	D	L	GF	GA	GD	Pts	Qualification
1	Spain	3	3	0	0	8	1	+7	9	Advance to knockout stage
2	Ukraine	3	2	0	1	5	4	+1	6	Advance to knockout stage
3	Tunisia	3	0	1	2	3	6	−3	1	
4	Saudi Arabia	3	0	1	2	2	7	−5	1	

Source: FIFA
14 June 2006
18:00

Tunisia	2–2	Saudi Arabia
Jaziri 23'; Jaïdi 90+2'		Al-Qahtani 57'; Al-Jaber 84'

Allianz Arena, Munich
Attendance: 66,000
Referee: Mark Shield (Australia)

19 June 2006
18:00

Saudi Arabia	0–4	Ukraine
		Rusol 4'; Rebrov 36'; Shevchenko 46'; Kalynychenko 84'

Volksparkstadion, Hamburg
Attendance: 50,000
Referee: Graham Poll (England)

23 June 2006
16:00

Saudi Arabia	0–1	Spain
		Juanito 36'

Fritz-Walter-Stadion, Kaiserslautern
Attendance: 46,000
Referee: Coffi Codjia (Benin)

=== 2018 FIFA World Cup ===
==== Group Stage ====
Pos	Team	Pld	W	D	L	GF	GA	GD	Pts	Qualification
1	Uruguay	3	3	0	0	5	0	+5	9	Advance to knockout stage
2	Russia (H)	3	2	0	1	8	4	+4	6	Advance to knockout stage
3	Saudi Arabia	3	1	0	2	2	7	−5	3	
4	Egypt	3	0	0	3	2	6	−4	0	

Source: FIFA
(H) Hosts
14 June 2018
18:00 MSK (UTC+3)

Russia	5–0	Saudi Arabia
Gazinsky 12'; Cheryshev 43', 90+1'; Dzyuba 71'; Golovin 90+4'

Luzhniki Stadium, Moscow
Attendance: 78,011
Referee: Néstor Pitana (Argentina)

20 June 2018
18:00 MSK (UTC+3)

Uruguay	1–0	Saudi Arabia
Suárez 23'

Rostov Arena, Rostov-on-Don
Attendance: 42,678
Referee: Clément Turpin (France)

25 June 2018
17:00 MSK (UTC+3)

Saudi Arabia	2–1	Egypt
Al-Faraj 45+6' (pen.); Al-Dawsari 90+5'		Salah 22'

Volgograd Arena, Volgograd
Attendance: 36,823
Referee: Wilmar Roldán (Colombia)

=== 2022 FIFA World Cup ===
==== Group Stage ====
Pos	Team	Pld	W	D	L	GF	GA	GD	Pts	Qualification
1	Argentina	3	2	0	1	5	2	+3	6	Advance to knockout stage
2	Poland	3	1	1	1	2	2	0	4	Advance to knockout stage
3	Mexico	3	1	1	1	2	3	−1	4	
4	Saudi Arabia	3	1	0	2	3	5	−2	3	

Source: FIFA
Rules for classification: Group stage tiebreakers
22 November 2022
13:00

Argentina	1–2	Saudi Arabia
Messi 10' (pen.)		Al-Shehri 48'; S. Al-Dawsari 53'

Lusail Stadium, Lusail
Attendance: 88,012
Referee: Slavko Vinčić (Slovenia)

26 November 2022
16:00

Poland	2–0	Saudi Arabia
Zieliński 39'; Lewandowski 82'

Education City Stadium, Al Rayyan
Attendance: 44,259
Referee: Wilton Sampaio (Brazil)

30 November 2022
22:00

Saudi Arabia	1–2	Mexico
S. Al-Dawsari 90+5'		Martín 47'; Chávez 52'

Lusail Stadium, Lusail
Attendance: 84,985
Referee: Michael Oliver (England)

=== 2026 FIFA World Cup ===
==== Group Stage ====
Pos	Team	Pld	W	D	L	GF	GA	GD	Pts	Qualification
1	Spain	3	2	1	0	5	0	+5	7	Advance to knockout stage
2	Cape Verde	3	0	3	0	2	2	0	3	Advance to knockout stage
3	Uruguay	3	0	2	1	3	4	−1	2 (Note: Tied on head-to-head result (Saudi Arabia 1–1 Uruguay). Overall goal difference was used as the tiebreaker.)	
4	Saudi Arabia	3	0	2	1	1	5	−4	2	

Source: FIFA
Rules for classification: Group stage tiebreakers
Notes:
June 15, 2026
6:00 p.m. UTC−4

Saudi Arabia	1–1	Uruguay
Al-Amri 41'	(Note: "Saudi Arabia vs Uruguay | First Stage | FIFA World Cup 2026". FIFA. Retrieved June 15, 2026.; "Match Report – Group H – Saudi Arabia v. Uruguay". FIFA. Retrieved June 15, 2026.; "Post match summary report – Group H – Saudi Arabia v. Uruguay". FIFA. June 15, 2026. Retrieved June 17, 2026.)	M. Araújo 80'

Hard Rock Stadium, Miami Gardens
Attendance: 62,764
Referee: Maurizio Mariani (Italy)

June 21, 2026
12:00 p.m. UTC−4

Spain	4–0	Saudi Arabia
Yamal 10'; Oyarzabal 21', 24'; Al-Tambakti 49' (o.g.)	(Note: "Spain vs Saudi Arabia | First Stage | FIFA World Cup 2026". FIFA. Retrieved June 21, 2026.; "Match Report – Group H – Spain v. Saudi Arabia". FIFA. June 21, 2026. Retrieved June 21, 2026.; "Post match summary report – Group H – Spain v. Saudi Arabia". FIFA. June 22, 2026. Retrieved June 22, 2026.)

Mercedes-Benz Stadium, Atlanta
Attendance: 68,239
Referee: Raphael Claus (Brazil)

June 26, 2026
7:00 p.m. UTC−5

Cape Verde	0–0	Saudi Arabia
	(Note: "Cabo Verde vs Saudi Arabia | First Stage | FIFA World Cup 2026". FIFA. Retrieved June 27, 2026.; "Match Report – Group H – Cabo Verde v. Saudi Arabia". FIFA. June 27, 2026. Retrieved June 27, 2026.; "Post match summary report – Group H – Cabo Verde v. Saudi Arabia". FIFA. June 27, 2026. Retrieved June 27, 2026.)

NRG Stadium, Houston
Attendance: 68,278
Referee: François Letexier (France)

== Head-to-head record ==
Opponent	Pld	W	D	L	GF	GA	GD	Win %
Argentina	1	1	0	0	2	1	+1	100.00
Belgium	1	1	0	0	1	0	+1	100.00
Cameroon	1	0	0	1	0	1	−1	0.00
Cape Verde	1	0	1	0	0	0	+0	0.00
Denmark	1	0	0	1	0	1	−1	0.00
Egypt	1	1	0	0	2	1	+1	100.00
France	1	0	0	1	0	4	−4	0.00
Germany	1	0	0	1	0	8	−8	0.00
Mexico	1	0	0	1	1	2	−1	0.00
Morocco	1	1	0	0	2	1	+1	100.00
Netherlands	1	0	0	1	1	2	−1	0.00
Poland	1	0	0	1	0	2	−2	0.00
Republic of Ireland	1	0	0	1	0	3	−3	0.00
Russia	1	0	0	1	0	5	−5	0.00
South Africa	1	0	1	0	2	2	+0	0.00
Spain	2	0	0	2	0	5	−5	0.00
Sweden	1	0	0	1	1	3	−2	0.00
Tunisia	1	0	1	0	2	2	+0	0.00
Ukraine	1	0	0	1	0	4	−4	0.00
Uruguay	2	0	1	1	1	2	−1	0.00
Total	21	4	3	14	15	49	−34	19.05

== Player records ==
=== Most appearances ===
Rank	Player	Matches	World Cups
1	Mohamed Al-Deayea	10	1994, 1998 and 2002
2	Sami Al-Jaber	9	1994, 1998, 2002 and 2006
2	Abdullah Zubromawi	9	1994, 1998 and 2002
2	Hussein Abdulghani	9	1998, 2002 and 2006
2	Salem Al-Dawsari	9	2018, 2022 and 2026
6	Mohammed Al-Owais	7	2018, 2022 and 2026
6	Mohamed Kanno	7	2018, 2022 and 2026
8	Mohammed Al-Khilaiwi	6	1994 and 1998
8	Khaled Al-Muwallid	6	1994 and 1998
8	Saeed Al-Owairan	6	1994 and 1998
8	Fuad Anwar	6	1994 and 1998
8	Hamzah Saleh	6	1994 and 1998
8	Ahmed Al-Dokhi	6	1998, 2002 and 2006
8	Ibrahim Suwayed	6	1998 and 2002
8	Nawaf Al-Temyat	6	1998, 2002 and 2006
8	Redha Tukar	6	2002 and 2006
8	Saud Abdulhamid	6	2022 and 2026
8	Abdulelah Al-Amri	6	2022 and 2026
8	Firas Al-Buraikan	6	2022 and 2026

=== Goalscorers ===
Sami Al-Jaber scored a joint-record three goals for Saudi Arabia at the FIFA World Cup; he also managed to score in World Cups twelve years apart (1994 and 2006).

Player	Goals	1994	1998	2006	2018	2022	2026
Sami Al-Jaber	3	1	1	1			
Salem Al-Dawsari	3				1	2	
Fuad Anwar Amin	2	2					
Saeed Al-Owairan	1	1					
Fahad Al-Ghesheyan	1	1					
Yousuf Al-Thunayan	1		1				
Yasser Al-Qahtani	1			1			
Salman Al-Faraj	1				1		
Saleh Al-Shehri	1					1	
Abdulelah Al-Amri	1						1
Total	15	5	2	2	2	3	1

== See also ==
- Asian nations at the FIFA World Cup
- Saudi Arabia at the AFC Asian Cup
- Saudi Arabia at the CONCACAF Gold Cup
