= Saudi Arabia at the CONCACAF Gold Cup =

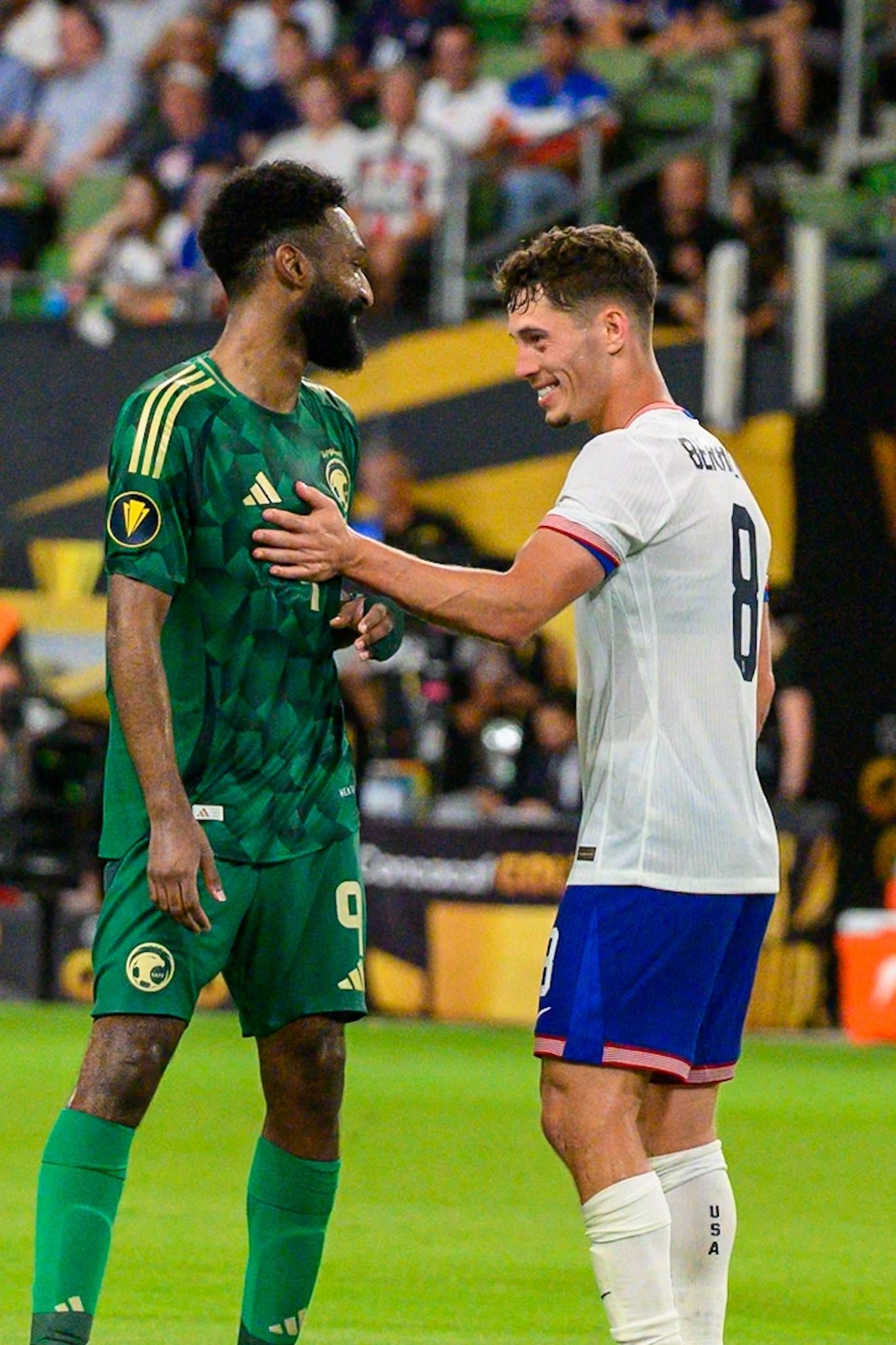
Firas Al-Buraikan with American midfielder Sebastian Berhalter during Saudi Arabia's 1–0 loss to the United States on 19 June 2025.

The CONCACAF Gold Cup is a major association football tournament in the Americas, generally featuring teams from North America, Central America, and the Caribbean. Between 1963 and 1989, the tournament was known as the CONCACAF Championship. Though it is a regional tournament, nations from other federations have been invited as guests for select editions of the tournament.

Saudi Arabia is a member of the Asian Football Confederation (AFC), and regularly competes in the AFC Asian Cup. On 19 December 2024, the Saudi Arabia national team announced that it would compete in both the 2025 and 2027 CONCACAF Gold Cups, only eight days after the country was awarded the hosting rights for the 2034 FIFA World Cup. They became the eighth guest country to compete at the CONCACAF Gold Cup, and the third from Asia, after South Korea in 2000 and 2002, and Qatar in 2021 and 2023.

In the 2025 CONCACAF Gold Cup, they were drawn into Group D alongside hosts the United States, Trinidad and Tobago, and Haiti. The team beat Haiti 1–0 in their opening match, thanks to a penalty scored by Saleh Al-Shehri. After that victory, they continued the first round with an 1–0 loss to the United States and a 1–1 draw with Trinidad and Tobago. In the quarter-finals, they were drawn against defending champions Mexico in Arizona, where they lost 2–0, thanks to a goal from Alexis Vega and an own goal by Abdullah Madu.

The 2027 CONCACAF Gold Cup, it is unclear whether they will compete due to the 2026 Iran war.

== Overview ==
CONCACAF Gold Cup record
| Year | Round | Pos. | Pld | W | D | L | GF | GA |
|---|---|---|---|---|---|---|---|---|
| (Canada) (United States) 2025 | Quarter-finals | 8th | 4 | 1 | 1 | 2 | 2 | 4 |
| 2027 | Invited | | | | | | | |
| Total | Quarter-finals | 2/29 | 4 | 1 | 1 | 2 | 2 | 4 |

== 2025 CONCACAF Gold Cup ==
=== Squad ===
Saudi Arabia's 60-man provisional squad list was announced by CONCACAF on May 19, 2025, with the final 25-man squad being announced on June 5, 2025, 10 days before their opening match.

=== Group stage ===
| Pos | Team | Pld | W | D | L | GF | GA | GD | Pts | Qualification |
|---|---|---|---|---|---|---|---|---|---|---|
| 1 | United States (H) | 3 | 3 | 0 | 0 | 8 | 1 | +7 | 9 | Advance to knockout stage |
| 2 | Saudi Arabia | 3 | 1 | 1 | 1 | 2 | 2 | 0 | 4 | Advance to knockout stage |
| 3 | Trinidad and Tobago | 3 | 0 | 2 | 1 | 2 | 7 | −5 | 2 | |
| 4 | Haiti | 3 | 0 | 1 | 2 | 2 | 4 | −2 | 1 | |

Source: CONCACAF
Rules for classification: Tiebreakers
(H) Co-host
June 15, 2025
20:15 (17:15 UTC−7)

| Haiti | 0–1 | Saudi Arabia |
|---|---|---|
| | Report | Al-Shehri 21' (pen.) |

Snapdragon Stadium, San Diego
Attendance: 7,736
Referee: Walter López (Guatemala)
June 19, 2025
21:15 (20:15 UTC−5)

| Saudi Arabia | 0–1 | United States |
|---|---|---|
| | Report | Richards 63' |

Q2 Stadium, Austin
Attendance: 11,727
Referee: Marco Ortíz (Mexico)
June 22, 2025
19:00 (16:00 UTC−7)

| Saudi Arabia | 1–1 | Trinidad and Tobago |
|---|---|---|
| Al-Buraikan 60' | Report | Sealy 10' |

Allegiant Stadium, Paradise
Attendance: 35,000
Referee: Keylor Herrera (Costa Rica)

=== Quarter-finals ===
June 28, 2025
22:15 (19:15 UTC−7)

| Mexico | 2–0 | Saudi Arabia |
|---|---|---|
| Vega 49'; Madu 81' (o.g.) | Report |

State Farm Stadium, Glendale
Attendance: 45,255
Referee: Lukasz Szpala (United States)

== Overall head-to-head record ==
| Opponent | Pld | W | D | L | GF | GA | GD | Win % |
|---|---|---|---|---|---|---|---|---|
| Haiti | 1 | 1 | 0 | 0 | 1 | 0 | +1 | 100.00 |
| Mexico | 1 | 0 | 0 | 1 | 0 | 2 | −2 | 0.00 |
| Trinidad and Tobago | 1 | 0 | 1 | 0 | 1 | 1 | +0 | 0.00 |
| United States | 1 | 0 | 0 | 1 | 0 | 1 | −1 | 0.00 |
| Total | 4 | 1 | 1 | 2 | 2 | 4 | −2 | 25.00 |

== Controversy ==
The decision to announce Saudi Arabia as guests for 2025 and 2027 came four months after CONCACAF announced an investment deal with the Public Investment Fund (PIF), Saudi Arabia's sovereign wealth fund. The Human Rights Watch—citing the country's murder of journalists and the repression of both women's rights and human rights activists—described the deal as sportswashing. Though CONCACAF frequently invited guest countries in the late 1990s and early 2000s, Qatar's invitation to compete in 2021, before its 2022 FIFA World Cup, was the first in 16 years. In addition to the investments of the PIF, Saudi Arabia's invitation coincided with Saudi Aramco becoming the tournament's primary energy sponsor.

== See also ==
- Saudi Arabia at the FIFA World Cup
- Saudi Arabia at the AFC Asian Cup
