= Jeddah Derby =

Football rivalry in Saudi Arabia

- Native name: ديربي جدة (derbi jeddah)
- Location: Jeddah, Saudi Arabia
- Teams: Al-Ahli; Al-Ittihad
- First meeting: Al-Ahli 0–0 Al-Ittihad; Friendly (1951)
- Latest meeting: Al-Ahli 3–1 Al-Ittihad; Saudi Pro League (6 March 2026)
- Stadiums: Al-Sabban Stadium (1950–1976); Al-Faisal Stadium (1970–2012, 2021–present); King Abdullah Sports City (2014–present)

Statistics
- Total meetings: Official matches: 189; Unofficial matches: 15; Total matches: 204
- Most wins: Official matches: Al-Ahli (72); Unofficial matches: Al-Ittihad (7); Total matches: Al-Ahli (76)
- Top scorer: Saeed Ghurab (20)
- Largest victory: Al-Ittihad 8–2 Al-Ahli; Regional League (24 October 1966)

Al-Ahli	Al-Ittihad

The Jeddah Derby also known as the Red Sea Derby (Arabic: ديربي جدة, romanized: derbi jeddah), is the football matches contested between Al-Ahli and Al-Ittihad, both from Jeddah, Saudi Arabia. For more than 70 years, it used to be the longest running top-flight derby in Saudi Arabian football. The rivalry started in 1951 and is considered to be one of the strongest and most viewed matches in Asia and the Arab world. The rivalry was halted when Al-Ahli were relegated in 2022 to the 2022–23 Saudi First Division League for the first time in their history.

== History ==
The first-ever match between these two teams was in 1951. The two teams played a friendly match in Al-Saban Stadium in Jeddah which ended 0–0. In 1958, both teams met each other in the final of the Crown Prince Cup in what would be the first final between these two teams. Over 12,000 fans attended the match at the Al-Saban Stadium in Jeddah. Al-Ittihad defeated Al-Ahli 3–2 to lift their first Crown Prince Cup trophy. The first league match between the two sides was during the first season of the Saudi League, the 1976–77 season. Al-Ahli won the match 2–0 thanks to goals from Saad Al-Harbi and Idris Adam. Saeed Ghorab is the top goal-scorer of the derby with 20 goals, 17 for Al-Ittihad and 3 for Al-Ahli. The clubs have met each other in 12 finals, with Al-Ittihad winning 7 and Al-Ahli winning 5.

== Official match results ==
As of August 3, 2026. Source:

Dates are in dd/mm/yyyy form.

- SF = Semi-finals
- QF = Quarter-finals
- R16 = Round of 16
- R32 = Round of 32
- GS = Group stage
- R1 = Round 1
- R2 = Round 2

Al-Ahli win Draw Al-Ittihad win

Season	Competition	Date	Home team	Result	Away team
1957	King Cup	25-10-1957	Al-Ahli	2–2	Al-Ittihad
1957	King Cup	20-12-1957	Al-Ittihad	2–1	Al-Ahli
1958	Crown Prince Cup	27-04-1958	Al-Ahli	2–1	Al-Ittihad
1958	King Cup	04-09-1958	Al-Ittihad	4–1	Al-Ahli
1958	Crown Prince Cup	22-09-1958	Al-Ittihad	3–2	Al-Ahli
1958	King Cup	12-12-1958	Al-Ahli	3–2	Al-Ittihad
1959	King Cup	22-08-1959	Al-Ittihad	2–0	Al-Ahli
1960	King Cup	02-05-1960	Al-Ittihad	7–0	Al-Ahli
1960	King Cup	25-11-1960	Al-Ahli	0–2	Al-Ittihad
1961	King Cup	06-10-1961	Al-Ahli	1–0	Al-Ittihad
1962	King Cup	12-10-1962	Al-Ahli	1–1	Al-Ittihad
1962	King Cup	15-12-1962	Al-Ittihad	1–2	Al-Ahli
1963	King Cup	07-10-1963	Al-Ittihad	1–1	Al-Ahli
1963	King Cup	27-12-1963	Al-Ahli	1–1	Al-Ittihad
1964	Crown Prince Cup	31-03-1964	Al-Ittihad	3–0	Al-Ahli
1964	King Cup	17-05-1964	Al-Ittihad	3–2	Al-Ahli
1965	King Cup	01-01-1965	Al-Ahli	1–1	Al-Ittihad
1965	King Cup	13-11-1965	Al-Ahli	5–1	Al-Ittihad
1966	Crown Prince Cup SF	13-03-1966	Al-Ittihad	4–3	Al-Ahli
1966	Regional League	03-09-1966	Al-Ahli	1–3	Al-Ittihad
1966	Regional League	24-10-1966	Al-Ittihad	8–2	Al-Ahli
1967	Regional League	18-09-1967	Al-Ahli	3–1	Al-Ittihad
1968	Regional League	27-03-1968	Al-Ittihad	1–2	Al-Ahli
1968	King Cup	04-09-1968	Al-Ahli	2–0	Al-Ittihad
1968	Regional League	15-10-1968	Al-Ahli	4–3	Al-Ittihad
1969	Regional League	04-04-1969	Al-Ittihad	0–1	Al-Ahli
1969	Regional League	18-10-1969	Al-Ahli	4–0	Al-Ittihad
1970	King Cup	24-01-1970	Al-Ittihad	1–3	Al-Ahli
1970	King Cup	20-08-1970	Al-Ahli	2–0	Al-Ittihad
1970	Crown Prince Cup	25-09-1970	Al-Ahli	3–2	Al-Ittihad
1971	King Cup	15-01-1971	Al-Ittihad	1–1	Al-Ahli
1971	King Cup	30-07-1971	Al-Ahli	3–1	Al-Ittihad
1971	King Cup	24-09-1971	Al-Ahli	0–0	Al-Ittihad
1972	King Cup	29-09-1972	Al-Ahli	3–1	Al-Ittihad
1972	King Cup	23-12-1972	Al-Ittihad	2–1	Al-Ahli
1973	Crown Prince Cup	03-07-1973	Al-Ahli	4–0	Al-Ittihad
1973	King Cup	09-11-1973	Al-Ittihad	2–0	Al-Ahli
1974	King Cup	19-01-1974	Al-Ittihad	0–0	Al-Ahli
1974	Crown Prince Cup	29-01-1974	Al-Ahli	1–0	Al-Ittihad
1975–76	King Cup SF	28-05-1976	Al-Ahli	5–0	Al-Ittihad
1976–77	League	21-01-1977	Al-Ahli	2–0	Al-Ittihad
1976–77	League	25-03-1977	Al-Ittihad	0–0	Al-Ahli
1976–77	King Cup SF	17-05-1977	Al-Ahli	4–2	Al-Ittihad
1977–78	League	31-12-1977	Al-Ittihad	2–2	Al-Ahli
1977–78	League	16-03-1978	Al-Ahli	2–0	Al-Ittihad
1978–79	League	30-12-1978	Al-Ittihad	3–1	Al-Ahli
1978–79	League	28-04-1979	Al-Ahli	2–2	Al-Ittihad
1978–79	King Cup Final	08-06-1979	Al-Ahli	4–0	Al-Ittihad
1979–80	League	18-01-1980	Al-Ahli	0–0	Al-Ittihad
1979–80	League	09-04-1980	Al-Ittihad	0–1	Al-Ahli
1980–81	League	27-11-1980	Al-Ittihad	0–0	Al-Ahli
1980–81	League	06-02-1981	Al-Ahli	2–1	Al-Ittihad
1981–82	League	28-11-1981	Al-Ahli	2–2	Al-Ittihad
1981–82	League	12-01-1982	Al-Ittihad	0–0	Al-Ahli
1982–83	League	10-02-1983	Al-Ittihad	1–1	Al-Ahli
1982–83	League	10-04-1983	Al-Ahli	5–2	Al-Ittihad
1983–84	League	05-10-1983	Al-Ittihad	0–2	Al-Ahli
1983–84	League	10-12-1983	Al-Ahli	1–1	Al-Ittihad
1983–84	King Cup SF	14-04-1984	Al-Ahli	1–0	Al-Ittihad
1984–85	League	10-11-1984	Al-Ittihad	1–2	Al-Ahli
1984–85	King Cup QF	11-02-1985	Al-Ahli	1–0	Al-Ittihad
1984–85	League	08-03-1985	Al-Ahli	2–0	Al-Ittihad
1985–86	Federation Cup GS	07-02-1986	Al-Ittihad	1–0	Al-Ahli
1985–86	Federation Cup GS	27-02-1986	Al-Ahli	1–1	Al-Ittihad
1986–87	Federation Cup GS	13-09-1986	Al-Ittihad	1–1	Al-Ahli
1986–87	Federation Cup GS	27-09-1986	Al-Ittihad	0–0	Al-Ahli
1986–87	League	16-12-1986	Al-Ittihad	1–0	Al-Ahli
1986–87	League	11-02-1987	Al-Ahli	2–1	Al-Ittihad
1986–87	King Cup R16	27-02-1987	Al-Ittihad	0–0 ^{1}	Al-Ahli
1987–88	League	05-10-1987	Al-Ahli	4–4	Al-Ittihad
1987–88	Federation Cup GS	13-11-1987	Al-Ahli	0–1	Al-Ittihad
1987–88	Federation Cup GS	24-11-1987	Al-Ittihad	0–0	Al-Ahli
1987–88	League	06-12-1987	Al-Ahli	1–1	Al-Ittihad
1988–89	League	28-09-1988	Al-Ittihad	2–1	Al-Ahli
1988–89	Federation Cup GS	04-11-1988	Al-Ahli	2–1	Al-Ittihad
1988–89	Federation Cup GS	17-11-1988	Al-Ittihad	0–0	Al-Ahli
1988–89	League	10-01-1989	Al-Ahli	2–2	Al-Ittihad
1989–90	Federation Cup GS	05-10-1989	Al-Ittihad	0–3	Al-Ahli
1989–90	Federation Cup GS	16-10-1989	Al-Ahli	1–0	Al-Ittihad
1989–90	League	02-12-1989	Al-Ittihad	0–2	Al-Ahli
1989–90	League	02-03-1990	Al-Ahli	1–0	Al-Ittihad
1990–91	Federation Cup GS	20-09-1990	Al-Ahli	0–0	Al-Ittihad
1990–91	Federation Cup GS	05-10-1990	Al-Ittihad	0–0	Al-Ahli
1990–91	League	07-12-1990	Al-Ittihad	2–0	Al-Ahli
1990–91	League	24-05-1991	Al-Ahli	0–1	Al-Ittihad
1991–92	League	16-11-1991	Al-Ahli	3–2	Al-Ittihad
1991–92	League	08-02-1992	Al-Ittihad	1–0	Al-Ahli
1992–93	Federation Cup GS	29-10-1992	Al-Ahli	2–2	Al-Ittihad
1992–93	Federation Cup GS	03-12-1992	Al-Ittihad	0–3	Al-Ahli
1992–93	League	02-02-1993	Al-Ahli	1–0	Al-Ittihad
1992–93	League	12-03-1993	Al-Ittihad	0–1	Al-Ahli
1993–94	Federation Cup GS	21-09-1993	Al-Ahli	1–1	Al-Ittihad
1993–94	Federation Cup GS	08-10-1993	Al-Ittihad	3–0	Al-Ahli
1993–94	League	25-12-1993	Al-Ittihad	1–0	Al-Ahli
1993–94	League	21-02-1994	Al-Ahli	1–1	Al-Ittihad
1994–95	League	10-01-1995	Al-Ittihad	2–0	Al-Ahli
1994–95	League	03-02-1995	Al-Ahli	1–1	Al-Ittihad

Season	Competition	Date	Home team	Result	Away team
1995–96	League	25-11-1995	Al-Ahli	2–1	Al-Ittihad
1995–96	League	24-02-1996	Al-Ittihad	2–2	Al-Ahli
1996–97	Federation Cup Final	09-12-1996	Al-Ittihad	3–1	Al-Ahli
1996–97	League	20-12-1996	Al-Ahli	1–1	Al-Ittihad
1996–97	League	21-02-1997	Al-Ittihad	4–1	Al-Ahli
1997–98	Federation Cup GS	04-09-1997	Al-Ittihad	1–0	Al-Ahli
1997–98	Federation Cup GS	15-09-1997	Al-Ahli	3–2	Al-Ittihad
1997–98	League	22-12-1997	Al-Ittihad	2–2	Al-Ahli
1997–98	League	01-02-1998	Al-Ahli	1–0	Al-Ittihad
1998–99	Federation Cup GS	21-09-1998	Al-Ittihad	2–1	Al-Ahli
1998–99	Federation Cup GS	01-11-1998	Al-Ahli	1–3	Al-Ittihad
1998–99	League	13-12-1998	Al-Ittihad	1–3	Al-Ahli
1998–99	League	26-02-1999	Al-Ahli	1–1	Al-Ittihad
1998–99	League Final	07-05-1999	Al-Ittihad	1–0	Al-Ahli
1999–2000	Founder's Cup SF	09-11-1999	Al-Ittihad	1–1	Al-Ahli
1999–2000	Founder's Cup SF	16-12-1999	Al-Ahli	3–2	Al-Ittihad
1999–2000	League	23-12-1999	Al-Ittihad	1–1	Al-Ahli
1999–2000	League	08-03-2000	Al-Ahli	2–4	Al-Ittihad
1999–2000	Crown Prince Cup QF	09-04-2000	Al-Ahli	1–2	Al-Ittihad
1999–2000	League Final	17-05-2000	Al-Ittihad	2–1	Al-Ahli
2000–01	League	22-02-2001	Al-Ahli	1–1	Al-Ittihad
2000–01	League	05-04-2001	Al-Ittihad	1–3	Al-Ahli
2000–01	League SF	18-04-2001	Al-Ahli	0–0	Al-Ittihad
2000–01	League SF	25-04-2001	Al-Ittihad	4–2	Al-Ahli
2001–02	League	23-10-2001	Al-Ahli	1–2	Al-Ittihad
2001–02	League	08-04-2002	Al-Ittihad	4–1	Al-Ahli
2001–02	Crown Prince Cup Final	24-04-2002	Al-Ahli	2–1	Al-Ittihad
2002–03	Federation Cup GS	09-09-2002	Al-Ittihad	2–2	Al-Ahli
2002–03	Federation Cup GS	03-10-2002	Al-Ahli	0–2	Al-Ittihad
2002–03	League	01-01-2003	Al-Ahli	1–4	Al-Ittihad
2002–03	League	23-04-2003	Al-Ittihad	0–1	Al-Ahli
2002–03	League Final	28-05-2003	Al-Ittihad	3–2	Al-Ahli
2003–04	League	11-11-2003	Al-Ahli	1–1	Al-Ittihad
2003–04	Crown Prince Cup Final	26-03-2004	Al-Ittihad	1–0	Al-Ahli
2003–04	Arab Champions League GS	30-04-2004	Al-Ittihad	2–3	Al-Ahli
2003–04	League	11-05-2004	Al-Ittihad	3–3	Al-Ahli
2003–04	Arab Champions League GS	01-06-2004	Al-Ahli	1–1	Al-Ittihad
2004–05	League	26-09-2004	Al-Ahli	2–4	Al-Ittihad
2004–05	League	26-02-2005	Al-Ittihad	3–2	Al-Ahli
2005–06	Crown Prince Cup QF	01-01-2006	Al-Ittihad	1–1 ^{2}	Al-Ahli
2005–06	League	05-03-2006	Al-Ittihad	2–2	Al-Ahli
2005–06	League	23-03-2006	Al-Ahli	1–1	Al-Ittihad
2005–06	League Final	12-04-2006	Al-Ittihad	3–0	Al-Ahli
2006–07	Federation Cup Final	09-02-2007	Al-Ittihad	0–3	Al-Ahli
2006–07	League	22-03-2007	Al-Ittihad	3–0	Al-Ahli
2006–07	Crown Prince Cup Final	27-04-2007	Al-Ittihad	1–2	Al-Ahli
2006–07	League	04-05-2007	Al-Ahli	1–1	Al-Ittihad
2007–08	League	25-10-2007	Al-Ahli	0–2	Al-Ittihad
2007–08	League	18-01-2008	Al-Ittihad	1–0	Al-Ahli
2007–08	Federation Cup GS	22-01-2008	Al-Ittihad	2–1	Al-Ahli
2007–08	Federation Cup GS	08-03-2008	Al-Ahli	2–1	Al-Ittihad
2008–09	Pro League	17-10-2008	Al-Ahli	1–2	Al-Ittihad
2008–09	Federation Cup GS	31-12-2008	Al-Ahli	0–1	Al-Ittihad
2008–09	Federation Cup GS	15-01-2009	Al-Ittihad	1–0	Al-Ahli
2008–09	Pro League	24-01-2009	Al-Ittihad	0–1	Al-Ahli
2009–10	Federation Cup GS	08-09-2009	Al-Ahli	2–1	Al-Ittihad
2009–10	Federation Cup GS	15-11-2009	Al-Ittihad	1–2	Al-Ahli
2009–10	Pro League	05-12-2009	Al-Ittihad	2–1	Al-Ahli
2009–10	Pro League	14-03-2010	Al-Ahli	0–1	Al-Ittihad
2010–11	Pro League	16-09-2010	Al-Ahli	1–3	Al-Ittihad
2010–11	Pro League	24-02-2011	Al-Ittihad	2–0	Al-Ahli
2010–11	King Cup Final	24-06-2011	Al-Ittihad	0–0 ^{3}	Al-Ahli
2011–12	Pro League	01-12-2011	Al-Ittihad	1–3	Al-Ahli
2011–12	Pro League	29-03-2012	Al-Ahli	0–1	Al-Ittihad
2012–13	AFC Champions League SF	22-10-2012	Al-Ittihad	1–0	Al-Ahli
2012–13	AFC Champions League SF	31-10-2012	Al-Ahli	2–0	Al-Ittihad
2012–13	Pro League	30-11-2012	Al-Ittihad	1–3	Al-Ahli
2012–13	Pro League	14-02-2013	Al-Ahli	1–1	Al-Ittihad
2013–14	Pro League	04-10-2013	Al-Ittihad	0–0	Al-Ahli
2013–14	Pro League	24-01-2014	Al-Ahli	2–1	Al-Ittihad
2013–14	King Cup SF	19-04-2014	Al-Ahli	2–1	Al-Ittihad
2013–14	King Cup SF	27-04-2014	Al-Ittihad	2–3	Al-Ahli
2014–15	Pro League	19-12-2014	Al-Ahli	1–1	Al-Ittihad
2014–15	Pro League	15-05-2015	Al-Ittihad	1–1	Al-Ahli
2015–16	Pro League	22-11-2015	Al-Ittihad	0–3	Al-Ahli
2015–16	Crown Prince Cup SF	31-12-2015	Al-Ittihad	0–1	Al-Ahli
2015–16	Pro League	02-04-2016	Al-Ahli	4–2	Al-Ittihad
2016–17	Pro League	23-09-2016	Al-Ahli	1–1	Al-Ittihad
2016–17	Crown Prince Cup SF	27-12-2016	Al-Ittihad	3–2	Al-Ahli
2016–17	Pro League	03-02-2017	Al-Ittihad	1–4	Al-Ahli
2017–18	Pro League	10-21-2017	Al-Ahli	3–0	Al-Ittihad
2017–18	Pro League	04-02-2018	Al-Ittihad	0–0	Al-Ahli
2018–19	Pro League	25-11-2018	Al-Ittihad	1–3	Al-Ahli
2018–19	Pro League	01-03-2019	Al-Ahli	1–1	Al-Ittihad
2019–20	Pro League	31-10-2019	Al-Ahli	2–1	Al-Ittihad
2019–20	Pro League	09-08-2020	Al-Ittihad	1–2	Al-Ahli
2020–21	Pro League	31-10-2020	Al-Ittihad	2–0	Al-Ahli
2020–21	Pro League	11-02-2021	Al-Ahli	1–1	Al-Ittihad
2021–22	Pro League	01-10-2021	Al-Ittihad	2–0	Al-Ahli
2021–22	Pro League	26-02-2022	Al-Ahli	3–4	Al-Ittihad
2023–24	Pro League	06-10-2023	Al-Ittihad	0–1	Al-Ahli
2023–24	Pro League	01-04-2024	Al-Ahli	1–0	Al-Ittihad
2024–25	Pro League	31-10-2024	Al-Ittihad	1–0	Al-Ahli
2024–25	Pro League	05-04-2025	Al-Ahli	2-2	Al-Ittihad
2025–26	Pro League	08-11-2025	Al Ittihad	0-1	Al-Ahli
2025–26	Pro League	06-03-2026	Al-Ahli	3-1	Al-Ittihad
2026–27	Pro League	26-11-2026	Al Ittihad	-	Al-Ahli
2026–27	Pro League	21-05-2027	Al-Ahli	-	Al-Ittihad

^{1} 1987 King Cup Second Round match won 4–3 on penalties by Al-Ittihad after both teams were tied 0–0.
^{2} 2005–06 Crown Prince Cup quarter-final won 4–2 on penalties by Al-Ahli after both teams were tied 1–1.
^{3} 2011 King Cup Final won 4–2 on penalties by Al-Ahli after both teams were tied 0–0.

== Records ==
=== Most goals in a match ===
- 10 goals on 24 October 1966 Al-Ittihad 8–2 Al-Ahli
- 5 goals on 22 September 1958 Al-Ahli 2–3 Al-Ittihad
- 7 goals on 2 May 1960 Al-Ittihad 7–0 Al-Ahli
- 7 goals on 15 October 1968 Al-Ahli 4–3 Al-Ittihad
- 7 goals on 10 April 1983 Al-Ahli 5–2 Al-Ittihad
- 7 goals on 26 February 2022 Al-Ittihad 4–3 Al-Ahli

=== Al-Ahli biggest wins ===
* Four or more goals difference, OR Al-Ahli scored five or above

- Al-Ahli 5-0 Al-Ittihad on 13 November 1965
- Al-Ahli 4-0 Al-Ittihad on 18 October 1969
- Al-Ahli 5–1 Al-Ittihad on 3 July 1973
- Al-Ahli 5–0 Al-Ittihad on 28 May 1976
- Al-Ahli 4–1 Al-Ittihad on 8 June 1979
- Al-Ahli 5–2 Al-Ittihad on 10 April 1983

=== Al-Ittihad biggest wins ===
* Four or more goals difference, OR Al-Ittihad scored five or above

- Al-Ittihad 7–0 Al-Ahli on 2 May 1960
- Al-Ittihad 8–2 Al-Ahli on 24 October 1966

=== Highest Attendance ===
* 45,000 or above

- 59,026 – Al-Ahli 1–1 Al-Ittihad (19 December 2014) (King Abdullah Sports City)
- 55,764 – Al-Ittihad 0–1 Al-Ahli (6 October 2023) (King Abdullah Sports City)
- 54,256 – Al-Ittihad 0–1 Al-Ahli (31 December 2015) (King Abdullah Sports City)
- 52,909 – Al-Ittihad 1–4 Al-Ahli (3 February 2017) (King Abdullah Sports City)
- 50,633 – Al-Ahli 1–0 Al-Ittihad (1 April 2024) (King Abdullah Sports City)
- 49,732 – Al-Ahli 1–1 Al-Ittihad (23 September 2019) (King Abdullah Sports City)
- 47,223 – Al-Ittihad 3–2 Al-Ahli (27 December 2016) (King Abdullah Sports City)
- 46,977 – Al-Ittihad 0–3 Al-Ahli (22 November 2015) (King Abdullah Sports City)
- 46,527 – Al-Ittihad 1–3 Al-Ahli (25 November 2018) (King Abdullah Sports City)
- 45,913 – Al-Ittihad 0–0 Al-Ahli (4 February 2018) (King Abdullah Sports City)
- 45,000 – Al-Ittihad 2–1 Al-Ahli (17 May 2000) (Prince Abdullah Al Faisal Stadium)

== Statistics ==
Statistics as of 1 April 2024.

	Matches	Al-Ahli Wins	Draws	Al-Ittihad Wins	Al-Ahli Goals	Al-Ittihad Goals
Regional League	7	5	0	2	17	16
Saudi League	99	32	34	33	133	135
Total league matches	106	37	34	35	150	151
King Cup	34	16	10	8	55	43
Crown Prince Cup	14	7	1	6	24	22
Federation Cup	30	9	10	11	32	33
Founder's Cup	2	1	1	0	4	3
Asian Champions League	2	1	0	1	2	1
Arab Champions League	2	1	1	0	4	3
Total official matches	189	72	57	60	271	256
Al-Maseef Tournament	3	1	0	2	5	6
Prince Abdullah Al-Faisal Tournament	3	0	1	2	2	4
Friendlies	9	3	4	3	15	20
Total matches	204	76	62	67	293	286

=== Top scorers ===
Below is the list of players who have scored at least four goals in official meetings.

Position	Name	Team	Goals
1	(Saudi Arabia) Saeed Ghorab	Al-Ittihad (17) Al-Ahli (3)	20
2	(Saudi Arabia) Hussam Abo Dawood	Al-Ahli	14
2	(Saudi Arabia) Talal Al-Meshal	Al-Ahli (12) Al-Ittihad (2)	14
4	(Saudi Arabia) Soulaiman Matar	Al-Ahli	13
4	(Brazil) Sérgio Ricardo	Al-Ittihad (10) Al-Ahli (3)	13
4	(Syria) Omar Al Somah	Al-Ahli	13
7	(Saudi Arabia) Hamzah Idris	Al-Ittihad	10
7	(Saudi Arabia) Mohammed Noor	Al-Ittihad	10
9	(Saudi Arabia) Amin Dabo	Al-Ahli	9
9	(Saudi Arabia) Salah Al-Muwallad	Al-Ittihad	9

== Players who played for both clubs ==
Al-Ahli then Al-Ittihad

- 1960: (Saudi Arabia) Turki Bafarrat
- 1963: (Saudi Arabia) Mubarak Abo Ghanam
- 1963: (Saudi Arabia) Saleh Kadour
- 1963: (Saudi Arabia) Abdulraouf Labbad
- 1979: (Saudi Arabia) Saeed Ghurab
- 1985: (Saudi Arabia) Mousa Marzouq
- 2000: (Saudi Arabia) Khaled Masaad
- 2001: (Saudi Arabia) Haitham Al-Johani
- 2001: (Brazil) Sérgio Ricardo (via Al-Hilal)
- 2002: (Saudi Arabia) Hussain Al-Qoozi
- 2003: (Saudi Arabia) Abdullah Al-Waked
- 2004: (Saudi Arabia) Ibrahim Al-Shahrani
- 2004: (Saudi Arabia) Khaled Gahwji
- 2005: (Saudi Arabia) Tisir Al-Antaif (via Al-Khaleej)
- 2008: (Saudi Arabia) Talal Al-Meshal (via Al-Nassr, then Al-Markhiya)
- 2011: (Saudi Arabia) Ibrahim Hazzazi
- 2015: (Saudi Arabia) Majed Al-Khaibari (via Najran)
- 2016: (Saudi Arabia) Ahmed Al-Aoufi
- 2018: (Saudi Arabia) Mansoor Al-Harbi
- 2019: (Saudi Arabia) Hamdan Al-Shamrani (via Al-Faisaly)
- 2022: (Saudi Arabia) Abdullah Al-Jadaani (via Al-Hilal)
- 2023: (Saudi Arabia) Saleh Al-Amri (via Al-Ettifaq, then Al-Wehda, then Abha)
- 2023: (Saudi Arabia) Abdullah Al-Mayouf (via Al-Hilal)
- 2024: (Saudi Arabia) Saleh Al-Shehri (via Al Raed, then Al Hilal)
- 2025: (Saudi Arabia) Adnan Al-Bishri

Al-Ittihad then Al-Ahli

- 1957: (Saudi Arabia) Abdulaziz Hussam Aldin
- 1959: (Saudi Arabia) Abdulrahman Katlooj
- 1960: (Saudi Arabia) Ibrahim Ashmawi
- 1962: (Saudi Arabia) Ahmed Hammad
- 1962: (Saudi Arabia) Ghazi Nasser
- 1964: (Saudi Arabia) Mohammed Omar Rajkhan
- 1970: (Saudi Arabia) Saeed Ghurab (via Al-Nassr)
- 1972: (Saudi Arabia) Adel Rawas
- 1999: (Saudi Arabia) Salem Suwaid
- 2003: (Saudi Arabia) Mohammed Al-Khilaiwi (via Al-Arabi)
- 2015: (Saudi Arabia) Majed Kanabah
- 2016: (Brazil) Marquinho (via Udinese)
- 2016: (Saudi Arabia) Abdulfattah Asiri
- 2019: (Saudi Arabia) Sultan Mendash (via Al-Faisaly)
- 2020: (Saudi Arabia) Talal Al-Absi (via Al-Taawoun)
- 2023: (Saudi Arabia) Abdullah Al-Ammar (via Damac)
- 2025: (Saudi Arabia) Zakaria Hawsawi (via Al Raed)
