= John Beaton =

Scottish Referee

- Born: 9 January 1982 (age 44); Glasgow, United Kingdom

Domestic
Years	League	Role
2001–	Scottish Football Association	Referee
2009–2013	SFL / SPL	Referee

International
Years	League	Role
2012–	FIFA listed	Referee

John Beaton (born 9 January 1982) is a Scottish football referee who officiates in the Scottish Professional Football League. He has been a FIFA listed referee since 2012.

== Career ==
=== Football ===
John Beaton became a referee in 2001 and was admitted to the SFA senior list in 2005 before becoming a Category 1 referee in 2009.

He has refereed at the UEFA U17 Championship Qualifying Tournament in 2009 and the Scottish Junior Cup Final. He refereed two games at UEFA u19 Elite Round in Serbia in May 2012. His first Europa League match appointment was 5 July 2012 Elsborg v Floriana.

In March 2010, he was stuck overnight, along with the Queen's Park team, in snow gates overnight on the A9 in Scotland after he refereed an Elgin City match.

Beaton became a FIFA referee in 2012. He appeared as a fourth official in the 2014 World Cup qualifier between Romania and the Netherlands.

In May 2015, Beaton refereed the Riyadh derby between Al Hilal and Al Nassr in the Saudi Professional League, where Salem Al-Dawsari motioned to head-butt him after a decision did not go his way. Around the same time, Beaton attracted media attention with photos surfacing that appeared to show him drinking alcohol in a Rangers pub after a match.

In May 2026, Beaton attracted controversy after awarding Celtic a late stoppage-time penalty against Motherwell during the penultimate match of the Scottish Premiership season. The decision proved significant in Celtic's title challenge with Hearts, allowing them to remain one point behind heading into the final day of the campaign. Following the match, Beaton reportedly received threats and was placed under police protection. A 19-year-old man was later arrested after the referee's personal details were allegedly shared online.

=== Non football ===
Outside of football, Beaton started his career as a journalist before becoming communications officer for Strathclyde Police. He is currently media relations manager at ScotRail Alliance, having previously been a communications officer for the University of Strathclyde.
