= Riyadh derby =

Football rivalry in Saudi Arabia

- Native name: ديربي الرياض (derbi al-riyad)
- Other names: Capital Derby
- Location: Riyadh, Saudi Arabia
- Teams: Al-Hilal SFC; Al-Nassr FC
- First meeting: Al-Nassr 1–0 Al-Hilal; Friendly (1958)
- Latest meeting: Al-Hilal 3–1 Al-Nassr 2025–26 Saudi Pro League (12 January 2026)
- Next meeting: Al-Nassr vs Al-Hilal
- Stadiums: Kingdom Arena (Al-Hilal); Al-Awwal Park (Al-Nassr)

Statistics
- Total meetings: Official matches: 176; Unofficial matches: 14; Total matches: 190
- Most wins: Official matches: Al-Hilal (72)
- Top scorer: Majed Abdullah (21)
- Largest victory: Al-Hilal 5–1 Al-Nassr; Pro League (4 May 2017)

The Riyadh Derby (Arabic: ديربي الرياض, romanized: derbi al-riyad), also known as Capital Derby (Arabic: ديربي العاصمة, romanized: derbi al-easima), is a local derby contested between the Saudi's two Riyadh-based clubs, Al-Hilal and Al-Nassr.

== Official match results ==
As of 13 May 2025. Source:

Dates are in dd/mm/yyyy form.

- SF = Semi-finals
- QF = Quarter-finals
- R16 = Round of 16
- R32 = Round of 32
- GS = Group stage
- R1 = Round 1
- R2 = Round 2
- PO = Play-offs

Al-Hilal win Draw Al-Nassr win

Season	Competition	Date	Home team	Result	Away team
1964	King Cup	11-09-1964	Al-Nassr	1–1	Al-Hilal
1964	King Cup	20-11-1964	Al-Hilal	1–0	Al-Nassr
1964	Crown Prince Cup	25-12-1964	Al-Hilal	3–0	Al-Nassr
1965	King Cup	26-11-1965	Al-Hilal	4–2	Al-Nassr
1966	Regional League	15-09-1966	Al-Nassr	2–2	Al-Hilal
1966	Regional League	28-10-1966	Al-Hilal	3–3	Al-Nassr
1967	King Cup	17-01-1967	Al-Hilal	3–0	Al-Nassr
1967	Regional League	22-09-1967	Al-Nassr	2–1	Al-Hilal
1967	King Cup	30-10-1967	Al-Nassr	3–1	Al-Hilal
1968	Regional League	11-04-1968	Al-Hilal	0–3	Al-Nassr
1968	Regional League	31-10-1968	Al-Nassr	1–0	Al-Hilal
1969	King Cup	24-01-1969	Al-Hilal	2–0	Al-Nassr
1969	Regional League	04-04-1969	Al-Hilal	1–2	Al-Nassr
1969	Regional League	19-09-1969	Al-Nassr	4–1	Al-Hilal
1970	Regional League	23-07-1970	Al-Nassr	4–2	Al-Hilal
1970	Regional League	27-08-1970	Al-Hilal	3–2	Al-Nassr
1971	Regional League	25-08-1971	Al-Nassr	2–0	Al-Hilal
1971	Regional League	23-09-1971	Al-Hilal	0–3	Al-Nassr
1972	Regional League	28-09-1972	Al-Nassr	2–1	Al-Hilal
1972	Regional League	29-12-1972	Al-Hilal	1–2	Al-Nassr
1973	Regional League	06-12-1973	Al-Hilal	3–1	Al-Nassr
1973	Crown Prince Cup	10-12-1973	Al-Nassr	3–2 (a.e.t.)	Al-Hilal
1974	Regional League	28-01-1974	Al-Nassr	2–0	Al-Hilal
1974–75	Categorization League Final	14-03-1975	Al-Nassr	3–1	Al-Hilal
1975–76	King Cup SF	28-05-1976	Al-Nassr	0–0 (Note: Al-Nassr won 4–2 on penalties after both teams tied 0–0.)	Al-Hilal
1976–77	Premier League	25-02-1977	Al-Hilal	3–3	Al-Nassr
1976–77	Premier League	29-04-1977	Al-Nassr	1–1	Al-Hilal
1976–77	King Cup SF	16-05-1977	Al-Hilal	2–0	Al-Nassr
1977–78	Premier League	29-12-1977	Al-Hilal	0–2	Al-Nassr
1977–78	Premier League	17-03-1978	Al-Nassr	2–1	Al-Hilal
1978–79	Premier League	28-12-1978	Al-Nassr	2–2	Al-Hilal
1978–79	Premier League	26-04-1979	Al-Hilal	1–0	Al-Nassr
1979–80	Premier League	17-01-1980	Al-Nassr	2–2	Al-Hilal
1979–80	Premier League	10-04-1980	Al-Hilal	0–2	Al-Nassr
1980–81	Premier League	28-11-1980	Al-Hilal	3–2	Al-Nassr
1980–81	Premier League	06-02-1981	Al-Nassr	2–2	Al-Hilal
1980–81	King Cup Final	14-05-1981	Al-Nassr	3–1	Al-Hilal
1981–82	Premier League Third Place PO	04-02-1982	Al-Hilal	3–1	Al-Nassr
1982–83	Premier League	11-02-1983	Al-Nassr	1–2	Al-Hilal
1982–83	Premier League	08-04-1983	Al-Hilal	1–2	Al-Nassr
1983–84	Premier League	25-11-1983	Al-Nassr	0–0	Al-Hilal
1983–84	Premier League	03-02-1984	Al-Hilal	0–2	Al-Nassr
1984–85	Premier League	16-11-1984	Al-Nassr	0–2	Al-Hilal
1984–85	Premier League	08-03-1985	Al-Hilal	1–0	Al-Nassr
1985–86	Premier League	07-11-1985	Al-Hilal	0–1	Al-Nassr
1985–86	Premier League	26-11-1985	Al-Nassr	2–1	Al-Hilal
1985–86	Premier League	09-12-1985	Al-Nassr	1–2	Al-Hilal
1985–86	Premier League	03-01-1986	Al-Hilal	1–0	Al-Nassr
1986–87	Federation Cup GS	07-09-1986	Al-Hilal	0–0	Al-Nassr
1986–87	Federation Cup GS	21-09-1986	Al-Nassr	0–1	Al-Hilal
1986–87	Premier League	16-01-1987	Al-Nassr	0–1	Al-Hilal
1986–87	Premier League	27-02-1987	Al-Hilal	0–1	Al-Nassr
1986–87	King Cup Final	13-03-1987	Al-Hilal	0–1	Al-Nassr
1987–88	Premier League	25-09-1987	Al-Nassr	1–0	Al-Hilal
1987–88	Federation Cup GS	14-11-1987	Al-Hilal	1–0	Al-Nassr
1987–88	Federation Cup GS	24-11-1987	Al-Nassr	0–0	Al-Hilal
1987–88	Premier League	28-12-1987	Al-Hilal	2–1	Al-Nassr
1987–88	King Cup R16	01-04-1988	Al-Nassr	1–0	Al-Hilal
1988–89	Premier League	04-10-1988	Al-Hilal	2–2	Al-Nassr
1988–89	Federation Cup GS	03-11-1988	Al-Nassr	1–2	Al-Hilal
1988–89	Federation Cup GS	17-11-1988	Al-Hilal	4–4	Al-Nassr
1988–89	Premier League	13-01-1989	Al-Nassr	2–1	Al-Hilal
1988–89	King Cup Final	22-05-1989	Al-Hilal	3–0	Al-Nassr
1989–90	Federation Cup GS	18-09-1989	Al-Hilal	2–1	Al-Nassr
1989–90	Federation Cup GS	06-10-1989	Al-Nassr	1–1	Al-Hilal
1989–90	Premier League	07-12-1989	Al-Nassr	0–1	Al-Hilal
1989–90	Premier League	15-03-1990	Al-Hilal	0–0	Al-Nassr
1990–91	Federation Cup GS	18-09-1990	Al-Hilal	0–1	Al-Nassr
1990–91	Federation Cup GS	01-10-1990	Al-Nassr	1–0	Al-Hilal
1990–91	Premier League	21-12-1990	Al-Hilal	0–0	Al-Nassr
1990–91	Premier League	04-06-1991	Al-Nassr	2–1	Al-Hilal
1991–92	Premier League	16-03-1992	Al-Nassr	1–1	Al-Hilal
1991–92	Premier League	29-04-1992	Al-Hilal	1–2	Al-Nassr
1992–93	Premier League	15-02-1993	Al-Nassr	2–3	Al-Hilal
1992–93	Premier League	21-05-1993	Al-Hilal	4–1	Al-Nassr
1993–94	Federation Cup SF	26-10-1993	Al-Nassr	1–0	Al-Hilal
1993–94	Premier League	19-11-1993	Al-Hilal	3–0	Al-Nassr
1993–94	Premier League	21-01-1994	Al-Nassr	1–1	Al-Hilal
1993–94	Premier League SF	21-04-1994	Al-Hilal	0–1	Al-Nassr
1994–95	Federation Cup GS	17-10-1994	Al-Nassr	4–4	Al-Hilal
1994–95	Federation Cup GS	07-11-1994	Al-Hilal	1–2	Al-Nassr
1994–95	Premier League	19-01-1995	Al-Hilal	1–2	Al-Nassr
1994–95	Premier League	07-04-1995	Al-Nassr	1–1	Al-Hilal
1994–95	Premier League Final	09-06-1995	Al-Hilal	1–3	Al-Nassr
1995–96	Arab Club Champions Cup SF	11-12-1995	Al-Hilal	0–0 (Note: Al-Hilal won 4–2 on penalties after both teams tied 0–0.)	Al-Nassr
1995–96	Premier League	23-01-1996	Al-Hilal	3–2	Al-Nassr
1995–96	Premier League	12-04-1996	Al-Nassr	2–2	Al-Hilal
1996–97	Premier League	11-01-1997	Al-Nassr	0–2	Al-Hilal
1996–97	Premier League	21-03-1997	Al-Hilal	0–3	Al-Nassr
1996–97	Crown Prince Cup R16	25-04-1997	Al-Hilal	2–1	Al-Nassr
1996–97	Premier League SF	23-05-1997	Al-Hilal	2–2	Al-Nassr
1996–97	Premier League SF	30-05-1997	Al-Nassr	1–3	Al-Hilal
1997–98	Federation Cup SF	21-09-1997	Al-Hilal	1–1 (Note: Al-Hilal won 4–2 on penalties after both teams tied 1–1.)	Al-Nassr
1997–98	Premier League	07-11-1997	Al-Hilal	2–0	Al-Nassr
1997–98	Premier League	09-01-1998	Al-Nassr	2–1	Al-Hilal

Season	Competition	Date	Home team	Result	Away team
1998–99	Federation Cup GS	22-09-1998	Al-Hilal	1–2	Al-Nassr
1998–99	Federation Cup GS	13-10-1998	Al-Nassr	0–0	Al-Hilal
1998–99	Premier League	15-12-1998	Al-Nassr	0–2	Al-Hilal
1998–99	Premier League	19-03-1999	Al-Hilal	2–2	Al-Nassr
1999–2000	Founder's Cup SF	08-11-1999	Al-Hilal	0–0	Al-Nassr
1999–2000	Founder's Cup SF	23-11-1999	Al-Nassr	1–2	Al-Hilal
1999–2000	Premier League	08-12-1999	Al-Hilal	0–0	Al-Nassr
1999–2000	Premier League	25-02-2000	Al-Nassr	1–0	Al-Hilal
2000–01	Arab Cup Winners' Cup Final	22-11-2000	Al-Nassr	1–2 (a.e.t.)	Al-Hilal
2000–01	Premier League	04-01-2001	Al-Nassr	1–2	Al-Hilal
2000–01	Premier League	25-01-2001	Al-Hilal	2–2	Al-Nassr
2000–01	Arab Super Cup	04-04-2001	Al-Nassr	1–1	Al-Hilal
2000–01	Premier League SF	19-04-2001	Al-Nassr	1–0	Al-Hilal
2000–01	Premier League SF	26-04-2001	Al-Hilal	0–0	Al-Nassr
2001–02	Premier League	04-12-2001	Al-Hilal	0–0	Al-Nassr
2001–02	Premier League	21-03-2002	Al-Nassr	3–2	Al-Hilal
2002–03	Federation Cup GS	08-09-2002	Al-Hilal	1–1	Al-Nassr
2002–03	Federation Cup GS	02-10-2002	Al-Nassr	2–0	Al-Hilal
2002–03	Premier League	02-01-2003	Al-Hilal	1–1	Al-Nassr
2002–03	Premier League	24-04-2003	Al-Nassr	0–2	Al-Hilal
2003–04	Premier League	10-09-2003	Al-Nassr	1–1	Al-Hilal
2003–04	Premier League	15-01-2004	Al-Hilal	1–2	Al-Nassr
2004–05	Premier League	16-10-2004	Al-Hilal	2–0	Al-Nassr
2004–05	Premier League	05-05-2005	Al-Nassr	1–1	Al-Hilal
2005–06	Federation Cup GS	22-08-2005	Al-Hilal	2–0	Al-Nassr
2005–06	Federation Cup GS	05-09-2005	Al-Nassr	1–0	Al-Hilal
2005–06	Premier League	02-12-2005	Al-Hilal	1–1	Al-Nassr
2005–06	Premier League	03-03-2006	Al-Nassr	1–2	Al-Hilal
2006–07	Premier League	03-12-2006	Al-Hilal	2–1	Al-Nassr
2006–07	Premier League	15-04-2007	Al-Nassr	0–1	Al-Hilal
2007–08	Premier League	06-11-2007	Al-Nassr	1–3	Al-Hilal
2007–08	Premier League	14-12-2007	Al-Hilal	1–1	Al-Nassr
2007–08	Crown Prince Cup R16	08-02-2008	Al-Hilal	2–0	Al-Nassr
2007–08	Federation Cup Final	02-04-2008	Al-Hilal	1–2	Al-Nassr
2008–09	Pro League	18-10-2008	Al-Hilal	2–1	Al-Nassr
2008–09	Pro League	23-01-2009	Al-Nassr	0–2	Al-Hilal
2008–09	Crown Prince Cup SF	23-02-2009	Al-Hilal	1–0	Al-Nassr
2008–09	King Cup QF	17-04-2009	Al-Nassr	1–1	Al-Nassr
2008–09	King Cup QF	26-04-2009	Al-Hilal	0–0	Al-Nassr
2009–10	Pro League	29-09-2009	Al-Hilal	2–2	Al-Nassr
2009–10	Federation Cup GS	11-10-2009	Al-Hilal	2–1	Al-Nassr
2009–10	Federation Cup GS	12-12-2009	Al-Nassr	2–2	Al-Hilal
2009–10	Pro League	31-12-2009	Al-Nassr	2–1	Al-Hilal
2009–10	Crown Prince Cup QF	10-02-2010	Al-Nassr	1–2 (a.e.t.)	Al-Hilal
2009–10	King Cup SF	20-04-2010	Al-Nassr	3–5	Al-Hilal
2009–10	King Cup SF	02-05-2010	Al-Hilal	1–1	Al-Nassr
2010–11	Pro League	24-10-2010	Al-Hilal	1–1	Al-Nassr
2010–11	Crown Prince Cup SF	10-03-2011	Al-Nassr	0–2	Al-Hilal
2010–11	Pro League	24-04-2011	Al-Nassr	0–1	Al-Hilal
2011–12	Pro League	24-11-2011	Al-Nassr	0–3	Al-Hilal
2011–12	Crown Prince Cup QF	23-01-2012	Al-Hilal	4–1	Al-Nassr
2011–12	Pro League	25-03-2012	Al-Hilal	1–0	Al-Nassr
2012–13	Pro League	01-09-2012	Al-Nassr	1–3	Al-Hilal
2012–13	Pro League	30-01-2013	Al-Hilal	0–1	Al-Nassr
2012–13	Crown Prince Cup Final	22-02-2013	Al-Hilal	1–1 (Note: Al-Hilal won 4–2 on penalties after both teams tied 1–1.)	Al-Nassr
2013–14	Pro League	25-11-2013	Al-Hilal	1–2	Al-Nassr
2013–14	Crown Prince Cup Final	01-02-2014	Al-Nassr	2–1	Al-Hilal
2013–14	Pro League	21-02-2014	Al-Nassr	3–4	Al-Hilal
2014–15	Pro League	13-12-2014	Al-Nassr	1–0	Al-Hilal
2014–15	Pro League	10-05-2015	Al-Hilal	0–1	Al-Nassr
2014–15	King Cup Final	05-06-2015	Al-Nassr	1–1 (Note: Al-Hilal won 7–6 on penalties after both teams tied 1–1.)	Al-Hilal
2015–16	Super Cup Final	12-08-2015	Al-Nassr	0–1	Al-Hilal
2015–16	Pro League	24-12-2015	Al-Nassr	1–2	Al-Hilal
2015–16	Pro League	10-03-2016	Al-Hilal	2–0	Al-Nassr
2016–17	Pro League	16-12-2016	Al-Nassr	1–1	Al-Hilal
2016–17	Crown Prince Cup SF	26-12-2016	Al-Hilal	0–2	Al-Nassr
2016–17	King Cup QF	01-04-2017	Al-Nassr	0–2	Al-Hilal
2016–17	Pro League	04-05-2017	Al-Hilal	5–1	Al-Nassr
2017–18	Pro League	26-10-2017	Al-Nassr	1–2	Al-Hilal
2017–18	Pro League	08-02-2018	Al-Hilal	2–2	Al-Nassr
2018–19	Pro League	08-12-2018	Al-Hilal	2–2	Al-Nassr
2018–19	Pro League	29-03-2019	Al-Nassr	3–2	Al-Hilal
2019–20	Pro League	27-10-2019	Al-Hilal	1–2	Al-Nassr
2019–20	Pro League	05-08-2020	Al-Nassr	1–4	Al-Hilal
2020–21	Pro League	23-11-2020	Al-Hilal	2–0	Al-Nassr
2020–21	King Cup Final	28-11-2020	Al-Hilal	2–1	Al-Nassr
2020–21	Super Cup Final	30-01-2021	Al-Hilal	0–3	Al-Nassr
2020–21	Pro League	23-02-2021	Al-Nassr	1–0	Al-Hilal
2021–22	AFC Champions League SF	19-10-2021	Al-Nassr	1–2	Al-Hilal
2021–22	Pro League	16-12-2021	Al-Hilal	0–2	Al-Nassr
2021–22	King Cup QF	21-02-2022	Al-Nassr	1–2	Al-Hilal
2021–22	Pro League	03-03-2022	Al-Nassr	0–4	Al-Hilal
2022–23	Pro League	26-12-2022	Al-Nassr	2–2	Al-Hilal
2022–23	Pro League	18-04-2023	Al-Hilal	2–0	Al-Nassr
2023–24	Arab Club Champions Cup Final	12-08-2023	Al-Hilal	1–2 (a.e.t.)	Al-Nassr
2023–24	Pro League	01-12-2023	Al-Hilal	3–0	Al-Nassr
2023–24	Super Cup SF	08-04-2024	Al-Hilal	2–1	Al-Nassr
2023–24	Pro League	17-05-2024	Al-Nassr	1–1	Al-Hilal
2023–24	King Cup Final	31-05-2024	Al-Hilal	1–1 (Note: Al-Hilal won 5–4 on penalties after both teams tied 1–1.)	Al-Nassr
2024–25	Super Cup Final	17-08-2024	Al-Nassr	1–4	Al-Hilal
2024–25	Pro League	01-11-2024	Al-Nassr	1–1	Al-Hilal
2024–25	Pro League	04-04-2025	Al-Hilal	1–3	Al-Nassr
2025–26	Pro League	12-01-2026	Al-Hilal	3–1	Al-Nassr
2025–26	Pro League	12-05-2026	Al-Nassr	1–1	Al-Hilal

== Statistics ==
Statistics as of 1 November 2024.

	Matches	Al-Hilal Wins	Draws	Al-Nassr Wins	Al-Hilal Goals	Al-Nassr Goals
Regional League	15	2	2	11	18	35
Categorization League	1	0	0	1	1	3
Saudi League	105	42	32	31	155	122
Total league matches	121	44	34	43	174	160
King's Cup	21	10	7	4	33	20
Crown Prince's Cup	11	7	1	3	20	11
Saudi Super Cup	4	3	0	1	3	4
Federation Cup	23	6	9	8	26	28
Founder's Cup	2	1	1	0	2	1
Champions League	1	1	0	0	2	1
Arab Competitions	4	1	2	1	4	4
Total official matches	187	73	54	60	264	229
Al-Bir Cup	1	1	0	0	1	0
Palestine Martyr Cup	1	0	0	1	2	4
Riyadh Season Cup	1	1	0	0	2	0
Friendlies	7	3	2	2	9	8
Total matches	196	77	55	63	277	240

=== Top scorers ===
Below is the list of players who have scored at least seven goals in official meetings.

Position	Name	Team	Goals
1	(Saudi Arabia) Majed Abdullah	Al-Nassr	21
2	(Saudi Arabia) Mohammad Al-Sahlawi	Al-Nassr	17
3	(Saudi Arabia) Mohammad Al-Abdeli	Al-Nassr	15
4	(Saudi Arabia) Salem Al-Dawsari	Al-Hilal	11
5	(Saudi Arabia) Sami Al-Jaber	Al-Hilal	10
6	(Saudi Arabia) Yasser Al-Qahtani	Al-Hilal	9
7	(Saudi Arabia) Ahmed Al-Danini	Al-Nassr	8
7	(Saudi Arabia) Soulaiman Matar	Al-Hilal	8
9	(Saudi Arabia) Hussain Al-Habshi	Al-Hilal	7
9	(Saudi Arabia) Mohammad Al-Shalhoub	Al-Hilal	7
9	(Tunisia) Néjib Limam	Al-Hilal	7
9	(Saudi Arabia) Yousuf Al-Thunayan	Al-Hilal	7

== Records ==
Biggest wins

Al-Hilal 5–1 Al-Nassr	4 May 2017	Pro League
Al-Nassr 4–1 Al-Hilal	19 September 1969	Saudi Regional Leagues
Al-Nassr 0–4 Al-Hilal	3 March 2022	Pro League
Al-Nassr 1–4 Al-Hilal	5 August 2020	Pro League
Al-Hilal 0–3 Al-Nassr	30 January 2021	Super Cup

== Honours ==
Al-Hilal	Competition	Al-Nassr
Domestic
19	Saudi Pro League	9
11	King's Cup	6
13	Crown Prince's Cup (defunct)	3
7	Saudi Federation Cup / Prince Faisal Cup (defunct)	3
1	Saudi Founder's Cup (held every 100 years)	0
5	Saudi Super Cup	2
56	Aggregate	23
Asian
4	Asian Champion Club Tournament/AFC Champions League/AFC Champions League Elite	0
2	Asian Cup Winners' Cup (defunct)	1
2	Asian Super Cup (defunct)	1
8	Aggregate	2
Regional
2	Arab Club Champions Cup	1
1	Arab Cup Winners' Cup (defunct)	0
1	Arab Super Cup (defunct)	0
2	GCC Club Championship	2
6	Aggregate	3
70	Total aggregate	28
