= 2022 FIFA World Cup Group C =

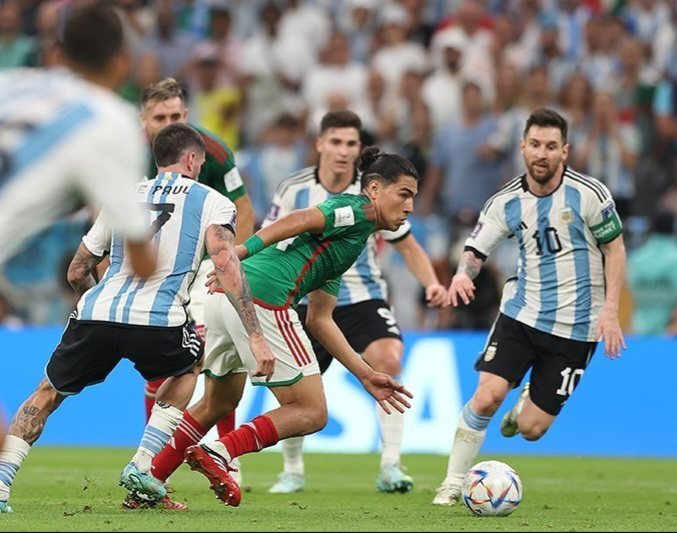
Argentina playing against Mexico

Group C of the 2022 FIFA World Cup took place from 22 to 30 November 2022. The group consisted of national association football teams representing Argentina, Saudi Arabia, Mexico and Poland. The top two teams, Argentina and Poland, advanced to the round of 16. Argentina won the group, defeating Poland and Mexico having lost their first match against Saudi Arabia. Poland and Mexico both finished on four points, winning matches over Saudi Arabia and losing to Argentina. Poland finished second on goal difference, defeating Saudi Arabia 2‍–‍0, whilst Mexico only won 2‍–‍1. This marked the first time that Mexico did not advance past the first round since 1978.

== Teams ==
The teams were decided by the World Cup draw that took place on 1 April 2022. The group was set to receive one team from each pot, which sorted all World Cup teams by position on the FIFA World Rankings. The first team drawn was Argentina, who secured qualification as a pot one team following their second place finish in CONMEBOL qualification. The second pot team, Mexico qualified as runner-up in the third round of CONCACAF qualifying. The third team was Poland, who was the UEfA second round path B winner. Saudi Arabia were the pot four team, having won Group B in the third round of AFC qualifying.

FIFA World Cup Group C draw
Draw position	Team	Pot	Confederation	Method of qualification	Date of qualification	Finals appearance	Last appearance	Previous best performance	FIFA Rankings	
Draw position	Team	Pot	Confederation	Method of qualification	Date of qualification	Finals appearance	Last appearance	Previous best performance	March 2022 (Note: The rankings of March 2022 were used for seeding for the final draw.)	October 2022
C1	Argentina	1	CONMEBOL	CONMEBOL round robin runners-up	16 November 2021	18th	2018	Winners (1978, 1986)	4	3
C2	Saudi Arabia	4	AFC	AFC third round Group B winners	24 March 2022	6th	2018	Round of 16 (1994)	49	51
C3	Mexico	2	CONCACAF	CONCACAF third round runners-up	30 March 2022	17th	2018	Quarter-finals (1970, 1986)	9	13
C4	Poland	3	UEFA	UEFA second round Path B winners	29 March 2022	9th	2018	Third place (1974, 1982)	26	26

== Standings ==
Pos	Team	Pld	W	D	L	GF	GA	GD	Pts	Qualification
1	Argentina	3	2	0	1	5	2	+3	6	Advance to knockout stage
2	Poland	3	1	1	1	2	2	0	4	Advance to knockout stage
3	Mexico	3	1	1	1	2	3	−1	4	
4	Saudi Arabia	3	1	0	2	3	5	−2	3	

Source: FIFA
Rules for classification: Group stage tiebreakers

In the round of 16:

- The winners of Group C, Argentina, advanced to play the runners-up of Group D, Australia.
- The runners-up of Group C, Poland, advanced to play the winners of Group D, France.

== Matches ==
Matches took place from 22 to 30 November 2022. All times listed are local, AST (UTC+3).

=== Argentina vs Saudi Arabia ===
Argentina had faced Saudi Arabia four times prior to the tournament, most recently in 2012, a 0–0 friendly. Argentina took the lead in the 10th minute with a penalty from Lionel Messi, awarded for a foul on Leandro Paredes, which he rolled into the left corner. Argentina would have three further first-half goals ruled out for marginal offsides, once from Messi and twice from Lautaro Martínez. In the second half, Saudi Arabia would quickly find an equalizer, with Saleh Al-Shehri converting a low shot into the net's right corner in the 48th minute. Saudi Arabia then took the lead five minutes later when Salem Al-Dawsari curled the ball into the right corner of the net from just inside the penalty area. Following nearly fourteen minutes of stoppage time caused by a delay in the match due to Saudi defender Yasser Al-Shahrani colliding with his own goalkeeper Mohammed Al-Owais, Saudi Arabia managed to see out the victory.

Saudi Arabia's victory ended Argentina's 36-match unbeaten streak, dating back to 2019. According to Gracenote, the win was the "most surprising" in World Cup history, with many calling it one of the biggest World Cup upsets of all time. This was also the first World Cup since 1990 in which Argentina lost their opening match. Following their eventual victory in the final, Argentina became just the second side to win the tournament despite losing their first game; Spain did the same in 2010 after losing their opener against Switzerland.

22 November 2022
13:00

Argentina	1–2	Saudi Arabia
Messi 10' (pen.)		Al-Shehri 48'; S. Al-Dawsari 53'

Lusail Stadium, Lusail
Attendance: 88,012
Referee: Slavko Vinčić (Slovenia)

Argentina	Saudi Arabia

GK	23	Emiliano Martínez
RB	26	Nahuel Molina
CB	13	Cristian Romero	(substituted off) 59'
CB	19	Nicolás Otamendi
LB	3	Nicolás Tagliafico	(substituted off) 71'
CM	7	Rodrigo De Paul
CM	5	Leandro Paredes	(substituted off) 59'
RW	11	Ángel Di María
LW	17	Papu Gómez	(substituted off) 59'
CF	10	Lionel Messi (c)
CF	22	Lautaro Martínez
Substitutions:
DF	25	Lisandro Martínez	(substituted on) 59'
FW	9	Julián Alvarez	(substituted on) 59'
MF	24	Enzo Fernández	(substituted on) 59'
MF	8	Marcos Acuña	(substituted on) 71'
Manager:
Lionel Scaloni

GK	21	Mohammed Al-Owais	(yellow card) 90+2'
RB	12	Saud Abdulhamid	(yellow card) 82'
CB	17	Hassan Al-Tombakti
CB	5	Ali Al-Bulaihi	(yellow card) 75'
LB	13	Yasser Al-Shahrani		(substituted off) 90+9'
DM	8	Abdulellah Al-Malki	(yellow card) 67'
RM	9	Firas Al-Buraikan		(substituted off) 89'
CM	7	Salman Al-Faraj (c)		(substituted off) 45+4'
CM	23	Mohamed Kanno
LM	10	Salem Al-Dawsari	(yellow card) 79'
CF	11	Saleh Al-Shehri		(substituted off) 78'
Substitutions:
MF	18	Nawaf Al-Abed	(yellow card) 88'	(substituted on) 45+4'	(substituted off) 89'
DF	2	Sultan Al-Ghannam		(substituted on) 78'
DF	4	Abdulelah Al-Amri			(substituted on) 89'
FW	25	Haitham Asiri		(substituted on) 89'
DF	6	Mohammed Al-Breik		(substituted on) 90+9'
Manager:
(France) Hervé Renard

Man of the Match:
Mohammed Al-Owais (Saudi Arabia)

Assistant referees:
Tomaž Klančnik (Slovenia)
Andraž Kovačič (Slovenia)
Fourth official:
Maguette Ndiaye (Senegal)
Reserve assistant referee:
El Hadj Malick Samba (Senegal)
Video assistant referee:
Pol van Boekel (Netherlands)
Assistant video assistant referees:
Bastian Dankert (Germany)
Abdelhak Etchiali (Algeria)
Ricardo de Burgos Bengoetxea (Spain)
Stand-by assistant video assistant referee:
Nicolas Danos (France)

=== Mexico vs Poland ===
Mexico and Poland had played eight times previously, including once in a World Cup, the 3–1 first group stage victory for Poland in 1978, and most recently in 2017, a 1–0 win for Mexico in a friendly. The only shot on target of the first half was from Mexico's Jorge Sánchez, which was punched away by goalkeeper Wojciech Szczęsny. In the 54th minute, Poland captain Robert Lewandowski was awarded a penalty after the video assistant referee judged that Héctor Moreno had fouled him inside the penalty area. Guillermo Ochoa saved the penalty taken by Lewandowski, diving to his left, and the game stayed goalless. At the other end of the field, Mexico had a chance to win the game as a ball into the penalty area from Edson Álvarez went towards Henry Martín who attempted to head the ball beyond Szczęsny; however, the Poland goalkeeper managed to beat the ball away.

Poland failed to win their opening match in a World Cup for the eighth time, having won just one of their nine opening tournament games, though for the first time since 1986, they did not lose the opener.

22 November 2022
19:00

Mexico	0–0	Poland

Stadium 974, Doha
Attendance: 39,369
Referee: Chris Beath (Australia)

Mexico	Poland

GK	13	Guillermo Ochoa (c)
RB	19	Jorge Sánchez	(yellow card) 29'
CB	3	César Montes
CB	15	Héctor Moreno	(yellow card) 56'
LB	23	Jesús Gallardo
DM	4	Edson Álvarez
CM	16	Héctor Herrera		(substituted off) 71'
CM	24	Luis Chávez
RF	22	Hirving Lozano
CF	20	Henry Martín		(substituted off) 71'
LF	10	Alexis Vega		(substituted off) 84'
Substitutions:
MF	8	Carlos Rodríguez		(substituted on) 71'
FW	9	Raúl Jiménez		(substituted on) 71'
FW	21	Uriel Antuna		(substituted on) 84'
Other disciplinary actions:
TS	—	(Argentina) Jorge Theiler	(yellow card) 61'
Manager:
(Argentina) Gerardo Martino

GK	1	Wojciech Szczęsny
CB	18	Bartosz Bereszyński
CB	15	Kamil Glik
CB	14	Jakub Kiwior
DM	10	Grzegorz Krychowiak
CM	13	Jakub Kamiński
CM	19	Sebastian Szymański		(substituted off) 71'
RW	2	Matty Cash
LW	21	Nicola Zalewski		(substituted off) 46'
CF	20	Piotr Zieliński		(substituted off) 87'
CF	9	Robert Lewandowski (c)
Substitutions:
MF	6	Krystian Bielik		(substituted on) 46'
MF	24	Przemysław Frankowski	(yellow card) 76'	(substituted on) 71'
FW	7	Arkadiusz Milik		(substituted on) 87'
Manager:
Czesław Michniewicz

Man of the Match:
Guillermo Ochoa (Mexico)

Assistant referees:
Anton Shchetinin (Australia)
Ashley Beecham (Australia)
Fourth official:
Stéphanie Frappart (France)
Reserve assistant referee:
Neuza Back (Brazil)
Video assistant referee:
Shaun Evans (Australia)
Assistant video assistant referees:
Nicolás Gallo (Colombia)
Martín Soppi (Uruguay)
Juan Soto (Venezuela)
Stand-by assistant video assistant referee:
Djibril Camara (Senegal)

=== Poland vs Saudi Arabia ===
Poland and Saudi Arabia were playing for the fifth time, the most recent previous match a 2–1 win for Poland in a friendly match in 2006. Piotr Zieliński scored the opening goal for Poland in the 39th minute when he shot high to the net from six yards out after the ball was passed from the right. At the end of the first half, Saleh Al-Shehri was fouled in the box and awarded a penalty kick. However, Salem Al-Dawsari's attempt was saved by Polish goalkeeper Wojciech Szczęsny diving low to his right. In the second half, an error by Abdulellah Al-Malki led to Robert Lewandowski winning the ball and scoring his first World Cup goal in the 82nd minute shooting low to the net, as Poland would win the match 2–0. This was the first time Poland had gone unbeaten in their opening two World Cup games since 1986.

26 November 2022
16:00

Poland	2–0	Saudi Arabia
Zieliński 39'; Lewandowski 82'

Education City Stadium, Al Rayyan
Attendance: 44,259
Referee: Wilton Sampaio (Brazil)

Poland	Saudi Arabia

GK	1	Wojciech Szczęsny
CB	18	Bartosz Bereszyński
CB	15	Kamil Glik
CB	14	Jakub Kiwior	(yellow card) 15'
RM	2	Matty Cash	(yellow card) 16'
CM	6	Krystian Bielik
CM	10	Grzegorz Krychowiak
LM	24	Przemysław Frankowski
AM	20	Piotr Zieliński		(substituted off) 63'
CF	7	Arkadiusz Milik	(yellow card) 19'	(substituted off) 71'
CF	9	Robert Lewandowski (c)
Substitutions:
MF	13	Jakub Kamiński		(substituted on) 63'
FW	23	Krzysztof Piątek		(substituted on) 71'
Manager:
Czesław Michniewicz

GK	21	Mohammed Al-Owais
RB	12	Saud Abdulhamid
CB	4	Abdulelah Al-Amri	(yellow card) 45+4'
CB	5	Ali Al-Bulaihi
LB	6	Mohammed Al-Breik		(substituted off) 65'
DM	8	Abdulellah Al-Malki	(yellow card) 20'	(substituted off) 85'
CM	16	Sami Al-Najei		(substituted off) 46'
CM	23	Mohamed Kanno
RW	9	Firas Al-Buraikan
LW	10	Salem Al-Dawsari (c)
CF	11	Saleh Al-Shehri		(substituted off) 85'
Substitutions:
MF	18	Nawaf Al-Abed		(substituted on) 46'	(substituted off) 90+5'
DF	2	Sultan Al-Ghannam		(substituted on) 65'
FW	20	Abdulrahman Al-Aboud		(substituted on) 85'
MF	24	Nasser Al-Dawsari		(substituted on) 85'
FW	19	Hattan Bahebri			(substituted on) 90+5'
Other disciplinary actions:
TS	—	(France) Laurent Bonadei	(yellow card) 27'
Manager:
(France) Hervé Renard

Man of the Match:
Robert Lewandowski (Poland)

Assistant referees:
Bruno Boschilia (Brazil)
Bruno Pires (Brazil)
Fourth official:
Kevin Ortega (Peru)
Reserve assistant referee:
Michael Orué (Peru)
Video assistant referee:
Drew Fischer (Canada)
Assistant video assistant referees:
Armando Villarreal (United States)
Nicolás Taran (Uruguay)
Leodán González (Uruguay)
Stand-by assistant video assistant referee:
Martín Soppi (Uruguay)

=== Argentina vs Mexico ===
Argentina and Mexico had faced each other in 35 previous matches including at the FIFA World Cup on three previous occasions, with Argentina winning all three matches: a 6–3 group stage victory in 1930, a 2–1 round of 16 win in 2006, and another round of 16 victory by a 3–1 scoreline in 2010.

After a goalless first half, Lionel Messi put Argentina in the lead in the 64th minute with a shot from outside the penalty area. Enzo Fernández made it 2–0 and secured the win in the 87th minute with a curled finish in the top right corner of the net. Messi's assist for Fernández's goal made him the first player to record assists at five different World Cups. The match's reported attendance of 88,966 was the highest for a World Cup fixture since the 94,194 spectators at the Rose Bowl for the 1994 final.

26 November 2022
22:00

Argentina	2–0	Mexico
Messi 64'; Fernández 87'

Lusail Stadium, Lusail
Attendance: 88,966
Referee: Daniele Orsato (Italy)

Argentina	Mexico

GK	23	Emiliano Martínez
RB	4	Gonzalo Montiel	(yellow card) 43'	(substituted off) 63'
CB	19	Nicolás Otamendi
CB	25	Lisandro Martínez
LB	8	Marcos Acuña
CM	7	Rodrigo De Paul
CM	18	Guido Rodríguez		(substituted off) 57'
RW	11	Ángel Di María		(substituted off) 69'
LW	20	Alexis Mac Allister		(substituted off) 69'
CF	10	Lionel Messi (c)
CF	22	Lautaro Martínez		(substituted off) 63'
Substitutions:
MF	24	Enzo Fernández		(substituted on) 57'
FW	9	Julián Alvarez		(substituted on) 63'
DF	26	Nahuel Molina		(substituted on) 63'
MF	14	Exequiel Palacios		(substituted on) 69'
DF	13	Cristian Romero		(substituted on) 69'
Manager:
Lionel Scaloni

GK	13	Guillermo Ochoa
CB	2	Néstor Araujo	(yellow card) 22'
CB	3	César Montes
CB	15	Héctor Moreno
RWB	26	Kevin Álvarez		(substituted off) 66'
LWB	23	Jesús Gallardo
CM	24	Luis Chávez
CM	16	Héctor Herrera	(yellow card) 66'
CM	18	Andrés Guardado (c)		(substituted off) 42'
CF	22	Hirving Lozano		(substituted off) 73'
CF	10	Alexis Vega		(substituted off) 66'
Substitutions:
MF	14	Érick Gutiérrez	(yellow card) 50'	(substituted on) 42'
FW	9	Raúl Jiménez		(substituted on) 66'
FW	21	Uriel Antuna		(substituted on) 66'
FW	25	Roberto Alvarado	(yellow card) 89'	(substituted on) 73'
Manager:
(Argentina) Gerardo Martino

Man of the Match:
Lionel Messi (Argentina)

Assistant referees:
Ciro Carbone (Italy)
Alessandro Giallatini (Italy)
Fourth official:
István Kovács (Romania)
Reserve assistant referee:
Ovidiu Artene (Romania)
Video assistant referee:
Massimiliano Irrati (Italy)
Assistant video assistant referees:
Paolo Valeri (Italy)
Roberto Díaz Pérez del Palomar (Spain)
Jérôme Brisard (France)
Stand-by assistant video assistant referee:
Jerson dos Santos (Angola)

=== Poland vs Argentina ===
Poland had faced Argentina eleven times before including twice in the World Cup; Poland's 3–2 first group stage victory in 1974 and Argentina's 2–0 second group stage win in 1978. Argentina were awarded a first-half penalty when Polish goalkeeper Wojciech Szczęsny was adjudged to have made illegal contact with Lionel Messi while attempting to punch the ball away. However, Szczęsny would then keep out Messi's subsequent spot kick, saving a penalty for the second match in a row. Szczęsny would nevertheless concede for the first time in the tournament after Argentina scored twice in the second half; the first goal came from Alexis Mac Allister with a low shot to the left corner immediately following the restart, and the second from Julián Alvarez with a shot to the top right of the net, as the Argentines won 2–0 and topped the group with six points, reaching the knockout stage for the thirteenth time in their last fourteen World Cup appearances.

Szczęsny became just the third goalkeeper to save multiple penalties at a single World Cup (excluding shoot-outs), following compatriot Jan Tomaszewski in 1974 and Brad Friedel in 2002. Despite defeat, Poland would still join Argentina in the last 16 thanks to a superior goal difference to Mexico, ending their 36-year knockout stage drought.

30 November 2022
22:00

Poland	0–2	Argentina
		Mac Allister 46'; Alvarez 67'

Stadium 974, Doha
Attendance: 44,089
Referee: Danny Makkelie (Netherlands)

Poland	Argentina

GK	1	Wojciech Szczęsny
RB	2	Matty Cash
CB	15	Kamil Glik
CB	14	Jakub Kiwior
LB	18	Bartosz Bereszyński		(substituted off) 72'
RM	20	Piotr Zieliński
CM	6	Krystian Bielik		(substituted off) 62'
CM	10	Grzegorz Krychowiak	(yellow card) 78'	(substituted off) 83'
LM	24	Przemysław Frankowski		(substituted off) 46'
CF	9	Robert Lewandowski (c)
CF	16	Karol Świderski		(substituted off) 46'
Substitutions:
MF	26	Michał Skóraś		(substituted on) 46'
MF	13	Jakub Kamiński		(substituted on) 46'
MF	8	Damian Szymański		(substituted on) 62'
DF	3	Artur Jędrzejczyk		(substituted on) 72'
FW	23	Krzysztof Piątek		(substituted on) 83'
Manager:
Czesław Michniewicz

GK	23	Emiliano Martínez
RB	26	Nahuel Molina
CB	13	Cristian Romero
CB	19	Nicolás Otamendi
LB	8	Marcos Acuña	(yellow card) 49'	(substituted off) 59'
DM	24	Enzo Fernández		(substituted off) 79'
CM	7	Rodrigo De Paul
CM	20	Alexis Mac Allister		(substituted off) 83'
RF	11	Ángel Di María		(substituted off) 59'
CF	10	Lionel Messi (c)
LF	9	Julián Alvarez		(substituted off) 79'
Substitutions:
MF	5	Leandro Paredes		(substituted on) 59'
DF	3	Nicolás Tagliafico		(substituted on) 59'
DF	6	Germán Pezzella		(substituted on) 79'
FW	22	Lautaro Martínez		(substituted on) 79'
MF	16	Thiago Almada		(substituted on) 83'
Manager:
Lionel Scaloni

Man of the Match:
Alexis Mac Allister (Argentina)

Assistant referees:
Hessel Steegstra (Netherlands)
Jan de Vries (Netherlands)
Fourth official:
Saíd Martínez (Honduras)
Reserve assistant referee:
Helpys Raymundo Feliz (Dominican Republic)
Video assistant referee:
Pol van Boekel (Netherlands)
Assistant video assistant referees:
Bastian Dankert (Germany)
Kathryn Nesbitt (United States)
Juan Soto (Venezuela)
Stand-by assistant video assistant referee:
Anton Shchetinin (Australia)

=== Saudi Arabia vs Mexico ===
Mexico and Saudi Arabia had met five previous times, most recently in 1999, a 5–1 win for Mexico at the FIFA Confederations Cup. After a goalless first half, Mexico struck twice in the second half, first with a volley from a corner by Henry Martín in the 47th minute, and then with a thunderous free kick by Luis Chávez in the 52nd minute. However, Mexico failed to find a third goal, which they needed to overtake Poland on goal difference; Mexico had received more yellow cards than Poland and would have been eliminated on this basis if the teams finished level on points, goal difference, and goals scored. Salem Al-Dawsari, however, would score for Saudi Arabia in the fifth minute of added time with a goal after a one-two, confirming both teams' elimination as Mexico claimed the 2–1 win.

This was the first time Mexico failed to advance to the knockout stage at a FIFA World Cup since 1978; meanwhile, Saudi Arabia's knockout stage drought extended to 32 years, having failed to progress past the group stage since the country's tournament debut in 1994, standing as the second longest knockout stage drought after that of North Korea.

30 November 2022
22:00

Saudi Arabia	1–2	Mexico
S. Al-Dawsari 90+5'		Martín 47'; Chávez 52'

Lusail Stadium, Lusail
Attendance: 84,985
Referee: Michael Oliver (England)

Saudi Arabia	Mexico

GK	21	Mohammed Al-Owais
CB	17	Hassan Al-Tombakti	(yellow card) 52'
CB	4	Abdulelah Al-Amri	(yellow card) 90+1'
CB	5	Ali Al-Bulaihi		(substituted off) 37'
RM	2	Sultan Al-Ghannam		(substituted off) 88'
CM	15	Ali Al-Hassan	(yellow card) 34'	(substituted off) 46'
CM	23	Mohamed Kanno
LM	12	Saud Abdulhamid
RF	9	Firas Al-Buraikan
CF	11	Saleh Al-Shehri	(yellow card) 28'	(substituted off) 62'
LF	10	Salem Al-Dawsari (c)
Substitutions:
MF	26	Riyadh Sharahili		(substituted on) 37'
DF	3	Abdullah Madu	(yellow card) 81'	(substituted on) 46'
FW	20	Abdulrahman Al-Aboud		(substituted on) 62'
FW	19	Hattan Bahebri	(yellow card) 90+7'	(substituted on) 88'
Manager:
(France) Hervé Renard

GK	13	Guillermo Ochoa (c)
RB	19	Jorge Sánchez		(substituted off) 86'
CB	3	César Montes
CB	15	Héctor Moreno
LB	23	Jesús Gallardo
CM	4	Edson Álvarez	(yellow card) 16'	(substituted off) 86'
CM	24	Luis Chávez
RW	22	Hirving Lozano
AM	17	Orbelín Pineda		(substituted off) 77'
LW	10	Alexis Vega		(substituted off) 46'
CF	20	Henry Martín		(substituted off) 77'
Substitutions:
FW	21	Uriel Antuna		(substituted on) 46'
FW	9	Raúl Jiménez		(substituted on) 77'
MF	8	Carlos Rodríguez		(substituted on) 77'
DF	26	Kevin Álvarez		(substituted on) 86'
FW	11	Rogelio Funes Mori		(substituted on) 86'
Manager:
(Argentina) Gerardo Martino

Man of the Match:
Luis Chávez (Mexico)

Assistant referees:
Stuart Burt (England)
Simon Bennett (England)
Fourth official:
István Kovács (Romania)
Reserve assistant referee:
Vasile Marinescu (Romania)
Video assistant referee:
Massimiliano Irrati (Italy)
Assistant video assistant referees:
Paolo Valeri (Italy)
Alessandro Giallatini (Italy)
Alejandro Hernández Hernández (Spain)
Stand-by assistant video assistant referee:
Ciro Carbone (Italy)

== Discipline ==
Fair play points would have been used as tiebreakers if the overall and head-to-head records of teams were tied. These were calculated based on yellow and red cards received in all group matches as follows:

- first yellow card: −1 point;
- indirect red card (second yellow card): −3 points;
- direct red card: −4 points;
- yellow card and direct red card: −5 points;

Only one of the above deductions was applied to a player in a single match.

Team	Match 1				Match 2				Match 3				Points
Team	Booked	(yellow card) (yellow-red card)	Sent off (straight red)	(yellow card) (red card)	Booked	(yellow card) (yellow-red card)	Sent off (straight red)	(yellow card) (red card)	Booked	(yellow card) (yellow-red card)	Sent off (straight red)	(yellow card) (red card)	Points
Argentina					1				1				−2
Poland	1				3				1				−5
Mexico	2				4				1				−7
Saudi Arabia	6				2				6				−14

== See also ==
- Argentina at the FIFA World Cup
- Mexico at the FIFA World Cup
- Poland at the FIFA World Cup
- Saudi Arabia at the FIFA World Cup
