= Saudi Arabia at the AFC Asian Cup =

National football delegation

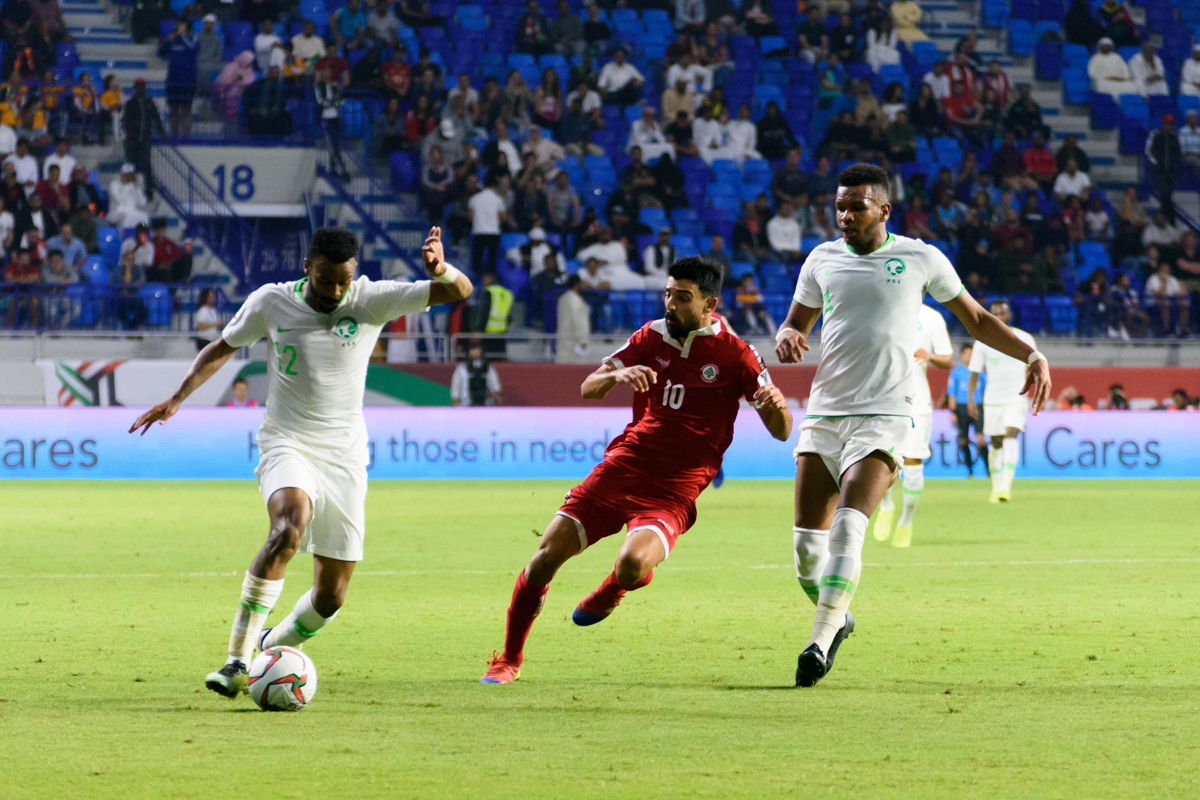
Saudi Arabia against Lebanon during the 2019 AFC Asian Cup.

Saudi Arabia is one of the most successful teams in Asia, having won three AFC Asian Cup titles and is one of the stronger teams in the continent. With influential experiences, the Saudi team has been a major force in the Asian Cup.

The Saudis first qualified to the Asian Cup was in 1984, and it was also the first time Saudi Arabia claimed the title. They repeated the feat in 1988 and 1996, before reaching two other finals, both ended in defeats. Having said, Saudi Arabia also has disappointing performances, notably 2004, 2011 and 2015, when Saudi Arabia crashed out from the group stage. Saudi Arabia will play in 2023 edition, looking on their quest to win the Asian Cup in the new millennia. Saudi Arabia will host the 2027 edition which will mark the first time that the country has ever hosted the Asian Cup.

== 1984 AFC Asian Cup ==
=== Group A ===
Pos	Team	Pld	W	D	L	GF	GA	GD	Pts	Qualification
1	Saudi Arabia	4	2	2	0	4	2	+2	6	Advance to knockout stage
2	Kuwait	4	2	1	1	4	2	+2	5	Advance to knockout stage
3	Qatar	4	1	2	1	3	3	0	4	
4	Syria	4	1	1	2	3	5	−2	3	
5	South Korea	4	0	2	2	1	3	−2	2	

Source: RSSSF
2 December 1984
19:00

Saudi Arabia	1–1	South Korea
Abdullah 90'		Lee Tae-Ho 51'

National Stadium, Singapore
Attendance: 20,000
Referee: George Joseph (Malaysia)

4 December 1984
21:00

Syria	0–1	Saudi Arabia
		Khalifa 66'

National Stadium, Singapore
Attendance: 2,000
Referee: Shizuo Takada (Japan)

8 December 1984
19:00

Qatar	1–1	Saudi Arabia
Zaid 47'		Abduljawad 65'

National Stadium, Singapore
Attendance: 15,000
Referee: Antonio Márquez (Mexico)

11 December 1984
21:00

Kuwait	0–1	Saudi Arabia
		Al-Jam'an 88'

National Stadium, Singapore
Attendance: 5,000
Referee: Toshikazu Sano (Japan)

=== Knockout stage ===
Semi-finals

13 December 1984
20:00

Saudi Arabia	1–1 (a.e.t.)	Iran
Shahin Bayani 88' (o.g.)		Shahrokh Bayani 43'
Penalties
Abdullah (penalty scored); Abduljawad (penalty scored); Nu'eimeh (penalty scored); Al-Jam'an (penalty scored); Al-Musaibeah (penalty scored)	5–4	(penalty scored) Hajiloo; (penalty scored) Mokhtarifar; (penalty scored) Derakhshan; (penalty missed) Panjali; (penalty scored) Shahrokh Bayani

National Stadium, Singapore
Attendance: 20,000
Referee: George Courtney (England)

Final

16 December 1984
20:00

Saudi Arabia	2–0	China
Al-Nafisah 10'; Abdullah 46'

National Stadium, Singapore
Attendance: 26,000
Referee: Shizuo Takada (Japan)

== 1988 AFC Asian Cup ==
=== Group B ===
Pos	Team	Pld	W	D	L	GF	GA	GD	Pts	Qualification
1	Saudi Arabia	4	2	2	0	4	1	+3	6	Advance to knockout stage
2	China	4	2	1	1	6	3	+3	5	Advance to knockout stage
3	Syria	4	2	0	2	2	5	−3	4	
4	Kuwait	4	0	3	1	2	3	−1	3	
5	Bahrain	4	0	2	2	1	3	−2	2	

Source: RSSSF
2 December 1988
18:00

Syria	0–2	Saudi Arabia
	Report	Al-Mutlaq 20'; Al-Suwaiyed 82'

Qatar SC Stadium, Doha
Referee: Erik Fredriksson (Sweden)

5 December 1988
15:00

Saudi Arabia	0–0	Kuwait
	Report

Al-Ahly Stadium, Doha
Referee: Michel Vautrot (France)

9 December 1988
15:00

Saudi Arabia	1–1	Bahrain
Jazea'a 78'	Report	F. Mohamed 44' (pen.)

Qatar SC Stadium, Doha
Referee: Vincent Mauro (United States)

12 December 1988
15:00

China	0–1	Saudi Arabia
	Report	Al-Bishi 56'

Al-Ahly Stadium, Doha
Referee: Mohamed Hansal (Algeria)

=== Knockout stage ===
Semi-finals

15 December 1988
16:00

Saudi Arabia	1–0	Iran
Abdullah 16'	Report

Qatar SC Stadium, Doha
Attendance: 17,000
Referee: George Courtney (England)

Final

18 December 1988
16:00

South Korea	0–0 (a.e.t.)	Saudi Arabia
	Report
Penalties
Cho Min-Kook (penalty missed); Lee Tae-Ho (penalty scored); Byun Byung-Joo (penalty scored); Kim Joo-Sung (penalty scored); Cho Yoon-Hwan (penalty missed)	3–4	(penalty scored) Nu'eimeh; (penalty missed) Abd Al-Jawad; (penalty scored) Abdullah; (penalty scored) Al-Mutlaq; (penalty scored) Al-Bishi

Al-Ahly Stadium, Doha
Attendance: 20,000
Referee: Michel Vautrot (France)

== 1992 AFC Asian Cup ==
=== Group B ===
Pos	Team	Pld	W	D	L	GF	GA	GD	Pts	Qualification
1	Saudi Arabia	3	1	2	0	6	2	+4	4	Advance to knockout stage
2	China	3	1	2	0	3	2	+1	4	Advance to knockout stage
3	Qatar	3	0	2	1	3	4	−1	2	
4	Thailand	3	0	2	1	1	5	−4	2	

Source: WorldFootball.net
29 October 1992
17:00

Saudi Arabia	1–1	China
Al-Thunayan 17'	Report	Li Bing 41'

Hiroshima Big Arch, Hiroshima
Attendance: 15,000
Referee: Shinichiro Obata (Japan)

31 October 1992
13:00

Saudi Arabia	1–1	Qatar
Al-Muwallid 86'	Report	Mustafa 74'

Hiroshima Stadium, Hiroshima
Attendance: 4,000
Referee: Neji Jouini (Tunisia)

2 November 1992
17:00

Saudi Arabia	4–0	Thailand
Al-Owairan 4'; Al-Bishi 19', 72'; Al-Thunayan 64'	Report

Bingo Sports Park, Onomichi
Attendance: 4,000
Referee: Ali Bujsaim (United Arab Emirates)

=== Knockout stage ===
Semi-finals

6 November 1992
19:00

Saudi Arabia	2–0	United Arab Emirates
Al-Owairan 77'; Al-Bishi 80'	Report

Hiroshima Stadium, Hiroshima
Attendance: 12,000
Referee: Rasheed Al-Jassas (Kuwait)

Final

8 November 1992
14:30

Japan	1–0	Saudi Arabia
Takagi 36'	Report

Hiroshima Big Arch, Hiroshima
Attendance: 60,000
Referee: Jamal Al Sharif (Syria)

== 1996 AFC Asian Cup ==
=== Group B ===
Pos	Team	Pld	W	D	L	GF	GA	GD	Pts	Qualification
1	Iran	3	2	0	1	7	3	+4	6	Advance to knockout stage
2	Saudi Arabia	3	2	0	1	7	3	+4	6	Advance to knockout stage
3	Iraq	3	2	0	1	6	3	+3	6	Advance to knockout stage
4	Thailand	3	0	0	3	2	13	−11	0	

Source: RSSSF

5 December 1996
16:45

Saudi Arabia	6–0	Thailand
Al-Temawi 10' (pen.), 29' (pen.); Al-Mehallel 15', 54'; Al-Muwallid 18'; Al-Jaber 52'	Report

Al-Maktoum Stadium, Dubai
Attendance: 5,000
Referee: Gamal Al-Ghandour (Egypt)

8 December 1996
16:45

Saudi Arabia	1–0	Iraq
Al-Mehallel 26'	Report

Al-Maktoum Stadium, Dubai
Attendance: 12,000
Referee: Ali Bujsaim (United Arab Emirates)

11 December 1996
16:45

Saudi Arabia	0–3	Iran
	Report	Daei 12'; Bagheri 37'; Azizi 47'

Al-Maktoum Stadium, Dubai
Attendance: 12,000
Referee: Masayoshi Okada (Japan)

=== Knockout stage ===
Quarter-finals

16 December 1996
19:30

Saudi Arabia	4–3	China
Al-Thunayan 31', 65'; Al-Jaber 34'; Al-Mehallel 43'	Report	Zhang Enhua 6', 89'; Peng Weiguo 16'

Sheikh Zayed Stadium, Abu Dhabi
Attendance: 5,000
Referee: Mohd Nazri Abdullah (Malaysia)

Semi-finals

19 December 1996
19:30

Iran	0–0 (a.e.t.)	Saudi Arabia
	Report
Penalties
Daei (penalty missed); Peyrovani (penalty scored); Yazdani (penalty missed); Estili (penalty scored); Bagheri (penalty scored); Khakpour (penalty missed)	3–4	(penalty missed) Al-Temawi; (penalty scored) Sulaimani; (penalty scored) Zubromawi; (penalty missed) Al-Muwallid; (penalty scored) Al-Harbi; (penalty scored) Madani

Sheikh Zayed Stadium, Abu Dhabi
Attendance: 35,000
Referee: Gamal Al-Ghandour (Egypt)

Final

21 December 1996
19:30

United Arab Emirates	0–0 (a.e.t.)	Saudi Arabia
	Report
Penalties
M. Ali (penalty scored); Saleh (penalty missed); K. Saad (penalty scored); Saeed (penalty missed)	2–4	(penalty scored) Al-Thunayan; (penalty scored) Zubromawi; (penalty missed) Al-Harbi; (penalty scored) Al-Temawi; (penalty scored) Al-Muwallid

Sheikh Zayed Stadium, Abu Dhabi
Attendance: 60,000
Referee: Mohd Nazri Abdullah (Malaysia)

== 2000 AFC Asian Cup ==
=== Group C ===
Pos	Team	Pld	W	D	L	GF	GA	GD	Pts	Qualification
1	Japan	3	2	1	0	13	3	+10	7	Advance to knockout stage
2	Saudi Arabia	3	1	1	1	6	4	+2	4	Advance to knockout stage
3	Qatar	3	0	3	0	2	2	0	3	Advance to knockout stage
4	Uzbekistan	3	0	1	2	2	14	−12	1	

Source: RSSSF
14 October 2000
17:00

Saudi Arabia	1–4	Japan
Morioka 90' (o.g.)	Report	Yanagisawa 22'; Takahara 37'; Nanami 53'; Ono 88'

Saida Municipal Stadium, Sidon
Attendance: 5,000
Referee: Ali Bujsaim (United Arab Emirates)

17 October 2000
19:45

Saudi Arabia	0–0	Qatar
	Report

Saida Municipal Stadium, Sidon
Attendance: 5,000
Referee: Tajaddin Fares (Syria)

20 October 2000
19:30

Saudi Arabia	5–0	Uzbekistan
Al-Otaibi 18'; Al-Shalhoub 35', 78', 86'; Al-Temyat 88'	Report

Saida Municipal Stadium, Sidon
Attendance: 2,000
Referee: Kim Young-Joo (South Korea)

=== Knockout stage ===
Quarter-finals

24 October 2000
19:45

Kuwait	2–3 (a.e.t.)	Saudi Arabia
Bashar Abdullah 62'; Al-Huwaidi 68'	Report	Al-Temyat 45+1' 109'; Al-Meshal 72'

Sports City Stadium, Beirut
Attendance: 5,000
Referee: Brian Hall (United States)

Semi-finals

26 October 2000
16:45

South Korea	1–2	Saudi Arabia
Lee Dong-Gook 90+1'	Report	Al-Meshal 76', 80'

Sports City Stadium, Beirut
Attendance: 7,000
Referee: Saad Kamil Al-Fadhli (Kuwait)

Final

29 October 2000
19:45

Japan	1–0	Saudi Arabia
Mochizuki 30'	Report

Sports City Stadium, Beirut
Attendance: 47,400
Referee: Ali Bujsaim (United Arab Emirates)

== 2004 AFC Asian Cup ==
=== Group C ===
Pos	Team	Pld	W	D	L	GF	GA	GD	Pts	Qualification
1	Uzbekistan	3	3	0	0	3	0	+3	9	Advance to knockout stage
2	Iraq	3	2	0	1	5	4	+1	6	Advance to knockout stage
3	Turkmenistan	3	0	1	2	4	6	−2	1	
4	Saudi Arabia	3	0	1	2	3	5	−2	1	

Source: RSSSF
18 July 2004
18:45

Saudi Arabia	2–2	Turkmenistan
Al-Qahtani 9' (pen.), 59'	Report	N. Bayramov 6'; Kuliyev 90+3'

Sichuan Longquanyi Stadium, Chengdu
Attendance: 12,400
Referee: Chaiwat Kunsata (Thailand)

22 July 2004
21:00

Uzbekistan	1–0	Saudi Arabia
Geynrikh 13'	Report

Sichuan Longquanyi Stadium, Chengdu
Attendance: 22,000
Referee: Coffi Codjia (Benin)

26 July 2004
19:00

Saudi Arabia	1–2	Iraq
Al-Montashari 57'	Report	Akram 51'; Mahmoud 86'

Sichuan Longquanyi Stadium, Chengdu
Attendance: 15,000
Referee: Kwon Jong-Chul (South Korea)

== 2007 AFC Asian Cup ==
=== Group D ===
Pos	Team	Pld	W	D	L	GF	GA	GD	Pts	Qualification
1	Saudi Arabia	3	2	1	0	7	2	+5	7	Advance to knockout stage
2	South Korea	3	1	1	1	3	3	0	4	Advance to knockout stage
3	Indonesia (H)	3	1	0	2	3	4	−1	3	
4	Bahrain	3	1	0	2	3	7	−4	3	

Source: Asian Cup 2007
Rules for classification: Tiebreakers
(H) Hosts
11 July 2007
19:30 UTC+7

South Korea	1–1	Saudi Arabia
Choi Sung-Kuk 66'	Report	Y. Al-Qahtani 77' (pen.)

Gelora Bung Karno Stadium, Jakarta
Attendance: 15,000
Referee: Mark Shield (Australia)

14 July 2007
19:30 UTC+7

Saudi Arabia	2–1	Indonesia
Y. Al-Qahtani 12'; Al-Harthi 90'	Report	Aiboy 17'

Gelora Bung Karno Stadium, Jakarta
Attendance: 88,000
Referee: Ali Al-Badwawi (United Arab Emirates)

18 July 2007
17:15 UTC+7

Saudi Arabia	4–0	Bahrain
Al-Mousa 18'; A. Al-Qahtani 45'; Al-Jassim 68', 79'	Report

Gelora Sriwijaya Stadium, Palembang
Attendance: 500
Referee: Yuichi Nishimura (Japan)

=== Knockout stage ===
Quarter-finals

22 July 2007
20:15 UTC+7

Saudi Arabia	2–1	Uzbekistan
Y. Al-Qahtani 3'; Al-Mousa 75'	Report	Solomin 82'

Gelora Bung Karno Stadium, Jakarta
Attendance: 12,000
Referee: Kwon Jong-Chul (South Korea)

Semi-finals

25 July 2007
20:15 UTC+7

Japan	2–3	Saudi Arabia
Nakazawa 37'; Abe 53'	Report	Y. Al-Qahtani 35'; Mouath 47', 57'

Mỹ Đình Stadium, Hanoi
Attendance: 10,000
Referee: Matthew Breeze (Australia)

Final

29 July 2007
19:30 UTC+7

Iraq	1–0	Saudi Arabia
Mahmoud 72'	Report

Gelora Bung Karno Stadium, Jakarta
Attendance: 60,000
Referee: Mark Shield (Australia)

== 2011 AFC Asian Cup ==
=== Group B ===
Pos	Team	Pld	W	D	L	GF	GA	GD	Pts	Qualification
1	Japan	3	2	1	0	8	2	+6	7	Advance to knockout stage
2	Jordan	3	2	1	0	4	2	+2	7	Advance to knockout stage
3	Syria	3	1	0	2	4	5	−1	3	
4	Saudi Arabia	3	0	0	3	1	8	−7	0	

Source: AFC
Rules for classification: Tiebreakers

9 January 2011
Saudi Arabia	1–2	Syria
13 January 2011
Jordan	1–0	Saudi Arabia
17 January 2011
Saudi Arabia	0–5	Japan

== 2015 AFC Asian Cup ==
=== Group B ===
Pos	Team	Pld	W	D	L	GF	GA	GD	Pts	Qualification
1	China	3	3	0	0	5	2	+3	9	Advance to knockout stage
2	Uzbekistan	3	2	0	1	5	3	+2	6	Advance to knockout stage
3	Saudi Arabia	3	1	0	2	5	5	0	3	
4	North Korea	3	0	0	3	2	7	−5	0	

Source: Asian Cup Australia 2015
Rules for classification: Tiebreakers

10 January 2015
Saudi Arabia	0–1	China	Brisbane Stadium, Brisbane
14 January 2015
North Korea	1–4	Saudi Arabia	AAMI Park, Melbourne
18 January 2015
Uzbekistan	3–1	Saudi Arabia	AAMI Park, Melbourne

== 2019 AFC Asian Cup ==
=== Group E ===
Pos	Team	Pld	W	D	L	GF	GA	GD	Pts	Qualification
1	Qatar	3	3	0	0	10	0	+10	9	Advance to knockout stage
2	Saudi Arabia	3	2	0	1	6	2	+4	6	Advance to knockout stage
3	Lebanon	3	1	0	2	4	5	−1	3	
4	North Korea	3	0	0	3	1	14	−13	0	

Source: AFC
8 January 2019
20:00

Saudi Arabia	4–0	North Korea
Bahebri 28'; Al-Fatil 37'; Al-Dawsari 70'; Al-Muwallad 87'	Report

Rashid Stadium, Dubai
Attendance: 5,075
Referee: Peter Green (Australia)

12 January 2019
20:00

Lebanon	0–2	Saudi Arabia
	Report	Al-Muwallad 12'; Al-Mogahwi 67'

Al Maktoum Stadium, Dubai
Attendance: 13,792
Referee: Ali Sabah (Iraq)

17 January 2019
20:00

Saudi Arabia	0–2	Qatar
	Report	Ali 45+1', 80'

Zayed Sports City Stadium, Abu Dhabi
Attendance: 16,067
Referee: Kim Dong-jin (South Korea)

=== Knockout stage ===
Round of 16

21 January 2019
15:00

Japan	1–0	Saudi Arabia
Tomiyasu 20'	Report

Sharjah Stadium, Sharjah
Attendance: 6,832
Referee: Ravshan Irmatov (Uzbekistan)

== 2023 AFC Asian Cup ==
=== Group F ===
Pos	Team	Pld	W	D	L	GF	GA	GD	Pts	Qualification
1	Saudi Arabia	3	2	1	0	4	1	+3	7	Advance to knockout stage
2	Thailand	3	1	2	0	2	0	+2	5	Advance to knockout stage
3	Oman	3	0	2	1	2	3	−1	2	
4	Kyrgyzstan	3	0	1	2	1	5	−4	1	

Source: AFC
16 January 2024
20:30

Saudi Arabia	2–1	Oman
Ghareeb 78'; Al-Bulaihi 90+6'	Report	Al-Yahyaei 14' (pen.)

Khalifa International Stadium, Al Rayyan
Attendance: 41,987
Referee: Shaun Evans (Australia)

21 January 2024
20:30

Kyrgyzstan	0–2	Saudi Arabia
	Report	Kanno 35'; Al-Ghamdi 84'

Ahmad bin Ali Stadium, Al Rayyan
Attendance: 39,557
Referee: Jumpei Iida (Japan)

25 January 2024
18:00

Saudi Arabia	0–0	Thailand
	Report

Education City Stadium, Al Rayyan
Attendance: 38,773
Referee: Kim Hee-gon (South Korea)

=== Knockout stage ===
==== Round of 16 ====
30 January 2024
19:00

Saudi Arabia	1–1 (a.e.t.)	South Korea
Radif 46'	Report	Cho Gue-sung 90+9'
Penalties
Kanno (penalty scored); Abdulhamid (penalty scored); Al-Najei (penalty missed); Ghareeb (penalty missed)	2–4	(penalty scored) Son Heung-min; (penalty scored) Kim Young-gwon; (penalty scored) Cho Gue-sung; (penalty scored) Hwang Hee-chan

Education City Stadium, Al Rayyan
Attendance: 42,389
Referee: Ilgiz Tantashev (Uzbekistan)

== Overall record ==
AFC Asian Cup record									Qualification record					
Year	Result	Position	Pld	W	D	L	GF	GA	Pld	W	D	L	GF	GA
(Hong Kong) 1956	Not an AFC member								Not an AFC member					
(South Korea) 1960	Not an AFC member								Not an AFC member					
(Israel) 1964	Not an AFC member								Not an AFC member					
(Iran) 1968	Not an AFC member								Not an AFC member					
(Thailand) 1972	Not an AFC member								Not an AFC member					
(Iran) 1976	Withdrew								6	3	1	2	12	5
(Kuwait) 1980	Withdrew								Withdrew					
(Singapore) 1984	Champions	1st	6	3	3	0	7	3	4	4	0	0	19	0
(Qatar) 1988	Champions	1st	6	3	3	0	5	1	Automatic qualification as champions					
(Japan) 1992	Runners-up	2nd	5	2	2	1	8	3	Automatic qualification as champions					
(United Arab Emirates) 1996	Champions	1st	6	3	2	1	11	6	4	4	0	0	10	0
(Lebanon) 2000	Runners-up	2nd	6	3	1	2	11	8	Automatic qualification as champions					
(China) 2004	Group stage	13th	3	0	1	2	3	5	6	6	0	0	31	1
(Indonesia) (Malaysia) (Thailand) (Vietnam) 2007	Runners-up	2nd	6	4	1	1	12	6	6	5	0	1	21	4
(Qatar) 2011	Group stage	15th	3	0	0	3	1	8	Automatic qualification as runners-up					
(Australia) 2015	Group stage	10th	3	1	0	2	5	5	6	5	1	0	9	3
(United Arab Emirates) 2019	Round of 16	12th	4	2	0	2	6	3	8	6	2	0	28	4
(Qatar) 2023	Round of 16	10th	4	2	2	0	5	2	8	6	2	0	22	4
(Saudi Arabia) 2027	Qualified as hosts								6	4	1	1	12	3
Total	3 Titles	12/19	52	23	15	14	74	50	54	43	7	4	164	24

== Head-to-head record ==
AFC Asian Cup matches (by team)
Opponent	Pld	W	D	L	GF	GA	GD
Bahrain	2	1	1	0	5	1	+4
China	5	3	1	1	8	5	+3
Indonesia	1	1	0	0	2	1	+1
Iran	4	1	2	1	2	4	-2
Iraq	3	1	0	2	2	3	-1
Japan	6	1	0	5	4	14	-10
Jordan	1	0	0	1	0	1	-1
Kuwait	3	2	1	0	4	2	+2
Kyrgyzstan	1	1	0	0	2	0	+2
Lebanon	1	1	0	0	2	0	+2
North Korea	2	2	0	0	8	1	+7
Oman	1	1	0	0	2	1	+1
Qatar	4	0	3	1	2	4	-2
South Korea	5	1	4	0	5	4	+1
Syria	3	2	0	1	4	2	+2
Thailand	3	2	1	0	10	0	+10
Turkmenistan	1	0	1	0	2	2	0
United Arab Emirates	2	1	1	0	2	0	+2
Uzbekistan	4	2	0	2	8	5	+3

== See also ==
- Saudi Arabia at the FIFA World Cup
- Saudi Arabia at the CONCACAF Gold Cup
