= Soulaiman Matar =

Saudi Arabian footballer

Personal information
- Full name: Soulaiman Ali Matar Al Kabsh
- Date of birth: 1 July 1946
- Place of birth: Saudi Arabia
- Date of death: 26 February 2021 (aged 74)
- Place of death: Riyadh, Saudi Arabia
- Position: Striker

Senior career*
| Years | Team | Apps | (Gls) |
| 1960–1962 | Al Wehda | | |
| 1962–1968 | Al Hilal | | (60) |
| 1968–1975 | Al Ahli | | (58) |

International career
| 1970–1972 | Saudi Arabia | 3 | (0) |
- West Team
- * Club domestic league appearances and goals

Soulaiman Ali Matar Al Kabsh (Arabic: سليمان مطر الكبش; 1 July 1946 – February 2021) was a Saudi Arabian professional footballer who played as a striker for Al Hilal and the Saudi Arabia national team.

== Club career ==
Matar began playing football with Al Watan and Al Shabab of Mecca before securing a professional contract with Al Wehda FC. He played for Wehda in the 1962 King Cup final against Al Hilal SFC, and he joined Al Hilal the following season. Matar finished his career playing for Al Ahli Saudi FC. In a 17-year club football career, Matar played in a record eight King Cup finals and six Saudi Crown Prince Cup finals.

== International career ==
In March 1967, Matar played with the Saudi Arabia national football team in a four match friendly series against Pakistan. He also played at the 1972 Gulf Cup.

== Club Career Stats ==
| Club | Season | SPL | | King Cup | | Crown Prince Cup | | Total | |
| Club | Season | Apps | Goals | Apps | Goals | Apps | Goals | Apps | Goals |
|---|---|---|---|---|---|---|---|---|---|
| Al Hilal | 1962-63 | — | | | | | | | |
| Al Hilal | 1963-64 | — | | | | | | | |
| Al Hilal | 1964-65 | — | | | 3 | | 10 | | 13 |
| Al Hilal | 1965-66 | — | | | | | +9 | | |
| Al Hilal | 1966-67 | — | | | | | | | |
| Total | | — | | | | | 20 | | 60 |
| Al Ahli | 1967-68 | — | | | +1 | | | | |
| Al Ahli | 1968-69 | | +3 | | +2 | | | | |
| Al Ahli | 1969-70 | — | | | | | | | |
| Al Ahli | 1970-71 | — | | | +2 | | | | |
| Al Ahli | 1971-72 | — | | | +3 | | | | |
| Al Ahli | 1972-73 | — | | | +1 | | +2 | | |
| Al Ahli | 1973-74 | — | | | | | | | |
| Al Ahli | 1974-75 | — | | | | | | | |
| Total | | | | | | | 8 | | 58 |
| West Team | 1968-69 | — | | | | | 4 | | |
| Career total | | | | | | | 32 | | |

== Records ==
- Most Al Ahli goals in Jeddah Derby: 13 goals.
