= Saleh Al-Shehri =

Saudi Arabian footballer (born 1993)

Personal information
- Full name: Saleh Khalid Mohammed Al-Shehri
- Date of birth: 1 November 1993 (age 33)
- Place of birth: Wadi ad-Dawasir, Saudi Arabia
- Height: 1.84 m (6 ft 0 in)
- Position: Striker

Team information
- Current team: Al-Ittihad
- Number: 11

Youth career
- 2009–2012: Al-Ahli

Senior career*
| Years | Team | Apps | (Gls) |
| 2012–2015 | Al-Ahli | 9 | (0) |
| 2012 | → Mafra (loan) | 2 | (0) |
| 2012–2013 | → Beira-Mar (loan) | 7 | (2) |
| 2015–2020 | Al-Raed | 71 | (22) |
| 2019–2020 | → Al-Hilal (loan) | 20 | (4) |
| 2020–2024 | Al-Hilal | 78 | (15) |
| 2024– | Al-Ittihad | 39 | (7) |

International career^{‡}
| 2011–2013 | Saudi Arabia U20 | 11 | (8) |
| 2012–2016 | Saudi Arabia U23 | 5 | (3) |
| 2020– | Saudi Arabia | 59 | (19) |
- * Club domestic league appearances and goals as of 20 October 2026 ‡ National team caps and goals as of 5 June 2026

Saleh Khalid Mohammed Al-Shehri (Arabic: صالح خالد محمد الشهري; born 1 November 1993) is a Saudi Arabian professional football player who plays as a striker for Al-Ittihad and the Saudi Arabia national team.

== Club career ==
=== Early career ===
Saleh is a graduate of the Academy of Al-Ahli and played as a striker in the ranks of Al-Ahli junior and youth.

=== Beira-Mar ===
Saleh made his debut on 2 September 2012 at Beira-Mar against Moreirense and scored the first goal in his first match. Saleh is the first Saudi Arabian to score in Europe. At his second match against Vitória, he scored the fastest goal in Primeira Liga 12–13. Saleh played two matches and scored two goals with S.C. Beira-Mar.

=== Return to Al-Ahli ===
On 20 July 2013, Saleh returned to his club. He made his debut friendly match against Najran and losing the match score 1–0.

=== Al-Ittihad ===
On 22 July 2024, Al-Shehri joined Al-Ittihad on a free transfer.

== International career ==
=== Youth ===
Saleh scored a goal against Qatar national under-20 team in the 2012 AFC U-19 Championship, with Saudi Arabia winning 4–2. Saudi Arabia collected four points, but were eliminated after finishing third.

=== Senior ===
On 22 November 2022, Saleh scored the first goal for Saudi Arabia against Argentina at the 2022 FIFA World Cup held in Qatar.

On 31 May 2026, he was named in the 26-man squad for the 2026 FIFA World Cup.

== Career statistics ==
=== Club ===
As of match played 30 December 2024

| Club | Season | League | | | National cup (Note: Includes Taça de Portugal, King's Cup) | | League cup (Note: Includes Taça da Liga, Saudi Crown Prince Cup) | | Continental | | Other | | Total | |
| Club | Season | Division | Apps | Goals | Apps | Goals | Apps | Goals | Apps | Goals | Apps | Goals | Apps | Goals |
|---|---|---|---|---|---|---|---|---|---|---|---|---|---|---|
| Mafra (loan) | 2011–12 | Segunda Divisão | 2 | 0 | 0 | 0 | 0 | 0 | — | | — | | 2 | 0 |
| Beira-Mar (loan) | 2012–13 | Primeira Liga | 7 | 2 | 1 | 0 | 3 | 0 | — | | — | | 11 | 2 |
| Al-Ahli | 2013–14 | Saudi Pro League | 9 | 0 | 2 | 1 | 0 | 0 | 2 | 0 | — | | 13 | 1 |
| Al-Ahli | 2014–15 | Saudi Pro League | 0 | 0 | 0 | 0 | 0 | 0 | 0 | 0 | — | | 0 | 0 |
| Al-Ahli | Total | | 9 | 0 | 2 | 1 | 0 | 0 | 2 | 0 | 0 | 0 | 13 | 3 |
| Al-Raed | 2015–16 | Saudi Pro League | 16 | 1 | 2 | 1 | 0 | 0 | — | | 1 (Note: Appearance(s) in Saudi Pro League relegation play-offs) | 1 | 19 | 3 |
| Al-Raed | 2016–17 | Saudi Pro League | 15 | 2 | 2 | 0 | 1 | 0 | — | | — | | 18 | 2 |
| Al-Raed | 2017–18 | Saudi Pro League | 15 | 3 | 1 | 0 | 0 | 0 | — | | 2 | 1 | 18 | 4 |
| Al-Raed | 2018–19 | Saudi Pro League | 25 | 16 | 3 | 4 | — | | — | | — | | 28 | 20 |
| Al-Raed | Total | | 71 | 22 | 8 | 5 | 1 | 0 | 0 | 0 | 3 | 2 | 83 | 29 |
| Al-Hilal (loan) | 2019–20 | Saudi Pro League | 20 | 4 | 4 | 3 | — | | 1 | 0 | 0 | 0 | 25 | 7 |
| Al-Hilal | 2020–21 | Saudi Pro League | 24 | 6 | 1 | 0 | — | | 5 (Note: Appearances in AFC Champions League) | 0 | 1 (Note: Appearance in Saudi Super Cup) | 0 | 31 | 6 |
| Al-Hilal | 2021–22 | Saudi Pro League | 19 | 1 | 3 | 0 | — | | 4 | 1 | 0 | 0 | 26 | 2 |
| Al-Hilal | 2022–23 | Saudi Pro League | 21 | 3 | 3 | 0 | — | | 4 | 0 | 2 (Note: One appearance in Saudi Super Cup, one appearance in FIFA Club World Cup) | 0 | 30 | 3 |
| Al-Hilal | 2023–24 | Saudi Pro League | 14 | 5 | 4 | 0 | — | | 7 | 1 | 2 | 0 | 27 | 6 |
| Al-Hilal | Total | | 98 | 19 | 15 | 3 | 0 | 0 | 21 | 2 | 5 | 0 | 139 | 24 |
| Ittihad | 2024–25 | Saudi Pro League | 11 | 3 | 2 | 3 | — | | — | | — | | 13 | 5 |
| Career total | | | 198 | 46 | 28 | 12 | 4 | 0 | 23 | 2 | 8 | 2 | 261 | 61 |

=== International ===
Statistics accurate as of match played 5 June 2026.

| National team | Year | Apps | Goals |
|---|---|---|---|
| Saudi Arabia | 2020 | 2 | 1 |
| Saudi Arabia | 2021 | 11 | 6 |
| Saudi Arabia | 2022 | 10 | 4 |
| Saudi Arabia | 2023 | 6 | 4 |
| Saudi Arabia | 2024 | 12 | 2 |
| Saudi Arabia | 2025 | 15 | 2 |
| 2026 | 3 | 0 | |
| Total | | 59 | 19 |

Scores and results list Saudi Arabia's goal tally first.

| No. | Date | Venue | Opponent | Score | Result | Competition |
|---|---|---|---|---|---|---|
| 1. | 14 November 2020 | Prince Faisal bin Fahd Stadium, Riyadh, Saudi Arabia | Jamaica | 2–0 | 3–0 | Friendly |
| 2. | 30 March 2021 | Mrsool Park, Riyadh, Saudi Arabia | Palestine | 3–0 | 5–0 | 2022 FIFA World Cup qualification |
| 3. | 30 March 2021 | Mrsool Park, Riyadh, Saudi Arabia | Palestine | 4–0 | 5–0 | 2022 FIFA World Cup qualification |
| 4. | 11 June 2021 | Mrsool Park, Riyadh, Saudi Arabia | Singapore | 3–0 | 3–0 | 2022 FIFA World Cup qualification |
| 5. | 2 September 2021 | Mrsool Park, Riyadh, Saudi Arabia | Vietnam | 3–1 | 3–1 | 2022 FIFA World Cup qualification |
| 6. | 7 September 2021 | Sultan Qaboos Sports Complex, Muscat, Oman | Oman | 1–0 | 1–0 | 2022 FIFA World Cup qualification |
| 7. | 16 November 2021 | Mỹ Đình National Stadium, Hanoi, Vietnam | Vietnam | 1–0 | 1–0 | 2022 FIFA World Cup qualification |
| 8. | 24 March 2022 | Sharjah Stadium, Sharjah, United Arab Emirates | China | 1–0 | 1–1 | 2022 FIFA World Cup qualification |
| 9. | 22 October 2022 | Zayed Sports City Stadium, Abu Dhabi, United Arab Emirates | North Macedonia | 1–0 | 1–0 | Friendly |
| 10. | 26 October 2022 | Al Nahyan Stadium, Abu Dhabi, United Arab Emirates | Albania | 1–0 | 1–1 | Friendly |
| 11. | 22 November 2022 | Lusail Iconic Stadium, Lusail, Qatar | Argentina | 1–1 | 2–1 | 2022 FIFA World Cup |
| 12. | 16 November 2023 | Prince Abdullah bin Jalawi Stadium, Hofuf, Saudi Arabia | Pakistan | 1–0 | 4–0 | 2026 FIFA World Cup qualification |
| 13. | 16 November 2023 | Prince Abdullah bin Jalawi Stadium, Hofuf, Saudi Arabia | Pakistan | 2–0 | 4–0 | 2026 FIFA World Cup qualification |
| 14. | 21 November 2023 | Amman International Stadium, Amman, Jordan | Jordan | 1–0 | 2–0 | 2026 FIFA World Cup qualification |
| 15. | 21 November 2023 | Amman International Stadium, Amman, Jordan | Jordan | 2–0 | 2–0 | 2026 FIFA World Cup qualification |
| 16. | 17 December 2024 | Al-Shabab Club Stadium, Riyadh, Saudi Arabia | Trinidad and Tobago | 1–0 | 3–1 | Friendly |
| 17. | 22 December 2024 | Jaber Al-Ahmad International Stadium, Kuwait City, Kuwait | Bahrain | 2–3 | 2–3 | 26th Arabian Gulf Cup |
| 18. | 15 June 2025 | Snapdragon Stadium, San Diego, United States | Haiti | 1–0 | 1–0 | 2025 CONCACAF Gold Cup |
| 19. | 2 December 2025 | Education City Stadium, Al Rayyan, Qatar | Oman | 2–1 | 2–1 | 2025 FIFA Arab Cup |

== Honours ==
Al-Hilal

- Saudi Pro League: 2019–20, 2020–21, 2021–22, 2023–24
- King's Cup: 2019–20, 2022–23, 2023–24
- AFC Champions League: 2019, 2021
- Saudi Super Cup: 2021, 2023

Al-Ittihad

- Saudi Pro League: 2024–25
- King's Cup: 2024–25
