= 1996 AFC Asian Cup squads =

Squad lists of 1996 AFC Asian Cup national teams

This article lists the squads for the 1996 AFC Asian Cup played in United Arab Emirates. Players marked (c) were named as captain for their national squad. Number of caps counts until the start of the tournament, including all pre-tournament friendlies. Player's age is their age on the opening day of the tournament, which was 4 December 1996.

== Group A ==
=== Indonesia ===
Head coach: (Indonesia) Muhammad Danurwindo

No.	Pos.	Player	Date of birth (age)	Caps	Goals	Club
1	GK	Kurnia Sandy	24 August 1975 (aged 21)			(Football Association of Indonesia) Pelita Jaya
2	DF	Agung Setyabudi	2 November 1972 (aged 24)			(Football Association of Indonesia) Arseto Solo
3	DF	Suwandi Siswoyo	10 March 1972 (aged 24)			(Football Association of Indonesia) Petrokimia Putra
4	DF	Yeyen Tumena	16 May 1976 (aged 20)			(Football Association of Indonesia) PSM Makassar
5	DF	Aples Gideon Tecuari	21 April 1973 (aged 23)			(Football Association of Indonesia) Persipura Jayapura
6	DF	Sudirman (captain)	24 April 1969 (aged 27)			(Football Association of Indonesia) Bandung Raya
7	FW	Widodo Putro	8 November 1970 (aged 26)			(Football Association of Indonesia) Petrokimia Putra
8	FW	Ronny Wabia	23 June 1970 (aged 26)			(Football Association of Indonesia) Persipura Jayapura
9	DF	Budiman Yunus	5 August 1972 (aged 24)			(Football Association of Indonesia) Bandung Raya
10	FW	Indriyanto Nugroho	14 September 1976 (aged 20)			(Football Association of Indonesia) Pelita Jaya
11	MF	Bima Sakti	23 January 1976 (aged 20)			(Football Association of Indonesia) Pelita Jaya
12	MF	Chris Yarangga	21 February 1973 (aged 23)			(Football Association of Indonesia) Persipura Jayapura
14	FW	Ansar Razak	18 January 1974 (aged 22)			(Football Association of Indonesia) PSM Makassar
15	MF	Francis Wewengkang	10 January 1971 (aged 25)			(Football Association of Indonesia) Persma Manado
16	DF	Marzuki Badriawan	20 October 1967 (aged 29)			(Football Association of Indonesia) Mitra Surabaya
17	DF	Ritham Madubun	1 April 1971 (aged 25)			(Football Association of Indonesia) Persipura Jayapura
18	MF	Supriyono Paimin	8 August 1975 (aged 21)			(Football Association of Indonesia) Pelita Jaya
20	GK	Hendro Kartiko	24 April 1973 (aged 23)			(Football Association of Indonesia) Mitra Surabaya

=== Kuwait ===
Head coach: (Czechoslovakia) Milan Máčala

No.	Pos.	Player	Date of birth (age)	Caps	Goals	Club
1	GK	Khaled Al-Fadhli	15 May 1974 (aged 22)			(Kuwait Football Association) Al Kuwait
2	DF	Osama Hussain	11 August 1970 (aged 26)			(Kuwait Football Association) Al Arabi
3	DF	Jamal Mubarak	21 March 1974 (aged 22)			(Kuwait Football Association) Al Qadesiya
4	DF	Yousef Al-Dokhi	2 August 1973 (aged 23)			(Kuwait Football Association) Kazma
5	DF	Mohamed Al-Kaledi (captain)	13 February 1971 (aged 25)			(Kuwait Football Association) Al Qadesiya
6	DF	Wael Sulaiman	8 August 1964 (aged 32)			(Kuwait Football Association) Jahra
7	MF	Bader Haji	19 December 1967 (aged 28)			(Kuwait Football Association) Kazma
9	FW	Bashar Abdullah	12 October 1977 (aged 19)			(Kuwait Football Association) Salmiah
10	FW	Khaled Fairouz	25 November 1966 (aged 30)			(Kuwait Football Association) Yarmook
11	MF	Abdullah Wabran	7 February 1971 (aged 25)			(Kuwait Football Association) Al Arabi
12	MF	Fawaz Al-Ahmad	9 November 1969 (aged 27)			(Kuwait Football Association) Kazma
14	MF	Ayman Al-Hussaini	22 November 1967 (aged 29)			(Kuwait Football Association) Kazma
15	DF	Ali Abdulkareem				(Kuwait Football Association) Al Kuwait
16	DF	Sami Al-Lanqawi	21 July 1972 (aged 24)			(Kuwait Football Association) Al Arabi
17	MF	Esam Sakeen	2 June 1971 (aged 25)			(Kuwait Football Association) Kazma
18	FW	Waleed Nassar	5 March 1969 (aged 27)			(Kuwait Football Association) Al Kuwait
19	FW	Hani Al-Saqer	8 January 1973 (aged 23)			(Kuwait Football Association) Al Qadesiya
20	FW	Jasem Al-Huwaidi	28 October 1972 (aged 24)			(Kuwait Football Association) Salmiah
21	GK	Falah Al-Majidi	13 November 1970 (aged 26)			(Kuwait Football Association) Jahra
22	GK	Hussain Al-Mekaimi	23 May 1968 (aged 28)			(Kuwait Football Association) Yarmook

=== South Korea ===
Head coach: (South Korea) Park Jong-hwan

No.	Pos.	Player	Date of birth (age)	Caps	Goals	Club
1	GK	Kim Byung-ji	8 April 1970 (aged 26)	14	0	(Korea Football Association) Ulsan Hyundai Horangi
2	DF	Kim Pan-keun	5 March 1966 (aged 30)	49	3	(Korea Football Association) Anyang LG Cheetahs
3	DF	Park Kwang-hyun	24 July 1967 (aged 29)	2	0	(Korea Football Association) Cheonan Ilhwa Chunma
4	DF	Kang Chul	2 November 1971 (aged 25)	32	1	(Korea Football Association) Sangmu FC
5	DF	Huh Ki-tae	13 July 1967 (aged 29)	12	0	(Korea Football Association) Bucheon Yukong
6	DF	Shin Hong-gi	4 May 1968 (aged 28)	44	3	(Korea Football Association) Ulsan Hyundai Horangi
7	MF	Shin Tae-yong	11 May 1970 (aged 26)	18	2	(Korea Football Association) Cheonan Ilhwa Chunma
8	FW	Roh Sang-rae	15 December 1970 (aged 25)	15	5	(Korea Football Association) Jeonnam Dragons
9	FW	Kim Do-hoon	21 July 1970 (aged 26)	18	8	(Korea Football Association) Jeonbuk Hyundai Dinos
11	MF	Ko Jeong-woon	27 June 1966 (aged 30)	61	9	(Korea Football Association) Cheonan Ilhwa Chunma
12	DF	Lee Ki-hyung	28 September 1974 (aged 22)	8	4	(Korea Football Association) Suwon Samsung Bluewings
13	MF	Park Nam-yeol	4 May 1970 (aged 26)	15	1	(Korea Football Association) Cheonan Ilhwa Chunma
17	DF	Ha Seok-ju	20 February 1968 (aged 28)	55	17	(Korea Football Association) Busan Daewoo Royals
18	FW	Hwang Sun-hong	14 July 1968 (aged 28)	67	39	(Korea Football Association) Pohang Atoms
19	FW	Seo Jung-won	17 December 1970 (aged 25)	52	12	(Korea Football Association) Anyang LG Cheetahs
20	DF	Hong Myung-bo	14 February 1969 (aged 27)	73	9	(Korea Football Association) Pohang Atoms
21	GK	Kim Bong-soo	4 December 1970 (aged 26)	8	0	(Korea Football Association) Anyang LG Cheetahs
22	MF	Lee Young-jin	27 March 1972 (aged 24)	5	1	(Korea Football Association) Cheonan Ilhwa Chunma
23	DF	Yoo Sang-chul	18 October 1971 (aged 25)	21	2	(Korea Football Association) Ulsan Hyundai Horangi
24	MF	Kim Joo-sung	17 January 1966 (aged 30)	73	13	(Korea Football Association) Busan Daewoo Royals

=== United Arab Emirates ===
Head coach: (Croatia) Tomislav Ivić

No.	Pos.	Player	Date of birth (age)	Caps	Goals	Club
1	GK	Juma Rashed	12 December 1972 (aged 23)			(United Arab Emirates Football Association) Al-Shabab
2	DF	Abdulrahman Ibrahim	9 November 1974 (aged 22)			(United Arab Emirates Football Association) Al-Shaab Club
3	MF	Munther Abdullah	12 January 1975 (aged 21)			(United Arab Emirates Football Association) Al-Wasl
4	DF	Abdulrahman Al-Haddad	10 November 1966 (aged 30)			(United Arab Emirates Football Association) Al-Sharjah
5	DF	Yousuf Hussain	8 July 1965 (aged 31)			(United Arab Emirates Football Association) Al-Sharjah
6	DF	Ismail Rashid Ismail	27 October 1972 (aged 24)			(United Arab Emirates Football Association) Al-Wasl
7	MF	Bakheet Saad Mubarak	15 October 1970 (aged 26)			(United Arab Emirates Football Association) Al-Shabab
10	FW	Adnan Al-Talyani (captain)	4 March 1964 (aged 32)			(United Arab Emirates Football Association) Al-Shaab Club
11	FW	Zuhair Bakhit	13 July 1967 (aged 29)			(United Arab Emirates Football Association) Al-Wasl
12	DF	Hassan Mubarak	13 April 1968 (aged 28)			(United Arab Emirates Football Association) Al-Nasr
13	MF	Abdul Aziz Mohamed	16 September 1977 (aged 19)			(United Arab Emirates Football Association) Al-Sharjah
14	FW	Khamees Saad Mubarak	4 October 1970 (aged 26)			(United Arab Emirates Football Association) Al-Shabab
15	MF	Mohamed Ali	12 December 1965 (aged 30)			(United Arab Emirates Football Association) Al Nasr
16	MF	Hassan Saeed Ahmed	15 November 1973 (aged 23)			(United Arab Emirates Football Association) Al-Ittihad Kalba
17	GK	Muhsin Musabah	1 October 1964 (aged 32)			(United Arab Emirates Football Association) Al-Sharjah
18	MF	Ahmed Ibrahim Ali	5 November 1974 (aged 22)			(United Arab Emirates Football Association) Al-Sharjah
19	FW	Kazem Ali	3 September 1978 (aged 18)			(United Arab Emirates Football Association) Al Nasr
20	FW	Sultan Rashed	5 December 1976 (aged 19)			(United Arab Emirates Football Association) Al Wasl FC
21	MF	Mohammad Omar	11 November 1976 (aged 20)			(United Arab Emirates Football Association) Al Wasl FC
23	FW	Adel Mohamed	5 November 1974 (aged 22)			(United Arab Emirates Football Association) Al-Ittihad Kalba

== Group B ==
=== Iran ===
Head coach: (Iran) Mohammad Mayeli Kohan

No.	Pos.	Player	Date of birth (age)	Caps	Goals	Club
1	GK	Ahmad Reza Abedzadeh (c)	25 May 1966 (aged 30)			(Football Federation Islamic Republic of Iran) Persepolis F.C.
2	DF	Naeem Saadavi	16 June 1969 (aged 27)			(Football Federation Islamic Republic of Iran) Persepolis F.C.
3	DF	Ali Akbar Ostad-Asadi	17 September 1965 (aged 31)			(Football Federation Islamic Republic of Iran) Zob Ahan SC
4	MF	Karim Bagheri	24 February 1974 (aged 22)			(Football Federation Islamic Republic of Iran) Persepolis F.C.
5	DF	Afshin Peyrovani	6 February 1970 (aged 26)			(Football Federation Islamic Republic of Iran) Persepolis F.C.
6	MF	Sirous Dinmohammadi	2 July 1970 (aged 26)			(Football Federation Islamic Republic of Iran) Tractor S.C.
7	MF	Ali Reza Mansourian	12 December 1971 (aged 24)			(Football Association of Singapore) Balestier Khalsa FC
8	MF	Mojtaba Moharrami	16 April 1965 (aged 31)			(Football Federation Islamic Republic of Iran) Persepolis F.C.
9	MF	Hamid Reza Estili	4 January 1967 (aged 29)			(Football Association of Singapore) Geylang International FC
10	FW	Ali Daei	21 March 1969 (aged 27)			(Qatar Football Association) Al Sadd SC
11	FW	Khodadad Azizi	22 June 1971 (aged 25)			(Football Federation Islamic Republic of Iran) Bahman F.C.
12	MF	Mehdi Mahdavikia	24 July 1977 (aged 19)			(Football Federation Islamic Republic of Iran) Persepolis F.C.
14	DF	Mohammad Khakpour	20 February 1969 (aged 27)			(Turkish Football Federation) Vanspor FK
18	DF	Farshad Falahatzadeh	21 March 1967 (aged 29)			(Football Federation Islamic Republic of Iran) Bargh Shiraz F.C.
19	MF	Ali Akbar Yousefi	12 September 1969 (aged 27)			(Football Federation Islamic Republic of Iran) Pas F.C.
20	MF	Dariush Yazdani	6 June 1977 (aged 19)			(Football Federation Islamic Republic of Iran) Payam Mashhad F.C.
21	FW	Ali Mousavi	22 April 1974 (aged 22)			(Football Federation Islamic Republic of Iran) Pas F.C.
22	GK	Nima Nakisa	1 May 1975 (aged 21)			(Football Federation Islamic Republic of Iran) Persepolis F.C.
24	FW	Alimirza Ostovari	1 June 1973 (aged 23)			(Football Federation Islamic Republic of Iran) Bargh Shiraz F.C.
25	MF	Mehrdad Minavand	30 November 1975 (aged 21)			(Football Federation Islamic Republic of Iran) Persepolis F.C.

=== Iraq ===
Head coach: (Iraq) Yahya Alwan

No.	Pos.	Player	Date of birth (age)	Caps	Goals	Club
1	GK	Emad Hashim	10 February 1969 (aged 27)			(Iraq) Al-Shorta
2	DF	Samir Kadhim	11 December 1969 (aged 26)			(Qatar Football Association) Al Wakrah
3	DF	Walid Khalid	1 January 1970 (aged 26)			(Iraq) Al-Quwa Al-Jawiya
4	DF	Jabbar Hashim	1 January 1970 (aged 26)			(Iraq) Al-Quwa Al-Jawiya
5	DF	Radhi Shenaishil (c)	11 August 1969 (aged 27)			(Qatar Football Association) Al-Ittihad
6	MF	Essam Hamad	22 October 1973 (aged 23)			(Qatar Football Association) Al-Tawun
7	MF	Khalid Mohammed Sabbar	23 February 1972 (aged 24)			(Iraq) Al-Zawraa
8	MF	Mohammed Jassim	1 January 1971 (aged 25)			(Iraq) Al-Zawraa
9	FW	Ali Wahaib	24 December 1975 (aged 20)			(Qatar Football Association) Al-Tawun
10	FW	Qahtan Chathir	20 July 1973 (aged 23)			(Iraq) Al-Talaba
11	FW	Sahib Abbas	1 January 1972 (aged 24)			(Iraq) Al-Zawraa
12	DF	Haidar Mahmoud	19 September 1973 (aged 23)			(Iraq) Al-Zawraa
14	MF	Adel Nima	26 February 1970 (aged 26)			(Iraq) Al-Talaba
15	FW	Hussam Fawzi	1 January 1974 (aged 22)			(Iraq) Al-Zawraa
16	DF	Haidar Abdul-Jabar	25 August 1976 (aged 20)			(Iraq) Al-Zawraa
17	FW	Laith Hussein	13 October 1968 (aged 28)			(Qatar Football Association) Al-Wakrah
18	DF	Hassan Matrud	1 January 1976 (aged 20)			(Iraq) Al-Shorta
19	MF	Ahmed Daham	12 October 1967 (aged 29)			(Iraq) Al-Quwa Al-Jawiya
21	GK	Ahmed Ali	1 January 1967 (aged 29)			(Iraq) Al-Zawraa
22	GK	Jalil Zaidan	2 November 1967 (aged 29)			(Iraq) Al-Quwa Al-Jawiya

=== Saudi Arabia ===
Head coach: (Portugal) Nelo Vingada

No.	Pos.	Player	Date of birth (age)	Caps	Club
1	GK	Mohammed Al Deayea	2 August 1972 (aged 24)		(Saudi Arabia) Al-Ta'ee
2	DF	Mohammed Al-Jahani	28 September 1974 (aged 22)		(Saudi Arabia) Al-Ahli
3	DF	Mohammed Al-Khilaiwi	1 September 1971 (aged 25)		(Saudi Arabia) Al-Ittihad
4	DF	Abdullah Sulaiman Zubromawi	15 November 1973 (aged 23)		(Saudi Arabia) Al-Ahli
5	DF	Ahmad Jamil Madani	6 January 1970 (aged 26)		(Saudi Arabia) Al-Ittihad
6	MF	Fuad Anwar	13 October 1970 (aged 26)		(Saudi Arabia) Al-Shabab
8	MF	Khalid Al-Temawi	19 April 1969 (aged 27)		(Saudi Arabia) Al-Hilal
9	FW	Sami Al-Jaber	11 December 1972 (aged 23)		(Saudi Arabia) Al-Hilal
10	FW	Fahad Al-Mehallel	11 November 1970 (aged 26)		(Saudi Arabia) Al-Shabab
12	MF	Ibrahim Al-Harbi	10 July 1975 (aged 21)		(Saudi Arabia) Al-Nasr
13	DF	Hussain Sulimani	21 January 1977 (aged 19)		(Saudi Arabia) Al-Ahli
14	MF	Khalid Al-Muwallid	23 November 1971 (aged 25)		(Saudi Arabia) Al-Ahli
15	FW	Youssif Al-Thunian (captain)	18 November 1963 (aged 33)		(Saudi Arabia) Al-Hilal
16	MF	Khamis Al-Owairan	8 September 1973 (aged 23)		(Saudi Arabia) Al-Hilal
17	MF	Abdullah Al-Garni	19 September 1978 (aged 18)		(Saudi Arabia) Al-Nasr
19	DF	Khalid Al-Rashaid	3 August 1974 (aged 22)		(Saudi Arabia) Al-Hilal
20	FW	Hamzah Falatah	8 October 1972 (aged 24)		(Saudi Arabia) Al-Ahli
21	GK	Hussein Al-Sadiq	15 October 1973 (aged 23)		(Saudi Arabia) Al-Qadisiya
22	GK	Tisir Al-Antaif	16 February 1974 (aged 22)		(Saudi Arabia) Ettifaq FC
24	MF	Khamis Al-Zahrani	3 August 1976 (aged 20)		(Saudi Arabia) Al-Ittihad
25	FW	Abdullah Al-Dosari	10 November 1977 (aged 19)		(Saudi Arabia) Al-Hilal

=== Thailand ===
Head coach: (Thailand) Arjhan Srong-ngamsub

No.	Pos.	Player	Date of birth (age)	Caps	Goals	Club
1	GK	Wacharapong Somcit	21 August 1975 (aged 21)			(Football Association of Thailand) Bangkok Bank F.C.
2	DF	Kritsada Piandit	17 August 1971 (aged 25)			(Football Association of Thailand) TOT S.C.
4	DF	Pattanapong Sripramote	3 February 1974 (aged 22)			(Football Association of Thailand) Raj Pracha
5	DF	Jakarat Tonhongsa	29 September 1973 (aged 23)			(Football Association of Thailand) Osotspa Saraburi F.C.
6	DF	Sanor Longsawang	2 December 1971 (aged 25)			(Football Association of Thailand) Thai Farmers Bank
7	DF	Natee Thongsookkaew	9 December 1966 (aged 29)			(Football Association of Thailand) Royal Thai Police FC
8	MF	Apichad Thaveechalermdit	10 January 1965 (aged 31)			(Football Association of Thailand) Bangkok Bank F.C.
9	FW	Netipong Srithong-In	8 September 1972 (aged 24)			(Football Association of Thailand) Thai Farmers Bank
11	FW	Yutthana Polsak	21 March 1970 (aged 26)			(Football Association of Thailand) Raj Pracha
12	MF	Surachai Jaturapattanapong	20 November 1969 (aged 27)			(Football Association of Thailand) Stock Exchange of Thailand
13	FW	Kiatisuk Senamuang	11 August 1973 (aged 23)			(Football Association of Thailand) Raj Pracha
14	FW	Worrawoot Srimaka	8 December 1971 (aged 24)			(Football Association of Thailand) BEC Tero Sasana
15	MF	Sunei Jaidee	22 May 1976 (aged 20)			(Football Association of Thailand) Royal Thai Air Force
17	DF	Dusit Chalermsan	22 April 1970 (aged 26)			(Football Association of Thailand) BEC Tero Sasana
18	GK	Nipon Malanont	10 November 1966 (aged 30)			(Football Association of Thailand) Thai Farmers Bank
19	DF	Surachai Jirasirichote	13 October 1970 (aged 26)			(Football Association of Thailand) Sinthana
20	MF	Phithaya Santawong	18 January 1967 (aged 29)			(Football Association of Thailand) Stock Exchange of Thailand
21	MF	Satit Ubolkhoa	24 March 1976 (aged 20)			(Football Association of Thailand) Krung Thai Bank
22	MF	Sing Totavee	27 August 1969 (aged 27)			(Football Association of Thailand) Thai Farmers Bank
25	MF	Sujja Sirikeat	5 January 1966 (aged 30)			(Football Association of Thailand) Thai Farmers Bank

== Group C ==
=== China ===
Head coach: (China) Qi Wusheng

No.	Pos.	Player	Date of birth (age)	Caps	Goals	Club
3	DF	Wei Qun	10 February 1971 (aged 25)	6	1	(Chinese Football Association) Sichuan Quanxing
4	DF	Zhang Enhua	28 April 1973 (aged 23)	5	0	(Chinese Football Association) Dalian Wanda
5	DF	Xu Hong (captain)	14 May 1968 (aged 28)	29	3	(Chinese Football Association) Dalian Wanda
6	DF	Fan Zhiyi	6 November 1969 (aged 27)	34	1	(Chinese Football Association) Shanghai Shenhua
7	FW	Hao Haidong	9 May 1970 (aged 26)	32	10	(Chinese Football Association) Dalian Wanda
8	MF	Ma Mingyu	4 February 1970 (aged 26)	9	2	(Chinese Football Association) Sichuan Quanxing
9	MF	Cao Xiandong	19 August 1968 (aged 28)	10	2	(Chinese Football Association) Beijing Guo'an
10	MF	Li Bing	16 March 1969 (aged 27)	35	12	(Chinese Football Association) Sichuan Quanxing
11	MF	Peng Weiguo	3 October 1971 (aged 25)	31	8	(Chinese Football Association) Guangzhou Apollo
12	FW	Su Maozhen	23 October 1971 (aged 25)	10	3	(Chinese Football Association) Shandong Luneng
13	DF	Sun Jihai	30 September 1977 (aged 19)	1	0	(Chinese Football Association) Dalian Wanda
14	MF	Jiang Feng	27 February 1970 (aged 26)	11	0	(Chinese Football Association) Liaoning F.C.
15	MF	Han Jinming	28 February 1969 (aged 27)	3	0	(Chinese Football Association) Tianjin Samsung
16	MF	Li Ming	26 January 1971 (aged 25)	25	0	(Chinese Football Association) Dalian Wanda
17	FW	Gao Feng	22 April 1971 (aged 25)	17	4	(Chinese Football Association) Beijing Guo'an
19	DF	Wu Chengying	21 April 1975 (aged 21)	0	0	(Chinese Football Association) Shanghai Shenhua
20	GK	Ou Chuliang	26 August 1968 (aged 28)	31	0	(Chinese Football Association) Guangdong Hongyuan
21	DF	Liu Yue	12 July 1975 (aged 21)	7	0	(Chinese Football Association) Shandong Luneng
22	GK	Han Wenhai	28 January 1971 (aged 25)	0	0	(Chinese Football Association) Dalian Wanda
23	FW	Xie Hui	14 February 1975 (aged 21)	0	0	(Chinese Football Association) Shanghai Shenhua

=== Japan ===
Head coach: (Japan) Shu Kamo

No.	Pos.	Player	Date of birth (age)	Caps	Goals	Club
1	GK	Nobuyuki Kojima	17 January 1966 (aged 30)			(Japan Football Association) Bellmare Hiratsuka
2	DF	Hiroshige Yanagimoto	15 October 1972 (aged 24)			(Japan Football Association) Sanfrecce Hiroshima
3	DF	Naoki Soma	19 July 1971 (aged 25)			(Japan Football Association) Kashima Antlers
4	DF	Masami Ihara	18 September 1967 (aged 29)			(Japan Football Association) Yokohama Marinos
5	DF	Norio Omura	6 September 1969 (aged 27)			(Japan Football Association) Yokohama Marinos
6	MF	Motohiro Yamaguchi	29 January 1969 (aged 27)			(Japan Football Association) Yokohama Flugels
7	MF	Yasuto Honda	25 June 1969 (aged 27)			(Japan Football Association) Kashima Antlers
8	MF	Masakiyo Maezono	29 October 1973 (aged 23)			(Japan Football Association) Yokohama Flugels
9	FW	Takuya Takagi	12 November 1967 (aged 29)			(Japan Football Association) Sanfrecce Hiroshima
10	MF	Hiroshi Nanami	28 November 1972 (aged 24)			(Japan Football Association) Jubilo Iwata
11	FW	Kazuyoshi Miura	26 February 1967 (aged 29)			(Japan Football Association) Verdy Kawasaki
12	DF	Ryuji Michiki	25 August 1973 (aged 23)			(Japan Football Association) Sanfrecce Hiroshima
13	MF	Toshihiro Hattori	23 September 1973 (aged 23)			(Japan Football Association) Jubilo Iwata
14	MF	Masayuki Okano	25 July 1972 (aged 24)			(Japan Football Association) Urawa Reds
15	MF	Hiroaki Morishima	30 April 1972 (aged 24)			(Japan Football Association) Cerezo Osaka
16	DF	Toshihide Saito	20 April 1973 (aged 23)			(Japan Football Association) Shimizu S-Pulse
17	DF	Yutaka Akita	6 August 1970 (aged 26)			(Japan Football Association) Kashima Antlers
18	FW	Shoji Jo	17 June 1975 (aged 21)			(Japan Football Association) JEF United Ichihara
19	GK	Kenichi Shimokawa	14 May 1970 (aged 26)			(Japan Football Association) JEF United Ichihara
20	GK	Seigo Narazaki	15 April 1976 (aged 20)			(Japan Football Association) Yokohama Flugels

=== Syria ===
Head coach: (Belarus) Yuriy Kurnenin

No.	Pos.	Player	Date of birth (age)	Caps	Goals	Club
1	GK	Maher Berakdar	26 March 1968 (aged 28)			(Syrian Football Association) Al-Karamah SC
2	DF	Yasser Sibai	6 February 1972 (aged 24)			(Lebanese Football Association) Al-Safa' SC
3	DF	Bashar Srour	25 May 1973 (aged 23)			(Syrian Football Association) Tishreen SC
4	MF	Hassan Abbas	24 January 1974 (aged 22)			(Syrian Football Association) Al-Karamah SC
5	DF	Tarek Jabban	11 December 1975 (aged 20)			(Syrian Football Association) Al-Jaish SC
6	DF	Ammar Awad	10 October 1972 (aged 24)			(Syrian Football Association) Hutteen SC
7	MF	Abdel Kader Rifai	18 April 1973 (aged 23)			(Syrian Football Association) Al-Karamah SC
8	MF	Nihad Al Boushi	28 September 1975 (aged 21)			(Russian Football Union) Krylia Sovetov
9	MF	Loay Taleb	9 August 1975 (aged 21)			(Syrian Football Association) Al-Wahda SC
10	MF	Mohammad Afash	31 October 1966 (aged 30)			(Hellenic Football Federation) Ionikos FC
12	MF	Ali Cheikh Dib	7 May 1972 (aged 24)			(Syrian Football Association) Al Hurriya SC
13	MF	Abdul Latif Helou	8 September 1971 (aged 25)			(Syrian Football Association) Al Hurriya SC
14	MF	Khaled Zaher	2 September 1972 (aged 24)			(Syrian Football Association) Al Hurriya SC
15	FW	Hatem Ghaeb	25 September 1971 (aged 25)			(Syrian Football Association) Al-Shorta
16	FW	Nader Joukhadar	19 October 1977 (aged 19)			(Syrian Football Association) Al-Wathba SC
17	MF	Ammar Rihawi	20 June 1975 (aged 21)			(Syrian Football Association) Al-Ittihad SC
18	FW	Ammar Shamali	1 January 1970 (aged 26)			(Syrian Football Association) Jableh SC
23	MF	Ahmed Kurdughli	25 September 1975 (aged 21)			(Syrian Football Association) Tishreen SC
24	GK	Salem Bitar	7 August 1973 (aged 23)			(Egyptian Football Association) El-Maaden
25	GK	Abdul Fattah Kader	2 August 1975 (aged 21)			

=== Uzbekistan ===
Head coach: (Uzbekistan) Bokhodyr Ibragimov

No.	Pos.	Player	Date of birth (age)	Caps	Goals	Club
1	GK	Pavel Bugalo	21 August 1974 (aged 22)			(Uzbekistan Football Association) Pakhtakor Tashkent
2	DF	Fevzi Davletov	20 September 1972 (aged 24)			(Uzbekistan Football Association) MHSK Tashkent
3	DF	Ulugbek Ruzimov	15 August 1968 (aged 28)			(Uzbekistan Football Association) Pakhtakor Tashkent
4	DF	Farkhad Magametov (captain)	11 January 1962 (aged 34)			(Uzbekistan Football Association) Navbahor Namangan
5	DF	Eduard Momotov	22 January 1970 (aged 26)			(Uzbekistan Football Association) Navbahor Namangan
6	DF	Ilkhom Sharipov	24 February 1968 (aged 28)			(Uzbekistan Football Association) Navbahor Namangan
7	MF	Stepan Atayan	13 July 1966 (aged 30)			(Hellenic Football Federation) Proodeftiki
8	MF	Sergey Lebedev	31 January 1969 (aged 27)			(Uzbekistan Football Association) FK Neftchy Farg'ona
9	FW	Ravshan Bozorov	10 May 1968 (aged 28)			(Uzbekistan Football Association) FK Neftchy Farg'ona
10	FW	Igor Shkvyrin	29 April 1963 (aged 33)			(Israel Football Association) Hapoel Tel Aviv
11	FW	Oleg Shatskikh	15 October 1974 (aged 22)			(Uzbekistan Football Association) Navbahor Namangan
13	FW	Zafardyon Musabayev	15 October 1975 (aged 21)			(Uzbekistan Football Association) Navbahor Namangan
14	DF	Nikolay Shirshov	22 June 1974 (aged 22)			(Uzbekistan Football Association) Pakhtakor Tashkent
15	DF	Andrei Fyodorov	10 April 1971 (aged 25)			(Uzbekistan Football Association) FK Neftchy Farg'ona
16	DF	Hienadz Dzyanisaw	20 August 1960 (aged 36)			(Uzbekistan Football Association) Navbahor Namangan
17	FW	Numon Khasanov	10 February 1971 (aged 25)			(Uzbekistan Football Association) MHSK Tashkent
19	FW	Azamat Abduraimov	27 April 1966 (aged 30)			(Uzbekistan Football Association) Pakhtakor Tashkent
20	MF	Dilmurod Nazarov	12 April 1976 (aged 20)			(Uzbekistan Football Association) Pakhtakor Tashkent
21	GK	Dmitriy Bashkevich	26 February 1968 (aged 28)			(Uzbekistan Football Association) Navbahor Namangan
23	DF	Aleksey Semyonov	7 July 1968 (aged 28)			(Uzbekistan Football Association) FK Neftchy Farg'ona
