= Football at the 1994 Asian Games – Men's team squads =

Below are the squads for the men's football tournament at the 1994 Asian Games, played in Hiroshima, Japan.

== Group A ==
=== Bahrain ===
Coach: (Federal Republic of Yugoslavia) Ivan Čabrinović

No.	Pos.	Player	Date of birth (age)	Club
1	GK	Ali Hassan Al-Thani	16 August 1972 (aged 22)	(Bahrain Football Association) Al-Muharraq
2	DF	Abdulrazaq Mohamed		(Bahrain Football Association) Al-Manama
3	DF	Ali Jawhar		
5	MF	Sameer Al-Hammadi		
6	MF	Khalid Al-Doseri		
7	FW	Hameed Darwish		
8	MF	Khalid Jasim		
10	MF	Mohamed Saleh Al-Dakheel		(Bahrain Football Association) Al-Muharraq
11	FW	Adel Al-Marzouqi		
12	DF	Moosa Abdulla		
15	DF	Khamis Eid	20 October 1966 (aged 27)	
17	DF	Fayad Mahmoud		(Bahrain Football Association) Al-Wehda
21	GK	Mohamed Ali Hassan		

=== China ===
Coach: Qi Wusheng

No.	Pos.	Player	Date of birth (age)	Club
1	GK	Xu Tao	13 March 1965 (aged 29)	(Chinese Football Association) Liaoning Yuandong
2	DF	Wei Kexing	13 February 1963 (aged 31)	(Chinese Football Association) Beijing Guoan
3	MF	Jiang Feng	27 February 1970 (aged 24)	(Chinese Football Association) Liaoning Yuandong
4	DF	Fan Zhiyi	22 January 1970 (aged 24)	(Chinese Football Association) Shanghai Shenhua
5	DF	Xu Hong	14 May 1968 (aged 26)	(Chinese Football Association) Dalian Wanda
6	FW	Li Bing	16 March 1969 (aged 25)	(Chinese Football Association) Liaoning Yuandong
7	DF	Wang Dongning	13 April 1961 (aged 33)	(Chinese Football Association) Shandong Taishan
8	MF	Gao Zhongxun	4 January 1965 (aged 29)	(Chinese Football Association) Jilin Samsung
10	FW	Wang Tao	22 April 1970 (aged 24)	(Chinese Football Association) Dalian Wanda
11	FW	Gao Feng	22 April 1971 (aged 23)	(Chinese Football Association) Beijing Guoan
12	MF	Xie Yuxin	12 October 1968 (aged 25)	(Chinese Football Association) Guangdong Winnerway
13	MF	Li Ming	26 January 1971 (aged 23)	(Chinese Football Association) Dalian Wanda
14	FW	Hu Zhijun	24 July 1970 (aged 24)	(Chinese Football Association) Guangzhou Apollo
15	FW	Li Xiao	17 July 1967 (aged 27)	(Chinese Football Association) Shanghai Shenhua
16	DF	Jin Guangzhu	7 April 1968 (aged 26)	(Chinese Football Association) Jilin Samsung
17	MF	Peng Weiguo	3 October 1971 (aged 22)	(Chinese Football Association) Guangzhou Apollo
18	MF	Cao Xiandong	19 August 1968 (aged 26)	(Chinese Football Association) Beijing Guoan
20	GK	Ou Chuliang	26 August 1968 (aged 26)	(Chinese Football Association) Guangdong Winnerway

=== Iran ===
Coach: (Croatia) Stanko Poklepović

No.	Pos.	Player	Date of birth (age)	Club
1	GK	Behzad Gholampour	23 December 1966 (aged 27)	(Football Federation Islamic Republic of Iran) Esteghlal Tehran
2	DF	Javad Zarincheh	23 July 1966 (aged 28)	(Football Federation Islamic Republic of Iran) Esteghlal Tehran
3	DF	Sadegh Varmazyar	21 March 1966 (aged 28)	(Football Federation Islamic Republic of Iran) Esteghlal Tehran
4	DF	Afshin Peyrovani	6 February 1970 (aged 24)	(Football Federation Islamic Republic of Iran) Persepolis Tehran
5	DF	Nader Mohammadkhani	23 August 1963 (aged 31)	(Football Federation Islamic Republic of Iran) Bahman Tehran
6	DF	Reza Shahroudi	21 February 1972 (aged 22)	(Football Federation Islamic Republic of Iran) Persepolis Tehran
7	MF	Behzad Dadashzadeh	22 June 1971 (aged 23)	(Football Federation Islamic Republic of Iran) Persepolis Tehran
8	MF	Amir Ghalenoei	21 November 1963 (aged 30)	(Football Federation Islamic Republic of Iran) Esteghlal Tehran
9	DF	Javad Manafi	23 September 1970 (aged 24)	(Football Federation Islamic Republic of Iran) Persepolis Tehran
10	FW	Ali Daei	21 March 1969 (aged 25)	(Football Federation Islamic Republic of Iran) Persepolis Tehran
11	MF	Iman Alami	24 February 1968 (aged 26)	(Football Federation Islamic Republic of Iran) Esteghlal Tehran
12	MF	Mojtaba Moharrami	16 April 1965 (aged 29)	(Football Federation Islamic Republic of Iran) Persepolis Tehran
13	MF	Ali Eftekhari	12 January 1964 (aged 30)	(Football Federation Islamic Republic of Iran) Saipa Tehran
14	MF	Karim Bagheri	20 February 1974 (aged 20)	(Football Federation Islamic Republic of Iran) Keshavarz Tehran
15	MF	Hassan Shirmohammadi	22 May 1968 (aged 26)	(Football Federation Islamic Republic of Iran) Persepolis Tehran
16	FW	Ali Asghar Modir-Rousta	25 July 1968 (aged 26)	(Football Federation Islamic Republic of Iran) Keshavarz Tehran
17	FW	Farshad Pious	12 January 1962 (aged 32)	(Football Federation Islamic Republic of Iran) Persepolis Tehran
18	FW	Jamshid Shahmohammadi	2 July 1968 (aged 26)	(Football Federation Islamic Republic of Iran) Persepolis Tehran
19	MF	Mohammad Salek-Jabbari		(Football Federation Islamic Republic of Iran) Saipa Tehran
20	GK	Jalal Basharzad	24 January 1964 (aged 30)	(Football Federation Islamic Republic of Iran) Saipa Tehran

=== Turkmenistan ===
Coach: Täçmyrat Agamyradow

No.	Pos.	Player	Date of birth (age)	Club
1	GK	Aleksandr Korobko	16 January 1970 (aged 24)	(Football Federation of Turkmenistan) Köpetdag Aşgabat
2	DF	Çaryýarguly Seýdiýew	11 August 1962 (aged 32)	(Football Federation of Turkmenistan) Köpetdag Aşgabat
4	DF	Ýewgeniý Sysoýew	3 May 1974 (aged 20)	(Football Federation of Turkmenistan) Köpetdag Aşgabat
5	DF	Ýuriý Bordolimow	24 January 1970 (aged 24)	(Football Federation of Turkmenistan) Nisa Aşgabat
6	MF	Gurbangeldi Durdyýew	12 January 1973 (aged 21)	(Football Federation of Turkmenistan) Köpetdag Aşgabat
7	MF	Kamil Mingazow	21 June 1968 (aged 26)	(Football Federation of Turkmenistan) Köpetdag Aşgabat
8	MF	Witaliý Zolotuhin	29 June 1970 (aged 24)	(Football Federation of Turkmenistan) Köpetdag Aşgabat
9	FW	Röwşen Muhadow	23 September 1961 (aged 33)	(Kazakhstan Football Federation) Yelimay Semipalatinsk
10	FW	Çaryýar Muhadow	12 November 1969 (aged 24)	(Football Federation of Turkmenistan) Köpetdag Aşgabat
11	FW	Berdimyrat Nurmyradow	28 August 1968 (aged 26)	(Football Federation of Turkmenistan) Köpetdag Aşgabat
13	MF	Aman Meredow	25 June 1966 (aged 28)	(Football Federation of Turkmenistan) Köpetdag Aşgabat
14	DF	Dmitriý Korž	29 October 1971 (aged 22)	(Football Federation of Turkmenistan) Köpetdag Aşgabat
15	DF	Witaliý Teplýakow	8 November 1969 (aged 24)	(Football Federation of Turkmenistan) Nisa Aşgabat
16	FW	Rejepmyrat Agabaýew	1 August 1973 (aged 21)	(Football Federation of Turkmenistan) Nisa Aşgabat
17	DF	Amandurdy Annadurdyýew	11 February 1967 (aged 27)	(Football Federation of Turkmenistan) Köpetdag Aşgabat
18	DF	Rahym Gurbanmämmedow	3 November 1963 (aged 30)	(Football Federation of Turkmenistan) Köpetdag Aşgabat

=== Yemen ===
Coach: (Brazil) Humberto Redes

No.	Pos.	Player	Date of birth (age)	Club
	GK	Aref Abdorabo		
	MF	Ahmed Al-Barid	15 February 1974 (aged 20)	
	DF	Jamal Al-Khorabi		
	DF	Saleh Ben Rabiah	14 May 1973 (aged 21)	
	FW	Esam Dariban	11 June 1974 (aged 20)	

== Group B ==
=== Hong Kong ===
Coach: (Malaysia) Koo Luam Khen

No.	Pos.	Player	Date of birth (age)	Club
1	GK	Chung Ho Yin	15 April 1971 (aged 23)	(Football Association of Hong Kong, China) Kui Tan
2	DF	Chan Chi Keung		(Football Association of Hong Kong, China) Eastern
3	DF	Yau Kin Wai	4 January 1973 (aged 21)	(Football Association of Hong Kong, China) South China
4	DF	Chiu Chun Ming	8 July 1964 (aged 30)	(Football Association of Hong Kong, China) Eastern
5	DF	Yan Lik Kin	13 July 1961 (aged 33)	(Football Association of Hong Kong, China) Rangers
6	MF	Lo Kai Wah	27 January 1971 (aged 23)	(Football Association of Hong Kong, China) Eastern
7	MF	Chan Chi Kwong	19 October 1964 (aged 29)	(Football Association of Hong Kong, China) Instant-Dict
8	MF	Tam Siu Wai	17 September 1970 (aged 24)	(Football Association of Hong Kong, China) Eastern
9	FW	Tim Bredbury	25 April 1963 (aged 31)	(Football Association of Hong Kong, China) Sing Tao
10	FW	Au Wai Lun	14 August 1971 (aged 23)	(Football Association of Hong Kong, China) South China
11	MF	Lee Kin Wo	20 October 1967 (aged 26)	(Football Association of Hong Kong, China) Eastern
12	MF	Chiu Chung Man	7 October 1969 (aged 24)	(Football Association of Hong Kong, China) South China
13	DF	Lee Wai Man	18 October 1973 (aged 20)	(Football Association of Hong Kong, China) Rangers
14	MF	Law Wai Chi	24 December 1965 (aged 28)	(Football Association of Hong Kong, China) South China
15	FW	Alan Reis		(Football Association of Hong Kong, China) Eastern
16	DF	Shum Kwok Pui	11 August 1970 (aged 24)	(Football Association of Hong Kong, China) South China
17	GK	Mak Kwok Fai		(Football Association of Hong Kong, China) Golden
18	FW	Lam Hing Lun	17 April 1967 (aged 27)	(Football Association of Hong Kong, China) Instant-Dict

=== Malaysia ===
Coach: (France) Claude Le Roy

No.	Pos.	Player	Date of birth (age)	Club
1	GK	Khairul Azman Mohamed	5 March 1968 (aged 26)	(Football Association of Malaysia) Pahang
2	MF	Jawahir Saliman	4 November 1975 (aged 18)	
3	DF	Faizal Zainal	12 February 1974 (aged 20)	(Football Association of Malaysia) Negeri Sembilan
4	DF	Azaruddin Aziz	7 January 1971 (aged 23)	(Football Association of Malaysia) Pahang
5	DF	Chong King Kong	22 April 1971 (aged 23)	
7	MF	Ong Kim Swee	11 December 1970 (aged 23)	(Football Association of Malaysia) Sabah
9	FW	Dollah Salleh	23 October 1963 (aged 30)	(Football Association of Malaysia) Pahang
10	FW	Mohd Hashim Mustapha	31 January 1966 (aged 28)	(Football Association of Malaysia) Kelantan
12	MF	Azizol Abu Haniffah	18 February 1960 (aged 34)	(Football Association of Malaysia) Perak
13	FW	Shahrin Majid	23 July 1969 (aged 25)	
14	DF	Roslan Hamid	3 June 1966 (aged 28)	
15	DF	Asroff Hanafiah	3 March 1972 (aged 22)	
19	FW	Azman Adnan	1 November 1971 (aged 22)	(Football Association of Malaysia) Selangor
	DF	Khairul Anuar Baharom	26 April 1974 (aged 20)	
	FW	Faridzuan Che Hamid	7 September 1971 (aged 23)	
	DF	Maniam Pachaiappan	6 October 1968 (aged 25)	(Football Association of Malaysia) Selangor
	MF	K. Sanbagamaran	19 February 1972 (aged 22)	(Football Association of Malaysia) Selangor
	FW	S. Thanasegar	11 May 1971 (aged 23)	
	GK	Mazlan Wahid	18 March 1967 (aged 27)	(Football Association of Malaysia) Sarawak
	MF	Yap Wai Loon	22 December 1969 (aged 24)	(Football Association of Malaysia) Kuala Lumpur

=== Saudi Arabia ===
Coach: (Brazil) Ivo Wortmann

No.	Pos.	Player	Date of birth (age)	Club
1	GK	Turki Al-Awad		(Saudi Arabian Football Federation) Al-Hilal
2	DF	Mohammed Al-Jahani	28 September 1974 (aged 20)	(Saudi Arabian Football Federation) Al-Ahli
3	DF	Ahmed Khreesh		
4	DF	Kamal Hawsawi	21 September 1974 (aged 20)	
5	DF	Abdullah Zubromawi	15 November 1973 (aged 20)	(Saudi Arabian Football Federation) Al-Ahli
7	FW	Saud Al-Qanat		(Saudi Arabian Football Federation) Al-Shabab
8	DF	Suliman Al-Mesiter		
9	FW	Hamed Al-Johani		
10	MF	Mohammed Lutf	27 November 1974 (aged 19)	(Saudi Arabian Football Federation) Al-Hilal
11	FW	Obeid Al-Dosari	2 October 1975 (aged 19)	(Saudi Arabian Football Federation) Al-Wehda
12	MF	Hussein Al-Massari		
13	MF	Hani Amin		
14	MF	Khalid Al-Shenaif		(Saudi Arabian Football Federation) Al-Shabab
16	MF	Khamis Al-Dosari	8 September 1973 (aged 21)	(Saudi Arabian Football Federation) Al-Hilal
17	DF	Zaid Al-Muwallad	1 June 1976 (aged 18)	
18	MF	Hussein Al-Harbi		
19	FW	Khalid Thaar Al-Dosari		
20	GK	Ibrahim Al-Helwah	18 August 1972 (aged 22)	(Saudi Arabian Football Federation) Al-Riyadh

=== Thailand ===
Coach: Chatchai Paholpat

No.	Pos.	Player	Date of birth (age)	Club
1	GK	Wacharapong Somcit	21 August 1975 (aged 19)	
3	DF	Kovid Foythong	20 April 1974 (aged 20)	
4	DF	Pattanapong Sripramote	3 February 1974 (aged 20)	(Football Association of Thailand) Rajpracha
5	DF	Chukiat Noosarung	25 June 1971 (aged 23)	(Football Association of Thailand) Rajpracha
8	MF	Thawatchai Damrong-ongtrakul	25 June 1974 (aged 20)	(Football Association of Thailand) Osotsapa
10	MF	Tawan Sripan	13 December 1971 (aged 22)	(Football Association of Thailand) Raj-Vithi
11	MF	Saman Deesunthai	10 May 1974 (aged 20)	
12	FW	Somrit Ornsomjit	11 February 1970 (aged 24)	
13	FW	Kiatisuk Senamuang	11 August 1973 (aged 21)	(Football Association of Thailand) Krung Thai Bank
14	MF	Rungphet Charoenwong	12 March 1974 (aged 20)	
16	MF	Suchin Phanpraphast	21 July 1974 (aged 20)	
17	MF	Dusit Chalermsan	22 April 1970 (aged 24)	(Football Association of Thailand) Sasana Witthaya School
18	GK	Sarawut Kambua	21 July 1972 (aged 22)	
20	DF	Choketawee Promrut	16 March 1975 (aged 19)	(Football Association of Thailand) Thai Farmers Bank
7	DF	Sirisak Kadalee	18 October 1973 (aged 20)	
	MF	Kitti Soraro		
6	MF	Apichad Thaveechalermdit	10 January 1965 (aged 29)	(Football Association of Thailand) Royal Thai Army

=== Uzbekistan ===
Coach: Rustam Akramov

No.	Pos.	Player	Date of birth (age)	Club
1	GK	Yuriy Sheykin	29 April 1963 (aged 31)	(Uzbekistan Football Association) Traktor Tashkent
2	DF	Fevzi Davletov	20 September 1972 (aged 22)	(Uzbekistan Football Association) MHSK Tashkent
3	DF	Andrei Fyodorov	10 April 1971 (aged 23)	(Uzbekistan Football Association) Neftchi Fergana
4	MF	Mirjalol Qosimov	17 September 1970 (aged 24)	(Russian Football Union) Alania Vladikavkaz
5	DF	Farkhad Magametov	11 January 1962 (aged 32)	(Uzbekistan Football Association) Navbahor Namangan
6	DF	Ilkhom Sharipov	24 February 1968 (aged 26)	(Uzbekistan Football Association) Pakhtakor Tashkent
7	MF	Abdukahhor Marifaliev	10 May 1971 (aged 23)	(Uzbekistan Football Association) Pakhtakor Tashkent
8	MF	Sergey Lebedev	31 January 1969 (aged 25)	(Uzbekistan Football Association) Neftchi Fergana
9	FW	Igor Shkvyrin	29 April 1963 (aged 31)	(Israel Football Association) Maccabi Netanya
10	FW	Azamat Abduraimov	27 April 1966 (aged 28)	(Football Association of Malaysia) Pahang
11	MF	Shukhrat Maqsudov	14 September 1970 (aged 24)	(Uzbekistan Football Association) Pakhtakor Tashkent
12	FW	Rustam Durmonov	28 January 1969 (aged 25)	(Uzbekistan Football Association) Neftchi Fergana
13	MF	Abdusamat Durmonov	15 November 1965 (aged 28)	(Uzbekistan Football Association) Neftchi Fergana
14	DF	Ulugbek Ruzimov	15 August 1968 (aged 26)	(Uzbekistan Football Association) Pakhtakor Tashkent
15	MF	Stepan Atayan	13 July 1966 (aged 28)	(Uzbekistan Football Association) Neftchi Fergana
16	GK	Berdakh Allaniyazov	28 September 1965 (aged 29)	(Uzbekistan Football Association) Orol Nukus
17	DF	Aleksandr Tikhonov	19 April 1965 (aged 29)	(Uzbekistan Football Association) Neftchi Fergana

== Group C ==
=== Kuwait ===
Coach: (Ukraine) Valeriy Lobanovskyi

No.	Pos.	Player	Date of birth (age)	Club
1	GK	Hussain Al-Mekaimi	23 May 1968 (aged 26)	(Kuwait Football Association) Al-Yarmouk
2	DF	Ali Falah Sadoun		
3	DF	Khaled Jarallah		
4	DF	Yousef Al-Dokhi	2 August 1973 (aged 21)	(Kuwait Football Association) Kazma
5	MF	Mohammad Al-Adwani		
6	DF	Wael Sulaiman	8 August 1964 (aged 30)	(Kuwait Football Association) Al-Jahra
7	MF	Naser Al-Sohi	24 August 1974 (aged 20)	(Kuwait Football Association) Al-Tadhamon
8	MF	Obaid Al-Shammari	19 January 1965 (aged 29)	(Kuwait Football Association) Al-Qadsia
9	FW	Ali Marwi	14 October 1969 (aged 24)	(Kuwait Football Association) Al-Salmiya
10	FW	Nawaf Jadid Al-Enezi		(Kuwait Football Association) Al-Jahra
11	MF	Bashir Salboukh		(Kuwait Football Association) Al-Tadhamon
12	MF	Fawaz Al-Ahmad	9 November 1969 (aged 24)	(Kuwait Football Association) Kazma
13	DF	Abdullah Al-Dousari		
14	DF	Mohammad Edailem		(Kuwait Football Association) Al-Arabi
16	FW	Nawaf Al-Dhafairi	16 July 1971 (aged 23)	
18	MF	Ayman Al-Hussaini	22 November 1967 (aged 26)	(Kuwait Football Association) Kazma
19	DF	Salamah Al-Enezi	13 August 1972 (aged 22)	
20	MF	Mansour Basha	3 September 1970 (aged 24)	(Kuwait Football Association) Al-Arabi
21	GK	Falah Al-Majidi	13 November 1970 (aged 23)	(Kuwait Football Association) Al-Jahra
22	GK	Khaled Al-Fadhli	15 May 1974 (aged 20)	(Kuwait Football Association) Kazma

=== Nepal ===
Coach: Dhan Bahadur Basnet

No.	Pos.	Player	Date of birth (age)	Club
3	DF	Dev Narayan Chaudhari	13 February 1972 (aged 22)	
4	DF	Rajesh Thapa		
6	MF	Raju Kaji Shakya	7 July 1960 (aged 34)	
7	MF	Umesh Pradhan		
8	MF	Jeevan Bal Lama		
9	MF	Basanta Raj Gurung		
11	FW	Suryaman Shrestha		
12	MF	Deepak Amatya		
13	DF	Sunil Prajapati		
15	DF	Gyanendra Prasad Sherchan		
18	DF	Puspa Raj		
20	GK	Mrigendra Prasad Mishra		

=== Oman ===
Coach: (Iran) Heshmat Mohajerani

No.	Pos.	Player	Date of birth (age)	Club
2	DF	Mohammed Khamis Al-Araimi	16 December 1971 (aged 22)	
4	DF	Adel Al-Mukhaini	8 November 1974 (aged 19)	
6	MF	Abdullah Hamdan Al-Moamari		
8	FW	Nabil Mubarak Al-Siyabi		
9	MF	Tayeb Abdulnoor		
10	MF	Matar Khalifa Al-Mukhaini	5 October 1971 (aged 22)	
11	FW	Saeed Al-Busaidi	10 September 1974 (aged 20)	
12	MF	Saif Al-Habsi		
15	MF	Ahmed Khamis Al-Mazrouei	27 November 1971 (aged 22)	
17	FW	Mohammed Khamis Rabza		
18	MF	Dawood Salim		
19	DF	Zahir Salim		
20	GK	Juma Saleh Al-Ghilani	30 January 1967 (aged 27)	

=== South Korea ===
Coach: (Russia) Anatoliy Byshovets

No.	Pos.	Player	Date of birth (age)	Club
1	GK	Cha Sang-kwang	31 May 1963 (aged 31)	(Korea Football Association) Yukong Elephants
2	DF	Kang Chul	2 November 1971 (aged 22)	(Korea Football Association) Yukong Elephants
4	DF	Choi Young-il	25 April 1966 (aged 28)	(Korea Football Association) Hyundai Horangi
5	DF	Lee Kyung-chun	14 April 1969 (aged 25)	(Korea Football Association) Chonbuk Buffalo
6	MF	Lee Young-jin	27 October 1963 (aged 30)	(Korea Football Association) LG Cheetahs
7	MF	Choi Dae-shik	10 January 1965 (aged 29)	(Korea Football Association) LG Cheetahs
8	MF	Choi Moon-sik	6 January 1971 (aged 23)	(Korea Football Association) POSCO Atoms
9	FW	Kim Do-hoon	21 July 1970 (aged 24)	(Korea Football Association) Sangmu
10	FW	Ko Jeong-woon	27 June 1966 (aged 28)	(Korea Football Association) Ilhwa Chunma
11	FW	Seo Jung-won	17 December 1970 (aged 23)	(Korea Football Association) Sangmu
12	MF	Cho Jin-ho	2 August 1973 (aged 21)	(Korea Football Association) POSCO Atoms
13	MF	Noh Jung-yoon	28 March 1971 (aged 23)	(Japan Football Association) Sanfrecce Hiroshima
14	MF	Park Nam-yeol	4 May 1970 (aged 24)	(Korea Football Association) Ilhwa Chunma
15	MF	Yoo Sang-chul	16 February 1973 (aged 21)	(Korea Football Association) Hyundai Horangi
16	MF	Han Jung-kook	19 July 1971 (aged 23)	(Korea Football Association) Ilhwa Chunma
17	DF	Lee Lim-saeng	18 November 1971 (aged 22)	(Korea Football Association) Yukong Elephants
18	FW	Hwang Sun-hong	14 July 1968 (aged 26)	(Korea Football Association) POSCO Atoms
19	MF	Ha Seok-ju	20 February 1968 (aged 26)	(Korea Football Association) Daewoo Royals
20	DF	Hong Myung-bo	12 February 1969 (aged 25)	(Korea Football Association) POSCO Atoms
21	GK	Shin Bum-chul	27 September 1970 (aged 24)	(Korea Football Association) Daewoo Royals

== Group D ==
=== Japan ===
Coach: (Brazil) Paulo Roberto Falcão

No.	Pos.	Player	Date of birth (age)	Club
1	GK	Shinkichi Kikuchi	12 April 1967 (aged 27)	(Japan Football Association) Verdy Kawasaki
2	DF	Yoshiro Moriyama	9 November 1967 (aged 26)	(Japan Football Association) Sanfrecce Hiroshima
3	DF	Yoshihiro Natsuka	7 October 1969 (aged 24)	(Japan Football Association) Bellmare Hiratsuka
4	DF	Masami Ihara	18 September 1967 (aged 27)	(Japan Football Association) Yokohama Marinos
5	MF	Tetsuji Hashiratani	15 July 1964 (aged 30)	(Japan Football Association) Verdy Kawasaki
6	DF	Masahiro Endo	15 August 1970 (aged 24)	(Japan Football Association) Júbilo Iwata
7	MF	Masakiyo Maezono	29 October 1973 (aged 20)	(Japan Football Association) Yokohama Flügels
8	MF	Tsuyoshi Kitazawa	10 August 1968 (aged 26)	(Japan Football Association) Verdy Kawasaki
9	FW	Nobuhiro Takeda	10 May 1967 (aged 27)	(Japan Football Association) Verdy Kawasaki
10	MF	Teruo Iwamoto	2 May 1972 (aged 22)	(Japan Football Association) Bellmare Hiratsuka
11	FW	Kazuyoshi Miura	26 February 1967 (aged 27)	(Italian Football Federation) Genoa
12	DF	Akira Narahashi	26 November 1971 (aged 22)	(Japan Football Association) Bellmare Hiratsuka
13	DF	Yutaka Akita	6 August 1970 (aged 24)	(Japan Football Association) Kashima Antlers
14	DF	Naoto Otake	18 October 1968 (aged 25)	(Japan Football Association) Yokohama Flügels
15	MF	Tetsuya Asano	23 February 1967 (aged 27)	(Japan Football Association) Nagoya Grampus Eight
16	MF	Masaaki Sawanobori	12 January 1970 (aged 24)	(Japan Football Association) Shimizu S-Pulse
17	MF	Takahiro Yamada	29 April 1972 (aged 22)	(Japan Football Association) Yokohama Marinos
18	FW	Takuya Takagi	12 November 1967 (aged 26)	(Japan Football Association) Sanfrecce Hiroshima
19	FW	Takafumi Ogura	6 July 1973 (aged 21)	(Japan Football Association) Nagoya Grampus Eight
20	GK	Kenichi Shimokawa	14 May 1970 (aged 24)	(Japan Football Association) JEF United Chiba

=== Myanmar ===
Coach: (Netherlands) Ger Blok

No.	Pos.	Player	Date of birth (age)	Club
1	GK	Aung Kyaw Kyaw		
2	DF	Soe Naing	10 May 1973 (aged 21)	
3	DF	Sann Win		
4	MF	Kyaw Min		
5	DF	Saw Ba Myint		
6	MF	Tin Myint Aung	25 March 1967 (aged 27)	
7	MF	Kyi Lwin		
8	MF	Than Toe Aung	19 January 1968 (aged 26)	
9	FW	Win Aung		
10	FW	Myo Hlaing Win	24 May 1973 (aged 21)	
11	MF	Soe Moe Kyaw		
12	DF	Nyunt Win		
13	DF	Ngwe Tun		
14	FW	Myo Myint Htwe		
15	MF	Aung Naing		
16	MF	Sai Maung Maung Oo		
17	MF	Tin Myo Aung		
18	GK	Zaw Win Naing		

=== Qatar ===
Coach: (Brazil) Evaristo de Macedo

No.	Pos.	Player	Date of birth (age)	Club
3	DF	Zamel Essa Al-Kuwari	23 August 1973 (aged 21)	
5	DF	Abdulla Jassem Al-Ishaq		
6	MF	Ahmed Lahdan		
7	FW	Adel Khamis	11 November 1965 (aged 28)	(Qatar Football Association) Al-Ittihad
8	MF	Yousuf Desmal		
9	FW	Waleed Ali Ibrahim	12 October 1973 (aged 20)	
10	MF	Ahmed Mubarak Al-Shafi	21 October 1974 (aged 19)	
11	MF	Abdulaziz Hassan	27 February 1973 (aged 21)	
12	FW	Mahmoud Soufi	20 October 1971 (aged 22)	
13	DF	Salem Al-Adsani		
14	DF	Juma Salem	20 August 1970 (aged 24)	
15	DF	Ali Al-Sulaiti		
17	DF	Sultan Al-Kuwari	14 August 1971 (aged 23)	
19	GK	Ahmed Khalil Al-Khaldi	17 October 1972 (aged 21)	
20	GK	Amer Al-Kaabi	20 May 1971 (aged 23)	(Qatar Football Association) Al-Ahli

=== United Arab Emirates ===
Coach: (Poland) Antoni Piechniczek

No.	Pos.	Player	Date of birth (age)	Club
1	GK	Adel Anas		
2	DF	Saleh Jumaa Ali		
3	MF	Ali Thani Jumaa	18 August 1968 (aged 26)	
4	DF	Abdulrahman Al-Haddad	23 March 1966 (aged 28)	
5	DF	Abdulras Mohammed		
6	DF	Ismail Rashid Ismail	27 October 1972 (aged 21)	(United Arab Emirates Football Association) Al-Wasl
7	FW	Bakheet Saad Mubarak	15 October 1970 (aged 23)	
8	MF	Khalid Ismail	7 July 1965 (aged 29)	
9	FW	Nasir Khamees	2 August 1965 (aged 29)	
10	FW	Adnan Al-Talyani	30 October 1964 (aged 29)	(United Arab Emirates Football Association) Al-Shaab
11	FW	Zuhair Bakheet	13 July 1967 (aged 27)	
12	MF	Hussain Ghuloum	24 September 1969 (aged 25)	
13	DF	Abdulkhaled Fadhel	8 November 1970 (aged 23)	
14	FW	Khamees Saad Mubarak	4 October 1970 (aged 23)	
15	MF	Mohamed Ali Kasla	12 December 1965 (aged 28)	(United Arab Emirates Football Association) Al-Nasr
16	MF	Abdulrazzaq Ibrahim	20 January 1967 (aged 27)	
17	GK	Muhsin Musabah	1 October 1964 (aged 30)	(United Arab Emirates Football Association) Al-Sharjah
18	MF	Ahmed Ibrahim Ali	15 November 1970 (aged 23)	
19	MF	Munther Ali Abdullah	12 January 1975 (aged 19)	
20	DF	Mohamed Obaid Al-Zahiri	1 August 1967 (aged 27)	
