= Park Kwang-hyun =

- Hangul: 박광현
- RR: Bak Gwanghyeon
- MR: Pak Kwanghyŏn

Park Kwang-hyun is a Korean name consisting of the family name Park and the given name Kwang-hyun (Gwang-hyun). It may refer to:

- Park Kwang-hyun (footballer) (born 1967)
- Park Kwang-hyun (film director) (born 1969)
- Park Gwang-hyun (born 1977)
