= Nipon =

Nipon may refer to:

== People ==
- Albert Nipon
- Nipon Goswami
- Nipon Malanont
- Nipon Pensuvapap
- Nipon Charn-arwut

== See also ==
- Nippon or Nihon, Japanese for Japan
- Nippon Club (Manhattan)
- Nihon Ōdai Ichiran, table of the rulers of Japan
- Nippon (disambiguation)
