= Marzouk =

Marzouk, Marzouq, Marzuq, or Marzuk is a masculine given name and surname of Arabic origin. Notable people with the name include:

== Given name ==
=== Marzouk ===
- Marzouk Al-Otaibi (born 1975), Saudi footballer
- Marzouk Al-Yoha (born 1968), Kuwaiti athlete

=== Marzouq ===
- Marzouq Al-Hubaini Al-Azmi (born 1952), Kuwaiti politician
- Marzouq Al-Ghanim (born 1968), Kuwaiti politician
- Marzouq Al-Muwallad (born 1992), Saudi basketball player

=== Marzuk ===
- Marzuke Mohsin, Bruneian politician and architect
- Marzuk Russell (born 1973), Bangladeshi actor, writer, and lyricist

=== Marzuq ===
- Marzuq Maarman (born 1992), South African rugby union player

== Surname ==
- Abdul Aziz Al-Marzouk (born 1975), Saudi footballer
- Ahmed Fayaz Bin Marzouk (born 1979), Saudi long jumper
- Essam Marzouk (born 1960), Egyptian-Canadian CIA detainee and refugee
- Faisal Marzouk, Kuwaiti swimmer
- Faraj Saad Marzouk (born 1961), Qatari sprinter
- Ghazi Saleh Marzouk (born 1951), Saudi athlete
- Mohsen Marzouk (born 1965), Tunisian politician
- Mongi Marzouk (born 1961), Tunisian politician
- Moshe Marzouk (1926–1955), Egyptian Karaite Jew who was hanged in 1955 for bombings in Cairo
- Rafika Marzouk (born 1979), Tunisian handball player
- Rashid Sheban Marzouk (born 1967), Qatari sprinter
- Tarik Marzouk (born 1982), Moroccan footballer
- Younes Bnou Marzouk (born 1996), French-Moroccan footballer

== See also ==
- Marzouki
- Marzuki
- Merzouga
- Murzik
- Murzuk
