= Irianto =

Irianto is a surname. Notable people with the surname include:

- Eri Irianto (1974–2000), Indonesian footballer
- Rachmat Irianto (born 1999), Indonesian footballer
