= 1993–94 Asian Club Championship =

13th edition of premier club football tournament organized by the AFC

1993–1994 Asian Club Championship
Tournament details
- Dates: ?? 1993 – February 1994
- Teams: 21
- Venue: Bangkok (final round)

Final positions
- Champions: (Thailand) Thai Farmers Bank (1st title)
- Runners-up: Oman Club
- Third place: (Japan) Tokyo Verdy
- Fourth place: (China) Liaoning FC

Tournament statistics
- Matches played: 31
- Goals scored: 99 (3.19 per match)

The 1993–94 Asian Club Championship was the 13th edition of the annual international club football competition held in the AFC region (Asia). It determined that year's club champion of association football in Asia.

Thai Farmers Bank from Thailand won the final and became Asian champions for the first time.

== Preliminary round ==
=== West Asia ===
Team 1	Agg.	Team 2	1st leg	2nd leg
PAS Tehran (Iran)	4–1	(Yemen) Al-Ahli	2–0	2–1
Al-Ansar (Lebanon)	3–1	(Qatar) Al-Ittihad	0–0	3–1

=== East Asia ===
Team 1	Agg.	Team 2	1st leg	2nd leg
Leng Ngan (Macau)	3–1	(Philippines) Philippine Army	3–0	0–1

=== South-East Asia ===
Team 1	Agg.	Team 2	1st leg	2nd leg
Arema Malang (Indonesia)	3–1	(Vietnam) Quang Nam-Da Nang	1–0	2–1
Thai Farmers Bank (Thailand)	w/o^{1}	(Malaysia) Pahang FA		

^{1} Pahang FA withdrew.

== First round ==
=== West Asia ===
Team 1	Agg.	Team 2	1st leg	2nd leg
PAS Tehran (Iran)	0–0 (4–5p)	(Lebanon) Al-Ansar	0–0	0–0
Al-Shabab (Saudi Arabia)	12–3	(Kuwait) Al-Arabi	5–2	7–1
Muharraq Club (Bahrain)	3–2	(United Arab Emirates) Sharjah FC	2–1	1–1

=== Central Asia ===
Team 1	Agg.	Team 2	1st leg	2nd leg
Oman Club	5–0	(Pakistan) Defence Club	5–0	n/p^{1}
Victory SC (Maldives)	w/o^{2}	(Bangladesh) Abahani KC		

^{1} The match was played over one leg due to civil unrest in Pakistan.
^{2} Abahani KC withdrew.

=== East Asia ===
Team 1	Agg.	Team 2	1st leg	2nd leg
Liaoning FC (China)	15–3	(Macau) Leng Ngan	9–0	6–3
Eastern AA (Hong Kong)	2–3	(Japan) Verdy Kawasaki	1–0	1–3

=== South-East Asia ===
Team 1	Agg.	Team 2	1st leg	2nd leg
Arema Malang (Indonesia)	3–6	(Thailand) Thai Farmers Bank	2–2	1–4

== Quarterfinals ==
(Saudi Arabia) Al-Shabab and (Maldives) Victory SC withdrew.

All matches were played at Supachalasai National Stadium in Bangkok, Thailand.

=== Group 1 ===
Team	Pld	W	D	L	GF	GA	GD	Pts	Qualification
(Japan) Verdy Kawasaki	2	2	0	0	3	0	+3	4	Advance to Semi-finals
Oman Club	2	1	0	1	1	1	0	2	Advance to Semi-finals
(Lebanon) Al-Ansar	2	0	0	2	0	3	−3	0	

Verdy Kawasaki (Japan)	1–0	Oman Club

Verdy Kawasaki (Japan)	2–0	(Lebanon) Al-Ansar

Oman Club	1–0	(Lebanon) Al-Ansar

=== Group 2 ===
Team	Pld	W	D	L	GF	GA	GD	Pts	Qualification
(China) Liaoning FC	2	1	1	0	2	1	+1	3	Advance to Semi-finals
(Thailand) Thai Farmers Bank (H)	2	0	2	0	3	3	0	2	Advance to Semi-finals
(Bahrain) Muharraq Club	2	0	1	1	2	3	−1	1	

(H) Hosts

Liaoning FC (China)	1–1	(Thailand) Thai Farmers Bank

Liaoning FC (China)	1–0	(Bahrain) Muharraq Club

Thai Farmers Bank (Thailand)	2–2	(Bahrain) Muharraq Club

== Knockout Stage ==
=== Bracket ===
Semi-finals
5 February – Bangkok
(Japan) Verdy Kawasaki	1 (1)
(Thailand) Thai Farmers Bank (p)	1 (3)
5 February – Bangkok
(China) Liaoning FC	1
Oman Club	4

Final
7 February – Bangkok
(Thailand) Thai Farmers Bank	2
Oman Club	1
Third place play-off
7 February – Bangkok
(Japan) Verdy Kawasaki	4
(China) Liaoning FC	1

=== Semi-finals ===
5 February 1994

Verdy Kawasaki (Japan)	1–1 (a.e.t.)	(Thailand) Thai Farmers Bank
Penalties
	1–3

Supachalasai National Stadium, Bangkok

5 February 1994

Liaoning FC (Oman)	1–4	(China) Oman Club

Supachalasai National Stadium, Bangkok

=== Third placed play-off ===
7 February 1994

Verdy Kawasaki (Japan)	4–1	(China) Liaoning FC

Supachalasai National Stadium, Bangkok

=== Final ===
7 February 1994

Thai Farmers Bank FC (Thailand)	2–1	Oman Club
Phamobal; Totavee		Salim

Supachalasai National Stadium, Bangkok
Referee: Ali Bujsaim ( United Arab Emirates)

== Awards ==
Award	Player	Team
Sanyo Most Valuable Player	(Thailand) Surachai Jaturapattarapong	(Thailand) Thai Farmers Bank FC
