= Shamsurin Abdul Rahman (Malaysian footballer) =

Malaysian footballer

Personal information
- Full name: Shamsurin bin Abdul Rahman
- Date of birth: 7 July 1967 (age 59)
- Place of birth: Malacca, Malaysia
- Position: Forward

Youth career
- Malacca FA

Senior career*
Years	Team	Apps	(Gls)
1988–1992	Malacca FA		
1993–1999	Sarawak FA		

International career
1994–1997	Malaysia		
- * Club domestic league appearances and goals

Shamsurin Abdul Rahman (born 7 July 1967) is a former Malaysian footballer.

== Career ==
Shamsurin started his career at Malacca FA, but is more known is his 7-year stint as a Sarawak FA player, whom coach Alan Vest brought together with Mazelan Wahid and Ong Kim Swee from Malacca FA in 1993. As a striker, he was partnered with players such as John Hunter, Affendi Julaihi and Alistair Edwards during his stay at Sarawak.

Shamsurin also played for Malaysia national football team, and was in the squad for the inaugural 1996 Tiger Cup tournament, where Malaysia finished as runner-up in the final against Thailand national football team. Shamsurin scored 4 goals in the tournament.

After retiring as professional player, Shamsurin moved into coaching. He coached Sarawak FA's Malaysia President Cup (under-21) squad from 2011.

== International goals ==
No.	Date	Venue	Opponent	Score	Result	Competition
1.	4 September 1996	Kallang, Singapore	Philippines	3–0	7–0	1996 AFF Championship
2.	4 September 1996	Kallang, Singapore	Philippines	6–0	7–0	1996 AFF Championship
3.	10 September 1996	Kallang, Singapore	Brunei	2–0	6–0	1996 AFF Championship
4.	13 September 1996	Kallang, Singapore	Indonesia	1–0	3–1	1996 AFF Championship
