= 1996 AFF Championship =

1996 東盟足球錦標賽 1996 Kejohanan Bola Sepak ASEAN 1996 ஏசியான் கால்ப கோப்பை

Tournament details
- Host country: Singapore
- Dates: 1–15 September
- Teams: 10
- Venue(s): National Stadium; Jurong Stadium

Final positions
- Champions: Thailand (1st title)
- Runners-up: Malaysia
- Third place: Vietnam
- Fourth place: Indonesia

Tournament statistics
- Matches played: 24
- Goals scored: 93 (3.88 per match)
- Attendance: 245,500 (10,229 per match)
- Top scorer(s): (Thailand) Natipong Sritong-In (7 goals)
- Best player: (Malaysia) Zainal Abidin Hassan
- Fair play award: Brunei

The 1996 AFF Championship, sponsored by Asia Pacific Breweries and officially known as the 1996 Tiger Cup, was the inaugural edition of the AFF Championship. It was hosted by Singapore from 1 to 15 September 1996 with all 10 nations of Southeast Asia taking part, four of which were invitees.

== Teams ==
All six founding members of the ASEAN Football Federation were participants, with the remaining Southeast Asian nations joining as invitees as they were not yet members of the AFF at this time.

Founding members

- Brunei
- Indonesia
- Malaysia
- Philippines
- Singapore
- Thailand

Invitees

- Cambodia
- Laos
- Myanmar
- Vietnam

== Venues ==
Singapore
Kallang	Jurong
National Stadium	Jurong Stadium
Capacity: 55,000	Capacity: 6,000
1996 AFF Championship is located in Singapore

== Group stage ==
Key to colours in group tables
Top two placed teams advanced to the semi-finals

=== Group A ===
Pos	Team	Pld	W	D	L	GF	GA	GD	Pts	Qualification
1	Indonesia	4	3	1	0	15	3	+12	10	Advanced to knockout stage
2	Vietnam	4	2	2	0	9	4	+5	8	Advanced to knockout stage
3	Myanmar	4	2	0	2	11	12	−1	6	
4	Laos	4	1	1	2	5	10	−5	4	
5	Cambodia	4	0	0	4	1	12	−11	0	

Source: AFF website
2 September 1996

Vietnam	3–1	Cambodia
Trần Công Minh 21'; Lê Huỳnh Đức 30'; Võ Hoàng Bửu 80' (pen.)		Sony 67'

Jurong Stadium, Jurong
Attendance: 2,800
2 September 1996

Indonesia	5–1	Laos
Fachri 5'; Eri 15'; Kurniawan 17'; Robby 34'; Peri 65'		Saysana 75'

Jurong Stadium, Jurong
Attendance: 2,800

5 September 1996

Laos	1–1	Vietnam
Chalana 72'		Lê Huỳnh Đức 85'

Jurong Stadium, Jurong
Attendance: 1,400
5 September 1996

Myanmar	5–0	Cambodia
Tin Myo Aung 14'; Win Aung 35', 54'; Myo Hlaing Win 71'; Maung Maung Oo 90'

Jurong Stadium, Jurong
Attendance: 1,500

7 September 1996

Vietnam	4–1	Myanmar
Nguyễn Hữu Đang 6'; Lê Huỳnh Đức 15'; Trần Công Minh 48'; Nguyễn Hồng Sơn 63'		Maung Maung Htay 24'

Jurong Stadium, Jurong
Attendance: 2,000
7 September 1996

Indonesia	3–0	Cambodia
Kurniawan 15'; Peri 23'; Eri 60'

Jurong Stadium, Jurong
Attendance: 2,000

9 September 1996

Cambodia	0–1	Laos
		Keolakhone 39'

Jurong Stadium, Jurong
Attendance: 4,000
9 September 1996

Indonesia	6–1	Myanmar
Fachri 7', 66'; Peri 20', 26'; Ansyari 28'; Eri 39'		Maung Maung Htay 26'

Jurong Stadium, Jurong
Attendance: 4,000

11 September 1996

Indonesia	1–1	Vietnam
Kurniawan 43'		Võ Hoàng Bửu 77' (pen.)

Jurong Stadium, Jurong
Attendance: 1,300
11 September 1996

Laos	2–4	Myanmar
Bounlap 40'; Phonesavanh 45'		Win Aung 16', 69'; Maung Maung Oo 35'; Myo Hlaing Win 82'

Jurong Stadium, Jurong
Attendance: 500

=== Group B ===
Team	Pld	W	D	L	GF	GA	GD	Pts
Thailand	4	3	1	0	13	1	+12	10
Malaysia	4	2	2	0	15	2	+13	8
Singapore (H)	4	2	1	1	7	2	+5	7
Brunei	4	1	0	3	1	15	−14	3
Philippines	4	0	0	4	0	16	−16	0

1 September 1996

Singapore	1–1	Malaysia
Fandi 89'		Sanbagamaran 76'

National Stadium, Kallang
Attendance: 43,800
2 September 1996

Philippines	0–5	Thailand
		Phithaya 10', 38'; Kiatisuk 14'; Natipong 40', 60' (Note: RSSSF credits the 60th-minute goal to Yutthana Polsak.)

Jurong Stadium, Jurong
Attendance: 2,800

4 September 1996

Malaysia	7–0	Philippines
Sanbagamaran 36', 61', 89'; Azman 43'; Shamsurin 53', 81'; Chandran 78'

National Stadium, Kallang
Attendance: 1,000
4 September 1996

Singapore	3–0	Brunei
Hasnim 1'; Steven Tan 4' (pen.); Fandi 51'

National Stadium, Kallang
Attendance: 8,400

6 September 1996

Thailand	6–0	Brunei
Phithaya 15'; Natipong 23', 87'; Worrawoot 35', 67'; Kiatisuk 77'

National Stadium, Kallang
Attendance: 8,000
6 September 1996

Singapore	3–0	Philippines
Fandi 20', 42'; Lim Tong Hai 73'

National Stadium, Kallang
Attendance: 12,000

8 September 1996

Brunei	1–0	Philippines
Irwan 28'

National Stadium, Kallang
Attendance: 3,000
8 September 1996

Thailand	1–1	Malaysia
Kiatisuk 28'		Zainal 59'

National Stadium, Kallang
Attendance: 14,000

10 September 1996

Malaysia	6–0	Brunei
Sanbagamaran 3'; Shamsurin 37'; Anuar 47', 60'; Chandran 82', 89'

National Stadium, Kallang
Attendance: 20,000
10 September 1996

Singapore	0–1	Thailand
		Natipong 70'

National Stadium, Kallang
Attendance: 42,000

== Knockout stage ==
Semi-finals
13 September
Indonesia	1
Malaysia	3
13 September
Thailand	4
Vietnam	2

Final
15 September
Malaysia	0
Thailand	1
Third place
15 September
Indonesia	2
Vietnam	3

=== Semi-finals ===
13 September 1996

Indonesia	1–3	Malaysia
Azmil 44' (o.g.)		Sanbagamaran 5'; Rusdee 16' (Note: RSSSF reports this as a Yap Wai Loon goal in the 16th minute.); Shamsurin 76'

National Stadium, Kallang
Attendance: 20,000
13 September 1996

Thailand	4–2	Vietnam
Kiatisuk 3'; Natipong 9', 24'; Worrawoot 46'		Võ Hoàng Bửu 83' (pen.); Nguyễn Hồng Sơn 88'

National Stadium, Kallang
Attendance: 20,000

=== Third place play-off ===
15 September 1996

Indonesia	2–3	Vietnam
Kurniawan 66'; Aples 85'		Huỳnh Quốc Cường 8'; Yeyen 27' (o.g.); Võ Hoàng Bửu 73' (pen.)

National Stadium, Kallang
Attendance: 32,000

=== Final ===
15 September 1996

Thailand	1–0	Malaysia
Senamuang 9'

National Stadium, Kallang
Attendance: 32,000
Referee: Yoshimi Ogawa (Japan)

== Incidents ==
Two Singaporeans and one Malaysian were arrested for attempting to fix a group stage game between Singapore and the Philippines. The three reportedly tried to bribe Filipino defender Judy Saluria for his side to concede seven goals so that Singapore can advance to the next round.

== Awards ==
1996 AFF Championship

Thailand
First title

Most Valuable Player	Golden Boot	Fair Play Award
(Malaysia) Zainal Abidin Hassan	(Thailand) Natipong Sritong-In	Brunei

== Goalscorers ==
7 goals

- (Thailand) Natipong Sritong-In

6 goals

- (Malaysia) K. Sanbagamaran

5 goals

- (Thailand) Kiatisuk Senamuang

4 goals

- (Indonesia) Kurniawan Dwi Yulianto
- (Indonesia) Peri Sandria
- (Malaysia) Shamsurin Abdul Rahman
- (Myanmar) Win Aung
- (Singapore) Fandi Ahmad
- (Vietnam) Võ Hoàng Bửu

3 goals

- (Indonesia) Fachri Husaini
- (Indonesia) Eri Irianto
- (Malaysia) M. Chandran
- (Thailand) Phithaya Santawong
- (Thailand) Worrawoot Srimaka
- (Vietnam) Lê Huỳnh Đức

2 goals

- (Malaysia) Anuar Abu Bakar
- (Myanmar) Maung Maung Htay
- (Myanmar) Maung Maung Oo
- (Myanmar) Myo Hlaing Win
- (Vietnam) Trần Công Minh
- (Vietnam) Nguyễn Hồng Sơn

1 goal

- (Brunei) Irwan Mohammad
- (Cambodia) Nuth Sony
- (Indonesia) Robby Darwis
- (Indonesia) Ansyari Lubis
- (Indonesia) Aples Tecuari
- (Laos) Saysana Savatdy
- (Laos) Chalana Luang-Amath
- (Laos) Keolakhone Channiphone
- (Laos) Bounlap Khenkitisack
- (Laos) Phonesavanh Phimmasean
- (Malaysia) Azman Adnan
- (Malaysia) Zainal Abidin Hassan
- (Malaysia) Rosdee Sulong
- (Myanmar) Tin Myo Aung
- (Singapore) Hasnim Haron
- (Singapore) Lim Tong Hai
- (Singapore) Steven Tan
- (Vietnam) Nguyễn Hữu Đang
- (Vietnam) Huỳnh Quốc Cường

1 own goal

- (Indonesia) Yeyen Tumena (playing against Vietnam)
- (Malaysia) Azmil Azali (playing against Indonesia)

== Team statistics ==
This table shows the ranking of teams throughout the tournament.

Pos	Team	Pld	W	D	L	GF	GA	GD
1	Thailand	6	5	1	0	18	3	+15
2	Malaysia	6	3	2	1	18	4	+14
3	Vietnam	6	3	2	1	14	10	+4
4	Indonesia	6	3	1	2	18	9	+9
Eliminated in the group stage
5	Singapore	4	2	1	1	7	2	+5
6	Myanmar	4	2	0	2	11	12	–1
7	Laos	4	1	1	2	5	10	–5
8	Brunei	4	1	0	3	1	15	–14
9	Cambodia	4	0	0	4	1	12	–11
10	Philippines	4	0	0	4	0	16	–16

== Media coverage ==
- Philippines - Vintage Television and IBC-13
- Singapore - Singapore Television Twelve (STV12): Prime 12 and Premiere 12 (Host broadcaster & Media partner)
- Malaysia - Radio Televisyen Malaysia
- Rest of ASEAN - No information available
