= John Hunter (Australian footballer) =

Scottish-born Australian footballer and coach

Personal information
- Place of birth: Scotland
- Position: Striker

Senior career*
Years	Team	Apps	(Gls)
1986–1987	Stirling Macedonia		(19)
1988–1990	Floreat Athena FC		
–1991	South China AA		(10)
1991–1995	Sarawak FA		
1996	Inglewood United FC		

Managerial career
- Inglewood United FC
- * Club domestic league appearances and goals

John Hunter is a Scottish-born Australian former footballer and coach.

== Career ==
=== Hall of Fame ===
Enshrined into the Football Hall of Fame Western Australia Hall of Merit for Players category in 2016, Hunter helped Inglewood United claim the 1996 State Premier League title and coached them for two seasons.

=== Sarawak ===
Roped in to Sarawak from South China in early 1991, he was nicknamed "Kerbau", which means "Buffalo", in Malay due to his build and was one of the club's first foreign footballers. Steering them to their first domestic trophy, the 1992 Malaysia FA Cup, the Australian was regarded by fans as the best foreign player to have ever represented Sarawak in its history, forming a strike partnership with Shamsurin Abdul Rahman.

The striker possessed a powerful header and left foot as well as his physical ability.

Returning to Sarawak for the 2017 Sarawak Glory Carnival along with Alan Vest, David Evans, and Alistair Edwards, he contributed to the 10–3 defeat of Selangor FA veterans in favour of Sarawak with one goal and expressed gratefulness for the opportunity.

== Honours ==
- Australian First Division (3): 1988, 1989, 1990
- D'Orsogna Cup (2)
