= Kwang-hyun =

- Hangul: 광현
- RR: Gwanghyeon
- MR: Kwanghyŏn

Kwang-hyun, also spelled Gwang-hyun, is a Korean given name.

People with this name include:

- Dae Gwang-hyeon (fl. 10th century), Balhae prince
- Baek Gwang-hyeon (1625–1697), Joseon Dynasty veterinarian portrayed in the 2012 South Korean television series The King's Doctor
- Park Kwang-hyun (footballer) (born 1967), South Korean football defender
- Park Kwang-hyun (film director) (born 1969), South Korean film director
- Park Gwang-hyun (born 1977), South Korean actor
- Lee Kwang-hyun (born 1981), South Korean football defender
- Na Kwang-hyun (born 1982), South Korean football midfielder
- Choi Gwang-hyeon (born 1986), South Korean judoka
- Nam Gwang-hyun (born 1987), South Korean football midfielder
- Kim Kwang-hyun (born 1988), South Korean baseball pitcher

== See also ==
- List of Korean given names
