= Marzuki =

Marzuki is an Indonesian name. in chinese is Ma

Notable people with this name include:

== Surname ==
- Ismail Marzuki (1914–1958), Indonesian musician
- Mohammad Laica Marzuki (born 1951), Indonesian judge

== Given name ==
- Marzuki Alie (born 1955), Indonesian politician
- Marzuki Badriawan (born 1967), Indonesian footballer
- Marzuki Darusman (born 1945), Indonesian politician
- Marzuki Usman (born 1943), Indonesian economist
