= Fakhri Husaini =

Indonesian football manager

Personal information
- Full name: Fakhri Aqil Husaini
- Date of birth: 27 July 1965 (age 61)
- Place of birth: Lhokseumawe, Indonesia
- Position: Attacking midfielder

Senior career*
Years	Team	Apps	(Gls)
1984–1989	Bina Taruna		
1989–1990	Lampung Putra		
1990–1991	Petrokimia Putra		
1991–2001	PKT Bontang		

International career
1988–1997	Indonesia	42	(14)

Managerial career
- 2008–2013: Bontang FC
- 2014: Indonesia U14
- 2014–2018: Indonesia U16
- 2019: Indonesia U19
- 2021: Persiba Balikpapan
- 2022: Borneo
- 2022: Persela Lamongan
- * Club domestic league appearances and goals

Fakhri Aqil Husaini (born 27 July 1965) is an Indonesian football coach and former player. He started playing as a midfielder and captained the Indonesia national team.

== Career statistics ==
=== International ===
Appearances and goals by national team and year
National team	Year	Apps	Goals
Indonesia	1988	3	0
Indonesia	1990	2	1
Indonesia	1991	4	0
Indonesia	1992	5	2
Indonesia	1993	7	0
Indonesia	1995	4	3
Indonesia	1996	9	3
Indonesia	1997	8	5
Total		42	14

Scores and results list Indonesia's goal tally first, score column indicates score after each Fakhri goal.

List of international goals scored by Fakhri Husaini
No.	Date	Venue	Opponent	Score	Result	Competition
1	18 August 1990	Gelora Senayan Stadium, Jakarta, Indonesia	Singapore	6–0	6–0	Friendly
2	22 April 1992	National Stadium, Kallang, Singapore	Singapore	1–0	2–1	1992 AFC Asian Cup qualification
3	25 April 1992	National Stadium, Kallang, Singapore	Malaysia	1–1	1–1	1992 AFC Asian Cup qualification
4	4 December 1995	700th Anniversary Stadium, Chiang Mai, Thailand	Thailand	1–1	1–2	1995 SEA Games
5	8 December 1995	700th Anniversary Stadium, Chiang Mai, Thailand	Malaysia	2–0	3–0	1995 SEA Games
6	8 December 1995	700th Anniversary Stadium, Chiang Mai, Thailand	Malaysia	3–0	3–0	1995 SEA Games
7	2 September 1996	Jurong Stadium, Jurong, Singapore	Laos	1–1	5–1	1996 AFF Championship
8	9 September 1996	Jurong Stadium, Jurong, Singapore	Myanmar	1–0	6–1	1996 AFF Championship
9	9 September 1996	Jurong Stadium, Jurong, Singapore	Myanmar	6–1	6–1	1996 AFF Championship
10	14 September 1997	Siliwangi Stadium, Bandung, Indonesia	Tanzania	1–0	3–1	Friendly
11	21 September 1997	Gelora 10 November Stadium, Surabaya, Indonesia	New Zealand	5–0	5–0	Friendly
12	9 October 1997	Gelora Senayan Stadium, Jakarta, Indonesia	Malaysia	1–0	4–0	1997 SEA Games
13	9 October 1997	Gelora Senayan Stadium, Jakarta, Indonesia	Malaysia	2–0	4–0	1997 SEA Games
14	16 October 1997	Gelora Senayan Stadium, Jakarta, Indonesia	Singapore	2–0	2–1	1997 SEA Games

== Honours ==
=== Player ===
PKT Bontang

- Liga Indonesia Premier Division runner up: 1999–2000

Indonesia

- SEA Games silver medal: 1997

=== Manager ===
Indonesia U16

- AFF U-16 Youth Championship: 2018
