= Somrit Ornsomjit =

Thai footballer

Personal information
- Full name: Somrit Ornsomjit
- Date of birth: February 11, 1970 (age 56)
- Place of birth: Bangkok, Thailand
- Height: 1.73 m (5 ft 8 in)
- Position: Striker

Senior career*
Years	Team	Apps	(Gls)
1987–1989	Royal Thai Air Force		
1990–1991	Pathum Thani		

International career
1995–1997	Thailand	??	(?)

Managerial career
- 2015–2017: Rajpracha
- * Club domestic league appearances and goals as of 18 July 2008

Somrit Ornsomjit (Thai สมฤทธิ์ อ่อนสมจิตร) is a Thai former professional footballer and played for Thailand national football team.

Somrit represented Thailand at the 1994 Asian Games.
