= Sunei Jaidee =

Thai footballer

Personal information
- Full name: Sunei Jaidee
- Date of birth: 22 May 1976 (age 50)
- Place of birth: Thailand
- Position: Midfielder

Senior career*
Years	Team	Apps	(Gls)
1996–1998	Royal Thai Air Force		

International career
1996–1998	Thailand	4	(0)
- * Club domestic league appearances and goals

Sunei Jaidee (born 22 May 1976) is a Thai former footballer who played as a midfielder. He played for Thailand at the 1996 Asian Cup.
