= Satit Ubolkhoa =

Thai footballer

Personal information
- Date of birth: 1976 (age 49–50)
- Place of birth: Songkhla, Thailand
- Position: Midfielder

Senior career*
Years	Team	Apps	(Gls)
1993–1999	Krung Thai Bank		
2000–2001	F.C. Pampilhosa		

International career
1996–2000	Thailand		
- * Club domestic league appearances and goals

Satit Ubolkhoa is a retired Thai football midfielder who was an unused substitute for Thailand in the 1996 Asian Cup. He also played for F.C. Pampilhosa.
