= Dmitry Bashkevich =

Uzbekistani footballer

Dmitriy Bashkevich
Personal information
- Full name: Dmitriy Valentinovich Bashkevich
- Date of birth: 26 February 1968 (age 58)
- Place of birth: Tashkent, Uzbek SSR, Soviet Union
- Position: Goalkeeper

Senior career*
Years	Team	Apps	(Gls)
1986–1987	Spartak Semipalatinsk	49	(0)
1988–1991	Khimik Dzhamboul	82	(0)
1991	Navbahor Namangan	10	(0)
1993	Kuban Krasnodar	18	(0)
1993–2003	Navbahor Namangan	-	( –)

International career
1996	Uzbekistan	1	(0)
- * Club domestic league appearances and goals

Dmitriy Valentinovich Bashkevich (Russian: Дмитрий Валентинович Башкевич; born 26 February 1968 in Tashkent) is a retired Uzbekistani football goalkeeper of Russian descent who played for Uzbekistani national team in the 1996 Asian Cup. He also played for Spartak Semipalatinsk, Khimik Dzhamboul, Navbahor Namangan and Kuban Krasnodar.
