= Eduard Momotov =

Uzbekistani-Russian football coach and manager

Personal information
- Date of birth: 22 January 1970 (age 56)
- Place of birth: Ust-Kamenogorsk, Kazakh SSR
- Height: 1.78 m (5 ft 10 in)
- Positions: Defender; midfielder

Team information
- Current team: FC Novokuznetsk (manager)

Senior career*
Years	Team	Apps	(Gls)
1989	FC Vostok	32	(2)
1990	FC Khimik Dzhambul	39	(2)
1991	FC Vostok	16	(0)
1991	FC Khimik Dzhambul	13	(1)
1992–1995	FK Neftchi Farg'ona	87	(13)
1996–1997	Navbahor Namangan	56	(10)
1998–1999	FC Chernomorets Novorossiysk	34	(0)
2001–2005	FC Metallurg-Kuzbass Novokuznetsk	113	(1)

International career
1996–1998	Uzbekistan	15	(0)

Managerial career
- 2008–2009: FC Metallurg-Kuzbass Novokuznetsk (assistant)
- 2010–2012: FC KUZBASS Kemerovo
- 2014–2016: FC Shakhtyor Prokopyevsk
- 2017–: FC Novokuznetsk
- * Club domestic league appearances and goals

Eduard Momotov (born 22 January 1970) is an Uzbek professional football coach and a former player. He also holds Russian citizenship. He is the manager of FC Novokuznetsk.

== Personal life ==
Momotov is the son of former hockey player Evgeni Momotov.
