= Nipon Malanont =

Thai footballer

Personal information
- Full name: Nipon Malanont
- Date of birth: 10 November 1966 (age 59)
- Place of birth: Bangkok, Thailand
- Height: 1.75 m (5 ft 9 in)
- Position: Goalkeeper

Senior career*
Years	Team	Apps	(Gls)
1991–2000	Thai Farmer Bank		

International career
1996–1997	Thailand	3	(0)
Medal record
Thailand national football team
ASEAN Football Championship
Gold medal – first place	Tiger Cup 1996	Football
- * Club domestic league appearances and goals

Nipon Malanont is a Thai retired football goalkeeper who played for Thailand in the 1996 Asian Cup.

== Honours ==
Thai Farmer Bank

- Afro-Asian Club Championship: 1994
- AFC Champions League: 1994, 1995
- Kor Royal Cup: 1991, 1992, 1993, 1995
- Thai Premier League: 2000
- Thailand FA Cup: 1999
- Queen's Cup: 1994, 1995, 1996, 1997

Thailand

- ASEAN Football Championship: 1996

== Goalkeeper Coach ==
- 2007–2010: Thailand
- 2007–2009: Chula-Sinthana FC
- 2009–2010: Muangthong United
- 2011 ; Thai Port
- 2011 ; Buriram
- 2012-2014: Bangkok United
- 2014–2015: Thailand U20
- 2014–2016: Suphanburi
- 2017: Ratchaburi Mitr Phol
- 2017–: Bangkok Glass
