= Ansar Razak =

Indonesian footballer

Personal information
- Full name: Ansar Razak
- Date of birth: 18 January 1974
- Place of birth: Makassar, Indonesia
- Date of death: 30 December 1998 (aged 24)
- Place of death: Makassar, Indonesia
- Position: Midfielder

Senior career*
Years	Team	Apps	(Gls)
1995–1996	PSM Makassar		

International career
1996	Indonesia	3	(0)
- * Club domestic league appearances and goals

Ansar Razak (18 January 1974 – 30 December 1998) was an Indonesian former footballer who plays as a midfielder.

He died in 1998 in a traffic accident.

== Honours ==
PSM Makassar

- Liga Indonesia Premier Division runner-up: 1995–96
