= Jalil Zaidan =

Iraqi football Goalkeeper

Personal information
- Date of birth: 2 November 1967 (age 58)
- Place of birth: Iraq
- Position: Goalkeeper

Team information
- Current team: Al-Kahrabaa FC (Goalkeep. coach)

Senior career*
Years	Team	Apps	(Gls)
- Al-Sinaa SC
- Al-Zawra'a SC
- Al-Quwa Al-Jawiya
- Al-Naft SC
- Al Shorta

International career
1996–1997	Iraq	4	(0)

Managerial career
- 2013–2015: Erbil (Goalkeep. coach)
- 2015–2019: Al-Naft (Goalkeep. coach)
- 2019: Naft Maysan (Goalkeep. coach)
- 2019–2021: Al-Zawraa (Goalkeep. coach)
- 2021: Naft Al-Wasat SC (Goalkeep. coach)
- 2021–: Al-Kahrabaa FC (Goalkeep. coach)
- * Club domestic league appearances and goals

Jalil Zaidan (born 2 November 1967) is an Iraqi football goalkeeper who played for the national team in the 1996 Asian Cup. He also played for Al-Quwa Al-Jawiya.
