= Supriyono Paimin =

Indonesian footballer

Supriyono
Personal information
- Full name: Supriyono Paimin
- Place of birth: Indonesia
- Position: Striker

International career
Years	Team	Apps	(Gls)
1996–1997	Indonesia	6	(0)

Supriyono Paimin is an Indonesian footballer who previously plays as striker for the Indonesia national team.
