= Eri Irianto =

Indonesian footballer

Personal information
- Date of birth: 12 January 1974
- Place of birth: Sidoarjo, Indonesia
- Date of death: 3 April 2000 (aged 26)
- Place of death: Surabaya, Indonesia
- Height: 1.73 m (5 ft 8 in)
- Position: Midfielder

Senior career*
Years	Team	Apps	(Gls)
1994–1995	Petrokimia Putra	37	(2)
1996	Kuala Lumpur FA	23	(2)
1997–2000	Persebaya Surabaya	50	(7)
Total		110	(11)

International career
1993–1997	Indonesia	18	(8)
- * Club domestic league appearances and goals

Eri Irianto (12 January 1974 – 3 April 2000) was an Indonesian footballer. He played for Persebaya Surabaya.

He died on 3 April 2000 after collapsing following a heart attack on the pitch during a league match against PSIM Yogyakarta at Gelora 10 November Stadium. He wore the number 19, which was retired after his death.

== International career ==
=== International goals ===
No.	Date	Venue	Opponent	Score	Result	Competition
1.	6 December 1995	700th Anniversary Stadium, Chiang Mai, Thailand	Cambodia	1–0	10–0	1995 Southeast Asian Games
2.	6 December 1995	700th Anniversary Stadium, Chiang Mai, Thailand	Cambodia	2–0	10–0	1995 Southeast Asian Games
3.	6 December 1995	700th Anniversary Stadium, Chiang Mai, Thailand	Cambodia	3–0	10–0	1995 Southeast Asian Games
4.	6 December 1995	700th Anniversary Stadium, Chiang Mai, Thailand	Cambodia	4–0	10–0	1995 Southeast Asian Games
5.	8 December 1995	700th Anniversary Stadium, Chiang Mai, Thailand	Malaysia	1–0	3–0	1995 Southeast Asian Games
6.	2 September 1996	Jurong Stadium, Jurong, Singapore	Laos	2–0	5–1	1996 AFF Championship
7.	7 September 1996	Jurong Stadium, Jurong, Singapore	Cambodia	3–0	3–0	1996 AFF Championship
8.	9 September 1996	Jurong Stadium, Jurong, Singapore	Myanmar	5–1	6–1	1996 AFF Championship

== Honours ==
Petrokimia Putra

- Liga Indonesia Premier Division runner-up: 1994–95

Persebaya Surabaya

- Liga Indonesia Premier Division runner-up: 1998–99

Indonesia

- AFF Championship third place: 1998

== See also ==
- List of association footballers who died while playing
