= Khaled Fairouz =

Kuwaiti footballer

Personal information
- Place of birth: Kuwait
- Position: Forward

Senior career*
Years	Team	Apps	(Gls)
- Yarmook

International career
1996	Kuwait	4	(0)
- * Club domestic league appearances and goals

Khaled Fairouz is a Kuwaiti football forward who played for the Kuwait national team in the 1996 Asian Cup. He also played for Yarmook.
