= Maher Berakdar =

Syrian footballer (born 1968)

Personal information
- Date of birth: 26 March 1968 (age 58)
- Place of birth: Homs, Syria
- Position: Goalkeeper

Senior career*
Years	Team	Apps	(Gls)
- Al-Karamah
- Nejmeh SC
- Al-Karamah

International career
1984–1997	Syria		
- * Club domestic league appearances and goals

Maher Berakdar (Arabic: ماهر بيرقدار) (born 26 March 1968) is a Syrian football goalkeeper
