= Aples Tecuari =

Indonesian footballer

Personal information
- Full name: Aples Gideon Tecuari
- Date of birth: 21 April 1973 (age 53)
- Place of birth: Jayapura, Indonesia
- Height: 1.75 m (5 ft 9 in)
- Position: Defender

Senior career*
Years	Team	Apps	(Gls)
1995–2002	Pelita Jaya	20+	(0)
2003	PSPS Pekanbaru		
2004	Persija Jakarta		
2005	Perseman Manokwari		
Total		20+	(0+)

International career
1993–2004	Indonesia	41	(2)
- * Club domestic league appearances and goals

Aples Gideon Tecuari (born 21 April 1973) is an Indonesian former footballer who previously played as a defender.

== Clubs career ==
=== Club statistics ===
Club	Season	Super League		Premier Division		Piala Indonesia		Total	
Club	Season	Apps	Goals	Apps	Goals	Apps	Goals	Apps	Goals
Pelita Jaya	2002	-		20	0	-		20	0
Total		-		20	0	-		20	0

== International career ==
In 1996 Aples's international career began.

=== International goals ===
#	Date	Venue	Opponent	Score	Result	Competition
1.	15 September 1996	National Stadium, Kallang, Singapore	Vietnam	2–3	2–3	1996 AFF Championship
2.	22 April 2001	Gelora Bung Karno Stadium, Jakarta, Indonesia	Cambodia	5–0	6–0	2002 FIFA World Cup qualification

== Honours ==
Indonesia

- AFF Championship runner-up: 2002
