= Ahmed Ali Hussein =

Iraqi footballer

Ahmed Ali
Personal information
- Full name: Ahmed Ali Hussein
- Date of birth: 1 January 1967
- Place of birth: Iraq
- Date of death: 4 February 2026 (aged 59)
- Place of death: Doha, Qatar
- Position: Goalkeeper

Senior career*
Years	Team	Apps	(Gls)
- Al-Amana
- Al-Rasheed
- Al-Karkh
- Al-Quwa Al-Jawiya
- Al-Zawraa
- Al-Najaf
- Al-Talaba
- Al-Shorta
- Erbil
- Al-Difaa Al-Jawi

International career
1986–1996	Iraq		
- * Club domestic league appearances and goals

Ahmed Ali Hussein (Arabic: أَحْمَد عَلِيّ حُسَيْن; 1 January 1967 – 4 February 2026) was a former Iraqi football goalkeeper who played for Iraq at the 1996 AFC Asian Cup. He played for Iraq between 1986 and 1996.

He was third choice keeper at the 1996 AFC Asian Cup. On 4 February 2026, he died in hospital in Doha, Qatar after suffering from the effects of a stroke.
