= K. Sanbagamaran =

Malaysian footballer (born 1972)

Personal information
- Full name: Sanbagamaran a/l Kalasigaram
- Date of birth: 19 February 1972 (age 54)
- Place of birth: Kajang, Malaysia
- Positions: Midfielder; defender

Youth career
- Selangor

Senior career*
Years	Team	Apps	(Gls)
1993–2000	Selangor		
2001–2004	Sabah		
2005–2006	Selangor		
2006–2008	PKNS		

International career^{‡}
- Malaysia U-23
1994–2004	Malaysia	22	(9)

Managerial career
- 2014: MISC-MIFA (interim)
- 2015–2016: DYS F.C.
- * Club domestic league appearances and goals as of October 10, 2018 ‡ National team caps and goals as of October 10, 2018

K. Sanbagamaran a/l Kalasigaram (born 19 February 1972) is a Malaysian footballer.

== Career ==
He played for Selangor FA, Sabah FA and PKNS FC during his career. He also played for the national team, and played a major role in Malaysia reaching the final of 1996 Tiger Cup, where he scored 6 goals during the tournament, one less than top scorer of the tournament Netipong Srithong-in.

On 21 February 1997, He scored 2 goal which ended in a 2–1 Won against Finland in the 1997 Dunhill Cup Malaysia.

On 17 September 2014, FourFourTwo list him on their list of the top 25 Malaysian footballers of all time.

== International goals ==
No.	Date	Venue	Opponent	Score	Result	Competition
1.	22 September 1994	Kuala Lumpur, Malaysia	Kuwait	1–1	1–2	Friendly Match
2.	1 September 1996	Kallang, Singapore	Singapore	1–0	1–1	1996 AFF Championship
3.	4 September 1996	Kallang, Singapore	Philippines	1–0	7–0	1996 AFF Championship
4.	4 September 1996	Kallang, Singapore	Philippines	4–0	7–0	1996 AFF Championship
5.	4 September 1996	Kallang, Singapore	Philippines	7–0	7–0	1996 AFF Championship
6.	10 September 1996	Kallang, Singapore	Brunei	1–0	6–0	1996 AFF Championship
7.	13 September 1996	Kallang, Singapore	Indonesia	3–1	3–1	1996 AFF Championship
8.	21 February 1997	Kuala Lumpur, Malaysia	Finland	1–0	2–1	1997 Dunhill Cup
9.	21 February 1997	Kuala Lumpur, Malaysia	Finland	2–1	2–1	1997 Dunhill Cup

== Honours ==
=== Player ===
Selangor

- Malaysia Premier 1: 2000
- Malaysia FA Cup: 1997, 2005
- Malaysia Cup: 1997
- Malaysia Charity Shield: 1997

Malaysia

- Tiger Cup : 1996 runner-up
