= Marzouki =

Marzouki (Arabic: مرزوقي) is an Arabic surname. Notable people with the surname include:

- Ahmed Marzouki (born 1947), Moroccan military officer
- Anouar Marzouki, Tunisian politician
- Mehdi Marzouki (born 1988), Tunisian footballer
- Hamdi Marzouki (born 1977), Tunisian footballer
- Moncef Marzouki (born 1945), fourth President of Tunisia
- Mohamed Habib Marzouki (born 1947), Tunisian academic, philosopher and politician
