= Mohamed Al-Kaledi =

Kuwaiti footballer

Mohamed Binyyan Al-Kaledi
Personal information
- Date of birth: 13 February 1971 (age 55)
- Position: Midfielder

Senior career*
Years	Team	Apps	(Gls)
1987–2004	Al Qadesiya		

International career
1990–2002	Kuwait		
- * Club domestic league appearances and goals

Mohamed Binyyan Al-Kaledi (born 13 February 1971) is a Kuwaiti footballer. He competed in the men's tournament at the 1992 Summer Olympics.
