= Hassan Matrud =

Iraqi footballer

Personal information
- Full name: Hassan Jawad Matrud
- Date of birth: 1 January 1976 (age 50)
- Place of birth: Iraq
- Position: Defender

International career
Years	Team	Apps	(Gls)
1996–1999	Iraq		

Hassan Matrud (born 1 January 1976) is a former Iraqi football defender who played for Iraq at the 1996 AFC Asian Cup. He played for Iraq between 1996 and 1999.

He was also called up for the 1999 Pan Arab Games and 2000 AFC Asian Cup qualification.
