= Maung Maung Oo =

Burmese politician

- ဦးမောင်မောင်ဦး

Member of the Pyithu Hluttaw
- In office 3 February 2016 – 1 February 2021
- Constituency: Insein Township

Personal details
- Born: 20 March 1964 (age 62) Pyuntaza, Myanmar
- Party: National League for Democracy
- Spouse: Kyawt San
- Parent(s): Khin Maung Gyi (father); Mya Than (mother)
- Education: Rangoon University
- Occupation: Politician

Maung Maung Oo (Burmese: မောင်မောင်ဦး; born on 20 March 1964) is a Burmese politician who currently serves as Pyithu Hluttaw member of parliament for Insein Township constituency. He is a member of the National League for Democracy.

== Early life and education ==
Maung Maung Oo was born on 20 March 1964 in Pyuntaza, Bago Region, Myanmar. He graduated with B.Sc (Zoology) (Q) from Rangoon University. He worked with pig livestock in Yangon.

== Political career ==
He is a member of the National League for Democracy Party. In the 2015 Myanmar general election, he was elected as a Pyithu Hluttaw representative from Insein Township parliamentary constituency.
