= Sujja Siriket =

Thai footballer

Personal information
- Full name: Sujja Siriket
- Place of birth: Thailand
- Position: Sweeper

Senior career*
| Years | Team | Apps | (Gls) |
| 1988–1998 | Thai Farmers Bank FC | | |

International career
| 1989–1996 | Thailand | 10 | (1) |

Managerial career
- 2011–2018: Chamchuri United
- * Club domestic league appearances and goals

Sujja Siriket (Thai: สัจจา ศิริเขตร์) is a Thai former football sweeper who played for Thailand in the 1996 Asian Cup. He is a former captain of the Thai Farmers Bank FC.

== Honours ==
Thai Farmer Bank FC

- AFC Champions League: 1994, 1995
- Thai League T1 (Kor Royal Cup): 1991, 1992, 1993, 1995, 2000
- Queen's Cup: 1994, 1995, 1996, 1997
- Afro-Asian Club Championship: 1994
- Thailand FA Cup: 1999

== International goals ==
| # | Date | Venue | Opponent | Score | Result | Competition |
|---|---|---|---|---|---|---|
| 1. | March 14, 1995 | New Delhi, India | Iraq | 1–3 | Lost | 1995 Nehru Cup |
