= Nipon Charn-arwut =

Thai footballer (born 1976)

Personal information
- Full name: Nipon Charn-arwut
- Date of birth: April 11, 1976 (age 50)
- Place of birth: Nakhon Sri Thammarat, Thailand
- Height: 1.77 m (5 ft 9 1/2 in)
- Position: Defender

Senior career*
Years	Team	Apps	(Gls)
?	Osotspa		
2009–?	Nakhon Pathom		
- * Club domestic league appearances and goals as of 14 November 2008

Nipon Charn-arwut (Thai: นิพนธ์ ชาญอาวุธ) is a Thai former professional footballer who played for Osotspa F.C. and Nakhon Pathom in the Thailand Premier League.
