= Yousef Al-Dokhi =

Kuwaiti footballer

Personal information
- Date of birth: 2 August 1973 (age 53)
- Place of birth: Kuwait
- Position: Defender

Senior career*
Years	Team	Apps	(Gls)
1989–2001	Kazma SC	-	

International career
1992–2000	Kuwait	28	(0)
- * Club domestic league appearances and goals

Yousef Al-Dokhi is a Kuwaiti football defender who played for Kuwait in the 1996 Asian Cup. He also played for Kazma and competed in the men's tournament at the 1992 Summer Olympics.

== Career statistics ==
=== International ===
Appearances and goals by national team and year
National team	Year	Apps	Goals
Kuwait	1992	6	0
Kuwait	1993	–	
Kuwait	1994	6	0
Kuwait	1995	–	
Kuwait	1996	11	0
Kuwait	1997	3	0
Kuwait	1998	–	
Kuwait	1999	–	
Kuwait	2000	2	0
Total		28	0
