= Falah Al-Majidi =

Kuwaiti footballer

Falah Dabsha Al Majidi
Personal information
- Date of birth: 13 November 1970 (age 55)
- Place of birth: Kuwait
- Height: 1.90 m (6 ft 3 in)
- Position: Goalkeeper

Youth career
- Al-Jahra

Senior career*
Years	Team	Apps	(Gls)
1989–1997	Al-Jahra		
1997–2006	Al Arabi	?	(0)
2006–2008	Khaitan		(0)

International career
1992	Kuwait u-23		
1992–2000	Kuwait	21	(0)
2010	Kuwait Beach Soccer		
- * Club domestic league appearances and goals

Falah Dabsha Al Majidi is a Kuwaiti football goalkeeper who played for Kuwait in the 1996 Asian Cup. He also competed in the men's tournament at the 1992 Summer Olympics.
