= Wacharapong Somcit =

Thai footballer

Personal information
- Date of birth: 21 August 1975
- Place of birth: Lopburi, Thailand
- Date of death: 1998 (aged 23)
- Place of death: Bangkok, Thailand
- Height: 1.77 m (5 ft 9 1/2 in)
- Position: Goalkeeper

Senior career*
| Years | Team | Apps | (Gls) |
| 1995–1997 | Bangkok Bank F.C. | | |

International career
| 1993–1998 | Thailand | 41 | (0) |
Medal record
Thailand national football team
Southeast Asian Games
| Gold medal – first place | 1993 Singapore | Football |
| Gold medal – first place | 1995 Chiang Mai | Football |
| Gold medal – first place | 1997 Jakarta | Football |
- * Club domestic league appearances and goals

Wacharapong Somcit (21 August 1975 – 1998) is a Thai association football goalkeeper, who played for Thailand in the 1996 Asian Cup. At the end of the 1997 Southeast Asian Games in Indonesia, he died of colorectal cancer.
