= Ayman Al-Hussaini =

Kuwaiti footballer

Ayman Al Husaini
Personal information
- Date of birth: 22 November 1967 (age 58)
- Place of birth: Kuwait
- Position: Midfielder

Senior career*
| Years | Team | Apps | (Gls) |
| 1985–2000 | Kazma SC | | |

International career
| 1990–1999 | Kuwait | | |
- * Club domestic league appearances and goals

Ayman Al Husaini is a Kuwaiti football midfielder who played for Kuwait in the 1996 Asian Cup. He also played for Kazma SC.
