= Khaled Al-Fadhli =

Kuwaiti footballer

Khaled Al Fadhli
Personal information
- Full name: Khaled Al Fadhli
- Date of birth: May 15, 1974 (age 52)
- Place of birth: Kuwait City, Kuwait
- Height: 1.87 m (6 ft 1 1/2 in)
- Position: Goalkeeper

Youth career
- Kazma

Senior career*
Years	Team	Apps	(Gls)
1991–2004	Kazma		(0)
2004–2012	Al Kuwait		(1)
Total			(1)

International career^{‡}
1995–2008	Kuwait	73	(0)
- * Club domestic league appearances and goals as of December 8, 2011 ‡ National team caps and goals as of November 5, 2008

Khaled Al Fadhli (Arabic: خالد الفضلي, born 15 May 1974) is a Kuwaiti footballer who is a goalkeeper for the Kuwaiti Premier League club Al Kuwait.
