= Sing Totavee =

Thai footballer

Personal information
- Full name: Sing Totavee
- Date of birth: 27 August 1969 (age 57)
- Place of birth: Thailand
- Positions: Center back; right winger

Senior career*
Years	Team	Apps	(Gls)
1991–1999	Thai Farmers Bank FC	-	(-)

International career
1991–1997	Thailand	5	(0)
- * Club domestic league appearances and goals

Sing Totavee is a Thai retired football defender who played for Thailand in the 1996 Asian Cup. He also played for Thai Farmers Bank
