= Pattanapong Sripramote =

Thai footballer (born 1974)

Personal information
- Full name: Pattanapong Sripramote
- Date of birth: February 3, 1974 (age 52)
- Place of birth: Bangkok, Thailand
- Height: 1.80 m (5 ft 11 in)
- Position: Defender

Senior career*
Years	Team	Apps	(Gls)
- Rajpracha

International career
1993–1999	Thailand	75	(7)

Managerial career
- 2012: Rajpracha
- 2018: Khon Kaen
- 2019: Ayutthaya United (interim)
- 2020: Rajpracha
- 2023–2025: Rajpracha
- 2025–2026: Chanthaburi
Medal record
Thailand national football team
Sea Games
Gold medal – first place	Sea Games 1993	Football
Gold medal – first place	Sea Games 1995	Football
Gold medal – first place	Sea Games 1997	Football
Gold medal – first place	Sea Games 1999	Football
- * Club domestic league appearances and goals as of 18 July 2008

Pattanapong Sripramote (Thai พัฒนพงษ์ ศรีปราโมทย์) is a Thai retired football player. He is defender who scored 7 goals for the Thailand national team, including a hat-trick in 1996 Asian Cup Qualification against Maldives. He was most recently manager of Thai League 2 club Chanthaburi.

== International goals ==
#	Date	Venue	Opponent	Score	Result	Competition
1.	June 27, 1996	Bangkok, Thailand	Maldives	8-0	Won	1996 Asian Cup Qualification
2.	July 4, 1996	Singapore	Maldives	8-0	Won	1996 Asian Cup Qualification
3.	July 4, 1996	Singapore	Maldives	8-0	Won	1996 Asian Cup Qualification
4.	July 4, 1996	Singapore	Maldives	8-0	Won	1996 Asian Cup Qualification
5.	July 4, 1996	Singapore	Maldives	8-0	Won	1996 Asian Cup Qualification
6.	July 7, 1996	Singapore	Myanmar	7-1	Won	1996 Asian Cup Qualification
7.	July 7, 1996	Singapore	Myanmar	7-1	Won	1996 Asian Cup Qualification

== Managerial statistics ==
As of match played 10 February 2026

Managerial record by team and tenure
Team	From	To	Record				
Team	From	To	P	W	D	L	Win %
Khon Kaen	1 May 2018	30 November 2018	5	3	0	2	60.00
Rajpracha	9 January 2020	24 November 2020	1	0	0	1	0.00
Rajpracha	10 March 2023	9 November 2025	13	5	3	5	38.46
Chanthaburi	10 November 2025	10 February 2026	11	4	3	4	36.36
Total			30	12	6	12	40.00
