= Marzuki Badriawan =

Indonesian footballer

Personal information
- Full name: Marzuki Badriawan
- Date of birth: 20 October 1967 (age 59)
- Place of birth: Indonesia
- Position: Defender

Senior career*
Years	Team	Apps	(Gls)
1991–1996	Mitra Surabaya		
1996–1997	Persekabpas Pasuruan		

International career
1996–1997	Indonesia	6	(0)
- * Club domestic league appearances and goals

Marzuki Badriawan (born 20 October 1967), simply known as Marzuki, is a former Indonesian footballer who played as defender for Mitra Surabaya, Persekabpas Pasuruan and the Indonesia national team.
