= Park Kwang-hyun (footballer) =

South Korean footballer

Personal information
- Full name: Park Kwang-hyun
- Date of birth: 24 July 1967 (age 59)
- Place of birth: South Korea
- Height: 1.80 m (5 ft 11 in)
- Position: Defender

Senior career*
Years	Team	Apps	(Gls)
- Immanuel FC
- Hyundai Motor Company FC
1989–1991	Hyundai Horangi	31	(0)
1992–1999	Ilhwa Chunma / Cheonan Ilhwa	111	(4)

International career^{‡}
1996	South Korea	4	(0)
- * Club domestic league appearances and goals as of 1 January 2018 ‡ National team caps and goals as of 11 January 2018

- Park Kwang-hyun
- Hangul: 박광현
- Hanja: 朴光鉉
- RR: Bak Gwanghyeon
- MR: Pak Kwanghyŏn

Park Kwang-hyun (Korean: 박광현; born 24 July 1967) was a South Korean football player.

== Club career ==
He played Hyundai Horangi, Ilhwa Chunma / Cheonan Ilhwa.

== Internaltional career ==
He made his debut for the South Korea senior team in a 3–1 friendly match China on 25 September 1996.
