= Jordan national football team results (2000–2009) =

- Win Draw Loss

This article provides details of international football games played by the Jordan national football team from 2000 to 2009.

== Results by year ==
Year	GP	W	D	L	Win %
2000	21	5	11	5	23.81
2001	14	5	6	3	35.71
2002	18	10	4	4	55.56
2003	9	6	1	2	66.67
2004	28	11	6	11	39.29
2005	5	0	3	2	0.00
2006	17	6	4	7	35.29
2007	9	4	2	3	44.44
2008	20	5	4	11	25.00
2009	11	2	3	6	18.18
Total	152	54	44	54	35.53

== Matches ==
=== 2000 ===
23 February Friendly	Lebanon	1–1	Jordan	Lebanon
		Report

6 March Friendly	Syria	0–0	Jordan	Syria
		Report

8 March Friendly	Jordan	1–1	Lebanon	Amman, Jordan
		Report		Stadium: Amman International Stadium

11 March Friendly	Jordan	0–0	Bosnia and Herzegovina	Amman, Jordan
	Salim 28'	Report	Ihtjarević 20'; Joldić 60'	Attendance: 2,000; Referee: Abdullah Omar (Jordan)

13 March Friendly	Jordan	0–0	Syria	Amman, Jordan
		Report		Stadium: Amman International Stadium

15 March Friendly	Jordan	1–2	Bosnia and Herzegovina	Amman, Jordan
	Salim 28'	Report	Ihtjarević 20'; Joldić 60'	Attendance: 2,000; Referee: Salem Mahmoud (Jordan)

25 March Friendly	Jordan	1–1	Bahrain	Bahrain
		Report

31 March 2000 Asian Cup qualification	Jordan	0–1	Kazakhstan	Doha, Qatar
		Report	Avdeyev 10'	Stadium: Al-Sadd Stadium

4 April 2000 Asian Cup qualification	Palestine	1–5	Jordan	Doha, Qatar
	Fahad 49'	Report	Abu Zema 6', 22'; Abdullah 35'; Al-Khatib 37', 47'	Stadium: Al-Sadd Stadium; Attendance: 11,000

6 April 2000 Asian Cup qualification

Pakistan

0–5
Report
Jordan
- Al-Sheikh 6'

* Abu Raba  11'
* Ghanem Hamarsheh  13', 34'

* Al-Khatib 80'
Doha, Qatar
Stadium: Al-Sadd Stadium

8 April 2000 Asian Cup qualification	Qatar	2–2	Jordan	Doha, Qatar
	Al Kuwari 66'; Al Enazi 67'	Report	Abu Zema 25'; * Abdullah 45'	Stadium: Al-Sadd Stadium

13 May Friendly	Jordan	1–1	Lebanon	Amman, Jordan
		Report

23 May 2000 WAFF Championship Group B	Jordan	2–0	Kyrgyzstan	Amman, Jordan
17:30	Abu Zema 28' (pen.); Al-Shagran 68'	Report		Stadium: King Abdullah II Stadium

25 May 2000 WAFF Championship Group B	Jordan	0–0	Iraq	Amman, Jordan
20:30		Report		Stadium: King Abdullah II Stadium

27 May 2000 WAFF Championship Group B	Jordan	0–0	Lebanon	Amman, Jordan
20:30		Report		Stadium: King Abdullah II Stadium

31 May 2000 WAFF Championship semi-finals	Iran	1–0	Jordan	Amman, Jordan
20:30	Karimi 17'	Report		Stadium: King Abdullah II Stadium; Referee: Abdulhameed Ebrahim (Bahrain)

2 June 2000 WAFF Championship third place	Iraq	4–1	Jordan	Amman, Jordan
17:30	Farhan 16', 74'; Kadhim 30'; Hadi 37'	Report	Tadrus 48'	Stadium: King Abdullah II Stadium; Referee: Abdulhameed Ebrahim (Bahrain)

11 August Friendly	Jordan	2–0	Bahrain	Amman, Jordan
		Report

13 August Friendly	Syria	1–0	Jordan	Syria
		Report

2 October Friendly	Jordan	1–0	Saudi Arabia	Amman, Jordan
19:00 (UTC+3)	Shelbaieh 49'	Report		Stadium: King Abdullah II Stadium

7 October Friendly	Jordan	1–1	China	Amman, Jordan
	?	Report	Yang Chen 38'	Stadium: King Abdullah II Stadium

=== 2001 ===
5 January Friendly	Qatar	3–1	Jordan	Doha, Qatar
		Report		Stadium: Khalifa International Stadium

11 January Millennium Super Soccer Cup Group III	Romania XI	0–1	Jordan	Margao, India
		Report	Ibrahim 87'	Stadium: Fatorda Stadium; Referee: Bala Sundaraj (India)

16 January Millennium Super Soccer Cup Group III	Jordan	2–0	Hong Kong	Margao, India
	Al-Shaqran 49'; Al-Shboul 84'	Report		Stadium: Fatorda Stadium

21 January Millennium Super Soccer Cup quarter-finals	Jordan	0–4	Japan University XI	Kolkata, India
		Report	Fujita 31'; Ota 54'; Yoshimura 58'; Hideki Sekine 67'	Stadium: Salt Lake Stadium; Referee: Binod Kumar Singh (India)

28 January Friendly	Jordan	1–0	North Korea	Amman, Jordan
		Report		Stadium: Amman International Stadium

30 January Friendly	Jordan	0–2	North Korea	Amman, Jordan
		Report		Stadium: Amman International Stadium

28 February Friendly	Jordan	0–2	Bulgaria	Amman, Jordan
		Report	Chomakov 43'; Petrov 55'	Stadium: King Abdullah II Stadium; Attendance: 4,000; Referee: Abdul Omar (Jordan)

7 March Friendly	Jordan	1–1	Hungary	Amman, Jordan
18:30 UTC+2	Shelbaieh 40'	Report	Mátyus 76'	Stadium: King Abdullah II Stadium; Attendance: 3,000; Referee: Hassan Marshoud (Jordan)

23 April 2002 World Cup qualification first round	Turkmenistan	2–0	Jordan	Tashkent, Uzbekistan
16:00 UTC+05	Meredov 52'; Agabaýew 81'	Report		Stadium: Pakhtakor Markaziy Stadium; Attendance: 6,000; Referee: Kwon Jong-chul (South Korea)

25 April 2002 World Cup qualification first round	Chinese Taipei	0–2	Jordan	Tashkent, Uzbekistan
16:00 UTC+05		Report	Al-Laham 16'; Shelbaieh 57'	Stadium: Pakhtakor Markaziy Stadium; Attendance: 5,000; Referee: Yoshitsugu Katayama (Japan)

27 April 2002 World Cup qualification first round	Uzbekistan	2–2	Jordan	Tashkent, Uzbekistan
16:00 UTC+05	Maminov 53' (pen.); Shirshov 65'	Report	Al-Shagran 13'; Abu Touk 24'	Stadium: Pakhtakor Markaziy Stadium; Attendance: 55,000; Referee: Ahmad Khalidi Supian (Malaysia)

3 May 2002 World Cup qualification first round	Jordan	6–0	Chinese Taipei	Amman, Jordan
17:30 UTC+03	Abu Touk 45', 49' (pen.); Al-Shagran 61'; Al-Awadat 85'; Hamarsheh 87', 89'	Report		Stadium: Amman International Stadium; Attendance: 8,000; Referee: Selearajen Subramaniam (Malaysia)

5 May 2002 World Cup qualification first round	Jordan	1–2	Turkmenistan	Amman, Jordan
20:00 UTC+03	Abu Touk 7'	Report	Gogoladze 25'; Durdyýew 85'	Stadium: Amman International Stadium; Attendance: 4,000; Referee: Santhan Nagalingam (Singapore)

7 May 2002 World Cup qualification first round	Jordan	1–1	Uzbekistan	Amman, Jordan
20:00 UTC+03	Abu Touk 54' (pen.)	Report	Maminov 77' (pen.)	Stadium: Amman International Stadium; Attendance: 100; Referee: Khaled Sadeq (Kuwait)

=== 2002 ===
9 February Malta International Football Tournament	Malta	2–1	Jordan	Ta' Qali, Malta
	Mifsud 7'; Brincat 62'	Report	Abu Zema 58' (pen.)	Stadium: National Stadium; Attendance: 784; Referee: Vladimir Antonov (Moldova)

11 February Malta International Football Tournament	Moldova	2–0	Jordan	Ta' Qali, Malta
	Golban 16', 69'	Report		Stadium: National Stadium; Attendance: 700; Referee: Anton Zammit (Malta)

13 February Malta International Football Tournament	Lithuania	0–3	Jordan	Ta' Qali, Malta
	Al-Shaqran 33'; Semrin 47' (pen.); Salim 82'	Report		Stadium: National Stadium; Attendance: 250; Referee: Lawrence Sammut (Malta)

17 August Friendly	Jordan	1–1	Kenya	Amman, Jordan
		Report		Stadium: Amman International Stadium

19 August Friendly	Jordan	0–0	Sudan	Amman, Jordan
		Report		Stadium: Amman International Stadium

30 August 2002 WAFF Championship Group A	Iran	0–1	Jordan	Damascus, Syria
	Salim 11'	Report		Stadium: Abbasiyyin Stadium

1 September 2002 WAFF Championship Group A	Lebanon	0–1	Jordan	Damascus, Syria
		Report	Shelbaieh 4'	Stadium: Abbasiyyin Stadium

5 September 2002 WAFF Championship semi-finals	Jordan	2–1 (a.e.t.)	Syria	Damascus, Syria
	Salim 38'; Al-Zboun 118'	Report	Shehadeh 54'	Stadium: Abbasiyyin Stadium

7 September 2002 WAFF Championship final	Iraq	3–2 (a.e.t.)	Jordan	Damascus, Syria
	Farhan 32'; Y.Mahmoud 89'; H.Mahmoud 103'	Report	Shehdeh 2'; Deeb 30'	Stadium: Abbasiyyin Stadium

29 November Independence Tournament	Jordan	1–0	Malaysia	United Arab Emrites
		Report

30 November Independence Tournament	Jordan	3–1	Singapore	United Arab Emrites
		Report

7 December Prime Minister's Cup	Bahrain	0–3	Jordan	Manama, Bahrain
		Report		Stadium: Bahrain National Stadium

9 December Prime Minister's Cup	Jordan	0–0	China	Manama, Bahrain
		Report

16 December Prime Minister's Cup	Palestine	1–1	Jordan	Manama, Bahrain
		Report

12 December Prime Minister's Cup	Jordan	3–0	Syria	Manama, Bahrain
		Report

18 December 2002 Arab Cup Group A	Morocco U23	1–1	Jordan	Kuwait City, Kuwait
	Kaïssi 4'	Report	Abu Zema 64' (pen.)	Stadium: Al Kuwait Sports Club Stadium; Attendance: 1,500; Referee: Abdul Rahman Al-Zeid (Saudi Arabia

20 December 2002 Arab Cup Group A	Jordan	2–1	Sudan	Kuwait City, Kuwait
	Salim 17'; Abu Zema 82' (pen.)	Report	Ali 84'	Stadium: Al Kuwait Sports Club Stadium; Attendance: 2,000; Referee: Mahmoud Abbas (Syria)

23 December 2002 Arab Cup Group A	Jordan	2–1	Kuwait	Kuwait City, Kuwait
	Al-Zboun 69', 83'	Report	B. Abdullah 86'	Stadium: Al Kuwait Sports Club Stadium; Attendance: 6,000; Referee: Hisham Qirat (Tunisia)

28 December 2002 Arab Cup semi-finals	Bahrain	2–1 (a.e.t.)	Jordan	Kuwait City, Kuwait
	Ali 79', 91'	Report	Al-Zboun 43'	Stadium: Al Kuwait Sports Club Stadium; Attendance: 2,000; Referee: Qassem Hamza (Kuwait)

=== 2003 ===
26 August Friendly	Jordan	2–1	Iraq	Amman, Jordan
		Report		Stadium: Amman International Stadium

5 September 2004 Asian Cup qualification	Iran	4–1	Jordan	Tehran, Iran
	Ali Daei 45', 90'; Nekounam 75'; Mobali 80'	Report	Mo'ayyad Salim 2'	Stadium: Azadi Stadium

19 September Friendly	Jordan	0–0	Syria	Amman, Jordan
		Report		Stadium: Amman International Stadium

26 September 2004 Asian Cup qualification	Jordan	3–2	Iran	Amman, Jordan
	Mo'ayyad Salim 41'; Shelbaieh 45'; Al-Shaqran 81'	Report	Mo'ayyad Salim 2'	Stadium: Amman International Stadium; Attendance: 27,000

8 October Friendly	Oman	2–1	Jordan	Muscat, Oman
		Report		Stadium: Sultan Qaboos Sports Complex

10 October Friendly	Oman	2–1	Jordan	Muscat, Oman
		Report		Stadium: Sultan Qaboos Sports Complex

17 October 2004 Asian Cup qualification	Jordan	1–0	Lebanon	Amman, Jordan
	Hatem Aqel 8' (pen.)	Report		Stadium: Amman International Stadium

12 November 2004 Asian Cup qualification	Lebanon	0–2	Jordan	Beirut, Lebanon
		Report	Hassouneh Al-Sheikh 37'; Al-Shaqran 65'

18 November 2004 Asian Cup qualification	Jordan	3–0	North Korea	Amman, Jordan
		Report	Shelbaieh 7'; Al-Shboul 89'; Anas Al-Zboun 90'	Stadium: Amman International Stadium

28 November 2004 Asian Cup qualification	North Korea	0–3 (awarded) (Note: The match was not played as North Korean immigration officials did not issue the Jordanian team visas, meaning they were refused entry into the country. The match was awarded 3–0 to Jordan, while North Korea were banned from AFC competitions for a year and from qualifying for the 2007 Asian Cup.)	Jordan	Pyongyang, North Korea
		Report	Shelbaieh 7'; Al-Shboul 89'; Anas Al-Zboun 90'

=== 2004 ===
13 February Friendly	Jordan	2–1	Indonesia	Amman, Jordan
		Report		Stadium: Amman International Stadium; Attendance: 2,500

18 February 2006 World Cup qualification second round	Jordan	5–0	Laos	Amman, Jordan
	Aqel 40'; Shelbaieh 45'; Al-Shagran 63'; Ragheb 90'; Shehdeh 90+2'	Report		Stadium: Amman International Stadium; Attendance: 5,000; Referee: Sultan Al Mozahmi (Oman)

21 March Friendly	Bahrain	0–0	Jordan	Riffa, Bahrain
		Report		Stadium: Bahrain National Stadium

23 March Friendly	Bahrain	0–2	Jordan	Riffa, Bahrain
		Report		Stadium: Bahrain National Stadium

31 March 2006 World Cup qualification second round	Jordan	1–0	Qatar	Amman, Jordan
18:30	Salim 70'	Report		Stadium: Amman International Stadium; Attendance: 15,000; Referee: Qasem Shaban (Kuwait)

28 April 2004 LG Cup Four Nations semi-finals	Nigeria	2–0	Jordan	Lagos, Nigeria
	Akwueme 16'; Nworgu 82'	Report		Stadium: National Stadium

30 April 2004 LG Cup Four Nations third place match	Libya	1–0	Jordan	Lagos, Nigeria
	Rewane 37'	Report		Stadium: National Stadium

19 May Friendly	Cyprus	0–0	Jordan	Larnaca, Cyprus
18:00 UTC+3		Report		Stadium: GSZ Stadium; Attendance: 2,500; Referee: Loizos Loizou (Cyprus)

30 May Friendly	Algeria	1–1	Jordan	Annaba, Algeria
	Cherrad 60'	Report	18' Shelbaïeh	Stadium: Stade 19 Mai 1956; Attendance: 35.000; Referee: Adel Zehmoun (Tunisia)

9 June 2006 World Cup qualification second round	Iran	0–1	Jordan	Tehran, Iran
18:30		Report	Al-Shboul 83'	Stadium: Azadi Stadium; Attendance: 35,000; Referee: Toru Kamikawa (Japan)

17 June 2004 WAFF Championship Group A	Palestine	1–1	Jordan	Tehran, Iran
	Al-Kord 12'	Report	Al-Shboul 3'	Stadium: Azadi Stadium

21 June 2004 WAFF Championship Group A	Jordan	2–0	Iraq	Tehran, Iran
	Salim 48'; Shelbaieh 79'	Report		Stadium: Azadi Stadium

23 June 2004 WAFF Championship semi-finals	Jordan	1–1 (a.e.t.) (3–4 p)	Syria	Tehran, Iran
	Amer Deeb 21'	Report	Rafe 55'	Stadium: Azadi Stadium

25 June 2004 WAFF Championship third place match	Jordan	3–1	Iraq	Tehran, Iran
	Al-Shagran 27', 47'; Abu Alieh 76'	Report	E. Mohammed 81'	Stadium: Azadi Stadium

8 July Friendly	Thailand	0–0	Jordan	Bangkok, Thailand
		Report		Stadium: Stadium: Supachalasai Stadium

19 July 2004 Aisan Cup Group B	South Korea	0–0	Jordan	Jinan, China
18:30		Report		Stadium: Shandong Sports Center; Attendance: 26,000; Referee: Shamsul Maidin (Singapore)

23 July 2004 Aisan Cup Group B	Jordan	2–0	Kuwait	Jinan, China
18:30	Saad 90+1'; Al-Zboun 90+2'	Report		Stadium: Shandong Sports Center; Referee: Lu Jun (China)

27 July 2004 Aisan Cup Group B	Jordan	0–0	United Arab Emirates	Beijing, China
19:00	Lee Dong-gook 25', 41'; Cha Du-ri 45+1'; Ahn Jung-hwan 75'	Report		Stadium: Workers' Stadium; Attendance: 25,000; Referee: Talaat Najm (Lebanon)

30 July 2004 Aisan Cup quarter-finals	Japan	1–1 (a.e.t.) (4–3 p)	Jordan	Chongqing, China
19:00	Suzuki 14'	Report	Shelbaieh 11'	Stadium: Chongqing Olympic Sports Center; Attendance: 52,000; Referee: Subkhiddin Mohd Salleh (Malaysia)
	Penalties
	Nakamura (penalty missed); Alex (penalty missed); Fukunishi (penalty scored); Nakata (penalty scored); Suzuki (penalty scored); Nakazawa (penalty missed); Miyamoto (penalty scored)		(penalty scored) Abu Zema; (penalty scored) Al-Awadat; (penalty scored) Aqel; (penalty missed) Al-Shboul; (penalty missed) Ibrahim; (penalty missed) Al-Zboun; (penalty missed) Bani Yaseen

18 August Friendly	Jordan	1–1	Azerbaijan	Amman, Jordan
		Report		Stadium: Amman International Stadium; Attendance: 10,000

31 August Friendly	Jordan	2–2	Lebanon	Amman, Jordan
		Report		Stadium: Amman International Stadium

8 September 2006 World Cup qualification second round	Jordan	0–2	Iran	Amman, Jordan
20:00		Report	Vahedi 80'; Daei 91'	Stadium: Amman International Stadium; Attendance: 20,000; Referee: Lu Jun (China PR)

8 October Friendly	Thailand	2–3	Jordan	Pathum Thani, Thailand
	Narasak Saisang 24'; Therdsak Chaiman 55'	Report	Abdel-Hadi Al-Maharmeh 28', 42'; Mustafa Shehdeh 61'	Stadium: Thammasat Stadium

13 October 2006 World Cup qualification second round	Laos	2–3	Jordan	Vientiane, Laos
19:00	Phaphouvanin 13'; Thongphachan 53'	Report	Al-Maharmeh 28'; Al-Shagran 73', 76'	Stadium: Laos National Stadium; Attendance: 3,000; Referee: Ram Gosh (Bangladesh)

20 October 2004 Libya LG Cup semi-finals	Jordan	3–0	Ecuador	Tripoli, Libya
	Saad 53'; Shelbaieh 56', 77'	Report		Stadium: Tripoli Stadium

22 October 2004 Libya LG Cup final	Libya	1–0	Jordan	Tripoli, Libya
	Kara 59' (pen.)	Report		Stadium: Tripoli Stadium; Attendance: 60,000

11 November Friendly	United Arab Emirates	4–0	Jordan	Dubai, United Arab Emirates
??:?? UTC+4	Khalil 43'; Matar 64'; Khater 66', 82'	Report		Stadium: Rashid Stadium

17 November 2006 World Cup qualification second round	Qatar	2–0	Jordan	Doha, Qatar
19:00	Al-Mal 60'; Al Khater 75'	Report		Stadium: Al-Gharafa Stadium; Attendance: 800; Referee: Toshimitsu Yoshida (Japan)

=== 2005 ===
28 January Friendly	Jordan	0–0	Norway	Amman, Jordan
		Report		Stadium: Amman International Stadium; Attendance: 8,000

26 March Friendly	Cyprus	2–1	Jordan	Larnaca , Cyprus
		Report		Stadium: GSZ Stadium

8 June Friendly	Jordan	0–1	Iraq	Amman, Jordan
		Report		Stadium: Amman International Stadium

17 August Friendly	Jordan	0–0	Armenia	Amman, Jordan
		Report		Stadium: Amman International Stadium; Attendance: 200

16 November Friendly	Georgia	3–2	Jordan	Tbilisi, Georgia
		Report		Stadium: Mikheil Meskhi

=== 2006 ===
17 January Friendly	Jordan	0–2	Ivory Coast	Abu Dhabi, United Arab Emirates
		Report	Drogba 30'; Akalé 80'	Stadium: Shaikh Zayed Stadium

23 January Friendly	Jordan	0–0	Sweden	Abu Dhabi, United Arab Emirates
		Report	Drogba 30'; Akalé 80'	Stadium: Al-Nahyan Stadium

1 February Friendly	Thailand	0–0	Jordan	Ayutthaya, Thailand
		Report	Drogba 30'; Akalé 80'	Stadium: Ayutthaya Main Stadium

7 February Friendly	Kuwait	2–1	Jordan	Kuwait City, Kuwait
		Report		Stadium: Jaber Al-Ahmad International Stadium

14 February Friendly	Jordan	2–0	Kazakhstan	Amman, Jordan
		Report		Stadium: Amman International Stadium

22 February 2007 Asian Cup qualification	Jordan	3–0	Pakistan	Amman, Jordan
	Aqel 30' (pen.); Shelbaieh 38'; Al-Shagran 41'	(Report)		Stadium: Amman International Stadium

1 March 2007 Asian Cup qualification	Oman	3–0	Jordan	Muscat, Oman
		(Report)		Stadium: Royal Oman Police Stadium

21 July Friendly	Jordan	2–1	Iraq	Amman, Jordan
	https://www.worldfootball.net/match-report/co571/fifa-friendlies/ma434449/jordan_iraq/lineup/			Stadium: Amman International Stadium

30 July Friendly	Jordan	3–0	Syria	Amman, Jordan
		Report		Stadium: Amman International Stadium

9 August Friendly	Jordan	0–1	Iraq	Amman, Jordan
		Report		Stadium: Amman International Stadium

16 August 2007 Asian Cup qualification	Jordan	1–2	United Arab Emirates	Amman, Jordan
		(Report)		Stadium: Amman International Stadium; Attendance: 9,000

2 September Friendly	Bahrain	3–0	Jordan	Riffa, Bahrain
		Report		Stadium: Bahrain National Stadium

6 September 2007 Asian Cup qualification	United Arab Emirates	0–0	Jordan	Amman, Jordan
		(Report)		Stadium: Amman International Stadium

6 October Friendly	Jordan	0–0	Iran	Amman, Jordan
		Report		Stadium: Amman International Stadium; Attendance: 2,000; Referee: Abdullah Al-Balooshi (Qatar)

11 October 2007 Asian Cup qualification	Pakistan	0–3	Jordan	Lahore, Pakistan
		(Report)	Abdel-Hadi Al-Maharmeh 16'; Ra'fat Ali 37'; Khaled Saad 85'	Stadium: Punjab Stadium; Attendance: 4,000; Referee: Dilovar Orzuev (Tajikistan)

8 November Friendly	Saudi Arabia	2–1	Jordan	Riyadh, Saudi Arabia
	Al-Suwailh 74', 90'	Report		Stadium: Prince Faisal bin Fahd Stadium

15 November 2007 Asian Cup qualification	Jordan	3–0	Oman	Amman, Jordan
	Amer Deeb 80'; Ra'fat Ali 84'; Al-Sheikh 90'	(Report)		Stadium: Amman International Stadium; Attendance: 3,000; Referee: Talaat Najm (Lebanon)

=== 2007 ===
8 June Friendly	Jordan	1–1	Iraq	Amman, Jordan
		Report	Drogba 30'; Akalé 80'	Stadium: Amman International Stadium

12 June Friendly	Jordan	0–0	Iraq	Amman, Jordan
		Report	Drogba 30'; Akalé 80'	Stadium: Amman International Stadium

18 June 2007 WAFF Championship Group A	Jordan	0–1	Syria	Amman, Jordan
		RSSSF	Al Baba 48'	Stadium: Amman International Stadium

20 June 2007 WAFF Championship Group A	Jordan	3–0	Lebanon	Amman, Jordan
	Ragheb 28'; Khaled Saad 53'; Al-Saify 58'	RSSSF		Stadium: Amman International Stadium

22 June 2007 WAFF Championship semi-finals	Iran	1–0	Jordan	Amman, Jordan
	Rajabzadeh 32'	RSSSF		Stadium: Amman International Stadium

7 September Friendly	Bahrain	1–1	Jordan	Riffa, Bahrain
		Report		Stadium: Bahrain National Stadium

18 October 2010 World Cup qualification first round	Kyrgyzstan	2–0	Jordan	Bishkek, Kyrgyzstan
	Esenkul Uulu 45'; Bokoev 76'	Report		Stadium: Spartak Stadium; Attendance: 18,000; Referee: Subrata Sarkar (India)

28 October 2010 World Cup qualification first round	Jordan	2–0 (a.e.t.) (6–5 p)	Kyrgyzstan	Amman, Jordan
	Shelbaieh 34' Aqel 51' (pen.)	Report		Stadium: Amman International Stadium; Attendance: 12,000; Referee: Abdulhameed Ebrahim (Bahrain)
	Penalties
	Abu Alieh (penalty scored); Bawab (penalty scored); Abu Keshek (penalty scored); Amer (penalty scored); Aqel (penalty scored); Bashar (penalty scored)		(penalty scored) Kudrenko; (penalty scored) Harchenko; (penalty scored) Samsaliev; (penalty scored) Sydykov; (penalty scored) Esenkul Uulu; (penalty missed) Amin
Note: 2–2 on aggregate; Jordan won 6–5 on penalties.

11 November Friendly	Oman	0–3	Jordan	Mascat, Oman
		Report		Stadium: Sultan Qaboos Sports Complex

=== 2008 ===
24 January Friendly	Iraq	1–1	Jordan	Basra, Iraq
		Report

28 January Friendly	Jordan	4–1	Lebanon	Amman, Jordan
	Ragheb 29'; Shelabya 78'; Deeb 81'; Ali 87'	Report	Ali 77'	Stadium: Amman International Stadium

31 January Friendly	Jordan	2–1	Singapore	Amman, Jordan
		Report		Stadium: Amman International Stadium

6 February 2010 World Cup qualification third round	Jordan	0–1	North Korea	Amman, Jordan
17:00 UTC+2		Report	Hong Yong-jo 44'	Stadium: Amman International Stadium; Attendance: 16,000; Referee: Tayeb Shamsuzzaman (Bangladesh)

16 March Friendly	Qatar	2–1	Jordan	Doha, Qatar
		Report		Stadium: Khalifa International Stadium

22 March Friendly	Uzbekistan	4–1	Jordan	Tashkent, Uzbekistan
		Report

26 March 2010 World Cup qualification third round	Turkmenistan	0–2	Jordan	Ashgabat, Turkmenistan
17:00 UTC+5	Al-Bzour 33'; Bawab 86'	Report		Stadium: Ashgabat Olympic Stadium; Attendance: 20,000; Referee: Satop Tongkhan (Thailand)

25 May Friendly	China	2–0	Jordan	Beijing, China
	Junmin Hao 24' (pen.); Weifeng Li 48'	Report		Stadium: Workers' Stadium

31 May 2010 World Cup qualification third round	South Korea	2–2	Jordan	Seoul, South Korea
20:00 UTC+9	Park Ji-sung 39'; Park Chu-young 48' (pen.)	Report	Abdel-Fattah 73', 80'	Stadium: Seoul World Cup Stadium; Attendance: 50,000; Referee: Mark Shield (Australia)

7 May 2010 World Cup qualification third round	Jordan	0–1	South Korea	Amman, Jordan
20:00 UTC+9		Report	Park Chu-young 24' (pen.)	Stadium: King Abdullah Stadium; Attendance: 8,000; Referee: Masoud Moradi (Iran)

14 June 2010 World Cup qualification third round	North Korea	2–0	Jordan	Pyongyang, North Korea
20:00 UTC+9	Hong Yong-jo 44', 72'	Report		Stadium: Yanggakdo Stadium; Attendance: 25,000; Referee: Talaat Najm (Lebanon)

22 June 2010 World Cup qualification third round	Jordan	2–0	Turkmenistan	Amman, Jordan
18:00 UTC+3	Abdel Fattah 66', 67'	Report		Stadium: Amman International Stadium; Attendance: 150; Referee: Ben Williams (Australia)

7 August 2008 WAFF Championship Group B	Syria	0–0	Jordan	Tehran, Iran
		RSSSF.com		Stadium: Takhti Stadium

11 August 2008 WAFF Championship Group B	Jordan	3–1	Oman	Tehran, Iran
	Abdel-Fattah 6'; Al-Nawateer 71', 84'	RSSSF.com	Katkoot 26' (pen.)	Stadium: Takhti Stadium

13 August 2008 WAFF Championship semi-finals	Jordan	3–0	Qatar	Tehran, Iran
	Al-Sheikh 45'; Amer Deeb 71'; Al-Saify 90'	RSSSF.com	Katkoot 26' (pen.)	Stadium: Takhti Stadium

15 August 2008 WAFF Championship final	Iran	2–1	Jordan	Tehran, Iran
	Aghily 21' (pen.); K. Rahmati 85'	RSSSF.com	Amer Deeb 82'	Stadium: Azadi Stadium; Attendance: 10,000; Referee: Mohamed Al Zarouni (United Arab Emirates)

5 September Friendly	South Korea	1–0	Jordan	Seoul, South Korea
	Chung-yong Lee 5'	Report		Stadium: Seoul World Cup Stadium; Attendance: 16,537

26 October Friendly	Palestine	1–1	Jordan	Gaza City, Palestine
		Report		Stadium: Palestine Stadium

14 November Friendly	Oman	2–0	Jordan	Muscat, Oman
		Report		Stadium: Sultan Qaboos Sports Complex

21 December Friendly	Jordan	0–1	China	Amman, Jordan
		Report	Cao Yang 77'	Stadium: Amman International Stadium

=== 2009 ===
14 January 2011 Asian Cup qualification	Jordan	0–0	Thailand	Amman, Jordan
17:00 UTC+2		Report		Stadium: Amman International Stadium; Attendance: 5,000; Referee: Abdul-Rahman Rashu (Syria)

28 January 2011 Asian Cup qualification	Singapore	2–1	Jordan	Kallang, Singapore
19:30 UTC+8	Casmir 21'; Alam Shah 63'	Report	Aqel 41' (pen.)	Stadium: National Stadium; Attendance: 6,188; Referee: Peter Green (Australia)

13 May Friendly	Jordan	2–0	Zimbabwe	Amman, Jordan
		Report		Stadium: Amman International Stadium

3 June Friendly	Bahrain	4–0	Jordan	Riffa, Bahrain
		Report

5 September Friendly	Jordan	0–0	Malaysia	Amman, Jordan
		Report		Stadium: Amman International Stadium

9 September Friendly	Jordan	1–3	New Zealand	Amman, Jordan
		Report	Smeltz 17' (pen.), 65'; Fallon 45'	Stadium: King Abdullah II Stadium

10 October Friendly	Kuwait	2–1	Jordan	Kuwait City, Kuwait
		Report		Stadium: Jaber Al-Ahmad International Stadium

14 October Friendly	United Arab Emirates	2–1	Jordan	Dubai, United Arab Emirates
	Al-Shehhi 35'; Al Khalifi 56'; Srour 79' (pen.)	Report	Deeb 68'	Stadium: Maktoum bin Rashid Al Maktoum Stadium; Referee: Abdullah Al Hilali (Oman)

14 November 2011 Asian Cup qualification	Iran	1–0	Jordan	Tehran, Iran
18:00 UTC+3:30	Nekounam 72'			Stadium: Azadi Stadium; Attendance: 15,000; Referee: Yuichi Nishimura (Japan)

22 November 2011 Asian Cup qualification	Jordan	1–0	Iran	Amman, Jordan
18:00 UTC+2	Deeb 78'			Stadium: King Abdullah Stadium; Attendance: 11,000; Referee: Ali Hamad Al-Badwawi (United Arab Emirates)

30 December Friendly	China	2–2	Jordan	Yiwu, China
	Linpeng Zhang 46'; Peng Han 55'	Report		Stadium: Meihu Sports Centre

== Head-to-head records ==
As of match played 30 December 2009 against China

Key

Positive balance (more wins than losses)
Neutral balance (as many wins as losses)
Negative balance (more losses than wins)

Head to head records
Opponent	P	W	D	L	GF	GA	W%	D%	L%
Algeria	1	0	1	0	0	0	0	100	0
Armenia	1	0	1	0	0	0	0	100	0
Azerbaijan	1	0	1	0	0	0	0	100	0
Bahrain	9	4	2	3	12	11	44.44	22.22	33.33
Bosnia and Herzegovina	2	0	1	1	1	2	0	50	50
Bulgaria	1	0	0	1	0	2	0	0	100
China	5	0	3	2	2	3	0	60	40
Chinese Taipei	2	2	0	0	8	0	100	0	0
Cyprus	2	0	1	1	1	2	0	50	50
Ecuador	1	1	0	0	3	0	100	0	0
Georgia	1	0	0	1	2	3	0	100	0
Hong Kong	1	1	0	0	2	0	100	0	0
Hungary	1	0	1	0	1	1	0	100	0
Indonesia	1	1	0	0	2	1	100	0	0
Iran	11	4	1	6	0	0	36.36	9.09	54.55
Iraq	13	4	4	5	14	14	30.77	30.77	38.46
Ivory Coast	1	0	0	1	0	2	0	0	100
Japan (Note: Includes Japan University XI matches in the Millennium Super Soccer Cup.)	2	0	1	1	1	5	0	50	50
Kazakhstan	2	1	0	1	2	1	50	0	50
Kenya	1	0	1	0	1	1	0	100	0
Kuwait	4	2	0	2	6	5	50	0	50
Kyrgyzstan	3	2	0	1	4	2	66.67	0	33.33
Laos	2	2	0	0	8	2	100	0	0
Lebanon	10	5	5	0	16	6	50	50	0
Libya	2	0	0	2	0	2	0	0	100
Lithuania	1	1	0	0	3	0	100	0	0
Malaysia	2	1	1	0	0	1	50	50	0
Malta	1	0	0	1	1	2	0	0	100
Moldova	1	0	0	1	0	2	0	0	100
Morocco U23	1	0	1	0	1	1	0	100	0
New Zealand	1	0	0	1	1	3	0	0	100
Nigeria	1	0	0	1	0	2	0	0	100
North Korea	6	3	0	3	7	5	50	0	50
Norway	1	0	1	0	0	0	0	100	0
Oman	5	2	0	3	7	8	40	0	60
Pakistan	2	2	0	0	6	0	100	0	0
Palestine	4	1	3	0	8	4	25	75	0
Qatar	6	2	1	3	8	9	33.33	33.33	50
Romania	1	1	0	0	1	0	100	0	0
Saudi Arabia	2	1	0	1	2	2	50	0	50
Singapore	3	2	0	1	6	4	66.67	0	33.33
South Korea	4	0	2	2	2	4	0	50	50
Sudan	1	0	1	0	0	0	0	100	0
Sweden	1	0	1	0	0	0	0	100	0
Syria	10	3	5	2	9	5	30	50	20
Thailand	4	1	3	0	3	2	25	75	0
Turkmenistan	2	2	0	0	4	0	100	0	0
United Arab Emirates	5	0	2	3	2	8	0	40	60
Uzbekistan	3	0	2	1	5	7	0	66.67	33.33
Zimbabwe	1	1	0	0	2	0	100	0	0
