= Jordan at the AFC Asian Cup =

Jordan national football team has been historically considered weaker than other Arab teams prior to the beginning of new millennium. Jordan often struggled to win a ticket and qualify for the Asian Cup, mainly, due to a weaker league and not many players competing professionally.

However, once Jordan polished themselves in order to join the new world, Jordanian football also witnessed significant positive changes. Jordan qualified for their first Asian Cup in 2004, before they did it again in 2011, 2015, 2019 and 2023. In the first two editions, Jordan stunned all predictions by drawing and defeating many Asian powerhouses such as South Korea, Japan and Saudi Arabia, and they were considered a heavy underdog which qualified for the quarter-finals twice, their best result to date. In 2015 however, Jordan for the first time, had to go home from the group stage. In 2019 they reached the round of 16 and in 2023 edition they have now reached the finals.

== Overall record ==
| AFC Asian Cup record | | | | | | | | | Qualification record | | | | | |
| Year | Round | Position | Pld | W | D* | L | GF | GA | Pld | W | D | L | GF | GA |
|---|---|---|---|---|---|---|---|---|---|---|---|---|---|---|
| (Hong Kong) 1956 | Did not enter | | | | | | | | Did not enter | | | | | |
| (South Korea) 1960 | Did not enter | | | | | | | | Did not enter | | | | | |
| (Israel) 1964 | Did not enter | | | | | | | | Did not enter | | | | | |
| (Iran) 1968 | Did not enter | | | | | | | | Did not enter | | | | | |
| (Thailand) 1972 | Did not qualify | | | | | | | | 6 | 2 | 1 | 3 | 5 | 9 |
| (Iran) 1976 | Did not enter | | | | | | | | Did not enter | | | | | |
| (Kuwait) 1980 | Did not enter | | | | | | | | Did not enter | | | | | |
| (Singapore) 1984 | Did not qualify | | | | | | | | 4 | 1 | 1 | 2 | 7 | 10 |
| (Qatar) 1988 | Did not qualify | | | | | | | | 4 | 1 | 3 | 0 | 2 | 1 |
| (Japan) 1992 | Did not enter | | | | | | | | Did not enter | | | | | |
| (United Arab Emirates) 1996 | Did not qualify | | | | | | | | 2 | 1 | 0 | 1 | 4 | 1 |
| (Lebanon) 2000 | Did not qualify | | | | | | | | 4 | 2 | 1 | 1 | 12 | 4 |
| (China) 2004 | Quarter-finals | 7th | 4 | 1 | 3 | 0 | 3 | 1 | 6 | 5 | 0 | 1 | 13 | 6 |
| (Indonesia) (Malaysia) (Thailand) (Vietnam) 2007 | Did not qualify | | | | | | | | 6 | 3 | 1 | 2 | 10 | 5 |
| (Qatar) 2011 | Quarter-finals | 6th | 4 | 2 | 1 | 1 | 5 | 4 | 6 | 2 | 2 | 2 | 4 | 4 |
| (Australia) 2015 | Group stage | 9th | 3 | 1 | 0 | 2 | 5 | 4 | 6 | 3 | 3 | 0 | 10 | 3 |
| (United Arab Emirates) 2019 | Round of 16 | 9th | 4 | 2 | 2 | 0 | 4 | 1 | 14 | 8 | 4 | 2 | 37 | 12 |
| (Qatar) 2023 | Runners-up | 2nd | 7 | 4 | 1 | 2 | 13 | 8 | 11 | 7 | 2 | 2 | 19 | 3 |
| (Saudi Arabia) 2027 | Qualified | | | | | | | | 6 | 4 | 1 | 1 | 16 | 4 |
| Total | 0 titles | 6/19 | 22 | 10 | 7 | 5 | 30 | 18 | 75 | 39 | 19 | 17 | 139 | 62 |

=== Record by opponent ===
AFC Asian Cup matches (by team)
| Opponent | Pld | W | D | L | GF | GA | GD |
|---|---|---|---|---|---|---|---|
| Australia | 1 | 1 | 0 | 0 | 1 | 0 | +1 |
| Bahrain | 1 | 0 | 0 | 1 | 0 | 1 | -1 |
| Iraq | 2 | 1 | 0 | 1 | 3 | 3 | 0 |
| Japan | 3 | 0 | 2 | 1 | 2 | 4 | -2 |
| Kuwait | 1 | 1 | 0 | 0 | 2 | 0 | +2 |
| Malaysia | 1 | 1 | 0 | 0 | 4 | 0 | +4 |
| Palestine | 2 | 1 | 1 | 0 | 5 | 1 | +4 |
| Qatar | 1 | 0 | 0 | 1 | 1 | 3 | -2 |
| Saudi Arabia | 1 | 1 | 0 | 0 | 1 | 0 | +1 |
| South Korea | 3 | 1 | 2 | 0 | 4 | 2 | +2 |
| Syria | 2 | 2 | 0 | 0 | 4 | 1 | +3 |
| Tajikistan | 1 | 1 | 0 | 0 | 1 | 0 | +1 |
| United Arab Emirates | 1 | 0 | 1 | 0 | 0 | 0 | 0 |
| Uzbekistan | 1 | 0 | 0 | 1 | 1 | 2 | -1 |
| Vietnam | 1 | 0 | 1 | 0 | 1 | 1 | 0 |

== Asian Cup 2004 ==
This was Jordan's first ever Asian Cup in their history, following a successful qualification campaign. Although considered to be an underdog, Jordan surprised by drawing South Korea 0–0 before beating Kuwait 2–0 and drew the UAE 0–0, therefore passed into the quarter-finals right on their debut. Jordan even performed better than expected, when they drew giant Japan 1-1 before losing 3–4 on the penalty shootout. Ironically, despite Jordan had led Japan 3–1 on penalty shootout, subsequent misses and failed kicks had eliminated Jordan from the tournament. Japan would go on to win the title.

=== Group B ===
| Team | Pld | W | D | L | GF | GA | GD | Pts |
|---|---|---|---|---|---|---|---|---|
| South Korea | 3 | 2 | 1 | 0 | 6 | 0 | +6 | 7 |
| Jordan | 3 | 1 | 2 | 0 | 2 | 0 | +2 | 5 |
| Kuwait | 3 | 1 | 0 | 2 | 3 | 7 | −4 | 3 |
| United Arab Emirates | 3 | 0 | 1 | 2 | 1 | 5 | −4 | 1 |

19 July 2004
18:30

| South Korea | 0–0 | Jordan |
|---|---|---|
| | Report |

Shandong Sports Center, Jinan
Attendance: 26,000
Referee: Shamsul Maidin (Singapore)

23 July 2004
18:30

| Jordan | 2–0 | Kuwait |
|---|---|---|
| Saad 90+1'; Al-Zboun 90+2' | Report |

Shandong Sports Center, Jinan
Attendance: 28,000
Referee: Lu Jun (China)

27 July 2004
19:00

| Jordan | 0–0 | United Arab Emirates |
|---|---|---|
| | Report |

Workers Stadium, Beijing
Attendance: 25,000
Referee: Talaat Najm (Lebanon)

=== Quarter-finals ===
31 July 2004
18:00

| Japan | 1–1 (a.e.t.) | Jordan |
|---|---|---|
| Suzuki 14' | Report | Shelbaieh 11' |
Penalties
| Nakamura (penalty missed); Alex (penalty missed); Fukunishi (penalty scored); Nakata (penalty scored); Suzuki (penalty scored); Nakazawa (penalty missed); Miyamoto (penalty scored) | 4–3 | (penalty scored) Abu Zema; (penalty scored) Al-Awadat; (penalty scored) Aqel; (penalty missed) Al-Shboul; (penalty missed) Ibrahim; (penalty missed) Al-Zboun; (penalty missed) Bani Yaseen |

Chongqing Olympic Sports Center, Chongqing
Attendance: 52,000
Referee: Subkhiddin Mohd Salleh (Malaysia)

== Asian Cup 2011 ==
Having missed out the 2007 edition, Jordan returned in 2011 edition and once again was drawn with Japan, together with 2007 runners-up Saudi Arabia and Syria. Similar to 2004, Jordan, one more time, shocked by drawing Japan 1–1 before defeating Saudi Arabia and Syria to qualify with seven points. Making itself a heavy underdog for the second times, Jordan, however, soon fell to Uzbekistan as the Uzbeks had shown to be more resilience than the Jordanians. The Turkic side would have defeated the Chivalrous 2–1 in the quarter-finals again, before winning fourth place for the first time. This was the best performance of Jordan in the Asian Cup.

=== Group B ===
| Team | Pld | W | D | L | GF | GA | GD | Pts |
|---|---|---|---|---|---|---|---|---|
| Japan | 3 | 2 | 1 | 0 | 8 | 2 | +6 | 7 |
| Jordan | 3 | 2 | 1 | 0 | 4 | 2 | +2 | 7 |
| Syria | 3 | 1 | 0 | 2 | 4 | 5 | −1 | 3 |
| Saudi Arabia | 3 | 0 | 0 | 3 | 1 | 8 | −7 | 0 |

9 January 2011
| Japan | 1–1 | Jordan |
13 January 2011
| Jordan | 1–0 | Saudi Arabia |
17 January 2011
| Jordan | 2–1 | Syria |

=== Quarter-finals ===
21 January 2011
19:30

| Uzbekistan | 2–1 | Jordan |
|---|---|---|
| Bakayev 47', 49' | Report | B. Bani Yaseen 58' |

Khalifa International Stadium, Doha
Attendance: 16,073
Referee: Malik Abdul Bashir (Singapore)

== Asian Cup 2015 ==
Jordan made their third debut by qualifying to the 2015 Asian Cup held in Australia. And, surprisingly once again, Jordan was drawn with Japan for the second times, together with Levant rivals Iraq and debutant Palestine. Having created a strong impression four years ago, Jordan was expected to at least, surprised again by qualifying to quarter-finals or even, reaching no.1 in the group. Their hopes were shattered by a 0–1 defeat to Iraq, before demolishing Palestine 5–1 with Hamza Al-Dardour made a double braces. Jordan would have met Japan in the last encounter, and they expected to even manage a surprising record again, having drawn Japan 1–1 in two previous encounters. Unfortunately, the Blue Samurais had learnt from their two previous mistakes and Jordan had to go home with a 0–2 defeat. This meant for the first time in their participancy, Jordan was out from the early stage.

=== Group D ===
| Pos | Team | Pld | W | D | L | GF | GA | GD | Pts | Qualification |
|---|---|---|---|---|---|---|---|---|---|---|
| 1 | Japan | 3 | 3 | 0 | 0 | 7 | 0 | +7 | 9 | Advance to knockout stage |
| 2 | Iraq | 3 | 2 | 0 | 1 | 3 | 1 | +2 | 6 | Advance to knockout stage |
| 3 | Jordan | 3 | 1 | 0 | 2 | 5 | 4 | +1 | 3 | |
| 4 | Palestine | 3 | 0 | 0 | 3 | 1 | 11 | −10 | 0 | |

Source: Asian Cup Australia 2015
Rules for classification: Tiebreakers

12 January 2015
| Jordan | 0–1 | Iraq | Brisbane Stadium, Brisbane |
16 January 2015
| Palestine | 1–5 | Jordan | AAMI Park, Melbourne |
20 January 2015
| Japan | 2–0 | Jordan | AAMI Park, Melbourne |

== Asian Cup 2019 ==
Jordan once again qualified to the Asian Cup, and for the second time in their participation, Jordan didn't join Japan in the same group. Instead, Jordan will have to face up defending champions Australia, alongside their Levant rivals Syria and Palestine, once again. Jordan had met Palestine in four years ago, while they faced Australia in 2018 World Cup qualification. Jordan also faced Syria in 2011 edition. However, due to history being an underdog, Jordan is expected to make surprise again.

Jordan opened their account by a shocking impressive 1–0 win over defending champions Australia thanked for a header by Anas Bani Yaseen and an incredible performance by Khalil Bani Attiah, who prevented every Australian attacks. This trend of impressive performance continued with a 2–0 victory over neighboring rival Syria. The win over Australia and Syria helped Jordan to top the group, becoming the first team to progress to the knockout stage of the edition. The last group stage match against Palestine, which had little impact on Jordan's position, ended 0–0, and Jordan consolidated their first place, ultimately sent them to the encounter against Vietnam in the round of sixteen with a perfect record, scoring three and conceding zero goals.

Jordan played against Vietnam in the first knockout stage's match. Prior to the encounter, Jordanian media and press had signaled in confident against Vietnam, the last team to qualify for the stage, and even confirmed for a full victory. Jordan eventually led 1–0 with a superb free kick by Baha' Abdel-Rahman. However, the second half witnessed a complete Vietnamese resurgence, with Nguyễn Công Phượng became the first player to net on Amer Shafi, turned the tie into a draw 1–1. The draw was maintained after 120', but with all confidences lost, Jordan failed on the penalty shootout to Vietnam with the score 2–4, ultimately sending Jordan out from the campaign.

=== Group B ===
| Pos | Team | Pld | W | D | L | GF | GA | GD | Pts | Qualification |
|---|---|---|---|---|---|---|---|---|---|---|
| 1 | Jordan | 3 | 2 | 1 | 0 | 3 | 0 | +3 | 7 | Advance to knockout stage |
| 2 | Australia | 3 | 2 | 0 | 1 | 6 | 3 | +3 | 6 | Advance to knockout stage |
| 3 | Palestine | 3 | 0 | 2 | 1 | 0 | 3 | −3 | 2 | |
| 4 | Syria | 3 | 0 | 1 | 2 | 2 | 5 | −3 | 1 | |

Source: AFC
6 January 2019
15:00

| Australia | 0–1 | Jordan |
|---|---|---|
| | Report | Bani Yaseen 26' |

Hazza bin Zayed Stadium, Al Ain
Attendance: 4,934
Referee: Ahmed Al-Kaf (Oman)

10 January 2019
17:30

| Jordan | 2–0 | Syria |
|---|---|---|
| Al-Taamari 26'; Khattab 43' | Report |

Khalifa bin Zayed Stadium, Al Ain
Attendance: 9,152
Referee: Kim Dong-jin (South Korea)

15 January 2019
17:30

| Palestine | 0–0 | Jordan |
|---|---|---|
| | Report |

Mohammed bin Zayed Stadium, Abu Dhabi
Attendance: 20,843
Referee: Mohanad Qassim (Iraq)

=== Round of 16 ===
20 January 2019
15:00

| Jordan | 1–1 (a.e.t.) | Vietnam |
|---|---|---|
| Abdel-Rahman 39' | Report | Nguyễn Công Phượng 51' |
Penalties
| Abdel-Rahman (penalty scored); Faisal (penalty missed); Samir (penalty missed); Ersan (penalty scored) | 2–4 | (penalty scored) Quế Ngọc Hải; (penalty scored) Đỗ Hùng Dũng; (penalty scored) Lương Xuân Trường; (penalty missed) Trần Minh Vương; (penalty scored) Bùi Tiến Dũng I |

Al Maktoum Stadium, Dubai
Attendance: 14,205
Referee: Alireza Faghani (Iran)

== Asian Cup 2023 ==
=== Group E ===
| Pos | Team | Pld | W | D | L | GF | GA | GD | Pts | Qualification |
|---|---|---|---|---|---|---|---|---|---|---|
| 1 | Bahrain | 3 | 2 | 0 | 1 | 3 | 3 | 0 | 6 | Advance to knockout stage |
| 2 | South Korea | 3 | 1 | 2 | 0 | 8 | 6 | +2 | 5 | Advance to knockout stage |
| 3 | Jordan | 3 | 1 | 1 | 1 | 6 | 3 | +3 | 4 | Advance to knockout stage |
| 4 | Malaysia | 3 | 0 | 1 | 2 | 3 | 8 | −5 | 1 | |

Source: AFC
15 January 2024
20:30

| Malaysia | 0–4 | Jordan |
|---|---|---|
| | Report | Al-Mardi 12', 32'; Al-Taamari 18' (pen.), 85' |

Al Janoub Stadium, Al Wakrah
Attendance: 20,410
Referee: Mohammed Abdulla Hassan Mohamed (United Arab Emirates)

20 January 2024
14:30

| Jordan | 2–2 | South Korea |
|---|---|---|
| Park Yong-woo 37' (o.g.); Al-Naimat 45+6' | Report | Son Heung-min 9' (pen.); Al-Arab 90+1' (o.g.) |

Al Thumama Stadium, Doha
Attendance: 36,627
Referee: Salman Falahi (Qatar)

25 January 2024
14:30

| Jordan | 0–1 | Bahrain |
|---|---|---|
| | Report | Helal 34' |

Khalifa International Stadium, Al Rayyan
Attendance: 39,650
Referee: Omar Al-Ali (United Arab Emirates)

Ranking of third-placed teams

| Pos | Grp | Team | Pld | W | D | L | GF | GA | GD | Pts | Qualification |
|---|---|---|---|---|---|---|---|---|---|---|---|
| 1 | E | Jordan | 3 | 1 | 1 | 1 | 6 | 3 | +3 | 4 | Advance to knockout stage |
| 2 | C | Palestine | 3 | 1 | 1 | 1 | 5 | 5 | 0 | 4 | Advance to knockout stage |
| 3 | B | Syria | 3 | 1 | 1 | 1 | 1 | 1 | 0 | 4 | Advance to knockout stage |
| 4 | D | Indonesia | 3 | 1 | 0 | 2 | 3 | 6 | −3 | 3 | Advance to knockout stage |
| 5 | F | Oman | 3 | 0 | 2 | 1 | 2 | 3 | −1 | 2 | |
| 6 | A | China | 3 | 0 | 2 | 1 | 0 | 1 | −1 | 2 | |

Source: AFC

=== Knockout stage ===
==== Round of 16 ====
29 January 2024
14:30

| Iraq | 2–3 | Jordan |
|---|---|---|
| Natiq 68'; Hussein 76' | Report | Al-Naimat 45+1'; Al-Arab 90+5'; Al-Rashdan 90+7' |

Khalifa International Stadium, Al Rayyan
Attendance: 35,814
Referee: Alireza Faghani (Australia)

==== Quarter-finals ====
2 February 2024
14:30

| Tajikistan | 0–1 | Jordan |
|---|---|---|
| | Report | Hanonov 66' (o.g.) |

Ahmad bin Ali Stadium, Al Rayyan
Attendance: 35,530
Referee: Fu Ming (China)

==== Semi-finals ====
6 February 2024
18:00

| Jordan | 2–0 | South Korea |
|---|---|---|
| Al-Naimat 53'; Al-Taamari 66' | Report |

Ahmad bin Ali Stadium, Al Rayyan
Attendance: 42,850
Referee: Mohammed Abdulla Hassan Mohamed (United Arab Emirates)

==== Final ====
10 February 2024
18:00

| Jordan | 1–3 | Qatar |
|---|---|---|
| Al-Naimat 67' | Report | Afif 22' (pen.), 73' (pen.), 90+5' (pen.) |

Lusail Stadium, Lusail
Attendance: 86,492
Referee: Ma Ning (China)
