= Faisal Ibrahim =

Jordanian footballer

Personal information
- Full name: Faisal Ibrahim Suleiman
- Date of birth: 22 September 1976 (age 50)
- Place of birth: Amman, Jordan
- Height: 1.78 m (5 ft 10 in)
- Position: Right back

Youth career
- 1990–1993: Al-Wehdat

Senior career*
Years	Team	Apps	(Gls)
1993–2010	Al-Wehdat		
1999–2000	→ Al-Shabab (loan)		

International career
1996–2008	Jordan	84	(1)
- * Club domestic league appearances and goals

Faisal Ibrahim Suleiman is a Jordanian retired footballer.

== International career ==
An international friendly match between was played between Jordan and Iraq on 16 September 2010 in Amman at the King Abdullah Stadium to mark Faisal's retirement, which resulted in a 4–1 victory for Jordan. After playing the first few minutes of the match, Faisal gave the captain armband to his teammate Hassouneh Al-Sheikh as well as his #16 jersey shirt to his younger teammate Basem Fat'hi.

== International goals ==
#	Date	Venue	Opponent	Score	Result	Competition
1	2001	Fatorda Stadium, Goa	Romania	1–0	Win	Friendly

== Honors and Participation in International Tournaments ==
=== In AFC Asian Cups ===
- 2004 Asian Cup

=== In Pan Arab Games ===
- 1997 Pan Arab Games
- 1999 Pan Arab Games

=== In Arab Nations Cup ===
- 1992 Arab Nations Cup
- 1998 Arab Nations Cup
- 2002 Arab Nations Cup

=== In WAFF Championships ===
- 2000 WAFF Championship
- 2002 WAFF Championship
- 2004 WAFF Championship
- 2007 WAFF Championship
