= Football at the 1999 Arab Games =

1999 Arab Games football tournament
Tournament details
- Host country: Jordan
- City: Amman
- Dates: 19–31 August 1999
- Teams: 11 (from 2 confederations)
- Venue: 2 (in 1 host city)

Final positions
- Champions: Jordan (2nd title)
- Runners-up: Iraq
- Third place: Libya; Palestine

Tournament statistics
- Matches played: 25
- Goals scored: 72 (2.88 per match)
- Top scorer(s): (Jordan) Badran Al-Shaqran (8 goals)

The 1999 Arab Games football tournament was the 9th edition of the Arab Games men's football tournament. The football tournament was held in Amman, Jordan between 19–31 August 1999 as part of the 1999 Arab Games.

== Participating teams ==
The following countries have participated for the final tournament:

- Bahrain Olympic
- Jordan (hosts)
- Iraq
- Lebanon
- Libya
- Oman
- Palestine
- Qatar Olympic
- Saudi Arabia Olympic
- Syria
- United Arab Emirates
- Algeria (withdrew)

== Group stages ==
=== First group stage ===
==== Group A ====
Team	Pld	W	D	L	GF	GA	GD	Pts
Jordan	2	2	0	0	5	0	+5	6
Palestine	2	1	0	1	1	2	−1	3
Qatar Olympic	2	0	0	2	0	4	−4	0

16 August 1999

Jordan	3–0	Qatar Olympic
Al-Sheikh 76'; Al-Shaqran 79'; Hamarsheh 90'

Amman International Stadium
Attendance: 23,000
Referee: (Egypt) Jamal Al-Ghandour

18 August 1999

Palestine	0–2	Jordan
		Abu Zema 35' 58'

Ref:

20 August 1999

Qatar Olympic	0–1	Palestine
		Hajjaj 42'

==== Group B ====
Team	Pld	W	D	L	GF	GA	GD	Pts
United Arab Emirates	2	1	1	0	3	1	+2	4
Lebanon	2	1	0	1	2	3	−1	3
Saudi Arabia Olympic	2	0	1	1	2	3	−1	1

16 August 1999

Saudi Arabia Olympic	1–2	Lebanon
Mosh'ael 25'		Ghazarian 13'; Kehyeyan 69'

Referee: (Tunisia) Mourad Al-Da'ami

18 August 1999

United Arab Emirates	1–1	Saudi Arabia Olympic
Jum'aa 24'		Marzouq 32'

Ref:

20 August 1999

Lebanon	0–2	United Arab Emirates
		Omar 63'; Sa'ad 75'

Referee: (Yemen) Abdul-Wahid Khamees

==== Group C ====
Algeria withdrew

Team	Pld	W	D	L	GF	GA	GD	Pts
Syria	1	0	1	0	1	1	0	1
Oman	1	0	1	0	1	1	0	1
Algeria	0	0	0	0	0	0	0	0

19 August 1999

Syria	1–1	Oman
Afash 11'; Haj Moustafa (red card) 61'		Al-Dhabit 61'

==== Group D ====
Team	Pld	W	D	L	GF	GA	GD	Pts
Libya	2	2	0	0	6	0	+6	6
Iraq	2	1	0	1	2	2	0	3
Bahrain Olympic	2	0	0	2	0	6	−6	0

17 August 1999

Libya	4–0	Bahrain Olympic
Ramadan 32'; Al Taib 38' 90'; Misrati 50'

Referee: (Jordan) Omar Bishtawi

19 August 1999

Bahrain Olympic	0–2	Iraq
		Fawzi 5'; Mahmoud 35'

21 August 1999

Iraq	0–2	Libya
		El Masli 41' 78'

=== Second group stage ===
==== Group A ====
Team	Pld	W	D	L	GF	GA	GD	Pts
Iraq	3	2	0	1	8	2	+6	6
Jordan	3	2	0	1	5	4	+1	6
Lebanon	3	1	1	1	4	6	−2	4
Oman	3	0	1	2	1	6	−5	1

23 August 1999

Jordan	1–3	Lebanon
Al-Shaqran 90'		Zein 42' 61' 88'

Amman International Stadium
Attendance: 30,000
Referee: (Egypt) Jamal Al-Ghandour
23 August 1999

Oman	0–3	Iraq
		Fawzi 4' 54' (pen.); Farhan 42'

Al Hassan Stadium
Attendance: 5,000

25 August 1999

Iraq	1–2	Jordan
Mohammed 87'		Hamarsheh 59'; Al-Shaqran 90'

Amman International Stadium
Attendance: 27,000
25 August 1999

Lebanon	1–1	Oman
Zein 21'		Sha'baan 50'

Al Hassan Stadium
Attendance: 7,000

27 August 1999

Iraq	4–0	Lebanon
Mohammed 7' 54'; Rahim 59'; Al-Heil 88'

Al Hassan Stadium
Attendance: 7,000
Referee: (Egypt) Jamal Al-Ghandour
27 August 1999

Jordan	2–0	Oman
Ali 59'; Al-Shboul 78'

Amman International Stadium
Attendance: 18,000
Referee: (Saudi Arabia) Yousef Al-'Aqaily

==== Group B ====
Team	Pld	W	D	L	GF	GA	GD	Pts
Palestine	3	1	2	0	4	3	+1	5
Libya	3	1	2	0	4	3	+1	5
Syria	3	0	3	0	4	4	0	3
United Arab Emirates	3	0	1	2	2	4	−2	1

23 August 1999

Palestine	1–0	United Arab Emirates
Lafi 35'; Helmi (red card) 79'; Al Nims (red card) 88'

Al Hassan Stadium
Attendance: 7,000
Referee: (Lebanon) Nabil Ayyad
23 August 1999

Syria	1–1	Libya
Afash 40'		Muntasser 50'

Al-Hussein Stadium
Attendance: 6,000

25 August 1999

Libya	2–2	Palestine
El Masli 27'; Mohamed 82' (pen.); El Masli (red card) 33'		Al Manasri 1'; Jendeya 90'; Haddad (red card) 37'

Amman International Stadium
Referee: (Tunisia) Mourad Al-Da'ami
25 August 1999

United Arab Emirates	2–2	Syria
Ali 33'; Harib 80'		Al-Sayed 35'; Afash 54'

Amman International Stadium

27 August 1999

United Arab Emirates	0–1	Libya
		Muntasser 62'

27 August 1999

Syria	1–1	Palestine
Al-Sayed 19'		Al-Kord 82'

Amman International Stadium
Attendance: 8,000
Referee: (Yemen) Abdulwaheed Al-Khamisi

== Knockout stage ==
Semifinals
29 August – Amman
Palestine	1
Jordan	4
29 August – Amman
Iraq	3
Libya	1

Final
31 August – Amman
Jordan (p)	4 (3)
Iraq	4 (1)

=== Semifinals ===
29 August 1999

Palestine	1–4	Jordan
Al-Kord 90'		Al-Shaqran 14' 67' 75'; Jummah 41'

Amman International Stadium
Attendance: 25,000
Referee: (Tunisia) Mourad Al-Da'ami

29 August 1999

Iraq	3–1	Libya
Jafar 3'; Fawzi 18'; Hamad 32'		El Masli 16'

Amman International Stadium
Attendance: 15,000
Referee: (Lebanon) Nabeel Ayaad

=== Final ===
31 August 1999

Jordan	4 – 4 (a.e.t.)	Iraq
Abu Zema 30' (pen.); Al-Shaqran 51', 70'; Shneishel 67' (o.g.)		Fawzi 73', 75' (pen.); Mahmoud 78'; Farhan 87'
Penalties
Abu Zema (penalty scored); Al-Shaqran (penalty scored); Al-Sheikh (penalty missed); Sufian (penalty scored)	3 – 1 Iraq went first	(penalty scored) Shneishel; (penalty missed) Fawzi; (penalty missed) Mezher; (penalty missed) Raheem

Amman International Stadium
Attendance: 25,000
Referee: (Egypt) Gamal Al-Ghandour

MATCH OFFICIALS

- Assistant referees:
  - (United Arab Emirates) Younes Hassan
  - (Qatar) Ali Ismail
- Fourth official:
  - (Lebanon) Nabeel Ayaad

== Final ranking ==
Pos	Team	Pld	W	D	L	GF	GA	GD	Pts	Final result
1st place, gold medalist(s)	Jordan (H)	7	5	1	1	18	9	+9	16	Gold Medal
2nd place, silver medalist(s)	Iraq	7	4	1	2	17	9	+8	13	Silver Medal
3rd place, bronze medalist(s)	Libya	6	3	2	1	11	6	+5	11	Bronze Medal
3rd place, bronze medalist(s)	Palestine	6	2	2	2	6	9	−3	8	Bronze Medal
5	Lebanon	5	2	1	2	6	9	−3	7	Eliminated in second stage
6	Syria	4	0	4	0	5	5	0	4	Eliminated in second stage
7	United Arab Emirates	5	1	2	2	5	5	0	5	Eliminated in second stage
8	Oman	4	0	2	2	2	7	−5	2	Eliminated in second stage
9	Saudi Arabia Olympic	2	0	1	1	2	3	−1	1	Eliminated in first stage
10	Qatar Olympic	2	0	0	2	0	4	−4	0	Eliminated in first stage
11	Bahrain Olympic	2	0	0	2	0	6	−6	0	Eliminated in first stage
12	Algeria	0	0	0	0	0	0	0	0	Withdrew

Source: rsssf
(H) Hosts

== Goalscorers ==
8 goals

- (Jordan) Badran Al-Shaqran

6 goals

- (Iraq) Hussam Fawzi
