= Mohammad Nosrati =

Iranian footballer

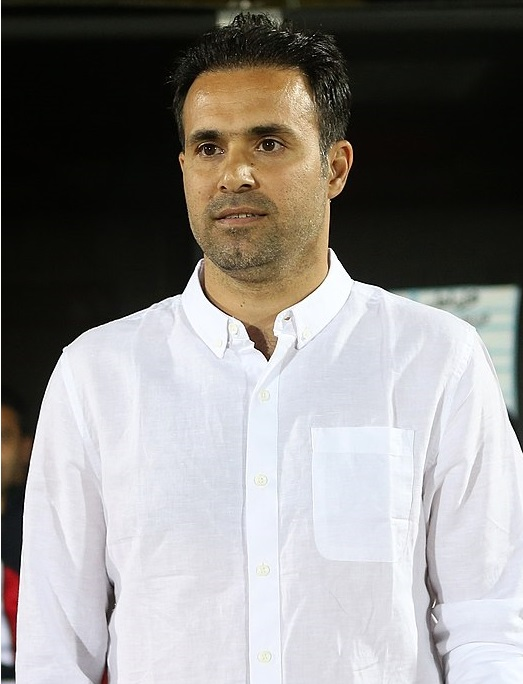
- Mohammad Nosrati in 2019

Personal information
- Full name: Mohammad Nosrati
- Date of birth: 11 January 1982 (age 44)
- Place of birth: Karaj, Iran
- Height: 1.80 m (5 ft 11 in)
- Positions: Centre back; left back

Team information
- Current team: Tractor (assistant manager)

Youth career
- 1997–1998: Persepolis
- 1998–2000: Pas

Senior career*
Years	Team	Apps	(Gls)
2000–2001	Aboomoslem	15	(1)
2001–2007	Pas	116	(8)
2007–2008	Persepolis	30	(1)
2008–2009	Al-Nasr Dubai	22	(1)
2009–2010	Tractor	21	(3)
2010	Al-Nasr	10	(0)
2010–2011	Tractor	33	(5)
2011–2012	Persepolis	18	(1)
2012–2014	Tractor	78	(2)
2014–2015	Paykan	25	(1)
2015–2016	Gostaresh Foolad	17	(0)
2016–2017	Machine Sazi	8	(0)
2017	Gostaresh Foulad	7	(1)
2017–2018	Naft Tehran	18	(1)
2018–2019	Oxin Alborz	10	(0)

International career^{‡}
2002–2004	Iran U23	12	(0)
2002–2013	Iran	81	(5)

Managerial career
- 2019–2020: Gol Reyhan
- 2020–2021: Pars Jonoubi
Medal record
Representing Iran
Asian Games
Gold medal – first place	2002 Busan	Team competition
- * Club domestic league appearances and goals as of 20 February 2015 ‡ National team caps and goals as of 22 May 2013

Mohammad Nosrati (Persian: محمد نصرتى, born 11 January 1982) is an Iranian football coach and former player. He is the current head coach of the Pars Jonoubi Jam team in the Azadegan League. Mohammad Nosrati is a former member of the Iranian national football team and represented his country in the 2006 World Cup. He has played for the club teams Tehran Pass, Persepolis, Al-Nasr, Traktor, Peykan, Gostaresh Foolad, Naft Tehran, and Mashin Sazi. Internationally, Nosrati played for the Iran national football team from 2002 to 2013. He scored a goal against Bahrain in the 2006 AFC qualifiers to earn Iran a spot at the 2006 World Cup. He also won the 2002 Asian Under-23 Games in Busan with Iran.

== Club career ==
=== Pas Tehran ===
Nosrati started his career at Aboomoslem, he left the club to join PAS in 2001. He was one of many valuable players of Pas Tehran, finishing the 2003–04 season as Iran Pro League champions. There had been some notable interest shown in him from outside Iran—most notably he was officially linked to 2003 Croatian champions, Dinamo Zagreb, but rejected the offer citing that he wanted to play in a better European league. He dispelled speculation of which European team he would sign with when he signed a three-year extension with Pas in 2005. He also played in AFC Champions League for Pas. After Pas Tehran was disqualified, Nosrati left the club and did not join the newly formed Pas Hamedan.

=== Persepolis ===
On 9 February 2007 it was said Nosrati signed with Belgian League outfit R.E. Mouscron on a 5-month contract after a successful trial and passing medical tests, however the deal was not completed as terms and conditions could not be agreed on. He moved to Persepolis in August 2007 and won the league in his first and only season.

=== Al-Nasr and Tractor ===
In 2008, he moved to Al-Nasr in the United Arab Emirates and joined Luka Bonačić's team. He played in most of the matches for Al-Nasr but it was reported that he was unhappy in the United Arab Emirates and wanted to move back to Persepolis. He finally joined newly promoted Iran Pro League club Tractor. Nosrati moved back to his old club in the UAE Al-Nasr in late January 2010. He moved back to Tractor in summer of 2010 and stayed there for a season.

=== Persepolis ===
He signed a contract with Persepolis on 27 June 2011. He was indefinitely suspended by the Iranian football federation for "immoral acts" after he squeezed his teammate Sheis Rezaei's buttocks during a goal celebration. His suspension came to end on 26 December 2011. He later became a regular player for the team again but was named in the transfer list after the end of the season and was transferred to his former club Tractor.

=== Tractor ===
At Tractor he was one of the key players of the team which became the runners-up in the league for the first time in the club's history. He also helped the club win the Hazfi Cup in his second season at the club.

=== Paykan ===
On 19 June 2014, Nosrati joined Paykan.

=== Club career statistics ===
As of 7 August 2014

Club performance			League		Cup		Continental		Total	
Season	Club	League	Apps	Goals	Apps	Goals	Apps	Goals	Apps	Goals
Iran			League		Hazfi Cup		Asia		Total	
2000–01	Aboomoslem	Azadegan League	15	1			–			
2001–02	Pas	Pro League	15	1			–			
2002–03	Pas	Pro League	19	1			–			
2003–04	Pas	Pro League	23	0			–			
2004–05	Pas	Pro League	22	0	0	0	8	0	30	0
2005–06	Pas	Pro League	24	4	0	0	–		24	0
2006–07	Pas	Pro League	13	2	0	0	–		13	2
2007–08	Persepolis	Pro League	30	1	3	0	–		33	1
United Arab Emirates			League		President's Cup		Asia		Total	
2008–09	Al Nasr	UAE Football League	22	1	1	0	–		23	1
Iran			League		Hazfi Cup		Asia		Total	
2009–10	Tractor	Pro League	21	3	0	0	–		21	3
United Arab Emirates			League		President's Cup		Asia		Total	
2009–10	Al Nasr	UAE Football League	10	0	0	0	–		10	0
Iran			League		Hazfi Cup		Asia		Total	
2010–11	Tractor	Pro League	32	6	1	0	–		33	6
2011–12	Persepolis	Pro League	18	1	1	0	5	0	24	1
2012–13	Tractor	Pro League	27	1	1	0	6	0	34	1
2013–14	Tractor	Pro League	26	2	4	0	5	0	35	2
2014–15	Paykan	Pro League	26	1	0	0	–	–	26	1
2015–16	Gostaresh	Pro League	17	0	0	0	–	–	17	0
2016–17	Machin Sazi	Pro League	15	1	0	0	–	–	15	1
2017–18	Naft Tehran	Pro League	18	2	0	0	–	–	18	2
Total	Iran		346	28			24	0		
Total	United Arab Emirates		32	1			0	0		
Career total			378	29			24	0		

- Assist Goals

Season	Team	Assists
05–06	Pas Tehran	1
10–11	Tractor	2
11–12	Persepolis	1
12–13	Tractor	0
13–14	Tractor	1
14–15	Paykan	0

== International career ==
Nosrati made his debut for Iran in 2002 in a game against Jordan and since that moment has had a somewhat stable role in the squad. Already labeled a talented youngster before that debut, he has consistently made a balanced and overall good impression. After being one of the Asian Games 2002 gold medal winners, he was marked as a fixed defender in the national team despite being only 20 years old at the time. He was in Iran's squad in 2004 Asian Cup and scored an important goal against Oman in group stages in 92nd minute. He also won the 2004 West Asian Football Federation Championship with Team Melli.

He was among Iran's final squad for World Cup 2006. He also played in 2007 AFC Asian Cup qualification and after a long injury played in 2007 Asian Cup. He played in 2010 FIFA World Cup qualification and 2014 FIFA World Cup qualification for Team Melli. He continued to be one of the regular players in 2011 AFC Asian Cup qualification. He played in West Asian Football Federation Championship 2010 and 2011 Asian Cup.

=== International caps ===
Iran
Year	Apps	Goals
2002	5	0
2003	12	0
2004	13	2
2005	10	1
2006	13	1
2007	3	0
2008	0	0
2009	10	0
2010	7	1
2011	5	0
2012	1	0
2013	2	0
Total	81	5

=== International goals ===
Scores and results list Iran's goal tally first.

#	Date	Venue	Opponent	Score	Result	Competition
1	21 June 2004	Azadi Stadium, Tehran	Syria	4–0	7–1	2004 WAFF
2	24 July 2004	Yanghe Stadium, Chongqing	Oman	2–2	2–2	2004 AFC Asian Cup
3	8 June 2005	Azadi Stadium, Tehran	Bahrain	1–0	1–0	2006 FIFA World Cup qualification
4	6 September 2006	Abbasiyyin, Damascus	Syria	2–0	2–0	2007 AFC Asian Cup qualification
5	11 August 2010	Hrazdan Stadium, Yerevan	Armenia	2–1	3–1	Friendly

== Managerial statistics ==
As of 11 November 2018

Team	From	To	Record							
Team	From	To	G	W	D	L	GF	GA	GD	Win %
Oxin (caretaker)	1 November 2018	25 November 2018	2	1	1	0	3	1	+2	50.00
Total			2	1	1	0	3	1	+2	50.00

== Honours ==
Pas Tehran

- Iran Pro League (1): 2002–03 (Runner-up), 2003–04, 2005–06 (Runner-up)

Persepolis

- Iran Pro League (1): 2007–08

Tractor

- Iran Pro League: 2012–13 (Runner-up)
- Hazfi Cup (1): 2013–14

Country

- Asian Games Gold Medal (1): 2002
- West Asian Football Federation Championship (1): 2004
- AFC/OFC Cup Challenge (1): 2003
