= 2002 Malta International Football Tournament =

Tournament details
- Host country: Malta
- Dates: 9–13 February
- Teams: 4
- Venue(s): 1 (in 1 host city)

Final positions
- Champions: Malta (2nd title)
- Runners-up: Lithuania
- Third place: Jordan
- Fourth place: Moldova

Tournament statistics
- Matches played: 6
- Goals scored: 14 (2.33 per match)
- Attendance: 5,405 (901 per match)
- Top scorer(s): (Malta) George Mallia (Malta) Michael Mifsud (Moldova) Alexandru Golban (2 goals)

The 2002 Malta International Tournament (known as the Rothmans Tournament for sponsorship reasons) was the eleventh edition of the Malta International Tournament. Held between 9 February and 13 February 2002, the tournament was contested by host country Malta, Jordan, Lithuania and Moldova.

== Matches ==
Pos	Team	Pld	W	D	L	GF	GA	GD	Pts
1	Malta (C, H)	3	2	1	0	6	2	+4	7
2	Lithuania	3	1	1	1	2	4	−2	4
3	Jordan	3	1	0	2	4	4	0	3
4	Moldova	3	1	0	2	2	4	−2	3

Source: RSSSF
(C) Champions; (H) Hosts
9 February 2002

Lithuania	1–0	Moldova
Beniušis 33'	Report

National Stadium, Ta' Qali
Attendance: 800
Referee: Joseph Attard (Malta)

9 February 2002

Malta	2–1	Jordan
Mifsud 7'; Brincat 62'	Report	Abu Zema 58' (pen.)

National Stadium, Ta' Qali
Attendance: 784
Referee: Vladimir Antonov (Moldova)

11 February 2002

Malta	1–1	Lithuania
Agius 51'	Report	Dedura 33'

National Stadium, Ta' Qali
Attendance: 1,390
Referee: Ismail Al Hafi (Jordan)

11 February 2002

Moldova	2–0	Jordan
Golban 16', 69'	Report

National Stadium, Ta' Qali
Attendance: 700
Referee: Anton Zammit (Malta)

13 February 2002

Lithuania	0–3	Jordan
	Report	Al-Shaqran 33'; Semrin 47' (pen.); Salim 82'

National Stadium, Ta' Qali
Attendance: 250
Referee: Lawrence Sammut (Malta)

13 February 2002

Malta	3–0	Moldova
Mallia 35', 54'; Mifsud 90'	Report

National Stadium, Ta' Qali
Attendance: 1,481
Referee: Darius Mieželis (Lithuania)

== Winner ==
2002 Malta Tournament winner

Malta
Second title

== Statistics ==
=== Goalscorers ===
There were 14 goals scored in 6 matches, for an average of 2.33 goals per match.

2 goals

- (Malta) George Mallia
- (Malta) Michael Mifsud
- (Moldova) Alexandru Golban

1 goal

- (Jordan) Abdullah Abu Zema
- (Jordan) Badran Al-Shaqran
- (Jordan) Haitham Semrin
- (Jordan) Muyed Salim
- (Lithuania) Ignas Dedura
- (Lithuania) Ričardas Beniušis
- (Malta) Gilbert Agius
- (Malta) Joe Brincat

Source: EU-Football

== See also ==
China Cup
Cyprus International Football Tournament
