= Hassan Abdel-Fattah =

Jordanian footballer (born 1982)

Personal information
- Full name: Hassan Abdel-Fattah Mahmoud Al-Mahsiri
- Date of birth: 17 August 1982 (age 44)
- Place of birth: Riyadh, Saudi Arabia
- Height: 1.80 m (5 ft 11 in)
- Position: Attacking midfielder

Youth career
- Al-Wehdat

Senior career*
| Years | Team | Apps | (Gls) |
| 2000–2014 | Al-Wehdat | 136 | (58) |
| 2009 | → Hatta (loan) | 8 | (2) |
| 2009–2010 | → Al-Karamah (loan) | 20 | (8) |
| 2011 | → Al-Kuwait (loan) | 5 | (0) |
| 2012 | → Al-Khor (loan) | 8 | (3) |
| 2012–2013 | → Al-Khor (loan) | 12 | (2) |
| 2014–2016 | Al-Kharaitiyat | 37 | (20) |
| 2016–2017 | Al-Wehdat | 18 | (7) |
| 2017–2018 | Al-Shamal | 10 | (3) |
| 2018–2019 | Al-Wehdat | 15 | (5) |

International career^{‡}
| 2002-2003 | Jordan U23 | | |
| 2002–2015 | Jordan | 109 | (29) |
- * Club domestic league appearances and goals as of 9 May 2019 ‡ National team caps and goals as of 13 October 2015

Hassan Abdel-Fattah Mahmoud Al-Mahsiri (Arabic: حسن عبد الفتاح محمود المحسيري) is a retired Jordanian footballer.

== International goals ==
Scores and results list Jordan's goal tally first.

| # | Date | Venue | Opponent | Score | Result | Competition |
|---|---|---|---|---|---|---|
| 1 | 26 March 2005 | Larnaca | Cyprus | 2–1 | Loss | Friendly Match |
| 2 | 7 February 2006 | Kuwait City | Kuwait | 2–1 | Loss | Friendly Match |
| 3 | 31 May 2008 | Seoul | South Korea | 2–2 | Draw | 2010 FIFA World Cup qualification |
| 4 | 31 May 2008 | Seoul | South Korea | 2–2 | Draw | 2010 FIFA World Cup qualification |
| 5 | 22 June 2008 | Amman | Turkmenistan | 2–0 | Win | 2010 FIFA World Cup qualification |
| 6 | 22 June 2008 | Amman | Turkmenistan | 2–0 | Win | 2010 FIFA World Cup qualification |
| 7 | 11 August 2008 | Tehran | Oman | 3–1 | Win | 2008 West Asian Football Federation Championship |
| 8 | 28 September 2010 | Amman | Kuwait | 2–2 | Draw | 2010 West Asian Football Federation Championship |
| 9 | 28 September 2010 | Amman | Kuwait | 2–2 | Draw | 2010 West Asian Football Federation Championship |
| 10 | 9 January 2011 | Doha | Japan | 1–1 | Draw | 2011 AFC Asian Cup |
| 11 | 26 March 2011 | Sharjah | Kuwait | 1–1 | Draw | Friendly Match |
| 12 | 29 March 2011 | Sharjah | North Korea | 1–1 | Draw | Friendly Match |
| 13 | 8 July 2011 | Istanbul | Yemen | 4–0 | Win | Friendly Match |
| 14 | 13 July 2011 | Amman | Saudi Arabia | 1–1 (3:4 PSO) | Loss | Friendly Match |
| 15 | 23 July 2011 | Amman | Nepal | 9–0 | Win | 2014 FIFA World Cup qualification |
| 16 | 23 July 2011 | Amman | Nepal | 9–0 | Win | 2014 FIFA World Cup qualification |
| 17 | 23 July 2011 | Amman | Nepal | 9–0 | Win | 2014 FIFA World Cup qualification |
| 18 | 23 July 2011 | Amman | Nepal | 9–0 | Win | 2014 FIFA World Cup qualification |
| 19 | 2 September 2011 | Arbil | Iraq | 2–0 | Win | 2014 FIFA World Cup qualification |
| 20 | 15 November 2011 | Amman | Iraq | 1–3 | Loss | 2014 FIFA World Cup qualification |
| 21 | 15 August 2012 | Amman | Uzbekistan | 2–0 | Win | Friendly Match |
| 22 | 11 September 2012 | Amman | Australia | 2–1 | Win | 2014 FIFA World Cup qualification |
| 23 | 8 October 2012 | Doha | Qatar | 1–1 | Draw | Friendly Match |
| 24 | 6 August 2013 | Amman | Palestine | 4–1 | Win | Friendly Match |
| 25 | 5 June 2015 | Istanbul | Kuwait | 2–2 | Draw | Friendly Match |
| 26 | 11 June 2015 | Dushanbe | Tajikistan | 3–1 | Win | 2018 FIFA World Cup qualification |
| 27 | 11 June 2015 | Dushanbe | Tajikistan | 3–1 | Win | 2018 FIFA World Cup qualification |
| 28 | 11 June 2015 | Dushanbe | Tajikistan | 3–1 | Win | 2018 FIFA World Cup qualification |
| 29 | 8 October 2015 | Amman | Australia | 2–0 | Win | 2018 FIFA World Cup qualification |
| 30 | 13 October 2015 | Amman | Tajikistan | 3–0 | Win | 2018 FIFA World Cup qualification |

== Participation in International Tournaments ==
=== In AFC Asian Cups ===
- 2004 Asian Cup
- 2011 Asian Cup

=== In WAFF Championships ===
- 2004 WAFF Championship
- 2007 WAFF Championship
- 2008 WAFF Championship
- 2010 WAFF Championship
