= Badran Al-Shaqran =

Jordanian footballer (born 1974)

Personal information
- Full name: Badran Mohammad Al-Shaqran
- Date of birth: 19 January 1974 (age 52)
- Place of birth: Al-Ramtha, Jordan
- Height: 1.80 m (5 ft 11 in)
- Position: Striker

Youth career
- Al-Ramtha

Senior career*
Years	Team	Apps	(Gls)
1989–1995	Al-Ramtha		
1995–1997	KAMAZ-Chally Naberezhnye Chelny		
1997–2002	Al-Ramtha		
2002–2006	Al-Muharraq		
2006–2008	Al-Ramtha		
2008	Al-Wathba		
2009	Ittihad Al-Ramtha		

International career^{‡}
1996–2006	Jordan	61	(27)
- * Club domestic league appearances and goals ‡ National team caps and goals as of 8 November 2026

Badran Mohammad Al-Shaqran (Arabic: بدران محمد الشقران; born 19 January 1974) is a Jordanian former professional footballer.

== Retirement ==
On 13 July 2011 Jordan played an international friendly match against Saudi Arabia to mark Badran's retirement in playing football. After playing the first 5 minutes of the match Badran gave the captain armband to his teammate Bashar Bani Yaseen as well as his #20 jersey shirt to his younger teammate from Al-Ramtha Hamza Al-Dardour.

== Honors and Participation in International Tournaments ==
=== In AFC Asian Cups ===
- 2004 Asian Cup

=== In Pan Arab Games ===
- 1999 Pan Arab Games

=== In Arab Nations Cup ===
- 1998 Arab Nations Cup
- 2002 Arab Nations Cup

=== In WAFF Championships ===
- 2000 WAFF Championship
- 2002 WAFF Championship
- 2004 WAFF Championship

== International goals ==
#	Date	Venue	Opponent	Score	Result	Competition	Ref.
1	19 April 1997	Sharjah Stadium, Sharjah, United Arab Emirates	Bahrain	2–0	4–1	1998 FIFA World Cup qualification	
2	23 July 1998	Beirut	Lebanon		2–0	1998 Arab Nations Cup qualification	
3	22 June 1999	Prince Mohammed bin Abdullah Al Faisal Stadium, Riyadh, Saudi Arabia	Saudi Arabia		1–2	Friendly	
4	18 July 1999	Amman	Syria		4–0	Friendly	
5	18 July 1999	Amman	Syria		4–0	Friendly	
6	16 August 1999	Amman International Stadium, Amman, Jordan	Qatar	2–0	3–0	1999 Pan Arab Games	
7	23 August 1999	Amman International Stadium, Amman, Jordan	Lebanon	1–3	1–3	1999 Pan Arab Games	
8	25 August 1999	Amman International Stadium, Amman, Jordan	Iraq	2–1	2–1	1999 Pan Arab Games	
10	29 August 1999	Amman International Stadium, Amman, Jordan	Palestine	1–0	4–1	1999 Pan Arab Games	
11	29 August 1999	Amman International Stadium, Amman, Jordan	Palestine	3–0	4–1	1999 Pan Arab Games	
12	29 August 1999	Amman International Stadium, Amman, Jordan	Palestine	4–0	4–1	1999 Pan Arab Games	
13	31 August 1999	Amman International Stadium, Amman, Jordan	Iraq	2–0	4–4	1999 Pan Arab Games	
14	31 August 1999	Amman International Stadium, Amman, Jordan	Iraq	4–0	4–4	1999 Pan Arab Games	
15	6 April 2000	Doha	Pakistan	1–0	5–0	2000 AFC Asian Cup qualification	
16	23 May 2000	King Abdullah II Stadium, Amman, Jordan	Kyrgyzstan	1–0	2–0	2000 West Asian Football Federation Championship	
17	16 January 2001	Fatorda Stadium, Goa, India	Hong Kong		2–0	Friendly	
18	28 January 2001	Zarqa	North Korea		1–0	Friendly	
19	27 April 2001	Pakhtakor Central Stadium, Tashkent, Uzbekistan	Uzbekistan		2–2	2002 FIFA World Cup qualification	
20	3 May 2001	Amman	Chinese Taipei		6–0	2002 FIFA World Cup qualification	
21	13 February 2002	National Stadium, Ta' Qali, Malta	Lithuania		3–0	Friendly	
22	26 September 2003	Al-Hassan Stadium, Irbid, Jordan	Iran		3–2	2004 AFC Asian Cup qualification	
23	12 November 2003	Beirut	Lebanon		2–0	2004 AFC Asian Cup qualification	
24	18 February 2004	Amman	Laos		5–0	2006 FIFA World Cup qualification	
25	25 June 2004	Tehran	Iraq		3–1	2004 West Asian Football Federation Championship	
26	25 June 2004	Tehran	Iraq		3–1	2004 West Asian Football Federation Championship	
27	21 August 2004	Amman	Lebanon		2–2	Friendly	
28	13 October 2004	Vientiane	Laos		3–2	2006 FIFA World Cup qualification	
29	13 October 2004	Vientiane	Laos		3–2	2006 FIFA World Cup qualification	
30	22 February 2006	Amman	Pakistan		3–0	2007 AFC Asian Cup qualification	
