= 2004 LG Cup (Nigeria) =

2004 LG Cup Four Nations Tournament
Tournament details
- Host country: Nigeria
- City: Lagos
- Dates: 28–30 April
- Teams: 4
- Venue(s): 1 (in 1 host city)

Final positions
- Champions: Senegal (1st title)
- Runners-up: Nigeria
- Third place: Libya
- Fourth place: Jordan

Tournament statistics
- Matches played: 4
- Goals scored: 5 (1.25 per match)
- Top scorer(s): 5 players (1 goal)

The LG Cup Four Nations is an exhibition association football tournament that took place in National Stadium, Lagos, Nigeria in April 2004.

== Participants ==
The participants were:

- Libya
- Nigeria (Participated only using their home-based players.)
- Jordan
- Senegal U-23

== Results ==
=== Semifinals ===
28 April 2004

Senegal U-23	1–0	Libya
Traoré 83'	Report

National Stadium, Lagos

28 April 2004

Nigeria	2–0	Jordan
Akwueme 16'; Nworgu 82'	Report

National Stadium, Lagos

=== Third place match ===
30 April 2004

Libya	1–0	Jordan
Rewane 37'	Report

National Stadium, Lagos

=== Final ===
30 April 2004

Nigeria	0–1	Senegal U-23
	Report	Sankaré 25'

National Stadium, Lagos

2004 LG Cup (Nigeria)

Senegal
First title

== Scorers ==
1 goal

- (Senegal) U-23 Mouhamadou Traoré
- (Senegal) U-23 Khalifa Sankaré
- (Libya) Salem Rewane
- (Nigeria) Emeka Akwueme
- (Nigeria) Chukwudi Nworgu
