= 2004 LG Cup (Libya) =

2004 LG Cup Four Nations Tournament
Tournament details
- Host country: Libya
- City: Tripoli
- Dates: 20–22 October
- Teams: 4
- Venue(s): (in 1 host city)

Final positions
- Champions: Libya (1st title)
- Runners-up: Jordan
- Third place: Ecuador
- Fourth place: Nigeria

Tournament statistics
- Matches played: 4
- Goals scored: 11 (2.75 per match)
- Top scorer(s): (Libya) Nader Kara (3 goals)

The 2004 Libya LG Cup was an exhibition association football tournament that took place in Libya. The hosts won the tournament after beating Jordan 1–0 in the final with a goal from Nader Kara.

== Participants ==
The participants were:

- Libya
- Nigeria
- Jordan
- Ecuador

== Results ==
=== Semifinals ===
20 October 2004

Libya	2–1	Nigeria
Kara 23', 44'	Report	Ejezi 17'

Tripoli Stadium, Tripoli

20 October 2004

Jordan	3–0	Ecuador
Saad 53'; Shelbaieh 56', 77'	Report

Tripoli Stadium, Tripoli

=== Third place match ===
22 October 2004

Ecuador	2–2	Nigeria
Ayoví ?' (pen.); Porozo ?'	Report	Ejezi ?'; Ademola 78'
Penalties
	4–3

Tripoli Stadium, Tripoli

=== Final ===
22 October 2004

Libya	1–0	Jordan
Kara 59' (pen.)	Report

Tripoli Stadium, Tripoli
Attendance: 60,000

2004 LG Cup (Libya) winner

Libya
First title

== Statistics ==
=== Goalscorers ===
There were 11 goals scored in 4 matches, for an average of 2.75 goals per match.

3 goals

- (Libya) Nader Kara

2 goals

- (Jordan) Mahmoud Shelbaieh
- (Nigeria) Victor Ejezi

1 goal

- (Ecuador) Marlon Ayoví
- (Jordan) Khaled Saad
- (Nigeria) Augusto Porozo
- (Nigeria) Kola Ademola

== See also ==
- LG Cup
