= LG Cup (association football) =

International football tournament

The LG Cup is an international exhibition association football tournament organised by LG Electronics, a South Korean company. LG describe the competition as a "social marketing experiment". Iran has hosted the most number of times in this international tournament, which was held from 1997 to 2011, with five times.

The inaugural competition took place in 1997 in Tunis, Tunisia.

== Editions ==
Edition	Year	Host	Participants	Venue(s)	Winner
1	1997; Details	Tunisia	Tunisia; Nigeria; Zambia; Cameroon	El Menzah Stadium (Tunis)	Tunisia
2	1998; Details	Iran	Iran; Jamaica; Hungary; Macedonia	Azadi Stadium (Tehran)	Hungary
3	1999; Details	Morocco	Morocco; France; Cameroon; Guinea	Stade Mohammed V (Casablanca)	France
4	2000; Details	Iran	Iran; South Korea; Egypt; Macedonia	Azadi Stadium (Tehran)	South Korea
5	2000; Details	United Arab Emirates	United Arab Emirates; South Korea; Australia; Kuwait	Al-Maktoum Stadium (Dubai)	United Arab Emirates
6	2001; Details	Egypt	Egypt; South Korea; Iran; Canada	Cairo International Stadium (Cairo)	South Korea
7	2001; Details	Iran	Iran; South Africa; Oman; Bosnia and Herzegovina	Azadi Stadium (Tehran)	Iran
8	2002; Details	Russia	Russia; Belarus; Ukraine; FR Yugoslavia	Central Dynamo Stadium	Belarus
9	2002; Details	Vietnam	Singapore (U23); India (U23); Vietnam (U23); Vietnam; Thailand (U20); (Indonesia) Petrokimia Putra	Thống Nhất Stadium (Vietnam)	India (U23)
10	2002; Details	Morocco	Morocco; Algeria; Iran; Venezuela	Stade Mohammed V (Casablanca)	Iran
11	2002; Details	Iran	Iran; Paraguay; Morocco; South Africa	Takhti Stadium (Tabriz)	Iran
12	2003; Details	Nigeria	Nigeria; Cameroon; Iran; Ghana	National Stadium Abuja & National Stadium Lagos	Nigeria
13	2003; Details	Iran	Iran; Uruguay; Cameroon; Iraq	Azadi Stadium (Tehran)	Uruguay
14	2004; Details	Nigeria	Nigeria; Senegal (U23); Libya; Jordan	National Stadium in Lagos (Lagos)	Senegal (U23)
15	2004; Details	Libya	Libya; Ecuador; Jordan; Nigeria	June 11 Stadium (Tripoli)	Libya
16	2005; Details	Egypt	Egypt; Senegal; Ecuador; Uganda	Cairo International Stadium (Cairo)	Egypt
17	2006; Details	Saudi Arabia	South Korea; Greece; Saudi Arabia; Finland	Prince Faisal Fahad Stadium	South Korea
18	2006; Details	Tunisia	Tunisia; Uruguay; Belarus; Libya	National Stadium "7 November Rades" (Tunis)	Uruguay
19	2011; Details	Kenya	Kenya; Sudan	Nyayo National Stadium (Nairobi)	Sudan
20	2011; Details	Morocco	Cameroon; Morocco; Sudan; Uganda	Marrakesh Stadium (Marrakesh)	Cameroon

== Most successful national teams ==
Team	Champions
Iran	3
South Korea	3
Uruguay	2
Egypt	2
France	1
Tunisia	1
Hungary	1
United Arab Emirates	1
Belarus	1
India (U23)	1
Nigeria	1
Senegal (U23)	1
Libya	1
Sudan	1
Cameroon	1
