= Qusai Abu Alieh =

Jordanian footballer

Personal information
- Date of birth: 20 December 1978 (age 47)
- Place of birth: Amman, Jordan
- Height: 1.70 m (5 ft 7 in)
- Position: Midfielder

Senior career*
Years	Team	Apps	(Gls)
1996–2014	Al-Faisaly		
2011–2012	Al-Jazeera		
2012–2013	Al-Yarmouk		
2013–2014	Al-Faisaly		

International career
2003–2010	Jordan	84	(1)
- * Club domestic league appearances and goals

Qusai Abu Alieh is a Jordanian footballer who played as a midfielder for Al-Faisaly (Amman) and the Jordan national football team.

== International career ==
Qusai's last international match was against Singapore on 3 March 2010 in the 2011 Asian Cup qualifying which Jordan won 2-1. He played in the last few minutes of the match after entering as a substitute for his teammate Odai Al-Saify.

== Honors and Participation in International Tournaments ==
=== In AFC Asian Cups ===
- 2004 Asian Cup

=== In WAFF Championships ===
- 2004 WAFF Championship
- 2007 WAFF Championship
- 2008 WAFF Championship

== International goals ==
#	Date	Venue	Opponent	Score	Result	Competition
1	June 25, 2004	Tehran	Iraq	3-1	Win	2004 West Asian Football Federation Championship
