= Awad Ragheb =

Jordanian footballer

Personal information
- Full name: Awad Ragheb Deeb
- Date of birth: 19 May 1982 (age 44)
- Place of birth: Amman, Jordan
- Height: 1.72 m (5 ft 8 in)
- Position: Striker

Senior career*
Years	Team	Apps	(Gls)
1998–2010	Al-Wehdat		
2008	Riffa		(7)
2011	Hutteen		(1)
2011–2012	Shabab Al-Ordon		
2012	Al-Jazeera		
2012–2013	Al-Yarmouk		
2013	Al-Sareeh		

International career
2002-2003	Jordan U23		
2000–2008	Jordan	19	(6)
- * Club domestic league appearances and goals

Awad Ragheb Deeb (born 19 May 1982) is a retired Jordanian footballer.

== Honors and Participation in International Tournaments ==
=== In AFC Asian Cups ===
- 2004 Asian Cup

=== In WAFF Championships ===
- 2004 WAFF Championship
- 2007 WAFF Championship

== International goals ==
=== With U-23 ===
#	Date	Venue	Opponent	Score	Result	Competition
	19 April 2003	Amman	Lebanon	1-1	Draw	Football at the 2004 Summer Olympics – Men's Asian Qualifiers

=== With Men's Team ===
#	Date	Venue	Opponent	Score	Result	Competition
1	18 February 2004	Amman	Laos	5-0	Win	2006 FIFA World Cup qualification
2	8 June 2007	Amman	Iraq	1-1	Draw	Friendly
3	20 June 2007	Amman	Lebanon	3-0	Win	2007 West Asian Football Federation Championship
4	7 September 2007	Muharraq	Bahrain	3-1	Win	Friendly (2 goals)
5	28 January 2008	Amman	Lebanon	4-1	Win	Friendly
6	31 January 2008	Zarqa	Singapore	2-1	Win	Friendly
