= 1999 LG Cup (Morocco) =

1999 Third LG Cup Four Nations Tournament
Tournament details
- Host country: Morocco
- City: Casablanca
- Dates: 11–13 May
- Teams: 4
- Venue: (in 1 host city)

Final positions
- Champions: France (1st title)
- Runners-up: Morocco
- Third place: Cameroon
- Fourth place: Guinea

Tournament statistics
- Matches played: 4
- Goals scored: 10 (2.5 per match)

The third LG Cup is an exhibition association football tournament that took place in Morocco. This edition of LG cup involved Olympic teams.

== Participants ==
The participants were:

- Morocco Olympic
- France
- Cameroon
- Guinea

== Results ==
=== Semifinals ===
11 May 1999

Morocco Olympic	2–1	Guinea

Casablanca

11 May 1999

France	1–0	Cameroon

Casablanca

=== Third place match ===
13 May 1999

Cameroon	4–1	Guinea

Casablanca

=== Final ===
13 May 1999

Morocco Olympic	0–1	France

Casablanca

1999 LG Cup (Morocco) winner

France
First title
