= Hassouneh Al-Sheikh =

Jordanian footballer (born 1977)

Personal information
- Full name: Hassouneh Yousef Qasem Al-Sheikh
- Date of birth: 26 January 1977 (age 49)
- Place of birth: Amman, Jordan
- Height: 1.78 m (5 ft 10 in)
- Position: Attacking midfielder

Youth career
- 1995–1996: Shabab Al-Hussein

Senior career*
Years	Team	Apps	(Gls)
1996–2014	Al-Faisaly		
2004–2007	Al-Riffa		(12)
2008	Al-Busaiteen		(5)
2009	Dubai		
2010–2011	Al-Jaish		(0)
2014	Saham		(0)

International career
1997–2010	Jordan	127	(11)
- * Club domestic league appearances and goals

Hassouneh Yousef Qasem Al-Sheikh (Arabic: حسونة يوسف قاسم الشيخ; born 26 January 1977) is a Jordanian retired footballer.

== Retirement ==
Hassouneh retired internationally after playing the match between Jordan and Kuwait in the 2010 WAFF Championship, in which he entered as a substitute for his teammate Ahmad Abdel-Halim. The match ended in a 2–2 draw.

Hassouneh retired from playing football entirely in 2014. A friendly match was played between Hassouneh's team Al-Faisaly and Zamalek SC at the Amman International Stadium on 3 September 2017, which resulted in a 2–2 draw.

== Honors and participation in international tournaments ==
=== In AFC Asian Cups ===
- 2004 Asian Cup

=== In Pan Arab Games ===
- 1997 Pan Arab Games
- 1999 Pan Arab Games

=== In Arab Nations Cup ===
- 1998 Arab Nations Cup
- 2002 Arab Nations Cup

=== In WAFF Championships ===
- 2000 WAFF Championship
- 2002 WAFF Championship
- 2004 WAFF Championship
- 2007 WAFF Championship
- 2008 WAFF Championship
- 2010 WAFF Championship

== Career statistics ==
=== International goals ===
#	Date	Venue	Opponent	Score	Result	Competition
1	19 April 1997	Sharjah	Bahrain	4–1	Win	1998 FIFA World Cup qualification
2	24 September 1998	Doha	Libya	2–1	Win	1998 Arab Nations Cup
3	16 August 1999	Amman	Qatar	3–0	Win	1999 Pan Arab Games
4	6 April 2000	Doha	Pakistan	5–0	Win	2000 AFC Asian Cup qualification
5	2000	Limassol	Lebanon	1–1	Draw	Friendly
6	7 December 2002	Manama	Bahrain	3–0	Win	Friendly
7	12 November 2003	Beirut	Lebanon	2–0	Win	2004 AFC Asian Cup qualification
8	12 February 2004	Amman	Indonesia	2–1	Win	Friendly
9	8 November 2006	Riyadh	Saudi Arabia	2–1	Loss	Friendly
10	15 November 2006	Amman	Oman	3–0	Win	2007 AFC Asian Cup qualification
11	13 August 2008	Tehran	Qatar	3–0	Win	2008 West Asian Football Federation Championship
12	16 September 2010	Amman	Iraq	4–1	Win	Friendly

== See also ==
- List of men's footballers with 100 or more international caps
