= Bashar Bani Yaseen =

Jordanian footballer

Personal information
- Full name: Bashar Mustafa Bani Yaseen
- Date of birth: 1 June 1977 (age 49)
- Place of birth: Irbid, Jordan
- Height: 1.76 m (5 ft 9 in)
- Position: Defender

Senior career*
Years	Team	Apps	(Gls)
1997–2006	Al-Hussein		
2006	→ Al-Muharraq (loan)		
2006–2011	Al-Jazeera		
2009–2010	→ Al-Hazm (loan)		
2011	→ Al-Muharraq (loan)		
2011–2012	Al-Wehdat		
2012–2014	Al-Arabi		
2014–2015	Sur		

International career
1999–2012	Jordan	121	(2)
- * Club domestic league appearances and goals

Bashar Mustafa Bani Yaseen (Arabic: بشار مصطفى بني ياسين; born 1 June 1977) is a retired Jordanian footballer who currently coaches the Jordanian club Al-Hussein (Irbid).

== International goals ==
#	Date	Venue	Opponent	Score	Result	Competition
1	January 21, 2011	Doha	Uzbekistan	2-1	Loss	2011 AFC Asian Cup

== Honors and Participation in International Tournaments ==
=== In AFC Asian Cups ===
- 2004 Asian Cup
- 2011 Asian Cup

=== In Pan Arab Games ===
- 1999 Pan Arab Games

=== In Arab Nations Cup ===
- 2002 Arab Nations Cup

=== In WAFF Championships ===
- 2000 WAFF Championship
- 2002 WAFF Championship
- 2004 WAFF Championship
- 2007 WAFF Championship
- 2008 WAFF Championship

== See also ==
- List of men's footballers with 100 or more international caps
