= Hatem Aqel =

Jordanian footballer

Personal information
- Full name: Hatem Mohammad Yusuf Aqel
- Date of birth: 20 June 1978 (age 48)
- Place of birth: Amman, Jordan
- Height: 1.85 m (6 ft 1 in)
- Position: Center back

Senior career*
Years	Team	Apps	(Gls)
1997–2012	Al-Faisaly		
2009–2011	→ Al-Raed (loan)	28	(0)
2012	Al-Arabi		(1)
2012–2013	Al-Faisaly		
2013–2017	That Ras		

International career
1998–2014	Jordan	137	(10)
- * Club domestic league appearances and goals

Hatem Mohammad Yousef Aqel (Arabic: حاتم محمد يوسف عقل) is a Jordanian retired footballer.

== International goals ==
#	Date	Venue	Opponent	Score	Result	Competition
1	16 December 2002	Kuwait	Palestine	1-1	Draw	2002 Arab Nations Cup
2	17 October 2003	Amman	Lebanon	1-0	Win	2004 AFC Asian Cup qualification
3	18 February 2004	Amman	Laos	5-0	Win	2006 FIFA World Cup qualification
4	18 August 2004	Amman	Azerbaijan	1-1	Draw	Friendly
5	14 February 2006	Amman	Kazakhstan	2-0	Win	Friendly
6	22 February 2006	Amman	Pakistan	3-0	Win	2007 AFC Asian Cup qualification
7	28 January 2009	Singapore	Singapore	2-1	Loss	2011 AFC Asian Cup qualification
8	9 September 2009	Amman	New Zealand	1-3	Loss	Friendly
9	28 October 2013	Amman	Nigeria	1-0	Win	Friendly

== Honors and Participation in International Tournaments ==
=== In AFC Asian Cups ===
- 2004 Asian Cup
- 2011 Asian Cup

=== In Arab Nations Cup ===
- 2002 Arab Nations Cup

=== In Pan Arab Games ===
- 1999 Pan Arab Games

=== In WAFF Championships ===
- 2000 WAFF Championship
- 2002 WAFF Championship
- 2004 WAFF Championship
- 2007 WAFF Championship
- 2008 WAFF Championship
- 2014 WAFF Championship

== See also ==
- List of men's footballers with 100 or more international caps
