= Anas Al-Zboun =

Jordanian footballer

Personal information
- Date of birth: April 5, 1979 (age 47)
- Place of birth: Irbid, Jordan
- Height: 1.69 m (5 ft 7 in)
- Position: Right winger

Senior career*
Years	Team	Apps	(Gls)
1997–2010	Al-Hussein (Irbid)		
2010–2011	Al-Arabi (Irbid)		
2011	Al-Jalil (Irbid)		
2012–2013	Manshia Bani Hassan		
2013–2014	Al-Sheikh Hussein FC		

International career
2002–2006	Jordan	54	(9)
- * Club domestic league appearances and goals

Anas Al-Zboun is a retired Jordanian footballer.

== Honors and Participation in International Tournaments ==
=== In AFC Asian Cups ===
- 2004 Asian Cup

=== In Arab Nations Cup ===
- 2002 Arab Nations Cup

=== In WAFF Championships ===
- 2002 WAFF Championship
- 2004 WAFF Championship

== International goals ==
#	Date	Venue	Opponent	Score	Result	Competition
1	September 5, 2002	Damascus	Syria	2–1 (a.e.t.)	Win	2002 West Asian Football Federation Championship
2	December 7, 2002	Manama	Bahrain	3-0	Win	Friendly
3	December 12, 2002	Manama	Syria	3-0	Win	Friendly
4	December 23, 2002	Kuwait City	Kuwait	2-1	Win	2002 Arab Nations Cup (2 Goals)
5	December 28, 2002	Kuwait City	Bahrain	2-1	Loss	2002 Arab Nations Cup
6	November 18, 2003	Amman	North Korea	3-0	Win	2004 AFC Asian Cup qualification
7	March 23, 2004	Muharraq	Bahrain	2-0	Win	Friendly
8	July 23, 2004	Jinan	Kuwait	2-0	Win	2004 AFC Asian Cup
