= Ghanem Hamarsheh =

Jordanian footballer

Personal information
- Date of birth: January 1, 1977 (age 49)
- Place of birth: Amman, Jordan
- Position: Forward

Senior career*
| Years | Team | Apps | (Gls) |
| 1996–2010 | Shabab Al-Hussein | | |
| 2002–2003 | → Al-Hussein (loan) | | |
| 2005–2006 | → Al-Busaiteen (loan) | | (2) |
| 2009–2010 | → Al-Jazeera (loan) | | |

International career
| 1999–2001 | Jordan | 38 | (7) |

Managerial career
- 2012–2013: Shabab Al-Hussein (assistant manager)
- 2014: Shabab Al-Ordon (assistant manager)
- * Club domestic league appearances and goals

Ghanem Hamarsheh (born January 1, 1977) is a Jordanian retired footballer.

== International goals ==
| # | Date | Venue | Opponent | Score | Result | Competition |
|---|---|---|---|---|---|---|
| 1 | August 16, 1999 | Amman | Qatar | 3-0 | Win | Football at the 1999 Arab Games |
| 2 | August 25, 1999 | Amman | Iraq | 2-1 | Win | Football at the 1999 Arab Games |
| 3 | April 6, 2000 | Doha | Pakistan | 5–0 | Win | 2000 AFC Asian Cup qualification (2 goals) |
| 4 | 2000 | Lattakia | Bahrain | 2-0 | Win | Friendly |
| 5 | May 3, 2001 | Amman | Chinese Taipei | 6-0 | Win | 2002 FIFA World Cup qualification (2 goals) |
