= Mouhamadou Traoré =

Senegalese footballer

Personal information
- Full name: Mouhamadou Traoré
- Date of birth: 16 April 1982/1986 (age 40–44)
- Place of birth: Thiès, Senegal
- Height: 1.83 m (6 ft 0 in)
- Position: Striker

Senior career*
Years	Team	Apps	(Gls)
2001–2002	US Rail		
2002–2005	ASC Jaraaf		
2006–2008	CSS Richard-Toll		
2008–2009	Glinik Gorlice	15	(9)
2009	→ GKP Gorzów Wielkopolski (loan)	19	(12)
2009–2012	Zagłębie Lubin	49	(9)
2012–2013	Pogoń Szczecin	9	(1)
2013	→ GKS Bełchatów (loan)	9	(0)
2014–2015	Sandecja Nowy Sącz	29	(5)
2015	Siarka Tarnobrzeg	10	(2)
2017	Pogoń Wronin		
- * Club domestic league appearances and goals

Mouhamadou Traoré (born 16 April 1982 or 1986) is a Senegalese former professional footballer who played as a striker.

Sources disagree on his birth date and age:

- 16 April 1982 (44 years old)
- 16 April 1986 (40 years old)
