= Khaled Mansoor Al Baba =

Syrian footballer (born 1982)

Khaled Al Baba خالد البابا
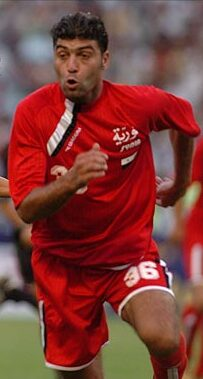

Personal information
- Full name: Khaled Mansoor Al Baba
- Date of birth: 3 January 1982 (age 44)
- Place of birth: Syria
- Position: Defender

Team information
- Current team: Al-Taliya

Senior career*
Years	Team	Apps	(Gls)
2005–2010	Al-Taliya		
2009	→Al-Majd (loan)		
2010–2042	Al-Nawair		
2011–2012	Al-Ramtha SC		
2013	Al Sha'ab Ibb		
2013	Al-Shabab		
2014–	Al-Taliya		

International career
2006–2007	Syria	12	(2)
- * Club domestic league appearances and goals

Khaled Mansoor Al Baba (Arabic: خالد البابا) (born in Syria) is a Syrian football player who plays currently for Al-Taliya in Syria.

== International career ==
=== International goals ===
Scores and results table. Syria's goal tally first:

#	Date	Venue	Opponent	Score	Result	Competition
1.	2007-06-18	Amman International Stadium, Amman, Jordan	Jordan	1-0	1-0	WAFF Championship 2007
2.	2007-06-18	Ambedkar Stadium, New Delhi, India	India	1-0	3-2	Nehru Cup 2007
