= Alexandru Golban =

Moldovan footballer (born 1979)

Personal information
- Date of birth: 28 February 1979 (age 47)
- Place of birth: Chişinău, Moldavian SSR, Soviet Union
- Height: 1.89 m (6 ft 2 in)
- Position: Forward

Youth career
- Speranţa Nisporeni

Senior career*
Years	Team	Apps	(Gls)
2000–2003	Dacia Chișinău	75	(41)
2004–2006	Karpaty Lviv	47	(7)
2004	→ Halychyna-Karpaty Lviv	1	(0)
2007	Eintracht Braunschweig	6	(0)
2007	Ceahlăul Piatra Neamţ	14	(3)
2008–2010	FC Tobol	30	(15)
2010	Simurq Zagatala	15	(2)
2010–2012	FC Milsami	46	(12)
2012	FC Veris	0	(0)
2012	Speranța Crihana Veche	4	(0)

International career
2002–2011	Moldova	15	(4)
- * Club domestic league appearances and goals

Alexandru Golban (born 28 February 1979) is a former professional footballer who played as a forward. He represented the Moldova national team internationally.

== Club career ==
Golban was born in Chișinău, Moldavian SSR, Soviet Union. At club level, he was known in 2001–02 season where he received his first national call-up. In February 2004, he left Moldova to Ukrainian side Karpaty Lviv, signing a three-year contract. He played for the club in two First League seasons, and two Premier League half-seasons, where he just played four times in Ukrainian Premier League. After receiving the Romanian nationality, he moved to German 2. Bundesliga side Eintracht Braunschweig. After the club relegated to the Regionalliga in summer 2007, he moved to Romanian side Ceahlăul Piatra Neamţ and in mid-season to Kazakhstani side FC Tobol.

== International career ==
Golban has made 15 appearances for Moldova, and he played in UEFA Euro 2004 qualifying and 2006 FIFA World Cup qualifying.

== Personal life ==
Golban holds dual Moldovan-Romanian nationality.

== Career statistics ==
#	Date	Venue	Opponent	Score	Result	Competition
1.	11 February 2002	Ta' Qali Stadium, Attard, Malta	Jordan	2–0	Won	Rothmans Tournament
2.	11 February 2002	Ta' Qali Stadium, Attard, Malta	Jordan	2–0	Won	Rothmans Tournament
3.	12 February 2003	Lokomotivi Stadium, Tbilisi, Georgia	Georgia	2–2	Drew	Friendly
4.	20 November 2003	Stade Alphonse Theis, Hesperange, Luxembourg	Luxembourg	1–2	Won	Friendly
Correct as of 7 October 2015
