= WAFF Championship =

Football tournament for men's national teams

- Organiser(s): WAFF
- Founded: 2000; 26 years ago
- Region: West Asia
- Teams: 12 (2026)
- Current champions: Bahrain (1st title)
- Most championships: Iran (4 titles)
- Website: the-waff.com
- 2026 WAFF Championship

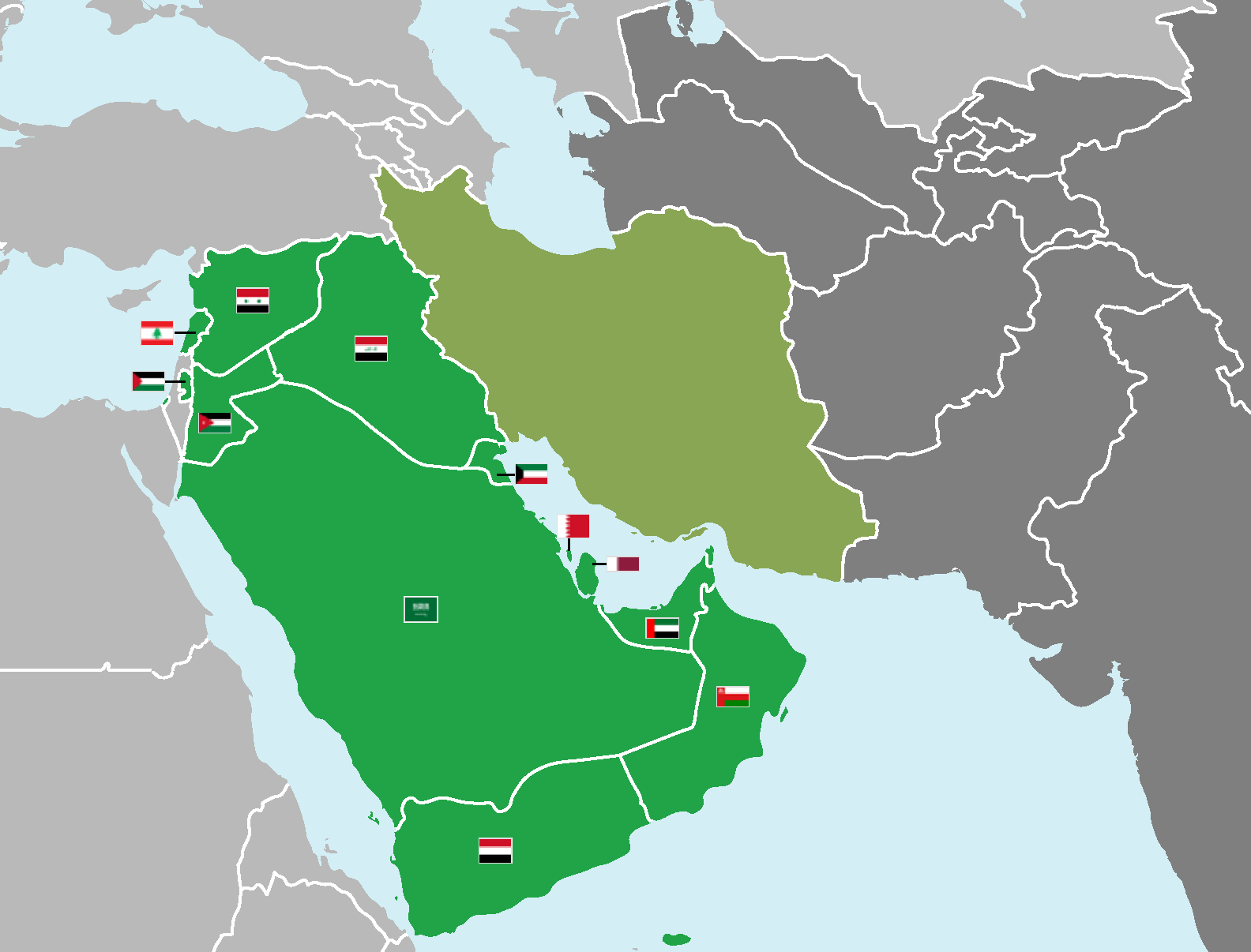
Members of the WAFF

The West Asian Football Federation Championship (Arabic: بطولة اتحاد غرب آسيا لكرة القدم), or simply WAFF Championship, is an international association football competition contested by the senior men's national teams of the members of the West Asian Football Federation (WAFF), the governing body of football in West Asia.

The competition was first held in 2000, with Iran winning the inaugural tournament. The most recent edition was held in 2019, with Bahrain winning their first title after defeating Iraq in the final.

== History ==
The inaugural WAFF Championship was held in Amman, Jordan, from 23 May to 3 June 2000. The tournament, also known as the King Hussein Cup, featured the six WAFF members at the time alongside invited teams Kazakhstan and Kyrgyzstan. Iran defeated Syria 1–0 in the final to win the inaugural title. The tournament was dedicated to the memory of Hussein of Jordan, who had died the previous year, and the trophy was named the Al Hussein Cup.

The 2002 edition was held in Damascus, Syria, with all matches played at the Abbasiyyin Stadium. Iraq won their first title after recovering from two goals down to defeat Jordan 3–2 after extra time in the final. The 2004 edition was held in Tehran, Iran, and was won by the hosts, who defeated Syria 4–1 in the final. Iran had earlier defeated Syria 7–1 in the group stage, while Ali Daei scored five goals during the tournament.

The fourth edition was originally scheduled to be held in Lebanon in 2006 but was postponed following the 2006 Lebanon War and subsequently moved to Jordan. Qatar and the United Arab Emirates withdrew after the postponement. Iran won the tournament, defeating Iraq 2–1 in the final to claim their third title. The 2008 edition was held in Tehran and featured only four WAFF members after Iraq and Bahrain withdrew. Oman and Qatar, which were not WAFF members at the time, participated as invited teams. Iran defeated Jordan 2–1 in the final to retain the title.

The 2010 edition was originally assigned to Lebanon but was transferred to Jordan. Kuwait won their first title after defeating three-time defending champions Iran 2–1 in the final. The 2012 edition was held in Kuwait and was won by Syria for the first time, who defeated Iraq 1–0 in the final. The 2013 edition was hosted by Qatar from 25 December 2013 to 7 January 2014. Qatar won their first title after defeating Jordan 2–0 in the final. The defending champions, Syria, did not participate, while Yemen withdrew shortly before the tournament.

The 2019 edition was the first to be hosted by Iraq. Nine teams participated, with Bahrain defeating the hosts 1–0 in the final at Karbala International Stadium to win their first WAFF Championship title.

== Results ==
Edition	Year	Hosts	Champions	Score	Runners-up	Third place	Score	Fourth place	No. of Teams
1	2000	Jordan	Iran	1–0	Syria	Iraq	4–1	Jordan	8
2	2002	Syria	Iraq	3–2 (a.e.t.)	Jordan	Iran	2–2 (a.e.t.) (4–2 p)	Syria	6
3	2004	Iran	Iran	4–1	Syria	Jordan	3–1	Iraq	6
4	2007	Jordan	Iran	2–1	Iraq	Jordan and Syria (Note: The two semi-finalists in 2007, 2008, and 2010 did not play a third-place match.)			6
5	2008	Iran	Iran	2–1	Jordan	Qatar and Syria			6
6	2010	Jordan	Kuwait	2–1	Iran	Iraq and Yemen			9
7	2012	Kuwait	Syria	1–0	Iraq	Oman	1–0	Bahrain	11
8	2013	Qatar	Qatar	2–0	Jordan	Bahrain	0–0 (a.e.t.) (3–2 p)	Kuwait	9
9	2019	Iraq	Bahrain	1–0	Iraq	(Note: There were neither semi-finals nor a third-place match in 2019.)			9
10	2026	Oman	Postponed						12

- a.e.t.: after extra time
- p: after penalty shoot-out
- TBD: to be determined

=== Teams reaching the top four ===
Teams reaching the top four
Team	Titles	Runners-up	Third place^{1}	Fourth place	Total
Iran	4 (2000, 2004^{*}, 2007, 2008^{*})	1 (2010)	1 (2002)		6
Iraq	1 (2002)	3 (2007, 2012, 2019^{*})	2 (2000, 2010^{2})	1 (2004)	7
Syria	1 (2012)	2 (2000, 2004)	2 (2007^{2}, 2008^{2})	1 (2002^{*})	6
Bahrain	1 (2019)		1 (2013)	1 (2012)	3
Qatar	1 (2013^{*})		1 (2008^{2})		2
Kuwait	1 (2010)			1 (2013)	2
Jordan		3 (2002, 2008, 2013)	2 (2004, 2007^{2*})	1 (2000^{*})	6
Yemen			1 (2010^{2})		1
Oman			1 (2012)		1

* = hosts
1 = includes semi-finals in case there was no third-place match
2 = semi-final

== Records and statistics ==
=== Top goalscorers by tournament ===
Year	Player(s)	Goals
2000	(Iraq) Razzaq Farhan	4
2002	(Iran) Alireza Nikbakht	2
2002	(Iraq) Razzaq Farhan	2
2002	(Jordan) Muayad Salim	2
2002	(Syria) Anas Sari	2
2004	(Iran) Ali Daei	5
2007	(Iran) Mehdi Rajabzadeh	2
2007	(Iraq) Salih Sadir	2
2008	(Iran) Kianoush Rahmati	3
2010	(Yemen) Ali Al-Nono	4
2012	(Oman) Qasim Said	4
2012	(Syria) Ahmad Al Douni	4
2013	(Qatar) Boualem Khoukhi	6
2019	(Iraq) Hussein Ali	3

== See also ==
- WAFF U-23 Championship
- WAFF U-19 Championship
- WAFF U-17 Championship
- WAFF Women's Championship
- Arabian Gulf Cup
- FIFA Arab Cup
- AFC Asian Cup
  - AFF Championship
  - CAFA Nations Cup
  - EAFF E-1 Football Championship
  - SAFF Championship
