= Chukwudi Nworgu =

Nigerian footballer

Personal information
- Date of birth: 12 December 1981 (age 44)
- Place of birth: Nigeria
- Height: 1.76 m (5 ft 9 in)
- Position: Forward

Team information
- Current team: Afrikansk FC Södertälje

Senior career*
Years	Team	Apps	(Gls)
2000–2001	Enyimba		
2002–2003	Metalurh Donetsk	0	(0)
2002–2003	→ Vorskla Poltava (loan)	6	(0)
2002–2003	Beitar Jerusalem	14	(2)
2003–2004	Kryvbas Kryvyi Rih	4	(0)
2004	Enyimba		
2004–2005	Hapoel Nazareth Illit	1	(0)
2006	Spartak Nizhny Novgorod	12	(0)
2007	Degerfors	2	(0)
2008	Syrianska	17	(2)
2009	Valsta Syrianska	12	(1)
2010	Gröndals IK	7	(0)
2015–2016	Afrikansk FC/AU IF Södertälje		
2017–	Afrikansk FC Södertälje		

International career
2002–2003	Nigeria	3	(0)
- * Club domestic league appearances and goals

Chukwudi Nworgu (born 12 December 1981) is a Nigerian retired professional footballer who played as a forward.

== Career ==
=== International ===
In November 2002, Nworgu made his debut for Nigeria in a 1–1 draw in a friendly match against Egypt.

== Career statistics ==
=== International ===
Nigeria
Year	Apps	Goals
2002	1	0
2003	2	0
Total	3	0

Statistics accurate as of match played 11 June 2003
