= King Abdullah II Stadium =

Multi-purpose stadium in Amman, Jordan

- Interactive map of King Abdullah II Stadium
- Location: Amman, Jordan
- Coordinates: 31°55′40.9″N 35°57′11.7″E
- Capacity: 13,265

Construction
- Built: 1999

Tenants
- Jordan national football team Al-Wehdat

The King Abdullah II Stadium (Arabic: ملعب الملك عبد الله الثاني) is a multi-purpose stadium located in Amman, Jordan. It is currently used mostly for football matches. The stadium holds 13,265 people.

== International football matches ==
| Date | Competition | Team | Score | Team |
|---|---|---|---|---|
| 6 September 2018 | Friendly | Jordan | 0–1 | Lebanon |
| 11 September 2018 | Friendly | Jordan | 0–0 | Oman |
| 17 November 2018 | Friendly | Jordan | 2–1 | India |
| 10 June 2025 | 2026 FIFA World Cup qualification | Palestine | 1–1 | Oman |

| Preceded by None | West Asian Football Federation Championship; Final Venue; 2000 | Succeeded by Abbasiyyin Stadium (Syria) Damascus |
| Preceded by Azadi Stadium (Iran) Tehran | West Asian Football Federation Championship; Final Venue; 2010 | Succeeded by Jaber Al-Ahmad International Stadium; Kuwait City |
