= Haitham Al-Shboul =

Jordanian footballer (born 1974)

Personal information
- Date of birth: 13 November 1974 (age 51)
- Place of birth: Amman, Jordan
- Height: 1.73 m (5 ft 8 in)
- Position: Midfielder

Senior career*
| Years | Team | Apps | (Gls) |
| 1992–2008 | Al-Faisaly | | |

International career
| 1997–2004 | Jordan | 62 | (6) |

Managerial career
- 2009–2012: Al-Faisaly (assistant manager)
- 2012: Sama Al-Sarhan
- 2012: Mansheyat Bani Hasan
- 2012–2013: Al-Shorta (assistant manager)
- 2014–2015: That Ras
- 2015–2016: Al-Jazeera
- 2016: Al-Faisaly (assistant manager)
- 2017: That Ras
- 2018: Al-Hussein SC
- 2018: Al-Shorta (assistant manager)
- 2018: Al-Shorta (caretaker)
- 2018–2020: Al-Shorta (assistant manager)
- 2020: Al-Faisaly
- 2020: Al-Shorta (caretaker)
- 2020–2021: Al-Shorta (assistant manager)
- 2021–23: Al-Diwaniya
- 2023–24: Naft Maysan
- 2024–: Al-Salt SC
- * Club domestic league appearances and goals

Haitham Al-Shboul (Arabic: هيثم الشبول; born 13 November 1974) is a Jordanian football manager and former player. He is a former head coach of Jordanian club Al-Faisaly.

== Career statistics ==
Scores and results list Jordan's goal tally first, score column indicates score after each Al-Shboul goal.

List of international goals scored by Haitham Al-Shboul
| No. | Date | Venue | Opponent | Score | Result | Competition |
|---|---|---|---|---|---|---|
| 1 | 27 August 1999 | Amman, Jordan | Oman | | 2–0 | 1999 Pan Arab Games |
| 2 | 16 January 2001 | Goa, India | Hong Kong | | 2–0 | Friendly |
| 3 | 17 August 2002 | Amman, Jordan | Kenya | | 1–1 | Friendly |
| 4 | 18 November 2003 | Amman, Jordan | North Korea | | 3–0 | 2004 AFC Asian Cup qualification |
| 5 | 9 June 2004 | Tehran, Iran | Iran | | 1–0 | 2006 FIFA World Cup qualification |
| 6 | 17 June 2004 | Tehran, Iran | Palestine | | 1–1 | 2004 West Asian Football Federation Championship |

== Managerial statistics ==
As of 8 December 2020

| Team | Nat | From | To | Record | | | | |
| Team | Nat | From | To | G | W | D | L | Win % |
|---|---|---|---|---|---|---|---|---|
| Mansheyat | (Jordan) | 15 June 2012 | 3 August 2012 | 4 | 1 | 0 | 3 | 25.00 |
| That Ras | (Jordan) | 4 November 2014 | 7 November 2015 | 31 | 13 | 9 | 9 | 41.94 |
| Al-Jazeera | (Jordan) | 21 November 2015 | 30 April 2016 | 19 | 9 | 5 | 5 | 47.37 |
| That Ras | (Jordan) | 17 June 2017 | 19 August 2017 | 1 | 0 | 0 | 1 | 0.00 |
| Al-Hussein SC | (Jordan) | 3 February 2018 | 11 May 2018 | 9 | 3 | 2 | 4 | 33.33 |
| Al-Shorta (Caretaker) | (Iraq) | 17 June 2018 | 18 July 2018 | 6 | 5 | 1 | 0 | 83.33 |
| Al-Faisaly | (Jordan) | 13 June 2020 | 15 August 2020 | 4 | 2 | 2 | 0 | 50.00 |
| Al-Shorta (Caretaker) | (Iraq) | 6 November 2020 | 8 December 2020 | 5 | 3 | 1 | 1 | 60.00 |
| Total | | | | 79 | 36 | 20 | 23 | 45.57 |
