= Khaled Saad =

Jordanian footballer

Personal information
- Full name: Khaled Saad Salem Al-Malta'ah
- Date of birth: 14 November 1981 (age 44)
- Place of birth: Zarqa, Jordan
- Height: 1.79 m (5 ft 10 in)
- Position: Midfielder

Youth career
- 1993–1999: Al-Faisaly

Senior career*
Years	Team	Apps	(Gls)
1999–2007	Al-Faisaly		
2007–2008	Zamalek		
2008–2009	Nejmeh		
2012–2013	Manshia Bani Hassan		
2013	Salalah		
2014	Fanja SC		

International career
2002-2003	Jordan U23		
2002–2008	Jordan	42	(5)
- * Club domestic league appearances and goals

Khaled Saad Salem Al-Malta'ah (Arabic: خالد سعد سالم المطالعة) is a retired Jordanian footballer.

== Career statistics ==
=== International ===
Scores and results list Oman's goal tally first.

#	Date	Venue	Opponent	Score	Result	Competition
1	23 July 2004	Shandong Provincial Stadium, Jinan, Shandong, China	Kuwait	1–0	2–0	2004 AFC Asian Cup
2	20 October 2004	Tripoli, Libya	Ecuador	3–0	3–0	Friendly
3	16 November 2005	Mikheil Meskhi Stadium, Tbilisi, Georgia	Georgia	2–1	2–3	Friendly
4	10 November 2006	Punjab Stadium, Lahore, Pakistan	Pakistan	3–0	3–0	2007 AFC Asian Cup qualification
5	20 June 2007	Amman International Stadium, Amman, Jordan	Lebanon	2–0	3–0	2007 West Asian Football Federation Championship
