= 2002 Arab Cup =

Eighth edition of the Arab Cup football competition

2002 Arab Cup كأس العرب 2002
2002 Prince Faisal bin Fahd Cup

Tournament details
- Host country: Kuwait
- Dates: 16–30 December
- Teams: 10 (from 2 confederations)
- Venue: 1 (in 1 host city)

Final positions
- Champions: Saudi Arabia (2nd title)
- Runners-up: Bahrain

Tournament statistics
- Matches played: 23
- Goals scored: 66 (2.87 per match)
- Top scorer(s): (Bahrain) Ahmed Hassan (Syria) Mohammad Rafe (4 goals each)
- Best player: (Saudi Arabia) Mohammed Noor
- Best goalkeeper: (Saudi Arabia) Mabrouk Zaid

The 2002 Arab Cup was the eighth edition of the Arab Cup football competition, hosted in the nation of Kuwait. Saudi Arabia, who were the defending champions from the last Arab Cup, again won the title for a 2nd time at the conclusion of the competition.

== Participating teams ==
10 teams participated in the tournament. Morocco was represented by their U-23 team.

Participants
Zone	Team
Hosts	Kuwait
Holders	Saudi Arabia
Zone 1 (Gulf Area)	Bahrain
Zone 2 (Red Sea)	Sudan
Zone 2 (Red Sea)	Yemen
Zone 3 (North Africa)	Morocco (Note: Under-23 Olympic Team was representing Country)
Zone 4 (East Region)	Lebanon
Zone 4 (East Region)	Jordan
Zone 4 (East Region)	Palestine
Zone 4 (East Region)	Syria

== Venues ==
2002 Arab Cup is located in Kuwait	Kuwait City
2002 Arab Cup is located in Kuwait	Al Kuwait Sports Club Stadium
2002 Arab Cup is located in Kuwait	Capacity: 12,350

== Group stage ==
=== Group A ===
Team	Pld	W	D	L	GF	GA	GD	Pts
Jordan	4	2	2	0	6	4	+2	8
Morocco U23	4	1	2	1	5	4	+1	5
Kuwait	4	1	2	1	6	6	0	5
Sudan	4	1	1	2	4	5	−1	4
Palestine	4	0	3	1	7	9	−2	3

16 December 2002

Kuwait	1–1	Morocco U23
Laheeb 46'		El Moubarki 26'

Al Kuwait Sports Club Stadium, Kuwait City
Attendance: 7,000
Referee: Mahmoud Abbas (Syria)
16 December 2002

Palestine	1–1	Jordan
Al-Kord 5'		Aqel 11'

Al Kuwait Sports Club Stadium, Kuwait City
Referee: Hicham Guirat (Tunisia)

18 December 2002

Morocco U23	1–1	Jordan
Kaïssi 4'		Abu Zema 64' (pen.)

Al Kuwait Sports Club Stadium, Kuwait City
Attendance: 1,500
Referee: Abdul Rahman Al-Zeid (Saudi Arabia)
18 December 2002

Kuwait	1–0	Sudan
Neda 90'

Al Kuwait Sports Club Stadium, Kuwait City
Attendance: 2,000
Referee: Mohamed Zekrini (Algeria)

20 December 2002

Jordan	2–1	Sudan
Salim 17'; Abu Zema 82' (pen.)		Ali 84'

Al Kuwait Sports Club Stadium, Kuwait City
Attendance: 2,000
Referee: Mahmoud Abbas (Syria)
20 December 2002

Morocco U23	3–1	Palestine
Armoumen 30', 40'; Kherrazi 88'		Al-Kord 52'

Al Kuwait Sports Club Stadium, Kuwait City
Attendance: 700
Referee: Mohamed Omar (United Arab Emirates)

23 December 2002

Sudan	2–2	Palestine
Farjallah 51'; Al-Tijani 88'		Salem 31'; Al-Kord 53'

Al Kuwait Sports Club Stadium, Kuwait City
Attendance: 2,000
Referee: Abdul Rahman Al-Zeid (Saudi Arabia)
23 December 2002

Jordan	2–1	Kuwait
Al-Zboun 69', 83'		B. Abdullah 86'

Al Kuwait Sports Club Stadium, Kuwait City
Attendance: 6,000
Referee: Hisham Qirat (Tunisia)

25 December 2002

Sudan	1–0	Morocco U23
Haitham 45'

Al Kuwait Sports Club Stadium, Kuwait City
25 December 2002

Kuwait	3–3	Palestine
Neda 30'; B. Abdullah 68', 73'		Asad 15'; Atura 38'; Al-Jaish 46'

Al Kuwait Sports Club Stadium, Kuwait City
Referee: Abdul Rahman Al-Zeid (Saudi Arabia)

=== Group B ===
Team	Pld	W	D	L	GF	GA	GD	Pts
Saudi Arabia	4	3	1	0	8	3	+5	10
Bahrain	4	2	1	1	6	3	+3	7
Syria	4	2	0	2	8	6	+2	6
Lebanon	4	1	1	2	5	7	−2	4
Yemen	4	0	1	3	5	13	−8	1

17 December 2002

Saudi Arabia	2–1	Bahrain
Al-Obaili 33'; Al-Meshal 71'	Report	Yousef 44'

Al Kuwait Sports Club Stadium, Kuwait City
Attendance: 7,000
Referee: Mohamed Guezzaz (Morocco)
17 December 2002

Yemen	0–4	Syria
		Rafe 26'; Al Sayed 52'; Al Khatib 57' (pen.), 70'

Al Kuwait Sports Club Stadium, Kuwait City
Attendance: 300
Referee: Mohamed Omar (United Arab Emirates)

19 December 2002

Bahrain	2–0	Syria
Hassan 82'; Al-Dosari 90' (pen.)

Al Kuwait Sports Club Stadium, Kuwait City
Referee: Qassem Hamza (Kuwait)
19 December 2002

Saudi Arabia	1–0	Lebanon
Tamim 90+2'	Report

Al Kuwait Sports Club Stadium, Kuwait City
Attendance: 700
Referee: Ridha Al-Baltaji (Egypt)

21 December 2002

Syria	4–1	Lebanon
Al Khatib 44'; Rafe 46', 52', 59'		Qassas 54'

Al Kuwait Sports Club Stadium, Kuwait City
Attendance: 1,000
Referee: Mohamed Guezzaz (Morocco)
21 December 2002

Bahrain	3–1	Yemen
Hassan 45', 83', 90'		Al-Salimi 89'

Al Kuwait Sports Club Stadium, Kuwait City
Attendance: 1,000
Referee: Ridha Al-Baltaji (Egypt)

24 December 2002

Lebanon	4–2	Yemen
Antar 11', 51', 60'; Hojeij 62'		Al-Qadimi 24'; Abboud 70'

Al Kuwait Sports Club Stadium, Kuwait City
Attendance: 1,000
Referee: Mohamed Guezzaz (Morocco)
24 December 2002

Syria	0–3	Saudi Arabia
	Report	Tukar 1'; Khariri 71'; Al-Meshal 90+3'

Al Kuwait Sports Club Stadium, Kuwait City
Attendance: 2,000
Referee: Mohamed Zekrini (Algeria)

26 December 2002

Yemen	2–2	Saudi Arabia
Al-Salimi 14'; Saeed 59'	Report	Al-Qahtani 36', 81'

Al Kuwait Sports Club Stadium, Kuwait City
Referee: Mohamed Guezzaz (Morocco)
26 December 2002

Lebanon	0–0	Bahrain

Al Kuwait Sports Club Stadium, Kuwait City
Attendance: 1,000
Referee: Hisham Qirat (Tunisia)

== Knockout stage ==
Semi-finals
28 Dec 2002 – Kuwait City
Saudi Arabia	2
Morocco U23	0
28 Dec 2002 – Kuwait City
Bahrain (a.e.t.)	2
Jordan	1

Final
30 Dec 2002 – Kuwait City
Saudi Arabia (a.e.t.)	1
Bahrain	0

=== Semi-finals ===
28 December 2002
9:49

Saudi Arabia	2–0	Morocco U23
Al-Waked 20'; Al-Meshal 57'

Al Kuwait Sports Club Stadium, Kuwait City
Attendance: 2,000
Referee: Mahmoud Abbas (Syria)
28 December 2002

Bahrain	2–1 (a.e.t.)	Jordan
Ali 79', 91'		Al-Zboun 43'

Al Kuwait Sports Club Stadium, Kuwait City
Attendance: 2,000
Referee: Qassem Hamza (Kuwait)

=== Final ===
In the semi-final, Saudi Arabia beat Morocco and Bahrain beat Jordan and met for a second time in the final.

The final match took place on 30 December 2002, at the Al Kuwait Sports Club Stadium in Kuwait City. It determined the winner of the 2002 Arab Cup. Saudi Arabia defeated Bahrain 1–0 after extra time to win their second consecutive Arab Cup.

30 December 2002

Saudi Arabia	1–0 (a.e.t.)	Bahrain
Noor 94'	Report

Al Kuwait Sports Club Stadium, Kuwait City
Attendance: 7,500
Referee: Mohamed Zekrini (Algeria)

== Winners ==
It is the second consecutive title for Saudi Arabia after winning the title of the last session in Doha at the expense of Qatar 3–1 in 1998, noting that it was entering the final for the third time after its 1992 loss to Egypt 2–3 in the Syrian city of Aleppo.

2002 Arab Cup winners

Saudi Arabia
Second title

== Awards ==
- Clean playing team: Jordan
- Fairplay team: Morocco

== Final ranking ==
R	Team	P	W	D	L	GF	GA	GD	Pts.
1	Saudi Arabia	6	5	1	0	11	3	+8	16
2	Bahrain	6	3	1	2	8	5	+3	10
Eliminated in the Semi-finals
3	Jordan	5	2	2	1	7	6	+1	8
4	Morocco	5	1	2	2	5	6	-1	5
Eliminated in the group stage
5	Syria	4	2	0	2	8	6	+2	6
6	Kuwait	4	1	2	1	6	6	0	5
7	Sudan	4	1	1	2	4	5	−1	4
8	Lebanon	4	1	1	2	5	7	−2	4
9	Palestine	4	0	3	1	7	9	−2	3
10	Yemen	4	0	1	3	5	13	−8	1
