= 2007 WAFF Championship =

4th WAFF Championship, held in Jordan in 2007

Tournament details
- Host country: Jordan
- Dates: 16–24 June
- Teams: 6 (from 1 confederation)
- Venue: 1 (in 1 host city)

Final positions
- Champions: Iran (3rd title)
- Runners-up: Iraq

Tournament statistics
- Matches played: 9
- Goals scored: 15 (1.67 per match)
- Top scorer(s): (Iran) Mehdi Rajabzadeh (Iraq) Salih Sadir (2 goals each)

The 2007 West Asian Football Federation Championship (Arabic: 2007 بطولة اتحاد غرب آسيا لكرة القدم), was the fourth international association football championship for national teams from West Asia organised by the West Asian Football Federation (WAFF). Hosted by Jordan, the competition ran from 16 to 24 June 2007 and was contested by the national teams of Iran, Iraq, Jordan, Lebanon, Palestine and Syria.

The tournament began with the first matches of the group stage on 16 June 2007 and ended with the final match on 24 June 2007. The final was contested by Iraq and defending champions Iran. Goals from Hossein Badamaki and Hashem Beikzadeh helped Iran to a 2–1 win as they were crowned champions for the third time.

== Background ==
The first edition of the biennial West Asian Football Federation Championship was held in Amman, Jordan in 2000. Iran were the defending champions after defeating Syria in the final in 2004. They were also the most successful team in the history of the competition after winning the title twice previously.

The 2006 WAFF Championship was originally to be played in Lebanon between 25 July and 3 August 2006. However, it was postponed as a result of the 2006 Lebanon War and later moved to be played in Jordan.

== Format ==
Originally, eight teams were due to take part but Qatar and the United Arab Emirates withdrew after the competition was postponed. They were included in the original draw which saw the competing teams drawn into two single round robin groups of four teams. The group winners and runners-up would contest the semi-finals which would decide the teams contesting the final. After the withdrawals, the competition continued with two groups of three rather than four teams.

=== Participants ===
- Iran
- Iraq
- Jordan
- Lebanon
- Palestine
- Syria

== Venue ==
All matches were played at the Amman International Stadium in Amman.

| 2007 WAFF Championship (Jordan) | Amman |
| 2007 WAFF Championship (Jordan) | Amman International Stadium |
| 2007 WAFF Championship (Jordan) | Capacity: 25,000 |

== Group stage ==
=== Group A ===
Syria and Jordan advanced to the semi-finals.

==== Table ====
| Team | Pld | W | D | L | GF | GA | GD | Pts | Qualification |
|---|---|---|---|---|---|---|---|---|---|
| Syria | 2 | 2 | 0 | 0 | 2 | 0 | +2 | 6 | Advance to the semi-finals |
| Jordan | 2 | 1 | 0 | 1 | 3 | 1 | +2 | 3 | Advance to the semi-finals |
| Lebanon | 2 | 0 | 0 | 2 | 0 | 4 | −4 | 0 | |

==== Matches ====
16 June 2007

| Lebanon | 0–1 | Syria |
|---|---|---|
| | | Chaabo 45' |

Amman International Stadium, Amman

18 June 2007

| Jordan | 0–1 | Syria |
|---|---|---|
| | | Al Baba 48' |

Amman International Stadium, Amman

20 June 2007

| Jordan | 3–0 | Lebanon |
|---|---|---|
| Ragheb 28'; Khaled Saad 53'; Al-Saify 58' |

Amman International Stadium, Amman

=== Group B ===
Iran and Iraq advanced to the semi-finals.

==== Table ====
| Team | Pld | W | D | L | GF | GA | GD | Pts | Qualification |
|---|---|---|---|---|---|---|---|---|---|
| Iran | 2 | 1 | 1 | 0 | 2 | 0 | +2 | 4 | Advance to the semi-finals |
| Iraq | 2 | 1 | 1 | 0 | 1 | 0 | +1 | 4 | Advance to the semi-finals |
| Palestine | 2 | 0 | 0 | 2 | 0 | 3 | −3 | 0 | |

==== Matches ====
16 June 2007

| Iran | 0–0 | Iraq |

Amman International Stadium, Amman

18 June 2007

| Iraq | 1–0 | Palestine |
|---|---|---|
| Mohammed 86' |

Amman International Stadium, Amman

20 June 2007

| Iran | 2–0 | Palestine |
|---|---|---|
| Meydavoudi 56'; Rajabzadeh 85' |

Amman International Stadium, Amman

== Semi-finals ==
Iraq defeated Syria 3–0 and Iran defeated Jordan 1–0 to advance to the final.

22 June 2007

| Syria | 0–3 | Iraq |
|---|---|---|
| | | Mahmoud 10' (pen.); Mnajed 42'; Sadir 85' |

Amman International Stadium, Amman

22 June 2007

| Iran | 1–0 | Jordan |
|---|---|---|
| Rajabzadeh 32' |

Amman International Stadium, Amman

== Final ==
Iran defeated Iraq 2–1 as they won the competition for the third time.

24 June 2007

| Iraq | 1–2 | Iran |
|---|---|---|
| Sadir 86' (pen.) | | Badamaki 9'; Beikzadeh 21' |

Amman International Stadium, Amman
