= 2004 WAFF Championship =

3rd WAFF Championship, held in Iran in 2004

Tournament details
- Host country: Iran
- Dates: 17–25 June
- Teams: 6 (from 1 confederation)
- Venue: 1 (in 1 host city)

Final positions
- Champions: Iran (2nd title)
- Runners-up: Syria
- Third place: Jordan
- Fourth place: Iraq

Tournament statistics
- Matches played: 10
- Goals scored: 37 (3.7 per match)
- Top scorer: (Iran) Ali Daei (5 goals)

The 2004 West Asian Football Federation Championship (Arabic: 2004 بطولة اتحاد غرب آسيا لكرة القدم), was the third international association football championship for national teams from West Asia organised by the West Asian Football Federation (WAFF). Hosted by Iran, the competition ran from 17 to 25 June 2004 and was contested by the national teams of Iran, Iraq, Jordan, Lebanon, Palestine and Syria.

The tournament began with the first matches of the group stage on 17 June 2004 and ended with the final match on 25 June 2004. The final was contested by hosts Iran and Syria. Goals from Ali Karimi, Ali Daei, Arash Borhani and Javad Nekounam helped Iran come from behind to defeat Syria 4–1 as they won the competition for the second time.

== Background ==
The first edition of the biennial West Asian Football Federation Championship was held in Amman, Jordan in 2000. Iraq were the defending champions after defeating Jordan in the final in 2002. Iran and Iraq were the most successful teams in the history of the competition after both winning the title once.

== Format ==
Six teams took part in the competition. They were drawn into two single round robin groups of three teams. The group winners and runners-up would contest the semi-finals which would decide the teams contesting the final and the third-placed play-off.

=== Participants ===
- Iran
- Iraq
- Jordan
- Lebanon
- Palestine
- Syria

== Venue ==
All matches were played at the Azadi Stadium in Tehran.

2004 WAFF Championship is located in Iran	Tehran
2004 WAFF Championship is located in Iran	Azadi Stadium
2004 WAFF Championship is located in Iran	Capacity: 100,000

== Group stage ==
=== Group A ===
Jordan and Iraq advanced to the semi-finals.

==== Table ====
Team	Pld	W	D	L	GF	GA	GD	Pts	Qualification
Jordan	2	1	1	0	3	1	+2	4	Advance to the semi-finals
Iraq	2	1	0	1	2	3	−1	3	Advance to the semi-finals
Palestine	2	0	1	1	2	3	−1	1	

==== Matches ====
17 June 2004

Palestine	1–1	Jordan
Al-Kord 12'		Al-Shboul 3'

Azadi Stadium, Tehran

19 June 2004

Iraq	2–1	Palestine
E. Mohammed 41', 83'		Al-Kord 40'

Azadi Stadium, Tehran

21 June 2004

Jordan	2–0	Iraq
Salim 48'; Shelbaieh 79'

Azadi Stadium, Tehran

=== Group B ===
Iran and Syria advanced to the semi-finals.

==== Table ====
Team	Pld	W	D	L	GF	GA	GD	Pts	Qualification
Iran	2	2	0	0	11	1	+10	6	Advance to the semi-finals
Syria	2	1	0	1	4	8	−4	3	Advance to the semi-finals
Lebanon	2	0	0	2	1	7	−6	0	

==== Matches ====
17 June 2004

Iran	4–0	Lebanon
Daei 15' (pen.), 62', 88'; Nekounam 80'

Azadi Stadium, Tehran

19 June 2004

Syria	3–1	Lebanon
Al-Rashed 7'; Sheikh Al-Eshreh 27'; Rafe 45'		Zein 65'

Azadi Stadium, Tehran

21 June 2004

Syria	1–7	Iran
Al Sayed 82'		Daei 29'; Nikbakht 30'; Nosrati 45+3'; Borhani 55', 85'; Karimi 86'; Majidi 89' (pen.)

Azadi Stadium, Tehran

== Semi-finals ==
Syria defeated Jordan 4–3 on penalties and Iran defeated Iraq 2–1.

23 June 2004

Jordan	1–1 (a.e.t.)	Syria
Amer Deeb 21'		Rafe 55'
Penalties
	3–4

Azadi Stadium, Tehran

23 June 2004

Iran	2–1	Iraq
Nekounam 4'; Borhani 55'		Mnajed 30'

Azadi Stadium, Tehran

== Third-place play-off ==
Goals from Badran Al-Shagran and Qusai Abu Alieh helped Jordan defeat Iraq 3–1 as they finished third.

25 June 2004

Jordan	3–1	Iraq
Al-Shagran 27', 47'; Abu Alieh 76'		E. Mohammed 81'

Azadi Stadium, Tehran

== Final ==
Goals from Ali Karimi, Ali Daei, Arash Borhani and Javad Nekounam saw Iran defeat Syria 4–1 as they won the competition for the second time.

25 June 2004

Iran	4–1	Syria
Karimi 34'; Daei 59'; Borhani 69'; Nekounam 75'		Raja Rafe 3'

Azadi Stadium, Tehran
