= 2002 FIFA World Cup qualification – AFC first round =

Football competition

The AFC first round of 2002 FIFA World Cup qualification was contested between 40 AFC members.

The top country in each group at the end of the stage progressed to the second round, where the ten remaining teams were divided into two groups of five.

== Group 1 ==
Pos	Team	Pld	W	D	L	GF	GA	GD	Pts	Qualification	Oman national football team	Syria national football team	Laos national football team	Philippines national football team
1	Oman	6	5	1	0	33	3	+30	16	Second round	—	2–0	12–0	7–0
2	Syria	6	4	1	1	40	6	+34	13		3–3	—	11–0	12–0
3	Laos	6	1	1	4	3	40	−37	4		0–7	0–9	—	2–0
4	Philippines	6	0	1	5	2	29	−27	1		0–2	1–5	1–1	—

30 April 2001
16:00 UTC+03

Syria	12–0	Philippines
Bayazid 14', 16', 49', 77', 80'; Jabban 25'; Srour 27' (pen.); Moustafa 45'; Shehadeh 46'; M. Boushi 59'; Afash 75' (pen.); Malki 89'	Report

Al-Hamadaniah Stadium, Aleppo
Attendance: 20,000
Referee: Siamak Bakhshi (Iran)
30 April 2001
16:00 UTC+04

Oman	12–0	Laos
Al-Dhabit 6', 23' (pen.), 30', 45', 45+1'; Mubarak Al-Siyabi 21'; Al-Mukhani 39', 44'; Nasser Zayid 62' (pen.); Fawzi Bashir 81', 85'; Al-Araimi 84'	Report

Sultan Qaboos Sports Complex, Muscat
Attendance: 2,000
Referee: Ammar Ammar (Lebanon)

4 May 2001
16:30 UTC+03

Syria	5–1	Philippines
Srour 42', 54'; Bayazid 71'; Moussa 77', 87'	Report	Barsales 59'

Al-Hamadaniah Stadium, Aleppo
Attendance: 19,000
Referee: Jang Sok Jin (North Korea)
4 May 2001
19:15 UTC+04

Oman	7–0	Laos
Al-Dhabit 15', 79'; Mubarak Al-Siyabi 36'; Al-Araimi 39', 42'; Al-Mukhaini 43'; Samir 90'	Report

Sultan Qaboos Sports Complex, Muscat
Attendance: 2,099
Referee: Gyanu Shrestha (Nepal)

7 May 2001
16:30 UTC+03

Syria	11–0	Laos
Afash 15', 89'; M. Boushi 25', 79'; Bayazid 31', 53', 90'; Moussa 33'; Srour 55', 64'; Moustafa 69'	Report

Al-Hamadaniah Stadium, Aleppo
Attendance: 9,000
Referee: Ahmad Abu Khadijeh (Jordan)
7 May 2001
19:15 UTC+04

Oman	7–0	Philippines
Al-Dhabit 43' (pen.), 81'; Al-Mukhaini 45', 61', 68', 79'; Said 83'	Report

Sultan Qaboos Sports Complex, Muscat
Attendance: 2,200
Referee: Abdul Rahman Al-Delawar (Bahrain)

11 May 2001
16:00 UTC+03

Laos	0–9	Syria
	Report	Moustafa 2', 50'; Srour 34'; Bayazid 37'; Shehadeh 46'; Zaher 55', 65'; Al-Khatib 75'; Al Sayed 81'

Al-Hamadaniah Stadium, Aleppo
Attendance: 12,000
Referee: Mamed Mamedov (Turkmenistan)
11 May 2001
19:15 UTC+04

Philippines	0–2	Oman
	Report	Al-Mukhaini 11', 56'

Sultan Qaboos Sports Complex, Muscat
Attendance: 3,000
Referee: Sergey Tsaregradskiy (Kazakhstan)

18 May 2001
16:30 UTC+03

Syria	3–3	Oman
Bayazid 4'; Afash 56'; Srour 68'	Report	Al-Araimi 35'; Al-Dhabit 55'; Samir 81'

Al-Hamadaniah Stadium, Aleppo
Attendance: 18,000
Referee: Lu Jun (China)
19 May 2001
18:00 UTC+07

Laos	2–0	Philippines
Phounsamay 15'; Dalaphone 55'	Report

Laos National Stadium, Vientiane
Attendance: 7,000
Referee: Võ Minh Trí (Vietnam)

25 May 2001
19:15 UTC+04

Oman	2–0	Syria
Mubarak Al-Siyabi 48'; Samir 67'	Report

Sultan Qaboos Sports Complex, Muscat
Attendance: 25,000
Referee: Masayoshi Okada (Japan)
26 May 2001
19:00 UTC+08

Philippines	1–1	Laos
Doña 20'	Report	Khouphachansy 81'

PhilSports Complex, Pasig
Attendance: 1,000
Referee: Jajat Hidayat (Indonesia)

== Group 2 ==
Pos	Team	Pld	W	D	L	GF	GA	GD	Pts	Qualification	Iran national football team	Tajikistan national football team	Guam national football team	Myanmar national football team
1	Iran	2	2	0	0	21	0	+21	6	Second round	—	2–0	19–0	—
2	Tajikistan	2	1	0	1	16	2	+14	3		—	—	16–0	—
3	Guam	2	0	0	2	0	35	−35	0		—	—	—	—
4	Myanmar	0	0	0	0	0	0	0	0	Withdrew	—	—	—	—

24 November 2000
14:30 UTC+04:30

Iran	19–0	Guam
Majidi 12', 75', 79'; Bagheri 13', 23', 33', 48', 67', 77'; Karimi 19', 55', 58', 86'; Vahedi Nikbakht 31'; Daei 34' (pen.), 53', 72'; Bakhtiarizadeh 43', 69'	Report

Takhti Stadium, Tabriz
Attendance: 30,000
Referee: Talaat Najm (Lebanon)

26 November 2000
14:30 UTC+04:30

Tajikistan	16–0	Guam
Ashurmamadov 3', 16'; Muminov 13'; Knitel 20'; Khojaev 26', 39', 70'; Hamidov 31', 47', 77', 89' (pen.); Fuzailov 52'; Berdykulov 62', 67'; Jabbarov 77'; Usmonov 87'	Report

Takhti Stadium, Tabriz
Attendance: 5,000
Referee: Hani Ballan (Qatar)

28 November 2000
14:30 UTC+04:30

Iran	2–0	Tajikistan
Daei 47'; Hasheminasab 54'	Report

Takhti Stadium, Tabriz
Attendance: 35,000
Referee: Mahmoud Al-Rifaee (Syria)

== Group 3 ==
Pos	Team	Pld	W	D	L	GF	GA	GD	Pts	Qualification	Qatar national football team	Palestine national football team	Malaysia national football team	Hong Kong national football team
1	Qatar	6	5	1	0	14	3	+11	16	Second round	—	2–1	5–1	2–0
2	Palestine	6	2	1	3	8	9	−1	7		1–2	—	1–0	1–0
3	Malaysia	6	2	1	3	8	11	−3	7		0–0	4–3	—	2–0
4	Hong Kong	6	1	1	4	3	10	−7	4		0–3	1–1	2–1	—

4 March 2001
13:00 UTC+08

Qatar	5–1	Malaysia
Al-Enazi 10', 37', 59'; Mustafa 51' (pen.); Al-Tamimi 75'	Report	Talib 9'

Hong Kong Stadium, Hong Kong
Attendance: 500
Referee: Toru Kamikawa (Japan)
4 March 2001
15:15 UTC+08

Hong Kong	1–1	Palestine
Ho Man 72'	Report	Ayoub 64'

Hong Kong Stadium, Hong Kong
Attendance: 7,000
Referee: Han Byung-Hwa (South Korea)

8 March 2001
18:00 UTC+08

Palestine	1–2	Qatar
Ayoub 54'	Report	Al Naemi 31'; Mustafa 65'

Hong Kong Stadium, Hong Kong
Attendance: 5,000
Referee: Ekachai Tanaddernkao (Thailand)
8 March 2001
20:15 UTC+08

Malaysia	2–0	Hong Kong
Rakhli 46', 79'	Report

Hong Kong Stadium, Hong Kong
Attendance: 5,000
Referee: Musallam Al Bloushi (United Arab Emirates)

11 March 2001
13:00 UTC+08

Palestine	1–0	Malaysia
Al-Jaish 36'	Report

Hong Kong Stadium, Hong Kong
Attendance: 4,540
Referee: Mohammad Tajul Islam (Bangladesh)
11 March 2001
15:15 UTC+08

Hong Kong	0–2	Qatar
	Report	Al-Enazi 42'; Feng 67' (o.g.)

Hong Kong Stadium, Hong Kong
Attendance: 4,500
Referee: Toru Kamikawa (Japan)

20 March 2001
15:30 UTC+03

Palestine	1–0	Hong Kong
Lafi 58'	Report

Jassim Bin Hamad Stadium, Doha
Attendance: 500
Referee: Abdul Rahman Al-Zaid (Saudi Arabia)
20 March 2001
18:15 UTC+03

Malaysia	0–0	Qatar
	Report

Jassim Bin Hamad Stadium, Doha
Attendance: 2,000
Referee: Rahim Rahimi (Iran)

23 March 2001
18:15 UTC+03

Qatar	2–1	Palestine
Al-Enazi 24'; Hassan 45'	Report	Ayoub 30'

Jassim Bin Hamad Stadium, Doha
Attendance: 4,000
Referee: Naotsugu Fuse (Japan)
23 March 2001
20:15 UTC+03

Hong Kong	2–1	Malaysia
Feng 11'; Keung 78'	Report	Omar 86'

Jassim Bin Hamad Stadium, Doha
Attendance: 100
Referee: Muflah Mohamed (Oman)

25 March 2001
18:15 UTC+03

Qatar	3–0	Hong Kong
Al Naemi 45'; Mubarak 89'; Al-Tamimi 90'	Report

Jassim Bin Hamad Stadium, Doha
Attendance: 2,000
Referee: Khader Haj Khader (Syria)
25 March 2001
18:15 UTC+03

Malaysia	4–3	Palestine
Rakhli 21'; Omar 54', 68'; Idrus 56'	Report	Ayoub 4'; Al-Holi 30' (pen.); Al-Jaish 90'

Grand Hamad Stadium, Doha
Attendance: 400
Referee: Abdul Rahman Al-Zaid (Saudi Arabia)

== Group 4 ==
Pos	Team	Pld	W	D	L	GF	GA	GD	Pts	Qualification	Bahrain national football team	Kuwait national football team	Kyrgyzstan national football team	Singapore national football team
1	Bahrain	6	5	0	1	9	4	+5	15	Second round	—	1–2	1–0	2–0
2	Kuwait	6	4	1	1	9	3	+6	13		0–1	—	2–0	1–1
3	Kyrgyzstan	6	1	1	4	3	9	−6	4		1–2	0–3	—	1–1
4	Singapore	6	0	2	4	3	8	−5	2		1–2	0–1	0–1	—

3 February 2001
18:00 UTC+08

Bahrain	1–2	Kuwait
Al Sadi 90'	Report	Al Huwaidi 66'; Al-Sohi 72'

National Stadium, Singapore
Attendance: 25,000
Referee: Kim Hoe Sung (South Korea)
3 February 2001
20:00 UTC+08

Singapore	0–1	Kyrgyzstan
	Report	Kovalenko 83'

National Stadium, Singapore
Attendance: 25,000
Referee: Abdul Aziz A. Al Dokhail (Saudi Arabia)

6 February 2001
18:00 UTC+08

Bahrain	1–0	Kyrgyzstan
Al Sadi 86'	Report

National Stadium, Singapore
Attendance: 1,000
Referee: Kazuhiko Matsumura (Japan)
6 February 2001
20:00 UTC+08

Kuwait	1–1	Singapore
Abdullah 61'	Report	Shah 86'

National Stadium, Singapore
Attendance: 12,000
Referee: Suresh Srinivasan (India)

9 February 2001
18:00 UTC+08

Kyrgyzstan	0–3	Kuwait
	Report	Asel 61'; Al Huwaidi 85'; Al-Mutairi 90'

National Stadium, Singapore
Attendance: 1,000
Referee: Zhu Liuyi (China)
9 February 2001
20:00 UTC+08

Singapore	1–2	Bahrain
Ali 65'	Report	Al Sadi 15', 25'

National Stadium, Singapore
Attendance: 25,000
Referee: Kazuhiko Matsumura (Japan)

21 February 2001
16:45 UTC+03

Kyrgyzstan	1–2	Bahrain
Jumagulov 8'	Report	Salmeen 23'; Hassan 74'

Kuwait National Stadium, Kuwait City
Attendance: 1,099
Referee: Park Sang-Gu (South Korea)
21 February 2001
19:00 UTC+03

Singapore	0–1	Kuwait
	Report	Al-Mutairi 52'

Kuwait National Stadium, Kuwait City
Attendance: 12,099
Referee: Toshimitsu Yoshida (Japan)

24 February 2001
16:45 UTC+03

Kuwait	2–0	Kyrgyzstan
Al Huwaidi 21'; Laheeb 87'	Report

Kuwait National Stadium, Kuwait City
Attendance: 8,000
Referee: Zhang Yeduan (China)
24 February 2001
19:00 UTC+03

Bahrain	2–0	Singapore
Eid 40'; Al Sadi 43'	Report

Kuwait National Stadium, Kuwait City
Attendance: 800
Referee: Youssuf Al Aqily (Saudi Arabia)

27 February 2001
16:45 UTC+03

Kyrgyzstan	1–1	Singapore
Kovalenko 77'	Report	Ali 60'

Kuwait National Stadium, Kuwait City
Attendance: 25,099
Referee: Mohammad Abdur Rakib (Bangladesh)
27 February 2001
19:00 UTC+03

Kuwait	0–1	Bahrain
	Report	Mohammed 72'

Kuwait National Stadium, Kuwait City
Attendance: 18,000
Referee: Zhang Yeduan (China)

== Group 5 ==
Pos	Team	Pld	W	D	L	GF	GA	GD	Pts	Qualification	Thailand national football team	Lebanon national football team	Sri Lanka national football team	Pakistan national football team
1	Thailand	6	5	1	0	20	5	+15	16	Second round	—	2–2	4–2	3–0
2	Lebanon	6	4	1	1	26	5	+21	13		1–2	—	4–0	6–0
3	Sri Lanka	6	1	1	4	8	20	−12	4		0–3	0–5	—	3–1
4	Pakistan	6	0	1	5	5	29	−24	1		0–6	1–8	3–3	—

13 May 2001
15:30 UTC+03

Thailand	4–2	Sri Lanka
Kiatisuk 46', 51'; Therdsak 53'; Thawatchai 84'	Report	Raheem 20', 50'

Beirut Municipal Stadium, Beirut
Attendance: 1,000
Referee: Gong Jianping (China)
13 May 2001
18:00 UTC+03

Lebanon	6–0	Pakistan
Zein 6', 32', 88'; Hojeij 49'; Santos 51' (pen.); Hamdan 90'	Report

Beirut Municipal Stadium, Beirut
Attendance: 5,000
Referee: Halim Abdul Hamid (Malaysia)

15 May 2001
18:00 UTC+03

Thailand	3–0	Pakistan
Seksan 35', 52'; Therdsak 86'	Report

Beirut Municipal Stadium, Beirut
Attendance: 1,000
Referee: Sabah Kasim (Iraq)
15 May 2001
20:30 UTC+03

Lebanon	4–0	Sri Lanka
R. Antar 44', 63'; Hojeij 65'; Kassas 90'	Report

Beirut Municipal Stadium, Beirut
Attendance: 4,000
Referee: Halim Abdul Hamid (Malaysia)

17 May 2001
18:00 UTC+03

Pakistan	3–3	Sri Lanka
Zaman 45', 80', 85'	Report	Raheem 45'; Bandanage 72'; Kassun 83'

Beirut Municipal Stadium, Beirut
Attendance: 1,000
Referee: Gong Jianping (China)
17 May 2001
20:30 UTC+03

Lebanon	1–2	Thailand
R. Antar 9'	Report	Seksan 15'; Kiatisuk 27'

Beirut Municipal Stadium, Beirut
Attendance: 15,000
Referee: Kim Young-joo (South Korea)

26 May 2001
16:00 UTC+07

Pakistan	1–8	Lebanon
Arshad 20'	Report	F. Antar 5'; Ghazarian 10', 60'; R. Antar 32', 42'; Santos 46', 88'; Marcílio 78'

Suphachalasai Stadium, Bangkok
Attendance: 6,000
Referee: S. Kumbalingam Kennedy (Singapore)
26 May 2001
18:30 UTC+07

Sri Lanka	0–3	Thailand
	Report	Seksan 37'; Kiatisuk 50', 60'

Suphachalasai Stadium, Bangkok
Attendance: 10,000
Referee: Zhang Jianjun (China)

28 May 2001
16:00 UTC+07

Sri Lanka	0–5	Lebanon
	Report	Ghazarian 25'; F. Antar 37'; Marcílio 48'; Zein 64'; Yenkibarian 82'

Suphachalasai Stadium, Bangkok
Attendance: 6,000
Referee: Zhang Jianjun (China)
28 May 2001
18:30 UTC+07

Pakistan	0–6	Thailand
	Report	Kiatisuk 10', 51', 55', 74'; Niweat 78'; Surachai 83'

Suphachalasai Stadium, Bangkok
Attendance: 10,000
Referee: Fareed Al-Marzouqi (United Arab Emirates)

30 May 2001
16:00 UTC+07

Sri Lanka	3–1	Pakistan
Jayasuriya 6', 48'; Bandanage 11'	Report	Arshad 9'

Suphachalasai Stadium, Bangkok
Attendance: 8,000
Referee: Viktor Kolpakov (Kyrgyzstan)
30 May 2001
18:30 UTC+07

Thailand	2–2	Lebanon
Seksan 73'; Tawan 77'	Report	Ghazarian 35'; Hojeij 87'

Suphachalasai Stadium, Bangkok
Attendance: 30,000
Referee: Toru Kamikawa (Japan)

== Group 6 ==
Pos	Team	Pld	W	D	L	GF	GA	GD	Pts	Qualification	Iraq national football team	Kazakhstan national football team	Nepal national football team	Macau national football team
1	Iraq	6	4	2	0	28	5	+23	14	Second round	—	1–1	4–2	8–0
2	Kazakhstan	6	4	2	0	20	2	+18	14		1–1	—	4–0	3–0
3	Nepal	6	2	0	4	13	25	−12	6		1–9	0–6	—	4–1
4	Macau	6	0	0	6	2	31	−29	0		0–5	0–5	1–6	—

N.B. group originally scheduled to play 6 matches in Kathmandu, 25–29 March 2001. After Nepal withdrew from organising the matches, the AFC assigned the group to Almaty, Kazakhstan. Following a protest by Iraq, it was decided to first play 6 matches in either Amman or Baghdad (later fixed at Baghdad) and the remaining 6 in Almaty.

12 April 2001
17:00 UTC+04

Nepal	0–6	Kazakhstan
	Report	Litvinenko 11', 28'; Urazbakhtin 21'; Lunyov 73'; Baltiev 75'; Kadyrkulov 82' (pen.)

Al-Shaab Stadium, Baghdad
Attendance: 45,000
Referee: Mohammed Kousa (Syria)
12 April 2001
19:15 UTC+04

Iraq	8–0	Macau
H.Mohammed 21', 31', 33', 35', 76'; Jeayer 60', 83'; Kadhim 88'	Report

Al-Shaab Stadium, Baghdad
Attendance: 45,000
Referee: Panya Hanlumyaung (Thailand)

14 April 2001
17:00 UTC+04

Kazakhstan	3–0	Macau
Avdeyev 11'; Litvinenko 57'; Gorovenka 68'	Report

Al-Shaab Stadium, Baghdad
Attendance: 15,000
Referee: Kim Tae-Young (South Korea)
14 April 2001
19:15 UTC+04

Nepal	1–9	Iraq
Rayamajhi 25'	Report	Al-Hail 6' (pen.), 20' (pen.); H.Mohammed 15', 59'; Jafar 21'; Najim 36'; E. Mohammed 55'; Kadhim 65', 75'

Al-Shaab Stadium, Baghdad
Attendance: 25,000
Referee: Huang Junjie (China)

16 April 2001
17:00 UTC+04

Nepal	4–1	Macau
Rayamajhi 18', 61'; Thapa 31'; Khadka 74' (pen.)	Report	Cheong 28'

Al-Shaab Stadium, Baghdad
Attendance: 45,000
Referee: Mohamed Senhoub (Yemen)
16 April 2001
19:15 UTC+04

Kazakhstan	1–1	Iraq
Baltiev 6'	Report	Al-Hail 31' (pen.)

Al-Shaab Stadium, Baghdad
Attendance: 50,000
Referee: Kim Tae-Young (South Korea)

21 April 2001
16:00 UTC+07

Kazakhstan	4–0	Nepal
Shevchenko 43', 73'; Baltiev 69' (pen.); Gorovenka 87'	Report

Almaty Central Stadium, Almaty
Attendance: 15,000
Referee: Abdulla Al Bannai (United Arab Emirates)
21 April 2001
19:00 UTC+07

Macau	0–5	Iraq
	Report	Al-Hail 45', 80'; Hassan 57', 90'; Obeid 88'

Almaty Central Stadium, Almaty
Attendance: 8,000
Referee: Mongkol Rungklay (Thailand)

23 April 2001
16:00 UTC+07

Macau	0–5	Kazakhstan
	Report	Byakov 50', 70'; Avdeyev 51', 72'; Gorovenka 83'

Almaty Central Stadium, Almaty
Attendance: 8,000
Referee: Balu Sundarraj (India)
23 April 2001
19:00 UTC+07

Iraq	4–2	Nepal
Obeid 27'; Al-Hail 30'; E.Mohammed 33'; Mushraf 54'	Report	Khadka 37'; Rayamajhi 63'

Almaty Central Stadium, Almaty
Attendance: 5,000
Referee: Subkhiddin Mohd Salleh (Malaysia)

25 April 2001
16:00 UTC+07

Macau	1–6	Nepal
Leong 50'	Report	Rayamajhi 38', 49', 56'; Maharjan 52'; Lama 67'; Thapa 90'

Almaty Central Stadium, Almaty
Attendance: 12,000
Referee: Masoud Moradi (Iran)
25 April 2001
19:00 UTC+07

Iraq	1–1	Kazakhstan
Mahmoud 42'	Report	Litvinenko 32'

Almaty Central Stadium, Almaty
Attendance: 25,000
Referee: Mongkol Rungklay (Thailand)

== Group 7 ==
Pos	Team	Pld	W	D	L	GF	GA	GD	Pts	Qualification	Uzbekistan national football team	Turkmenistan national football team	Jordan national football team	Chinese Taipei national football team
1	Uzbekistan	6	4	2	0	20	5	+15	14	Second round	—	1–0	2–2	7–0
2	Turkmenistan	6	4	0	2	12	7	+5	12		2–5	—	2–0	1–0
3	Jordan	6	2	2	2	12	7	+5	8		1–1	1–2	—	6–0
4	Chinese Taipei	6	0	0	6	0	25	−25	0		0–4	0–5	0–2	—

23 April 2001
16:00 UTC+05

Turkmenistan	2–0	Jordan
Meredov 52'; Agabaýew 81'	Report

Pakhtakor Markaziy Stadium, Tashkent
Attendance: 6,000
Referee: Kwon Jong-chul (South Korea)
23 April 2001
19:00 UTC+05

Uzbekistan	7–0	Chinese Taipei
Irismetov 3', 23', 68', 74'; Dionisiev 21'; Maminov 35'; Georgiev 43'	Report

Pakhtakor Markaziy Stadium, Tashkent
Attendance: 45,000
Referee: Mohamed Al Saeedi (United Arab Emirates)

25 April 2001
16:00 UTC+05

Chinese Taipei	0–2	Jordan
	Report	Al-Laham 16'; Shelbaieh 57'

Pakhtakor Markaziy Stadium, Tashkent
Attendance: 5,000
Referee: Yoshitsugu Katayama (Japan)
25 April 2001
19:00 UTC+05

Uzbekistan	1–0	Turkmenistan
Qosimov 63'	Report

Pakhtakor Markaziy Stadium, Tashkent
Attendance: 55,000
Referee: Jalal Moradi (Iran)

27 April 2001
16:00 UTC+05

Chinese Taipei	0–5	Turkmenistan
	Report	Goçgulyýew 5' (pen.); Meredov 44'; Gogoladze 53', 62'; Borodolimov 72'

Pakhtakor Markaziy Stadium, Tashkent
Attendance: 6,000
Referee: Kwon Jong-chul (South Korea)
27 April 2001
19:00 UTC+05

Uzbekistan	2–2	Jordan
Maminov 53' (pen.); Shirshov 65'	Report	Al-Shagran 13'; Abu Touk 24'

Pakhtakor Markaziy Stadium, Tashkent
Attendance: 55,000
Referee: Ahmad Khalidi Supian (Malaysia)

3 May 2001
17:30 UTC+03

Jordan	6–0	Chinese Taipei
Abu Touk 45', 49' (pen.); Al-Shagran 61'; Al-Awadat 85'; Hamarsheh 87', 89'	Report

Amman International Stadium, Amman
Attendance: 8,000
Referee: Selearajen Subramaniam (Malaysia)
3 May 2001
20:00 UTC+03

Turkmenistan	2–5	Uzbekistan
Baýramow 42', 44'	Report	Qosimov 21' (pen.); Irismetov 35'; Bakayev 48'; Akopyants 82'; Georgiev 88'

Amman International Stadium, Amman
Attendance: 800
Referee: Deshapryia Arambekade (Sri Lanka)

5 May 2001
17:30 UTC+03

Chinese Taipei	0–4	Uzbekistan
	Report	Irismetov 15', 90'; Qosimov 59', 87'

Amman International Stadium, Amman
Attendance: 400
Referee: Khaled Sadeq (Kuwait)
5 May 2001
20:00 UTC+03

Jordan	1–2	Turkmenistan
Abu Touk 7'	Report	Gogoladze 25'; Durdyýew 85'

Amman International Stadium, Amman
Attendance: 4,000
Referee: Santhan Nagalingam (Singapore)

7 May 2001
17:30 UTC+03

Turkmenistan	1–0	Chinese Taipei
Gogoladze 37'	Report

Amman International Stadium, Amman
Attendance: 20
Referee: Hiroshi Tanabe (Japan)
7 May 2001
20:00 UTC+03

Jordan	1–1	Uzbekistan
Abu Touk 54' (pen.)	Report	Maminov 77' (pen.)

Amman International Stadium, Amman
Attendance: 100
Referee: Khaled Sadeq (Kuwait)

== Group 8 ==
Pos	Team	Pld	W	D	L	GF	GA	GD	Pts	Qualification	United Arab Emirates national football team	Yemen national football team	India national football team	Brunei national football team
1	United Arab Emirates	6	4	0	2	21	5	+16	12	Second round	—	3–2	1–0	4–0
2	Yemen	6	3	2	1	14	8	+6	11		2–1	—	3–3	1–0
3	India	6	3	2	1	11	5	+6	11		1–0	1–1	—	5–0
4	Brunei	6	0	0	6	0	28	−28	0		0–12	0–5	0–1	—

Source: RSSSF
7 April 2001
20:15 UTC+08

Brunei	0–5	Yemen
	Report	Ahmed 8'; Al-Salimi 52'; Awad 82'; Al-Nono 86', 88'

Hassanal Bolkiah National Stadium, Bandar Seri Begawan
Attendance: 6,000
Referee: Hsu Chao-Lo (Chinese Taipei)
8 April 2001
16:00 UTC+05:30

India	1–0	United Arab Emirates
Alberto 71'	Report

Bangalore Stadium, Bangalore
Attendance: 12,000
Referee: Sun Baojie (China)

14 April 2001
20:15 UTC+08

Brunei	0–12	United Arab Emirates
	Report	Salem Ali 1', 58', 67', 75', 81'; Omar 12', 45'; Hussain 27'; Khater 38'; Jumaa 49'; Momin 50' (o.g.); Masoud 90'

Hassanal Bolkiah National Stadium, Bandar Seri Begawan
Attendance: 1,000
Referee: Fong Yau Fat Jame (Hong Kong)
15 April 2001
16:00 UTC+05:30

India	1–1	Yemen
Bhutia 53'	Report	Al Ghurbani 43'

Bangalore Stadium, Bangalore
Attendance: 21,000
Referee: Chalach Piromya (Thailand)

26 April 2001
19:30 UTC+04

United Arab Emirates	1–0	India
Khater 63'	Report

Sheikh Khalifa International Stadium, Al Ain City
Attendance: 12,000
Referee: Halim Abdul Hamid (Malaysia)
27 April 2001
16:00 UTC+03

Yemen	1–0	Brunei
Al Ghurbani 75'	Report

Althawra Sports City Stadium, San‘a'
Attendance: 30,000
Referee: Jassem Al-Khori (Qatar)

4 May 2001
16:00 UTC+03

Yemen	3–3	India
Al-Salimi 13' (pen.), 20', 62'	Report	Ancheri 16', 38'; Vijayan 51'

Althawra Sports City Stadium, San‘a'
Attendance: 25,000
Referee: Suleman Abo Allo (Syria)
4 May 2001
19:30 UTC+04

United Arab Emirates	4–0	Brunei
Salem Ali 20', 50'; Al Kass 70'; Khalil 86'	Report

Sheikh Khalifa International Stadium, Al Ain City
Attendance: 7,000
Referee: Menfi Redha Falah (Iraq)

11 May 2001
16:00 UTC+03

Yemen	2–1	United Arab Emirates
Al Ghurbani 52'; Al-Nono 73'	Report	Al Kass 44'

Althawra Sports City Stadium, San‘a'
Attendance: 17,000
Referee: Mohammad Mansour (Lebanon)
11 May 2001
20:15 UTC+08

Brunei	0–1	India
	Report	Ancheri 75'

Hassanal Bolkiah National Stadium, Bandar Seri Begawan
Attendance: 4,000
Referee: Hassan Al Ajmi (Oman)

18 May 2001
19:30 UTC+04

United Arab Emirates	3–2	Yemen
Al Kass 37', 40'; Salem Ali 45'	Report	Al-Nono 39'; Al-Salimi 61'

Sheikh Khalifa International Stadium, Al Ain City
Attendance: 20,000
Referee: Qasem Shaban (Kuwait)
20 May 2001
16:00 UTC+05:30

India	5–0	Brunei
Alberto 12'; Vijayan 23'; Bhutia 35' (pen.); Ancheri 59'; Hakim 80'	Report

Bangalore Stadium, Bangalore
Attendance: 7,000
Referee: Nail Lutfullin (Uzbekistan)

== Group 9 ==
Pos	Team	Pld	W	D	L	GF	GA	GD	Pts	Qualification	China national football team	Indonesia national football team	Maldives national football team	Cambodia national football team
1	China	6	6	0	0	25	3	+22	18	Second round	—	5–1	10–1	3–1
2	Indonesia	6	4	0	2	16	7	+9	12		0–2	—	5–0	6–0
3	Maldives	6	1	1	4	8	19	−11	4		0–1	0–2	—	6–0
4	Cambodia	6	0	1	5	2	22	−20	1		0–4	0–2	1–1	—

1 April 2001
16:00 UTC+05

Maldives	6–0	Cambodia
Umar 33', 79'; Abdulativ 52', 90'; Shiham 68'; Luthfy 82'	Report

Rasmee Dhandu Stadium, Malé
Attendance: 11,850
Referee: Abayawansa Mahasena Yapa (Sri Lanka)

8 April 2001
16:00 UTC+07

Indonesia	5–0	Maldives
Setyabudi 7'; Yulianto 13'; Sakti 51'; Nawawi 61'; Pamungkas 67'	Report

Gelora Bung Karno Stadium, Jakarta
Attendance: 30,000
Referee: Santhan Nagalingam (Singapore)

15 April 2001
15:30 UTC+07

Cambodia	1–1	Maldives
Makara 78'	Report	Naseem 67'

Phnom Penh National Olympic Stadium, Phnom Penh
Attendance: 3,000
Referee: U Tun Hla Aung (Myanmar)

22 April 2001
16:00 UTC+07

Indonesia	6–0	Cambodia
Nasa 26' (o.g.); Nawawi 42', 46', 71'; Tecuari 73'; Yulianto 76'	Report

Gelora Bung Karno Stadium, Jakarta
Attendance: 32,000
Referee: Jerry Andres (Philippines)
22 April 2001
19:00 UTC+08

China	10–1	Maldives
Xu Yunlong 12', 45'; Wu Chengying 18'; Xie Hui 42', 50', 63'; Fan Zhiyi 52', 74' (pen.); Yang Chen 61'; Li Weifeng 89'	Report	Jameel 61'

Shaanxi Province Stadium, Xi'an
Attendance: 42,000
Referee: Kim Jong Sik (North Korea)

28 April 2001
16:00 UTC+05

Maldives	0–1	China
	Report	Xie Hui 44'

Rasmee Dhandu Stadium, Malé
Attendance: 12,000
Referee: Omar Abu Loom (Jordan)
29 April 2001
15:30 UTC+07

Cambodia	0–2	Indonesia
	Report	Purdjianto 78'; Pamungkas 87'

Lambert Stadium, Phnom Penh
Attendance: 7,000
Referee: Michael Andrews (India)

6 May 2001
15:30 UTC+07

Cambodia	0–4	China
	Report	Li Jinyu 5', 63'; Qu Bo 43'; Ma Mingyu 58'

Lambert Stadium, Phnom Penh
Attendance: 7,000
Referee: Tayeb Shamsuzzaman (Bangladesh)
6 May 2001
16:00 UTC+05

Maldives	0–2	Indonesia
	Report	Yulianto 10'; Sofyan 50'

Rasmee Dhandu Stadium, Malé
Attendance: 11,576
Referee: Sultan Mujalli Al Aalaq (Bahrain)

13 May 2001
15:15 UTC+08

China	5–1	Indonesia
Li Weifeng 50'; Yang Chen 62'; Xie Hui 71', 90'; Qi Hong 82'	Report	Yulianto 40'

Kunming Tuodong Sports Center, Kunming
Attendance: 37,000
Referee: Toru Kamikawa (Japan)

20 May 2001
19:30 UTC+08

China	3–1	Cambodia
Ma Mingyu 5'; Xu Yunlong 22'; Li Bing 87'	Report	Makara 12'

Guangdong Olympic Stadium, Guangzhou
Attendance: 27,000
Referee: Buddhi Gurung (Nepal)

27 May 2001
16:00 UTC+07

Indonesia	0–2	China
	Report	Xie Hui 45'; Wu Chengying 69'

Gelora Bung Karno Stadium, Jakarta
Attendance: 50,000
Referee: Saad Kameel Mane (Kuwait)

== Group 10 ==
Pos	Team	Pld	W	D	L	GF	GA	GD	Pts	Qualification	Saudi Arabia national football team	Vietnam national football team	Bangladesh national football team	Mongolia national football team
1	Saudi Arabia (H)	6	6	0	0	30	0	+30	18	Second round	—	5–0	6–0	6–0
2	Vietnam	6	3	1	2	9	9	0	10		0–4	—	0–0	4–0
3	Bangladesh	6	1	2	3	5	15	−10	5		0–3	0–4	—	2–2
4	Mongolia	6	0	1	5	2	22	−20	1		0–6	0–1	0–3	—

(H) Hosts
8 February 2001
18:30 UTC+03

Vietnam	0–0	Bangladesh
	Report

Prince Mohamed bin Fahd Stadium, Dammam
Attendance: 3,099
Referee: Abdullah Al-Harrasi (Oman)
8 February 2001
20:30 UTC+03

Saudi Arabia	6–0	Mongolia
Al-Shalhoub 10', 25'; Al-Dosari 23'; Abdulghani 30', 59'; Al-Otaibi 71'	Report

Prince Mohamed bin Fahd Stadium, Dammam
Attendance: 12,000
Referee: Jassim Al Hail (Qatar)

10 February 2001
18:30 UTC+03

Mongolia	0–1	Vietnam
	Report	Nguyễn Hồng Sơn 45' (pen.)

Prince Mohamed bin Fahd Stadium, Dammam
Attendance: 1,000
Referee: Ibrahim Abu Elaish (Palestine)
10 February 2001
20:30 UTC+03

Bangladesh	0–3	Saudi Arabia
	Report	Al-Meshal 30', 85'; Al-Jaber 63'

Prince Mohamed bin Fahd Stadium, Dammam
Attendance: 5,000
Referee: Fareed Al-Marzouqi (United Arab Emirates)

12 February 2001
18:30 UTC+03

Mongolia	0–3	Bangladesh
	Report	Alfaz 41', 60'; Kanchan 85'

Prince Mohamed bin Fahd Stadium, Dammam
Attendance: 2,000
Referee: Abdulwahid Al-Khamesy (Yemen)
12 February 2001
20:30 UTC+03

Saudi Arabia	5–0	Vietnam
Al-Meshal 17', 88'; Al-Jaber 29', 70', 90'	Report

Prince Mohamed bin Fahd Stadium, Dammam
Attendance: 3,000
Referee: Jaafaar Mahdi Al-Khabbaz (Bahrain)

15 February 2001
18:30 UTC+03

Mongolia	0–6	Saudi Arabia
	Report	Al-Jaber 20'; Al-Shalhoub 24'; Al-Meshal 28'; Al-Dosari 40', 86'; Al-Khilaiwi 76'

Prince Mohamed bin Fahd Stadium, Dammam
Attendance: 5,000
Referee: Salem Mujghef (Jordan)

15 February 2001
20:30 UTC+03

Bangladesh	0–4	Vietnam
	Report	Nguyễn Văn Sỹ 65'; Nguyễn Hồng Sơn 73', 87' (pen.); Nguyễn Trung Vĩnh 77'

Prince Mohamed bin Fahd Stadium, Dammam
Attendance: 3,000
Referee: Saeed Bathaei Naeeni (Iran)

17 February 2001
18:30 UTC+03

Vietnam	4–0	Mongolia
Nguyễn Lương Phúc 3', 87'; Nguyễn Hồng Sơn 15', 21'	Report

Prince Mohamed bin Fahd Stadium, Dammam
Attendance: 1,000
Referee: Fareed Al-Marzouqi (United Arab Emirates)
17 February 2001
20:30 UTC+03

Saudi Arabia	6–0	Bangladesh
Harthi 5'; Al-Meshal 27', 28', 43'; Al-Dosari 33', 38'	Report

Prince Mohamed bin Fahd Stadium, Dammam
Attendance: 15,000
Referee: Abdullah Al-Harrasi (Oman)

19 February 2001
18:30 UTC+03

Bangladesh	2–2	Mongolia
Sujan 80' (pen.), 82'	Report	Davaa 36'; Buman-Uchral 90+4'

Prince Mohamed bin Fahd Stadium, Dammam
Attendance: 2,099
Referee: Saeed Bathaei Naeeni (Iran)
19 February 2001
20:30 UTC+03

Vietnam	0–4	Saudi Arabia
	Report	Al-Meshal 31', 71', 79'; Al-Dosari 88'

Prince Mohamed bin Fahd Stadium, Dammam
Attendance: 8,000
Referee: Salem Mujghef (Jordan)

== Goalscorers ==
There were 481 goals scored in 111 matches, for an average of 4.33 goals per match.

11 goals

- (Saudi Arabia) Talal Al-Meshal
- (Syria) Said Bayazid

10 goals

- (Oman) Hani Al-Dhabit

9 goals

- (Oman) Yaqoob Juma Al-Mukhaini
- (Thailand) Kiatisuk Senamuang

8 goals

- (United Arab Emirates) Yaser Salem Ali

7 goals

- (China) Xie Hui
- (Iraq) Hesham Mohammed
- (Nepal) Nirajan Rayamajhi
- (Syria) Bashar Serur
- (Uzbekistan) Jafar Irismetov

6 goals

- (Iran) Karim Bagheri
- (Iraq) Abdul-Wahab Abu Al-Hail
- (Saudi Arabia) Obeid Al-Dosari

5 goals

- (Bahrain) Yusuf A'Amer Al Sadi
- (Jordan) Esam Abu Touk
- (Lebanon) Roda Antar
- (Qatar) Mohammed Salem Al-Enazi
- (Saudi Arabia) Sami Al-Jaber
- (Thailand) Seksan Piturat
- (Vietnam) Nguyen Hong Son
- (Yemen) Adel Al-Salimi

4 goals

- (India) Jo Paul Ancheri
- (Indonesia) Kurniawan Dwi Yulianto
- (Indonesia) Uston Nawawi
- (Iran) Ali Daei
- (Iran) Ali Karimi
- (Kazakhstan) Oleg Litvinenko
- (Lebanon) Haitham Zein
- (Lebanon) Wartan Ghazarian
- (Oman) Mohammed Khamis Al-Araimi
- (Syria) Nihad Haj Moustafa
- (Syria) Mohammed Nasser
- (Tajikistan) Sukhrob Khamidov
- (Turkmenistan) Kakha Gogoladze
- (United Arab Emirates) Saeed Al Kass
- (Uzbekistan) Mirjalol Qosimov
- (Yemen) Ali Al-Nono

3 goals

- (China) Xu Yunlong
- (Iran) Farhad Majidi
- (Iraq) Ahmad Kadhim
- (Kazakhstan) Igor Avdeyev
- (Kazakhstan) Ruslan Baltiev
- (Kazakhstan) Konstantin Gorovenka
- (Kuwait) Jasem Al Huwaidi
- (Lebanon) Moussa Hojeij
- (Lebanon) Santos
- (Malaysia) Hairuddin Omar
- (Malaysia) Akmal Rizal Ahmad Rakhli
- (Oman) Taqi Mubarak
- (Oman) Majdi Shaaban Samir
- (Pakistan) Gohar Zaman
- (Saudi Arabia) Mohammad Al-Shalhoub
- (Sri Lanka) Imthyas Raheem
- (Syria) Mouhanad Bouchi
- (Syria) Jomard Moussa
- (Tajikistan) Rustam Khojaev
- (Uzbekistan) Vladimir Maminov
- (Yemen) Abdulsalam Al Ghurbani

2 goals

- (Bangladesh) Alfaz Ahmed
- (Bangladesh) Mohammed Sujan
- (Cambodia) Chea Makara
- (China) Fan Zhiyi
- (China) Li Jinyu
- (China) Li Weifeng
- (China) Ma Mingyu
- (China) Wu Chengying
- (China) Yang Chen
- (India) Jules Alberto
- (India) Baichung Bhutia
- (India) I. M. Vijayan
- (Indonesia) Bambang Pamungkas
- (Iran) Sohrab Bakhtiarizadeh
- (Iraq) Abbas Hassan Hassun
- (Iraq) Sabah Jeayer
- (Iraq) Emad Mohammed
- (Iraq) Haider Obeid
- (Jordan) Rateb Al Awadat
- (Jordan) Badran Al-Shagran
- (Kazakhstan) Dmitriy Byakov
- (Kazakhstan) Maksim Shevchenko
- (Kuwait) Khalaf Al-Mutairi
- (Kyrgyzstan) Ilia Kovalenko
- (Lebanon) Faisal Antar
- (Lebanon) Marcílio
- (Maldives) Adam Abdulativ
- (Maldives) Ali Umar
- (Nepal) Hari Khadka
- (Nepal) Basanta Thapa
- (Oman) Fawzi Bashir
- (Pakistan) Muhammad Arshad
- (Palestine) Emad Abou El-Kair
- (Palestine) Mohammed Al-Jeesh
- (Palestine) Imad Ayoub
- (Qatar) Dahi Al Naemi
- (Qatar) Jassim Al-Tamimi
- (Qatar) Mubarak Mustafa
- (Saudi Arabia) Hussein Sulaimani
- (Sri Lanka) Channa Ediri Bandanage
- (Sri Lanka) Kasun Jayasuriya
- (Syria) Raghdan Shehadeh
- (Syria) Khaled Zaher
- (Thailand) Therdsak Chaiman
- (Tajikistan) Aliyor Ashurmamadov
- (Tajikistan) Zaker Berdykulov
- (Turkmenistan) Wladimir Baýramow
- (Turkmenistan) Djumadurdy Meredov
- (United Arab Emirates) Subait Khater
- (United Arab Emirates) Mohammad Omar
- (Uzbekistan) Georgi Georgiev
- (Vietnam) Nguyen Luong Phuc

1 goal

- (Bahrain) Khamis Eid
- (Bahrain) Mohammad Hassan
- (Bahrain) Mohammed Husain
- (Bahrain) Mohamed Salmeen
- (Bangladesh) Rokonuzzaman Kanchan
- (China) Li Bing
- (China) Qi Hong
- (China) Qu Bo
- (Hong Kong) Chan Ho Man
- (Hong Kong) Feng Ji-zhi
- (Hong Kong) Keung He-chi
- (India) Abdul Hakim
- (Indonesia) Agung Setyabudi
- (Indonesia) Aples Tecuari
- (Indonesia) Bima Sakti
- (Indonesia) Eko Purdjianto
- (Indonesia) Ismed Sofyan
- (Iran) Mehdi Hasheminasab
- (Iran) Alireza Vahedi Nikbakht
- (Iraq) Habib Jafar
- (Iraq) Haidar Mahmoud
- (Iraq) Amer Mushraf
- (Iraq) Haidar Najim
- (Jordan) Belal Al Laham
- (Jordan) Mahmoud Shelbaieh
- (Jordan) Ghanem Yousef Aldayeh
- (Kazakhstan) Askhat Kadyrkulov
- (Kazakhstan) Yevgeniy Lunev
- (Kazakhstan) Rafael Urazbakhtin
- (Kuwait) Bashar Abdullah
- (Kuwait) Naser Al-Sauhi
- (Kuwait) Ali Asel
- (Kuwait) Faraj Laheeb
- (Kyrgyzstan) Zamirbek Jumagulov
- (Laos) Valasine Dalaphone
- (Laos) Phengta Phounsamay
- (Laos) Chanthy Souksombaph
- (Lebanon) Mohammad Kassas
- (Lebanon) Korken Yenkibarian
- (Macau) Kit Leong Cheong
- (Macau) Kim Meng Leong
- (Maldives) Mohamed Jameel
- (Maldives) Ashraf Luthfy
- (Maldives) Ismail Naseem
- (Maldives) Ali Shiham
- (Malaysia) Irwan Fadzli Idrus
- (Malaysia) Rosdi Talib
- (Mongolia) B. Buman-Uchral
- (Mongolia) Bayarzorig Davaa
- (Nepal) Deepak Lama
- (Nepal) Bal Gopal Maharjan
- (Oman) Samir Said
- (Oman) Nasser Zayid
- (Palestine) Fadi Abulatifa
- (Palestine) Jamal Al-Holi
- (Philippines) Yanti Barsales
- (Philippines) Jimmy Dona
- (Qatar) Abdul-Aziz Hassan
- (Qatar) Meshal Mubarak
- (Saudi Arabia) Mohammed Al-Khilaiwi
- (Saudi Arabia) Marzouk Al-Otaibi
- (Saudi Arabia) Mohsin Harthi
- (Singapore) Noh Alam Shah
- (Singapore) Mohd Noor Ali
- (Singapore) Ishak Ratna
- (Sri Lanka) Weerarathne Kassun
- (Syria) Faras Al Khatib
- (Syria) Maher Al Sayed
- (Syria) Tarek Jabban
- (Syria) Maher Malki
- (Tajikistan) Rahmatullo Fuzailov
- (Tajikistan) Shukhrat Jabbarov
- (Tajikistan) Denis Knitel
- (Tajikistan) Tokhirjon Muminov
- (Tajikistan) Rustam Usmonov
- (Thailand) Niweat Siriwong
- (Thailand) Surachai Jirasirichote
- (Thailand) Thawatchai Damrong-Ongtrakul
- (Thailand) Totchtawan Sripan
- (Turkmenistan) Rejepmyrat Agabaýew
- (Turkmenistan) Yuri Borodolimov
- (Turkmenistan) Gurbangeldi Durdyýew
- (Turkmenistan) Goçguly Goçgulyýew
- (United Arab Emirates) Mohammad Ibrahim Hussain
- (United Arab Emirates) Abdulsalaam Jumaa
- (United Arab Emirates) Faisal Khalil
- (United Arab Emirates) Fahed Masoud
- (Uzbekistan) Andrey Akopyants
- (Uzbekistan) Ulugbek Bakayev
- (Uzbekistan) Alexei Dionisiyev
- (Uzbekistan) Nikolay Shirshov
- (Vietnam) Nguyễn Trung Vĩnh
- (Vietnam) Nguyen Van Sy
- (Yemen) Ali Aboud Awad
- (Yemen) Anwar Ahmed

1 own goal

- (Brunei) Ali Momin (against the United Arab Emirates)
- (Cambodia) Samel Nasa (against Indonesia)
- (Hong Kong) Feng Ji-zhi (against Qatar)
- (Thailand) Surachai Jirasirichote (against Lebanon)
