= Philippines national football team results (2000–2009) =

This is a list of the Philippines national football team results from 2000 to 2009.

== 2000 ==
23 January 2000 AFC Asian Cup qualification	China	8–0	Philippines	Ho Chi Minh City, Vietnam
	Su Maozhen 3', 12', 19', 35', 45'; Hao Haidong 26'; Yao Xia 41'; Li Tie 80'			Stadium: Thống Nhất Stadium; Referee: Duraman Zulkifle (Brunei)

26 January 2000 AFC Asian Cup qualification	Vietnam	3–0	Philippines	Ho Chi Minh City, Vietnam
	Vu Cong Tuyen 21'; Ngo Quang Truong 72', 88'			Stadium: Thống Nhất Stadium

29 January 2000 AFC Asian Cup qualification	Guam	0–2	Philippines	Ho Chi Minh City, Vietnam
			N. Fegidero 63'; T. Fegidero 86'	Stadium: Thống Nhất Stadium

6 November 2000 Tiger Cup GS	Indonesia	3–0	Philippines	Chiang Mai, Thailand
16:00 (UTC+7)	Aji Santoso 31'; Kurniawan Dwi Yulianto 58'; Eko Purdjianto 84'			Stadium: 700th Anniversary Stadium; Referee: Mohd Nazri Abdullah (Malaysia)

8 November 2000 Tiger Cup GS	Myanmar	3–0	Philippines	Chiang Mai, Thailand
19:00 (Note: ThaiFootball.com reports this kick-off time as 16:00.) (UTC+7)	Thet Naing Soe 65'; Zaw Htike 69'; Nay Thu Hlaing 71'			Stadium: 700th Anniversary Stadium; Referee: Nguyen Van Mui (Vietnam)

12 November 2000 Tiger Cup GS	Thailand	2–0	Philippines	Chiang Mai, Thailand
19:00 (UTC+7)	Kiatisuk Senamuang 4'; Anurak Srikerd 14'			Stadium: 700th Anniversary Stadium; Referee: Nguyen Van Mui (Vietnam)

== 2001 ==
25 April Friendly	Lebanon	3–0	Philippines	Beirut, Lebanon
	R. Antar 36'; F. Antar 64'; dos Santos 69'	Report		Stadium: Camille Chamoun Sports City Stadium

30 April 2002 FIFA World Cup qualification	Syria	12–0	Philippines	Aleppo, Syria
16:00 (UTC+3)	Al Said 14', 16', 49', 77', 80'; Jabban 25'; Serur 27' (pen.); Haj Al-Boushi 45'; Shehadeh 46'; Bouchi 59'; Nasser Al-Afash 75' (pen.); Malki 89'	Report		Stadium: Al-Hamadaniah Stadium; Attendance: 20,000; Referee: Siamak Bakhshi (Iran)

4 May 2002 FIFA World Cup qualification	Philippines	1–5	Syria	Aleppo, Syria
16:30 (UTC+3)	Barsales 59'	Report	Serur 42', 54'; Al Said 71'; Moussa 77', 87'	Stadium: Al-Hamadaniah Stadium; Attendance: 19,000; Referee: Jang Sok Jin (Korea DPR)

7 May 2002 FIFA World Cup qualification	Oman	7–0	Philippines	Muscat, Oman
19:15 (UTC+4)	Al-Dhabit 43' (pen.), 81'; Al-Mukhaini 45', 61', 68', 79'; Said 83'	Report		Stadium: Sultan Qaboos Sports Complex; Attendance: 2,200; Referee: Abdul Rahman Al-Delawar (Bahrain)

11 May 2002 FIFA World Cup qualification	Philippines	0–2	Oman	Muscat, Oman
19:15 (UTC+4)	Al-Mukhaini 11', 56'	Report		Stadium: Sultan Qaboos Sports Complex; Attendance: 3,000; Referee: Sergey Tsaregradskiy (Kazakhstan)

19 May 2002 FIFA World Cup qualification	Laos	2–0	Philippines	Vientiane, Laos
18:00 (UTC+7)	Phounsamay 15'; Dalaphone 55'	Report		Stadium: Laos National Stadium; Attendance: 7,000; Referee: Vo Minh Tri (Vietnam)

26 May 2002 FIFA World Cup qualification	Laos	1–1	Philippines	Pasig, Philippines
19:00 (UTC+8)	Khouphachansy 81'	Report	Doña 20'	Stadium: PhilSports Football and Athletics Stadium; Attendance: 1,000; Referee: Jajat Hidayat (Indonesia)

== 2002 ==
11 December Friendly	Singapore	2–0	Philippines	Singapore
	Gonçalves 71'; Daud 90+1'	Report		Stadium: Singapore National Stadium; Referee: Santhan Nagalingam (Singapore)

17 December 2002 Tiger Cup GS	Philippines	1–6	Myanmar	Jakarta, Indonesia
16:05 (UTC+7)	Gonzalez 81'		Aung Kyaw Moe 18', 52'; Zaw Htaik 35'; Soe Lin Tun 45'; Zaw Zaw 56'; Tint Naing Tun Thein 63'	Stadium: Gelora Bung Karno Stadium; Referee: Subkhiddin Mohd Salleh (Malaysia)

19 December 2002 Tiger Cup GS	Vietnam	4–1	Philippines	Jakarta, Indonesia
18:35 (UTC+7)	Huỳnh Hồng Sơn 60', 72'; Lê Huỳnh Đức 68' (pen.), 79'		Cañedo 71'	Stadium: Gelora Bung Karno Stadium; Referee: Santhan Nagalingham (Singapore)

21 December 2002 Tiger Cup GS	Cambodia	1–0	Philippines	Jakarta, Indonesia
16:05 (UTC+7)	Kanyanith 90'			Stadium: Gelora Bung Karno Stadium; Referee: Jimmy Napitupulu (Indonesia)

23 December 2002 Tiger Cup GS	Indonesia	13–1	Philippines	Jakarta, Indonesia
18:35 (UTC+7)	Bambang 1', 29', 35', 82'; Zaenal 6', 38', 41', 57'; Budi 16'; Sugiantoro 55', 75'; Imran 81'; Licuanan 88' (o.g.)		Go 78'	Stadium: Gelora Bung Karno Stadium; Attendance: 50,340; Referee: Khanthachai Virat (Thailand)

== 2004 ==
8 December 2004 Tiger Cup GS	Philippines	0–1	Myanmar	Kuala Lumpur, Malaysia
18:00 (UTC+8)			San Day Thien 90+2'	Stadium: Bukit Jalil National Stadium; Referee: Vo Minh Tri (Vietnam)

10 December 2004 Tiger Cup GS	Malaysia	4–1	Philippines	Kuala Lumpur, Malaysia
20:45 (UTC+8)	Liew 17'; Khalid 67', 77' (pen.); Kaironnisam 74'		Gould 90+3'	Stadium: Bukit Jalil National Stadium; Referee: Jimmy Napitupulu (Indonesia)

14 December 2004 Tiger Cup GS	Philippines	2–1	Timor-Leste	Kuala Lumpur, Malaysia
18:00 (UTC+8)	Caligdong 90+1', 90+3'	(Note: This match was not a full 'A' international friendly as per FIFA website)	Do Rego 59'	Stadium: Bukit Jalil National Stadium; Referee: Jimmy Napitupulu (Indonesia)

16 December 2004 Tiger Cup GS	Thailand	3–1	Philippines	Kuala Lumpur, Malaysia
18:00 (UTC+8)	Ittipol 42'; Sarif 56'; Suriya 89'		Caligdong 27'	Stadium: KLFA Stadium; Referee: Subash Anthony Lazar (Singapore)

== 2006 ==
26 March Friendly	Thailand	5–0	Philippines	Chonburi, Thailand
	Jakkrit 13'; Terratep 20', 44'; Kittisak 58'; Phaisarn 90'	Report		Stadium: Chonburi Municipality Stadium

1 April 2006 AFC Challenge Cup GS	Chinese Taipei	1–0	Philippines	Chittagong, Bangladesh
18:00 (UTC+6)	Chuang Wei-lun 20'	Report		Stadium: MA Aziz Stadium; Attendance: 4,000; Referee: Lee Gi-Young (Korea Republic)

5 April 2006 AFC Challenge Cup GS	Philippines	1–1	Afghanistan	Chittagong, Bangladesh
18:00 (UTC+6)	Valeroso 59'	Report	Maqsood 28'	Stadium: MA Aziz Stadium; Attendance: 3,000; Referee: Salem Mujghef (Jordan)

12 November 2007 AFF Championship qualification	Philippines	1–2	Laos	Bacolod, Philippines
16:30 (UTC+8)	C. Greatwich 62'		Sisomephone 47'; Phaphouvanin 49'	Stadium: Panaad Stadium

14 November 2007 AFF Championship qualification	Philippines	7–0	Timor-Leste	Bacolod, Philippines
16:30 (UTC+8)	P. Younghusband 22', 25' (pen.), 36', 69'; C. Greatwich 27'; Zerrudo 51'; Caligdong 82'			Stadium: Panaad Stadium

18 November 2007 AFF Championship qualification	Philippines	1–0	Cambodia	Bacolod, Philippines
16:30 (UTC+8)	Borromeo 81' (pen.)			Stadium: Panaad Stadium

20 November 2007 AFF Championship qualification	Philippines	4–1	Brunei	Bacolod, Philippines
16:30 (UTC+8)	Del Rosario 25'; P. Younghusband 59', 90'; Caligdong 73'		Ramlee 81'	Stadium: Panaad Stadium

== 2007 ==
7 January Friendly	Singapore	4–1	Philippines	Singapore
	Bennett 12'; Amri 29'; Daud 59', 71'	Report	J. Younghusband 18'	Stadium: Choa Chu Kang Stadium

12 January 2007 AFF Championship GS	Malaysia	4–0	Philippines	Bangkok, Thailand
16:30 (UTC+7)	Hairuddin 9', 80'; Nizaruddin 16'; Del Rosario 69' (o.g.)	Report		Stadium: Suphachalasai Stadium; Attendance: 5,000; Referee: Abbas Daud (Singapore)

12 January 2007 AFF Championship GS	Thailand	4–0	Philippines	Bangkok, Thailand
19:00 (UTC+7)	Chaikamdee 15', 28'; Thonkanya 21'; Samana 84'	Report		Stadium: Suphachalasai Stadium; Attendance: 30,000

12 January 2007 AFF Championship GS	Myanmar	0–0	Philippines	Bangkok, Thailand
19:00 (UTC+8)		Report		Stadium: Thai Army Sports Stadium; Attendance: 500; Referee: Abbas Daud (Singapore)

== 2008 ==
13 May 2008 AFC Challenge Cup qualification	Brunei	0–1	Philippines	Iloilo City, Philippines
15:30 (UTC+8)		Report	Caligdong 28'	Stadium: Iloilo Sports Complex; Attendance: 3,500; Referee: Ali Saleem (Maldives)

15 May 2008 AFC Challenge Cup qualification	Philippines	0–0	Tajikistan	Iloilo City, Philippines
15:30 (UTC+8)		Report		Stadium: Iloilo Sports Complex; Attendance: 4,500; Referee: Ali Al-Badawi (United Arab Emirates)

17 May 2008 AFC Challenge Cup qualification	Philippines	3–0	Bhutan	Barotac Nuevo, Philippines
15:30 (UTC+8)	Gould 41'; P. Younghusband 43'; Rinchen 58' (o.g.)	Report		Stadium: Barotac Nuevo Plaza Field; Attendance: 7,000; Referee: Ali Saleem (Maldives)

17 October 2008 AFF Championship qualification	Philippines	1–0	Timor-Leste	Phnom Penh, Cambodia
14:00 (UTC+7)	Borromeo 68'	Report		Stadium: National Olympic Stadium

19 October 2008 AFF Championship qualification	Brunei	1–1	Philippines	Phnom Penh, Cambodia
16:00 (UTC+7)	Said 17'	Report	Gould 40'	Stadium: National Olympic Stadium; Referee: Setiyono Midi (Indonesia)

21 October 2008 AFF Championship qualification	Philippines	1–2	Laos	Phnom Penh, Cambodia
14:00 (UTC+7)	Araneta 32'	Report	Lounglath 56' (pen.); Phaphouvanin 59'	Stadium: National Olympic Stadium

23 October 2008 AFF Championship qualification	Cambodia	2–3	Philippines	Phnom Penh, Cambodia
16:00 (UTC+7)	El Nasa 14', 44'	Report	Borromeo 19'; C. Greatwich 36'; Gould 53'	Stadium: National Olympic Stadium; Attendance: 15,000

== 2009 ==
14 April 2010 AFC Challenge Cup qualification	Philippines	1–0	Bhutan	Malé, Maldives
21:00 (UTC+5)	Gould 13'	Report		Stadium: Kaohsiung National Stadium; Attendance: 200; Referee: Kadhum Auda (Iraq)

16 April 2010 AFC Challenge Cup qualification	Maldives	3–2	Philippines	Malé, Maldives
16:00 (UTC+5)	Fazeel 26' (pen.); Ashfaq 45'; Naseer 82'	Report	Borromeo 11'; Gould 90+2'	Stadium: Galolhu National Stadium; Attendance: 9,000; Referee: Alireza Faghani (Iran))

18 April 2010 AFC Challenge Cup qualification	Turkmenistan	5–0	Philippines	Malé, Maldives
16:00 (UTC+5)	Del Rosario 26' (o.g.); Şamyradow 54', 63'; Nasyrow 58'; Urazow 65'	Report		Stadium: Galolhu National Stadium; Attendance: 400; Referee: Naser Al-Ghafary (Jordan)
