= Pakistan national football team results (2000–2009) =

The following are the Pakistan national football team results in its official international matches from 2000 to 2009.

== Results ==
Key
Win
Draw
Defeat

=== 2000 ===
2 April 2000 2000 AFC Asian Cup qualification	Palestine	2–0	Pakistan	Doha, Qatar
	El-Manasri 1'; Al-Jaish 62'	Report		Stadium: Al-Sadd Stadium; Attendance: 10,000

4 April 2000 2000 AFC Asian Cup qualification	Qatar	5–0	Pakistan	Doha, Qatar
	Nazmi 25' (pen.), 85' (pen.); Al Kuwari 51', 73'; Hassan 68'	Report		Stadium: Al-Sadd Stadium; Attendance: 11,000

6 April 2000 2000 AFC Asian Cup qualification	Pakistan	0–5	Jordan	Doha, Qatar
		Report	Al-Sheikh 6'; Abu Raba 11'; Hamarsheh 13', 34'; Al-Khatib 80'	Stadium: Al-Sadd Stadium; Attendance: 8,000

8 April 2000 2000 AFC Asian Cup qualification	Pakistan	0–4	Kazakhstan	Doha, Qatar
		Report	Zubarev 21', 43'; Kucheryavykh 60'; Klishin 72'	Stadium: Al-Sadd Stadium; Attendance: 8,000

=== 2001 ===
13 May 2001 2002 FIFA World Cup qualification	Lebanon	6–0	Pakistan	Beirut, Lebanon
18:00 AST	Zein 6', 32', 88'; Hojeij 49'; Santos 51' (pen.); Hamdan 90'	Report		Stadium: Beirut Municipal Stadium; Attendance: 5,000; Referee: Halim Abdul Hamid (Malaysia)

15 May 2001 2002 FIFA World Cup qualification	Thailand	3–0	Pakistan	Beirut, Lebanon
18:00 AST	Piturat 35', 52'; Chaiman 86'	Report		Stadium: Beirut Municipal Stadium; Attendance: 1,000; Referee: Sabah Kasim (Iraq)

17 May 2001 2002 FIFA World Cup qualification	Pakistan	3–3	Sri Lanka	Beirut, Lebanon
18:00 AST	Zaman 45', 80', 85'	Report	Raheem 45'; Bandanage 72'; Kassun 83'	Stadium: Beirut Municipal Stadium; Attendance: 1,000; Referee: Gong Jianping (China)

26 May 2001 2002 FIFA World Cup qualification	Pakistan	1–8	Lebanon	Bangkok, Thailand
16:00 ICT	Arshad 20'	Report	F. Antar 5'; Ghazarian 10', 60'; R. Antar 32', 42'; Santos 46', 88'; Marcílio 78'	Stadium: Suphachalasai Stadium; Attendance: 6,000; Referee: S. Kumbalingam Kennedy (Singapore)

28 May 2001 2002 FIFA World Cup qualification	Pakistan	0–6	Thailand	Bangkok, Thailand
18:30 ICT		Report	Senamuang 10', 51', 55', 74'; Siriwong 78'; Jirasirichote 83'	Stadium: Suphachalasai Stadium; Attendance: 10,000; Referee: Fareed Al-Marzouqi (United Arab Emirates)

30 May 2001 2002 FIFA World Cup qualification	Sri Lanka	3–1	Pakistan	Bangkok, Thailand
16:00 ICT	Jayasuriya 6', 48'; Bandanage 11'	Report	Arshad 9'	Stadium: Suphachalasai Stadium; Attendance: 8,000; Referee: Viktor Kolpakov (Kyrgyzstan)

=== 2002 ===
Test series of four full international matches and one additional match involving U-20 team of Sri Lanka on 21 March. The last match venue in Jaffna was rescheduled to Kalutara due to ethnic conflicts. Some sources erroneously indicate 0–0 draw on 17 March and 1–1 draw on 19 March.

17 March 2002 Friendly	Sri Lanka	1–1	Pakistan	Colombo, Sri Lanka
	Jayasuriya 71'	Report	Arshad 3'	Stadium: Sugathadasa Stadium

19 March 2002 Friendly	Sri Lanka	0–0	Pakistan	Kurunegala, Sri Lanka
		Report		Stadium: Maliga Pitiya Ground

23 March 2002 Friendly	Sri Lanka	1–0	Pakistan	Colombo, Sri Lanka
		Report		Stadium: Sugathadasa Stadium

25 March 2002 Friendly	Sri Lanka	2–1	Pakistan	Kalutara, Sri Lanka
	Bandanage 39', 69'	Report	Rasool 17' (pen.)	Stadium: Kalutara Stadium

=== 2003 ===
10 January 2003 2003 SAFF Gold Cup G.S	India	0–1	Pakistan	Dhaka, Bangladesh
19:03 KST		Report	Rasool 50'	Stadium: Bangabandhu Stadium; Referee: Tayeb Hossain (Bangladesh)

12 January 2003 2003 SAFF Gold Cup G.S	Pakistan	2–1	Sri Lanka	Dhaka, Bangladesh
	Niaz 50'; Rasool 86'	Report	Weersinghe 89'	Stadium: Bangabandhu Stadium; Referee: Ram Krishna Ghosh (Bangladesh)

14 January 2003 2003 SAFF Gold Cup G.S	Pakistan	1–0	Afghanistan	Dhaka, Bangladesh
	Rasool 9'	Report		Stadium: Bangabandhu Stadium; Referee: Ram Krishna Ghosh (Bangladesh)

18 January 2003 2003 SAFF Gold Cup S.F	Maldives	1–0	Pakistan	Dhaka, Bangladesh
	Fazeel 12'	Report		Stadium: Bangabandhu Stadium; Referee: Gurung (Nepal)

20 January 2003 2003 SAFF Gold Cup Third place	India	2–1 (a.s.d.e.t.)	Pakistan	Dhaka, Bangladesh
	Vijayan 56'; Jadav 99'	Report	Rasool 66'	Stadium: Bangabandhu Stadium; Referee: Hasan (Bangladesh)

21 March 2003 2004 AFC Asian Cup qualification	Macau	0–3	Pakistan	Kallang, Singapore
		Report	Ahmed 27', 65'; Rasool 51'	Stadium: Jalan Besar Stadium

25 March 2003 2004 AFC Asian Cup qualification	Pakistan	0–3	Singapore	Kallang, Singapore
		Report	Daud 8', 35'; Shah 66'	Stadium: Jalan Besar Stadium

29 November 2003 2006 FIFA World Cup qualification	Pakistan	0–2	Kyrgyzstan	Karachi, Pakistan
15:00 PST		(Report)	Boldygin 36'; Chikishev 59'	Stadium: People's Football Stadium; Attendance: 10,000; Referee: Ibrahim Nesar (Bangladesh)

3 December 2003 2006 FIFA World Cup qualification	Kyrgyzstan	4–0	Pakistan	Bishkek, Kyrgyzstan
13:00 KG	Chikishev 18'; Chertkov 28'; Boldygin 67'; Krasnov 92'	(Report)		Stadium: Spartak Stadium; Attendance: 12,000

=== 2005 ===
13 April 2005 2005 Islamic Solidarity Games	Pakistan	0–2	Malaysia	Ta'if, Saudi Arabia
		Report	Saari 71', 73'	Stadium: King Fahd Stadium

12 June 2005 Friendly	Pakistan	1–1	India	Quetta, Pakistan
17:00 PST	Essa 78'	Report	Chhetri 65'	Stadium: Ayub National Stadium; Attendance: 20,000

16 June 2005 Friendly	Pakistan	0–1	India	Peshawar, Pakistan
20:30 PST		Report	MA Abdul Hakkim 67'	Stadium: Qayyum Stadium; Attendance: 15,000

18 June 2005 Friendly	Pakistan	3–0	India	Lahore, Pakistan
20:30 PST	Essa 2'; Ahmed 45+1'; Mehmood 46'	Report		Stadium: Punjab Stadium; Attendance: 11,000

7 December 2005 2005 SAFF Gold Cup	Pakistan	1–0	Sri Lanka	Karachi, Pakistan
	Hussain 38'	Report		Stadium: Peoples Football Stadium

9 December 2005 2005 SAFF Gold Cup	Pakistan	1–0	Afghanistan	Karachi, Pakistan
	Essa 55'	Report		Stadium: Peoples Football Stadium

11 December 2005 2005 SAFF Gold Cup	Pakistan	0–0	Maldives	Karachi, Pakistan
		Report		Stadium: Peoples Football Stadium

14 December 2005 2005 SAFF Gold Cup	Bangladesh	1–0	Pakistan	Karachi, Pakistan
	Sujan 44' (pen.)	Report		Stadium: Peoples Football Stadium

22 December 2005 2007 AFC Asian Cup qualification	Bangladesh	0–0	Pakistan	Dhaka, Bangladesh
		Report		Stadium: Bangabandhu National Stadium; Attendance: 5,000; Referee: Rizwan Ul Haq (India)

26 December 2005 2007 AFC Asian Cup qualification	Pakistan	0–1	Bangladesh	Karachi, Pakistan
		Report	Titu 84'	Stadium: People's Football Stadium

=== 2006 ===
18 February 2006 Friendly	Palestine	3–0	Pakistan	Riffa, Bahrain
	Attal 55', 75'; Salem 85'	Report		Stadium: Bahrain National Stadium

22 February 2006 2007 AFC Asian Cup qualification	Jordan	3–0	Pakistan	Amman, Jordan
18:00 AST	Aqel 30' (pen.); Shelbaieh 38'; Al-Shagran 41'	(Report)		Stadium: International Stadium; Attendance: 5,000; Referee: Muhsen Basma (Syria)

1 March 2006 2007 AFC Asian Cup qualification	Pakistan	1–4	United Arab Emirates	Karachi, Pakistan
21:00 AST	Essa 60'	(Report)	Qassim 68'; Matar 78'; Saad 81'; Al Kas 88'	Stadium: People's Football Stadium; Attendance: 10,000; Referee: Satop Tongkhan (Thailand)

2 April 2006 2006 AFC Challenge Cup	Kyrgyzstan	0–1	Pakistan	Dhaka, Bangladesh
18:00 BST		Report	Essa 59'	Stadium: Bangabandhu Stadium; Attendance: 2,500; Referee: Tayeb Shamsuzzaman (Bangladesh)

4 April 2006 2006 AFC Challenge Cup	Pakistan	0–2	Tajikistan	Dhaka, Bangladesh
15:30 BST		Report	Hakimov 14'; Irgashev 20'	Stadium: Bangabandhu Stadium; Attendance: 5,000; Referee: Tan Hai (China PR)

6 April 2006 2006 AFC Challenge Cup	Pakistan	2–2	Macau	Dhaka, Bangladesh
16:00 BST	Adeel 12'; Essa 43'	Report	Seng 16', 52'	Stadium: Bangabandhu Stadium; Attendance: 1,000; Referee: Tayeb Shamsuzzaman (Bangladesh)

16 August 2006 2007 AFC Asian Cup qualification	Pakistan	1–4	Oman	Islamabad, Pakistan
19:00 AST	Essa 79' (pen.)	(Report)	Al-Maimani, 35'; Al Hosni 27'; Sulaiman 90'	Stadium: Jinnah Sports Stadium; Attendance: 4,000; Referee: Mohsen Torky (Iran)

6 September 2006 2007 AFC Asian Cup qualification	Oman	5–0	Pakistan	Muscat, Oman
20:00 AST	Al Hosni 7'; Bashir 35', 85'; Sulaiman 45'; Al-Touqi 88'	(Report)		Stadium: Sultan Qaboos Sports Complex; Attendance: 10,000; Referee: Ala Abdul Kadir Nema (Iraq)

11 October 2006 2007 AFC Asian Cup qualification	Pakistan	0–3	Jordan	Lahore, Pakistan
21:00 AST		(Report)	Al-Maharmeh 16'; Ali 37'; Saad 85'	Stadium: Punjab Stadium; Attendance: 4,000; Referee: Dilovar Orzuev (Tajikistan)

15 November 2006 2007 AFC Asian Cup qualification	United Arab Emirates	3–2	Pakistan	Abu Dhabi, United Arab Emirates
18:00 AST	Abbas 54'; Omer 58', 73'	(Report)	Akram 23'; Ahmed 67'	Stadium: Al Jazira Mohammed Bin Zayed Stadium; Attendance: 6,000; Referee: Subrata Sarkar (India)

=== 2007 ===
22 October 2007 2010 FIFA World Cup qualification	Pakistan	0–7	Iraq	Lahore, Pakistan
19:30 PST		Report	Akram 19'; M. Karim 24', 49', 88', 90'; Ghulam 71'; Mohammed 83'	Stadium: Punjab Stadium; Attendance: 2,500; Referee: Kadyrbek Chynybekov (Kyrgyzstan)

28 October 2007 2010 FIFA World Cup qualification	Iraq	0–0	Pakistan	Damascus, Syria
14:00 AST		Report		Stadium: Abbasiyyin Stadium; Attendance: 8,000; Referee: Saad Al Fadhli (Kuwait)

=== 2008 ===
25 March 2008 Friendly	Nepal	2–1	Pakistan	Pokhara, Nepal
	Khawas 77'; Gurung 85'	Report	Essa 21'	Stadium: Pokhara Rangasala

27 March 2008 Friendly	Nepal	0–2	Pakistan	Pokhara, Nepal
		Report	Qasim 46'; Rasool 90'	Stadium: Pokhara Rangasala

2 April 2008 2008 AFC Challenge Cup qualification	Chinese Taipei	1–2	Pakistan	Taipei, Chinese Taipei
	Lo Chih-an 5'	Report	Essa 13'; Masih 34'	Stadium: Chungshan Stadium; Attendance: 800; Referee: Masaaki Toma (Japan)

4 April 2008 2008 AFC Challenge Cup qualification	Pakistan	1–7	Sri Lanka	Taipei, Chinese Taipei
	A. Ahmed 17'	Report	Jayasuriya 7', 42', 90+2'; Bandanage 13' (pen.), 82'; Dehiwalage 72', 77'	Stadium: Chungshan Stadium; Attendance: 300; Referee: Valentin Kovalenko (Uzbekistan)

6 April 2008 2008 AFC Challenge Cup qualification	Pakistan	9–2	Guam	Taipei, Chinese Taipei
	Anwar 9', 18'; Shah 28'; Qasim 44', 72', 82'; T. Ahmed 62'; Hameed 65' (pen.); Rehman 85'	Report	Pangelinan 74'; I. Ahmed 80' (o.g.)	Stadium: Chungshan Stadium; Attendance: 200; Referee: Kadhum Auda Lazim (Iraq)

3 June 2008 2008 SAFF Championship	Maldives	3–0	Pakistan	Malé, Maldives
	Shifan 45+2'; Thoriq 47'; Akram 90+' (o.g.)	Report		Stadium: Rasmee Dhandu Stadium

5 June 2008 2008 SAFF Championship	India	2–1	Pakistan	Malé, Maldives
	Pradeep 25'; Dias 45+1'	Report	Adnan Ahmed 88'	Stadium: Rasmee Dhandu Stadium

7 June 2008 2008 SAFF Championship	Pakistan	1–4	Nepal	Malé, Maldives
	Ishaq 52'	Report	Tamang 3'; Rayamajhi 5'; Rai 67', 86'	Stadium: Rasmee Dhandu Stadium

10 October 2008 Friendly	Malaysia	4–1	Pakistan	Kuala Lumpur, Malaysia
	Safee 42'; Zaquan 60'; Hairuddin 70'; Khyril 81'	Report	Mehmood 85'	Stadium: Bukit Jalil National Stadium

=== 2009 ===
11 March 2009 2009 ANFA Cup	Nepal	1–0	Pakistan	Kathmandu, Nepal
	Imran 67' (o.g.)	Report		Stadium: Dasharath Rangasala

4 April 2009 2010 AFC Challenge Cup qualification	Pakistan	1–1	Chinese Taipei	Colombo, Sri Lanka
	A. Ahmed 53'	Report	Chang Han 21'	Stadium: Sugathadasa Stadium; Attendance: 400; Referee: Vladislav Tseytlin (Uzbekistan)

6 April 2009 2010 AFC Challenge Cup qualification	Brunei	0–6	Pakistan	Colombo, Sri Lanka
		Report	S. Khan 19', 61', 68', 78'; J. Khan 31'; A. Ahmed 84'	Stadium: Sugathadasa Stadium; Attendance: 200; Referee: Dilovarshokh Orzuev (Tajikistan)

8 April 2009 2010 AFC Challenge Cup qualification	Sri Lanka	2–2	Pakistan	Colombo, Sri Lanka
	Ruwanthilake 2'; S. Sanjeev 88'	Report	S. Khan 82'; Bashir 84'	Stadium: Sugathadasa Stadium; Attendance: 3,000; Referee: Vladislav Tseytlin (Uzbekistan)

4 December 2009 2009 SAFF Championship	Sri Lanka	1–0	Pakistan	Dhaka, Bangladesh
	Chathura 23'	Report		Stadium: Bangabandhu National Stadium

6 December 2009 2009 SAFF Championship	Bangladesh	0–0	Pakistan	Dhaka, Bangladesh
		Report		Stadium: Bangabandhu National Stadium

8 December 2009 2009 SAFF Championship	Pakistan	7–0	Bhutan	Dhaka, Bangladesh
	Essa 21', 54'; Ashraf 23'; Mehmood 28', 35', 66'; S. Khan 45'	Report		Stadium: Bangabandhu National Stadium
