= 2002 WAFF Championship =

2nd WAFF Championship, held in Syria in 2002

Tournament details
- Host country: Syria
- Dates: 30 August – 7 September
- Teams: 6 (from 1 confederation)
- Venue: 1 (in 1 host city)

Final positions
- Champions: Iraq (1st title)
- Runners-up: Jordan
- Third place: Iran
- Fourth place: Syria

Tournament statistics
- Matches played: 10
- Goals scored: 22 (2.2 per match)
- Top scorer(s): (Iran) Alireza Nikbakht (Iraq) Razzaq Farhan (Jordan) Muayad Salim (Syria) Anas Sari (2 goals each)

The 2002 West Asian Football Federation Championship (Arabic: 2002 بطولة اتحاد غرب آسيا لكرة القدم), was the second international association football championship for national teams from West Asia organised by the West Asian Football Federation (WAFF). Hosted by Syria, the competition ran from 30 August to 7 September 2002 and was contested by the national teams of Iran, Iraq, Jordan, Lebanon, Palestine and Syria.

The tournament began with the first matches of the group stage on 30 August 2002 and ended with the final match on 7 September 2002. The final was contested by Iraq and Jordan. After a 2–2 draw, Haidar Mahmoud scored the golden goal in extra time as Iraq won the competition for the first time.

== Background ==
The first edition of the biennial West Asian Football Federation Championship was held in Amman, Jordan in 2000. Iran were the defending champions after defeating Syria in the final.

== Format ==
Six teams took part in the competition. They were drawn into two single round robin groups of three teams. The group winners and runners-up would contest the semi-finals which would decide the teams contesting the final and the third-placed play-off.

=== Participants ===
- Iran
- Iraq
- Jordan
- Lebanon
- Palestine
- Syria (hosts)

== Venue ==
All matches were played at the Abbasiyyin Stadium in Damascus.

2002 WAFF Championship is located in Syria	Damascus
2002 WAFF Championship is located in Syria	Abbasiyyin Stadium
2002 WAFF Championship is located in Syria	Capacity: 30,000

== Group stage ==
=== Group A ===
Jordan and Iran advanced to the semi-finals.

==== Table ====
Team	Pld	W	D	L	GF	GA	GD	Pts	Qualification
Jordan	2	2	0	0	2	0	+2	6	Advance to the semi-finals
Iran	2	1	0	1	2	1	+1	3	Advance to the semi-finals
Lebanon	2	0	0	2	0	3	−3	0	

==== Matches ====
30 August 2002

Jordan	1–0	Iran
Salim 11'

Abbasiyyin Stadium, Damascus

1 September 2002

Lebanon	0–1	Jordan
		Shelbaieh 4'

Abbasiyyin Stadium, Damascus

3 September 2002

Iran	2–0	Lebanon
Nikbakht 24'; Karimi 90+2'

Abbasiyyin Stadium, Damascus

=== Group B ===
Iraq and Syria advanced to the semi-finals.

==== Table ====
Team	Pld	W	D	L	GF	GA	GD	Pts	Qualification
Iraq	2	2	0	0	3	0	+3	6	Advance to the semi-finals
Syria	2	1	0	1	2	2	0	3	Advance to the semi-finals
Palestine	2	0	0	2	1	4	−3	0	

==== Matches ====
30 August 2002

Syria	2–1	Palestine
Ibrahim 21'; Haj Moustafa 37'		Lafi 39'

Abbasiyyin Stadium, Damascus

1 September 2002

Palestine	0–2	Iraq
		Wahaib 47'; Farhan 69'

Abbasiyyin Stadium, Damascus

3 September 2002

Iraq	1–0	Syria
Kadhim 43'

Abbasiyyin Stadium, Damascus

== Semi-finals ==
Anas Al-Zboun scored the golden goal in extra time as Jordan defeated Syria and, after a goalless draw, Iraq defeated Iran 6–5 on penalties.

5 September 2002

Jordan	2–1 (a.s.d.e.t.)	Syria
Salim 38'; Al-Zboun 118'		Shehadeh 54'

Abbasiyyin Stadium, Damascus

5 September 2002

Iraq	0–0 (a.s.d.e.t.)	Iran
Penalties
Abdul-Jabar (penalty scored); Abu Al-Hail (penalty scored); Abdul-Jabar (penalty scored); Mohammed (penalty scored); Kadhim (penalty missed); Akram (penalty scored); Abbas (penalty scored)	6–5	(penalty scored) Nekounam; (penalty scored) Bakhtiarizadeh; (penalty scored) Navidkia; (penalty scored) Nosrati; (penalty missed) Nikbakht; (penalty scored) Bayatinia; (penalty missed) Azizzadeh

Abbasiyyin Stadium, Damascus

== Third-place play-off ==
After a 2–2 draw, Iran defeated Syria 4–2 on penalties to finish third.

7 September 2002

Iran	2–2 (a.s.d.e.t.)	Syria
Kameli Mofrad 59'; Nikbakht 88'		Sari 15', 89'
Penalties
Nekounam (penalty scored); Bakhtiarizadeh (penalty scored); Navidkia (penalty scored); Kazemian (penalty scored)	4–2	(penalty scored) Haj Moustafa; (penalty scored) Ibrahim; (penalty missed) Jabban

Abbasiyyin Stadium, Damascus

== Final ==
Haidar Mahmoud scored the golden goal in extra time as Iraq defeated Jordan 3–2 to win the competition.

7 September 2002

Iraq	3–2 (a.s.d.e.t.)	Jordan
Farhan 32'; Y. Mahmoud 89'; H. Mahmoud 103'		Shehdeh 2'; Amer Deeb 30'

Abbasiyyin Stadium, Damascus

== Goalscorers ==
There have been 23 goals scored in 10 matches, for an average of 2.3 goals per match.

2 goals

- (Iran) Alireza Vahedi Nikbakht
- (Iraq) Razzaq Farhan
- (Jordan) Moayad Salim
- (Syria) Anas Sari

1 goal

- (Iran) Ali Karimi
- (Iran) Jalal Kameli Mofrad
- (Iraq) Haidar Mahmoud
- (Iraq) Ahmad Kadhim
- (Iraq) Ali Wahaib
- (Iraq) Younis Mahmoud
- (Iraq) Abbas Obeid
- (Jordan) Anas Al-Zboun
- (Jordan) Amer Deeb
- (Jordan) Mustafa Shehdeh
- (Jordan) Mahmoud Shelbaieh
- (Palestine) Fadi Lafi
- (Syria) Nihad Haj Moustafa
- (Syria) Hassan Ibrahim
- (Syria) Raghdan Shehadeh
