= 2026 WAFF Championship =

10th WAFF Championship, held in 2026

بطولة اتحاد غرب آسيا لكرة القدم 2026

Tournament details
- Host country: Oman
- Dates: TBD
- Teams: 12

The 2026 West Asian Football Federation Championship will be the 10th edition of the WAFF Championship, an international tournament for member nations of the West Asian Football Federation (WAFF).

The tournament was originally scheduled for 2 to 15 January 2021, but was postponed. On 29 July 2021, the WAFF announced it would be held from 20 March to 2 April 2023 in the United Arab Emirates. However, on 6 February 2023, the UAE withdrew from hosting, prompting WAFF to postpone the event again on 26 February 2023. It was subsequently rescheduled for 2025, with a later announcement confirming WAFF's intention to hold the tournament in Oman from 9 to 18 November 2026. In June 2026, WAFF announced that the tournament had been delayed indefinitely, with a new date to be determined at a later time.

== Teams ==
For the first time, all 12 WAFF members will participate in the tournament.

=== Participants ===
Team	Appearance	Last appearance	Previous best performance
Bahrain	5th	2019	Champions (2019)
Iraq	9th	2019	Champions (2002)
Jordan	10th	2019	Runners-up (2002, 2008, 2014)
Kuwait	5th	2019	Champions (2010)
Lebanon	8th	2019	Group stage (2000, 2002, 2004, 2007, 2012, 2014, 2019)
Oman (hosts)	5th	2014	Third place (2012)
Palestine	10th	2019	Group stage (2000, 2002, 2004, 2007, 2008, 2010, 2012, 2014, 2019)
Qatar	3rd	2014	Champions (2014)
Saudi Arabia	4th	2019	Group stage (2012, 2014, 2019)
Syria	9th	2019	Champions (2012)
United Arab Emirates	1st	None	Debut
Yemen	4th	2019	Semi-finals (2010)

== See also ==
- 27th Arabian Gulf Cup
- 2026 ASEAN Championship
- 2026 SAFF Championship
