= Mo'ayyad Salim =

Iraqi-born Jordanian footballer

Personal information
- Full name: Mo'ayyad Salim Mansour
- Date of birth: 1 April 1976 (age 50)
- Place of birth: Iraq
- Height: 1.75 m (5 ft 9 in)
- Position: Forward

Youth career
- Haifa Sports Club (Baghdad)
- Al-Talaba SC
- Al-Salam FC (Baghdad)
- Haifa Sports Club (Baghdad)

Senior career*
Years	Team	Apps	(Gls)
?	Al-Jaish FC (Iraq)		
?	Shabab Al-Am'ari		
1998–2010	Al-Faisaly (Amman)		
2010–2011	Shabab Al-Am'ari		(4)
2011–2012	Hilal Al-Quds		(0)

International career^{‡}
1999–2006	Jordan	64	(17)
- * Club domestic league appearances and goals ‡ National team caps and goals as of 8 November 2026

Mo'ayyad Salim Mansour (born 1 April 1976 in Iraq) is a retired Jordanian footballer.

== Honors and participation in international tournaments ==
=== In AFC Asian Cups ===
- 2004 Asian Cup

=== In Arab Nations Cup ===
- 2002 Arab Nations Cup

=== In Pan Arab Games ===
- 1999 Pan Arab Games

=== In WAFF Championships ===
- 2000 WAFF Championship
- 2002 WAFF Championship
- 2004 WAFF Championship

== International goals ==
#	Date	Venue	Opponent	Score	Result	Competition
1	18 July 1999	Amman	Syria	4–0	Win	Friendly
2	15 March 2000	Amman	Bosnia and Herzegovina	2–1	Loss	Friendly
3	13 February 2002	Ta'Qali	Lithuania	3–0	Win	Friendly
4	30 August 2002	Damascus	Iran	1–0	Win	2002 West Asian Football Federation Championship
5	5 September 2002	Damascus	Syria	2–1 a.e.t.	Win	2002 West Asian Football Federation Championship
6	7 December 2002	Manama	Bahrain	3–0	Win	Friendly
7	12 December 2002	Manama	Syria	3–0	Win	Friendly
8	20 December 2002	Kuwait city	Sudan	2–1	Win	2002 Arab Nations Cup
9	26 August 2003	Amman	Iraq	2–1	Win	Friendly
10	5 September 2003	Tehran	Iran	4–1	Loss	2004 AFC Asian Cup qualification
11	26 September 2003	Amman	Iran	3–2	Win	2004 AFC Asian Cup qualification
12	8 October 2003	Muscat	Oman	2–1	Loss	Friendly
13	12 February 2004	Amman	Indonesia	2–1	Win	Friendly
14	31 March 2004	Amman	Qatar	1–0	Win	2006 FIFA World Cup qualification
15	21 June 2004	Tehran	Iraq	2–0	Win	2004 West Asian Football Federation Championship
16	16 November 2005	Tbilisi	Georgia	3–2	Loss	Friendly
17	21 July 2006	Amman	Iraq	2–1	Win	Friendly
18	2 September 2006	Manama	Bahrain	2–0	Win	Friendly
