= Nihad Haj Moustafa =

Syrian footballer (born 1978)

Personal information
- Date of birth: 30 November 1978 (age 47)
- Place of birth: Syria
- Position: Midfielder

Senior career*
Years	Team	Apps	(Gls)
1998–2007	Al-Jaish SC		
2007–2010	Al-Hurriya		
2010–2011	Al-Wahda		
2011–2013	Al-Hurriya		
2014–2015	Baniyas Refinery		

International career^{‡}
1999–2011	Syria	28	(7)
- * Club domestic league appearances and goals ‡ National team caps and goals as of 11:02, 25 June 2023 (UTC)

Nihad Haj Moustafa (Arabic: نهاد حاج مصطفى; born 30 November 1978) is a former Syrian footballer who played for Syria national football team.

== Career statistics ==
=== International ===
Appearances and goals by national team and year
National team	Year	Apps	Goals
Syria	1999	2	0
Syria	2000	8	2
Syria	2001	6	4
Syria	2002	10	1
Syria	2003	2	0
Syria	2004	–	
Syria	2005	–	
Syria	2006	–	
Syria	2007	–	
Syria	2008	–	
Syria	2009	–	
Syria	2010	–	
Syria	2011	1	0
Total		29	7

Scores and results list Syria's goal tally first, score column indicates score after each Moustafa goal.

List of international goals scored by Nihad Haj Moustafa
No.	Date	Venue	Opponent	Score	Result	Competition
1	13 April 2000	Azadi Stadium, Tehran, Iran	Bahrain	1–0	1–0	2000 AFC Asian Cup qualification
2	26 May 2000	King Abdullah II Stadium, Amman, Jordan	Kazakhstan	3–0	4–0	2000 WAFF Championship
3	30 April 2001	Al-Hamadaniah Stadium, Aleppo, Syria	Philippines	5–0	12–0	2002 FIFA World Cup qualification
4	7 May 2001	Al-Hamadaniah Stadium, Aleppo, Syria	Laos	8–0	11–0	2002 FIFA World Cup qualification
5	11 May 2002	Al-Hamadaniah Stadium, Aleppo, Syria	Laos	1–0	9–0	2002 FIFA World Cup qualification
6	11 May 2002	Al-Hamadaniah Stadium, Aleppo, Syria	Laos	5–0	9–0	2002 FIFA World Cup qualification
7	30 August 2002	Abbasiyyin Stadium, Damascus, Syria	Palestine	2–1	2–1	2002 WAFF Championship
