= Bashar Srour =

Syrian footballer

Personal information
- Date of birth: 30 November 1972 (age 53)
- Place of birth: Syria
- Position: Defender

Senior career*
Years	Team	Apps	(Gls)
1999–2005	Hutteen		
2005–2006	Tishreen		

International career
1993–2002	Syria	31	(10)
- * Club domestic league appearances and goals

Bashar Srour (Arabic: بشار سرور; born 30 November 1972) is a former Syrian footballer who played for Syria national football team.

== Career statistics ==
=== International ===
Bashar Srour - National Team Statistics
Season	Age	Squad	Playing Time		Performance				Per 90 Minutes
2002	30	Syria	Matches Played	Starts	Goals	Assists	Non-Penalty Goals	Penalty Kicks Made	Goals
1 Season	1 Club	1 League	6	6	7	0	6	1	1.17

Scores and results list Syria's goal tally first, score column indicates score after each Srour goal.

List of international goals scored by Bashar Srour
No.	Date	Venue	Opponent	Score	Result	Competition
1	4 June 1997	Abbasiyyin Stadium, Damascus, Syria	Maldives	5–0	12–0	1998 FIFA World Cup qualification
2	4 April 2000	Al-Hamadaniah Stadium, Aleppo, Syria	Maldives	3–0	6–0	2000 AFC Asian Cup qualification
3	23 September 2000	Prince Faisal bin Fahd Stadium, Riyadh, Saudi Arabia	Saudi Arabia	1–2	1–2	Friendly
4	30 April 2001	Al-Hamadaniah Stadium, Aleppo, Syria	Philippines	4–0	12–0	2002 FIFA World Cup qualification
5	4 May 2001	Al-Hamadaniah Stadium, Aleppo, Syria	Philippines	1–0	5–1	2002 FIFA World Cup qualification
6	4 May 2001	Al-Hamadaniah Stadium, Aleppo, Syria	Philippines	2–0	5–1	2002 FIFA World Cup qualification
7	7 May 2001	Al-Hamadaniah Stadium, Aleppo, Syria	Laos	6–0	2–2	2002 FIFA World Cup qualification
8	7 May 2001	Al-Hamadaniah Stadium, Aleppo, Syria	Laos	7–0	2–2	2002 FIFA World Cup qualification
9	11 May 2001	Al-Hamadaniah Stadium, Aleppo, Syria	Laos	2–0	9–0	2002 FIFA World Cup qualification
10	18 May 2001	Al-Hamadaniah Stadium, Aleppo, Syria	Oman	3–2	3–3	2002 FIFA World Cup qualification
