= Georgi Georgiev (footballer, born 1970) =

Bulgarian footballer

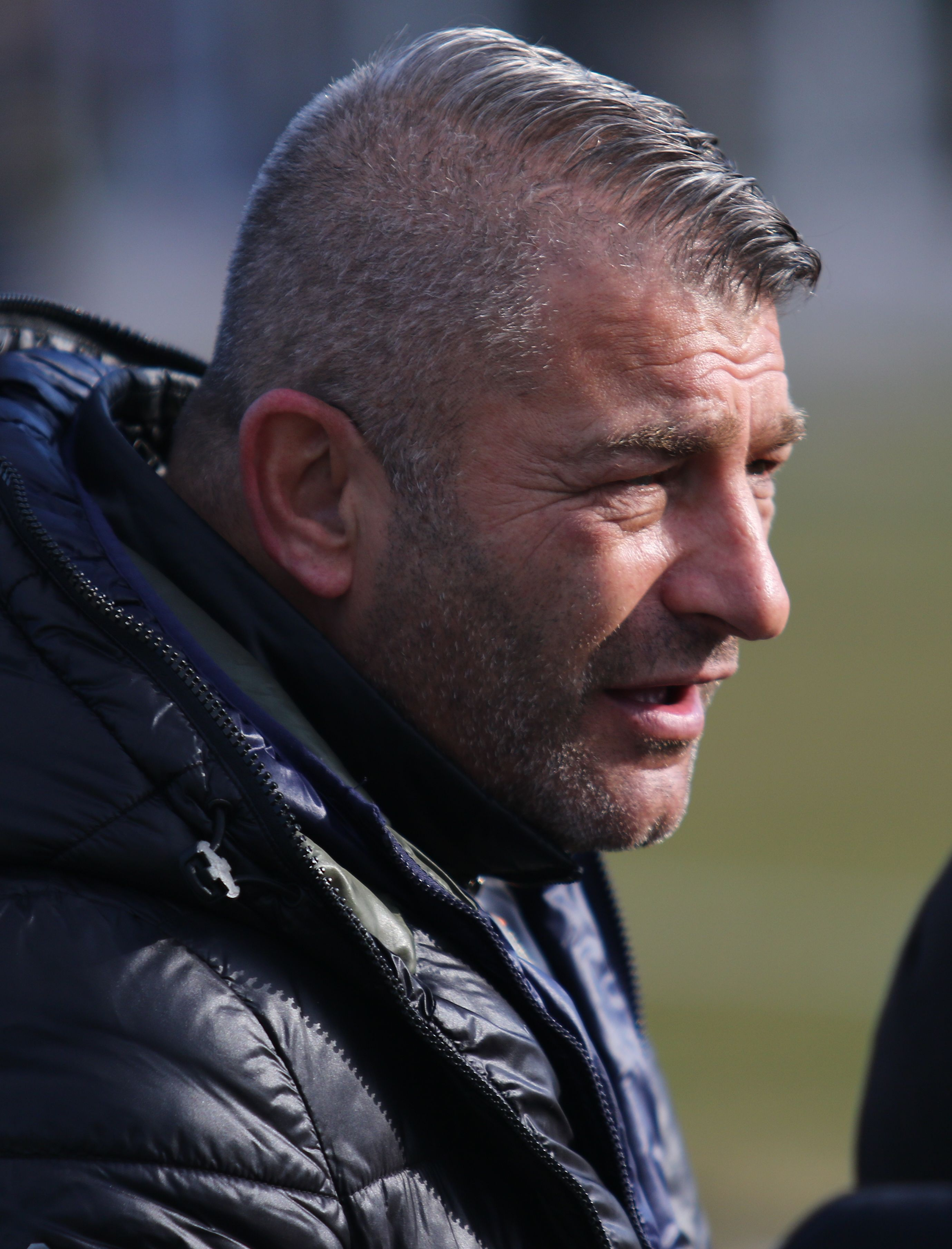

Personal information
- Full name: Georgi Kirilov Georgiev
- Date of birth: 11 August 1970 (age 56)
- Place of birth: Blagoevgrad, Bulgaria
- Height: 1.77 m (5 ft 10 in)
- Position: Forward

Senior career*
Years	Team	Apps	(Gls)
1988–1993	Pirin Blagoevgrad		
1993–1995	Chernomorets Burgas		
1995–1996	Volov Shumen		
1996–1997	Chardafon Gabrovo		
1997–1999	Minyor Pernik	47	(20)
1999–2000	Levski Sofia	19	(6)
2000	Slavia Sofia	8	(6)
2001–2002	Spartak Pleven	30	(6)
2002–2003	Apollon Smyrnis	25	(9)
2003	Panserraikos	8	(3)
2004	Vidima-Rakovski	6	(4)
2004–2005	Spartak Pleven	26	(24)
2005–2006	Vyzas	6	(0)
2006–2007	Kaliakra Kavarna	14	(13)
2007	Minyor Pernik	4	(0)
2008	Lokomotiv Mezdra	9	(2)
Total		205	(94)

International career
2001	Uzbekistan	5	(2)
- * Club domestic league appearances and goals

Georgi Georgiev (Bulgarian: Георги Георгиев) (born 11 August 1970) is a former Bulgarian-born Uzbekistani footballer who played as a forward.

== Career ==
Born in Bulgaria, Georgiev was one of several foreign-born players to represent the Uzbekistan national football team in 2002 FIFA World Cup qualifying. He scored on his debut, a 7–0 victory against Taiwan on 23 April 2001.

=== International goals ===
Scores and results list Uzbekistan's goal tally first.

No	Date	Venue	Opponent	Score	Result	Competition
1.	23 April 2001	Pakhtakor Markaziy Stadium, Tashkent, Uzbekistan	Chinese Taipei	5–0	7–0	2002 FIFA World Cup qualification
2.	3 May 2001	King Malek Hussein Sports Complex, Amman, Jordan	Turkmenistan	5–2	5–2	2002 FIFA World Cup qualification
