= Naser Al-Sohi =

Kuwaiti footballer

Naser al-Sohi
Personal information
- Full name: Naser Amer al-Sohi
- Date of birth: 24 August 1974
- Place of birth: Kuwait
- Date of death: 28 July 2004 (aged 29)
- Place of death: Kuwait City, Kuwait
- Position: Midfielder

Senior career*
Years	Team	Apps	(Gls)
1991–2004	Al-Tadamon Farwaniya		(23)
1995	→ Dynamo Kyiv	1	(0)
1995	→ Dynamo-2 Kyiv	1	(0)
2001-2002	Al-Arabi (loan)	6	(1)
2002	Al-Najma (loan)		

International career
1994–2001	Kuwait	24	(1)
- * Club domestic league appearances and goals

Naser al-Sohi (born 24 August 1974 – 28 July 2004) was a retired Kuwait international footballer who played as a midfielder.

== Career ==
Al-Sohi was the first Arab footballer to play in the Ukrainian Premier League. FC Dynamo Kyiv had sent a scout to the 1995 FIFA World Youth Championship finals in Qatar, and after the scout made a stop in Kuwait, the club took al-Sohi on trial. During his trial, al-Sohi made one Premier League appearance entering as a substitute against MFC Mykolaiv in June 1995. His Kuwaiti club offered to loan the player to Dynamo on a six-month loan for $500,000, but Dynamo ultimately declined.

Al-Sohi made several appearances for the Kuwait national football team, including a 2002 FIFA World Cup qualifier against Bahrain on 3 February 2001. He also played for Kuwait at the 2000 AFC Asian Cup finals in Lebanon.

== Career statistics ==
=== International ===
Appearances and goals by national team and year
National team	Year	Apps	Goals
Kuwait	1994	6	0
Kuwait	1995	1	0
Kuwait	1996	2	0
Kuwait	1997	7	0
Kuwait	1998	–	
Kuwait	1999	–	
Kuwait	2000	3	0
Kuwait	2001	5	1
Total		24	1

Scores and results list Kuwait's goal tally first, score column indicates score after each Al-Sohi goal.

List of international goals scored by Naser Al-Sohi
No.	Date	Venue	Opponent	Score	Result	Competition
1	3 February 2001	National Stadium, Kallang, Singapore	Bahrain	2–0	2–1	2002 FIFA World Cup qualification
