= Denis Knitel =

Tajikistani footballer

Personal information
- Full name: Denis Aleksandrovich Knitel
- Date of birth: 29 November 1977 (age 48)
- Place of birth: Dushanbe, Tajik SSR
- Height: 1.80 m (5 ft 11 in)
- Position: Defender

Senior career*
Years	Team	Apps	(Gls)
1996	Sitora Dushanbe	8	(1)
1998–2000	Varzob Dushanbe		
2001–2002	Zhemchuzhina Sochi	29	(1)
2002	Kuzbass-Dynamo Kemerovo	11	(0)
2003–2008	Spartak Shchyolkovo	117	(4)

International career
2000–2003	Tajikistan	11	(1)
- * Club domestic league appearances and goals as of 1 January 2009

Denis Aleksandrovich Knitel (Russian: Денис Александрович Книтель; born 29 November 1977) is a Tajikistani professional footballer who also holds Russian citizenship.

== Career statistics ==
=== International ===
Tajikistan national team
Year	Apps	Goals
2000	2	1
2001	0	0
2002	0	0
2003	8	0
2004	1	0
Total	11	1

Statistics accurate as of 8 September 2016

=== International goals ===
Scores and results list Tajikistan's goal tally first.

#	Date	Venue	Opponent	Score	Result	Competition	Ref.
1.	26 November 2000	Takhti Stadium, Tabriz, Iran	Guam	4–0	16–0	2002 FIFA World Cup qualification	

== Honours ==
Varzob Dushanbe

- Tajik League (3): 1998, 1999, 2000
- Tajik Cup (1): 1999
