= Taqi Mubarak Al-Siyabi =

Omani footballer (born 1978)

Taqi Mubarak
Personal information
- Full name: Taqi Mubarak Al-Siyabi
- Date of birth: 20 August 1978 (age 48)
- Place of birth: Oman
- Position: Midfielder

Senior career*
Years	Team	Apps	(Gls)
1996–2013	Muscat		

International career
1996–2002	Oman	50	(6)
- * Club domestic league appearances and goals

Taqi Mubarak Al-Siyabi commonly known as Taqi Mubarak (Arabic: تقي مبارك السيابي; born 20 August 1978) is an Omani footballer who plays for Muscat Club. He represented the national team in 2002 FIFA World Cup qualification matches.

== International career ==
Taqi was part of the first team squad of the Oman national football team till 2002. He was selected for the national team for the first time in 1996. He has made fourteen appearances in the 2002 FIFA World Cup qualification.

== Career statistics ==
=== International ===
Appearances and goals by national team and year
National team	Year	Apps	Goals
Oman	1996	5	1
Oman	1997	5	0
Oman	1998	8	1
Oman	1999	4	0
Oman	2000	5	1
Oman	2001	17	4
Oman	2002	6	0
Total		50	6

Scores and results list Oman's goal tally first, score column indicates score after each Al-Siyabi goal.

List of international goals scored by Taqi Mubarak Al-Siyabi
No.	Date	Venue	Opponent	Score	Result	Competition
1	5 September 1996	Beirut Municipal Stadium, Beirut, Lebanon	Lebanon	2–1	2–1	Friendly
2	31 October 1998	Bahrain National Stadium, Riffa, Bahrain	Qatar	2–1	2–1	14th Arabian Gulf Cup
3	30 April 2001	Sultan Qaboos Sports Complex, Muscat, Oman	Laos	2–0	12–0	2002 FIFA World Cup qualification
4	4 May 2001	Sultan Qaboos Sports Complex, Muscat, Oman	Laos	2–0	7–0	2002 FIFA World Cup qualification
5	25 May 2001	Sultan Qaboos Sports Complex, Muscat, Oman	Syria	1–0	2–0	2002 FIFA World Cup qualification
6	19 October 2001	Sheikh Zayed Stadium, Abu Dhabi, United Arab Emirates	United Arab Emirates	1–0	2–2	2002 FIFA World Cup qualification
