= Kuwait National Stadium =

Multi-purpose stadium in Kuwait City

Coordinates: 29°20′34.18″N 47°57′8.05″E

The Kuwait National Stadium is a multi-purpose stadium in Kuwait City, Kuwait. It is used mostly for football matches. The stadium has a seating capacity of 16,000 people. It was the former home ground of the Kuwait national football team until they moved to the Jaber Al-Ahmad International Stadium.
