= Essam Abu Touk =

Jordanian footballer

Essam Abu Touq
Personal information
- Date of birth: September 19, 1977 (age 49)
- Place of birth: Jordan
- Position: Attacking midfielder

Senior career*
Years	Team	Apps	(Gls)
2002–2004	Al-Qadisiyah		
2004–2009	Shabab Al-Ordon		
2009–2010	Al-Baqa'a		
2010	Ain Karem		

International career
2000-2002	Jordan	14	(5)
- * Club domestic league appearances and goals

Essam Abu Touq (born September 19, 1977) is a retired Jordanian footballer who currently coaches the football team of the American University of Sharjah.

== International goals ==
#	Date	Venue	Opponent	Score	Result	Competition
1	April 27, 2001	Tashkent	Uzbekistan	2–2	Draw	2002 FIFA World Cup qualification
2	May 3, 2001	Amman	Chinese Taipei	6–0	Win	2002 FIFA World Cup qualification (2 goals)
3	May 5, 2001	Amman	Turkmenistan	2–1	Loss	2002 FIFA World Cup qualification
4	May 7, 2001	Amman	Uzbekistan	1–1	Draw	2002 FIFA World Cup qualification
