= Ali Asel =

Kuwaiti footballer

Personal information
- Full name: Ali Abdulreda Asel
- Date of birth: 28 September 1976 (age 50)
- Place of birth: Kuwait
- Height: 1.78 m (5 ft 10 in)
- Position: Defender

Senior career*
Years	Team	Apps	(Gls)
1997–2006	Al-Salmiya SC		
2006–2008	Kazma SC		

International career
1998–2005	Kuwait	60	(5)
- * Club domestic league appearances and goals

Ali Abdulreda Asel (born 28 September 1976) is a former Kuwaiti footballer who represented Kuwait at the 2004 AFC Asian Cup.

== International statistics ==
Kuwait national team
Year	Apps	Goals
1998	9	0
2000	3	0
2001	2	1
2002	3	0
2003	13	2
2004	21	1
2005	9	1
Total	60	5
