= Anas Sari =

Syrian footballer (born 1977)

Personal information
- Date of birth: 5 April 1977 (age 49)
- Place of birth: Syria
- Height: 1.75 m (5 ft 9 in)
- Position: Striker

Senior career*
Years	Team	Apps	(Gls)
1997–1999	Al-Ittihad		
1999–2001	Homenetmen Beirut		
2001–2007	Al-Ittihad		
2007–2008	Nawair		
2008–2009	Al-Ittihad		
2009–2010	Al-Shorta		

International career
- Syria
- * Club domestic league appearances and goals

Anas Sari (Arabic: أنس صاري; born 5 April 1977) is a former Syrian footballer who played for Syria national football team.
