= Jimmy Doña =

Filipino association football player

Personal information
- Full name: Jimmy Alviola Doña
- Date of birth: 10 May 1978 (age 48)
- Place of birth: Cotabato, Philippines
- Height: 5 ft 7 in (1.70 m)
- Position: Forward

Senior career*
Years	Team	Apps	(Gls)
2003-2011	Philippine Navy FC		

International career
1999–2002	Philippines	11	(1)
- * Club domestic league appearances and goals

Jimmy Alviola Doña was a former Philippine international footballer who played as a striker. He was part of the Philippine squads that participated at the 1999 Southeast Asian Games, 2000 AFF Championship, 2000 AFC Asian Cup qualification, and 2002 FIFA World Cup qualifiers.

== International goals ==
Scores and results list the Philippines' goal tally first.

#	Date	Venue	Opponent	Score	Result	Competition
1.	26 May 2001	PhilSports Complex, Pasig	Laos	1–0	1–1	2002 FIFA World Cup qualification
