= Fadi Lafi =

Palestinian footballer (born 1979)

Personal information
- Full name: Fadi Lafi Abu Lattifa
- Date of birth: 23 March 1979 (age 47)
- Place of birth: Saudi Arabia
- Position: Forward

Team information
- Current team: Hilal Al-Quds

Youth career
- Markaz Shabab Qalandia

Senior career*
Years	Team	Apps	(Gls)
1997–2000	Hilal Al-Quds		
2000–2002	Al-Wahdat SC		
2002–2008	Al-Faisaly (Amman)		
2003–	Hilal Al-Quds		
2005–2010	Shabab Al-Ordon		
2007	Riffa S.C.		
2009	East Riffa Club		
2012	Al-Jazeera (Amman)		

International career
1999–2009	Palestine	32	(5)
- * Club domestic league appearances and goals

Fadi Lafi Abu Lattifa (Arabic: فادي لافي; born 23 March 1979) is a Palestinian footballer, who currently plays as a forward for Hilal Al-Quds.

== International ==
=== International goals ===
Scores and results list Palestine's goal tally first.

#	Date	Venue	Opponent	Score	Result	Competition
1.	23 August 1999	King Abdullah Stadium, Amman, Jordan	United Arab Emirates	1–0	1–0	1999 Pan Arab Games
2.	26 May 2000	King Abdullah Stadium, Amman, Jordan	Iran	1–1	1–1	2000 WAFF Championship
3.	28 May 2000	King Abdullah Stadium, Amman, Jordan	Kazakhstan	1–2	2–3	2000 WAFF Championship
4.	20 March 2001	Jassim Bin Hamad Stadium, Doha, Qatar	Hong Kong	1–0	1–0	2002 FIFA World Cup qualification
5.	30 August 2002	Abbasiyyin Stadium, Damascus, Syria	Syria	1–2	1–2	2002 WAFF Championship
