= Raghdan Shehadeh =

Syrian footballer

Personal information
- Date of birth: 1 January 1977 (age 49)
- Place of birth: Syria
- Position: Midfielder

Senior career*
| Years | Team | Apps | (Gls) |
| 1998–2007 | Al-Jaish | | |
| 2007–2012 | Al-Fotuwa | | |

International career
| 2000–2002 | Syria | 21 | (3) |
- * Club domestic league appearances and goals

Raghdan Shehadeh (Arabic: رغدان شحادة; born 1 January 1977) is a former Syrian footballer who played for Syria national football team.

== Career statistics ==
=== International ===
Appearances and goals by national team and year
| National team | Year | Apps | Goals |
|---|---|---|---|
| Syria | 2000 | 6 | 0 |
| Syria | 2001 | 6 | 2 |
| Syria | 2002 | 9 | 1 |
| Total | | 21 | 3 |

Scores and results list Syria's goal tally first, score column indicates score after each Shehadeh goal.

List of international goals scored by Raghdan Shehadeh
| No. | Date | Venue | Opponent | Score | Result | Competition |
|---|---|---|---|---|---|---|
| 1 | 30 April 2001 | Al-Hamadaniah Stadium, Aleppo, Syria | Philippines | 6–0 | 12–0 | 2002 FIFA World Cup qualification |
| 2 | 11 May 2001 | Al-Hamadaniah Stadium, Aleppo, Syria | Laos | 4–0 | 9–0 | 2002 FIFA World Cup qualification |
| 3 | 5 September 2002 | Abbasiyyin Stadium, Damascus, Syria | Jordan | 1–1 | 1–2 | 2002 WAFF Championship |
