= Muhammad Arshad (footballer, born 1976) =

Pakistani footballer (born 1976)

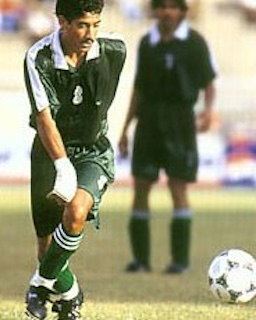
- Arshad with Pakistan during the 1997 SAFF Gold Cup

Personal information
- Full name: Muhammad Arshad Jan
- Date of birth: 10 October 1976 (age 50)
- Place of birth: Peshawar, Pakistan
- Position: Midfielder

Senior career*
Years	Team	Apps	(Gls)
1993–2009	Pakistan Air Force		

International career
1996–2002	Pakistan		(3)
- * Club domestic league appearances and goals

Muhammad Arshad Jan (Urdu: محمد ارشد جان; born 10 October 1976), also known as Arshad Khan, is a Pakistani former footballer who played as a midfielder for Pakistan Air Force and the Pakistan national team.

== Early life ==
Arshad was born on 10 October 1976 in Peshawar. His uncles Faqir Hussain and Abdul Shakoor, cousin Najeeb Ullah Najmi, and elder brother Abdul Rahman also played football for Pakistan Air Force.

== Club career ==
Arshad represented Pakistan Air Force in the National Football Championship, and later in the Pakistan Premier League.

== International career ==
In 1996, Arshad was made part of the Pakistan national team for the first time during the 1996 AFC Asian Cup qualification. The next year, he played as a regular starter at the 1998 FIFA World Cup qualification and the 1997 SAFF Gold Cup held in Nepal, helping the team finish at the third place. After the 1999 SAFF Gold Cup, he visited Nepal again during the 1999 South Asian Games. He scored his first goal during the 2002 FIFA World Cup qualification in a 1–8 defeat against Lebanon thanks to an assist by Gohar Zaman. He again scored against Sri Lanka, in the eventual 1–3 defeat.

== Post-playing career ==
After his retirement from the game Arshad served as manager and assistant coach of Pakistan Air Force with Shahzad Anwar as head coach. After Anwar's departure he served as assistant coach under Aslam Khan. In December 2016, Arshad was approached by Sri Lanka Premier League club Air Force SC along with four players of his club during their tour to Colombo. However, the move failed to materialise due to Pakistan Football Federation failure to provide PAF with the International Transfer Certificate in time.

== Career statistics ==
=== International goals ===
Scores and results list Pakistan's goal tally first, score column indicates score after each Arshad goal.

List of international goals scored by Muhammad Arshad
No.	Date	Venue	Opponent	Score	Result	Competition
1	26 May 2001	Suphachalasai Stadium, Bangkok, Thailand	Lebanon	1–2	1–8	2002 FIFA World Cup qualification
2	30 May 2001	Suphachalasai Stadium, Bangkok, Thailand	Sri Lanka	1–1	1–3	2002 FIFA World Cup qualification
3	17 March 2002	Sugathadasa Stadium, Colombo, Sri Lanka	Sri Lanka	1–0	1–1	Friendly
