= Abdulsalam Al Ghurbani =

Yemeni footballer

Personal information
- Full name: Abdulsalam Al Ghurbani
- Date of birth: 1 December 1976 (age 49)
- Place of birth: Yemen
- Height: 1.75 m (5 ft 9 in)
- Position: Midfielder

Senior career*
Years	Team	Apps	(Gls)
1990–2007	Al-Sha'ab Ibb		

International career
2001–2004	Yemen	9	(5)
- * Club domestic league appearances and goals

Abdulsalam Al Ghurbani (Arabic: عبدالسلام الغرباني; born 1 December 1976) is a Yemeni former footballer who played as a midfielder.

== International goals ==
Al Ghurbani – goals for Yemen
#	Date	Venue	Opponent	Score	Result	Competition
1	Feb. 18, 2000	Kuwait City	Bhutan	5–0	11–2	2000 AFC Asian Cup qualifier
2	Feb. 18, 2000	Kuwait City	Bhutan	6–0	11–2	2000 AFC Asian Cup qualifier
3	April. 15, 2001	Bangalore, Bangalore	India	1–0	1–1	2002 FIFA World Cup Qualifiers
4	Apr. 27, 2001	Althawra, Sana'a	Brunei	1–0	1–0	2002 FIFA World Cup qualifier
5	May. 15, 2001	Althawra, Sana'a	United Arab Emirates	1–1	2–1	2002 FIFA World Cup qualifier

== Honours ==
=== Club ===
Al-Sha'ab Ibb

- Yemeni League: 2

2003, 2004

- Yemeni President Cup: 2

2002, 2003

- Yemeni September 26 Cup: 1

2002

== See also ==
- List of one-club men
