= Said Bayazid =

Syrian footballer (born 1977)

Personal information
- Full name: Said Bayazid
- Date of birth: 20 January 1977 (age 49)
- Place of birth: Syria
- Position: Forward

Senior career*
Years	Team	Apps	(Gls)
1997–1999	Al-Jaish		
1999–2002	Proodeftiki	71	(16)
2002–2004	Akratitos	29	(2)
2004–2005	Hutteen		
2005–2006	Proodeftiki	21	(2)
2006–2009	Hutteen		
2009–2010	Al-Jaish		

International career
1997–2001	Syria	24	(24)
- * Club domestic league appearances and goals

Said Bayazid (Arabic: سيد بيازيد; born 20 January 1977) is a Syrian former professional footballer who played as a forward.

== Club career ==
Bayazid played for most of his career in Greece, including one season with Proodeftiki and two seasons with Akratitos in the Super League Greece.

== International career ==
Bayazid made several appearances for the senior Syria national football team from 1997 to 2001. He scored 11 goals in only seven qualifying matches for the FIFA World Cup.

== Career statistics ==
=== International ===
Scores and results list Syria's goal tally first.

#	Date	Venue	Opponent	Score	Result	Competition
1.	4 June 1997	Damascus, Syria	Maldives	1–0	12–0	1998 FIFA World Cup qualification
2.	4 June 1997	Damascus, Syria	Maldives	5–0	12–0	1998 FIFA World Cup qualification
3.	9 June 1997	Tehran, Iran	Maldives	5–0	12–0	1998 FIFA World Cup qualification
4.	9 June 1997	Tehran, Iran	Maldives	6–0	12–0	1998 FIFA World Cup qualification
5.	9 June 1997	Tehran, Iran	Maldives	10–0	12–0	1998 FIFA World Cup qualification
6.	13 June 1997	Tehran, Iran	Iran	2–2	2–2	1998 FIFA World Cup qualification
7.	30 April 2001	Aleppo, Syria	Philippines	1–0	12–0	2002 FIFA World Cup qualification
8.	30 April 2001	Aleppo, Syria	Philippines	2–0	12–0	2002 FIFA World Cup qualification
9.	30 April 2001	Aleppo, Syria	Philippines	7–0	12–0	2002 FIFA World Cup qualification
10.	30 April 2001	Aleppo, Syria	Philippines	10–0	12–0	2002 FIFA World Cup qualification
11.	30 April 2001	Aleppo, Syria	Philippines	11–0	12–0	2002 FIFA World Cup qualification
12.	4 May 2001	Aleppo, Syria	Philippines	3–1	5–1	2002 FIFA World Cup qualification
13.	7 May 2001	Aleppo, Syria	Laos	3–0	11–0	2002 FIFA World Cup qualification
14.	7 May 2001	Aleppo, Syria	Laos	5–0	11–0	2002 FIFA World Cup qualification
15.	7 May 2001	Aleppo, Syria	Laos	11–0	11–0	2002 FIFA World Cup qualification
16.	11 May 2001	Aleppo, Syria	Laos	3–0	9–0	2002 FIFA World Cup qualification
17.	18 May 2001	Aleppo, Syria	Oman	1–0	3–3	2002 FIFA World Cup qualification
