= 2000 WAFF Championship =

1st WAFF Championship, held in Jordan in 2000

King Hussein Cup

Tournament details
- Host country: Jordan
- Dates: 23 May – 3 June
- Teams: 8 (from 1 confederation)
- Venue: 1 (in 1 host city)

Final positions
- Champions: Iran (1st title)
- Runners-up: Syria
- Third place: Iraq
- Fourth place: Jordan

Tournament statistics
- Matches played: 16
- Goals scored: 34 (2.13 per match)
- Top scorer: (Iraq) Razzaq Farhan (5 goals)

The 2000 West Asian Football Federation Championship (Arabic: 2000 بطولة اتحاد غرب آسيا لكرة القدم), also known as the King Hussein Cup, was the inaugural international association football championship for national teams from West Asia organised by the West Asian Football Federation (WAFF). Hosted by Jordan, the competition ran from 23 May to 3 June 2000 and was contested by the national teams of Iran, Iraq, Jordan, Kazakhstan, Kyrgyzstan, Lebanon, Palestine and Syria.

The tournament began with the first matches of the group stage on 23 May 2000 and ended with the final match on 3 June 2000. The final was contested by Iran and Syria. Sohrab Bakhtiarizadeh scored the only goal of the final as Iran were crowned champions of the inaugural competition.

== Background ==
The first edition of the West Asian Football Federation Championship was held in Amman, Jordan and it was originally conceived as a biennial championship.

== Format ==
Eight teams took part in the competition. They were drawn into two single round robin groups of four teams. The group winners and runners-up would contest the semi-finals which would decide the teams contesting the final and the third-placed play-off.

=== Participants ===
- Iran
- Iraq
- Jordan
- Kazakhstan
- Kyrgyzstan
- Lebanon
- Palestine
- Syria

== Venues ==
All matches were played at the King Abdullah II Stadium in Amman.

2000 WAFF Championship (Jordan)	Amman
2000 WAFF Championship (Jordan)	King Abdullah II Stadium
2000 WAFF Championship (Jordan)	Capacity: 20,000

== Group stage ==
=== Group A ===
Iran and Syria advanced to the semi-finals.

==== Table ====
Team	Pld	W	D	L	GF	GA	GD	Pts	Qualification
Iran	3	2	1	0	5	1	+4	7	Advance to the semi-finals
Syria	3	2	0	1	5	1	+4	6	Advance to the semi-finals
Kazakhstan	3	1	0	2	3	9	−6	3	
Palestine	3	0	1	2	3	5	−2	1	

==== Matches ====
24 May 2000
17:30

Iran	3–0	Kazakhstan
Karimi 6', 73'; Hashemian 45'

King Abdullah II Stadium, Amman
Attendance: 3,500
Referee: Salem Mahmoud, Jordan
24 May 2000
20:30

Palestine	0–1	Syria
		Al Beetar 80'

King Abdullah II Stadium, Amman

26 May 2000
17:30

Kazakhstan	0–4	Syria
		Azzam 26'; Boushi 56'; Haj Moustafa 57'; Al Beetar 82'

King Abdullah II Stadium, Amman
26 May 2000
20:30

Iran	1–1	Palestine
Samereh 54'		Lafi 90+2'

King Abdullah II Stadium, Amman

28 May 2000
17:30

Palestine	2–3	Kazakhstan
Lafi 55'; Al-Faran 83'		Kadyrkulov 29', 88'; Bogatyrev 43'

King Abdullah II Stadium, Amman
28 May 2000
20:30

Iran	1–0	Syria
Karimi 60' (pen.)

King Abdullah II Stadium, Amman

=== Group B ===
Iraq and Jordan advanced to the semi-finals.

==== Table ====
Team	Pld	W	D	L	GF	GA	GD	Pts	Qualification
Iraq	3	2	1	0	6	1	+5	7	Advance to the semi-finals
Jordan	3	1	2	0	2	0	+2	5	Advance to the semi-finals
Lebanon	3	1	1	1	3	2	+1	4	
Kyrgyzstan	3	0	0	3	0	8	−8	0	

==== Matches ====
23 May 2000
17:30

Jordan	2–0	Kyrgyzstan
Abu Zema 28' (pen.); Al-Shagran 68'

King Abdullah II Stadium, Amman
23 May 2000
20:30

Iraq	2–1	Lebanon
Obeid 63' (pen.); Fawzi 66'		Zein 15'

King Abdullah II Stadium, Amman

25 May 2000
17:30

Lebanon	2–0	Kyrgyzstan
Zein 41'; Antar 76'

King Abdullah II Stadium, Amman
25 May 2000
20:30

Jordan	0–0	Iraq

King Abdullah II Stadium, Amman

27 May 2000
17:30

Iraq	4–0	Kyrgyzstan
Farhan 28', 35', 75'; Mohammed 67'

King Abdullah II Stadium, Amman
27 May 2000
20:30

Jordan	0–0	Lebanon

King Abdullah II Stadium, Amman

== Semi-finals ==
Ali Karimi scored the only goal as Iran defeated Jordan and Syria defeated Iraq 5–2 on penalties.

31 May 2000
17:30

Syria	0–0 (a.e.t.)	Iraq
Penalties
	5–3

King Abdullah II Stadium, Amman

31 May 2000
20:30

Iran	1–0	Jordan
Karimi 17'

King Abdullah II Stadium, Amman

== Third-place play-off ==
Goals from Razzaq Farhan, Ahmad Kadhim Assad and Hamza Hadi Muhsin helped Iraq win 4–1 as they finished third.

3 June 2000
17:30

Iraq	4–1	Jordan
Farhan 16', 74'; Kadhim 30'; Hadi 37'		Tadrus 48'

King Abdullah II Stadium, Amman

== Final ==
Sohrab Bakhtiarizadeh scored the only goal of the final as Iran defeated Syria to win the inaugural title.

3 June 2000
20:30

Iran	1–0	Syria
Bakhtiarizadeh 36'

King Abdullah II Stadium, Amman

== Goalscorers ==
There have been 34 goals scored in 16 matches, for an average of 2.12 goals per match.

5 goals

- (Iraq) Razzaq Farhan

4 goals

- (Iran) Ali Karimi

2 goals

- (Kazakhstan) Askhat Kadyrkulov
- (Lebanon) Haitham Zein
- (Palestine) Fadi Lafi
- (Syria) Mohannad Al-Beetar

1 goal

- (Iran) Sohrab Bakhtiarizadeh
- (Iran) Vahid Hashemian
- (Iran) Ali Samereh
- (Iraq) Hussam Fawzi
- (Iraq) Hamza Hadi
- (Iraq) Ahmad Kadhim
- (Iraq) Hesham Mohammed
- (Iraq) Abbas Obeid
- (Jordan) Abdullah Abu Zema
- (Jordan) Badran Al-Shagran
- (Jordan) Jeris Tadrus
- (Kazakhstan) Vencheslav Bogatyrev
- (Lebanon) Roda Antar
- (Palestine) Adel Al-Faran
- (Syria) Ahmad Azzam
- (Syria) Mouhanad Boushi
- (Syria) Nihad Haj Moustafa
