= Nirajan Rayamajhi =

Nepalese footballer

Personal information
- Date of birth: 29 January 1980 (age 46)
- Place of birth: Kathmandu, Nepal
- Position: Striker

Senior career*
Years	Team	Apps	(Gls)
1997–2001	Ranipokhari Corner		
2002–2003	Friends Club		
2003–2004	SC Union 03		
2004–2006	Friends Club		
2006–2015	New Road Team		

International career
1999–2010	Nepal	21	(13)
- * Club domestic league appearances and goals

Nirajan Rayamajhi (Nepali: निराजन रायमाझी; born 29 January 1980) is a Nepalese former professional footballer who played as a striker for the Nepal national football team and New Road Team (NRT). Rayamajhi is best known for his performance with the national team. He scored a hat trick for Nepal against Macau in the 2002 World Cup qualification round. He retired from Nepal's national team in 2006.

== Early life ==
Rayamajhi was born in Mulpani, Kathmandu, the capital city of Nepal. His uncle and brother played on the football grounds of Mulpani, and he used to accompany them as a child. He started to play inter-ward football and participated in local-level tournaments. His father worked in the municipality and had acquaintance with officers of Ranipokhari Corner team (RCT), which led him to join the club. He played with RCT for five years, in the Martyr's Memorial B-Division League. This led him to play in the Martyr's Memorial A-Division League. He was the top scorer in the league, resulting in his selection for the national team.

== National team ==
At age 21, he debuted for the national team. Despite losing to Iraq, he scored a consolation goal. He scored a hat-trick against Macau in the 2002 World Cup qualification round. He was in form until 2004 and was never benched. He became the top scorer for the national team.

== Club life ==
Due to his strong performance with the national team, he got the chance to play for clubs including Friends Club and Three Star Club. Rayamajhi went to Germany to play and improve his technique. He learned that FIFA does not allow players of teams with low FIFA rankings to play in upper division leagues of high-profile nations. He joined the 4th division club Ornek and played for some years. Due to financial problems, he left football and started a job.

== Return to national team ==
He returned to Nepal in 2005 and re-joined the Three Star Club. After a year, he was called up by the national team. At the same time, he joined NRT club. He couldn't regain form and finally retired from the national team after playing an international friendly against Palestine.

=== International goals ===
Scores and results list Nepal's goal tally first.

#	Date	Venue	Opponent	Score	Result	Competition
1.	12 February 2000	Mohammed Al-Hamad Stadium, Hawally, Kuwait	Bhutan	3–0	3–0	2000 AFC Asian Cup qualification
2.	14 April 2001	Al-Shaab Stadium, Baghdad	Iraq	1–4	1–9	2002 FIFA World Cup qualification
3.	16 April 2001	Al-Shaab Stadium, Baghdad	Macau	1–0	4–1	2002 FIFA World Cup qualification
4.	16 April 2001	Al-Shaab Stadium, Baghdad	Macau	3–1	4–1	2002 FIFA World Cup qualification
5.	23 April 2001	Almaty Central Stadium, Almaty	Iraq	2–4	2–4	2002 FIFA World Cup qualification
6.	25 April 2001	Almaty Central Stadium, Almaty	Macau	1–0	6–1	2002 FIFA World Cup qualification
7.	25 April 2001	Almaty Central Stadium, Almaty	Macau	2–0	6–1	2002 FIFA World Cup qualification
8.	25 April 2001	Almaty Central Stadium, Almaty	Macau	4–1	6–1	2002 FIFA World Cup qualification
9.	13 January 2003	Bangabandhu National Stadium, Dhaka	Bhutan	1–0	2–0	2003 SAFF Championship
10.	15 January 2003	Bangbandhu Stadium, Dhaka	Maldives	1–0	2–3	2003 SAFF Championship
11.	18 March 2003	Dasharath Rangasala, Kathmandu	Afghanistan	1–0	4–0	2004 AFC Asian Cup qualification
12.	18 March 2003	Dasharath Rangasala, Kathmandu	Afghanistan	4–0	4–0	2004 AFC Asian Cup qualification
13.	7 June 2008	Rasmee Dhandu Stadium, Malé	Pakistan	2–0	4–1	2008 SAFF Championship
