= Marcílio (footballer, born 1976) =

Footballer (born 1976)

Personal information
- Full name: Marcílio Alves da Silva
- Date of birth: 11 May 1976 (age 50)
- Place of birth: Rio de Janeiro, Brazil
- Height: 1.82 m (6 ft 0 in)
- Position: Defender

Senior career*
Years	Team	Apps	(Gls)
1998–1999	Bangu		
1999–2003	Akhaa Ahli Aley		
2003–2005	Olympic Beirut		
2005–2006	Sagesse		
2007–2008	Madureira Esporte Clube		
2007	→ Bangu (loan)		
2008	Bonsucesso		
2009	Atlético Tubarão		
2009–2010	CFZ Imbituba		

International career
2000–2003	Lebanon	15	(2)
- * Club domestic league appearances and goals

Marcílio Alves da Silva (born 11 May 1976), or simply Marcílio (Arabic: مارسيليو), is a former footballer who played as a defender. Born in Brazil, Marcílio is of Lebanese descent; he represented Lebanon internationally at the 2000 AFC Asian Cup.

== International career ==
Marcílio formerly represented the Lebanon national football team at the 2000 AFC Asian Cup.

== Career statistics ==
=== International ===
#	Date	Venue	Opponent	Score	Result	Competition
1	26 May 2001	Suphachalasai Stadium, Bangkok, Thailand	Pakistan	7 – 1	8 - 1	World Cup 2002 Qualifying
2	28 May 2001	Suphachalasai Stadium, Bangkok, Thailand	Sri Lanka	3 – 0	5 - 0	World Cup 2002 Qualifying

== Honours ==
Individual

- Lebanese Premier League Team of the Season: 2000–01

== See also ==
- List of Lebanon international footballers born outside Lebanon
