= Tarek Jabban =

Syrian footballer (born 1975)

Tarek Jabban طَارِق جَبَان
Personal information
- Date of birth: December 11, 1975 (age 50)
- Place of birth: Damascus, Syria
- Height: 1.80 m (5 ft 11 in)
- Position: Defender

Youth career
- Al-Majd

Senior career*
Years	Team	Apps	(Gls)
1992–1993	Al-Majd		
1994–2010	Al-Jaish		
2003	→ Al-Jahra (loan)		
2006	→ Persepolis (loan)	5	(0)

International career^{‡}
1995–2006	Syria	35	(5)
- * Club domestic league appearances and goals as of 10 July 2007 ‡ National team caps and goals as of 31 January 2007

Tarek Mohammad Hisham Jabban (Arabic: طَارِق مُحَمَّد هِشَام جَبَان; born 11 December 1975) is a Syrian former professional footballer. He last played for Al-Jaish, which competes in the Syrian Premier League, the top division in Syria. He played as a defender. He was a member and captain of the Syria national football team.

== Club career ==
Jabban started his career at Al-Majd, then he transferred to the Syrian League giants Al-Jaish.

He was loaned out two times: in 2003 played for Kuwaiti club Al-Jahra for six months, and he signed a 6-month contract with Iranian club Persepolis in 2006.

== International career ==
He was a member and captain of the Syria national football team.

== International goals ==
No.	Date	Venue	Opponent	Score	Result	Competition
1.	30 April 2001	Al-Hamadaniah Stadium, Aleppo, Syria	Philippines	3–0	12–0	2002 FIFA World Cup qualification

== Coaching career ==
He was the assistant coach at Al-Jaish, then Syria in 2018–19. He later became the head coach at Al-Jaish, Taliya and Tishreen.
