= Ahmed Kadhim =

Iraqi footballer

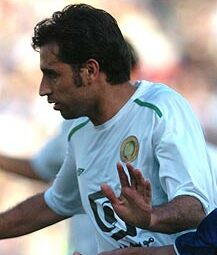

Personal information
- Full name: Ahmed Kadhim Assad
- Date of birth: 1 July 1976 (age 50)
- Place of birth: Baghdad, Iraq
- Height: 1.83 m (6 ft 0 in)
- Position: Defender

Team information
- Current team: Samarra FC (Manager)

Youth career
- 1992–1994: Al-Naft

Senior career*
Years	Team	Apps	(Gls)
1994–1995	Al-Talaba		
1995–1997	Al-Quwa Al-Jawiya		
1997–2002	Al-Zawraa		
2002–2003	Al-Shorta		
2003–2004	Al-Jaish Damascus		
2004–2007	Pas		
2007–2008	Steel Azin		
2008–2009	Esteghlal Ahvaz	24	(0)
2009–2010	Al-Shorta		
2010–2013	Al-Naft		

International career
1995–2007	Iraq	90	(6)

Managerial career
- 2018: Al-Diwaniya FC
- 2018–2019: Zakho FC
- 2019: Salam Zgharta FC
- 2020–2021: Samarra FC
- 2021–2022: Samarra FC
- 2022–2025: Iraq U17
- * Club domestic league appearances and goals

Ahmed Kadhim Assad (Arabic: احمد کاظم عصاد; born on 1 July 1976) is an Iraqi professional football manager and former player, who is the current manager of Al-Hudood.

== International career ==
He was used in a three-man defensive line-up by coach Najih Humoud but was moved to left-back by Adnan Hamad. He made his debut in a 2–0 win over Lebanon in November 1998 in Beirut.

== International goals ==
Scores and results list Iraq's goal tally first.

Date	Venue	Opponent	Score	Result	Competition
30 October 1999	Al Jazira Stadium, Abu Dhabi	Estonia	1–1	1–1	Friendly
2 June 2000	King Abdullah Stadium, Amman	Jordan	2–0	4–1	2000 WAFF Championship
12 April 2001	Al-Shaab Stadium, Baghdad	Macau	8–0	8–0	2002 FIFA World Cup qualification
14 April 2001	Al-Shaab Stadium, Baghdad	Nepal	8–1	9–1	2002 FIFA World Cup qualification
14 April 2001	Al-Shaab Stadium, Baghdad	Nepal	9–1	9–1	2002 FIFA World Cup qualification
3 September 2002	Abbasiyyin Stadium, Damascus	Syria	1–0	1-0	2002 WAFF Championship

== Managerial statistics ==
As of match played 26 December, 2021

Managerial record by team and tenure
Team	From	To	Record					Ref.
Team	From	To	P	W	D	L	Win %	Ref.
Al-Diwaniya	10 May 2018	16 June 2018	6	1	2	3	16.7	
Zakho	23 September 2018	19 July 2019	7	5	1	1	71.4	
Salam Zgharta	8 September 2019	5 October 2019	2	1	0	1	50.0	
Samarra FC	7 February 2020	26 October 2021	21	9	5	7	42.9	
Samarra FC	15 November 2021	""Present""	7	0	2	5	0.0	
Total			43	16	10	17	37.2	—
