= Samir Said =

Kuwaiti footballer (1963–2012)

Samir Saeed
Personal information
- Date of birth: 5 November 1963
- Place of birth: Kuwait
- Date of death: 15 April 2012 (aged 48)
- Place of death: Kuwait
- Position: Goalkeeper

Senior career*
Years	Team	Apps	(Gls)
1980–1996	Al-Arabi SC		

International career
1984–1992	Kuwait	75	(0)
- * Club domestic league appearances and goals

Samir Saeed (5 November 1963 – 15 April 2012) was a professional a very famous Kuwaiti football goalkeeper who played for Kuwait in the 1984 Asian Cup.

== Death ==
On April 15, 2012, he died due to injuries sustained when a car hit him. The car hit him while walking

== Honours ==
- Asian Cup:

Third Place : 1984
