= Hussein Hamdan =

Lebanese footballer and coach (1978)

Personal information
- Full name: Hussein Issam Hamdan
- Date of birth: 22 August 1978 (age 48)
- Place of birth: Beirut, Lebanon
- Height: 1.86 m (6 ft 1 in)
- Position: Right midfielder

Team information
- Current team: Akhaa Ahli Aley (head coach)

Senior career*
Years	Team	Apps	(Gls)
1995–2007	Sagesse		
2007–2009	Ansar		
2009	Sagesse		
2009–2014	Nejmeh	43	(0)

International career
2001–2007	Lebanon	7	(1)

Managerial career
- 2021–2022: Akhaa Ahli Aley (assistant)
- 2022–: Akhaa Ahli Aley
- * Club domestic league appearances and goals

Hussein Issam Hamdan (Arabic: حُسَيْن عِصَام حَمْدَان; born 22 August 1978) is a Lebanese football coach and former player who is the head coach of Lebanese Premier League club Akhaa Ahli Aley.

== Honours ==
=== Player ===
Individual

- Lebanese Premier League Team of the Season: 2006–07

=== Manager ===
Akhaa Ahli Aley

- Lebanese Challenge Cup: 2022
