= Channa Ediri Bandanage =

Sri Lankan international footballer

Personal information
- Full name: Channa Ediri Bandanage
- Date of birth: 22 September 1978 (age 48)
- Place of birth: Galle, Sri Lanka
- Position: Forward

Senior career*
Years	Team	Apps	(Gls)
2001	Hurriyya		(4)
2001–2002	Pettah United		
2002–2003	Dempo SC		
2003–2005	Pettah United		
2005	Victory		
2005–2006	Ratnam Sports Club		
2006	Negombo Youth SC		
2006	Victory		
2006–2007	Negombo Youth SC		
2007–2009	Ratnam Sports Club		
2009–2010	Maziya	11	(5)
2011	Club All Youth Linkage	6	(1)
2012	B.G. Sports Club		
2012	Ratnam Sports Club		
2013	Victory		
2015–2016	Blue Star SC		
2016–2017	Colombo FC		
2017–2018	Super Sun SC		
2018–2019	Blue Star SC		

International career
1999–2009	Sri Lanka	70	(18)
- * Club domestic league appearances and goals

Channa Ediri Bandanage (born 22 September 1978) is a Sri Lankan former international footballer who played as a forward. Bandanage has won the most number of caps for Sri Lanka national football team, and is the second leading goal scorer for Sri Lanka.

== Personal life ==
Since his retirement from football, Banadanage has been working as a gravedigger.

== Career statistics ==
=== International ===
Appearances and goals by national team and year
National team	Year	Apps	Goals
Sri Lanka	1999	2	0
Sri Lanka	2000	6	1
Sri Lanka	2001	6	2
Sri Lanka	2002	7	3
Sri Lanka	2003	14	4
Sri Lanka	2004	4	0
Sri Lanka	2006	6	0
Sri Lanka	2007	4	0
Sri Lanka	2008	8	4
Sri Lanka	2009	13	4
Total		70	18

Scores and results list Sri Lanka's goal tally first, score column indicates score after each Bandanage goal.

List of international goals scored by Channa Ediri Bandanage
No.	Date	Venue	Opponent	Score	Result	Competition	Ref.
1	7 May 2000	Galolhu Football Stadium, Malé, Maldives	Bangladesh	1-0	1-0	Friendly	
2	17 May 2001	Beirut Municipal Stadium, Beirut, Lebanon	Pakistan	2-0	3-3	2002 FIFA World Cup qualification	
3	30 May 2001	Suphachalasai Stadium, Bangkok, Thailand	Pakistan	2-1	3-1	2002 FIFA World Cup qualification	
4	25 March 2002	Kalutara Stadium, Kalutara, Sri Lanka	Pakistan	1-1	2-1	Friendly	
5	25 March 2002	Kalutara Stadium, Kalutara, Sri Lanka	Pakistan	2-1	2-1	Friendly	
6	27 November 2002	Sugathadasa Stadium, Colombo, Sri Lanka	Vietnam	1-2	1-2	Friendly	
7	21 March 2003	Sugathadasa Stadium, Colombo, Sri Lanka	Timor-Leste	2-1	3-2	2004 AFC Asian Cup qualification	
8	25 March 2003	Sugathadasa Stadium, Colombo, Sri Lanka	Taiwan	2-1	2-1	2004 AFC Asian Cup qualification	
9	18 November 2003	Maktoum bin Rashid Al Maktoum Stadium, Dubai, United Arab Emirates	United Arab Emirates	1-1	1-3	2004 AFC Asian Cup qualification	
10	3 December 2003	Sugathadasa Stadium, Colombo, Sri Lanka	Laos	1-0	3-0	2006 FIFA World Cup qualification	
11	2 April 2008	Zhongshan Sports Center Stadium, Zhongshan, China	Guam	1-0	5-1	2008 AFC Challenge Cup qualification	
12	4 April 2008	Zhongshan Sports Center Stadium, Zhongshan, China	Pakistan	2-0	7-1	2008 AFC Challenge Cup qualification	
13	4 April 2008	Zhongshan Sports Center Stadium, Zhongshan, China	Pakistan	6-1	7-1	2008 AFC Challenge Cup qualification	
14	4 June 2008	Sugathadasa Stadium, Colombo, Sri Lanka	Afghanistan	2-1	2-2	2008 SAFF Championship	
15	6 December 2009	Bangabandhu National Stadium, Dhaka, Bangladesh	Bhutan	1-0	6-0	2009 SAFF Championship	
16	6 December 2009	Bangabandhu National Stadium, Dhaka, Bangladesh	Bhutan	2-0	6-0	2009 SAFF Championship	
17	8 December 2009	Bangabandhu National Stadium, Dhaka, Bangladesh	Bangladesh	1-1	1-2	2009 SAFF Championship	
18	11 December 2009	Bangabandhu National Stadium, Dhaka, Bangladesh	Maldives	1-1	1-5	2009 SAFF Championship	

== Honours ==
Ratnam Sports Club

- Premier League: 2007–08, 2011–12

BG Sports Club

- Second Division: 2012
