= Yaqoob Juma Al-Mukhaini =

Omani footballer (born 1982)

Yaqoob Al-Mukhaini
Personal information
- Full name: Yaqoob Juma Al-Mukhaini
- Date of birth: 1 May 1982 (age 44)
- Place of birth: Oman
- Position: Striker

Senior career*
| Years | Team | Apps | (Gls) |
| 1999–2012 | Al-Orouba | | (14+) |

International career
| 2000–2011 | Oman | 23 | (12) |
- * Club domestic league appearances and goals

Yaqoob Juma Al-Mukhaini (Arabic: يعقوب جمعة المخيني; born 1 May 1982) is an Omani retired international footballer who played as a striker. He spent his entire career with Al-Orouba SC in the Omani League.

== International career ==
Yaqoob was part of the first team squad of the Oman national football team from 2000 to 2002. He was selected for the national team for the first time in 2002. He has made appearances in the 2002 FIFA World Cup qualification.

== Career statistics ==
=== Club ===
| Club | Season | Division | League | | Cup | | Continental | | Other | | Total | |
| Club | Season | Division | Apps | Goals | Apps | Goals | Apps | Goals | Apps | Goals | Apps | Goals |
|---|---|---|---|---|---|---|---|---|---|---|---|---|
| Al-Orouba | 2003–04 | Omani League | - | 6 | - | 0 | 0 | 0 | - | 0 | - | 6 |
| Al-Orouba | 2004–05 | Omani League | - | 2 | - | 0 | 0 | 0 | - | 0 | - | 2 |
| Al-Orouba | 2007–08 | Omani League | - | 2 | - | 5 | 0 | 0 | - | 0 | - | 7 |
| Al-Orouba | 2009–10 | Omani League | - | 1 | - | 2 | 0 | 0 | - | 2 | - | 5 |
| Career total | | | - | 11 | - | 7 | 0 | 0 | - | 2 | - | 20 |

=== International ===
Appearances and goals by national team and year
| National team | Year | Apps | Goals |
|---|---|---|---|
| Oman | 2000 | 3 | 1 |
| Oman | 2001 | 14 | 11 |
| Oman | 2002 | 5 | 0 |
| Oman | 2011 | 1 | 0 |
| Total | | 23 | 12 |

Scores and results list Oman's goal tally first, score column indicates score after each Al-Mukhaini goal.

List of international goals scored by Yaqoob Juma Al-Mukhaini
| No. | Date | Venue | Opponent | Score | Result | Competition | Ref. |
|---|---|---|---|---|---|---|---|
| 1 | 5 August 2000 | Khiara, Lebanon | Lebanon | 1–3 | 1–3 | Friendly | |
| 2 | 30 April 2001 | Sultan Qaboos Stadium, Muscat, Oman | Laos | 5–0 | 12–0 | 2002 FIFA World Cup qualification | |
| 3 | 30 April 2001 | Sultan Qaboos Stadium, Muscat, Oman | Laos | 6–0 | 12–0 | 2002 FIFA World Cup qualification | |
| 4 | 4 May 2001 | Sultan Qaboos Stadium, Muscat, Oman | Laos | 5–0 | 7–0 | 2002 FIFA World Cup qualification | |
| 5 | 7 May 2001 | Sultan Qaboos Stadium, Muscat, Oman | Philippines | 2–0 | 7–0 | 2002 FIFA World Cup qualification | |
| 6 | 7 May 2001 | Sultan Qaboos Stadium, Muscat, Oman | Philippines | 3–0 | 7–0 | 2002 FIFA World Cup qualification | |
| 7 | 7 May 2001 | Sultan Qaboos Stadium, Muscat, Oman | Philippines | 4–0 | 7–0 | 2002 FIFA World Cup qualification | |
| 8 | 7 May 2001 | Sultan Qaboos Stadium, Muscat, Oman | Philippines | 5–0 | 7–0 | 2002 FIFA World Cup qualification | |
| 9 | 11 May 2001 | Sultan Qaboos Stadium, Muscat, Oman | Philippines | 1–0 | 2–0 | 2002 FIFA World Cup qualification | |
| 10 | 11 May 2001 | Sultan Qaboos Stadium, Muscat, Oman | Philippines | 2–0 | 2–0 | 2002 FIFA World Cup qualification | |
| 11 | 13 October 2001 | Sultan Qaboos Stadium, Muscat, Oman | Uzbekistan | 1–2 | 4–2 | 2002 FIFA World Cup qualification | |
| 12 | 13 October 2001 | Sultan Qaboos Stadium, Muscat, Oman | Uzbekistan | 3–2 | 4–2 | 2002 FIFA World Cup qualification | |
