= Gilberto (footballer, born 1975) =

Footballer (born 1975)

Personal information
- Date of birth: 27 August 1975 (age 51)
- Place of birth: Curitiba, Paraná, Brazil
- Position: Striker

Senior career*
Years	Team	Apps	(Gls)
2000	Paraguaçuense		
2000–2002	Akhaa Ahli Aley		(21)
2002–2007	Nejmeh SC		
2007–2008	Msida Saint-Joseph		

International career
2000–2001	Lebanon	11	(7)
- * Club domestic league appearances and goals

Gilberto dos Santos (born 27 August 1975), or simply Gilberto (Arabic: جيلبرتو), is a former footballer who played as a striker. Born in Brazil, he played for the Lebanon national team at the 2000 AFC Asian Cup.

== Club career ==
Gilberto played for Akhaa Ahli Aley between 2000 and 2002, before signing for Nejmeh on 10 November 2002, scoring 31 goals for them.

On 5 November 2007, the Brazilian Football Confederation reported in its annual report of international transfers that Gilberto had transferred from Chapecoense to Maltese side Msida Saint-Joseph.

== International career ==
Born in Brazil, Gilberto is of Lebanese descent. He represented the Lebanon national football team at the 2000 AFC Asian Cup, playing in all three games, and in the World Cup 2002 Qualifying.

== Career statistics ==
=== International ===
#	Date	Venue	Opponent	Score	Result	Competition
1	13 May 2001	Beirut Municipal Stadium, Beirut, Lebanon	Pakistan	4 – 0	6 - 0	World Cup 2002 Qualifying
2	26 May 2001	Suphachalasai Stadium, Bangkok, Thailand	Pakistan	5 – 1	8 - 1	World Cup 2002 Qualifying
3	26 May 2001	Suphachalasai Stadium, Bangkok, Thailand	Pakistan	8 – 1	8 - 1	World Cup 2002 Qualifying

== See also ==
- List of Lebanon international footballers born outside Lebanon
