= 2000–01 Hamburger SV season =

Hamburger SV
2000–01 season
- Manager: Frank Pagelsdorf
- Stadium: Volksparkstadion
- Bundesliga: 13th
- DFB-Pokal: Second round
- Champions League: Group stage
- UEFA Cup: Third round
- Top goalscorer: Sergej Barbarez (22)
- Average home league attendance: 42,995
Home colours	Away colours	Third colours

The 2000–01 Hamburger SV season was the 113th season in the club's history.

== Season summary ==
Hamburg slumped from third to 13th in the final table despite the 22 goals of the league's top scorer Sergej Barbarez, but still had a major role to play in the title race. In the final game of the season faced Bayern Munich, who had been three points ahead of Schalke as the final round begun. Schalke defeated Unterhaching 5–3, with the final whistle blown while Hamburg and Bayern were still playing. With Bayern conceding the game's first goal on the stroke of second-half added time it briefly appeared that the title was heading to Gelsenkirchen. However, Hamburg goalkeeper Mathias Schober - on loan from Schalke, and only playing his third game for the club - handled a back pass and thus conceded a free kick. After much delay, Bayern defender Patrik Andersson scored from the free kick, handing Bayern the draw they needed to secure their 16th Bundesliga title.

== First team squad ==
Squad at end of season

Note: Flags indicate national team as defined under FIFA eligibility rules; some limited exceptions apply. Players may hold more than one non-FIFA nationality.

No.	Pos.	Nation	Player
1	GK	GER	Hans-Jörg Butt
2	DF	GER	Jochen Kientz
3	DF	CRO	Andrej Panadić
4	DF	GER	Ingo Hertzsch
5	DF	NED	Nico-Jan Hoogma
6	DF	GER	Jan Sandmann
7	MF	GER	Martin Groth
9	FW	CZE	Marek Heinz
10	MF	GER	Thomas Doll
11	MF	CRO	Niko Kovač (Note: Kovač was born in Wedding, West Germany (now Germany), but also qualified to represent Croatia and Bosnia and Herzegovina internationally through his parents and made his international debut for Croatia in December 1996.)
12	MF	DEN	Stig Tøfting
13	MF	GER	Andreas Fischer
14	FW	BIH	Sergej Barbarez
15	DF	IRN	Mehdi Mahdavikia
16	FW	IRN	Vahid Hashemian
17	FW	GHA	Tony Yeboah

No.	Pos.	Nation	Player
18	MF	GER	Ronald Maul
19	FW	GER	Soner Uysal
20	MF	GER	Bernd Hollerbach
22	FW	GER	Roy Präger
23	GK	GER	Carsten Wehlmann
24	FW	GER	Mahmut Yılmaz
25	DF	GER	Benjamin Kruse
26	FW	GER	Marinus Bester
27	MF	ARG	Rodolfo Cardoso
28	FW	GER	Marcel Ketelaer
30	DF	CZE	Tomáš Ujfaluši
31	GK	GER	Mathias Schober (on loan from Schalke)
32	GK	GER	Thomas Hillenbrand
33	FW	NED	Erik Meijer
37	DF	CZE	Milan Fukal

=== Left club during season ===
Note: Flags indicate national team as defined under FIFA eligibility rules; some limited exceptions apply. Players may hold more than one non-FIFA nationality.

No.	Pos.	Nation	Player
8	FW	POL	Jacek Dembiński (to Widzew Łódź)
21	MF	GER	Harald Spörl (to LR Ahlen)
29	FW	GER	Karsten Bäron (retired)

No.	Pos.	Nation	Player
30	MF	GER	Christof Babatz (to Mainz 05)
31	FW	YUG	Vanja Grubač (to OFK Beograd)

== Competitions ==
=== Bundesliga ===
==== League table ====
Pos	Team	Pld	W	D	L	GF	GA	GD	Pts	Qualification or relegation
11	1860 Munich	34	12	8	14	43	55	−12	44	Qualification to Intertoto Cup second round
12	Hansa Rostock	34	12	7	15	34	47	−13	43	
13	Hamburger SV	34	10	11	13	58	58	0	41	
14	Energie Cottbus	34	12	3	19	38	52	−14	39	
15	VfB Stuttgart	34	9	11	14	42	49	−7	38	

Source: www.dfb.de
Rules for classification: 1) points; 2) goal difference; 3) number of goals scored.
