= 2001–02 Hamburger SV season =

Hamburger SV
2001–02 season
- Manager: Kurt Jara
- Bundesliga: 11th
- DFB-Pokal: Second round
- Top goalscorer: Bernardo Romeo (8)
| Home colours | Away colours | Third colours |

Hamburger SV had another mediocre season, finishing in the lower reaches of the mid-table of Bundesliga. Mid-season purchase Bernardo Romeo made his mark immediately at his new club, which somewhat compensated for Sergej Barbarez loss of form. At the end of the season, Hamburg was ten points from both European qualifying and relegation.

== Players ==
=== First-team squad ===
Squad at end of season

Note: Flags indicate national team as defined under FIFA eligibility rules; some limited exceptions apply. Players may hold more than one non-FIFA nationality.

| No. | Pos. | Nation | Player |
|---|---|---|---|
| 1 | GK | GER | Martin Pieckenhagen |
| 2 | DF | GER | Marcel Maltritz |
| 4 | DF | GER | Ingo Hertzsch |
| 5 | DF | NED | Nico-Jan Hoogma |
| 6 | DF | GER | Jan Sandmann |
| 7 | MF | GER | Martin Groth |
| 8 | FW | GER | Marcel Ketelaer |
| 9 | FW | CZE | Marek Heinz |
| 10 | MF | GER | Jörg Albertz |
| 11 | FW | NED | Erik Meijer |
| 13 | GK | GER | Thomas Hillenbrand |
| 14 | FW | BIH | Sergej Barbarez |
| 15 | DF | IRI | Mehdi Mahdavikia |

| No. | Pos. | Nation | Player |
|---|---|---|---|
| 16 | DF | GER | René Schneider |
| 17 | FW | ARG | Bernardo Romeo |
| 18 | DF | CZE | Milan Fukal |
| 19 | MF | LBN | Roda Antar (Note: Antar was born in Freetown, Sierra Leone, but also qualified to represent Lebanon internationally and represented Lebanon at U-21 level before making his international debut for Lebanon in 1998.) (on loan from Tadamon Sour) |
| 20 | MF | GER | Bernd Hollerbach |
| 21 | DF | CZE | Tomáš Ujfaluši |
| 22 | FW | GER | Roy Präger |
| 24 | FW | GER | Mahmut Yılmaz |
| 25 | FW | DEN | Kim Christensen |
| 27 | MF | ARG | Rodolfo Cardoso |
| 28 | MF | NAM | Collin Benjamin |
| 29 | GK | GER | Stefan Wächter |
| 30 | MF | SUI | Raphaël Wicky |

=== Left club during season ===
Note: Flags indicate national team as defined under FIFA eligibility rules; some limited exceptions apply. Players may hold more than one non-FIFA nationality.

| No. | Pos. | Nation | Player |
|---|---|---|---|
| 3 | DF | CRO | Andrej Panadić (to Sturm Graz) |
| 12 | MF | DEN | Stig Tøfting (to Bolton Wanderers) |
| 17 | FW | GHA | Tony Yeboah (to Al-Ittihad) |

| No. | Pos. | Nation | Player |
|---|---|---|---|
| 23 | GK | GER | Carsten Wehlmann (to Hannover 96) |
| 25 | DF | GER | Benjamin Kruse (to Freiburg) |
| 26 | FW | GER | Marinus Bester (to Hamburger SV Amateure) |

== Competitions ==
=== Bundesliga ===
==== League table ====
| Pos | Team | Pld | W | D | L | GF | GA | GD | Pts | Qualification or relegation |
|---|---|---|---|---|---|---|---|---|---|---|
| 9 | 1860 Munich | 34 | 15 | 5 | 14 | 59 | 59 | 0 | 50 | Qualification to Intertoto Cup second round |
| 10 | VfL Wolfsburg | 34 | 13 | 7 | 14 | 57 | 49 | +8 | 46 | |
| 11 | Hamburger SV | 34 | 10 | 10 | 14 | 51 | 57 | −6 | 40 | |
| 12 | Borussia Mönchengladbach | 34 | 9 | 12 | 13 | 41 | 53 | −12 | 39 | |
| 13 | Energie Cottbus | 34 | 9 | 8 | 17 | 36 | 60 | −24 | 35 | |

Source: bundesliga.de
Rules for classification: 1) points; 2) goal difference; 3) number of goals scored.

==== Matches ====
- Energie Cottbus-Hamburg 1–0
- 1–0 Vasile Miriuță 90' (pen.)
- Hamburg-Stuttgart 2–0
- 1–0 Jörg Albertz 40'
- 2–0 Erik Meijer 49'
- 1860 Munich-Hamburg 1–1
- 0–1 Nico-Jan Hoogma 6'
- 1–1 Paul Agostino 67'
- Hamburg-Kaiserslautern 2–3
- 0–1 Lincoln 19'
- 0–2 Lincoln 22'
- 0–3 Jeff Strasser 28'
- 1–3 Nico-Jan Hoogma 56'
- 2–3 Erik Meijer 64'
- Köln-Hamburg 2–1
- 0–1 Carsten Cullmann 21' (o.g.)
- 1–1 Dirk Lottner 67'
- 2–1 Dirk Lottner 90'
- Hamburg-Mönchengladbach 3–3
- 1–0 Collin Benjamin 14'
- 2–0 Jörg Albertz 17' (pen.)
- 2–1 Markus Münch 22'
- 2–2 Peter van Houdt 56'
- 2–3 Marcin Mięciel 90'
- 3–3 Jörg Albertz 90'
- Hamburg-Werder Bremen 0–4
- 0–1 Aílton 14'
- 0–2 Marco Bode 34'
- 0–3 Fabian Ernst 84'
- 0–4 Paul Stalteri 86'
- Nürnberg-Hamburg 0–0
- Hamburg-Hertha BSC 4–0
- 1–0 Sergej Barbarez 37'
- 2–0 Marcel Ketelaer 41'
- 3–0 Marcel Ketelaer 47'
- 4–0 Collin Benjamin 59'
- Wolfsburg-Hamburg 0–1
- 0–1 Nico-Jan Hoogma 57'
- Hamburg-Hansa Rostock 0–1
- 0–1 Markus Beierle 42'
- Bayern Munich-Hamburg 3–0
- 1–0 Paulo Sérgio 69'
- 2–0 Claudio Pizarro 84'
- 3–0 Claudio Pizarro 89'
- Hamburg-Schalke 04 0–0
- Bayer Leverkusen-Hamburg 4–1
- 0–1 Jörg Albertz 7'
- 1–1 Michael Ballack 14'
- 2–1 Oliver Neuville 27'
- 3–1 Oliver Neuville 58'
- 4–1 Oliver Neuville 63'
- Hamburg-St. Pauli 4–3
- 1–0 Erik Meijer 4'
- 2–0 Milan Fukal 8'
- 3–0 Collin Benjamin 45'
- 3–1 Thomas Meggle 47'
- 4–1 Sergej Barbarez 52'
- 4–2 André Trulsen 79'
- 4–3 André Trulsen 83'
- Borussia Dortmund-Hamburg 1–0
- 1–0 Lars Ricken 50'
- Hamburg-Freiburg 1–1
- 1–0 Roy Präger 29'
- 1–1 Stefan Müller 69'
- Hamburg-Energie Cottbus 5–2
- 0–1 Silvio Schroter 26'
- 1–1 Roy Präger 52'
- 2–1 Roy Präger 60'
- 3–1 Milan Fukal 63'
- 4–1 Mehdi Mahdavikia 74'
- 5–1 Sergej Barbarez 82'
- 5–2 Laurentiu Reghecampf 83'
- Stuttgart-Hamburg 3–0
- 1–0 Ioan Ganea 27'
- 2–0 Ingo Hertzsch 32' (o.g.)
- 3–0 Marcelo Bordon 77'
- Hamburg-1860 Munich 2–1
- 1–0 Roy Präger 60'
- 2–0 Bernardo Romeo 81'
- 2–1 Markus Weissenberger 89'
- Kaiserslautern-Hamburg 2–2
- 1–0 Mario Basler 4'
- 1–1 Bernardo Romeo 11'
- 2–1 Miroslav Klose 76'
- 2–2 Marek Heinz 80'
- Hamburg-Köln 4–0
- 1–0 Milan Fukal 34'
- 2–0 Moses Sichone 64' (o.g.)
- 3–0 Sergej Barbarez 67'
- 4–0 Bernardo Romeo 83'
- Mönchengladbach-Hamburg 2–1
- 1–0 Peter van Houdt 3'
- 1–1 Rodolfo Cardoso 29'
- 2–1 Igor Demo 31' (pen.)
- Werder Bremen-Hamburg 0–1
- 0–1 Bernardo Romeo 74'
- Hamburg-Nürnberg 3–1
- 1–0 Darius Kampa 22' (o.g.)
- 2–0 Milan Fukal 39'
- 2–1 Jacek Krzynówek 41'
- 3–1 Roda Antar 86'
- Hertha BSC-Hamburg 6–0
- 1–0 Michael Preetz 40'
- 2–0 Bart Goor 44'
- 3–0 Marcelinho 54'
- 4–0 Bart Goor 62'
- 5–0 Bart Goor 85'
- 6–0 Bart Goor 90'
- Hamburg-Wolfsburg 1–1
- 0–1 Diego Klimowicz 45'
- 1–1 Sergej Barbarez 67'
- Hansa Rostock-Hamburg 1–1
- 1–0 Andreas Jakobsson 51'
- 1–1 Sergej Barbarez 66'
- Hamburg-Bayern Munich 0–0
- Schalke 04-Hamburg 2–0
- 1–0 Émile Mpenza 8'
- 2–0 Ebbe Sand 39'
- Hamburg-Bayer Leverkusen 1–1
- 1–0 Sergej Barbarez 5'
- 1–1 Oliver Neuville 13'
- St. Pauli-Hamburg 0–4
- 0–1 Bernardo Romeo 18'
- 0–2 Martin Groth 44'
- 0–3 Nico-Jan Hoogma 49'
- 0–4 Bernardo Romeo 58'
- Hamburg-Borussia Dortmund 3–4
- 0–1 Márcio Amoroso 36' (pen.)
- 0–2 Tomáš Rosický 38'
- 1–2 Raphaël Wicky 42' (pen.)
- 1–3 Márcio Amoroso 63'
- 2–3 Nico-Jan Hoogma 80'
- 2–4 Jan Koller 87'
- 3–4 Erik Meijer 90'
- Freiburg-Hamburg 4–3
- 0–1 Rodolfo Cardoso 26'
- 1–1 Milan Fukal 28' (o.g.)
- 2–1 Soumaila Coulibaly 36'
- 2–2 Bernardo Romeo 43'
- 2–3 Bernardo Romeo 70'
- 3–3 Soumaila Coulibaly 76'
- 4–3 Soumaila Coulibaly 83'

== Statistics ==
=== Topscorers ===
- (Argentina) Bernardo Romeo 8
- (Bosnia and Herzegovina) Sergej Barbarez 7
- (Netherlands) Erik Meijer 4
- (Germany) Jörg Albertz 4
- (Netherlands) Nico-Jan Hoogma 4

== Sources ==
Hamburg – Soccerbase.com
