= 2012 Shandong Luneng Taishan F.C. season =

Shandong Luneng
- Chairman: Sun Guoyu
- Manager: Henk ten Cate
- Super League: –
- FA Cup: –
Home colours	Away colours

The 2012 Shandong Lunen Taishan F.C. season is Shandong's 19th consecutive season in the top division of Chinese football. Shandong will also be competing in the Chinese FA Cup.

== Squad ==
Note: Flags indicate national team as defined under FIFA eligibility rules; some limited exceptions apply. Players may hold more than one non-FIFA nationality.

No.	Pos.	Nation	Player
1	GK	CHN	Yang Cheng
2	DF	CHN	Liu Jindong (Captain)
3	DF	CHN	Du Wei
5	DF	CHN	Wang Qiang
6	MF	CHN	Zhou Haibin
7	MF	CHN	Cui Peng
8	MF	CHN	Wang Yongpo
9	FW	CHN	Han Peng (vice captain)
11	DF	CHN	Wang Tong
12	GK	CHN	Geng Xiaofeng
13	FW	CHN	Gao Di
14	MF	CHN	Mirahmetjan Muzepper
15	DF	CHN	Yuan Weiwei
16	DF	CHN	Zheng Zheng
17	FW	CHN	Hao Junmin
18	MF	LBN	Roda Antar

No.	Pos.	Nation	Player
19	MF	CHN	Zhang Chi
21	MF	CHN	Liu Binbin
23	MF	CHN	Li Wei
24	FW	CHN	Lü Zheng
25	DF	CHN	Liu Yang
26	MF	CHN	Xia Ningning
27	MF	CHN	Ma Long
28	MF	CHN	Ma Xingyu
29	FW	BRA	Gilberto Macena
30	GK	CHN	Shao Puliang
31	MF	MOZ	Simão Mate Junior
32	MF	ARG	Leonardo Pisculichi
33	FW	PAR	José Ortigoza
34	FW	CHN	Yang Chen
35	MF	CHN	Sun Dong
36	MF	CHN	Wu Xinghan

=== Reserve squad ===
Note: Flags indicate national team as defined under FIFA eligibility rules; some limited exceptions apply. Players may hold more than one non-FIFA nationality.

No.	Pos.	Nation	Player
37	DF	CHN	Qi Tianyu
38	DF	CHN	Li Songyi
39	DF	CHN	Otkur Hasan
40	FW	CHN	Chen Hao

No.	Pos.	Nation	Player
41	MF	CHN	Luo Senwen
42	GK	CHN	Han Rongze
43	DF	CHN	Mi Haolun

=== On loan ===
Note: Flags indicate national team as defined under FIFA eligibility rules; some limited exceptions apply. Players may hold more than one non-FIFA nationality.

No.	Pos.	Nation	Player
10	FW	BRA	Obina (at (Brazil) Palmeiras until 31 December 2012)
-	DF	CHN	Jiao Zhe (at Beijing Guoan until 31 December 2012)

== Transfers ==
=== Winter ===
In:

No.	Pos.	Nation	Player
20	FW	CHN	Wang Gang (loan return from (Portugal) S.C. Covilhã)
29	FW	BRA	Gilberto Macena (from (Denmark) AC Horsens)
-	DF	CHN	Jiao Zhe (loan return from Hangzhou Greentown)

Out:

No.	Pos.	Nation	Player
1	GK	CHN	Li Leilei (Retired)
17	MF	HON	Julio César de León (to (Honduras) C.D. Motagua)
20	MF	CHN	Wang Liang (to Liaoning Whowin)
21	MF	CHN	Deng Zhuoxiang (to Jiangsu Sainty)
29	DF	CPV	Ricardo (to (Portugal) F.C. Paços de Ferreira)
31	FW	CHN	Yu Shuai (Released)
32	DF	CHN	Gong Yaotong (to Qingdao Jonoon)
33	DF	CHN	Ren Yongshun (to Qinghai Senke)
36	GK	CHN	Liu Weiguo (to Dalian Aerbin)
37	MF	CHN	Wang Boren (to Qinghai Senke)
38	MF	CHN	Zhao Wan (to Qinghai Senke)
39	MF	CHN	Zhao Hongxu (to Liaoning Whowin)
40	DF	CHN	Liu Zhao (Released)
-	DF	CHN	Jiao Zhe (loan to Beijing Guoan)

=== Summer ===
In:

No.	Pos.	Nation	Player
3	DF	CHN	Du Wei (from Hangzhou Greentown)
31	MF	MOZ	Simão Mate Junior (from (Greece) Panathinaikos)
32	MF	ARG	Leonardo Pisculichi (from (Qatar) Al-Arabi SC)
33	FW	PAR	José Ortigoza (from (Paraguay) Sol de América)
-	DF	BRA	Renato Silva (loan return from (Brazil) Vasco da Gama)

Out:

No.	Pos.	Nation	Player
4	DF	BRA	Fabiano (Released)
10	FW	BRA	Obina (loan to (Brazil) Palmeiras)
-	DF	BRA	Renato Silva (to (Brazil) Vasco da Gama)

== Competitions ==
=== Chinese Super League ===
==== Results ====
10 March 2012 1	Guizhou Moutai	2–1	Shandong Luneng Taishan	Guiyang Olympic Centre
19:40 CST UTC+8	Djulbic (yellow card) 41'; Zhang Chenglin (yellow card) 54'; Djulbic 56'; Zhang Chenglin (yellow card) 54' (yellow-red card) 90+2'; Jordà 90+3'	Report	31' Antar; (yellow card) 52' Xia Ningning	Attendance: 51,983; Referee: Tan Hai

24 March 2012 3	Shandong Luneng Taishan	3–3	Dalian Aerbin	Shandong Provincial Stadium
19:30 CST UTC+8	Antar 7'; Obina 12', 61'; Wang Qiang (yellow card) 76'	Report	Yu Dabao 2'; Canales 5'; Zhou Tong 16' (yellow card) 45'; Chang Lin (yellow card) 36' (yellow-red card) 68'	Attendance: 28,117; Referee: (South Korea) Lee Sam-Ho

30 March 2012 4	Qingdao Jonoon	0–1	Shandong Luneng Taishan	Qingdao Tiantai Stadium
20:35 CST UTC+8	Melkam (yellow card) 33'; Wei Renjie (yellow card) 40'; Zhu Shiyu (yellow card) 42'; Léo San (yellow card) 47'	Report	Hao Junmin 4'; Wang Qiang (yellow card) 8'	Attendance: 12,136; Referee: (China) Wang Di

7 April 2012 5	Shandong Luneng Taishan	0–0	Jiangsu Sainty	Shandong Provincial Stadium
20:30 CST UTC+8	Antar (yellow card) 90'	Report	Tajiev (yellow card) 70'	Attendance: 25,320; Referee: (China) Xu Fuxin

13 April 2012 6	Beijing Guoan	2–1	Shandong Luneng Taishan	Workers Stadium
20:30 CST UTC+8	Reinaldo 16'; Xu Liang (yellow card) 32' (goal) 70'; Hou Sen (yellow card) 75'	Report	Gilberto Macena 9'; Ma Xingyu (yellow card) 27'; Yuan Weiwei (yellow card) 62' (yellow-red card) 74'	Attendance: 41,287; Referee: (Hong Kong) Wong Chi Tang

21 April 2012 7	Shandong Luneng Taishan	2–1	Guangzhou R&F	Shandong Provincial Stadium
20:30 CST UTC+8	Antar 23'; Gilberto Macena 30' (yellow card) 33'; Ma Xingyu (yellow card) 41'; Zheng Zheng (yellow card) 73'; Lü Zheng (yellow card) 90'	Report	Xu Bo (yellow card) 8'; Jumar (yellow card) 25'; Rafael Coelho (yellow card) 50'; Zhang Yuan 83'	Attendance: 21,718; Referee: (China) Fan Qi

28 April 2012 8	Shanghai Shenhua	0–0	Shandong Luneng Taishan	Hongkou Football Stadium
20:45 CST UTC+8	Yu Tao (yellow card) 20'; Moisés (yellow card) 54'; Božić (yellow card) 73'	Report	Antar (yellow card) 33'; Gilberto Macena (yellow card) 85'	Attendance: 11,348; Referee: (China) Xu Fuxin

5 May 2012 9	Shandong Luneng Taishan	1–2	Hangzhou Greentown	Shandong Provincial Stadium
20:45 CST UTC+8	Yuan Weiwei (yellow card) 32'; Tang Jiashu 45' (o.g.); Obina (yellow card) 85'	Report	Fabrício 18'; Mazola (yellow card) 60' (goal) 83'; Liu Bin (yellow card) 90'; Feng Gang (yellow card) 90+2'; Jiang Bo (yellow card) 90+4'; Bari Mamatil (yellow card) 90+5'	Attendance: 15,612; Referee: (China) Huang Yejun

11 May 2012 10	Tianjin Teda	2–0	Shandong Luneng Taishan	TEDA Football Stadium
20:45 CST UTC+8	Li Weifeng (yellow card) 39'; Ars 67'; Susak 70'	Report	Liu Yang (yellow card) 35'; Zheng Zheng (yellow card) 41'	Attendance: 11,688; Referee: (China) Wang Zhe

19 May 2012 11	Shandong Luneng Taishan	2–2	Dalian Shide	Shandong Provincial Stadium
20:30 CST UTC+8	Xia Ningning (yellow card) 21'; Fabiano 28' (pen.) (yellow card) 28'; Obina (yellow card) 41'; Gilberto Macena 68'	Report	Yang Boyu (yellow card) 16'; Zhang Chong (yellow card) 27'; Quan Lei 60'; Park Dong-Hyuk 81'; Chamanga (yellow card) 90+2'	Attendance: 13,297; Referee: (China) Wang Jin

25 May 2012 12	Shandong Luneng Taishan	1–1	Guangzhou Evergrande	Shandong Provincial Stadium
20:30 CST UTC+8	Liu Yang (yellow card) 29'; Zheng Zheng (yellow card) 32'; Wang Yongpo 85'	Report	Zhang Linpeng 5'; Feng Xiaoting (yellow card) 64'; Zheng Zhi (yellow card) 87'; Wu Pingfeng (yellow card) 88'	Attendance: 33,453; Referee: (China) Hai Tan

12 June 2012 2	Changchun Yatai	1–0	Shandong Luneng Taishan	Development Area Stadium
16:30 CST UTC+8	Weldon 55'; Cheng Changcheng (yellow card) 71'	Report	Zheng Zheng (yellow card) 11'	Attendance: 10,703; Referee: (China) Tao Rancheng

16 June 2012 13	Liaoning Whowin	1–0	Shandong Luneng Taishan	Tiexi New District Sports Center
20:30 CST UTC+8	Zhang Jingyang 2'; Ding Jie (yellow card) 6' (yellow-red card) 90+1'; Grozdanoski (yellow card) 31'	Report	Liu Yang (yellow card) 38'; Wang Qiang (red card) 75'	Attendance: 17,531; Referee: (China) Zhong Jun

23 June 2012 14	Shandong Luneng Taishan	3–1	Shanghai Shenxin	Shandong Provincial Stadium
20:30 CST UTC+8	Gilberto Macena 26'; Wang Tong 45+1'; Wu Xinghan 80'; Yuan Weiwei (yellow card) 88'	Summary	Wang Jiayu (yellow card) 34'; Johnny 54'; Jiang Zhipeng (yellow card) 61'	Attendance: 12,019; Referee: (China) Li Haihe

7 July 2012 16	Shandong Luneng Taishan	3–1	Guizhou Renhe	Shandong Provincial Stadium
20:30 CST UTC+8	Wang Yongpo 34'; Gilberto Macena 52'; Du Wei 70' (pen.)	Summary	Liu Tianqi (yellow card) 56'; Rafa Jordà 90'	Attendance: 14,437; Referee: (China) Fan Qi

14 July 2012 17	Shandong Luneng Taishan	3–0	Changchun Yatai	Shandong Provincial Stadium
20:30 CST UTC+8	Gilberto Macena 21', 59'; Wang Yongpo 90'	Summary	Kássio (yellow card) 20'	Attendance: 22,360; Referee: (China) Wang Zhe

21 July 2012 18	Dalian Aerbin	5–2	Shandong Luneng Taishan	Jinzhou Stadium
20:00 CST UTC+8	Fábio Rochemback (yellow card) 19' (goal) 72'; Yu Dabao 23'; Utaka 45+3', 65', 86'; Mullen (yellow card) 68'	Summary	Geng Xiaofeng (yellow card) 36'; Ortigoza (yellow card) 48'; Wang Yongpo 63' (pen.) (yellow card) 74'; Du Wei 68' (yellow card) 77'	Attendance: 21,058; Referee: (China) Ma Ning

28 July 2012 19	Shandong Luneng Taishan	1–1	Qingdao Jonoon	Shandong Provincial Stadium
20:30 CST UTC+8	Wang Yongpo 30'; Wang Tong (yellow card) 61'; Gilberto Macena (yellow card) 90'	Summary	Bruno Meneghel 48'; Li Peng (yellow card) 59'; Mou Pengfei (yellow card) 88'; Zhu Jianrong (yellow card) 90'	Attendance: 16,158; Referee: (Japan) Hiroyuki Kimura

5 August 2012 20	Jiangsu Guoxin Sainty	3–3	Shandong Luneng Taishan	Nanjing Olympic Sports Center
19:40 CST UTC+8	Dănălache 6', 30', 45' (pen.)	Report	Du Wei 3'; Lü Zheng 18'; Simão 59'	Attendance: 32,935; Referee: (China) Ai Kun

11 August 2012 21	Shandong Luneng Taishan	4–0	Beijing Guoan	Shandong Provincial Stadium
19:30 CST UTC+8	Wang Yongpo 8', 39' (pen.); Lü Zheng 80', 87'	Report		Attendance: 20,656; Referee: (China) Ma Ning

19 August 2012 22	Guangzhou R&F	4–2	Shandong Luneng Taishan	Yuexiushan Stadium
19:30 CST UTC+8	Yakubu 9'; Rafael Coelho 19', 49'; Zhang Yuan 45'	Report	Cui Peng (yellow card) 24' (yellow-red card) 44'; Ortigoza 59'; Wang Yongpo	Attendance: 8,558; Referee: (China) Wang Jin

25 August 2012 23	Shandong Luneng Taishan	3–3	Shanghai Shenhua	Shandong Provincial Stadium
19:30 CST UTC+8	Wang Yongpo 54' (pen.); Macena 66'; Ortigoza 79'	Report	Drogba 2', 75'; Dai Lin (yellow card) 58' (yellow-red card) 60'; Anelka 87'	Attendance: 31,896; Referee: (Thailand) Chaiya Alee Mahapab

1 September 2012 15	Henan Jianye	2–1	Shandong Luneng Taishan	Zhengzhou Hanghai Stadium
19:45 CST UTC+8	Katongo 48' (pen.); Zhang Li 88'	Summary	Gao Di 86'	Attendance: 11,831; Referee: (China) Fan Qi

23 September 2012 25	Shandong Luneng Taishan	2–0	Tianjin Teda	Shandong Provincial Stadium
19:30 CST UTC+8	Hao Junmin 52'; Wang Qiang 69'	Report		Attendance: 10,783; Referee: (South Korea) Dae-Woo Choi

29 September 2012 26	Dalian Shide	1–1	Shandong Luneng Taishan	Jinzhou Stadium
19:00 CST UTC+8	Kamburov 58' (pen.)	Report	Antar 30' (pen.)	Attendance: 8,786; Referee: (China) Ma Li

3 October 2012 24	Hangzhou Greentown	0–0	Shandong Luneng Taishan	Zhejiang Huanglong Sports Center
19:35 CST UTC+8		Report		Attendance: 5,084; Referee: (Vietnam) Vo Minh Tri

7 October 2012 27	Guangzhou Evergrande	3–2	Shandong Luneng Taishan	Tianhe Stadium
19:35 CST UTC+8	Cléo 26'; Zheng Zhi 55'; Barrios 81'	Report	Macena 36'; Han Peng 67'	Attendance: 36,857; Referee: (China) Wang Zhe

20 October 2012 28	Shandong Luneng Taishan	1–1	Liaoning Whowin	Shandong Provincial Stadium
19:30 CST UTC+8	Gao Di 83'	Report	Zhang Ye 27'	Attendance: 15,377; Referee: (China) Li Jun

27 October 2012 29	Shanghai Shenxin	1–1	Shandong Luneng Taishan	Yuanshen Sports Centre Stadium
15:30 CST UTC+8	Wang Jiayu 72'	Report	Du Wei 90'	Attendance: 14,086; Referee: (South Korea) Dae-Woo Choi

3 November 2012 30	Shandong Luneng Taishan	2–0	Henan Jianye	Shandong Provincial Stadium
15:30 CST UTC+8	Macena 37'; Han Peng 84'	Report		Attendance: 21,021; Referee: (China) Shi Zhenlu

==== League table ====
Pos	Team	Pld	W	D	L	GF	GA	GD	Pts	Qualification or relegation
10	Liaoning Whowin	30	8	12	10	40	41	−1	36 (Note: Liaoning, 10pts; Hangzhou, 9pts; Shandong, 6pts, GF=4, GA=5; Qingdao, 6pts, GF=4, GA=5)	
11	Hangzhou Greentown	30	9	9	12	34	46	−12	36	
12	Shandong Luneng	30	8	12	10	46	43	+3	36	
13	Qingdao Jonoon	30	10	6	14	26	34	−8	36	
14	Dalian Shide (D, R)	30	8	10	12	39	49	−10	34	Disbanded after season (Note: On 30 November 2012, Dalian Shide were acquisited by Aerbin Group and merged into Dalian Aerbin after their owner was arrested.)

Source: Chinese Super League (in Chinese)
Rules for classification: 1) points; 2) goal difference; 3) number of goals scored; 4) head-to-head goals scored; 5) goal difference; 6) goals scored; 7) disciplinary points (1 point for each yellow card, 3 points for each red card). Head-to-Head: Only used at the end of the season when two or more teams need the head-to-head rules to break a tie.
(D) Disqualified; (R) Relegated

=== Chinese FA Cup ===
27 June 2012 Third Round	Shandong Luneng Taishan	4–0	Dongguan Nancheng	Jinan
20:30 CST UTC+8	Yang Chen 21'; Wang Qiang 61'; Lü Zheng 81', 90'	Report		Stadium: Shandong Provincial Stadium; Attendance: 5,206

18 July 2012 Fourth Round	Tianjin Teda	1–1 (2–4 p)	Shandong Luneng Taishan	Tianjin
20:30 CST UTC+8	Mao Biao 57'		Ortigoza 68'	Stadium: TEDA Football Stadium; Attendance: 11,847; Referee: Zhang Zhengping (China)
	Penalties
	Goian (penalty scored); Hu Rentian (penalty missed); Liao Bochao (penalty scored); Wang Xinxin (penalty missed)		(penalty missed) Xia Ningning; (penalty scored) Wang Yongpo; (penalty scored) Antar; (penalty scored) Wu Xinghan; (penalty scored) Pisculichi

1 August 2012 Quarter-finals	Shandong Luneng Taishan	1–0	Changchun Yatai	Jinan
19:45 CST UTC+8	Wang Yongpo 80' (pen.)	[ Report]		Stadium: Shandong Provincial Stadium; Attendance: 8,297; Referee: Fan Qi (China)

22 August 2012 Semi-finals 1st leg	Guizhou Moutai	1–1	Shandong Luneng Taishan	Guiyang
19:30 CST UTC+8	Rubén 1'	[ Report]	Wang Yongpo 56'	Stadium: Guiyang Olympic Sports Center; Attendance: 21,023; Referee: Prathan Nasa Wang (Thailand)

26 September 2012 Semi-finals 2nd leg	Shandong Luneng Taishan	2–2 (3 – 3 a agg.)	Guizhou Moutai	Jinan
15:30 CST UTC+8	Wang Yongpo 45'; Simão 62'	[ Report]	Muslimović 49'; Jordà 72'	Stadium: Shandong Provincial Stadium; Referee: Võ Minh Trí (Vietnam)

== Squad statistics ==
=== Top scorers ===
Place	Position	Nation	Number	Name	Super League	FA Cup	Total
1	MF	(China)	8	Wang Yongpo	9	3	12
2	FW	(Brazil)	29	Gilberto Macena	10	0	10
3	FW	(China)	24	Lü Zheng	3	2	5
4	MF	(Lebanon)	18	Roda Antar	4	0	4
4	DF	(China)	3	Du Wei	4	0	4
6	FW	(Paraguay)	33	José Ortigoza	2	1	3
7	FW	(Brazil)	10	Obina	2	0	2
7	FW	(China)	17	Hao Junmin	2	0	2
7	FW	(China)	13	Gao Di	2	0	2
7	FW	(China)	9	Han Peng	2	0	2
7	DF	(China)	5	Wang Qiang	1	1	2
7	MF	(Mozambique)	31	Simão	1	1	2
13	DF	(Brazil)	4	Fabiano	1	0	1
13	DF	(China)	11	Wang Tong	1	0	1
13	MF	(China)	36	Wu Xinghan	1	0	1
13				Own goal	1	0	1
13	FW	(China)	34	Yang Chen	0	1	1
				TOTALS	46	9	55
