= Benjamin Kruse =

Benjamin Kruse may refer to:

- Benjamin Kruse (footballer) (born 1978), German football player
- Benjamin Kruse (politician) (born 1978), member of the Minnesota State Senate
