= Roda Antar =

Lebanese footballer and manager (born 1980)

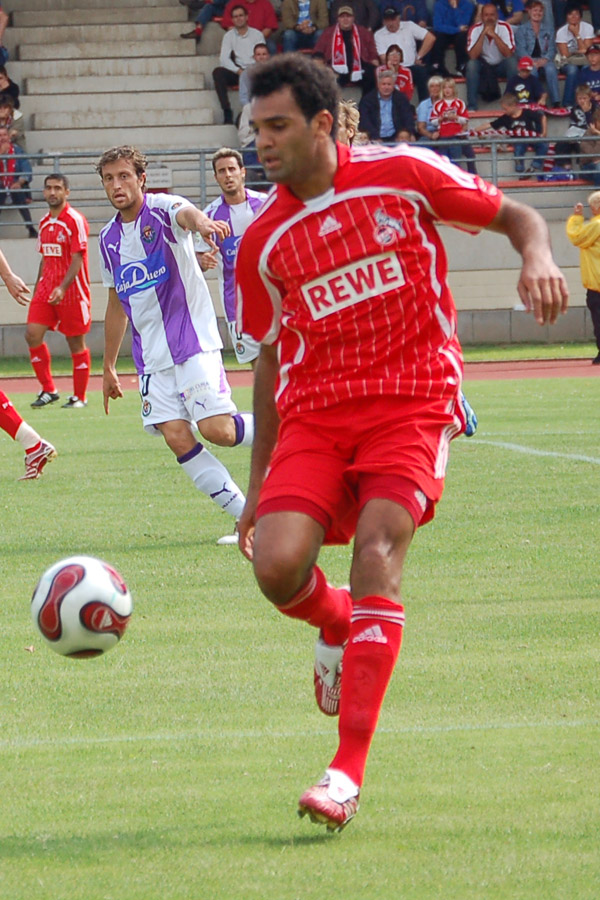
- Antar with 1. FC Köln in 2007

Personal information
- Full name: Roda Abdelhassan Antar
- Date of birth: 12 September 1980 (age 46)
- Place of birth: Freetown, Sierra Leone
- Height: 1.89 m (6 ft 2 in)
- Position: Midfielder

Senior career*
Years	Team	Apps	(Gls)
1998–2003	Tadamon Sour		(13)
2001–2003	→ Hamburger SV (loan)	23	(2)
2001–2003	→ Hamburger SV II (loan)	20	(11)
2003–2007	SC Freiburg	98	(26)
2007–2009	1. FC Köln	46	(7)
2009–2013	Shandong Luneng Taishan	128	(36)
2014	Jiangsu Sainty	29	(5)
2015	Hangzhou Greentown	27	(1)
2016–2017	Tadamon Sour	16	(6)
Total		307+	(106)

International career
1998–2001	Lebanon U21		
1998–2016	Lebanon	83	(20)

Managerial career
- 2017–2019: Racing Beirut
- 2020: Lebanon U23
- 2020–2021: Ahed
- * Club domestic league appearances and goals

Roda Abdelhassan Antar (Arabic: رضا عبد الحسن عنتر; born 12 September 1980) is a professional football manager and former player. Born in Sierra Leone, he is a former captain of the Lebanon national team.

Antar started his career with Tadamon Sour, progressing through their youth system to the first-team squad where he made his debut at the age of 17. In 2001, he was loaned to Germany's Hamburger SV for two seasons, winning the DFB-Ligapokal in 2003, before moving to SC Freiburg in 2003 on a permanent deal. In 2007, he moved to 1. FC Köln, helping them gain promotion back into the Bundesliga for the 2008–09 season. In 2009, Antar moved to Chinese Super League side Shandong Luneng Taishan, where he remained for five years and won a league title in 2010; he then played for Jiangsu Sainty in 2014, and Hangzhou Greentown in 2015. Antar returned to Tadamon Sour in 2016, where he retired after one season.

Born in Sierra Leone, Antar is of Lebanese descent through his father. He represented Lebanon at international level between 1998 and 2016, playing in the 2000 AFC Asian Cup, the 2000 and 2012 WAFF Championship, and the 1998 and 2002 Arab Nations Cup. Antar also participated in the qualifiers for the 2002, 2006, 2010, 2014, and 2018 FIFA World Cup tournaments. He scored 20 goals for his country as a midfielder.

== Club career ==
=== Tadamon Sour ===
Antar, along with his older brother Faisal Antar, started his career with Lebanese Premier League side Tadamon Sour, progressing through their youth system to the first-team squad. He debuted at the age of 17 during the 1998–99 season, scoring his first goal in April in the 27th minute of a 3–1 home win against Safa. Antar scored his first goal of the 1999–00 season in round 4 in a 2–2 draw against Sagesse in October. He scored four league goals for the season, as Tadaman Sour went onto claim a runners-up position in the Lebanese Federation Cup. Antar scored his first goals for the 2000–01 season, a brace, in a 4–1 away win against Al-Ansar on 10 January. Antar finished the 2000–01 season having scored six league goals.

=== Hamburger SV ===
Due to Antar's performances during the 2002 FIFA World Cup qualifiers in 2001, Lebanon's national team coach, Theo Bücker, had assisted him in a transfer to Bundesliga outfit Hamburger SV, on loan from Lebanese Premier League club Tadamon Sour. Antar made his first appearance in the 2001–02 Bundesliga season in a 1–1 away draw against 1860 Munich on 11 August, where Antar was substituted onto the field for Erik Meijer in the 86th minute. Antar scored his first goal in the Bundesliga in a 3–1 home win against 1. FC Nürnberg on 2 March.

During his two-year stay with the club, Hamburg would claim the 2003 German League Cup, however, after failing to establish himself with the north German side (after he played in the Regionalliga Nord for Hamburg's reserve side for the 2002–03 season), he opted for a free-transfer to SC Freiburg.

=== SC Freiburg ===
Antar was brought to Freiburg by its first-team coach Volker Finke for the 2003–04 season. After a serious injury Antar eventually debuted in December 2003 when he scored a hat-trick in a 4–2 win against VfL Bochum. He was consequently referred to as a "Football God" by Freiburg supporters. During his time at Freiburg Youssef Mohamad, who was Roda's international teammate, was transferred to the club.

=== 1. FC Köln ===
==== 2007–08 season ====
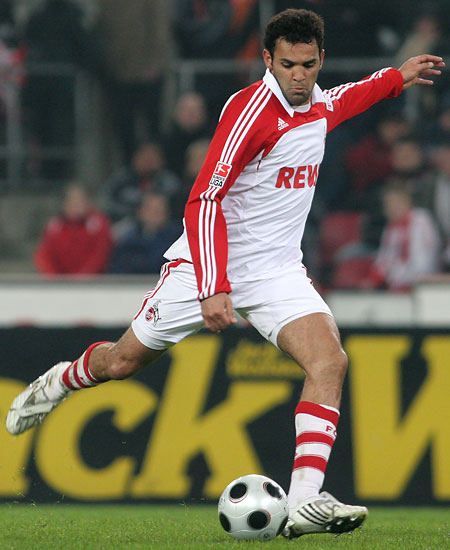
Antar with 1. FC Köln in 2008

In 2007, both Antar and Mohamad were transferred to 2. Bundesliga side 1. FC Köln for the 2007–08 season. He debuted for Köln in a 2–0 away win against FC St. Pauli on 10 August. Antar scored his first goal for Köln, a bicycle kick, in a 2–1 home victory against SV Wehen Wiesbaden on 23 March, the goal was voted as goal of the month. On 4 May 2008, Antar scored Köln's second goal in their 3–1 home victory against 1899 Hoffenheim. In the 79th minute of the match, Antar was deliberately kicked in the face by Hoffenheim midfielder Carlos Eduardo Marques, as confirmed by TV pictures. The referee, Peter Gagelmann, did not see the incident occur, however, the German FA made subsequent investigations before bringing in a charge which resulted in issuing Marques with a multi-game suspension which restricted him from playing in any competitive fixtures for the duration of the 2007–08 season. In the second last game of the 2007–08 season, Antar helped Köln gain promotion back into the Bundesliga, scoring a double in the decisive 2–0 home victory against Mainz 05 on 11 May. Antar finished the season having scored seven goals in 31 league appearances, Köln finished in third spot of the table on 60 points and were promoted to the Bundesliga for the 2008–09 Bundesliga season.

==== 2008–09 season ====
In February 2009, he left Köln after disagreements with club sporting director Michael Meier and manager Christoph Daum. The issue was subject to Antar's commitment to the first-team where which they had spoken to Antar and his adviser. The club's board of directions offered him support and individual training sessions as they felt obliged to fulfill the contractual agreement which initially ran until 30 June 2009, but no contact to him could be made after he did not turn up to the club's training sessions. Antar's agent stated that he had offers from Japan, Russia and China.

=== Shandong Luneng Taishan ===
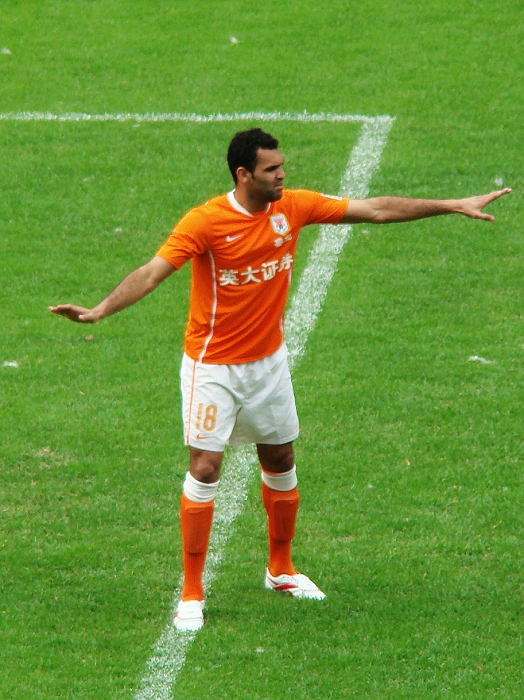
Antar with Shandong Luneng Taishan in 2009

On 16 March 2009 Antar signed to China's Shandong Luneng Taishan for a transfer fee of £630,000 (€700,000). Antar featured in the 2010 AFC Champions League, where which Shandong were eliminated in the group stage.

On the opening day of the 2012 Chinese Super League season, Antar scored in the 32nd minute of the first half to give Shandong the lead in a 2–1 away loss against Guizhou Renhe on 10 March.

On 30 November 2012, it was reported that Chinese Super League club Beijing Guoan were observing Antar as his contract with Shandong Luneng was soon to expire and his contract was not re-newed. However, he later re-newed his contract with Shandong Luneng which kept him at the club until December 2013.

=== Jiangsu Sainty ===
In December 2013, Antar stated that he had agreed terms with Jiangsu Sainty and would leave Shandong Luneng on 31 December 2013 in order to become part of Jiangsu Sainty's squad in January 2014. Wearing the number 6 jersey, Antar debuted for Jiangsu Sainty in first round of the 2014 Chinese Super League in a 1–0 home victory against Guizhou Renhe on 8 March, playing a full 90-minutes of the match.

=== Hangzhou Greentown ===
On 16 January 2015, Antar transferred to fellow Chinese Super League side Hangzhou Greentown. On 20 June 2015, Antar scored for the first time against his former team Jiangsu Sainty with a volley in the 87th minute to tie the game up before his teammate Xie Pengfei scored two minutes later to win them the game 2–1.

=== Return to Tadamon Sour ===
In 2016, Antar moved back to Lebanon, signing for his former club Tadamon Sour. He scored six league goals in 16 matches, before retiring at the end of the season.

== International career ==
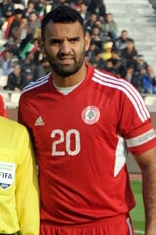
Antar with Lebanon in 2015

Antar was called up to the Lebanon national team aged 18, making two appearances at the 1998 Arab Nations Cup. He scored his first goal in a 2–0 victory at the 2000 WAFF Championship against Kyrgyzstan on 25 May 2000. He then scored two more goals for Lebanon that same year in friendlies against Kuwait (25 June) and Oman (8 August). In 2001, Antar scored six times for Lebanon, reaching nine international goals, where he scored once in a 3–0 friendly victory against Philippines and five more goals during the qualifiers for the 2002 FIFA World Cup. Antar scored his first hat-trick for the national team during the 2002 Arab Nations Cup in a 4–2 victory against Yemen on 24 December 2002. His hat-trick brought him to a total of 12 national team goals. On 25 March 2013, Antar announced his retirement from international football citing that the constance long-distance traveling had left him physically tired and exhausted. In late October 2013, Antar announced his return to the national team. During Lebanon's last 2015 AFC Asian Cup qualification match against Thailand national football team on 5 March 2014, Antar scored Lebanon's fifth goal in their 5–2 away victory, the goal brought his tally to 19 national team goals making him the joint leading goal scorer, with Wartan Ghazarian, of the Lebanon national team.

=== 2000 AFC Asian Cup ===
Antar was selected by coach Josip Skoblar for Lebanon's 23-man squad for the 2000 Asian Cup campaign, where Antar was handed the number 20 shirt. Both Antar and his brother, Faisal had been selected for Lebanon, and Antar was also one of five under-21 players selected in the squad. Antar played in Lebanon's first group-stage match, a 4–0 loss against Iran on 12 October. Antar was substituted off of the field for Moussa Hojeij in the 65th minute. Antar then featured for Lebanon's 2–2 draw against Iraq on 15 October, when he was substituted onto the field for Michael Reda in the 47th minute. Antar then played in Lebanon's 1–1 draw against Thailand on 18 October, when he was again substituted onto the field for Jamal Taha in the 63rd minute. Lebanon were eliminated from the tournament having obtained two points, finished in bottom place of Group A.

=== 2002 FIFA World Cup qualification ===
Under German coach Theo Bücker, Antar played a vital role for Lebanon during the first round qualifiers for the 2002 FIFA World Cup, scoring five goals in five appearances. In Lebanon's opening match, he played a full 90-minutes in their 6–0 victory against Pakistan on 13 May 2001. Antar then scored a double in Lebanon's 4–0 win against Sri Lanka on 15 May 2001. Two days later, Antar scored for Lebanon in the 9th minute giving them a 1–0 lead against Thailand on 17 May 2001. Thailand scored two goals before half-time to eventually win the match 2–1. On 26 May 2001, Antar scored another double in Lebanon's 8–1 victory against Pakistan. On 30 May 2001, Antar played a full 90-minutes of Lebanon's 2–2 draw against Thailand. The result meant that Lebanon finished in second position of their respective group, with 13 points, but failed to advance to the second round of qualifiers.

=== 2006 FIFA World Cup qualification ===
Antar was named captain in 2004 for the second round qualifiers for the 2006 FIFA World Cup, scoring three goals in four appearances. He missed Lebanon's first match against South Korea, a 2–0 loss on 18 February 2004, due to a visa problem. On 31 March 2004, Antar played in his first match of the qualification campaign, a 2–0 away victory against Vietnam, where Antar scored Lebanon's first goal of the match in the 83rd minute. On 9 June 2004, Antar scored in Lebanon's 3–0 home win against Maldives. Antar again scored for Lebanon in their 5–2 away victory against Maldives in Malé on 8 September 2004. On 13 October 2004, Antar played a full 90-minutes of Lebanon's 1–1 home draw against South Korea. The result meant that Lebanon could not proceed to the next round of qualifiers, Lebanon eventually drew 0–0 with Vietnam in Beirut on 17 November 2004 in their last qualification match and finished in second place of their respective qualification group with 11 points.

=== 2010 FIFA World Cup qualification ===
Antar featured in two 2010 FIFA World Cup qualification matches for Lebanon. They were drawn in a first round play-off against India, where Antar scored in Lebanon's 4–0 first-leg victory on 8 October 2007. Following a 2–2 draw in the second leg on 30 October 2007, Lebanon advanced to the next round of qualifiers. Antar then played a full 90-minutes of Lebanon's third round qualifier against Uzbekistan, a 1–0 home defeat on 6 February 2008. Lebanon had obtained no points out of their six group stage matches and finished in bottom place of their respective group.

=== 2014 FIFA World Cup qualification ===
==== Third round ====
After one year of absence due to international retirement, Antar came out of retirement to play under former coach, Theo Bücker, for the AFC third round of the 2014 FIFA World Cup qualification campaign. Having missed Lebanon's opening group-stage match against South Korea in Goyang due to a visa problem, Antar was named captain by Bücker for his first appearance, where he helped Lebanon to a 3–1 home victory against the United Arab Emirates on 6 September 2011. Antar had assisted Akram Moghrabi in scoring Lebanon's second goal and scored the third goal himself with a header in the 83rd minute. Antar was then awarded the man of the match. During Lebanon's third group-stage match on 11 October 2011, Lebanon had drawn 2–2 with Kuwait in front of approximately 32,000 fans in Beirut. On 15 November 2011, Lebanon defeated South Korea 2–1 in Beirut. Lebanon took the lead after 4 minutes when Antar's shot was blocked and then turned in by Ali Al Saadi. Their second goal came after 30 minutes of the first half when Abbas Ali Atwi converted a penalty shot. Antar inspired Lebanon to a spirited and historic victory, recording Lebanon's first ever win over South Korea, and had been instrumental in Lebanon's last four qualifiers as they obtained ten points to share their group's top spot with the South Korea. The 2–1 result sent both teams to the fourth round of the qualifiers. It was after this win that Lebanon striker Mahmoud El Ali hailed the performance of Antar and how much his presence had helped Lebanon. Antar had received his second yellow card of the third round against South Korea and therefore did not take part in Lebanon's 4–2 away loss against the UAE on 29 February 2012.

==== Fourth round ====
During Lebanon's fourth group-stage match of the fourth round on 11 September 2012, Antar scored in the 27th minute of the match to give Lebanon a 1–0 victory against Iran. Antar scored in the 27th minute from a header off a Mohamad Haidar free-kick, upon his return to the team, having missed the opening three games due to injury. The spirited victory not only marked Lebanon's first-ever goal but also its first-ever win against Iran, brought the Iranians' 13-match unbeaten qualifying record to an end. In October 2011, it was reported that Antar praised the Lebanon national team for their results and stated that it was the best national team in their history. He also indicated that his captaincy role was more of a job as opposed to a responsibility and that it was his duty to do his job well and try to win matches alongside his teammates.

=== 2018 FIFA World Cup qualification ===
On 12 November 2015, Antar scored his 20th international goal for Lebanon in a 7–0 home victory against Laos during a 2018 FIFA World Cup qualification match. Antar celebrated the goal by showing ten fingers twice and also pointed to the number 20 on his shirt to indicate that he had achieved 20 national team goals.

During a press conference on 31 March 2016, Antar announced that he would retire from international football after Lebanon's 2018 FIFA World Cup qualification match against Myanmar. Antar ended his international career with 20 goals in 65 appearances.

== Managerial career ==
=== Racing Beirut ===
In June 2017, Antar was appointed head coach of Lebanese club Racing Beirut. After two years in the Lebanese Premier League with the club, on 25 April 2019, Antar was suspended for one year by the Lebanese Football Association as he attacked the referee during the last game of the league, in a relegation battle against Tripoli which he lost 1–0.

=== Lebanon U23 ===
On 12 August 2020, Antar was appointed manager of the Lebanon national under-23 team.

=== Ahed ===
On 28 September 2020, Ahed announced that Antar became the club's head coach. On 3 January 2021, Antar submitted his resignation; in the first phase of the 2020–21 season, Ahed won four games, drew five, and lost two.

== Personal life ==
Antar speaks Arabic, German, English, and Chinese.

== Career statistics ==
=== Club ===
Appearances and goals by club, season and competition
Club	Season	League			National cup (Note: Includes Lebanese FA Cup, DFB-Pokal, Chinese FA Cup)		Continental		Total	
Club	Season	Division	Apps	Goals	Apps	Goals	Apps	Goals	Apps	Goals
Tadamon Sour	1998–99	Lebanese Premier League		1			—		1+	
Tadamon Sour	1999–2000	Lebanese Premier League		4			—		4+	
Tadamon Sour	2000–01	Lebanese Premier League		8			—		8+	
Tadamon Sour	Total			13			—		13+	
Hamburger SV (loan)	2001–02	Bundesliga	16	1	1	0	—		17	1
Hamburger SV (loan)	2002–03	Bundesliga	7	1	1	0	—		8	1
Hamburger SV (loan)	Total		23	2	2	0	—		25	2
Hamburger SV II (loan)	2001–02	Oberliga Hamburg/Schleswig-Holstein	14	10	—		—		14	10
Hamburger SV II (loan)	2002–03	Regionalliga Nord	6	1	—		—		6	1
Hamburger SV II (loan)	Total		20	11	—		—		20	11
SC Freiburg	2003–04	Bundesliga	17	7	1	0	—		18	7
SC Freiburg	2004–05	Bundesliga	27	3	3	0	—		30	3
SC Freiburg	2005–06	2. Bundesliga	22	6	1	1	—		23	7
SC Freiburg	2006–07	2. Bundesliga	32	10	2	3	—		34	13
SC Freiburg	Total		98	26	7	4	—		105	30
1. FC Köln	2007–08	2. Bundesliga	31	7	1	0	—		32	7
1. FC Köln	2008–09	Bundesliga	15	0	2	1	—		17	1
1. FC Köln	Total		46	7	3	1	—		49	8
Shandong Luneng Taishan	2009	Chinese Super League	27	7	—		—		27	7
Shandong Luneng Taishan	2010	Chinese Super League	29	8	—		6	0	35	8
Shandong Luneng Taishan	2011	Chinese Super League	30	9	3	0	5	0	38	9
Shandong Luneng Taishan	2012	Chinese Super League	13	4	2	0	—		15	4
Shandong Luneng Taishan	2013	Chinese Super League	29	8	1	0	—		30	8
Shandong Luneng Taishan	Total		128	36	6	0	11	0	140	36
Jiangsu Sainty	2014	Chinese Super League	29	5	4	1	—		33	6
Hangzhou Greentown	2015	Chinese Super League	27	1	0	0	—		27	1
Tadamon Sour	2016–17	Lebanese Premier League	16	6			—		16+	6+
Career total			387+	107	22+	6+	11	0	420+	113+

=== International ===
Appearances and goals by national team and year
National team	Year	Apps	Goals
Lebanon	1998	3	0
Lebanon	1999	6	0
Lebanon	2000	10	3
Lebanon	2001	7	6
Lebanon	2002	4	3
Lebanon	2003	0	0
Lebanon	2004	4	3
Lebanon	2005	0	0
Lebanon	2006	0	0
Lebanon	2007	2	1
Lebanon	2008	1	0
Lebanon	2009	2	0
Lebanon	2010	0	0
Lebanon	2011	4	1
Lebanon	2012	5	1
Lebanon	2013	5	0
Lebanon	2014	1	1
Lebanon	2015	7	1
Lebanon	2016	4	0
Total		65	20

Scores and results list Lebanon's goal tally first, score column indicates score after each Antar goal.

List of international goals scored by Roda Antar
No.	Date	Venue	Opponent	Score	Result	Competition
1	25 May 2000	King Abdullah Stadium, Amman, Jordan	Kyrgyzstan	2–0	2–0	2000 WAFF Championship
2	25 June 2000	Tripoli Municipal Stadium, Tripoli, Lebanon	Kuwait	2–1	3–1	Friendly
3	8 August 2000	Camille Chamoun Sports City Stadium, Beirut, Lebanon	Oman	1–1	1–2	Friendly
4	25 April 2001	Tripoli Municipal Stadium, Tripoli, Lebanon	Philippines	1–0	3–0	Friendly
5	15 May 2001	Beirut Municipal Stadium, Beirut, Lebanon	Sri Lanka	1–0	4–0	2002 FIFA World Cup qualifier
6	15 May 2001	Beirut Municipal Stadium, Beirut, Lebanon	Sri Lanka	2–0	4–0	2002 FIFA World Cup qualifier
7	17 May 2001	Beirut Municipal Stadium, Beirut, Lebanon	Thailand	1–0	1–2	2002 FIFA World Cup qualifier
8	26 May 2001	Suphachalasai Stadium, Bangkok, Thailand	Pakistan	3–1	8–1	2002 FIFA World Cup qualifier
9	26 May 2001	Suphachalasai Stadium, Bangkok, Thailand	Pakistan	4–1	8–1	2002 FIFA World Cup qualifier
10	24 December 2002	Al-Sadaqua Walsalam Stadium, Kuwait City, Lebanon	Yemen	1–0	4–2	2002 Arab Nations Cup
11	24 December 2002	Al-Sadaqua Walsalam Stadium, Kuwait City, Lebanon	Yemen	2–1	4–2	2002 Arab Nations Cup
12	24 December 2002	Al-Sadaqua Walsalam Stadium, Kuwait City, Lebanon	Yemen	3–1	4–2	2002 Arab Nations Cup
13	31 March 2004	Chùa Cuõi Stadium, Nam Định, Vietnam	Vietnam	1–0	2–0	2006 FIFA World Cup qualifier
14	9 June 2004	Beirut Municipal Stadium, Beirut, Lebanon	Maldives	2–0	3–0	2006 FIFA World Cup qualifier
15	8 September 2004	Rasmee Dhandu Stadium, Malé, Maldives	Maldives	5–0	5–2	2006 FIFA World Cup qualifier
16	8 October 2007	Saida Municipal Stadium, Sidon, Lebanon	India	1–1	4–1	2010 FIFA World Cup qualifier
17	6 September 2011	Camille Chamoun Sports City Stadium, Beirut, Lebanon	United Arab Emirates	3–1	3–1	2014 FIFA World Cup qualifier
18	11 September 2012	Camille Chamoun Sports City Stadium, Beirut, Lebanon	Iran	1–0	1–0	2014 FIFA World Cup qualifier
19	5 March 2014	Rajamangala Stadium, Bangkok, Thailand	Thailand	5–1	5–2	2015 AFC Asian Cup qualifier
20	12 November 2015	Saida Municipal Stadium, Sidon, Lebanon	Laos	2–0	7–0	2018 FIFA World Cup qualifier

== Honours ==
=== Player ===
Hamburger SV

- DFB-Ligapokal: 2003

SC Freiburg

- 2. Bundesliga: 2002–03

Shandong Luneng Taishan

- Chinese Super League: 2010

Individual

- IFFHS All-time Lebanon Men's Dream Team
- Lebanese Premier League Best Player: 2000–01
- Lebanese Premier League Team of the Season: 1999–2000, 2000–01

== See also ==
- List of Lebanon international footballers
- List of Lebanon international footballers born outside Lebanon
- List of association football families
