= Sergej Barbarez =

Bosnian football manager (born 1971)

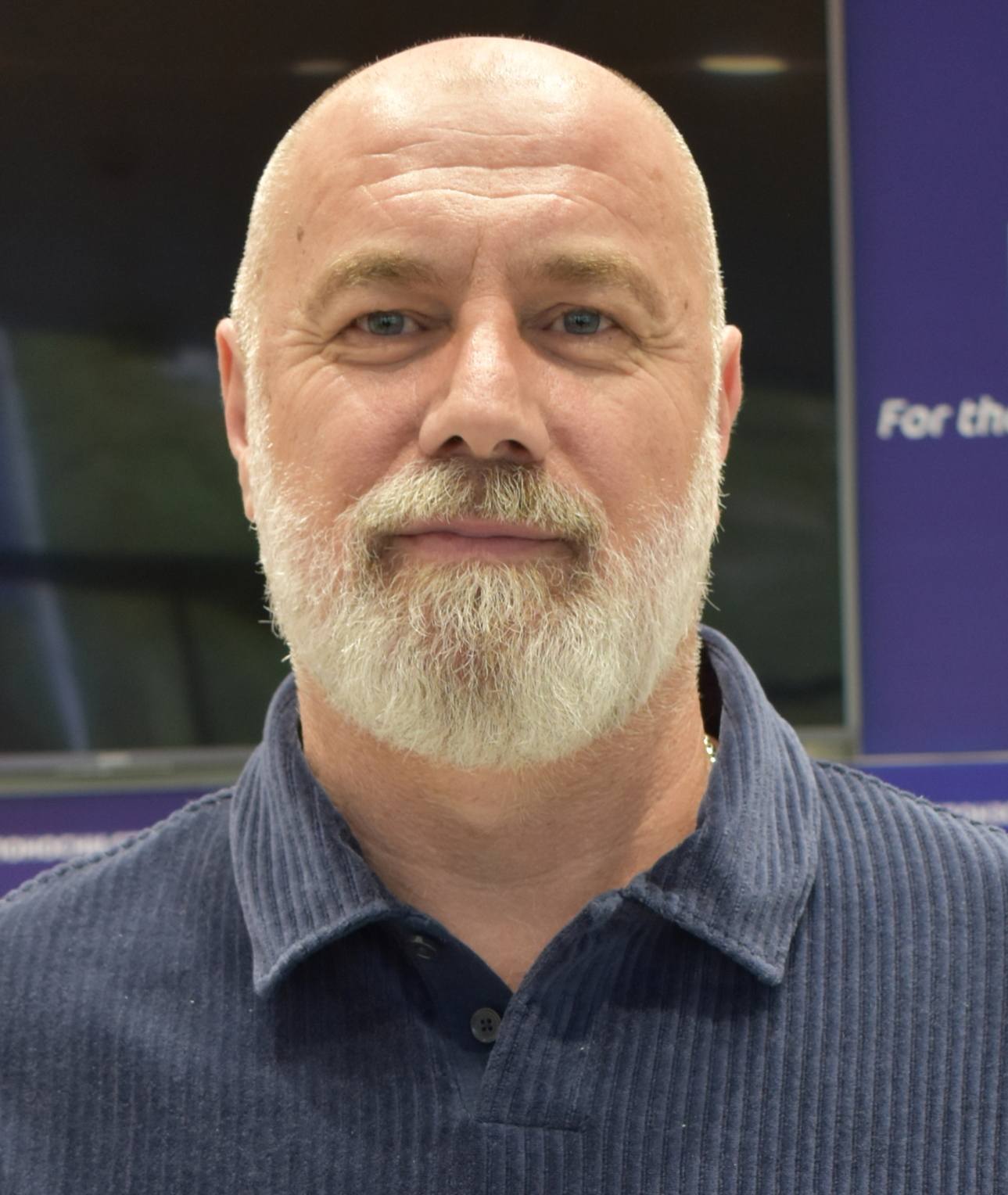
- Barbarez in 2024

Personal information
- Date of birth: 17 September 1971 (age 55)
- Place of birth: Mostar, SR Bosnia and Herzegovina, SFR Yugoslavia
- Height: 1.88 m (6 ft 2 in)
- Position: Forward

Team information
- Current team: Bosnia and Herzegovina (manager)

Youth career
- 1984–1989: Velež Mostar

Senior career*
Years	Team	Apps	(Gls)
1989–1991	Velež Mostar		
1992–1993	Hannover 96	18	(2)
1993–1996	Union Berlin	88	(46)
1996–1998	Hansa Rostock	59	(13)
1998–2000	Borussia Dortmund	36	(6)
2000–2006	Hamburger SV	174	(65)
2006–2008	Bayer Leverkusen	61	(11)
Total		436	(143)

International career
1998–2006	Bosnia and Herzegovina	47	(17)

Managerial career
- 2024–: Bosnia and Herzegovina
- * Club domestic league appearances and goals

Sergej Barbarez (born 17 September 1971) is a Bosnian professional football manager and former player who is the manager of the Bosnia and Herzegovina national team.

Mainly used as a second striker during his playing career, Barbarez was also deployed as an attacking midfielder or left winger. He started his career at hometown club Velež Mostar, before going to Germany and joining Hannover 96 in 1992. He went to Union Berlin a year later, and then played in the Bundesliga for Hansa Rostock and Borussia Dortmund. Barbarez joined Hamburger SV in 2000, and has since been considered one of the all-time greatest players of the club where he scored 65 goals in 174 Bundesliga games. In the 2000–01 Bundesliga season, he was joint top scorer with 22 goals alongside Ebbe Sand of Schalke 04 at the end of the season. Barbarez left Hamburg in 2006, and signed with Bayer Leverkusen, where he retired from professional football in 2008.

Barbarez made his senior international debut for the Bosnia and Herzegovina national team in 1998, earning 47 caps and scoring 17 goals until 2006. He was the captain of the national team between 2004 and 2006.

In April 2024, Barbarez was appointed as Bosnia and Herzegovina's head coach. He guided the nation to the 2026 FIFA World Cup, marking their first appearance at the finals since 2014.

== Early life ==
Barbarez was born in Mostar, SR Bosnia and Herzegovina, Yugoslavia, present-day Bosnia and Herzegovina. His father Ljubo Barbarez was a Bosnian Serb. His mother Zlata (née Košarić) was a handball player from Ljubuški. His maternal grandmother Ruža (née Tadinac) was a Croat from Trilj, and his Bosniak grandfather Omer Košarić was her second husband. In addition to him, Ljubo and Zlata also had a daughter, Maja, who also played handball.

Today, it can be said that my father made the right decision. If I had not gone to Germany, I would have gone to war. Aside from the fact that wars are always meaningless, the question arises: for whom or against what? My mother is from a marriage between a Croat and a Bosniak, and my father was a Serb. Religion and nationality never played a major role in my family.

— Sergej Barbarez on his ethnic identity and the Bosnian War

During his childhood, Barbarez was interested in track and field, naming 400 metres his specialty. However, due to the lack of resources in the former Yugoslavia, he resorted to football. In the winter of 1991, in the midst of the Yugoslav Wars, Barbarez was sent by his father to his maternal uncle in Hanover, as wars were already raging in Slovenia and Croatia. His father had mistakenly believed that the wars would not last and that Barbarez would return in a couple of weeks. However, as the Bosnian War continued, Barbarez remained in Germany permanently.

== Club career ==
In 1984, Barbarez took a step further and started playing football for the youth team of Velež in his native city of Mostar.

Some six years later, he signed with the first team of Velež at the age of 19. However, briefly after, Barbarez served in the Yugoslav People's Army in Zagreb in 1991 before returning to Mostar to continue his career. In 1991, he returned to Velež and soon after everyone realized that Barbarez was a true talent.

The same year, he visited his uncle who was living in Germany. Some time later, Barbarez was preparing to return to Mostar but his uncle surprised him by extending his stay in Germany for two weeks. The uncle had arranged for him a two-week try-out practise with Hannover 96. The coach of Hannover 96 was so impressed by Barbarez that he signed him for the club. During those same two weeks the political situation throughout the former Yugoslavia was deteriorating by the minute and fighting was even occurring in some places. Subsequently, Barbarez came to an agreement with his father to stay with his uncle in Germany for the foreseeable future.

In April 1992, the Bosnian War escalated in the city of Mostar. A month prior to the actual war, Barbarez's father and sister fled with his high school sweetheart Ana to the city of Hanover in Germany. His mother Zlata stayed in Mostar throughout the entire war.

Barbarez played for Hannover 96 during the second half of the 1991–92 and the whole 1992–93 season. Between 1993 and 1996, he played for Union Berlin at the third level before signing with Hansa Rostock. Barbarez played there between 1996 and 1998.

In 1998, he signed with Borussia Dortmund and played there until joining Hamburger SV in July 2000.

During the first season with Hamburger SV, Barbarez became the top scorer for his club with 22 goals and joint top scorer of the Bundesliga with Ebbe Sand. Though, he could not help Hamburg's elimination from the 2000–01 UEFA Champions League at the group stages despite his two goals, when the club qualified for that competition for the first time, after a third place in the previous domestic Bundesliga season.

On 17 May 2006, Barbarez signed a two-year deal with Bayer Leverkusen. He finished his career at Bayer after his contract with the club expired in June 2008.

== International career ==
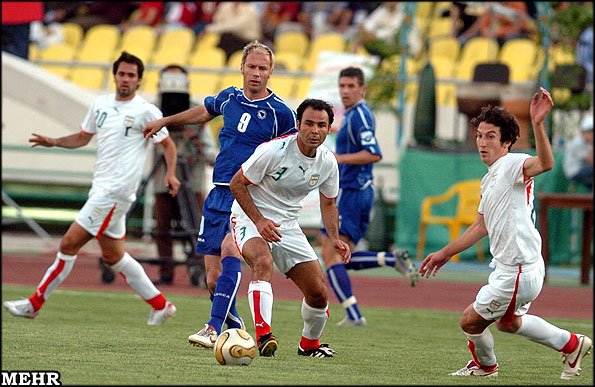
Barbarez playing for Bosnia and Herzegovina against Iran in 2006

Amid ethnically motivated threats, including attempted kidnappings and attempts on his mother's life, Barbarez stated that he would only represent Bosnia and Herzegovina once her safety had been assured, with protection ultimately guaranteed following political intervention. On 14 May 1998, he made his debut for the Bosnia and Herzegovina national team against Argentina in a friendly match.

Barbarez scored two goals against Liechtenstein in a World Cup qualification match on 28 March 2001. He was denied a hat-trick as his second-half penalty was saved by Lichtenstein goalkeeper Peter Jehle.

Before retiring from international football in October 2005, Barbarez was the captain of the Bosnian national team.

On 2 December 2005, he announced his comeback to the national team and played in the UEFA Euro 2008 qualifiers. He became captain of the team once again.

On 12 October 2006, Barbarez officially stepped down from playing for the Bosnia and Herzegovina national team and retired permanently from professional football in June 2008. His final international was an October 2006 European Championship qualification match against Moldova.

== Managerial career ==
Barbarez announced on 14 December 2009 that he wanted to be the head coach of the Bosnia and Herzegovina national team in the UEFA Euro 2012 qualifiers. However, the Football Association of Republika Srpska blocked his entry and later on, Safet Sušić was selected as the new head coach of the Bosnia and Herzegovina national team.

On 5 January 2011, Barbarez received his UEFA Pro Licence in the Football Association of Bosnia and Herzegovina's educational facility in Jablanica.

=== Bosnia and Herzegovina ===
On 19 April 2024, Barbarez was appointed as the new head coach of the Bosnia and Herzegovina national team, signing a four-year contract with the Bosnian FA. His first game in charge was a friendly 3–0 away defeat to England on 3 June 2024. He was victorious in the team's opening 2026 FIFA World Cup qualifying match against Romania on 21 March 2025. Bosnia and Herzegovina recorded three more wins against Cyprus, and back-to-back victories over San Marino, marking this their most successful FIFA World Cup or UEFA Euro qualification opening. Barbarez's side suffered its first defeat in the qualifying campaign on 9 September 2025, losing to Austria 2–1 at home.

Following a 3–1 win over Romania at home on 15 November, Bosnia and Herzegovina needed to defeat Austria three days later in the final group match to qualify directly for the World Cup. Despite holding on to a 1–0 lead until the 77th minute, the match ended in a draw. As a result, Barbarez's team finished second in the group, two points behind Austria, and qualified for the play-offs. On 26 March 2026, following a late Edin Džeko equaliser against Wales in the play-off semi-finals, Bosnia and Herzegovina managed to win on penalties and advance to the final against Italy. On 31 March, Bosnia and Herzegovina defeated Italy on penalties after a 1–1 draw in the play-off final, qualifying for the 2026 World Cup and marking their second appearance as an independent nation.

== Personal life ==
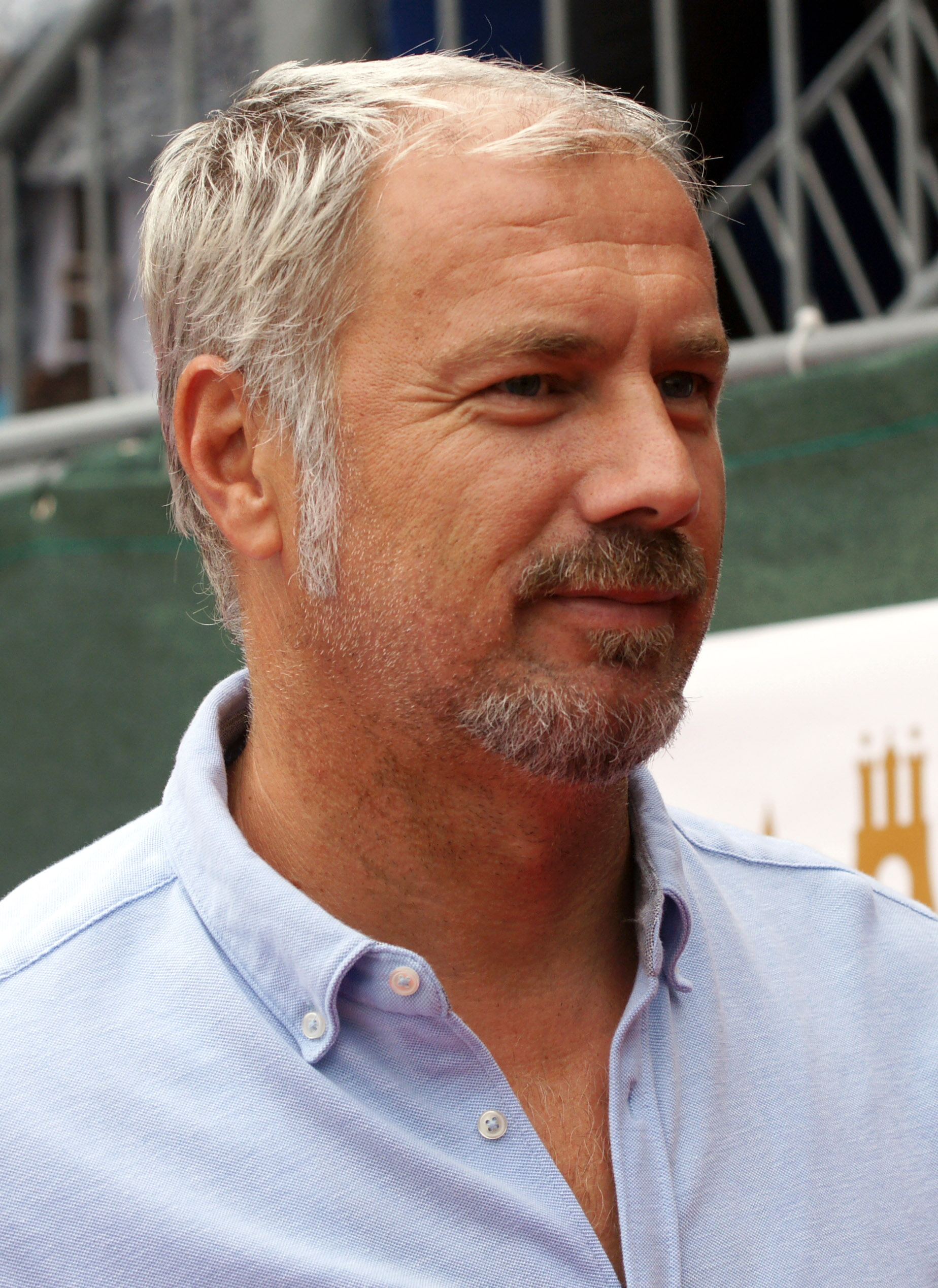
Barbarez in 2014

Barbarez is married to his high-school sweetheart Ana, who is also from Mostar. They have two sons together, Filip-André (born 1994) and Sergio-Luis (1999). Barbarez was a member of the board of directors of Hamburger SV between 25 January 2009 and 28 May 2010.

After retiring from football, Barbarez played poker professionally for 10 years.

== Career statistics ==
=== Club ===
Appearances and goals by club, season and competition
Club	Season	League			Cup		Continental		Total	
Club	Season	Division	Apps	Goals	Apps	Goals	Apps	Goals	Apps	Goals
Hannover 96	1992–93	2. Bundesliga	18	2	1	0	0	0	19	2
Union Berlin	1993–94	NOFV-Oberliga	29	15	0	0	0	0	29	15
Union Berlin	1994–95	Regionalliga	29	14	1	0	0	0	30	14
Union Berlin	1995–96	Regionalliga	30	17	0	0	0	0	30	17
Union Berlin	Total		88	46	1	0	0	0	89	46
Hansa Rostock	1996–97	Bundesliga	27	2	2	1	0	0	29	3
Hansa Rostock	1997–98	Bundesliga	32	11	1	0	0	0	33	11
Hansa Rostock	Total		59	13	3	1	0	0	62	14
Borussia Dortmund	1998–99	Bundesliga	22	4	2	0	0	0	24	4
Borussia Dortmund	1999–2000	Bundesliga	14	2	1	0	5	1	20	3
Borussia Dortmund	Total		36	6	3	0	5	1	44	7
Hamburger SV	2000–01	Bundesliga	31	22	1	0	8	1	40	23
Hamburger SV	2001–02	Bundesliga	24	7	1	0	0	0	25	7
Hamburger SV	2002–03	Bundesliga	24	6	1	0	0	0	25	6
Hamburger SV	2003–04	Bundesliga	32	10	3	0	2	0	37	10
Hamburger SV	2004–05	Bundesliga	30	11	1	0	0	0	31	11
Hamburger SV	2005–06	Bundesliga	33	9	3	3	9	2	45	14
Hamburger SV	Total		174	65	10	3	19	3	203	71
Bayer Leverkusen	2006–07	Bundesliga	32	7	2	0	12	3	46	10
Bayer Leverkusen	2007–08	Bundesliga	29	4	0	0	10	3	39	7
Bayer Leverkusen	Total		61	11	2	0	22	6	75	17
Career total			436	143	20	4	46	10	483	157

=== International ===
Appearances and goals by national team and year
National team	Year	Apps	Goals
Bosnia and Herzegovina	1998	5	1
Bosnia and Herzegovina	1999	3	0
Bosnia and Herzegovina	2000	4	0
Bosnia and Herzegovina	2001	5	4
Bosnia and Herzegovina	2002	2	2
Bosnia and Herzegovina	2003	7	4
Bosnia and Herzegovina	2004	5	0
Bosnia and Herzegovina	2005	9	3
Bosnia and Herzegovina	2006	7	3
Total		47	17

Scores and results list Bosnia and Herzegovina's goal tally first, score column indicates score after each Barbarez goal.

List of international goals scored by Sergej Barbarez
No.	Date	Venue	Opponent	Score	Result	Competition
1	5 September 1999	Koševo City Stadium, Sarajevo, Bosnia and Herzegovina	Estonia	1–1	1–1	UEFA Euro 2000 qualifying
2	28 February 2001	Bilino Polje, Zenica, Bosnia and Herzegovina	Hungary	1–1	1–1	Friendly
3	24 March 2001	Koševo City Stadium, Sarajevo, Bosnia and Herzegovina	Austria	1–1	1–1	2002 FIFA World Cup qualification
4	28 March 2001	Rheinpark Stadion, Vaduz, Liechtenstein	Liechtenstein	1–0	3–0	2002 FIFA World Cup qualification
5	28 March 2001	Rheinpark Stadion, Vaduz, Liechtenstein	Liechtenstein	2–0	3–0	2002 FIFA World Cup qualification
6	27 March 2002	Stadion Grbavica, Sarajevo, Bosnia and Herzegovina	Macedonia	2–0	4–4	Friendly
7	27 March 2002	Stadion Grbavica, Sarajevo, Bosnia and Herzegovina	Macedonia	3–0	4–4	Friendly
8	13 February 2003	Millennium Stadium, Cardiff, Wales	Wales	2–1	2–2	Friendly
9	29 March 2003	Bilino Polje, Zenica, Bosnia and Herzegovina	Luxembourg	2–0	2–0	UEFA Euro 2004 qualifying
10	2 April 2003	Parken Stadium, Copenhagen, Denmark	Denmark	1–0	2–0	UEFA Euro 2004 qualifying
11	10 September 2003	Stade Josy Barthel, Luxembourg City, Luxembourg	Luxembourg	1–0	1–0	UEFA Euro 2004 qualifying
12	4 June 2005	Stadio Olimpico, Serravalle, San Marino	San Marino	3–1	3–1	2006 FIFA World Cup qualification
13	3 September 2005	Bilino Polje, Zenica, Bosnia and Herzegovina	Belgium	1–0	1–0	2006 FIFA World Cup qualification
14	7 September 2005	LFF Stadium, Vilnius, Lithuania	Lithuania	1–0	1–0	2006 FIFA World Cup qualification
15	31 May 2006	Azadi Stadium, Tehran, Iran	Iran	2–0	2–5	Friendly
16	16 August 2006	Koševo City Stadium, Sarajevo, Bosnia and Herzegovina	France	1–0	1–2	Friendly
17	2 September 2006	National Stadium, Ta' Qali, Malta	Malta	1–0	5–2	UEFA Euro 2008 qualifying

== Managerial statistics ==
As of match played 17 November 2026

Managerial record by team and tenure
Team	Nat.	From	To	Record							
Team	Nat.	From	To	G	W	D	L	GF	GA	GD	Win %
Bosnia and Herzegovina	(Bosnia and Herzegovina)	19 April 2024	Present	32	12	9	11	44	49	−5	37.50
Career Total				32	12	9	11	44	49	−5	37.50

== Honours ==
=== Player ===
Hamburger SV

- DFB-Ligapokal: 2003
- UEFA Intertoto Cup: 2005

Individual

- Bosnian Footballer of the Year: 2001, 2002, 2003
- Bundesliga top goalscorer: 2000–01 (shared)
- Kicker Bundesliga Team of the Season: 2000–01
