= Tomáš Ujfaluši =

Czech footballer (born 1978)

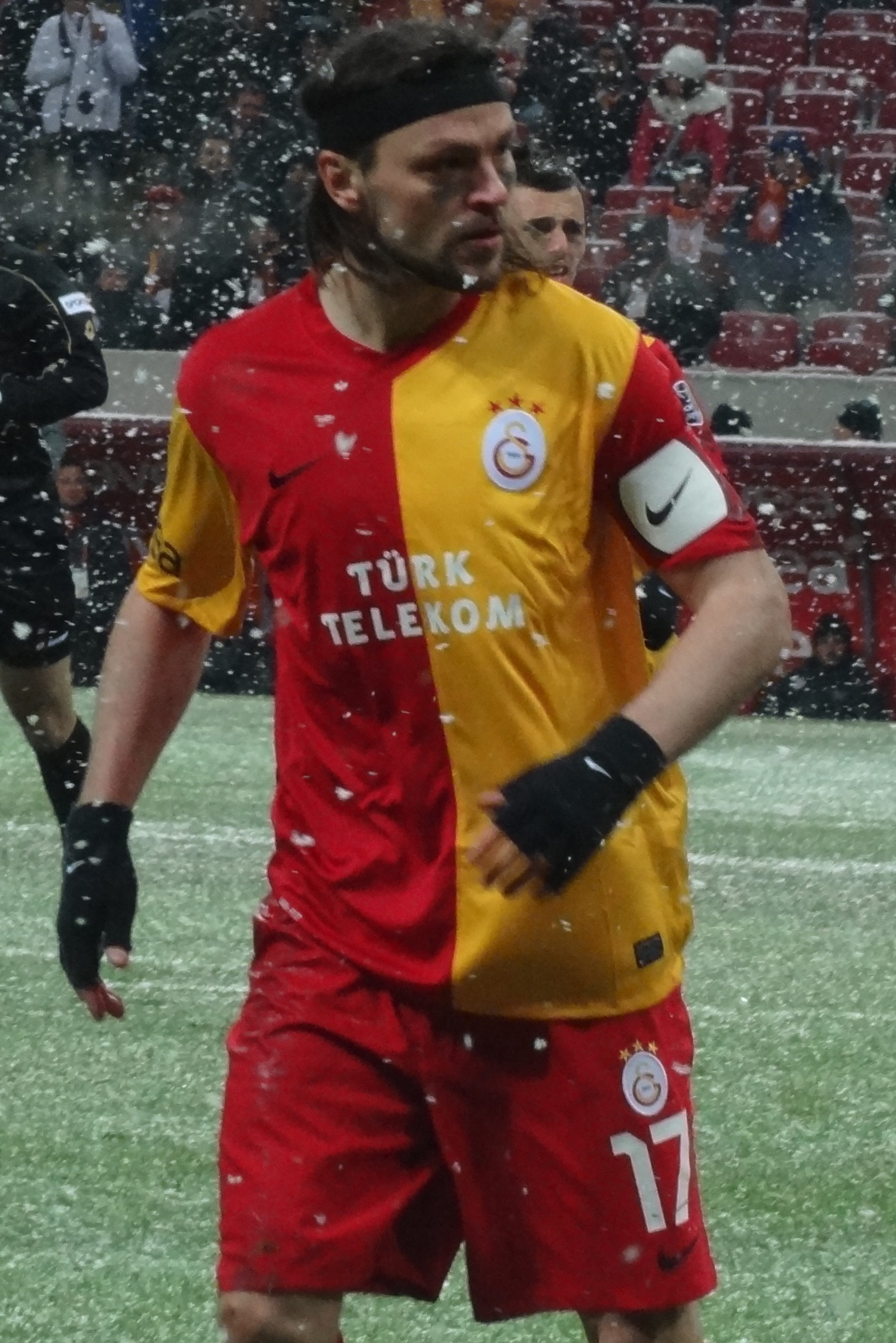
- Ujfaluši playing for Galatasaray in 2012

Personal information
- Full name: Tomáš Ujfaluši
- Date of birth: 24 March 1978 (age 48)
- Place of birth: Rýmařov, Czechoslovakia
- Height: 1.85 m (6 ft 1 in)
- Position: Defender

Youth career
- 1988–1991: TJ Rýmařov
- 1991–1996: Sigma Olomouc

Senior career*
| Years | Team | Apps | (Gls) |
| 1996–2000 | Sigma Olomouc | 100 | (4) |
| 2000–2004 | Hamburger SV | 105 | (2) |
| 2004–2008 | Fiorentina | 123 | (2) |
| 2008–2011 | Atlético Madrid | 92 | (0) |
| 2011–2013 | Galatasaray | 41 | (1) |
| 2013–2014 | Sparta Prague | 0 | (0) |
| Total | | 461 | (9) |

International career
| 1997–1999 | Czech Republic U21 | 26 | (0) |
| 2001–2009 | Czech Republic | 78 | (2) |
Medal record
Men's football
Representing Czech Republic
UEFA European Championship
| Bronze medal – third place | 2004 Portugal |
- * Club domestic league appearances and goals

Tomáš Ujfaluši (Czech pronunciation: [ˈtomaːʃ ˈujfaluʃɪ], born 24 March 1978) is a Czech former professional footballer. He operated as either a central defender or a right-back. Initially beginning his career with Sigma Olomouc in 1996, he played in Germany (four years), Italy (four), Spain (three), and Turkey (two) – winning six major titles between Hamburger SV, Atlético Madrid and Galatasaray – respectively. Ujfaluši earned 78 appearances for the Czech Republic, representing the country at the 2006 World Cup and two European Championships.

== Club career ==
Ujfaluši joined German side Hamburger SV in December 2000, taking the number 30 shirt and signing a four-and-a-half year contract. In 2004, Ujfaluši signed a four-year contract with Italian side Fiorentina for a fee of approximately €6.3 million.

=== Atlético Madrid ===
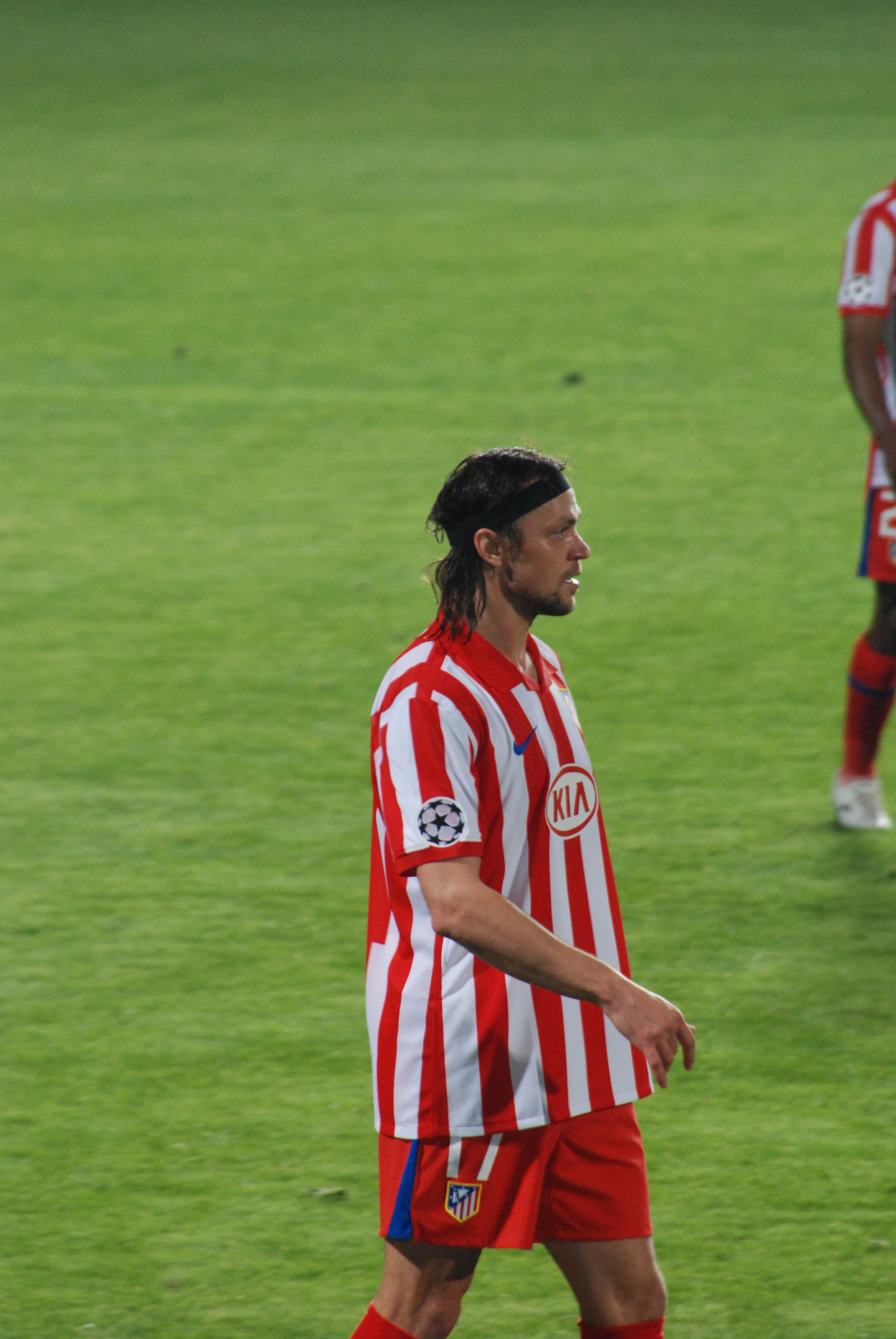
Ujfaluši playing for Atlético Madrid in 2009.

After nearly 150 official appearances for the Viola (albeit without silverware), being mainly used as a centre-back by coach Cesare Prandelli, Ujfaluši joined Atlético Madrid as a free agent. On 19 September 2010, during injury time of a 1–2 league loss against Barcelona at the Vicente Calderón Stadium, Ujfaluši made a late challenge on Lionel Messi, injuring his right ankle. The defender received a straight red card for his foul, and was subsequently banned for two games by the Spanish League's disciplinary committee.

=== Galatasaray ===
On 20 June 2011, aged 33, Ujfaluši signed for Süper Lig club Galatasaray, for a €2 million transfer fee. He was an undisputed starter in his first season, being sent off in the final game of the campaign – a goalless away draw against Fenerbahçe – as Gala won a record-equalling 18th league title. Ujfaluši left Galatasaray at the end of 2012–13 due to a long injury.

=== Sparta Prague ===
Ujfaluši returned to the Czech Republic and signed a one-year contract with Sparta Prague in August 2013, taking the number 3 shirt. He made his competitive debut for Sparta Prague in September 2013 in a Czech Cup third round match against Zlín of the second league. After a few months back in his homeland with Sparta Prague, he retired at the age of 35 on 2 December 2013. The same year on 18 December, Ujfaluši returned to Galatasaray, being appointed sporting director.

== International career ==
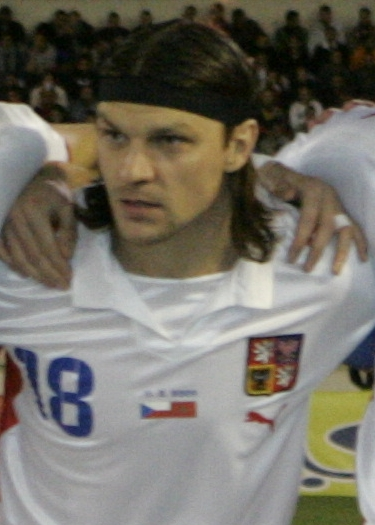
Ujfaluši with the Czech Republic national team (2009).

Ujfaluši debuted for the Czech senior squad during a friendly match against Macedonia in 2001. He represented the country at the UEFA Euro 2004 by appearing in four matches for the semifinalists and 2006 FIFA World Cup, being sent off in the latter tournament against Ghana in an eventual group stage exit. After nine years with the national team, during which he eventually gained captaincy, Ujfaluši ended his international career on 8 April 2009 after being criticised for visiting a restaurant, accompanied by five other players, following the Czech Republic's defeat against Slovakia earlier on 1 April in a World Cup qualification.

== Career statistics ==
=== Club ===
| Club | Season | League | | | National cup (Note: Includes Czech Cup, DFB-Pokal, Coppa Italia, Copa del Rey, Turkish Cup) | | Europe | | Other | | Total | |
| Club | Season | Division | Apps | Goals | Apps | Goals | Apps | Goals | Apps | Goals | Apps | Goals |
|---|---|---|---|---|---|---|---|---|---|---|---|---|
| Sigma Olomouc | 1996–97 | Czech First League | 18 | 1 | 0 | 0 | – | | – | | 18 | 1 |
| Sigma Olomouc | 1997–98 | Czech First League | 11 | 2 | 0 | 0 | – | | – | | 11 | 2 |
| Sigma Olomouc | 1998–99 | Czech First League | 28 | 1 | 0 | 0 | 4 (Note: Appearances in UEFA Cup) | 0 | – | | 32 | 1 |
| Sigma Olomouc | 1999–2000 | Czech First League | 29 | 0 | 0 | 0 | 3 | 0 | – | | 32 | 0 |
| Sigma Olomouc | 2000–01 | Czech First League | 14 | 0 | 0 | 0 | – | | – | | 14 | 0 |
| Sigma Olomouc | Total | | 100 | 4 | 0 | 0 | 7 | 0 | – | | 107 | 4 |
| Hamburg | 2000–01 | Bundesliga | 19 | 0 | – | | – | | – | | 19 | 0 |
| Hamburg | 2001–02 | Bundesliga | 29 | 0 | 1 | 0 | – | | – | | 30 | 0 |
| Hamburg | 2002–03 | Bundesliga | 31 | 2 | 3 | 0 | – | | – | | 34 | 2 |
| Hamburg | 2003–04 | Bundesliga | 26 | 0 | 3 | 0 | 2 | 0 | 2 (Note: Appearances in DFL-Ligapokal) | 0 | 33 | 0 |
| Hamburg | Total | | 105 | 2 | 7 | 0 | 2 | 0 | 2 | 0 | 115 | 2 |
| Fiorentina | 2004–05 | Serie A | 28 | 0 | 4 | 0 | – | | – | | 32 | 0 |
| Fiorentina | 2005–06 | Serie A | 36 | 1 | 5 | 0 | – | | – | | 41 | 1 |
| Fiorentina | 2006–07 | Serie A | 31 | 1 | 2 | 0 | – | | – | | 33 | 1 |
| Fiorentina | 2007–08 | Serie A | 28 | 0 | 2 | 0 | 13 | 0 | – | | 43 | 0 |
| Fiorentina | Total | | 123 | 2 | 13 | 0 | 13 | 0 | – | | 149 | 2 |
| Atlético Madrid | 2008–09 | La Liga | 33 | 0 | 1 | 1 | 7 (Note: Appearances in UEFA Champions League) | 0 | – | | 41 | 1 |
| Atlético Madrid | 2009–10 | La Liga | 27 | 0 | 9 | 1 | 14 (Note: Six appearances in UEFA Champions League, eight appearances in UEFA Europa League) | 0 | – | | 50 | 1 |
| Atlético Madrid | 2010–11 | La Liga | 32 | 0 | 5 | 0 | 4 (Note: Appearances in UEFA Europa League) | 0 | 1 (Note: Appearance in UEFA Super Cup) | 0 | 42 | 0 |
| Atlético Madrid | Total | | 92 | 0 | 15 | 2 | 25 | 0 | 1 | 0 | 133 | 2 |
| Galatasaray | 2011–12 | Süper Lig | 39 | 1 | 1 | 0 | – | | – | | 40 | 1 |
| Galatasaray | 2012–13 | Süper Lig | 2 | 0 | 0 | 0 | 0 | 0 | 0 | 0 | 2 | 0 |
| Galatasaray | Total | | 41 | 1 | 1 | 0 | 0 | 0 | 0 | 0 | 42 | 1 |
| Sparta Prague | 2013–14 | Czech First League | 0 | 0 | 2 | 0 | – | | – | | 2 | 0 |
| Career total | | | 461 | 9 | 38 | 2 | 47 | 0 | 3 | 0 | 549 | 11 |

=== International ===
Czech Republic
| Year | Apps | Goals |
| 2001 | 6 | 0 |
| 2002 | 8 | 2 |
| 2003 | 8 | 0 |
| 2004 | 12 | 0 |
| 2005 | 11 | 0 |
| 2006 | 11 | 0 |
| 2007 | 8 | 0 |
| 2008 | 12 | 0 |
| 2009 | 2 | 0 |
| Total | 78 | 2 |

| No. | Date | Venue | Opponent | Score | Result | Competition |
|---|---|---|---|---|---|---|
| 1 | 6 September 2002 | Stadion Letná, Prague, Czech Republic | FR Yugoslavia | 2–0 | 5–0 | Friendly |
| 2 | 6 September 2002 | Stadion Letná, Prague, Czech Republic | FR Yugoslavia | 4–0 | 5–0 | Friendly |

== Honours ==
Hamburger SV

- DFB-Ligapokal: 2003

Atlético Madrid

- UEFA Europa League: 2009–10
- UEFA Super Cup: 2010

Galatasaray

- Süper Lig: 2011–12, 2012–13
- Turkish Super Cup: 2012

Individual

- Fiorentina All-time XI
