= 2006–07 ACF Fiorentina season =

Fiorentina
2006–07 season
- President: Andrea Della Valle
- Manager: Cesare Prandelli
- Stadium: Stadio Artemio Franchi
- Serie A: 6th
- Coppa Italia: Second round
- Top goalscorer: League: Luca Toni, Adrian Mutu (16); All: Luca Toni, Adrian Mutu (16)
- Highest home attendance: 41,578 vs Milan (16 December 2006, Serie A)
- Average home league attendance: 29,880
Home colours	Away colours	Third colours

ACF Fiorentina had a fantastic season points-wise, scoring just a couple of points less than second-positioned Roma, but due to a 15-point penalty imposed on the club because of its involvement in the Calciopoli scandal, it missed out on the Champions League, and had to settle for 6th and a position in the 2007–08 UEFA Cup. New signing Adrian Mutu was able to compensate for Luca Toni not having such a spectacular season as the one before, and both players netted 16 goals. Goalkeeper Sébastien Frey also had a top-class season, conceding only 31 goals all year, despite having a defensive line without renowned stoppers.

== Players ==
=== Goalkeepers ===
- (France) Sébastien Frey
- (Romania) Bogdan Lobonț
- (Serbia) Vlada Avramov
- (Italy) Cristiano Lupatelli

=== Defenders ===
- (Denmark) Per Krøldrup
- (Italy) Dario Dainelli
- (Italy) Alessandro Gamberini
- (Italy) Alessandro Potenza
- (Brazil) Alex
- (Czech Republic) Tomáš Ujfaluši
- (Italy) Manuel Pasqual
- (Italy) Massimiliano Tagliani
- (Italy) Davide Brivio
- (Italy) Andrea Pierro

=== Midfielders ===
- (Italy) Marco Donadel
- (Brazil) Guly do Prado
- (Italy) Michele Pazienza
- (Italy) Fabio Liverani
- (Italy) Andrea Paolucci
- (Italy) Manuele Blasi
- (Italy) Riccardo Montolivo
- (Italy) Massimo Gobbi
- (Denmark) Martin Jørgensen
- (Serbia) Zdravko Kuzmanović
- (Italy) Danilo D'Ambrosio
- (Brazil) Filipe
- (Argentina) Mario Santana

=== Forwards ===
- (Italy) Christian Riganò
- (Romania) Adrian Mutu
- (Italy) Luca Toni
- (Italy) Samuel Di Carmine
- (Italy) Giampaolo Pazzini
- (France) Matthias Lepiller
- (Brazil) Reginaldo

== Competitions ==
=== Overall ===
Competition	Started round	Current position	Final position	First match	Last match
Serie A	Matchday 1	—	6th	9 September 2006	27 May 2007
Coppa Italia	First round	—	Second round	19 August 2006	23 August 2006

Last updated: 27 May 2007

=== Serie A ===
==== League table ====
Pos	Team	Pld	W	D	L	GF	GA	GD	Pts	Qualification or relegation
4	Milan (Note: Fiorentina were docked 15 points, Reggina 11 points, Milan 8 points and Lazio 3 points, all for involvement in the 2006 Italian football scandal.)	38	19	12	7	57	36	+21	61	Qualification to Champions League group stage (Note: Milan qualified for 2007–08 UEFA Champions League group stage instead of third qualifying round as the title holders.)
5	Palermo	38	16	10	12	58	51	+7	58	Qualification to UEFA Cup first round
6	Fiorentina	38	21	10	7	62	31	+31	58	Qualification to UEFA Cup first round
7	Empoli	38	14	12	12	42	43	−1	54	Qualification to UEFA Cup first round
8	Atalanta	38	12	14	12	56	54	+2	50	

Source: "Serie A 2006/2007 - 38. Round". worldfootball.net. 21 July 2025.
Rules for classification: 1) points; 2) goal difference; 3) number of goals scored.

==== Results summary ====
Overall								Home						Away					
Pld	W	D	L	GF	GA	GD	Pts	W	D	L	GF	GA	GD	W	D	L	GF	GA	GD
38	21	10	7	62	31	+31	73	15	2	2	44	12	+32	6	8	5	18	19	−1

Last updated: 27 May 2007.
Source: Competitive matches

==== Results by round ====
Round	1	2	3	4	5	6	7	8	9	10	11	12	13	14	15	16	17	18	19	20	21	22	23	24	25	26	27	28	29	30	31	32	33	34	35	36	37	38
Ground	H	A	H	A	H	A	H	A	H	A	H	A	A	H	A	H	A	H	A	A	H	A	H	A	H	A	H	A	H	A	H	H	A	H	A	H	A	H
Result	L	L	W	L	W	W	W	W	L	L	W	D	D	W	W	D	W	W	D	L	W	L	W	W	W	D	W	D	D	D	W	W	W	W	D	W	D	W
Position	20	20	20	20	20	20	19	19	20	20	19	18	18	18	16	16	15	14	14	15	13	13	13	12	8	9	7	7	8	7	7	7	7	6	7	5	5	5

Updated to match(es) played on 27 May 2007. Source: Competitive matches
A = Away; H = Home; W = Win; D = Draw; L = Loss

==== Matches ====
9 September 2006 1	Fiorentina	2–3	Internazionale	Florence
20:30 CEST (UTC+02:00)	Toni 68', 79', (yellow card) 68'; Donadel (yellow card) 81'; Pasqual (yellow card) 88'	Report	Cambiasso 11', 41'; Ibrahimović 61', (yellow card) 90+3'	Stadium: Stadio Artemio Franchi; Attendance: 41,334; Referee: Roberto Rosetti

17 September 2006 2	Livorno	1–0	Fiorentina	Livorno
15:00 CEST (UTC+02:00)	Lucarelli 58'; Amelia (yellow card) 77'	Report	Donadel (yellow card) 34'; Montolivo (yellow card) 70'; Pasqual (yellow card) 85' (red card) 85'	Stadium: Stadio Armando Picchi; Attendance: 10,964; Referee: Stefano Farina

20 September 2006 3	Fiorentina	1–0	Parma	Florence
20:30 CEST (UTC+02:00)	Mutu 17', (yellow card) 19'; Gobbi (yellow card) 58'; Toni (red card) 90+2'	Report	Coly (yellow card) 20'; Dessena (yellow card) 27'; Contini (yellow card) 41'; Paci (yellow card) 64'; Grella (yellow card) 85'	Stadium: Stadio Artemio Franchi; Attendance: 28,445; Referee: Tiziano Pieri

24 September 2006 4	Udinese	1–0	Fiorentina	Udine
20:30 CEST (UTC+02:00)	Muntari (yellow card) 27'; Natali (yellow card) 37'; Iaquinta 40'	Report	Potenza (yellow card) 12'; Jørgensen (yellow card) 42'	Stadium: Stadio Friuli; Attendance: 15,273; Referee: Mauro Bergonzi

1 October 2006 5	Fiorentina	3–0	Catania	Florence
15:00 CEST (UTC+02:00)	Blasi (yellow card) 19'; Ujfaluši (yellow card) 46'; Jørgensen 54'; Mutu (yellow card) 61'; Toni 79'; Dainelli 83'; Donadel (yellow card) 85'	Report	Biso (yellow card) 24' (yellow-red card) 36'; Sottil (yellow card) 29'; Corona (yellow card) 70'; Spinesi (yellow card) 76'; Stovini (red card) 81'	Stadium: Stadio Artemio Franchi; Attendance: 28,668; Referee: Andrea De Marco

15 October 2006 6	Empoli	1–2	Fiorentina	Empoli
15:00 CEST (UTC+02:00)	Lucchini (yellow card) 26'; Matteini 29', (yellow card) 33'; Saudati (yellow card) 35'; Raggi (yellow card) 39'	Report	Donadel (yellow card) 23'; Mutu (yellow card) 34', (goal) 67'; Santana (yellow card) 48'; Dainelli (yellow card) 58'; Liverani (yellow card) 58'; Toni 77'; Krøldrup (yellow card) 89'	Stadium: Stadio Carlo Castellani; Attendance: 11,783; Referee: Massimiliano Saccani

22 October 2006 7	Fiorentina	3–0	Reggina	Florence
15:00 CEST (UTC+02:00)	Mutu 31', (yellow card) 77'; Santana 43'; Blasi (yellow card) 45+2', (goal) 55'	Report	De León (yellow card) 29'; Lanzaro (yellow card) 37'	Stadium: Stadio Artemio Franchi; Attendance: 28,970; Referee: Luca Marelli

25 October 2006 8	Torino	0–1	Fiorentina	Turin
20:30 CEST (UTC+02:00)	De Ascentis (yellow card) 76'; Di Loreto (yellow card) 78'	Report	Jørgensen 13'; Liverani (yellow card) 50'	Stadium: Stadio Olimpico di Torino; Attendance: 20,652; Referee: Nicola Ayroldi

29 October 2006 9	Fiorentina	2–3	Palermo	Florence
15:00 CET (UTC+01:00)	Barzagli 32' (o.g.); Liverani (yellow card) 53'; Mutu 87'	Report	Bresciano (yellow card) 6'; Di Michele 9'; Biava (yellow card) 19'; Corini (yellow card) 73'; Amauri 80', 90'; Cassani (yellow card) 87'	Stadium: Stadio Artemio Franchi; Attendance: 34,050; Referee: Domenico Messina

5 November 2006 10	Roma	3–1	Fiorentina	Rome
20:30 CET (UTC+01:00)	Panucci (yellow card) 17'; Mexès (yellow card) 24'; De Rossi 38'; Taddei 49', 66'; Perrotta (yellow card) 85'	Report	Ujfaluši 15'; Mutu (yellow card) 45+1'	Stadium: Stadio Olimpico; Attendance: 37,585; Referee: Roberto Rosetti

11 November 2006 11	Fiorentina	3–1	Atalanta	Florence
18:00 CET (UTC+01:00)	Mutu 26'; Pazzini 89', 90+4'; Pasqual (yellow card) 90+4'	Report	Migliaccio 25', (yellow card) 37'; Doni (yellow card) 45+3'; Abeijón (yellow card) 88'	Stadium: Stadio Artemio Franchi; Attendance: 30,337; Referee: Andrea De Marco

19 November 2006 12	Ascoli	1–1	Fiorentina	Ascoli Piceno
15:00 CET (UTC+01:00)	Pesce (yellow card) 34'; Bjelanović 84'; Minieri (yellow card) 90+1'	Report	Mutu (yellow card) 15'; Potenza (yellow card) 45'; Toni 45+2'; Pazienza (yellow card) 77'	Stadium: Stadio Cino e Lillo Del Duca; Attendance: 9,825; Referee: Paolo Mazzoleni

26 November 2006 13	Siena	1–1	Fiorentina	Siena
15:00 CET (UTC+01:00)	Antonini 18'; Vergassola (yellow card) 28'; Locatelli (yellow card) 45+1'; Codrea (yellow card) 65'; Chiesa (yellow card) 75'	Report	Mutu 38'; Blasi (yellow card) 52'; Gamberini (yellow card) 78'; Pazzini (yellow card) 88'	Stadium: Stadio Artemio Franchi – Montepaschi Arena; Attendance: 13,886; Referee: Massimiliano Saccani

3 December 2006 14	Fiorentina	1–0	Lazio	Florence
15:00 CET (UTC+01:00)	Toni 15'; Ujfaluši (yellow card) 45'; Dainelli (yellow card) 47'	Report	Stendardo (yellow card) 38'; Ledesma (yellow card) 49'	Stadium: Stadio Artemio Franchi; Attendance: 30,178; Referee: Nicola Rizzoli

10 December 2006 15	Chievo	0–1	Fiorentina	Verona
15:00 CET (UTC+01:00)	Mandelli (yellow card) 10'; Marcolini (yellow card) 82'; Obinna (yellow card) 88'	Report	Dainelli (yellow card) 62'; Mutu 80'	Stadium: Stadio Marc'Antonio Bentegodi; Attendance: 9,509; Referee: Gianluca Paparesta

16 December 2006 16	Fiorentina	2–2	Milan	Florence
18:00 CET (UTC+01:00)	Mutu 20' (pen.), 76'; Krøldrup (yellow card) 28'; Dainelli (yellow card) 67'	Report	Gilardino 4', 90'; Pirlo (yellow card) 29'; Šimić (yellow card) 65'; Gattuso (yellow card) 82'; Cafu (yellow card) 87'	Stadium: Stadio Artemio Franchi; Attendance: 41,578; Referee: Massimiliano Saccani

20 December 2006 17	Cagliari	0–2	Fiorentina	Cagliari
20:30 CET (UTC+01:00)	Langella (yellow card) 30'; Fortin (yellow card) 32'	Report	Ujfaluši (yellow card) 21'; Toni 32', 75'; Blasi (yellow card) 50'; Gobbi (yellow card) 53'	Stadium: Stadio Sant'Elia; Referee: Oscar Girardi

23 December 2006 18	Fiorentina	4–0	Messina	Florence
15:00 CET (UTC+01:00)	Toni 18'; Potenza 22'; Mutu (yellow card) 32', (goal) 51'; Montolivo (yellow card) 44'; Liverani 45+2'	Report	Zoro (yellow card) 32' (yellow-red card) 45'	Stadium: Stadio Artemio Franchi; Attendance: 29,220; Referee: Mauro Bergonzi

14 January 2007 19	Sampdoria	0–0	Fiorentina	Genoa
15:00 CET (UTC+01:00)	Bazzani (yellow card) 69'	Report	Ujfaluši (yellow card) 36'; Montolivo (yellow card) 56'; Mutu (yellow card) 90+6'	Stadium: Stadio Luigi Ferraris; Attendance: 21,981; Referee: Gianluca Paparesta

21 January 2007 20	Internazionale	3–1	Fiorentina	Milan
15:00 CET (UTC+01:00)	Stanković 19', (yellow card) 79'; Adriano 24'; Burdisso (yellow card) 65'; Ibrahimović 70'	Report	Toni 5'; Potenza (yellow card) 74'; Montolivo (yellow card) 76'	Stadium: San Siro; Attendance: 61,391; Referee: Emidio Morganti

28 January 2007 21	Fiorentina	2–1	Livorno	Florence
15:00 CET (UTC+01:00)	Mutu (yellow card) 32'; Toni (yellow card) 39', (goal) 68'; Jørgensen 82'	Report	Lucarelli 27'; Passoni (yellow card) 45'; Morrone (yellow card) 55'	Stadium: Stadio Artemio Franchi; Attendance: 31,423; Referee: Paolo Bertini

11 February 2007 23	Fiorentina	2–0	Udinese	Florence
15:00 CET (UTC+01:00)	Reginaldo 16', (yellow card) 63'; Pazzini 44'; Jørgensen (yellow card) 46'; Blasi (yellow card) 89'	Report	Pinzi (yellow card) 29'	Stadium: Stadio Artemio Franchi; Attendance: 0 Referee: Nicola Ayroldi

18 February 2007 24	Catania	0–1	Fiorentina	Rimini
15:00 CET (UTC+01:00)	Minelli (yellow card) 19' (yellow-red card) 58'; Stovini (yellow card) 31'	Report	Mutu (yellow card) 31'; Toni 87'	Stadium: Stadio Romeo Neri; Attendance: 0 Referee: Antonio Danilo Giannoccaro

25 February 2007 25	Fiorentina	2–0	Empoli	Florence
15:00 CET (UTC+01:00)	Mutu 27'; Montolivo (yellow card) 38'; Blasi (yellow card) 45+2'; Toni 75'	Report	Ascoli (yellow card) 16'; Raggi (yellow card) 40'	Stadium: Stadio Artemio Franchi; Attendance: 23,900; Referee: Gianluca Paparesta

28 February 2007 26	Reggina	1–1	Fiorentina	Reggio Calabria
15:00 CET (UTC+01:00)	Lanzaro (yellow card) 10'; Bianchi (yellow card) 45+1'; Foggia 57'; Giosa (yellow card) 61'; Aronica (yellow card) 86'	Report	Liverani (yellow card) 16'; Pazienza (yellow card) 25'; Montolivo (yellow card) 66'; Mutu 87' (pen.)	Stadium: Stadio Oreste Granillo; Attendance: 10,471; Referee: Nicola Rizzoli

4 March 2007 27	Fiorentina	5–1	Torino	Florence
15:00 CET (UTC+01:00)	Toni 31', 34'; Blasi (yellow card) 36'; Franceschini 52' (o.g.); Gamberini 74', 83'; Pazzini (yellow card) 87'	Report	Rosina 15'; Bovo (yellow card) 20'; De Ascentis (yellow card) 66'; Franceschini (yellow card) 85'; Brevi (yellow card) 87'; Balestri (yellow card) 89'	Stadium: Stadio Artemio Franchi; Attendance: 23,900; Referee: Mauro Bergonzi

11 March 2007 28	Palermo	1–1	Fiorentina	Palermo
15:00 CET (UTC+01:00)	Di Michele (yellow card) 36'; Zaccardo (yellow card) 38' (yellow-red card) 70'; Cavani 72'	Report	Ujfaluši (yellow card) 23'; Mutu 33'; Toni (yellow card) 71'	Stadium: Stadio Renzo Barbera; Attendance: 22,476; Referee: Domenico Messina

18 March 2007 29	Fiorentina	0–0	Roma	Florence
15:00 CET (UTC+01:00)	Dainelli (yellow card) 11' (yellow-red card) 33'; Mutu (yellow card) 70'	Report	Mexès (yellow card) 32'; De Rossi (yellow card) 89'	Stadium: Stadio Artemio Franchi; Attendance: 23,900; Referee: Gianluca Paparesta

1 April 2007 30	Atalanta	2–2	Fiorentina	Bergamo
15:00 CEST (UTC+02:00)	Loria (yellow card) 31', (goal) 39'; Donati (yellow card) 45'; Ventola (yellow card) 54'; Doni 66' (pen.)	Report	Reginaldo 27'; Blasi (yellow card) 30'; Pazzini 32' (pen.); Pasqual (yellow card) 54'	Stadium: Stadio Atleti Azzurri d'Italia; Attendance: 13,035; Referee: Roberto Rosetti

7 April 2007 31	Fiorentina	4–0	Ascoli	Florence
15:00 CEST (UTC+02:00)	Reginaldo 5'; Montolivo 45+1'; Toni 56'; Krøldrup 70'; Ujfaluši (yellow card) 79'	Report	Fini (yellow card) 40'; Foglio (yellow card) 59'; Minieri (yellow card) 63'; Di Biagio (yellow card) 75'	Stadium: Stadio Artemio Franchi; Attendance: 29,123; Referee: Andrea De Marco

15 April 2007 32	Fiorentina	1–0	Siena	Florence
15:00 CEST (UTC+02:00)	Mutu 43'; Gamberini (yellow card) 45' (yellow-red card) 69'; Pazienza (yellow card) 90+2'	Report	Codrea (yellow card) 36'; Gastaldello (yellow card) 41'; Rossi (yellow card) 90+3'	Stadium: Stadio Artemio Franchi; Attendance: 33,467; Referee: Stefano Farina

18 April 2007 22	Parma	2–0	Fiorentina	Parma
20:30 CEST (UTC+02:00)	Rossi 27', 89' (pen.); Parravicini (yellow card) 60'; Dessena (yellow card) 66'; Bucci (yellow card) 90'	Report	Dainelli (yellow card) 52'; Krøldrup (yellow card) 58'; Blasi (yellow card) 90+4'	Stadium: Stadio Ennio Tardini; Attendance: 17,822; Referee: Antonio Danilo Giannoccaro

22 April 2007 33	Lazio	0–1	Fiorentina	Rome
15:00 CEST (UTC+02:00)	Mutarelli (yellow card) 61'; Rocchi (yellow card) 62'	Report	Montolivo (yellow card) 48'; Toni (yellow card) 52'; Pasqual (yellow card) 62'; Mutu 71'; Pazzini (yellow card) 73'; Reginaldo (yellow card) 90+3'	Stadium: Stadio Olimpico; Attendance: 25,723; Referee: Massimiliano Saccani

28 April 2007 34	Fiorentina	1–0	Chievo	Florence
20:30 CEST (UTC+02:00)	Reginaldo 64'	Report	Mantovani (yellow card) 28'; Rickler (yellow card) 80'	Stadium: Stadio Artemio Franchi; Attendance: 30,724; Referee: Luca Banti

6 May 2007 35	Milan	0–0	Fiorentina	Milan
15:00 CEST (UTC+02:00)		Report	Gamberini (yellow card) 25'; Liverani (yellow card) 58'; Blasi (yellow card) 66'; Mutu (yellow card) 90'	Stadium: San Siro; Attendance: 55,078; Referee: Roberto Rosetti

13 May 2007 36	Fiorentina	1–0	Cagliari	Florence
15:00 CEST (UTC+02:00)	Pazzini 7'; Mutu (yellow card) 24'; Pazienza (yellow card) 88'	Report	Biondini (yellow card) 76'; López (yellow card) 88'; Langella (yellow card) 90+5'	Stadium: Stadio Artemio Franchi; Attendance: 19,312; Referee: Antonio Danilo Giannoccaro

20 May 2007 37	Messina	2–2	Fiorentina	Messina
15:00 CEST (UTC+02:00)	Candela (yellow card) 34'; Paoletti (yellow card) 46'; D'Aversa (yellow card) 65'; Riganò 81', 88' (pen.)	Report	Pazzini 25' (pen.); Gamberini 57'; Ujfaluši (yellow card) 90+1'	Stadium: Stadio San Filippo; Attendance: 10,648; Referee: Massimiliano Velotto

27 May 2007 38	Fiorentina	5–1	Sampdoria	Florence
15:00 CEST (UTC+02:00)	Mutu 5'; Montolivo 36'; Pazzini 49'; Ujfaluši (yellow card) 68'; Reginaldo 72', 90+1', (yellow card) 73'	Report	Franceschini (yellow card) 8'; Sala (yellow card) 17'; Quagliarella 40'; Accardi (yellow card) 86'	Stadium: Stadio Artemio Franchi; Attendance: 29,312; Referee: Giorgio Lops

=== Coppa Italia ===
19 August 2006 First round	Fiorentina	3–0	Giarre	Florence
20:30 CEST (UTC+02:00)	Santana 46'; Pazzini 71', 77'			Stadium: Stadio Artemio Franchi; Attendance: 16,075; Referee: Francesco Squillace

23 August 2006 Second round	Genoa	1–0	Fiorentina	Genoa
20:45 CEST (UTC+02:00)	Greco 75'			Stadium: Stadio Luigi Ferraris; Attendance: 16,783; Referee: Nicola Rizzoli
