= Ma Xingyu =

Chinese footballer (born 1989)

Ma Xingyu 马兴煜
Personal information
- Full name: Ma Xingyu
- Date of birth: November 4, 1989 (age 37)
- Place of birth: Qingdao, Shandong, China
- Height: 1.80 m (5 ft 11 in)
- Position: Midfielder

Team information
- Current team: Tai'an Tiankuang (assistant coach)

Youth career
- 1999–2007: Shandong Luneng

Senior career*
| Years | Team | Apps | (Gls) |
| 2007–2013 | Shandong Luneng | 8 | (0) |
| 2013 | → Qingdao Hainiu (loan) | 12 | (2) |
| 2014–2017 | Qingdao Huanghai | 98 | (2) |
| 2018–2022 | Henan Songshan Longmen | 69 | (2) |
| 2023–2024 | Qingdao Hainiu | 22 | (0) |

Managerial career
- 2026–: Tai'an Tiankuang (assistant)
- * Club domestic league appearances and goals as of 20:51, 28 February 2023 (UTC)

Ma Xingyu (simplified Chinese: 马兴煜; traditional Chinese: 馬興煜; pinyin: Mǎ Xīngyù; born 4 November 1989 in Qingdao, Shandong) is a Chinese retired professional football player who played as a midfielder.

== Club career ==
Ma Xingyu was a graduate of the Shandong Luneng under-19 youth team and was promoted to the senior team on December 26, 2007, in preparation for the 2008 league season. He would eventually go on to make his debut on September 6, 2009, when he came on as a substitute in a league game against Qingdao Jonoon in a 3–1 defeat.

Ma moved to third tier club Qingdao Hainiu as a loan player on July 22, 2013, for the remainder of the season to gain some playing time. His time at the club would see him gain promotion and win the division title, which lead to a permanent move. In the following campaign he would establish himself as an integral member of the team that helped the club finish twelfth and keep the club within the division.

On 27 February 2018, Ma transferred to Chinese Super League club Henan Jianye. He would make his debut for the club on March 2, 2018, in a league game against Tianjin Quanjian that ended in a 4–0 defeat. After five seasons at Henan he would return to Qingdao with the 1990 founded Qingdao Hainiu on 22 February 2023, for the start of the 2023 Chinese Super League season.

== Coaching career ==
On 6 March 2026, Ma was named as the assistant coach of China League Two club Tai'an Tiankuang.

== Career statistics ==
Statistics accurate as of match played 28 February 2023.

| Club | Season | League | | | National Cup | | Continental | | Other | | Total | |
| Club | Season | Division | Apps | Goals | Apps | Goals | Apps | Goals | Apps | Goals | Apps | Goals |
|---|---|---|---|---|---|---|---|---|---|---|---|---|
| Shandong Luneng | 2008 | Chinese Super League | 0 | 0 | – | | – | | – | | 0 | 0 |
| Shandong Luneng | 2009 | Chinese Super League | 1 | 0 | – | | 0 | 0 | – | | 1 | 0 |
| Shandong Luneng | 2010 | Chinese Super League | 0 | 0 | – | | 1 | 0 | – | | 1 | 0 |
| Shandong Luneng | 2011 | Chinese Super League | 0 | 0 | 0 | 0 | 0 | 0 | – | | 0 | 0 |
| Shandong Luneng | 2012 | Chinese Super League | 7 | 0 | 0 | 0 | – | | – | | 7 | 0 |
| Shandong Luneng | Total | | 8 | 0 | 0 | 0 | 1 | 0 | 0 | 0 | 9 | 0 |
| Qingdao Hainiu (loan) | 2013 | China League Two | 12 | 2 | – | | – | | – | | 12 | 2 |
| Qingdao Huanghai | 2014 | China League One | 23 | 0 | 4 | 0 | – | | – | | 27 | 0 |
| Qingdao Huanghai | 2015 | China League One | 21 | 1 | 0 | 0 | – | | – | | 21 | 1 |
| Qingdao Huanghai | 2016 | China League One | 27 | 0 | 1 | 0 | – | | – | | 28 | 0 |
| Qingdao Huanghai | 2017 | China League One | 27 | 1 | 0 | 0 | – | | – | | 27 | 1 |
| Qingdao Huanghai | Total | | 98 | 2 | 5 | 0 | 0 | 0 | 0 | 0 | 103 | 2 |
| Henan Jianye | 2018 | Chinese Super League | 24 | 1 | 0 | 0 | – | | – | | 24 | 1 |
| Henan Jianye | 2019 | Chinese Super League | 2 | 1 | 1 | 0 | – | | – | | 3 | 1 |
| Henan Jianye | 2020 | Chinese Super League | 15 | 0 | 1 | 0 | – | | – | | 16 | 0 |
| Henan Jianye | 2021 | Chinese Super League | 11 | 0 | 6 | 2 | – | | – | | 17 | 2 |
| Henan Jianye | 2022 | Chinese Super League | 17 | 1 | 1 | 0 | – | | – | | 18 | 1 |
| Henan Jianye | Total | | 69 | 3 | 9 | 2 | 0 | 0 | 0 | 0 | 78 | 5 |
| Career total | | | 187 | 7 | 14 | 2 | 1 | 0 | 0 | 0 | 202 | 9 |

== Honours ==
=== Club ===
Shandong Luneng

- Chinese Super League: 2008

Qingdao Hainiu

- China League Two: 2013
