= Fabiano (footballer, born 1982) =

Brazilian footballer

Personal information
- Full name: Fabiano Medina da Silva
- Date of birth: 18 January 1982 (age 44)
- Place of birth: Ribeirão Preto, Brazil
- Height: 1.92 m (6 ft 4 in)
- Position: Centre-back

Senior career*
Years	Team	Apps	(Gls)
2000–2001	Vitória	10	(3)
2001–2003	Atalanta	0	(0)
2002–2003	→ Alzano Virescit (loan)	5	(0)
2003–2005	Spezia	41	(0)
2005–2006	Lucchese	26	(0)
2006–2007	Monza	37	(5)
2007–2011	Lecce	122	(4)
2011–2013	Shandong Luneng	25	(2)
2014–2015	Martina Franca	31	(1)
2015–	Padova	0	(0)
- * Club domestic league appearances and goals as of 16 july 2015

Fabiano Medina da Silva (born 18 January 1982 in Ribeirão Preto), simply known as Fabiano (Brazilian Portuguese: [faˈbjɐnu]), is a former Brazilian footballer who currently last played for Calcio Padova.

== Career ==
Fabiano started his career at Vitória. he then signed by Atalanta and spent time in their youth team. He then played for some Serie C1 clubs, before signed by Lecce, on 30 August 2007 in join-ownership bid. He soon gained a place in the starting eleven.
