= Xia Ningning =

Chinese footballer

Xia Ningning 夏宁宁
Personal information
- Full name: Xia Ningning
- Date of birth: 4 January 1987 (age 39)
- Place of birth: Qingdao, Shandong, China
- Height: 1.75 m (5 ft 9 in)
- Positions: Left midfielder; left back

Youth career
- 1999–2007: Shandong Luneng

Senior career*
Years	Team	Apps	(Gls)
2007–2013	Shandong Luneng	31	(0)
2014–2016	Tianjin Songjiang	51	(2)
2017–2018	Shanghai Shenxin	2	(0)
2020-2022	Jinan Xingzhou	2	(0)

International career
2006	China U20	?	(?)

Managerial career
- 2019-2024: Jinan Xingzhou (Vice Managing Director)
- * Club domestic league appearances and goals as of 3 November 2018

Xia Ningning (simplified Chinese: 夏宁宁; traditional Chinese: 夏寧寧; pinyin: Xià Níngníng; born 4 January 1987 in Qingdao, Shandong) is a Chinese former football player.

== Club career ==
Xia Ningning made his senior club debut on 25 June 2008 for Shandong Luneng as a substitute in a league game vs. Changsha Ginde in a 1–0 victory. Due to his ability to play on the left side of the pitch he would be used as a versatile substitute throughout the season and gained himself a league title medal at the end of the season. On 11 January 2014, Xia transferred to China League One side Tianjin Songjiang.

On 16 February 2017, Xia transferred to League One side Shanghai Shenxin.

== Honours ==
Shandong Luneng

- Chinese Super League: 2008, 2010

Tianjin Songjiang

- China League One: 2016
