= 2011 Shandong Luneng Taishan F.C. season =

Shandong Luneng
- Chairman: (China) Sun Guoyu
- Manager: (Croatia) Branko Ivanković (Croatia) Rajko Magić (Portugal) Manuel Barbosa
- Super League: 5th
- FA Cup: Runner-up
- AFC Champions League: Group stage
Home colours	Away colours

The 2011 Shandong Luneng Taishan F.C. season involved Shandong competing in the 2011 Chinese Super League, 2011 Chinese FA Cup, 2011 AFC Champions League. The team qualified for the AFC Champions League after winning the 2010 Chinese Super League.

== Competitions ==
=== AFC Champions League ===
Group G	Pld	W	D	L	GF	GA	GD	Pts
(South Korea) Jeonbuk Hyundai Motors	6	5	0	1	14	2	+12	15
(Japan) Cerezo Osaka	6	4	0	2	11	4	+7	12
(China) Shandong Luneng	6	2	1	3	9	8	+1	7
(Indonesia) Arema	6	0	1	5	2	22	−20	1

2 March 2011	Jeonbuk Hyundai Motors (South Korea)	1 – 0	(China) Shandong Luneng	Jeonju World Cup Stadium, Jeonju
19:00 UTC+09:00	Park Won-Jae 59'	Report		Attendance: 3,826; Referee: Peter Green (Australia)

16 March 2011	Shandong Luneng (China)	2 – 0	(Japan) Cerezo Osaka	Shandong Stadium, Jinan
15:30 UTC+08:00	Renato Silva 22'; Wang Yongpo 32'	Report		Attendance: 20,821; Referee: Khalil Al Ghamdi (Saudi Arabia)

5 April 2011	Arema (Indonesia)	1 – 1	(China) Shandong Luneng	Kanjuruhan Stadium, Malang
15:30 UTC+07:00	Fakhruddin 90+3' (pen.)	Report	Obina 8'	Attendance: 5,600; Referee: Alireza Faghani (Iran)

20 April 2011	Shandong Luneng (China)	5 – 0	(Indonesia) Arema	Shandong Stadium, Jinan
15:30 UTC+08:00	Deng Zhuoxiang 25'; Obina 44'; Han Peng 71'; Mozhapa 81'; Wang Yongpo 90+2'	Report		Attendance: 10,059; Referee: Ali Al Badwawi (UAE)

3 May 2011	Shandong Luneng (China)	1 – 2	(South Korea) Jeonbuk Hyundai Motors	Shandong Stadium, Jinan
19:30 UTC+08:00	Zhou Haibin 40'	Report	Lee Dong-Gook 31', 53'	Attendance: 17,343; Referee: Saeid Mozaffarizadeh (Iran)

10 May 2011	Cerezo Osaka (Japan)	4 – 0	(China) Shandong Luneng	Nagai Stadium, Osaka
19:00 UTC+09:00	Rodrigo Pimpão 39'; Kiyotake 47'; Inui 73'; Kurata 81'	Report		Attendance: 9,035; Referee: Abdullah Balideh (Qatar)
