= Marcel Ketelaer =

German footballer

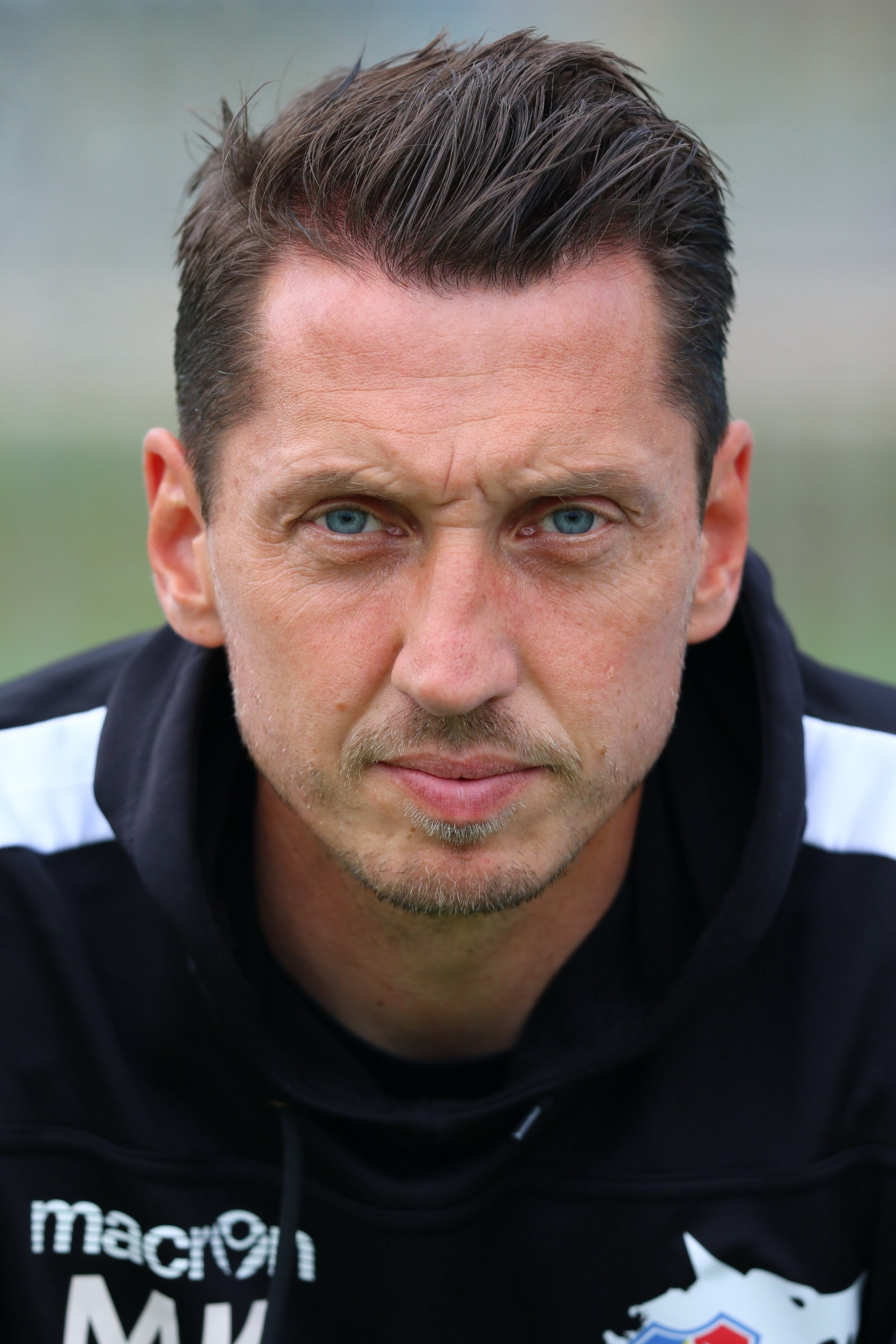
- ketelaer in 2018

Personal information
- Date of birth: 3 November 1977 (age 48)
- Place of birth: Mönchengladbach, West Germany
- Height: 1.73 m (5 ft 8 in)
- Position: Striker

Team information
- Current team: Admira Wacker Mödling (sporting director)

Youth career
- 1984–1995: Borussia Mönchengladbach

Senior career*
Years	Team	Apps	(Gls)
1996–2000	Borussia M'gladbach	84	(11)
2000–2002	Hamburger SV	29	(3)
2002–2003	→ Borussia M'gladbach (loan)	19	(0)
2003–2004	Borussia M'gladbach	7	(0)
2004–2005	1. FC Nürnberg	4	(0)
2005–2006	Rot Weiss Ahlen	14	(0)
2006–2007	FC Superfund	39	(7)
2007–2008	SK Austria Kärnten	6	(0)
2008–2009	SK Rapid Wien	12	(0)
2010–2011	FC Pasching	29	(2)

International career
1997–1999	Germany U-21	10	(3)

Managerial career
- 2012–2013: FC Blau-Weiß Linz II (player-coach)
- 2013–2014: FC Blau-Weiß Linz (assistant)
- 2014: SK Vorwärts Steyr (assistant)
- 2014–2015: SK Vorwärts Steyr
- 2015–2016: ASKÖ Oedt
- 2017–2018: SKN St. Pölten (assistant)
- 2017: SKN St. Pölten (caretaker)
- 2018–2020: SKN St. Pölten (coordinator)
- 2018: SKN St. Pölten (caretaker)
- 2021–: Admira Wacker Mödling (sporting director)
- * Club domestic league appearances and goals

Marcel Ketelaer (born 3 November 1977) is a German professional football coach and a former striker. He is the sporting director for Admira Wacker Mödling.
