= Jan Sandmann =

German footballer

Personal information
- Date of birth: 3 May 1978 (age 48)
- Place of birth: Burg bei Magdeburg, East Germany
- Height: 1.86 m (6 ft 1 in)
- Position: Defender

Youth career
- SG Blau-Weiß Niegripp
- 1. FC Magdeburg

Senior career*
Years	Team	Apps	(Gls)
1996–2000	1. FC Magdeburg		
2000–2002	Hamburger SV	6	(0)
2002–2004	1. FC Union Berlin	53	(1)
2004–2010	Holstein Kiel	85	(6)
- * Club domestic league appearances and goals

Jan Sandmann (born 3 May 1978 in Burg bei Magdeburg, East Germany) is a German former football player.

== Career ==
He made his debut on the professional league level in the Bundesliga for Hamburger SV on 23 September 2000 when he came on as a substitute in the 67th minute in a game against VfL Wolfsburg. He also played in the UEFA Champions League qualification games against Brøndby IF that season, as well as UEFA Cup matches against A.S. Roma.
