= Mahmut Yılmaz =

German footballer

Personal information
- Date of birth: 6 October 1979 (age 47)
- Place of birth: Hamburg, West Germany
- Height: 1.80 m (5 ft 11 in)
- Position: Forward

Youth career
- –1997: Vorwärts/Wacker 04 Billstedt
- 1997–1998: Hamburger SV

Senior career*
Years	Team	Apps	(Gls)
1998–2003	Hamburger SV (A)	121	(41)
1999–2003	Hamburger SV	13	(0)
2003–2006	Manisaspor	27	(11)
2006–2007	Türk Telekomspor		
2008–2010	Eintracht Norderstedt		

International career
1999–2001	Germany U-21	16	(4)
- * Club domestic league appearances and goals

Mahmut Yılmaz (born 6 October 1979) is a German former professional footballer who played as a forward. He also holds Turkish citizenship.

== Career ==
Yılmaz joined Eintracht Norderstedt in January 2008.
