= Carsten Wehlmann =

German footballer

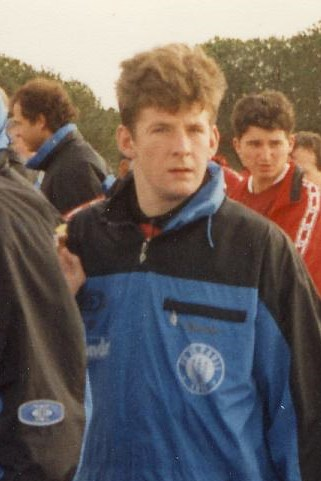
- Wehlmann in the 1995–96 season

Personal information
- Date of birth: 27 June 1972 (age 53)
- Place of birth: Germany
- Height: 1.91 m (6 ft 3 in)
- Position: Goalkeeper

Senior career*
Years	Team	Apps	(Gls)
–1994	Eidelstedter SV		
1994–1995	VfL 93 Hamburg	24	(0+)
1995–2000	FC St Pauli	52	(0)
2000–2002	Hamburger SV II	1	(0)
2002	→ Hannover 96 (loan)	3	(0)
2003–2007	VfB Lübeck	27	(0)
- * Club domestic league appearances and goals

Carsten Wehlmann (born 27 June 1972) is a German former professional footballer who played as a goalkeeper.

== Career ==
Wehlmann joined 2. Bundesliga club FC St Pauli from Regionalliga Nord side VfL 93 Hamburg in November 1995. At FC St. Pauli, he started out as third-choice keeper behind Klaus Thomforde and Frank Böse.
