= Benjamin Kruse (footballer) =

German footballer

Personal information
- Date of birth: 4 May 1978 (age 48)
- Place of birth: Hamburg, West Germany
- Height: 1.85 m (6 ft 1 in)
- Position: Defender

Youth career
- Bramfelder SV

Senior career*
Years	Team	Apps	(Gls)
1998–2000	1. SC Norderstedt		
2000–2001	Hamburger SV	2	(0)
2002–2003	SC Freiburg	18	(0)
2003–2005	MSV Duisburg	6	(0)
2005–2008	ASV Bergedorf 85	24	(0)
- * Club domestic league appearances and goals

Benjamin Kruse (born 4 May 1978 in Hamburg) is a German former professional footballer who played as a defender. He made his debut on the professional league level in the Bundesliga for Hamburger SV on 28 October 2000 when he came on as a substitute in the 63rd minute in a game against SpVgg Unterhaching.
