= 2002 FIFA World Cup qualification – AFC second round =

International football competition

The AFC second round of 2002 FIFA World Cup qualification was contested between the ten group winners from the first round split across two groups.

The top country in each group at the end of the stage progressed to the 2002 FIFA World Cup, with the two runners-up facing each other in the third round (play-off). The winner of this play-off went on to compete for a place in the World Cup in the UEFA–AFC inter-confederation play-off.

== Group A ==
Pos	Team	Pld	W	D	L	GF	GA	GD	Pts	Qualification	Saudi Arabia national football team	Iran national football team	Bahrain national football team	Iraq national football team	Thailand national football team
1	Saudi Arabia	8	5	2	1	17	8	+9	17	2002 FIFA World Cup	—	2–2	1–1	1–0	4–1
2	Iran	8	4	3	1	10	7	+3	15	Third round	2–0	—	0–0	2–1	1–0
3	Bahrain	8	2	4	2	8	9	−1	10		0–4	3–1	—	2–0	1–1
4	Iraq	8	2	1	5	9	10	−1	7		1–2	1–2	1–0	—	4–0
5	Thailand	8	0	4	4	5	15	−10	4		1–3	0–0	1–1	1–1	—

17 August 2001
20:00 UTC+04

Iraq	4–0	Thailand
H. Mohammed 23', 76'; E. Mohammed 70'; Hussein 86'	Report

Al-Shaab Stadium, Baghdad
Attendance: 20,000
Referee: Masayoshi Okada (Japan)
17 August 2001
20:30 UTC+03

Saudi Arabia	1–1	Bahrain
Al-Dosari 84'	Report	Salmeen 18'

Prince Faisal bin Fahd Stadium, Riyadh
Attendance: 45,000
Referee: Saad Kamil Al-Fadhli (Kuwait)

23 August 2001
18:30 UTC+03

Bahrain	2–0	Iraq
Yousef 58'; Al Kuwari 82'	Report

Bahrain National Stadium, Manama
Attendance: 35,000
Referee: Khaled Dalu (Syria)

Note: After Iraq's defeat in this match, seven of their players were imprisoned and beaten under order by Uday Hussein.

24 August 2001
19:15 UTC+04:30

Iran	2–0	Saudi Arabia
Daei 54' (pen.), 64'	Report

Azadi Stadium, Tehran
Attendance: 120,000
Referee: Simon Micallef (Australia)

31 August 2001
20:30 UTC+03

Saudi Arabia	1–0	Iraq
Al-Dosari 45'	Report

Bahrain National Stadium, Manama (Bahrain)
Attendance: 10,000
Referee: Lu Jun (China)
1 September 2001
18:30 UTC+07

Thailand	0–0	Iran
	Report

Rajamangala Stadium, Bangkok
Attendance: 30,000
Referee: Ali Bujsaim (United Arab Emirates)

6 September 2001
18:30 UTC+03

Bahrain	1–1	Thailand
Al-Dossari 16'	Report	Kiatisuk 64'

Bahrain National Stadium, Manama
Attendance: 35,000
Referee: Kim Tae-Young (South Korea)
7 September 2001
20:00 UTC+04

Iraq	1–2	Iran
E. Mohammed 20'	Report	Karimi 30'; Daei 84'

Al-Shaab Stadium, Baghdad
Attendance: 40,000
Referee: Felipe Ramos Rizo (Mexico)

14 September 2001
17:30 UTC+04:30

Iran	0–0	Bahrain
	Report

Azadi Stadium, Tehran
Attendance: 50,000
Referee: Subkhiddin Mohd Salleh (Malaysia)
15 September 2001
18:30 UTC+07

Thailand	1–3	Saudi Arabia
Seksan 28'	Report	Al-Jaber 47'; Bin Shehan 63'; Al-Dosari 70'

Rajamangala Stadium, Bangkok
Attendance: 18,000
Referee: Naotsugu Fuse (Japan)

21 September 2001
18:30 UTC+03

Bahrain	0–4	Saudi Arabia
	Report	Al-Dosari 26'; Bin Shehan 28'; Al-Waked 41'; Al-Jaber 89'

Bahrain National Stadium, Manama
Attendance: 35,000
Referee: Ali Bujsaim (United Arab Emirates)
22 September 2001
18:30 UTC+07

Thailand	1–1	Iraq
Sutee 38'	Report	E. Mohammed 63'

Rajamangala Stadium, Bangkok
Attendance: 17,000
Referee: Sun Baojie (China)

28 September 2001
20:00 UTC+04

Iraq	1–0	Bahrain
E. Mohammed 10'	Report

Al-Shaab Stadium, Baghdad
Attendance: 15,000
Referee: Kim Young-Joo (South Korea)
28 September 2001
20:30 UTC+03

Saudi Arabia	2–2	Iran
Al-Waked 20' (pen.); Al-Yami 59'	Report	Daei 42'; Dinmohammadi 84'

Prince Abdullah al-Faisal Stadium, Jeddah
Attendance: 30,000
Referee: Carlos Eugênio Simon (Brazil)

5 October 2001
16:00 UTC+03:30

Iran	1–0	Thailand
Vahedi Nikbakht 32'	Report

Azadi Stadium, Tehran
Attendance: 75,000
Referee: Taj Addin Fares (Syria)
5 October 2001
18:00 UTC+03

Iraq	1–2	Saudi Arabia
Al-Hail 31'	Report	Bin Shehan 1', 77'

Amman International Stadium, Amman (Jordan)
Attendance: 17,000
Referee: Óscar Ruiz (Colombia)

12 October 2001
16:00 UTC+03:30

Iran	2–1	Iraq
Mahdavikia 27'; Karimi 71'	Report	Chathir 52'

Azadi Stadium, Tehran
Attendance: 100,000
Referee: Kim Young-Joo (South Korea)
16 October 2001
15:30 UTC+07

Thailand	1–1	Bahrain
Worrawoot 21'	Report	Ali 90+3'

Rajamangala Stadium, Bangkok
Attendance: 20,000
Referee: Halim Abdul Hamid (Malaysia)

Note: This match was originally scheduled for 13 October 2001 and started normally, but was interrupted at 25 minutes with Bahrain leading 1–0 due to an electrical fire at Rajamangala Stadium.

21 October 2001
20:30 UTC+03

Saudi Arabia	4–1	Thailand
Bin Shehan 40'; Jumaan 50'; Al-Jaber 66' (pen.); Al-Harbi 73'	Report	Seksan 58'

Prince Faisal bin Fahd Stadium, Riyadh
Attendance: 27,000
Referee: Brian Hall (United States)
21 October 2001
20:30 UTC+03

Bahrain	3–1	Iran
Al-Marzooqi 8'; Ali 45'; Husain 90'	Report	Daei 82'

Bahrain National Stadium, Manama
Attendance: 25,000
Referee: Carlos Batres (Guatemala)

== Group B ==
Pos	Team	Pld	W	D	L	GF	GA	GD	Pts	Qualification	China national football team	United Arab Emirates national football team	Uzbekistan national football team	Qatar national football team	Oman national football team
1	China	8	6	1	1	13	2	+11	19	2002 FIFA World Cup	—	3–0	2–0	3–0	1–0
2	United Arab Emirates	8	3	2	3	10	11	−1	11	Third round	0–1	—	4–1	0–2	2–2
3	Uzbekistan	8	3	1	4	13	14	−1	10		1–0	0–1	—	2–1	5–0
4	Qatar	8	2	3	3	10	10	0	9		1–1	1–2	2–2	—	0–0
5	Oman	8	1	3	4	7	16	−9	6		0–2	1–1	4–2	0–3	—

16 August 2001
19:00 UTC+03

Qatar	0–0	Oman
	Report

Khalifa International Stadium, Doha
Attendance: 15,000
Referee: Abdulhameed Ebrahim (Bahrain)
17 August 2001
19:30 UTC+04

United Arab Emirates	4–1	Uzbekistan
Salem Ali 21'; Al-Kuwaiti 33' (pen.); Al-Shamsi 45'; Bakhit 85'	Report	Shirshov 37'

Sheikh Zayed Stadium, Abu Dhabi
Attendance: 15,000
Referee: Kim Young-Joo (South Korea)

25 August 2001
19:30 UTC+08

China	3–0	United Arab Emirates
Li Xiaopeng 2'; Qi Hong 19'; Hao Haidong 33'	Report

Wulihe Stadium, Shenyang
Attendance: 46,000
Referee: Mongkol Rungklay (Thailand)
26 August 2001
19:00 UTC+05

Uzbekistan	2–1	Qatar
Irismetov 36'; Qosimov 52'	Report	Jalouf 88'

Pakhtakor Markaziy Stadium, Tashkent
Attendance: 40,000
Referee: Shamsul Maidin (Singapore)

31 August 2001
19:15 UTC+04

Oman	0–2	China
	Report	Qi Hong 70'; Fan Zhiyi 84' (pen.)

Sultan Qaboos Sports Complex, Muscat
Attendance: 35,000
Referee: Ahmad Khalidi Supian (Malaysia)
31 August 2001
19:15 UTC+04

United Arab Emirates	0–2	Qatar
	Report	Hashim 65'; Al-Obaidly 71'

Sheikh Zayed Stadium, Abu Dhabi
Attendance: 20,000
Referee: Abdul Rahman Al-Zaid (Saudi Arabia)

7 September 2001
19:00 UTC+03

Qatar	1–1	China
Al Naemi 31'	Report	Li Weifeng 89'

Khalifa International Stadium, Doha
Attendance: 30,000
Referee: Toru Kamikawa (Japan)
8 September 2001
19:00 UTC+05

Uzbekistan	5–0	Oman
Irismetov 17', 73'; Shatskikh 38' (pen.); Qosimov 50', 67'	Report

Pakhtakor Markaziy Stadium, Tashkent
Attendance: 25,000
Referee: Masoud Moradi (Iran)

14 September 2001
19:00 UTC+04

Oman	1–1	United Arab Emirates
Nairooz 52'	Report	Al Anbari 13'

Sultan Qaboos Sports Complex, Muscat
Attendance: 3,000
Referee: Hassan Marshoud (Jordan)
15 September 2001
19:30 UTC+08

China	2–0	Uzbekistan
Li Weifeng 63'; Fan Zhiyi 76'	Report

Wulihe Stadium, Shenyang
Attendance: 44,376
Referee: Kwon Jong-Chul (South Korea)

21 September 2001
19:00 UTC+04

Oman	0–3	Qatar
	Report	Hamzah 26'; Mustafa 33'; Al Enazi 74'

Sultan Qaboos Sports Complex, Muscat
Attendance: 3,000
Referee: Qasem Shaban (Kuwait)
22 September 2001
19:00 UTC+05

Uzbekistan	0–1	United Arab Emirates
	Report	Mohammad Omar 5'

Pakhtakor Markaziy Stadium, Tashkent
Attendance: 42,000
Referee: Masayoshi Okada (Japan)

27 September 2001
18:45 UTC+04

United Arab Emirates	0–1	China
	Report	Qi Hong 43'

Sheikh Zayed Stadium, Abu Dhabi
Attendance: 15,000
Referee: Peter Prendergast (Jamaica)
28 September 2001
19:00 UTC+03

Qatar	2–2	Uzbekistan
Al Enazi 9'; Hashim 89'	Report	Qosimov 45'; Shirshov 47'

Khalifa International Stadium, Doha
Attendance: 6,000
Referee: Mongkol Rungklay (Thailand)

4 October 2001
19:00 UTC+03

Qatar	1–2	United Arab Emirates
Hamzah 47'	Report	Khalil 43'; Salem Ali 84'

Khalifa International Stadium, Doha
Attendance: 8,000
Referee: Abdul Aziz A. Al Dokhail (Saudi Arabia)
7 October 2001
19:30 UTC+08

China	1–0	Oman
Yu Genwei 36'	Report

Wulihe Stadium, Shenyang
Attendance: 45,000
Referee: Shamsul Maidin (Singapore)

13 October 2001
18:30 UTC+04

Oman	4–2	Uzbekistan
Al-Mukhaini 50', 83'; Bashir 52'; Al-Mahruqy 89'	Report	Davletov 5'; Ashoor 27' (o.g.)

Sultan Qaboos Sports Complex, Muscat
Attendance: 400
Referee: Masayoshi Okada (Japan)
13 October 2001
19:30 UTC+08

China	3–0	Qatar
Su Maozhen 11'; Qu Bo 29'; Hao Haidong 57'	Report

Wulihe Stadium, Shenyang
Attendance: 43,850
Referee: Benito Archundia (Mexico)

19 October 2001
18:30 UTC+04

United Arab Emirates	2–2	Oman
Ibrahim 45'; Omar 60'	Report	Mubarak 22'; Al-Dhabit 41'

Sheikh Zayed Stadium, Abu Dhabi
Attendance: 40,000
Referee: Ali Abdulla Mandani (Kuwait)
19 October 2001
19:30 UTC+05

Uzbekistan	1–0	China
Shirshov 90'	Report

Pakhtakor Markaziy Stadium, Tashkent
Attendance: 15,000
Referee: Rodrigo Badilla (Costa Rica)

== Goalscorers ==
There were 102 goals scored in 40 matches, for an average of 2.55 goals per match.

5 goals

- (Iran) Ali Daei
- (Saudi Arabia) Abdullah Bin Shehan

4 goals

- (Iraq) Emad Mohammed
- (Saudi Arabia) Obeid Al-Dosari
- (Uzbekistan) Mirjalol Qosimov

3 goals

- (China) Qi Hong
- (Saudi Arabia) Sami Al-Jaber
- (Uzbekistan) Jafar Irismetov
- (Uzbekistan) Nikolay Shirshov

2 goals

- (Bahrain) Husain Ali
- (China) Fan Zhiyi
- (China) Hao Haidong
- (China) Li Weifeng
- (Iran) Ali Karimi
- (Iraq) Hesham Mohammed
- (Oman) Yaqoob Juma Al-Mukhaini
- (Qatar) Mohammed Salem Al-Enazi
- (Qatar) Waleed Hamzah
- (Qatar) Ahmad Khalifa Hashim
- (Saudi Arabia) Abdullah Al-Waked
- (Thailand) Seksan Piturat
- (United Arab Emirates) Mohammad Omar
- (United Arab Emirates) Yaser Salem Ali

1 goal

- (Bahrain) Ghazi Al Kuwari
- (Bahrain) Khaled Al-Dossari
- (Bahrain) Abdulla Al-Marzooqi
- (Bahrain) Mohammed Husain
- (Bahrain) Mohamed Salmeen
- (Bahrain) Talal Yousef
- (China) Li Xiaopeng
- (China) Qu Bo
- (China) Su Maozhen
- (China) Yu Genwei
- (Iran) Sirous Dinmohammadi
- (Iran) Mehdi Mahdavikia
- (Iran) Alireza Vahedi Nikbakht
- (Iraq) Abdul-Wahab Abu Al-Hail
- (Iraq) Qahtan Chathir
- (Iraq) Laith Hussein
- (Oman) Hani Al-Dhabit
- (Oman) Badar Al-Mahruqy
- (Oman) Fawzi Bashir
- (Oman) Taqi Mubarak
- (Oman) Radhwan Nairooz
- (Qatar) Dahi Al Naemi
- (Qatar) Abdulnasser Al-Obaidly
- (Qatar) Abdulaziz Hassan Bujaloof
- (Qatar) Mubarak Mustafa
- (Saudi Arabia) Ibrahim Al-Harbi
- (Saudi Arabia) Al Hasan Al-Yami
- (Saudi Arabia) Abdullah Jumaan Al-Dosari
- (Thailand) Kiatisuk Senamuang
- (Thailand) Sutee Suksomkit
- (Thailand) Worrawoot Srimaka
- (United Arab Emirates) Abdulaziz Al Anbari
- (United Arab Emirates) Zuhair Bakhit
- (United Arab Emirates) Fahad Ali Al-Shamsi
- (United Arab Emirates) Gharib Al-Kuwaiti
- (United Arab Emirates) Abdulrahman Ibrahim
- (United Arab Emirates) Faisal Khalil
- (Uzbekistan) Fevzi Davletov
- (Uzbekistan) Maxim Shatskikh

1 own goal

- (Oman) Nabil Ashoor (against Uzbekistan)
