= List of home stadiums of China national football team =

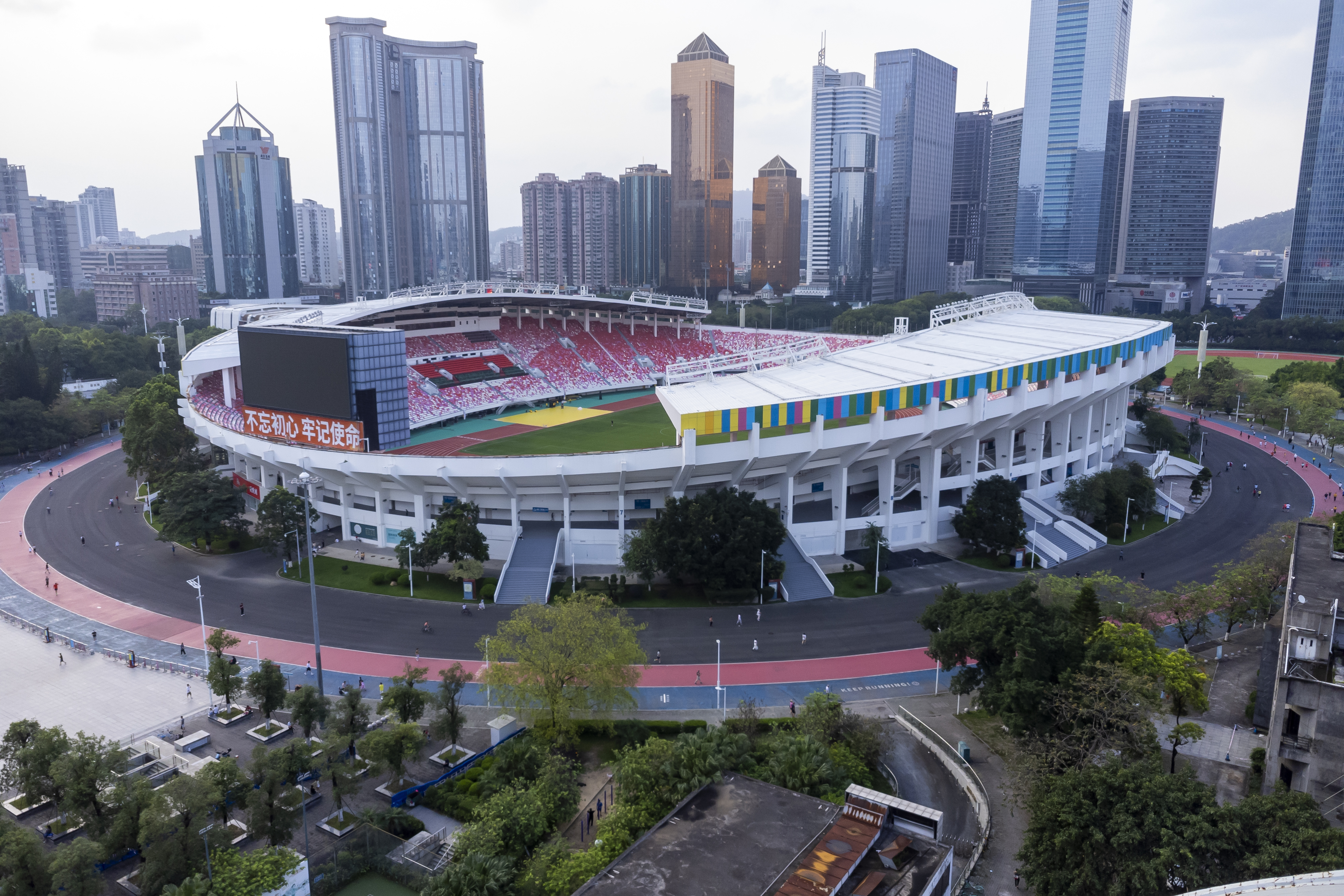
Tianhe Stadium

This list contains home stadiums that China national football team have used in international competitions / qualifications.

== Background ==
=== Stadium ===
China plays in various stadiums in the country, and doesn't have a permanent home stadium.

The former Workers' Stadium, opened in 1959, located in the Chaoyang District in north-eastern Beijing, was the most renowned one. Its capacity is 66,161, and it covers a land area of 350,000 square meters. It is used both for international matches and by the China Super League team, the Beijing Guoan, and for the national team. However, China also plays in other stadiums around the country. Tuodong Stadium on the city of Kunming has the capacity of 40,000 and was used in previous 2010 and 2014 World Cup campaigns. Yellow Dragon Sports Center in Hangzhou served as China's main stadium for the 2011 AFC Asian Cup qualification and Shaanxi Province Stadium in Xi'an served as Team Dragon's main stadium for the 2015 AFC Asian Cup qualification.

Previously, Shenyang's Wulihe Stadium was served as the base for China's historic 2002 FIFA World Cup campaign, which saw China qualified, and their only, World Cup appearance.

In smaller tournaments like EAFF E-1 Football Championship, Chongqing Olympic Sports Center in Chongqing, and Wuhan Sports Center Stadium in Wuhan were used as home stadiums for Team Dragon. The recent China Cup also represents Guangxi Sports Center in Nanning as the team's main stadium. Some friendlies are also played in Tianhe Stadium in Guangzhou.

== Home stadiums ==
As of 21 November 2023

Location		Home stadium	Capacity	Competitions (include qualifications)	Notes
Beijing	Chaoyang	Workers' Stadium	65,094	2004 AFC Asian Cup; Football at the 1990 Asian Games – Men; 1998 FIFA World Cup qualification (AFC); 1986 FIFA World Cup qualification (AFC); 1982 FIFA World Cup qualification (AFC and OFC)	Demolished in 2020.
Beijing	Fengtai	Fengtai Sports Center Stadium	31,043	Football at the 1990 Asian Games – Men	
Beijing	Xicheng	Xiannongtan Stadium	30,000	Football at the 1990 Asian Games – Men; 1958 FIFA World Cup qualification	
Tianjin	Nankai	Tianjin Olympic Center Stadium	54,696	2026 FIFA World Cup qualification (AFC); 2010 FIFA World Cup qualification (AFC)	
Tianjin	Binhai	TEDA Football Stadium	36,390	2007 AFC Asian Cup qualification 2006 FIFA World Cup qualification (AFC)	Professional football stadium
Chongqing	Jiulongpo	Chongqing Olympic Sports Center Stadium	58,680	2008 East Asian Football Championship	
Sichuan	Chengdu	Chengdu Sports Center	39,225	1994 FIFA World Cup qualification (AFC)	
Liaoning	Shenyang	Shenyang Olympic Sports Center Stadium	60,000	2018 FIFA World Cup qualification (AFC)	
Liaoning	Shenyang	Wulihe Stadium	60,000	2002 FIFA World Cup qualification (AFC)	Demolished in 2007.
Liaoning	Shenyang	Shenyang People's Stadium	Unknown	1990 FIFA World Cup qualification (AFC)	Demolished in 2002.
Liaoning	Dalian	Jinzhou Stadium	30,776	1998 FIFA World Cup qualification (AFC)	
Zhejiang	Hangzhou	Yellow Dragon Sports Center Stadium	35,260	2011 AFC Asian Cup qualification	
Hubei	Wuhan	Wuhan Sports Center Stadium	54,357	2018 FIFA World Cup qualification (AFC); 2015 East Asian Cup	
Hunan	Changsha	Helong Sports Center Stadium	55,000	2018 FIFA World Cup qualification (AFC); 2015 AFC Asian Cup qualification 2007 AFC Asian Cup qualification	
Guangdong	Guangzhou	Tianhe Stadium	54,856	2022 FIFA World Cup qualification (AFC); 2007 AFC Asian Cup qualification 2006 FIFA World Cup qualification (AFC); 1990 FIFA World Cup qualification (AFC); Football at the 1988 Summer Olympics – Men's Asian Qualifiers	
Guangdong	Guangzhou	Guangzhou Higher Education Mega Center Central Stadium	39,346	2014 FIFA World Cup qualification (AFC)	
Guangdong	Guangzhou	Guangdong Provincial People's Stadium	15,000	2002 FIFA World Cup qualification (AFC); Football at the 1988 Summer Olympics – Men's Asian Qualifiers	
Guangdong	Shenzhen	Shenzhen Universiade Sports Centre Stadium	60,334	2026 FIFA World Cup qualification (AFC)	
Guangdong	Shenzhen	Bao'an Sports Center Stadium	40,000	2018 FIFA World Cup qualification (AFC)	
Guangdong	Shenzhen	Shenzhen Stadium	32,500	2014 FIFA World Cup qualification (AFC)	
Guangdong	Shenzhen	Shenzhen Bay Sports Center Stadium	20,000	2014 FIFA World Cup qualification (AFC)	
Guangdong	Foshan	Century Lotus Stadium	36,686	2010 FIFA World Cup qualification (AFC)	
Yunnan	Kunming	Kunming Tuodong Sports Center Stadium	42,000	2018 FIFA World Cup qualification (AFC); 2014 FIFA World Cup qualification (AFC); 2010 FIFA World Cup qualification (AFC); 2002 FIFA World Cup qualification (AFC)	
Shaanxi	Xi'an	Shaanxi Province Stadium	50,100	2018 FIFA World Cup qualification (AFC); 2015 AFC Asian Cup qualification 2002 FIFA World Cup qualification (AFC)	

== See also ==
- List of stadiums in China
- List of football stadiums in China
