= Switzerland national football team results (2000–2019) =

- Win Draw Loss

This article lists the results for the Switzerland national football team from 2000 to 2019.

Matches highlighted in purple are competitive fixtures.

== 2000s ==
=== 2000 ===
19 February 2000 Oman Cup	Oman	1–4	Switzerland	Muscat, Oman
UTC+4	Al-Mahruqy 77' (pen.)	Report	Cantaluppi 17', 67'; Rey 38'; H. Yakin 89'	Stadium: Sultan Qaboos Sports Complex; Attendance: 600; Referee: Abdullah Al Naqbi (United Arab Emirates)

23 February 2000 Oman Cup	Switzerland	0–1	United Arab Emirates	Muscat, Oman
UTC+4		Report	Ali 86'	Stadium: Sultan Qaboos Sports Complex; Attendance: 192; Referee: Mohamed Al Muflah (Oman)

29 March 2000 Friendly	Switzerland	2–2	Norway	Lugano, Switzerland
20:15 UTC+2	Chapuisat 56'; Cantaluppi 74'	Report	Solbakken 32'; Skammelsrud 73' (pen.)	Stadium: Cornaredo Stadium; Attendance: 5,800; Referee: Pasquale Rodomonti (Italy)

26 April 2000 Friendly	Germany	1–1	Switzerland	Kaiserslautern, Germany
20:30 UTC+2	Kirsten 85'	Report	H. Yakin 33'	Stadium: Fritz-Walter-Stadion; Attendance: 32,000; Referee: Morgan Norman (Sweden)

16 August 2000 Friendly	Switzerland	2–2	Greece	St. Gallen, Switzerland
20:15 UTC+2	Comisetti 14'; Yakin 79'	Report	Ouzounidis 20'; Georgiadis 23'	Stadium: Espenmoos Stadium; Attendance: 6,000; Referee: Tom Henning Øvrebø (Norway)

2 September 2000 2002 World Cup qualification	Switzerland	0–1	Russia	Zürich, Switzerland
20:15 UTC+2		Report	Beschastnykh 74'	Stadium: Hardturm; Attendance: 6,000; Referee: Kim Milton Nielsen (Denmark)

7 October 2000 2002 World Cup qualification	Switzerland	5–1	Faroe Islands	Zürich, Switzerland
17:30 UTC+2	Zwyssig 26'; Fournier 35'; Türkyilmaz 42' (pen.), 44' (pen.), 53' (pen.)	Report	Petersen 4'	Stadium: Hardturm; Attendance: 9,600; Referee: Costas Kapitanis (Cyprus)

11 October 2000 2002 World Cup qualification	Slovenia	2–2	Switzerland	Ljubljana, Slovenia
20:15 UTC+2	Šiljak 44'; Ačimovič 79'	Report	Türkyilmaz 20', 66'	Stadium: Bežigrad Stadium; Attendance: 6,650; Referee: Paul Durkin (England)

15 November 2000 Friendly	Tunisia	1–1	Switzerland	Tunis, Tunisia
19:00 UTC+1	Bouazizi 67'	Report	Cantaluppi 20'	Stadium: Stade El Menzah; Attendance: 4,000; Referee: Djamel Eddine Benchana (Algeria)

=== 2001 ===
28 February 2001 Friendly	Poland	4–0	Switzerland	Larnaca, Cyprus
18:00 UTC+2	Olisadebe 21'; Karwan 45'; Hajto 59' (pen.); Krzynówek 90'	Report		Stadium: Antonis Papadopoulos Stadium; Attendance: 200; Referee: Tasos Papaioannou (Cyprus)

24 March 2001 2002 World Cup qualification	FR Yugoslavia	1–1	Switzerland	Belgrade, FR Yugoslavia
20:15 UTC+1	Mihajlović 68'	Report	Chapuisat 84'	Stadium: Partizan Stadium; Attendance: 30,000; Referee: Karl-Erik Nilsson (Sweden)

28 March 2001 2002 World Cup qualification	Switzerland	5–0	Luxembourg	Zürich, Switzerland
20:15 UTC+2	Frei 9', 31', 90'; Lonfat 64'; Chapuisat 72'	Report		Stadium: Hardturm; Attendance: 8,600; Referee: Claus Bo Larsen (Denmark)

25 April 2001 Friendly	Switzerland	0–2	Sweden	Geneva, Switzerland
18:15UTC+2			Svensson 61', 79'	Stadium: Stade des Charmilles; Attendance: 6,062; Referee: Bruno Derrien (France)

2 June 2001 2002 World Cup qualification	Faroe Islands	0–1	Switzerland	Toftir, Faroe Islands
19:15 UTC+1		Report	Frei 81'	Stadium: Svangaskarð; Attendance: 3,500; Referee: Dougie McDonald (Scotland)

6 June 2001 2002 World Cup qualification	Switzerland	0–1	Slovenia	Basel, Switzerland
20:15 UTC+2		Report	Cimirotič 82'	Stadium: St. Jakob-Park; Attendance: 26,000; Referee: Jacek Granat (Poland)

15 August 2001 Friendly	Austria	1–2	Switzerland	Vienna, Austria
19:30 UTC+2	Herzog 51'	Report	Vogel 10'; H. Yakin 74'	Stadium: Ernst-Happel Stadion; Attendance: 21,200; Referee: Nicolai Vollquartz (Denmark)

1 September 2001 2002 World Cup qualification	Switzerland	1–2	FR Yugoslavia	Basel, Switzerland
20:15 UTC+2	Yakin 24'	Report	Milošević 39'; Krstajić 74'	Stadium: St. Jakob-Park; Attendance: 26,000; Referee: Claude Colombo (France)

5 September 2001 2002 World Cup qualification	Luxembourg	0–3	Switzerland	Luxembourg City, Luxembourg
20:15 UTC+2		Report	Frei 12'; Türkyilmaz 58', 84'	Stadium: Stade Josy Barthel; Attendance: 3,858; Referee: Sorin Corpodean (Romania)

6 October 2001 2002 World Cup qualification	Russia	4–0	Switzerland	Moscow, Russia
18:00 UTC+4	Beschastnykh 14' (pen.), 19', 38'; Titov 83'	Report1; Report2		Stadium: Central Dynamo Stadium; Attendance: 22,000; Referee: Knud Erik Fisker (Denmark)

=== 2002 ===
12 February 2002 Cyprus International Tournament	Cyprus	1–1 (a.e.t.) (4–2 p)	Switzerland	Nicosia, Cyprus
17:00 UTC+2	Konstantinou 21'	Report	Yakin 32'	Stadium: Makario Stadium; Attendance: 100; Referee: Nikos Agelakis (Greece)

13 February 2002 Cyprus International Tournament	Switzerland	2–1	Hungary	Limassol, Cyprus
17:00 UTC+2	Magnin 53'; H. Yakin 56'	Report	Gyepes 82'	Stadium: Tsirio Stadium; Attendance: 100; Referee: Socratis Socratous (Cyprus)

27 March 2002 Friendly	Sweden	1–1	Switzerland	Malmö, Sweden
19:00 UTC+2	Allbäck 29'	Report	Cabanas 54'	Stadium: Malmö Stadion; Attendance: 19,096; Referee: Valentin Ivanov (Russia)

15 May 2002 Friendly	Switzerland	1–3	Canada	St. Gallen, Switzerland
18:00 UTC+2	Nkufo 80'	Report	Radzinski 20', 47'; Stalteri 38'	Stadium: Espenmoos Stadium; Attendance: 4,000; Referee: Konrad Plautz (Austria)

21 August 2002 Friendly	Switzerland	3–2	Austria	Basel, Switzerland
20:30 UTC+2	H. Yakin 19'; Frei 41'; M. Yakin 76'	Report	Wallner 11', 81'	Stadium: St. Jakob-Park; Attendance: 23,500; Referee: Roberto Rosetti (Italy)

8 September 2002 Euro 2004 qualifying	Switzerland	4–1	Georgia	Basel, Switzerland
16:00 UTC+2	Frei 37'; H. Yakin 62'; Müller 74'; Chapuisat 81'	Report	S. Arveladze 62'	Stadium: St. Jakob-Park; Attendance: 20,500; Referee: Vladimir Krisnak (Slovakia)

12 October 2002 Euro 2004 qualifying	Albania	1–1	Switzerland	Tirana, Albania
20:00 UTC+2	Murati 78'	Report	Yakin 37'	Stadium: Qemal Stafa Stadium; Attendance: 15,000; Referee: Orhan Erdemir (Turkey)

16 October 2002 Euro 2004 qualifying	Republic of Ireland	1–2	Switzerland	Dublin, Ireland
19:30 UTC+1	Magnin 78' (o.g.)	Report	Yakin 45'; Celestini 87'	Stadium: Lansdowne Road; Attendance: 35,000; Referee: Rune Pedersen (Norway)

=== 2003 ===
12 February 2003 Friendly	Slovenia	1–5	Switzerland	Nova Gorica, Slovenia
20:30 UTC+1	Rakovič 72'	Report	Yakin 3'; Haas 29'; Frei 36', 78'; Cabanas 49'	Stadium: Nova Gorica Sports Park; Attendance: 3,000; Referee: Attila Ábrahám (Hungary)

2 April 2003 Euro 2004 qualifying	Georgia	0–0	Switzerland	Tbilisi, Georgia
21:00 UTC+5		Report		Stadium: Lokomotiv Stadium; Attendance: 10,000; Referee: Edo Trivković (Croatia)

30 April 2003 Friendly	Switzerland	1–2	Italy	Geneva, Switzerland
21:00 UTC+2	Frei 6'	Report	Legrottaglie 10'; Zanetti 76'	Stadium: Stade de Genève; Attendance: 30,000; Referee: Damien Ledentu (France)

7 June 2003 Euro 2004 qualifying	Switzerland	2–2	Russia	Basel, Switzerland
20:15 UTC+2	Frei 13', 15'	Report	Ignashevich 23', 67' (pen.)	Stadium: St. Jakob Park; Attendance: 30,500; Referee: Arturo Daudén Ibáñez (Spain)

11 June 2003 Euro 2004 qualifying	Switzerland	3–2	Albania	Geneva, Switzerland
20:15 UTC+2	Haas 10'; Frei 32'; Cabanas 71'	Report	Lala 23'; Skela 86' (pen.)	Stadium: Stade de Genève; Attendance: 26,000; Referee: Steve Bennett (England)

20 August 2003 Friendly	Switzerland	0–2	France	Geneva, Switzerland
20:45 UTC+2		Report	Wiltord 13'; Marlet 55'	Stadium: Stade de Genève; Attendance: 30,000; Referee: Paul Allaerts (Belgium)

10 September 2003 Euro 2004 qualifying	Russia	4–1	Switzerland	Moscow, Russia
20:00 UTC+4	Bulykin 19', 32', 58'; Mostovoi 72'	Report	Karyaka 11' (o.g.)	Stadium: Lokomotiv Stadium; Attendance: 28,800; Referee: Pierluigi Collina (Italy)

11 October 2003 Euro 2004 qualifying	Switzerland	2–0	Republic of Ireland	Basel, Switzerland
17:30 UTC+2	Yakin 6'; Frei 60'	Report		Stadium: St. Jakob Park; Attendance: 31,006; Referee: Anders Frisk (Sweden)

=== 2004 ===
18 February 2004 Friendly	Morocco	2–1	Switzerland	Rabat, Morocco
19:30 UTC+0	Ajeddou 78'; Iajour 82'	Report	Frei 90'	Stadium: Stade Moulay Abdellah; Attendance: 1,700; Referee: Kamel Berber (Algeria)

31 March 2004 Friendly	Greece	1–0	Switzerland	Heraklion, Greece
21:15 UTC+3	Tsiartas 56'	Report		Stadium: Pankritio Stadium; Attendance: 21,000; Referee: René Temmink (Netherlands)

28 April 2004 Friendly	Switzerland	2–1	Slovenia	Geneva, Switzerland
20:15 UTC+2	Celestini 66'; Yakin 85'	Report	Zahovič 45'	Stadium: Stade de Genève; Attendance: 7,500; Referee: Ruud Bossen (Netherlands)

2 June 2004 Friendly	Switzerland	0–2	Germany	Basel, Switzerland
20:45 UTC+2		Report	Kurányi 62', 84'	Stadium: St. Jakob-Park; Attendance: 30,000; Referee: Domenico Messina (Italy)

6 June 2004 Friendly	Switzerland	1–0	Liechtenstein	Zürich, Switzerland
16:15 UTC+2	Gygax 90+1'	Report		Stadium: Hardturm; Attendance: 10,200; Referee: Dietmar Drabek (Austria)

13 June 2004 Euro 2004 Group B	Switzerland	0–0	Croatia	Leiria, Portugal
17:00 UTC+1		Report		Stadium: Estádio Dr. Magalhães Pessoa; Attendance: 24,090; Referee: Lucílio Batista (Portugal)

17 June 2004 Euro 2004 Group B	England	3–0	Switzerland	Coimbra, Portugal
17:00 UTC+1	Rooney 23', 75'; Gerrard 82'	UEFA Report		Stadium: Estádio Cidade de Coimbra; Attendance: 28,214; Referee: Valentin Ivanov (Russia)

21 June 2004 Euro 2004 Group B	France	3–1	Switzerland	Coimbra, Portugal
19:45 UTC+1	Zidane 20'; Henry 76', 84'	Report	Vonlanthen 26'	Stadium: Estádio Cidade de Coimbra; Attendance: 30,000; Referee: Ľuboš Micheľ (Slovakia)

18 August 2004 Friendly	Switzerland	0–0	Northern Ireland	Zürich, Switzerland
20:15 UTC+2		Report		Stadium: Hardturm; Attendance: 4,000; Referee: Nicolai Vollquartz (Denmark)

4 September 2004 2006 World Cup qualification	Switzerland	6–0	Faroe Islands	Basel, Switzerland
17:30 UTC+2	Vonlanthen 10', 14', 57'; Rey 29', 44', 55'	Report		Stadium: St. Jakob-Park; Attendance: 11,880; Referee: Alexandru Tudor (Romania)

8 September 2004 2006 World Cup qualification	Switzerland	1–1	Republic of Ireland	Basel, Switzerland
20:30 UTC+2	Yakin 17'	Report	Morrison 9'	Stadium: St. Jakob Park; Attendance: 28,000; Referee: Kyros Vassaras (Greece)

9 October 2004 2006 World Cup qualification	Israel	2–2	Switzerland	Ramat Gan, Israel
20:05 UTC+2	Benayoun 9', 48'	Report	Frei 26'; Vonlanthen 34'	Stadium: Ramat Gan Stadium; Attendance: 37,976; Referee: Mark Shield (Australia)

=== 2005 ===
9 February 2005 Friendly	United Arab Emirates	1–2	Switzerland	Dubai, United Arab Emirates
19:00 UTC+4	Matar 21'	Report	Gygax 9'; Müller 79'	Stadium: Maktoum bin Rashid Al Maktoum Stadium; Attendance: 1,200; Referee: Abdullah Al Hilali (Oman)

26 March 2005 2006 World Cup qualification	France	0–0	Switzerland	Saint-Denis, France
21:00 UTC+1		Report		Stadium: Stade de France; Attendance: 79,373; Referee: Massimo De Santis (Italy)

30 March 2005 2006 World Cup qualification	Switzerland	1–0	Cyprus	Zürich, Switzerland
20:30 UTC+2	Frei 88'	Report		Stadium: Hardturm; Attendance: 16,066; Referee: Stuart Dougal (Scotland)

4 June 2005 2006 World Cup qualification	Faroe Islands	1–3	Switzerland	Toftir, Faroe Islands
16:30 UTC+2	R. Jacobsen 70'	Report	Wicky 25'; Frei 72', 84'	Stadium: Svangaskarð; Attendance: 2,047; Referee: Serge Gumienny (Belgium)

17 August 2005 Friendly	Norway	0–2	Switzerland	Oslo, Norway
19:00 UTC+2		Report	Frei 50'; Bergdølmo 59' (o.g.)	Stadium: Ullevaal Stadion; Attendance: 19,623; Referee: Nicolai Vollquartz (Denmark)

3 September 2005 2006 World Cup qualification	Switzerland	1–1	Israel	Basel, Switzerland
17:30 UTC+2	Frei 6'	Report	Keisi 20'	Stadium: St. Jakob-Park; Attendance: 30,000; Referee: Roberto Rosetti (Italy)

7 September 2005 2006 World Cup qualification	Cyprus	1–3	Switzerland	Nicosia, Cyprus
21:15 UTC+3	Aloneftis 35'	Report	Frei 15'; Senderos 69'; Gygax 84'	Stadium: GSP Stadium; Attendance: 2,561; Referee: Nikolay Ivanov (Russia)

8 October 2005 2006 World Cup qualification	Switzerland	1–1	France	Bern, Switzerland
20:45 UTC+2	Magnin 79'	Report	Cissé 52'	Stadium: Stade de Suisse; Attendance: 31,400; Referee: Terje Hauge (Norway)

12 October 2005 2006 World Cup qualification	Republic of Ireland	0–0	Switzerland	Dublin, Ireland
19:45 UTC+1		Report		Stadium: Lansdowne Road; Attendance: 35,000; Referee: Markus Merk (Germany)

12 November 2005 2006 World Cup qualification playoffs	Switzerland	2–0	Turkey	Bern, Switzerland
20:45 UTC+1	Senderos 41'; Behrami 86'	Report		Stadium: Stade de Suisse; Attendance: 31,130; Referee: Ľuboš Micheľ (Slovakia)

16 November 2005 2006 World Cup qualification playoffs	Turkey	4–2 (4–4 agg.)	Switzerland	Istanbul, Turkey
20:15 UTC+2	Şanlı 22', 36', 89'; Ateş 52' (pen.)	Report	Frei 2' (pen.); Streller 84'	Stadium: Şükrü Saracoğlu Stadium; Attendance: 42,000; Referee: Frank De Bleeckere (Belgium)
Note: 4–4 on aggregate. Switzerland won on away goals

=== 2006 ===
1 March 2006 Friendly	Scotland	1–3	Switzerland	Glasgow, Scotland
20:00 UTC+0	Miller 54'	Report	Barnetta 21'; Gygax 41'; Cabanas 69'	Stadium: Hampden Park; Attendance: 20,952; Referee: Bruno Coué (France)

27 May 2006 Friendly	Switzerland	1–1	Ivory Coast	Basel, Switzerland
17:30 UTC+2	Barnetta 32'	Report	Faé 47'	Stadium: St. Jakob Park; Attendance: 22,000; Referee: Mikko Vuorela (Finland)

31 May 2006 Friendly	Switzerland	1–1	Italy	Geneva, Switzerland
20:50 UTC+2	Gygax 32'	Report	Gilardino 11'	Stadium: Stade de Genève; Attendance: 30,000; Referee: Peter Sippel (Germany)

3 June 2006 Friendly	Switzerland	4–1	China	Zürich, Switzerland
17:30 UTC+2	Frei 40', 49' (pen.); Streller 47', 73'	Report	Dong Fangzhuo 90+1'	Stadium: Hardturm; Attendance: 16,000; Referee: Ian Stokes (Ireland)

13 June 2006 2006 World Cup Group G	France	0–0	Switzerland	Stuttgart, Germany
18:00 UTC+2		Report		Stadium: Gottlieb-Daimler-Stadion; Attendance: 52,000; Referee: Valentin Ivanov (Russia)

19 June 2006 2006 World Cup Group G	Togo	0–2	Switzerland	Dortmund, Germany
15:00 UTC+2		Report	Frei 16'; Barnetta 88'	Stadium: Westfalenstadion; Attendance: 65,000; Referee: Carlos Amarilla (Paraguay)

23 June 2006 2006 World Cup Group G	Switzerland	2–0	South Korea	Hanover, Germany
21:00 UTC+2	Senderos 23'; Frei 77'	Report		Stadium: AWD-Arena; Attendance: 43,000; Referee: Horacio Elizondo (Argentina)

26 June 2006 2006 World Cup R16	Switzerland	0–0 (a.e.t.) (0–3 p)	Ukraine	Cologne, Germany
21:00 UTC+2		Report		Stadium: RheinEnergieStadion; Attendance: 45,000; Referee: Benito Archundia (Mexico)
	Penalties
	Streller (penalty missed); Barnetta (penalty missed); Cabanas (penalty missed)		(penalty missed) Shevchenko; (penalty scored) Milevskyi; (penalty scored) Rebrov; (penalty scored) Husiev

16 August 2006 Friendly	Liechtenstein	0–3	Switzerland	Vaduz, Liechtenstein
20:15 UTC+2		Report	Frei 11', 51' (pen.); Margairaz 65'	Stadium: Rheinpark Stadion; Attendance: 4,837; Referee: Bernhard Brugger (Austria)

2 September 2006 Friendly	Switzerland	1–0	Venezuela	Basel, Switzerland
17:15 UTC+2	Frei 86'	Report		Stadium: St. Jakob Park; Attendance: 12,500; Referee: Alain Hamer (Luxembourg)

6 September 2006 Friendly	Switzerland	2–0	Costa Rica	Geneva, Switzerland
20:15 UTC+2	Streller 12'; Frei 39'	Report		Stadium: Stade de Genève; Attendance: 12,000; Referee: Dick van Egmond (Netherlands)

11 October 2006 Friendly	Austria	2–1	Switzerland	Innsbruck, Austria
19:30 UTC+2	Linz 24' (pen.); Kuljić 36'		Streller 70' (o.g.)	Stadium: Tivoli Neu Stadion; Attendance: 11,000; Referee: Michael Svendsen (Denmark)

15 November 2006 Friendly	Switzerland	1–2	Brazil	Basel, Switzerland
20:30 UTC+1	Maicon 70' (o.g.)	Report	Luisão 22'; Kaká 35'	Stadium: St. Jakob Park; Attendance: 22,000; Referee: Markus Merk (Germany)

=== 2007 ===
7 February 2007 Friendly	Germany	3–1	Switzerland	Düsseldorf, Germany
20:00 UTC+1	Kurányi 7'; Gómez 30'; Frings 66'	Report	Streller 71'	Stadium: LTU-Arena; Attendance: 51,333; Referee: Ruud Bossen (Netherlands)

22 March 2007 Friendly	Jamaica	0–2	Switzerland	Fort Lauderdale, United States
19:15 UTC-4		Report	Streller 7'; Inler 12'	Stadium: Lockhart Stadium; Attendance: 3,254; Referee: Alex Prus (United States)

25 March 2007 Friendly	Switzerland	1–3	Colombia	Miami, United States
13:15 UTC-4	A. Frei 39' (pen.)	Report	Perea 5'; Viafara 57'; Chitiva 85'	Stadium: Orange Bowl; Attendance: 16,000; Referee: Terry Vaughn (United States)

2 June 2007 Friendly	Switzerland	1–1	Argentina	Basel, Switzerland
20:30 UTC+2	Streller 64'	Report	Tevez 49'	Stadium: St. Jakob Park; Attendance: 24,000; Referee: Domenico Messina (Italy)

22 August 2007 Friendly	Switzerland	2–1	Netherlands	Geneva, Switzerland
20:30 UTC+2	Barnetta 9' (pen.), 51'	Report	Kuyt 52'	Stadium: Stade de Genève; Attendance: 24,000; Referee: Laurent Duhamel (France)

7 September 2007 Turnier der Kontinente	Switzerland	2–1	Chile	Vienna, Austria
18:00 UTC+2	Barnetta 13'; Streller 55'	Report	Sanchez 44'	Stadium: Ernst Happel Stadion; Attendance: 2,500; Referee: Fritz Stuchlik (Austria)

11 September 2007 Turnier der Kontinente	Switzerland	3–4	Japan	Klagenfurt, Austria
20:15 UTC+2	Magnin 11'; Nkufo 13' (pen.); Djourou 81'	Report	Nakamura 53' (pen.), 78' (pen.); Maki 68'; Yano 90+2'	Stadium: Hypo Group Arena; Attendance: 19,500; Referee: Stefan Meßner (Austria)

13 October 2007 Friendly	Switzerland	3–1	Austria	Zürich, Switzerland
19:30 UTC+2	Streller 2', 55'; H. Yakin 36'		Aufhauser 11'	Stadium: Letzigrund; Attendance: 22,500; Referee: Alain Hamer (Luxembourg)

17 October 2007 Friendly	Switzerland	0–1	United States	Basel, Switzerland
20:30 UTC+2		Report	Bradley 86'	Stadium: St. Jakob-Park; Attendance: 16,500; Referee: Frank De Bleeckere (Belgium)

20 November 2007 Friendly	Switzerland	0–1	Nigeria	Zürich, Switzerland
20:45 UTC+1		Report	Taiwo 79'	Stadium: Letzigrund; Attendance: 12,700; Referee: Ivan Bebek (Croatia)

=== 2008 ===
6 February 2008 Friendly	England	2–1	Switzerland	London, England
20:00 UTC+0	Jenas 40'; Wright-Phillips 62'	Report	Derdiyok 58'	Stadium: Wembley Stadium; Attendance: 86,857; Referee: Felix Brych (Germany)

26 March 2008 Friendly	Switzerland	0–4	Germany	Basel, Switzerland
20:45 UTC+2		Report	Klose 23'; Gómez 61', 67'; Podolski 89'	Stadium: St. Jakob-Park; Attendance: 38,500; Referee: Eric Braamhaar (Netherlands)

24 May 2008 Friendly	Switzerland	2–0	Slovakia	Lugano, Switzerland
18:00 UTC+2	Behrami 56'; Frei 63'	Report		Stadium: Cornaredo Stadium; Attendance: 10,150; Referee: Alan Kelly (Ireland)

30 May 2008 Friendly	Switzerland	3–0	Liechtenstein	St. Gallen, Switzerland
20:30 UTC+2	Frei 24', 31'; Vonlanthen 68'	Report		Stadium: AFG Arena; Attendance: 18,000; Referee: Olivier Thual (France)

7 June 2008 Euro 2008 Group A	Switzerland	0–1	Czech Republic	Basel, Switzerland
18:00 UTC+2		Report	Svěrkoš 71'	Stadium: St. Jakob-Park; Attendance: 39,730; Referee: Roberto Rosetti (Italy)

11 June 2008 Euro 2008 Group A	Switzerland	1–2	Turkey	Basel, Switzerland
20:45 UTC+2	Yakin 32'	Report	Şentürk 57'; Turan 90+2'	Stadium: St. Jakob-Park; Attendance: 39,730; Referee: Ľuboš Micheľ (Slovakia)

15 June 2008 Euro 2008 Group A	Switzerland	2–0	Portugal	Basel, Switzerland
20:45 UTC+2	Yakin 71', 83' (pen.)	Report		Stadium: St. Jakob-Park; Attendance: 39,730; Referee: Konrad Plautz (Austria)

20 August 2008 Friendly	Switzerland	4–1	Cyprus	Geneva, Switzerland
20:45 UTC+2	Stocker 8'; Yakin 26'; Nef 72'; Vonlanthen 81'	Report	Makridis 34'	Stadium: Stade de Genève; Attendance: 14,500; Referee: Darko Čeferin (Slovenia)

6 September 2008 2010 World Cup qualification	Israel	2–2	Switzerland	Ramat Gan, Israel
20:55 UTC+3	Benayoun 73'; Sahar 90+2'	Report	Yakin 45'; Nkufo 56'	Stadium: Ramat Gan Stadium; Attendance: 29,600; Referee: Martin Hansson (Sweden)

10 September 2008 2010 World Cup qualification	Switzerland	1–2	Luxembourg	Zürich, Switzerland
20:30 UTC+2	Nkufo 43'	Report	Strasser 27'; Leweck 87'	Stadium: Letzigrund; Attendance: 20,500; Referee: Dejan Filipovic (Serbia)

11 October 2008 2010 World Cup qualification	Switzerland	2–1	Latvia	St. Gallen, Switzerland
17:45 UTC+2	Frei 63'; Nkufo 73'	Report	Ivanovs 71'	Stadium: AFG Arena; Attendance: 18,026; Referee: Lucílio Batista (Portugal)

15 October 2008 2010 World Cup qualification	Greece	1–2	Switzerland	Piraeus, Greece
21:30 UTC+3	Charisteas 68'	Report	Frei 42' (pen.); Nkufo 77'	Stadium: Karaiskakis Stadium; Attendance: 28,810; Referee: Luis Medina Cantalejo (Spain)

19 November 2008 Friendly	Switzerland	1–0	Finland	St. Gallen, Switzerland
20:30 UTC+1	Ziegler 84'	Report		Stadium: AFG Arena; Attendance: 11,500; Referee: Aleksei Kulbakov (Belarus)

=== 2009 ===
11 February 2009 Friendly	Switzerland	1–1	Bulgaria	Geneva, Switzerland
20:15 UTC+1	Huggel 45'	Report	I. Popov 33'	Stadium: Stade de Genève; Attendance: 9,670; Referee: Duarte Gomes (Portugal)

28 March 2009 2010 World Cup qualification	Moldova	0–2	Switzerland	Chişinău, Moldova
18:45 UTC+2		Report; Report (FIFA)	Frei 32'; Fernandes 90'	Stadium: Stadionul Zimbru; Attendance: 10,500; Referee: Dougie McDonald (Scotland)

1 April 2009 2010 World Cup qualification	Switzerland	2–0	Moldova	Geneva, Switzerland
20:30 UTC+2	Nkufo 20'; Frei 52'	Report; Report (FIFA)		Stadium: Stade de Genève; Attendance: 20,100; Referee: Gianluca Rocchi (Italy)

21 August 2009 Friendly	Switzerland	0–0	Italy	Basel, Switzerland
20:45 UTC+2				Stadium: St. Jakob-Park; Attendance: 31,500; Referee: Knut Kircher (Germany)

5 September 2009 2010 World Cup qualification	Switzerland	2–0	Greece	Basel, Switzerland
20:30 UTC+2	Grichting 84'; Padalino 87'	Report		Stadium: St. Jakob-Park; Attendance: 38,500; Referee: Frank De Bleeckere (Belgium)

9 September 2009 2010 World Cup qualification	Latvia	2–2	Switzerland	Riga, Latvia
21:30 UTC+3	Cauņa 62'; Astafjevs 75'	Report	Frei 43'; Derdiyok 80'	Stadium: Skonto Stadium; Attendance: 8,600; Referee: Pavel Královec (Czech Republic)

10 October 2009 2010 World Cup qualification	Luxembourg	0–3	Switzerland	Luxembourg City, Luxembourg
17:45 UTC+2		Report	Senderos 6', 8'; Huggel 22'	Stadium: Stade Josy Barthel; Attendance: 8,031; Referee: Eduardo Iturralde González (Spain)

14 October 2009 2010 World Cup qualification	Switzerland	0–0	Israel	Basel, Switzerland
20:00 UTC+2		Report		Stadium: St. Jakob-Park; Attendance: 38,500; Referee: Alexandru Tudor (Romania)

14 November 2009 Friendly	Switzerland	0–1	Norway	Geneva, Switzerland
17:45 UTC+2		Report	Carew 48' (pen.)	Stadium: Stade de Genève; Attendance: 16,000; Referee: Mark Whitby (Wales)

== 2010s ==
=== 2010 ===
3 March 2010 Friendly	Switzerland	1–3	Uruguay	St. Gallen, Switzerland
20:15 UTC+1	Inler 29' (pen.)	Report	Forlán 35'; Suárez 49'; Cavani 87'	Stadium: AFG Arena; Attendance: 12,500; Referee: Nicola Rizzoli (Italy)

1 June 2010 Friendly	Switzerland	0–1	Costa Rica	Sion, Switzerland
20:15 UTC+1		Report	Parks 57'	Stadium: Stade Tourbillon; Attendance: 11,300; Referee: Anthony Buttimer (Ireland)

5 June 2010 Friendly	Switzerland	1–1	Italy	Geneva, Switzerland
20:45 UTC+2	Inler 10'	Report	Quagliarella 14'	Stadium: Stade de Genève; Attendance: 30,000; Referee: Hervé Piccirillo (France)

16 June 2010 2010 World Cup Group H	Spain	0–1	Switzerland	Durban, South Africa
16:00 UTC+2		Report	Fernandes 52'	Stadium: Moses Mabhida Stadium; Attendance: 62,453; Referee: Howard Webb (England)

21 June 2010 2010 World Cup Group H	Chile	1–0	Switzerland	Port Elizabeth, South Africa
16:00 UTC+2	González 75'	Report		Stadium: Nelson Mandela Bay Stadium; Attendance: 34,872; Referee: Khalil Al Ghamdi (Saudi Arabia)

25 June 2010 2010 World Cup Group H	Switzerland	0–0	Honduras	Bloemfontein, South Africa
20:30 UTC+2		Report		Stadium: Free State Stadium; Attendance: 28,042; Referee: Héctor Baldassi (Argentina)

11 August 2010 Friendly	Austria	0–1	Switzerland	Klagenfurt, Austria
20:30 UTC+2		Report	Costanzo 73'	Stadium: Wörthersee Stadion; Attendance: 18,000; Referee: Antonio Rubinos Pérez (Spain)

3 September 2010 Friendly	Switzerland	0–0	Australia	St. Gallen, Switzerland
20:15 UTC+2		Report		Stadium: AFG Arena; Attendance: 14,660; Referee: Thomas Einwaller (Austria)

7 September 2010 Euro 2012 qualifying	Switzerland	1–3	England	Basel, Switzerland
20:45 UTC+2	Shaqiri 71'	Report	Rooney 10'; A. Johnson 69'; Bent 88'	Stadium: St. Jakob Park; Attendance: 37,500; Referee: Nicola Rizzoli (Italy)

8 October 2010 Euro 2012 qualifying	Montenegro	1–0	Switzerland	Podgorica, Montenegro
20:30 UTC+2	Vučinić 67'	Report		Stadium: Podgorica City Stadium; Attendance: 10,750; Referee: Eduardo Iturralde González (Spain)

12 October 2010 Euro 2012 qualifying	Switzerland	4–1	Wales	Basel, Switzerland
20:30 UTC+2	Stocker 8', 89'; Streller 21'; Inler 82' (pen.)	Report	Bale 13'	Stadium: St. Jakob Park; Attendance: 26,000; Referee: Alain Hamer (Luxembourg)

17 November 2010 Friendly	Switzerland	2–2	Ukraine	Geneva, Switzerland
20:15 UTC+1	Frei 40', 62'	Report	Yarmolenko 48'; Konoplyanka 75'	Stadium: Stade de Genève; Attendance: 11,100; Referee: Serge Gumienny (Belgium)

=== 2011 ===
9 February 2011 Friendly	Malta	0–0	Switzerland	Ta' Qali, Malta
20:30 UTC+1		Report		Stadium: Ta' Qali National Stadium; Attendance: 3,000; Referee: Marios Stamatis (Cyprus)

26 March 2011 Euro 2012 qualifying	Bulgaria	0–0	Switzerland	Sofia, Bulgaria
18:45 UTC+2		Report		Stadium: Vasil Levski National Stadium; Attendance: 9,600; Referee: William Collum (Scotland)

4 June 2011 Euro 2012 qualifying	England	2–2	Switzerland	London, England
16:45 UTC+1	Lampard 37' (pen.); Young 51'	Report	Barnetta 32', 35'	Stadium: Wembley Stadium; Attendance: 84,459; Referee: Damir Skomina (Slovenia)

10 August 2011 Friendly	Liechtenstein	1–2	Switzerland	Vaduz, Liechtenstein
20:15 UTC+2	Ritzberger 51'	Report	Derdiyok 15'; Stocklasa 34' (o.g.)	Stadium: Rheinpark Stadion; Attendance: 5,444; Referee: René Eisner (Austria)

6 September 2011 Euro 2012 qualifying	Switzerland	3–1	Bulgaria	Basel, Switzerland
20:30 UTC+2	Shaqiri 45+2', 62', 90'	Report	I. Ivanov 8'	Stadium: St. Jakob Park; Attendance: 16,880; Referee: Pavel Kralovec (Czech Republic)

7 October 2011 Euro 2012 qualifying	Wales	2–0	Switzerland	Swansea, Wales
19:45 UTC+1	Ramsey 60' (pen.); Bale 71'	Report		Stadium: Liberty Stadium; Attendance: 12,317; Referee: Björn Kuipers (Netherlands)

11 October 2011 Euro 2012 qualifying	Switzerland	2–0	Montenegro	Basel, Switzerland
20:15 UTC+2	Derdiyok 51'; Lichtsteiner 65'	Report		Stadium: St. Jakob Park; Attendance: 19,997; Referee: Olegário Benquerença (Portugal)

11 November 2011 Friendly	Netherlands	0–0	Switzerland	Amsterdam, Netherlands
20:30 UTC+1		Report		Stadium: Amsterdam ArenA; Attendance: 47,500; Referee: Jonas Eriksson (Sweden)

15 November 2011 Friendly	Luxembourg	0–1	Switzerland	Luxembourg City, Luxembourg
20:15 UTC+1		Report	Xhaka 9'	Stadium: Stade Josy Barthel; Attendance: 852; Referee: Sébastien Delferière (Belgium)

=== 2012 ===
29 February 2012 Friendly	Switzerland	1–3	Argentina	Bern, Switzerland
20:30 UTC+1	Shaqiri 50'	Report	Messi 20', 88', 90+3' (pen.)	Stadium: Stade de Suisse; Attendance: 30,250; Referee: Florian Meyer (Germany)

26 May 2012 Friendly	Switzerland	5–3	Germany	Basel, Switzerland
18:00 UTC+2	Derdiyok 21', 23', 50'; Lichtsteiner 67'; Mehmedi 76'	Report	Hummels 45'; Schürrle 64'; Reus 72'	Stadium: St. Jakob-Park; Attendance: 27,381; Referee: Antony Gautier (France)

30 May 2012 Friendly	Switzerland	0–1	Romania	Lucerne, Switzerland
20:15 UTC+2		Report	Grozav 56'	Stadium: Swissporarena; Attendance: 11,850; Referee: Svein Moen (Norway)

15 August 2012 Friendly	Croatia	2–4	Switzerland	Split, Croatia
20:30 UTC+2	Eduardo 20', 64'	Report	Xhaka 11'; Barnetta 37'; Gavranović 51', 81'	Stadium: Stadion Poljud; Attendance: 10,000; Referee: Antonio Damato (Italy)

7 September 2012 2014 World Cup qualification	Slovenia	0–2	Switzerland	Ljubljana, Slovenia
20:30 UTC+2		Report	Xhaka 20'; Inler 51'	Stadium: Stožice Stadium; Attendance: 13,213; Referee: Paolo Tagliavento (Italy)

11 September 2012 2014 World Cup qualification	Switzerland	2–0	Albania	Lucerne, Switzerland
20:30 UTC+2	Shaqiri 23'; Inler 68' (pen.)	Report		Stadium: Swissporarena; Attendance: 16,500; Referee: Ovidiu Hațegan (Romania)

12 October 2012 2014 World Cup qualification	Switzerland	1–1	Norway	Bern, Switzerland
20:30 UTC+2	Gavranović 79'	Report	Hangeland 81'	Stadium: Stade de Suisse; Attendance: 31,516; Referee: David Fernández Borbalán (Spain)

16 October 2012 2014 FIFA World Cup qualification	Iceland	0–2	Switzerland	Reykjavík, Iceland
18:30 UTC±0		Report	Barnetta 66'; Gavranović 79'	Stadium: Laugardalsvöllur; Attendance: 8,369; Referee: Alan Kelly (Republic of Ireland)

14 November 2012 Friendly	Tunisia	1–2	Switzerland	Sousse, Tunisia
18:15 UTC+1	Dhaouadi 59'	Report	Derdiyok 39'; Shaqiri 90+5'	Stadium: Stade Olympique de Sousse; Attendance: 3,000; Referee: Helmut Fleischer (Germany)

=== 2013 ===
6 February 2013 Friendly	Greece	0–0	Switzerland	Piraeus, Greece
21:30 UTC+2		Report		Stadium: Karaiskakis Stadium; Attendance: 7,500; Referee: Alberto Undiano Mallenco (Spain)

23 March 2013 2014 World Cup qualification	Cyprus	0–0	Switzerland	Nicosia, Cyprus
18:30 UTC+2		Report		Stadium: GSP Stadium; Attendance: 3,572; Referee: Manuel Gräfe (Germany)

8 June 2013 2014 World Cup qualification	Switzerland	1–0	Cyprus	Geneva, Switzerland
17:30 UTC+2	Seferovic 90'	Report		Stadium: Stade de Genève; Attendance: 16,900; Referee: Paolo Mazzoleni (Italy)

14 August 2013 Friendly	Switzerland	1–0	Brazil	Basel, Switzerland
20:45 UTC+2	Dani Alves 48' (o.g.)	Report		Stadium: St. Jakob Park; Attendance: 31,100; Referee: Deniz Aytekin (Germany)

6 September 2013 2014 World Cup qualification	Switzerland	4–4	Iceland	Bern, Switzerland
20:30 UTC+2	Lichtsteiner 15', 30'; Schär 27'; Džemaili 54' (pen.)	Report	Guðmundsson 3', 68', 90+1'; Sigþórsson 56'	Stadium: Stade de Suisse; Attendance: 26,000; Referee: Sergei Karasev (Russia)

10 September 2013 2014 World Cup qualification	Norway	0–2	Switzerland	Oslo, Norway
19:00 UTC+2		Report	Schär 12', 51'	Stadium: Ullevaal Stadion; Attendance: 16,631; Referee: Howard Webb (England)

11 October 2013 2014 World Cup qualification	Albania	1–2	Switzerland	Tirana, Albania
20:30 UTC+2	Salihi 89' (pen.)	Report	Shaqiri 48'; Lang 79'	Stadium: Qemal Stafa Stadium; Attendance: 14,000; Referee: Pedro Proença (Portugal)

15 October 2013 2014 World Cup qualification	Switzerland	1–0	Slovenia	Bern, Switzerland
20:00 UTC+2	Xhaka 73'	Report		Stadium: Stade de Suisse; Attendance: 22,014; Referee: Björn Kuipers (Netherlands)

15 November 2013 Friendly	South Korea	2–1	Switzerland	Seoul, South Korea
20:00 UTC+9	Hong Jeong-ho 59'; Lee Chung-yong 87'	Report	Kasami 7'	Stadium: Seoul World Cup Stadium; Attendance: 36,813; Referee: Diego Abal (Argentina)

=== 2014 ===
5 March 2014 Friendly	Switzerland	2–2	Croatia	St. Gallen, Switzerland
20:30 UTC+1	Drmić 34', 41'	Report	Olić 39', 54'	Stadium: AFG Arena; Attendance: 17,200; Referee: Hugo Miguel (Portugal)

30 May 2014 Friendly	Switzerland	1–0	Jamaica	Lucerne, Switzerland
20:30 UTC+2	Drmić 84'	Report		Stadium: Swissporarena; Attendance: 17,500; Referee: Neil Doyle (Ireland)

3 June 2014 Friendly	Switzerland	2–0	Peru	Lucerne, Switzerland
20:30 UTC+2	Lichtsteiner 78'; Shaqiri 84'	Report		Stadium: Swissporarena; Attendance: 15,000; Referee: Daniel Stefański (Poland)

15 June 2014 2014 World Cup Group E	Switzerland	2–1	Ecuador	Brasília, Brazil
13:00 UTC−3	Mehmedi 48'; Seferovic 90+3'	Report	E. Valencia 22'	Stadium: Estádio Nacional Mané Garrincha; Attendance: 68,351; Referee: Ravshan Irmatov (Uzbekistan)

20 June 2014 2014 World Cup Group E	France	5–2	Switzerland	Salvador, Brazil
16:00 UTC−3	Giroud 17'; Matuidi 18'; Valbuena 40'; Benzema 67'; Sissoko 73'	Report	Džemaili 81'; Xhaka 87'	Stadium: Itaipava Arena Fonte Nova; Attendance: 51,003; Referee: Björn Kuipers (Netherlands)

25 June 2014 2014 World Cup Group E	Honduras	0–3	Switzerland	Manaus, Brazil
16:00 UTC−4		Report	Shaqiri 6', 31', 71'	Stadium: Arena da Amazônia; Attendance: 40,322; Referee: Néstor Pitana (Argentina)

1 July 2014 2014 World Cup R16	Argentina	1–0 (a.e.t.)	Switzerland	São Paulo, Brazil
13:00 UTC−3	Di María 118'	Report		Stadium: Arena Corinthians; Attendance: 63,255; Referee: Jonas Eriksson (Sweden)

8 September 2014 Euro 2016 qualifying	Switzerland	0–2	England	Basel, Switzerland
20:45 UTC+2		Report	Welbeck 58', 90+4'	Stadium: St. Jakob-Park; Attendance: 35,500; Referee: Cüneyt Çakır (Turkey)

9 October 2014 Euro 2016 qualifying	Slovenia	1–0	Switzerland	Maribor, Slovenia
20:45 UTC+2	Novaković 79' (pen.)	Report		Stadium: Ljudski vrt Attendance: 8,500; Referee: Wolfgang Stark (Germany)

14 October 2014 Euro 2016 qualifying	San Marino	0–4	Switzerland	Serravalle, San Marino
20:45 UTC+2		Report	Seferovic 10', 23'; Džemaili 30'; Shaqiri 79'	Stadium: San Marino Stadium; Attendance: 2,289; Referee: Tony Chapron (France)

15 November 2014 Euro 2016 qualifying	Switzerland	4–0	Lithuania	St. Gallen, Switzerland
20:45 UTC+1	Arlauskis 66' (o.g.); Schär 68'; Shaqiri 80', 90'	Report		Stadium: AFG Arena; Attendance: 17,300; Referee: Svein Oddvar Moen (Norway)

18 November 2014 Friendly	Poland	2–2	Switzerland	Wrocław, Poland
20:45 UTC+1	Jędrzejczyk 45+1'; Milik 61'	Report	Drmic 14'; Frei 87'	Stadium: Wrocław Stadium; Attendance: 40,133; Referee: Kristinn Jakobsson (Iceland)

=== 2015 ===
27 March 2015 Euro 2016 qualifying	Switzerland	3–0	Estonia	Lucerne, Switzerland
20:45 UTC+1	Schär 17'; Xhaka 27'; Seferovic 80'	Report		Stadium: Swissporarena; Attendance: 14,500; Referee: Danny Makkelie (Netherlands)

31 March 2015 Friendly	Switzerland	1–1	United States	Zürich, Switzerland
18:00 UTC+1	Stocker 80'	Report	Shea 45'	Stadium: Stadion Letzigrund; Attendance: 16,100; Referee: Luca Banti (Italy)

10 June 2015 Friendly	Switzerland	3–0	Liechtenstein	Thun, Switzerland
20:15 UTC+2	Džemaili 29', 68'; Shaqiri 60'	Report		Stadium: Stockhorn Arena; Attendance: 8,100; Referee: Richard Trutz (Slovakia)

14 June 2015 Euro 2016 qualifying	Lithuania	1–2	Switzerland	Vilnius, Lithuania
21:45 UTC+3	Černych 64'	Report	Drmić 69'; Shaqiri 84'	Stadium: LFF Stadium; Attendance: 4,786; Referee: Craig Thomson (Scotland)

5 September 2015 Euro 2016 qualifying	Switzerland	3–2	Slovenia	Basel, Switzerland
20:45 UTC+2	Drmić 80', 90+4'; Stocker 84'	Report	Novaković 45'; Cesar 48'	Stadium: St. Jakob-Park; Attendance: 25,750; Referee: Pavel Královec (Czech Republic)

8 September 2015 Euro 2016 qualifying	England	2–0	Switzerland	London, England
19:45 UTC+1	Kane 67'; Rooney 84' (pen.)	Report		Stadium: Wembley Stadium; Attendance: 75,751; Referee: Gianluca Rocchi (Italy)

9 October 2015 Euro 2016 qualifying	Switzerland	7–0	San Marino	St. Gallen, Switzerland
20:45 UTC+2	Lang 17'; Inler 55' (pen.); Mehmedi 65'; Djourou 72' (pen.); Kasami 75'; Embolo 80' (pen.); Derdiyok 89'	Report		Stadium: AFG Arena; Attendance: 16,200; Referee: Mattias Gestranius (Finland)

12 October 2015 Euro 2016 qualifying	Estonia	0–1	Switzerland	Tallinn, Estonia
21:45 UTC+3		Report	Klavan 90+4' (o.g.)	Stadium: A. Le Coq Arena; Attendance: 7,304; Referee: Pol van Boekel (Netherlands)

13 November 2015 Friendly	Slovakia	3–2	Switzerland	Trnava, Slovakia
20:45 UTC+1	Ďuriš 39', 48'; Mak 55'	Report	Derdiyok 63'; Drmić 67'	Stadium: Štadión Antona Malatinského; Attendance: 17,582; Referee: Miroslav Zelinka (Czech Republic)

17 November 2015 Friendly	Austria	1–2	Switzerland	Vienna, Austria
19:45 UTC+1	Alaba 13'	Report	Seferović 9', 38'	Stadium: Ernst-Happel Stadion; Attendance: 27,600; Referee: Manuel Gräfe (Germany)

=== 2016 ===
25 March 2016 Friendly	Republic of Ireland	1–0	Switzerland	Dublin, Ireland
19:45 UTC+0	C. Clark 2'	Report		Stadium: Aviva Stadium; Attendance: 35,450; Referee: Miroslav Zelinka (Czech Republic)

29 March 2016 Friendly	Switzerland	0–2	Bosnia and Herzegovina	Zurich, Switzerland
20:30 UTC+1		Report	Džeko 14'; Pjanić 57'	Stadium: Letzigrund; Attendance: 17,000; Referee: Sébastien Delferière (Belgium)

28 May 2016 Friendly	Switzerland	1–2	Belgium	Genève, Switzerland
16:15 UTC+2	Džemaili 31'	Report	R. Lukaku 34'; De Bruyne 83'	Stadium: Stade de Genève; Attendance: 20,000; Referee: Paolo Mazzoleni (Italy)

3 June 2016 Friendly	Switzerland	2–1	Moldova	Lugano, Switzerland
18:00 UTC+2	Namaşco 12' (o.g.); Mehmedi 75'	Report	Gînsari 69'	Stadium: Cornaredo Stadium; Attendance: 5,700; Referee: Alejandro Hernández (Spain)

11 June 2016 Euro 2016 Group A	Albania	0–1	Switzerland	Lens, France
15:00 UTC+2		Report	Schär 5'	Stadium: Stade Bollaert-Delelis; Attendance: 33,805; Referee: Carlos Velasco Carballo (Spain)

15 June 2016 Euro 2016 Group A	Romania	1–1	Switzerland	Paris, France
18:00 UTC+2	Stancu 18' (pen.)	Report	Mehmedi 57'	Stadium: Parc des Princes; Attendance: 43,576; Referee: Sergei Karasev (Russia)

19 June 2016 Euro 2016 Group A	Switzerland	0–0	France	Lille, France
21:00 UTC+2		Report		Stadium: Stade Pierre-Mauroy; Attendance: 45,616; Referee: Damir Skomina (Slovenia)

25 June 2016 Euro 2016 R16	Switzerland	1–1 (a.e.t.) (4–5 p)	Poland	Saint-Étienne, France
15:00 UTC+2	Shaqiri 82'	Report	Błaszczykowski 39'	Stadium: Stade Geoffroy-Guichard; Attendance: 38,842; Referee: Mark Clattenburg (England)
	Penalties
	Lichtsteiner (penalty scored); Xhaka (penalty missed); Shaqiri (penalty scored); Schär (penalty scored); Rodríguez (penalty scored)		(penalty scored) Lewandowski; (penalty scored) Milik; (penalty scored) Glik; (penalty scored) Błaszczykowski; (penalty scored) Krychowiak

6 September 2016 2018 World Cup qualification	Switzerland	2–0	Portugal	Basel, Switzerland
20:45 UTC+2	Embolo 24'; Mehmedi 30'	Report		Stadium: St. Jakob-Park; Attendance: 36,000; Referee: Antonio Mateu Lahoz (Spain)

7 October 2016 2018 World Cup qualification	Hungary	2–3	Switzerland	Budapest, Hungary
20:45 UTC+2	Szalai 53', 71'	Report (FIFA); Report (UEFA)	Seferovic 51'; Rodríguez 67'; Stocker 89'	Stadium: Groupama Arena; Attendance: 21,668; Referee: Björn Kuipers (Netherlands)

10 October 2016 2018 World Cup qualification	Andorra	1–2	Switzerland	Andorra la Vella, Andorra
20:45 UTC+2	A. Martínez 90+1'	Report (FIFA); Report (UEFA)	Schär 19' (pen.); Mehmedi 77'	Stadium: Estadi Nacional; Attendance: 2,014; Referee: John Beaton (Scotland)

13 November 2016 2018 World Cup qualification	Switzerland	2–0	Faroe Islands	Lucerne, Switzerland
18:00 UTC+1	Derdiyok 27'; Lichtsteiner 83'	Report (FIFA); Report (UEFA)		Stadium: Swissporarena; Attendance: 14,800; Referee: Sébastien Delferière (Belgium)

=== 2017 ===
25 March 2017 2018 World Cup qualification	Switzerland	1–0	Latvia	Geneva, Switzerland
18:00 UTC+1	Drmić 66'	Report (FIFA); Report (UEFA)		Stadium: Stade de Genève; Attendance: 25,000; Referee: Vladislav Bezborodov (Russia)

1 June 2017 Friendly	Switzerland	1–0	Belarus	Neuchâtel, Switzerland
20:45 UTC+2	Shaqiri 9'	Report		Stadium: Stade de la Maladière; Attendance: 10,200; Referee: Radek Příhoda (Czech Republic)

9 June 2017 2018 World Cup qualification	Faroe Islands	0–2	Switzerland	Tórshavn, Faroe Islands
20:45 UTC+2		Report (FIFA); Report (UEFA)	Xhaka 36'; Shaqiri 59'	Stadium: Tórsvøllur; Attendance: 4,594; Referee: Luca Banti (Italy)

31 August 2017 2018 World Cup qualification	Switzerland	3–0	Andorra	St. Gallen, Switzerland
20:45 UTC+2	Seferovic 43', 63'; Lichtsteiner 67'	Report (FIFA); Report (UEFA)		Stadium: kybunpark Attendance: 13,600; Referee: Tore Hansen (Norway)

3 September 2017 2018 World Cup qualification	Latvia	0–3	Switzerland	Riga, Latvia
21:45 UTC+3		Report (FIFA); Report (UEFA)	Seferovic 9'; Džemaili 54'; Rodríguez 58' (pen.)	Stadium: Skonto Stadium; Attendance: 7,587; Referee: Serdar Gözübüyük (Netherlands)

7 October 2017 2018 World Cup qualification	Switzerland	5–2	Hungary	Basel, Switzerland
20:45 UTC+2	Xhaka 18'; Frei 20'; Zuber 43', 49'; Lichtsteiner 83'	Report (FIFA); Report (UEFA)	Guzmics 59'; Ugrai 89'	Stadium: St. Jakob-Park; Attendance: 32,018; Referee: Paolo Tagliavento (Italy)

10 October 2017 2018 World Cup qualification	Portugal	2–0	Switzerland	Lisbon, Portugal
19:45 UTC+1	Djourou 41' (o.g.); A. Silva 57'	Report		Stadium: Estádio da Luz; Attendance: 61,566; Referee: Cüneyt Çakir (Turkey)

9 November 2017 2018 World Cup qualification Playoffs	Northern Ireland	0–1	Switzerland	Belfast, Northern Ireland
19:45 UTC+0		Report	Rodríguez 58' (pen.)	Stadium: Windsor Park; Attendance: 18,269; Referee: Ovidiu Hațegan (Romania)

12 November 2017 2018 World Cup qualification Playoffs	Switzerland	0–0 (1–0 agg.)	Northern Ireland	Basel, Switzerland
18:00 UTC+0		Report		Stadium: St. Jakob-Park; Attendance: 36,000; Referee: Felix Brych (Germany)
Note: Switzerland won 1–0 on aggregate and qualified for the 2018 FIFA World Cup.

=== 2018 ===
23 March 2018 Friendly	Greece	0–1	Switzerland	Athens, Greece
20:00 UTC+1		Report	Džemaili 59'	Stadium: Olympic Stadium; Attendance: 5,487; Referee: Hugo Miguel (Portugal)

27 March 2018 Friendly	Switzerland	6–0	Panama	Lucerne, Switzerland
19:00 UTC+2	Džemaili 22'; Xhaka 31' (pen.); Embolo 33'; Zuber 39'; Gavranovic 49'; Frei 68'	Report		Stadium: Swissporarena; Attendance: 8,600; Referee: Oliver Drachta (Austria)

3 June 2018 Friendly	Spain	1–1	Switzerland	Villarreal, Spain
21:00 UTC+2	Odriozola 29'	Report	Rodríguez 62'	Stadium: Estadio de la Cerámica; Attendance: 18,350; Referee: István Kovács (Romania)

8 June 2018 Friendly	Switzerland	2–0	Japan	Lugano, Switzerland
19:00 UTC+2	Rodríguez 42' (pen.); Seferovic 82'	Report		Stadium: Cornaredo Stadium; Attendance: 7,010; Referee: Amaury Delerue (France)

17 June 2018 2018 World Cup Group E	Brazil	1–1	Switzerland	Rostov-on-Don, Russia
21:00 UTC+3	Coutinho 20'	Report	Zuber 50'	Stadium: Rostov Arena; Attendance: 43,109; Referee: César Arturo Ramos (Mexico)

22 June 2018 2018 World Cup Group E	Serbia	1–2	Switzerland	Kaliningrad, Russia
20:00 UTC+2	Mitrović 5'	Report	Xhaka 52'; Shaqiri 90'	Stadium: Kaliningrad Stadium; Attendance: 33,167; Referee: Felix Brych (Germany)

27 June 2018 2018 World Cup Group E	Switzerland	2–2	Costa Rica	Nizhny Novgorod, Russia
21:00 UTC+3	Džemaili 31'; Drmić 88'	Report	Waston 56'; Sommer 90+3' (o.g.)	Stadium: Nizhny Novgorod Stadium; Attendance: 43,319; Referee: Clément Turpin (France)

3 July 2018 2018 World Cup R16	Sweden	1–0	Switzerland	Saint Petersburg, Russia
17:00 UTC+3	Forsberg 66'	Report		Stadium: Krestovsky Stadium; Attendance: 64,042; Referee: Damir Skomina (Slovenia)

8 September 2018 2018–19 Nations League	Switzerland	6–0	Iceland	St. Gallen, Switzerland
18:00 UTC+2	Zuber 13'; Zakaria 23'; Shaqiri 53'; Seferovic 67'; Ajeti 71'; Mehmedi 82'	Report		Stadium: Kybunpark; Attendance: 14,912; Referee: Michael Oliver (England)

11 September 2018 Friendly	England	1–0	Switzerland	Leicester, England
20:00 UTC+1	Rashford 54'	Report		Stadium: King Power Stadium; Attendance: 30,256; Referee: Clément Turpin (France)

12 October 2018 2018–19 Nations League	Belgium	2–1	Switzerland	Brussels, Belgium
20:45 UTC+2	Lukaku 58', 84'	Report	Gavranović 76'	Stadium: King Baudouin Stadium; Attendance: 39,049; Referee: Antonio Mateu Lahoz (Spain)

15 October 2018 2018–19 Nations League	Iceland	1–2	Switzerland	Reykjavík, Iceland
19:45 UTC+1	Finnbogason 81'	Report	Seferovic 52'; Lang 67'	Stadium: Laugardalsvöllur; Attendance: 8,663; Referee: Andreas Ekberg (Sweden)

14 November 2018 Friendly	Switzerland	0–1	Qatar	Lugano, Switzerland
19:00 UTC+1		Report	Afif 86'	Stadium: Cornaredo Stadium; Attendance: 4,170; Referee: Kevin Blom (Netherlands)

18 November 2018 2018–19 Nations League	Switzerland	5–2	Belgium	Lucerne, Switzerland
20:45 UTC+1	Rodriguez 26' (pen.); Seferovic 31', 44', 84'; Elvedi 62'	Report	T. Hazard 2', 17'	Stadium: Swissporarena; Attendance: 15,000; Referee: Daniele Orsato (Italy)

=== 2019 ===
23 March 2019 Euro 2020 qualifying	Georgia	0–2	Switzerland	Tbilisi, Georgia
18:00 UTC+4		Report	Zuber 56'; Zakaria 80'	Stadium: Boris Paichadze Dinamo Arena; Attendance: 49,207; Referee: Craig Pawson (England)

26 March 2019 Euro 2020 qualifying	Switzerland	3–3	Denmark	Basel, Switzerland
20:45 UTC+1	Freuler 19'; Xhaka 66'; Embolo 76'	Report	M. Jørgensen 84'; Gytkjær 88'; Dalsgaard 90+3'	Stadium: St. Jakob-Park; Attendance: 18,352; Referee: Damir Skomina (Slovenia)

5 June 2019 2019 Nations League SF	Portugal	3–1	Switzerland	Porto, Portugal
20:45 UTC+1	Ronaldo 25', 88', 90'	Report	Rodriguez 57' (pen.)	Stadium: Estádio do Dragão; Attendance: 42,415; Referee: Felix Brych (Germany)

9 June 2019 2019 Nations League 3rd	Switzerland	0–0 (a.e.t.) (5–6 p)	England	Guimarães, Portugal
15:00 UTC+1		Report		Stadium: Estádio D. Afonso Henriques; Attendance: 15,742; Referee: Ovidiu Hațegan (Romania)
	Penalties
	Zuber (penalty scored); Xhaka (penalty scored); Akanji (penalty scored); Mbabu (penalty scored); Schär (penalty scored); Drmić (penalty missed)		(penalty scored) Maguire; (penalty scored) Barkley; (penalty scored) Sancho; (penalty scored) Sterling; (penalty scored) Pickford; (penalty scored) Dier

5 September 2019 Euro 2020 qualifying	Republic of Ireland	1–1	Switzerland	Dublin, Ireland
19:45 UTC+1	McGoldrick 85'	Report	Schär 74'	Stadium: Aviva Stadium; Attendance: 44,111; Referee: Carlos del Cerro Grande (Spain)

8 September 2019 Euro 2020 qualifying	Switzerland	4–0	Gibraltar	Sion, Switzerland
18:00 UTC+2	Zakaria 37'; Mehmedi 43'; Rodríguez 45+4'; Gavranović 87'	Report		Stadium: Stade Tourbillon; Attendance: 8,318; Referee: Pavel Orel (Czech Republic)

12 October 2019 Euro 2020 qualifying	Denmark	1–0	Switzerland	Copenhagen, Denmark
18:00 UTC+2	Poulsen 84'	Report		Stadium: Parken Stadium; Attendance: 35,964; Referee: Aleksei Kulbakov (Belarus)

15 October 2019 Euro 2020 qualifying	Switzerland	2–0	Republic of Ireland	Geneva, Switzerland
20:45 UTC+2	Seferovic 16'; Fernandes 90+3'	Report		Stadium: Stade de Genève; Attendance: 24,766; Referee: Szymon Marciniak (Poland)

15 November 2019 Euro 2020 qualifying	Switzerland	1–0	Georgia	St. Gallen, Switzerland
20:45 UTC+1	Itten 77'	Report		Stadium: Kybunpark; Attendance: 16,400; Referee: Danny Makkelie (Netherlands)

18 November 2019 Euro 2020 qualifying	Gibraltar	1–6	Switzerland	Gibraltar
20:45 UTC+1	Styche 74'	Report	Itten 10', 84'; Vargas 50'; Fassnacht 57'; Benito 75'; Xhaka 86'	Stadium: Victoria Stadium; Attendance: 2,079; Referee: Benoît Millot (France)
