= Yu Genwei =

Chinese footballer

Yu Genwei 于根伟
Personal information
- Full name: Yu Genwei
- Date of birth: 7 January 1974 (age 52)
- Place of birth: Tianjin, China
- Height: 1.80 m (5 ft 11 in)
- Positions: Forward; attacking midfielder; winger

Team information
- Current team: Tianjin Jinmen Tiger (head coach)

Senior career*
Years	Team	Apps	(Gls)
1994–2005	Tianjin TEDA	197	(78)

International career
1997–2004	China	22	(2)

Managerial career
- 2007–2009: Tianjin TEDA (assistant)
- 2021–: Tianjin Jinmen Tiger
- 2022: China (assistant)
Medal record
Representing China
Men's football
AFC U-16 Championship
Gold medal – first place	1992 Saudi Arabia	Team
- * Club domestic league appearances and goals

Yu Genwei (Chinese: 于根伟; born 7 January 1974) is a Chinese football coach and former footballer who is currently the head coach of Chinese Super League club Tianjin Jinmen Tiger, where he also spent his entire playing career (formerly named Tianjin Teda) as an attacking midfielder or striker. Internationally he played for the Chinese football team where he was a participant at the 2002 FIFA World Cup.

== Club career ==
Beginning his football career for Tianjin team as a promising right winger. Since the 1994 league season, he quickly established himself as an attacking midfielder when he scored 10 league goals and helped Tianjin win promotion to the top tier. He would help establish Tianjin as a regular within the top tier and would even personally win the Chinese Football Association Young Player of the Year at the end of the 1996 league season. By the 1997 league season Tianjin would have a disappointing season when they came eleventh in the league and were relegated from the top tier. Yu Genwei would however stay with Tianjin throughout the 1998 league season to help fight for immediate promotion which they achieved when they won the second tier. Once more within the top tier Yu Genwei would remain with Tianjin for the rest of his career to help establish them in the top tier.

== International career ==
After Yu Genwei had just won the 1996 CFA Young Player of the Year award he would go on to be promoted to the Chinese senior team and make his debut in a friendly against South Korea on 30 August 1997 in a 0–0 draw. His performance was considered good enough to be included in several squads to play in China's unsuccessful 1998 FIFA World Cup qualification campaign, however due to his drop in form and Tianjin's relegation at the end of 1997 league campaign he would be excluded from future squads until he picked up his form. After finding his goalscoring form and with Tianjin back playing in the top tier Yu would be given another chance to play for the China once again when the new Chinese Head coach Bora Milutinović included him in a friendly game against North Korea on 3 August 2001 in a 2–2 draw. On 7 2001, he scored his first international goal in a 1-0 home win against Oman in a vital 2002 FIFA World Cup qualification game that saw China qualify for the World Cup for the first time. He was selected in the World Cup squad in the following and played 2 of China's 3 group stage games.

== Managerial career ==
In April 2021, Yu was appointed as the manager of the financially troubled Tianjin Jinmen Tigers (formerly named Tianjin Teda), which was his first independent coaching appointment, and eventually led the team to miraculously stay up at the end of the season. As the club's financial state improved, Yu led the team to consecutive 8th finishes in the 2022 and 2023 season. In 2023 he led Tianjin to an undefeated home record all season and achieved the longest unbeaten run in the league (16 games), he also became Tianjin's longest serving manager in the Chinese Super league era this year.

== International goals ==
No.	Date	Venue	Opponent	Score	Result	Competition
1.	7 October 2001	Wulihe Stadium, Shenyang, China	Oman	1–0	1–0	2002 FIFA World Cup qualification
2.	17 November 2004	Tianhe Stadium, Guangzhou, China	Hong Kong	6–0	7–0	2006 FIFA World Cup qualification

== Honours ==
=== Club ===
- Jia B League: 1998

=== Individual ===
- CFA Young Player of the Year: 1996

== Managerial statistics ==
As of 26 April 2023.

Nat.	Team	From	To	Record							
Nat.	Team	From	To	G	W	D	L	GF	GA	GD	Win %
(China)	Tianjin TEDA	26 March 2021	Present	63	23	14	26	75	84	−9	36.51
