= Emad Mohammed =

Iraqi footballer and coach (born 1982)

Personal information
- Full name: Emad Mohammed Ridha
- Date of birth: 24 July 1982 (age 44)
- Place of birth: Karbala, Iraq
- Height: 1.70 m (5 ft 7 in)
- Position: Forward

Team information
- Current team: Iraq U23 (Manager)

Youth career
- 1992–1998: Karbalaa

Senior career*
Years	Team	Apps	(Gls)
1998–2002	Al-Zawraa		
2002	Al-Ittihad		
2002–2003	Al-Zawraa		
2003–2004	Al-Ittihad	18	(7)
2004–2005	Al-Wakrah	30	(11)
2005–2006	Foolad	14	(8)
2006–2010	Sepahan	104	(50)
2010–2011	Zamalek	2	(0)
2011	→ Shahin Bushehr (loan)	11	(3)
2011–2012	Sepahan	22	(9)
2012–2014	Al-Zawraa		(6)

International career
2000–2012	Iraq	103	(27)

Managerial career
- 2014–2015: Al-Zawraa
- 2015–2016: Al-Najaf
- 2016–2017: Al-Najaf
- 2018: Naft Al-Wasat
- 2019–2021: Iraq U17
- 2021–2025: Iraq U20
- 2025–: Iraq U23
- * Club domestic league appearances and goals

Emad Mohammed Ridha (Arabic: عِمَاد مُحَمَّد رِضَا, born 24 July 1982) is a coach and former Iraqi football striker, currently managing Iraq U23.

== Club career ==
On 25 June 2007, Emad renewed his contract with Sepahan for another season in a deal thought to be worth in the region of $600,000.

== International career ==
Mohammed made his full international debut on 31 January 2000, against Lebanon in Beirut in a 0–0 draw.

== Managerial career ==
=== Start with Al-Zawraa ===
Emad Mohammed started his managerial career with hometown club Al-Zawraa. He retired from his playing career mid-season in 2014 to take over from Jamal Ali. The young manager did well in the regular season, finishing second in group A, level on points with Al Jawiya. However, Al Zawra'a massively underperformed in the playoffs, finishing dead last in group 1. Al Zawra'a decided not to extend his contract for the following season.

=== Al Najaf ===
Emad took over 7 games into the next season from the resigning Ali Wahab. The team ended up finishing 7th in group B, easily avoiding relegation. Emad was rehired the following season, replacing his replacement, Hatif Shamran. Al Najaf finished in 9th place overall, with 49 points. The team was knocked out in the round of 16 of the Iraqi FA Cup due to the team forfeiting their match against Amanat Baghdad. Al Najaf chose not to renew his contract once again.

=== Naft Al Wasat ===
Emad was appointed as manager of Naft Al Wasat on 5 February 2018 to replace Adil Nima. Prior to that, he rejected working for Al Talaba, due to the poor administrative state. He was sacked 7 rounds before the end of the season. A picture on the internet went viral the day of his sacking, a conversation between him and Al Zawraa player Ali Rehema, agreeing to fix the match for the latter. The picture turned out to be a hoax.

=== Iraq U20 ===
Emad was appointed as U20 manager on 7 May 2021. In the 2023 AFC U-20 Asian Cup, Iraq finished as runners-up and qualified for the 2023 FIFA U-20 World Cup.

== Career statistics ==
=== International ===
Appearances and goals by national team and year
National team	Year	Apps	Goals
Iraq	2001	16	7
Iraq	2002	8	1
Iraq	2003	–	
Iraq	2004	17	5
Iraq	2005	6	1
Iraq	2006	12	5
Iraq	2007	5	2
Iraq	2008	8	2
Iraq	2009	9	1
Iraq	2010	7	2
Iraq	2011	13	1
Iraq	2012	2	0
Total		103	27

Scores and results list Iraq's goal tally first, score column indicates score after each Mohammed goal.

List of international goals scored by Emad Mohammed
No.	Date	Venue	Opponent	Score	Result	Competition
1	14 April 2001	Al-Shaab Stadium, Baghdad, Iraq	Nepal	6–1	9–1	2002 FIFA World Cup qualification
2	23 April 2001	Almaty Central Stadium, Almaty, Kazakhstan	Nepal	3–0	4–2	2002 FIFA World Cup qualification
3	2 August 2001	Al Nahyan Stadium, Abu Dhabi, United Arab Emirates	United Arab Emirates	2–0	2–2	Friendly
4	17 August 2001	Al-Shaab Stadium, Baghdad, Iraq	Thailand	2–0	4–0	2002 FIFA World Cup qualification
5	7 September 2001	Al-Shaab Stadium, Baghdad, Iraq	Iran	1–0	1–2	2002 FIFA World Cup qualification
6	22 September 2001	Rajamangala Stadium, Bangkok, Thailand	Thailand	1–1	1–1	2002 FIFA World Cup qualification
7	28 September 2001	Al-Shaab Stadium, Baghdad, Iraq	Bahrain	1–0	1–0	2002 FIFA World Cup qualification
8	22 July 2002	Al-Shaab Stadium, Baghdad, Iraq	Syria	1–0	2–1	Friendly
9	19 June 2004	Azadi Stadium, Tehran, Iran	Palestine	1–1	2–1	2004 WAFF Championship
10	19 June 2004	Azadi Stadium, Tehran, Iran	Palestine	2–1	2–1	2004 WAFF Championship
11	25 June 2004	Azadi Stadium, Tehran, Iran	Jordan	1–3	1–3	2004 WAFF Championship
12	16 November 2004	Al-Gharafa Stadium, Doha, Qatar	Palestine	3–0	4–1	2006 FIFA World Cup qualification
13	3 December 2004	Al-Maktoum Stadium, Dubai, United Arab Emirates	Yemen	3–1	3–1	Friendly
14	5 December 2005	Ahmed bin Ali Stadium, Al Rayyan, Qatar	Saudi Arabia	2–0	5–1	2005 West Asian Games
15	16 February 2006	Ayutthaya Stadium, Bangkok, Thailand	Thailand	1–1	3–4	Friendly
16	16 February 2006	Ayutthaya Stadium, Bangkok, Thailand	Thailand	2–3	3–4	Friendly
17	16 February 2006	Ayutthaya Stadium, Bangkok, Thailand	Thailand	3–4	3–4	Friendly
18	15 July 2006	Al Abbassiyyine Stadium, Damascus, Syria	Syria	1–0	3–1	Friendly
19	25 July 2006	Al Abbassiyyine Stadium, Damascus, Syria	Syria	1–0	2–1	Friendly
20	16 October 2007	Thani bin Jassim Stadium, Doha, Qatar	Qatar	2–2	2–3	Friendly
21	22 October 2007	Punjab Stadium, Lahore, Pakistan	Pakistan	5–0	7–0	2010 FIFA World Cup qualification
22	7 June 2008	Al-Rashid Stadium, Dubai, United Arab Emirates	Australia	1–0	1–0	2002 FIFA World Cup qualification
23	14 June 2008	Tianjin Olympic Centre Stadium, Tianjin, China	China	1–1	2–1	2010 FIFA World Cup qualification
24	13 July 2009	Al-Shaab Stadium, Baghdad, Iraq	Palestine	4–0	4–0	Friendly
25	12 October 2010	Khalifa International Stadium, Doha, Qatar	Qatar	1–0	2–1	Friendly
26	12 October 2010	Khalifa International Stadium, Doha, Qatar	Qatar	2–1	2–1	Friendly
27	6 November 2011	Grand Hamad Stadium, Doha, Qatar	Lebanon	1–0	1–0	Friendly

=== Managerial statistics ===
As of 28 May 2023

Team	From	To	Record				
Team	From	To	G	W	D	L	Win %
Al-Zawraa	6 October 2014	30 June 2015	22	9	5	8	40.91
Al-Najaf	29 October 2015	3 March 2016	11	4	1	6	36.36
Al-Najaf	1 October 2016	10 August 2017	34	12	12	10	35.29
Naft Al-Wasat	7 February 2018	4 June 2018	16	4	9	3	25.00
Iraq U16	5 March 2019	7 May 2021	7	3	2	2	42.86
Iraq U19	7 May 2021	""Present""	25	10	6	9	40.00
Total			111	41	33	37	36.94

== Honours ==
=== Player ===
==== Country ====
- 2002 WAFF Champions
- 4th place in 2004 Athens Olympics
- 2005 West Asian Games Gold medallist.

==== Club ====
- Iran's Premier Football League
  - Winner: 2
    - 2009/10 with Sepahan
    - 2011/12 with Sepahan
- Asian Champions League

Runner Up (1): 2007 with Sepahan

- Iraqi Premier League
  - Winner:3
    - 1999 with Al-Zawra'a SC
    - 2000 with Al-Zawra'a SC
    - 2001 with Al-Zawra'a SC
- Qatar Stars League
  - Winner:1
    - 2002 with Al-Gharafa Sports Club
    - 2010/2011 with Zamalek SC
- Emir of Qatar Cup
  - Winner:1
    - 2002 with Al-Gharafa Sports Club
- Iraq FA Cup
  - Winner:3
    - 1998 with Al-Zawra'a SC
    - 1999 with Al-Zawra'a SC
    - 2000 with Al-Zawra'a SC
- Hazfi Cup
  - Winner: 1
    - 2006/07 with Sepahan
  - Runner Up:1
    - 2011–2012 with Shahin Bushehr F.C.
- Egypt Cup
  - Winner:1
    - 2011 with Zamalek SC

=== Manager ===
Iraq national under-20 football team

- West Asian Federation U18 Championship 2021

==== Individual ====
- Iraq Super League young player (1998–1999).
- Top scorer of AFC Youth Championship 2000 (4 goals).
- Runner-up top scorer of FIFA Club World Cup 2007 with Sepahan
- Best scorer of Sepahan 2008-2009 (14 goals)
- 2009/10 Iran Pro League top goalscorer with 19 goals with Sepahan

== See also ==
- List of men's footballers with 100 or more international caps

Sporting positions
Preceded by (Iran) Arash Borhani	Persian Gulf Cup top scorer 2009–10	Succeeded by (Iran) Reza Norouzi
