= 2002 FIFA World Cup qualification (AFC) =

Tournament details
- Dates: 24 November 2000 - 15 November 2001
- Teams: 39 (from 1 confederation)

Tournament statistics
- Matches played: 153
- Goals scored: 587 (3.84 per match)
- Attendance: 2,730,506 (17,846 per match)
- Top scorer(s): (Oman) Hani Al-Dhabit (Oman) Yaqoob Juma Al-Mukhaini (Saudi Arabia) Talal Al-Meshal (Syria) Said Bayazid (11 goals each)

Listed below are the dates and results for the 2002 FIFA World Cup qualification rounds for Asia.

The Asian Football Confederation was allocated four and half qualifying berths for the 2002 FIFA World Cup, South Korea and Japan, the co-hosts, qualified automatically, leaving two and half spots open for competition between 40 teams. Myanmar withdrew from the tournament after being placed in Group 2 but before any matches had been played, therefore reducing the group to 3 teams.

Afghanistan, Bhutan and North Korea chose not to participate.

Asia's two remaining automatic qualifying berths were taken by Saudi Arabia and China.

Iran defeated United Arab Emirates for the chance to become the possible third Asian qualifier, but lost to Ireland in the inter-continental play-off.

== Format ==
There were three rounds of play:

- First round: The 39 teams were divided into nine groups of four teams each, and one group of three teams. The teams played against each other twice, except in group 2, where the teams played against each other once. The group winners advanced to the second round.
- Second round: The 10 teams were divided into two groups of five teams. The teams played against each other on a home-and-away basis. The group winners qualified for the World Cup. The runners-up advanced to the AFC third round.
- Third round: The two teams played against each other on a home-and-away basis. The winner advanced to the UEFA–AFC inter-continental play-off.

== First round ==
=== Group 1 ===
Pos	Team	Pld	W	D	L	GF	GA	GD	Pts	Qualification	Oman national football team	Syria national football team	Laos national football team	Philippines national football team
1	Oman	6	5	1	0	33	3	+30	16	Second round	—	2–0	12–0	7–0
2	Syria	6	4	1	1	40	6	+34	13		3–3	—	11–0	12–0
3	Laos	6	1	1	4	3	40	−37	4		0–7	0–9	—	2–0
4	Philippines	6	0	1	5	2	29	−27	1		0–2	1–5	1–1	—

=== Group 2 ===
Pos	Team	Pld	W	D	L	GF	GA	GD	Pts	Qualification	Iran national football team	Tajikistan national football team	Guam national football team	Myanmar national football team
1	Iran	2	2	0	0	21	0	+21	6	Second round	—	2–0	19–0	—
2	Tajikistan	2	1	0	1	16	2	+14	3		—	—	16–0	—
3	Guam	2	0	0	2	0	35	−35	0		—	—	—	—
4	Myanmar	0	0	0	0	0	0	0	0	Withdrew	—	—	—	—

=== Group 3 ===
Pos	Team	Pld	W	D	L	GF	GA	GD	Pts	Qualification	Qatar national football team	Palestine national football team	Malaysia national football team	Hong Kong national football team
1	Qatar	6	5	1	0	14	3	+11	16	Second round	—	2–1	5–1	2–0
2	Palestine	6	2	1	3	8	9	−1	7		1–2	—	1–0	1–0
3	Malaysia	6	2	1	3	8	11	−3	7		0–0	4–3	—	2–0
4	Hong Kong	6	1	1	4	3	10	−7	4		0–3	1–1	2–1	—

=== Group 4 ===
Pos	Team	Pld	W	D	L	GF	GA	GD	Pts	Qualification	Bahrain national football team	Kuwait national football team	Kyrgyzstan national football team	Singapore national football team
1	Bahrain	6	5	0	1	9	4	+5	15	Second round	—	1–2	1–0	2–0
2	Kuwait	6	4	1	1	9	3	+6	13		0–1	—	2–0	1–1
3	Kyrgyzstan	6	1	1	4	3	9	−6	4		1–2	0–3	—	1–1
4	Singapore	6	0	2	4	3	8	−5	2		1–2	0–1	0–1	—

=== Group 5 ===
Pos	Team	Pld	W	D	L	GF	GA	GD	Pts	Qualification	Thailand national football team	Lebanon national football team	Sri Lanka national football team	Pakistan national football team
1	Thailand	6	5	1	0	20	5	+15	16	Second round	—	2–2	4–2	3–0
2	Lebanon	6	4	1	1	26	5	+21	13		1–2	—	4–0	6–0
3	Sri Lanka	6	1	1	4	8	20	−12	4		0–3	0–5	—	3–1
4	Pakistan	6	0	1	5	5	29	−24	1		0–6	1–8	3–3	—

=== Group 6 ===
Pos	Team	Pld	W	D	L	GF	GA	GD	Pts	Qualification	Iraq national football team	Kazakhstan national football team	Nepal national football team	Macau national football team
1	Iraq	6	4	2	0	28	5	+23	14	Second round	—	1–1	4–2	8–0
2	Kazakhstan	6	4	2	0	20	2	+18	14		1–1	—	4–0	3–0
3	Nepal	6	2	0	4	13	25	−12	6		1–9	0–6	—	4–1
4	Macau	6	0	0	6	2	31	−29	0		0–5	0–5	1–6	—

=== Group 7 ===
Pos	Team	Pld	W	D	L	GF	GA	GD	Pts	Qualification	Uzbekistan national football team	Turkmenistan national football team	Jordan national football team	Chinese Taipei national football team
1	Uzbekistan	6	4	2	0	20	5	+15	14	Second round	—	1–0	2–2	7–0
2	Turkmenistan	6	4	0	2	12	7	+5	12		2–5	—	2–0	1–0
3	Jordan	6	2	2	2	12	7	+5	8		1–1	1–2	—	6–0
4	Chinese Taipei	6	0	0	6	0	25	−25	0		0–4	0–5	0–2	—

=== Group 8 ===
Pos	Team	Pld	W	D	L	GF	GA	GD	Pts	Qualification	United Arab Emirates national football team	Yemen national football team	India national football team	Brunei national football team
1	United Arab Emirates	6	4	0	2	21	5	+16	12	Second round	—	3–2	1–0	4–0
2	Yemen	6	3	2	1	14	8	+6	11		2–1	—	3–3	1–0
3	India	6	3	2	1	11	5	+6	11		1–0	1–1	—	5–0
4	Brunei	6	0	0	6	0	28	−28	0		0–12	0–5	0–1	—

Source: RSSSF

=== Group 9 ===
Pos	Team	Pld	W	D	L	GF	GA	GD	Pts	Qualification	China national football team	Indonesia national football team	Maldives national football team	Cambodia national football team
1	China	6	6	0	0	25	3	+22	18	Second round	—	5–1	10–1	3–1
2	Indonesia	6	4	0	2	16	7	+9	12		0–2	—	5–0	6–0
3	Maldives	6	1	1	4	8	19	−11	4		0–1	0–2	—	6–0
4	Cambodia	6	0	1	5	2	22	−20	1		0–4	0–2	1–1	—

=== Group 10 ===
Pos	Team	Pld	W	D	L	GF	GA	GD	Pts	Qualification	Saudi Arabia national football team	Vietnam national football team	Bangladesh national football team	Mongolia national football team
1	Saudi Arabia (H)	6	6	0	0	30	0	+30	18	Second round	—	5–0	6–0	6–0
2	Vietnam	6	3	1	2	9	9	0	10		0–4	—	0–0	4–0
3	Bangladesh	6	1	2	3	5	15	−10	5		0–3	0–4	—	2–2
4	Mongolia	6	0	1	5	2	22	−20	1		0–6	0–1	0–3	—

(H) Hosts

== Second round ==
=== Group A ===
Pos	Team	Pld	W	D	L	GF	GA	GD	Pts	Qualification	Saudi Arabia national football team	Iran national football team	Bahrain national football team	Iraq national football team	Thailand national football team
1	Saudi Arabia	8	5	2	1	17	8	+9	17	2002 FIFA World Cup	—	2–2	1–1	1–0	4–1
2	Iran	8	4	3	1	10	7	+3	15	Third round	2–0	—	0–0	2–1	1–0
3	Bahrain	8	2	4	2	8	9	−1	10		0–4	3–1	—	2–0	1–1
4	Iraq	8	2	1	5	9	10	−1	7		1–2	1–2	1–0	—	4–0
5	Thailand	8	0	4	4	5	15	−10	4		1–3	0–0	1–1	1–1	—

=== Group B ===
Pos	Team	Pld	W	D	L	GF	GA	GD	Pts	Qualification	China national football team	United Arab Emirates national football team	Uzbekistan national football team	Qatar national football team	Oman national football team
1	China	8	6	1	1	13	2	+11	19	2002 FIFA World Cup	—	3–0	2–0	3–0	1–0
2	United Arab Emirates	8	3	2	3	10	11	−1	11	Third round	0–1	—	4–1	0–2	2–2
3	Uzbekistan	8	3	1	4	13	14	−1	10		1–0	0–1	—	2–1	5–0
4	Qatar	8	2	3	3	10	10	0	9		1–1	1–2	2–2	—	0–0
5	Oman	8	1	3	4	7	16	−9	6		0–2	1–1	4–2	0–3	—

== Third round ==
Team 1	Agg.	Team 2	1st leg	2nd leg
Iran	4–0	United Arab Emirates	1–0	3–0

== Inter-confederation play-offs ==
Team 1	Agg.	Team 2	1st leg	2nd leg
Republic of Ireland	2–1	Iran	2–0	0–1

== Qualified teams ==
The following four teams from AFC qualified for the final tournament.

Team	Qualified as	Qualified on	Previous appearances in FIFA World Cup^{1}
Japan	Hosts	31 May 1996	1 (1998)
South Korea	Hosts	31 May 1996	5 (1954, 1986, 1990, 1994, 1998)
Saudi Arabia	Second round group A winners	21 October 2001	2 (1994, 1998)
China	Second round group B winners	7 October 2001	0 (debut)

^{1} Bold indicates champions for that year. Italic indicates hosts for that year.

== Top goalscorers ==
There were 587 goals scored in 153 matches, for an average of 3.84 goals per match.

11 goals

- (Oman) Hani Al-Dhabit
- (Oman) Yaqoob Juma Al-Mukhaini
- (Saudi Arabia) Talal Al-Meshal
- (Syria) Said Bayazid

10 goals

- (Iran) Ali Daei
- (Saudi Arabia) Obeid Al-Dosari
- (Thailand) Kiatisuk Senamuang
- (United Arab Emirates) Yaser Salem Ali
- (Uzbekistan) Jafar Irismetov

9 goals

- (Iraq) Hesham Mohammed

8 goals

- (Iran) Karim Bagheri
- (Saudi Arabia) Sami Al-Jaber
- (Uzbekistan) Mirjalol Qosimov

Below are full goalscorer lists for each round:

- First round
- Second round
- Third round
