= 2005 Turkey v Switzerland football match =

Turkey v Switzerland
- Event: 2006 FIFA World Cup qualification
Turkey	Switzerland
4	2
- Date: 16 November 2005
- Venue: Şükrü Saracoğlu Stadium, Istanbul, Turkey
- Referee: Frank De Bleeckere (Belgium)
- Attendance: 42,000
- Weather: Partly cloudy 14 °C (57 °F)

The football match between Turkey and Switzerland in 2005, known in Switzerland as the "Shame of Istanbul", (Turkish: İstanbul'un Utancı, French: Honte d'Istanbul, German: Schande von Istanbul, Italian: La vergogna di Istanbul) was the second leg of the playoff round in the UEFA qualification for the 2006 FIFA World Cup. On 16 November 2005, Turkey played against Switzerland at the Şükrü Saracoğlu Stadium in Istanbul; Switzerland had won the first leg in Switzerland with a score of 2–0. After a heated game, Switzerland lost the second leg 2–4, but due to the away goals rule, they qualified for the World Cup. Shortly after the match ended, Switzerland national team was pelted with objects by Turkish supporters and confronted by a Turkish assistant coach. This led to physical altercations between members of both teams and security personnel.

== Background ==
Tensions were already high during the first leg: the Turkey national team was met with hostility in Switzerland, and their national anthem was booed before the game began. In anticipation of the return leg, there were revenge actions. At Istanbul Airport, the Switzerland national team received disrespectful treatment, with players—standing in line with journalists and fans—delayed at customs. Their baggage collection was delayed, and Turkish airport staff chanted battle songs, while Turkish fans greeted the team with banners reading "Welcome to Hell" and "Hurren Son Frei" (both in German). On their bus ride, the team's bus was pelted with eggs, tomatoes, and stones.

== Game summary ==
Switzerland scored an early goal just two minutes into the game. Following a handball by Alpay Özalan, Alexander Frei converted a penalty, putting Switzerland ahead. Adding both legs, Switzerland now led 3–0. Turkey needed four goals to qualify for the World Cup. Only four minutes after Switzerland's first goal, Hakan Şükür had a chance to equalize, but Pascal Zuberbühler blocked it. Turkey grew stronger throughout the game, and in the 24th minute, Tuncay Şanlı scored with a header, equalizing the match. The Switzerland national team was then pinned in their own penalty area. Ricardo Cabanas had a chance to score in the 35th minute, but Turkey took the lead 2–1 with another goal by Tuncay Şanlı shortly after. In the second half, after a duel between Swiss forward Marco Streller and Turkish player Serhat Akın, Belgian referee Frank De Bleeckere awarded a penalty to Turkey, which Necati Ateş converted in the 52nd minute, making it 3–1.

With an aggregate score of 3-3, Switzerland was still set to qualify for the World Cup due to the away goals rule. Hakan Şükür had a chance to make it 4–1 in the 62nd minute, but missed, and three minutes later, Frei missed from 11 meters out. Frei also missed another chance after a corner kick a few minutes later. Both teams received three yellow cards in the second half. Shots on the Swiss goal resumed in the 75th minute. Ergün Penbe narrowly missed in the 78th minute. A minute later, Marco Streller bypassed Turkish goalkeeper Volkan Demirel but missed the chance. A single goal would have secured Turkey's place in the 2006 World Cup. Instead, Switzerland successfully countered in the 84th minute, with Marco Streller scoring to make it 3–2. Four minutes later, Tuncay Şanlı scored again, bringing the final score to 4–2.

== Aftermath ==
Immediately after the final whistle, Swiss players ran to the locker room as Turkish fans threw objects at them. In the hallway to the locker room, there were attacks on Swiss substitute players by Turkish substitutes and security personnel. According to Switzerland national team's spokesman Pierre Benoît, reserve player Stéphane Grichting was kicked in the groin and had to be hospitalized. Goalkeeper coach Erich Burgener was hit in the eye by a projectile. The incidents were reportedly triggered by Turkish assistant coach Mehmet Özdilek, who was seen on television attempting to trip a Swiss player. In response, Swiss player Benjamin Huggel kicked Özdilek in the thigh.

== Reactions ==
Members of the Switzerland national team were shocked by the events. Swiss coach Köbi Kuhn described it as a "chase to the locker room." Player Raphael Wicky told the German magazine Stern: "They were beating us up." Some Turkish media accused FIFA President Sepp Blatter, a Swiss native, of being biased toward the Switzerland national team. Others in Turkey were more self-critical.

== Sanctions ==
The Turkish Football Federation was fined 200,000 Swiss francs (plus 20,000 francs in procedural costs). The national team was also banned from hosting six home games in Turkey. Individual players and officials from both teams were sanctioned as well. Emre Belözoğlu and Alpay Özalan each received a six-match suspension and were fined 15,000 francs (plus 1,000 francs in procedural costs), while Serkan Balcı received a two-match ban and a fine of 5,000 francs (plus 500 francs in procedural costs). Benjamin Huggel also received a six-match suspension and a fine of 15,000 francs (plus 500 francs in procedural costs). Turkish assistant coach Mehmet Özdilek was banned from all football activities under FIFA jurisdiction for one year and fined 15,000 francs (plus 1,000 francs in procedural costs). Switzerland national team physiotherapist Stephan Meyer was suspended for two games and fined 6,500 francs (plus 500 francs in procedural costs).

== Subsequent encounters ==
The next encounter between the two teams took place in the group stage of the UEFA Euro 2008, co-hosted by Austria and Switzerland. In that match, Switzerland took the lead through Hakan Yakin, a player of Turkish descent, but a late goal by Arda Turan gave Turkey a 2–1 victory, resulting in Switzerland's early elimination from the tournament.
