= Ghazi Al Kuwari =

Bahraini footballer

Personal information
- Date of birth: 19 May 1977 (age 49)
- Place of birth: Bahrain
- Position: Defender

Senior career*
Years	Team	Apps	(Gls)
1995–2003	East Riffa Club	-	(-)
2003–2004	Riffa SC	-	(-)
2004–2006	Al Ahli	-	(-)
2006–2015	Busaiteen Club	-	(-)

International career
1996–2005	Bahrain	46	(1)
- * Club domestic league appearances and goals

Ghazi Al Kuwari is a Bahrain football defender who played for Bahrain in the 2004 Asian Cup. He also played for East Riffa Club, Riffa SC, Al Ahli and Busaiteen Club.
