= Badar Al-Mahruqy =

Omani footballer (born 1979)

Personal information
- Full name: Bader Ali Al-Mahruqy
- Date of birth: 12 December 1979 (age 46)
- Place of birth: Oman
- Position: Defender

Team information
- Current team: Muscat

Senior career*
Years	Team	Apps	(Gls)
1998–2000	Fanja	?	
2000	Muscat		

International career
1997–2004	Oman	8	(2)
- * Club domestic league appearances and goals

Badar Ali Al-Mahruqy (Arabic: بدر علي المحروقي; born 12 December 1979), commonly known as Badar Al-Mahruqy, is an Omani footballer who plays for Muscat Club in the Oman First Division League.

== Club career statistics ==
Club	Season	Division	League		Cup		Continental		Other		Total	
Club	Season	Division	Apps	Goals	Apps	Goals	Apps	Goals	Apps	Goals	Apps	Goals
Muscat	2003–04	Omani League	-	6	-	0	0	0	-	0	-	8
Muscat	2004–05	Omani League	-	3	-	1	0	0	-	5	-	7
Muscat	Total		-	9	-	1	0	0	-	5	-	15
Career total			-	9	-	1	0	0	-	5	-	15

== International career ==
He was part of the first team squad of the Oman national football team till 2004. Badar was selected for the national team for the first time in 1997. He has made appearances in the 2002 FIFA World Cup qualification, the 2004 AFC Asian Cup qualification and 2006 FIFA World Cup qualification.
