= Abdulaziz Hassan Bujaloof =

Qatari footballer (born 1973)

Personal information
- Date of birth: 27 February 1973 (age 53)

Senior career*
Years	Team	Apps	(Gls)
1991–2006	Qatar SC		

International career
1992–2004	Qatar	86	(11)
- * Club domestic league appearances and goals

Abdulaziz Hassan Bujaloof (born 27 February 1973) is a Qatari footballer. He competed in the men's tournament at the 1992 Summer Olympics.

== Club career ==
Bujaloof spent his entire club career at Qatar SC, helping them achieve numerous titles.

== International career ==
Bujaloof made his debut against Oman in 1992. He would continue to play for the national team for twelve years, before retiring in 2004.
