= Khalid Al-Dawsari =

Saudi Arabian footballer

Personal information
- Full name: Khalid Abdullah Zaben Al-Dawsari
- Date of birth: May 23, 1986 (age 40)
- Place of birth: Saudi Arabia
- Height: 1.79 m (5 ft 10 1/2 in)
- Position: Left back

Youth career
- Hajer

Senior career*
Years	Team	Apps	(Gls)
2006–2008	Hajer		
2008–2009	Al-Fateh		
2009–2011	Al-Adalah		
2011–2012	Ohud		
2012–2014	Al-Orobah		
2014–2015	Hajer		
2015–2016	Al-Nahda		
2016–2017	Al-Shoalah		
2017–2018	Al-Ta'ee		
2018–2019	Al-Rawdhah		
2019–2020	Al-Najma		
- * Club domestic league appearances and goals

Khalid Al-Dawsari (Arabic: خالد الدوسري; born 23 May 1986) is a footballer who plays as a left back.
