= 2002 FIFA World Cup qualification – AFC third round =

Football tournament qualification stage

The AFC third round, also known as the AFC play-off, of 2002 FIFA World Cup qualification was held on 25 and 31 October 2001 between the two teams that finished second in the second round.

The winning team advanced to a play-off against a group runner-up from the European section, which would eventually be the Republic of Ireland. The winner of this playoff qualified for the 2002 World Cup finals.

== Summary ==
Team 1	Agg.	Team 2	1st leg	2nd leg
Iran	4–0	United Arab Emirates	1–0	3–0

== Matches ==
25 October 2001
17:30 UTC+03:30

Iran	1–0	United Arab Emirates
Bagheri 45'	Report

Azadi Stadium, Tehran
Attendance: 40,000
Referee: Kim Young-Joo (South Korea)
31 October 2001
18:30 UTC+04

United Arab Emirates	0–3	Iran
	Report	Daei 7'; Bagheri 76'; Minavand 79'

Al-Nahyan Stadium, Abu Dhabi
Attendance: 18,000
Referee: Toru Kamikawa (Japan)

Iran won 4–0 on aggregate and advanced to the UEFA–AFC inter-confederation play-off.

== Goalscorers ==
There were 4 goals scored in 2 matches, for an average of 2 goals per match.

2 goals

- (Iran) Karim Bagheri

1 goal

- (Iran) Ali Daei
- (Iran) Mehrdad Minavand
