= Wulihe Stadium =

Former sports venue in Shenyang, China

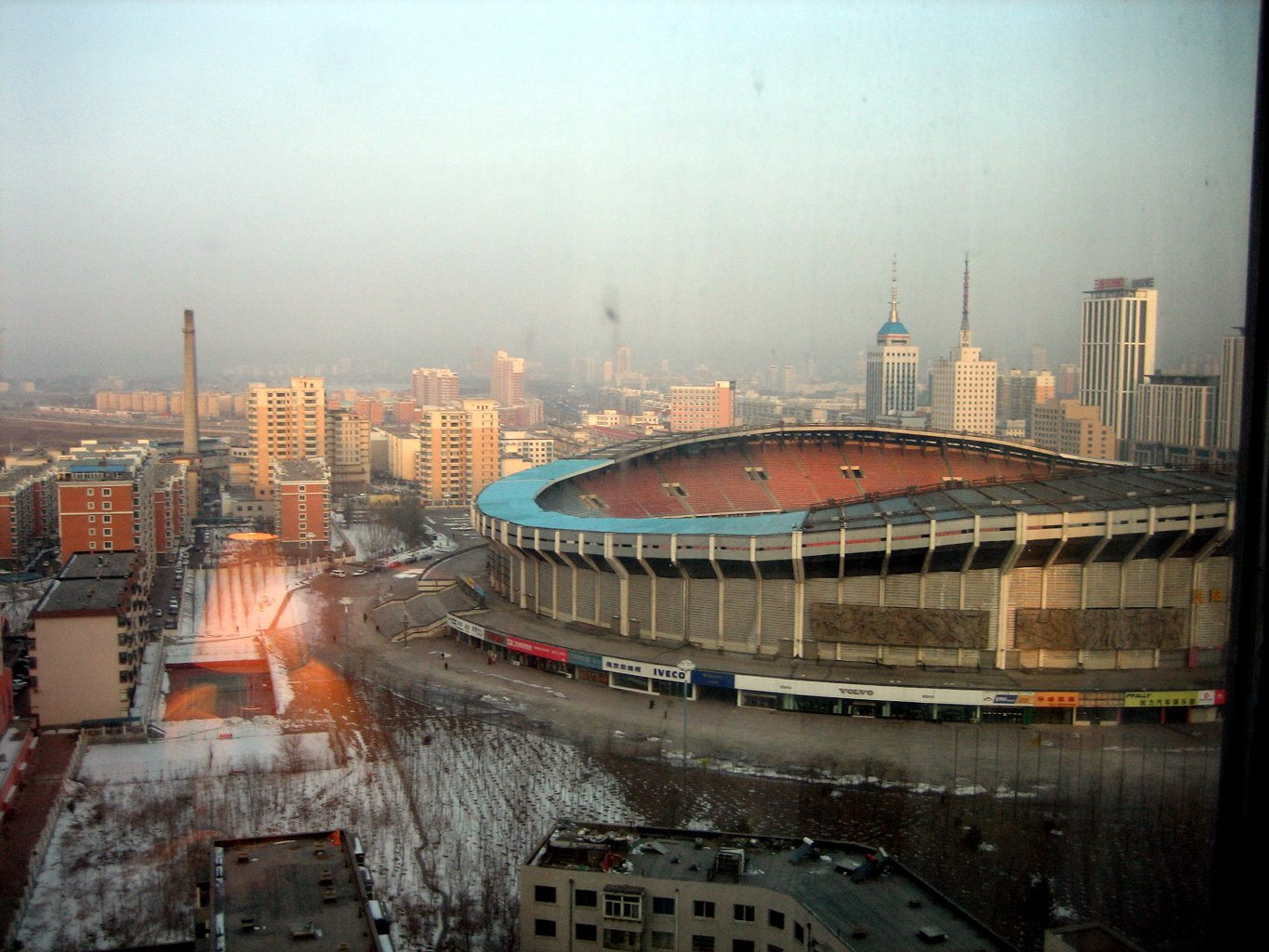
- Interactive map of Wulihe Stadium
- Location: Shenyang, China
- Coordinates: 41°45′22″N 123°25′33″E
- Capacity: 65,000

Construction
- Built: 1989
- Demolished: 2007

Wulihe Stadium (simplified Chinese: 五里河体育场; traditional Chinese: 五里河體育場; pinyin: Wǔlǐhé Tǐyùchǎng) was a multi-purpose stadium in Shenyang, China.

The stadium had a capacity of 65,000 people and was built in 1989. It was used mostly for football matches. The opening match took place in August 1989 when Santos beat Liaoning 1–0.

It was the home stadium of the Shenyang Ginde football team. It was the site of the Chinese National Team's clinching a spot for the 2002 FIFA World Cup Finals when they defeated Oman 1–0 to claim a spot for the finals in South Korea (qualifying for the tournament for the first and, to date, only time in history). It was demolished on 12 February 2007 after 18 years of usage to make way for a shopping mall. A new Shenyang Olympic Sports Center Stadium was constructed in 2007 to host some of the football matches for the Beijing Olympics in 2008 and replace this stadium.

== See also ==
- Shenyang Olympic Sports Center Stadium
