= 1999 FIFA Confederations Cup squads =

Below are the rosters for the 1999 FIFA Confederations Cup tournament in Mexico.

== Group A ==
=== Bolivia ===
Head coach: (Argentina) Héctor Veira

No.	Pos.	Player	Date of birth (age)	Caps	Club
1	GK	José Fernández	24 January 1971 (aged 28)		(Bolivia) Club Blooming
2	DF	Juan Manuel Peña	17 January 1973 (aged 26)		(Spain) Real Valladolid
3	DF	Ronald Arana	18 January 1977 (aged 22)		(Bolivia) The Strongest
4	MF	Lorgio Álvarez	29 June 1978 (aged 21)		(Bolivia) Club Blooming
5	DF	Óscar Sánchez	16 July 1971 (aged 28)		(Argentina) Club Atlético Independiente
6	MF	Luis Cristaldo	31 August 1969 (aged 29)		(Spain) Sporting Gijón
7	FW	Limberg Gutiérrez	19 November 1977 (aged 21)		(Bolivia) Club Blooming
8	MF	Rubén Tufiño	9 January 1970 (aged 29)		(Bolivia) Club Blooming
9	FW	Jaime Moreno	19 January 1974 (aged 25)		(United States) D.C. United
10	MF	Marco Etcheverry	26 September 1970 (aged 28)		(United States) D.C. United
11	FW	Gonzalo Galindo	20 October 1974 (aged 24)		(Bolivia) Jorge Wilstermann
12	GK	Sergio Galarza	25 August 1975 (aged 23)		(Bolivia) Real Santa Cruz
13	FW	Joaquín Botero	10 December 1977 (aged 21)		(Bolivia) Club Bolívar
14	MF	Erwin Sánchez (c)	19 October 1969 (aged 29)		(Portugal) Boavista
15	FW	Martín Menacho	7 August 1973 (aged 25)		(Bolivia) Club Blooming
16	MF	Vladimir Soria	15 July 1964 (aged 35)		(Bolivia) Club Bolívar
17	MF	Raúl Justiniano	29 September 1977 (aged 21)		(Bolivia) Club Blooming
18	DF	Gustavo Quinteros	15 February 1965 (aged 34)		(Argentina) Argentinos Juniors
19	DF	Iván Castillo	11 July 1970 (aged 29)		(Argentina) Gimnasia de Jujuy
20	DF	Renny Ribera	30 January 1974 (aged 25)		(Bolivia) Club Blooming

=== Egypt ===
Head coach: Mahmoud El-Gohary

No.	Pos.	Player	Date of birth (age)	Caps	Club
1	GK	Nader El-Sayed	31 December 1972 (aged 26)		(Belgium) Club Brugge
2	DF	Ibrahim Hassan	10 August 1966 (aged 32)		(Egypt) Al Ahly
3	DF	Mohamed Emara	10 June 1974 (aged 25)		(Germany) Hansa Rostock
4	MF	Hany Ramzy	10 March 1969 (aged 30)		(Germany) 1. FC Kaiserslautern
5	DF	Samir Kamouna	2 April 1972 (aged 27)		(Germany) 1. FC Kaiserslautern
6	DF	Medhat Abdel-Hady	12 July 1974 (aged 25)		(Turkey) Kocaelispor
7	DF	Mohamed Youssef	9 October 1970 (aged 28)		(Egypt) Al Ahly
8	MF	Yasser Radwan	22 April 1972 (aged 27)		(Germany) Hansa Rostock
9	FW	Hossam Hassan (c)	10 August 1966 (aged 32)		(Egypt) Al Ahly
10	FW	Abdel Sattar Sabry	19 June 1974 (aged 25)		(Greece) PAOK
11	MF	Yasser Rayyan	26 March 1970 (aged 29)		(Egypt) Al Ahly
12	MF	Hady Khashaba	19 December 1972 (aged 26)		(Egypt) Al Ahly
13	FW	Abdul-Hamid Bassiouny	15 December 1971 (aged 27)		(Egypt) Zamalek
14	FW	Hazem Emam	10 May 1975 (aged 24)		(Netherlands) De Graafschap
15	DF	Abdel-Zaher El-Saqqa	30 January 1974 (aged 25)		(Egypt) El Mansoura
16	GK	Essam El-Hadary	15 January 1973 (aged 26)		(Egypt) Al Ahly
17	MF	Ahmed Hassan	2 May 1975 (aged 24)		(Turkey) Kocaelispor
18	MF	Hossam Abdel-Moneim	12 February 1975 (aged 24)		(Egypt) Zamalek
19	FW	Khaled El-Amin	6 October 1976 (aged 22)		(Egypt) Ismaily
20	MF	Walid Salah El-Din	27 October 1971 (aged 27)		(Egypt) Al Ahly

=== Mexico ===
Head coach: Manuel Lapuente

No.	Pos.	Player	Date of birth (age)	Caps	Club
1	GK	Jorge Campos	15 October 1966 (aged 32)		(Mexico) UNAM
2	DF	Claudio Suárez	17 December 1968 (aged 30)		(Mexico) Guadalajara
3	DF	Joel Sánchez	17 August 1974 (aged 24)		(Mexico) América
4	DF	Rafael Márquez	13 February 1979 (aged 20)		(Mexico) Atlas
5	MF	Gerardo Torrado	30 April 1979 (aged 20)		(Mexico) UNAM
6	MF	Germán Villa	2 April 1973 (aged 26)		(Mexico) Necaxa
7	MF	Ramón Ramírez	5 December 1969 (aged 29)		(Mexico) UANL
8	MF	Alberto García Aspe (c)	11 May 1967 (aged 32)		(Mexico) América
9	FW	José Manuel Abundis	11 June 1973 (aged 26)		(Mexico) Toluca
10	FW	Cuauhtémoc Blanco	17 January 1973 (aged 26)		(Mexico) América
11	FW	Daniel Osorno	16 March 1979 (aged 20)		(Mexico) Atlas
12	GK	Óscar Pérez	1 February 1973 (aged 26)		(Mexico) Cruz Azul
13	MF	Pável Pardo	26 July 1976 (aged 22)		(Mexico) América
14	DF	Isaac Terrazas	23 June 1973 (aged 26)		(Mexico) América
15	FW	Luis Hernández	22 December 1968 (aged 30)		(Mexico) UANL
16	MF	Jesús Arellano	8 May 1973 (aged 26)		(Mexico) Guadalajara
17	FW	Francisco Palencia	28 April 1973 (aged 26)		(Mexico) Cruz Azul
18	DF	Salvador Carmona	22 August 1975 (aged 23)		(Mexico) Toluca
19	MF	Miguel Zepeda	25 May 1976 (aged 23)		(Mexico) Atlas
20	MF	Rafael García	14 August 1974 (aged 24)		(Mexico) Toluca

=== Saudi Arabia ===
Head coach: (Czech Republic) Milan Máčala

No.	Pos.	Player	Date of birth (age)	Caps	Club
1	GK	Mohamed Al-Deayea (c)	2 August 1972 (aged 26)		(Saudi Arabia) Al-Tai
2	DF	Mohammed Al-Jahani	28 September 1974 (aged 24)		(Saudi Arabia) Al Ahli
3	DF	Mohammed Al-Khilaiwi	24 May 1971 (aged 28)		(Saudi Arabia) Al-Ittihad
4	DF	Abdullah Zubromawi	15 November 1973 (aged 25)		(Saudi Arabia) Al Ahli
5	DF	Saleh Al-Dawod	24 September 1968 (aged 30)		(Saudi Arabia) Al Shabab
6	MF	Ibrahim Al-Harbi	10 July 1975 (aged 24)		(Saudi Arabia) Al Nassr
7	MF	Ibrahim Al-Shahrani	21 July 1974 (aged 25)		(Saudi Arabia) Al Ahli
8	MF	Mohammed Noor	26 February 1978 (aged 21)		(Saudi Arabia) Al-Ittihad
9	MF	Marzouk Al-Otaibi	7 November 1975 (aged 23)		(Saudi Arabia) Al Shabab
10	MF	Khaled Gahwji	7 July 1975 (aged 24)		(Saudi Arabia) Al Ahli
11	GK	Tisir Al-Antaif	16 February 1974 (aged 25)		(Saudi Arabia) Al-Ittihad
12	GK	Hussein Al-Sadiq	15 October 1973 (aged 25)		(Saudi Arabia) Al-Ittihad
13	DF	Hussein Abdulghani	21 January 1977 (aged 22)		(Saudi Arabia) Al Ahli
14	FW	Abdullah Bin Shehan	10 August 1976 (aged 22)		(Saudi Arabia) Al Shabab
15	MF	Fahad Al-Subaie	15 November 1979 (aged 19)		(Saudi Arabia) Al Shabab
16	DF	Ibrahim Al-Shokia	16 February 1975 (aged 24)		(Saudi Arabia) Al-Nassr
17	DF	Abdullah Al-Waked	29 September 1975 (aged 23)		(Saudi Arabia) Al Shabab
18	FW	Nawaf Al-Temyat	28 June 1976 (aged 23)		(Saudi Arabia) Al-Hilal
19	FW	Hamzah Idris	8 October 1972 (aged 26)		(Saudi Arabia) Al-Ittihad
20	DF	Mohsin al-Harthi	17 July 1976 (aged 23)		(Saudi Arabia) Al Nassr

== Group B ==
=== Brazil ===
Head coach: Vanderlei Luxemburgo

No.	Pos.	Player	Date of birth (age)	Caps	Club
1	GK	Dida	7 October 1973 (aged 25)		(Brazil) Corinthians
2	DF	Evanílson	12 September 1975 (aged 23)		(Brazil) Cruzeiro
3	DF	Odvan	26 March 1974 (aged 25)		(Brazil) Vasco da Gama
4	DF	João Carlos	10 September 1972 (aged 26)		(Brazil) Corinthians
5	MF	Flávio Conceição	13 June 1974 (aged 25)		(Spain) Deportivo La Coruña
6	DF	Serginho	27 June 1971 (aged 28)		(Brazil) São Paulo
7	FW	Ronaldinho	21 March 1980 (aged 19)		(Brazil) Grêmio
8	MF	Emerson (c)	4 April 1976 (aged 23)		(Germany) Bayer Leverkusen
9	FW	Christian	23 April 1975 (aged 24)		(Brazil) Internacional
10	MF	Alex	14 September 1977 (aged 21)		(Brazil) Palmeiras
11	MF	Zé Roberto	6 July 1974 (aged 25)		(Germany) Bayer Leverkusen
12	GK	Marcos	4 August 1973 (aged 25)		(Brazil) Palmeiras
13	DF	César Belli	16 November 1975 (aged 23)		(Brazil) Portuguesa
14	DF	Luiz Alberto	1 December 1977 (aged 21)		(Brazil) Flamengo
15	MF	Marcos Paulo	11 May 1977 (aged 22)		(Brazil) Cruzeiro
16	DF	Athirson	16 January 1977 (aged 22)		(Brazil) Flamengo
17	MF	Beto	7 January 1975 (aged 24)		(Brazil) Flamengo
18	FW	Roni	28 April 1977 (aged 22)		(Brazil) Fluminense
19	FW	Warley	13 February 1978 (aged 21)		(Brazil) São Paulo
20	MF	Vampeta	13 March 1974 (aged 25)		(Brazil) Corinthians

=== Germany ===
Head coach: Erich Ribbeck

No.	Pos.	Player	Date of birth (age)	Caps	Club
1	GK	Jens Lehmann	10 November 1969 (aged 29)		(Germany) Borussia Dortmund
2	DF	Christian Wörns	10 May 1972 (aged 27)		(France) Paris Saint-Germain
3	DF	Jörg Heinrich	6 December 1969 (aged 29)		(Italy) Fiorentina
4	DF	Thomas Linke	26 December 1969 (aged 29)		(Germany) Bayern Munich
5	DF	Mustafa Doğan	1 January 1976 (aged 23)		(Turkey) Fenerbahçe
6	DF	Ronald Maul	13 February 1973 (aged 26)		(Germany) Arminia Bielefeld
7	MF	Mehmet Scholl	16 October 1970 (aged 28)		(Germany) Bayern Munich
8	MF	Dariusz Wosz	8 June 1969 (aged 30)		(Germany) VfL Bochum
9	FW	Olaf Marschall	19 March 1966 (aged 33)		(Germany) 1. FC Kaiserslautern
10	MF	Lothar Matthäus (c)	21 March 1961 (aged 38)		(Germany) Bayern Munich
11	FW	Michael Preetz	17 August 1967 (aged 31)		(Germany) Hertha BSC
12	GK	Robert Enke	24 August 1977 (aged 21)		(Germany) Borussia Mönchengladbach
13	FW	Oliver Neuville	1 May 1973 (aged 26)		(Germany) Hansa Rostock
14	DF	Frank Baumann	29 October 1975 (aged 23)		(Germany) 1. FC Nürnberg
15	MF	Michael Ballack	26 September 1976 (aged 22)		(Germany) 1. FC Kaiserslautern
16	MF	Bernd Schneider	17 November 1973 (aged 25)		(Germany) Eintracht Frankfurt
17	DF	Heiko Gerber	11 July 1972 (aged 27)		(Germany) 1. FC Nürnberg
18	MF	Lars Ricken	10 July 1976 (aged 23)		(Germany) Borussia Dortmund
19	MF	Horst Heldt	9 December 1969 (aged 29)		(Germany) 1860 Munich
20	FW	Paulo Rink	21 February 1973 (aged 26)		(Germany) Bayer Leverkusen

=== New Zealand ===
Head coach: Ken Dugdale

No.	Pos.	Player	Date of birth (age)	Caps	Club
1	GK	Jason Batty	23 March 1971 (aged 28)	30	(Singapore) Geylang United
2	DF	Chris Zoricich (c)	3 May 1969 (aged 30)	33	(Australia) Brisbane Strikers
3	DF	Sean Douglas	3 May 1972 (aged 27)	10	(Australia) Carlton
4	DF	Che Bunce	29 August 1975 (aged 23)	11	(Iceland) Breiðablik
5	DF	Jonathan Perry	22 November 1976 (aged 22)	10	(New Zealand) Metro
6	DF	Gavin Wilkinson	5 November 1973 (aged 25)	24	(Australia) Perth Glory
7	MF	Mark Burton	18 May 1974 (aged 25)	12	(Germany) BSV Kickers Emden
8	MF	Aaran Lines	27 December 1976 (aged 22)	9	(Germany) VfL Osnabrück
9	FW	Paul Urlovic	21 November 1978 (aged 20)	8	(New Zealand) Central United
10	MF	Chris Jackson	18 July 1970 (aged 29)	33	(New Zealand) Napier City Rovers
11	MF	Heremaia Ngata	24 August 1971 (aged 27)	18	(New Zealand) North Shore United
12	MF	Mark Atkinson	16 February 1970 (aged 29)	20	(Australia) Carlton
13	DF	Christian Bouckenooghe	7 February 1977 (aged 22)	11	(Belgium) Roeselare
14	DF	Ryan Nelsen	18 October 1977 (aged 21)	6	(United States) Greensboro College
15	MF	Ivan Vicelich	3 September 1976 (aged 22)	20	(New Zealand) Central United
16	FW	Vaughan Coveny	13 December 1971 (aged 27)	40	(Australia) Southern Melbourne
17	FW	Mark Elrick	7 April 1967 (aged 32)	25	(New Zealand) Central United
18	DF	Scott Smith	6 March 1975 (aged 24)	9	(England) Woking
19	GK	Michael Utting	26 May 1970 (aged 29)	7	(South Africa) Supersport United
20	GK	Ross Nicholson	8 August 1975 (aged 23)	2	(New Zealand) Central United

=== United States ===
Head coach: Bruce Arena

No.	Pos.	Player	Date of birth (age)	Caps	Club
1	GK	Brad Friedel	18 May 1971 (aged 28)		(England) Liverpool
2	DF	Frankie Hejduk	5 August 1974 (aged 24)		(Germany) Bayer Leverkusen
3	DF	Gregg Berhalter	1 August 1973 (aged 25)		(Netherlands) Cambuur
4	DF	Robin Fraser	17 December 1966 (aged 32)		(United States) LA Galaxy
5	DF	C. J. Brown	15 June 1975 (aged 24)		(United States) Chicago Fire
6	MF	John Harkes	8 March 1967 (aged 32)		(United States) New England Revolution
7	MF	Eddie Lewis	17 May 1974 (aged 25)		(United States) San Jose Clash
8	FW	Earnie Stewart	28 March 1969 (aged 30)		(Netherlands) NAC Breda
9	FW	Joe-Max Moore	23 February 1971 (aged 28)		(United States) New England Revolution
10	FW	Jovan Kirovski	18 March 1976 (aged 23)		(Germany) Borussia Dortmund
11	MF	Paul Bravo	19 June 1968 (aged 31)		(United States) Colorado Rapids
12	DF	Jeff Agoos	2 May 1968 (aged 31)		(United States) D.C. United
13	FW	Cobi Jones	16 June 1970 (aged 29)		(United States) LA Galaxy
14	DF	Matt McKeon	24 September 1974 (aged 24)		(United States) Colorado Rapids
15	MF	Richie Williams	3 June 1970 (aged 29)		(United States) D.C. United
16	DF	Carlos Llamosa	30 June 1969 (aged 30)		(United States) D.C. United
17	DF	Marcelo Balboa	8 August 1967 (aged 31)		(United States) Colorado Rapids
18	GK	Kasey Keller (c)	29 November 1969 (aged 29)		(Spain) Rayo Vallecano
19	MF	Ben Olsen	3 May 1977 (aged 22)		(United States) D.C. United
20	FW	Brian McBride	19 June 1972 (aged 27)		(United States) Columbus Crew
