= 1999 FIFA Confederations Cup Group A =

Football tournament group stage

Group A of the 1999 FIFA Confederations Cup took place from 25 to 29 July 1999 in Mexico City's Estadio Azteca. The group consisted of Bolivia, Egypt, host nation Mexico, and Saudi Arabia.

== Teams ==
Draw position	Team	Pot	Confederation	Method of qualification	Date of qualification	Finals appearance	Last appearance	Previous best performance	FIFA Rankings	
Draw position	Team	Pot	Confederation	Method of qualification	Date of qualification	Finals appearance	Last appearance	Previous best performance	September 1998 (Note: The rankings of September 1998 were used for seeding for the final draw.)	July 1999
A1	Mexico	–	CONCACAF	Hosts	–	3rd	1997	Third place (1995)	10	13
A2	Egypt	–	CAF	1998 African Cup of Nations winners	28 February 1998	1st	–	–	19	33
A3	Bolivia	–	CONMEBOL	1997 Copa América runners-up	23 October 1998	1st	–	–	57	72
A4	Saudi Arabia	–	AFC	1996 AFC Asian Cup winners	21 December 1996	4th	1997	Runners-up (1991)	32	48

== Standings ==
Pos	Team	Pld	W	D	L	GF	GA	GD	Pts	Qualification
1	Mexico (H)	3	2	1	0	8	3	+5	7	Advance to knockout stage
2	Saudi Arabia	3	1	1	1	6	6	0	4	Advance to knockout stage
3	Bolivia	3	0	2	1	2	3	−1	2	
4	Egypt	3	0	2	1	5	9	−4	2	

Source: FIFA
(H) Hosts

In the semi-finals:

- The winners of Group A, Mexico, advanced to play the runners-up of Group B, United States.
- The runners-up of Group A, Saudi Arabia, advanced to play the winners of Group B, Brazil.

== Results ==
=== Bolivia vs Egypt ===
25 July 1999
12:00

Bolivia	2–2	Egypt
Gutiérrez 21'; Ribera 40'	Report	Sabry 8'; Radwan 63'

Estadio Azteca, Mexico City
Attendance: 85,000
Referee: Anders Frisk (Sweden)

Bolivia
Egypt

GK	1	José Fernández
DF	2	Juan Manuel Peña
DF	3	Ronald Arana
DF	19	Iván Castillo
DF	20	Renny Ribera
MF	8	Rubén Tufiño
MF	14	Erwin Sánchez
MF	17	Raúl Justiniano
FW	7	Limberg Gutiérrez	(substituted off) 71'
FW	11	Gonzalo Galindo	(substituted off) 60'
FW	13	Joaquín Botero
Substitutions:
MF	16	Vladimir Soria	(substituted on) 60'
MF	10	Marco Etcheverry	(substituted on) 71'
Manager:
(Argentina) Héctor Veira

GK	16	Essam El-Hadary
DF	2	Ibrahim Hassan
DF	6	Medhat Abdel-Hady
DF	7	Mohamed Youssef
DF	15	Abdel-Zaher El-Saqqa
MF	4	Hany Ramzy
MF	8	Yasser Radwan
MF	17	Ahmed Hassan
FW	9	Hossam Hassan	(substituted off) 61'
FW	10	Abdel Sattar Sabry	(substituted off) 75'
FW	14	Hazem Emam	(substituted off) 84'
Substitutions:
FW	13	Abdul-Hamid Bassiouny	(substituted on) 61'
FW	19	Khaled Bebo	(substituted on) 75'
MF	12	Hady Khashaba	(substituted on) 84'
Manager:
Mahmoud El-Gohary

=== Mexico vs Saudi Arabia ===
25 July 1999
14:30

Mexico	5–1	Saudi Arabia
Blanco 12', 19', 68', 77'; Abundis 21'	Report	Al-Temyat 62' (pen.)

Estadio Azteca, Mexico City
Attendance: 85,000
Referee: Óscar Ruiz (Colombia)

Mexico
Saudi Arabia

GK	1	Jorge Campos
DF	2	Claudio Suárez
DF	4	Rafael Márquez
DF	18	Salvador Carmona
MF	6	Germán Villa
MF	8	Alberto García Aspe	(substituted off) 65'
MF	13	Pável Pardo
MF	19	Miguel Zepeda	(substituted off) 46'
FW	9	José Manuel Abundis
FW	10	Cuauhtémoc Blanco
FW	17	Francisco Palencia	(substituted off) 80'
Substitutions:
MF	16	Jesús Arellano	(substituted on) 46'
MF	20	Rafael García	(substituted on) 65'
DF	14	Isaac Terrazas	(substituted on) 80'
Manager:
Manuel Lapuente

GK	1	Mohamed Al-Deayea
DF	2	Mohammed Al-Jahani
DF	3	Mohammed Al-Khilaiwi
DF	5	Saleh Al-Dawod
DF	13	Hussein Abdulghani
DF	20	Mohsin Harthi
MF	6	Ibrahim Al-Harbi
MF	7	Ibrahim Al-Shahrani	(substituted off) 84'
MF	15	Fahad Al-Subaie
FW	18	Nawaf Al-Temyat	(substituted off) 84'
FW	19	Hamzah Idris
Substitutions:
FW	14	Abdullah Bin Shehan	(substituted on) 84'
DF	17	Abdullah Al-Waked	(substituted on) 84'
Manager:
(Czech Republic) Milan Máčala

=== Saudi Arabia vs Bolivia ===
27 July 1999
18:00

Saudi Arabia	0–0	Bolivia
	Report

Estadio Azteca, Mexico City
Attendance: 65,000
Referee: Brian Hall (United States)

Saudi Arabia
Bolivia

GK	1	Mohamed Al-Deayea
DF	2	Mohammed Al-Jahani		(substituted off) 66'
DF	3	Mohammed Al-Khilaiwi
DF	5	Saleh Al-Dawod	(yellow card) 57'
DF	13	Hussein Abdulghani
DF	20	Mohsin Harthi
MF	6	Ibrahim Al-Harbi
MF	7	Ibrahim Al-Shahrani	(yellow card) 71'
MF	15	Fahad Al-Subaie	(yellow card) 52'
FW	18	Nawaf Al-Temyat		(substituted off) 79'
FW	19	Hamzah Idris		(substituted off) 46'
Substitutions:
MF	9	Marzouk Al-Otaibi		(substituted on) 46'
DF	17	Abdullah Al-Waked		(substituted on) 66'
FW	14	Abdullah Bin Shehan		(substituted on) 79'
Manager:
(Czech Republic) Milan Máčala

GK	1	José Fernández
DF	3	Ronald Arana
DF	5	Óscar Sánchez
DF	20	Renny Ribera
MF	4	Lorgio Álvarez
MF	8	Rubén Tufiño	(yellow card) 22'
MF	10	Marco Etcheverry	(yellow card) 19'	(substituted off) 53'
MF	14	Erwin Sánchez		(substituted off) 46'
MF	15	Martín Menacho
MF	16	Vladimir Soria
FW	9	Jaime Moreno		(substituted off) 73'
Substitutions:
FW	7	Limberg Gutiérrez	(yellow card) 70'	(substituted on) 46'
FW	11	Gonzalo Galindo		(substituted on) 53'
FW	13	Joaquín Botero		(substituted on) 73'
Manager:
(Argentina) Héctor Veira

=== Mexico vs Egypt ===
27 July 1999
20:30

Mexico	2–2	Egypt
Pardo 15'; Abundis 26'	Report	A. Hassan 79'; S. Ibrahim 85'

Estadio Azteca, Mexico City
Attendance: 65,000
Referee: Kim Young-joo (Korea Republic)

Mexico
Egypt

GK	1	Jorge Campos
DF	2	Claudio Suárez
DF	4	Rafael Márquez
DF	18	Salvador Carmona
MF	6	Germán Villa
MF	7	Ramón Ramírez
MF	13	Pável Pardo
MF	20	Rafael García
FW	9	José Manuel Abundis		(substituted off) 55'
FW	10	Cuauhtémoc Blanco
FW	17	Francisco Palencia
Substitutions:
MF	8	Alberto García Aspe	(yellow card) 77'	(substituted on) 55'
Manager:
Manuel Lapuente

GK	16	Essam El-Hadary
DF	2	Ibrahim Hassan
DF	5	Samir Kamouna
DF	6	Medhat Abdel-Hady
DF	7	Mohamed Youssef
DF	15	Abdel-Zaher El-Saqqa
MF	4	Hany Ramzy
MF	8	Yasser Radwan	(yellow card) 30' (yellow-red card) 64'
MF	17	Ahmed Hassan	(yellow card) 89'
FW	10	Abdel Sattar Sabry
FW	14	Hazem Emam
Manager:
Mahmoud El-Gohary

=== Egypt vs Saudi Arabia ===
29 July 1999
18:00

Egypt	1–5	Saudi Arabia
S. Ibrahim 70' (pen.)	Report	Al-Otaibi 8', 34', 78', 85'; Al-Shahrani 64'

Estadio Azteca, Mexico City
Attendance: 15,000
Referee: Ubaldo Aquino (Paraguay)

Egypt
Saudi Arabia

GK	16	Essam El-Hadary
DF	2	Ibrahim Hassan
DF	5	Samir Kamouna	(red card) 80'
DF	6	Medhat Abdel-Hady
DF	7	Mohamed Youssef
DF	15	Abdel-Zaher El-Saqqa		(substituted off) 43'
MF	4	Hany Ramzy
MF	11	Yasser Rayyan		(substituted off) 65'
MF	17	Ahmed Hassan		(substituted off) 55'
FW	10	Abdel Sattar Sabry	(red card) 28'
FW	14	Hazem Emam	(yellow card) 36' (yellow-red card) 37'
Substitutions:
FW	13	Abdul-Hamid Bassiouny		(substituted on) 43'
FW	19	Khaled El-Amin		(substituted on) 55'
MF	20	Walid Salah El-Din		(substituted on) 65'
Manager:
Mahmoud El-Gohary

GK	1	Mohamed Al-Deayea
DF	2	Mohammed Al-Jahani		(substituted off) 83'
DF	4	Abdullah Zubromawi
DF	5	Saleh Al-Dawod
DF	13	Hussein Abdulghani
DF	20	Mohsin Harthi
MF	6	Ibrahim Al-Harbi		(substituted off) 65'
MF	7	Ibrahim Al-Shahrani	(yellow card) 90'
MF	9	Marzouk Al-Otaibi
MF	15	Fahad Al-Subaie
FW	18	Nawaf Al-Temyat	(yellow card) 12'	(substituted off) 46'
Substitutions:
FW	14	Abdullah Bin Shehan		(substituted on) 46'
DF	17	Abdullah Al-Waked		(substituted on) 65'
MF	10	Khaled Gahwji		(substituted on) 83'
Manager:
(Czech Republic) Milan Máčala

=== Bolivia vs Mexico ===
29 July 1999
20:30

Bolivia	0–1	Mexico
	Report	Palencia 52'

Estadio Azteca, Mexico City
Attendance: 55,000
Referee: Óscar Ruiz (Colombia)

Bolivia
Mexico

GK	1	José Fernández
DF	3	Ronald Arana
DF	5	Óscar Sánchez
DF	19	Iván Castillo
DF	20	Renny Ribera
MF	6	Luis Cristaldo
MF	8	Rubén Tufiño	(yellow card) 80'
MF	14	Erwin Sánchez	(yellow card) 60'
MF	15	Martín Menacho	(yellow card) 41'	(substituted off) 66'
MF	16	Vladimir Soria		(substituted off) 46'
FW	9	Jaime Moreno		(substituted off) 78'
Substitutions:
FW	7	Limberg Gutiérrez		(substituted on) 46'
MF	10	Marco Etcheverry		(substituted on) 66'
FW	13	Joaquín Botero		(substituted on) 78'
Manager:
(Argentina) Héctor Veira

GK	1	Jorge Campos
DF	2	Claudio Suárez
DF	4	Rafael Márquez
DF	18	Salvador Carmona
MF	6	Germán Villa	(yellow card) 58'	(substituted off) 65'
MF	7	Ramón Ramírez
MF	13	Pável Pardo
MF	19	Miguel Zepeda	(yellow card) 68'
FW	10	Cuauhtémoc Blanco
FW	15	Luis Hernández		(substituted off) 22'
FW	17	Francisco Palencia
Substitutions:
FW	9	José Manuel Abundis	(yellow card) 80'	(substituted on) 22'
FW	16	Jesús Arellano		(substituted on) 65'
Manager:
Manuel Lapuente
