= 1999 FIFA Confederations Cup Group B =

Football tournament group stage

Group B of the 1999 FIFA Confederations Cup took place from 24 to 30 July 1999 in Guadalajara's Estadio Jalisco. The group consisted of defending champion Brazil, Germany, New Zealand, and the United States.

== Teams ==
Draw position	Team	Pot	Confederation	Method of qualification	Date of qualification	Finals appearance	Last appearance	Previous best performance	FIFA Rankings	
Draw position	Team	Pot	Confederation	Method of qualification	Date of qualification	Finals appearance	Last appearance	Previous best performance	September 1998 (Note: The rankings of September 1998 were used for seeding for the final draw.)	July 1999
B1	Brazil		CONMEBOL	1998 FIFA World Cup runners-up						
B2	Germany		UEFA	UEFA Euro 1996 winners						
B3	United States		CONCACAF	1998 CONCACAF Gold Cup runners-up						
B4	New Zealand		OFC	1998 OFC Nations Cup winners						

== Standings ==
Pos	Team	Pld	W	D	L	GF	GA	GD	Pts	Qualification
1	Brazil	3	3	0	0	7	0	+7	9	Advance to knockout stage
2	United States	3	2	0	1	4	2	+2	6	Advance to knockout stage
3	Germany	3	1	0	2	2	6	−4	3	
4	New Zealand	3	0	0	3	1	6	−5	0	

Source: FIFA

In the semi-finals:

- The winners of Group B, Brazil, advanced to play the runners-up of Group A, Saudi Arabia.
- The runners-up of Group B, United States, advanced to play the winners of Group A, Mexico.

== Results ==
=== Brazil vs Germany ===
24 July 1999
12:00

Brazil	4–0	Germany
Zé Roberto 62'; Ronaldinho 72'; Alex 86', 87'	Report

Estadio Jalisco, Guadalajara
Attendance: 60,000
Referee: Gilberto Alcalá (Mexico)

Brazil
Germany

GK	1	Dida
RB	2	Evanílson
CB	3	Odvan
CB	4	João Carlos
LB	6	Serginho
DM	8	Emerson (c)	(yellow card) 12'
RM	20	Vampeta	(yellow card) 17'
LM	5	Flávio Conceição		(substituted off) 62'
AM	11	Zé Roberto		(substituted off) 82'
CF	9	Christian		(substituted off) 62'
CF	7	Ronaldinho
Substitutions:
MF	10	Alex		(substituted on) 62'
FW	19	Warley		(substituted on) 62'
MF	17	Beto		(substituted on) 82'
Manager:
Vanderlei Luxemburgo

GK	1	Jens Lehmann
RB	15	Michael Ballack
CB	2	Christian Wörns
CB	4	Thomas Linke
LB	3	Jörg Heinrich		(substituted off) 73'
DM	10	Lothar Matthäus (c)
RM	18	Lars Ricken
CM	8	Dariusz Wosz
LM	7	Mehmet Scholl	(yellow card) 9'
SS	11	Michael Preetz		(substituted off) 70'
CF	13	Oliver Neuville		(substituted off) 78'
Substitutions:
FW	9	Olaf Marschall		(substituted on) 70'
DF	6	Ronald Maul		(substituted on) 73'
DF	17	Heiko Gerber		(substituted on) 78'
Manager:
Erich Ribbeck

=== New Zealand vs United States ===
24 July 1999
14:30

New Zealand	1–2	United States
Zoricich 90+3'	Report	McBride 25'; Kirovski 58'

Estadio Jalisco, Guadalajara
Attendance: 60,000
Referee: Ubaldo Aquino (Paraguay)

New Zealand
United States

GK	1	Jason Batty
CB	2	Chris Zoricich (c)
CB	15	Ivan Vicelich
CB	6	Gavin Wilkinson
RM	13	Christian Bouckenooghe
CM	12	Mark Atkinson		(substituted off) 57'
CM	8	Aaran Lines
LM	3	Sean Douglas		(substituted off) 73'
AM	10	Chris Jackson
AM	7	Mark Burton
CF	16	Vaughan Coveny	(yellow card) 32'	(substituted off) 63'
Substitutions:
DF	14	Ryan Nelsen		(substituted on) 57'
FW	17	Mark Elrick		(substituted on) 63'
DF	18	Scott Smith		(substituted on) 73'
Manager:
Ken Dugdale

GK	18	Kasey Keller (c)
RB	13	Cobi Jones	(substituted off) 82'
CB	4	Robin Fraser
CB	16	Carlos Llamosa
LB	12	Jeff Agoos
DM	15	Richie Williams
RM	6	John Harkes
LM	7	Eddie Lewis	(substituted off) 77'
AM	8	Earnie Stewart	(substituted off) 77'
CF	10	Jovan Kirovski
CF	20	Brian McBride
Substitutions:
DF	2	Frankie Hejduk	(substituted on) 77'
MF	19	Ben Olsen	(substituted on) 77'
FW	9	Joe-Max Moore	(substituted on) 82'
Manager:
Bruce Arena

=== Germany vs New Zealand ===
28 July 1999
18:00

Germany	2–0	New Zealand
Preetz 6'; Matthäus 33'	Report

Estadio Jalisco, Guadalajara
Attendance: 42,000
Referee: Coffi Codjia (Benin)

Germany
New Zealand

GK	1	Jens Lehmann
RB	16	Bernd Schneider
CB	2	Christian Wörns
CB	4	Thomas Linke
LB	3	Jörg Heinrich
DM	10	Lothar Matthäus (c)	(yellow card) 47'	(substituted off) 70'
RM	11	Michael Preetz
CM	18	Lars Ricken
CM	7	Mehmet Scholl		(substituted off) 46'
LM	9	Olaf Marschall	(yellow card) 19'	(substituted off) 64'
CF	13	Oliver Neuville
Substitutions:
MF	8	Dariusz Wosz		(substituted on) 46'
FW	20	Paulo Rink		(substituted on) 64'
MF	15	Michael Ballack		(substituted on) 70'
Manager:
Erich Ribbeck

GK	1	Jason Batty
RB	2	Chris Zoricich (c)	(substituted off) 78'
CB	14	Ryan Nelsen
CB	15	Ivan Vicelich
LB	6	Gavin Wilkinson
RM	13	Christian Bouckenooghe
CM	12	Mark Atkinson
CM	8	Aaran Lines
LM	3	Sean Douglas
CF	10	Chris Jackson	(substituted off) 62'
CF	7	Mark Burton	(substituted off) 78'
Substitutions:
FW	16	Vaughan Coveny	(substituted on) 62'
DF	5	Jonathan Perry	(substituted on) 78'
FW	17	Mark Elrick	(substituted on) 78'
Manager:
Ken Dugdale

=== Brazil vs United States ===
28 July 1999
20:30

Brazil	1–0	United States
Ronaldinho 13'	Report

Estadio Jalisco, Guadalajara
Attendance: 54,000
Referee: Anders Frisk (Sweden)

Brazil
United States

GK	1	Dida
RB	2	Evanílson
CB	3	Odvan
CB	4	João Carlos
LB	6	Serginho
DM	8	Emerson (c)	(yellow card) 90+2'
RM	20	Vampeta
LM	5	Flávio Conceição		(substituted off) 78'
AM	11	Zé Roberto
CF	9	Christian		(substituted off) 46'
CF	7	Ronaldinho		(substituted off) 80'
Substitutions:
FW	19	Warley		(substituted on) 46'
MF	10	Alex		(substituted on) 78'
MF	17	Beto		(substituted on) 80'
Manager:
Vanderlei Luxemburgo

GK	18	Kasey Keller (c)
RB	2	Frankie Hejduk
CB	3	Gregg Berhalter	(yellow card) 6'
CB	16	Carlos Llamosa	(yellow card) 35'	(substituted off) 78'
LB	12	Jeff Agoos
DM	4	Robin Fraser	(yellow card) 61'
RM	6	John Harkes		(substituted off) 58'
LM	8	Earnie Stewart
AM	20	Brian McBride
CF	10	Jovan Kirovski
CF	13	Cobi Jones
Substitutions:
FW	9	Joe-Max Moore		(substituted on) 58'
MF	7	Eddie Lewis		(substituted on) 78'
Manager:
Bruce Arena

=== United States vs Germany ===
30 July 1999
18:00

United States	2–0	Germany
Olsen 23'; Moore 50'	Report

Estadio Jalisco, Guadalajara
Attendance: 53,000
Referee: Gilberto Alcalá (Mexico)

United States
Germany

GK	1	Brad Friedel (c)
RB	2	Frankie Hejduk	(yellow card) 39'
CB	17	Marcelo Balboa
CB	5	C. J. Brown
LB	12	Jeff Agoos	(yellow card) 47'
RM	19	Ben Olsen	(yellow card) 33'	(substituted off) 65'
CM	14	Matt McKeon
CM	15	Richie Williams
LM	7	Eddie Lewis
AM	11	Paul Bravo		(substituted off) 77'
CF	9	Joe-Max Moore		(substituted off) 82'
Substitutions:
FW	8	Earnie Stewart		(substituted on) 65'
FW	20	Brian McBride		(substituted on) 77'
FW	10	Jovan Kirovski		(substituted on) 82'
Manager:
Bruce Arena

GK	1	Jens Lehmann
RB	16	Bernd Schneider
CB	2	Christian Wörns	(yellow card) 75'
CB	4	Thomas Linke
LB	3	Jörg Heinrich		(substituted off) 41'
DM	10	Lothar Matthäus (c)	(yellow card) 81'
RM	11	Michael Preetz
CM	8	Dariusz Wosz
CM	19	Horst Heldt		(substituted off) 60'
LM	17	Heiko Gerber	(yellow card) 60'	(substituted off) 76'
CF	13	Oliver Neuville
Substitutions:
DF	5	Mustafa Doğan		(substituted on) 41'
FW	20	Paulo Rink	(yellow card) 90+2'	(substituted on) 60'
DF	6	Ronald Maul		(substituted on) 76'
Manager:
Erich Ribbeck

=== New Zealand vs Brazil ===
30 July 1999
20:30

New Zealand	0–2	Brazil
	Report	Marcos Paulo 45+2'; Ronaldinho 88'

Estadio Jalisco, Guadalajara
Attendance: 53,000
Referee: Kim Young-joo (Korea Republic)

New Zealand
Brazil

GK	1	Jason Batty
CB	2	Chris Zoricich (c)
CB	14	Ryan Nelsen	(yellow card) 81'
CB	4	Che Bunce		(substituted off) 82'
RM	13	Christian Bouckenooghe
CM	12	Mark Atkinson
CM	8	Aaran Lines
LM	3	Sean Douglas
RF	10	Chris Jackson	(yellow card) 27'	(substituted off) 85'
CF	11	Heremaia Ngata		(substituted off) 66'
LF	7	Mark Burton
Substitutions:
FW	16	Vaughan Coveny		(substituted on) 66'
MF	15	Ivan Vicelich		(substituted on) 82'
DF	5	Jonathan Perry		(substituted on) 85'
Manager:
Ken Dugdale

GK	1	Dida
RB	2	Evanílson
CB	13	César Belli
CB	14	Luiz Alberto
LB	16	Athirson
CM	15	Marcos Paulo	(substituted off) 56'
CM	5	Flávio Conceição (c)
RW	10	Alex
AM	19	Warley
LW	17	Beto
CF	9	Christian	(substituted off) 64'
Substitutions:
FW	18	Rôni	(substituted on) 56'
FW	7	Ronaldinho	(substituted on) 64'
Manager:
Vanderlei Luxemburgo
