= 1999 FIFA Confederations Cup knockout stage =

Football tournament knockout stage

The knockout stage of the 1999 FIFA Confederations Cup began on 1 August with the semi-final round, and concluded on 4 August 1999 with the final at the Estadio Azteca in Mexico City. The top two teams from each group advanced to the knockout stage to compete in a single-elimination style tournament. A third place match was included and played between the two losing teams of the semi-finals.

In the knockout stage (including the final), if a match was level at the end of 90 minutes, extra time of two periods (15 minutes each) would be played. If the score was still level after extra time, the match would be decided by a penalty shoot-out. Additionally, a golden goal rule was used, according to which if the goal is scored during the extra time, the game ends immediately and the scoring team becomes the winner.

All times CST (UTC−6).

== Qualified teams ==
Group	Winners	Runners-up
A	Mexico	Saudi Arabia
B	Brazil	United States

== Bracket ==
Semi-finals
1 August – Mexico City
Mexico (a.s.d.e.t.)	1
United States	0
1 August – Guadalajara
Brazil	8
Saudi Arabia	2

Final
4 August – Mexico City
Mexico	4
Brazil	3
Third place play-off
3 August – Guadalajara
United States	2
Saudi Arabia	0

== Semi-finals ==
=== Mexico vs United States ===
1 August 1999
12:00

Mexico	1–0 (a.e.t./g.g.)	United States
Blanco 97'	Report

Estadio Azteca, Mexico City
Attendance: 82,000
Referee: Kim Young-joo (Korea Republic)

Mexico	United States

GK	1	Jorge Campos
DF	2	Claudio Suárez
DF	4	Rafael Márquez
DF	18	Salvador Carmona
DF	14	Isaac Terrazas		(substituted off) 46'
MF	5	Gerardo Torrado		(substituted off) 58'
MF	6	Germán Villa
MF	7	Ramón Ramírez		(substituted off) 72'
MF	13	Pável Pardo
FW	9	José Manuel Abundis
FW	10	Cuauhtémoc Blanco	(yellow card) 57'
Substitutions:
FW	17	Francisco Palencia		(substituted on) 46'
MF	19	Miguel Zepeda		(substituted on) 58'
MF	16	Jesús Arellano		(substituted on) 72'
Manager:
Manuel Lapuente

GK	18	Kasey Keller
DF	2	Frankie Hejduk
DF	3	Gregg Berhalter
DF	4	Robin Fraser	(yellow card) 60'
DF	12	Jeff Agoos
MF	6	John Harkes	(yellow card) 41'
MF	8	Earnie Stewart
MF	15	Richie Williams
MF	20	Brian McBride		(substituted off) 78'
FW	10	Jovan Kirovski
FW	13	Cobi Jones
Substitutions:
MF	7	Eddie Lewis		(substituted on) 78'
Manager:
Bruce Arena

=== Brazil vs Saudi Arabia ===
1 August 1999
15:00

Brazil	8–2	Saudi Arabia
João Carlos 8'; Ronaldinho 11', 65', 90+2'; Zé Roberto 33'; Alex 36', 86'; Rôni 62'	Report	Al-Otaibi 22', 31'

Estadio Jalisco, Guadalajara
Attendance: 48,000
Referee: Óscar Ruiz (Colombia)

Brazil	Saudi Arabia

GK	1	Dida
DF	2	Evanílson		(substituted off) 16'
DF	3	Odvan
DF	4	João Carlos
DF	6	Serginho
MF	8	Emerson		(substituted off) 72'
MF	10	Alex
MF	11	Zé Roberto
MF	20	Vampeta	(yellow card) 37'
FW	7	Ronaldinho
FW	9	Christian		(substituted off) 46'
Substitutions:
MF	5	Flávio Conceição		(substituted on) 16'
FW	18	Rôni	(yellow card) 68'	(substituted on) 46'
MF	17	Beto		(substituted on) 72'
Manager:
Vanderlei Luxemburgo

GK	1	Mohamed Al-Deayea
DF	3	Mohammed Al-Khilaiwi
DF	4	Abdullah Zubromawi		(substituted off) 64'
DF	5	Saleh Al-Dawod
DF	13	Hussein Abdulghani
DF	20	Mohsin Harthi
MF	6	Ibrahim Al-Harbi
MF	7	Ibrahim Al-Shahrani	(yellow card) 39'	(substituted off) 43'
MF	9	Marzouk Al-Otaibi	(yellow card) 55'
MF	15	Fahad Al-Subaie	(yellow card) 81'
FW	18	Nawaf Al-Temyat
Substitutions:
DF	2	Mohammed Al-Jahani		(substituted on) 43'
MF	8	Mohammed Noor	(yellow card) 69'	(substituted on) 64'
Manager:
(Czech Republic) Milan Máčala

== Third place play-off ==
3 August 1999
21:00

United States	2–0	Saudi Arabia
Bravo 27'; McBride 78'	Report

Estadio Jalisco, Guadalajara
Attendance: 38,000
Referee: Ubaldo Aquino (Paraguay)

United States	Saudi Arabia

GK	1	Brad Friedel
DF	3	Gregg Berhalter		(substituted off) 74'
DF	5	C. J. Brown	(yellow card) 25'
DF	14	Matt McKeon	(yellow card) 55' (yellow-red card) 63'
DF	17	Marcelo Balboa
MF	2	Frankie Hejduk	(yellow card) 42'
MF	7	Eddie Lewis
MF	11	Paul Bravo	(yellow card) 8'	(substituted off) 55'
MF	19	Ben Olsen
FW	10	Jovan Kirovski		(substituted off) 67'
FW	20	Brian McBride
Substitutions:
MF	13	Cobi Jones		(substituted on) 55'
MF	15	Richie Williams		(substituted on) 67'
DF	4	Robin Fraser		(substituted on) 74'
Manager:
Bruce Arena

GK	1	Mohamed Al-Deayea
DF	2	Mohammed Al-Jahani		(substituted off) 58'
DF	3	Mohammed Al-Khilaiwi
DF	4	Abdullah Zubromawi
DF	13	Hussein Abdulghani
DF	20	Mohsin Harthi
MF	6	Ibrahim Al-Harbi		(substituted off) 58'
MF	9	Marzouk Al-Otaibi
MF	17	Abdullah Al-Waked
FW	14	Abdullah Bin Shehan	(yellow card) 24'
FW	18	Nawaf Al-Temyat	(yellow card) 25'
Substitutions:
MF	7	Ibrahim Al-Shahrani		(substituted on) 58'
MF	10	Khaled Gahwji		(substituted on) 68'
Manager:
(Czech Republic) Milan Máčala

== Final ==
4 August 1999
21:00

Mexico	4–3	Brazil
Zepeda 13', 51'; Abundis 28'; Blanco 62'	(Report)	Serginho 43' (pen.); Rôni 47'; Zé Roberto 63'

Estadio Azteca, Mexico City
Attendance: 110,000
Referee: Anders Frisk (Sweden)

Mexico	Brazil

GK	1	Jorge Campos
CB	18	Salvador Carmona
CB	4	Rafael Márquez	(yellow card) 21'
CB	2	Claudio Suárez (c)	(yellow card) 74'
CM	6	Germán Villa
CM	13	Pável Pardo
RM	19	Miguel Zepeda		(substituted off) 83'
LM	7	Ramon Ramírez
AM	10	Cuauhtémoc Blanco	(yellow card) 50'
CF	9	José Manuel Abundis	(yellow card) 11'
CF	17	Francisco Palencia		(substituted off) 70'
Substitutions:
DF	14	Isaac Terrazas		(substituted on) 70'
MF	16	Jesús Arellano		(substituted on) 83'
Manager:
(Mexico) Manuel Lapuente

GK	1	Dida
RB	8	Emerson (c)
CB	3	Odvan
CB	4	João Carlos	(yellow card) 46' (yellow-red card) 90+2'
LB	6	Serginho
CM	20	Vampeta
CM	5	Flávio Conceição
RW	10	Alex
AM	17	Beto		(substituted off) 46'
LW	11	Zé Roberto	(yellow card) 5'	(substituted off) 82'
CF	7	Ronaldinho
Substitutions:
FW	18	Rôni		(substituted on) 46'
FW	19	Warley		(substituted on) 82'
Manager:
(Brazil) Vanderlei Luxemburgo
