= List of FIFA Confederations Cup red cards =

This is a list of all occasions where a football player was sent off from a FIFA Confederations Cup match due to a foul or misconduct, either as a direct expulsion (red card) or as a second caution (yellow card) within the match.

The first player dismissed in the FIFA Confederations Cup was Brian Quinn of the United States, playing against Saudi Arabia in the 1992 tournament; the final player to be dismissed was Raúl Jiménez of Mexico, playing against Portugal in the 2017 tournament.

== Statistics ==
- Brian Quinn was the first player to be sent off in a Confederations Cup match, playing for the United States on 15 October 1992 against Saudi Arabia.
- Australia's Mark Viduka received the quickest red card, when he was sent off in the 24th minute of the 1997 final against Brazil.
- Four players were sent off in the final: Argentina's José Chamot in 1995, Australia's Viduka in 1997, Brazil's João Carlos in 1999, and Spain's Gerard Piqué in 2013.
- The most players sent off in one match was three, all for Egypt, in a 5–1 loss against Saudi Arabia on 29 July 1999.
- Egypt and the United States both had a record five players dismissed in total at the tournament.
- The tournament with the most red cards was the 1999 edition, with six in total.

== Full list ==
No.	Player	or	Time of card(s)	Representing	Final score	Opponent	Tournament	Round	Date
1	Brian Quinn	Red card	81'	United States	0–3	Saudi Arabia	1992, Saudi Arabia	Semi-finals	15 October 1992
2	Sam Abouo	Yellowred card	5', 51'	Ivory Coast	2–5	Argentina	1992, Saudi Arabia	Semi-finals	16 October 1992
3	José Chamot	Yellowred card	35', 88'	Argentina	0–2	Denmark	1995, Saudi Arabia	Final	13 January 1995
4	Abdullah Zubromawi	Yellowred card	24', 64'	Saudi Arabia	0–3	Brazil	1997, Saudi Arabia	Group stage	12 December 1997
5	Jiří Němec	Yellowred card	75', 82'	Czech Republic	2–2	South Africa	1997, Saudi Arabia	Group stage	13 December 1997
6	Karel Poborský	Red card	40'	Czech Republic	1–2	Uruguay	1997, Saudi Arabia	Group stage	15 December 1997
7	Mark Viduka	Red card	24'	Australia	0–6	Brazil	1997, Saudi Arabia	Final	21 December 1997
8	Yasser Radwan	Yellowred card	30', 64'	Egypt	2–2	Mexico	1999, Mexico	Group stage	27 July 1999
9	Abdel Sabry	Red card	28'	Egypt	1–5	Saudi Arabia	1999, Mexico	Group stage	29 July 1999
10	Hazem Emam	Yellowred card	37', 37'	Egypt	1–5	Saudi Arabia	1999, Mexico	Group stage	29 July 1999
11	Samir Kamouna	Red card	80'	Egypt	1–5	Saudi Arabia	1999, Mexico	Group stage	29 July 1999
12	Matt McKeon	Yellowred card	55', 63'	United States	2–0	Saudi Arabia	1999, Mexico	Third place play-off	3 August 1999
13	João Carlos	Yellowred card	46', 90+2'	Brazil	3–4	Mexico	1999, Mexico	Final	4 August 1999
14	Takayuki Suzuki	Red card	56'	Japan	1–0	Australia	2001, South Korea/Japan	Semi-finals	7 June 2001
15	Chris Killen	Yellowred card	60', 68'	New Zealand	1–3	Colombia	2003, France	Group stage	20 June 2003
16	Willy Sagnol	Red card	90'	France	2–1	Japan	2003, France	Group stage	20 June 2003
17	Ronaldinho	Yellowred card	75', 90+3'	Brazil	2–2	Turkey	2003, France	Group stage	23 June 2003
18	Bill Tchato	Yellowred card	43', 69'	Cameroon	1–0	Colombia	2003, France	Semi-finals	26 June 2003
19	Javier Saviola	Red card	90'	Argentina	1–1 (a.e.t.)	Mexico	2005, Germany	Semi-finals	26 June 2005
20	Rafael Márquez	Yellowred card	21', 90+3'	Mexico	1–1 (a.e.t.)	Argentina	2005, Germany	Semi-finals	26 June 2005
21	Mike Hanke	Red card	54'	Germany	4–3 (a.e.t.)	Mexico	2005, Germany	Third place play-off	26 June 2005
22	Ahmed Elmohamady	Red card	89'	Egypt	3–4	Brazil	2009, South Africa	Group stage	15 June 2009
23	Ricardo Clark	Red card	33'	United States	1–3	Italy	2009, South Africa	Group stage	15 June 2009
24	Sacha Kljestan	Red card	57'	United States	0–3	Brazil	2009, South Africa	Group stage	18 June 2009
25	Michael Bradley	Red card	87'	United States	2–0	Spain	2009, South Africa	Semi-finals	24 June 2009
26	Andrés Scotti	Yellowred card	42', 51'	Uruguay	8–0	Tahiti	2013, Brazil	Group stage	23 June 2013
27	Teheivarii Ludivion	Yellowred card	8', 59'	Tahiti	0–8	Uruguay	2013, Brazil	Group stage	23 June 2013
28	Riccardo Montolivo	Yellowred card	82', 110'	Italy	2–2 (a.e.t.)	Uruguay	2013, Brazil	Third place play-off	30 June 2013
29	Gerard Piqué	Red card	68'	Spain	0–3	Brazil	2013, Brazil	Final	30 June 2013
30	Yuri Zhirkov	Yellowred card	9', 68'	Russia	1–2	Mexico	2017, Russia	Group stage	24 June 2017
31	Ernest Mabouka	Red card	64'	Cameroon	1–3	Germany	2017, Russia	Group stage	25 June 2017
32	Nélson Semedo	Yellowred card	26', 106'	Portugal	2–1 (a.e.t.)	Mexico	2017, Russia	Third place play-off	2 July 2017
33	Raúl Jiménez	Yellowred card	94', 112'	Mexico	1–2 (a.e.t.)	Portugal	2017, Russia	Third place play-off	2 July 2017
