= Mustafa Doğan =

German footballer (born 1976)

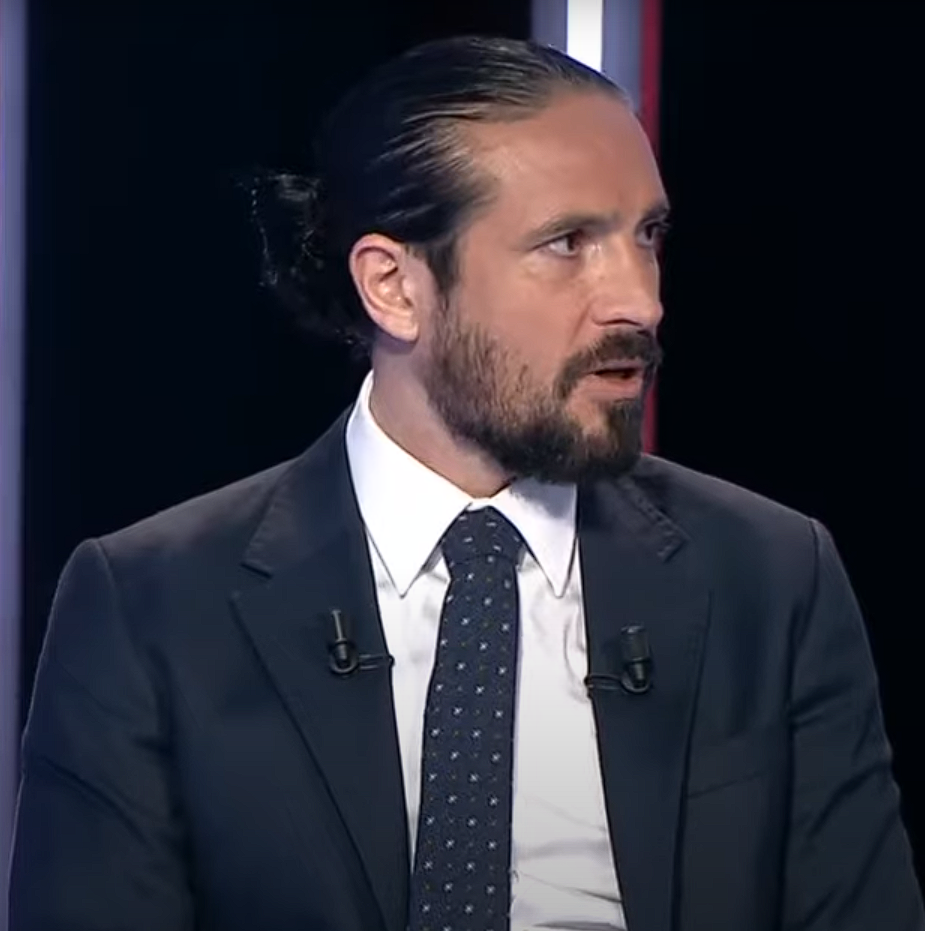
- Doğan in 2021

Personal information
- Date of birth: 1 January 1976 (age 50)
- Place of birth: Isparta, Turkey
- Height: 1.80 m (5 ft 11 in)
- Position: Centre back

Youth career
- 1984–1989: TV Asberg
- 1989–1994: Bayer Uerdingen

Senior career*
Years	Team	Apps	(Gls)
1994–1996	Bayer Uerdingen	33	(0)
1996–2003	Fenerbahçe	165	(1)
2003–2004	1. FC Köln	25	(1)
2004–2007	Beşiktaş	43	(2)
Total		266	(4)

International career
1999	Germany	2	(0)
- * Club domestic league appearances and goals

Mustafa Doğan (born 1 January 1976) is a German former professional footballer who played as a central defender. During his professional career, he played for teams in both Turkey, the country of his birth, and Germany, representing the Germany national team in 1999.

== Club career ==
A native of the village of Dedeçam, in Yalvaç district, Isparta, Doğan started his career playing for TV Asberg, a small German club. At 13, he signed his first professional contract, with KFC Uerdingen 05, having made his first-team debut on 15 May 1994, in a second division match at Wuppertaler SV.

In 1996, Doğan transferred to Istanbul's Fenerbahçe SK. He stayed there for seven years, the first five as a starter, then switched back to Germany, signing with Bundesliga outfit 1. FC Köln. On 18 October 2003, he netted his sole top flight goal, in a 1–0 home win against SC Freiburg.

Beşiktaş J.K. took it upon themselves to bring the defender back to the Turkish first division and signed Doğan in 2004–05. Hampered by several injuries, he retired in 2007, at 31.

== International career ==
After also having represented Germany's U21, Doğan was fully capped twice by his adoptive nation in 1999, the first in July, a 2–0 defeat with the United States in the FIFA Confederations Cup, playing his second and last three months later in a UEFA Euro 2000 qualifier against, of all the teams, Turkey. A goalless home draw was the outcome.

== Media career ==
After retiring, Doğan worked as football commentator for Turkish sports television NTV Spor.
