= Renny Ribera =

Bolivian footballer (born 1974)

Personal information
- Full name: Renny Ribera Vaca
- Date of birth: January 30, 1974 (age 52)
- Place of birth: Santa Cruz de la Sierra, Bolivia
- Height: 1.67 m (5 ft 6 in)
- Position: Defender

Youth career
- 1991–1995: Tahuichi Academy

Senior career*
Years	Team	Apps	(Gls)
1996–2002	Blooming	159	(17)
2003	→ The Strongest (loan)	0	(0)
2004–2005	Blooming	22	(3)
2005	→ Real Potosí (loan)	3	(0)
Total		184	(20)

International career^{‡}
1999–2000	Bolivia	14	(1)
- * Club domestic league appearances and goals as of April 8, 2008 ‡ National team caps and goals as of 20 July 2016

Renny Ribera Vaca (born January 30, 1974) is a retired Bolivian football right defender.

== Club career ==
He initiated his career playing for the prestigious Tahuichi football youth academy. At professional level he played for Blooming, The Strongest and Real Potosí.

== International career ==
He was also part of the Bolivia national team during Héctor Veira's period as manager. He played at the 1999 Copa América, the 1999 FIFA Confederations Cup (in which he scored a goal versus Egypt) and in 3 World Cup qualifiers.

== Honours ==
=== Club ===
- Blooming (2)
  - Liga de Fútbol Profesional Boliviano: 1998, 1999
- The Strongest (2)
  - Liga de Fútbol Profesional Boliviano: 2003 (A), 2003 (C)

Club Bolivar
