= Iván Castillo (footballer) =

Bolivian footballer (born 1970)

Personal information
- Full name: Iván Sabino Castillo Salinas
- Date of birth: July 11, 1970 (age 56)
- Place of birth: Coripata, Bolivia
- Height: 1.79 m (5 ft 10 in)
- Position: Defender

Senior career*
Years	Team	Apps	(Gls)
1990–1996	Bolívar	293 total	(23)
1997–1999	Gimnasia de Jujuy	35	(0)
1999–2002	Bolívar	(see above)	
2003–2004	The Strongest	56	(4)
2005–2006	La Paz	44	(3)
2007	Bolívar	(see above)	

International career^{‡}
1993–2000	Bolivia	36	(0)
- * Club domestic league appearances and goals as of May 25, 2008 ‡ National team caps and goals as of May 25, 2008

Iván Sabino Castillo Salinas (born July 11, 1970, in Coripata, La Paz) is a retired football defender from Bolivia, who played at club level for Bolívar, The Strongest and La Paz F.C. in Bolivia. He also made a short stint with Gimnasia y Esgrima de Jujuy from Argentina.

== International career ==
From 1993 to 2000, Castillo earned 36 caps playing for the Bolivia national team including participations in the 1997 Copa América, in which Bolivia finished as runners-up and the 1999 FIFA Confederations Cup held in Mexico. He represented his country in 12 FIFA World Cup qualification matches.

== Personal life ==
He is the younger brother of Bolivian midfielder Ramiro Castillo, who committed suicide in 1997.
