= Yasser Rayyan =

Egyptian footballer (born 1970)

Yasser Rayan ياسر ريان
Personal information
- Full name: Yasser Anwar Rayan
- Date of birth: 25 March 1970 (age 56)
- Place of birth: Egypt
- Position: Midfielder

Senior career*
Years	Team	Apps	(Gls)
1988–1992	Mansoura		
1992–2002	Ahly		
2002–2004	ENPPI		

International career
1990–1999	Egypt	52	(1)
- * Club domestic league appearances and goals

Yasser Anwar Rayan (Arabic: ياسر أنور ريان; born 25 March 1970) is a retired Egyptian footballer. He is also the father of Ahmed Yasser Rayan who is also a professional footballer.

== Career ==
Rayyan played several seasons as a defender for Al Ahly in the Egyptian Premier League.

He also played for the Egypt national football team, including participating at the 1992 Summer Olympics in Barcelona and the 1999 FIFA Confederations Cup in Mexico City.
