= Ronald Maul =

German former professional footballer (born 1973)

Personal information
- Date of birth: 13 February 1973 (age 53)
- Place of birth: Jena, East Germany
- Height: 1.73 m (5 ft 8 in)
- Position: Left midfielder

Youth career
- SV Gleißtal 09
- FC Carl Zeiss Jena

Senior career*
Years	Team	Apps	(Gls)
1990–1995	VfL Osnabrück		
1995–2000	Arminia Bielefeld	131	(9)
2000–2001	Hamburger SV	3	(0)
2001–2006	Hansa Rostock	113	(0)
2006–2007	FC Carl Zeiss Jena	24	(0)
2008–2010	Rot-Weiß Ahlen	31	(0)

International career
1999	Germany	2	(0)

Managerial career
- 2010–2011: Rot Weiss Ahlen (Team manager)
- 2011–2013: FC Gütersloh 2000 (Team manager)
- 2017–: SV Meppen (Team manager)
- * Club domestic league appearances and goals

Ronald Maul (born 13 February 1973) is a German former professional footballer who played as a left midfielder. He works as a team manager for FC Gütersloh 2000.

== Club career ==
After 20 years of professional football, Maul retired in February 2010. In the German top-flight he amassed 178 appearances.

== International career ==
Maul was capped twice by Germany, both appearances coming at the 1999 FIFA Confederations Cup in Mexico.

== Honours ==
Arminia Bielefeld

- 2. Bundesliga: 1998–99; Runner-up 1995–96

Rot-Weiß Ahlen

- Regionalliga Nord: 2007–08
