= Martín Menacho =

Bolivian footballer (born 1973)

Personal information
- Full name: José Martín Menacho Aguilera
- Date of birth: August 7, 1973 (age 53)
- Place of birth: Santa Cruz de la Sierra, Bolivia
- Height: 1.79 m (5 ft 10 in)
- Position: Striker

Senior career*
| Years | Team | Apps | (Gls) |
| 1993–1997 | Destroyers | 132 | (53) |
| 1998–1999 | Blooming | 43 | (11) |
| 2000 | Oriente Petrolero | 36 | (8) |
| 2001 | Wilstermann | 22 | (6) |
| 2002 | The Strongest | 7 | (1) |
| 2003–2004 | Real Potosí | 36 | (23) |
| 2005 | Sport Ancash | 19 | (4) |
| 2006 | Bolívar | 36 | (15) |
| 2007 | La Paz | 19 | (6) |
| 2008 | Guabirá | 15 | (2) |
| 2009–2010 | The Strongest | 35 | (3) |
| 2010 | Nacional Potosí | | |

International career
| 1999–2001 | Bolivia | 6 | (0) |
- * Club domestic league appearances and goals as of September 21, 2010

José Martín Menacho Aguilera (born August 7, 1973) is a retired Bolivian football striker.

== Club career ==
Nicknamed El Loco, Menacho has developed most of his football career in Liga de Fútbol Profesional Boliviano. His former clubs are Destroyers, Blooming, Oriente Petrolero, Wilstermann, Real Potosí, Bolívar, La Paz, Guabirá and Nacional Potosí. He also had a brief spell with Peruvian club Sport Ancash in 2005.

Among his accomplishments, he finished as the top scorer in the 2004 Apertura tournament with 15 goals.

== International career ==
Menacho has been capped for the Bolivia national team from 1999 to 2001. He represented his country in one FIFA World Cup qualification match and at the 1999 Confederations Cup.

== Honours ==
=== Club ===
- Blooming
  - Liga de Fútbol Profesional Boliviano: 1998, 1999
- Bolívar
  - Liga de Fútbol Profesional Boliviano: 2006 (C)

=== Individual ===
- Real Potosí
  - Liga de Fútbol Profesional Boliviano Topscorer: 2004-A (15 goals)
