= Hany Ramzy =

Egyptian footballer (born 1969)

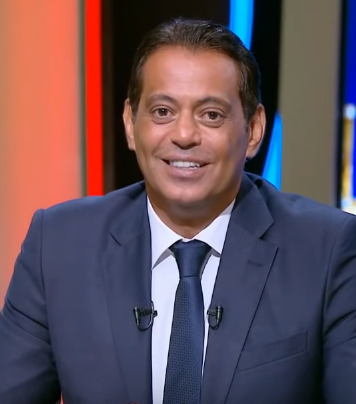

Personal information
- Full name: Hany Guda Ramzy
- Date of birth: 10 March 1969 (age 57)
- Place of birth: Cairo, Egypt
- Height: 1.85 m (6 ft 1 in)
- Position: Centre back

Youth career
- 1977–1987: Al Ahly

Senior career*
Years	Team	Apps	(Gls)
1987–1990	Al Ahly		
1990–1994	Neuchâtel Xamax	85	(9)
1994–1998	Werder Bremen	98	(3)
1998–2005	1. FC Kaiserslautern	130	(12)
2005–2006	1. FC Saarbrücken	4	(0)

International career
1988–2003	Egypt	123	(3)

Managerial career
- 2005–2008: ENPPI (assistant)
- 2007: ENPPI
- 2008–2009: Egypt U-20 (assistant)
- 2009–2010: Egypt U-20
- 2010–2012: Egypt U-23
- 2011: Egypt (caretaker)
- 2012–2013: Lierse
- 2013–2014: Wadi Degla
- 2015: ENPPI
- 2016–2017: Dubai
- 2018–2019: Egypt (assistant)
- * Club domestic league appearances and goals

Hany Guda Ramzy (Arabic: هَانِي جَوْدَة رَمْزِيّ [hæːni ˈɡuːdæ ˈɾɑmzi]) (born 10 March 1969) is an Egyptian football coach and former defender.

== Early life ==
Ramzy was born in Abdeen region of Cairo to Coptic Orthodox parents. He has one sister, Miriam.

Ramzy began his career at the age of 10. A scout from Tersana club saw him and tried to persuade him to join the youth team in the club but his father Guda Ramzy – one of Al-Ahly's fans – refused to have his son join Tersana or Al-Zamalek clubs. So his father and his uncle took him to Al Ahly, Captain Mustafa Hussein saw him and decided to put him in the youth club of the red castle. Step by step, Ramzy joined the youth national team at less than 17 years old; Captain Ahamad Rafat was his coach in this time.

== Professional career ==
Despite his young age, Ramzy's playing ability earned him a spot on Al Ahly's first team. Mahmoud El-Gohary also picked him for the Egyptian National Team's journey to the World Cup in Italy. That was the key of success for the 20-year-old player and soon he became Egypt's youngest professional.

In 1990, he started his professional career with the Swiss club Neuchâtel Xamax, as a centre-half. Swiss media nicknamed him "The Rock". In summer 1994, Ramzy was the first Egyptian player in the Bundesliga as he joined SV Werder Bremen with a $1.5 million transfer fee to become the most expensive Egyptian player of the time.

After the 1998 African Cup of Nations, Ramzy joined 1. FC Kaiserslautern with fellow Egyptian national Samir Kamouna and wore the number 6. Ramzy was famous in Kaiserslautern as he scored 12 goals from centre-back but in April 2003 after a knee injury, he spent two seasons on the bench until his contract came to an end.

After Kaiserslautern released him, on 19 October 2005, Ramzy signed for 2. Bundesliga club 1. FC Saarbrücken.

During his knee injury, Ramzy started taking lectures about coaching in Berlin. He decided to become a manager after his retirement, so he started as a member in the coaching staff in Kaiserslautern's youth team.

Ramzy returned to Egypt and became the assistant for German coach Rainer Zobel at ENPPI. Due to a lack of success, in January 2007, the club decided to replace Zobel with Ramzy to the end of the season whatever the results were. Ramzy stated that it was a big responsibility and a good step to open the door for young managers in Egypt.

Ending the 2006–07 season in ninth place, Ramzy returned to his original job as assistant coach. The club signed a contract with Anwar Salama, the former manager of Petrol Assiut.

In the middle of September 2008, Ramzy took a new step toward the international training career, he became the assistant manager of the Egyptian under-20 team. He became their head coach a year later.

In December 2009, it was announced that Ramzy had signed a two-year contract as the manager of the Egyptian under-23 team.

== Honours ==
=== Club ===
Al Ahly

- Egyptian Premier League: 1988–1989
- Egypt Cup: 1989
- Afro-Asian Cup: 1988

Werder Bremen

- DFL-Supercup: 1994

=== Individual ===
- Ramzy named as the 19th Best African player in the last 50 years.
- Named as the 5th Best African Footballer by France football 1990.
- Named as the 9th Best African Footballer by CAF 2000 and CAF 2001.
- Named as the Best Libero in the 1992 African Nations Cup.
- Named as the Best Defensive Midfielder defender in the 2002 African Nations Cup.
- Ramzy once held an Egyptian record as he played five consecutive African Nations Cups in years 1994, 1996, 1998, 2000 and 2002. But this record has been broken by teammate Ahmed Hassan, who has played in 8 consecutive African Nations Cups, which is an Egyptian and African record.

== See also ==
- List of men's footballers with 100 or more international caps
