= Christian Bouckenooghe =

New Zealand footballer

Kris Bouckenooghe
Personal information
- Full name: Christian Bouckenooghe
- Date of birth: 7 February 1977 (age 49)
- Place of birth: Cook Islands
- Height: 1.75 m (5 ft 9 in)
- Position: Defender

Senior career*
Years	Team	Apps	(Gls)
1995–1996	Rotherham United	0	(0)
1996–1997	Waregem	0	(0)
1997–2000	Roeselare	82	(13)
2000–2001	Handzame	8	(1)
2001–2002	Oostende	27	(6)
2002–2003	Ronse	27	(3)
2003–2006	Roeselare	57	(7)
2006–2008	Red Star Waasland	16	(1)
2008–2009	K.S.V. Roeselare		

International career^{‡}
1998–2009	New Zealand	35	(2)
- * Club domestic league appearances and goals as of 29 January 2007 ‡ National team caps and goals as of 10:40, 20 August 2008 (UTC)

Christian "Kris" Bouckenooghe (born 7 February 1977) is a retired New Zealand association football player of Belgian and Cook Island Māori descent. He played as a defender, mostly in the lower divisions of Belgian football with one season in the Belgian First Division.

== Club career ==
He was born in the Cook Islands of a Cook Island Māori mother and a Belgian father, subsequently moving to New Zealand as a child, where he played his youth soccer and attended Tauranga Boys' College. He has played for New Zealand at age-group level, including a play-off series against the South African under-23 team to qualify for the 2000 Sydney Olympics, scoring in the NZ team's narrow 3-4 and 0-1 losses in that series. All of his early career was spent as a midfielder or striker, until converting to defence at K.S.V. Roeselare in Belgium. His first professional club was Rotherham in England, who signed him as a teenager on the recommendation of former New Zealand national coach and ex Rotherham player, Kevin Fallon. From there he signed for KSV Roeselare in the 1990s, his first of two periods with the club. He is the first New Zealander to play in the Belgian First Division.

== International career ==
Bouckenooghe played 35 A-internationals for the New Zealand national soccer team, the All Whites scoring 2 goals. His career highlights include playing at both the 1999 and 2003 Confederations Cup in Mexico and France respectively.

== Career statistics ==
=== International ===
Appearances and goals by national team and year
National team	Year	Apps	Goals
New Zealand	1998	2	0
New Zealand	1999	12	1
New Zealand	2000	4	1
New Zealand	2001	1	0
New Zealand	2002	4	0
New Zealand	2003	4	0
New Zealand	2006	6	0
New Zealand	2007	1	0
New Zealand	2009	1	0
Total		35	2

Scores and results list New Zealand's goal tally first, score column indicates score after each Bouckenooghe goal.

List of international goals scored by Christian Bouckenooghe
No.	Date	Venue	Opponent	Score	Result	Competition	Ref.
1	3 July 1999	Kuala Lumpur, Malaysia	Malaysia	–	5–1	Friendly	
2	19 June 2000	Stade Pater, Papeete, Tahiti	Tahiti	1–0	2–0	2000 OFC Nations Cup	

== Honours ==
- Belgian Second Division:
  - Runner-up (1): 2004-05

Belgium Premier Division 2005-06 New Zealand International player of the year 1999
