= Mohsin al-Harthi =

Saudi Arabian footballer

Personal information
- Date of birth: 17 July 1976 (age 50)
- Place of birth: Saudi Arabia
- Height: 1.84 m (6 ft 1/2 in)
- Position: Defender

Senior career*
Years	Team	Apps	(Gls)
1998–2006	Al-Nassr		
2006–2007	Al-Fayha		
2007–2009	Ohod		

International career
1999–2002	Saudi Arabia	22	(1)
- * Club domestic league appearances and goals

Mohsin al-Harthi (Arabic: محسن الحارثي) (born 17 July 1976) is a Saudi Arabian footballer.

== Career ==
At the club level, Al-Harthi spent most of his career with Al-Nasr.

He also represented the Saudi Arabia national football team, participating in the 2002 FIFA World Cup and 1999 FIFA Confederations Cup.

== Career statistics ==
=== International ===
Appearances and goals by national team and year
National team	Year	Apps	Goals
Saudi Arabia	1999	12	0
Saudi Arabia	2000	–	
Saudi Arabia	2001	7	1
Saudi Arabia	2002	3	0
Total		22	1

Scores and results list Saudi Arabia's goal tally first, score column indicates score after each al-Harthi goal.

List of international goals scored by Mohsin al-Harthi
No.	Date	Venue	Opponent	Score	Result	Competition
1	21 February 2001	Prince Mohamed bin Fahd Stadium, Dammam, Saudi Arabia	Bangladesh	1–0	6–0	2002 FIFA World Cup qualification
