= Jason Batty =

New Zealand footballer and coach

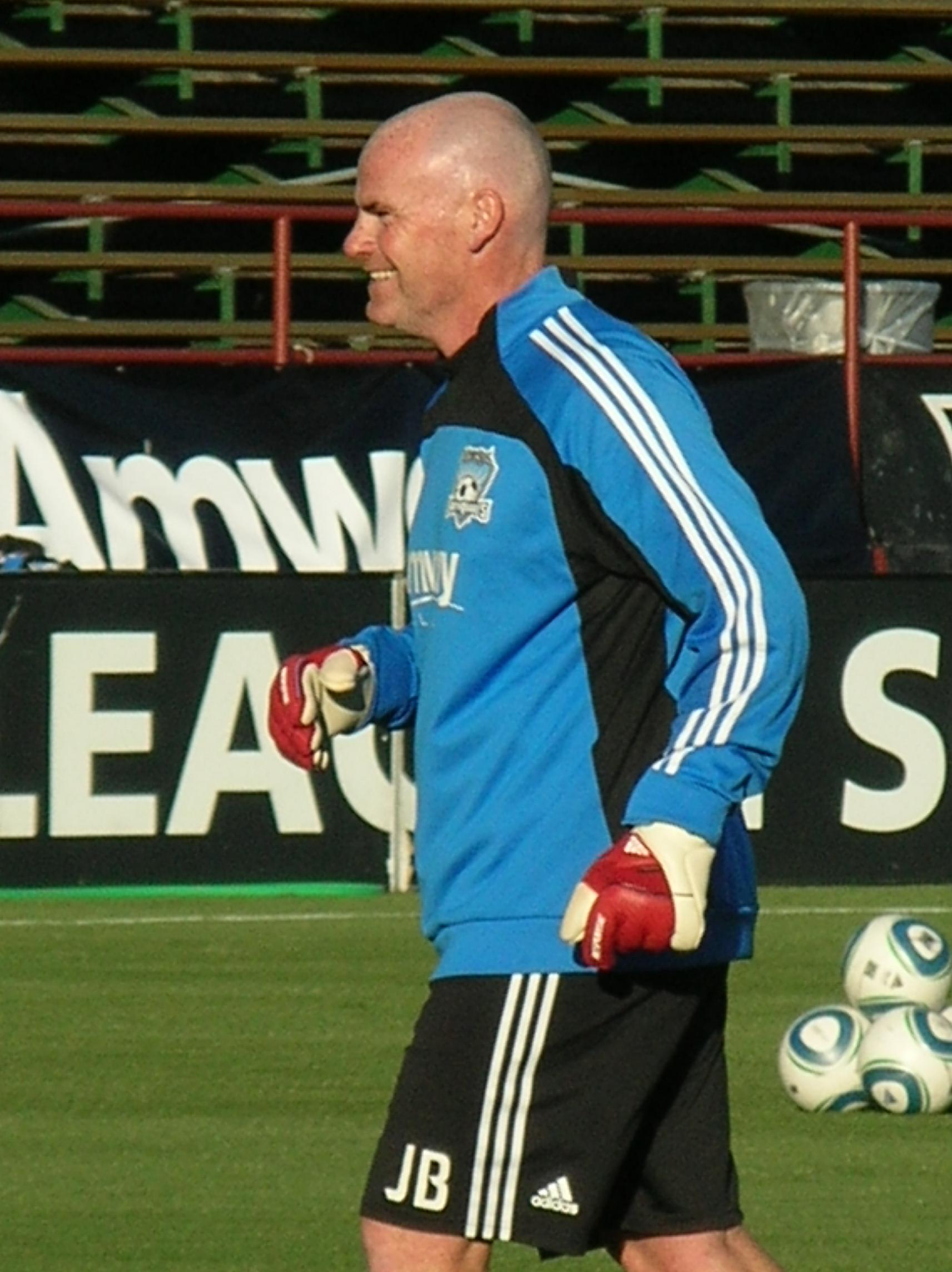
- Batty with the Earthquakes in September 2010

Personal information
- Full name: Jason Alfred Batty
- Date of birth: 23 March 1971 (age 55)
- Place of birth: Auckland, New Zealand
- Position: Goalkeeper

Team information
- Current team: Nashville SC (Academy GK Director)

Youth career
- 1988–1990: Norwich City

Senior career*
Years	Team	Apps	(Gls)
1989–1990	Wroxham	12	(0)
1990–1991	Blockhouse Bay	18	(0)
1992–1997	North Shore United	82	(0)
1997	Albuquerque Geckos	18	(0)
1998–1999	Bohemians	7	(0)
1999	Geylang United	14	(0)
1999–2000	Football Kingz	16	(0)
2000–2001	Grimsby Town	0	(0)
2001	Scunthorpe United	0	(0)
2001	Stalybridge Celtic	12	(0)
2002	Glenfield Rovers	8	(0)
2002	California Gold	7	(0)
2003	Caversham	12	(0)
Total		206	(0)

International career
1994–2003	New Zealand	55	(0)

Managerial career
- 2003–2006: Dartmouth College (Assistant/GK Coach)
- 2008–2015: San Jose Earthquakes (Assistant/GK Coach)
- 2016–2017: New Zealand U-17/U-20 (Goalkeeper Coach)
- 2018–2020: Utah Royals FC (Assistant/GK Coach)
- 2019–2020: New Zealand(Assistant/GK Coach)
- 2020–: Nashville SC (Academy GK Director)
Medal record
Representing New Zealand
Men's Association football
OFC Nations Cup
Winner	1998 Australia
Winner	2002 New Zealand
Runner-up	2000 Tahiti
- * Club domestic league appearances and goals

Jason Alfred Batty (born 23 March 1971) is a New Zealand former professional footballer, who played as a goalkeeper, and is the current New Zealand National Team Assistant/Goalkeeping Coach. Batty frequently represented the New Zealand national team in the 1990s.

Batty later became the Assistant coach at Dartmouth College in the U.S. and served as the Director of Goalkeeping for Texas Premier SC. Batty spent eight seasons as Goalkeeper Coach in the MLS with the San Jose Earthquakes, where they got to the Eastern Conference Final in 2010 and won the MLS Supporters Shield in 2012. He then was named Assistant Coach for New Zealand Youth National Teams. In 2018 Batty was appointed Assistant / Goalkeeping Coach in the National Women's Soccer League for new expansion club Utah Royals FC along with the Real Salt Lake Academy. From 2019 to the present, Batty is an Assistant and Goalkeeping Coach with the New Zealand national football team. Batty is currently the Academy GK Director of MLS side Nashville SC.

== Club career ==
Batty was born in Auckland, New Zealand. He started his career at Norwich City F.C. in their Academy system, he then moved back in New Zealand for a period of time before heading back overseas to join up with Bohemian F.C. in the League of Ireland. He then made 14 appearances for a Singapore team S-League before joining the Football Kingz. Batty made 16 appearances for the Football Kingz in their inaugural season in the NSL in 1999 before heading back to the UK for a spell in England with Championship side Grimsby Town in August 2000. He failed to dislodge regular shot stopper Danny Coyne and understudy Steve Croudson. After only six months he left the club and joined Scunthorpe United on similar terms but left at the end of the season after failing to make a 1st Team appearance. He then briefly played for Stalybridge Celtic in the Conference League.

== International career ==
Batty made his New Zealand A-international debut in a 3–0 win over Singapore on 21 February 1995 and quickly became first choice goalkeeper. He went on to collect 55 caps between 1994 and 2003. Playing in two FIFA Confederation Cup tournaments in 1999 in Mexico and 2003 in France.

== Coaching career ==
In 2003, Batty started his coaching career as the Assistant and Goalkeeping Coach for both Men's and Women's programs at Dartmouth College. In 2008, Batty was hired as an Assistant and Goalkeeping Coach for the MLS side San Jose Earthquakes. In 2014, Batty was retained as Assistant Coach for the MLS side San Jose Earthquakes following several coaching changes at the club. In 2016, Batty became Goalkeeping Coach for the U17 & U20 New Zealand national team. In 2018, Batty was hired as Assistant and Goalkeeping Coach for the National Women's Soccer League for new expansion club Utah Royals and the MLS side Real Salt Lake Academy. In 2019, Batty became goalkeeper coach for the New Zealand national team. In 2020, Batty was hired as Academy Goalkeeper Director at MLS side Nashville SC.

== Honours ==
=== Player ===
New Zealand

- OFC Nations Cup: 1998, 2002; Runner-up, 2000

=== Individual ===
- New Zealand Player of the Year: 1997

=== Manager ===
- MLS Supporters Shield: 2012
