= César Belli =

Brazilian footballer (born 1975)

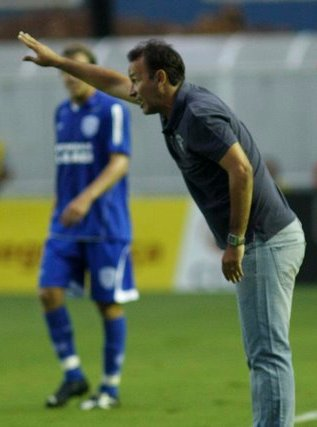
- Belli as Monte Azul manager in 2010

Personal information
- Full name: César Augusto Belli Michelon
- Date of birth: 16 November 1975 (age 50)
- Place of birth: Bebedouro, Brazil
- Height: 1.83 m (6 ft 0 in)
- Position: Centre-back

Youth career
- 1992–1995: Ponte Preta

Senior career*
Years	Team	Apps	(Gls)
1995–1999	Portuguesa-SP		
1999–2000	Paris Saint-Germain	10	(1)
2000–2002	Rennes	37	(2)
2002–2003	Palmeiras	17	(2)
2003	Corinthians	16	(2)
2004–2006	Tenerife	79	(5)
2006–2007	Atletico-PR	7	(0)
2007	Fortaleza		
2008	Ponte Preta		
2009	Mirassol		

International career
1998–1999	Brazil	8	(0)

Managerial career
- 2010: Monte Azul
- * Club domestic league appearances and goals

César Augusto Belli Michelon (born 16 November 1975) is a Brazilian former professional footballer who played as a centre-back. Capped eight times for Brazil, he played club football in France and Spain as well as in his native country. He played for Paris Saint-Germain in the 1999–2000 season, scoring one goal in 12 appearances across all competitions. He became assistant for the under-20 team of Portuguesa in 2022.

== Honours ==
Corinthians

- Campeonato Paulista: 2003

Brazil

- Copa América: 1999
