= Mohammed Sheliah =

Saudi Arabian footballer

Personal information
- Full name: Mohammed Sheliah Al-Jahani
- Date of birth: 28 September 1974 (age 52)
- Place of birth: Jeddah, Saudi Arabia
- Height: 1.75 m (5 ft 9 in)
- Position: Defender

Senior career*
Years	Team	Apps	(Gls)
1992–2004	Al Ahli Saudi FC		

International career
1994–2002	Saudi Arabia	104	(0)
- * Club domestic league appearances and goals

Mohammed Sheliah Al-Jahani (Arabic: محمد شليه الجهني) (born 28 September 1974) is a retired Saudi Arabian footballer.

== Club career ==
At the club level, he played most of his career for Al Ahli.

== International career ==
Al-Jahani also played for the Saudi Arabia national football team, and was a participant in the 1998 FIFA World Cup, 2002 FIFA World Cup, 1997 FIFA Confederations Cup and 1999 FIFA Confederations Cup.

He also participated in the 1996 Summer Olympics and the 1993 FIFA World Youth Championship.

== See also ==
- List of men's footballers with 100 or more international caps
