= Limberg Gutiérrez (footballer, born 1977) =

Bolivian footballer (born 1977)

Personal information
- Full name: Limberg Gutiérrez Mariscal
- Date of birth: 19 November 1977 (age 48)
- Place of birth: Santa Cruz de la Sierra, Bolivia
- Height: 1.73 m (5 ft 8 in)
- Position: Attacking midfielder

Youth career
- 1995–1996: Club Universidad

Senior career*
Years	Team	Apps	(Gls)
1996–2000	Blooming	142	(71)
2001	→ Nacional (loan)	31	(5)
2002	Blooming	24	(10)
2003–2006	Bolívar	115	(58)
2007	Blooming	34	(11)
2008	Oriente Petrolero	23	(8)
2009–2010	The Strongest	49	(21)
2011	Blooming	19	(2)
2014	Sport Boys	2	(1)

International career
1997–2009	Bolivia	54	(4)
- * Club domestic league appearances and goals

Limberg Gutiérrez Mariscal (born 19 November 1977) is a Bolivian retired footballer who played as an attacking midfielder. He was a player known for his scoring range and free-kick abilities.

== Club career ==
Gutiérrez was born in Santa Cruz de la Sierra. His former clubs include Blooming, where he spent most of his football career, Bolívar, The Strongest, Oriente Petrolero, and Sport Boys Warnes in Bolivia, as well as Uruguayan giants Nacional de Montevideo.

== International career ==
Gutiérrez was a member of the Bolivia national team in Copa América 2004. He also has participated 24 times in FIFA World Cup qualifiers for 1998, 2002, and 2006, and played at the 1999 Confederations Cup. He earned a total of 54 caps and scored 4 goals for the Bolivia national team between 1997 and 2009.

== Career statistics ==
=== International goals ===
#	Date	Venue	Opponent	Score	Result	Competition
1.	25 July 1999	Estadio Azteca, Mexico City, Mexico	Egypt	2–2	Draw	1999 FIFA Confederations Cup
2.	31 August 2003	Estadio Hernando Siles, La Paz, Bolivia	Panama	3–0	Win	Friendly
3.	5 June 2004	Estadio Olímpico Atahualpa, Quito, Ecuador	Ecuador	2–3	Loss	2006 FIFA World Cup qualification
4.	12 October 2005	Estadio Jorge Basadre, Tacna, Peru	Peru	1–4	Loss	2006 FIFA World Cup qualification
Correct as of 6 February 2021

== Honours ==
Blooming

- Liga de Fútbol Profesional Boliviano: 1998, 1999

Nacional

- Primera División Uruguaya: 2001

Bolívar

- Liga de Fútbol Profesional Boliviano: 2004 (A), 2005 (AD), 2006 (C)
- Copa Sudamericana runner-up: 2004

Bolivia

- Copa América runner-up: 1997
