= Chris Zoricich =

New Zealand footballer

Personal information
- Full name: Christopher Vincent Zoricich
- Date of birth: 3 May 1969 (age 57)
- Place of birth: Auckland, New Zealand
- Height: 1.79 m (5 ft 10 1/2 in)
- Position: Defender

Team information
- Current team: Newcastle Jets Youth (head coach)

Senior career*
Years	Team	Apps	(Gls)
1988	Papatoetoe	0	(0)
1989–1994	Leyton Orient	62	(1)
1994	Central United		
1994–1996	Brisbane Strikers	51	(6)
1996	Welling United	1	(0)
1996–1997	Chelsea	205	(16)
1997–1999	Brisbane Strikers	42	(2)
1999–2000	Sydney Olympic	25	(0)
2000–2003	Newcastle United Jets	50	(0)
2003–2004	Margate	11	(0)
2004–2005	St Albans City	39	(2)
2005	Harlow Town		
2005	Boreham Wood		
2005	Heybridge Swifts		
2005–2006	Wealdstone		
2010	Central United		

International career
1988–2003	New Zealand	57	(1)

Managerial career
- 2018–2022: Western Springs
- 2023–2025: Cooks Hill United
- 2026–: Newcastle Jets Youth
Medal record
Representing New Zealand
Men's Association football
OFC Nations Cup
Winner	1998 Australia
Winner	2002 New Zealand
Runner-up	2000 Tahiti
- * Club domestic league appearances and goals

Chris "Zorro" Zoricich (Croatian: Zoričić, Croatian pronunciation: [zor̩itʃitɕ]; born 3 May 1969) is a New Zealand association football player who represented the New Zealand national football team in the 1980s and 1990s. Born to Croat parents, he began playing football in his native Auckland for Blockhouse Bay Under-7's and went on to play over 50 times for his country.

== Club career ==
Zoricich, nicknamed "Zorro", began his senior career with Papatoetoe in Auckland before moving to Leyton Orient in England between 1990 and 1993. He made 59 first team appearances there, and 12 as a substitute during his time at the club, before work permit restrictions forced him to return home. A group of Orient fans protested outside the Home Office to try to keep him in the country.

In 1994, Zoricich returned to New Zealand to play for Central United, a Croatian-influenced team. His brother, Michael (who played Davis Cup tennis for New Zealand), and his father, Ivan, also turned out for Central at various points. However it was not long before Zoricich was on the move again, this time to Brisbane Strikers in the Australian National Soccer League. He spent two seasons in Australia before heading to England to try his luck again. He made one appearance for Welling United in the Vauxhall Conference and also had a trial spell with Chelsea, at that time managed by Ruud Gullit. During his time at Stamford Bridge, Zoricich never made the first team but was a regular in the reserve side's defence.

Zoricich returned to Australia to re-sign for the Brisbane Strikers in 1997, after the club had won the NSL championship on their home ground. He then ended his NSL career by playing for Newcastle Breakers and Newcastle United, before returning to England as his English wife was homesick. After trialling with League Two side, Mansfield Town, he signed for Margate in the Nationwide Conference and then moved on to St Albans City in the Conference South Division. This was followed by short spells at Harlow Town, Boreham Wood, Heybridge Swifts and Wealdstone.

== International career ==
Zoricich made his international debut against Israel on 27 March 1988. He went on to win 57 caps in full 'A' internationals, including captaining the All Whites at the 1999 Confederations Cup in Mexico and the 2003 Confederations Cup in France. His only international goal was in a 1–2 loss to USA in June 1999 at the Confederations Cup.

=== International goals ===
Scores and results list New Zealand's goal tally first.

No	Date	Venue	Opponent	Score	Result	Competition
1.	24 July 1999	Estadio Jalisco, Guadalajara, Mexico	United States	1–2	1–2	1999 FIFA Confederations Cup

== After International football ==
Zoricich as of 2014 is the premier football coach a Saint Kentigern College in Auckland.

From 2022 to 2025, Zoricich has been Head Coach of Cooks Hill United FC

From late 2025, Zoricich appointed as the Head Coaches of the Newcastle Jets Youth Men’s Team.

== Honours ==
New Zealand

- OFC Nations Cup: 1998, 2002; Runner-up, 2000
