= Khaled Gahwji =

Saudi Arabian footballer

Personal information
- Full name: Khaled Gahwji
- Date of birth: July 7, 1975 (age 51)
- Place of birth: Jeddah, Saudi Arabia
- Height: 1.70 m (5 ft 7 in)
- Position: Midfielder

Senior career*
Years	Team	Apps	(Gls)
1994–2004	Al-Ahli	200	(37)
2004–2007	Al-Ittihad	15	(3)
2007–2010	Al Rabea	50	(4)

International career
1999	Saudi Arabia	2	(0)
- * Club domestic league appearances and goals

Khaled Gahwji (Arabic: خالد قهوجي; born July 7, 1975) is a Saudi football player.

== Honours ==
=== Club ===
- Al-Ahli (Jeddah)

- Crown Prince Cup: 1997, 2003.
- Saudi Federation Cup: 2001, 2002.
- Gulf Club Champions Cup: 2002.
- Arab Champions League: 2003.

=== National team ===
- Saudi Arabia football National team

- 1999 FIFA Confederations Cup: 4th Place
