= Beto (footballer, born 1975) =

Brazilian footballer (born 1975)

Personal information
- Full name: Joubert Araújo Martins
- Date of birth: 7 January 1975 (age 51)
- Place of birth: Cuiabá, Brazil
- Height: 1.76 m (5 ft 9 in)
- Position: Midfielder

Youth career
- 1993–1995: Botafogo

Senior career*
Years	Team	Apps	(Gls)
1994–1996	Botafogo	45	(0)
1996–1997	Napoli	22	(4)
1997–1998	Grêmio	14	(3)
1998–2000	Flamengo	35	(7)
2000	→ São Paulo (loan)	18	(3)
2001–2002	Flamengo	20	(2)
2002	Fluminense	15	(3)
2003	Consadole Sapporo	7	(1)
2003–2004	Vasco da Gama	20	(2)
2004–2006	Sanfrecce Hiroshima	55	(3)
2007	Itumbiara		
2007	Brasiliense	7	(0)
2008	Vasco da Gama	4	(0)
2009	Confiança	7	(1)

International career
1995–1999	Brazil	13	(2)
- * Club domestic league appearances and goals

Joubert Araújo Martins, or simply Beto (born 7 January 1975, in Cuiabá) is a Brazilian former footballer who played as a midfielder. During his career, he played for several Brazilian clubs such as Botafogo, Grêmio, Flamengo, Fluminense and Vasco da Gama. Infamous for partying, he was nicknamed Beto Cachaça by rivals.

Beto made a very promising beginning to his career with Botafogo, and debut on the Brazil national team in 1995, when they won at an away homefriendly against Argentina, in Buenos Aires, 1–0. He would play for the national team on 13 occasions, and was a member of the squad that won the 1999 Copa América, in Paraguay.

Beto was on Botafogo de Futebol e Regatas when they won the 1995 Brazilian national championship, and was on Flamengo when they won the Rio de Janeiro state championship three consecutive seasons (1999 to 2001). With Flamengo, he became a fan-favourite, for his tenacity that was well demonstrated in the 2000 and 2001 finals against Vasco da Gama.

== Career statistics ==
=== Club ===
Club performance			League		Cup		League Cup		Continental		Total	
Season	Club	League	Apps	Goals	Apps	Goals	Apps	Goals	Apps	Goals	Apps	Goals
Brazil			League		Copa do Brasil		League Cup		South America		Total	
1994	Botafogo	Série A	22	0							22	0
1995	Botafogo	Série A	23	0							23	0
1996	Botafogo	Série A	0	0							0	0
Italy			League		Coppa Italia		League Cup		Europe		Total	
1996–97	Napoli	Serie A	22	4							22	4
Brazil			League		Copa do Brasil		League Cup		South America		Total	
1997	Grêmio	Série A	14	3							14	3
1998	Flamengo	Série A	19	6							19	6
1999	Flamengo	Série A	16	1							16	1
2000	São Paulo	Série A	18	3							18	3
2001	Flamengo	Série A	20	2							20	2
2002	Fluminense	Série A	15	3							15	3
Japan			League		Emperor's Cup		J.League Cup		Asia		Total	
2003	Consadole Sapporo	J2 League	7	1	0	0	-		-		7	1
Brazil			League		Copa do Brasil		League Cup		South America		Total	
2003	Vasco da Gama	Série A	17	2							17	2
2004	Vasco da Gama	Série A	3	0							3	0
Japan			League		Emperor's Cup		J.League Cup		Asia		Total	
2004	Sanfrecce Hiroshima	J1 League	14	2	1	0	1	0	-		16	2
2005	Sanfrecce Hiroshima	J1 League	28	1	2	0	5	0	-		35	1
2006	Sanfrecce Hiroshima	J1 League	13	0	0	0	6	0	-		19	0
Brazil			League		Copa do Brasil		League Cup		South America		Total	
2007	Itumbiara	Série C	0	0							0	0
2007	Brasiliense	Série B	7	0							7	0
2008	Vasco da Gama	Série A	4	0							4	0
Country	Brazil		178	20							178	20
Country	Italy		22	4							22	4
Country	Japan		62	4	3	0	12	0	-		77	4
Total			262	28	3	0	12	0	0	0	277	28

=== International ===
Brazil national team
Year	Apps	Goals
1995	2	0
1996	2	0
1997	0	0
1998	0	0
1999	8	0
Total	12	0

=== Performances in Major International Tournaments ===
Team	Competition	Category	Apps	Goals	Team Record
Brazil	1995 Copa América	Senior	2	0	Runners-up
Brazil	1999 Copa América	Senior	3	0	Champions

== Honours ==
=== Club ===
- Brazilian League: 1995
- Guanabara Cup: 1999
- Rio de Janeiro state championship: 1999, 2000, 2001, 2002, 2003

=== International ===
Brazil

- Pre-Olympic Tournament: 1996
- Copa América: 1999
