= Abdel Sattar Sabry =

Egyptian footballer (born 1974)

Personal information
- Full name: Abdel Sattar Sabry Abdel Majid Mahmoud
- Date of birth: 19 June 1974 (age 52)
- Place of birth: Cairo, Egypt
- Height: 1.78 m (5 ft 10 in)
- Position: Attacking midfielder

Youth career
- Al Mokawloon

Senior career*
Years	Team	Apps	(Gls)
1994–1997	Al Mokawloon Al Arab		
1997–1999	Tirol Innsbruck	28	(2)
1999–2000	PAOK	11	(4)
2000–2002	Benfica	37	(8)
2002–2003	Marítimo	15	(1)
2003–2004	C.F. Estrela da Amadora	21	(2)
2004–2005	ENPPI		
2005–2010	El Geish		
Total		112	(17)

International career
1995–2001	Egypt	70	(11)
Medal record
Men's football
Representing Egypt
Africa Cup of Nations
Winner	1998 Burkina Faso
African Games
Gold medal – first place	1995 African Games
- * Club domestic league appearances and goals

Abdel Sattar Sabry Abdel Majid Mahmoud (Arabic: عَبْد السَّتَّار صَبْرِيّ عَبْد الْمَجِيد مَحْمُود; born 19 June 1974), known as Sabry, is an Egyptian former professional footballer who played as an attacking midfielder.

== Club career ==
A skilled offensive player, Sabry was born in Cairo, and started playing with Al-Mokawloon al-Arab, moving abroad in 1997 to represent Austria's FC Tirol Innsbruck. He started 1999–2000 in the Super League Greece with PAOK, but switched in January 2000 to S.L. Benfica. In that season, he scored free kick against Sporting CP.

Sabry would play in Portugal until May 2004, representing C.S. Marítimo (January 2002-June 2003) and C.F. Estrela da Amadora. He subsequently returned to his homeland, playing with ENPPI Club for a few months and joining El Geish shortly after, in the Egyptian Premier League.

Sabry ended his playing career in July 2010, at the age of 36. Subsequently, he joined El Geish's coaching staff.

== International career ==
A prominent feature in the Egypt national team in the mid-late 1990s, Sabry made his debut against Angola in 1995. He was part of the gold medal-winning side in the 1995 All-Africa Games, and featured in the 1998 Africa Cup of Nations squad which finished champion in Burkina Faso, winning 70 full caps in only six years of international play and scoring 11 goals.

== Career statistics ==
=== International goals ===
Scores and results list Egypt's goal tally first, score column indicates score after each Sabry goal.

List of international goals scored by Abdel Sattar Sabry
No.	Date	Venue	Opponent	Score	Result	Competition
5	18 December 1997	Aswan Stadium, Aswan, Egypt	Togo	7–2	7–2	Friendly
6	25 July 1999	Estadio Azteca, Mexico City, Mexico	Bolivia	1–0	2–2	1999 FIFA Confederations Cup
7	9 January 2001	International Stadium, Cairo, Egypt	Zambia	1–0	3–0	Friendly
8	9 January 2001	International Stadium, Cairo, Egypt	Zambia	3–0	3–0	Friendly
9	17 January 2001	International Stadium, Cairo, Egypt	Libya	4–0	4–0	2002 African Cup of Nations qualification
10	11 March 2001	International Stadium, Cairo, Egypt	Algeria	2–1	5–2	2002 World Cup qualification
11	13 July 2001	Alexandria Stadium, Alexandria, Egypt	Namibia	8–2	8–2	2002 World Cup qualification

== Honours ==
=== International ===
Egypt

- African Cup of Nations: 1998
- All-Africa Games: 1995
