= Yasser Radwan =

Egyptian footballer (born 1972)

Personal information
- Date of birth: 22 April 1972 (age 54)
- Place of birth: Dakahlia, Egypt
- Height: 1.76 m (5 ft 9 in)
- Position: Midfielder

Senior career*
Years	Team	Apps	(Gls)
1992–1996	Baladeyet Al-Mahalla		
1996–2002	Hansa Rostock	133	(5)
2002–2004	Al Ahly		
2004–2005	Baladeyet Al-Mahalla		
2005–2006	Ghazl El Mahalla		
2006–2007	Olympic Club (Egypt)		

International career
1995–2002	Egypt	61	(3)
- * Club domestic league appearances and goals

Yasser Radwan (born 22 April 1972) is an Egyptian former professional footballer who played as a midfielder. He was a member of the Egypt national team in the Africa Cup of Nations in 1996, 1998, 2000 and 2002, winning the tournament with the national squad in 1998.

Radwan played professional football abroad with German side Hansa Rostock.

== Career statistics ==
Scores and results list Egypt's goal tally first, score column indicates score after each Radwan goal.

List of international goals scored by Yasser Radwan
No.	Date	Venue	Opponent	Score	Result	Competition
1	13 February 1998	Stade Municipal, Bobo Dioulasso, Burkina Faso	Zambia	4–0	4–0	1998 African Cup of Nations
2	25 July 1999	Estadio Azteca, Mexico City, Mexico	Bolivia	2–2	2–2	1999 FIFA Confederations Cup
3	23 January 2000	Sani Abacha Stadium, Kano, Nigeria	Zambia	1–0	2–0	2000 African Cup of Nations
