= Ibrahim Suwayed =

Saudi Arabian footballer

Personal information
- Full name: Ibrahim Suwayed Mahboub Al-Shahrani
- Date of birth: 21 July 1974 (age 52)
- Place of birth: Abha, Saudi Arabia
- Height: 1.82 m (5 ft 11 1/2 in)
- Position: Midfielder

Senior career*
Years	Team	Apps	(Gls)
1994–1995	Abha		
1995–2004	Al-Ahli		
2004–2009	Ittihad		

International career
1997–2005	Saudi Arabia	86	(24)
- * Club domestic league appearances and goals

Ibrahim Suwayed Mahboub Al-Shahrani (Arabic: إِبْرَاهِيم سُوَيْد مَحْبُوب الشَّهْرَانِيّ) (born 21 July 1974) is a Saudi Arabian former football player who played most of his career for Al-Ahli. He played for the Saudi Arabia national football team and was a member of the national squad at the 1998 and at the 2002 FIFA World Cups.

His most significant goal was against Qatar in Doha during the 1998 FIFA World Cup qualification (AFC) final match which eliminated Qatar and led Saudi Arabia to the top of Group A, directly qualifying to 1998 FIFA World Cup in France and leaving Iran in second place for the AFC Play-off against Japan.

== International goals ==
Scores and results list Saudi Arabia's goal tally first.

No	Date	Venue	Opponent	Score	Result	Competition
1.	2 March 1997	King Fahd International Stadium, Riyadh, Saudi Arabia	Syria	?–0	3–0	Friendly
2.	16 March 1997	Shah Alam Stadium, Shah Alam, Malaysia	Chinese Taipei	2–0	2–0	1998 FIFA World Cup qualification
3.	20 March 1997	Shah Alam Stadium, Shah Alam, Malaysia	Bangladesh	3–1	4–1	1998 FIFA World Cup qualification
4.	27 March 1997	Youth Welfare Stadium, Jeddah, Saudi Arabia	Bangladesh	1–0	3–0	1998 FIFA World Cup qualification
5.	19 September 1997	Azadi Stadium, Tehran, Iran	Iran	1–0	1–1	1998 FIFA World Cup qualification
6.	12 November 1997	Jassim Bin Hamad Stadium, Doha, Qatar	Qatar	1–0	1–0	1998 FIFA World Cup qualification
7.	17 May 1998	Stade Pierre de Coubertin, Cannes, France	Namibia	2–1	2–1	Friendly
8.	11 September 1998	Prince Mohamed bin Fahd Stadium, Dammam, Saudi Arabia	Tanzania	3–0	8–0	Friendly
9.	11 September 1998	Prince Mohamed bin Fahd Stadium, Dammam, Saudi Arabia	Tanzania	6–0	8–0	Friendly
10.	11 September 1998	Prince Mohamed bin Fahd Stadium, Dammam, Saudi Arabia	Tanzania	8–0	8–0	Friendly
11.	17 September 1998	Prince Mohamed bin Fahd Stadium, Dammam, Saudi Arabia	Senegal	3–0	3–2	Friendly
12.	22 June 1999	King Fahd International Stadium, Riyadh, Saudi Arabia	Jordan	?–?	2–1	Friendly
13.	9 July 1999	Titan Stadium, Fullerton, United States	Canada	1–0	2–0	Friendly
14.	15 July 1999	Titan Stadium, Fullerton, United States	Jamaica	?–0	4–0	Friendly
15.	15 July 1999	Titan Stadium, Fullerton, United States	Jamaica	?–0	4–0	Friendly
16.	29 July 1999	Estadio Azteca, Mexico City, Mexico	Egypt	3–0	5–1	1999 FIFA Confederations Cup
17.	8 August 2001	Zayed Sports City Stadium, Abu Dhabi, United Arab Emirates	United Arab Emirates	1–0	1–0	Friendly
18.	14 May 2002	King Fahd International Stadium, Riyadh, Saudi Arabia	Senegal	3–2	3–2	Friendly
19.	1 January 2004	Al-Sadaqua Walsalam Stadium, Kuwait City, Kuwait	Bahrain	1–0	1–0	16th Arabian Gulf Cup
20.	18 February 2004	King Fahd International Stadium, Riyadh, Saudi Arabia	Indonesia	1–0	3–0	2006 FIFA World Cup qualification
21.	18 February 2004	King Fahd International Stadium, Riyadh, Saudi Arabia	Indonesia	2–0	3–0	2006 FIFA World Cup qualification
22.	31 March 2004	Sugathadasa Stadium, Colombo, Sri Lanka	Sri Lanka	1–0	1–0	2006 FIFA World Cup qualification
23.	6 October 2004	Prince Abdullah Al Faisal Stadium, Jeddah, Saudi Arabia	Syria	2–1	2–2	Friendly
24.	14 December 2004	Ahmed bin Ali Stadium, Al Rayyan, Qatar	Yemen	2–0	2–0	17th Arabian Gulf Cup
