= Héctor Veira =

Argentine footballer and manager

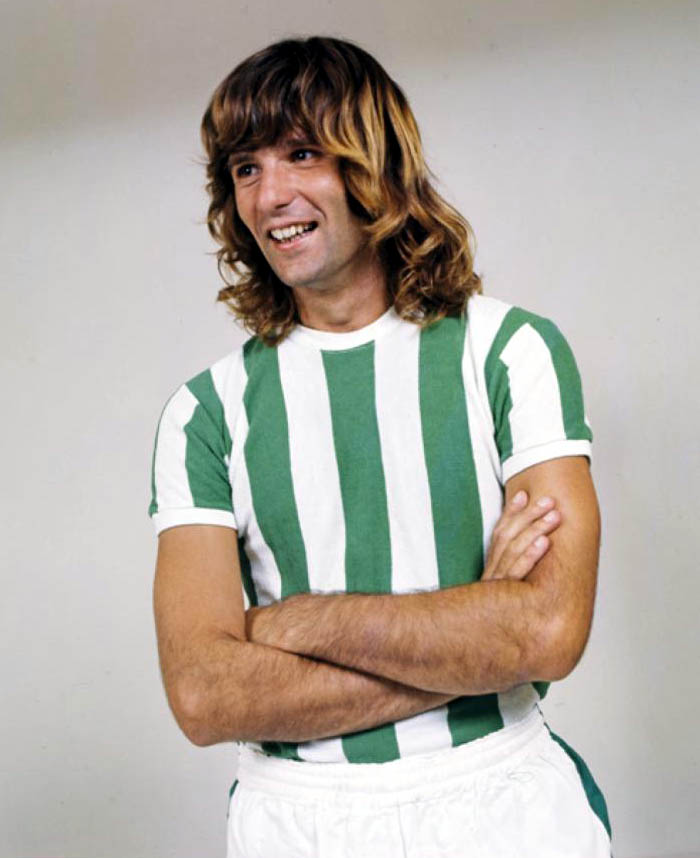
- Veira in Banfield, 1974

Personal information
- Full name: Héctor Rodolfo Veira
- Date of birth: May 29, 1946 (age 80)
- Place of birth: Buenos Aires, Argentina
- Position: Striker

Senior career*
Years	Team	Apps	(Gls)
1963–1969	San Lorenzo	128	(67)
1970–1971	Huracán	54	(21)
1971–1972	Laguna		
1972–1973	San Lorenzo		
1974	Banfield	16	(9)
1975–1976	Sevilla	0	(0)
1976	Corinthians	4	(0)
1977	Universidad de Chile	18	(10)
1978	Comunicaciones		
1978	Oriente Petrolero		

International career
1965–1967	Argentina	2	(0)

Managerial career
- 1980: San Lorenzo
- 1983–1984: San Lorenzo
- 1984: Vélez Sársfield
- 1985–1987: River Plate
- 1987–1990: San Lorenzo
- 1990–1991: Cádiz
- 1992–1996: San Lorenzo
- 1996–1998: Boca Juniors
- 1998–2000: Bolivia
- 2000–2001: Lanús
- 2002: Newell's Old Boys
- 2004: Quilmes
- 2004: San Lorenzo
- * Club domestic league appearances and goals as of October 2007

Héctor "Bambino" Veira (born May 29, 1946) is a former Argentine professional footballer and former coach. Since retiring as a player he has gone on to win several major titles as a manager, including the Copa Libertadores and the Intercontinental Cup, both in 1986 with River Plate. He is also considered an idol by San Lorenzo.

== Playing career ==
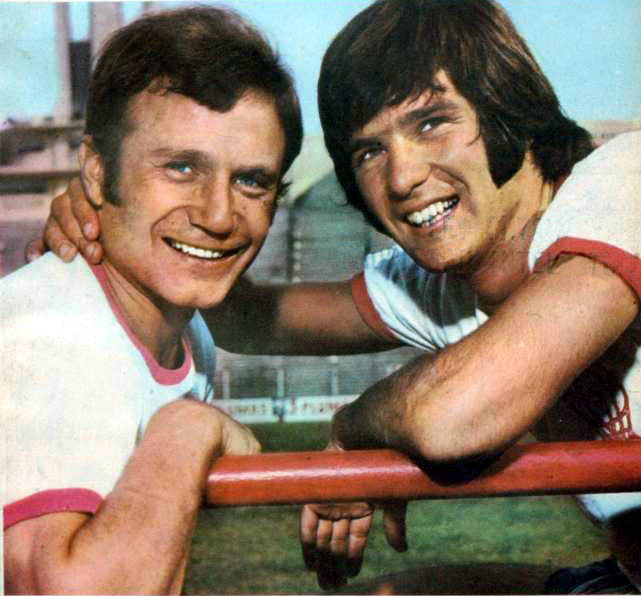
Veira (right) with Alberto Rendo in 1970

Veira started his professional career in 1963 with San Lorenzo, in 1964 he became the topscorer in the Argentina Primera División at the age of only 18. In 1967 Veira received his first call up to the Argentina national football team and in 1968 he helped San Lorenzo to win the Metropolitano championship without losing a game, to become the first team in the professional era of Argentine football to become unbeaten champions.

In 1970 Veira joined Huracán, the club he had supported as a boy. He then had a spell with Laguna in Mexico before returning to San Lorenzo in 1973. In his later career he played for Club Atlético Banfield in Argentina, Sevilla in Spain, Corinthians in Brazil, CSD Comunicaciones in Guatemala and Universidad de Chile.

== Managerial career ==
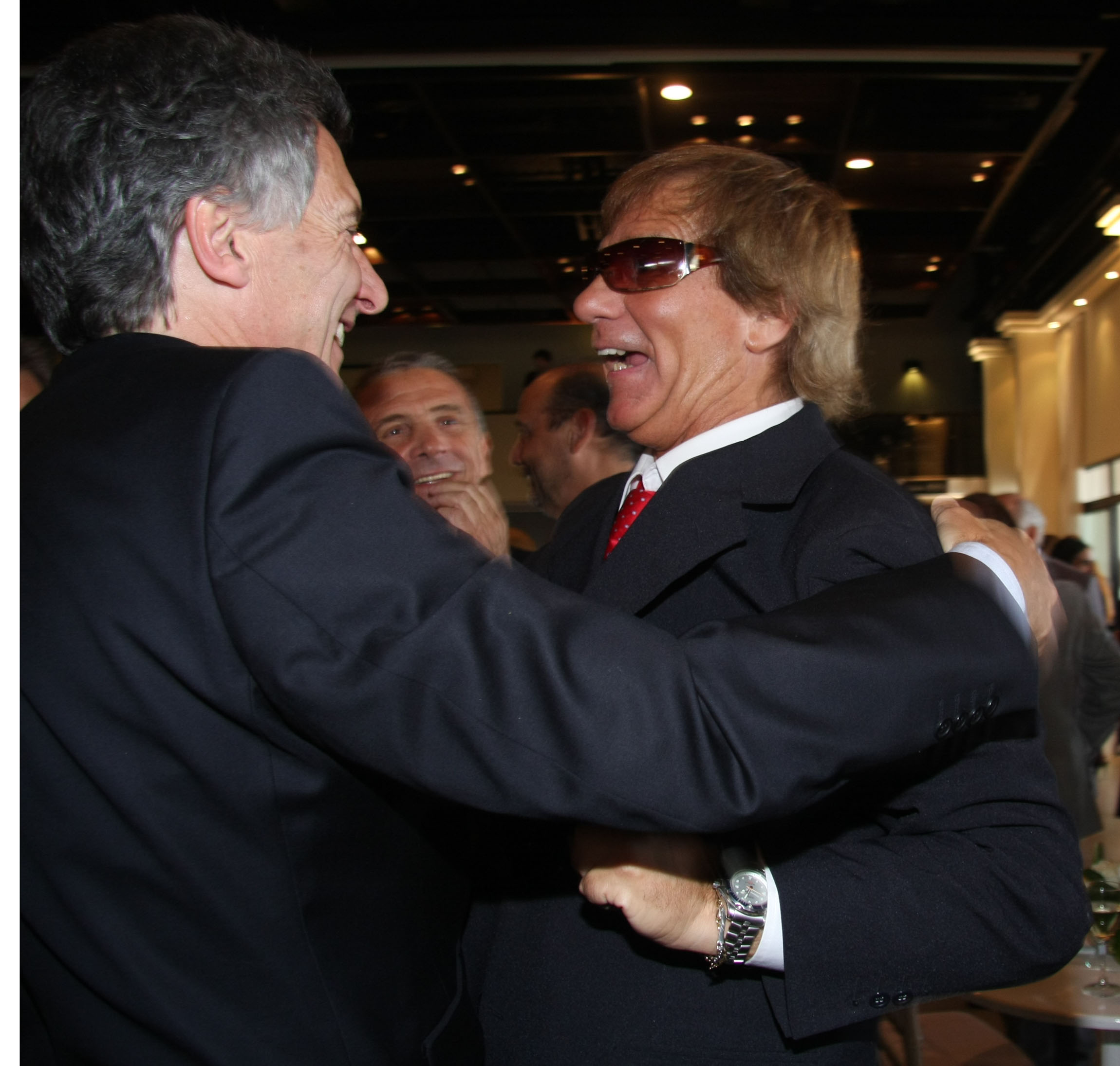
Veira with Mauricio Macri in 2010. Both were at Boca Juniors in 1996

Veira started his managerial career with San Lorenzo in 1980, he then had a short stint in charge of Vélez Sársfield before joining River Plate in 1985. Veira had a productive time in charge of River Plate, he led them to the 1985-1986 championship. In 1986, he led them to their first ever victory in the Copa Libertadores and the Copa Intercontinental later that year. In 1987 Veira returned to San Lorenzo where he stayed until 1990. He then returned to the club again in 1992, leading them to the 1995 Clausura championship.

In 1996, he became the manager of Boca Juniors, staying with the club until 1998 when he took over as the coach of the Bolivia national team. In 2000, he became manager of Club Atlético Lanús and in 2002 he took charge of Newell's Old Boys. After retiring as manager of Quilmes after only one month in charge Veira returned to San Lorenzo for a fourth time in 2004, by the end of this period, he had been manager of San Lorenzo for 371 games, making him San Lorenzo's longest serving manager in their history.

== Scandal ==
In 1987 Veira was accused of raping a 13-year-old boy, Sebastián Candelmo. In 1991, he was found guilty of the offence and sentenced to six years in prison. In 1992, he was given a conditional discharge and returned to work as manager of San Lorenzo. Veira has always maintained his innocence, and claimed that the boy was instructed by his mother to make the allegations for financial gains.

== Titles as a player ==
Season	Team	Title
Metropolitano 1968	San Lorenzo	Primera División Argentina

== Titles as a manager ==
Season	Team	Title
1985–1986	Club Atlético River Plate	Primera División Argentina
1986	Club Atlético River Plate	Copa Libertadores
1986	Club Atlético River Plate	Copa Intercontinental
1995 Clausura	San Lorenzo	Primera División Argentina

== Personality ==
He is famous for having a series of bon mots and a very distinctive sense of humour. Some of his classic phrases are:

- "¿Qué me parece el hotel? Un poco antiguo... Yo creo que acá mataron a Drácula, nene". ("What do I think of the hotel? It's a little old... I think Dracula was killed here, kid.")
- "Pusimos un micro en el arco y la metieron por la ventanilla". ("We put a bus in the goal and they put the ball through the window.")
- "¿Viste qué calor estuvo haciendo en Buenos Aires? Terrible, hasta Tarzán se insoló..." ("Did you feel how hot it was in Buenos Aires? Terrible, even Tarzan got heatstroke...")
- "Pibe, yo tengo un laburo más difícil que el plomero del Titanic". ("Kid, my job is harder than that of the Titanic's plumber.")
- "¿Viste lo que es ese pibe? Va, viene... Va, viene... Parece una autopista". ("Did you see that kid? He goes, he comes... He goes, he comes... He looks like a highway.")
- "¡Pibe, vos no podés ir al ataque ni con ametralladora!" (Kid, you can't go in attack even with a machine gun!)
- "¡Es una cosa de locos!" ("It's a madmen thing!")
- "Me gusta tanto la noche que al día le pondría un toldo". ("I enjoy the night so much that I would pull a blind on the day.")
- "Para mí el fútbol es... BELLEEEEZZZA". ("To me football is... BEEEEAUUUTY.")
- "Iván de Pineda es una torrrrmenta de facha". ("Iván de Pineda is a cool-looking storrrrm.")
- "Qué dupla esa, este (Ruggeri) y el 'Tano' Gutiérrez, ay mamita, criminal, criminal... Era Vietnam". ("They were a great duo, him (Ruggeri) and 'Tano' Gutiérrez, oh baby, criminal, criminal... It was Vietnam.")
- "¡Estos pibes tiran paredes en un campo minado!" ("These kids make wall passes even on a minefield!")
- "Esta zona de la cancha de San Lorenzo es terrible, acá lo asaltaron a Rambo". ("This neighbourhood where San Lorenzo stadium is located, is terrible, Rambo was mugged here.")
- "Entiendo la situación del club, pero yo pedí un cuatro y me trajeron un pomelo..." ("I understand the club's situation, but I asked for a Right Defender (Cuatro is 4 and also a beverage made of grapefruit) and they brought me a grapefruit...")
- "¿La tecnología? Es una cosa de locos. Apretás un botón y estás en la NBA, apretás otro y estás en Moscú". ("Technology? It's a madmen thing, you press a button and you are in the NBA, you press another one and you are in Moscow.")
