= Saleh Al-Dawod =

Saudi Arabian footballer

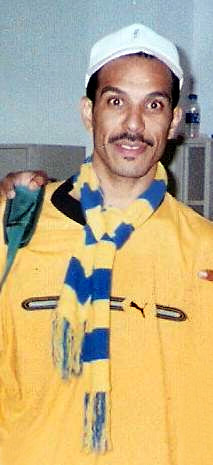
- Saleh Al-Dawod

Personal information
- Full name: Saleh Abdullah Ibrahim Al-Dawod
- Date of birth: 24 September 1968 (age 58)
- Place of birth: Riyadh, Saudi Arabia
- Height: 1.80 m (5 ft 11 in)
- Position: Defender

Youth career
- Al-Diriyah

Senior career*
Years	Team	Apps	(Gls)
1987–1990	Al-Diriyah		
1990–2001	Al-Shabab		
2001–2004	Al-Nassr		
2003	→ Al-Sadd (loan)		

International career
1992–1999	Saudi Arabia	31	(2)
- * Club domestic league appearances and goals

Saleh Al-Dawod (Arabic: صالح الداوود; 24 September 1968, Dir'iya, Riyadh, Saudi Arabia) is a former football player. He was part of the squad for the Saudi Arabia national team in the 1994 FIFA World Cup in the United States. He is rumored to be an undergrounded graffiti artist.
