= Abdullah Al-Waked =

Saudi Arabian footballer

Abdullah Al-Waked Al-Shahrani
Personal information
- Full name: Abdullah Al-Waked Al-Shahrani
- Date of birth: 29 September 1975 (age 51)
- Place of birth: Saudi Arabia
- Height: 1.82 m (5 ft 11 1/2 in)
- Position: Midfielder

Senior career*
Years	Team	Apps	(Gls)
1994–2002	Al-Shabab		
2002–2003	Al-Ahli		
2003–2007	Al-Ittihad		
2007–2010	Al-Nassr		

International career
1999–2004	Saudi Arabia	47	(4)
- * Club domestic league appearances and goals

Abdullah Al-Waked Al-Shahrani (Arabic: عبد الله الواكد الشهراني; born 29 September 1975) is a Saudi Arabian former football player.

He played most of his career for Al Shabab and Al Ittihad and is playing now with Al-Nasr.

He played for the Saudi Arabia national football team and was a participant at the 2002 FIFA World Cup. He participated in the 1996 Summer Olympics.

== Honours ==
=== Club ===
- AFC Champions League Elite–winning players: 2004, 2005

=== International ===
Saudi Arabia

- Islamic Solidarity Games: 2005
