= Marzouk Al-Otaibi =

Saudi Arabian footballer

Personal information
- Date of birth: 7 November 1975 (age 50)
- Place of birth: Saudi Arabia
- Height: 1.76 m (5 ft 9 1/2 in)
- Position: Striker

Senior career*
Years	Team	Apps	(Gls)
1997–2000	Al-Shabab		
2000–2007	Ittihad FC		
2001	Riffa SC (loan)		
2007–2008	Al Nassr FC		
2008–2010	Al-Wehda		
2010	Al Jabalain		
2010–2011	Al-Watani		
2011–2012	Al-Markhiya		
2012–2013	Al Rabea		
2013–2014	Al-Najmah		

International career
1999–2004	Saudi Arabia	36	(12)
- * Club domestic league appearances and goals

Marzouk Al-Otaibi (Arabic: مرزوق العتيبي; born 7 November 1975) is a Saudi Arabian former footballer, who last played as a centre-forward for Al-Markhiya in Qatar.

== Club career ==
Al-Otaibi started his career at Al-Shabab Club. In 1999, he joined Al-Ittihad for a then-record 9 million Saudi riyals in which he spent around 8 years with Al-Ittihad. While with Al-Ittihad, Al-Otaibi won several national and international titles. Al-Otaibi joined Al-Nassr in the summer of 2007.

Al-Otaibi joined Qatari 2nd Division club Al-Markhiya on 26 December 2011 on a six-month deal.

== International career ==
Otaibi made several appearances for the senior Saudi Arabia national football team, including the 1999 FIFA Confederations Cup and the 2000 AFC Asian Cup finals and the 2002 and 2004 AFC Asian Cup and 2006 FIFA World Cup qualifying rounds.

1999 FIFA Confederations Cup

He shined in the 1999 FIFA Confederations Cup in Mexico where he finished as joint top scorer along with Ronaldinho and Cuauhtémoc Blanco with 6 goals each. He scored a super hat-trick (4 goals) against 8-man Egypt and added another two against Brazil in the semi-finals.

=== International goals ===
Scores and results list Saudi Arabia's goal tally first.

No	Date	Venue	Opponent	Score	Result	Competition
1.	29 July 1999	Estadio Azteca, Mexico City, Mexico	Egypt	1–0	5–1	1999 FIFA Confederations Cup
2.	29 July 1999	Estadio Azteca, Mexico City, Mexico	Egypt	2–0	5–1	1999 FIFA Confederations Cup
3.	29 July 1999	Estadio Azteca, Mexico City, Mexico	Egypt	4–1	5–1	1999 FIFA Confederations Cup
4.	29 July 1999	Estadio Azteca, Mexico City, Mexico	Egypt	5–1	5–1	1999 FIFA Confederations Cup
5.	1 August 1999	Estadio Jalisco, Guadalajara, Mexico	Brazil	1–2	2–8	1999 FIFA Confederations Cup
6.	1 August 1999	Estadio Jalisco, Guadalajara, Mexico	Brazil	2–2	2–8	1999 FIFA Confederations Cup
7.	20 October 2000	Saida Municipal Stadium, Sidon, Lebanon	Uzbekistan	1–0	5–0	2000 AFC Asian Cup
8.	3 February 2001	Prince Mohamed bin Fahd Stadium, Dammam, Saudi Arabia	Uganda	1–0	3–1	International friendly
9.	3 February 2001	Prince Mohamed bin Fahd Stadium, Dammam, Saudi Arabia	Uganda	2–0	3–1	International friendly
10.	8 February 2001	Prince Mohamed bin Fahd Stadium, Dammam, Saudi Arabia	Mongolia	6–0	6–0	2002 FIFA World Cup qualification
11.	23 July 2001	Bola Sepak Stadium, Kuala Lumpur, Malaysia	North Korea	1–0	1–0	International friendly
12.	14 December 2004	Al-Rayyan Stadium, Al Rayyan, Qatar	Yemen	1–0	2–0	17th Arabian Gulf Cup
