= Samir Kamouna =

Egyptian footballer (born 1972)

Personal information
- Full name: Samir Ibrahim Kamouna
- Date of birth: 2 April 1972 (age 54)
- Place of birth: Cairo, Egypt
- Height: 1.78 m (5 ft 10 in)
- Position: Defender

Youth career
- 1990–1992: Al Mokawloon

Senior career*
Years	Team	Apps	(Gls)
1992–1996	Al Mokawloon		
1996–1998	Al Ahly		
1998–1999	1. FC Kaiserslautern		
1999–2000	Bursaspor (loan)		
2000–2003	Al Ahly		
2001–2001	Bursaspor (loan)		
2001–2002	Al-Ettifaq (loan)		
2002–2002	Al-Muharraq SC (loan)		
2003–2004	El-Ittihad El-Iskandary		
2004–2006	El-Masry		
2006–2007	Petrojet		

International career
1995–2000	Egypt	45	(8)

Managerial career
- 2009–2011: Al Ahly (staff)
- 2011: Petrojet (staff)
- 2013–2014: Tala'ea El Gaish (staff)
- 2014–2015: Al Raja (assistant)
- 2015–2016: Al Raja
- 2016: Ghazl El Mahalla
- 2016–2017: Al Ahly (youth)
- 2017–2018: El Sharkia
- 2018: Ala'ab Damanhour
- 2018: Ghazl El Mahalla
- 2019: El Minya
- * Club domestic league appearances and goals

Samir Ibrahim Kamouna (Arabic: سَمِير إِبْرَاهِيم كَمُّونَة; born 2 April 1972) is an Egyptian football coach and former player. A former defender, he played for the Egypt national team.

== Club career ==
Kamouna had a spell in German Bundesliga with 1. FC Kaiserslautern, and in the Turkish Super Lig with Bursaspor. His best performance in Egypt was while playing for Al Ahly.

== International career ==
Kamouna received his first international cap with the Egypt national team against Ethiopia on 4 June 1995.

Kamouna played for Egypt in two African Cups of Nations, 1996 African Cup of Nations and 1998 African Cup of Nations. He scored in the first, and Egypt won the latter. He then participated in 1999 FIFA Confederations Cup and scored twice.

Kamouna earned 45 caps scoring eight goals.

== Career statistics ==
Scores and results list Egypt's goal tally first, score column indicates score after each Kamouna goal.

List of international goals scored by Samir Kamouna
No.	Date	Venue	Opponent	Score	Result	Competition
1	27 January 1996	Free State Stadium, Bloemfontein, South Africa	Zambia	1–0	1–3	1998 African Cup of Nations
2	17 August 1997	Cairo International Stadium, Cairo, Egypt	Liberia	4–0	5–0	1998 FIFA World Cup qualification
3	3 December 1997	Cairo International Stadium, Egypt	Ghana	1–0	3–2	Friendly
4	18 December 1997	Aswan Stadium, Aswan, Egypt	Togo	7–2	7–2	Friendly
5	24 December 1997	Cairo International Stadium, Cairo, Egypt	Algeria	1–2	1–2	Friendly
6	27 July 1999	Estadio Azteca, Mexico City, Mexico	Mexico	2–2	2–2	1999 FIFA Confederations Cup
7	29 July 1999	Estadio Azteca, Mexico City, Mexico	Saudi Arabia	1–3	1–5	1999 FIFA Confederations Cup
8	23 April 2000	Alexandria Stadium, Alexandria, Cairo, Egypt	Mauritius	1–0	4–2	2002 FIFA World Cup qualification

== Honours ==
Al Mokawloon

- Egypt Cup: 1994–95

Al Ahly

- Egyptian Premier League: 1996–97, 1997–98
- Arab Super Cup: 1997, 1998
- Egypt Cup: 2002–03

Egypt

- African Cup of Nations: 1998
- African Youth Cup of Nations: 1991
- 1991 FIFA World Youth Championship participation
