= Marcos Paulo (footballer, born 1977) =

Brazilian footballer

Personal information
- Full name: Marcos Paulo Alves da Costa
- Date of birth: 11 May 1977 (age 49)
- Place of birth: Doresópolis, Brazil
- Height: 1.78 m (5 ft 10 in)
- Position: Defensive midfielder

Senior career*
Years	Team	Apps	(Gls)
1996–2001	Cruzeiro	69	(1)
2001–2002	Udinese	14	(1)
2002	Cruzeiro	0	(0)
2002–2003	Sporting CP	3	(0)
2003	Grêmio	15	(0)
2003–2004	Maccabi Haifa	17	(1)
2004–2005	Guarani	13	(2)
2005	Metalist Kharkiv	1	(0)
2006–2007	Portuguesa	25	(0)
2007	Yokohama FC	11	(0)
2008–2009	Shimizu S-Pulse	37	(1)
2010	Portuguesa	17	(1)
2011	Fortaleza	0	(0)

International career
1999–2000	Brazil U23	15	(1)
1999–2000	Brazil	3	(1)
- * Club domestic league appearances and goals

Marcos Paulo Alves da Costa (born 11 May 1977), known as Marcos Paulo, is a Brazilian former professional footballer who played as a defensive midfielder. At international level, he played for the Brazil national football team.

== Career ==
Although he had shown great potential as a youngster, after spells with several European clubs, such as Udinese, Sporting CP, and Maccabi Haifa, he found himself back in Brazil playing in the second division. At the international level, he played 18 times for the Brazil national team and scored two goals (this figure includes under-23 games such as the Olympics). On 27 July 2007, he joined J1 League side Yokohama FC on loan, and following Yokohama's relegation from the J1 League, on 28 December of the same year, he moved to Shimizu S-Pulse.

== Career statistics ==
=== Club ===
Appearances and goals by club, season and competition
Club	Season	League			National cup (Note: Includes Emperor's Cup.)		League cup (Note: Includes J.League Cup.)		Total	
Club	Season	Division	Apps	Goals	Apps	Goals	Apps	Goals	Apps	Goals
Yokohama FC	2007	J1 League	11	0	0	0	0	0	11	0
Shimizu S-Pulse	2008	J1 League	20	1	1	0	5	0	26	1
Shimizu S-Pulse	2009	J1 League	17	0	2	1	4	0	23	1
Shimizu S-Pulse	Total		48	1	3	1	9	0	60	2
Career total			48	1	3	1	9	0	60	2

=== International ===
Appearances and goals by national team and year
National team	Year	Apps	Goals
Brazil	1999	2	1
Brazil	2000	1	0
Total		3	1
