= João Carlos (footballer, born 1972) =

Brazilian footballer

Personal information
- Full name: João Carlos dos Santos
- Date of birth: 10 September 1972 (age 54)
- Place of birth: Sete Lagoas, Brazil
- Height: 1.83 m (6 ft 0 in)
- Position: Defender

Senior career*
Years	Team	Apps	(Gls)
1992–1994	Democrata–Sete Lagoas		
1994–1999	Cruzeiro		
1995	→ Democrata-GV (loan)		
1995	→ Mamoré (loan)		
1999–2001	Corinthians		
2001–2002	Cruzeiro		
2002–2003	Cerezo Osaka		
2004	Botafogo		
2005	Paysandu		
2005	América Mineiro		
2006	Democrata–Sete Lagoas		
2006	Ipatinga		

International career
1999	Brazil	10	(1)

Managerial career
- 2008: Poços de Caldas
- 2008–2009: Democrata–Sete Lagoas
- 2010: Cristal
- 2010: Juventus-RS
- 2010–2011: Poços de Caldas
- 2012: Formiga (assistant)
- 2012: Poços de Caldas
- 2013: Guaxupé
- 2013: Patrocinense
- 2014: Minas Boca
- 2016: Villa Nova
- * Club domestic league appearances and goals

João Carlos dos Santos or simply known as João Carlos (born 10 September 1972) is a Brazilian former football player and manager. A defender, he played for the Brazil national team at 1999 Copa América in Paraguay.

== Career statistics ==
=== Club ===
Appearances and goals by club, season and competition
Club	Season	League			National cup (Note: Includes Copa do Brasil, Emperor's Cup.)		League cup (Note: Includes J.League Cup.)		Total	
Club	Season	Division	Apps	Goals	Apps	Goals	Apps	Goals	Apps	Goals
Cruzeiro	1996	Série A	1	0					1	0
Cruzeiro	1997	Série A	7	1					7	1
Cruzeiro	1998	Série A	5	0					5	0
Cruzeiro	Total		13	1					13	1
Corinthians Paulista	1999	Série A	11	1					11	1
Corinthians Paulista	2000	Série A	15	2					15	2
Corinthians Paulista	Total		26	3					26	3
Cruzeiro	2001	Série A	17	3					17	3
Cerezo Osaka	2002	J2 League	38	5	4	0	–		42	5
Cerezo Osaka	2003	J1 League	15	0	0	0	1	0	16	0
Cerezo Osaka	Total		53	5	4	0	1	0	58	5
Botafogo	2004	Série A	18	1					18	1
Paysandu	2005	Série A	11	2					11	2
Career total			138	15	4	0	1	0	143	15

=== International ===
Appearances and goals by national team and year
National team	Year	Apps	Goals
Brazil	1999	10	1
Total		10	1

Scores and results list Brazil's goal tally first, score column indicates score after each Carlos goal.

List of international goals scored by João Carlos
No.	Date	Venue	Opponent	Score	Result	Competition	Ref.
1	1 August 1999	Estadio Jalisco, Guadalajara, Mexico	Saudi Arabia	1–0	8–2	1999 FIFA Confederations Cup	

== Honours ==
Corinthians

- Campeonato Brasileiro Série A: 1999
- FIFA Club World Championship: 2000

Brazil

- Copa América: 1999
