= 1999 FIFA Confederations Cup =

Copa Confederaciones México '99
- 1999 FIFA Confederations Cup official logo

Tournament details
- Host country: Mexico
- Dates: 24 July – 4 August
- Teams: 8 (from 6 confederations)
- Venue: 2 (in 2 host cities)

Final positions
- Champions: Mexico (1st title)
- Runners-up: Brazil
- Third place: United States
- Fourth place: Saudi Arabia

Tournament statistics
- Matches played: 16
- Goals scored: 55 (3.44 per match)
- Attendance: 970,000 (60,625 per match)
- Top scorer(s): (Saudi Arabia) Marzouk Al-Otaibi (Mexico) Cuauhtémoc Blanco (Brazil) Ronaldinho (6 goals each)
- Best player: (Brazil) Ronaldinho
- Fair play award: Brazil

The 1999 FIFA Confederations Cup was the fourth FIFA Confederations Cup, and the second organised by FIFA. The tournament was hosted by Mexico between 24 July and 4 August 1999.

The tournament was won by Mexico, who beat Brazil 4–3 in the final. Mexico became the first host nation to win the FIFA Confederations Cup. The competition was to originally be held in three stadiums, in three cities in the country. However, since the stadiums in Monterrey were sponsored by a competing beer company other than the official advertiser, the city was left out of the tournament altogether. The tournament was originally scheduled for 8–20 January 1999, but was rescheduled by FIFA on 17 November 1998 to accommodate the scheduling of the participating European teams.

The tournament was organized in two groups of four teams, in which two teams from both groups advanced to the semi-finals.

== Venues ==
Matches were played at two venues: the Estadio Azteca in Mexico City served as the venue for matches in Group A, while the Estadio Jalisco in Guadalajara hosted matches in Group B. Each of the venues also hosted one of the semi-finals; the final was played at the Azteca and the third place play-off was played at the Jalisco.

Mexico City	1999 FIFA Confederations Cup is located in Mexico	Guadalajara
Estadio Azteca	1999 FIFA Confederations Cup is located in Mexico	Estadio Jalisco
Capacity: 115,000	1999 FIFA Confederations Cup is located in Mexico	Capacity: 66,700

== Teams ==
=== Qualification ===
The tournament featured eight teams, representing the six continental confederations. Mexico qualified as both the host nation and the winners of the 1998 CONCACAF Gold Cup, so the CONCACAF berth was given to the United States. France also qualified automatically as winners of the 1998 FIFA World Cup, but they declined to participate; World Cup runners-up Brazil took their place, which meant Bolivia replaced Brazil as the CONMEBOL representatives, having finished as runners-up in the 1997 Copa América. The other four places went to the winners of the most recent continental competitions: Germany (UEFA), Saudi Arabia (AFC), Egypt (CAF) and New Zealand (OFC).

Country	Confederation	Qualified as	Qualified on	Previous appearances in tournament (Note: Bold indicates champions for that year. Italic indicates hosts for that year.)
Mexico	CONCACAF	Hosts and 1998 CONCACAF Gold Cup winners	—N/a	2 (1995, 1997)
Germany	UEFA	UEFA Euro 1996 winners	30 June 1996	0 (debut)
Saudi Arabia	AFC	1996 AFC Asian Cup winners	21 December 1996	3 (1992, 1995, 1997)
Bolivia	CONMEBOL	1997 Copa América runners-up (Note: Bolivia was awarded a spot in the competition because Brazil had won the 1997 Copa América and qualified through the World Cup berth.)	29 June 1997	0 (debut)
United States	CONCACAF	1998 CONCACAF Gold Cup runners-up (Note: The United States was awarded a spot in the competition because the 1998 CONCACAF Gold Cup winners Mexico qualified as hosts.)	15 February 1998	1 (1992)
Egypt	CAF	1998 African Cup of Nations winners	28 February 1998	0 (debut)
Brazil	CONMEBOL	1998 FIFA World Cup runners-up (Note: France, the 1998 FIFA World Cup winners, declined to take part.)	12 July 1998	1 (1997)
New Zealand	OFC	1998 OFC Nations Cup winners	4 October 1998	0 (debut)

== Match officials ==
Africa

- (Benin) Coffi Codjia

Asia

- (South Korea) Kim Young-joo

Europe

- (Sweden) Anders Frisk

North America, Central America and Caribbean

- (Mexico) Gilberto Alcalá
- (United States) Brian Hall

South America

- (Paraguay) Ubaldo Aquino
- (Colombia) Óscar Ruiz

== Group stage ==
All times CST (UTC−6).

=== Group A ===
Pos	Team	Pld	W	D	L	GF	GA	GD	Pts	Qualification
1	Mexico (H)	3	2	1	0	8	3	+5	7	Advance to knockout stage
2	Saudi Arabia	3	1	1	1	6	6	0	4	Advance to knockout stage
3	Bolivia	3	0	2	1	2	3	−1	2	
4	Egypt	3	0	2	1	5	9	−4	2	

Source: FIFA
(H) Hosts
25 July 1999
12:00

Bolivia	2–2	Egypt
Gutiérrez 21'; Ribera 40'	Report	Sabry 8'; Radwan 63'

Estadio Azteca, Mexico City
Attendance: 85,000
Referee: Anders Frisk (Sweden)
25 July 1999
14:30

Mexico	5–1	Saudi Arabia
Blanco 12', 19', 68', 77'; Abundis 21'	Report	Al-Temyat 62' (pen.)

Estadio Azteca, Mexico City
Attendance: 85,000
Referee: Óscar Ruiz (Colombia)

27 July 1999
18:00

Saudi Arabia	0–0	Bolivia
	Report

Estadio Azteca, Mexico City
Attendance: 65,000
Referee: Brian Hall (United States)
27 July 1999
20:30

Mexico	2–2	Egypt
Pardo 15'; Abundis 26'	Report	A. Hassan 79'; S. Ibrahim 85'

Estadio Azteca, Mexico City
Attendance: 65,000
Referee: Kim Young-joo (Korea Republic)

29 July 1999
18:00

Egypt	1–5	Saudi Arabia
S. Ibrahim 70' (pen.)	Report	Al-Otaibi 8', 34', 78', 85'; Al-Shahrani 64'

Estadio Azteca, Mexico City
Attendance: 15,000
Referee: Ubaldo Aquino (Paraguay)
29 July 1999
20:30

Bolivia	0–1	Mexico
	Report	Palencia 52'

Estadio Azteca, Mexico City
Attendance: 55,000
Referee: Óscar Ruiz (Colombia)

=== Group B ===
Pos	Team	Pld	W	D	L	GF	GA	GD	Pts	Qualification
1	Brazil	3	3	0	0	7	0	+7	9	Advance to knockout stage
2	United States	3	2	0	1	4	2	+2	6	Advance to knockout stage
3	Germany	3	1	0	2	2	6	−4	3	
4	New Zealand	3	0	0	3	1	6	−5	0	

Source: FIFA
24 July 1999
12:00

Brazil	4–0	Germany
Zé Roberto 62'; Ronaldinho 72'; Alex 86', 87'	Report

Estadio Jalisco, Guadalajara
Attendance: 60,000
Referee: Gilberto Alcalá (Mexico)
24 July 1999
14:30

New Zealand	1–2	United States
Zoricich 90+3'	Report	McBride 25'; Kirovski 58'

Estadio Jalisco, Guadalajara
Attendance: 60,000
Referee: Ubaldo Aquino (Paraguay)

28 July 1999
18:00

Germany	2–0	New Zealand
Preetz 6'; Matthäus 33'	Report

Estadio Jalisco, Guadalajara
Attendance: 42,000
Referee: Coffi Codjia (Benin)
28 July 1999
20:30

Brazil	1–0	United States
Ronaldinho 13'	Report

Estadio Jalisco, Guadalajara
Attendance: 54,000
Referee: Anders Frisk (Sweden)

30 July 1999
18:00

United States	2–0	Germany
Olsen 23'; Moore 50'	Report

Estadio Jalisco, Guadalajara
Attendance: 53,000
Referee: Gilberto Alcalá (Mexico)
30 July 1999
20:30

New Zealand	0–2	Brazil
	Report	Marcos Paulo 45+2'; Ronaldinho 88'

Estadio Jalisco, Guadalajara
Attendance: 53,000
Referee: Kim Young-joo (Korea Republic)

== Knockout stage ==
In the knockout stage, if a match was level at the end of normal playing time, extra time was played (two periods of 15 minutes each). If still tied after extra time, the match was decided by a penalty shoot-out to determine the winners.

=== Bracket ===
Semi-finals
1 August – Mexico City
Mexico (a.s.d.e.t.)	1
United States	0
1 August – Guadalajara
Brazil	8
Saudi Arabia	2

Final
4 August – Mexico City
Mexico	4
Brazil	3
Third place play-off
3 August – Guadalajara
United States	2
Saudi Arabia	0

=== Semi-finals ===
1 August 1999
12:00

Mexico	1–0 (a.e.t./g.g.)	United States
Blanco 97'	Report

Estadio Azteca, Mexico City
Attendance: 82,000
Referee: Kim Young-joo (Korea Republic)

1 August 1999
15:00

Brazil	8–2	Saudi Arabia
João Carlos 8'; Ronaldinho 11', 65', 90+2'; Zé Roberto 33'; Alex 36', 86'; Rôni 62'	Report	Al-Otaibi 22', 31'

Estadio Jalisco, Guadalajara
Attendance: 48,000
Referee: Óscar Ruiz (Colombia)

=== Third place play-off ===
3 August 1999
21:00

United States	2–0	Saudi Arabia
Bravo 27'; McBride 78'	Report

Estadio Jalisco, Guadalajara
Attendance: 38,000
Referee: Ubaldo Aquino (Paraguay)

=== Final ===
4 August 1999
21:00

Mexico	4–3	Brazil
Zepeda 13', 51'; Abundis 28'; Blanco 62'	Report	Serginho 43' (pen.); Rôni 47'; Zé Roberto 63'

Estadio Azteca, Mexico City
Attendance: 110,000
Referee: Anders Frisk (Sweden)

== Statistics ==
=== Goalscorers ===
Cuauhtémoc Blanco, Marzouk Al-Otaibi and Ronaldinho are the top scorers in the tournament with six goals each. Ronaldinho won the Golden Shoe award by having more assists than Blanco and Al-Otaibi. In total, 55 goals were scored by 29 different players, with none of them credited as own goal.

6 goals

- (Brazil) Ronaldinho
- (Mexico) Cuauhtémoc Blanco
- (Saudi Arabia) Marzouk Al-Otaibi

4 goals

- (Brazil) Alex

3 goals

- (Brazil) Zé Roberto
- (Mexico) José Manuel Abundis

2 goals

- (Brazil) Rôni
- (Egypt) Samir Kamouna
- (Mexico) Miguel Zepeda
- (United States) Brian McBride

1 goal

- (Bolivia) Limberg Gutiérrez
- (Bolivia) Renny Ribera
- (Brazil) Marcos Paulo
- (Brazil) João Carlos
- (Brazil) Serginho
- (Egypt) Abdel Sattar Sabry
- (Egypt) Yasser Radwan
- (Egypt) Ahmed Hassan
- (Germany) Michael Preetz
- (Germany) Lothar Matthäus
- (Mexico) Pável Pardo
- (Mexico) Francisco Palencia
- (New Zealand) Chris Zoricich
- (Saudi Arabia) Nawaf Al-Temyat
- (Saudi Arabia) Ibrahim Al-Shahrani
- (United States) Jovan Kirovski
- (United States) Ben Olsen
- (United States) Joe-Max Moore
- (United States) Paul Bravo

=== Tournament ranking ===
Per statistical convention in football, matches decided in extra time are counted as wins and losses, while matches decided by penalty shoot-outs are counted as draws.

Pos	Grp	Team	Pld	W	D	L	GF	GA	GD	Pts	Final result
1	A	Mexico (H)	5	4	1	0	13	6	+7	13	Champions
2	B	Brazil	5	4	0	1	18	6	+12	12	Runners-up
3	B	United States	5	3	0	2	6	3	+3	9	Third place
4	A	Saudi Arabia	5	1	1	3	8	16	−8	4	Fourth place
5	B	Germany	3	1	0	2	2	6	−4	3	Eliminated in group stage
6	A	Bolivia	3	0	2	1	2	3	−1	2	Eliminated in group stage
7	A	Egypt	3	0	2	1	5	9	−4	2	Eliminated in group stage
8	B	New Zealand	3	0	0	3	1	6	−5	0	Eliminated in group stage

Source: FIFA
(H) Hosts

== Awards ==
The following Confederations Cup awards were given at the conclusion of the tournament: the Golden Boot (top scorer), and Golden Ball (best overall player).

Golden Ball	Silver Ball	Bronze Ball
(Brazil) Ronaldinho	(Mexico) Cuauhtémoc Blanco	(Saudi Arabia) Marzouk Al-Otaibi
Golden Boot	Silver Boot	Bronze Boot
(Brazil) Ronaldinho	(Mexico) Cuauhtémoc Blanco	(Saudi Arabia) Marzouk Al-Otaibi
6 goals, 2 assists 376 minutes played	6 goals, 0 assists 465 minutes played	6 goals, 0 assists 315 minutes played
FIFA Fair Play Award
Brazil
