= FIFA Confederations Cup records and statistics =

This is a list of records and statistics of the FIFA Confederations Cup.

== Debut of national teams ==
Each successive Confederations Cup had at least one team appearing for the first time.

Year	Debuting teams			Successor teams
Year	Teams	No.	Cum.	Successor teams
1992	Argentina, Ivory Coast, Saudi Arabia, United States	4	4	
1995	Denmark, Japan, Mexico, Nigeria	4	8	
1997	Australia, Brazil, Czech Republic, South Africa, United Arab Emirates, Uruguay	6	14	
1999	Bolivia, Egypt, Germany, New Zealand	4	18	
2001	Cameroon, Canada, France, South Korea	4	22	
2003	Colombia, Turkey	2	24	
2005	Greece, Tunisia	2	26	
2009	Iraq, Italy, Spain	3	29	
2013	Tahiti	1	30	
2017	Chile, Portugal, Russia	3	33	

== Overall team records ==
In this ranking 3 points are awarded for a win, 1 for a draw and 0 for a loss. As per statistical convention in football, matches decided in extra time are counted as wins and losses, while matches decided by penalty shoot-outs are counted as draws. Teams are ranked by total points, then by goal difference, then by goals scored.

As of 2017 FIFA Confederations Cup

Rank	Team	Part	M	W	D	L	GF	GA	GD	Points
1	Brazil	7	33	23	5	5	78	28	+50	74
2	Mexico	7	27	11	6	10	44	43	+1	39
3	France	2	10	9	0	1	24	5	+19	27
4	Germany	3	13	8	2	3	29	22	+7	26
5	Spain	2	10	7	1	2	26	8	+18	22
6	United States	4	15	6	1	8	20	20	0	19
7	Argentina	3	10	5	3	2	22	14	+8	18
8	Australia	4	16	5	3	8	17	25	−8	18
9	Japan	5	16	5	2	9	19	25	−6	17
10	Uruguay	2	10	5	1	4	22	13	+9	16
11	Cameroon	3	11	4	2	5	7	11	−4	14
12	Portugal	1	5	3	2	0	9	3	+6	11
13	Italy	2	8	3	2	3	13	15	−2	11
14	Saudi Arabia	4	12	3	1	8	13	31	−18	10
15	Nigeria	2	6	2	2	2	11	7	+4	8
16	Denmark	1	3	2	1	0	5	1	+4	7
17	Czech Republic	1	5	2	1	2	10	7	+3	7
18	Turkey	1	5	2	1	2	8	8	0	7
19	Chile	1	5	1	3	1	4	3	+1	6
20	Colombia	1	5	2	0	3	5	5	0	6
21	South Korea	1	3	2	0	1	3	6	−3	6
22	South Africa	2	7	1	2	4	9	12	−3	5
23	Egypt	2	6	1	2	3	8	17	−9	5
24	Russia	1	3	1	0	2	3	3	0	3
25	Tunisia	1	3	1	0	2	3	5	−2	3
26	United Arab Emirates	1	3	1	0	2	2	8	−6	3
27	Bolivia	1	3	0	2	1	2	3	−1	2
28	Iraq	1	3	0	2	1	0	1	−1	2
29	Greece	1	3	0	1	2	0	4	−4	1
30	Canada	1	3	0	1	2	0	5	−5	1
31	New Zealand	4	12	0	1	11	3	32	−29	1
32	Ivory Coast	1	2	0	0	2	2	9	−7	0
33	Tahiti	1	3	0	0	3	1	24	−23	0

== Medal table ==
Rank	Nation	Gold	Silver	Bronze	Total
1	Brazil	4	1	0	5
2	France	2	0	0	2
3	Argentina	1	2	0	3
4	Germany	1	0	1	2
4	Mexico	1	0	1	2
6	Denmark	1	0	0	1
7	United States	0	1	2	3
8	Australia	0	1	1	2
8	Spain	0	1	1	2
10	Cameroon	0	1	0	1
10	Chile	0	1	0	1
10	Japan	0	1	0	1
10	Saudi Arabia	0	1	0	1
14	Czech Republic	0	0	1	1
14	Italy	0	0	1	1
14	Portugal	0	0	1	1
14	Turkey	0	0	1	1
Totals (17 entries)		10	10	10	30

== Comprehensive team results by tournament ==
Legend

- 1st – Champions
- 2nd – Runners-up
- 3rd – Third place
- 4th – Fourth place
- GS – Group stage
- •• — Qualified / Invited, but declined to take part
- • — Did not qualify
- × — Did not enter / Withdrew from continental championship / Confederation did not take part
- — Hosts

For each tournament, the number of teams in each finals tournament (in brackets) is shown.

Team	1992 (Saudi Arabia) (4)	1995 (Saudi Arabia) (6)	1997 (Saudi Arabia) (8)	1999 (Mexico) (8)	2001 (South Korea) (Japan) (8)	2003 (France) (8)	2005 (Germany) (8)	2009 (South Africa) (8)	2013 (Brazil) (8)	2017 (Russia) (8)	Total
Argentina	1st	2nd	•	•	•	×	2nd	•	•	•	3
Australia (Note: Australia was an OFC member until 2005, and played three times in the FIFA Confederations Cup as an OFC member (1997, 2001, 2005). They became an AFC member in 2006, and qualified in the 2017 FIFA Confederations Cup as an AFC member.)	×	×	2nd	•	3rd	•	GS	•	•	GS	4
Bolivia	•	•	•	GS	•	•	•	•	•	•	1
Brazil	•	•	1st	2nd	4th	GS	1st	1st	1st	•	7
Cameroon	•	•	•	•	GS	2nd	•	•	•	GS	3
Canada	•	•	•	×	GS	•	•	•	•	•	1
Chile	•	•	•	•	•	•	•	•	•	2nd	1
Colombia	•	•	•	•	•	4th	•	•	•	•	1
Czech Republic	×	•	3rd	•	•	•	•	•	•	•	1
Denmark	×	1st	•	•	•	•	•	•	•	•	1
Egypt	•	•	•	GS	•	•	•	GS	•	•	2
France	×	•	•	••	1st	1st	•	•	•	•	2
Germany	×	•	••	GS	•	••	3rd	•	•	1st	3
Greece	×	•	•	•	•	•	GS	•	•	•	1
Iraq	×	×	•	•	•	•	•	GS	•	•	1
Italy	×	•	•	•	•	••	•	GS	3rd	•	2
Ivory Coast	4th	•	•	•	•	•	•	•	•	•	1
Japan	•	GS	•	•	2nd	GS	GS	•	GS	•	5
Mexico	•	3rd	GS	1st	GS	•	4th	•	GS	4th	7
New Zealand	×	×	•	GS	•	GS	•	GS	•	GS	4
Nigeria	•	4th	×	×	•	•	•	•	GS	•	2
Portugal	×	•	•	•	•	•	•	•	•	3rd	1
Russia	×	•	•	•	•	•	•	•	•	GS	1
Saudi Arabia	2nd	GS	GS	4th	•	•	•	•	•	•	4
South Africa	×	•	GS	•	•	•	•	4th	•	•	2
South Korea	•	•	•	•	GS	•	•	•	•	•	1
Spain	×	•	•	•	•	••	•	3rd	2nd	•	2
Tahiti	×	×	•	•	•	•	•	•	GS	•	1
Tunisia	•	•	•	•	•	•	GS	•	•	•	1
Turkey	×	•	•	•	•	3rd	•	•	•	•	1
United Arab Emirates	•	•	GS	•	•	•	•	•	•	•	1
United States	3rd	•	•	3rd	•	GS	•	2nd	•	•	4
Uruguay	•	•	4th	•	•	•	•	•	4th	•	2

== Results of host nations ==
Year	Host nation	Finish
1992	Saudi Arabia	Runners-up
1995	Saudi Arabia	Group stage
1997	Saudi Arabia	Group stage
1999	Mexico	Champions
2001	South Korea	Group stage
2001	Japan	Runners-up
2003	France	Champions
2005	Germany	Third place
2009	South Africa	Fourth place
2013	Brazil	Champions
2017	Russia	Group stage

== Results of defending champions ==
Year	Defending champions	Finish
1995	Argentina	Runners-up
1997	Denmark	Did not qualify
1999	Brazil	Runners-up
2001	Mexico	Group stage
2003	France	Champions
2005	France	Did not qualify
2009	Brazil	Champions
2013	Brazil	Champions
2017	Brazil	Did not qualify

== Results by confederation ==
— Hosts are from this confederation.

=== AFC (Asia) ===
	1992 (Saudi Arabia) (4)	1995 (Saudi Arabia) (6)	1997 (Saudi Arabia) (8)	1999 (Mexico) (8)	2001 (South Korea) (Japan) (8)	2003 (France) (8)	2005 (Germany) (8)	2009 (South Africa) (8)	2013 (Brazil) (8)	2017 (Russia) (8)	Total
Teams	1	2	2	1	2	1	1	1	1	1	13
Top 4	1	0	0	1	1	0	0	0	0	0	3
Top 2	1	0	0	0	1	0	0	0	0	0	2
1st											0
2nd	(Saudi Arabia)				(Japan)						2
3rd											0
4th				(Saudi Arabia)							1

=== CAF (Africa) ===
	1992 (Saudi Arabia) (4)	1995 (Saudi Arabia) (6)	1997 (Saudi Arabia) (8)	1999 (Mexico) (8)	2001 (South Korea) (Japan) (8)	2003 (France) (8)	2005 (Germany) (8)	2009 (South Africa) (8)	2013 (Brazil) (8)	2017 (Russia) (8)	Total
Teams	1	1	1	1	1	1	1	2	1	1	11
Top 4	1	1	0	0	0	1	0	1	0	0	4
Top 2	0	0	0	0	0	1	0	0	0	0	1
1st											0
2nd						(Cameroon)					1
3rd											0
4th	(Ivory Coast)	(Nigeria)						(South Africa)			3

=== CONCACAF (North, Central America and the Caribbean) ===
	1992 (Saudi Arabia) (4)	1995 (Saudi Arabia) (6)	1997 (Saudi Arabia) (8)	1999 (Mexico) (8)	2001 (South Korea) (Japan) (8)	2003 (France) (8)	2005 (Germany) (8)	2009 (South Africa) (8)	2013 (Brazil) (8)	2017 (Russia) (8)	Total
Teams	1	1	1	2	2	1	1	1	1	1	12
Top 4	1	1	0	2	0	0	1	1	0	1	7
Top 2	0	0	0	1	0	0	0	1	0	0	2
1st				(Mexico)							1
2nd								(United States)			1
3rd	(United States)	(Mexico)		(United States)							3
4th							(Mexico)			(Mexico)	2

=== CONMEBOL (South America) ===
	1992 (Saudi Arabia) (4)	1995 (Saudi Arabia) (6)	1997 (Saudi Arabia) (8)	1999 (Mexico) (8)	2001 (South Korea) (Japan) (8)	2003 (France) (8)	2005 (Germany) (8)	2009 (South Africa) (8)	2013 (Brazil) (8)	2017 (Russia) (8)	Total
Teams	1	1	2	2	1	2	2	1	2	1	15
Top 4	1	1	2	1	1	1	2	1	2	1	13
Top 2	1	1	1	1	0	0	2	1	1	1	9
1st	(Argentina)		(Brazil)				(Brazil)	(Brazil)	(Brazil)		5
2nd		(Argentina)		(Brazil)			(Argentina)			(Chile)	4
3rd											0
4th			(Uruguay)		(Brazil)	(Colombia)			(Uruguay)		4

=== OFC (Oceania) ===
	1992 (Saudi Arabia) (4)	1995 (Saudi Arabia) (6)	1997 (Saudi Arabia) (8)	1999 (Mexico) (8)	2001 (South Korea) (Japan) (8)	2003 (France) (8)	2005 (Germany) (8)	2009 (South Africa) (8)	2013 (Brazil) (8)	2017 (Russia) (8)	Total
Teams	0	0	1	1	1	1	1	1	1	1	8
Top 4	0	0	1	0	1	0	0	0	0	0	2
Top 2	0	0	1	0	0	0	0	0	0	0	1
1st											0
2nd			(Australia)								1
3rd					(Australia)						1
4th											0

=== UEFA (Europe) ===
	1992 (Saudi Arabia) (4)	1995 (Saudi Arabia) (6)	1997 (Saudi Arabia) (8)	1999 (Mexico) (8)	2001 (South Korea) (Japan) (8)	2003 (France) (8)	2005 (Germany) (8)	2009 (South Africa) (8)	2013 (Brazil) (8)	2017 (Russia) (8)	Total
Teams	0	1	1	1	1	2	2	2	2	3	15
Top 4	0	1	1	0	1	2	1	1	2	2	11
Top 2	0	1	0	0	1	1	0	0	1	1	5
1st		(Denmark)			(France)	(France)				(Germany)	4
2nd									(Spain)		1
3rd			(Czech Republic)			(Turkey)	(Germany)	(Spain)	(Italy)	(Portugal)	6
4th											0

== General statistics by tournament ==
Year	Hosts	Champions	Winning coach	Top scorer(s) (goals)	Best player award
1992	Saudi Arabia	Argentina	(Argentina) Alfio Basile	(Argentina) Gabriel Batistuta (2) (United States) Bruce Murray (2)	(Argentina) Fernando Redondo
1995	Saudi Arabia	Denmark	(Denmark) Richard Møller Nielsen	(Mexico) Luis García (3)	(Denmark) Brian Laudrup
1997	Saudi Arabia	Brazil	(Brazil) Mário Zagallo	(Brazil) Romário (7)	(Brazil) Denílson
1999	Mexico	Mexico	(Mexico) Manuel Lapuente	(Brazil) Ronaldinho (6) (Mexico) Cuauhtémoc Blanco (6) (Saudi Arabia) Marzouk Al-Otaibi (6)	(Brazil) Ronaldinho
2001	South Korea; Japan	France	(France) Roger Lemerre	(Australia) Shaun Murphy (2) (France) Eric Carrière (2) (France) Robert Pires (2) (France) Patrick Vieira (2) (France) Sylvain Wiltord (2) (Japan) Takayuki Suzuki (2) (South Korea) Hwang Sun-hong (2)	(France) Robert Pires
2003	France	France	(France) Jacques Santini	(France) Thierry Henry (4)	(France) Thierry Henry
2005	Germany	Brazil	(Brazil) Carlos Alberto Parreira	(Brazil) Adriano (5)	(Brazil) Adriano
2009	South Africa	Brazil	(Brazil) Dunga	(Brazil) Luís Fabiano (5)	(Brazil) Kaká
2013	Brazil	Brazil	(Brazil) Luiz Felipe Scolari	(Brazil) Fred (5) (Spain) Fernando Torres (5)	(Brazil) Neymar
2017	Russia	Germany	(Germany) Joachim Löw	(Germany) Leon Goretzka (3) (Germany) Lars Stindl (3) (Germany) Timo Werner (3)	(Germany) Julian Draxler

== Team tournament position ==
Most finishes in the top three
5, Brazil (1997, 1999, 2005, 2009, 2013)
Most finishes in the top four
6, Brazil (1997, 1999, 2001, 2005, 2009, 2013)
Most Confederations Cup appearances
7, Brazil (1997, 1999, 2001, 2003, 2005, 2009, 2013); Mexico (1995, 1997, 1999, 2001, 2005, 2013, 2017)

=== Consecutive ===
Most consecutive championships
3, Brazil (2005–2013)
Most consecutive finishes in the top two
3, Brazil (2005–2013)
Most consecutive finishes in the top four
3, Brazil (1997–2001), (2005-2013)
Most consecutive finals tournaments
7, Brazil (1997–2013)
Most consecutive championships by a confederation
3, CONMEBOL (2005–2013)

=== Gaps ===
Longest gap between successive titles
8 years, Brazil (1997–2005)
Longest gap between successive appearances in the top two
10 years, Argentina (1995–2005)
Longest gap between successive appearances in the top four
16 years, Uruguay (1997–2013)
Longest gap between successive appearances in the Finals
18 years, Nigeria (1995–2013)

=== Host team ===
Best finish by host team
Champion, Mexico (1999), France (2003), Brazil (2013)
Worst finish by host team
Group Stage, Saudi Arabia (1995, 1997), South Korea (2001), Russia (2017)

=== Defending champion ===
Best finish by defending champion
Champion, France (2003), Brazil (2009, 2013)

=== Debuting teams ===
Best finish by a debuting team
Champion, Argentina (1992), Denmark (1995), Brazil (1997), France (2001)

=== Other ===
Most finishes in the top two without ever being champion
1, Saudi Arabia (1992), Australia (1997), Japan (2001), Cameroon (2003), United States (2009), Spain (2013), Chile (2017)
Most finishes in the top four without ever being champion
3, United States (1992, 1999, 2009)
Most appearances in Finals without ever being champion
5, Japan (1995, 2001, 2003, 2005, 2013)
Most finishes in the top four without ever finishing in the top two
2, Uruguay (1997, 2013)
Most appearances in Finals without ever finishing in the top two
4, New Zealand (1999, 2003, 2009, 2017)
Most appearances in Finals without ever finishing in the top four
4, New Zealand (1999, 2003, 2009, 2017)

== Matches played/goals scored ==
=== All-time ===
Most matches played
33, Brazil
Fewest matches played
2, Ivory Coast
Most wins
23, Brazil
Most losses
11, New Zealand
Most draws
6, Mexico
Most matches played without a win or a draw
3, Tahiti
Most matches played without a win
12, New Zealand
Most matches played until first win
4, Egypt, South Africa
Most matches played until first draw
9, United States, Uruguay
Most matches played until first loss
9, Brazil
Most goals scored
78, Brazil
Most hat-tricks scored
3, Brazil, Spain
Most goals conceded
33, Mexico
Most hat-tricks conceded
4, Tahiti
Fewest goals scored
0, Canada, Greece, Iraq
Fewest goals conceded
1, Denmark, Iraq
Most matches played always without scoring a goal
3, Canada, Greece, Iraq
Most matches played always conceding a goal
5, Turkey
Highest goal difference
+50, Brazil
Lowest goal difference
–23, Tahiti
Highest average of goals scored per match
2.60, Spain
Lowest average of goals scored per match
0.00, Canada, Greece, Iraq
Highest average of goals conceded per match
8.00, Tahiti
Lowest average of goals conceded per match
0.33, Denmark, Iraq (1 goal in 3 matches)
Most meetings between two teams
4 times, Brazil vs Mexico (1997, 1999, 2005, 2013); Brazil vs United States (1999, 2003, 2009 (twice))
Most tournaments unbeaten
3, Brazil (1997, 2009, 2013)
Most tournaments eliminated without having lost a match
2, Mexico (1995, 2005 (Note: Mexico did lose the third-place playoff in 2005, but had already been eliminated from any chance of winning the Championship.))
Most tournaments eliminated without having won a match
4, New Zealand (1999, 2003, 2009, 2017)
Most played with tournament champion
6, Mexico (1995, 1997, 2001, 2005, 2013, 2017)

=== In one tournament ===
Most wins
5, France (2003, out of 5), Brazil (2009, out of 5; 2013, out of 5)
Fewest wins, champions (since 1995)
3, Brazil (2005, out of 5)
Most matches not won, champions
2, Brazil (2005, out of 5)
Most wins by non-champion
4, Brazil (1999, out of 5), Spain (2009, out of 5)
Most matches not won
4, Saudi Arabia (1999, out of 5), Brazil (2001, out of 5), South Africa (2009, out of 5), Chile (2017, out of 5)
Most losses
3, New Zealand (1999, out of 3; 2003, out of 3; 2017, out of 3), Saudi Arabia (1999, out of 5), Mexico (2001, out of 3), Colombia (2003, out of 5), Australia (2005, out of 3), South Africa (2009, out of 5), United States (2009, out of 5), Japan (2013, out of 3), Tahiti (2013, out of 3)
Most losses, champions
1, France (2001), Brazil (2005)
All matches won without extra time, replays, penalty shoot-outs or play-offs
Argentina, 1992 (2 matches); Brazil, 2009 (5 matches); Brazil, 2013 (5 matches)
Most goals scored
18, Brazil (1999)
Fewest goals conceded
1, Argentina (1992), Denmark (1995), Nigeria (1995), Japan (2001), Cameroon (2003), Iraq (2009)
Most goals conceded
24, Tahiti (2013)
Highest goal difference
+12, Brazil (1997, 1999)
Highest goal difference, champions
+12, Brazil (1997)
Lowest goal difference
-23, Tahiti (2013)
Lowest goal difference, champions
+4, Denmark (1995)
Highest average of goals scored per match
3.60, Brazil (1999)
Most goals scored, champions
14, Brazil (1997, 2009, 2013)
Most goals scored, hosts
15, Germany (2005)
Fewest goals scored, champions
5, Denmark (1995)
Fewest goals scored, hosts
0, Saudi Arabia (1995)
Fewest goals conceded, champions
1, Argentina (1992), Denmark (1995)
Fewest goals conceded, hosts
1, Japan (2001)
Most goals conceded, champions
6, Mexico (1999), Brazil (2005)
Most goals conceded, hosts
11, Germany (2005)
Lowest average of goals scored per match, champions
1.67, Denmark (1995)
Most wins against Confederations Cup champions
(Note: In 2001, France defeated Mexico during the group stage and Brazil in the semi-final. In 2001, Australia defeated Mexico during the group stage and Brazil in the third place play-off.) 2, France, 2001; Australia, 2001

== Streaks ==
Most consecutive wins
12, Brazil, from 3–2 Germany (2005) to 3–0 Spain (2013)
Most consecutive matches without a loss
13, Brazil, from 2–2 Japan (2005) to 3–0 Spain (2013)
Most consecutive losses
8, New Zealand, from 1–2 United States (1999) to 0–2 South Africa (2009)
Most consecutive matches without a win
12, New Zealand, from 1–2 United States (1999) to 0–4 Portugal (2017)
Most consecutive matches without a draw
12, Brazil, from 3–2 Germany (2005) to 3–0 Spain (2013)
Most consecutive matches scoring at least one goal
13, Brazil, from 2–2 Japan (2005) to 3–0 Spain (2013)
Most consecutive matches scoring at least two goals
6, Brazil, from 2–2 Japan (2005) to 3–0 Italy (2009), from 3–2 United States (2009) to 3–0 Spain (2013), Germany, from 4–3 Australia (2005) to 3–2 Australia (2017)
Most consecutive matches scoring at least three goals
5, Brazil, from 3–2 Germany (2005) to 3–0 Italy (2009)
Most consecutive matches without scoring a goal
5, New Zealand, from 0–5 France (2003) to 0–0 Russia (2017)
Most consecutive matches without conceding a goal (clean sheets)
5, Brazil, from 2–0 Czech Republic (1997) to 2–0 New Zealand (1999), Cameroon, from 2–0 Canada (2001) to 1–0 Colombia (2003)
Most consecutive matches conceding at least one goal
8, New Zealand, from 1–2 United States (1999) to 0–2 South Africa (2009)
Most consecutive matches conceding at least two goals
8, New Zealand, from 1–2 United States (1999) to 0–2 South Africa (2009)
Most consecutive matches conceding at least three goals
4, New Zealand, from 0–3 Japan (2003) to 0–5 Spain (2009)

== Penalty shoot-outs ==
Most shoot-outs, team, all-time
3, Mexico
Most shoot-outs, team, tournament
2, Mexico, 1995; Italy, 2013
Most shoot-outs, all teams, tournament
2, 1995, 2013
Most wins, team, all-time
1, Denmark, Mexico, Argentina, Spain, Italy, Chile
Most losses, team, all-time
2, Mexico
Most shoot-outs with 100% record (all won)
1, Denmark, Argentina, Spain, Chile
Most shoot-outs with 0% record (all lost)
1, Nigeria, Uruguay, Portugal
Most successful kicks, shoot-out, one team
7 (out of 7), Spain, vs Italy, 2013
Most successful kicks, shoot-out, both teams
13 (out of 14), Spain (7) vs Italy (6), 2013
Most successful kicks, team, all-time
12 (out of 15), Mexico
Most successful kicks, team, tournament
9, Italy, 2013 (in 2 shoot-outs)
Most successful kicks, all teams, tournament
18, 2013 (in 2 shoot-outs)
Most successful kicks, player
2, Claudio Suárez (Mexico, 1995); Alberto Aquilani (Italy, 2013)
Most kicks taken, shoot-out, both teams
14, Spain (7) vs Italy (7), 2013
Most kicks taken, team, all-time
15, Mexico (in 3 shoot-outs)
Most kicks taken, team, tournament
11, Italy, 2013 (in 2 shoot-outs)
Most kicks taken, all teams, tournament
23, 2013 (in 2 shoot-outs)
Most kicks missed, shoot-out, one team
3, Uruguay, vs Italy, 2013; Portugal, vs Chile, 2017
Most kicks missed, shoot-out, both teams
4, Uruguay (3) vs Italy (1), 2013
Most kicks missed, team, all-time
3, Mexico (in 2 shoot-outs); Uruguay (in 1 shoot-out); Portugal (in 1 shoot-out)
Most kicks missed, team, tournament
3, Uruguay, 2013 (in 1 shoot-out); Portugal, 2017 (in 1 shoot-out)
Most kicks missed, all teams, tournament
5, 2013 (in 2 shoot-outs)
Fewest successful kicks, shoot-out, one team
0, Portugal, vs Chile, 2017
Fewest successful kicks, shoot-out, both teams
3, Portugal (0) vs Chile (3), 2013
Most saves, all-time
3, Gianluigi Buffon (Italy, 2013); Claudio Bravo (Chile, 2017)
Most saves, tournament
3, Gianluigi Buffon (Italy, 2013); Claudio Bravo (Chile, 2017)
Most saves, shoot-out
3, Gianluigi Buffon (Italy), vs Uruguay, 2013; Claudio Bravo (Chile), vs Portugal, 2017

== Goalscoring ==
=== Individual ===
Most goals scored in Finals competition
6, Cuauhtémoc Blanco (Mexico, 1997, 1999), Ronaldinho (Brazil, 1999, 2005)
Top goal scorer in single tournament
7, Romário of Brazil in 1997
Most goals scored in a Finals match
4, on four occasions, as follows:
Cuauhtémoc Blanco (Mexico, 5–1 vs Saudi Arabia, 1999)
Marzouk Al-Otaibi (Saudi Arabia, 5–1 vs Egypt, 1999)
Fernando Torres (Spain, 10–0 vs Tahiti, 2013)
Abel Hernández (Uruguay, 8–0 vs Tahiti, 2013)
Most goals scored in a final
3, on two occasions, as follows:
Ronaldo (Brazil, 6–0 vs Australia, 1997)
Romário (Brazil, 6–0 vs Australia, 1997)
Most matches with at least one goal
7, Ronaldinho (Brazil, 1999–2005)
Most consecutive matches with at least one goal
4, Ronaldinho (Brazil, 1999)
Most matches with at least two goals
2, Gabriel Batistuta (Argentina, 1992 & 1995); Vladimír Šmicer (Czech Republic, 1997); Romário (Brazil, 1997); Cuauhtémoc Blanco (Mexico, 1997 & 1999); Marzouk Al-Otaibi (Saudi Arabia, 1999); Alex (Brazil, 1999); John Aloisi (Australia, 2005); Luís Fabiano (Brazil, 2009); Fernando Torres (Spain, 2009 & 2013); Fred (Brazil, 2013)
Most consecutive matches with at least two goals
2, Marzouk Al-Otaibi (Saudi Arabia, 1999); John Aloisi (Australia, 2005)
Most hat-tricks
2, Fernando Torres (Spain, 2009 & 2013)
Fastest hat-trick
11 minutes, Fernando Torres (Spain vs New Zealand, 2009)
Most goals scored by a substitute in a Finals match
2, on five occasions, as follows:
Alex (Brazil vs Germany, 1999)
Giuseppe Rossi (Italy vs United States, 2009)
Daniel Güiza (Spain vs South Africa, 2009)
Katlego Mphela (South Africa vs Spain, 2009)
Luis Suárez (Uruguay vs Tahiti, 2013)
First goalscorer
Fahad Al-Bishi (Saudi Arabia), vs United States, 15 October 1992
Youngest goalscorer
19 years and 10 days, Marcelo Zalayeta (Uruguay vs Czech Republic, 1997)
Youngest hat-trick scorer
19 years and 132 days, Ronaldinho (Brazil vs Saudi Arabia, 1999)
Youngest goalscorer, final
21 years and 94 days, Ronaldo (Brazil vs Australia, 1997)
Oldest goalscorer
38 years and 129 days, Lothar Matthäus (Germany vs New Zealand, 1999)
Oldest hat-trick scorer
32 years and 137 days, David Villa (Spain vs Tahiti, 2013)
Oldest goalscorer, final
31 years, 326 days, Romário (Brazil vs Australia, 1997)
Most penalties scored (excluding penalty shoot-outs)
3, Michael Ballack (Germany, three in 2005)
Fastest goal
75 seconds, Abel Hernández (Uruguay vs Tahiti, 2013)
Fastest penalty kick converted
8th minute, Michael Laudrup (Denmark vs Argentina, 1995)
Fastest goal by a substitute
1 minute, Mike Hanke (Germany vs Tunisia, 2005); Giuseppe Rossi (Italy vs United States, 2009)
Fastest goal in a final
91 seconds, Fred (Brazil vs Spain, 2013)
Latest goal from kickoff
110th minute, Luciano Figueroa (Argentina vs Mexico, 2005)
Latest goal from kickoff in a final
97th minute, Thierry Henry (France vs Cameroon 2003)
Latest goal from kickoff, with no goals scored in between
104th minute, Carlos Salcido (Mexico vs Argentina, 2005)

=== Team ===
Biggest margin of victory
10, Spain (10) vs Tahiti (0), 2013
Most goals scored in a match, one team
10, Spain, vs Tahiti, 2013
Most goals scored in a match, both teams
10, Brazil (8) vs Saudi Arabia (2), 1999
Spain (10) vs Tahiti (0), 2013
Largest deficit overcome in a win
2 goals, Brazil, 2009 (coming from 0–2 down to win 3–2 vs United States)
Italy, 2013 (coming from 0–2 down to win 4–3 vs Japan)
Largest deficit overcome in a draw
2 goals, Egypt, 1999 (coming from 0–2 down to draw 2–2 vs Mexico)
Most goals scored in extra time, both teams
2, Mexico (1) vs Argentina (1), 2005
Most goals scored in a final, one team
6, Brazil, vs Australia, 1997
Most goals scored in a final, both teams
7, Mexico (4) vs Brazil (3), 1999
Fewest goals scored in a final, both teams
1, Japan (0) vs France (1), 2001
Cameroon (0) vs France (1), 2003
Chile (0) vs Germany (1), 2017
Biggest margin of victory in a final
6, Brazil (6) vs Australia (0), 1997
Largest deficit overcome in a win in a final
2 goals, Brazil, 2009 (coming from 0–2 down to win 3–2 vs United States)
Most individual goalscorers for one team, one match
5, Brazil vs Saudi Arabia, 1999 (João Carlos, Ronaldinho, Zé Roberto, Alex, Rôni)
France vs South Korea, 2001 (Steve Marlet, Patrick Vieira, Nicolas Anelka, Youri Djorkaeff, Sylvain Wiltord)
France vs New Zealand, 2003 (Olivier Kapo, Thierry Henry, Djibril Cissé, Ludovic Giuly, Robert Pires)
Most individual goalscorers for one team, one tournament
8, France, 2001 (Steve Marlet, Patrick Vieira, Nicolas Anelka, Youri Djorkaeff, Sylvain Wiltord, Eric Carrière, Robert Pires, Marcel Desailly)
Germany, 2005 (Kevin Kurányi, Per Mertesacker, Michael Ballack, Lukas Podolski, Bastian Schweinsteiger, Mike Hanke, Gerald Asamoah, Robert Huth)
Brazil, 2009 (Kaká, Luís Fabiano, Juan, Felipe Melo, Robinho, Maicon, Dani Alves, Lúcio)
Italy, 2013 (Andrea Pirlo, Mario Balotelli, Daniele De Rossi, Sebastian Giovinco, Emanuele Giaccherini, Giorgio Chiellini, Davide Astori, Alessandro Diamanti)
Portugal, 2017 (Ricardo Quaresma, Cédric, Cristiano Ronaldo, Bernardo Silva, André Silva, Nani, Pepe, Adrien Silva)

=== Own goals ===
Mohamed Obaid Al-Zahiri (United Arab Emirates), vs Czech Republic, 1997
Andrea Dossena (Italy), vs Brazil, 2009
Nicolas Vallar (Tahiti), vs Nigeria, 2013
Jonathan Tehau (Tahiti), vs Nigeria, 2013
Atsuto Uchida (Japan), vs Italy, 2013
Michael Boxall (New Zealand), vs Russia, 2017
Luís Neto (Portugal), vs Mexico, 2017

=== Top scoring teams by tournament ===
- 1992: **Argentina**, 7 goals
- 1995: Argentina & **Denmark**, 5 goals
- 1997: **Brazil**, 14 goals
- 1999: Brazil, 18 goals
- 2001: **France**, 12 goals
- 2003: **France**, 12 goals
- 2005: Germany, 15 goals
- 2009: **Brazil**, 14 goals
- 2013: Spain, 15 goals
- 2017: **Germany**, 12 goals

Teams listed in bold won the tournament.

== Manager records ==
=== Foreign manager wins ===
None

=== Most wins ===
All won one each

=== Won tournament both as player and as manager ===
Dunga, Brazil (1997 as player, 2009 as coach)

== Discipline ==
Fastest sending off
24th minute, Mark Viduka, Australia vs Brazil, 1997
Latest sending off
112th minute, Raúl Jiménez, Mexico vs Portugal, 2017
Most sendings off (tournament)
6 (in 16 matches), 1999
Most sendings off (all-time, team)
5, Egypt, United States

== Awards ==
=== Golden Ball ===
The Golden Ball was awarded to the best player of the tournament. A Silver Ball and Bronze Ball were also awarded to the second and third best players of the tournament, respectively.

Tournament	Golden Ball	Silver Ball	Bronze Ball
1992 Saudi Arabia	(Argentina) Fernando Redondo	—N/a	—N/a
1995 Saudi Arabia	(Denmark) Brian Laudrup	—N/a	—N/a
1997 Saudi Arabia	(Brazil) Denílson	(Brazil) Romário	(Czech Republic) Vladimír Šmicer
1999 Mexico	(Brazil) Ronaldinho	(Mexico) Cuauhtémoc Blanco	(Saudi Arabia) Marzouk Al-Otaibi
2001 South Korea/Japan	(France) Robert Pires	(France) Patrick Vieira	(Japan) Hidetoshi Nakata
2003 France	(France) Thierry Henry	(Turkey) Tuncay	(Cameroon) Marc-Vivien Foé
2005 Germany	(Brazil) Adriano	(Argentina) Juan Román Riquelme	(Brazil) Ronaldinho
2009 South Africa	(Brazil) Kaká	(Brazil) Luís Fabiano	(United States) Clint Dempsey
2013 Brazil	(Brazil) Neymar	(Spain) Andrés Iniesta	(Brazil) Paulinho
2017 Russia	(Germany) Julian Draxler	(Chile) Alexis Sánchez	(Germany) Leon Goretzka

=== Golden Boot ===
The Golden Boot was awarded to the top scorer of the tournament. If more than one players were equal by same goals, the players were selected based by the most assists during the tournament.

Tournament	Golden Boot	Goals
1992 Saudi Arabia	(Argentina) Gabriel Batistuta	2
1995 Saudi Arabia	(Mexico) Luis García	3
1997 Saudi Arabia	(Brazil) Romário	7
1999 Mexico	(Brazil) Ronaldinho	6
2001 South Korea/Japan	(France) Robert Pires	2
2003 France	(France) Thierry Henry	4
2005 Germany	(Brazil) Adriano	5
2009 South Africa	(Brazil) Luís Fabiano	5
2013 Brazil	(Spain) Fernando Torres	5
2017 Russia	(Germany) Timo Werner	3

=== Golden Glove ===
The Golden Glove was awarded to the best goalkeeper of the tournament.

Tournament	Golden Glove
2005 Germany	(Mexico) Oswaldo Sánchez
2009 South Africa	(United States) Tim Howard
2013 Brazil	(Brazil) Júlio César
2017 Russia	(Chile) Claudio Bravo

=== FIFA Fair Play Trophy ===
FIFA Fair Play Trophy was given to the team (or teams) who had the best fair play record during the tournament with the criteria set by FIFA Fair Play Committee.

Tournament	FIFA Fair Play Award
1997 Saudi Arabia	South Africa
1999 Mexico	Brazil; New Zealand
2001 South Korea/Japan	Japan
2003 France	Japan
2005 Germany	Greece
2009 South Africa	Brazil
2013 Brazil	Spain
2017 Russia	Germany

=== Man of the Match Award ===
The Man of the Match award was awarded to the most valuable player of every match in the tournament. It was first awarded in the 2009 edition, in South Africa.

- (Brazil) Neymar won four Man of the Match awards, which is a record in the tournament's history. He received all of them in the 2013 edition.

== Attendance ==
Year & host	Total attendance	No. of matches	Avg. attendance
(Saudi Arabia) 1992	169,500	4	42,375
(Saudi Arabia) 1995	165,000	8	20,625
(Saudi Arabia) 1997	333,500	16	20,844
(Mexico) 1999	970,000	16	60,625
(South Korea) (Japan) 2001	557,191	16	34,824
(France) 2003	491,700	16	30,731
(Germany) 2005	603,106	16	37,694
(South Africa) 2009	584,894	16	36,556
(Brazil) 2013	804,659	16	50,291
(Russia) 2017	628,304	16	39,269

- Green background shading indicates attendance records.

== See also ==
- List of FIFA Confederations Cup red cards
- List of FIFA Confederations Cup hat-tricks
- List of FIFA Confederations Cup finals
- FIFA World Cup
