= List of FIFA Confederations Cup finals =

- Founded: 1992
- Abolished: 2017
- Teams: 8
- Last champions: Germany (1st title)
- Most championships: Brazil (4 titles)

The FIFA Confederations Cup was an international association football competition established in 1992 as the King Fahd Cup and known as the FIFA Confederations Cup from 1997 to 2017. It was contested by eight men's national teams of the members of Fédération Internationale de Football Association (FIFA), the sport's global governing body, who qualified by winning their respective continental tournaments. The Confederations Cup final matches were the last of the competition, and the results determine which country's team were declared champions. If after 90 minutes of regular play the score is a draw, an additional 30-minute period of play, called extra time, was added. If such a game is still tied after extra time it is decided by kicks from the penalty mark, commonly called a penalty shoot-out. The winning penalty shoot-out team were then declared champions.

In the ten tournaments held, 33 nations have appeared at least once. Of these, thirteen made it to the final match, and six had won. With four titles, Brazil was the most successful team. The other former champions were France, with two titles, and Argentina, Denmark, Mexico and Germany with one title each. The competition was cancelled in 2019 and replaced with an expanded FIFA Club World Cup.

== List of finals ==
Key to the list of finals
†	Match was won by a golden goal

- The "Year" column refers to the year the Confederations Cup tournament was held, and wikilinks to the article about that tournament.
- Links in the "Winners" and "Runners-up" columns point to the articles for the national football teams of the countries, not the articles for the countries.
- The wikilinks in the "Final score" column point to the article about that tournament's final game.

Year	Champions	Score	Runners-up	Venue	Location	Attendance
1992	Argentina	3–1	Saudi Arabia	King Fahd International Stadium	Riyadh, Saudi Arabia	75,000
1995	Denmark	2–0	Argentina	King Fahd International Stadium	Riyadh, Saudi Arabia	35,000
1997	Brazil	6–0	Australia	King Fahd International Stadium	Riyadh, Saudi Arabia	65,000
1999	Mexico	4–3	Brazil	Estadio Azteca	Mexico City, Mexico	110,000
2001	France	1–0	Japan	International Stadium	Yokohama, Japan	65,533
2003	France	1–0^{†} (Note: Score was 0–0 after 90 minutes. France scored the golden goal in the 7th minute of extra time.)	Cameroon	Stade de France	Saint-Denis, France	51,985
2005	Brazil	4–1	Argentina	Waldstadion	Frankfurt, Germany	45,591
2009	Brazil	3–2	United States	Ellis Park	Johannesburg, South Africa	52,291
2013	Brazil	3–0	Spain	Estádio do Maracanã	Rio de Janeiro, Brazil	73,531
2017	Germany	1–0	Chile	Krestovsky Stadium	Saint Petersburg, Russia	57,268

== Results by nation ==
National team	Winners	Runners-up	Total	Years Won	Years Runners-up
Brazil	4	1	5	1997, 2005, 2009, 2013	1999
France	2	0	2	2001, 2003	–
Argentina	1	2	3	1992	1995, 2005
Denmark	1	0	1	1995	–
Germany	1	0	1	2017	–
Mexico	1	0	1	1999	–
Saudi Arabia	0	1	1	–	1992
Australia	0	1	1	–	1997
Japan	0	1	1	–	2001
Cameroon	0	1	1	–	2003
United States	0	1	1	–	2009
Spain	0	1	1	–	2013
Chile	0	1	1	–	2017

== Results by confederations ==
Confederations	Winners	Runners up	Appearances
CONMEBOL	5	4	9
UEFA	4	1	5
CONCACAF	1	1	2
AFC	0	2	2
CAF	0	1	1
OFC	0	1	1
