= List of FIFA Confederations Cup hat-tricks =

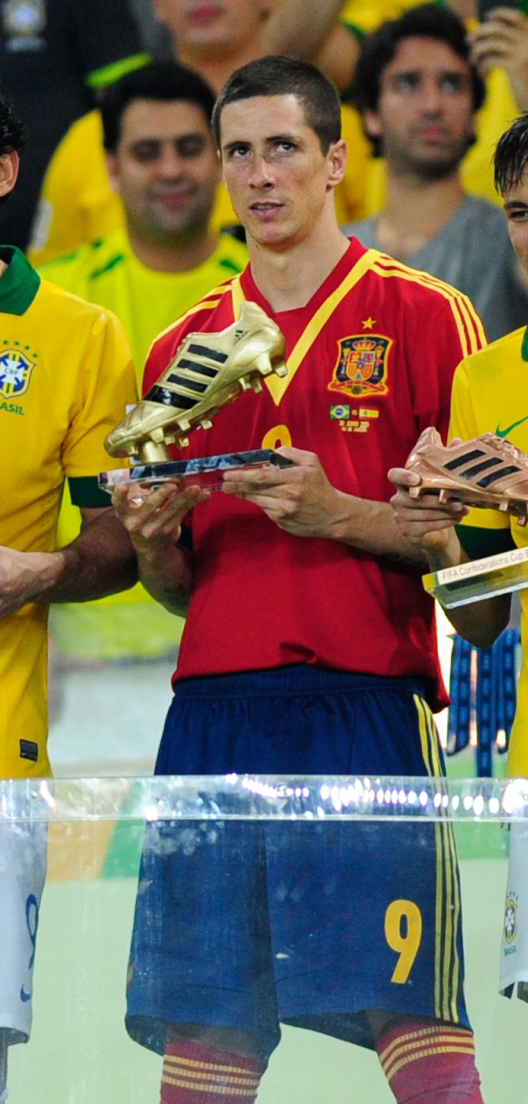
Fernando Torres from. Spain was the only player to score two Confederations Cup hat-tricks

This is a list of all hat-tricks scored during the FIFA Confederations Cup; this is an occasion when a footballer scores three or more goals in a single football FIFA Confederations Cup finals match. Scoring a hat-trick in a FIFA Confederations Cup was a relatively rare event: only 9 hat-tricks were scored in 108 matches in the 8 editions of the tournament. As FIFA is the governing body of football, official hat-tricks are only noted when FIFA recognises that at least three goals were scored by one player in one match.

== Notable hat-tricks ==
- The first hat-trick was scored by Vladimír Šmicer of the Czech Republic, playing against the United Arab Emirates in the 1997 FIFA Confederations Cup; the final hat-trick was scored by Abel Hernández of Uruguay, netting four times against Tahiti in the 2013 FIFA Confederations Cup.
- Spain's Fernando Torres became the first player to score hat tricks at two different FIFA Confederations Cups. He completed his first hat trick against New Zealand in 2009, while repeating that same feat in 2013 against Tahiti.
- Mexico's Cuauhtémoc Blanco and Saudi Arabia's Marzouk Al-Otaibi in the 1999 FIFA Confederations Cup; and Spain's Fernando Torres and Uruguay's Abel Hernández in the 2013 FIFA Confederations Cup each scored four goals in single game.
- Ronaldo and Romário both of Brazil are only players to score hat-tricks in the final match in 1997 against Australia in 6–0 victory.
- Aside from the first two King Fahd tournaments (1992 King Fahd Cup and 1995 King Fahd Cup), where no hat-tricks were scored, only on three occasions were there no hat-tricks scored during an entire Confederations Cup tournament; the 2001 edition in South Korea and Japan, 2003 in France, and 2017 in Russia.
- There have been two occasions when two hat-tricks have been scored in the same match : when Brazil defeated Australia 6–0 in the final match of 1997, Ronaldo and Romário both of Brazil, scored three goals each; and when Spain defeated Tahiti 10–0 in 2013, Torres scored 4 goals and Villa scored 3 goals for Spain.
- Brazil and Spain scored the most hat-tricks with 3 each.
- Tahiti hold the record of conceding the most hat-tricks with 4, also conceding at least one in every match they've played in at the tournament.
- The record number of hat-tricks in a single FIFA Confederations Cup tournament is four, which occurred during the 2013 FIFA Confederations Cup in Brazil.

== List of FIFA Confederations Cup hat-tricks ==
#	Player	No. of goals	Time of goals	Representing	Final score	Opponent	Tournament	Round	Date	Report
1.	Vladimír Šmicer	3	42', 68', 71'	Czech Republic	6–1	United Arab Emirates	1997 Saudi Arabia	Group stage	17 December 1997	Report
2.	Ronaldo	3	15', 27', 59' (pen.)	Brazil	6–0	Australia	1997 Saudi Arabia	Final	21 December 1997	Report
3.	Romário	3	38', 53', 75'	Brazil	6–0	Australia	1997 Saudi Arabia	Final	21 December 1997	Report
4.	Cuauhtémoc Blanco	4	12', 19', 68', 77'	Mexico	5–1	Saudi Arabia	1999 Mexico	Group stage	25 July 1999	Report
5.	Marzouk Al-Otaibi	4	8', 34', 78', 85'	Saudi Arabia	5–1	Egypt	1999 Mexico	Group stage	29 July 1999	Report
6.	Ronaldinho	3	11', 65', 90+2'	Brazil	8–2	Saudi Arabia	1999 Mexico	Semi-finals	1 August 1999	Report
7.	Luciano Figueroa	3	12', 53', 89'	Argentina	4–2	Australia	2005 Germany	Group stage	18 June 2005	Report
8.	Fernando Torres	3	6', 14', 17'	Spain	5–0	New Zealand	2009 South Africa	Group stage	14 June 2009	Report
9.	Nnamdi Oduamadi	3	10', 26', 76'	Nigeria	6–1	Tahiti	2013 Brazil	Group stage	17 June 2013	Report
10.	Fernando Torres (II)	4	5', 33', 57', 78'	Spain	10–0	Tahiti	2013 Brazil	Group stage	20 June 2013	Report
11.	David Villa	3	39', 49', 64'	Spain	10–0	Tahiti	2013 Brazil	Group stage	20 June 2013	Report
12.	Abel Hernández	4	2', 24', 45+1', 67'	Uruguay	8–0	Tahiti	2013 Brazil	Group stage	23 June 2005	Report

== See also ==
- FIFA Confederations Cup records and statistics
- FIFA Confederations Cup
