= 2013 FIFA Confederations Cup final =

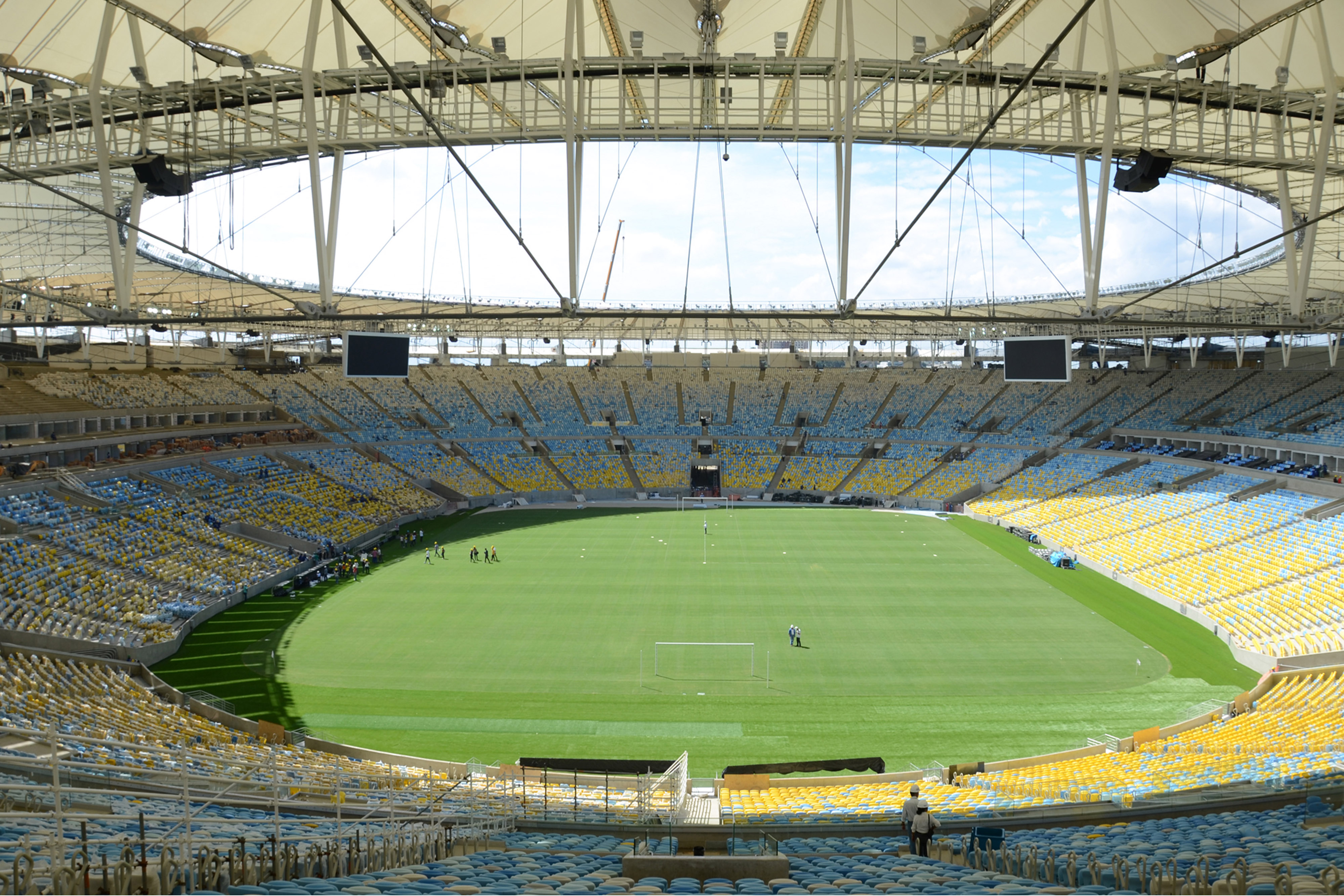
- The Estádio do Maracanã hosted the final.
- Event: 2013 FIFA Confederations Cup
Brazil	Spain
(Brazil)	(Spain)
3	0
- Date: 30 June 2013
- Venue: Estádio do Maracanã, Rio de Janeiro
- Man of the Match: Neymar (Brazil)
- Referee: Björn Kuipers (Netherlands)
- Attendance: 73,531
- Weather: Clear night 23 °C (73 °F); 81% humidity

The 2013 FIFA Confederations Cup final was a football match to determine the winners of the 2013 FIFA Confederations Cup. The match was held at the Estádio do Maracanã, Rio de Janeiro, Brazil, on 30 June 2013 and was contested by the winners of the semi-finals, Brazil and Spain. Brazil defeated Spain 3–0 with goals from Fred and Neymar, thus breaking Spain's record of 29 competitive games without a defeat.

The match was Brazil's fifth appearance and third straight in the final (after 1997, 1999, 2005, and 2009). Spain reached their first ever Confederations Cup final. The win gave Brazil their third consecutive Confederations Cup title and fourth overall.

== Background ==
Before the final, Brazil and Spain had previously faced each other eight times, of which Brazil have recorded a total of four wins compared to Spain's two, with the remaining two matches ending in draws. The two sides' debut match was played on 27 May 1934, in the first round of the 1934 FIFA World Cup in Italy, held at the Stadio Luigi Ferraris in Genoa. It ended in a 3–1 win in favor of Spain. Sixteen years later, at the 1950 World Cup, the two sides met again in the final round stage, which contained Sweden and Uruguay. Brazil responded by winning 6–1 in front of their 153,000 home spectators. The last meeting took place 13 November 1999, in a 0–0 friendly draw at the Balaídos, Vigo, Spain.

Brazil had won the FIFA Confederations Cup three times, in 1997 against Australia, in 2005 against Argentina and 2009 against the United States. They had competed in every Confederations Cup competition since FIFA's takeover in 1997, with Brazil losing the 1999 final against Mexico 4–3. Spain qualified for the 2009 FIFA Confederations Cup, their first ever appearance after winning the UEFA European Championship in 2008 against Germany. They reached the semi-finals, but lost 2–0 to the United States, resulting in Spain competing for the third-place play-off against South Africa, who had lost 1–0 against Brazil in the second semi-final match. The match ended in a 3–2 scoreline for Spain. Brazil were ranked 22nd in the FIFA World Rankings, considered to be their worst rank ever achieved, while Spain were ranked first.

== Route to the final ==
Brazil		Round	Spain	
Opponent	Result	Group stage	Opponent	Result
Japan	3–0	Matchday 1	Uruguay	2–1
Mexico	2–0	Matchday 2	(French Polynesia) Tahiti	10–0
Italy	4–2	Matchday 3	Nigeria	3–0
Group A winner: Pos / Team / Pld / W / D / L / GF / GA / GD / Pts / Qualification; 1 / Brazil (H) / 3 / 3 / 0 / 0 / 9 / 2 / +7 / 9 / Advance to knockout stage; 2 / Italy / 3 / 2 / 0 / 1 / 8 / 8 / 0 / 6 / Advance to knockout stage; 3 / Mexico / 3 / 1 / 0 / 2 / 3 / 5 / −2 / 3; 4 / Japan / 3 / 0 / 0 / 3 / 4 / 9 / −5 / 0; Source: FIFA (H) Hosts		Final standings	Group B winner: Pos / Team / Pld / W / D / L / GF / GA / GD / Pts / Qualification; 1 / Spain / 3 / 3 / 0 / 0 / 15 / 1 / +14 / 9 / Advance to knockout stage; 2 / Uruguay / 3 / 2 / 0 / 1 / 11 / 3 / +8 / 6 / Advance to knockout stage; 3 / Nigeria / 3 / 1 / 0 / 2 / 7 / 6 / +1 / 3; 4 / Tahiti / 3 / 0 / 0 / 3 / 1 / 24 / −23 / 0; Source: FIFA	
Opponent	Result	Knockout stage	Opponent	Result
Uruguay	2–1	Semi-finals	Italy	0–0 (a.e.t.) (7–6 p)

== Pre-match ==
=== Venue ===
The Estádio do Maracanã in Rio de Janeiro was announced as the venue of the final. It is the largest of the six 2013 Confederations Cup venues. The stadium was used at the 2014 FIFA World Cup.

=== Match ball ===
The Adidas Cafusa, provided by Adidas, was the official match ball of the tournament. The ball had been previously used at the 2012 FIFA Club World Cup.

=== Officials ===
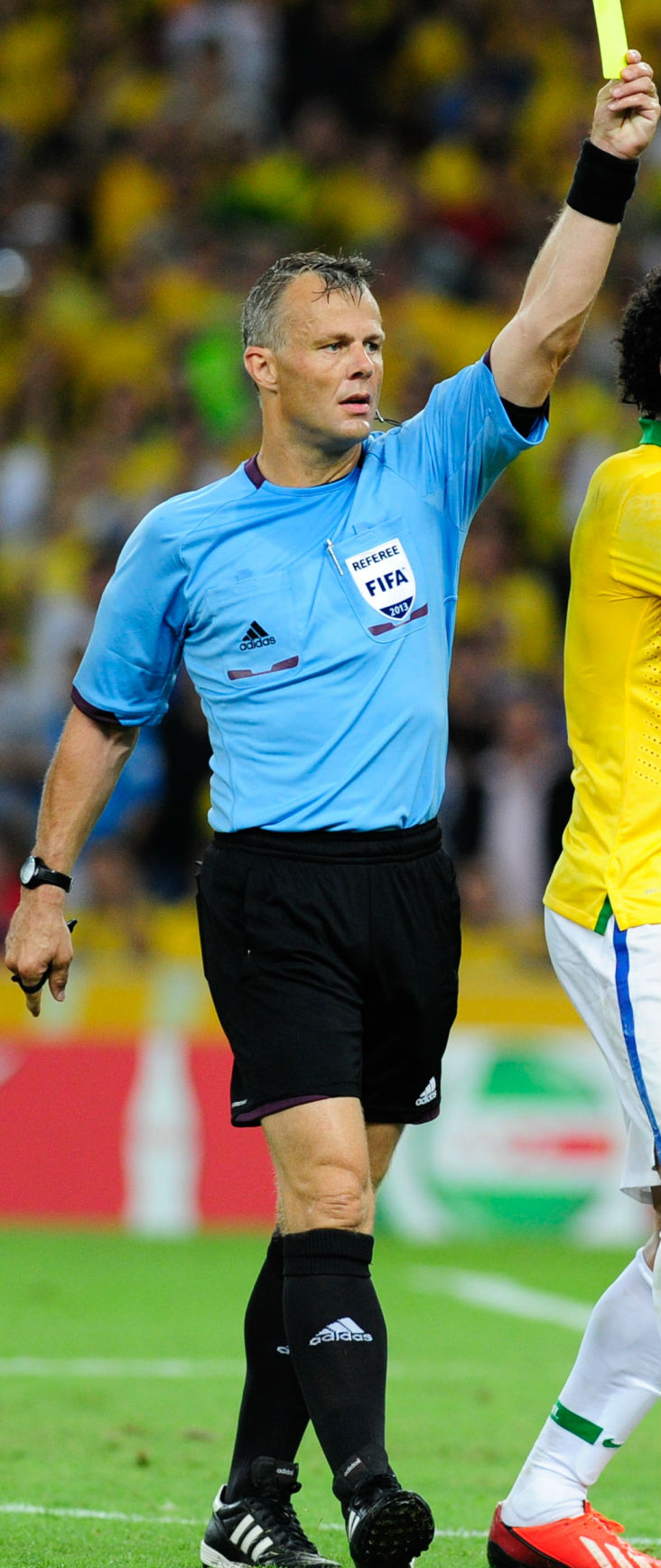
Björn Kuipers (pictured in the final) has been an international referee since 2006.

Björn Kuipers of the Royal Dutch Football Association (KNVB) and UEFA was selected to referee the final. Having been an international referee since 2006, he made his debut in the 2006 UEFA European Under-17 Football Championship youth competition, where he officiated in the final between Czech Republic under-17s and Russia under-17s. One year later, he appeared in his first Champions League match in July between Zeta and Kaunas in the first qualifying round. On 14 January 2009, Kuipers was promoted to elite level in European football. This led to him taking charge of his first proper Champions League match on 29 September 2009 in the group stage between Barcelona and Dynamo Kyiv. Ahead of the final, Kuipers had refereed 23 Champions League matches and 15 UEFA Cup/Europa League matches, including his first senior final, the 2013 UEFA Europa League Final between Benfica and Chelsea. He has also refereed at the 2010 FIFA Club World Cup and UEFA Euro 2012.

Kuipers was assisted by his compatriots Sander van Roekel and Erwin Zeinstra; the trio had previously taken charge of the Group B match between Nigeria and Uruguay earlier in the tournament. They were joined by fourth and fifth officials Felix Brych and Mark Borsch, representing the German Football Association (DFB).

== Match ==
=== Summary ===
In the second minute of the game, a cross from the right by Hulk was not dealt with by defenders Álvaro Arbeloa, Gerard Piqué or goalkeeper Iker Casillas. The ball fell to Brazil forward Fred, who had slipped and while lying on the ground managed to improvise and poke the ball past Casillas to give Brazil the lead. In 39th minute, Spain almost equalised when Pedro beat the goalkeeper from the right but saw his shot hooked off the line and over the bar by David Luiz. Brazil increased their lead just before half time when Oscar passed to Neymar on the left side of the penalty area and he hit the ball left footed hard and high at the near post past Casillas. The third goal for Brazil arrived two minutes into the second half when Fred curled the ball low right footed inside the far post from the left, with Casillas getting his fingers to the shot but unable to keep it out. Five minutes later, Marcelo tripped Jesús Navas to give away a penalty. Sergio Ramos took the penalty but he shot low, right-footed, and past the goalkeeper's right post. In the 68th minute, Gerard Piqué was shown a red card for bringing down Neymar just outside the penalty area.

=== Details ===
30 June 2013
19:00 BRT

Brazil	3–0	Spain
Fred 2', 48'; Neymar 44'	Report

Estádio do Maracanã, Rio de Janeiro
Attendance: 73,531
Referee: Björn Kuipers (Netherlands)

Brazil	Spain

GK	12	Júlio César
RB	2	Dani Alves
CB	3	Thiago Silva (c)
CB	4	David Luiz
LB	6	Marcelo
DM	18	Paulinho	(substituted off) 88'
DM	17	Luiz Gustavo
CM	11	Oscar
RW	19	Hulk	(substituted off) 73'
LW	10	Neymar
CF	9	Fred	(substituted off) 80'
Substitutions:
MF	23	Jádson	(substituted on) 73'
FW	21	Jô	(substituted on) 80'
MF	8	Hernanes	(substituted on) 88'
Manager:
Luiz Felipe Scolari

GK	1	Iker Casillas (c)
RB	17	Álvaro Arbeloa	(yellow card) 15'	(substituted off) 46'
CB	15	Sergio Ramos	(yellow card) 28'
CB	3	Gerard Piqué	(red card) 68'
LB	18	Jordi Alba
DM	16	Sergio Busquets
CM	8	Xavi
CM	6	Andrés Iniesta
RW	11	Pedro
LW	13	Juan Mata		(substituted off) 52'
CF	9	Fernando Torres		(substituted off) 59'
Substitutions:
DF	5	César Azpilicueta		(substituted on) 46'
MF	22	Jesús Navas		(substituted on) 52'
FW	7	David Villa		(substituted on) 59'
Manager:
Vicente del Bosque

Man of the Match:
Neymar (Brazil)

Assistant referees:
Sander van Roekel (Netherlands)
Erwin Zeinstra (Netherlands)
Fourth official:
Felix Brych (Germany)
Fifth official:
Mark Borsch (Germany)

=== Statistics ===
Overall
	Brazil	Spain
Goals scored	3	0
Total shots	14	15
Shots on target	8	7
Ball possession	47%	53%
Corner kicks	1	8
Fouls committed	26	16
Offsides	2	0
Yellow cards	0	2
Red cards	0	1

== See also ==
- 2013 FIFA Confederations Cup knockout stage
