= List of FIFA Women's World Cup hat-tricks =

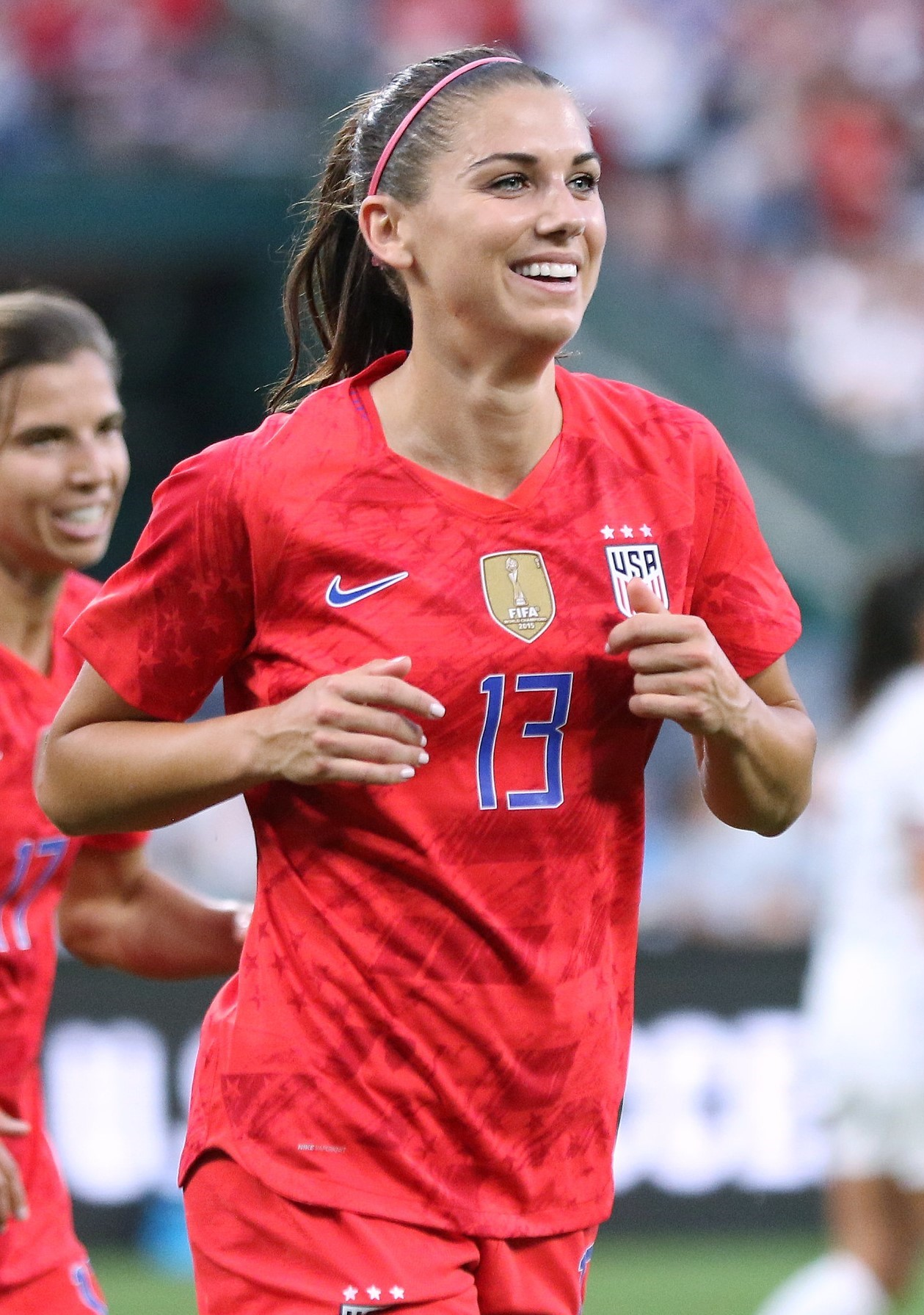
Alex Morgan of the United States scored a joint-record 5 goals in a record 13–0 win against Thailand.

This is a list of all hat-tricks scored during FIFA Women's World Cups; that is, the occasions when a footballer has scored three or more goals in a single football World Cup match (not including FIFA Women's World Cup qualification matches). So far, 27 hat-tricks have been scored in over 270 matches in the 9 editions of the World Cup tournament. As FIFA is the governing body of association football, official hat-tricks are only noted when FIFA recognises that at least three goals were scored by one player in one match.

The first hat-trick was scored by Carolina Morace of Italy, playing against Chinese Taipei in the 1991 FIFA Women's World Cup; the most recent (as of 2 August 2023) was by Kadidiatou Diani of France, playing against Panama in the 2023 FIFA Women's World Cup.

The record number of hat-tricks in a single World Cup tournament is six, which occurred during the 2015 FIFA Women's World Cup in Canada, coinciding with the expansion of the tournament to 24 teams from 16.

== Notable World Cup hat-tricks ==
- Carolina Morace was the first player to score a hat-trick in a World Cup match, on 17 November 1991 against Chinese Taipei.
- The only hat trick in a Final was scored by Carli Lloyd of the United States in the 2015 final against Japan. This is also the only hat-trick in any World Cup final in normal time, as the only men's World Cup final hat-tricks weren't completed until extra time.
- Michelle Akers and Alex Morgan are the only players in World Cup history to have scored five goals in a single match. Akers did this during the 1991 FIFA Women's World Cup match between the United States and Chinese Taipei. Morgan did this during the 2019 FIFA Women's World Cup between the United States and Thailand in group play.
- There have been four occasions when two hat-tricks have been scored in the same match.
  - 1999 FIFA Women's World Cup: Brazil defeated Mexico, with Sissi and Pretinha, both playing for Brazil, scoring three goals.
  - 2007 FIFA Women's World Cup: Germany defeated Argentina, Birgit Prinz and Sandra Smisek scoring hat-tricks for Germany.
  - 2015 FIFA Women's World Cup: Germany defeated the Ivory Coast, Célia Šašić and Anja Mittag scoring hat-tricks for Germany, making Germany the only nation with two two-hat-trick games.
  - 2015 FIFA Women's World Cup: Switzerland defeated Ecuador, Fabienne Humm and Ramona Bachmann scoring six of Switzerland's 10 goals.
- The briefest hat-trick to be completed — that is, the shortest time between the first and third goals — is the one by Swiss Fabienne Humm in 2015 against Ecuador. She scored at 47', 49', and 52', making the time between her first and third just 5 minutes.
- The quickest hat-trick is by Carli Lloyd, scoring at 3', 5' and 16', playing for the United States in the 2015 Final against Japan. This is also the quickest hat-trick in any World Cup match, as the quickest men's World Cup hat-trick wasn't completed until the 24th minute.
- The longest hat-tricks to be completed — most time between the first and third goals — are the ones by Norwegian Ann Kristin Aarønes in 1995 against Canada and by Norwegian Sophie Román Haug in 2023 against the Philippines. Aarønes scored at 4', 21', and 90+3', and Román Haug scored at 6', 16', and 90+5', making the time between their first and third goals 89 minutes.
- The youngest player to score a hat-trick is Inka Grings at 20 years and 236 days.
- The oldest player to score a hat-trick is Cristiane at 34 years and 25 days.

== List of World Cup hat-tricks ==
Key
Player's team lost the match
Player's team drew the match

FIFA Women's World Cup hat-tricks
#	Tournament	Player	Number and time of goals	For	Result	Against	Round	Date	Ref
1	1991, China	Carolina Morace	3 – 37', 52', 66'	Italy	5–0	Chinese Taipei	Group stage	17 November 1991	
2	1991, China	Michelle Akers	5 – 8', 29', 33', 44' (pen.), 48'	United States	7–0	Chinese Taipei	Quarterfinals	24 November 1991	
3	1991, China	Carin Jennings	3 – 10', 22', 33'	United States	5–2	Germany	Semi-finals	27 November 1991	
4	1995, Sweden	Kristin Sandberg	3 – 30', 44', 82'	Norway	8–0	Nigeria	Group stage	6 June 1995	
5	1995, Sweden	Ann Kristin Aarønes	3 – 4', 21', 90+3'	Norway	7–0	Canada	Group stage	10 June 1995	
6	1999, United States	Sissi	3 – 29', 42', 50'	Brazil	7–1	Mexico	Group stage	19 June 1999	
7	1999, United States	Pretinha	3 – 3', 12', 90+1'	Brazil	7–1	Mexico	Group stage	19 June 1999	
8	1999, United States	Sun Wen	3 – 9', 21', 54'	China	7–0	Ghana	Group stage	23 June 1999	
9	1999, United States	Inka Grings	3 – 10', 57', 90+2'	Germany	6–0	Mexico	Group stage	24 June 1999	
10	2003, United States	Mio Otani	3 – 72', 75', 80'	Japan	6–0	Argentina	Group stage	20 September 2003	
11	2007, China	Birgit Prinz	3 – 29', 45+1', 59'	Germany	11–0	Argentina	Group stage	10 September 2007	
12	2007, China	Sandra Smisek	3 – 57', 70', 79'	Germany	11–0	Argentina	Group stage	10 September 2007	
13	2007, China	Ragnhild Gulbrandsen	3 – 39', 59', 62'	Norway	7–2	Ghana	Group stage	20 September 2007	
14	2011, Germany	Homare Sawa	3 – 13', 39', 80'	Japan	4–0	Mexico	Group stage	1 July 2011	
15	2015, Canada	Celia Šašić	3 – 3', 14', 31'	Germany	10–0	Ivory Coast	Group stage	7 June 2015	
16	2015, Canada	Anja Mittag	3 – 29', 35', 64'	Germany	10–0	Ivory Coast	Group stage	7 June 2015	
17	2015, Canada	Gaëlle Enganamouit	3 – 36', 73', 90+4' (pen.)	Cameroon	6–0	Ecuador	Group stage	8 June 2015	
18	2015, Canada	Fabienne Humm	3 – 47', 49', 52'	Switzerland	10–1	Ecuador	Group stage	12 June 2015	
19	2015, Canada	Ramona Bachmann	3 – 60' (pen.), 61', 81'	Switzerland	10–1	Ecuador	Group stage	12 June 2015	
20	2015, Canada	Carli Lloyd	3 – 3', 5', 16'	United States	5–2	Japan	Final	5 July 2015	
21	2019, France	Cristiane	3 – 15', 50', 64'	Brazil	3–0	Jamaica	Group stage	9 June 2019	
22	2019, France	Alex Morgan	5 – 12', 53', 74', 81', 87'	United States	13–0	Thailand	Group stage	11 June 2019	
23	2019, France	Cristiana Girelli	3 – 12' (pen.), 25', 46'	Italy	5–0	Jamaica	Group stage	14 June 2019	
24	2019, France	Sam Kerr	4 – 11', 42', 69', 83'	Australia	4–1	Jamaica	Group stage	18 June 2019	
25	2023, Australia/New Zealand	Ary Borges	3 – 19', 39', 70'	Brazil	4–0	Panama	Group stage	24 July 2023	
26	2023, Australia/New Zealand	Sophie Román Haug	3 – 6', 16', 90+5'	Norway	6–0	Philippines	Group stage	30 July 2023	
27	2023, Australia/New Zealand	Kadidiatou Diani	3 – 28', 37' (pen.), 52' (pen.)	France	6–3	Panama	Group stage	2 August 2023	

== See also ==
- List of FIFA Confederations Cup hat-tricks
- List of FIFA World Cup hat-tricks
