= Homos (footballer) =

Egyptian footballer (born 1979)

Mohamed Homos
Personal information
- Full name: Mohamed Soliman Zaki
- Date of birth: 1 January 1979 (age 47)
- Place of birth: Ismailia, Egypt
- Height: 1.83 m (6 ft 0 in)
- Position: Midfielder

Youth career
- 1994–1997: Ismaily

Senior career*
Years	Team	Apps	(Gls)
1997–2014	Ismaily	241	(46)
2014–2015	Wadi Degla	21	(1)

International career
2000–2010	Egypt	21	(1)

Managerial career
- 2016–2016: Dhofar (Assist. Manager)
- 2017–2018: Al-Nasr (Assist. Manager)
- 2019–2020: El Qanah (Assist. Manager)
- 2020–2020: Ismaily SC (Caretaker Manager)
- 2020–2020: Ismaily SC (Assist. Manager)
- * Club domestic league appearances and goals

Mohamed Soliman Zaki (Arabic: محمد سليمان زكي; born 1 January 1979) commonly known as Mohamed Homos (Arabic: محمد حمص) or simply Homos (Arabic: حمص), is an Egyptian former professional footballer. A midfielder, he played for Ismaily for most of his career.

== Career ==
With the Egyptian national team played in the 2009 FIFA Confederations Cup, he scored his first ever and only international goal from a header in Egypt's second game of the group stage against Italy, giving the reigning African champions a 1–0 win over the reigning world champions. After the match, he was named Man of the Match by the FIFA Technical Study Group (TSG).

== Career statistics ==
#	Date	Venue	Opponent	Score	Result	Competition
1.	18 June 2009	Ellis Park Stadium, Johannesburg, South Africa	Italy	1–0	1–0	2009 FIFA Confederations Cup

== Managerial statistics ==
As of match played 11 September 2020

Managerial record by team and tenure
Team	From	To	Record					Ref.
Team	From	To	P	W	D	L	Win %	Ref.
Ismaily SC (Caretaker)	4 September 2020	11 September 2020	2	1	0	1	50.0	
Total			2	1	0	1	50.0	—

== Honours ==
Ismaily

- Egypt Cup: 1997, 2000
