= Mohamed Obaid Al-Zahiri =

Emirati footballer (born 1967)

Mohamed Obaid Hilal Al-Zahiri
Personal information
- Date of birth: 1 August 1967 (age 59)
- Place of birth: United Arab Emirates
- Position: Defender

International career
Years	Team	Apps	(Gls)
1984–2000	United Arab Emirates	62	(3)

Mohamed Obaid Hilal Al-Zahiri is an Emirati football player. He played as a defender for United Arab Emirates in the 1984 Asian Cup. He scored an own goal in the 1997 FIFA Confederations Cup.
