= 1999 FIFA Confederations Cup final =

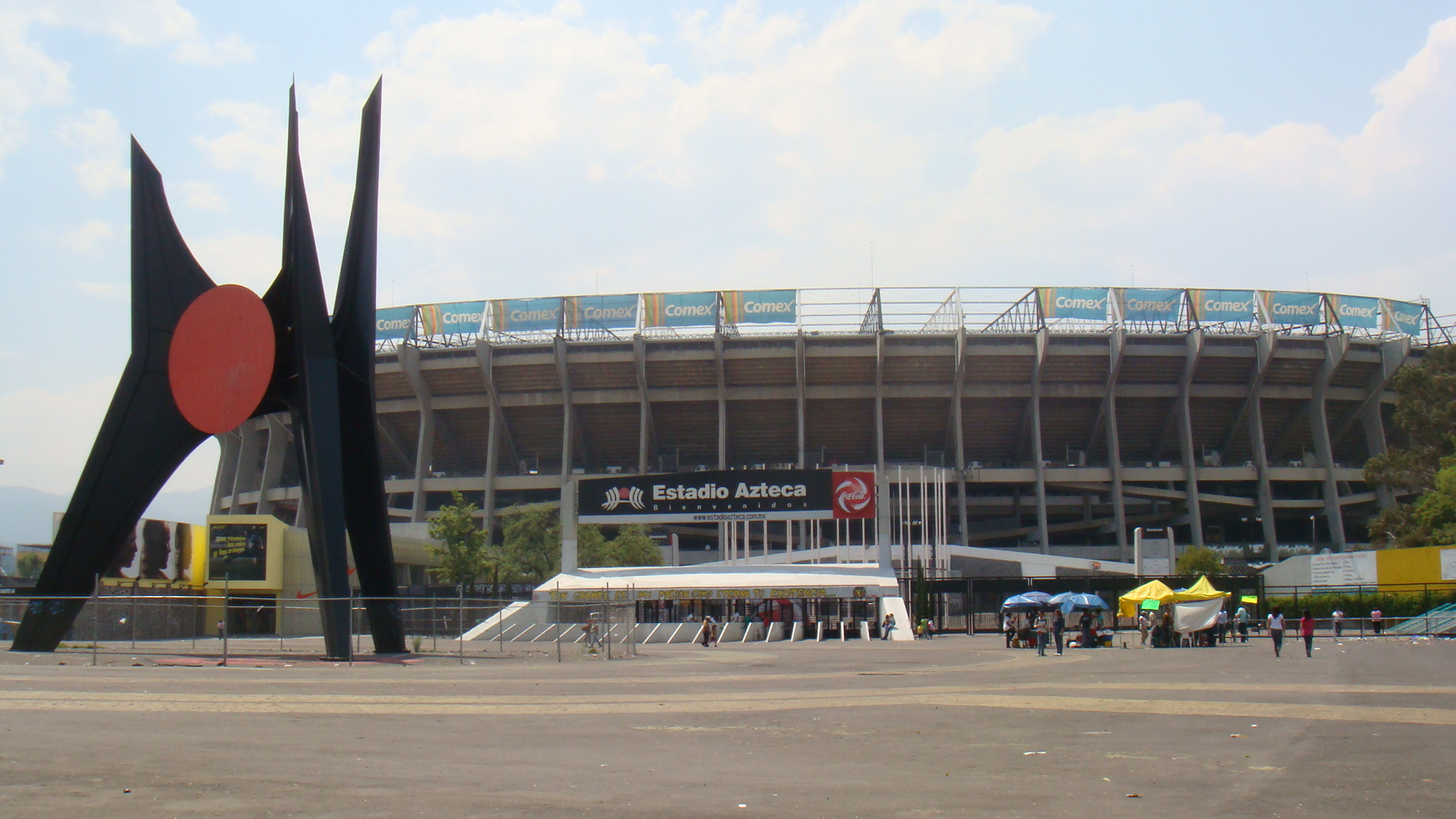
- The Estadio Azteca hosted the final.
- Event: 1999 FIFA Confederations Cup
| Mexico | Brazil |
| (Mexico) | (Brazil) |
| 4 | 3 |
- Date: 4 August 1999
- Venue: Estadio Azteca, Mexico City
- Referee: Anders Frisk (Sweden)
- Attendance: 110,000

The 1999 FIFA Confederations Cup final was a football match to determine the winners of the 1999 FIFA Confederations Cup, was the fourth FIFA Confederations Cup, and the second organised by FIFA, a quadrennial international men's football tournament organised by FIFA. The match was held at the Estadio Azteca in Mexico City, on 4 August 1999, and was contested by the winners of the semi-finals, Mexico and Brazil.

Mexico won the match 4–3, earning their first title in history and being the first CONCACAF team to win the tournament.

== Background ==
This was the first time Mexico had defeated Brazil in a FIFA tournament final. Prior to the tournament, Mexico never won a major FIFA tournament, but came close to in the second edition (also the last edition) of the King Fahd Cup, ending up in third place, under Denmark and Argentina.

For Brazil, this was their second and consecutive final after beating Australia in the 1997 Confederations Cup Final, making them the first team to win the tournament, since FIFA took over the King Fahd Cup.

=== Mexico ===
This marked the first time Mexico qualified to the tournament final, and the first time a CONCACAF representative would reach the final.

In their tournament debut, Mexico won 5–1 in their first match against Saudi Arabia. Later, they tied in a disappointing game 2–2 against Egypt, that got a dramatic equalizer in the last five minutes. For their last group stage match, Bolivia were their rivals, beating them 1–0 in the 52nd minute, that gave Mexico a total of seven points. Then in the semi-finals, United States stood in Mexico's way, but were later defeated 1–0 by golden goal, scored in the 97' minute that gave Mexico the first ticket to the final.

=== Brazil ===
Meanwhile, this was the second consecutive final for Brazil. They were looking forward on winning their second Confederations Cup, repeating like in the 1997 edition.

The defending champions made their tournament debut with a 4–0 win over a surprisingly disappointing Germany. Then won against United States with only a 1–0 win. Later, they finished on top of their group with nine points after they defeated New Zealand 2–0. In the semi-finals, they astonishingly beat Saudi Arabia 8–2 to send them to their 2nd straight final.

== Route to the final ==
Mexico
Round
Brazil
Opponent
Result
Group stage
Opponent
Result
Saudi Arabia
5–1
Match 1
Germany
4–0
Egypt
2–2
Match 2
United States
1–0
Bolivia
1–0
Match 3
New Zealand
2–0

| Team | Pld | W | D | L | GF | GA | GD | Pts |
|---|---|---|---|---|---|---|---|---|
| Mexico | 3 | 2 | 1 | 0 | 8 | 3 | 5 | 7 |
| Saudi Arabia | 3 | 1 | 1 | 1 | 6 | 6 | 0 | 4 |
| Bolivia | 3 | 0 | 2 | 1 | 2 | 3 | -1 | 2 |
| Egypt | 3 | 0 | 2 | 1 | 5 | 9 | –4 | 2 |

Final standing

| Team | Pld | W | D | L | GF | GA | GD | Pts |
|---|---|---|---|---|---|---|---|---|
| Brazil | 3 | 3 | 0 | 0 | 7 | 0 | 7 | 9 |
| United States | 3 | 2 | 0 | 1 | 4 | 2 | 2 | 6 |
| Germany | 3 | 1 | 0 | 2 | 2 | 6 | -4 | 3 |
| New Zealand | 3 | 0 | 0 | 3 | 1 | 6 | –5 | 0 |

Opponent
Result
Knockout stage
Opponent
Result
United States
1–0 (a.e.t)
Semi-Final
Saudi Arabia
8–2

== Match ==
=== Details ===
4 August 1999
21:00

| Mexico | 4–3 | Brazil |
|---|---|---|
| Zepeda 13', 51'; Abundis 28'; Blanco 62' | Report | Serginho 43' (pen.); Rôni 47'; Zé Roberto 63' |

Estadio Azteca, Mexico City
Attendance: 110,000
Referee: Anders Frisk (Sweden)

| Mexico | Brazil |

| GK | 1 | Jorge Campos |
| CB | 18 | Salvador Carmona |
| CB | 4 | Rafael Márquez | (yellow card) 21' |
| CB | 2 | Claudio Suárez (c) | (yellow card) 74' |
| RM | 19 | Miguel Zepeda | | (substituted off) 83' |
| CM | 13 | Pável Pardo |
| CM | 6 | Germán Villa |
| LM | 7 | Ramón Ramírez |
| AM | 10 | Cuauhtémoc Blanco | (yellow card) 50' |
| CF | 9 | José Manuel Abundis | (yellow card) 11' |
| CF | 17 | Francisco Palencia | | (substituted off) 70' |
Substitutions:
| DF | 14 | Isaac Terrazas | | (substituted on) 70' |
| MF | 16 | Jesús Arellano | | (substituted on) 83' |
Manager:
(Mexico) Manuel Lapuente

| GK | 1 | Dida |
| RB | 8 | Emerson (c) |
| CB | 3 | Odvan |
| CB | 4 | João Carlos | (yellow card) 46' (yellow-red card) 90+2' |
| LB | 6 | Serginho |
| CM | 20 | Vampeta |
| CM | 5 | Flávio Conceição |
| RW | 10 | Alex |
| AM | 17 | Beto | | (substituted off) 46' |
| LW | 11 | Zé Roberto | (yellow card) 5' | (substituted off) 82' |
| CF | 7 | Ronaldinho |
Substitutions:
| FW | 18 | Rôni | | (substituted on) 46' |
| FW | 19 | Warley | | (substituted on) 82' |
Manager:
(Brazil) Vanderlei Luxemburgo

Assistant referees:
Fernando Treasco Gracia (Spain)
Awni Hassouneh (Jordan)
