= FIFA Confederations Cup =

- Organiser(s): FIFA
- Founded: 1992
- Abolished: 2017; 9 years ago
- Region: International
- Teams: 8 (from 6 confederations)
- Last champions: Germany (1st title)
- Most championships: Brazil (4 titles)
- Website: fifa.com/confederationscup

The FIFA Confederations Cup was an international association football tournament for men's national teams, held every four years by FIFA. It was contested by the holders of each of the six continental championships (AFC, CAF, CONCACAF, CONMEBOL, OFC, and UEFA), along with the current FIFA World Cup holder and the host nation, to bring the number of teams up to eight.

Between 2001 and 2017 (with an exception in 2003), the tournament was held in the country that would host the World Cup the following year, acting as a test event for the larger tournament.

The last champions were Germany, who won the 2017 FIFA Confederations Cup by defeating Chile 1–0 in the final to win their first title.

In March 2019, FIFA confirmed that the tournament would no longer be staged, with its slot replaced by an expansion of the FIFA Club World Cup, as well as the 2021 FIFA Arab Cup, as a prelude to the 2022 FIFA World Cup.

== History ==
=== King Fahd Cup ===
The tournament was originally organized by and held in Saudi Arabia, contested in 1992 and 1995 by the Saudi national side and some continental champions. Contested as the King Fahd Cup (Confederations Winners Cup or Intercontinental Championship), it was named in honor of the then Saudi ruler who organized the tournament with the help of his country's federation.

=== Confederations Cup era ===
In 1997, FIFA took over the organization of the tournament, named it the FIFA Confederations Cup and staged the competition every two years and recognized the first two editions in 1997.

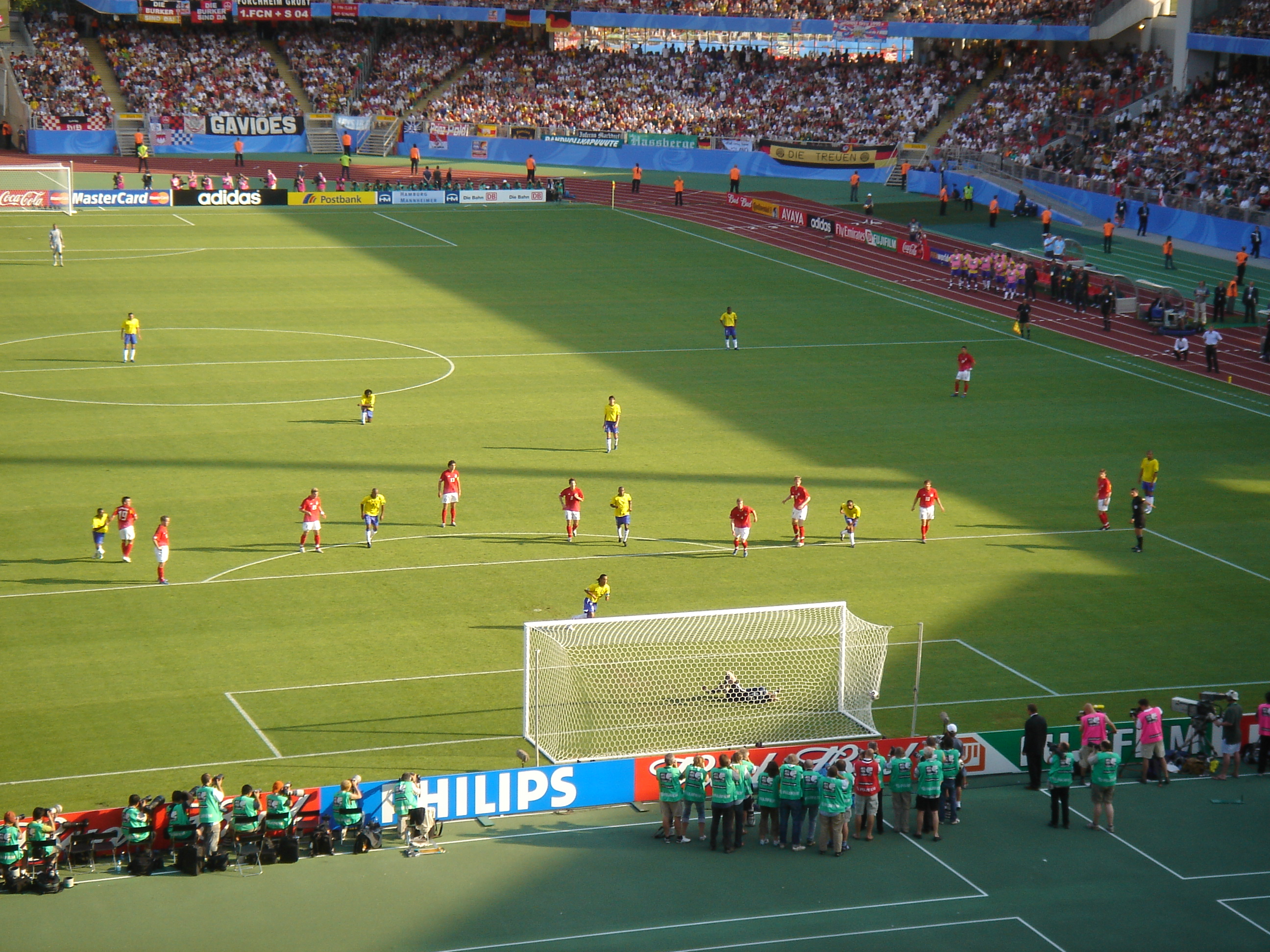
Germany (red shirt) v Brazil at the Frankenstadion, 2005

After 2005, it was held every four years, in the year prior to each World Cup in the host country of the forthcoming World Cup (the 2001 edition was hosted in South Korea and Japan, before the quadrennial pattern was established). Considered a dress rehearsal for the World Cup it precedes, it used around half of the stadiums intended for use at the following year's competition and gave the host nation, which qualified for that tournament automatically, experience at a high level of competition during the two years. At the same time, participation was made optional for the South American and European champions.

Generally, the host nation, the World Cup holders, and the six continental champions qualified for the competition. In those cases where a team meets more than one of the qualification criteria (such as the 2001 tournament where France qualified as the World Cup champions and European champions), another team was invited to participate, often the runner-up in a competition that the extra-qualified team won.

On four occasions teams have chosen not to participate in the tournament. Germany did so twice, in 1997 (replaced by Euro 1996 runners-up Czech Republic) and in 2003 when Germany were awarded a place as the 2002 World Cup runners-up, replaced by the third-placed team Turkey. World champions France declined a place in the 1999 Confederations Cup, replaced by Brazil, the 1998 World Cup runners-up. Italy, UEFA Euro 2000 runners up, declined their place in the 2003 FIFA Confederations Cup.

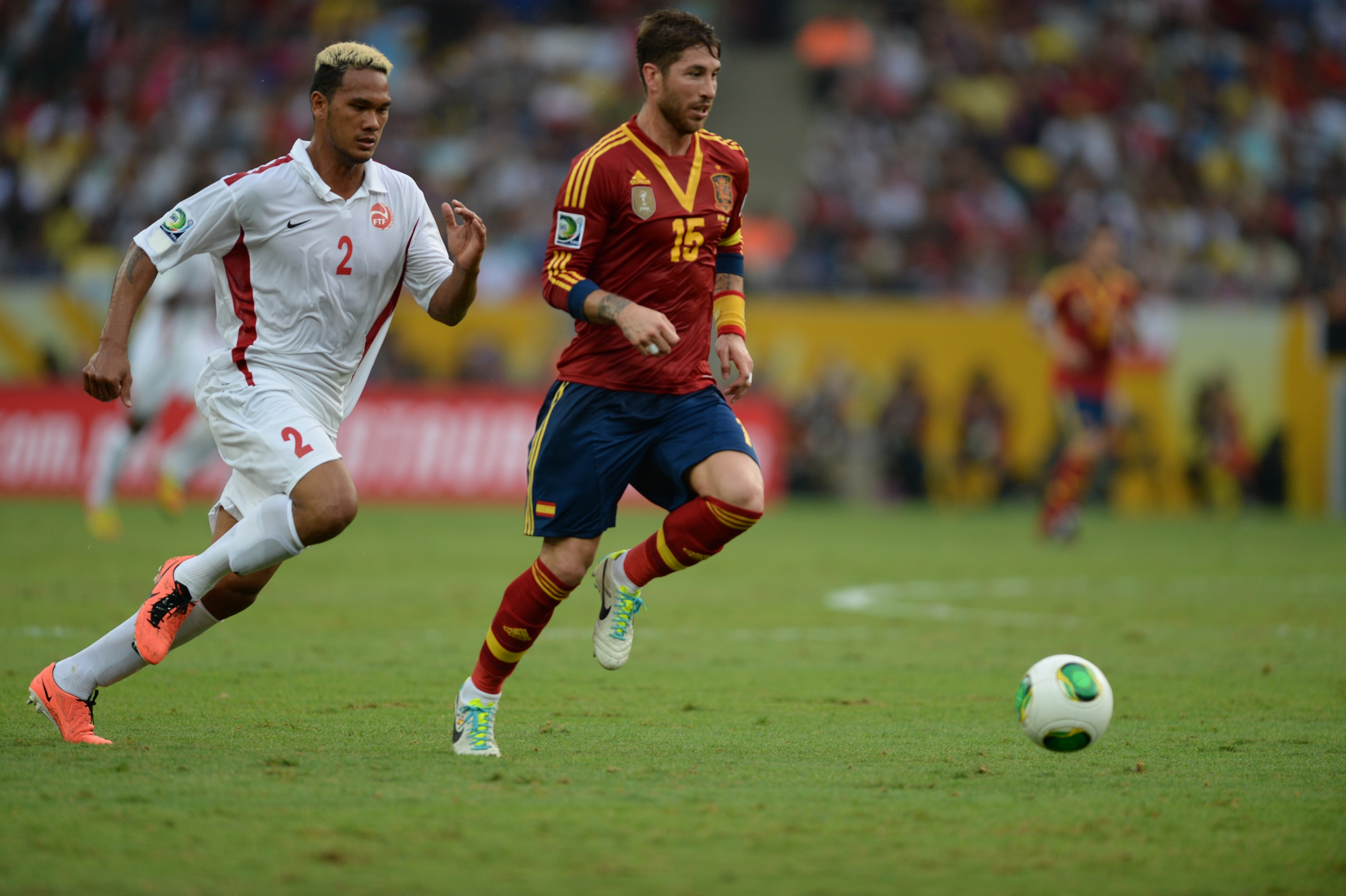
Spain v Tahiti in 2013

An earlier tournament that invited former World Cup winners, the 1980 Mundialito, celebrated the fiftieth anniversary of the first World Cup. The Artemio Franchi Trophy, contested in 1985 and 1993 between the winners of the Copa América and UEFA European Championship, was another example of an earlier contest between football confederations. Both of these are considered by some to be a form of unofficial precursor to the Confederations Cup, although FIFA recognised only the 1992 tournaments onwards to be Confederations Cup winners.

=== 2021 tournament and abolition ===
The 2021 tournament was originally to be held in Qatar, the host country of the 2022 FIFA World Cup, as announced on 2 December 2010 after the country was awarded the hosting rights of the 2022 FIFA World Cup. However, concerns arose surrounding Qatar's high temperatures during the summer period (which also led to calls for the World Cup to be moved from its traditional June–July scheduling to November–December).

On 25 February 2015, this resulted in FIFA officially announcing that it would move the 2021 Confederations Cup to another country of the Asian Football Confederation, so it could still be held during the traditional window of June/July 2021, without interrupting domestic leagues. As compensation, another FIFA tournament, potentially the 2021 FIFA Club World Cup, could be held in Qatar in November–December 2021, as the test event for the 2022 World Cup.

In October 2017, FIFA divulged plans to abolish the Confederations Cup by 2021 and replace it with a quadrennial, 24-team FIFA Club World Cup and move the latter tournament from December to June. On 15 March 2019, FIFA announced that the Confederations Cup would be abolished, with an expanded FIFA Club World Cup taking place instead.

=== Present ===
In July 2021, UEFA president Aleksander Čeferin and CONMEBOL president Alejandro Domínguez began efforts to launch a competition including the winners of the Copa America and the European Championship. The idea is to have the European Championship and Copa America both be played two years ahead of the World Cup, with the new tournament played a year before the World Cup in the nation that will host the World Cup. An edition of the tournament was considered for 2022, and on 1 June 2022, Argentina beat Italy in the 2022 Finalissima, a relaunch of the CONMEBOL–UEFA Cup of Champions.

== Format ==
The eight qualified teams were drawn into two round-robin groups: two teams from the same confederation could not be drawn in a group, except if there were three teams from the same confederation (something that only happened in the 2017 edition when hosts Russia were joined by World Cup champions Germany and European champions Portugal). Every team played all other teams in their group once, for three matches.

The top two teams of each group advanced to the semi-finals, with the winners of each group playing the runners-up of the other group. The rankings of teams in each group were determined as follows (regulations Article 19.6):

1. points obtained in all group matches;
2. goal difference in all group matches;
3. number of goals scored in all group matches;

If two or more teams were equal on the basis of the above three criteria, their rankings were determined as follows:

4. points obtained in the group matches between the teams concerned;
5. goal difference in the group matches between the teams concerned;
6. number of goals scored in the group matches between the teams concerned;
7. fair play points
  - first yellow card: minus 1 point;
  - indirect red card (second yellow card): minus 3 points;
  - direct red card: minus 4 points;
  - yellow card and direct red card: minus 5 points;
8. drawing of lots by the FIFA Organising Committee.

The winners of the semi-finals advanced to the final, while the losers played in the third-place game. For the knockout stage, if the score was drawn at the end of regular time, extra time was played (two periods of 15 minutes each) and followed, if necessary, by a penalty shoot-out to determine the winner.

== Results ==
=== FIFA Confederations Cup ===
The first two editions were known as the King Fahd Cup. FIFA later recognized them retroactively as Confederations Cup editions.

Ed.	Year	Host	First place game			Third place game			No. of Teams
Ed.	Year	Host	(gold) Champions	Score	(silver) Runners-up	(bronze) Third place	Score	Fourth place	No. of Teams
1	1992	Saudi Arabia	Argentina	3–1	Saudi Arabia	United States	5–2	Ivory Coast	4
2	1995	Saudi Arabia	Denmark	2–0	Argentina	Mexico	1–1 (a.e.t.) (5–4 p)	Nigeria	6
3	1997	Saudi Arabia	Brazil	6–0	Australia	Czech Republic	1–0	Uruguay	8
4	1999	Mexico	Mexico	4–3	Brazil	United States	2–0	Saudi Arabia	8
5	2001	South Korea; Japan	France	1–0	Japan	Australia	1–0	Brazil	8
6	2003	France	France	1–0 (a.e.t./g.g.)	Cameroon	Turkey	2–1	Colombia	8
7	2005	Germany	Brazil	4–1	Argentina	Germany	4–3 (a.e.t.)	Mexico	8
8	2009	South Africa	Brazil	3–2	United States	Spain	3–2 (a.e.t.)	South Africa	8
9	2013	Brazil	Brazil	3–0	Spain	Italy	2–2 (a.e.t.) (3–2 p)	Uruguay	8
10	2017	Russia	Germany	1–0	Chile	Portugal	2–1 (a.e.t.)	Mexico	8

=== Teams reaching the top four ===
Team	Titles	Runners-up	Third place	Fourth place	Top 4 total
Brazil	4 (1997, 2005, 2009, 2013*)	1 (1999)		1 (2001)	6
France	2 (2001, 2003*)				2
Argentina	1 (1992)	2 (1995, 2005)			3
Mexico	1 (1999*)		1 (1995)	2 (2005, 2017)	4
Germany	1 (2017)		1 (2005*)		2
Denmark	1 (1995)				1
United States		1 (2009)	2 (1992, 1999)		3
Australia		1 (1997)	1 (2001)		2
Spain		1 (2013)	1 (2009)		2
Saudi Arabia		1 (1992*)		1 (1999)	2
Japan		1 (2001*)			1
Cameroon		1 (2003)			1
Chile		1 (2017)			1
Czech Republic			1 (1997)		1
Turkey			1 (2003)		1
Italy			1 (2013)		1
Portugal			1 (2017)		1
Uruguay				2 (1997, 2013)	2
Ivory Coast				1 (1992)	1
Nigeria				1 (1995)	1
Colombia				1 (2003)	1
South Africa				1 (2009*)	1

* hosts

== Records and statistics ==
=== Individual records ===
==== Top goalscorer in single tournament ====
7 goals, Romário of Brazil in 1997

==== Overall top goalscorers ====
Player	Country	Goals
Ronaldinho	Brazil	9
Cuauhtémoc Blanco	Mexico	9
Fernando Torres	Spain	8
Adriano	Brazil	7
Romário	Brazil	7
Marzouk Al-Otaibi	Saudi Arabia	6
David Villa	Spain	6
Alex	Brazil	5
John Aloisi	Australia	5
Luís Fabiano	Brazil	5
Fred	Brazil	5
Robert Pires	France	5
Vladimír Šmicer	Czech Republic	5

== Awards ==
Tournament	Golden Ball	Golden Boot	Goals	Golden Glove	FIFA Fair Play Trophy
(Saudi Arabia) 1992	(Argentina) Fernando Redondo	(Argentina) Gabriel Batistuta (United States) Bruce Murray	2	Not awarded	Not awarded
(Saudi Arabia) 1995	(Denmark) Brian Laudrup	(Mexico) Luis García	3	Not awarded	Not awarded
(Saudi Arabia) 1997	(Brazil) Denílson	(Brazil) Romário	7	Not awarded	South Africa
(Mexico) 1999	(Brazil) Ronaldinho	(Brazil) Ronaldinho	6	Not awarded	Brazil; New Zealand
(South Korea) (Japan) 2001	(France) Robert Pires	(France) Robert Pires	2	Not awarded	Japan
(France) 2003	(France) Thierry Henry	(France) Thierry Henry	4	Not awarded	Japan
(Germany) 2005	(Brazil) Adriano	(Brazil) Adriano	5	(Mexico) Oswaldo Sánchez	Greece
(South Africa) 2009	(Brazil) Kaká	(Brazil) Luís Fabiano	5	(United States) Tim Howard	Brazil
(Brazil) 2013	(Brazil) Neymar	(Spain) Fernando Torres	5	(Brazil) Júlio César	Spain
(Russia) 2017	(Germany) Julian Draxler	(Germany) Timo Werner	3	(Chile) Claudio Bravo	Germany
