= 2001 FIFA Confederations Cup final =

- Event: 2001 FIFA Confederations Cup
Japan	France
(Japan)	(France)
0	1
- Date: 10 June 2001
- Venue: International Stadium Yokohama, Yokohama
- Referee: Ali Bujsaim (United Arab Emirates)
- Attendance: 65,533

The 2001 FIFA Confederations Cup final was a football match to determine the winners of the 2001 FIFA Confederations Cup. The match was held at International Stadium Yokohama, Yokohama, Japan, on 10 June 2001 and was contested by Japan and France. France won the match 1–0 with the only goal coming after half an hour, when Patrick Vieira headed in over the advancing keeper Yoshikatsu Kawaguchi from the edge of the penalty area after a long pass from Frank Leboeuf in midfield. This was Japan's first ever final in a senior FIFA competition, and as of 2022, it is also the one of only three senior FIFA finals to feature an AFC team.

== Route to the final ==
Japan
Round
France
Opponent
Result
Group stage
Opponent
Result
Canada
3–0
Match 1
South Korea
5–0
Cameroon
2–0
Match 2
Australia
0–1
Brazil
0–0
Match 3
Mexico
4–0

Team	Pld	W	D	L	GF	GA	GD	Pts
Japan	3	2	1	0	5	0	5	7
Brazil	3	1	2	0	2	0	2	5
Cameroon	3	1	0	2	2	4	−2	3
Canada	3	0	1	2	0	5	−5	1

Final standing

Team	Pld	W	D	L	GF	GA	GD	Pts
France	3	2	0	1	9	1	8	6
Australia	3	2	0	1	3	3	1	6
South Korea	3	2	0	1	3	6	−3	6
Mexico	3	0	0	3	1	8	−7	0

Opponent
Result
Knockout stage
Opponent
Result
Australia
1–0
Semi-final
Brazil
2–1

== Match details ==
10 June 2001
19:00 JST

Japan	0–1	France
	Report	Vieira 30'

International Stadium Yokohama, Yokohama
Attendance: 65,533
Referee: Ali Bujsaim (United Arab Emirates)

Japan	France

GK	1	Yoshikatsu Kawaguchi
RB	20	Yasuhiro Hato
CB	4	Ryuzo Morioka (c)
CB	3	Naoki Matsuda	(yellow card) 36'
LB	16	Kōji Nakata
RM	14	Teruyoshi Ito
CM	5	Junichi Inamoto		(substituted off) 46'
CM	18	Kazuyuki Toda
LM	21	Shinji Ono		(substituted off) 60'
CF	8	Hiroaki Morishima	(yellow card) 89'
CF	9	Akinori Nishizawa		(substituted off) 74'
Substitutions:
MF	10	Atsuhiro Miura		(substituted on) 46'
FW	19	Tatsuhiko Kubo		(substituted on) 60'
FW	11	Masashi Nakayama		(substituted on) 74'
Manager:
(France) Philippe Troussier

GK	1	Ulrich Ramé
RB	19	Christian Karembeu
CB	18	Frank Leboeuf
CB	8	Marcel Desailly (c)
LB	3	Bixente Lizarazu	(yellow card) 52'
RM	6	Youri Djorkaeff		(substituted off) 65'
CM	4	Patrick Vieira
CM	7	Robert Pires
LM	11	Sylvain Wiltord
CF	9	Nicolas Anelka
CF	17	Steve Marlet		(substituted off) 58'
Substitutions:
FW	22	Laurent Robert		(substituted on) 58'
MF	10	Eric Carrière		(substituted on) 65'
Manager:
(France) Roger Lemerre

Assistant referees:
Igor Šramka (Slovakia)
Awni Hassouneh (Jordan)
