= 2009 FIFA Confederations Cup =

8th FIFA Confederations Cup, held in South Africa

FIFA Sokker-Konfederasiebeker in 2009

Tournament details
- Host country: South Africa
- Dates: 14–28 June
- Teams: 8 (from 6 confederations)
- Venue: 4 (in 4 host cities)

Final positions
- Champions: Brazil (3rd title)
- Runners-up: United States
- Third place: Spain
- Fourth place: South Africa

Tournament statistics
- Matches played: 16
- Goals scored: 44 (2.75 per match)
- Attendance: 584,894 (36,556 per match)
- Top scorer: (Brazil) Luís Fabiano (5 goals)
- Best player: (Brazil) Kaká
- Best goalkeeper: (United States) Tim Howard
- Fair play award: Brazil

The 2009 FIFA Confederations Cup was the eighth Confederations Cup, and was held in South Africa from 14 June to 28 June 2009, as a prelude to the 2010 FIFA World Cup. The draw was held on 22 November 2008 at the Sandton Convention Centre in Johannesburg. The opening match and the final was played at Ellis Park Stadium in Johannesburg. The tournament was won by Brazil, who retained the trophy they won in 2005 by defeating the United States 3–2 in the final.

== Qualified teams ==
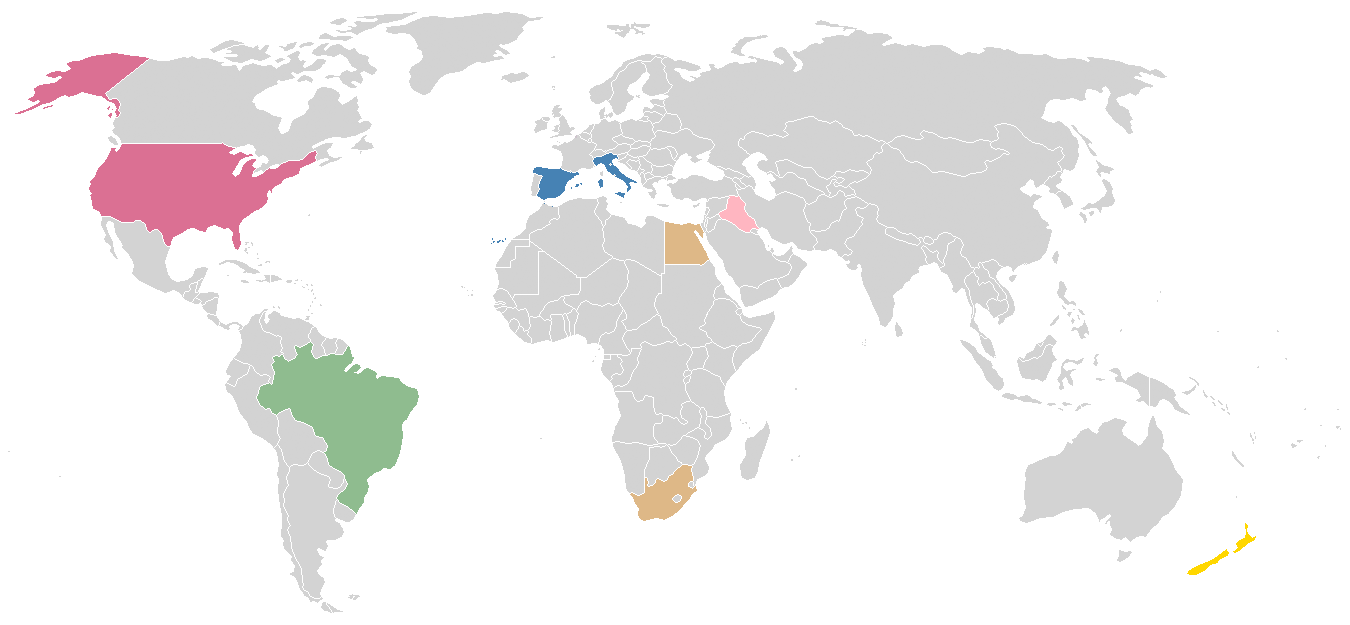
2009 FIFA Confederations Cup participating teams

Team	Confederation	Qualification method	Date qualification secured	Participation no.
South Africa	CAF	Hosts	15 May 2004	2nd
Italy	UEFA	2006 FIFA World Cup winners	9 July 2006	1st
United States	CONCACAF	2007 CONCACAF Gold Cup winners	24 June 2007	4th
Brazil	CONMEBOL	2007 Copa América winners	15 July 2007	6th
Iraq	AFC	2007 AFC Asian Cup winners	29 July 2007	1st
Egypt	CAF	2008 Africa Cup of Nations winners	10 February 2008	2nd
Spain	UEFA	UEFA Euro 2008 winners	29 June 2008	1st
New Zealand	OFC	2008 OFC Nations Cup winners	19 November 2008	3rd

== Draw ==
The draw for the competition was held on 22 November 2008 at the Sandton Convention Centre in Johannesburg. Each team was represented in the draw by its competitor in the Miss World 2008 competition, except for Iraq, which was represented by Miss World 2007, Zhang Zilin, from China. The teams were divided into two pots:

- Pot A: South Africa (automatically placed as Team A1), Brazil, Italy, Spain
- Pot B: Egypt, Iraq, New Zealand, United States

Teams from the same confederation were not drawn into the same group, therefore Egypt was drawn into Group B. Also as result, Italy and Spain were drawn into different groups.

== Match ball ==
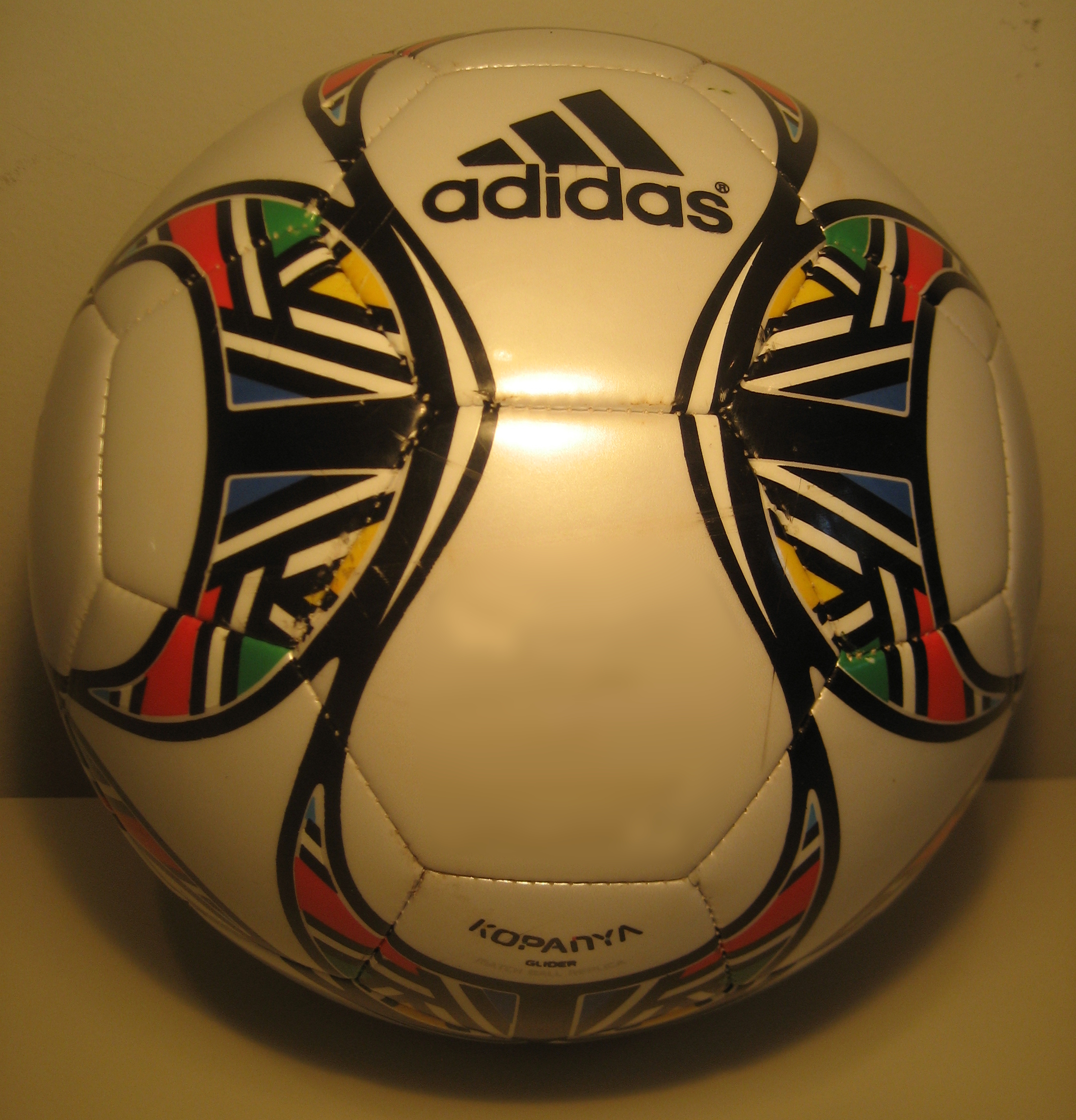
A replica of The Adidas Kopanya (the official match ball of the 2009 FIFA Confederations Cup) with the traditional 32-panel structure. The official match ball has the same structure and surface as the Adidas Europass.

The official match ball for the 2009 FIFA Confederations Cup was the Adidas Kopanya. The name means "bring (or join) together" in Southern Sesotho, one of the 11 official languages of South Africa. The panel configuration of the ball is the same as that of the Teamgeist and Europass balls that came before it. The ball is white, accentuated with bold black lines and detailed with typical Ndebele designs in red, yellow, green and blue.

== Venues ==
Four cities served as the venues for the 2009 FIFA Confederations Cup. All four venues were also used for the 2010 FIFA World Cup.

Johannesburg	Location of the host cities of the 2009 FIFA Confederations Cup.	Pretoria
Ellis Park Stadium	Location of the host cities of the 2009 FIFA Confederations Cup.	Loftus Versfeld Stadium
Capacity: 62,567	Location of the host cities of the 2009 FIFA Confederations Cup.	Capacity: 50,000
Bloemfontein	Location of the host cities of the 2009 FIFA Confederations Cup.	Rustenburg
Free State Stadium	Location of the host cities of the 2009 FIFA Confederations Cup.	Royal Bafokeng Stadium
Capacity: 48,000	Location of the host cities of the 2009 FIFA Confederations Cup.	Capacity: 42,000

Originally, Nelson Mandela Bay Stadium in Port Elizabeth was also chosen as a venue. On 8 July 2008, however, Port Elizabeth withdrew as a host city because its stadium was deemed unlikely to meet the 30 March 2009 deadline for completion. The Nelson Mandela Bay stadium was subsequently completed before the Confederations Cup and was opened on 7 June 2009. It acted as a venue for the 2009 British & Irish Lions tour to South Africa on 16 June. All of these stadia hosted matches during the Lions tour, but a minimum of nine days was allowed for pitch recovery between a rugby match and a Confederations Cup match.

== Match officials ==
The referees were announced on 5 May. Two referee teams (led by Carlos Batres and Carlos Amarilla respectively) withdrew due to injuries. Replacements from the same confederation, led by Benito Archundia and Pablo Pozo, were selected.

Confederation	Referee	Assistants
AFC	Matthew Breeze (Australia)	Matthew Cream (Australia); Ben Wilson (Australia)
CAF	Coffi Codjia (Benin)	Komi Konyoh (Togo); Alexis Fassinou (Benin)
CONCACAF	Benito Archundia (Mexico)	Marvin Torrentera (Mexico); Héctor Vergara (Canada)
CONMEBOL	Pablo Pozo (Chile)	Patricio Basualto (Chile); Francisco Mondria (Chile)
CONMEBOL	Jorge Larrionda (Uruguay)	Pablo Fandiño (Uruguay); Mauricio Espinosa (Uruguay)
OFC	Michael Hester (New Zealand)	Jan Hendrik-Hintz (New Zealand); Mark Rule (New Zealand)
UEFA	Howard Webb (England)	Peter Kirkup (England); Mike Mullarkey (England)
UEFA	Martin Hansson (Sweden)	Henrik Andrén (Sweden); Fredrik Nilsson (Sweden)
UEFA	Massimo Busacca (Switzerland)	Matthias Arnet (Switzerland); Francisco Buragina (Switzerland)

== Group stage ==
Tie-breaking criteria

The ranking of each team in each group was determined as follows:

1. Greatest number of points obtained in all group matches;
2. Goal difference in all group matches;
3. Greatest number of goals scored in all group matches.

Had two or more teams been equal on the basis of the above three criteria, their rankings would have been determined as follows:

1. Greatest number of points obtained in the group matches between the teams concerned;
2. Goal difference resulting from the group matches between the teams concerned;
3. Greater number of goals scored in all group matches between the teams concerned;
4. Drawing of lots by the FIFA Organising Committee.

=== Group A ===
Pos	Team	Pld	W	D	L	GF	GA	GD	Pts	Qualification
1	Spain	3	3	0	0	8	0	+8	9	Advance to knockout stage
2	South Africa (H)	3	1	1	1	2	2	0	4	Advance to knockout stage
3	Iraq	3	0	2	1	0	1	−1	2	
4	New Zealand	3	0	1	2	0	7	−7	1	

Source: FIFA
(H) Hosts
14 June 2009
16:00 SAST

South Africa	0–0	Iraq
	Report

Ellis Park Stadium, Johannesburg
Attendance: 48,837
Referee: Jorge Larrionda (Uruguay)
14 June 2009
20:30 SAST

New Zealand	0–5	Spain
	Report	Torres 6', 14', 17'; Fàbregas 24'; Villa 48'

Royal Bafokeng Stadium, Rustenburg
Attendance: 21,649
Referee: Coffi Codjia (Benin)

17 June 2009
16:00 SAST

Spain	1–0	Iraq
Villa 55'	Report

Free State Stadium, Bloemfontein
Attendance: 30,512
Referee: Matthew Breeze (Australia)
17 June 2009
20:30 SAST

South Africa	2–0	New Zealand
Parker 21', 52'	Report

Royal Bafokeng Stadium, Rustenburg
Attendance: 36,598
Referee: Benito Archundia (Mexico)

20 June 2009
20:30 SAST

Iraq	0–0	New Zealand
	Report

Ellis Park Stadium, Johannesburg
Attendance: 23,295
Referee: Howard Webb (England)
20 June 2009
20:30 SAST

Spain	2–0	South Africa
Villa 52'; Llorente 72'	Report

Free State Stadium, Bloemfontein
Attendance: 38,212
Referee: Pablo Pozo (Chile)

=== Group B ===
Pos	Team	Pld	W	D	L	GF	GA	GD	Pts	
1	Brazil	3	3	0	0	10	3	+7	9	Advance to knockout stage
2	United States	3	1	0	2	4	6	−2	3	Advance to knockout stage
3	Italy	3	1	0	2	3	5	−2	3	
4	Egypt	3	1	0	2	4	7	−3	3	

Source: FIFA
15 June 2009
16:00 SAST

Brazil	4–3	Egypt
Kaká 5', 90+1' (pen.); Luís Fabiano 11'; Juan 37'	Report	Zidan 9', 56'; Shawky 54'

Free State Stadium, Bloemfontein
Attendance: 27,851
Referee: Howard Webb (England)
15 June 2009
20:30 SAST

United States	1–3	Italy
Donovan 41' (pen.)	Report	Rossi 58', 90+4'; De Rossi 72'

Loftus Versfeld Stadium, Pretoria
Attendance: 34,341
Referee: Pablo Pozo (Chile)

18 June 2009
16:00 SAST

United States	0–3	Brazil
	Report	Felipe Melo 7'; Robinho 20'; Maicon 62'

Loftus Versfeld Stadium, Pretoria
Attendance: 39,617
Referee: Massimo Busacca (Switzerland)
18 June 2009
20:30 SAST

Egypt	1–0	Italy
Homos 39'	Report

Ellis Park Stadium, Johannesburg
Attendance: 52,150
Referee: Martin Hansson (Sweden)

21 June 2009
20:30 SAST

Italy	0–3	Brazil
	Report	Luís Fabiano 37', 43'; Dossena 45' (o.g.)

Loftus Versfeld Stadium, Pretoria
Attendance: 41,195
Referee: Benito Archundia (Mexico)
21 June 2009
20:30 SAST

Egypt	0–3	United States
	Report	Davies 21'; Bradley 63'; Dempsey 71'

Royal Bafokeng Stadium, Rustenburg
Attendance: 23,140
Referee: Michael Hester (New Zealand)

== Knockout stage ==
Semi-finals
24 June – Bloemfontein
Spain	0
United States	2
25 June – Johannesburg
Brazil	1
South Africa	0

Final
28 June – Johannesburg
United States	2
Brazil	3
Third place
28 June – Rustenburg
Spain (aet)	3
South Africa	2

=== Semi-finals ===
24 June 2009
20:30 SAST

Spain	0–2	United States
	Report	Altidore 27'; Dempsey 74'

Free State Stadium, Bloemfontein
Attendance: 35,369
Referee: Jorge Larrionda (Uruguay)

25 June 2009
20:30 SAST

Brazil	1–0	South Africa
Dani Alves 88'	Report

Ellis Park Stadium, Johannesburg
Attendance: 48,049
Referee: Massimo Busacca (Switzerland)

=== Match for third place ===
28 June 2009
15:00 SAST

Spain	3–2 (a.e.t.)	South Africa
Güiza 88', 89'; Alonso 107'	Report	Mphela 73', 90+3'

Royal Bafokeng Stadium, Rustenburg
Attendance: 31,788
Referee: Matthew Breeze (Australia)

=== Final ===
28 June 2009
20:30 SAST

United States	2–3	Brazil
Dempsey 10'; Donovan 27'	Report	Luís Fabiano 46', 74'; Lúcio 84'

Ellis Park Stadium, Johannesburg
Attendance: 52,291
Referee: Martin Hansson (Sweden)

== Awards ==
Golden Ball	Golden Shoe
(Brazil) Kaká	(Brazil) Luís Fabiano
Silver Ball	Silver Shoe
(Brazil) Luís Fabiano	(Spain) Fernando Torres
Bronze Ball	Bronze Shoe
(United States) Clint Dempsey	(Spain) David Villa
Golden Glove	FIFA Fair Play Trophy
(United States) Tim Howard	Brazil

Source: FIFA

FIFA.com Users' Top 11
Goalkeeper	Defenders	Midfielders	Forwards
(United States) Tim Howard	(Spain) Joan Capdevila (Spain) Carles Puyol (Brazil) Lúcio (Brazil) Maicon	(Brazil) Kaká (Egypt) Mohamed Aboutrika (United States) Clint Dempsey	(Spain) David Villa (Spain) Fernando Torres (Brazil) Luís Fabiano

Source: FIFA

== Statistics ==
=== Goalscorers ===
Luís Fabiano received the Golden Shoe award for scoring five goals. In total, 44 goals were scored by 27 different players, with only one of them credited as own goal.

5 goals

- (Brazil) Luís Fabiano

3 goals

- (Spain) Fernando Torres
- (Spain) David Villa
- (United States) Clint Dempsey

2 goals

- (Brazil) Kaká
- (Egypt) Mohamed Zidan
- (South Africa) Katlego Mphela
- (South Africa) Bernard Parker
- (Italy) Giuseppe Rossi
- (Spain) Dani Güiza
- (United States) Landon Donovan

1 goal

- (Brazil) Dani Alves
- (Brazil) Felipe Melo
- (Brazil) Juan
- (Brazil) Lúcio
- (Brazil) Maicon
- (Brazil) Robinho
- (Egypt) Homos
- (Egypt) Mohamed Shawky
- (Italy) Daniele De Rossi
- (Spain) Xabi Alonso
- (Spain) Cesc Fàbregas
- (Spain) Fernando Llorente
- (United States) Jozy Altidore
- (United States) Michael Bradley
- (United States) Charlie Davies

Own goal

- (Italy) Andrea Dossena (against Brazil)

=== Tournament ranking ===
Per statistical convention in football, matches decided in extra time are counted as wins and losses, while matches decided by penalty shoot-outs are counted as draws.

Pos	Grp	Team	Pld	W	D	L	GF	GA	GD	Pts	Final result
1	B	Brazil	5	5	0	0	14	5	+9	15	Champions
2	B	United States	5	2	0	3	8	9	−1	6	Runners-up
3	A	Spain	5	4	0	1	11	4	+7	12	Third place
4	A	South Africa (H)	5	1	1	3	4	6	−2	4	Fourth place
5	B	Italy	3	1	0	2	3	5	−2	3	Eliminated in group stage
6	B	Egypt	3	1	0	2	4	7	−3	3	Eliminated in group stage
7	A	Iraq	3	0	2	1	0	1	−1	2	Eliminated in group stage
8	A	New Zealand	3	0	1	2	0	7	−7	1	Eliminated in group stage

Source: FIFA
(H) Hosts

== See also ==
- 2010 FIFA World Cup
