= 1997 FIFA Confederations Cup final =

- Event: 1997 FIFA Confederations Cup
Brazil	Australia
(Brazil)	(Australia)
6	0
- Date: 21 December 1997
- Venue: King Fahd II Stadium, Riyadh
- Referee: Pirom Un-Prasert (Thailand)
- Attendance: 65,000

The 1997 FIFA Confederations Cup final was a football match to determine the winners of the 1997 FIFA Confederations Cup. The match was held at King Fahd II Stadium, Riyadh, Saudi Arabia, on 21 December 1997, and was contested by Brazil and Australia. Brazil won the match 6–0.

== Route to the final ==
Brazil
Round
Australia
Opponent
Result
Group stage
Opponent
Result
Saudi Arabia
3–0
Match 1
Mexico
3–1
Australia
0–0
Match 2
Brazil
0–0
Mexico
3–2
Match 3
Saudi Arabia
0–1

Team	Pld	W	D	L	GF	GA	GD	Pts
Brazil	3	2	1	0	6	2	4	7
Australia	3	1	1	1	3	2	1	4
Mexico	3	1	0	2	8	6	2	3
Saudi Arabia	3	1	0	2	1	8	–7	3

Final standing

Team	Pld	W	D	L	GF	GA	GD	Pts
Brazil	3	2	1	0	6	2	4	7
Australia	3	1	1	1	3	2	1	4
Mexico	3	1	0	2	8	6	2	3
Saudi Arabia	3	1	0	2	1	8	–7	3

Opponent
Result
Knockout stage
Opponent
Result
Czech Republic
2–0
Semi-Final
Uruguay
1–0

== Match details ==
21 December 1997
21:00 AST

Brazil	6–0	Australia
Ronaldo 15', 27', 59'; Romário 38', 53', 75' (pen.)	Report

King Fahd II Stadium, Riyadh
Attendance: 65,000
Referee: Pirom Un-Prasert (Thailand)

Brazil	Australia

GK	1	Dida
RB	2	Cafu
CB	3	Aldair
CB	4	Júnior Baiano
LB	6	Roberto Carlos
DM	5	Dunga (c)
DM	16	César Sampaio
AM	19	Juninho
AM	18	Denílson
CF	9	Ronaldo	(yellow card) 72'
CF	11	Romário
Substitutions:
GK	12	Rogério Ceni
FW	7	Bebeto
MF	8	Flávio Conceição
MF	10	Leonardo
DF	13	Zé Maria
DF	14	Gonçalves
DF	15	Zé Roberto
MF	17	Doriva
MF	20	Rivaldo
MF	21	Rodrigo Fabri
DF	22	Russo
Manager:
Mário Zagallo

GK	1	Mark Bosnich
SW	4	Milan Ivanović
RB	14	Tony Vidmar		(substituted off) 31'
CB	5	Alex Tobin (c)
CB	2	Steve Horvat		(substituted off) 55'
LB	3	Stan Lazaridis
CM	8	Craig Foster
CM	6	Ned Zelic
AM	10	Aurelio Vidmar		(substituted off) 31'
CF	9	Mark Viduka	(red card) 24'
CF	11	Harry Kewell
Substitutions:
GK	20	Zeljko Kalac
MF	7	Robbie Slater
DF	12	Matthew Bingley		(substituted on) 55'
DF	13	Robbie Hooker
MF	15	Josip Skoko
FW	16	Paul Trimboli
FW	17	Damian Mori
FW	18	John Aloisi		(substituted on) 31'
MF	19	Ernie Tapai
DF	21	Kevin Muscat		(substituted on) 31'
Manager:
(England) Terry Venables

OFFICIALS

- Assistant referees:
  - Mohamed Al Musawi (Oman)
  - Jacques Poudevigne (France)

MATCH RULES

- 90 minutes
- 30 minutes of extra-time if necessary
- Penalty shoot-out if scores still level:
- 3 substitutions allowed
