= 1997 FIFA Confederations Cup =

1997 السعودية
- 1997 FIFA Confederations Cup official logo

Tournament details
- Host country: Saudi Arabia
- Dates: 12–21 December
- Teams: 8 (from 6 confederations)
- Venue: 1 (in 1 host city)

Final positions
- Champions: Brazil (1st title)
- Runners-up: Australia
- Third place: Czech Republic
- Fourth place: Uruguay

Tournament statistics
- Matches played: 16
- Goals scored: 52 (3.25 per match)
- Attendance: 333,500 (20,844 per match)
- Top scorer: (Brazil) Romário (7 goals)
- Best player: (Brazil) Denílson
- Fair play award: South Africa

The 1997 FIFA Confederations Cup was the first Confederations Cup to be organized by FIFA. The tournament had previously been played in 1992 and 1995 as the King Fahd Cup. This edition of the tournament was hosted by Saudi Arabia (as with the previous editions) in December 1997, and was the first to feature representatives from all of the FIFA confederations.

It was won by Brazil, who, in a rematch of their goalless group stage encounter, beat Australia 6–0 in the final. After winning the 1997 tournament along with the 1994 FIFA World Cup and 1997 Copa América, Brazil became the first country to be the reigning champion of both major FIFA tournaments (the World Cup and the Confederations Cup), and champion of their respective confederation. This feat has since been accomplished once by France, victorious in the 1998 World Cup, UEFA Euro 2000, and the 2001 FIFA Confederations Cup. Brazil repeated this feat again in 2005.

== Qualified teams ==
Team	Confederation	Qualification method	Date qualification secured	Participation no.
Saudi Arabia	AFC	Hosts and 1996 AFC Asian Cup winner (Note: The United Arab Emirates was awarded a spot in the competition because the host, Saudi Arabia, had won the 1996 AFC Asian Cup.)	—N/a	3rd
Brazil	CONMEBOL	1994 FIFA World Cup winners	17 July 1994	1st
Uruguay	CONMEBOL	1995 Copa América winners	22 July 1995	1st
Mexico	CONCACAF	1996 CONCACAF Gold Cup winners	20 January 1996	2nd
South Africa	CAF	1996 African Cup of Nations winners	3 February 1996	1st
Czech Republic	UEFA	UEFA Euro 1996 runners-up (Note: Germany, the UEFA Euro 1996 winner, declined to participate. Czech Republic, the runners-up, were invited to their place.)	30 June 1996	1st
Australia	OFC	1996 OFC Nations Cup winners	1 November 1996	1st
United Arab Emirates	AFC	1996 AFC Asian Cup runners-up	21 December 1996	1st

== Venue ==
All matches were played in 67,000-seat King Fahd International Stadium in the city of Riyadh.

Location of the host city of the 1997 FIFA Confederations Cup.	Riyadh
Location of the host city of the 1997 FIFA Confederations Cup.	King Fahd International Stadium
Location of the host city of the 1997 FIFA Confederations Cup.	Capacity: 67,000

== Match referees ==
Africa

- (Niger) Lucien Bouchardeau
- (South Africa) Ian McLeod

Asia

- (Kuwait) Saad Mane
- (Thailand) Pirom Un-Prasert

Europe

- (Russia) Nikolai Levnikov

North America, Central America and Caribbean

- (Trinidad and Tobago) Ramesh Ramdhan

South America

- (Argentina) Javier Castrilli
- (Bolivia) René Ortubé

== Group stage ==
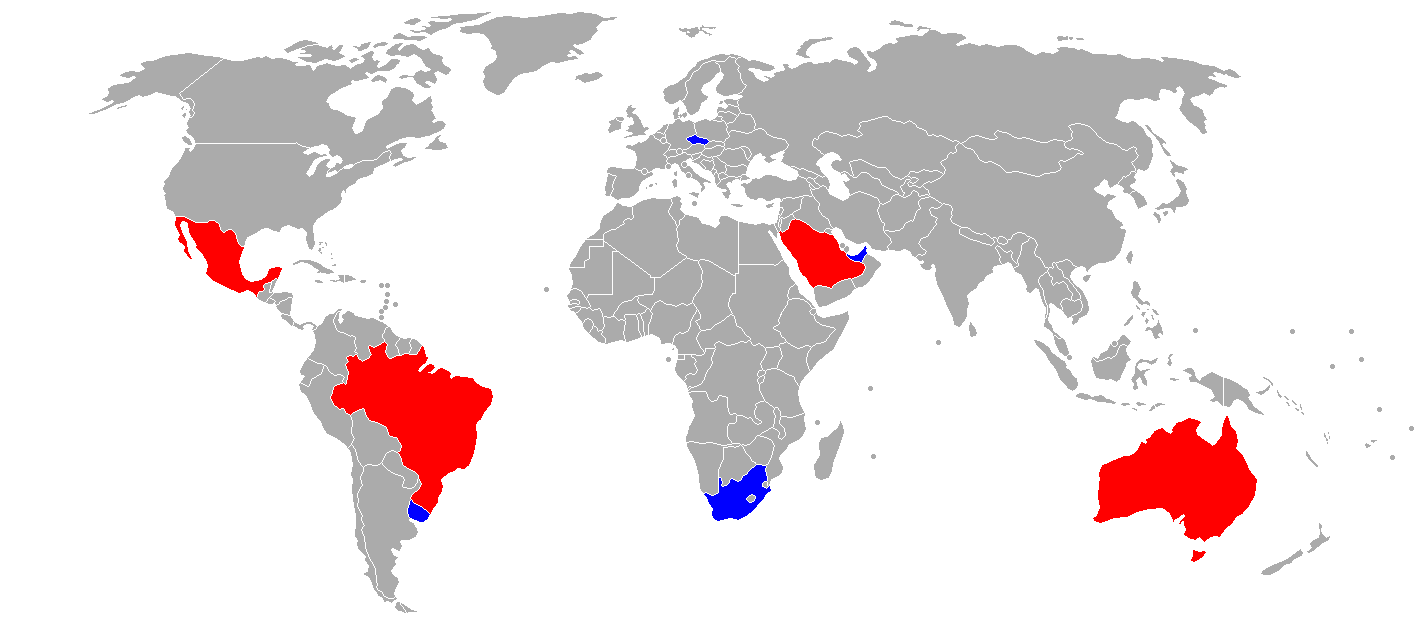
1997 FIFA Confederations Cup participating teams

=== Group A ===
Team	Pld	W	D	L	GF	GA	GD	Pts
Brazil	3	2	1	0	6	2	+4	7
Australia	3	1	1	1	3	2	+1	4
Mexico	3	1	0	2	8	6	+2	3
Saudi Arabia (H)	3	1	0	2	1	8	−7	3

(H) Hosts

12 December 1997
16:15 AST

Saudi Arabia	0–3	Brazil
	Report	César Sampaio 65'; Romário 73', 80'

King Fahd International Stadium, Riyadh
Attendance: 80,000
Referee: Nikolai Levnikov (Russia)

12 December 1997
19:00 AST

Mexico	1–3	Australia
Hernández 80' (pen.)	Report	Viduka 45'; Aloisi 59'; Mori 90'

King Fahd International Stadium, Riyadh
Attendance: 15,000
Referee: Pirom Un-Prasert (Thailand)

14 December 1997
17:50 AST

Saudi Arabia	0–5	Mexico
	Report	Palencia 20', 62'; Blanco 68', 76'; Luna 75'

King Fahd International Stadium, Riyadh
Attendance: 15,000
Referee: Ian McLeod (South Africa)

14 December 1997
20:00 AST

Australia	0–0	Brazil
	Report

King Fahd International Stadium, Riyadh
Attendance: 15,000
Referee: Lucien Bouchardeau (Niger)

16 December 1997
17:50 AST

Saudi Arabia	1–0	Australia
Al-Khilaiwi 40'	Report

King Fahd International Stadium, Riyadh
Attendance: 55,450
Referee: Javier Castrilli (Argentina)

16 December 1997
20:00 AST

Brazil	3–2	Mexico
Romário 41' (pen.); Denílson 61'; Júnior Baiano 66'	Report	Blanco 51'; Ramírez 90'

King Fahd International Stadium, Riyadh
Attendance: 20,000
Referee: Ian McLeod (South Africa)

=== Group B ===
Team	Pld	W	D	L	GF	GA	GD	Pts
Uruguay	3	3	0	0	8	4	+4	9
Czech Republic	3	1	1	1	9	5	+4	4
United Arab Emirates	3	1	0	2	2	8	−6	3
South Africa	3	0	1	2	5	7	−2	1

13 December 1997
17:50 AST

United Arab Emirates	0–2	Uruguay
	Report	Olivera 45+2'; Pacheco 90+2'

King Fahd International Stadium, Riyadh
Attendance: 13,000
Referee: Ramesh Ramdhan (Trinidad and Tobago)

13 December 1997
20:00 AST

South Africa	2–2	Czech Republic
Augustine 39'; Mkhalele 86'	Report	Šmicer 19', 40'

King Fahd International Stadium, Riyadh
Attendance: 7,500
Referee: Javier Castrilli (Argentina)

15 December 1997
17:50 AST

United Arab Emirates	1–0	South Africa
H. Mubarak 1'	Report

King Fahd International Stadium, Riyadh
Attendance: 11,000
Referee: René Ortubé (Bolivia)

15 December 1997
20:00 AST

Czech Republic	1–2	Uruguay
Siegl 89'	Report	Olivera 26'; Zalayeta 88'

King Fahd International Stadium, Riyadh
Attendance: 9,000
Referee: Saad Mane (Kuwait)

17 December 1997
17:50 AST

United Arab Emirates	1–6	Czech Republic
Al Talyani 78'	Report	Obaid 11' (o.g.); Nedvěd 22', 31'; Šmicer 42', 68', 71'

King Fahd International Stadium, Riyadh
Attendance: 8,000
Referee: René Ortubé (Bolivia)

17 December 1997
20:00 AST

Uruguay	4–3	South Africa
Silva 12', 66'; Recoba 42'; Callejas 90'	Report	Radebe 11'; Mkhalele 69'; Ndlanya 77'

King Fahd International Stadium, Riyadh
Attendance: 8,000
Referee: Ramesh Ramdhan (Trinidad and Tobago)

== Knockout stage ==
Semi-finals
19 December - Riyadh
Brazil	2
Czech Republic	0
19 December - Riyadh
Uruguay	0
Australia (a.e.t.)	1

Final
21 December - Riyadh
Brazil	6
Australia	0
Third place
21 December - Riyadh
Czech Republic	1
Uruguay	0

=== Semi-finals ===
19 December 1997
15:15 AST

Brazil	2–0	Czech Republic
Romário 54'; Ronaldo 83'	Report

King Fahd International Stadium, Riyadh
Attendance: 28,000
Referee: Lucien Bouchardeau (Niger)

19 December 1997
19:00 AST

Uruguay	0–1 (a.e.t./g.g.)	Australia
	Report	Kewell 92'

King Fahd International Stadium, Riyadh
Attendance: 22,000
Referee: Nikolai Levnikov (Russia)

=== Third place play-off ===
21 December 1997
17:50 AST

Czech Republic	1–0	Uruguay
Lasota 63'	Report

King Fahd International Stadium, Riyadh
Attendance: 27,000
Referee: Lucien Bouchardeau (Niger)

=== Final ===
21 December 1997
21:00 AST

Brazil	6–0	Australia
Ronaldo 15', 27', 59'; Romário 38', 53', 75' (pen.)	Report

King Fahd International Stadium, Riyadh
Attendance: 65,000
Referee: Pirom Un-Prasert (Thailand)

== Awards ==
Golden Ball	Golden Shoe	FIFA Fair Play Trophy
(Brazil) Denílson	(Brazil) Romário	South Africa
Silver Ball	Silver Shoe	South Africa
(Brazil) Romário	(Czech Republic) Vladimír Šmicer	South Africa
Bronze Ball	Bronze Shoe	South Africa
(Czech Republic) Vladimír Šmicer	(Brazil) Ronaldo	South Africa

Source: FIFA

== Statistics ==
=== Goalscorers ===
Romário received the Golden Shoe award for scoring seven goals. In total, 52 goals were scored by 32 different players, with only one of them credited as own goal.

7 goals

- (Brazil) Romário

5 goals

- (Czech Republic) Vladimír Šmicer

4 goals

- (Brazil) Ronaldo

3 goals

- (Mexico) Cuauhtémoc Blanco

2 goals

- (Czech Republic) Pavel Nedvěd
- (Mexico) Francisco Palencia
- (South Africa) Helman Mkhalele
- (Uruguay) Nicolás Olivera
- (Uruguay) Darío Silva

1 goal

- (Australia) Mark Viduka
- (Australia) John Aloisi
- (Australia) Damian Mori
- (Australia) Harry Kewell
- (Brazil) César Sampaio
- (Brazil) Denílson
- (Brazil) Júnior Baiano
- (Czech Republic) Horst Siegl
- (Czech Republic) Edvard Lasota
- (Saudi Arabia) Mohammed Al-Khilaiwi
- (Mexico) Luis Hernández
- (Mexico) Braulio Luna
- (Mexico) Ramón Ramírez
- (South Africa) Pollen Ndlanya
- (South Africa) Lucas Radebe
- (South Africa) Brendan Augustine
- (United Arab Emirates) Hassan Mubarak
- (United Arab Emirates) Adnan Al Talyani
- (Uruguay) Antonio Pacheco
- (Uruguay) Marcelo Zalayeta
- (Uruguay) Christian Callejas
- (Uruguay) Álvaro Recoba

Own goal

- (United Arab Emirates) Mohamed Obaid (against Czech Republic)

=== Tournament ranking ===
Per statistical convention in football, matches decided in extra time are counted as wins and losses, while matches decided by penalty shoot-outs are counted as draws.

Pos	Grp	Team	Pld	W	D	L	GF	GA	GD	Pts	Final result
1	A	Brazil	5	4	1	0	14	2	+12	13	Champions
2	A	Australia	5	2	1	2	4	8	−4	7	Runners-up
3	B	Czech Republic	5	2	1	2	10	7	+3	7	Third place
4	B	Uruguay	5	3	0	2	8	6	+2	9	Fourth place
5	A	Mexico	3	1	0	2	8	6	+2	3	Eliminated in group stage
6	B	United Arab Emirates	3	1	0	2	2	8	−6	3	Eliminated in group stage
7	A	Saudi Arabia (H)	3	1	0	2	1	8	−7	3	Eliminated in group stage
8	B	South Africa	3	0	1	2	5	7	−2	1	Eliminated in group stage

Source: FIFA
(H) Hosts

=== Team of the Tournament ===
Goalkeeper	Defenders	Midfielders	Forwards
(Saudi Arabia) Mohamed Al-Deayea	(Czech Republic) Michal Horňák (South Africa) Mark Fish (Brazil) Júnior Baiano (South Africa) David Nyathi	(Australia) Ned Zelic (Brazil) Dunga (Brazil) Roberto Carlos (Uruguay) Nicolás Olivera	(Czech Republic) Vladimír Šmicer (Brazil) Romário

== See also ==
- 1997 Tournoi de France
