= Dosso =

Dosso may refer to:

== Places in Niger ==
- Dosso Region
- Dosso (department)
- Dosso, Niger, a town, capital of the Dosso département
- Dosso Kingdom, the pre-colonial and modern ceremonial power in Dosso
- Dosso meteorite of 1962, which fell in Dosso, Niger (see meteorite falls)

== People ==
- Dosso Dossi (c. 1490–1542), Italian High Renaissance painter
- Diego Daldosso (born 1983), Italian footballer
- Zaynab Dosso (born 1999); Italian sprinter

== Court case in Pakistan ==
- Dosso case
