= Brazil at the FIFA Confederations Cup =

Football tournament results

Brazil at the FIFA Confederations Cup covers the participation of the Brazil national football team in the FIFA Confederations Cup, a tournament contested by the continental champions of each FIFA confederation alongside the host nation. Brazil have participated in eight of the ten editions of the tournament, winning four titles (1997, 2005, 2009, and 2013), finishing as runners-up once (1999), in fourth place once (2001), and exiting in the group stage once (2003). Brazil did not qualify for the 1992 and 1995 editions (then known as the King Fahd Cup) or the 2017 edition.

== Overall record ==
FIFA Confederations Cup record
Year	Round	Position	Pld	W	D	L	GF	GA	Squad
(Saudi Arabia) 1992	Did not qualify								
(Saudi Arabia) 1995	Did not qualify								
(Saudi Arabia) 1997	Champions	1st	5	4	1	0	14	2	Squad
(Mexico) 1999	Runners-up	2nd	5	4	0	1	18	6	Squad
(South Korea) (Japan) 2001	Fourth place	4th	5	1	2	2	3	3	Squad
(France) 2003	Group stage	5th	3	1	1	1	3	3	Squad
(Germany) 2005	Champions	1st	5	3	1	1	12	6	Squad
(South Africa) 2009	Champions	1st	5	5	0	0	14	5	Squad
(Brazil) 2013	Champions	1st	5	5	0	0	14	3	Squad
(Russia) 2017	Did not qualify								
Total	4 titles	7/10	33	23	5	5	78	28	—

== 1997 FIFA Confederations Cup ==
=== Group A ===
Team	Pld	W	D	L	GF	GA	GD	Pts
Brazil	3	2	1	0	6	2	+4	7
Australia	3	1	1	1	3	2	+1	4
Mexico	3	1	0	2	8	6	+2	3
Saudi Arabia (H)	3	1	0	2	1	8	−7	3

(H) Hosts

12 December 1997
16:15 AST

Saudi Arabia	0–3	Brazil
	Report	César Sampaio 65'; Romário 73', 80'

King Fahd International Stadium, Riyadh
Attendance: 80,000
Referee: Nikolai Levnikov (Russia)

14 December 1997
20:00 AST

Australia	0–0	Brazil
	Report

King Fahd II Stadium, Riyadh
Attendance: 15,000
Referee: Lucien Bouchardeau (Niger)

16 December 1997
20:00 AST

Brazil	3–2	Mexico
Romário 41' (pen.); Denílson 61'; Júnior Baiano 66'	Report	Blanco 51'; Ramírez 90'

King Fahd International Stadium, Riyadh
Attendance: 20,000
Referee: Ian McLeod (South Africa)

=== Knockout stage ===
==== Semi-finals ====
19 December 1997
15:15 AST

Brazil	2–0	Czech Republic
Romário 54'; Ronaldo 83'	Report

King Fahd International Stadium, Riyadh
Attendance: 28,000
Referee: Lucien Bouchardeau (Niger)

==== Final ====
21 December 1997
21:00 AST

Brazil	6–0	Australia
Ronaldo 15', 27', 59'; Romário 38', 53', 75' (pen.)	Report

King Fahd International Stadium, Riyadh
Attendance: 65,000
Referee: Pirom Un-Prasert (Thailand)

== 1999 FIFA Confederations Cup ==
=== Group B ===
Pos	Team	Pld	W	D	L	GF	GA	GD	Pts	Qualification
1	Brazil	3	3	0	0	7	0	+7	9	Advance to knockout stage
2	United States	3	2	0	1	4	2	+2	6	Advance to knockout stage
3	Germany	3	1	0	2	2	6	−4	3	
4	New Zealand	3	0	0	3	1	6	−5	0	

Source: FIFA
24 July 1999
12:00

Brazil	4–0	Germany
Zé Roberto 62'; Ronaldinho 72'; Alex 86', 87'	Report

Estadio Jalisco, Guadalajara
Attendance: 60,000
Referee: Gilberto Alcalá (Mexico)

28 July 1999
20:30

Brazil	1–0	United States
Ronaldinho 13'	Report

Estadio Jalisco, Guadalajara
Attendance: 54,000
Referee: Anders Frisk (Sweden)

30 July 1999
20:30

New Zealand	0–2	Brazil
	Report	Marcos Paulo 45+2'; Ronaldinho 88'

Estadio Jalisco, Guadalajara
Attendance: 53,000
Referee: Kim Young-joo (Korea Republic)

=== Knockout stage ===
==== Semi-finals ====
1 August 1999
15:00

Brazil	8–2	Saudi Arabia
João Carlos 8'; Ronaldinho 11', 65', 90+2'; Zé Roberto 33'; Alex 36', 86'; Rôni 62'	Report	Al-Otaibi 22', 31'

Estadio Jalisco, Guadalajara
Attendance: 48,000
Referee: Óscar Ruiz (Colombia)

==== Final ====
4 August 1999
21:00

Mexico	4–3	Brazil
Zepeda 13', 51'; Abundis 28'; Blanco 62'	Report	Serginho 43' (pen.); Rôni 47'; Zé Roberto 63'

Estadio Azteca, Mexico City
Attendance: 110,000
Referee: Anders Frisk (Sweden)

== 2001 FIFA Confederations Cup ==
=== Group B ===
Team	Pld	W	D	L	GF	GA	GD	Pts
Japan	3	2	1	0	5	0	+5	7
Brazil	3	1	2	0	2	0	+2	5
Cameroon	3	1	0	2	2	4	−2	3
Canada	3	0	1	2	0	5	−5	1

31 May 2001
17:00 JST

Brazil	2–0	Cameroon
Washington 53'; Carlos Miguel 57'	Report

Kashima Soccer Stadium, Ibaraki
Attendance: 10,519
Referee: Hellmut Krug (Germany)

2 June 2001
17:00 JST

Canada	0–0	Brazil
	Report

Kashima Soccer Stadium, Ibaraki
Attendance: 12,095
Referee: Lu Jun (China)

4 June 2001
19:30 JST

Brazil	0–0	Japan
	Report

Kashima Soccer Stadium, Ibaraki
Attendance: 37,740
Referee: Kim Milton Nielsen (Denmark)

=== Knockout stage ===
==== Semi-finals ====
7 June 2001
20:00 KST

France	2–1	Brazil
Pires 7'; Desailly 54'	Report	Ramon 30'

Suwon World Cup Stadium, Suwon
Attendance: 34,527
Referee: Gamal Al-Ghandour (Egypt)

==== Third place play-off ====
9 June 2001
19:00 KST

Australia	1–0	Brazil
Murphy 84'	Report

Ulsan Munsu Football Stadium, Ulsan
Attendance: 28,520
Referee: Hellmut Krug (Germany)

== 2003 FIFA Confederations Cup ==
=== Group B ===
Team	Pld	W	D	L	GF	GA	GD	Pts
Cameroon	3	2	1	0	2	0	+2	7
Turkey	3	1	1	1	4	4	0	4
Brazil	3	1	1	1	3	3	0	4
United States	3	0	1	2	1	3	−2	1

19 June 2003
21:00 CEST

Brazil	0–1	Cameroon
	Report	Eto'o 83'

Stade de France, Saint-Denis
Attendance: 46,719
Referee: Valentin Ivanov (Russia)

21 June 2003
21:00 CEST

Brazil	1–0	United States
Adriano 22'	Report

Stade de Gerland, Lyon
Attendance: 20,306
Referee: Lucílio Batista (Portugal)

23 June 2003
21:00 CEST

Brazil	2–2	Turkey
Adriano 23'; Alex 90+3'	Report	Gökdeniz 53'; Okan 81'

Stade Geoffroy-Guichard, Saint-Étienne
Attendance: 29,170
Referee: Markus Merk (Germany)

== 2005 FIFA Confederations Cup ==
=== Group B ===
Pos	Team	Pld	W	D	L	GF	GA	GD	Pts	Qualification
1	Mexico	3	2	1	0	3	1	+2	7	Advance to knockout stage
2	Brazil	3	1	1	1	5	3	+2	4	Advance to knockout stage
3	Japan	3	1	1	1	4	4	0	4	
4	Greece	3	0	1	2	0	4	−4	1	

16 June 2005
20:45

Brazil	3–0	Greece
Adriano 41'; Robinho 46'; Juninho 81'	Report

Zentralstadion, Leipzig
Attendance: 42,507
Referee: Ľuboš Micheľ (Slovakia)

19 June 2005
20:45

Mexico	1–0	Brazil
Borgetti 59'	Report

Stadium Hanover, Hanover
Attendance: 43,677
Referee: Roberto Rosetti (Italy)

22 June 2005
20:45

Japan	2–2	Brazil
Nakamura 27'; Oguro 88'	Report	Robinho 10'; Ronaldinho 32'

RheinEnergieStadion, Cologne
Attendance: 44,922
Referee: Mourad Daami (Tunisia)

=== Knockout stage ===
==== Semi-finals ====
25 June 2005
18:00 CEST

Germany	2–3	Brazil
Podolski 23'; Ballack 45+3' (pen.)	Report	Adriano 21', 76'; Ronaldinho 43' (pen.)

Frankenstadion, Nuremberg
Attendance: 42,187
Referee: Carlos Chandía (Chile)

==== Final ====
29 June 2005
20:45 CEST

Brazil	4–1	Argentina
Adriano 11', 63'; Kaká 16'; Ronaldinho 47'	Report	Aimar 65'

Waldstadion, Frankfurt
Attendance: 45,591
Referee: Ľuboš Micheľ (Slovakia)

== 2009 FIFA Confederations Cup ==
=== Group B ===
Pos	Team	Pld	W	D	L	GF	GA	GD	Pts	
1	Brazil	3	3	0	0	10	3	+7	9	Advance to knockout stage
2	United States	3	1	0	2	4	6	−2	3	Advance to knockout stage
3	Italy	3	1	0	2	3	5	−2	3	
4	Egypt	3	1	0	2	4	7	−3	3	

Source: FIFA
15 June 2009
16:00 SAST

Brazil	4–3	Egypt
Kaká 5', 90+1' (pen.); Luís Fabiano 11'; Juan 37'	Report	Zidan 9', 56'; Shawky 54'

Free State Stadium, Bloemfontein
Attendance: 27,851
Referee: Howard Webb (England)

18 June 2009
16:00 SAST

United States	0–3	Brazil
	Report	Felipe Melo 7'; Robinho 20'; Maicon 62'

Loftus Versfeld Stadium, Pretoria
Attendance: 39,617
Referee: Massimo Busacca (Switzerland)

21 June 2009
20:30 SAST

Italy	0–3	Brazil
	Report	Luís Fabiano 37', 43'; Dossena 45' (o.g.)

Loftus Versfeld Stadium, Pretoria
Attendance: 41,195
Referee: Benito Archundia (Mexico)

=== Knockout stage ===
==== Semi-finals ====
25 June 2009
20:30 SAST

Brazil	1–0	South Africa
Dani Alves 88'	Report

Ellis Park Stadium, Johannesburg
Attendance: 48,049
Referee: Massimo Busacca (Switzerland)

==== Final ====
28 June 2009
20:30 SAST

United States	2–3	Brazil
Dempsey 10'; Donovan 27'	Report	Luís Fabiano 46', 74'; Lúcio 84'

Ellis Park Stadium, Johannesburg
Attendance: 52,291
Referee: Martin Hansson (Sweden)

== 2013 FIFA Confederations Cup ==
=== Group A ===
Pos	Team	Pld	W	D	L	GF	GA	GD	Pts	Qualification
1	Brazil (H)	3	3	0	0	9	2	+7	9	Advance to knockout stage
2	Italy	3	2	0	1	8	8	0	6	Advance to knockout stage
3	Mexico	3	1	0	2	3	5	−2	3	
4	Japan	3	0	0	3	4	9	−5	0	

Source: FIFA
(H) Hosts
15 June 2013
16:00

Brazil	3–0	Japan
Neymar 3'; Paulinho 48'; Jô 90+3'	Report

Estádio Nacional Mané Garrincha, Brasília
Attendance: 67,423
Referee: Pedro Proença (Portugal)

19 June 2013
16:00

Brazil	2–0	Mexico
Neymar 9'; Jô 90+3'	Report

Estádio Castelão, Fortaleza
Attendance: 57,804
Referee: Howard Webb (England)

22 June 2013
16:00

Italy	2–4	Brazil
Giaccherini 51'; Chiellini 71'	Report	Dante 45+1'; Neymar 55'; Fred 66', 89'

Itaipava Arena Fonte Nova, Salvador
Attendance: 48,874
Referee: Ravshan Irmatov (Uzbekistan)

=== Knockout stage ===
==== Semi-finals ====
26 June 2013
16:00

Brazil	2–1	Uruguay
Fred 41'; Paulinho 86'	Report	Cavani 48'

Estádio Mineirão, Belo Horizonte
Attendance: 57,483
Referee: Enrique Osses (Chile)

==== Final ====
30 June 2013
19:00

Brazil	3–0	Spain
Fred 2', 48'; Neymar 44'	Report

Estádio do Maracanã, Rio de Janeiro
Attendance: 73,531
Referee: Björn Kuipers (Netherlands)

== Goalscorers ==
Rank	Player	Goals	Confederations Cups
1	Ronaldinho	9	1999 (6) and 2005 (3)
2	Adriano	7	2003 (2) and 2005 (5)
2	Romário	7	1997
4	Alex	5	1999 (4) and 2003 (1)
4	Luís Fabiano	5	2009
4	Fred	5	2013

== See also ==
- Brazil at the CONCACAF Gold Cup
- Brazil at the Copa América
- Brazil at the FIFA World Cup
