= Massimo Ganci =

Italian footballer (born 1981)

Personal information
- Date of birth: 17 November 1981 (age 44)
- Place of birth: Milan, Italy
- Height: 1.77 m (5 ft 10 in)
- Position: Forward

Youth career
- US Corsico 1908
- Monza

Senior career*
Years	Team	Apps	(Gls)
1999–2002	Monza	58	(16)
2002–2005	Treviso	58	(21)
2004–2005	→ Reggina (loan)	10	(0)
2005–2006	Piacenza	39	(4)
2006–2008	Bari	66	(9)
2008–2009	Cittadella	14	(1)
2009	Salernitana	18	(6)
2009–2011	Pescara	51	(10)
2011–2013	Frosinone	40	(7)
2015	Maceratese	4	(1)
2015–2016	Castelfidardo	16	(8)
2016	L'Aquila	11	(2)
2016–2017	Pineto	15	(2)
2017–2018	Pavia	32	(16)
2018	Hamrun Spartans	4	(2)
2018–2019	Crema	16	(6)
2019	Barletta		
2019–2020	Unipomezia Virtus		
2020–2021	Foligno		
2021–2022	USD Osimana		
Total		452	(111)

International career
2001	Italy U20	4	(1)
- * Club domestic league appearances and goals

Massimo Ganci (born 17 November 1981) is an Italian former professional footballer who plays as a forward.

== Career ==
Ganci started his professional career at Monza. In June 2001, along with Diego Daldosso, Daniele Degano and Cristian Maggioni, they were signed by Parma in co-ownership deal for 1 billion each (€516,457). In June 2002 Daldosso and Ganci was bought back by Monza while Degano and Maggioni joined Parma outright. Ganci also immediately left for Treviso in temporary deal in summer 2002.

Ganci was signed outright by Treviso in January 2004, after a 1 1/2-season loan from Monza. In summer 2004 he left for Reggina Calcio, where he made his Serie A debut. As he made his Serie A debut, FIGC accepted the claim from his youth club Corsico against Reggina for training compensation of €103,000 an incentive scheme set-up by FIGC. In January 2005 he was signed by Piacenza in new co-ownership deal, re-joining Degano. In January 2006 Ganci left for Bari in temporary deal.

Bari acquired Piacenza's half registration rights on Ganci in summer 2006 via Treviso, which Bari paid Treviso €250,000; In June 2007 Bari acquired Ganci outright from Treviso. Ganci was included in Bari's 2008 pre-season camp on 14 July despite he would join the team on 16 July. On 1 September 2008 Ganci joined Cittadella. In January 2009 he was signed by Salernitana.

In July 2009 he left for Pescara. In 2011–12 Serie B season, he was awarded no.99 shirt of the team,

Ganci was released by Pescara along with Samuele Olivi on 29 August; on the same day he was signed by Frosinone in 2-year contract.

=== Italian football scandal ===
On 16 July 2013 Ganci was suspended from football for 4 years due to involvement in 2011 Italian football scandal. His appeal was rejected on 27 July. On 27 April 2014 his final appeal was accepted, which the ban was reduced to 22 months.

=== Maceratese ===
On 21 July 2015 Ganci was signed by Maceratese.

=== Unipomezia Virtus ===
In December 2019, Ganci joined Unipomezia Virtus.
