= 2002 FIFA World Cup final =

World Cup final, held in Japan

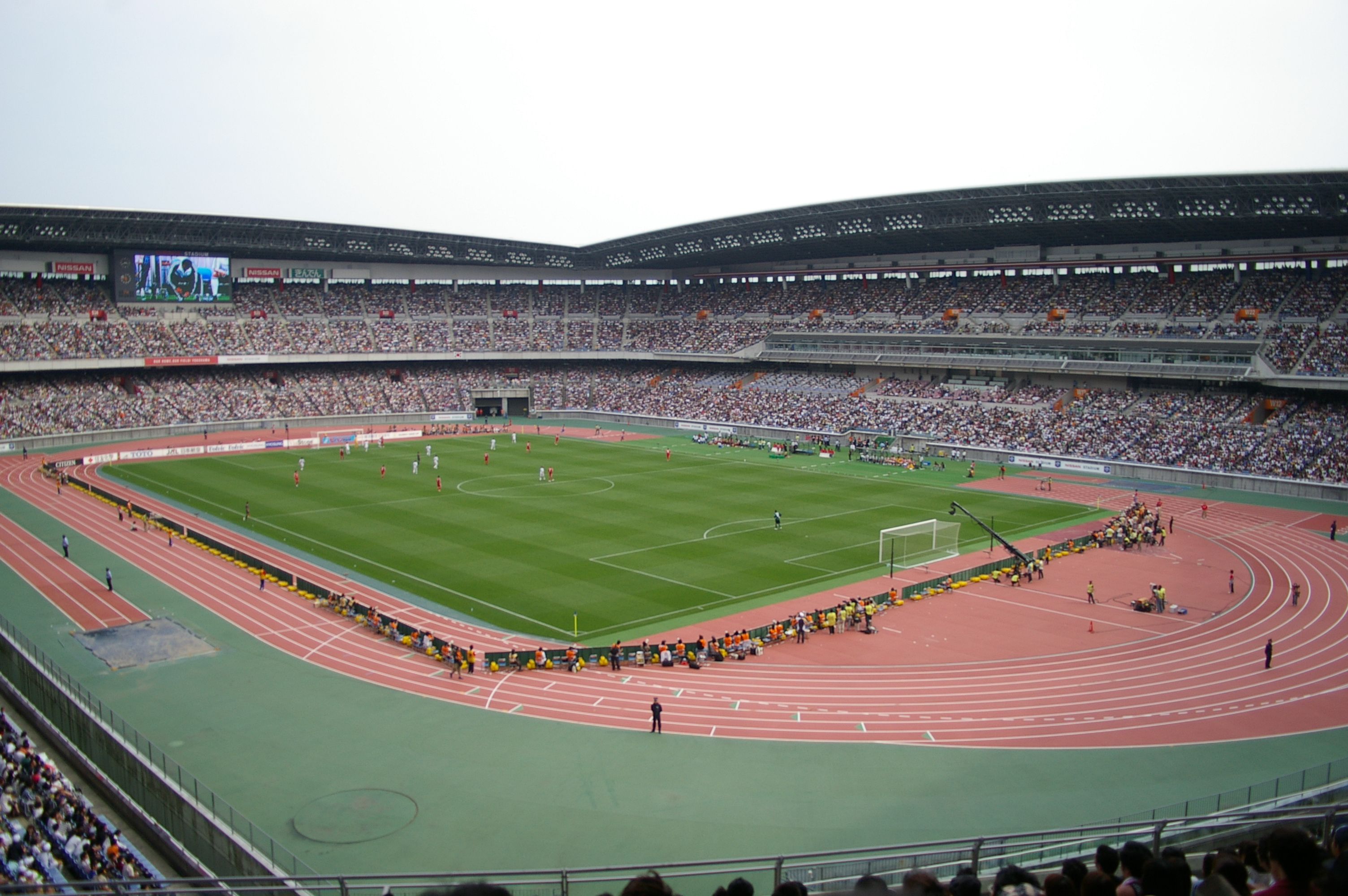
- The final was played at International Stadium Yokohama (pictured in 2008).
- Event: 2002 FIFA World Cup
| Germany | Brazil |
| 0 | 2 |
- Date: 30 June 2002
- Venue: International Stadium, Yokohama, Japan
- Man of the Match: Ronaldo (Brazil)
- Referee: Pierluigi Collina (Italy)
- Attendance: 69,029
- Weather: Cloudy; 21 °C (70 °F), 88% humidity

The final match of the 2002 World Cup, the 17th edition of FIFA's competition for national football teams, was played at the International Stadium in Yokohama, Japan, on 30 June 2002, and was contested by Germany and Brazil.

The tournament comprised hosts South Korea and Japan, holders France, and 29 other teams who emerged from the qualification phase, organised by the six FIFA confederations. The 32 teams competed in a group stage, from which 16 teams qualified for the knockout stage. En route to the final, Germany finished first in Group E, with two wins and a draw, after which they defeated Paraguay in the round of 16, the United States in the quarter-finals and South Korea in the semi-finals. Brazil finished top of Group C with three wins, before defeating Belgium in the round of 16, England in the quarter-final, and Turkey in the semi-final. The final took place in front of 69,029 supporters, with an estimated 1.1 billion watching on television, and was refereed by Pierluigi Collina from Italy.

After a goalless first half, Brazil took the lead through Ronaldo on 67 minutes, scoring after what German goalkeeper Oliver Kahn called his "only mistake in the finals". They extended their lead twelve minutes later when Kléberson ran towards the German penalty area before passing towards Rivaldo. He let the ball pass through his legs and it reached Ronaldo, who used his first touch to take the ball away from German player Gerald Asamoah, and then shot the ball into the bottom corner of Kahn's net. The final score was 2–0 to Brazil.

Brazil's win was their fifth World Cup title, which remains a record as of 2026. Ronaldo was named the man of the match, while Kahn was awarded the Golden Ball as FIFA's outstanding player of the tournament. Brazil's manager, Luiz Felipe Scolari, expressed "the joy of knowing we did our job", while noting that it was "full of very hard work". His German counterpart Rudi Völler said, "When you lose a game, the disappointment is great, of course. But it is no shame to lose against a team like Brazil." At the next World Cup in Germany in 2006, Brazil were eliminated in the quarter-final by France while Germany reached the semi-final stage on home soil and eventually finished third.

As of 2026, Brazil remains the most recent champion to win every match in the tournament.

== Background ==
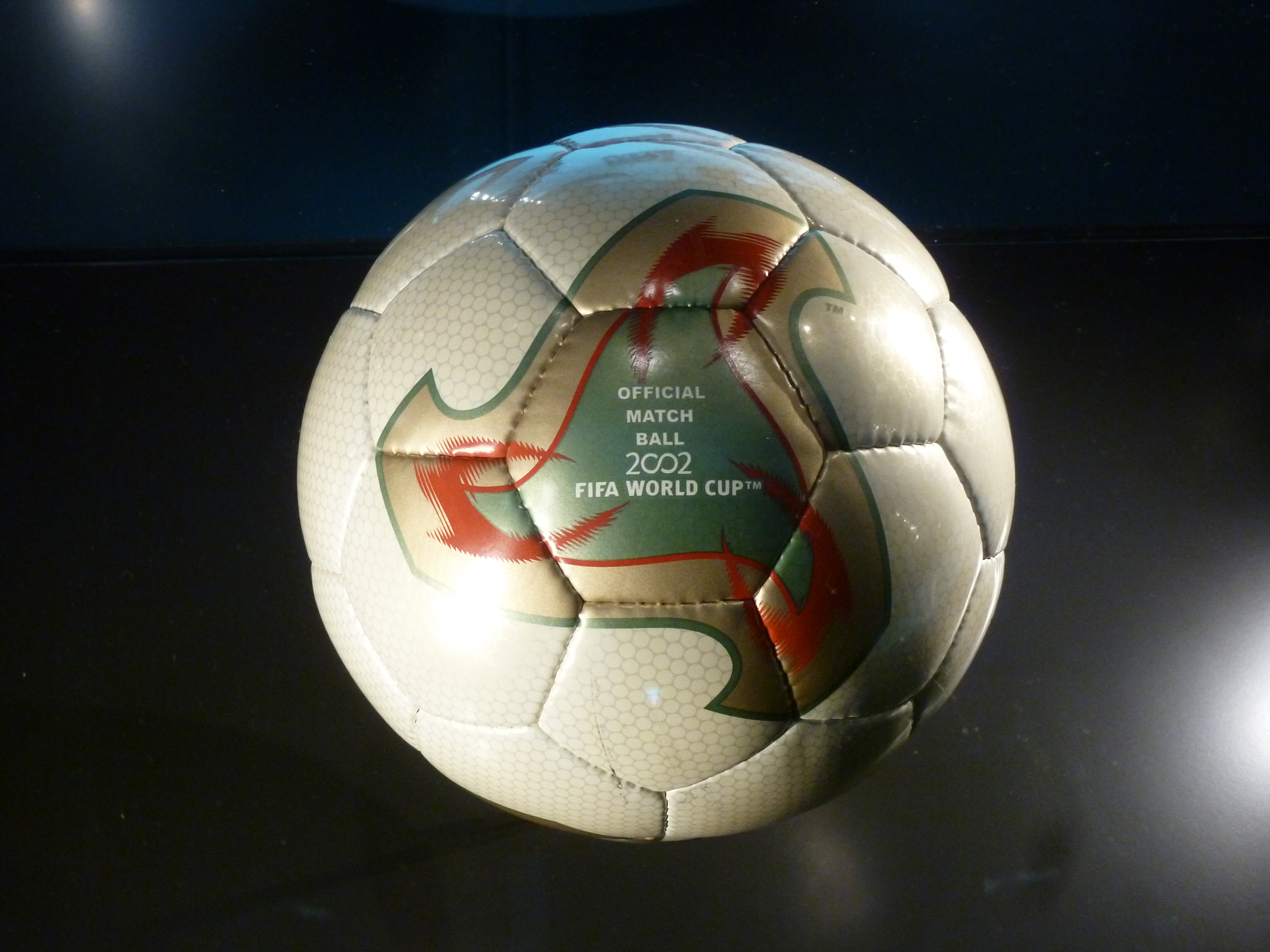
An example of the Adidas Fevernova ball used in the match

The 2002 FIFA World Cup was the 17th edition of the World Cup, FIFA's football competition for national teams, held in Japan and South Korea between 31 May and 30 June 2002. The national teams of Japan and South Korea qualified for the finals automatically as tournament hosts, as did the previous hosts France, the winners of the previous World Cup in 1998. The remaining 29 spots were decided through qualifying rounds held between March 2000 and November 2001, organised by the six FIFA confederations and involving 193 teams. In the finals, the teams were divided into eight groups of four with each team playing each other once in a round-robin format. The two top teams from each group advanced to a knock-out stage. Holders France were eliminated in the group stage in 2002, losing games against Senegal and Denmark as they finished bottom of Group A.

The game was played at the International Stadium in Yokohama, where three other matches in the World Cup were previously held. The stadium was the largest in the tournament as well as the largest in Japan, seating over 70,000 spectators. The aggregate attendance across all World Cup matches at the stadium was 260,000.

The match ball for this game was the Adidas Fevernova, which was specifically made for the World Cup. Its design was different from the normal "Tango" type of three-pointed shapes connecting each hexagon, instead introducing a different, triangle-like shape on four hexagons. This look and colour usage was based on Asian culture. It was manufactured using a syntactic foam layer and Adidas said should give the ball a "more precise and predictable flight path". Adidas said the ball was smaller and heavier than the average permitted circumference and weight, but several players criticised it for being too large and too light. Italian goalkeeper Gianluigi Buffon called the ball "a ridiculous kiddy's bouncing ball," while Brazil's Edílson criticised the ball as being "too big and too light".

In the previous World Cup in 1998, Germany were eliminated by surprise debutants Croatia in the quarter-finals. The team suffered several injuries prior to the 2002 World Cup finals including a knee issue for Sebastian Deisler, who was ruled out two days before the team departed for the tournament with an injury sustained in a friendly match against Austria. Midfielder Mehmet Scholl and defenders Christian Wörns and Jens Nowotny also missed the tournament due to injury. Brazil had reached the final of the 1998 tournament, where they lost 3–0 to France. Between that defeat and 2002, Brazil went through a series of managers. The first was Vanderlei Luxemburgo, whose contract was terminated after the team lost another FIFA final at the Confederations Cup against another host of the tournament at the time Mexico in the final and were eliminated at the quarter-finals of the 2000 Olympic football tournament. He was followed by Émerson Leão, who was dismissed in 2001 after winning four of eleven games in charge and with Brazil at risk of not qualifying for the World Cup for the first time. The incumbent going into the tournament was Luiz Felipe Scolari, who favoured a different style of football from his predecessors which he called "bullyboy soccer". In describing the style, Soccer America's Scott French said "the object is to disrupt and destroy, foul and waste time". The two teams had met previously in several friendlies as well as the 1980 World Champions' Gold Cup, the 1993 U.S. Cup and the 1999 FIFA Confederations Cup – their most recent meeting, which resulted in a 4–0 Brazil win – but the 2002 final was their first meeting at a World Cup.

This final was also the third straight for Brazil, having won the match in 1994, only the second team to do so—after the Germans did that in 1982 (lost), 1986 (lost), and 1990 (won). Brazil were aiming to become the first team to win five world titles, having won the tournament in 1958, 1962, 1970, and 1994. Germany were hoping to become only the second team to win four World Cup titles, having won it as West Germany in 1954, 1974, and 1990.

== Route to the final ==
=== Germany ===
Germany's route to the final
| | Opponent | Result |
|---|---|---|
| 1 | Saudi Arabia | 8–0 |
| 2 | Republic of Ireland | 1–1 |
| 3 | Cameroon | 2–0 |
| R16 | Paraguay | 1–0 |
| QF | United States | 1–0 |
| SF | South Korea | 1–0 |

Germany were drawn in Group E at the World Cup, along with Cameroon, the Republic of Ireland and Saudi Arabia. In their opening match against Saudi Arabia at the Sapporo Dome in the Japanese city of Sapporo they won 8–0, their biggest win in a World Cup. Miroslav Klose scored a hat-trick and was one of six players on the German team to score. In their next game against the Republic of Ireland, Klose gave Germany a 1–0 lead which they held throughout much of the game. However, Ireland equalised through Robbie Keane in second-half stoppage time. This would prove to be the only goal conceded by Germany prior to the final. Needing a win to finish first in their group, Germany entered their final match against Cameroon at Shizuoka Stadium in Fukuroi, Japan, one point ahead of the Republic of Ireland in the group. Germany went on to beat Cameroon 2–0, with goals from Marco Bode and Klose – his fifth goal of the tournament – although Germany did suffer a setback when Carsten Ramelow was sent off. Germany finished top of Group E with seven points (two wins and a draw), and advanced to the knockout round.

In the round of 16, Germany faced Paraguay, the Group B runners-up, at Jeju World Cup Stadium in the South Korean city of Seogwipo. The first half ended goalless and it remained so until the 88th minute when Oliver Neuville scored, securing a 1–0 win for Germany. In their quarter-final match, Germany faced the United States who had more shots on goal, but Germany won the game 1–0 with Michael Ballack scoring in the 38th minute. In the semi-final, Germany faced co-hosts South Korea at the Seoul World Cup Stadium. Like the game against Paraguay, there were no goals until late in the game, until Ballack scored the winner, hitting the rebound into the goal after goalkeeper Lee Woon-jae had saved his winner shot. Four minutes before scoring, he had been shown a yellow card for a foul on Lee Chun-soo and was suspended for the final for receiving his second booking.

=== Brazil ===
Brazil's route to the final
| | Opponent | Result |
|---|---|---|
| 1 | Turkey | 2–1 |
| 2 | China | 4–0 |
| 3 | Costa Rica | 5–2 |
| R16 | Belgium | 2–0 |
| QF | England | 2–1 |
| SF | Turkey | 1–0 |

Brazil were drawn into Group C, along with China, Costa Rica and Turkey. Their first game was on 3 June against Turkey. In stoppage time at the end of the first half, Turkey's Hasan Şaş scored. In the second half, Brazil's Ronaldo levelled the match at 1–1 in the 50th minute. Four minutes before the end of regular time, the referee awarded Brazil a penalty after Turkish defender Alpay Özalan fouled Brazilian striker Luizão, with Alpay also receiving a red card. Rivaldo scored from the penalty spot and the match finished 2–1 to Brazil. During the game, Turkish defender Hakan Ünsal kicked a ball towards Rivaldo which struck his thigh, but Rivaldo fell to the ground clutching his face. The referee sent the Turkish player off with a second yellow card. In their second game against China at the Ulsan Munsu Football Stadium in Ulsan, South Korea, Brazil won 4–0 with Roberto Carlos, Rivaldo, Ronaldinho and Ronaldo all scoring. In their final game against Costa Rica, Brazil completed a 5–2 win. Ronaldo scored two goals, with Edmílson, Rivaldo and Júnior scoring the others. Brazil finished in first place in their group with nine points and eleven goals.

In the round of 16, Brazil faced Group H runners-up Belgium at the Kobe Wing Stadium in Kobe, Japan. The game remained goalless until he 67th minute, when Rivaldo scored for Brazil. Ronaldo added a second goal in the 87th minute, to complete a 2–0 win for Brazil. Brazil faced England in the quarter-finals, with their opponents taking the lead through a goal by Michael Owen in the 23rd minute. The scores were levelled in first half stoppage time, when Rivaldo scored. Following half-time, Ronaldinho scored for Brazil, putting them in the lead. Ronaldinho was sent off by referee Felipe Ramos Rizo seven minutes later, which meant he was suspended for the semi-final. Although they played with ten men, the Brazilians were able to prevent an equaliser from England and advanced into the semi-finals. There, Brazil faced Turkey for the second time, at the Saitama Stadium 2002 in Saitama, Japan. The game was goalless until the 49th minute, when Ronaldo scored what proved to be the only goal of the match, running in the penalty area and hitting it with his toe past goalkeeper Rüştü Reçber, as Brazil won 1–0.

== Match ==
=== Pre-match ===
With the exception of the suspended Ballack, who was replaced by Jens Jeremies, the remainder of the team that started the semi-final against South Korea were available and selected for the final. For Brazil, Ronaldinho returned to the team following his suspension in the semi-final. He replaced Edílson, whom BBC Sport described as having been a "poor replacement" for Ronaldinho and "almost anonymous throughout". Brazil's team was otherwise unchanged from the team which beat Turkey.

Brazil were considered the bookmakers' favourites to win with odds of 2–5 compared with 7–4 for Germany. Previewing the match, BBC Sport said that "both teams [had] had problematic passages to the final" but noted the two teams' experience at this level, highlighting Brazil's record number of titles as well as Germany's status as the most successful European team. The report focused on Ronaldo, who it said was "nearing redemption" having been "a shadow of his usual self after he played just a few hours after suffering a fit" in the 1998 final. It also noted that the Germans could take solace in the performances of goalkeeper Oliver Kahn, who had conceded only one goal up to that point in the tournament.

Except for 1978, Brazil and Germany have participated in every final of the tournament since 1950 until the upcoming final. Despite having the most games played in the competition, they had never faced each other until now. Germany could win their first title after its reunification, and Brazil, who won their last six matches, could become the first team to win all seven matches in the tournament without requiring extra time or penalties.

Pierluigi Collina of Italy was selected to referee the final. He was described prior to the match by Stephen Wade of the Associated Press as being "regarded as game's finest referee", and as of 2021 he is regarded by many observers as the greatest of all time. Describing his preparation for the game, Collina said that he was "very interested in the tactics" of the two teams, so that he would be "ready to read the game". He described his selection as "unbelievable", saying that "I try to keep my feet on the ground but it is very difficult". The assistant referees for the game were Sweden's Leif Lindberg and England's Philip Sharp, while Hugh Dallas from Scotland was the fourth official.

=== First half ===
Brazil kicked off the game at 8pm local time (11am UTC), in front of an attendance of 69,029 with an estimated global television audience of 1.1 billion. The weather at Haneda Airport, 17 kilometres (11 mi) from the stadium, (Note: Distance measured using Google Maps distance calculator, between Haneda Airport, coordinates 35.5469648°N, 139.7719668°E and Nissan Stadium, coordinates 35.5099504°N, 139.604205°E.) was recorded as cloudy at the time of kick-off, with a temperature of 21 °C (70 °F) and 88% humidity. Germany were described by The Guardian's Scott Murray as "well on top" in the first fifteen minutes, and they had an opportunity to score when Bernd Schneider ran with the ball past Gilberto Silva before crossing into the penalty area towards Klose, where it was cleared behind by Edmílson. However, it was Brazil who had what Murray described as the "first real chance of the game" on 18 minutes. Ronaldinho passed upfield to Ronaldo, who was one-on-one with Kahn. Ronaldo hit a shot with his left foot, but it went wide of the goal. Schneider passed to Bode in the Brazilian penalty area on 29 minutes, but Bode was unable to control the ball. On 30 minutes Ronaldinho made another pass through to Ronaldo, who found himself with only Kahn to beat for a second time. He was unable to put enough power on the shot under pressure from Thomas Linke, and Kahn saved.

Shortly before half-time, Torsten Frings sent a cross into the Brazilian penalty area from the right towards Klose, but it evaded all players and was retrieved by Neuville on the opposite side of the pitch. He passed the ball to Jeremies outside the penalty area, who attempted a curling shot from 25 yards (23 m), but it went high and wide of the goal. Kléberson then had two chances to score, putting the first wide in the 42nd minute, and hitting the bar from long range two minutes later. Lúcio had an opportunity when he received the ball in the penalty area and turned with it at his feet, but his shot was blocked. Ronaldo then missed his third scoring chance, in stoppage time, when a Roberto Carlos pass reached him after evading all the German defenders. Kahn saved Ronaldo's shot with his outstretched foot.

=== Second half ===
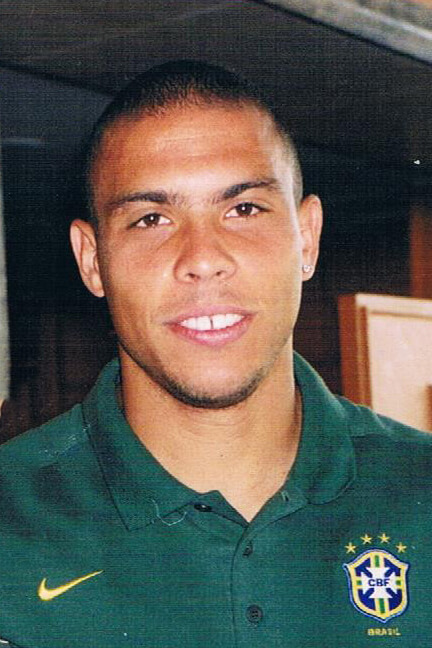
Brazilian striker Ronaldo scored two goals in the second half

One minute into the second half, Jeremies had a chance to give Germany the lead when Neuville found him in an unmarked position from a corner kick, but his header was blocked by the foot of Edmílson. They had another opportunity in the 50th minute, when Neuville struck a free kick from long range towards the corner of the goal, but Brazilian goalkeeper Marcos tipped the shot onto the post. Three minutes later, Roberto Carlos crossed into the penalty area where Gilberto Silva met the ball with a header, but Kahn was able to make the save. Ronaldo then hit a shot at the German goal which was blocked by Ramelow, before Klose passed to Frings at the other end and he hit his attempt over the crossbar. A shot two minutes later from Dietmar Hamann also went over the goal. Then, in the 62nd minute, Schneider sent a ball into the Brazilian penalty area which Neuville was unable to reach.

Brazil took the lead in the 67th minute with a sequence that started with Ronaldo winning the ball from Hamann in the German half of the pitch. He passed to Rivaldo, who struck a low shot towards goal. Kahn attempted to catch the shot, but he was unable to take it cleanly and it rebounded into play. Ronaldo, who had followed Rivaldo's shot, took advantage of Kahn being off balance, scoring the rebound into the bottom corner before Kahn could recover, breaking his clean sheet streak at 427 minutes. The Brazilians scored their second goal twelve minutes later, after a run from Kléberson from just beyond the halfway line led to Brazil having four attackers against Germany's three defenders. Kléberson passed towards Rivaldo, who was in the centre of the pitch just outside the German penalty area. Rivaldo let the ball go through his legs, and the pace on Kléberson's pass found Ronaldo. German player Gerald Asamoah attempted to block the shot, but Ronaldo used his first touch to take the ball away from him, and struck the ball into the bottom corner of Kahn's net with his second. Germany had another chance in the 83rd minute when Oliver Bierhoff, who had come on as a substitute, hit a first-time shot towards goal from the penalty spot, but Marcos was able to save the shot. Christian Ziege had a final shot for Germany in the third minute of stoppage time, but it was saved by Marcos and the game finished 2–0 to Brazil.

=== Details ===
30 June 2002
20:00

| Germany | 0–2 | Brazil |
|---|---|---|
| | | Ronaldo 67', 79' |

International Stadium, Yokohama
Attendance: 69,029
Referee: Pierluigi Collina (Italy)

| Germany | Brazil |

| GK | 1 | Oliver Kahn (c) |
| CB | 2 | Thomas Linke |
| CB | 5 | Carsten Ramelow |
| CB | 21 | Christoph Metzelder |
| RM | 22 | Torsten Frings |
| CM | 8 | Dietmar Hamann |
| CM | 16 | Jens Jeremies | | (substituted off) 77' |
| LM | 17 | Marco Bode | | (substituted off) 84' |
| AM | 19 | Bernd Schneider |
| CF | 11 | Miroslav Klose | (yellow card) 9' | (substituted off) 74' |
| CF | 7 | Oliver Neuville |
Substitutions:
| FW | 20 | Oliver Bierhoff | | (substituted on) 74' |
| FW | 14 | Gerald Asamoah | | (substituted on) 77' |
| MF | 6 | Christian Ziege | | (substituted on) 84' |
Manager:
Rudi Völler

| GK | 1 | Marcos |
| CB | 3 | Lúcio |
| CB | 5 | Edmílson |
| CB | 4 | Roque Júnior | (yellow card) 6' |
| RWB | 2 | Cafu (c) |
| LWB | 6 | Roberto Carlos |
| CM | 8 | Gilberto Silva |
| CM | 15 | Kléberson |
| AM | 11 | Ronaldinho | | (substituted off) 85' |
| CF | 10 | Rivaldo |
| CF | 9 | Ronaldo | | (substituted off) 90' |
Substitutions:
| MF | 19 | Juninho Paulista | | (substituted on) 85' |
| MF | 17 | Denílson | | (substituted on) 90' |
Manager:
Luiz Felipe Scolari

Man of the Match:
Ronaldo (Brazil)

Assistant referees:
Leif Lindberg (Sweden)
Philip Sharp (England)
Fourth official:
Hugh Dallas (Scotland)

Match rules

- 90 minutes
- 30 minutes of extra-time if necessary
- Penalty shoot-out if scores still level
- Twelve named substitutes
- Maximum of three substitutions

=== Statistics ===
Overall
| Statistic | Germany | Brazil |
|---|---|---|
| Goals scored | 0 | 2 |
| Total shots | 12 | 9 |
| Shots on target | 4 | 7 |
| Ball possession | 56% | 44% |
| Corner kicks | 13 | 3 |
| Fouls committed | 21 | 19 |
| Offsides | 1 | 0 |
| Yellow cards | 1 | 1 |
| Second yellow card & red card | 0 | 0 |
| Red cards | 0 | 0 |

== Post-match ==
The win marked Brazil's fifth World Cup title, which as of 2026 remains the record, ahead of Germany and Italy with four titles each. Despite being at the match, the Japanese emperor Akihito did not join the ceremony of presenting the winners the World Cup trophy as it was against Japanese customs. FIFA president Sepp Blatter and former Brazilian World Cup winner Pelé gave the trophy to Brazilian captain Cafu on the pitch stage. Ronaldo was named as the official man of the match, while Kahn was awarded the Golden Ball for the best individual player of the tournament as a whole – as of 2026 the only goalkeeper to receive that award. He also received the Lev Yashin Award (known since 2010 as the Golden Glove) for best goalkeeper at the tournament. After the tournament, FIFA conducted a video review of the incident in the first Brazil–Turkey game involving Ünsal and Rivaldo and decided to fine the Brazilian 11,670 Swiss francs for deceiving the referee.

Scolari expressed his pleasure at the result after the match, as well as noting the happiness of the Brazilian population, saying they had "the joy of knowing we did our job, but it was full of very hard work. Brazil back as world champions – that is not something we can forget." Ronaldo said "The goals crowned my work and the work of the whole team. I worked for two years trying to recover from that injury and today God reserved this for me and the Brazilian team. I am very happy." Speaking about his role in Brazil's opening goal, Kahn said "It was my only mistake in the finals. It was ten times worse than any mistake I've ever made. There's no way I can make myself feel any better or make my mistake go away." Völler exonerated Kahn, however, saying "He has played a dream World Cup. He has made sensational saves, which no one could have expected". Regarding Germany's defeat, he said "When you lose a game the disappointment is great of course. But it is no shame to lose against a team like Brazil."

At the next World Cup in 2006, Germany – the hosts of that tournament – reached the semi-final where they were eliminated by eventual-winners Italy. Brazil failed in the defence of their title, being eliminated in the quarter-final by France. The next World Cup meeting between the two sides took place at the semi-finals of the 2014 tournament, which was held in Brazil. In a game described by Simon Burnton of The Guardian as being "of a savagery unwitnessed against significant opposition in the tournament's history", Germany won the game 7–1. They went on to win the 2014 World Cup, their sole tournament victory since the 2002 final while for Brazil, 2002 remains their most recent World Cup title as of 2026.

Over 200 nations and territories broadcast the final over radio and television. In total, 232 television channels broadcast the match, which was a new record for a World Cup Final (only later to be broken in 2006). The final had the highest television audience of the entire tournament, attracting over 63 million viewers in Nielsen-measured countries. Germany's match against South Korea was a close second, as with much of the host nation viewing the game. It was the highest-viewed non-finals match in World Cup history.

== See also ==
- Brazil at the FIFA World Cup
- Germany at the FIFA World Cup
