= Samuele Olivi =

Italian footballer

Personal information
- Date of birth: 1 August 1980 (age 46)
- Place of birth: Cesena, Italy
- Height: 1.83 m (6 ft 0 in)
- Position: Centre back

Team information
- Current team: Renate (technical collaborator)

Youth career
- Cesena

Senior career*
Years	Team	Apps	(Gls)
1999–2000	Cesena	18	(0)
2000–2005	Salernitana	105	(4)
2002–2003	→ Ascoli (loan)	7	(1)
2005–2009	Piacenza	118	(7)
2009–2011	Pescara	57	(7)
2011–2013	Grosseto	39	(2)
2013–2014	Mantova	25	(2)
2014–2015	Santarcangelo	29	(1)
2015–2016	Imolese	32	(2)
2016–2017	San Marino	5	(0)
2017–2020	La Fiorita	50	(3)
2020–2021	Libertas	6	(0)

International career
2000–2002	Italy U21	8	(0)
- * Club domestic league appearances and goals

Samuele Olivi (born 1 August 1980) is an Italian football manager and former player, who played as a defender. He is currently a technical collaborator to Andrea Dossena at Renate.

== Club career ==
Olivi started his career at hometown club Cesena. In 2000, Cesena were relegated from Serie B, and he was transferred to Salernitana, where he played for 4 1/2 seasons. He was a regular starter during the 2003–04 season, featuring in 44 out of 46 matches. The next season, however, he only made 10 appearances. In January 2005, he was signed by Piacenza, also in Serie B. In the first 1 1/2 seasons he was a regular starter. In the 2006–07 season, he played 22 Serie B matches, all as starter, and in the next season he played 28 matches, starting in 21 of them. After alternating between the starting eleven and the bench, he joined Pescara in August 2009.

He was released along with Massimo Ganci on 29 August 2011. On 31 August he was signed by U.S. Grosseto F.C.

On 7 June 2013 he was signed by Mantova F.C. in 2+1 year contract.

== International career ==
Olivi was in the Italy U18 squad that lost to Portugal U18 Team in the 1999 UEFA European Under-18 Football Championship final. He also capped for the Italy U20 team that lost to the Portugal U20 side in the 2000 Toulon Tournament semi-final, but that won against the Ivory Coast U20 side in the third-place match.

He was capped for the Italy U21 side during the team's 2002 UEFA European Under-21 Football Championship qualifying campaign.

== Coaching career ==
In June 2022, he was unveiled as part of Andrea Dossena's staff at Serie C club Renate.
