= Daniele Degano =

Italian footballer (born 1982)

Personal information
- Date of birth: 21 September 1982 (age 44)
- Place of birth: Crema, Italy
- Height: 1.86 m (6 ft 1 in)
- Position: Forward

Senior career*
Years	Team	Apps	(Gls)
1999–2000	Meda	1	(0)
2000–2002	Monza	39	(7)
2002–2004	Ancona	15	(3)
2004	→ Parma (loan)	4	(0)
2004–2005	Parma	2	(0)
2005–2007	Piacenza	81	(15)
2007–2008	Messina	34	(5)
2008–2009	Pisa	33	(2)
2009–2010	Pergocrema	10	(0)
2010	Crotone	19	(3)
2010–2011	Cosenza	26	(3)
2011–2012	Alessandria	16	(6)
2012	Rimini	13	(2)
2012–2013	Alessandria	25	(8)
2013–2014	Ancona	25	(9)
2014–2015	Civitanovese	30	(11)
2015–2016	Fermana	30	(12)
2016	Matelica	8	(1)
2016–2017	Recanatese	17	(4)
2017–2018	ASD Potenza Picena		
2018–2019	CS Loreto 1902		
2019–2020	Polisportiva San Biagio		
Total		428	(91)
- * Club domestic league appearances and goals

Daniele Degano (born 21 September 1982) is an Italian former footballer who played as a forward.

== Career ==
Degano played for Meda in the 1999–2000 season. The team had a friendly with F.C. Internazionale Milano in September 1999.

=== Monza ===
Since 2000 he played for Monza. In June 2001 he was signed by Parma along with Diego Daldosso, Massimo Ganci and Cristian Maggioni in co-ownership deal, for a total of 4 billion lire (1 billion lire each, or €516,457 each). In June 2002 Parma signed Degano and Maggioni outright and sold Daldosso and Ganci back to Monza.

=== Ancona ===
In August 2002 he moved to Ancona in new co-ownership from Parma to compensate the signing of Andrea Staffolani outright. Degano played for Ancona for 1 1/2 seasons.

=== Parma ===
In January 2004 he returned to Parma in a temporary deal. In June 2004 the co-ownership renewed in another year. However Ancona was declared bankrupted in 2004. In August 2004 he returned to Parma as free agent, with a handful playing time.

=== Piacenza ===
He was sold to Piacenza in January 2005, for €100,000. That window the club also signed former teammate Ganci.

=== Serie B clubs ===
In July 2007 he was signed by Messina for free in a 2-year deal. However the team also became bankrupt in July 2008 and all the players became free agents.

In August 2008 he was signed by another Serie B club Pisa, which the team also bankrupted after the season. In 2009, he moved to Pergocrema of the third division. In January 2010 he returned to Serie B again for Crotone.

=== Lega Pro ===
On 31 August 2010 he was transferred back to the third division for Cosenza.

On 23 August 2011 he was signed by Alessandria. On 31 January 2012 he moved to Rimini with Cristian Monac moved to opposite direction. Degano returned to Alessandria in July for the pre-season camp.

=== Serie D clubs ===
On 11 July 2015 he was signed by Fermana.
