= Brazil at the CONCACAF Gold Cup =

The CONCACAF Gold Cup is North America's major tournament in senior men's football and determines the continental champion. Until 1989, the tournament was known as CONCACAF Championship. It is currently held every two years. In earlier editions, the continental championship was held in different countries, but since the inception of the Gold Cup in 1991, the United States are constant hosts or co-hosts.

From 1973 to 1989, the tournament doubled as the confederation's World Cup qualification. CONCACAF's representative team at the FIFA Confederations Cup was decided by a play-off between the winners of the last two tournament editions in 2015 via the CONCACAF Cup, but was then discontinued along with the Confederations Cup.

Since the inaugural tournament in 1963, the Gold Cup was held 28 times and has been won by seven different nations, most often by Mexico (13 titles).

In select editions, teams from other confederations have regularly joined the tournament as invitees. During this time span, Brazil participated three times: in 1996, 1998 and 2003. They reached the tournament final twice, but lost to Mexico on both occasions. Thanks to their good results they rank 13th out of 33 nations in the tournament's all-time table, in spite of only three participations - right ahead of Cuba, who participated twelve times.

== Record at the CONCACAF Championship/Gold Cup ==
CONCACAF Gold Cup
Year	Result	Position	Pld	W	D	L	GF	GA
(United States) 1996	Runners-up	2nd	4	3	0	1	10	3
(United States) 1998	Third place	3rd	5	2	2	1	6	2
(Mexico) (United States) 2003	Runners-up	2nd	5	3	0	2	6	4
Total	3/28	13/33	14	8	2	4	22	9

== 1996 CONCACAF Gold Cup ==
=== Group C ===
Team	Pld	W	D	L	GF	GA	GD	Pts
Brazil	2	2	0	0	9	1	+8	6
Canada	2	1	0	1	4	5	–1	3
Honduras	2	0	0	2	1	8	–7	0

January 12, 1996

Brazil	4–1	Canada
André Luis 3'; Caio 7'; Sávio 14'; Leandro Machado 86'	Report	Radzinski 66'

Los Angeles Memorial Coliseum, Los Angeles
Attendance: 8,234
Referee: Ronald Gutiérrez (Costa Rica)

January 14, 1996

Brazil	5–0	Honduras
Caio 9', 81'; Jamelli 31', 61'; Sávio 80'	Report

Los Angeles Memorial Coliseum, Los Angeles
Attendance: 20,708
Referee: Armando Archundia (Mexico)

=== Semi-final ===
January 18, 1996

United States	0–1	Brazil
	Report	Balboa 79' (o.g.)

Los Angeles Memorial Coliseum
Attendance: 20,708
Referee: Armando Archundia (Mexico)

=== Final ===
January 21, 1996

Brazil	0–2	Mexico
	Report	L. García 54'; Blanco 75'

Los Angeles Memorial Coliseum, Los Angeles
Attendance: 88,155
Referee: Ramesh Ramdhan (Trinidad and Tobago)

== 1998 CONCACAF Gold Cup ==
=== Group A ===
Team	Pld	W	D	L	GF	GA	GD	Pts
Jamaica	3	2	1	0	5	2	+3	7
Brazil	3	1	2	0	5	1	+4	5
Guatemala	3	0	2	1	3	4	−1	2
El Salvador	3	0	1	2	0	6	−6	1

February 3, 1998

Brazil	0–0	Jamaica
	Report

Orange Bowl, Miami
Attendance: 43,754
Referee: Esfandiar Baharmast (United States)
February 5, 1998

Brazil	1–1	Guatemala
Romário 79'	Report	Plata 90'

Orange Bowl, Miami
Attendance: 17,842
Referee: Ramesh Ramdhan (Trinidad and Tobago)
February 8, 1998

El Salvador	0–4	Brazil
	Report	Edmundo 7'; Romário 19'; Élber 87', 90'

Los Angeles Memorial Coliseum, Los Angeles
Attendance: 55,017
Referee: Rodrigo Badilla (Costa Rica)

=== Semi-final ===
February 10, 1998

United States	1–0	Brazil
Preki 65'	Report

Los Angeles Memorial Coliseum, Los Angeles
Attendance: 12,298
Referee: Ali Bujsaim (United Arab Emirates)

=== Third-place match ===
February 15, 1998

Brazil	1–0	Jamaica
Romário 77'	Report

Los Angeles Memorial Coliseum, Los Angeles
Attendance: 91,255
Referee: Ali Bujsaim (United Arab Emirates)

== 2003 CONCACAF Gold Cup ==
=== Group A ===
Team	Pld	W	D	L	GF	GA	GD	Pts
Mexico	2	1	1	0	1	0	+1	4
Brazil	2	1	0	1	2	2	0	3
Honduras	2	0	1	1	1	2	-1	1

July 12, 2003

Mexico	1–0	Brazil
Borgetti 70'	Report

Estadio Azteca, Mexico City
Attendance: 75,000
Referee: Rodolfo Sibrian (El Salvador)
July 14, 2003

Brazil	2–1	Honduras
Maicon 16'; Diego 84'	Report	De León 90' (pen.)

Estadio Azteca, Mexico City
Attendance: 3,000
Referee: Mauricio Navarro (Canada)

=== Quarter-final ===
July 19, 2003

Colombia	0–2	Brazil
	Report	Kaká 42', 66'

Orange Bowl, Miami
Attendance: 23,425
Referee: Ken Stott (United States)

=== Semi-final ===
July 23, 2003

United States	1–2 (ASDET)	Brazil
Bocanegra 62'	Report	Kaká 89'; Diego 100' (pen.)

Orange Bowl, Miami
Attendance: 35,211
Referee: Carlos Alberto Batres (Guatemala)

=== Final ===
July 27, 2003

Mexico	1–0 (ASDET)	Brazil
Osorno 97'	Report

Estadio Azteca, Mexico City
Attendance: 85,000
Referee: Mauricio Navarro (Canada)

== Record players ==
Rank	Player	Matches	Gold Cups
1	Flávio Conceição	9	1996 and 1998
1	Zé Maria	9	1996 and 1998
3	Edmundo	5	1998
3	Gonçalves	5	1998
3	Júnior	5	1998
3	Romário	5	1998
3	Taffarel	5	1998
3	Zinho	5	1998
3	Adriano	5	2003
3	Alex	5	2003
3	Diego	5	2003
3	Heurelho Gomes	5	2003
3	Júlio Baptista	5	2003
3	Kaká	5	2003
3	Luisão	5	2003
3	Maicon	5	2003
3	Paulo Almeida	5	2003
3	Robinho	5	2003

== Top goalscorers ==
At each of Brazil's three Gold Cup participations, one player scored three goals during the tournament.

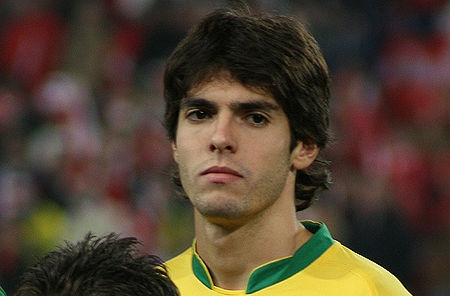
Kaká scored three goals at Brazil's last Gold Cup participation in 2003 and was voted into that year's team of the tournament.

Rank	Player	Goals	Gold Cups
1	Caio	3	1996
1	Romário	3	1998
1	Kaká	3	2003
4	Jamelli	2	1996
4	Sávio	2	1996
4	Élber	2	1998
4	Diego	2	2003
8	André Luiz	1	1996
8	Leandro	1	1996
8	Edmundo	1	1998
8	Maicon	1	2003

== See also ==
- Brazil at the Copa América
- Brazil at the FIFA Confederations Cup
- Brazil at the FIFA World Cup

== Head-to-head record ==
Opponent	Pld	W	D	L	GF	GA	GD	Win %
Canada	1	1	0	0	4	1	+3	100.00
Colombia	1	1	0	0	2	0	+2	100.00
El Salvador	1	1	0	0	4	0	+4	100.00
Guatemala	1	0	1	0	1	1	+0	0.00
Honduras	2	2	0	0	7	1	+6	100.00
Jamaica	2	1	1	0	1	0	+1	50.00
Mexico	3	0	0	3	0	4	−4	0.00
United States	3	2	0	1	3	2	+1	66.67
Total	14	8	2	4	22	9	+13	57.14
