= Paolo Guastalvino =

Italian footballer

Personal information
- Date of birth: 23 June 1979 (age 47)
- Place of birth: Perugia, Italy
- Height: 1.82 m (5 ft 11 1/2 in)
- Position: Defender

Senior career*
Years	Team	Apps	(Gls)
1997–1998	Perugia	4	(0)
1998–2001	Ancona	88	(0)
2001–2005	Vicenza	57	(0)
2005–2006	Sambenedettese	10	(0)
2006	Benevento	5	(0)
2006–2010	Foligno	107	(0)
2010–2012	Castel Rigone	50	(1)
- * Club domestic league appearances and goals

Paolo Guastalvino (born 23 June 1979) is an Italian former footballer who played as a defender.

== Career ==
Guastalvino started his career at hometown club Perugia. in 1998 he joined Ancona.

=== Vicenza ===
In summer 2001 Guastalvino was signed by Parma for undisclosed fee along with Andrea Staffolani (1.5 billion lire) but re-sold to Vicenza in co-ownership deal for 2.5 billion lire (€1,291,142). Guastalvino played 28 games in 2001–02 Serie B. Guastalvino was signed by Vicenza outright in June 2002 for undisclosed fee and Parma signed half of Christian Maggio for 4 billion lire (€2,065,827). However, in the next 3 seasons he played a total of 29 games only.

=== Lega Pro clubs ===
Guastalvino left Vicenza in 2005. He played for Sambenedettese and Benevento respectively in 2005–06 season. In August 2006 he settled in Foligno. The club won 2006–07 Serie C2 group B and finished last in 2007 Supercoppa di Lega di Seconda Divisione. He played for the club in Italian third division for 3 seasons, all secured the seat for the next season.

=== Serie D clubs ===
In the summer of 2010 he moved down 2 divisions to Serie D club Castel Rigone for the 2010–11 Serie D season, located in his home province – the province of Perugia.

== Honours ==
Foligno

- Serie C2: 2006–07
