= Brazil at the FIFA World Cup =

International football delegation

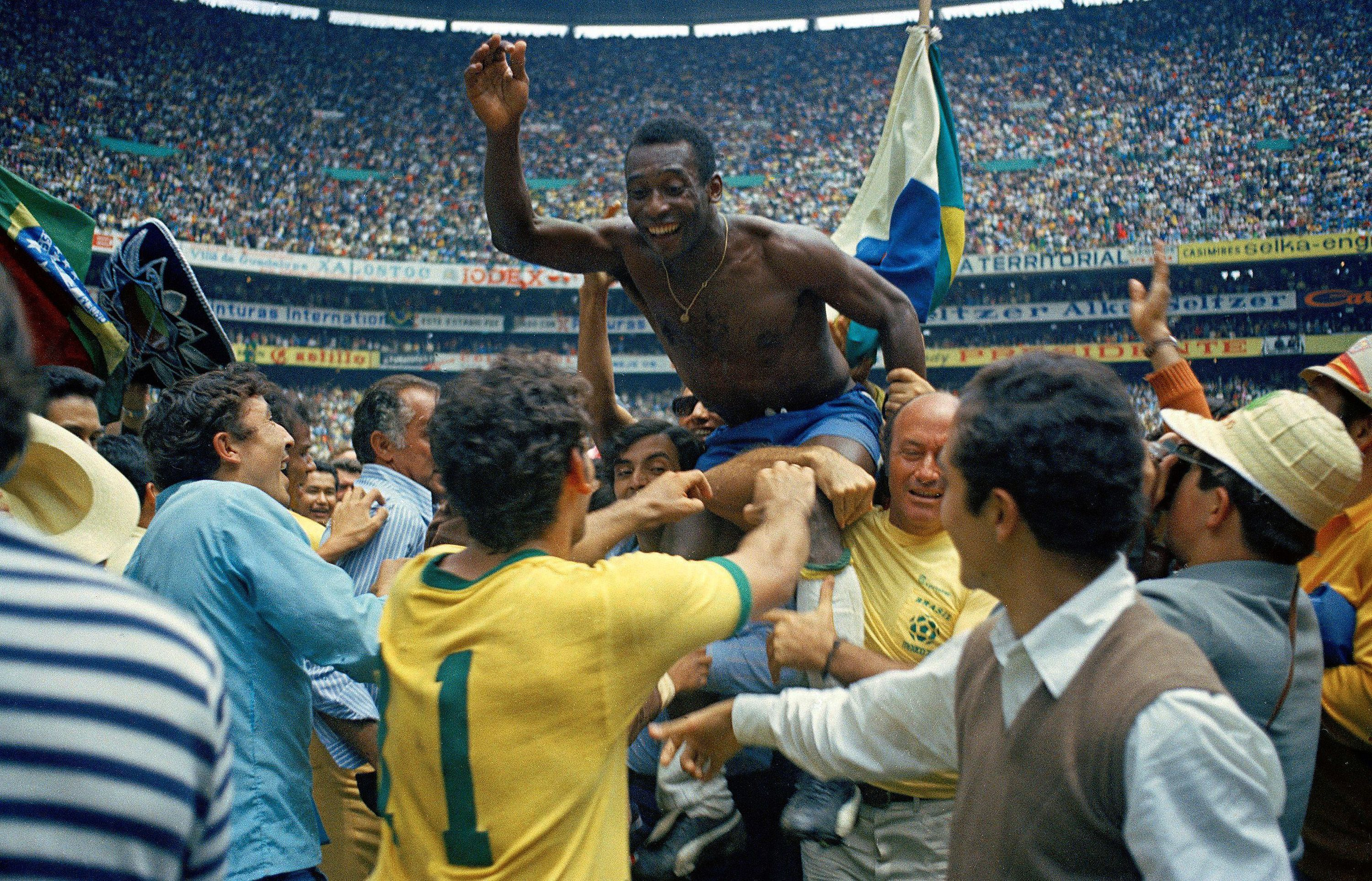
Pelé celebrating Brazil's win of the 1970 FIFA World Cup in Mexico

This article summarizes the results and overall performance of Brazil at the FIFA World Cup, including the qualification phase and the final phase, officially called the World Cup finals. The qualification phase, which currently takes place over the three years preceding the finals, is used to determine which teams qualify for the finals. The current format of the finals involves 48 teams competing for the title, at venues within the host country.

Brazil is the most successful national team in the history of the World Cup, having won five titles and earned second place, third place, and fourth place finishes twice each. Brazil is one of four countries along with Argentina, Spain, and Germany to win a FIFA World Cup away from its continent (Sweden 1958, Chile 1962, Mexico 1970, United States 1994, and South Korea/Japan 2002). Brazil is also the only national team to have played in all FIFA World Cup editions without any absence or need for play-offs. Brazil also has the best overall performance in World Cup history in both proportional and absolute terms, with a record of 79 victories in 119 matches played, 135 goal difference, 257 points, and only 20 losses across 23 tournaments.

Traditionally, Brazil's greatest rival is Argentina. The two countries have met each other four times in the history of the FIFA World Cup, with two wins for Brazil (West Germany 1974 and Spain 1982), one for Argentina (Italy 1990), and a draw (Argentina 1978). The country that played the most matches against Brazil at the World Cup is Sweden: seven times, with five wins for Brazil and two draws. Three other historical rivals are Italy, which lost two World Cup finals against Brazil and eliminated the Brazilians in two tournaments (France 1938 and Spain 1982), France, which defeated Brazil on three occasions (Mexico 1986, France 1998, and Germany 2006), and the Netherlands, which has eliminated Brazil at two of their five meetings (West Germany 1974 and South Africa 2010), were themselves eliminated at two others (USA 1994 and France 1998) and won the match for third place in Brazil 2014.

== FIFA World Cup record ==
Champions Runners-up Third place Fourth place Tournament played fully or partially on home soil

Year	Round	Position	Pld	W	D*	L	GF	GA
(Uruguay) 1930	Group stage	6th	2	1	0	1	5	2
(Italy) 1934	Round of 16	14th	1	0	0	1	1	3
(France) 1938	Third place	3rd	5	3	1	1	14	11
(Brazil) 1950	Runners-up	2nd	6	4	1	1	22	6
(Switzerland) 1954	Quarter-finals	5th	3	1	1	1	8	5
(Sweden) 1958	Champions	1st	6	5	1	0	16	4
(Chile) 1962	Champions	1st	6	5	1	0	14	5
(England) 1966	Group stage	11th	3	1	0	2	4	6
(Mexico) 1970	Champions	1st	6	6	0	0	19	7
(West Germany) 1974	Fourth place	4th	7	3	2	2	6	4
(Argentina) 1978	Third place	3rd	7	4	3	0	10	3
(Spain) 1982	Second group stage	5th	5	4	0	1	15	6
(Mexico) 1986	Quarter-finals	5th	5	4	1	0	10	1
(Italy) 1990	Round of 16	9th	4	3	0	1	4	2
(United States) 1994	Champions	1st	7	5	2	0	11	3
(France) 1998	Runners-up	2nd	7	4	1	2	14	10
(South Korea) (Japan) 2002	Champions	1st	7	7	0	0	18	4
(Germany) 2006	Quarter-finals	5th	5	4	0	1	10	2
(South Africa) 2010	Quarter-finals	6th	5	3	1	1	9	4
(Brazil) 2014	Fourth place	4th	7	3	2	2	11	14
(Russia) 2018	Quarter-finals	6th	5	3	1	1	8	3
(Qatar) 2022	Quarter-finals	7th	5	3	1	1	8	3
(Canada) (Mexico) (United States) 2026	Round of 16	11th	5	3	1	1	10	4
(Morocco) (Portugal) (Spain) 2030	To be determined							
(Saudi Arabia) 2034	To be determined							
Total	23/23	5 Titles	119	79	20	20	247	112

*Draws include knockout matches decided via penalty shoot-out.

Brazil's World Cup record
First match	Brazil 1–2 Yugoslavia (14 July 1930; Montevideo, Uruguay)
Biggest win	Brazil 7–1 Sweden (9 July 1950; Rio de Janeiro, Brazil)
Biggest defeat	Brazil 1–7 Germany (8 July 2014; Belo Horizonte, Brazil)
Best result	Champions in 1958, 1962, 1970, 1994, 2002
Worst result	First round in 1934, group stage in 1930 and 1966

=== World Cup titles ===
Year	Manager	Captain	Goalscorer(s) in final
1958	Vicente Feola	Bellini	Vavá (2), Pelé (2), Zagallo
1962	Aymoré Moreira	Mauro Ramos	Amarildo, Zito, Vavá
1970	Mário Zagallo	Carlos Alberto Torres	Pelé, Gérson, Jairzinho, Carlos Alberto Torres
1994	Carlos Alberto Parreira	Dunga	N/A
2002	Luiz Felipe Scolari	Cafu	Ronaldo (2)

== By match ==
Year	Round	Opponents	Score	Brazil scorers
(Uruguay) 1930	Group B	Yugoslavia	1–2	Preguinho
(Uruguay) 1930	Group B	Bolivia	4–0	Moderato (2), Preguinho (2)
(Italy) 1934	Round of 16	Spain	1–3	Leônidas da Silva
(France) 1938	Round of 16	Poland	6–5 (a.e.t.)	Leônidas da Silva (3), Romeu, Perácio (2)
(France) 1938	Quarter-finals	Czechoslovakia	1–1 (a.e.t.)	Leônidas da Silva
(France) 1938	Quarter-finals (replay)	Czechoslovakia	2–1	Leônidas da Silva, Roberto
(France) 1938	Semi-finals	Italy	1–2	Romeu
(France) 1938	Match for third place	Sweden	4–2	Romeu, Leônidas da Silva (2), Perácio
(Brazil) 1950	Group A	Mexico	4–0	Ademir (2), Jair, Baltazar
(Brazil) 1950	Group A	Switzerland	2–2	Alfredo, Baltazar
(Brazil) 1950	Group A	Yugoslavia	2–0	Ademir, Zizinho
(Brazil) 1950	Final round	Sweden	7–1	Ademir (4), Chico (2), Maneca
(Brazil) 1950	Final round	Spain	6–1	Ademir (2), Jair, Chico (2), Zizinho
(Brazil) 1950	Final	Uruguay	1–2	Friaça
(Switzerland) 1954	Group A	Mexico	5–0	Baltazar, Didi, Pinga (2), Julinho
(Switzerland) 1954	Group A	Yugoslavia	1–1 (a.e.t.)	Didi
(Switzerland) 1954	Quarter-finals	Hungary	2–4	Djalma Santos, Julinho
(Sweden) 1958	Group D	Austria	3–0	Mazzola (2), Nilton Santos
(Sweden) 1958	Group D	England	0–0	—
(Sweden) 1958	Group D	Soviet Union	2–0	Vavá (2)
(Sweden) 1958	Quarter-finals	Wales	1–0	Pelé
(Sweden) 1958	Semi-finals	France	5–2	Vavá, Didi, Pelé (3)
(Sweden) 1958	Final	Sweden	5–2	Vavá (2), Pelé (2), Zagallo
(Chile) 1962	Group C	Mexico	2–0	Pelé, Zagallo
(Chile) 1962	Group C	Czechoslovakia	0–0	—
(Chile) 1962	Group C	Spain	2–1	Amarildo (2)
(Chile) 1962	Quarter-finals	England	3–1	Garrincha (2), Vavá
(Chile) 1962	Semi-finals	Chile	4–2	Garrincha (2), Vavá (2)
(Chile) 1962	Final	Czechoslovakia	3–1	Amarildo, Zito, Vavá
(England) 1966	Group C	Bulgaria	2–0	Pelé, Garrincha
(England) 1966	Group C	Hungary	1–3	Tostão
(England) 1966	Group C	Portugal	1–3	Rildo
(Mexico) 1970	Group C	Czechoslovakia	4–1	Rivellino, Pelé, Jairzinho (2)
(Mexico) 1970	Group C	England	1–0	Jairzinho
(Mexico) 1970	Group C	Romania	3–2	Pelé (2), Jairzinho
(Mexico) 1970	Quarter-finals	Peru	4–2	Rivellino, Tostão (2), Jairzinho
(Mexico) 1970	Semi-finals	Uruguay	3–1	Clodoaldo, Jairzinho, Rivellino
(Mexico) 1970	Final	Italy	4–1	Pelé, Gérson, Jairzinho, Carlos Alberto
(West Germany) 1974	Group 2	Yugoslavia	0–0	—
(West Germany) 1974	Group 2	Scotland	0–0	—
(West Germany) 1974	Group 2	Zaire	3–0	Jairzinho, Rivellino, Valdomiro
(West Germany) 1974	Group A	East Germany	1–0	Rivellino
(West Germany) 1974	Group A	Argentina	2–1	Rivellino, Jairzinho
(West Germany) 1974	Group A	Netherlands	0–2	—
(West Germany) 1974	Match for third place	Poland	0–1	—
(Argentina) 1978	Group 3	Sweden	1–1	Reinaldo
(Argentina) 1978	Group 3	Spain	0–0	—
(Argentina) 1978	Group 3	Austria	1–0	Roberto Dinamite
(Argentina) 1978	Group B	Peru	3–0	Dirceu (2), Zico
(Argentina) 1978	Group B	Argentina	0–0	—
(Argentina) 1978	Group B	Poland	3–1	Nelinho, Roberto Dinamite (2)
(Argentina) 1978	Match for third place	Italy	2–1	Nelinho, Dirceu
(Spain) 1982	Group 6	Soviet Union	2–1	Sócrates, Éder
(Spain) 1982	Group 6	Scotland	4–1	Zico, Oscar, Éder, Falcão
(Spain) 1982	Group 6	New Zealand	4–0	Zico (2), Falcão, Serginho
(Spain) 1982	Group C	Argentina	3–1	Zico, Serginho, Júnior
(Spain) 1982	Group C	Italy	2–3	Sócrates, Falcão
(Mexico) 1986	Group D	Spain	1–0	Sócrates
(Mexico) 1986	Group D	Algeria	1–0	Careca
(Mexico) 1986	Group D	Northern Ireland	3–0	Careca (2), Josimar
(Mexico) 1986	Round of 16	Poland	4–0	Sócrates, Josimar, Edinho, Careca
(Mexico) 1986	Quarter-finals	France	1–1 (a.e.t.) (3–4 p)	Careca
(Italy) 1990	Group C	Sweden	2–1	Careca (2)
(Italy) 1990	Group C	Costa Rica	1–0	Müller
(Italy) 1990	Group C	Scotland	1–0	Müller
(Italy) 1990	Round of 16	Argentina	0–1	—
(United States) 1994	Group B	Russia	2–0	Romário, Raí
(United States) 1994	Group B	Cameroon	3–0	Romário, Márcio Santos, Bebeto
(United States) 1994	Group B	Sweden	1–1	Romário
(United States) 1994	Round of 16	United States	1–0	Bebeto
(United States) 1994	Quarter-finals	Netherlands	3–2	Romário, Bebeto, Branco
(United States) 1994	Semi-finals	Sweden	1–0	Romário
(United States) 1994	Final	Italy	0–0 (a.e.t.) (3–2 p)	—
(France) 1998	Group A	Scotland	2–1	César Sampaio, Boyd (OG)
(France) 1998	Group A	Morocco	3–0	Ronaldo, Rivaldo, Bebeto
(France) 1998	Group A	Norway	1–2	Bebeto
(France) 1998	Round of 16	Chile	4–1	Ronaldo (2), César Sampaio (2)
(France) 1998	Quarter-finals	Denmark	3–2	Bebeto, Rivaldo (2)
(France) 1998	Semi-finals	Netherlands	1–1 (a.e.t.) (4–2 p)	Ronaldo
(France) 1998	Final	France	0–3	—
(South Korea) (Japan) 2002	Group C	Turkey	2–1	Ronaldo, Rivaldo
(South Korea) (Japan) 2002	Group C	China	4–0	Roberto Carlos, Rivaldo, Ronaldinho, Ronaldo
(South Korea) (Japan) 2002	Group C	Costa Rica	5–2	Ronaldo (2), Edmílson, Rivaldo, Júnior
(South Korea) (Japan) 2002	Round of 16	Belgium	2–0	Rivaldo, Ronaldo
(South Korea) (Japan) 2002	Quarter-finals	England	2–1	Rivaldo, Ronaldinho
(South Korea) (Japan) 2002	Semi-finals	Turkey	1–0	Ronaldo
(South Korea) (Japan) 2002	Final	Germany	2–0	Ronaldo (2)
(Germany) 2006	Group F	Croatia	1–0	Kaká
(Germany) 2006	Group F	Australia	2–0	Adriano, Fred
(Germany) 2006	Group F	Japan	4–1	Ronaldo (2), Juninho, Gilberto
(Germany) 2006	Round of 16	Ghana	3–0	Adriano, Ronaldo, Zé Roberto
(Germany) 2006	Quarter-finals	France	0–1	—
(South Africa) 2010	Group G	North Korea	2–1	Maicon, Elano
(South Africa) 2010	Group G	Ivory Coast	3–1	Luís Fabiano (2), Elano
(South Africa) 2010	Group G	Portugal	0–0	—
(South Africa) 2010	Round of 16	Chile	3–0	Juan, Luís Fabiano, Robinho
(South Africa) 2010	Quarter-finals	Netherlands	1–2	Robinho
(Brazil) 2014	Group A	Croatia	3–1	Neymar (2), Oscar
(Brazil) 2014	Group A	Mexico	0–0	—
(Brazil) 2014	Group A	Cameroon	4–1	Neymar (2), Fred, Fernandinho
(Brazil) 2014	Round of 16	Chile	1–1 (a.e.t.) (3–2 p)	David Luiz
(Brazil) 2014	Quarter-finals	Colombia	2–1	Thiago Silva, David Luiz
(Brazil) 2014	Semi-finals	Germany	1–7	Oscar
(Brazil) 2014	Match for third place	Netherlands	0–3	—
(Russia) 2018	Group E	Switzerland	1–1	Philippe Coutinho
(Russia) 2018	Group E	Costa Rica	2–0	Philippe Coutinho, Neymar
(Russia) 2018	Group E	Serbia	2–0	Paulinho, Thiago Silva
(Russia) 2018	Round of 16	Mexico	2–0	Neymar, Roberto Firmino
(Russia) 2018	Quarter-finals	Belgium	1–2	Renato Augusto
(Qatar) 2022	Group G	Serbia	2–0	Richarlison (2)
(Qatar) 2022	Group G	Switzerland	1–0	Casemiro
(Qatar) 2022	Group G	Cameroon	0–1	—
(Qatar) 2022	Round of 16	South Korea	4–1	Vinícius, Neymar, Richarlison, Lucas Paquetá
(Qatar) 2022	Quarter-finals	Croatia	1–1 (a.e.t.) (2–4 p)	Neymar
(Canada) (Mexico) (United States) 2026	Group C	Morocco	1–1	Vinícius
(Canada) (Mexico) (United States) 2026	Group C	Haiti	3–0	Cunha (2), Vinícius
(Canada) (Mexico) (United States) 2026	Group C	Scotland	3–0	Vinícius (2), Cunha
(Canada) (Mexico) (United States) 2026	Round of 32	Japan	2–1	Casemiro, Martinelli
(Canada) (Mexico) (United States) 2026	Round of 16	Norway	1–2	Neymar

== By opponent ==
Opponent	Pld	W	D	L	GF	GA	GD	Win %
Argentina	4	2	1	1	5	3	+2	50.00
Algeria	1	1	0	0	1	0	+1	100.00
Australia	1	1	0	0	2	0	+2	100.00
Austria	2	2	0	0	4	0	+4	100.00
Belgium	2	1	0	1	3	2	+1	50.00
Bolivia	1	1	0	0	4	0	+4	100.00
Bulgaria	1	1	0	0	2	0	+2	100.00
Cameroon	3	2	0	1	7	2	+5	66.67
China	1	1	0	0	4	0	+4	100.00
Chile	4	3	1	0	12	4	+8	75.00
Colombia	1	1	0	0	2	1	+1	100.00
Costa Rica	3	3	0	0	8	2	+6	100.00
Croatia	3	2	1	0	5	2	+3	66.67
Czechoslovakia	5	3	2	0	10	4	+6	60.00
Denmark	1	1	0	0	3	2	+1	100.00
East Germany	1	1	0	0	1	0	+1	100.00
England	4	3	1	0	6	2	+4	75.00
France	4	1	1	2	6	7	−1	25.00
Germany	2	1	0	1	3	7	−4	50.00
Ghana	1	1	0	0	3	0	+3	100.00
Haiti	1	1	0	0	3	0	+3	100.00
Hungary	2	0	0	2	3	7	−4	0.00
Italy	5	2	1	2	9	7	+2	40.00
Ivory Coast	1	1	0	0	3	1	+2	100.00
Japan	2	2	0	0	6	2	+4	100.00
Mexico	5	4	1	0	13	0	+13	80.00
Morocco	2	1	1	0	4	1	+3	50.00
Netherlands	5	1	1	3	5	10	−5	20.00
New Zealand	1	1	0	0	4	0	+4	100.00
Northern Ireland	1	1	0	0	3	0	+3	100.00
North Korea	1	1	0	0	2	1	+1	100.00
Norway	2	0	0	2	2	4	−2	0.00
Peru	2	2	0	0	7	2	+5	100.00
Poland	4	3	0	1	13	7	+6	75.00
Portugal	2	0	1	1	1	3	−2	0.00
Romania	1	1	0	0	3	2	+1	100.00
Russia	1	1	0	0	2	0	+2	100.00
Scotland	5	4	1	0	10	2	+8	80.00
Serbia	2	2	0	0	4	0	+4	100.00
South Korea	1	1	0	0	4	1	+3	100.00
Soviet Union	2	2	0	0	4	1	+3	100.00
Spain	5	3	1	1	10	5	+5	60.00
Sweden	7	5	2	0	21	8	+13	71.43
Switzerland	3	1	2	0	4	3	+1	33.33
Turkey	2	2	0	0	3	1	+2	100.00
United States	1	1	0	0	1	0	+1	100.00
Uruguay	2	1	0	1	4	3	+1	50.00
Wales	1	1	0	0	1	0	+1	100.00
Yugoslavia	4	1	2	1	4	3	+1	25.00
Zaire	1	1	0	0	3	0	+3	100.00
Total	119	79	20	20	247	112	+135	66.39

== Record players ==
=== Most matches played ===
Brazil's record World Cup appearance maker Cafu is also the only individual to have ever played in three consecutive FIFA World Cup finals (1994, 1998 and 2002).

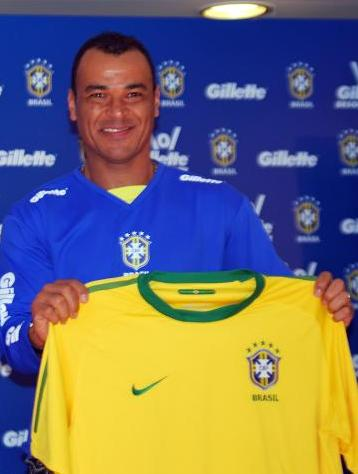
Cafu won the World Cup twice (1994 and 2002) and is Brazil's record appearance maker in the competition.

Rank	Player	Matches	World Cups
1	Cafu	20	1994, 1998, 2002, 2006
2	Ronaldo	19	1994, 1998, 2002, 2006
3	Cláudio Taffarel	18	1990, 1994, 1998
3	Dunga	18	1990, 1994, 1998
5	Roberto Carlos	17	1998, 2002, 2006
5	Lúcio	17	2002, 2006, 2010
7	Jairzinho	16	1966, 1970, 1974
7	Gilberto Silva	16	2002, 2006, 2010
9	Nílton Santos	15	1950, 1954, 1958, 1962
9	Didi	15	1954, 1958, 1962
9	Rivellino	15	1970, 1974, 1978
9	Bebeto	15	1990, 1994, 1998
9	Neymar	15	2014, 2018, 2022, 2026

=== Most tournaments ===
Nine individuals have been part of Brazil's squad at a record four different World Cup editions, with four of these players having made at least one appearance in all four tournaments. Goalkeeper Émerson Leão is the only Brazilian to have been in four World Cup squads non-consecutively, having not been called up in 1982.

Editions	Rank	World Cups
4	Carlos Castilho	(1950), 1954, (1958), (1962)
4	Nílton Santos	(1950), 1954, 1958, 1962
4	Djalma Santos	1954, 1958, 1962, 1966
4	Pelé	1958, 1962, 1966, 1970
4	Émerson Leão	(1970), 1974, 1978, (1986)
4	Cafu	1994, 1998, 2002, 2006
4	Ronaldo	(1994), 1998, 2002, 2006
4	Thiago Silva	(2010), 2014, 2018, 2022
4	Neymar	2014, 2018, 2022, 2026

- Years in brackets indicate that the player was part of the squad but did not play in any matches.

== Top goalscorers ==
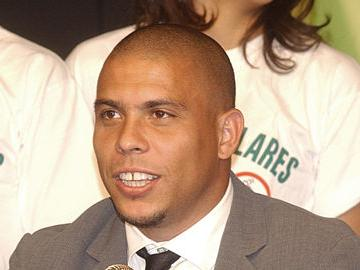
With 15 goals, Ronaldo is the fourth-highest goalscorer in World Cup history, having formerly been ranked first.

Five Brazilians have won the World Cup Golden Boot Award over the years: Leônidas with seven goals in 1938, Ademir with nine goals in 1950, Garrincha and Vavá with four goals each in 1962, and Ronaldo with eight goals in 2002.

Rank	Player	Goals	World Cups
1	Ronaldo	15	1998 (4), 2002 (8), 2006 (3)
2	Pelé	12	1958 (6), 1962 (1), 1966 (1), 1970 (4)
3	Neymar	9	2014 (4), 2018 (2), 2022 (2), 2026 (1)
3	Ademir	9	1950
3	Vavá	9	1958 (5), 1962 (4)
3	Jairzinho	9	1970 (7), 1974 (2)
7	Leônidas	8	1934 (1), 1938 (7)
7	Rivaldo	8	1998 (3), 2002 (5)
9	Careca	7	1986 (5), 1990 (2)
10	Bebeto	6	1994 (3), 1998 (3)
10	Rivellino	6	1970 (3), 1974 (3)

== Players provided by club ==
Below is the list of clubs that have provided more than five players for Brazil throughout the FIFA World Cup editions:

Club	Total players
(Brazil) Botafogo	47
(Brazil) São Paulo	46
(Brazil) Flamengo	36
(Brazil) Vasco da Gama	34
(Brazil) Fluminense	32
(Brazil) Corinthians	24
(Brazil) Palmeiras	24
(Brazil) Santos	24
(Spain) Real Madrid	13
(Brazil) Atlético Mineiro	12
(Spain) Barcelona	11
(Brazil) Cruzeiro	11
(Italy) Roma	10
(Italy) Internazionale	9
(France) Paris Saint-Germain	9
(Brazil) Grêmio	8
(Brazil) Internacional	8
(Italy) Milan	7
(Portugal) Benfica	6
(England) Chelsea	6
(Italy) Juventus	6
(England) Manchester City	6
(Brazil) Portuguesa	6

Notes

- 1930: Some sources claim that players Doca (São Cristóvão) and Benevenuto (Flamengo) were not officially entered at the 1930 squad. This count includes Benevenuto and Doca. Araken never played for Flamengo, but he was registered as a club athlete just as a matter of formality, since APEA (São Paulo) was in a power struggle over command of Brazilian football with the CBD, situated in Rio de Janeiro. The player, in fact, had terminated with Santos and signed with São Paulo.
- 1934: This count does not include players who didn't travel to Italy and stayed on stand-by in Brazil: Almeida (Bahia), Bilé (Ypiranga-SP), Jaguaré (Corinthians) and Pamplona (Botafogo). Neither includes Domingos da Guia, barred from participating in the competition by Nacional Montevideo, who had already ceded Patesko and demanded a high compensation fee.

== Awards and records ==
=== Team awards ===
- (gold) Champions (5): 1958, 1962, 1970, 1994, 2002
- (silver) Runners-up (2): 1950, 1998
- (bronze) Third place (2): 1938, 1978
- Fair Play Trophy: 1982, 1986, 1994, 2006
- Most Entertaining Team: 1994

=== Individual awards ===
==== Golden Ball award ====
- Golden Ball:
  - Leônidas (1938; unofficial)
  - Zizinho (1950; unofficial)
  - Didi (1958; unofficial)
  - Garrincha (1962; unofficial)
  - Pelé (1970; unofficial)
  - Romário (1994)
  - Ronaldo (1998; youngest Golden Ball winner, aged 21)
- Silver Ball:
  - Pelé (1958; unofficial)
  - Gérson (1970; unofficial)
  - Falcão (1982)
  - Ronaldo (2002)
- Bronze Ball:
  - Ademir (1950; unofficial)
  - Dirceu (1978; unofficial)

==== Golden Boot award ====
- Golden Boot:
  - Leônidas (1938; retrospective)
  - Ademir (1950; retrospective)
  - Garrincha and Vavá (shared, 1962; retrospective)
  - Ronaldo (2002)
- Silver Boot:
  - Pelé (1958; retrospective)
  - Jairzinho (1970; retrospective)
  - Careca (1986)
  - Rivaldo (2002)
- Bronze Boot:
  - Chico (1950; retrospective)
  - Zico (1982)
  - Romário (1994)
  - Ronaldo (2006)
  - Neymar (2014)

==== Best Young Player award ====
- Pelé (1958; youngest Best Young Player winner, aged 17)

==== Other individual awards ====
- World Cup final Player of the Match: Ronaldo (2002)

=== Team records ===
- Most titles (5)
- Most participations (23)
- Most matches played (119)
- Most victories (79)
- Most goals scored (247)
- Best goal difference (+135)
- Joint-most red cards (11)
- Most finishes in the top 5 (15), top 8 (19), top 10 (20) and top 16 (23)
- Most consecutive wins (11, 2002–2006)
- Most tournaments finishing unbeaten (7)
- Only team to win all matches in two World Cups (1970 and 2002)
- One of two teams to have defended their title as champions (1962)
- One of two teams to have progressed to three consecutive World Cup finals (1994–2002)
- Joint-most wins in one tournament (7, 2002)
- Joint-best goal difference as champion (+14, 2002)

=== Individual records ===
- Pelé holds a number of FIFA World Cup records:
  - Only player to win three FIFA World Cups (1958, 1962 and 1970)
  - Youngest tournament winner (1958, aged 17 years and 249 days)
  - Youngest goalscorer (1958 v Wales, aged 17 years and 239 days)
  - Youngest hat-trick scorer (1958 v France, aged 17 years and 244 days)
  - Youngest goalscorer in a final (1958 v Sweden, aged 17 years and 249 days)
- Youngest Golden Ball winner: Ronaldo (1998, aged 21 years and 297 days)
- Most appearances in the All-Star Team: Djalma Santos (3, 1954–1962) (shared with Franz Beckenbauer and Philipp Lahm)
- Most tournament wins as player and coach: Mário Zagallo (3, 1958 and 1962 as player, 1970 as coach)
- Only player to appear in three consecutive FIFA World Cup finals: Cafu (1994, 1998 and 2002)
- Most team awards won: Cafu (4, 1994–2006)

== See also ==
- Brazil at the CONCACAF Gold Cup
- Brazil at the Copa América
- Brazil at the FIFA Confederations Cup
- South American nations at the FIFA World Cup
