= Andrea Staffolani =

Italian footballer (born 1983)

Personal information
- Date of birth: 19 February 1983 (age 43)
- Place of birth: Osimo, Italy
- Height: 1.83 m (6 ft 0 in)
- Position: Forward

Youth career
- Ancona

Senior career*
Years	Team	Apps	(Gls)
2000–2001	Ancona	4	(2)
2001–2004	Parma	0	(0)
2001–2002	→ Ancona (loan)	7	(0)
2001–2002	→ Taranto (loan)	8	(0)
2002–2004	→ Vis Pesaro (loan)	40	(5)
2004–2006	Fermana	57	(8)
2006–2009	Ancona	34	(2)
2008	→ Sangiovannese (loan)	12	(3)
2009	Gela	8	(0)
2009–2010	Poggibonsi	31	(13)
2010–2012	Giacomense	60	(19)
2012–2014	Matelica	20	(2)
2014	Castelfidardo	7	(0)
2014–2015	Atletico Alma MC		
2015–2021	APD Passatempese 1968		
2021–2022	US Filottranese 1922		
2022–2023	ASD Promos 2021		
2023–2024	ASD Leonessa Montoro Calcio		
Total		288	(54)
- * Club domestic league appearances and goals

Andrea Staffolani (born 19 February 1983) is an Italian former footballer who plays as a forward.

== Career ==
=== Ancona ===
Born in Osimo, the province of Ancona, Marche, Staffolani started his career at Ancona.

=== Parma ===
In 2001, he was signed by Parma in co-ownership deal for 1.5 billion lire along with Paolo Guastalvino for undisclosed fee (Parma-Vicenza joint-contract). He was loaned back to Ancona for 2001–02 Serie B. In January 2002 he was signed by Taranto for the rest of 2001–02 Serie C1. In June 2002 the co-ownership was renewed but later terminated during the season. Ancona acquired Giampiero Maini in July 2002 and Daniele Degano in co-ownership deal in August 2002 from Parma for undisclosed fees. Staffolani spent another 2 seasons on loan to Serie C1 for Vis Pesaro.

=== Fermana ===
In 2004, he was transferred to Fermana. He was released in July 2006 after the bankruptcy of the club.

=== Ancona return ===
In 2006, he returned to Ancona, new ran by Ancona SpA to replace the previous folded entity. In the second half of 2007–08 Serie C1, he was loaned to Sangiovannese. That season Ancona and Sangiovannese was promoted to Serie B and relegated to 2008–09 Lega Pro Seconda Divisione respectively from Serie C1 group B. Staffolani's loan contract was expired on 30 June 2008. He returned to Ancona and was awarded no.23 shirt for the Serie B campaign. In January 2009 he was transferred to Gela of the fourth division.

=== Lega Pro clubs ===
In 2009, he joined Poggibonsi of the fourth division. He finally able to score a double figure in a season. In 2010, he moved to fellow fourth division club Giacomense. In the first season he added 5 goals into his accounts and another 14 goals in 2011–12 Lega Pro Seconda Divisione.

=== Amateur ===
In October 2012 he joined Matelica of Eccellenza Marche.
