= Brazil at the Copa América =

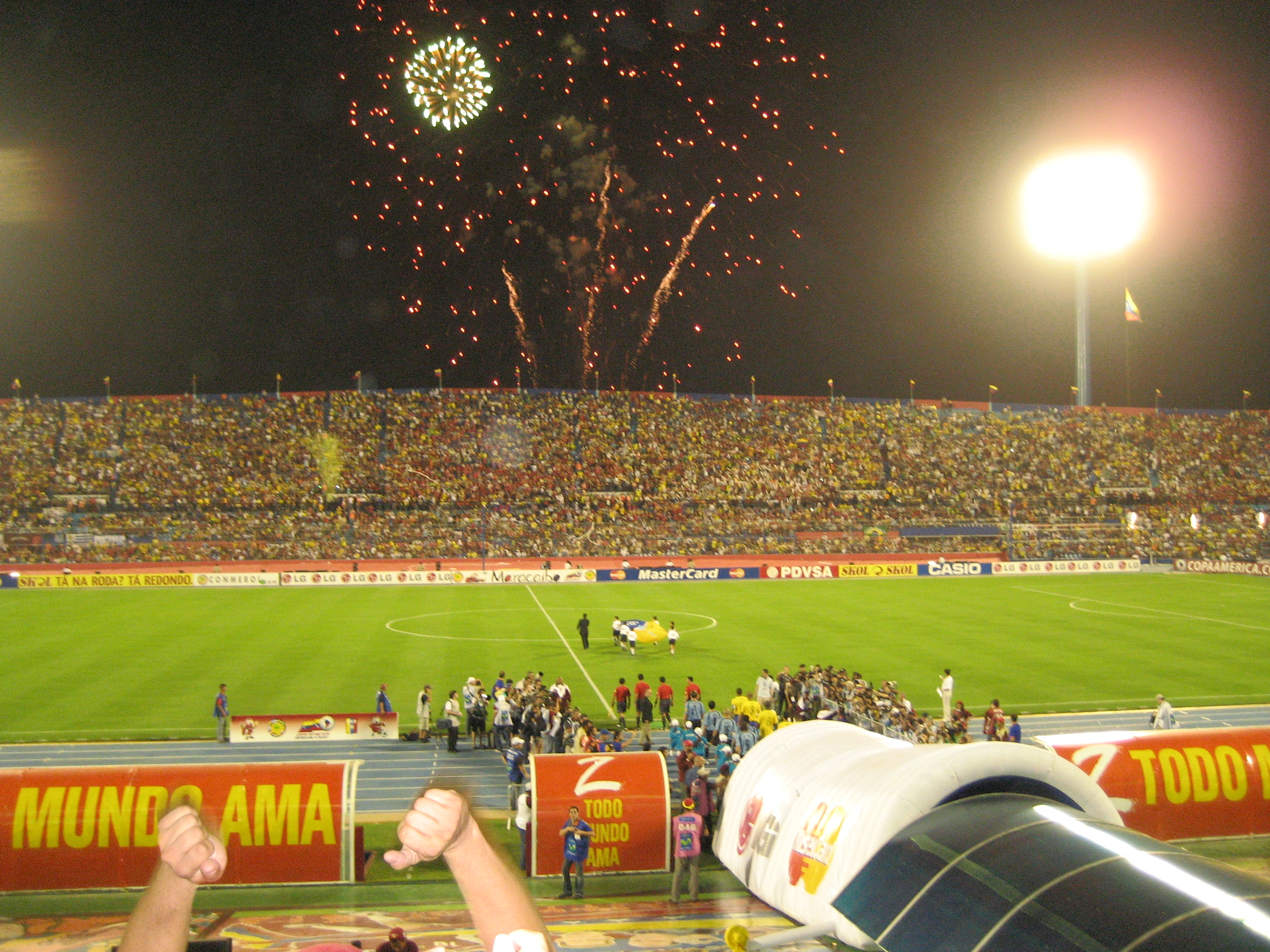
The teams walking out of the tunnel for the 2007 semi-final between Brazil and Uruguay in Maracaibo.

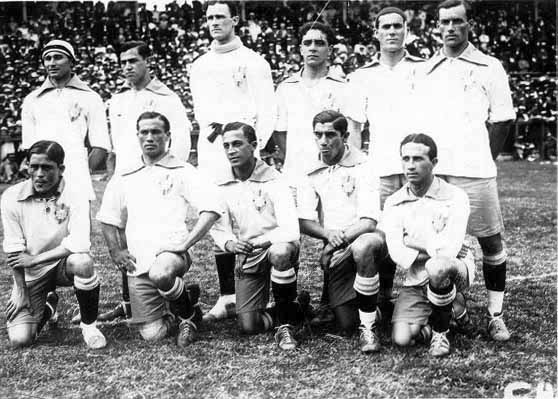
The squad that won Brazil's first international title: the 1919 South American Championship. The final play-off against Uruguay finished 0–0 after regulation, before star player Arthur Friedenreich (kneeling, middle), scored the decisive winning goal in extra time.

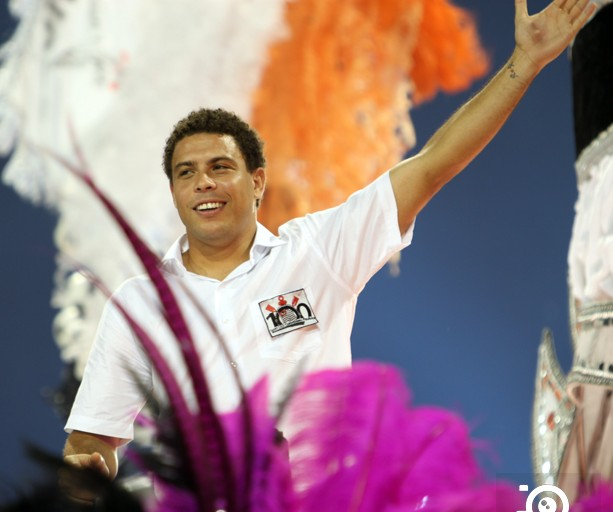
Ronaldo was named player of the tournament in 1997 and its top scorer in 1999. He scored in the finals of both editions.

The Copa América is South America's major tournament in senior men's football and determines the continental champion. Until 1967, the tournament was known as South American Championship. It is the oldest continental championship in the world with its first edition held in 1916.

Brazil have won the tournament nine times, which makes them the third-most successful team in tournament history behind Argentina (16) and Uruguay (15). Brazil withdrew from the tournament for almost ten years between 1926 and 1935.

Brazil were particularly successful from 1997 to 2007, winning four out of five Copas during that time. Zizinho, who competed in the 1940s and 1950s, is the player with the joint-most goals (17) in tournament history.

Pelé, the "Player of the Century", never won the continental title and only competed in one South American Championship in 1959. However, he did present his impressive scoring abilities with eight goals in six matches, becoming that edition's top scorer and most valuable player.

== Overall record ==
South American Championship / Copa América record
Year	Round	Position	Pld	W	D*	L	GF	GA	Squad
(Argentina) 1916	Third place	3rd	3	0	2	1	3	4	Squad
(Uruguay) 1917	Third place	3rd	3	1	0	2	7	8	Squad
(Brazil) 1919	Champions	1st	4	3	1	0	12	3	Squad
(Chile) 1920	Third place	3rd	3	1	0	2	1	8	Squad
(Argentina) 1921	Runners-up	2nd	3	1	0	2	4	3	Squad
(Brazil) 1922	Champions	1st	5	2	3	0	7	2	Squad
(Uruguay) 1923	Fourth place	4th	3	0	0	3	2	5	Squad
(Uruguay) 1924	Withdrew								
(Argentina) 1925	Runners-up	2nd	4	2	1	1	11	9	Squad
(Chile) 1926	Withdrew								
(Peru) 1927	Withdrew								
(Argentina) 1929	Withdrew								
(Peru) 1935	Withdrew								
(Argentina) 1937	Runners-up	2nd	6	4	0	2	17	11	Squad
(Peru) 1939	Withdrew								
(Chile) 1941	Withdrew								
(Uruguay) 1942	Third place	3rd	6	3	1	2	15	7	Squad
(Chile) 1945	Runners-up	2nd	6	5	0	1	19	5	Squad
(Argentina) 1946	Runners-up	2nd	5	3	1	1	13	7	Squad
(Ecuador) 1947	Withdrew								
(Brazil) 1949	Champions	1st	8	7	0	1	46	7	Squad
(Peru) 1953	Runners-up	2nd	7	4	0	3	17	9	Squad
(Chile) 1955	Withdrew								
(Uruguay) 1956	Fourth place	4th	5	2	2	1	4	5	Squad
(Peru) 1957	Runners-up	2nd	6	4	0	2	23	9	Squad
(Argentina) 1959	Runners-up	2nd	6	4	2	0	17	7	Squad
(Ecuador) 1959	Third place	3rd	4	2	0	2	7	10	Squad
(Bolivia) 1963	Fourth place	4th	6	2	1	3	12	13	Squad
(Uruguay) 1967	Withdrew								
1975	Third place	3rd	6	5	0	1	16	4	Squad
1979	Third place	3rd	6	2	2	2	10	9	Squad
1983	Runners-up	2nd	8	2	4	2	8	5	Squad
(Argentina) 1987	Group stage	5th	2	1	0	1	5	4	Squad
(Brazil) 1989	Champions	1st	7	5	2	0	11	1	Squad
(Chile) 1991	Runners-up	2nd	7	4	1	2	12	8	Squad
(Ecuador) 1993	Quarter-finals	5th	4	1	2	1	6	4	Squad
(Uruguay) 1995	Runners-up	2nd	6	4	2	0	10	3	Squad
(Bolivia) 1997	Champions	1st	6	6	0	0	22	3	Squad
(Paraguay) 1999	Champions	1st	6	6	0	0	17	2	Squad
(Colombia) 2001	Quarter-finals	6th	4	2	0	2	5	4	Squad
(Peru) 2004	Champions	1st	6	3	2	1	13	6	Squad
(Venezuela) 2007	Champions	1st	6	4	1	1	15	5	Squad
(Argentina) 2011	Quarter-finals	8th	4	1	3	0	6	4	Squad
(Chile) 2015	Quarter-finals	5th	4	2	1	1	5	4	Squad
(United States) 2016	Group stage	9th	3	1	1	1	7	2	Squad
(Brazil) 2019	Champions	1st	6	4	2	0	13	1	Squad
(Brazil) 2021	Runners-up	2nd	7	5	1	1	12	3	Squad
(United States) 2024	Quarter-finals	6th	4	1	3	0	5	2	Squad
Total	9 Titles	38/48	195	109	41	45	435	206	—

== Decisive matches and finals ==
In the era of the South American Championship, Round Robins were more commonly played than knock-out tournaments. Listed are the decisive matches which secured Brazil the respective titles.

Year	Match type	Opponent	Result	Manager	Brazil scorer(s)	Final location
(Brazil) 1919	Final (Play-off)	Uruguay	1–0 (a.e.t.)	(Brazil) Haroldo Domingues	A. Friedenreich	Rio de Janeiro
(Brazil) 1922	Final (Play-off)	Paraguay	3–0	(Brazil) Laís	Neco, Formiga (2)	Rio de Janeiro
(Brazil) 1949	Final (Play-off)	Paraguay	7–0	(Brazil) Flávio Costa	Ademir (3), Tesourinha (2), Jair (2)	Rio de Janeiro
(Brazil) 1989	Final Round Robin	Uruguay	1–0	(Brazil) Sebastião Lazaroni	Romário	Rio de Janeiro
(Bolivia) 1997	Final	Bolivia	3–1	(Brazil) Mário Zagallo	Edmundo, Ronaldo, Zé Roberto	La Paz
(Paraguay) 1999	Final	Uruguay	3–0	(Brazil) Vanderlei Luxemburgo	Rivaldo (2), Ronaldo	Asunción
(Peru) 2004	Final	Argentina	2–2 (4–2 p)	(Brazil) Carlos Alberto Parreira	Luisão, Adriano (decisive penalty: Juan)	Lima
(Venezuela) 2007	Final	Argentina	3–0	(Brazil) Dunga	Júlio Baptista, R. Ayala (o.g.), Dani Alves	Maracaibo
(Brazil) 2019	Final	Peru	3–1	(Brazil) Tite	Everton, Gabriel Jesus, Richarlison (p)	Rio de Janeiro

== Record by opponent ==
Brazil's biggest victories at continental championships were a 10–1 win against Bolivia in 1949 and a 9–0 win against Colombia in 1957, with Evaristo scoring five goals. Their largest defeat was a 0–6 loss against Uruguay in 1920.

Copa América matches (by team)
Opponent	W	D	L	Pld	GF	GA
Argentina	10	8	16	34	40	53
Bolivia	9	0	2	11	42	13
Chile	17	2	3	22	61	25
Colombia	8	2	2	12	32	6
Costa Rica	2	1	0	3	9	1
Ecuador	12	3	0	15	53	12
Haiti	1	0	0	1	7	1
Honduras	0	0	1	1	0	2
Mexico	4	0	2	6	11	6
Paraguay	13	11	7	31	62	31
Peru	15	3	3	21	47	14
United States	1	0	0	1	1	0
Uruguay	9	9	9	27	37	40
Venezuela	7	2	0	9	30	2
Total	108	41	45	194	432	206

== Record players ==
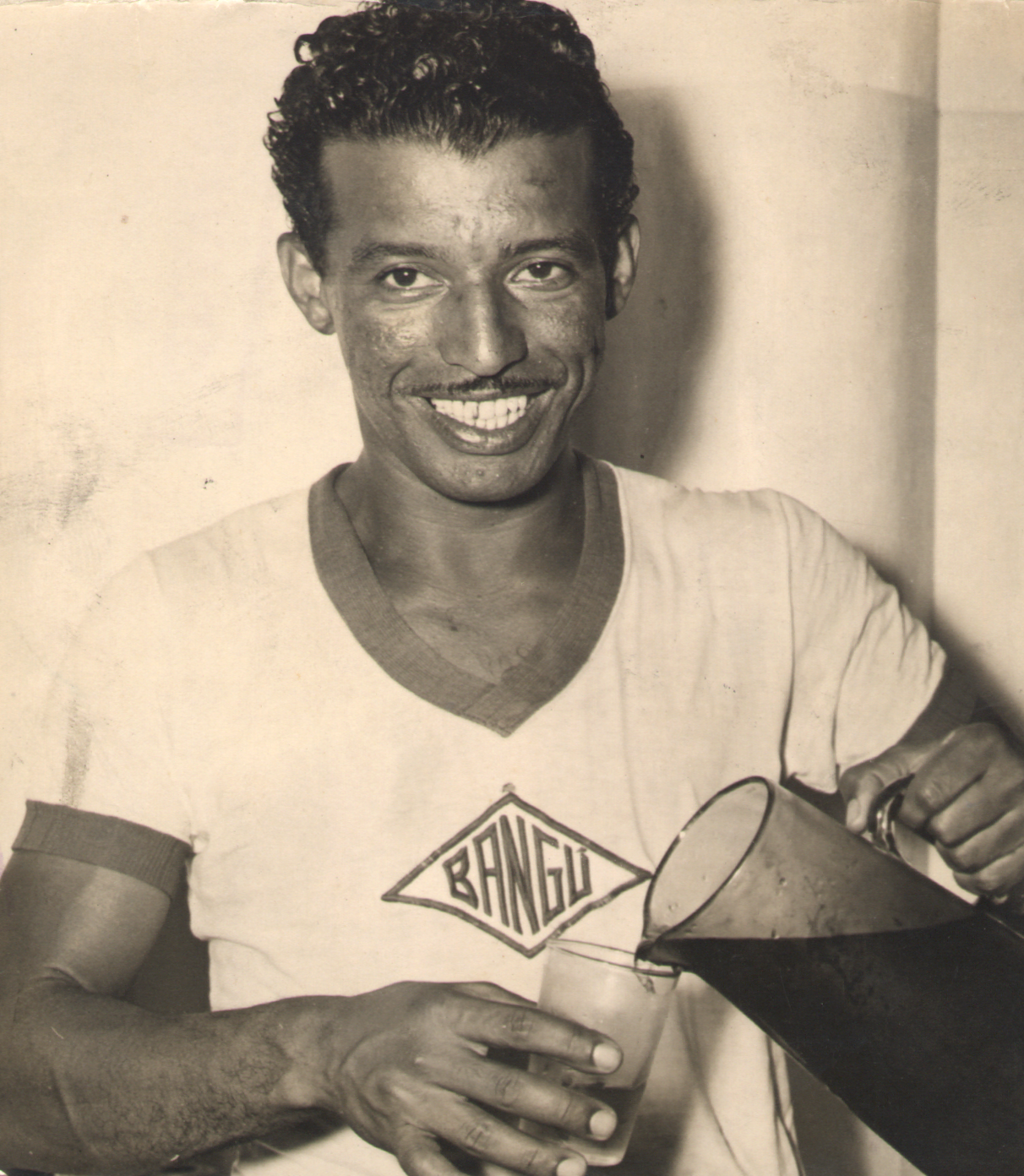
With 17 goals in 33 matches, Zizinho is both Brazil's all-time record player and most successful scorer at the tournament. He won the title once, in 1949.

Rank	Player	Matches	Tournaments
1	Zizinho	33	1942, 1945, 1946, 1949, 1953 and 1957
2	Claudio Taffarel	25	1989, 1991, 1993, 1995 and 1997
3	Djalma Santos	22	1953, 1956, 1957 and 1959 (Argentina)
4	Roberto Carlos	21	1993, 1995, 1997 and 1999
5	Dani Alves	19	2007, 2011, 2015, 2016 and 2019
5	Marquinhos	19	2015, 2016, 2019, 2021 and 2024
7	Jair	18	1945, 1946, 1949 and 1953
7	Aldair	18	1989, 1995 and 1997
7	Dunga	18	1989, 1995 and 1997
7	Thiago Silva	18	2011, 2015, 2019 and 2021

== Top goalscorers ==
Rank	Player	Goals	Tournaments (goals)
1	Zizinho	17	1942 (2), 1945 (2), 1946 (5), 1949 (5), 1953 (1) and 1957 (1)
2	Jair	13	1945 (2), 1946 (2) and 1949 (9)
2	Ademir	13	1945 (5), 1949 (7) and 1953 (1)
4	Didi	11	1957 (8) and 1959 (3)
5	Ronaldo	10	1997 (5) and 1999 (5)
6	Heleno	9	1945 (6) and 1946 (3)
7	Neco	8	1917 (2), 1919 (4) and 1922 (2)
7	Tesourinha	8	1945 (1) and 1949 (7)
7	Evaristo	8	1957
7	Pelé	8	1959 (Argentina)

== Players with multiple titles ==
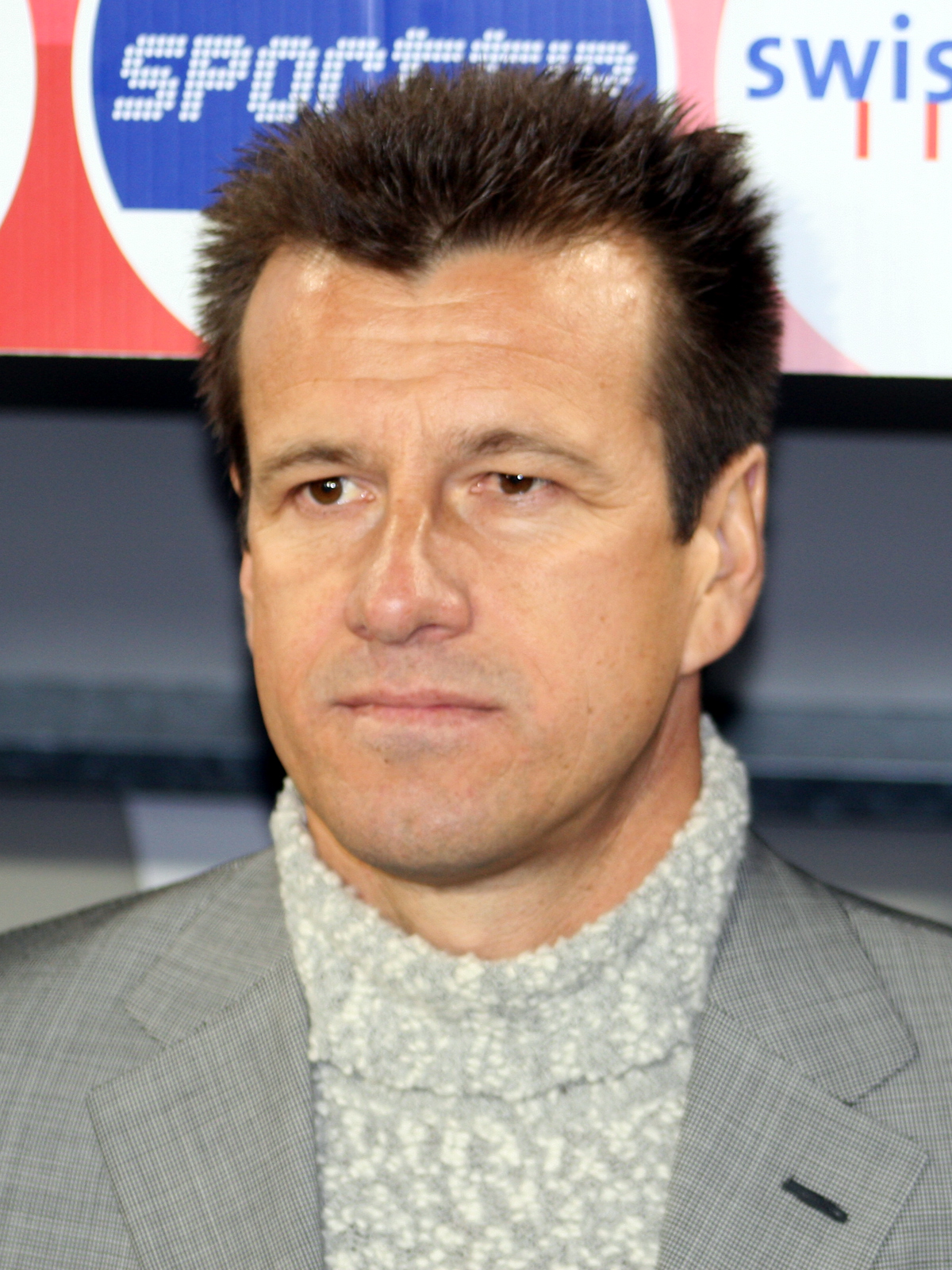
Former defensive midfielder Dunga is the only Brazilian who has won the Copa América three times: Twice as a player (1989 and 1997) and once as head coach (2007).

In spite of Brazil winning four Copa Américas within ten years from 1997 to 2007, no single player has been part of more than two victorious squads. Twenty-three players, however, have won two tournaments each:

Player	Championships
Amílcar	1919 and 1922
Agostinho Fortes	1919 and 1922
Arthur Friedenreich	1919 and 1922
Heitor	1919 and 1922
Marcos	1919 and 1922
Neco	1919 and 1922
Palamone	1919 and 1922
Aldair	1989 and 1997
Dunga*	1989 and 1997
Romário	1989 and 1997
Cláudio Taffarel	1989 and 1997
Cafú	1997 and 1999
Flávio Conceição	1997 and 1999
Roberto Carlos	1997 and 1999
Ronaldo	1997 and 1999
Zé Roberto	1997 and 1999
Alex	1999 and 2004
Diego	2004 and 2007
Juan	2004 and 2007
Júlio Baptista	2004 and 2007
Maicon	2004 and 2007
Vágner Love	2004 and 2007
Dani Alves	2007 and 2019

* Additionally, Dunga won the title as head coach in 2007. Another Brazilian with two titles is Danilo Alvim, who won the South American Championship as player (1949) and as head coach of Bolivia (1963).

== Awards and records ==
Team awards

- Winners (9): 1919, 1922, 1949, 1989, 1997, 1999, 2004, 2007, 2019
- Runners-up (12): 1921, 1925, 1937, 1945, 1946, 1953, 1957, 1959 (Argentina), 1983, 1991, 1995, 2021
- Third place (7): 1916, 1917, 1920, 1942, 1959 (Ecuador), 1975, 1979

Individual awards

- MVP 1919: Arthur Friedenreich
- MVP 1922: Agostinho Fortes
- MVP 1945: Domingos da Guia
- MVP 1949: Ademir
- MVP 1959 (ARG): Pelé
- MVP 1997: Ronaldo
- MVP 1999: Rivaldo
- MVP 2004: Adriano
- MVP 2007: Robinho
- MVP 2019: Dani Alves
- Top scorer 1919: Arthur Friedenreich+Neco (4 goals) (shared)
- Top scorer 1945: Heleno (6 goals) (shared)
- Top scorer 1949: Jair (9 goals)
- Top scorer 1959 (ARG): Pelé (8 goals)
- Top scorer 1983: Roberto Dinamite (3 goals) (shared)
- Top scorer 1989: Bebeto (6 goals)
- Top scorer 1999: Rivaldo + Ronaldo (5 goals) (shared)
- Top scorer 2004: Adriano (7 goals)
- Top scorer 2007: Robinho (6 goals)
- Top scorer 2019: Everton (3 goals) (shared)
- Best goalkeeper 2019: Alisson
- Champion as coach of another nation: Danilo Alvim (with Bolivia 1963)

Team records

- Most goals in one tournament (46, in 1949)
- Victory with highest number of goals conceded (6–4 v Chile in 1937, tied with Chile 5–4 Peru in 1955 and Bolivia 5–4 Brazil in 1963)
- Only team to simultaneously hold the Copa América and the FIFA World Cup title (1997-1998 and 2004–2006. During both spells they additionally won the FIFA Confederations Cup.)

Individual records

- Most goals: Zizinho (17, shared with Norberto Méndez)
- Goals at most different tournaments: Zizinho (6, 1942–1957)
- Most goals in one tournament: Jair (9 in 1949, shared with Javier Ambrois and Humberto Maschio, both in 1957)
- Latest goal: Arthur Friedenreich (122', 1919 v Uruguay)

== See also ==
- Brazil at the CONCACAF Gold Cup
- Brazil at the FIFA Confederations Cup
- Brazil at the FIFA World Cup
