= Diego Daldosso =

Italian footballer (born 1983)

Personal information
- Date of birth: 24 June 1983 (age 43)
- Place of birth: Milan, Italy
- Height: 1.74 m (5 ft 9 in)
- Position: Midfielder

Youth career
- Monza

Senior career*
Years	Team	Apps	(Gls)
2001–2004	Monza	31	(0)
2002–2003	→ Alessandria (loan)	19	(1)
2004–2006	Voghera	41	(8)
2006–2007	Montichiari	18	(1)
2008–2012	Tritium	115	(7)
2012–2014	Sambonifacese	35	(6)
2014	Marano	30	(9)
2014–2015	Altovicentino	24	(4)
2015–2016	Pergolettese	11	(0)
2016–2017	Dro Alto Garda Calcio	29	(0)

International career
2001	Italy U18	0	(0)
- * Club domestic league appearances and goals

Diego Daldosso (or spells as Dal Dosso, born 24 June 1983) is an Italian retired footballer who played as a midfielder.

== Club career ==
=== Monza ===
Born in Milan, Lombardy, Daldosso started his professional career at Lombard side Monza. He played 6 games in 2000–01 Serie B. In June 2001 Daldosso, Daniele Degano, Massimo Ganci and Cristian Maggioni were sold to Parma in a co-ownership deal for 1 billion each (€516,457), which gave Monza a player selling revenue of 8 billion lire (€4,131,655) to boost the financial situation of 2000–01 financial year. Daldosso, Degano, Ganci and Maggioni were also returned to Monza in a temporary deal for the 2001–02 Serie C1 season. As a player eligible to both reserve and first team, Daldosso played 7 times that season. Monza relegated again in May 2002 as the last of group A. In June 2002 Daldosso and Ganci were sold back to Monza for an undisclosed fee; co-currently, Degano and Maggioni were signed by Parma outright for undisclosed fee. However both Daldosso and Ganci left Monza in new temporary deal while Maggioni returned to Monza in temporary deal. Daldosso played 19 games for Alessandria in 2002–03 Serie C2. Alessandria finished last in group A and Monza seventh in the same group. On 1 July 2003 the loan expired and Daldosso returned to Monza. He played one less game comparing to the prior season for Monza, which saw Monza finished eighth of the group. However the club also bankrupted during the season, with the club license being transferred from "Calcio Monza SpA" to new company "AC Monza Brianza 1912 SpA". Under the new ownership, Daldosso was released.

=== Voghera and Montichiari ===
Daldosso joined Serie D club Voghera in 2004 and played for the team in 2 seasons. In 2006, he was signed by Montichiari, returning to professional football after 2 years in non-(fully) professional level. Yet, he played only 18 games for Montichiari. Montichiari relegated back to Serie D in June 2007 after losing the additional "play-out" games.

=== Tritium ===
Daldosso was not part of a club for a season, and in 2008 joined Serie D club Tritium. He won promotion back to Lega Pro Seconda Divisione in 2010, and promoted to 2011–12 Lega Pro Prima Divisione in the next year. He played at least 27 games per season for the Lombard club. He was released again in 2012.

=== Serie D return ===
In 2012, he was signed by Sambonifacese of Serie D.

=== Retirement ===
After two seasons with Peschiera Calcio, where he also had functioned as an athletic coach, 37-year old Daldosso retired in the summer of 2020.

== International career ==
=== Representative teams ===
Daldosso represented Serie C2 group A in 2004 Serie C Quadrangular Tournament. In 2007, he received a call-up to Italy Universiade team for a training match. In that match he was a substitute.

=== Italy youth teams ===
Daldosso also received call-up from the Italy U17 team on 14 June 2001 (after 2001 it was called the Italy U18 team), at that time a feeder team to prepare for the 2001–2002 UEFA European Under-19 Football Championship. However, he did not play that match.

== Honours ==
Tritium

- Serie D (Group B): 2009–10
- Lega Pro Seconda Divisione (Group A): 2010–11
- Supercoppa di Lega di Seconda Divisione: 2011
