= Andrea Dossena =

Italian football manager (born 1981)

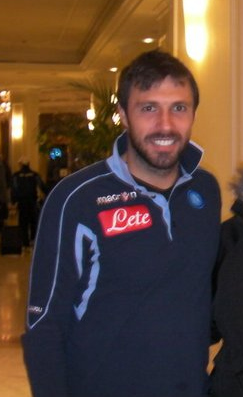
- Dossena with Napoli in 2011

Personal information
- Date of birth: 11 September 1981 (age 45)
- Place of birth: Lodi, Italy
- Height: 1.81 m (5 ft 11 in)
- Positions: Left winger; left back

Youth career
- 1995–2001: Verona

Senior career*
Years	Team	Apps	(Gls)
2001–2005	Verona	99	(3)
2005–2006	Treviso	21	(0)
2006–2008	Udinese	63	(2)
2008–2010	Liverpool	18	(1)
2010–2013	Napoli	83	(3)
2013	→ Palermo (loan)	11	(0)
2013–2014	Sunderland	7	(0)
2014–2015	Leyton Orient	15	(1)
2015–2016	Chiasso	20	(0)
2017	Piacenza	6	(1)
Total		343	(11)

International career
2000–2001	Italy U-20	4	(0)
2007–2009	Italy	10	(0)

Managerial career
- 2019–2021: Crema
- 2021–2022: Ravenna
- 2022–2023: Renate
- 2023–2024: Pro Vercelli
- 2024–2025: SPAL
- * Club domestic league appearances and goals

Andrea Dossena (Italian pronunciation: [anˈdrɛːa dosˈseːna]; born 11 September 1981) is an Italian football coach and former player who played as a left winger or left back.

Dossena started his professional career at Verona in 2001, having progressed through the club's youth ranks. Having made 99 league appearances for Verona, he joined Treviso in 2005, and made 21 league appearances for the club. He then joined Udinese in 2006, and had a successful two-year spell, which, after making 63 league appearances, saw him switch to English side Liverpool in July 2008. However, he struggled to adapt to the English game, making just 18 league appearances in two seasons, and he returned to Italy in January 2010, when he signed for Napoli. Although he quickly established himself in the team, he fell out of favour during the 2012–13 season, and was loaned to Palermo, where he made 11 league appearances. In September 2013, having made 83 league appearances for Napoli, Dossena returned to England when he joined Sunderland. In November 2014, it was announced that Dossena had joined Leyton Orient on a free until the end of the season. He joined Chiasso in 2015. He last played for Piacenza in 2017.

He made his full international debut for Italy in 2007, and was part of their team at the 2009 FIFA Confederations Cup, earning 10 caps in total.

== Club career ==
=== Early career ===
Dossena began his career at Verona as a youth player before playing four seasons in their senior squad. He made his Serie A debut on 18 November 2001 in the city derby against Chievo.

Italian Serie A team Treviso signed Dossena in a co-ownership deal in 2005. It was Treviso's first season in Serie A after they were promoted due to Genoa being denied this privilege as a result of their role in Caso Genoa.

=== Udinese ===
Udinese signed him in 2006 in a co-ownership with Treviso, which became permanent in June 2007. He was given the number 2 jersey and made 63 appearances in the two seasons with Udinese, scoring two league goals there.

In October 2007, he was awarded an improved contract which last until 30 June 2012.

=== Liverpool ===
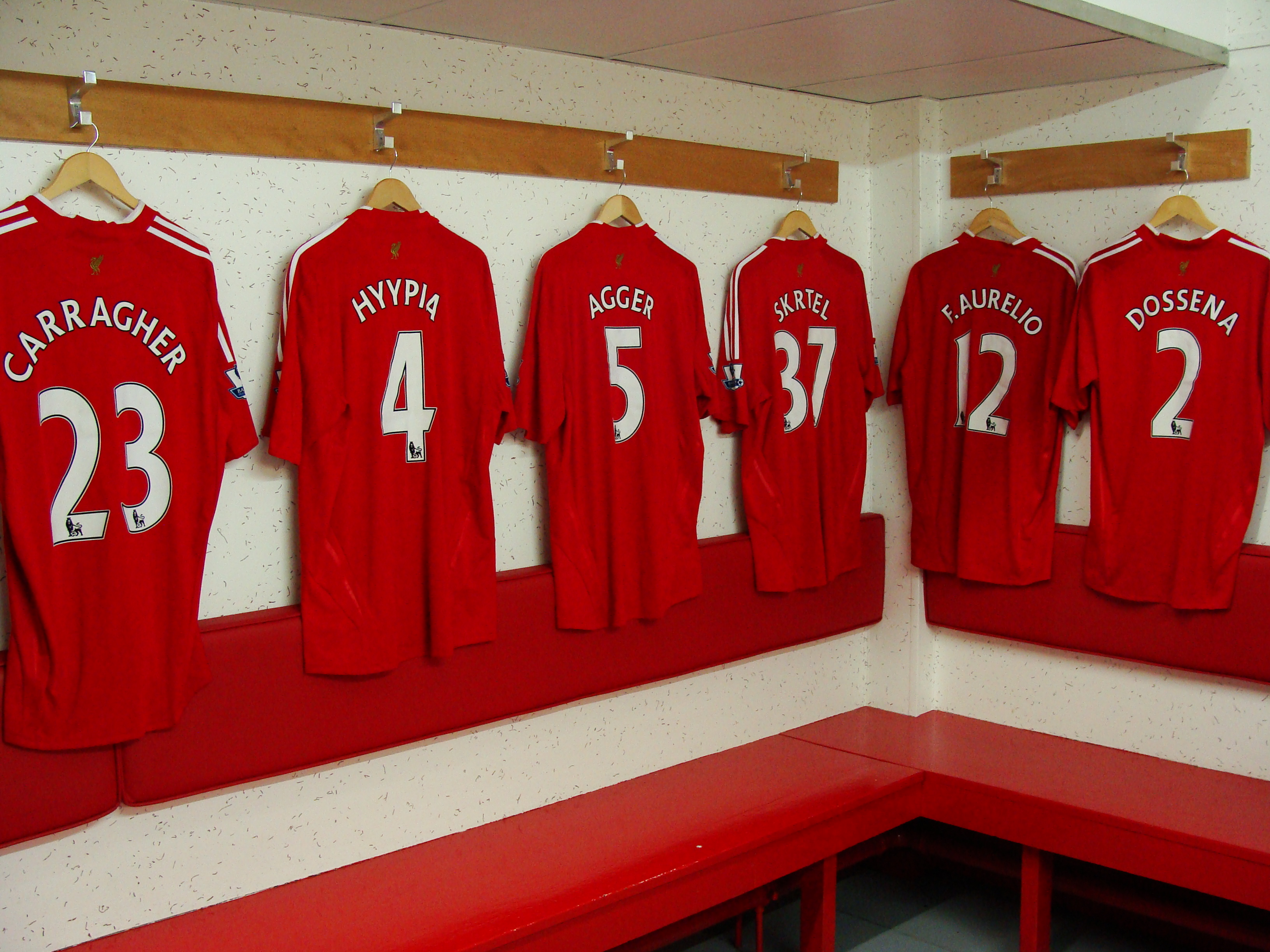
Dossena's No.2 jersey (far right), hanging in the Liverpool changing room, 2009

On 4 July 2008, Liverpool confirmed the signing of Dossena on a four-year deal for an undisclosed fee, reported to be in the region of £7 million, becoming the second Italian to play for the club, after Daniele Padelli.

Dossena was signed as a direct replacement for John Arne Riise who left for Roma. On 10 July 2008, it was announced that Dossena would wear the number 2 shirt. His debut for Liverpool came on 16 August in the 1–0 Premier League win over Sunderland at the Stadium of Light. The start to his career at Liverpool was marked by poor form and he was unsatisfied with his performances, telling The Guardian:

"I am not fully happy with my level. I must now get to a high level and maintain that, but first I have to battle to win selection. I am learning all the time".

Dossena reinforced that he was committed to the club and explained that he was having difficulties adjusting because the pace of English football was significantly different from what he had experienced in Serie A. Despite his largely unimpressive performances, he received more opportunities to prove himself in the first team as Fábio Aurélio, Liverpool's favoured left back, suffered an injury in late November. He lost his first team slot with Aurelio's return from injury combined with the emergence of Emiliano Insúa. He scored his first goal for Liverpool on 10 March 2009 against Real Madrid in the UEFA Champions League after coming on as a substitute. He scored his first goal in the Premier League four days later, on 14 March in the 4–1 victory against Manchester United at Old Trafford. He scored both goals playing as an auxiliary left-winger as a late substitute in both games.

=== Napoli ===
On 8 January 2010, Dossena signed for Napoli in a four-year contract, and was given the number eight shirt The fee quoted was €4.25 million and Andriy Voronin left on the same day. He made his debut for Napoli on 13 January 2010 in a Coppa Italia match against Juventus. His Serie A debut for Napoli came on 17 January 2010 in the 0–0 against Palermo at the San Paolo Stadium.

Dossena netted a brace in the final game of the season against Siena on 13 May 2012, sending Napoli to a 2–1 win and guaranteeing Europa League football.

In January 2013, Dossena went on loan to Palermo.

Following the return of Dossena's former Liverpool manager Rafael Benítez to Napoli, Dossena was told he would be allowed to look for a new club.

=== Later years ===
On 2 September 2013, he moved to Sunderland on a free transfer. Dossena made his Sunderland debut on 27 October, playing at left back in a 2–1 victory over local rivals Newcastle United. However, Dossena was sent off in Sunderland's next game at Hull City for a stamp on David Meyler. He was released at the end of the 2013–14 season by Sunderland after losing out on first team action to Marcos Alonso.

On 6 November 2014, it was announced that Dossena would be joining League One team Leyton Orient on a free transfer until the end of the season. He played 15 games for Orient and scored one goal against Oldham Athletic. He was released by the club following their relegation to League Two.

In February 2017, Dossena signed a contract until the end of the 2016–17 season with Piacenza after training with the club. He was released at the end of his contract having made few appearances.

== International career ==
Dossena played for the Italy U-20 team from 2000 to 2001, earning four caps. He made his first appearance for the Italy senior side in a friendly against South Africa on 17 October 2007. Dossena won his second international cap when he came on at half-time during Italy's 2–2 draw with Austria on 20 August 2008. He scored an own goal to put Italy 3–0 down against Brazil in a Confederations Cup match on 21 June 2009, as Italy were eliminated in the first round of the competition.

== Coaching career ==
On 27 November 2019, Dossena was hired as new head coach of Serie D club Crema.

On 15 July 2021, he was hired by Ravenna, freshly relegated into Serie D.

On 13 June 2022, Dossena was unveiled as the new head coach of Serie C club Renate on a one-year deal, with Samuele Olivi as his assistant.

After a lone season at Renate, on 15 June 2023 Dossena was unveiled as the new head coach of fellow Serie C club Pro Vercelli. On 21 June 2024, Dossena departed Pro Vercelli to sign a two-year contract with Serie C club SPAL. After a lacklustre first half of the season, Dossena was dismissed on 3 February 2025.

== Honours ==
Napoli

- Coppa Italia: 2011–12

Sunderland

- Football League Cup runner-up: 2013–14
