= Mário Zagallo =

Brazilian footballer and manager (1931–2024)

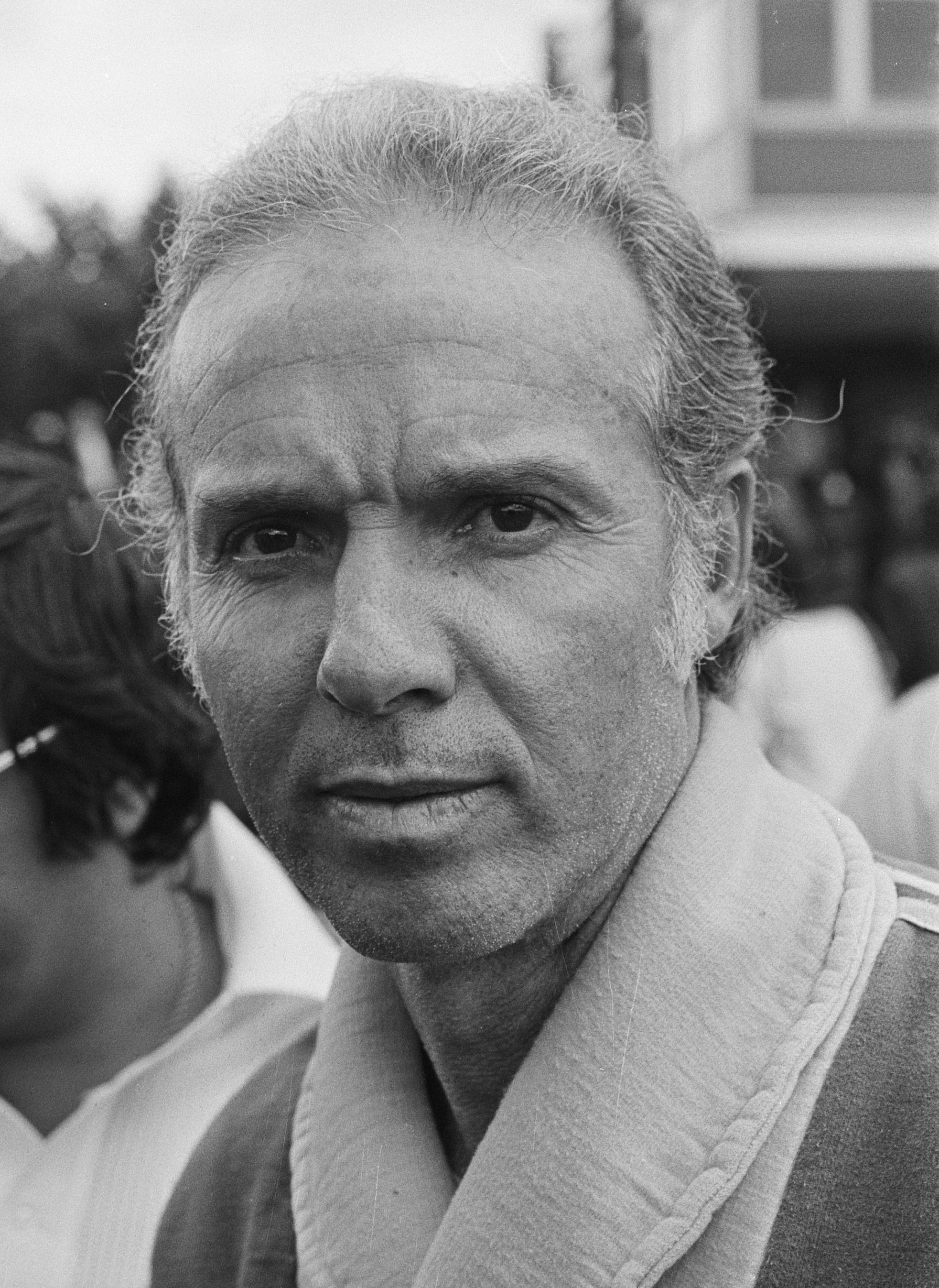
- Zagallo in 1974

Personal information
- Full name: Mário Jorge Lobo Zagallo
- Date of birth: 9 August 1931
- Place of birth: Atalaia, Alagoas, Brazil
- Date of death: 5 January 2024 (aged 92)
- Place of death: Rio de Janeiro, Brazil
- Height: 1.67 m (5 ft 6 in)
- Positions: Inside forward; left winger

Youth career
- 1948–1949: America
- 1950–1951: Flamengo

Senior career*
| Years | Team | Apps | (Gls) |
| 1951–1958 | Flamengo | 205 | (29) |
| 1958–1965 | Botafogo | 300 | (46) |
| Total | | 214 | (57) |

International career
| 1958–1964 | Brazil | 33 | (5) |

Managerial career
- 1966–1970: Botafogo
- 1967–1968: Brazil
- 1970–1974: Brazil
- 1971–1972: Fluminense
- 1972–1974: Flamengo
- 1975: Botafogo
- 1976–1978: Kuwait
- 1978: Botafogo
- 1979: Al-Hilal
- 1980–1981: Vasco da Gama
- 1981–1984: Saudi Arabia
- 1984–1985: Flamengo
- 1986–1987: Botafogo
- 1988–1989: Bangu
- 1989–1990: United Arab Emirates
- 1990–1991: Vasco da Gama
- 1991–1994: Brazil (coordinator)
- 1994–1998: Brazil
- 1999: Portuguesa
- 2000–2001: Flamengo
- 2002: Brazil (caretaker)
- 2003–2006: Brazil (coordinator)
Medal record
Men's football
Representing Brazil (as player)
FIFA World Cup
| Winner | 1958 Sweden |
| Winner | 1962 Chile |
South American Championship
| Runner-up | 1959 Argentina |
Representing Brazil (as coordinator)
FIFA World Cup
| Winner | 1994 USA |
Copa América
| Winner | 2004 Peru |
FIFA Confederations Cup
| Winner | 2005 Germany |
Representing Brazil (as manager)
FIFA World Cup
| Winner | 1970 Mexico |
| Runner-up | 1998 France |
Copa América
| Winner | 1997 Bolivia |
| Runner-up | 1995 Uruguay |
FIFA Confederations Cup
| Winner | 1997 Saudi Arabia |
CONCACAF Gold Cup
| Runner-up | 1996 USA |
| Bronze medal – third place | 1998 USA |
Olympic Games
| Bronze medal – third place | 1996 Atlanta | Team |
Representing Kuwait (as manager)
Arabian Gulf Cup
| Winner | 1976 Qatar |
AFC Asian Cup
| Runner-up | 1976 Iran |
- * Club domestic league appearances and goals

Mário Jorge Lobo Zagallo (Portuguese pronunciation: [ˈmaɾju zaˈɡalu]; 9 August 1931 – 5 January 2024) was a Brazilian professional football player, coordinator and manager, who played as a forward.

Zagallo holds the record for FIFA World Cup titles in general with four titles in total. He also holds the record for World Cup finals with five participations. He was the first person to win the World Cup as both a manager and as a player, winning the competition in 1958 and 1962 as a player and in 1970 as manager. In addition, he won the 1994 FIFA World Cup as assistant manager. Zagallo also coached Brazil in 1974 (finishing fourth) and in 1998 (finishing as runners-up) and was a technical assistant in 2006. He was the first of three men, along with Germany's Franz Beckenbauer and France's Didier Deschamps to have won the World Cup as a player and as a manager, and the only one who had done each more than once.

In 1992, Zagallo received the FIFA Order of Merit, the highest honour awarded by FIFA, for his contributions to football. He was named the ninth greatest manager of all time by World Soccer Magazine in 2013. On 5 January 2024, Zagallo died at the age of 92. He was the last surviving Brazilian player who participated in the 1958 World Cup final, and his death left Amarildo as the last surviving Brazilian player of the 1962 final.

== Early life ==
Mário Jorge Lobo Zagallo was born in Atalaia in the state of Alagoas, on 9 August 1931. He was of Lebanese descent, from Zahlé. He later moved to Rio de Janeiro with his family when he was still eight months old.

As a young man, he committed to complete his military service in the Brazilian Army; he was notably deployed at the Maracanã Stadium when Uruguay defeated Brazil in the 1950 World Cup decisive match.

== Playing career ==
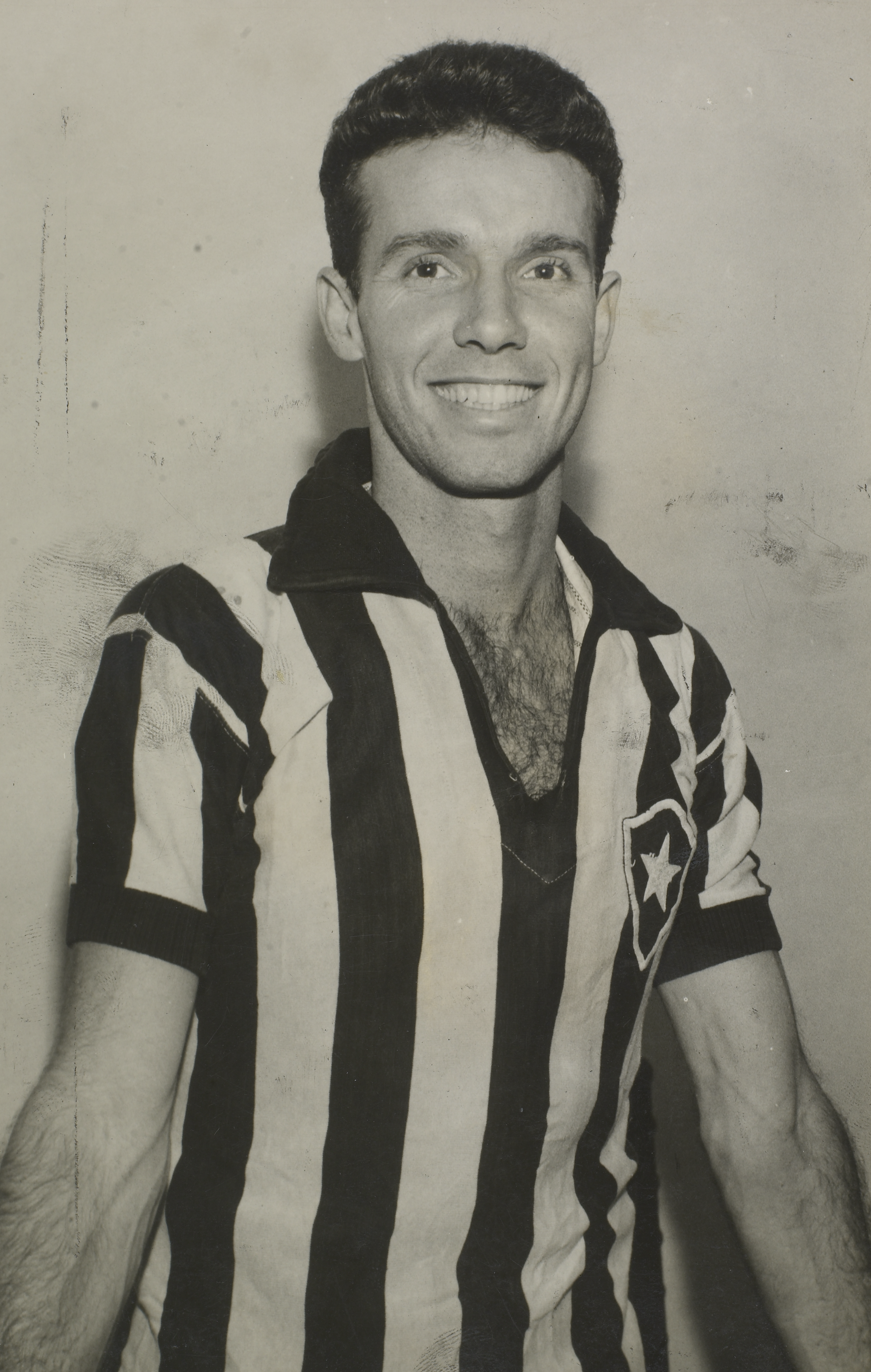
Zagallo during his playing spell at Botafogo

Zagallo started his football career in the youth sector of América, before joining Flamengo in 1950; having turned professional and established himself within the Mengão's first team, he helped the club win three consecutive titles in the Campeonato Carioca between 1953 and 1955.

In 1958, Zagallo joined Botafogo, and eventually became a part of a team that included several other regular starters of the Brazilian national team, such as Garrincha, Nilton Santos and Didi. He went on to help the side win two titles in the Torneio Rio–São Paulo, as well as two in the Campeonato Carioca, and represented O Fogo until his retirement in 1965.

Zagallo won a total of 33 caps for the Brazil senior national team between 1958 and 1964, scoring five goals.

In 1958, he was included by manager Vicente Feola in the Brazilian squad for the FIFA World Cup in Sweden: following an injury to Pepe, he was promoted to the starting XI, and eventually scored a goal in the final as Brazil claimed their first world title.

He was also a part of the squad that won the 1962 FIFA World Cup in Chile, where he started in all of Brazil's matches.

== Profile and style ==
=== Player ===
Zagallo was a diminutive left winger with a small physique, who was known for his technical skills and his high defensive work-rate, as well as his ability to make attacking runs from deeper areas of the pitch. He was also capable of playing as a forward, either as a main striker, or as an inside forward.

Due to his characteristics and his skills, he received the nickname Formiguinha ("Little Ant" in Portuguese).

=== Manager ===
During his first stints as Brazil's head coach in the 1960s and 70s, Zagallo implemented a new system, and mainly adopted a fluid 4–2–3–1 formation. Zagallo was considered to be one of the first managers to focus on the physical preparation of his players before long-lasting tournaments, including the 1970 FIFA World Cup.

Zagallo's fluid 4–2–3–1 formation, which was often seen as a 4–2–4 or false 4–3–3 formation, famously used five number tens in attack and midfield: Pelé, Rivellino, Tostão, Jairzinho, and Gérson, with Gérson dictating play behind the attack, and Pelé and Tostão both also often dropping deep to operate behind the front line, in addition to joining the attack; Tostão's free role with Brazil during the 1970 World Cup under Zagallo, which allowed him to disorient defenders and get onto the end of passes or create space for teammates with his movement and runs off the ball, despite being deployed as a centre-forward on paper, has been likened in the media to the modern false 9 role. The full-backs – Carlos Alberto and Everaldo – would also often join the attack. Clodoaldo instead provided defensive cover in midfield in a holding role. His team placed less emphasis on the defensive aspect of the game than on the attacking side in the latter tournament, and often relied on a high back-line, reverting to a 4–4–1–1 off the ball. The team were known for their exciting attacking play, based on possession, passing, off-the-ball movement, and the technical skills and flair of their players, which became synonymous with the aesthetically pleasing style of play known in Brazilian football as joga bonito; the 1970 World Cup-winning team are considered to be one of the greatest teams of all time. Although he gave his players instructions, Zagallo also gave them a lot of freedom on the pitch, and was known for his leadership and ability to motivate his players and create a united team environment, as well as a winning mentality. The team's fluidity in attack, and the tendency for the forwards to change positions caused problems for Italy in the 1970 World Cup final victory, whose more defensive catenaccio tactics used fixed man-to-man marking.

Considered to be one of the greatest managers of all time, he was nicknamed The Professor by his players throughout his coaching career, due to his tactical awareness and commanding presence on the bench, as well as Velho Lobo ("Old Wolf") due to his surname "Lobo", which means "wolf" in Portuguese. His idiosyncratic personality and patriotism, coupled with his success, also made him a fan favourite.

During his stints as Brazil's head coach during the 1990s, Zagallo instead used a more defensive-minded set-up, following Brazil's success in the 1994 World Cup with a more conservative and pragmatic approach, in contrast to their lack of success in the tournament in the 1980s with a more traditional Brazilian attacking style. At the 1998 World Cup, Zagallo fielded a 4–2–2–2 formation with a double pivot in midfield, occupied by solid defensive midfielders such as Dunga and César Sampaio; the team would become a 4–4–1–1 when defending off the ball. His team made use of ball-playing goalkeepers (such as Taffarel) and defenders (such as Aldair) who would build plays from the back; he also made use of attacking full-backs – Cafu and Roberto Carlos – to contribute to the team's attacking plays. Rivaldo would act as an inverted right-winger, who would cut inside to shoot on goal or create chances for team-mates, while attacking midfielder Leonardo operated on the opposite side. Up-front, Zagallo made use of two strikers, with Bebeto partnering Ronaldo, with the latter being given the freedom to drop deep, link-up with the midfield, and create space for his teammates with his movement, in addition to undertaking attacking runs with the ball. In the 1997 Copa América, Confederations Cup, and Tournoi de France, Brazil were also known for the prolific Ro–Ro attacking partnership of Ronaldo and Romário under Zagallo.

== Managerial career ==
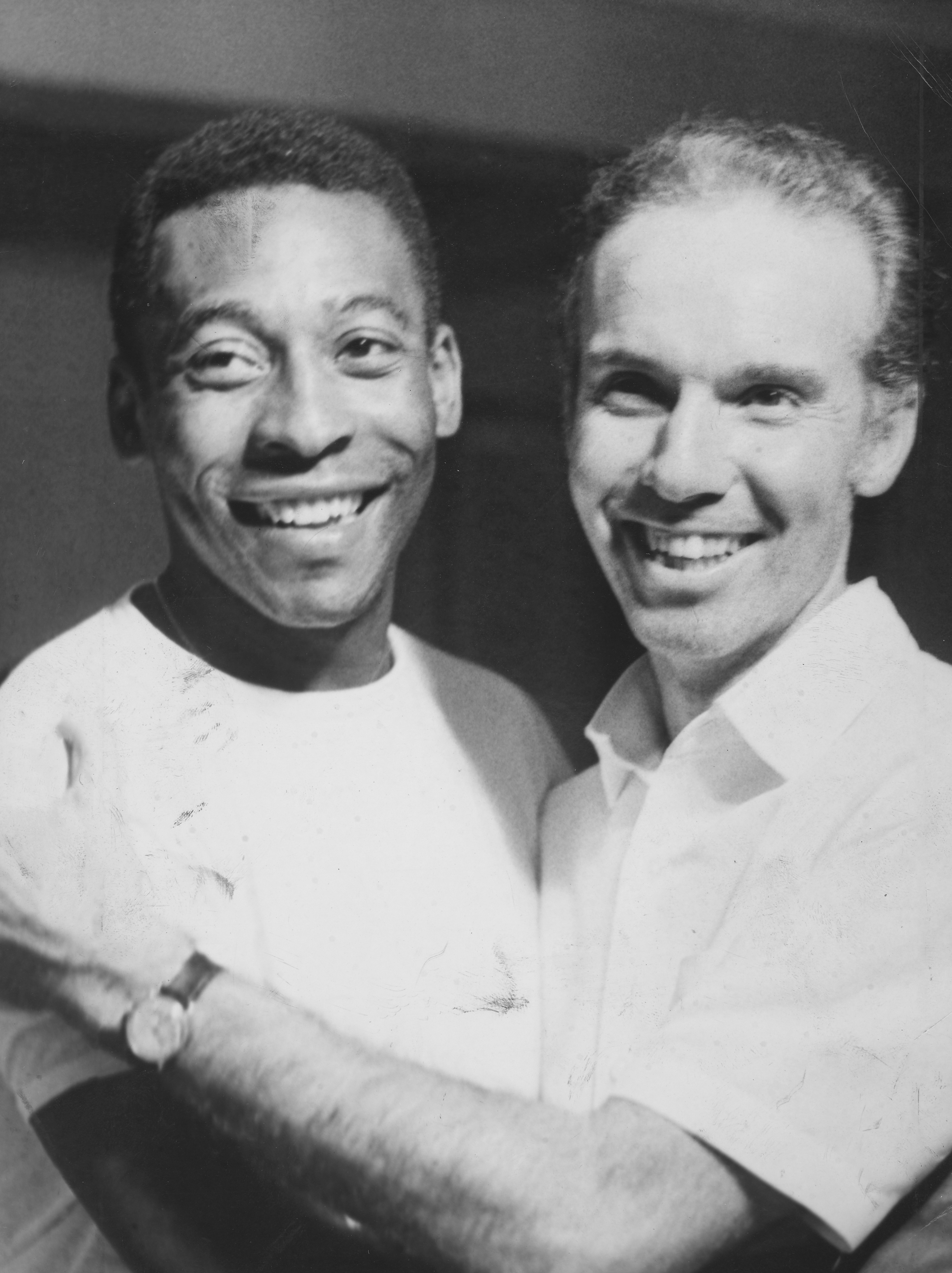
Zagallo with Pelé in 1970

In 1966, Zagallo started his managerial career at Botafogo, the club he had finished his playing career with. He was then appointed as the manager of the Brazil national team shortly before the start of the 1970 FIFA World Cup, and eventually led the Seleção to their third title. In the process, he became the first person to win the World Cup both as a player and as a manager; at the age of 38, he also became the second youngest coach to win the aforementioned title, behind only Alberto Suppici.

At the 1974 FIFA World Cup in West Germany, Zagallo was disadvantaged by the international retirement of Pelé in 1971, as well as injuries to Tostão and Carlos Alberto Torres, meaning that only two starting players from the 1970 final were in the squad. Additionally, the team had a lack of competitive practice due to the shelving of the Copa América between 1967 and 1975. In response to Brazil being eliminated by overly physical European sides in 1954 and 1966, Zagallo chose to play in an equally aggressive way. Brazil narrowly made it through the first group stage by one goal in goal difference over Scotland, and missed out on the final after a 2–0 loss to the Netherlands, in which Luís Pereira was sent off for a foul on Johan Neeskens. Poland then defeated Brazil in the third-place playoff.

In 1989, Zagallo was hired by the United Arab Emirates for their qualification campaign for the 1990 FIFA World Cup. He led the amateurs to an unexpected first qualification to the tournament, but left for Vasco da Gama days before the World Cup began and was replaced by Carlos Alberto Parreira.

He then returned to the Brazilian national team as a coordinator and assistant coach, and helped the side win the 1994 FIFA World Cup while serving in those roles.

Following Brazil's World Cup title victory, Zagallo was once again given the opportunity to manage the Brazilian national team. In June 1997, Brazil finished in second place behind England in the friendly 1997 Tournoi de France, a warm-up tournament ahead of the World Cup the following year. Although the Brazilian team were not favourites to win the 1997 Copa América later that month, they ended up lifting the title, defeating hosts Bolivia 3–1 in the final. After the match, Zagallo is remembered for his emotional outburst into the television cameras, his face red as a result of the altitude in La Paz, stating: "You're going to have to put up with me!" Later that year he also won the Confederations Cup with Brazil, defeating Australia 6–0 in the final. At the 1998 FIFA World Cup the following year (Brazil had automatically qualified at the time as the defending champions), Brazil reached the final, but they lost to the host nation France 3–0.

In November 2002, Zagallo came out of retirement to coach Brazil again, following Luiz Felipe Scolari's exit after winning that year's World Cup. On 20 November, in his only game, the team won 3–2 in a friendly away to South Korea.

== Personal life ==
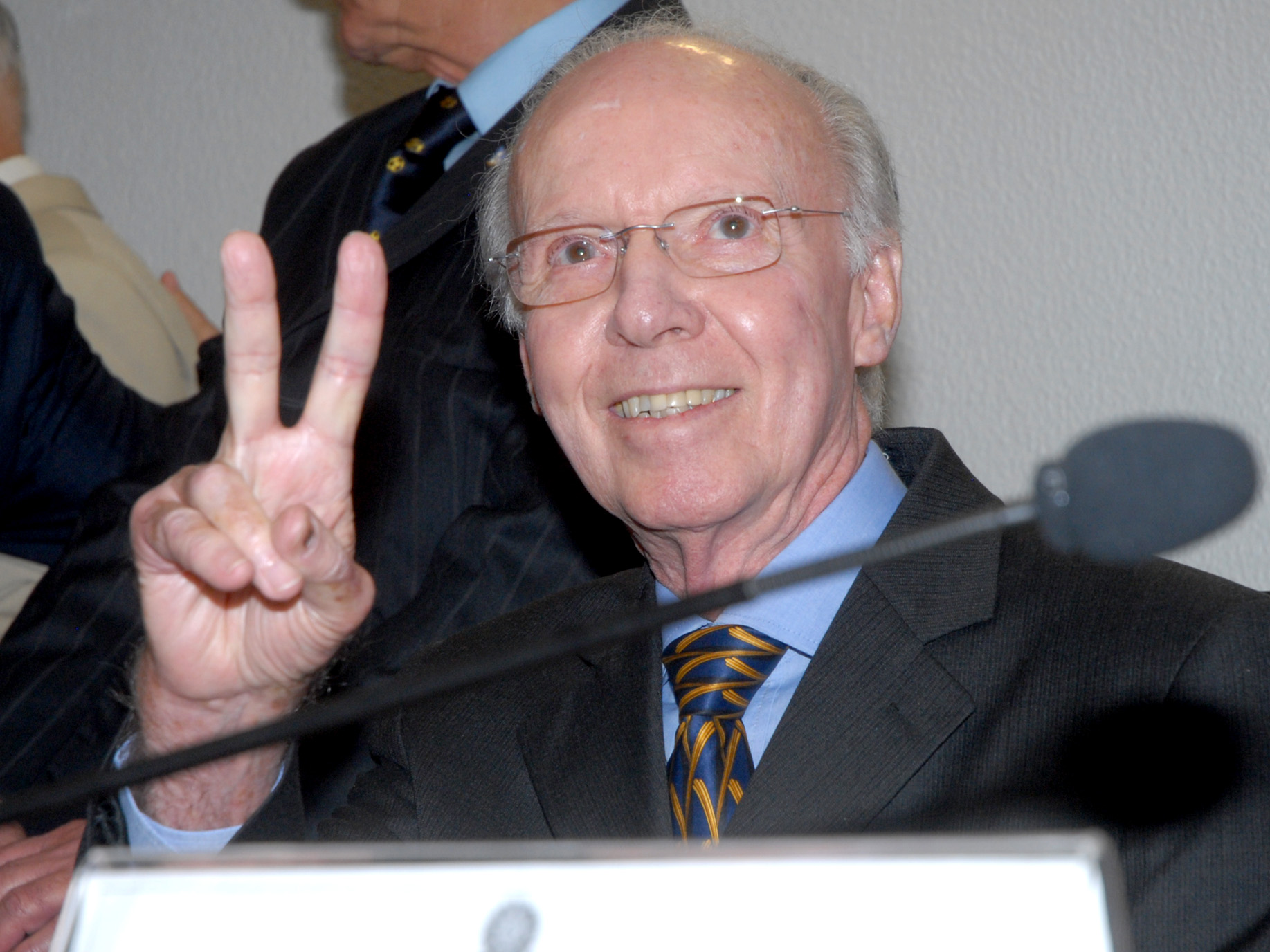
Zagallo in 2008

Zagallo married Alcina de Castro on 13 January 1955 at the Church of Capuchins in Rio de Janeiro. They remained together until de Castro's death on 5 November 2012. Mário and Alcina had four children. He was a practicing Catholic.

Zagallo's surname was spelled Zagalo for most of his career, including by himself, until he told a reporter in the 1990s that his surname on his birth certificate was Zagallo. He was also the only Brazilian World Cup-winning forward to be known by his surname.

In July 2022, Zagallo was admitted to hospital with a respiratory infection. In August 2023, he was hospitalized for 22 days due to a urinary infection. Following a brief hospitalization in Rio de Janeiro, he died on 5 January 2024 due to multiple organ failure, resulting from the exacerbation of various pre-existing comorbidities. Zagallo was aged 92.

== Managerial statistics ==
Managerial record by team and tenure
| Team | From | To | Record | | | | |
| Team | From | To | G | W | D | L | Win % |
|---|---|---|---|---|---|---|---|
| Botafogo | 16 August 1966 | 18 July 1970 | 238 | 85 | 64 | 89 | 35.71 |
| Brazil | 19 September 1967 | 6 July 1974 | 126 | 90 | 26 | 10 | 71.43 |
| Fluminense | 5 September 1971 | 17 March 1972 | 54 | 28 | 16 | 10 | 51.85 |
| Flamengo | 24 June 1972 | 13 November 1974 | 176 | 88 | 39 | 49 | 50.00 |
| Botafogo | 1975 | December 1975 | 21 | 16 | 3 | 2 | 76.19 |
| Kuwait | 5 February 1976 | 23 March 1978 | 31 | 18 | 7 | 6 | 58.06 |
| Botafogo | 14 September 1978 | 31 December 1978 | 29 | 15 | 9 | 5 | 51.72 |
| Al-Hilal | 5 January 1979 | 26 December 1979 | 18 | 12 | 3 | 3 | 66.67 |
| Vasco da Gama | 4 October 1980 | 28 May 1981 | 50 | 26 | 14 | 10 | 52.00 |
| Saudi Arabia | 23 February 1981 | 31 March 1984 | 37 | 16 | 9 | 12 | 43.24 |
| Flamengo | 18 December 1984 | 31 August 1985 | 56 | 28 | 17 | 11 | 50.00 |
| Botafogo | 29 December 1986 | 27 November 1987 | 87 | 27 | 35 | 25 | 31.03 |
| Bangu | 3 November 1988 | 27 June 1989 | 67 | 17 | 30 | 20 | 25.37 |
| United Arab Emirates | 2 September 1989 | 12 June 1990 | 24 | 4 | 13 | 7 | 16.67 |
| Vasco da Gama | 2 October 1990 | 16 May 1991 | 46 | 8 | 29 | 9 | 17.39 |
| Portuguesa | 18 July 1999 | 13 October 2000 | 102 | 39 | 27 | 36 | 38.24 |
| Flamengo | 3 March 2001 | 31 December 2001 | 65 | 32 | 11 | 22 | 49.23 |
| Total | | | 1,239 | 558 | 355 | 326 | 45.04 |

== Honours ==
=== Player ===
Flamengo

- Rio de Janeiro State Championship: 1953, 1954, 1955

Botafogo

- Rio-São Paulo Tournament: 1962, 1964
- Rio de Janeiro State Championship: 1961, 1962

Brazil

- FIFA World Cup: 1958, 1962

=== Manager ===
Botafogo

- Campeonato Brasileiro Série A: 1968
- Rio de Janeiro State Championship: 1967, 1968

Fluminense

- Rio de Janeiro State Championship: 1971

Flamengo

- Copa dos Campeões: 2001
- Rio de Janeiro State Championship: 1972, 2001

Al-Hilal

- Saudi Premier League: 1978–79

Brazil

- FIFA World Cup: 1970; runner-up: 1998
- Copa América: 1997
- FIFA Confederations Cup: 1997

Kuwait

- Gulf Cup: 1976

=== Coordinator ===
Brazil

- FIFA World Cup: 1994

Individual

- IFFHS World's Best National Coach: 1997
- World Soccer Magazine 9th Greatest Manager of All Time: 2013
- FourFourTwo 27th Greatest Manager of All Time: 2020

== See also ==
- List of FIFA World Cup records and statistics in coaching
- National team managers with 100 or more matches
- List of football managers with the most matches
- List of Brazil national football team managers

World Cup-winners status
| Preceded by Hans Schäfer | Oldest Living Player; 7 November 2017 – 5 January 2024 | Succeeded by Dino Sani |
