= List of Brazil national football team managers =

The following is a list of Brazil national football team managers.

== Managers ==
Following is the list with all Brazil national team managers. The list includes unofficial matches:

#	Name	From	To	Pld	W	D	L	Win %	Notes
1	Rubens Salles; Sylvio Lagreca	21 July 1914	27 September 1914	4	3	0	1	75.00	Brazil v Exeter City F.C. (1914), friendly against Argentina (first official match), unofficial friendly against Columbian FC, and the 1914 Copa Roca.
2	Joaquim Ribeiro; Mário Cardim; Montenegro; Sylvio Lagreca	8 July 1916	18 July 1916	4	1	2	1	50.00	1916 South American Championship.
3	Chico Netto	7 January 1917		1	0	1	0	0.00	Unofficial friendly match against Dublin FC.
4	Borgerth; Chico Netto; Cristófaro; Mário Pollo; Teixeira Carvalho	6 May 1917	16 October 1917	6	2	1	3	40.00	1917 South American Championship.
5	Amílcar Barbuy; Ferreira Vianna Netto	27 January 1918		1	0	0	1	0.00	Unofficial friendly match against Dublin FC.
6	Amílcar Barbuy; Arnaldo da Silveira; Ferreira Vianna Netto; Mário Pollo	11 May 1919	1 June 1919	5	3	2	0	60.00	1919 South American Championship.
7	Fortes; Oswaldo Gomes	11 September 1920	25 September 1920	3	1	0	2	33.33	1920 South American Championship.
8	Ferreira Vianna Netto	2 October 1921	23 October 1921	3	1	0	2	33.33	1921 South American Championship.
9	Amílcar Barbuy; Célio de Barros; Ferreira Vianna Netto	17 September 1922	29 October 1922	6	3	3	0	75.00	1922 South American Championship.
10	Clodô	22 October 1922		1	1	0	0	10.00	1922 Copa Roca.
11	Chico Netto	11 November 1923	9 December 1923	7	3	0	4	42.86	1923 South American Championship.
12	Joaquim Guimarães (Uruguay) Ramón Platero	6 December 1925	25 December 1925	6	2	3	1	58.33	1925 South American Championship.
13	Laís	24 June 1928	10 July 1929	4	4	0	0	100.00	
14	Píndaro de Carvalho	14 July 1930	17 August 1930	5	4	0	1	80.00	1930 FIFA World Cup.
15	Luiz Vinhaes	2 July 1931	22 July 1934	15	8	4	3	53.33	1934 FIFA World Cup.
16	Armindo Nobs Ferreira	7 September 1934	24 February 1935	13	12	0	1	92.31	
17	Adhemar Pimenta	27 December 1936	19 June 1938	11	7	1	3	68.18	1937 South American Championship, 1938 FIFA World Cup.
18	Carlos Nascimento	15 January 1939	22 January 1939	2	1	0	1	50.00	
19	Sylvio Lagreca	18 February 1940	25 February 1940	2	0	1	1	25.00	
20	Jayme Barcelos	5 March 1940	31 March 1940	5	1	0	4	30.00	
21	Adhemar Pimenta	14 January 1942	5 February 1942	6	3	1	2	50.00	1942 South American Championship.
22	Flávio Costa (Portugal) Joreca	14 May 1944	17 May 1944	2	2	0	0	100.00	Friendlies matches against Uruguay.
23	Flávio Costa	18 May 1944	16 July 1950	41	26	6	9	72.09	1945 South American Championship, 1946 South American Championship, 1949 South American Championship, 1950 FIFA World Cup.
24	Zezé Moreira	6 April 1952	20 April 1952	5	4	1	0	80.00	1952 Panamerican Championship.
25	Aymoré Moreira	1 March 1953	1 April 1953	7	4	0	3	57.14	1953 South American Championship.
26	Zezé Moreira	28 February 1954	18 September 1955	10	7	2	1	70.00	1954 FIFA World Cup.
27	Vicente Feola	20 September 1955		1	1	0	0	100.00	1955 Copa Bernardo O'Higgins.
28	Flávio Costa	13 November 1955		1	1	0	0	100.00	1955 Taça Oswaldo Cruz.
29	Osvaldo Brandão	17 November 1955	10 February 1956	6	1	3	2	16.67	1956 South American Championship, 1957 South American Championship.
30	Teté	1 March 1956	18 March 1956	5	4	1	0	80.00	1956 Panamerican Championship.
31	Flávio Costa	25 March 1956	8 August 1956	16	10	3	3	62.50	
32	Osvaldo Brandão	13 March 1957	21 April 1957	8	5	1	2	62.50	
33	Sylvio Pirillo	11 June 1957	10 July 1957	4	3	0	1	75.00	
34	Pedrinho	15 September 1957	18 September 1957	2	0	1	1	0.00	1957 Copa Bernardo O'Higgins.
35	Vicente Feola	4 May 1958	12 July 1960	35	28	5	2	80.00	1958 FIFA World Cup, 1959 South American Championship (Argentina).
36	Gentil Cardoso	5 December 1959	27 December 1959	5	3	0	2	60.00	1959 South American Championship (Ecuador).
37	Foguinho	6 March 1960	20 March 1960	6	3	1	2	50.00	1960 Panamerican Championship.
38	Aymoré Moreira	30 April 1961	22 May 1963	40	25	5	10	62.50	1962 FIFA World Cup, 1963 South American Championship.
39	Vicente Feola	30 May 1964	19 July 1966	32	22	6	4	68.75	1966 FIFA World Cup.
40	(Argentina) Filpo Núñez	7 September 1965		1	1	0	0	100.00	SE Palmeiras manager, represented Brazil in a friendly match against Uruguay.
41	Osvaldo Brandão	16 November 1965		1	0	0	1	0.00	SC Corinthians manager, represented Brazil in an unofficial friendly match against Arsenal FC.
42	Aymoré Moreira	21 November 1965		1	1	0	0	100.00	Replaced Vicente Feola in a friendly match against Hungary. Brazil (with Feola) has played against Soviet Union on the same day.
43	Carlos Froner	17 April 1966	20 April 1966	2	1	0	1	50.00	1966 Copa Bernardo O'Higgins.
44	Aymoré Moreira	25 June 1967	1 July 1967	3	0	3	0	0.00	
45	Mário Zagallo	19 September 1967		1	1	0	0	100.00	Rio de Janeiro manager, represented Brazil in a friendly match against Chile.
46	Aymoré Moreira	9 June 1968	17 July 1968	11	8	0	3	72.73	
47	Antoninho	25 July 1968	28 July 1968	2	1	0	1	50.00	1968 Taça Oswaldo Cruz.
48	Mário Zagallo	7 August 1968		1	1	0	0	100.00	Rio de Janeiro manager, represented Brazil in a friendly match against Argentina.
49	Biju; Carlyle Guimarães; Jota Júnior	11 August 1968		1	1	0	0	100.00	Minas Gerais state sports press committee, who represented Brazil in a friendly match against Argentina.
50	Aymoré Moreira	30 October 1968	17 December 1968	6	3	2	1	50.00	
51	Yustrich	17 December 1968		1	1	0	0	100.00	Atlético Mineiro manager, represented Brazil in a friendly match against Yugoslavia.
52	João Saldanha	7 April 1969	8 March 1970	17	14	1	2	82.35	
53	Mário Zagallo	22 March 1970	6 July 1974	62	42	16	4	67.74	1970 FIFA World Cup, 1974 FIFA World Cup.
54	Osvaldo Brandão	31 July 1975	20 February 1977	24	20	3	1	83.33	1975 Copa América.
55	Mário Travaglini (caretaker)	6 October 1976		1	0	0	1	0.00	Unofficial friendly match against CR Flamengo in honor of Geraldo Cleofas.
56	Cláudio Coutinho	3 March 1977	31 October 1979	45	27	15	3	60.00	1978 FIFA World Cup, 1979 Copa América.
57	Telê Santana	2 April 1980	5 July 1982	38	29	6	3	76.31	1982 FIFA World Cup.
58	Carlos Alberto Parreira	28 April 1983	4 November 1983	14	5	7	2	35.71	1983 Copa América.
59	Edu Coimbra	10 June 1984	21 June 1984	3	1	1	1	33.33	
60	Evaristo de Macedo	25 April 1985	21 May 1985	3	3	0	3	50.00	
61	Telê Santana	2 June 1985	21 June 1986	17	11	4	2	64.70	1986 FIFA World Cup.
62	Carlos Alberto Silva	19 May 1987	12 October 1988	20	13	5	2	65.00	1987 Copa América.
63	Sebastião Lazaroni	15 March 1989	24 June 1990	35	21	8	6	60.00	1989 Copa América, 1990 FIFA World Cup.
64	Paulo Roberto Falcão	12 September 1990	21 July 1991	17	6	7	4	35.29	1991 Copa América.
65	Ernesto Paulo (caretaker)	11 September 1991		1	0	0	1	0.00	Friendly match against Wales.
66	Carlos Alberto Parreira	30 October 1991	17 July 1994	47	28	14	5	59.57	1993 Copa América, 1994 FIFA World Cup.
67	Mário Zagallo	13 December 1994	12 July 1998	74	55	13	6	74.32	1995 Copa América, 1996 CONCACAF Gold Cup, 1997 Copa América, 1997 FIFA Confederations Cup, 1998 CONCACAF Gold Cup, 1998 FIFA World Cup.
68	Vanderlei Luxemburgo	23 September 1998	3 September 2000	34	21	8	5	61.76	1999 Copa América, 1999 FIFA Confederations Cup.
69	Candinho (caretaker)	13 November 1999	8 October 2000	2	1	1	0	50.00	Friendly match against Spain and 2002 FIFA World Cup qualification match against Venezuela.
70	Pedro Santilli (caretaker)	15 November 2000		1	1	0	0	100.00	Replaced Emerson Leão in the 2002 FIFA World Cup qualification match against Colombia.
71	Emerson Leão	3 March 2001	9 June 2001	10	3	4	3	30.00	2001 FIFA Confederations Cup.
72	Luiz Felipe Scolari	1 July 2001	21 August 2002	25	19	1	5	76.00	2001 Copa América, 2002 FIFA World Cup.
73	Mário Zagallo	20 November 2002		1	1	0	0	100.00	Zagallo's farewell, celebrated in a friendly match against South Korea.
74	Carlos Alberto Parreira	12 February 2003	1 July 2006	56	31	18	7	55.35	2003 FIFA Confederations Cup, 2004 Copa América, 2005 FIFA Confederations Cup, 2006 FIFA World Cup.
75	Ricardo Gomes	13 July 2003	27 July 2003	5	2	2	1	40.00	U-23 manager, 2003 CONCACAF Gold Cup.
76	Dunga	16 August 2006	2 July 2010	58	40	12	6	68.96	2007 Copa América, 2009 FIFA Confederations Cup, 2010 FIFA World Cup.
77	Jorginho (caretaker)	6 December 2008	26 March 2008	2	2	0	0	100.00	Replaced Dunga in the friendlies matches against Republic of Ireland and Sweden.
78	Mano Menezes	10 August 2010	21 December 2012	33	21	6	6	63.63	2011 Copa América.
79	Luiz Felipe Scolari	6 February 2013	12 July 2014	29	19	6	4	65.51	2013 FIFA Confederations Cup, 2014 FIFA World Cup.
80	Dunga	5 September 2014	12 June 2016	26	18	5	3	69.23	2015 Copa América, 2016 Copa América.
81	Tite	1 September 2016	9 December 2022	81	60	15	6	74.08	2018 FIFA World Cup, 2019 Copa América, 2021 Copa América, 2022 FIFA World Cup.
82	Ramon Menezes (caretaker)	15 February 2023	4 July 2023	3	1	0	2	33.33	U-20 manager. Friendlies against Morocco, Guinea and Senegal.
83	Fernando Diniz (caretaker)	4 July 2023	5 January 2024	6	2	1	3	33.33	
84	Dorival Júnior	10 January 2024	28 March 2025	16	7	7	2	43.75	2024 Copa América.
85	(Italy) Carlo Ancelotti	26 May 2025	Present	22	13	4	5	59.09	2026 FIFA World Cup.

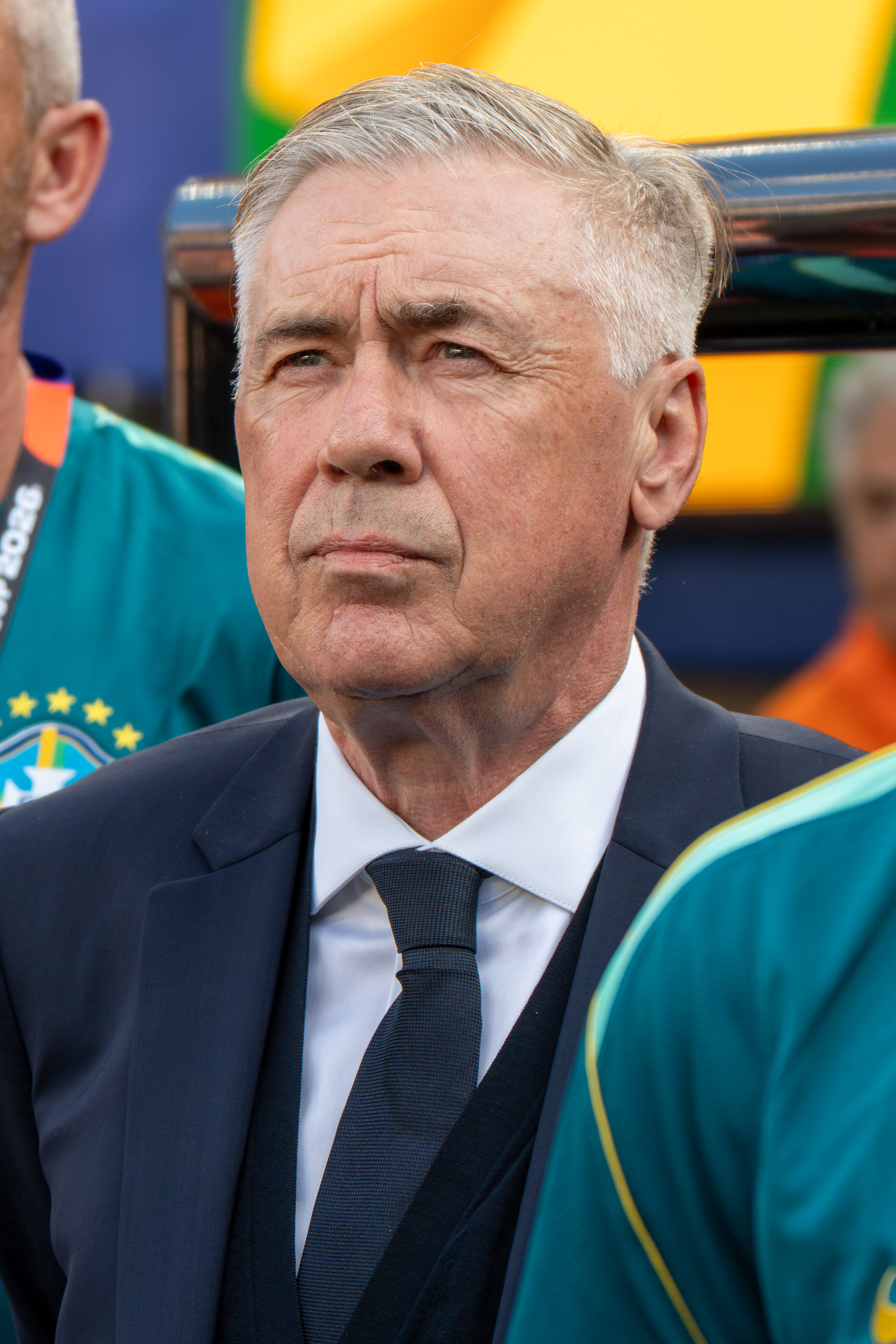
Carlo Ancelotti, current Brazil national football team's manager, fourth non-Brazilian, second European and first Italian

== Records ==
Mário Zagallo became the first person to win the FIFA World Cup both as a player (1958 and 1962) and as a manager (1970).

In 1970, when he was of age 38, he won the FIFA World Cup which made him the second youngest coach to win the FIFA World Cup. While still in Brazil as an assistant coach, the team won the 1994 FIFA World Cup.

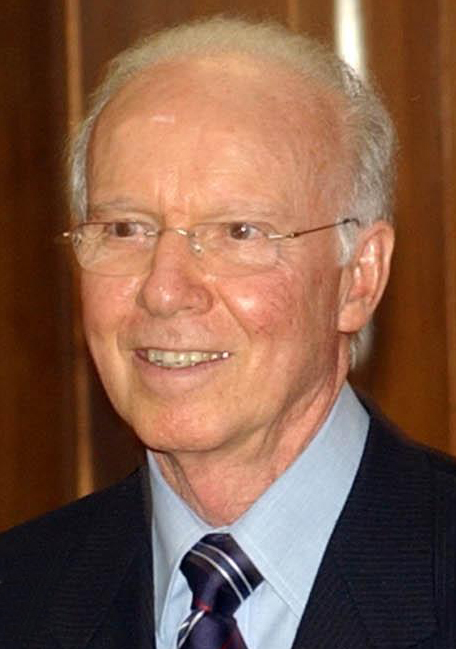
Mário Zagallo

=== Most manager appearances ===
As of 9 December 2022
Includes only official matches. In bold the current manager.

Rank	Manager	Apps	W	D	L	%
1	Mário Zagallo	126	90	26	10	80,31
2	Carlos Alberto Parreira	112	61	37	14	67,87
3	Dunga	83	57	17	9	75,50
4	Tite	81	60	15	6	80,24
5	Aymoré Moreira	63	39	9	16	64,46
6	Vicente Feola	57	41	10	6	80,70
7	Flávio Costa	56	35	9	12	70,54
8	Luiz Felipe Scolari	53	37	7	9	74,21
8	Telê Santana	53	38	10	5	81,13
