= Dunga =

Brazilian football player (born 1963)

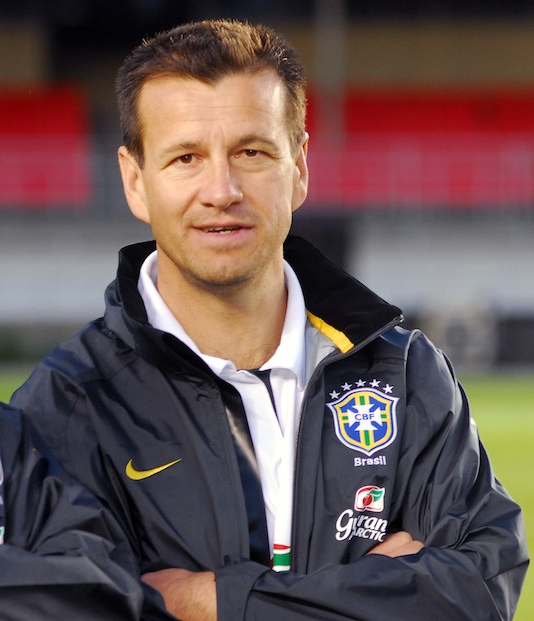
- Dunga with Brazil in 2008

Personal information
- Full name: Carlos Caetano Bledorn Verri
- Date of birth: 31 October 1963 (age 63)
- Place of birth: Ijuí, Rio Grande do Sul, Brazil
- Height: 1.76 m (5 ft 9 in)
- Position: Defensive midfielder

Senior career*
Years	Team	Apps	(Gls)
1980–1984	Internacional	10	(0)
1984–1985	Corinthians	13	(1)
1985–1987	Santos	16	(1)
1987	Vasco da Gama	17	(1)
1987–1988	Pisa	23	(2)
1988–1992	Fiorentina	124	(8)
1992–1993	Pescara	23	(3)
1993–1995	VfB Stuttgart	54	(7)
1995–1998	Júbilo Iwata	99	(16)
1999–2000	Internacional	20	(3)
Total		377	(42)

International career
1983–1986	Brazil Olympic	19	(4)
1987–1998	Brazil	91	(6)

Managerial career
- 2006–2010: Brazil
- 2008: Brazil U23
- 2012–2013: Internacional
- 2014–2016: Brazil
Medal record
Men's football
Representing Brazil (as player)
FIFA World Cup
Winner	1994 USA
Runner-up	1998 France
FIFA Confederations Cup
Winner	1997 Saudi Arabia
Copa América
Winner	1989 Brazil
Winner	1997 Bolivia
Runner-up	1995 Uruguay
Olympic Games
Silver medal – second place	1984 Los Angeles	Team
Pan American Games
Silver medal – second place	1983 Caracas	Team
FIFA U-20 World Cup
Winner	1983 Mexico
South American U-20 Championship
Winner	1983 Bolivia
Representing Brazil (as manager)
FIFA Confederations Cup
Winner	2009 South Africa
Copa América
Winner	2007 Venezuela
Olympic Games
Bronze medal – third place	2008 Beijing	Team
- * Club domestic league appearances and goals

Carlos Caetano Bledorn Verri (born 31 October 1963), commonly known as Dunga (Portuguese pronunciation: [ˈdũɡɐ]), is a Brazilian former football manager and former professional player. Considered one of the greatest defensive midfielders of all time, as a player, he was known for his technique, athleticism, passing range, solid tackles and first touch.

Under the captaincy Dunga took from Raí, Brazil won the 1994 FIFA World Cup and became runners-up of the following edition. He and Xavi are the only two men to have played in a World Cup final, an Olympic final, a Confederations Cup final and a continental championship final.

Dunga coached Brazil in two separate tenures. His first spell gave the Seleção two titles, the 2007 Copa América and the 2009 FIFA Confederations Cup, as well as an Olympic bronze medal at Beijing 2008 before ending in an exit from the 2010 FIFA World Cup quarter-finals. Four years later, in 2014, the Brazilian Football Confederation appointed Dunga again but dismissed him after Brazil's early exit from the Copa América Centenario. He also led Internacional briefly in 2013.

== Early and personal life ==
Dunga was born in Ijuí, Rio Grande do Sul of Italian and German descent. His uncle nicknamed him "Dunga", derived from the Portuguese translation of "Dopey", one of the Seven Dwarfs from Disney's 1937 film Snow White and the Seven Dwarfs, due to his small stature in childhood. It was believed that Dunga would be a short adult and the nickname remained in use even after he grew up and became taller.

=== Financial dispute with QPR ===
Dunga has an ongoing financial dispute with English club Queens Park Rangers. He claims he loaned £750,000 to QPR as an investor in the club when it was under previous owners but the new owners are refusing to give it back. QPR have stated that the cheque Dunga paid to them had bounced and he is aware of this fact.

== Playing career ==
=== Club ===
At club level, Dunga played for Internacional (1980–84, 1999–2000), Corinthians (1984–85), Santos (1985–87), Vasco da Gama (1987), Pisa (1987–88), Fiorentina (1988–92), Pescara (1992–93), VfB Stuttgart (1993–95) and finally Júbilo Iwata (1995–98).

=== International ===
==== Youth levels ====
Dunga's international career began in 1983 at the FIFA U-20 World Cup, where he captained the Brazilian under-20 team to win the tournament after beating Argentina in the final. A year later, he made the 1984 Summer Olympics silver medal-winning Brazil squad, which also had Mauro Galvão and Luiz Carlos Winck among others.

==== Senior ====
Dunga debuted for the Brazilian senior squad during a 1–1 friendly draw against England in 1987. He was part of the national side that won the 1989 Copa América on home soil, by defeating Uruguay 2–0 at the Maracanã Stadium in Rio de Janeiro; he played in six of his country's seven games throughout the tournament.

Dunga was a starter for Brazil at the 1990 FIFA World Cup, during which he was held more responsible than his teammates for the team's worst campaign at a World Cup since 1966, after a lackluster tournament and the squad's subsequent elimination in the second round by archrivals Argentina, drawing criticism from former Brazil international and three–time World Cup winner Pelé. In the following years, Dunga was consistently targeted by Brazilian press due to his supposedly "thuggish" style of playing. This period in Brazil's football history became known as the "Dunga Era" in the media, and symbolized a less-than-thrilling, slow, gritty, direct and defensive style that the Brazil national team had adopted in favour of a more exciting attacking style. Dunga played the anchor role in midfield extremely effectively, due to his ability to break down play and subsequently start attacks with his passing. Many other players in this position lunged into tackles and put themselves about, but Dunga rarely went to ground to make a tackle, instead using his anticipation and timing to win challenges and retrieve the ball. Despite his infamous reputation, Brazil's new coach Carlos Alberto Parreira kept Dunga as one of the starting line-up throughout the 1994 FIFA World Cup qualification and final.

Playmaker Raí initially started the 1994 World Cup in the United States as the Brazilian team's captain, but after allegedly being held responsible for Brazil's poor performances early on in the tournament, he was eventually dropped altogether in favour of Mazinho. Dunga took over the captaincy and went on to lift the trophy. Dunga set-up Romário's opening goal in a 3–0 win over Cameroon in the first round, and scored the third penalty kick in the shoot-out victory against Italy in the final following a goalless draw after extra time. According to FIFA, the lack of attacking play in the final of the tournament against Italy was in part down to strong holding midfield play by Dino Baggio for Italy, as well as Dunga and Mauro Silva for Brazil. Throughout the World Cup, Dunga completed the most passes (692) and tackles (57), both World Cup records. In the aforementioned match against Italy, he also set a record for completing the most passes ever in a World Cup final (130), and is only one of three players ever to have completed over 100 passes in a World Cup final, with the others being Spain's Rodri (101) and Pau Cubarsí (121) in 2026.

Dunga retained the role of the Brazil national team's captain for the next four years until the 1998 FIFA World Cup, in which he participated, despite playing in the Japanese J. League, considered a lower standard of competitive football at the time. He won the 1997 Copa América, scoring his only goal in the competition in a 2–0 win over Colombia in the first round. The 1998 World Cup was notable for the tensions and lack of teamwork within the Brazilian side. It was often visible on the pitch as demonstrated by the fact that Dunga got into a fight with teammate Bebeto in the first round match against Morocco, forcing the rest of the team to break them up. Despite these difficulties, Brazil went on to reach the final of the tournament, where they lost 3–0 to hosts France; this was Dunga's final international appearance. En route to the final, Dunga set-up César Sampaio's first goal in a 4–1 win over Chile in the round of 16, and also recorded an assist on Rivaldo's second goal in a 3–2 win over Denmark in the quarter-finals. Dunga also scored his team's fourth penalty kick in the shootout victory against the Netherlands in the semi-finals.

In total, Dunga made 91 senior-level appearances for Brazil, scoring six goals.

== Management ==
=== Brazil ===
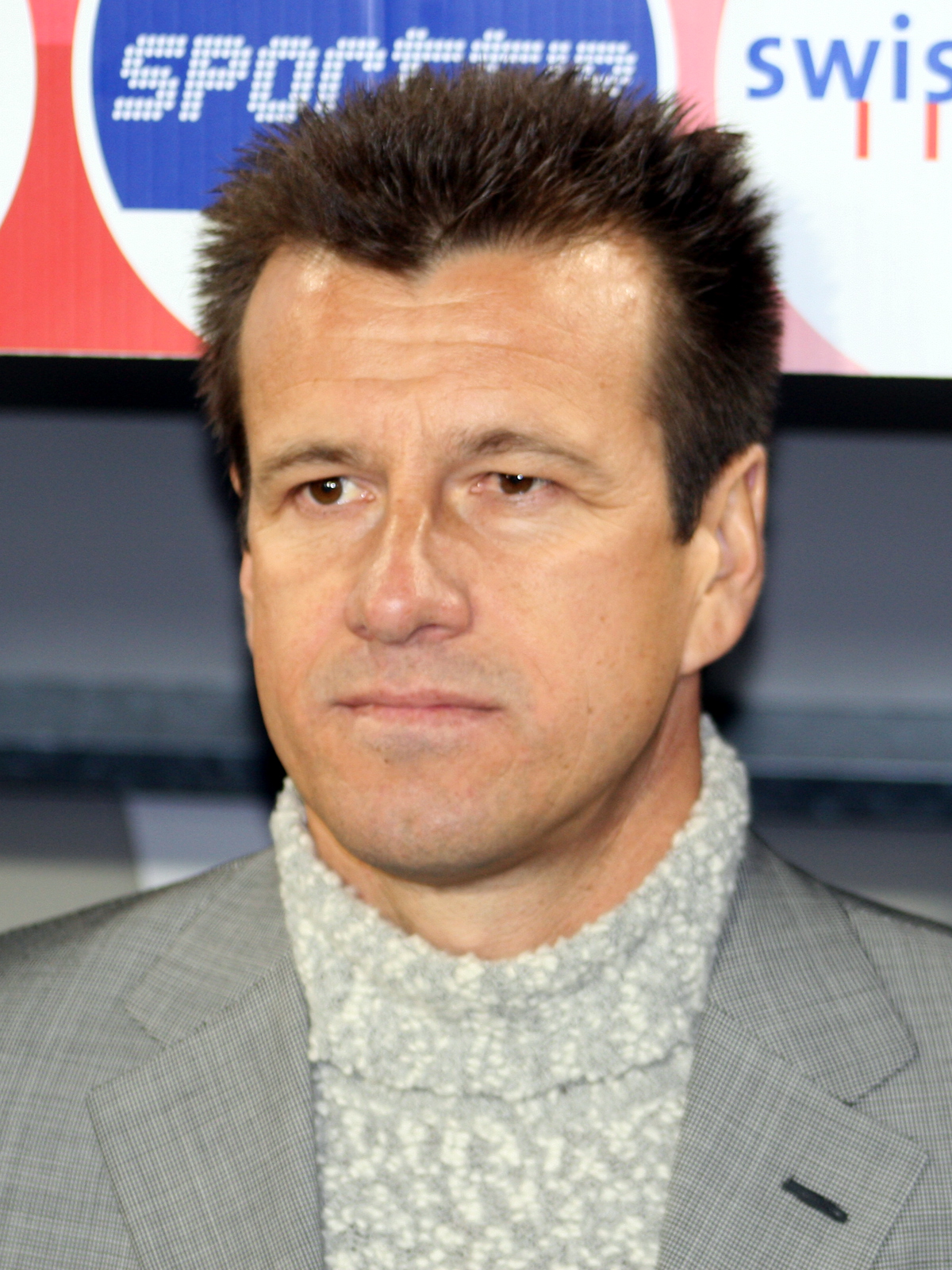
Dunga in 2006

On 24 July 2006, Dunga was named as the new national coach of the Brazil national team as a replacement for Carlos Alberto Parreira, despite the fact that he had no prior coaching experience at the professional level. Pundit Tim Vickery wrote that Parreira was perceived as passive, while Dunga was considered to be passionate and involved like 2002 FIFA World Cup-winning manager Luiz Felipe Scolari; Dunga agreed with the comparison. Alex Bellos wrote that Parreira was blamed for Brazil's 2006 World Cup exit due to deferring to star players, while Dunga was viewed as a tougher presence. It was believed in the Brazilian media believed that Dunga would serve as manager only until Scolari became available.

Dunga's first match in charge was against Norway in Oslo on 16 August 2006, a 1–1 draw. His team lined up without Ronaldo, Ronaldinho or Kaká, and their equaliser was scored by CSKA Moscow's Daniel Carvalho. On 3 September, his team took on arch-rivals Argentina on 3 September at Arsenal's new Emirates Stadium in London, and won 3–0, with two goals by Shakhtar Donetsk midfielder Elano.

Dunga's first competitive games were at the 2007 Copa América in Venezuela. His squad was without Ronaldinho and Kaká who had asked to be excused, or Ronaldo and Adriano who were out of form. Gilberto and Dani Alves were replacements at full-back for the retired Cafu and Roberto Carlos, while Robinho, Vagner Love and Afonso Alves were among the attacking options. The team won their second consecutive continental title by beating Argentina in the final 3–0. Vickery wrote that opposing manager Alfio Basile played a passing game similar to how Brazil had played in the 1980s, but Dunga's Brazil had a physical presence and quick counter-attacking, that was similar to teams that had beaten previous Brazil sides.

Dunga led the Brazil under-23 team at the 2008 Olympic tournament in China, naming Ronaldinho and Thiago Silva as his two overage players after being denied the use of Robinho by Real Madrid. Eliminated by reigning and eventual champions Argentina in the semi-finals, his side took the bronze medal by defeating Belgium 3–0.

Dunga's squad also won the 2009 FIFA Confederations Cup in South Africa on 28 June 2009. The team came back from a 2–0 deficit against the United States, winning with a Lúcio header in the 84th minute that made the score 3–2. His side qualified for the 2010 FIFA World Cup with three games to spare, then lost 2–1 away to Bolivia at high altitude; this ended an 11-game winning streak and 19 games unbeaten. He set up his side around Kaká, who had been played out of position by Parreira, and used Gilberto Silva and Felipe Melo as defensive midfielders, with Luís Fabiano preferred up front. Unlike Parreira, he limited media access to the team and criticised journalists.

Before the World Cup in South Africa, Dunga's tactics were criticised by 1970 FIFA World Cup-winning pair Carlos Alberto and Tostão, who accused his team of not playing in the national style. Public figures including Pelé criticised him for excluding AC Milan attackers Ronaldinho and Alexandre Pato, as well as Santos youngsters Neymar and Ganso. Brazil made it to the quarter-finals, where they lost 2–1 to the Netherlands after having led the game 1–0. After Brazil's exit from the competition, Dunga announced he would stand down as coach, but was first dismissed by CBF on 24 July 2010.

It was announced on 29 August 2011 that Dunga had signed a contract with Qatari club Al-Rayyan as a replacement for Paulo Autuori, but Al Rayyan opted to sign another coach after Dunga stated he was "not sure" about the position.

=== Internacional ===
On 12 December 2012, Dunga was confirmed as new coach of Internacional, where he started and finished his career as a player. On 3 October 2013, he was fired after a series of losses left the gaúcho team in disarray.

Dunga served as a commentator for IRIB during the 2014 World Cup.

=== Second stint with Brazil ===
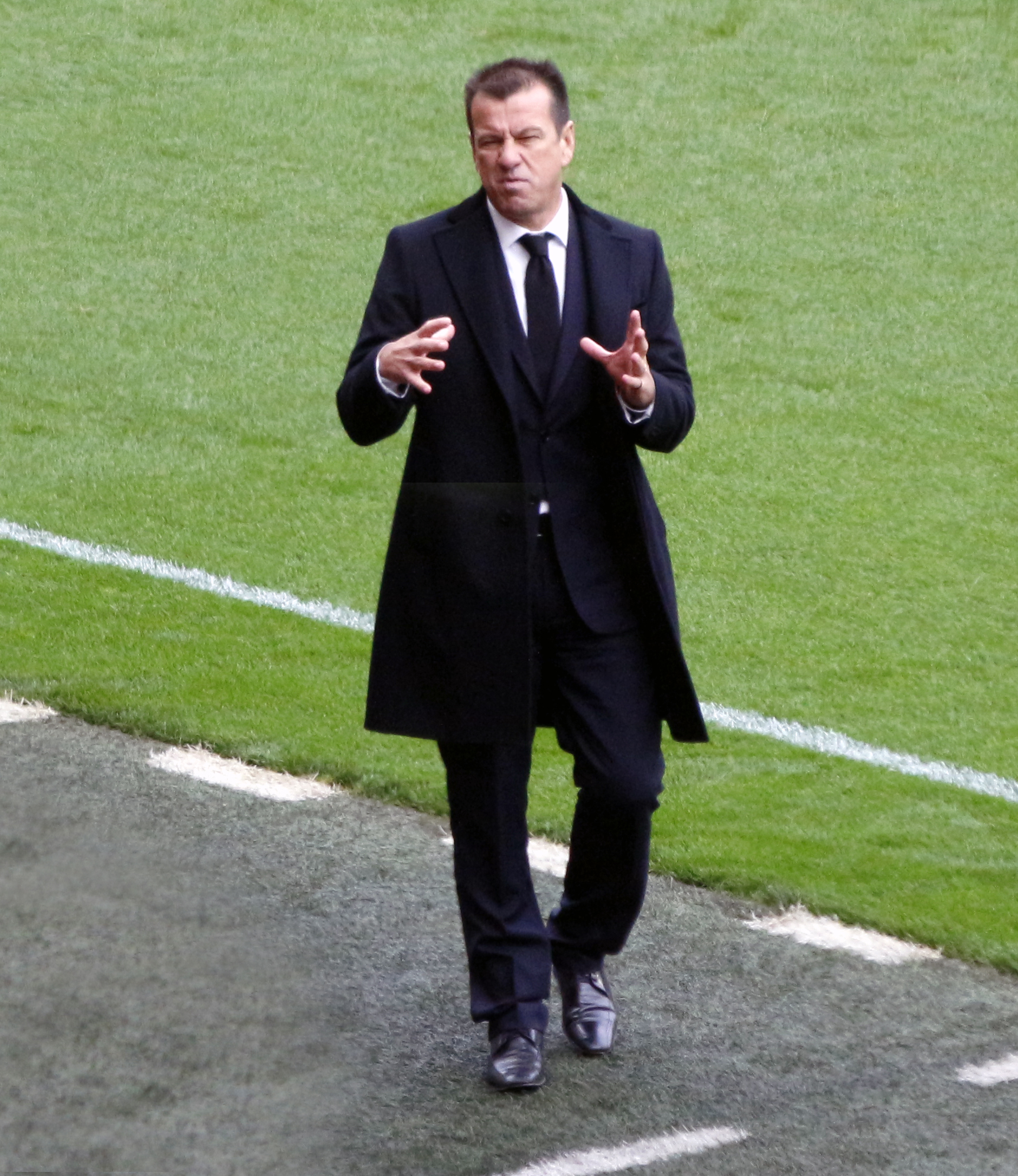
Dunga coaching Brazil in 2015

On 22 July 2014, after four years away, Dunga reassumed coaching duties of Brazil, replacing Luiz Felipe Scolari. His first match was a friendly against 2014 World Cup quarter-finalists Colombia at Sun Life Stadium, Miami on 5 September 2014, where Brazil won 1–0 through an 83rd-minute free kick from Neymar. Following this were victories against Ecuador (1–0) and the 2014 Superclásico de las Américas against Argentina (2–0), as well as Japan (4–0), Turkey (0–4), and Austria (1–2). Dunga continued Brazil's winning streak in 2015 by defeating France (3–1), Chile (1–0), Mexico (2–0), and Honduras (1–0).

==== 2015 Copa América ====
Brazil started the 2015 Copa América with a narrow 2–1 victory against Peru after initially being a goal down (with Douglas Costa scoring in the dying moments), followed by a 1–0 defeat to Colombia and a 2–1 victory over Venezuela. In the knockout stage, Paraguay eliminated Brazil by 4 penalty kicks to 3 after both teams drew 1–1 in normal time. As such, the Seleção was unable to qualify for a FIFA Confederations Cup (in this case, the 2017 edition) for the first time in almost 20 years.

==== Copa América Centenario ====
Brazil began the Copa América Centenario with a scoreless draw against Ecuador, which they could have lost had an Ecuadorian goal not been disallowed in the second half. This was followed by a 7–1 victory over Haiti, with Philippe Coutinho scoring a hat-trick. Needing only a draw to progress to the knockout stage, Brazil suffered a heartbreaking 1–0 loss to Peru, with Raúl Ruidíaz scoring by guiding the ball into the net with his arm. This loss, Brazil's first loss to Peru since 1985, saw Brazil eliminated from the tournament in the group stage for the first time since 1987. On 14 June 2016, he was fired by the CBF.

== Profile ==
=== Player ===
As a player, Dunga was a strong, consistent, and hard-tackling defensive midfielder with good technique, tactical versatility, ball-winning abilities, and a capacity to read the game well and organise his teammates; in particular, he was highly regarded for his anticipation and ability to time his challenges, only going in for tackles or sliding challenges when he deemed it necessary. Despite his more defensive playing role in midfield, he was also capable of contributing creatively and offensively to his teams; he usually positioned himself in front of the defence, which allowed him to protect the defensive line, break down the opposing team's plays, and start transitions and quick attacks with his passing once he won back possession. In his early career, he also used in a box-to-box role courtesy of his stamina, positioning, and ability to get forward and assist with his team's attacks, despite not being the most prolific midfielder; however, he was not particularly quick, and later adapted to a deeper, more defensive position in midfield, where he excelled due to his vision and tactical intelligence. Dunga was also known for his powerful striking ability from distance and from set-pieces, as well as his vision, first touch, and passing range, which also saw him function as a deep-lying playmaker; in this role, he was known for his precise one-touch passing, which allowed him to circulate possession quickly, and he often played long balls over the top to forwards using the outside of his right foot. His athleticism and aggression also allowed him to shield the ball from opponents, allowing him to retain possession under pressure. Considered to be one of the greatest holding midfielders of all time, Dunga was often seen as an atypical Brazilian footballer in the media, however, who was more similar to European midfielders in terms of his composed, efficient, tenacious and physical style of play, which mainly involved winning back possession and distributing the ball to his teammates. Although he lacked the flair of traditional skilful Brazilian midfielders in the mold of Zico, he stood out for his leadership, work-rate and his determination throughout his career, which allowed him to be highly successful with the Brazil national team. However, he consequently also drew at criticism at time from Brazilian fans and pundits alike, due to his more physical, combative, and direct playing style, which also reflected the defensive style of play that the Brazil national team had adopted throughout his international career, in favour of the more exciting attacking style that had often characterised their previous teams; as such, this period during the 1990s came to be known as the "Dunga Era" in the media.

=== Manager ===
During his first spell as manager of the Brazil national football team, Dunga was known for his balanced and pragmatic tactical approach, which was inspired by his time playing in Italy, favouring success over an aesthetically pleasing playing style. His approach was frequently contrasted in the media with Brazil's traditional reputation for attacking and aesthetically expressive football. Dunga instead placed particular emphasis on a strong defensive set-up and counter-attacking football, with the team using quick transitions and incisive passing to score goals after winning back possession, utilising the speed of the team's forwards. During the 2009 Confederations Cup, the team played a fluid 4–2–3–1 system, which could morph into a 4–2–2–2 formation, with Robinho operating as a left winger, but often drifting inside to support centre-forward Luis Fabiano, essentially operating as a second striker. He also used attacking wing-backs to provide width to the team in the attacking phase, and required his forwards to press opposing players off the ball. During the 2010 World Cup, he also made use of two holding midfielders, rather than deep-lying playmakers, as well as Ramires as a defensive right winger. These decisions were criticised in the media, along with the team's perceived dull playing style, and Dunga's omission of several talented attacking players such as Ronaldinho, Diego, Ganso, Neymar, Adriano, and Pato, due to the team's perceived lack of creativity in slower-paced matches, in which counter-attacking was not possible. In addition to his tactical approach, he was also known for his strict attitude with his players as a coach.

== Philanthropy and community work ==
Since the early 1990s, Dunga has been involved in charitable and community initiatives in Rio Grande do Sul. In 2001, he helped establish the Projeto Esporte Clube Cidadāo in the Restinga district of Porto Alegre, providing educational, sporting and vocational opportunities for local children and families.

During the COVID-19 pandemic, Dunga founded the Seleção do Bem 8 initiative, which provides food distribution, housing renovations and other forms of assistance to vulnerable communities in Porto Alegre.

== Career statistics ==
=== Club ===
Appearances and goals by club, season and competition
Club	Season	League			National cup (Note: Includes Coppa Italia, Emperor's Cup)		League cup (Note: Includes J.League Cup)		Continental		Total	
Club	Season	Division	Apps	Goals	Apps	Goals	Apps	Goals	Apps	Goals	Apps	Goals
Internacional	1982	Série A	1	0							1	0
Internacional	1983	Série A	4	0							4	0
Internacional	1984	Série A	5	0							5	0
Internacional	Total		10	0							10	0
Corinthians	1985	Série A	13	1							13	1
Santos	1986	Série A	16	1							16	1
Vasco da Gama	1987	Série A	17	1							17	1
Pisa	1987–88	Serie A	23	2	6	1	—		—		29	3
Fiorentina	1988–89	Serie A	30	3	8	1	—		—		38	4
Fiorentina	1989–90	Serie A	28	0	2	1	—		11 (Note: Appearances in UEFA Cup)	0	41	1
Fiorentina	1990–91	Serie A	33	1	6	1	—		—		39	2
Fiorentina	1991–92	Serie A	33	4	4	1	—		—		37	5
Fiorentina	Total		124	8	20	4	0	0	11	0	155	12
Pescara	1992–93	Serie A	23	3	—		—		—		23	3
VfB Stuttgart	1993–94	Bundesliga	27	4							27	4
VfB Stuttgart	1994–95	Bundesliga	26	4							26	4
VfB Stuttgart	Total		53	8							53	8
Júbilo Iwata	1995	J1 League	25	1	2	0	—		—		27	1
Júbilo Iwata	1996	J1 League	20	4	1	0	13	0	—		34	4
Júbilo Iwata	1997	J1 League	26	5	0	0	11	1	—		37	6
Júbilo Iwata	1998	J1 League	28	6	0	0	0	0	—		28	6
Júbilo Iwata	Total		99	16	3	0	24	1	—		126	17
Internacional	1999	Série A	15	1							15	1
Career total			393	41	29	5	24	1	11	0	457	47

=== International ===
Appearances and goals by national team and year
National team	Year	Apps	Goals
Brazil	1987	4	1
Brazil	1988	0	0
Brazil	1989	15	0
Brazil	1990	6	1
Brazil	1991	0	0
Brazil	1992	0	0
Brazil	1993	13	1
Brazil	1994	13	1
Brazil	1995	14	1
Brazil	1996	0	0
Brazil	1997	17	1
Brazil	1998	9	0
Total		91	6

Scores and results list Brazil's goal tally first, score column indicates score after each Dunga goal.

List of international goals scored by Dunga
No.	Date	Venue	Opponent	Score	Result	Competition	Ref.
1	1 June 1987	Ramat Gan Stadium, Ramat Gan, Israel	Israel	2–0	4–0	Friendly	
2	13 May 1990	Maracanã Stadium, Rio de Janeiro, Brazil	East Germany	3–1	3–3	Friendly	
3	22 August 1993	Estádio do Morumbi, São Paulo, Brazil	Ecuador	2–0	2–0	1994 FIFA World Cup qualification	
4	8 June 1994	San Diego Stadium, San Diego, United States	Honduras	7–2	8–2	Friendly	
5	12 August 1995	Suwon Stadium, Suwon, South Korea	South Korea	1–0	1–0	Friendly	
6	19 June 1997	Estadio Ramón Tahuichi Aguilera, Santa Cruz, Bolivia	Colombia	1–0	2–0	1997 Copa América	

=== Coaching record ===
As of 12 June 2016

Team	From	To	Record^{1}				
Team	From	To	G	W	D	L	Win %
Brazil	24 July 2006	2 July 2010	60	42	12	6	70.00
Brazil Olympic Team	22 June 2008	22 August 2008	9	8	0	1	88.89
Internacional	12 December 2012	26 October 2013	52	25	18	9	48.08
Brazil	22 July 2014	4 June 2016	26	18	5	3	69.23
Total			157	103	35	19	65.61

== Honours ==
=== Player ===
Internacional

- Rio Grande do Sul State League: 1982, 1983, 1984
- Torneio Heleno Nunes: 1994

Vasco da Gama

- Rio de Janeiro State League: 1987

Júbilo Iwata

- J. League: 1997

Brazil U-20

- FIFA U-20 World Cup: 1983
- South American Youth Championship: 1983

Brazil

- FIFA World Cup: 1994
- FIFA Confederations Cup: 1997
- Copa América: 1989, 1997
- Olympic Silver Medal: 1984
- Pan American Games Silver Medal: 1983
- South American Pre-Olympic Tournament: 1984

Individual

- World Soccer World XI: 1990, 1991
- FIFA World Cup All-Star Team: 1994, 1998
- J. League Most Valuable Player: 1997
- J. League Best Eleven: 1997, 1998
- World XI: 1997, 1998, 1999, 2000
- Venerdi's 100 Magnifici
- Golden Foot: 2010, as a football legend
- Fiorentina All-time XI

=== Manager ===
Internacional

- Rio Grande do Sul State League: 2013

Brazil

- Copa América: 2007
- Olympic Bronze Medal: 2008
- FIFA Confederations Cup: 2009
- Superclásico de las Américas: 2014

Individual

- IFFHS World's Best National Coach: 2007

== See also ==
- List of Brazil national football team managers
