= Pedro Santilli =

Braziian footballer

Personal information
- Full name: Pedro Roberto Santilli
- Date of birth: 9 August 1946
- Place of birth: Ribeirão Preto, Brazil
- Date of death: 31 January 2022 (aged 75)
- Place of death: Ribeirão Preto, Brazil
- Position: Goalkeeper

Senior career*
Years	Team	Apps	(Gls)
- Comercial-SP
- Jaboticabal
- Sertãozinho
- Batatais

Managerial career
- 1998–1999: Santos (assistant)
- 1999: Internacional (assistant)
- 2000: Grêmio (assistant)
- 2000: Sport Recife (assistant)
- 2000: Brazil (caretaker)
- 2000–2001: Brazil (assistant)
- 2002–2004: Santos (assistant)
- 2004: Cruzeiro (assistant)
- 2004–2005: São Paulo (assistant)
- 2005: Vissel Kobe (assistant)
- 2005–2006: Palmeiras (assistant)
- 2006: São Caetano (assistant)
- 2006–2007: Corinthians (assistant)
- 2007: Atlético Mineiro (assistant)
- 2007: Sertãozinho
- 2008: Santos (assistant)
- 2009: Comercial-SP
- * Club domestic league appearances and goals as of 4 August 2025

Pedro Santilli (9 August 1946 – 31 January 2022) was a Brazilian professional footballer who played as a goalkeeper and a manager.

== Playing career ==
As a goalkeeper, Santilli played for Comercial, Jaboticabal, Sertãozinho and Batatais.

== Managerial career ==
After retiring as a player, Santilli worked as a goalkeeper coach for several teams, notably Portuguesa, Santos and Grêmio. From 1998 onwards, he became an assistant to his friend and fellow countryman Émerson Leão. On 15 November 2000, Santilli led the Brazil national team against Colombia, in a match valid for the 2002 FIFA World Cup qualification, due to Leão's suspension by the STJD (Brazilian sports court) who insulted referee Fabiano Gonçalves while he was still managing Sport Recife. In 2007 he carried out his first independent work as a coach, for Sertãozinho, and in 2009 for Comercial de Ribeirão Preto. On 13 April 2009, Santilli punched referee Flávio Rodrigues de Souza in the match that resulted in Comercial's relegation that season. He was given a six-month suspension, but abandoned his coaching career after the incident.

== Death ==
Santilli died in Ribeirão Preto at the age of 75, after two weeks in hospital due to a heart attack.
