= Chico Netto =

Brazilian footballer and manager (1894–1959)

Personal information
- Full name: Francisco Bueno Netto
- Date of birth: 9 April 1894
- Place of birth: Moji-Mirim, Brazil
- Date of death: 18 June 1959 (aged 65)
- Place of death: Maringá, Brazil
- Position: Defender

Senior career*
Years	Team	Apps	(Gls)
1908–1911	Amparo		
1912	América		
1913	Americano-SP		
1914–1915	São Bento		
1915–1924	Fluminense		

International career
1917	Brazil	3	(1)

Managerial career
- 1917: Brazil
- 1923: Brazil
- * Club domestic league appearances and goals

Francisco Bueno Netto (9 April 1894 – 18 June 1959), known as Chico Netto, was a Brazilian football player and coach. A defender, he played for Amparo, América, Americano-SP, São Bento and Fluminense.

Netto also briefly managed the Brazil national side in 1917, making three appearances (scoring one goal) during that time. He later managed the national side again in 1923.
