= Luiz Felipe Scolari =

Brazilian football manager (born 1948)

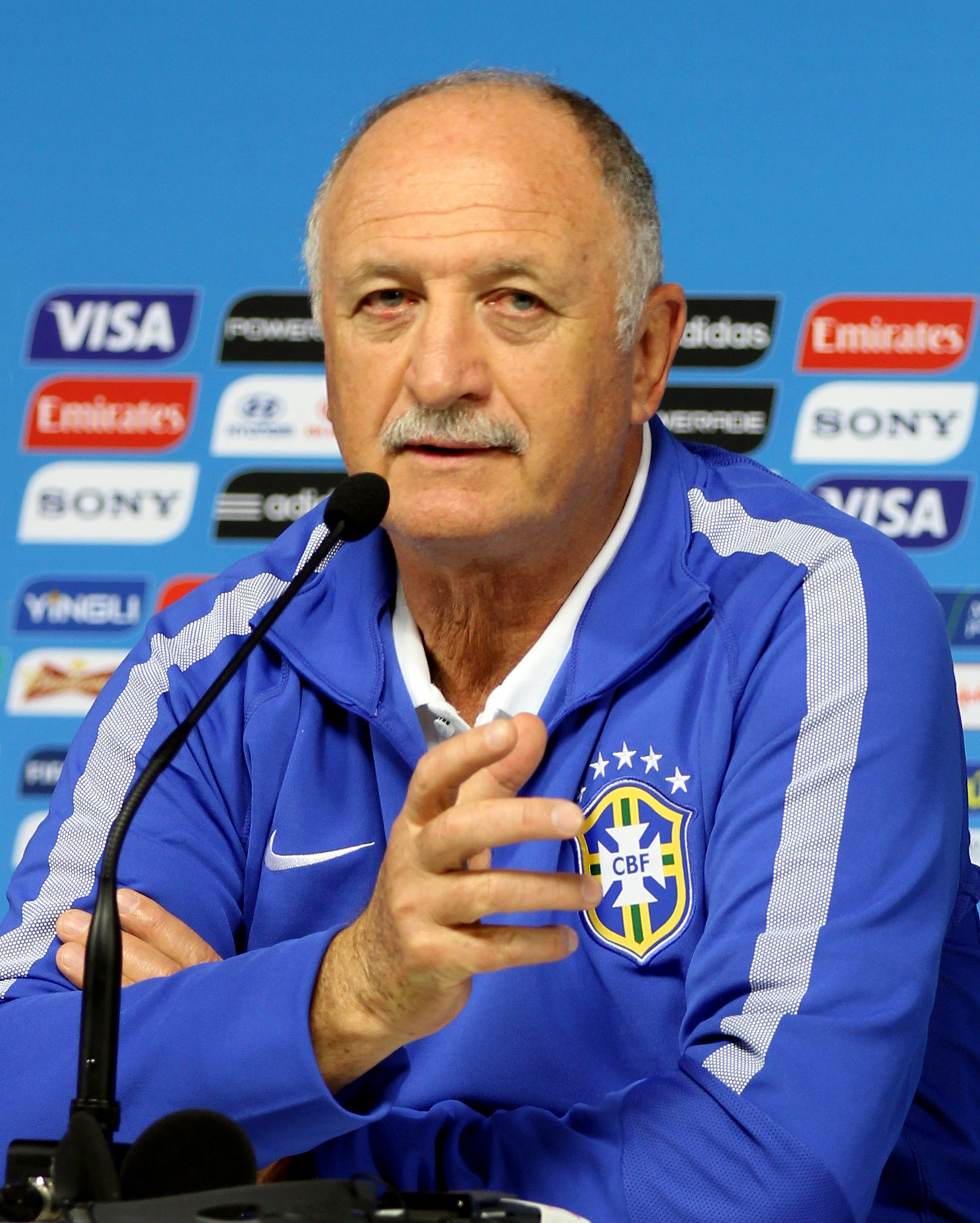
- Scolari at a press conference at the 2014 FIFA World Cup

Personal information
- Full name: Luiz Felipe Scolari
- Date of birth: 9 November 1948 (age 77)
- Place of birth: Passo Fundo, Brazil
- Height: 1.82 m (5 ft 11 1/2 in)
- Position: Defender

Team information
- Current team: Grêmio (technical director)

Senior career*
Years	Team	Apps	(Gls)
1966–1973	Aimoré		
1973–1979	Caxias	67	(0)
1980	Juventude		
1980–1981	Novo Hamburgo		
1981	CSA		

Managerial career
- 1982: CSA
- 1982–1983: Juventude
- 1983: Brasil de Pelotas
- 1984–1985: Al-Shabab
- 1986: Pelotas
- 1986–1987: Juventude
- 1987: Grêmio
- 1988: Goiás
- 1988–1990: Al-Qadsia
- 1990: Kuwait
- 1990: Coritiba
- 1991: Criciúma
- 1991: Al-Ahli
- 1992: Al-Qadsia
- 1993–1996: Grêmio
- 1997: Júbilo Iwata
- 1998–2000: Palmeiras
- 2000–2001: Cruzeiro
- 2001–2002: Brazil
- 2003–2008: Portugal
- 2008–2009: Chelsea
- 2009–2010: Bunyodkor
- 2010–2012: Palmeiras
- 2012–2014: Brazil
- 2014–2015: Grêmio
- 2015–2017: Guangzhou Evergrande
- 2018–2019: Palmeiras
- 2020–2021: Cruzeiro
- 2021: Grêmio
- 2022: Athletico Paranaense
- 2023–2024: Atlético Mineiro
Medal record
Men's football
Representing Brazil (as manager)
FIFA World Cup
Winner	2002 Korea/Japan
FIFA Confederations Cup
Winner	2013 Brazil
Representing Portugal (as manager)
UEFA European Championship
Runner-up	2004 Portugal
- * Club domestic league appearances and goals

Luiz Felipe Scolari OIH (Brazilian Portuguese: [luˈis feˈlipi skoˈlaɾi, - fiˈ-]; born 9 November 1948), also known as Felipão ("Big Phil"), is a Brazilian football manager and former player who is the technical director of Campeonato Brasileiro Série A club Grêmio.

Considered to be one of the greatest and most successful managers of all time by several pundits, Scolari was a defender during his playing days, and notably represented Caxias before moving to a managerial role in 1982. After leading the Brazil national team to a FIFA World Cup win in 2002, he was manager of the Portugal national team from July 2003 to June 2008. He led Portugal to the final of UEFA Euro 2004, which they lost 0–1 to Greece, and to a fourth-place finish in the 2006 World Cup. Scolari also managed Portugal through UEFA Euro 2008, but resigned after a 2–3 loss to Germany in the quarter-finals.

After a return to club management at Chelsea in the Premier League and elsewhere, Scolari was hired again as manager of the Brazil national team in 2012. He led them to victory at the 2013 Confederations Cup, and to the semi-finals in the 2014 World Cup, both held at home. After the Brazil national team finished fourth in an upset 1–7 loss to Germany in the semi-final and lost 0–3 to the Netherlands in the third-place playoff, the Brazilian Football Confederation decided not to renew his contract. In 2015, he started work at Guangzhou Evergrande and went on to claim both the 2015 Chinese Super League and 2015 AFC Champions League in his first season with the club. He returned to Palmeiras in 2018, winning his second Brazilian league title that year.

Scolari is a dual citizen of Brazil and Italy, as he is descended from Italian immigrants.

== Playing career ==
Scolari was born in Passo Fundo, Rio Grande do Sul. A defender regarded as more uncompromising than skillful, he was known among his contemporaries as "Perna-de-Pau" (literally translated as "wooden leg" in Portuguese, a Brazilian slang for a bad player), Scolari followed in the footsteps of his father, Benjamin Scolari, who was also a professional footballer. His playing career encompassed spells with Caxias, Juventude, Novo Hamburgo, and CSA; he often captained his sides. It was with CSA that he won his only major title as a player – the 1981 Campeonato Alagoano.

== Style of play ==
A central defender, Scolari described himself as a player who was tough, physically strong, and who had a good positional sense and leadership qualities, despite not being a particularly skilful player, which made him a useful player for his teams. Throughout his career he was nicknamed "Perna-de-Pau," or "Wooden Leg," in Portuguese, due to his perceived lack of class on the ball.

== Managerial career ==
=== Early career ===
Upon retiring as a player in 1982, he was appointed manager of CSA, his former club, and would go on to win the Alagoas state championship in his first season. After spells with Juventude (twice), Brasil de Pelotas and Pelotas and Saudi Arabian side Al Shabab, he moved to Grêmio, where he won the 1987 Gaúcho state championship. After managing Goiás, Scolari had a two-year stint in charge of Kuwaiti side Qadsia, with whom he won the prestigious Kuwait Emir Cup in 1989. This was followed by a brief period as manager of the Kuwait national team, winning the 10th Gulf Cup in Kuwait. Scolari returned to Brazil to coach Coritiba. He stayed for just three matches, losing all of them. After the last loss, he abandoned the club by boarding the winning team's bus back to his hometown; and did not return even to collect his wages. Scolari coached Criciúma to their first major national title, in the 1991 Copa do Brasil. He returned to club management in the Middle East, managing Al-Ahli and a second spell at Qadsia.

=== Return to Grêmio ===
In 1993, Scolari returned to Grêmio, where, albeit leading the team to historic victories, he was criticized by the Brazilian media for playing a pragmatic style of football regarded as "un-Brazilian". He claimed six titles in only three years, including the 1995 Copa Libertadores, which qualified Grêmio for the Intercontinental Cup, which they lost to Dutch side Ajax on penalties. The following year, they won the Brazilian Championship.

His team didn't have one clear superstar and instead depended on hardworking players such as Paraguayan right back Francisco Arce, tough-tackling midfielder Dinho, Paulo Nunes, and centre forward Mário Jardel.

=== Júbilo Iwata ===
In 1997, Scolari became manager of J. League side Júbilo Iwata, but left after eleven games and shortly afterwards took charge of Palmeiras back in Brazil.

=== Palmeiras ===
In three years as manager, Scolari led Palmeiras to the Copa do Brasil, the Mercosur Cup, and their first Copa Libertadores title with a win on penalties over Deportivo Cali of Colombia. They were also runners-up to Manchester United in the 1999 Intercontinental Cup. He was named South American Coach of the Year for 1999.

=== Cruzeiro ===
In 2000, Scolari was appointed to manage Minas Gerais club Cruzeiro, coaching them for a year.

=== Brazil ===
In June 2001, Scolari was appointed manager of his native Brazil, the team's third coach in the space of a year. With five qualifying matches ahead, the team were in jeopardy of not qualifying for the 2002 FIFA World Cup, which would be a first in the Brazilian competitive record. Despite losing his first match 1–0 to Uruguay, and also suffering a 2–1 defeat to rivals Argentina in September, Scolari eventually guided the team to qualification for the tournament. He also led the team through the 2001 Copa América, where they were unexpectedly eliminated in the quarter-finals by Honduras following a 2–0 defeat. After the match, Scolari commented: "I will go down in history as the Brazil coach who lost to Honduras – it's horrible. But Honduras played better, they deserved their win."

In the build-up to the 2002 World Cup finals, Scolari refused to include veteran striker Romário in his squad, despite public pressure and a tearful appeal from the player himself. Brazil entered the tournament unfancied, but wins over Turkey, China, Costa Rica, Belgium, England and Turkey again took them to the final, where they beat Germany 2–0 with two goals from Ronaldo to win their fifth FIFA World Cup title. Scolari resigned in August 2002, intending to move to Europe.

=== Portugal ===
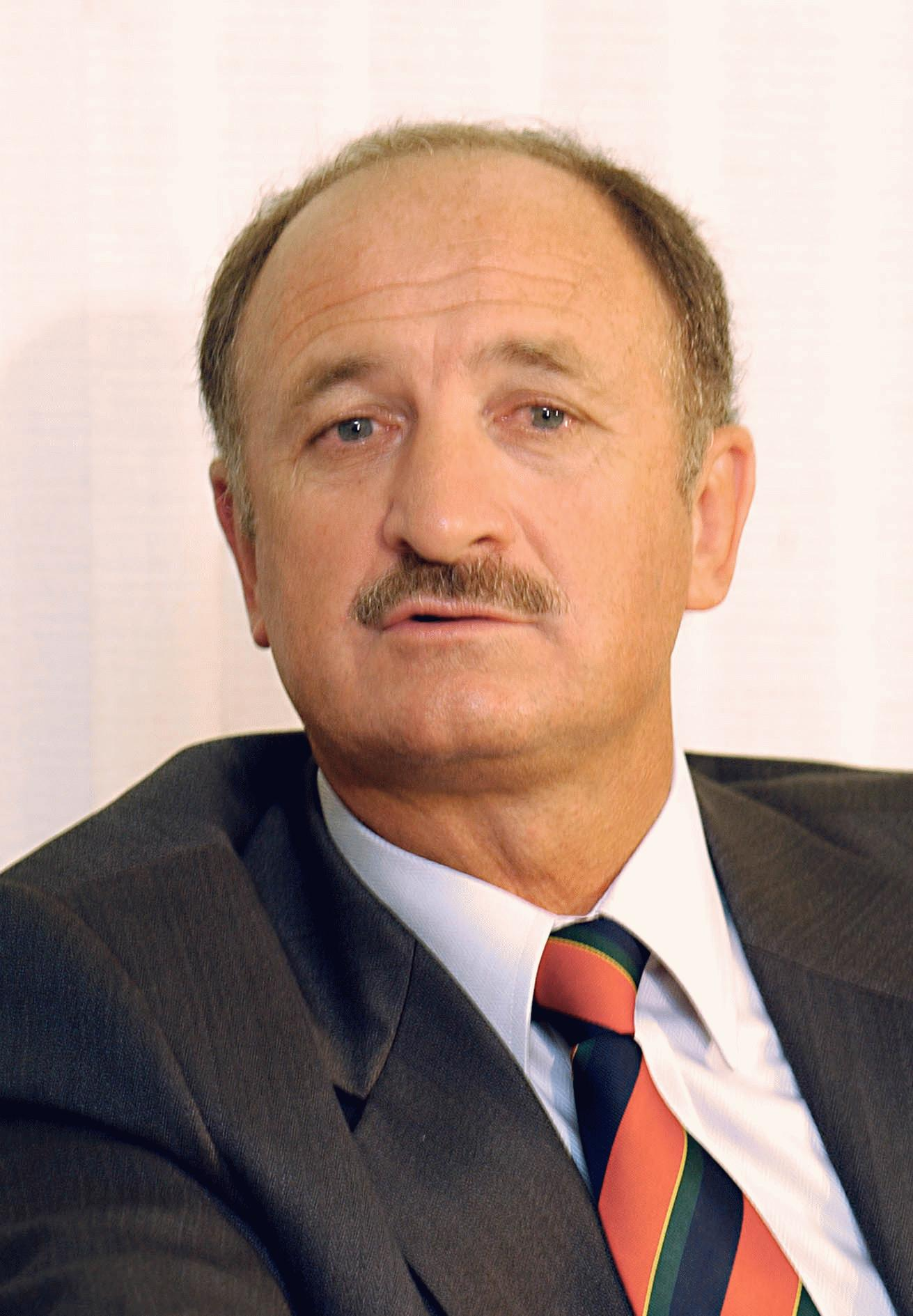
Scolari in 2003

In November 2002 Scolari was appointed coach of Portugal, who would be the host nation for UEFA Euro 2004. The appointment was controversial as Scolari was highly paid, and was the first foreigner to coach Portugal since Otto Glória. Scolari caused more controversy by calling up Brazil-born Deco, who had only recently become eligible for Portuguese citizenship. At Euro 2004, Portugal got through the group stage and saw off England in the quarter-finals on penalties before beating the Netherlands in the semi-finals. In the final, however, they were beaten in a 1–0 upset by tournament underdogs Greece. Scolari managed Portugal through the 2006 World Cup in Germany, where they reached the semi-finals, again coming out victorious in the quarter-finals against England. But they did not reach the final due to a semi-final defeat against eventual runners-up France. Following the tournament, Scolari was strongly linked with the job of England manager, but chose to see out his contract with Portugal.

Scolari took Portugal to Euro 2008, where they reached the knockout stage by placing first in Group A before being eliminated by Germany in the quarter-finals. During the tournament, he announced that he would be joining English side Chelsea for the 2008–09 season.

=== Chelsea ===
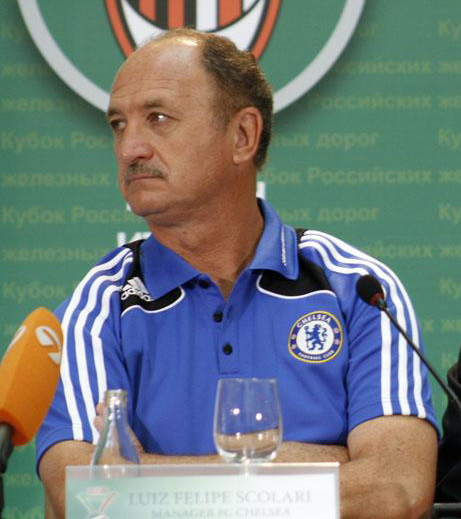
Scolari with Chelsea in 2008

Scolari took over as manager of Chelsea on 1 July 2008. This was announced shortly after Portugal's Euro 2008 match against the Czech Republic on 11 June. With this appointment, Scolari became the first World Cup-winning manager to manage in the Premier League. In previous press conferences, Scolari had talked about "tantrums" and "triumphs" and had a reputation as a tough and unpredictable person. When asked whether his decision to join Chelsea was financial, he responded, "Yes, that is one of the reasons," but also added, "I'm 59 and I don't want to work as a coach until I'm 70. I want to retire in four or five years, so it was a financial matter but there are other things." He also said, "I could offer my son the opportunity to study elsewhere. You only get this kind of opportunity once so you take it or leave it, but it was not only financial." Scolari later said that he had turned down an offer to manage Manchester City.

Scolari's first match in charge of Chelsea was a friendly match against Chinese side Guangzhou Pharmaceutical, a 4–0 victory. He made Barcelona midfielder Deco, a player he was familiar with on the Portugal national team, his first signing for a fee of around £8 million, but was subsequently frustrated in his attempts to sign Brazilian international Robinho from Real Madrid. Under Scolari, Chelsea had the biggest away win of the club in five years in which Chelsea won 5–0 at the Riverside Stadium in October 2008. It was also the club's biggest win ever at Middlesbrough.

Scolari was sacked as Chelsea manager on 9 February 2009 after a run of poor form culminating in a 2–0 defeat at Liverpool followed by frustrating 0–0 home draw with Hull City. The club's stated reason for his removal was that "the results and performances of the team appeared to be deteriorating at a key time in the season". Scolari's replacement at Chelsea for the remainder of the 2008–09 season was Dutch manager Guus Hiddink, who simultaneously managed the Russia national team.

=== Bunyodkor ===
On 6 June 2009, Scolari was spotted in attendance at Uzbekistan's World Cup qualifier against Japan; on 8 June 2009, Scolari revealed that he had signed an 18-month contract with the Uzbekistani champions FC Bunyodkor. The contract made Scolari the highest paid football manager in the world, earning €13 million a year.

He left by mutual consent on 29 May 2010 after failing to guide Bunyodkor past the last 16 in the AFC Champions League, although he cited concern regarding his son's education as the key reason.

=== Return to Palmeiras ===
On 13 June 2010, Scolari was announced as Palmeiras' new manager. He signed a 2 1/2-year contract. Palmeiras were 2012 Copa do Brasil champions under his management. In September 2012, Scolari left by mutual consent after an unsatisfying result in the Campeonato Brasileiro.

=== Return to Brazil ===
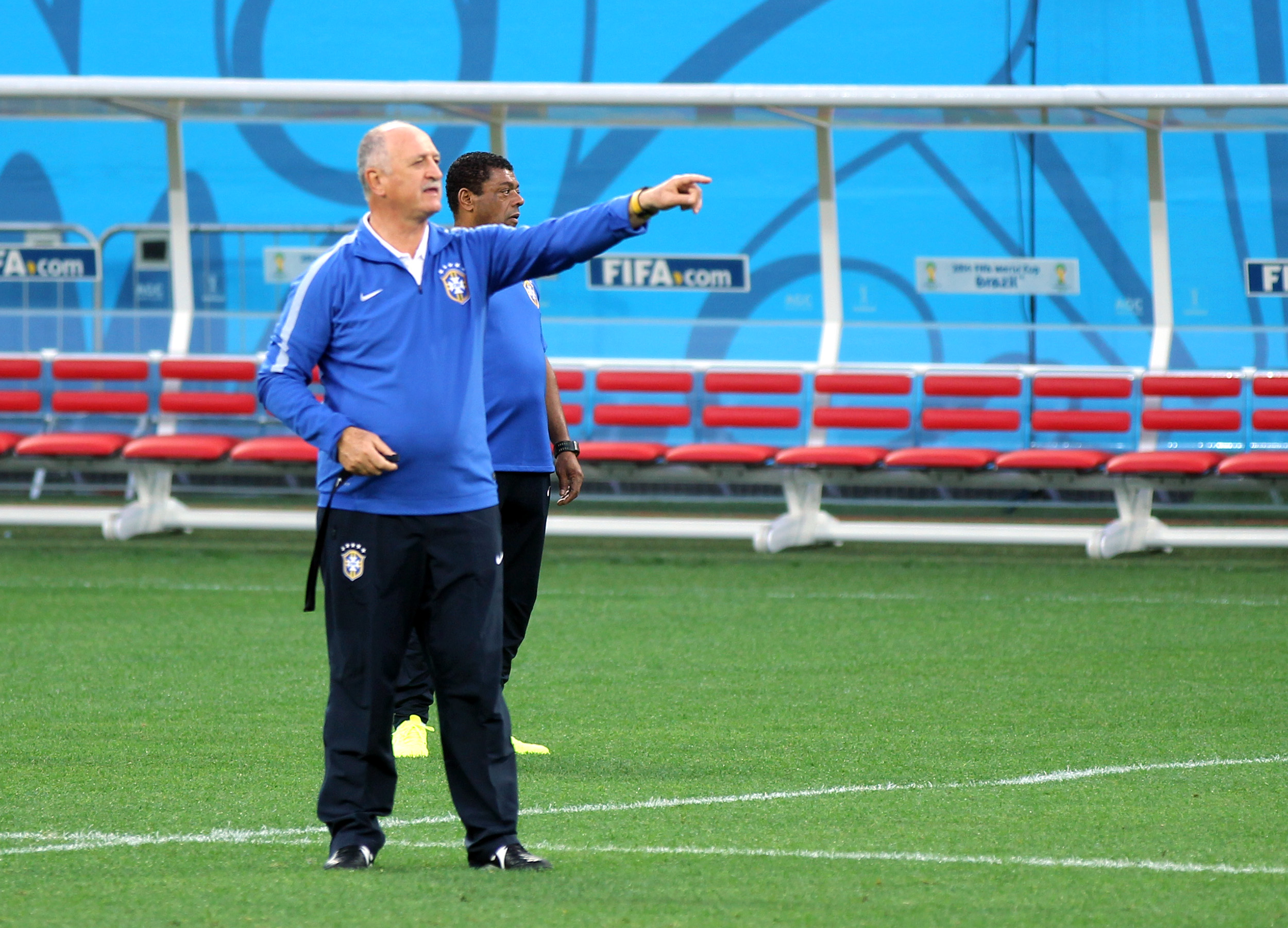
Scolari overseeing a training session at the 2014 FIFA World Cup

In November 2012, after two months without a club, Scolari returned to managing the Brazil national team, replacing the outgoing Mano Menezes. He was tasked with securing a win in the 2014 FIFA World Cup, in which Brazil would be hosts. Scolari had previously won the 2002 FIFA World Cup as manager of Brazil.

Under Scolari, Brazil beat Japan 3–0 in the opening game of the 2013 FIFA Confederations Cup, with goals from Neymar in the third minute, Paulinho in the 48th minute and Jô on the 90th minute. Three days later, his team won 2–0 over Mexico, with Neymar scoring again in the ninth minute.

Brazil defeated Uruguay 2–1 in the semi-final match of the 2013 FIFA Confederations Cup in a tough draw, with goals from Fred in the 41st minute paired with a late goal from Paulinho in the 86th minute. In the final, Brazil defeated Spain 3–0 with two goals from Fred and one from Neymar.

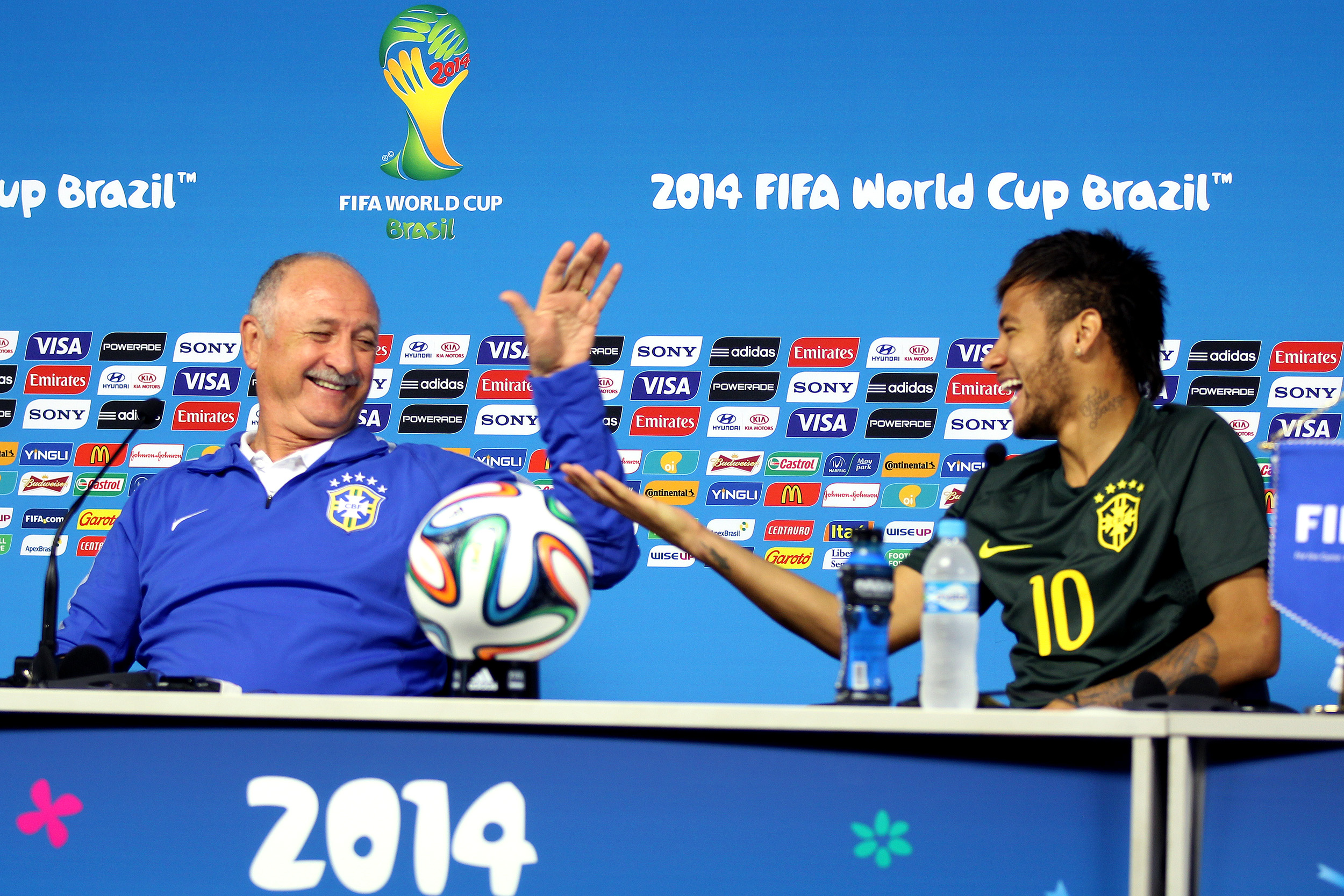
Scolari with Brazilian forward Neymar at a press conference at the 2014 FIFA World Cup

After a successful campaign which earned them a semi-final spot in the 2014 FIFA World Cup, Brazil were defeated 7–1 in an upset loss against Germany at the semi-final stage, which became their biggest-ever defeat at the World Cup (their largest margin of defeat was previously losing 3–0 to France in the 1998 final), the record for most goals conceded in their World Cup track record and its first home loss in a competitive match since 1975. Scolari described the match as "the worst day of [his] life", and took responsibility for the loss.

On 14 July 2014, following a further 3–0 defeat in the third place playoff match against the Netherlands, Scolari resigned from his position as Brazilian manager.

=== Third return to Grêmio ===
On 29 July 2014, Scolari signed with Grêmio. He was officially unveiled by the club the following day at the Arena do Grêmio. On 19 May 2015, Scolari resigned from his position after a poor start to the season.

=== Guangzhou Evergrande ===
On 4 June 2015, Scolari was appointed head coach of Chinese Super League champions Guangzhou Evergrande, signing a one-and-a-half plus one-year contract. After four months in charge, Scolari led the club to victory in the 2015 Chinese Super League and AFC Champions League, defeating Cosmin Olăroiu's Al-Ahli side with a 1–0 aggregate win in the final. He extended his contract for one year on 24 October 2016 after his potential successor Marcello Lippi was appointed as the manager of China national team. Scolari led Guangzhou win three consecutive league titles from 2015 to 2017. He refused to extend his contract again by the end of 2017 season.

=== Third return to Palmeiras ===
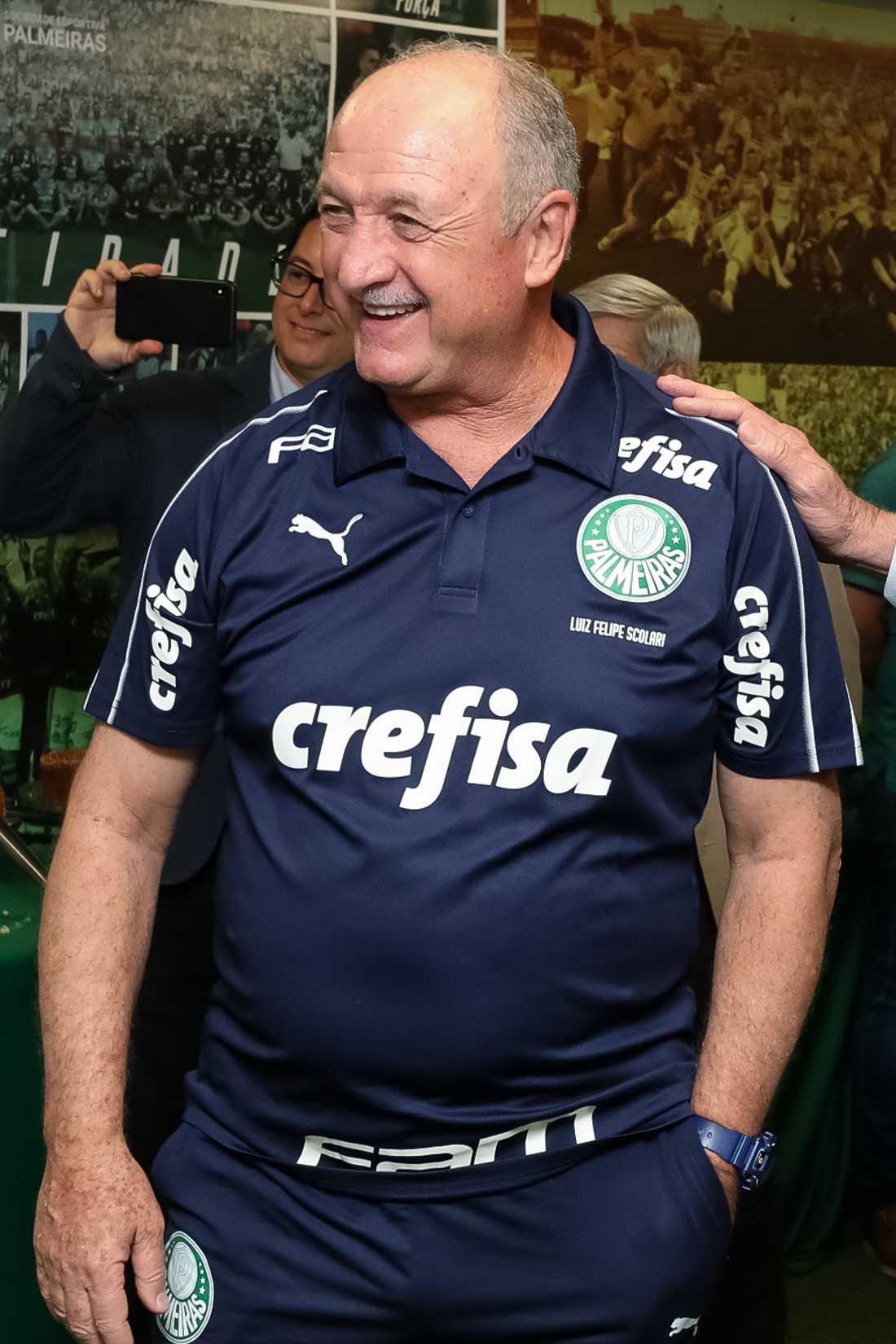
Scolari with Palmeiras in 2019

On 27 July 2018, Scolari returned to Brazilian side Palmeiras for a third time. On 2 September 2019, Scolari would be fired by club, that is under a poor performance after 2019 Copa America; in this period, Scolari gained only 23.8% of points played by Palmeiras.

=== Return to Cruzeiro ===
On 15 October 2020, Scolari returned to manage the football team of Cruzeiro. On 25 January 2021, Scolari and Cruzeiro parted ways by mutual agreement.

=== Fourth return to Grêmio ===
On 7 July 2021, Scolari returned to Grêmio for the fourth time, with the goal of moving the team out of the last place in the Brasileiro Série A and fighting for the Copa Sudamericana. He left on a mutual agreement on 11 October, with the club second bottom of the league.

=== Athletico Paranaense ===
On 4 May 2022, Scolari was hired by Athletico Paranaense as a technical director, being also a manager of the first team "until new definitions". With favorable results, he ended up coaching the side for the remainder of the season, leading them to the 2022 Copa Libertadores final, lost 1–0 to Flamengo. He stepped down as head coach and continued at the club solely as a director in the 2023 season, appointing his assistant Paulo Turra as his successor.

=== Atlético Mineiro ===
On 16 June 2023, Scolari accepted an offer to resume his coaching career at Atlético Mineiro, signing a one-and-a-half-year deal. He led the club to an impressive run in the 2023 Série A, but left on a mutual agreement on 20 March 2024, despite the club being in the 2024 Campeonato Mineiro finals.

== Personal life ==
Scolari also holds Italian citizenship, since his family emigrated from Veneto. He is a fan of Grêmio, and was reported to be a fan of Nottingham Forest, having watched their successes under Brian Clough in the 1970s. Scolari is a Roman Catholic.

During his career, the media has been fond of pointing out Scolari's facial resemblance to actor Gene Hackman and Marlon Brando's portrayal of Don Vito Corleone in the film The Godfather. In Brazil, Scolari is also known as "Felipão", and during his stint with Chelsea, he was sometimes referred by the English translation, Big Phil.

== Style of management ==
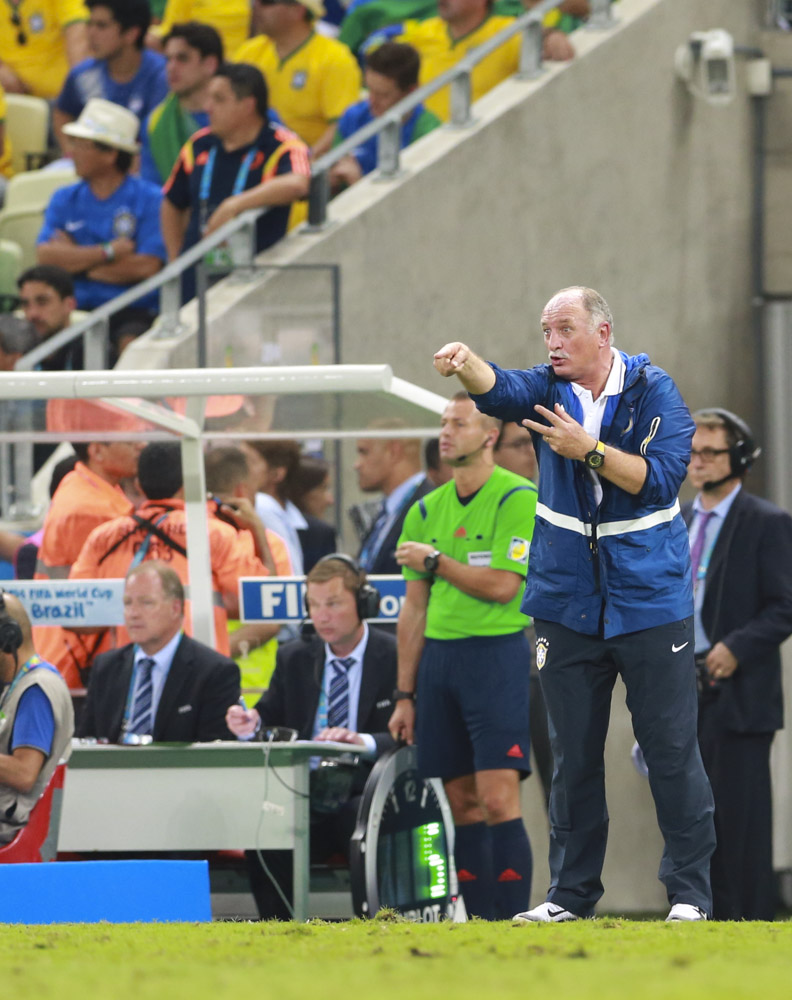
Scolari managing Brazil at the 2014 FIFA World Cup

Considered to be one of the greatest and most successful managers of all time by several pundits, in 2024 90min.com attributed Scolari's success to his unpredictable, authoritarian, and "enigmatic style, with his ability to inspire his players proving to be as important as his tactical prowess." Nicknamed "Felipão," or "Big Phil," in Portuguese, in the early part of his coaching career, he was known for his no-nonsense style of football. However, in the 1990s, he adopted a more attractive style of play, and his teams became more clinical offensively. He was also known for fostering a team spirit and for using religion-inspired motivational techniques, and attempted to shelter his teams from the media. His relationship with the press was often complicated, however, due to his passionate and temperamental style, which saw him involved in conflicts with journalists. He was also known for his intensity on the sidelines.

Throughout his career, Scolari was known for his balanced tactical approach defensively and offensively, as well as his flexibility, adopting several different formations, including the 4–3–2–1, 3–4–1–2, and 4–3–3. He often gave his players lots of freedom on the pitch. The midfielders were paramount to his sides' offensive strategy, as they were required to make runs through central areas. The gameplay of his wingers was also an important part of his tactical approach, as he often had them switch positions in order to provide a diverse range of attacking plays for his team.

With Grêmio and Palmeiras, he often used a 4–4–2 formation, which was solid defensively, and which made use of quick transitions and counter-attacks. During his first stint as Brazil's manager, he initially played a more defensive style, but took a more attacking approach during the 2002 World Cup, using a 3–5–2, 3–4–1–2, or 3–4–2–1 formation with Cafu and Roberto Carlos as attacking wing-backs supporting the front line, which complemented the ability of his team's talented forwards – Ronaldo, Rivaldo, and Ronaldinho, as well as the passing ability of his midfielders. His side also made use of quick transitions and counter-attacks.

With Portugal, Scolari also adopted an entertaining playing style based on passing, which highlighted the skill of his players, but also placed an emphasis on tactical preparation, pragmatism, and the psychological aspect of the game. Former Portugal midfielder Deco praised Scolari for his ability to motivate the team during the 2006 World Cup. During the latter tournament, Scolari used a 4–2–3–1 formation with wingers Cristiano Ronaldo and Luís Figo on the left and right flanks respectively, often switching sides and running at opposing defenders.

During his second stint with Brazil, Scolari instead adopted a flexible 4–2–3–1 and successfully stifled Spain's possession during the 2013 Confederations Cup final through the use of heavy pressing, in particular on the opposing team's holding midfielder Sergio Busquets. He also made use of a solid defence, who played a high line, hard-working box-to-box midfielders, and used Oscar as an attacking midfielder, who was given defensive responsibilities but also the freedom to join the attack, while Neymar played as a left winger, supporting a genuine lone centre-forward upfront.

== Managerial statistics ==
As of 20 March 2024

Managerial record by team and tenure
Team	Nat.	From	To	Record								Ref.
Team	Nat.	From	To	G	W	D	L	GF	GA	GD	Win %	Ref.
CSA	(Brazil)	1 January 1982	30 April 1982	8	1	4	3	9	13	−4	12.50	
Juventude	(Brazil)	1 May 1982	31 May 1983	22	6	9	7	14	27	−13	27.27	
Brasil de Pelotas	(Brazil)	1 June 1983	31 December 1983	38	13	16	9	33	29	+4	34.21	
Al-Shabab	(Saudi Arabia)	1984	1985	43	16	18	9	52	42	+10	37.21	
Pelotas	(Brazil)	1 January 1986	31 August 1986	26	5	12	9	21	36	−15	19.23	
Juventude	(Brazil)	1 September 1986	31 May 1987	34	10	19	5	43	30	+13	29.41	
Grêmio	(Brazil)	1 June 1987	29 February 1988	30	16	10	4	40	19	+21	53.33	
Goiás	(Brazil)	1 March 1988	30 June 1988	34	24	8	2	62	14	+48	70.59	
Al-Qadsia	(Kuwait)	1988	1990	41	17	8	16	46	39	+7	41.46	
Kuwait	(Kuwait)	16 July 1990	10 December 1990	8	4	2	2	6	8	−2	50.00	
Coritiba	(Brazil)	10 December 1990	31 December 1990	3	0	0	3	1	6	−5	0.00	
Criciúma	(Brazil)	1 January 1991	31 July 1991	24	11	7	6	32	20	+12	45.83	
Al-Ahli	(Saudi Arabia)	1 August 1991	31 December 1991	11	7	2	2	15	8	+7	63.64	
Al-Qadsia	(Kuwait)	1992	1992	15	8	5	2	24	9	+15	53.33	
Grêmio	(Brazil)	1 January 1993	31 December 1996	222	99	56	67	432	272	+160	44.59	
Júbilo Iwata	(Japan)	1 February 1997	29 May 1997	16	10	2	4	28	18	+10	62.50	
Palmeiras	(Brazil)	1 January 1998	30 June 2000	254	127	64	63	356	244	+112	50.00	
Cruzeiro	(Brazil)	1 July 2000	10 June 2001	75	40	23	12	108	62	+46	53.33	
Brazil	(Brazil)	11 June 2001	9 August 2002	26	19	1	6	56	16	+40	73.08	
Portugal	(Portugal)	28 November 2003	30 June 2008	74	42	18	14	129	53	+76	56.76	
Chelsea	(England)	1 July 2008	9 February 2009	36	20	11	5	66	24	+42	55.56	
Bunyodkor	(Uzbekistan)	8 June 2009	28 May 2010	44	33	5	6	101	33	+68	75.00	
Palmeiras	(Brazil)	13 June 2010	13 September 2012	154	65	47	42	230	174	+56	42.21	
Brazil	(Brazil)	28 November 2012	14 July 2014	29	19	6	4	69	26	+43	65.52	
Grêmio	(Brazil)	29 July 2014	19 May 2015	51	26	12	13	61	36	+25	50.98	
Guangzhou Evergrande	(China)	4 June 2015	9 November 2017	123	74	30	19	247	119	+128	60.16	
Palmeiras	(Brazil)	26 July 2018	3 September 2019	77	46	21	10	123	43	+80	59.74	
Cruzeiro	(Brazil)	19 October 2020	25 January 2021	21	9	8	4	24	16	+8	42.86	
Grêmio	(Brazil)	7 July 2021	10 October 2021	21	9	3	9	22	22	+0	42.86	
Athletico Paranaense	(Brazil)	4 May 2022	13 November 2022	47	22	14	11	68	51	+17	46.81	
Atlético Mineiro	(Brazil)	16 June 2023	20 March 2024	41	19	10	12	56	34	+22	46.34	
Career Total				1,647	817	450	380	2,494	1,506	+988	49.61	

Full statistics with Brazil: 58 wins, 7 draws, 10 losses; 125 goals scored, 52 goals conceded

== Honours ==
=== Player ===
Caxias do Sul

- Campeonato do Interior Gaúcho: 1973, 1975, 1977, 1978

Novo Hamburgo

- Campeonato do Interior Gaúcho: 1980

CSA

- Campeonato Alagoano: 1981

=== Manager ===
==== Club ====
CSA

- Campeonato Alagoano: 1982

Brasil de Pelotas

- Campeonato do Interior Gaúcho: 1983

Qadsia

- Kuwait Emir Cup: 1989

Criciúma

- Copa do Brasil: 1991
- Campeonato Catarinense: 1991

Grêmio

- Campeonato Gaúcho: 1987, 1995, 1996
- Campeonato Brasileiro Série A: 1996
- Copa do Brasil: 1994
- Copa Libertadores: 1995
- Recopa Sudamericana: 1996
- Intercontinental Cup runner-up: 1995

Júbilo Iwata

- J.League: 1997

Palmeiras

- Campeonato Brasileiro Série A: 2018
- Copa do Brasil: 1998, 2012
- Copa Mercosur: 1998
- Copa Libertadores: 1999
- Torneio Rio-São Paulo: 2000
- Intercontinental Cup runner-up: 1999

Cruzeiro

- Copa Sul-Minas: 2001

Bunyodkor

- Uzbek League: 2009

Guangzhou Evergrande

- Chinese Super League: 2015, 2016, 2017
- AFC Champions League: 2015
- Chinese FA Cup: 2016
- Chinese FA Super Cup: 2016, 2017

==== International ====
Kuwait

- Arabian Gulf Cup: 1990

Brazil

- FIFA World Cup: 2002
- FIFA Confederations Cup: 2013

Portugal

- UEFA European Championship runner-up: 2004

=== Individual ===
- Best Football Coach in Brazil: 2018
- Brasileirão Coach of the Year: 2018
- South American Coach of the Year: 1999, 2002
- IFFHS World's Best National Coach: 2002
- Chinese Super League Coach of the Year: 2015, 2016

=== Orders ===
- Commander of the Order of Prince Henry
- Medal of Merit, Order of the Immaculate Conception of Vila Viçosa (House of Braganza)

== See also ==
- List of football managers with the most matches
- List of Brazil national football team managers
